= 2017–18 DFB-Pokal =

Tournament details
- Country: Germany
- Venue(s): Olympiastadion, Berlin
- Dates: 11 August 2017 – 19 May 2018
- Teams: 64

Final positions
- Champions: Eintracht Frankfurt (5th title)
- Runner-up: Bayern Munich
- Europa League: Eintracht Frankfurt

Tournament statistics
- Matches played: 63
- Goals scored: 221 (3.51 per match)
- Attendance: 1,291,895 (20,506 per match)
- Top goal scorer(s): Robert Lewandowski (6 goals)
- Goals scored in penalty shoot-outs not included.

The 2017–18 DFB-Pokal was the 75th season of the annual German football cup competition. Sixty-four teams participated in the competition, including all teams from the previous year's Bundesliga and the 2. Bundesliga. The competition began on 11 August 2017 with the first of six rounds and ended on 19 May 2018 with the final at the Olympiastadion in Berlin, a nominally neutral venue, which has hosted the final since 1985. The DFB-Pokal is considered the second-most important club title in German football after the Bundesliga championship. The DFB-Pokal is run by the German Football Association (DFB).

The defending champions were Bundesliga side Borussia Dortmund, after they defeated Eintracht Frankfurt 2–1 in the previous final. Dortmund were knocked out of the competition in the round of 16 by record winners Bayern Munich, losing 1–2.

Eintracht Frankfurt defeated Bayern Munich 3–1 in the final to claim their fifth title.

As winners, Eintracht Frankfurt automatically qualified for the group stage of the 2018–19 edition of the UEFA Europa League. They also hosted the 2018 edition of the DFL-Supercup at the start of the 2018-19 season, when they faced the champion of the 2017–18 Bundesliga, Bayern Munich.

== Participating clubs ==
The following 64 teams qualified for the competition:

Bundesliga the 18 clubs of the 2016–17 season	2. Bundesliga; the 18 clubs of the 2016–17 season	3. Liga; the top 4 clubs of the 2016–17 season
FC Augsburg; Hertha BSC; Werder Bremen; Darmstadt 98; Borussia Dortmund; Eintracht Frankfurt; SC Freiburg; Hamburger SV; 1899 Hoffenheim; FC Ingolstadt; 1. FC Köln; RB Leipzig; Bayer Leverkusen; Mainz 05; Borussia Mönchengladbach; Bayern Munich; Schalke 04; VfL Wolfsburg	Erzgebirge Aue; Union Berlin; Arminia Bielefeld; VfL Bochum; Eintracht Braunschweig; Dynamo Dresden; Fortuna Düsseldorf; Greuther Fürth; Hannover 96; 1. FC Heidenheim; 1. FC Kaiserslautern; Karlsruher SC; 1860 Munich; 1. FC Nürnberg; SV Sandhausen; FC St. Pauli; VfB Stuttgart; Würzburger Kickers	MSV Duisburg; Holstein Kiel; 1. FC Magdeburg; Jahn Regensburg
Representatives of the regional associations 24 representatives of 21 regional associations of the DFB, qualify (in general) through the 2016–17 Verbandspokal (Note: The three regions with the most participating teams in their league competitions (Bavaria, Lower Saxony, and Westphalia) are allowed to enter two teams for the competition.)
Baden; FC Nöttingen: Bavaria (Note: In addition to the Bavarian Cup winners, the best-placed amateur team of the Regionalliga Bayern also qualify.); Schweinfurt 05 (CW) SpVgg Unterhaching (RB): Berlin; BFC Dynamo: Brandenburg; Energie Cottbus: Bremen; Leher TS: Hamburg; Eintracht Norderstedt: Hesse; Wehen Wiesbaden	Lower Rhine; Rot-Weiss Essen (Note: Rot-Weiss Essen qualified regardless of the outcome of the final of the Lower Rhine Cup, as MSV Duisburg, the other finalists, already qualified for the DFB-Pokal through their 3. Liga position.): Lower Saxony (Note: Both finalists of the Lower Saxony Cup qualify.); LSK Hansa VfL Osnabrück: Mecklenburg-Vorpommern; Hansa Rostock: Middle Rhine; Bonner SC: Rhineland; TuS Koblenz: Saarland; 1. FC Saarbrücken; Saxony; Chemnitzer FC	Saxony-Anhalt; Germania Halberstadt (Note: Germania Halberstadt qualified regardless of the outcome of the final of the Saxony-Anhalt Cup, as 1. FC Magdeburg, the other finalists, already qualified for the DFB-Pokal through their 3. Liga position.): Schleswig-Holstein; SV Eichede (Note: SV Eichede qualified regardless of the outcome of the final of the Schleswig-Holstein Cup, as Holstein Kiel, the other finalists, already qualified for the DFB-Pokal through their 3. Liga position.): South Baden; 1. FC Rielasingen-Arlen; Southwest; SV Morlautern: Thuringia; Rot-Weiß Erfurt: Westphalia (Note: In addition to the Westphalian Cup winners, the winners of a play-off between the best-placed amateur Westphalian team of the Regionalliga West and the best-placed amateur team of the Oberliga Westfalen also qualify.); SC Paderborn (CW) TuS Erndtebrück (PO): Württemberg; Sportfreunde Dorfmerkingen

== Format ==
=== Participation ===
The DFB-Pokal began with a round of 64 teams. The 36 teams of the Bundesliga and 2. Bundesliga, along with the top 4 finishers of the 3. Liga automatically qualified for the tournament. Of the remaining slots, 21 were given to the cup winners of the regional football associations, the Verbandspokal. The 3 remaining slots were given to the three regional associations with the most men's teams, which at the time were Bavaria, Lower Saxony, and Westphalia. The runner-up of the Lower Saxony Cup was given the slot, along with the best-placed amateur team of the Regionalliga Bayern. For Westphalia, the winner of a play-off between the best-placed team of the Regionalliga West and Oberliga Westfalen also qualified. As every team was entitled to participate in local tournaments which qualified for the association cups, every team could in principle compete in the DFB-Pokal. Reserve teams and combined football sections were not permitted to enter, along with no two teams of the same association or corporation.

=== Draw ===
The draws for the different rounds were conducted as following:

For the first round, the participating teams were split into two pots of 32 teams each. The first pot contained all teams which had qualified through their regional cup competitions, the best four teams of the 3. Liga, and the bottom four teams of the 2. Bundesliga. Every team from this pot was drawn to a team from the second pot, which contained all remaining professional teams (all the teams of the Bundesliga and the remaining fourteen 2. Bundesliga teams). The teams from the first pot were set as the home team in the process.

The two-pot scenario was also applied for the second round, with the remaining 3. Liga and/or amateur team(s) in the first pot and the remaining Bundesliga and 2. Bundesliga teams in the other pot. Once again, the 3. Liga and/or amateur team(s) served as hosts. This time the pots did not have to be of equal size though, depending on the results of the first round. Theoretically, it was even possible that there could be only one pot, if all of the teams from one of the pots from the first round beat all the others in the second pot. Once one pot was empty, the remaining pairings were drawn from the other pot with the first-drawn team for a match serving as hosts.

For the remaining rounds, the draw was conducted from just one pot. Any remaining 3. Liga and/or amateur team(s) were the home team if drawn against a professional team. In every other case, the first-drawn team served as hosts.

=== Match rules ===
Teams met in one game per round. Matches took place for 90 minutes, with two halves of 45 minutes. If still tied after regulation, 30 minutes of extra time were played, consisting of two periods of 15 minutes. If the score was still level after this, the match was decided by a penalty shoot-out. A coin toss decided who took the first penalty. A total of seven players were allowed to be listed on the substitute bench, with up to three substitutions being allowed during regulation. After approval by the IFAB during the previous season, the use of a fourth substitute was allowed in extra time as part of a pilot project. From the quarter-finals onward, a video assistant referee was appointed for all DFB-Pokal matches. Though technically possible, VAR was not used for home matches of Bundesliga clubs prior to the quarter-finals in order to provide a uniform approach to all matches.

=== Suspensions ===
If a player received five yellow cards in the competition, he was then suspended from the next cup match. Similarly, receiving a second yellow card suspended a player from the next cup match. If a player received a direct red card, they were suspended a minimum of one match, but the German Football Association reserved the right to increase the suspension.

=== Champion qualification ===
The winner of the DFB-Pokal, Eintracht Frankfurt, earned automatic qualification for the group stage of next year's edition of the UEFA Europa League. As winner, they also hosted the 2018 DFL-Supercup at the start of the next season, and faced the champion of the previous year's Bundesliga, Bayern Munich.

== Schedule ==
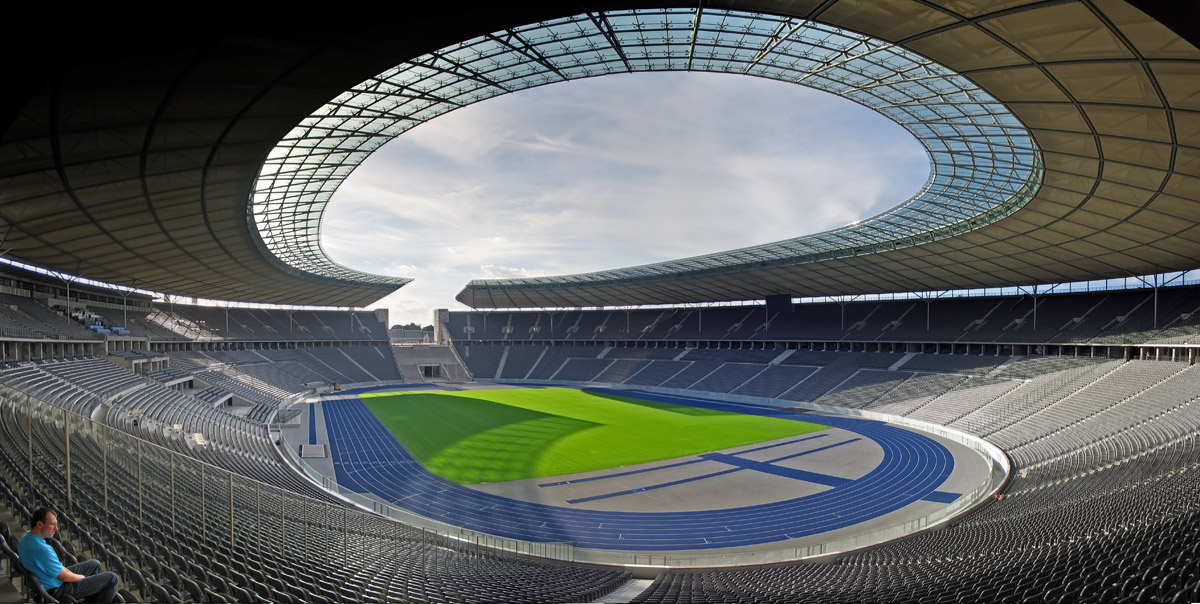
The Olympiastadion in Berlin hosted the final.

All draws were generally held at the German Football Museum in Dortmund, on a Sunday evening at 18:00 after each round. The draws were televised on ARD's Sportschau, broadcast on Das Erste. From the quarter-finals onwards, the draw for the DFB-Pokal der Frauen also took place at the same time.

The rounds of the 2017–18 competition were scheduled as follows:

Round	Draw date	Matches
First round	11 June 2017	11–14 August 2017
Second round	20 August 2017	24–25 October 2017
Round of 16	29 October 2017	19–20 December 2017
Quarter-finals	7 January 2018	6–7 February 2018
Semi-finals	11 February 2018	17–18 April 2018
Final	11 February 2018	19 May 2018 at Olympiastadion, Berlin

== Matches ==
A total of sixty-three matches took place, starting with the first round on 11 August 2017 and culminating with the final on 19 May 2018 at the Olympiastadion in Berlin.

Times up to 28 October 2017 and from 25 March 2018 are CEST (UTC+2). Times from 29 October 2017 to 24 March 2018 are CET (UTC+1).

=== First round ===
The draw for the first round was held on 11 June 2017 at 18:00, with Sebastian Kehl drawing the matches. The thirty-two matches took place from 11 to 14 August 2017.

11 August 2017 (Note: The TuS Koblenz v Dynamo Dresden match, originally scheduled on 12 August 2017, 15:30 CEST, was later rescheduled to 11 August 2017, 19:00 CEST, due to difficulty in finding a suitable stadium to host the match.)	TuS Koblenz	2–3	Dynamo Dresden	Zwickau (Note: The match took place at the Stadion Zwickau in Zwickau instead of TuS Koblenz's home stadium.)
19:00	Božić 6'; Popovits 80'	Report	Berko 11'; Heise 49'; Aosman 84'	Stadium: Stadion Zwickau; Attendance: 6,300; Referee: Markus Schmidt

11 August 2017	Rot-Weiss Essen	1–2	Borussia Mönchengladbach	Essen
20:45	Baier 29'	Report	Hofmann 79'; Raffael 82'	Stadium: Stadion Essen; Attendance: 18,500; Referee: Patrick Ittrich

11 August 2017	Karlsruher SC	0–3 (a.e.t.)	Bayer Leverkusen	Karlsruhe
20:45		Report	Kohr 93'; Pohjanpalo 99'; Bailey 105'	Stadium: Wildparkstadion; Attendance: 17,073; Referee: Robert Hartmann

11 August 2017	Holstein Kiel	2–1	Eintracht Braunschweig	Kiel
20:45	Drexler 71' (pen.); Ducksch 77'	Report	Nyman 48'	Stadium: Holstein-Stadion; Attendance: 10,052; Referee: Guido Winkmann

12 August 2017	Germania Halberstadt	1–2	SC Freiburg	Halberstadt
15:30	Michel 87'	Report	Petersen 34'; Lachheb 42' (o.g.)	Stadium: Friedensstadion; Attendance: 5,037; Referee: Christof Günsch

12 August 2017	Chemnitzer FC	0–5	Bayern Munich	Chemnitz
15:30		Report	Lewandowski 20', 60'; Coman 51'; Ribéry 79'; Hummels 89'	Stadium: Community4you Arena; Attendance: 15,015; Referee: Bibiana Steinhaus

12 August 2017	LSK Hansa	1–3	Mainz 05	Lüneburg (Note: The match took place at the Sportanlage Sülzwiesen in Lüneburg instead of LSK Hansa's home stadium.)
15:30	Vobejda 31'	Report	Mutō 13', 60'; Brosinski 45' (pen.)	Stadium: Sportanlage Sülzwiesen; Attendance: 4,000; Referee: Sven Jablonski

12 August 2017	Leher TS	0–5	1. FC Köln	Bremerhaven (Note: The match took place at the Nordsee-Stadion in Bremerhaven instead of Leher TS's home stadium.)
15:30		Report	Bittencourt 28'; Sørensen 34'; Córdoba 50' (pen.); Zoller 69'; Guirassy 74'	Stadium: Nordsee-Stadion; Attendance: 8,119; Referee: René Rohde

12 August 2017	SpVgg Unterhaching	0–4	1. FC Heidenheim	Unterhaching
15:30		Report	Beermann 44', 74'; Glatzel 80'; Pusch 86'	Stadium: Alpenbauer Sportpark; Attendance: 5,000; Referee: Timo Gerach

12 August 2017	TuS Erndtebrück	0–3	Eintracht Frankfurt	Siegen (Note: The match took place at the Leimbachstadion in Siegen instead of TuS Erndtebrück's home stadium.)
15:30		Report	Chandler 35'; Gaćinović 72'; Haller 76'	Stadium: Leimbachstadion; Attendance: 13,106; Referee: Benedikt Kempkes

12 August 2017	1. FC Rielasingen-Arlen	0–4	Borussia Dortmund	Freiburg (Note: The match took place at the Schwarzwald-Stadion in Freiburg instead of 1. FC Rielasingen-Arlen's home stadium.)
15:30		Report	Bartra 12'; Aubameyang 41' (pen.), 55', 80'	Stadium: Schwarzwald-Stadion; Attendance: 24,000; Referee: Christian Dietz

12 August 2017	SV Eichede	0–4	1. FC Kaiserslautern	Lübeck (Note: The match took place at the Stadion Lohmühle in Lübeck instead of SV Eichede's home stadium.)
15:30		Report	Osawe 17', 69'; Atik 40'; Moritz 85'	Stadium: Stadion Lohmühle; Attendance: 4,039; Referee: Sven Waschitzki

12 August 2017	Rot-Weiß Erfurt	0–1	1899 Hoffenheim	Erfurt
18:30		Report	Amiri 55'	Stadium: Steigerwaldstadion; Attendance: 8,144; Referee: Daniel Siebert

12 August 2017	Jahn Regensburg	3–1	Darmstadt 98	Regensburg
18:30	Lais 45+2' (pen.); Nietfeld 86'; Grüttner 90+4'	Report	Sobiech 40'	Stadium: Continental Arena; Attendance: 8,919; Referee: Martin Petersen

12 August 2017	Arminia Bielefeld	1–3 (a.e.t.)	Fortuna Düsseldorf	Bielefeld
18:30	Klos 55'	Report	Hennings 68', 96'; Fink 120+1'	Stadium: SchücoArena; Attendance: 19,825; Referee: Harm Osmers

12 August 2017	Würzburger Kickers	0–3	Werder Bremen	Offenbach (Note: The match took place at the Sparda-Bank-Hessen-Stadion in Offenbach instead of Würzburger Kickers's home stadium.)
20:45		Report	Veljković 50'; Kruse 74'; M. Eggestein 77'	Stadium: Sparda-Bank-Hessen-Stadion; Attendance: 8,090; Referee: Sascha Stegemann

13 August 2017	1860 Munich	1–2	FC Ingolstadt	Munich
15:30	Weber 66'	Report	Lezcano 20'; Kutschke 83' (pen.)	Stadium: Städtisches Stadion an der Grünwalder Straße; Attendance: 12,500; Referee: Tobias Stieler

13 August 2017	VfL Osnabrück	3–1	Hamburger SV	Osnabrück
15:30	Savran 39'; Heider 61'; Arslan 71'	Report	Wood 74' (pen.)	Stadium: Stadion an der Bremer Brücke; Attendance: 16,000; Referee: Deniz Aytekin

13 August 2017	Bonner SC	2–6	Hannover 96	Bonn
15:30	Lokotsch 20'; Perrey 83'	Report	Füllkrug 34', 74'; Harnik 60', 90+3'; Karaman 90'; Maier 90+1'	Stadium: Sportpark Nord; Attendance: 9,500; Referee: Daniel Schlager

13 August 2017	Sportfreunde Dorfmerkingen	0–5	RB Leipzig	Aalen (Note: The match took place at the Scholz-Arena in Aalen instead of Sportfreunde Dormerkingen's home stadium.)
15:30		Report	Sabitzer 4', 47'; Werner 56'; Poulsen 59' (pen.); Keïta 65'	Stadium: Ostalb Arena; Attendance: 10,460; Referee: Florian Badstübner

13 August 2017	Schweinfurt 05	2–1	SV Sandhausen	Schweinfurt
15:30	Willsch 53'; Krautschneider 62'	Report	Höler 11'	Stadium: Willy-Sachs-Stadion; Attendance: 4,610; Referee: Robert Kampka

13 August 2017	SV Morlautern	0–5	Greuther Fürth	Pirmasens (Note: The match took place at the Sportpark Husterhöhe in Pirmasens instead of SV Morlautern's home stadium.)
15:30		Report	Hofmann 16', 18'; Raum 58'; Dursun 85'; Ernst 86'	Stadium: Sportpark Husterhöhe; Attendance: 2,900; Referee: Robert Kempter

13 August 2017	1. FC Saarbrücken	1–2 (a.e.t.)	Union Berlin	Völklingen
15:30	Behrens 40'	Report	Schönheim 23'; Hedlund 101'	Stadium: Hermann-Neuberger-Stadion; Attendance: 6,936; Referee: Sören Storks

13 August 2017	FC Nöttingen	2–5	VfL Bochum	Karlsruhe (Note: The match took place at the Wildparkstadion in Karlsruhe instead of FC Nöttingen's home stadium.)
15:30	Brenner 51' (pen.); Bilger 85'	Report	Sağlam 1'; Hinterseer 3', 65', 74'; Bandowski 87'	Stadium: Wildparkstadion; Attendance: 2,700; Referee: Robert Schröder

13 August 2017	Eintracht Norderstedt	0–1	VfL Wolfsburg	Norderstedt
15:30		Report	Camacho 59'	Stadium: Edmund-Plambeck-Stadion; Attendance: 4,500; Referee: Lasse Koslowski

13 August 2017	1. FC Magdeburg	2–0	FC Augsburg	Magdeburg
18:30	Beck 87'; Schwede 90+1'	Report		Stadium: MDCC-Arena; Attendance: 21,641; Referee: Manuel Gräfe

13 August 2017	Energie Cottbus	2–2 (a.e.t.) (3–4 p)	VfB Stuttgart	Cottbus
18:30	Viteritti 5'; Zimmer 28'	Report	Brekalo 49'; Matuwila 77' (o.g.)	Stadium: Stadion der Freundschaft; Attendance: 17,516; Referee: Benjamin Cortus
	Penalties
	Viteritti (penalty scored); Stein (penalty scored); Schlüter (penalty scored); Ziegenbein (penalty missed); Förster (penalty missed)		(penalty scored) Terodde; (penalty scored) Ginczek; (penalty scored) Pavard; (penalty scored) Brekalo; (penalty missed) Özcan

13 August 2017	Wehen Wiesbaden	2–0	Erzgebirge Aue	Wiesbaden
18:30	Blacha 4'; Andrist 7'	Report		Stadium: Brita-Arena; Attendance: 2,500; Referee: Frank Willenborg

14 August 2017	MSV Duisburg	1–2	1. FC Nürnberg	Duisburg
18:30	Wolze 90+4' (pen.)	Report	Behrens 21'; Margreitter 41'	Stadium: Schauinsland-Reisen-Arena; Attendance: 15,576; Referee: Christian Dingert

14 August 2017	SC Paderborn	2–1	FC St. Pauli	Paderborn
18:30	Wassey 41'; Antwi-Adjei 79'	Report	Allagui 90+1'	Stadium: Benteler-Arena; Attendance: 15,000; Referee: Florian Heft

14 August 2017	BFC Dynamo	0–2	Schalke 04	Berlin
18:30		Report	Konoplyanka 78', 90+1'	Stadium: Friedrich-Ludwig-Jahn-Sportpark; Attendance: 14,117; Referee: Arne Aarnink

14 August 2017	Hansa Rostock	0–2	Hertha BSC	Rostock
20:45		Report	Weiser 86'; Ibišević 90+2'	Stadium: Ostseestadion; Attendance: 22,400; Referee: Robert Hartmann

=== Second round ===
The draw for the second round was held on 20 August 2017 at 18:00, with Carolin Kebekus drawing the matches. The sixteen matches took place from 24 to 25 October 2017.

24 October 2017	SC Paderborn	2–0	VfL Bochum	Paderborn
18:30	Michel 7'; Wassey 85'	Report		Stadium: Benteler-Arena; Attendance: 15,000; Referee: Sascha Stegemann

24 October 2017	Wehen Wiesbaden	1–3	Schalke 04	Wiesbaden
18:30	Blacha 76'	Report	Di Santo 26'; Burgstaller 30'; Mintzel 53' (o.g.)	Stadium: Brita-Arena; Attendance: 11,373; Referee: Sven Jablonski

24 October 2017	Fortuna Düsseldorf	0–1	Borussia Mönchengladbach	Düsseldorf
18:30		Report	Hazard 52'	Stadium: Esprit Arena; Attendance: 52,500; Referee: Manuel Gräfe

24 October 2017	Bayer Leverkusen	4–1	Union Berlin	Leverkusen
18:35 (Note: The Bayer Leverkusen v Union Berlin match, originally scheduled for 18:30 CEST, was delayed to 18:35 CEST due to a traffic jam around the stadium.)	Brandt 36'; Alario 58'; Wendell 89' (pen.); Aránguiz 90+2'	Report	Daube 46'	Stadium: BayArena; Attendance: 24,326; Referee: Frank Willenborg

24 October 2017	Schweinfurt 05	0–4	Eintracht Frankfurt	Schweinfurt
20:45		Report	Haller 14', 58'; Wolf 63'; Blum 85'	Stadium: Willy-Sachs-Stadion; Attendance: 15,060; Referee: Arne Aarnink

24 October 2017	1. FC Magdeburg	0–5	Borussia Dortmund	Magdeburg
20:45		Report	Castro 42'; Isak 47'; Yarmolenko 73' (pen.); Bartra 79'; Kagawa 90'	Stadium: MDCC-Arena; Attendance: 23,102; Referee: Daniel Siebert

24 October 2017	Mainz 05	3–2 (a.e.t.)	Holstein Kiel	Mainz
20:45	Fischer 22', 67'; Brosinski 101'	Report	Schindler 54' (pen.); Drexler 75' (pen.)	Stadium: Opel Arena; Attendance: 10,441; Referee: Daniel Schlager

24 October 2017	Greuther Fürth	1–3	FC Ingolstadt	Fürth
20:45	Raum 46'	Report	Cohen 48' (pen.); Lex 83'; Morales 87'	Stadium: Sportpark Ronhof Thomas Sommer; Attendance: 4,925; Referee: Harm Osmers

25 October 2017	VfL Osnabrück	2–3	1. FC Nürnberg	Osnabrück
18:30	Álvarez 4' (pen.); Groß 63'	Report	Ishak 38'; Leibold 50'; Valentini 72'	Stadium: Stadion an der Bremer Brücke; Attendance: 13,557; Referee: Bastian Dankert

25 October 2017	Hertha BSC	1–3	1. FC Köln	Berlin
18:30	Stark 69'	Report	Zoller 35'; Maroh 43'; Clemens 64'	Stadium: Olympiastadion; Attendance: 33,459; Referee: Marco Fritz

25 October 2017	VfL Wolfsburg	1–0	Hannover 96	Wolfsburg
18:30	Uduokhai 49'	Report		Stadium: Volkswagen Arena; Attendance: 15,508; Referee: Felix Brych

25 October 2017	1. FC Kaiserslautern	1–3	VfB Stuttgart	Kaiserslautern
18:30	Spalvis 6'	Report	Ginczek 21' (pen.); Akolo 66'; Terodde 71'	Stadium: Fritz-Walter-Stadion; Attendance: 28,322; Referee: Patrick Ittrich

25 October 2017	Jahn Regensburg	2–5	1. FC Heidenheim	Regensburg
20:45	Nietfeld 45+1'; Grüttner 54'	Report	Thiel 30', 50'; Glatzel 32', 82'; Pusch 55'	Stadium: Continental Arena; Attendance: 6,678; Referee: Christian Dingert

25 October 2017	Werder Bremen	1–0	1899 Hoffenheim	Bremen
20:45	Belfodil 30'	Report		Stadium: Weser-Stadion; Attendance: 31,210; Referee: Tobias Stieler

25 October 2017	SC Freiburg	3–1	Dynamo Dresden	Freiburg
20:45	Petersen 50'; Schuster 61'; Haberer 81'	Report	Benatelli 48'	Stadium: Schwarzwald-Stadion; Attendance: 17,800; Referee: Benjamin Brand

25 October 2017	RB Leipzig	1–1 (a.e.t.) (4–5 p)	Bayern Munich	Leipzig
20:45	Forsberg 68' (pen.)	Report	Thiago 73'	Stadium: Red Bull Arena; Attendance: 42,558; Referee: Felix Zwayer
	Penalties
	Bernardo (penalty scored); Kampl (penalty scored); Halstenberg (penalty scored); Orban (penalty scored); Werner (penalty missed)		(penalty scored) Lewandowski; (penalty scored) Alaba; (penalty scored) Hummels; (penalty scored) Rudy; (penalty scored) Robben

=== Round of 16 ===
The draw for the round of 16 was held on 29 October 2017 at 18:00, with Stefan Effenberg drawing the matches. The eight matches took place from 19 to 20 December 2017.

19 December 2017	Mainz 05	3–1	VfB Stuttgart	Mainz
18:30	Berggreen 62'; Diallo 71'; Serdar 90+3'	Report	Gentner 41'	Stadium: Opel Arena; Attendance: 22,143; Referee: Tobias Stieler

19 December 2017	SC Paderborn	1–0	FC Ingolstadt	Paderborn
18:30	Zolinski 56'	Report		Stadium: Benteler-Arena; Attendance: 14,800; Referee: Felix Zwayer

19 December 2017	1. FC Nürnberg	0–2 (a.e.t.)	VfL Wolfsburg	Nuremberg
20:45		Report	Uduokhai 96'; Didavi 118'	Stadium: Max-Morlock-Stadion; Attendance: 26,104; Referee: Daniel Siebert

19 December 2017	Schalke 04	1–0	1. FC Köln	Gelsenkirchen
20:45	Meyer 63'	Report		Stadium: Veltins-Arena; Attendance: 56,392; Referee: Robert Hartmann

20 December 2017	Werder Bremen	3–2	SC Freiburg	Bremen
18:30	Belfodil 3'; Kainz 20'; Bargfrede 69'	Report	Petersen 28' (pen.); Ravet 86'	Stadium: Weser-Stadion; Attendance: 33,519; Referee: Guido Winkmann

20 December 2017	Borussia Mönchengladbach	0–1	Bayer Leverkusen	Mönchengladbach
18:40 (Note: The Borussia Mönchengladbach v Bayer Leverkusen match, originally scheduled for 18:30 CET, was delayed to 18:40 CET due to delays for fans entering the stadium.)		Report	Bailey 70'	Stadium: Borussia-Park; Attendance: 49,016; Referee: Manuel Gräfe

20 December 2017	Bayern Munich	2–1	Borussia Dortmund	Munich
20:45	Boateng 12'; Müller 40'	Report	Yarmolenko 77'	Stadium: Allianz Arena; Attendance: 75,000; Referee: Sascha Stegemann

20 December 2017	1. FC Heidenheim	1–2 (a.e.t.)	Eintracht Frankfurt	Heidenheim
20:50 (Note: The 1. FC Heidenheim v Eintracht Frankfurt match, originally scheduled for 20:45 CET, was delayed to 20:50 CET due to smoke from fireworks in the stadium.)	Schnatterer 96'	Report	Gaćinović 95'; Haller 109'	Stadium: Voith-Arena; Attendance: 11,000; Referee: Sven Jablonski

=== Quarter-finals ===
The draw for the quarter-finals was held on 7 January 2018 at 18:00, with Oliver Roggisch drawing the matches. The four matches took place from 6 to 7 February 2018.

6 February 2018	SC Paderborn	0–6	Bayern Munich	Paderborn
18:30		Report	Coman 19'; Lewandowski 25'; Kimmich 42'; Tolisso 55'; Robben 86', 88'	Stadium: Benteler-Arena; Attendance: 15,000; Referee: Markus Schmidt

6 February 2018	Bayer Leverkusen	4–2 (a.e.t.)	Werder Bremen	Leverkusen
20:45	Brandt 31', 55'; Bellarabi 111'; Havertz 118'	Report	Kruse 4' (pen.); Jóhannsson 7'	Stadium: BayArena; Attendance: 25,653; Referee: Marco Fritz

7 February 2018	Eintracht Frankfurt	3–0	Mainz 05	Frankfurt
18:30	Rebić 17'; Hack 53' (o.g.); Mascarell 62'	Report		Stadium: Commerzbank-Arena; Attendance: 48,200; Referee: Deniz Aytekin

7 February 2018	Schalke 04	1–0	VfL Wolfsburg	Gelsenkirchen
20:45	Burgstaller 10'	Report		Stadium: Veltins-Arena; Attendance: 50,642; Referee: Christian Dingert

=== Semi-finals ===
The draw for the semi-finals was held on 11 February 2018 at 18:00, with Andreas Köpke drawing the matches. The two matches took place from 17 to 18 April 2018.

17 April 2018
20:45

Bayer Leverkusen	2–6	Bayern Munich
L. Bender 16'; Bailey 72'	Report	Lewandowski 3', 9'; Müller 52', 64', 78'; Thiago 60'

BayArena, Leverkusen
Attendance: 30,210
Referee: Daniel Siebert

18 April 2018
20:45

Schalke 04	0–1	Eintracht Frankfurt
	Report	Jović 75'

Veltins-Arena, Gelsenkirchen
Attendance: 60,000
Referee: Robert Hartmann

=== Final ===
The final took place on 19 May 2018 at the Olympiastadion in Berlin.

19 May 2018
20:00 CEST

Bayern Munich	1–3	Eintracht Frankfurt
Lewandowski 53'	Report	Rebić 11', 82'; Gaćinović 90+6'

Olympiastadion, Berlin
Attendance: 74,322
Referee: Felix Zwayer (Berlin)

== Bracket ==
The following is the bracket which the DFB-Pokal resembled. Numbers in parentheses next to the match score represent the results of a penalty shoot-out.

First round 11–14 August 2017
Arminia Bielefeld	1
Fortuna Düsseldorf (a.e.t.)	3
Rot-Weiss Essen	1
Borussia Mönchengladbach	2
Karlsruher SC	0
Bayer Leverkusen (a.e.t.)	3
1. FC Saarbrücken	1
Union Berlin (a.e.t.)	2
Würzburger Kickers	0
Werder Bremen	3
Rot-Weiß Erfurt	0
1899 Hoffenheim	1
Germania Halberstadt	1
SC Freiburg	2
TuS Koblenz	2
Dynamo Dresden	3
SC Paderborn	2
FC St. Pauli	1
FC Nöttingen	2
VfL Bochum	5
SV Morlautern	0
Greuther Fürth	5
1860 Munich	1
FC Ingolstadt	2
Sportfreunde Dorfmerkingen	0
RB Leipzig	5
Chemnitzer FC	0
Bayern Munich	5
1. FC Magdeburg	2
FC Augsburg	0
1. FC Rielasingen-Arlen	0
Borussia Dortmund	4
Wehen Wiesbaden	2
Erzgebirge Aue	0
BFC Dynamo	0
Schalke 04	2
Hansa Rostock	0
Hertha BSC	2
Leher TS	0
1. FC Köln	5
VfL Osnabrück	3
Hamburger SV	1
MSV Duisburg	1
1. FC Nürnberg	2
Eintracht Norderstedt	0
VfL Wolfsburg	1
Bonner SC	2
Hannover 96	6
Jahn Regensburg	3
Darmstadt 98	1
SpVgg Unterhaching	0
1. FC Heidenheim	4
Schweinfurt 05	2
SV Sandhausen	1
TuS Erndtebrück	0
Eintracht Frankfurt	3
LSK Hansa	1
Mainz 05	3
Holstein Kiel	2
Eintracht Braunschweig	1
SV Eichede	0
1. FC Kaiserslautern	4
Energie Cottbus	2 (3)
VfB Stuttgart (p)	2 (4)

Second round 24–25 October 2017
Fortuna Düsseldorf	0
Borussia Mönchengladbach	1
Bayer Leverkusen	4
Union Berlin	1
Werder Bremen	1
1899 Hoffenheim	0
SC Freiburg	3
Dynamo Dresden	1
SC Paderborn	2
VfL Bochum	0
Greuther Fürth	1
FC Ingolstadt	3
RB Leipzig	1 (4)
Bayern Munich (p)	1 (5)
1. FC Magdeburg	0
Borussia Dortmund	5
Wehen Wiesbaden	1
Schalke 04	3
Hertha BSC	1
1. FC Köln	3
VfL Osnabrück	2
1. FC Nürnberg	3
VfL Wolfsburg	1
Hannover 96	0
Jahn Regensburg	2
1. FC Heidenheim	5
Schweinfurt 05	0
Eintracht Frankfurt	4
Mainz 05 (a.e.t.)	3
Holstein Kiel	2
1. FC Kaiserslautern	1
VfB Stuttgart	3

Round of 16; 19–20 December 2017
Borussia Mönchengladbach	0
Bayer Leverkusen	1
Werder Bremen	3
SC Freiburg	2
SC Paderborn	1
FC Ingolstadt	0
Bayern Munich	2
Borussia Dortmund	1
Schalke 04	1
1. FC Köln	0
1. FC Nürnberg	0
VfL Wolfsburg (a.e.t.)	2
1. FC Heidenheim	1
Eintracht Frankfurt (a.e.t.)	2
Mainz 05	3
VfB Stuttgart	1

Quarter-finals; 6–7 February 2018
Bayer Leverkusen (a.e.t.)	4
Werder Bremen	2
SC Paderborn	0
Bayern Munich	6
Schalke 04	1
VfL Wolfsburg	0
Eintracht Frankfurt	3
Mainz 05	0

Semi-finals; 17–18 April 2018
Bayer Leverkusen	2
Bayern Munich	6
Schalke 04	0
Eintracht Frankfurt	1

Final; 19 May 2018
Bayern Munich	1
Eintracht Frankfurt	3

== Top goalscorers ==
The following are the top scorers of the DFB-Pokal, sorted first by number of goals, and then alphabetically if necessary. Goals scored in penalty shoot-outs are not included.

Rank	Player	Team	Goals
1	(Poland) Robert Lewandowski	Bayern Munich	6
2	(France) Sébastien Haller	Eintracht Frankfurt	4
2	(Germany) Thomas Müller	Bayern Munich	4
4	(Gabon) Pierre-Emerick Aubameyang	Borussia Dortmund	3
4	(Jamaica) Leon Bailey	Bayer Leverkusen	3
4	(Germany) Julian Brandt	Bayer Leverkusen	3
4	(Serbia) Mijat Gaćinović	Eintracht Frankfurt	3
4	(Germany) Robert Glatzel	1. FC Heidenheim	3
4	(Austria) Lukas Hinterseer	VfL Bochum	3
4	(Germany) Nils Petersen	SC Freiburg	3
4	(Croatia) Ante Rebić	Eintracht Frankfurt	3
