= 2017–18 VfB Stuttgart season =

VfB Stuttgart
2017–18 season
- President: Wolfgang Dietrich
- Sporting director: Michael Reschke
- Manager: Hannes Wolf (until 28 January); Tayfun Korkut (from 29 January)
- Stadium: Mercedes-Benz Arena
- Bundesliga: 7th
- DFB-Pokal: Round of 16
- Top goalscorer: League: Mario Gómez (8 goals); All: Daniel Ginczek; Mario Gómez (8 goals each)
- Highest home attendance: 60,449
- Lowest home attendance: 50,500
- Average home league attendance: 56,366
- Biggest win: Stuttgart 3–0 Freiburg; Bayern 1–4 Stuttgart
- Biggest defeat: Dortmund 3–0 Stuttgart
Home colours	Away colours	Third colours
- All statistics correct as of 21 May 2018.

The 2017–18 VfB Stuttgart season is the 125th season in the football club's history and 52nd overall season in the top flight of German football, the Bundesliga, having been promoted from the 2. Bundesliga in 2017. In addition to the domestic league, VfB Stuttgart also are participating in this season's edition of the domestic cup, the DFB-Pokal. This is the 85th season for Stuttgart in the Mercedes-Benz Arena, located in Stuttgart, Baden-Württemberg, Germany. The season covers a period from 1 July 2017 to 30 June 2018.

== Players ==
=== Squad information ===
As of 25 January 2018

Note: Flags indicate national team as defined under FIFA eligibility rules; some limited exceptions apply. Players may hold more than one non-FIFA nationality.

No.	Pos.	Nation	Player
2	DF	ARG	Emiliano Insúa
3	DF	GER	Dennis Aogo
5	DF	GER	Timo Baumgartl
6	MF	ARG	Santiago Ascacíbar
11	FW	JPN	Takuma Asano (on loan from Arsenal)
13	GK	GER	Jens Grahl
14	FW	GRE	Anastasios Donis
15	MF	POR	Carlos Mané (on loan from Sporting CP)
16	GK	GER	Ron-Robert Zieler
17	MF	GER	Erik Thommy
19	MF	COD	Chadrac Akolo
20	MF	GER	Christian Gentner (captain)

No.	Pos.	Nation	Player
21	DF	FRA	Benjamin Pavard
23	MF	BEL	Orel Mangala
24	MF	GER	Dženis Burnić (on loan from Borussia Dortmund II)
25	DF	GER	Matthias Zimmermann
26	GK	GER	Alexander Meyer
27	FW	GER	Mario Gómez
28	DF	GER	Holger Badstuber
31	MF	TUR	Berkay Özcan
32	DF	GER	Andreas Beck
33	FW	GER	Daniel Ginczek
34	FW	DEN	Jacob Bruun Larsen (on loan from Borussia Dortmund)
35	DF	POL	Marcin Kamiński

=== Transfers ===
==== In ====
No.	Pos	Player	From	Type	Window	Ends	Fee	Source
3	DF	(Germany) Dennis Aogo	Schalke 04	Transfer	Summer	2019	Free	
6	MF	(Argentina) Santiago Ascacibar	(Argentina) Estudiantes La Plata	Transfer	Summer	2022	€8,000,000	
14	FW	(Greece) Anastasios Donis	(Italy) Juventus	Transfer	Summer	2021	€4,200,000	
16	GK	(Germany) Ron-Robert Zieler	(England) Leicester City	Transfer	Summer	2020	€4,000,000	
19	FW	(Democratic Republic of the Congo) Chadrac Akolo	(Switzerland) Sion	Transfer	Summer	2021	€6,000,000	
23	MF	(Belgium) Orel Mangala	(Belgium) Anderlecht	Transfer	Summer	2021	€1,800,000	
24	MF	(Germany) Dženis Burnić	Borussia Dortmund	Loan	Summer	2018	Free	
26	GK	(Germany) Alexander Meyer	Energie Cottbus	Transfer	Summer	2019	€400,000	
28	DF	(Germany) Holger Badstuber	Bayern Munich	Transfer	Summer	2018	Free	
29	DF	(Brazil) Ailton	(Brazil) Fluminense	Transfer	Summer	2021	€1,000,000	
32	DF	(Germany) Andreas Beck	(Turkey) Beşiktaş	Transfer	Summer	2019	€2,000,000	
—	DF	(Bosnia and Herzegovina) Toni Šunjić	(Italy) Palermo	Loan Return	Summer	2018	Free	
—	FW	(Ukraine) Borys Tashchy	(Czech Republic) Zbrojovka Brno	Loan Return	Summer	2017	Free	

==== Out ====
No.	Pos	Player	To	Type	Window	Fee	Source
1	GK	(Australia) Mitchell Langerak	(Spain) Levante	Transfer	Summer	€800,000	
4	DF	(France) Jérôme Onguéné	(Austria) RB Salzburg	Loan	Summer	Free	
6	DF	(Germany) Jean Zimmer	Fortuna Düsseldorf	Loan	Summer	Free	
10	MF	(Romania) Alexandru Maxim	Mainz 05	Transfer	Summer	€3,000,000	
16	DF	(Austria) Florian Klein	Austria Wien	Transfer	Summer	Free	
17	MF	(Germany) Tobias Werner	1. FC Nürnberg	Loan	Summer	Free	
32	GK	(Germany) Benjamin Uphoff	Karlsruher SC	Transfer	Summer	Free	
37	MF	(United States) Julian Green	Greuther Fürth	Loan	Summer	Free	
—	DF	(Bosnia and Herzegovina) Toni Šunjić	(Russia) Dynamo Moscow	Transfer	Summer	€700,000	
—	FW	(Ukraine) Borys Tashchy	MSV Duisburg	Transfer	Summer	Free	

== Competitions ==
Win Draw Loss

=== Overview ===
Competition	First match	Last match	Starting round	Final position	Record							
Competition	First match	Last match	Starting round	Final position	Pld	W	D	L	GF	GA	GD	Win %
Bundesliga	19 August 2017	12 May 2018	Matchday 1		34	15	6	13	36	36	+0	44.12
DFB-Pokal	13 August 2017	19 December 2017	First round	Round of 16	3	1	1	1	6	6	+0	33.33
Total					37	16	7	14	42	42	+0	43.24

Last updated: 21 May 2018
Source: Competitions

=== Bundesliga ===
==== League table ====
Pos	Team	Pld	W	D	L	GF	GA	GD	Pts	Qualification or relegation
5	Bayer Leverkusen	34	15	10	9	58	44	+14	55	Qualification for the Europa League group stage
6	RB Leipzig	34	15	8	11	57	53	+4	53	Qualification for the Europa League second qualifying round
7	VfB Stuttgart	34	15	6	13	36	36	0	51	
8	Eintracht Frankfurt	34	14	7	13	45	45	0	49	Qualification for the Europa League group stage (Note: Eintracht Frankfurt qualified for the Europa League group stage by winning the 2017–18 DFB-Pokal.)
9	Borussia Mönchengladbach	34	13	8	13	47	52	−5	47	

Source: DFB
Rules for classification: 1) Points; 2) Goal difference; 3) Goals scored; 4) Head-to-head results; 5) Head-to-head away goals scored; 6) Away goals scored; 7) Play-off.

==== Results summary ====
Overall								Home						Away					
Pld	W	D	L	GF	GA	GD	Pts	W	D	L	GF	GA	GD	W	D	L	GF	GA	GD
34	15	6	13	36	36	0	51	10	4	3	18	9	+9	5	2	10	18	27	−9

Last updated: 21 May 2018.
Source: Bundesliga

==== Results by round ====
Round	1	2	3	4	5	6	7	8	9	10	11	12	13	14	15	16	17	18	19	20	21	22	23	24	25	26	27	28	29	30	31	32	33	34
Ground	A	H	A	H	A	H	A	H	A	H	A	H	A	A	H	A	H	H	A	H	A	H	A	H	A	H	A	H	A	H	H	A	H	A
Result	L	W	L	W	L	D	L	W	L	W	L	W	D	L	L	L	L	W	L	L	D	W	W	W	W	D	W	D	L	D	W	W	W	W
Position	16	10	14	9	12	12	14	11	13	12	12	11	12	13	13	14	14	13	14	14	14	14	13	12	9	10	8	8	9	10	10	8	8	7

Updated to match(es) played on 21 May 2018. Source: Bundesliga
A = Away; H = Home; W = Win; D = Draw; L = Loss

==== Matches ====
19 August 2017 1	Hertha BSC	2–0	VfB Stuttgart	Berlin
15:30 CEST (UTC+2)	Leckie 46', 62'	Report		Stadium: Olympiastadion Berlin; Attendance: 44,751; Referee: Sascha Stegemann

26 August 2017 2	VfB Stuttgart	1–0	Mainz 05	Stuttgart
15:30 CEST (UTC+2)	Badstuber 53'	Report		Stadium: Mercedes-Benz Arena; Attendance: 53,100; Referee: Benjamin Brand

10 September 2017 3	Schalke 04	3–1	VfB Stuttgart	Gelsenkirchen
18:00 CEST (UTC+2)	Bentaleb 4' (pen.); Naldo 47'; Burgstaller 48'	Report	Akolo 40'	Stadium: Veltins-Arena; Attendance: 61,098; Referee: Frank Willenborg

16 September 2017 4	VfB Stuttgart	1–0	VfL Wolfsburg	Stuttgart
15:30 CEST (UTC+2)	Akolo 42'	Report		Stadium: Mercedes-Benz Arena; Attendance: 50,500; Referee: Guido Winkmann

19 September 2017 5	Borussia Mönchengladbach	2–0	VfB Stuttgart	Mönchengladbach
18:30 CEST (UTC+2)	Raffael 57', 74' (pen.)	Report		Stadium: Borussia-Park; Attendance: 44,063; Referee: Sören Storks

23 September 2017 6	VfB Stuttgart	0–0	FC Augsburg	Stuttgart
15:30 CEST (UTC+2)		Report		Stadium: Mercedes-Benz Arena; Attendance: 55,202; Referee: Harm Osmers

30 September 2017 7	Eintracht Frankfurt	2–1	VfB Stuttgart	Frankfurt
15:30 CEST (UTC+2)	Rebić 42'; Haller 90+3'	Report	Terodde 61'	Stadium: Commerzbank-Arena; Attendance: 51,500; Referee: Felix Brych

13 October 2017 8	VfB Stuttgart	2–1	1. FC Köln	Stuttgart
20:30 CEST (UTC+2)	Donis 38'; Akolo 90+4'	Report	Heintz 77'	Stadium: Mercedes-Benz Arena; Attendance: 58,716; Referee: Benjamin Cortus

21 October 2017 9	RB Leipzig	1–0	VfB Stuttgart	Leipzig
15:30 CEST (UTC+2)	Sabitzer 23'	Report		Stadium: Red Bull Arena; Attendance: 42,558; Referee: Sven Jablonski

29 October 2017 10	VfB Stuttgart	3–0	SC Freiburg	Stuttgart
18:00 CET (UTC+1)	Ginczek 38'; Pavard 45+4'; Terodde 82'	Report		Stadium: Mercedes-Benz Arena; Attendance: 58,872; Referee: Tobias Stieler

4 November 2017 11	Hamburger SV	3–1	VfB Stuttgart	Hamburg
15:30 CET (UTC+1)	Hunt 20'; Kostić 65'; Arp 69'	Report	Ginczek 55' (pen.)	Stadium: Volksparkstadion; Attendance: 54,976; Referee: Guido Winkmann

17 November 2017 12	VfB Stuttgart	2–1	Borussia Dortmund	Stuttgart
20:30 CET (UTC+1)	Akolo 5'; Brekalo 51'	Report	Philipp 45+3'	Stadium: Mercedes-Benz Arena; Attendance: 58,932; Referee: Frank Willenborg

24 November 2017 13	Hannover 96	1–1	VfB Stuttgart	Hanover
20:30 CET (UTC+1)	Füllkrug 76' (pen.)	Report	Asano 24'	Stadium: HDI-Arena; Attendance: 43,500; Referee: Christian Dingert

2 December 2017 14	Werder Bremen	1–0	VfB Stuttgart	Bremen
15:30 CET (UTC+1)	Kruse 45'	Report		Stadium: Weser-Stadion; Attendance: 41,500; Referee: Bastian Dankert

8 December 2017 15	VfB Stuttgart	0–2	Bayer Leverkusen	Stuttgart
20:30 CET (UTC+1)		Report	Havertz 20'; L. Bender 80'	Stadium: Mercedes-Benz Arena; Attendance: 54,650; Referee: Deniz Aytekin

13 December 2017 16	1899 Hoffenheim	1–0	VfB Stuttgart	Sinsheim
18:30 CET (UTC+1)	Uth 81'	Report		Stadium: Wirsol Rhein-Neckar-Arena; Attendance: 30,150; Referee: Bibiana Steinhaus

16 December 2017 17	VfB Stuttgart	0–1	Bayern Munich	Stuttgart
15:30 CET (UTC+1)		Report	Müller 79'	Stadium: Mercedes-Benz Arena; Attendance: 58,885; Referee: Patrick Ittrich

13 January 2018 18	VfB Stuttgart	1–0	Hertha BSC	Stuttgart
15:30 CET (UTC+1)	Stark 78' (o.g.)	Report		Stadium: Mercedes-Benz Arena; Attendance: 57,181; Referee: Felix Brych

20 January 2018 19	Mainz 05	3–2	VfB Stuttgart	Mainz
15:30 CET (UTC+1)	Mutō 45+2', 54'; Holtmann 64'	Report	Badstuber 19'; Ginczek 90+1'	Stadium: Opel Arena; Attendance: 25,736; Referee: Harm Osmers

27 January 2018 20	VfB Stuttgart	0–2	Schalke 04	Stuttgart
15:30 CET (UTC+1)		Report	Naldo 14'; Harit 19' (pen.)	Stadium: Mercedes-Benz Arena; Attendance: 55,096; Referee: Felix Zwayer

3 February 2018 21	VfL Wolfsburg	1–1	VfB Stuttgart	Wolfsburg
15:30 CET (UTC+1)	Origi 24'	Report	Gómez 60'	Stadium: Volkswagen Arena; Attendance: 24,378; Referee: Robert Hartmann

11 February 2018 22	VfB Stuttgart	1–0	Borussia Mönchengladbach	Stuttgart
15:30 CET (UTC+1)	Ginczek 5'	Report		Stadium: Mercedes-Benz Arena; Attendance: 53,296; Referee: Frank Willenborg

18 February 2018 23	FC Augsburg	0–1	VfB Stuttgart	Augsburg
15:30 CET (UTC+1)		Report	Gómez 27'	Stadium: WWK Arena; Attendance: 30,007; Referee: Tobias Stieler

24 February 2018 24	VfB Stuttgart	1–0	Eintracht Frankfurt	Stuttgart
15:30 CET (UTC+1)	Thommy 13'	Report		Stadium: Mercedes-Benz Arena; Attendance: 55,418; Referee: Bibiana Steinhaus

4 March 2018 25	1. FC Köln	2–3	VfB Stuttgart	Cologne
15:30 CET (UTC+1)	Pizarro 7'; Jojić 86'	Report	Gómez 45', 45+2'; Beck 57'	Stadium: RheinEnergieStadion; Attendance: 50,000; Referee: Sören Storks

11 March 2018 26	VfB Stuttgart	0–0	RB Leipzig	Stuttgart
15:30 CET (UTC+1)		Report		Stadium: Mercedes-Benz Arena; Attendance: 53,548; Referee: Tobias Stieler

16 March 2018 27	SC Freiburg	1–2	VfB Stuttgart	Freiburg
20:30 CET (UTC+1)	Petersen 53'	Report	Gómez 4', 75'	Stadium: Schwarzwald-Stadion; Attendance: 24,000; Referee: Benjamin Brand

31 March 2018 28	VfB Stuttgart	1–1	Hamburger SV	Stuttgart
15:30 CEST (UTC+2)	Ginczek 44'	Report	Holtby 18'	Stadium: Mercedes-Benz Arena; Attendance: 55,000; Referee: Felix Brych

8 April 2018 29	Borussia Dortmund	3–0	VfB Stuttgart	Dortmund
15:30 CEST (UTC+2)	Pulisic 38'; Batshuayi 48'; Philipp 59'	Report		Stadium: Signal Iduna Park; Attendance: 81,360; Referee: Patrick Ittrich

14 April 2018 30	VfB Stuttgart	1–1	Hannover 96	Stuttgart
15:30 CEST (UTC+2)	Thommy 53'	Report	Füllkrug 90+1'	Stadium: Mercedes-Benz Arena; Attendance: 57,131; Referee: Sven Jablonski

21 April 2018 31	VfB Stuttgart	2–0	Werder Bremen	Stuttgart
15:30 CEST (UTC+2)	Gentner 13'; Özcan 90+1'	Report		Stadium: Mercedes-Benz Arena; Attendance: 58,932; Referee: Sören Storks

28 April 2018 32	Bayer Leverkusen	0–1	VfB Stuttgart	Leverkusen
18:30 CEST (UTC+2)		Report	Gentner 67'	Stadium: BayArena; Attendance: 30,210; Referee: Tobias Welz

5 May 2018 33	VfB Stuttgart	2–0	1899 Hoffenheim	Stuttgart
15:30 CEST (UTC+2)	Gómez 25', 74'	Report		Stadium: Mercedes-Benz Arena; Attendance: 58,312; Referee: Felix Zwayer

12 May 2018 34	Bayern Munich	1–4	VfB Stuttgart	Munich
15:30 CEST (UTC+2)	Tolisso 21'	Report	Ginczek 5', 55'; Donis 42'; Akolo 52'	Stadium: Allianz Arena; Attendance: 75,000; Referee: Sascha Stegemann

=== DFB-Pokal ===
13 August 2017 First round	Energie Cottbus	2–2 (a.e.t.) (3–4 p)	VfB Stuttgart	Cottbus
18:30 CEST (UTC+2)	Viteritti 5'; Zimmer 28'	Report	Brekalo 49'; Matuwila 77' (o.g.)	Stadium: Stadion der Freundschaft; Attendance: 17,516; Referee: Benjamin Cortus
	Penalties
	Viteritti (penalty scored); Stein (penalty scored); Schlüter (penalty scored); Ziegenbein (penalty missed); Förster (penalty missed)		(penalty scored) Terodde; (penalty scored) Ginczek; (penalty scored) Pavard; (penalty scored) Brekalo; (penalty missed) Özcan

25 October 2017 Second round	1. FC Kaiserslautern	1–3	VfB Stuttgart	Kaiserslautern
18:30 CEST (UTC+2)	Spalvis 6'	Report	Ginczek 21' (pen.); Akolo 66'; Terodde 71'	Stadium: Fritz-Walter-Stadion; Attendance: 28,322; Referee: Patrick Ittrich

19 December 2017 Round of 16	Mainz 05	3–1	VfB Stuttgart	Mainz
18:30 CET (UTC+1)	Berggreen 62'; Diallo 71'; Serdar 90+3'	Report	Gentner 41'	Stadium: Opel Arena; Attendance: 22,143; Referee: Tobias Stieler
