= 2016–17 VfB Stuttgart season =

VfB Stuttgart
2016–17 season
- Chairman: Bernd Wahler
- Manager: Hannes Wolf
- Stadium: Mercedes-Benz Arena, Stuttgart
- 2. Bundesliga: Champions
- DFB-Pokal: Second round
- Top goalscorer: League: Simon Terodde (25); All: Simon Terodde (25)
Home colours	Away colours	Third colours
- All statistics correct as of 08 April 2017.

The 2016–17 VfB Stuttgart season is the 124th season and the first season since being relegated from the Bundesliga during the 2015–16 season. This is the first time in 41 years that Stuttgart were relegated.

== Background ==
Stuttgart were relegated after finishing in 17th place in the Bundesliga. They were sent down after a 3–1 loss to VfL Wolfsburg. This is their first relegation since 1975. Jürgen Kramny was demoted to head coach of the reserve team. He was replaced by Jos Luhukay. They also sacked Robin Dutt, who had been the sporting director.

== 2. Bundesliga ==
=== Review ===
Stuttgart began the 2016–17 league season with a 2–1 win against FC St. Pauli. Alexandru Maxim and Christian Gentner scored for Stuttgart and Aziz Bouhaddouz scored for St. Pauli. This was their first match in the second division in 39 years.

=== League table ===
Pos	Team	Pld	W	D	L	GF	GA	GD	Pts	Promotion, qualification or relegation
1	VfB Stuttgart (C, P)	34	21	6	7	63	37	+26	69	Promotion to Bundesliga
2	Hannover 96 (P)	34	19	10	5	51	32	+19	67	Promotion to Bundesliga
3	Eintracht Braunschweig	34	19	9	6	50	36	+14	66	Qualification for promotion play-offs
4	Union Berlin	34	18	6	10	51	39	+12	60	
5	Dynamo Dresden	34	13	11	10	53	46	+7	50	

Source: DFB
Rules for classification: 1) Points; 2) Goal difference; 3) Goals scored
(C) Champions; (P) Promoted

=== Results summary ===
Overall								Home						Away					
Pld	W	D	L	GF	GA	GD	Pts	W	D	L	GF	GA	GD	W	D	L	GF	GA	GD
34	21	6	7	63	37	+26	69	13	2	2	40	15	+25	8	4	5	23	22	+1

Last updated: 22 May 2017.
Source: 1

=== Results by matchday ===
Matchday	1	2	3	4	5	6	7	8	9	10	11	12	13	14	15	16	17	18	19	20	21	22	23	24	25	26	27	28	29	30	31	32	33	34
Ground	H	A	A	H	A	H	A	H	A	H	A	H	A	H	A	H	A	A	H	H	A	H	A	H	A	H	A	H	A	H	A	H	A	H
Result	W	L	W	L	W	W	D	W	L	W	W	W	D	W	W	L	L	W	W	W	W	W	D	D	L	D	D	W	W	W	W	W	L	W
Position	5	7	5	8	5	3	3	3	5	3	3	3	3	3	3	3	3	2	1	1	1	1	1	1	2	1	2	1	1	1	1	1	1	1

Updated to match(es) played on 22 May 2017. Source: bundesliga.de
A = Away; H = Home; W = Win; D = Draw; L = Loss

=== League fixtures and results ===
8 August 2016 1	VfB Stuttgart	2–1	FC St. Pauli	Stuttgart
20:15 CEST (UTC+02:00)	Hosogai (yellow card) 17'; Maxim 67'; Gentner 87'; Klein (yellow card) 90'	Report] (in German)	Bouhaddouz 28'; Kalla (yellow card) 30'; Nehrig (yellow card) 71'; Ziereis (yellow card) 78'; Buballa (yellow card) 90'	Stadium: Mercedes-Benz Arena; Attendance: 60,000; Referee: Benjamin Brand (Bamberg)

12 August 2016 2	Fortuna Düsseldorf	1–0	VfB Stuttgart	Düsseldorf
20:30 CEST (UTC+02:00)	Bodzek (yellow card) 5'; Bellinghausen (yellow card) 38'; Bebou 53' (pen.)	Report (in German)	Sama (yellow card) 5'; Maxim (yellow card) 49'; Werner (yellow card) 68'; Šunjić (yellow card) 88'	Stadium: Esprit Arena; Attendance: 37,137; Referee: Benjamin Cortus (Röthenbach)

26 August 2016 3	SV Sandhausen	1–2	VfB Stuttgart	Sandhausen
18:30 CEST (UTC+02:00)	Knipping (yellow card) 41'; Kosecki (yellow card) 64'; Wooten 77'	Report (in German)	Terodde 39'; Werner (yellow card) 47'; Klein (yellow card) 62'; Gentner 65'; Insúa (yellow card) 68'	Stadium: Hardtwaldstadion; Attendance: 13,083; Referee: Frank Willenborg (Osnabrück)

9 September 2016 4	VfB Stuttgart	1–2	1. FC Heidenheim	Stuttgart
18:30 CEST (UTC+02:00)	Šunjić 72'; Klein (yellow card) 89'	Report (in German)	Halloran (yellow card) 39'; Verhoek 69'; Skarke 76'	Stadium: Mercedes-Benz Arena; Attendance: 52,200; Referee: Bibiana Steinhaus (Bad Lauterberg)

17 September 2016 5	1. FC Kaiserslautern	0–1	VfB Stuttgart	Kaiserslautern
13:00 CEST (UTC+02:00)	Görtler (yellow card) 43'; Ziegler (yellow card) 54'; Zoua (yellow card) 73'	Report (in German)	Terodde 52'	Stadium: Fritz-Walter-Stadion; Attendance: 45,761; Referee: Guido Winkmann (Kerken)

20 September 2016 6	VfB Stuttgart	2–0	Eintracht Braunschweig	Stuttgart
17:30 CEST (UTC+02:00)	Šunjić 18'; Maxim (yellow card) 63'; Großkreutz 64', (yellow card) 85'	Report (in German)	Valsvik (yellow card) 27'; Hernández (yellow card) 42'; Decarli (yellow card) 50'	Stadium: Mercedes-Benz Arena; Attendance: 36,800; Referee: Christian Dingert (Thallichtenberg)

23 September 2016 7	VfL Bochum	1–1	VfB Stuttgart	Bochum
18:30 CEST (UTC+02:00)	Eisfeld (yellow card) 1'; Mlapa (yellow card) 22'; Wurtz 79'	Report (in German)	Maxim (yellow card) 49'; Hosogai (yellow card) 52'; Gentner 57'; Terodde (yellow card) 90'	Stadium: Ruhrstadion; Attendance: 22,014; Referee: Daniel Siebert (Berlin)

3 October 2016 8	VfB Stuttgart	4–0	SpVgg Greuther Fürth	Stuttgart
20:15 CEST (UTC+02:00)	Mané 2', 4'; Pavard 24'; Großkreutz (yellow card) 76'; Gentner 80'	Report (in German)	Dursun (yellow card) 37'; Rapp (yellow card) 74'	Stadium: Mercedes-Benz Arena; Attendance: 38,150; Referee: René Rohde (Rostock)

15 October 2016 9	Dynamo Dresden	5–0	VfB Stuttgart	Dresden
13:00 CEST (UTC+02:00)	Hartmann (yellow card) 4'; Kutschke (yellow card) 25' (goal) 38'; Lambertz 42'; Gogia 44', 74'; Testroet 76'	Report (in German)	Özcan (yellow card) 66'	Stadium: Stadion Dresden; Attendance: 29,906; Referee: Benjamin Cortus (Röthenbach)

21 October 2016 10	VfB Stuttgart	2–1	1860 Munich	Stuttgart
18:30 CEST (UTC+02:00)	Özcan 6'; Mané (yellow card) 15'; Terodde 18'; Gentner (yellow card) 21'; Zimmermann (yellow card) 34'; Großkreutz (yellow card) 43'; Šunjić (yellow card) 49'; Maxim (yellow card) 90'	Report (in German)	Ayçiçek 35'; Rodnei (yellow card) 43'; Wittek (yellow card) 56'; Neuhaus (yellow card) 60'; Mauersberger (yellow card) 64'	Stadium: Mercedes-Benz Arena; Attendance: 55,100; Referee: Arne Aarnink (Nordhorn)

31 October 2016 11	Karlsruher SC	1–3	VfB Stuttgart	Karlsruhe
13:30 CEST (UTC+01:00)	Kempe (yellow card) 10'; Jordi (yellow card) 48'; Stoppelkamp 51'; Prömel (yellow card) 68'; Torres (yellow card) 90'	Report (in German)	Asano 10'; Terodde 46'; Großkreutz (yellow card) 62'; Maxim 86'	Stadium: Wildparkstadion; Attendance: 27,930; Referee: Sascha Stegemann (Niederkassel)

6 November 2016 12	VfB Stuttgart	3–1	Arminia Bielefeld	Stuttgart
13:30 CET (UTC+01:00)	Terodde 10', 70', 90'; Großkreutz (yellow card) 44'	Report (in German)	Voglsammer 64'; Klos (yellow card) 85'	Stadium: Mercedes-Benz Arena; Attendance: 55,160; Referee: Patrick Ittrich (Hamburg)

20 November 2016 13	Union Berlin	1–1	VfB Stuttgart	Berlin
13:30 CET (UTC+01:00)	Daube (yellow card) 31'; Skrzybski 60'; Fürstner (yellow card) 87'	Report (in German)	Terodde 3'; Kamiński (yellow card) 38'	Stadium: Stadion An der Alten Försterei; Attendance: 22,012; Referee: Deniz Aytekin (Oberasbach)

28 November 2016 14	VfB Stuttgart	3–1	1. FC Nürnberg	Stuttgart
20:15 CET (UTC+01:00)	Terodde 3', 33'; Pavard (yellow card) 35'; Insúa (yellow card) 86'; Asano 90'	Report (in German)	Möhwald 80'; Hovland (yellow card) 84'	Stadium: Mercedes-Benz Arena; Attendance: 27,441; Referee: Jochen Drees (Münster-Sarmsheim)

4 December 2016 15	Erzgebirge Aue	0–4	VfB Stuttgart	Aue
13:30 CET (UTC+01:00)	Nazarov (yellow card) 18'; Adler (yellow card) 43'; Pepić (yellow card) 75'	Report (in German)	Baumgartl 13'; Gentner 24'; Zimmermann (yellow card) 40'; Mané (yellow card) 41', (goal) 67', 76'	Stadium: Sparkassen-Erzgebirgsstadion; Attendance: 10,000; Referee: Sven Jablonski (Bremen)

12 December 2016 16	VfB Stuttgart	1–2	Hannover 96	Stuttgart
20:15 CET (UTC+01:00)	Terodde 12'; Großkreutz (yellow card) 39'; Pavard (yellow card) 76'; Baumgartl (red card) 90'	Report (in German)	Harnik 26'; Sorg (yellow card) 41'; Klaus 87'	Stadium: Mercedes-Benz Arena; Attendance: 47,125; Referee: Felix Brych (Munich)

18 December 2016 17	Würzburger Kickers	3–0	VfB Stuttgart	Würzburg
13:30 CET (UTC+01:00)	Benatelli 27'; Schoppenhauer 40'; Daghfous 79'	Report (in German)	Šunjić (yellow card) 74'	Stadium: Flyeralarm Arena; Attendance: 12,475; Referee: Lasse Koslowski (Berlin)

29 January 2017 18	FC St. Pauli	0–1	VfB Stuttgart	St. Pauli
13:30 CET (UTC+01:00)	Nehrig (yellow card) 72'; Buballa (yellow card) 76'; Neudecker (yellow card) 90'	Report (in German)	Gentner (yellow card) 11'; Mané 84'	Stadium: Millerntor-Stadion; Attendance: 29,546; Referee: Robert Schröder (Hannover)

6 February 2017 19	VfB Stuttgart	2–0	Fortuna Düsseldorf	Stuttgart
20:15 CET (UTC+01:00)	Terodde 13'; Green 20'	Report (in German)	Bebou (yellow card) 22'; Bodzek (yellow card) 34'; Madlung (yellow card) 62'	Stadium: Mercedes-Benz Arena; Attendance: 38,200; Referee: Felix Zwayer (Berlin)

12 February 2017 20	VfB Stuttgart	2–1	SV Sandhausen	Stuttgart
13:30 CET (UTC+01:00)	Terodde 46' (pen.), 85', (yellow card) 90'; Großkreutz (yellow card) 73'	Report (in German)	Paqarada (yellow card) 45'; Sukuta-Pasu 61'; Klingmann (yellow card) 67'; Knipping (yellow card) 81'	Stadium: Mercedes-Benz Arena; Attendance: 42,000; Referee: René Rohde (Rostock)

17 February 2017 21	1. FC Heidenheim	1–2	VfB Stuttgart	Heidenheim
18:30 CET (UTC+01:00)	Schnatterer 42'; Wahl (yellow card) 67'; Wittek (yellow card) 74'; Philp (yellow card) 82'	Report (in German)	Gentner 19', (yellow card) 69'; Brekalo 71'	Stadium: Voith-Arena; Attendance: 15,000; Referee: Jochen Drees (Münster-Sarmsheim)

26 February 2017 22	VfB Stuttgart	2–0	1. FC Kaiserslautern	Stuttgart
13:30 CET (UTC+01:00)	Baumgartl (yellow card) 25'; Terodde 58'; Özcan 87'	Report (in German)	Halfar (yellow card) 40'; Gaus (yellow card) 56'	Stadium: Mercedes-Benz Arena; Attendance: 52,100; Referee: Sven Jablonski (Bremen)

6 March 2017 23	Eintracht Braunschweig	1–1	VfB Stuttgart	Braunschweig
20:15 CET (UTC+01:00)	Reichel 42' (pen.); Moll (yellow card) 64'	Report (in German)	Mané 3'; Kamiński (yellow card) 35' (yellow card) 41' (red card)	Stadium: Eintracht-Stadion; Attendance: 23,000; Referee: Benjamin Brand (Bamberg)

10 March 2017 24	VfB Stuttgart	1–1	VfL Bochum	Stuttgart
18:30 CET (UTC+01:00)	Ginczek 70'; Mané (yellow card) 84'	Report (in German)	Losilla 10'; Mlapal (yellow card) 18'; Stiepermann (yellow card) 22'; Dawidowicz (yellow card) 32'; Canouse (yellow card) 72'	Stadium: Mercedes-Benz Arena; Attendance: 45,300; Referee: Benedikt Kempkes (Thür)

18 March 2017 25	SpVgg Greuther Fürth	1–0	VfB Stuttgart	Fürth
13:00 CET (UTC+01:00)	Berisha 9'; Hofmann (yellow card) 21'; Dursun (yellow card) 86'	Report (in German)	Ginczek (yellow card) 26'; Anto Grgić (yellow card) 60'; Terodde (yellow card) 90', (goal) 90'	Stadium: Sportpark Ronhof Thomas Sommer; Attendance: 12,660; Referee: Alexander Sather (Grimma)

2 April 2017 26	VfB Stuttgart	3–3	Dynamo Dresden	Stuttgart
13:00 CEST (UTC+02:00)	Langerak (yellow card) 24'; Terodde (yellow card) 28' (goal) 29', 90' (pen.); Insúa 75'	Report (in German)	Kutschke 4', 22', 26' (pen.)	Stadium: Mercedes-Benz Arena; Attendance: 58,000; Referee: Günter Perl (Pullach)

5 April 2017 27	1860 Munich	1–1	VfB Stuttgart	Munich
17:30 CEST (UTC+02:00)	Lacazette 23'; Amilton (yellow card) 79'; Bülow (yellow card) 90'	Report (in German)	Ofori (yellow card) 45'; Kamiński 90'	Stadium: Allianz Arena; Attendance: 47,100; Referee: Patrick Alt (Heusweiler)

9 April 2017 28	VfB Stuttgart	2–0	Karlsruher SC	Stuttgart
13:30 CEST (UTC+02:00)	Asano 27', 61'	Report (in German)	Krebs (yellow card) 14'; Kempe (yellow card) 74'	Stadium: Mercedes-Benz Arena; Attendance: 58,000; Referee: Christian Dingert (Lebecksmühle)

17 April 2017 29	Arminia Bielefeld	2–3	VfB Stuttgart	Bielefeld
20:15 CEST (UTC+02:00)	Hemlein 15'; Yabo 73'	Report (in German)	Maxim 51'; Terodde 54', 89'; Baumgartl (yellow card) 58'; Pavard (yellow card) 61'	Stadium: Bielefelder Alm; Attendance: 22,034; Referee: Harm Osmers (Hannover)

24 April 2017 30	VfB Stuttgart	3–1	Union Berlin	Stuttgart
20:15 CEST (UTC+02:00)	Maxim 29'; Terodde 33'; Pavard (yellow card) 35'; Ginczek 68'	Report (in German)	Trimmel (yellow card) 29'; Fürstner (yellow card) 42'; Polter 57'	Stadium: Mercedes-Benz Arena; Attendance: 58,000; Referee: Patrick Ittrich (Hamburg)

29 April 2017 31	1. FC Nürnberg	2–3	VfB Stuttgart	Nürnberg
13:00 CEST (UTC+02:00)	Behrens 25'; Mühl (yellow card) 27'; Teuchert 33'; Bulthuis (yellow card) 90+3'	Report (in German)	Terodde 47' (pen.); Ginczek 50'; Zimmermann (yellow card) 65'; Klein 90+1'	Stadium: Stadion Nürnberg; Attendance: 44,089; Referee: Bastian Dankert (Rostock)

7 May 2017 32	VfB Stuttgart	3–0	Erzgebirge Aue	Stuttgart
13:30 CEST (UTC+02:00)	Terodde 14' (pen.), 69'; Zimmermann (yellow card) 66'; Maxim 75'	Report (in German)	Fandrich (yellow card) 54'	Stadium: Mercedes-Benz Arena; Attendance: 59,000; Referee: Timo Gerach (Landau)

14 May 2017 33	Hannover 96	1–0	VfB Stuttgart	Hannover
15:30 CEST (UTC+02:00)	Klaus 40'; Prib (yellow card) 53'; Sané (red card) 87'; Harnik (yellow card) 89'	Report (in German)		Stadium: HDI-Arena; Attendance: 49,000; Referee: Wolfgang Stark (Ergolding)

21 May 2017 34	VfB Stuttgart	4–1	Würzburger Kickers	Stuttgart
15:30 CEST (UTC+02:00)	Zimmermann 32'; Terodde 59', 80'; Ginczek 89'	Report (in German)	Schröck (yellow card) 66', (goal) 78'; Schoppenhauer (yellow card) 79'	Stadium: Mercedes-Benz Arena; Attendance: 60,000; Referee: Patrick Ittrich (Hamburg)

== DFB-Pokal ==
=== DFB-Pokal review ===
In the first round draw, Stuttgart were drawn against FC 08 Homburg.

=== DFB-Pokal fixtures and results ===
20 August 2016 1	FC 08 Homburg	0–3	VfB Stuttgart	Homburg
18:30 CEST (UTC+02:00)		Report (in German)	Zimmermann (yellow card) 24'; Gentner 53'; Özcan 58'; Tashchy 87'	Stadium: Waldstadion Homburg; Attendance: 10,800; Referee: Robert Hartmann (Wangen)

25 October 2016 2	Borussia Mönchengladbach	2–0	VfB Stuttgart	Mönchengladbach
15:30 CET (UTC+02:00)	Johnson 32'; Stindl (yellow card) 62', (goal) 84'	Report (in German)	Insúa (yellow card) 40'	Stadium: Borussia-Park; Attendance: 40,452; Referee: Günter Perl (Pullach)

== Player information ==
=== Transfers ===
==== In ====
Pos.	Name	Age	EU	Moving from	Type	Transfer Window	Contract ends	Transfer fee	Ref.
DF	Marcin Kamiński	24	Yes	Lech Poznań	Transfers	Summer	2019	Free	

==== Out ====
Pos.	Name	Age	EU	Moving to	Type	Transfer Window	Transfer fee	Ref.
MF	Timo Werner	20	Yes	RB Leipzig	Transfer	Summer	€10M	
MF	Martin Harnik	29	Yes	Hannover 96	End of contract	Summer	—	
MF	Daniel Schwaab	27	Yes	PSV	End of contract	Summer	—	
DF	Georg Niedermeier	30	Yes	SC Freiburg	End of contract	Summer	—	
MF	Serey Die	31	No	Basel	Transfer	Summer	Undisclosed	
