= 2018–19 VfB Stuttgart season =

VfB Stuttgart
2018–19 season
- President: Wolfgang Dietrich
- Sporting director: Michael Reschke
- Manager: Tayfun Korkut (until 7 October); Markus Weinzierl (from 9 October)
- Stadium: Mercedes-Benz Arena
- Bundesliga: 16th (relegated via play-off)
- DFB-Pokal: First round
- Top goalscorer: League: Mario Gómez (7 goals); All: Mario Gómez (7 goals)
- Highest home attendance: 59,000
- Lowest home attendance: 46,072
- Average home league attendance: 54,577
- Biggest win: Stuttgart 5–1 Hannover
- Biggest defeat: Augsburg 6–0 Stuttgart
Home colours	Away colours	Third colours
- All statistics correct as of 25 May 2019.

The 2018–19 VfB Stuttgart season was the 126th season in the football club's history and 2nd consecutive and 53rd overall season in the top flight of German football, the Bundesliga, having been promoted from the 2. Bundesliga in 2017. In addition to the domestic league, VfB Stuttgart also participated in this season's edition of the domestic cup, the DFB-Pokal. This was the 86th season for Stuttgart in the Mercedes-Benz Arena, located in Stuttgart, Baden-Württemberg, Germany. The season covers a period from 1 July 2018 to 30 June 2019.

== Players ==
=== Squad information ===
As of 25 January 2019

Note: Flags indicate national team as defined under FIFA eligibility rules; some limited exceptions apply. Players may hold more than one non-FIFA nationality.

No.	Pos.	Nation	Player
1	GK	GER	Ron-Robert Zieler
2	DF	ARG	Emiliano Insúa
3	DF	GER	Dennis Aogo
4	DF	GER	Marc-Oliver Kempf
5	DF	GER	Timo Baumgartl
6	MF	ARG	Santiago Ascacíbar
7	DF	ESP	Pablo Maffeo
8	MF	GER	Gonzalo Castro
9	MF	SUI	Steven Zuber (on loan from Hoffenheim)
10	MF	GER	Daniel Didavi
11	FW	GRE	Anastasios Donis
13	GK	GER	Jens Grahl
14	FW	GER	Alexander Esswein (on loan from Hertha Berlin)
17	MF	GER	Erik Thommy

No.	Pos.	Nation	Player
18	DF	TUR	Ozan Kabak
19	MF	COD	Chadrac Akolo
20	MF	GER	Christian Gentner (captain)
21	DF	FRA	Benjamin Pavard
22	FW	ARG	Nicolás González
23	DF	GER	Antonis Aidonis
24	DF	CRO	Borna Sosa
25	FW	GER	Leon Dajaku
26	GK	GER	Alexander Meyer
27	FW	GER	Mario Gómez (vice-captain)
28	DF	GER	Holger Badstuber
29	MF	POL	David Kopacz
32	DF	GER	Andreas Beck (3rd captain)

== Competitions ==
Win Draw Loss

=== Overview ===
Competition	First match	Last match	Starting round	Final position	Record							
Competition	First match	Last match	Starting round	Final position	Pld	W	D	L	GF	GA	GD	Win %
Bundesliga	26 August 2018	18 May 2019	Matchday 1		34	7	7	20	32	70	−38	20.59
Bundesliga relegation play-offs	23 May 2018	27 May 2018	First leg		0	0	0	0	0	0	+0	—
DFB-Pokal	18 August 2018	18 August 2018	First round	First round	1	0	0	1	0	2	−2	0.00
Total					35	7	7	21	32	72	−40	20.00

Last updated: 25 May 2019
Source: Competitions

=== Bundesliga ===
==== League table ====
Pos	Team	Pld	W	D	L	GF	GA	GD	Pts	Qualification or relegation
14	Schalke 04	34	8	9	17	37	55	−18	33	
15	FC Augsburg	34	8	8	18	51	71	−20	32	
16	VfB Stuttgart (R)	34	7	7	20	32	70	−38	28	Qualification for the relegation play-offs
17	Hannover 96 (R)	34	5	6	23	31	71	−40	21	Relegation to 2. Bundesliga
18	1. FC Nürnberg (R)	34	3	10	21	26	68	−42	19	Relegation to 2. Bundesliga

Source: DFB
Rules for classification: 1) Points; 2) Goal difference; 3) Goals scored; 4) Head-to-head results; 5) Head-to-head away goals scored; 6) Away goals scored; 7) Play-off
(R) Relegated

==== Results summary ====
Overall								Home						Away					
Pld	W	D	L	GF	GA	GD	Pts	W	D	L	GF	GA	GD	W	D	L	GF	GA	GD
34	7	7	20	32	70	−38	28	6	4	7	22	27	−5	1	3	13	10	43	−33

Last updated: 25 May 2019.
Source: Bundesliga

==== Results by round ====
Round	1	2	3	4	5	6	7	8	9	10	11	12	13	14	15	16	17	18	19	20	21	22	23	24	25	26	27	28	29	30	31	32	33	34
Ground	A	H	A	H	A	H	A	H	A	H	A	A	H	A	H	A	H	H	A	H	A	H	A	H	A	H	A	H	H	A	H	A	H	A
Result	L	L	D	D	L	W	L	L	L	L	W	L	W	L	W	L	L	L	L	D	L	L	D	W	L	D	L	D	L	L	W	L	W	D
Position	13	18	16	17	17	16	18	17	17	17	18	18	16	16	15	16	16	16	16	16	16	16	16	16	16	16	16	16	16	16	16	16	16	16

Updated to match(es) played on 25 May 2019. Source: DFB
A = Away; H = Home; W = Win; D = Draw; L = Loss

==== Matches ====
26 August 2018 1	Mainz 05	1–0	VfB Stuttgart	Mainz
15:30 CEST (UTC+2)	Ujah 76'	Report		Stadium: Opel Arena; Attendance: 28,705; Referee: Daniel Siebert

1 September 2018 2	VfB Stuttgart	0–3	Bayern Munich	Stuttgart
18:30 CEST (UTC+2)		Report	Goretzka 37'; Lewandowski 62'; Müller 76'	Stadium: Mercedes-Benz Arena; Attendance: 58,680; Referee: Harm Osmers

16 September 2018 3	SC Freiburg	3–3	VfB Stuttgart	Freiburg
18:00 CEST (UTC+2)	Gondorf 1', 51'; Waldschmidt 81'	Report	Insúa 44'; Gómez 48', 56'	Stadium: Schwarzwald-Stadion; Attendance: 24,000; Referee: Deniz Aytekin

21 September 2018 4	VfB Stuttgart	0–0	Fortuna Düsseldorf	Stuttgart
20:30 CEST (UTC+2)		Report		Stadium: Mercedes-Benz Arena; Attendance: 54,410; Referee: Robert Hartmann

26 September 2018 5	RB Leipzig	2–0	VfB Stuttgart	Leipzig
20:30 CEST (UTC+2)	Orbán 45+1'; Augustin 80'	Report		Stadium: Red Bull Arena; Attendance: 32,187; Referee: Robert Schröder

29 September 2018 6	VfB Stuttgart	2–1	Werder Bremen	Stuttgart
15:30 CEST (UTC+2)	Donis 19'; Castro 75'	Report	Zieler 68' (o.g.)	Stadium: Mercedes-Benz Arena; Attendance: 58,569; Referee: Tobias Welz

6 October 2018 7	Hannover 96	3–1	VfB Stuttgart	Hanover
15:30 CEST (UTC+2)	Wood 30', 45+1'; Bebou 90+1'	Report	Gómez 50'	Stadium: HDI-Arena; Attendance: 40,800; Referee: Sascha Stegemann

20 October 2018 8	VfB Stuttgart	0–4	Borussia Dortmund	Stuttgart
15:30 CEST (UTC+2)		Report	Sancho 3'; Reus 23'; Alcácer 25'; Philipp 85'	Stadium: Mercedes-Benz Arena; Attendance: 59,000; Referee: Manuel Gräfe

27 October 2018 9	1899 Hoffenheim	4–0	VfB Stuttgart	Sinsheim
18:30 CEST (UTC+2)	Brenet 48'; Joelinton 51'; Belfodil 57', 60'	Report		Stadium: Wirsol Rhein-Neckar-Arena; Attendance: 30,150; Referee: Frank Willenborg

2 November 2018 10	VfB Stuttgart	0–3	Eintracht Frankfurt	Stuttgart
20:30 CET (UTC+1)		Report	Haller 11'; Rebić 32'; Müller 89'	Stadium: Mercedes-Benz Arena; Attendance: 58,016; Referee: Sven Jablonski

10 November 2018 11	1. FC Nürnberg	0–2	VfB Stuttgart	Nuremberg
15:30 CET (UTC+1)		Report	Baumgartl 68'; Thommy 82'	Stadium: Max-Morlock-Stadion; Attendance: 50,000; Referee: Christian Dingert

23 November 2018 12	Bayer Leverkusen	2–0	VfB Stuttgart	Leverkusen
20:30 CET (UTC+1)	Volland 76', 83'	Report		Stadium: BayArena; Attendance: 24,632; Referee: Robert Schröder

1 December 2018 13	VfB Stuttgart	1–0	FC Augsburg	Stuttgart
15:30 CET (UTC+1)	Donis 39'	Report		Stadium: Mercedes-Benz Arena; Attendance: 52,739; Referee: Harm Osmers

9 December 2018 14	Borussia Mönchengladbach	3–0	VfB Stuttgart	Mönchengladbach
18:00 CET (UTC+1)	Raffael 69'; Neuhaus 77'; Pavard 84' (o.g.)	Report		Stadium: Borussia-Park; Attendance: 48,590; Referee: Deniz Aytekin

15 December 2018 15	VfB Stuttgart	2–1	Hertha BSC	Stuttgart
15:30 CET (UTC+1)	Gómez 64', 76'	Report	Mittelstädt 38'	Stadium: Mercedes-Benz Arena; Attendance: 47,680; Referee: Sascha Stegemann

18 December 2018 16	VfL Wolfsburg	2–0	VfB Stuttgart	Wolfsburg
20:30 CET (UTC+1)	Guilavogui 24'; Weghorst 44'	Report		Stadium: Volkswagen Arena; Attendance: 21,780; Referee: Robert Hartmann

22 December 2018 17	VfB Stuttgart	1–3	Schalke 04	Stuttgart
15:30 CET (UTC+1)	González 76'	Report	Skrzybski 10'; Sané 70'; Kutucu 78'	Stadium: Mercedes-Benz Arena; Attendance: 54,022; Referee: Felix Brych

19 January 2019 18	VfB Stuttgart	2–3	Mainz 05	Stuttgart
15:30 CET (UTC+1)	González 83'; Kempf 85'	Report	Ascacíbar 22' (o.g.); Mateta 28'; Hack 72'	Stadium: Mercedes-Benz Arena; Attendance: 51,881; Referee: Tobias Stieler

27 January 2019 19	Bayern Munich	4–1	VfB Stuttgart	Munich
15:30 CET (UTC+1)	Thiago 5'; Gentner 55' (o.g.); Goretzka 71'; Lewandowski 84'	Report	Donis 26'	Stadium: Allianz Arena; Attendance: 75,000; Referee: Frank Willenborg

3 February 2019 20	VfB Stuttgart	2–2	SC Freiburg	Stuttgart
18:00 CET (UTC+1)	Insúa 75'; Didavi 83'	Report	Haberer 4'; Niederlechner 90+4'	Stadium: Mercedes-Benz Arena; Attendance: 51,009; Referee: Deniz Aytekin

10 February 2019 21	Fortuna Düsseldorf	3–0	VfB Stuttgart	Düsseldorf
18:00 CET (UTC+1)	Karaman 34'; Fink 49'; Raman 85'	Report		Stadium: Merkur Spiel-Arena; Attendance: 40,211; Referee: Christian Dingert

16 February 2019 22	VfB Stuttgart	1–3	RB Leipzig	Stuttgart
15:30 CET (UTC+1)	Zuber 16' (pen.)	Report	Poulsen 6', 74'; Sabitzer 68'	Stadium: Mercedes-Benz Arena; Attendance: 46,072; Referee: Felix Zwayer

22 February 2019 23	Werder Bremen	1–1	VfB Stuttgart	Bremen
20:30 CET (UTC+1)	Klaassen 45'	Report	Zuber 1'	Stadium: Weser-Stadion; Attendance: 41,000; Referee: Robert Hartmann

3 March 2019 24	VfB Stuttgart	5–1	Hannover 96	Stuttgart
15:30 CET (UTC+1)	Gómez 4'; Kabak 16', 45'; Zuber 78', 81'	Report	Jonathas 68'	Stadium: Mercedes-Benz Arena; Attendance: 55,781; Referee: Bastian Dankert

9 March 2019 25	Borussia Dortmund	3–1	VfB Stuttgart	Dortmund
15:30 CET (UTC+1)	Reus 62' (pen.); Alcácer 84'; Pulisic 90+2'	Report	Kempf 71'	Stadium: Signal Iduna Park; Attendance: 81,365; Referee: Benjamin Cortus

16 March 2019 26	VfB Stuttgart	1–1	1899 Hoffenheim	Stuttgart
15:30 CET (UTC+1)	Zuber 66'	Report	Kramarić 42'	Stadium: Mercedes-Benz Arena; Attendance: 56,743; Referee: Felix Zwayer

31 March 2019 27	Eintracht Frankfurt	3–0	VfB Stuttgart	Frankfurt
18:00 CEST (UTC+2)	Kostić 45', 64'; Jović 84'	Report		Stadium: Commerzbank-Arena; Attendance: 51,500; Referee: Felix Brych

6 April 2019 28	VfB Stuttgart	1–1	1. FC Nürnberg	Stuttgart
15:30 CEST (UTC+2)	Kabak 75'	Report	Pereira 42'	Stadium: Mercedes-Benz Arena; Attendance: 58,757; Referee: Frank Willenborg

13 April 2019 29	VfB Stuttgart	0–1	Bayer Leverkusen	Stuttgart
15:30 CEST (UTC+2)		Report	Havertz 64' (pen.)	Stadium: Mercedes-Benz Arena; Attendance: 53,657; Referee: Tobias Stieler

20 April 2019 30	FC Augsburg	6–0	VfB Stuttgart	Augsburg
15:30 CEST (UTC+2)	Khedira 11'; Hahn 18'; Max 29', 58'; Richter 53', 68'	Report		Stadium: WWK Arena; Attendance: 30,660; Referee: Manuel Gräfe

27 April 2019 31	VfB Stuttgart	1–0	Borussia Mönchengladbach	Stuttgart
18:30 CEST (UTC+2)	Donis 56'	Report		Stadium: Mercedes-Benz Arena; Attendance: 56,730; Referee: Bastian Dankert

4 May 2019 32	Hertha BSC	3–1	VfB Stuttgart	Berlin
15:30 CEST (UTC+2)	Ibišević 40'; Duda 45+1'; Kalou 67'	Report	Gómez 70'	Stadium: Olympiastadion Berlin; Attendance: 48,668; Referee: Daniel Schlager

11 May 2019 33	VfB Stuttgart	3–0	VfL Wolfsburg	Stuttgart
15:30 CEST (UTC+2)	Castro 45+1'; Donis 55'; Didavi 83'	Report		Stadium: Mercedes-Benz Arena; Attendance: 54,068; Referee: Felix Brych

18 May 2019 34	Schalke 04	0–0	VfB Stuttgart	Gelsenkirchen
15:30 CEST (UTC+2)		Report		Stadium: Veltins-Arena; Attendance: 61,676; Referee: Bibiana Steinhaus

==== Relegation play-offs ====
23 May 2019 First leg	VfB Stuttgart	2–2	Union Berlin	Stuttgart
20:30 CEST (UTC+2)	Gentner 41'; Gómez 51'	Report	Abdullahi 43'; Friedrich 68'	Stadium: Mercedes-Benz Arena; Attendance: 58,619; Referee: Bastian Dankert

27 May 2019 Second leg	Union Berlin	0–0 (2a–2 agg.)	VfB Stuttgart	Berlin
20:30 CEST (UTC+2)		Report		Stadium: Stadion An der Alten Försterei; Attendance: 22,012; Referee: Christian Dingert

=== DFB-Pokal ===
18 August 2018 First round	Hansa Rostock	2–0	VfB Stuttgart	Rostock
20:45 CEST (UTC+2)	Soukou 8'; Pepić 84'	Report		Stadium: Ostseestadion; Attendance: 23,000; Referee: Tobias Stieler

== Statistics ==
=== Appearances and goals ===
No.	Pos	Nat	Player	Total		Bundesliga		DFB-Pokal		Play-offs	
No.	Pos	Nat	Player	Apps	Goals	Apps	Goals	Apps	Goals	Apps	Goals
Goalkeepers
1	GK	(Germany) GER	Ron-Robert Zieler	37	0	34	0	1	0	2	0
13	GK	(Germany) GER	Jens Grahl	0	0	0	0	0	0	0	0
26	GK	(Germany) GER	Alexander Meyer	0	0	0	0	0	0	0	0
Defenders
2	DF	(Argentina) ARG	Emiliano Insúa	29	2	24+3	2	1	0	1	0
3	DF	(Germany) GER	Dennis Aogo	17	0	13+2	0	1	0	1	0
4	DF	(Germany) GER	Marc-Oliver Kempf	24	2	23	2	0	0	1	0
5	DF	(Germany) GER	Timo Baumgartl	19	1	18	1	1	0	0	0
7	DF	(Spain) ESP	Pablo Maffeo	9	0	8	0	1	0	0	0
18	DF	(Turkey) TUR	Ozan Kabak	17	3	15	3	0	0	2	0
21	DF	(France) FRA	Benjamin Pavard	31	0	29	0	0	0	2	0
23	DF	(Germany) GER	Antonis Aidonis	2	0	1+1	0	0	0	0	0
24	DF	(Croatia) CRO	Borna Sosa	12	0	7+5	0	0	0	0	0
28	DF	(Germany) GER	Holger Badstuber	11	0	4+5	0	1	0	1	0
32	DF	(Germany) GER	Andreas Beck	24	0	21+3	0	0	0	0	0
Midfielders
6	MF	(Argentina) ARG	Santiago Ascacíbar	28	0	27	0	0	0	1	0
8	MF	(Germany) GER	Gonzalo Castro	29	2	20+6	2	1	0	1+1	0
9	MF	(Switzerland) SUI	Steven Zuber	15	5	13	5	0	0	1+1	0
10	MF	(Germany) GER	Daniel Didavi	23	2	8+12	2	1	0	1+1	0
14	MF	(Germany) GER	Alexander Esswein	18	0	15+2	0	0	0	0+1	0
17	MF	(Germany) GER	Erik Thommy	20	1	6+13	1	1	0	0	0
19	MF	(Democratic Republic of the Congo) COD	Chadrac Akolo	24	0	5+16	0	0+1	0	2	0
20	MF	(Germany) GER	Christian Gentner	32	1	24+5	0	0+1	0	2	1
29	MF	(Poland) POL	David Kopacz	0	0	0	0	0	0	0	0
Forwards
11	FW	(Greece) GRE	Anastasios Donis	27	5	11+13	5	0+1	0	2	0
22	FW	(Argentina) ARG	Nicolás González	33	2	23+7	2	1	0	2	0
25	FW	(Germany) GER	Leon Dajaku	2	0	0+2	0	0	0	0	0
27	FW	(Germany) GER	Mario Gómez	34	8	25+6	7	1	0	0+2	1
Players transferred out during the season
31	MF	(Turkey) TUR	Berkay Özcan	3	0	0+3	0	0	0	0	0
36	MF	(Ghana) GHA	Hans Nunoo Sarpei	2	0	0+2	0	0	0	0	0

Last updated: 27 May 2019
Source: Competitions
