= Benjamin Pavard =

French footballer (born 1996)

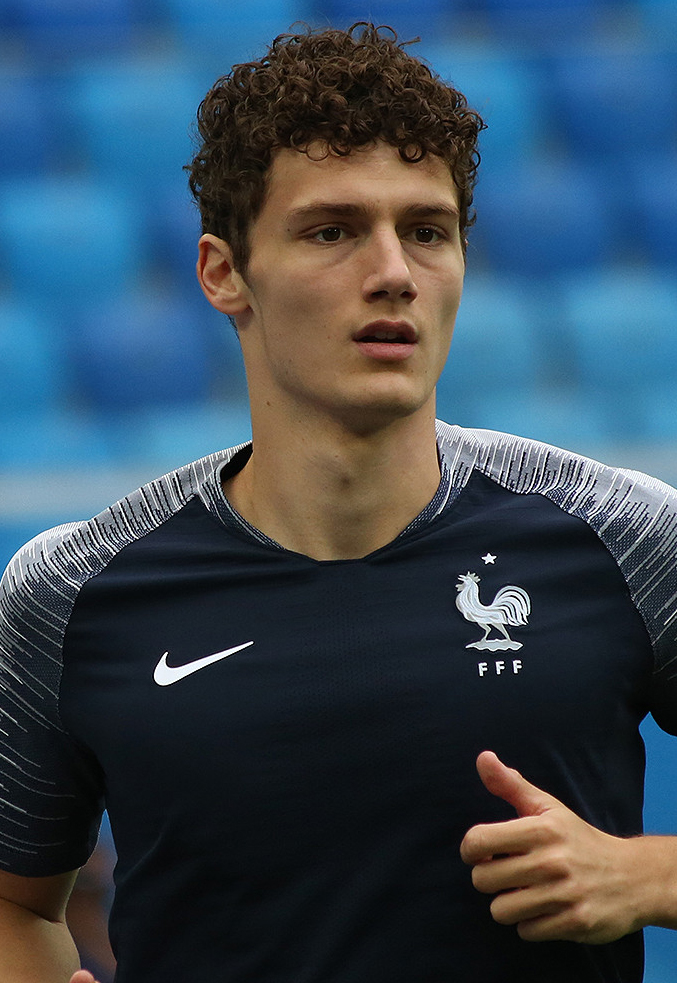
- Pavard with France at the 2018 FIFA World Cup

Personal information
- Full name: Benjamin Jacques Marcel Pavard
- Date of birth: 28 March 1996 (age 30)
- Place of birth: Maubeuge, Nord, France
- Height: 1.86 m (6 ft 1 in)
- Positions: Centre-back; right-back

Team information
- Current team: Inter Milan
- Number: 28

Youth career
- 2002–2005: US Jeumont
- 2005–2015: Lille

Senior career*
Years	Team	Apps	(Gls)
2014–2016	Lille II	20	(1)
2015–2016	Lille	21	(0)
2016–2019	VfB Stuttgart	84	(2)
2019–2023	Bayern Munich	111	(8)
2023–	Inter Milan	52	(0)
2025–2026	→ Marseille (loan)	27	(1)

International career^{‡}
2015	France U19	4	(0)
2015–2017	France U21	15	(0)
2017–	France	55	(5)
Medal record
Men's football
Representing France
FIFA World Cup
Winner	2018 Russia
Runner-up	2022 Qatar
UEFA Nations League
Winner	2021 Italy
Third place	2025 Germany
- * Club domestic league appearances and goals as of 22:36, 22 November 2026 (UTC) ‡ National team caps and goals as of 23:01, 17 November 2024 (UTC)

Benjamin Jacques Marcel Pavard (French pronunciation: [bɛ̃ʒamɛ̃ ʒak maʁsɛl pavaʁ]; born 28 March 1996) is a French professional footballer who plays as a defender for Serie A club Inter Milan and the France national team. Although usually deployed as a centre-back, he is also capable of operating as a right-back.

He began his career at Lille in Ligue 1 and transferred to VfB Stuttgart in 2016, where he won the 2. Bundesliga in his first season. In January 2019, he agreed a move to Bayern Munich, which was completed after Stuttgart's relegation at the end of the season. In 2020, he completed a historic sextuple by winning the Bundesliga, DFB-Pokal, Champions League, DFL-Supercup, UEFA Super Cup, and FIFA Club World Cup. In the summer of 2023, Pavard moved to Inter Milan, winning the Serie A title in his first season. He then returned to France in 2025, moving to Marseille on loan.

Pavard made his international debut for France in November 2017, and won the 2018 FIFA World Cup and the 2020–21 UEFA Nations League, also featuring at the 2020 and 2024 editions of the UEFA European Championships, and the 2022 World Cup, where France finished as runners-up at the latter. He is also remembered for his volley in the round of 16 against Argentina in the 2018 World Cup, which was voted as the Goal of the Tournament.

== Early life ==
Benjamin Jacques Marcel Pavard was born on 28 March 1996 in Maubeuge, Nord, France.

== Club career ==
=== Early career ===
Pavard first joined the youth ranks of his hometown club, US Jeumont in 2002; former France international striker Jean-Pierre Papin also began his career at the club.

Spotted by Jean-Michel Vandamme, Pavard joined Lille's academy at the age of nine. He made his Ligue 1 debut on 31 January 2015 against FC Nantes, playing the full game in a 1–1 away draw. Pavard made 21 league appearances across two seasons for Lille, before leaving the club in 2016.

=== VfB Stuttgart ===
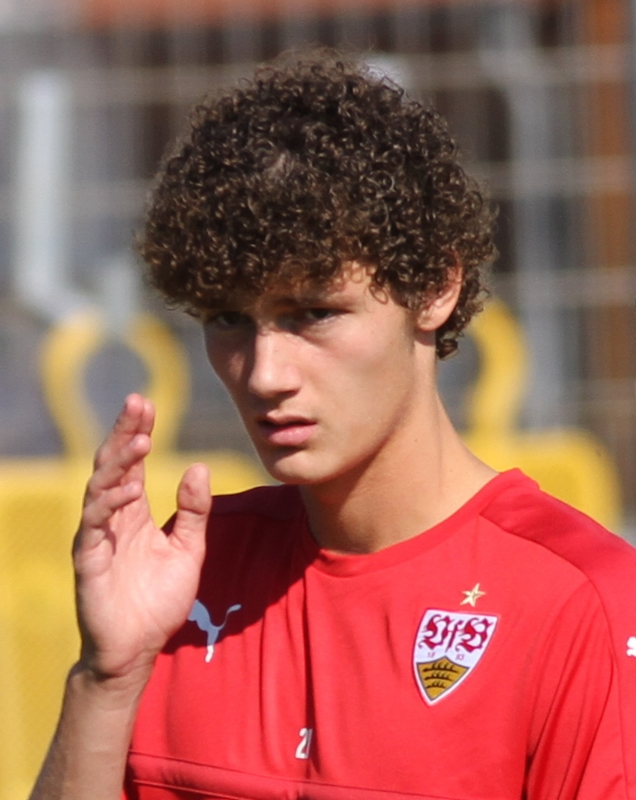
Pavard training with VfB Stuttgart in 2016

On 30 August 2016, Pavard moved to VfB Stuttgart, signing a four-year contract. He made his debut in the 2. Bundesliga on 3 October, scoring in a 4–0 home win over SpVgg Greuther Fürth. He played 21 games and his team ended the season as league champions.

Pavard made his Bundesliga debut on 19 August in a 2–0 loss at Hertha BSC. He scored his first goal in the Bundesliga with a back header on 29 October in a 3–0 win over SC Freiburg at the Mercedes-Benz Arena. He extended his contract with Stuttgart on 20 December 2017 until 30 June 2021.

He was one of only four players to feature in every single second of the 2017–18 Bundesliga season. He played in several positions, namely right-back, centre-back, defensive midfielder and right wing, but after the appointment of Tayfun Korkut as manager in January 2018 he was exclusively a centre back; the team conceded 10 goals in their last 14 games as they went from near the relegation places to finish 7th, only just missing out on a UEFA Europa League place.

In 2018–19, Pavard was again a regular as Stuttgart fought to avoid relegation all season, with his team ultimately going down after losing to 1. FC Union Berlin in the relegation play-offs.

=== Bayern Munich ===
On 9 January 2019, Bayern Munich confirmed Pavard would join the club for the 2019–20 season, signing a five-year contract lasting until 30 June 2024.

He made his competitive debut on 3 August in a 2–0 defeat in the 2019 DFL-Supercup against Borussia Dortmund, as an 80th-minute substitute for Thiago Alcântara. On 31 August, he scored his first goal for the club to equalise in a 6–1 home win over Mainz 05. On 11 February 2021, Pavard scored Bayern's only goal in a 1–0 win against Tigres UANL in the 2020 FIFA Club World Cup Final, as the club won its sixth trophy in a year.

On 26 October 2022, he scored his first UEFA Champions League goal in a 3–0 away win against Barcelona. A week later, he scored a goal in a 2–0 victory against Inter Milan, in which Bayern Munich finished top of their Group C with six wins from six matches for the second consecutive season. On 11 March 2023, he scored a first-half brace in a 5–3 home win over FC Augsburg. Pavard made 163 competitive appearances for Bayern, scoring 12 goals in the process.

=== Inter Milan ===
On 30 August 2023, Serie A side Inter Milan signed Pavard on a five-year deal worth €30 million, which could rise up to €32 million with add-ons. Hence, he became Serie A's most expensive signing in the 2023 summer transfer window. Pavard made his official club debut on 24 September, starting in Inter's 1–0 win away to Empoli. On 4 November, he suffered a dislocated kneecap during a match against Atalanta, ruling him out of action for roughly six weeks. On 22 April 2024, Pavard assisted a goal in Inter's 2–1 victory over rivals AC Milan that confirmed his side as the season's Serie A champions.

On 16 April 2025, Pavard scored his first goal for Inter in a 2–2 draw against his former club Bayern Munich in the second leg of the UEFA Champions League quarter-finals, helping his side progress by winning 4–3 on aggregate.

==== Loan to Marseille ====
Pavard was loaned to Ligue 1 side Marseille on 1 September 2025, effectively returning to his native country.

== International career ==
On 6 November 2017, Pavard was selected by France's head coach Didier Deschamps for the friendly matches against Wales and Germany. He made his debut against the Welsh on 10 November in a 2–0 win at the Stade de France, replacing Christophe Jallet at half time.

On 17 May 2018, he was called up to the 23-man French squad for the 2018 FIFA World Cup in Russia. On 16 June, Pavard made his World Cup debut in a 2–1 victory over Australia. On 30 June, Pavard scored his first international goal, a curling half-volley strike from outside the penalty area, in a 4–3 victory over Argentina in the World Cup's round of 16. The goal was later voted as the Goal of the Tournament, and nominated for the Puskas Award of the year. He also became the first French defender to score a goal in the World Cup since Lilian Thuram scored against Croatia in the 1998 semi-final. Pavard won the World Cup, after starting all of France's games except for their last group match against Denmark.

At UEFA Euro 2020, Pavard suffered a head injury in France's opening 1–0 win over Germany, but continued playing. He said after the game that he felt "a little knocked out for 10 to 15 seconds". This appeared to break UEFA's protocol that a player showing signs of concussion should be withdrawn from the match, whether or not he or the manager agreed with it. After analysing reports by the French team's doctors, UEFA concluded that Pavard never lost consciousness and it was right for him to play on.

On 9 November 2022, he was called up to the 25-man French squad for the 2022 FIFA World Cup in Qatar. On 27 March 2023, he scored the winning goal as France beat the Republic of Ireland 1–0 in a UEFA Euro 2024 qualifying match.

On 17 October 2023, Pavard was handed the captain's armband for the first time after captain Kylian Mbappé was substituted off during the final few minutes of a friendly between France and Scotland, which France won 4–1. In the match, Pavard scored France's first two goals, both of which were headers, becoming the first player to score two headed goals in the same game for France since Zinedine Zidane in the 1998 FIFA World Cup final.

== Personal life ==
In July 2024, Pavard announced his engagement to Kleofina Pnishi, an actress, model and Miss Provence 2017. They married in the summer of 2025.

== Career statistics ==
=== Club ===
As of match played 22 November 2026

Appearances and goals by club, season and competition
Club	Season	League			National cup (Note: Includes Coupe de France, DFB-Pokal, Coppa Italia)		League cup (Note: Includes Coupe de la Ligue)		Europe		Other		Total	
Club	Season	Division	Apps	Goals	Apps	Goals	Apps	Goals	Apps	Goals	Apps	Goals	Apps	Goals
Lille II	2014–15	CFA	15	0	—		—		—		—		15	0
Lille II	2015–16	CFA 2	4	0	—		—		—		–		4	0
Lille II	2016–17	CFA	1	1	—		—		—		—		1	1
Lille II	Total		20	1	—		—		—		—		20	1
Lille	2014–15	Ligue 1	8	0	0	0	0	0	—		—		8	0
Lille	2015–16	Ligue 1	13	0	1	0	3	0	—		—		17	0
Lille	Total		21	0	1	0	3	0	—		—		25	0
VfB Stuttgart	2016–17	2. Bundesliga	21	1	0	0	—		—		—		21	1
VfB Stuttgart	2017–18	Bundesliga	34	1	2	0	—		—		—		36	1
VfB Stuttgart	2018–19	Bundesliga	29	0	0	0	—		—		2 (Note: Appearances in Bundesliga promotion play-offs)	0	31	0
VfB Stuttgart	Total		84	2	2	0	—		—		2	0	88	2
Bayern Munich	2019–20	Bundesliga	32	4	6	0	—		8 (Note: Appearances in UEFA Champions League)	0	1 (Note: Appearance in DFL-Supercup)	0	47	4
Bayern Munich	2020–21	Bundesliga	24	0	1	0	—		7	0	4 (Note: One appearance in UEFA Super Cup, one appearance in DFL-Supercup, two appearances and one goal in FIFA Club World Cup)	1	36	1
Bayern Munich	2021–22	Bundesliga	25	0	1	0	—		10	0	0	0	36	0
Bayern Munich	2022–23	Bundesliga	30	4	3	0	—		9	2	1	1	43	7
Bayern Munich	2023–24	Bundesliga	0	0	—		—		—		1	0	1	0
Bayern Munich	Total		111	8	11	0	—		34	2	7	2	163	12
Inter Milan	2023–24	Serie A	23	0	1	0	—		5	0	2 (Note: Appearances in Supercoppa Italiana)	0	31	0
Inter Milan	2024–25	Serie A	23	0	2	0	—		12	1	1 (Note: Appearance in FIFA Club World Cup)	0	38	1
Inter Milan	2025–26	Serie A	1	0	—		—		—		—		1	0
Inter Milan	2026–27	Serie A	5	0	0	0	—		2	0	0	0	7	0
Inter Milan	Total		52	0	3	0	—		19	1	3	0	77	1
Marseille (loan)	2025–26	Ligue 1	27	1	2	0	—		6	0	1 (Note: Appearance in Trophée des Champions)	0	36	1
Career total			315	12	19	0	3	0	59	3	13	2	409	17

=== International ===
As of match played 17 November 2024

Appearances and goals by national team and year
National team	Year	Apps	Goals
France	2017	2	0
France	2018	16	1
France	2019	9	0
France	2020	4	1
France	2021	11	0
France	2022	5	0
France	2023	5	3
France	2024	3	0
Total		55	5

As of match played 17 October 2023
France score listed first, score column indicates score after each Pavard goal

List of international goals scored by Benjamin Pavard
No.	Date	Venue	Cap	Opponent	Score	Result	Competition	Ref.
1	30 June 2018	Kazan Arena, Kazan, Russia	9	Argentina	2–2	4–3	2018 FIFA World Cup	
2	17 November 2020	Stade de France, Saint-Denis, France	31	Sweden	2–1	4–2	2020–21 UEFA Nations League A	
3	27 March 2023	Aviva Stadium, Dublin, Ireland	48	Republic of Ireland	1–0	1–0	UEFA Euro 2024 qualifying	
4	17 October 2023	Stade Pierre-Mauroy, Lille, France	52	Scotland	1–1	4–1	Friendly	
5	17 October 2023	Stade Pierre-Mauroy, Lille, France	52	Scotland	2–1	4–1	Friendly	

== Honours ==
VfB Stuttgart

- 2. Bundesliga: 2016–17

Bayern Munich

- Bundesliga: 2019–20, 2020–21, 2021–22 2022–23
- DFB-Pokal: 2019–20
- DFL-Supercup: 2020, 2021, 2022
- UEFA Champions League: 2019–20
- UEFA Super Cup: 2020
- FIFA Club World Cup: 2020

Inter Milan

- Serie A: 2023–24
- Supercoppa Italiana: 2023
- UEFA Champions League runner-up: 2024–25

France

- FIFA World Cup: 2018; runner-up: 2022
- UEFA Nations League: 2020–21; third place: 2024–25

Individual

- Bundesliga Rookie of the Month: February 2018
- FIFA World Cup Goal of the Tournament: 2018
- UEFA Champions League Breakthrough XI: 2019
- kicker Bundesliga Team of the Season: 2019–20

Orders

- Knight of the Legion of Honour: 2018
