= Berkay Özcan =

Turkish footballer

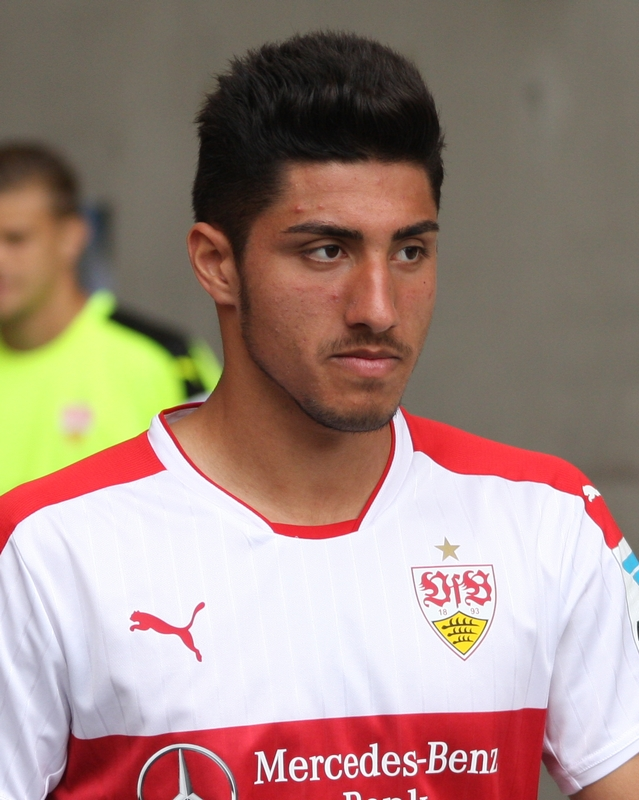
- Berkay Özcan playing for VfB Stuttgart in 2016

Personal information
- Date of birth: 15 February 1998 (age 28)
- Place of birth: Karlsruhe, Germany
- Height: 1.78 m (5 ft 10 in)
- Position: Central midfielder

Team information
- Current team: İstanbul Başakşehir
- Number: 19

Youth career
- FC Südstern 06
- 2012–2013: Karlsruher SC
- 2013–2016: VfB Stuttgart

Senior career*
Years	Team	Apps	(Gls)
2016–2019	VfB Stuttgart	41	(3)
2017–2018	VfB Stuttgart II	4	(0)
2019–2020	Hamburger SV	15	(1)
2019–2020	→ İstanbul Başakşehir (loan)	19	(0)
2020–	İstanbul Başakşehir	149	(8)
2025	→ Çaykur Rizespor (loan)	14	(1)
2025–2026	→ Fatih Karagümrük (loan)	33	(0)

International career^{‡}
2013	Germany U15	5	(1)
2014	Turkey U16	4	(0)
2014–2015	Turkey U17	6	(0)
2015	Turkey U18	1	(0)
2015–2017	Turkey U19	13	(5)
2016–2019	Turkey U21	10	(1)
2018–	Turkey	7	(0)
- * Club domestic league appearances and goals as of 11 October 2026 ‡ National team caps and goals as of 19 November 2022 (UTC)

Berkay Özcan (born 15 February 1998) is a professional footballer who plays as a central midfielder for Süper Lig club İstanbul Başakşehir. Born in Germany, he represented it internationally as a junior, before switching allegiance to Turkey.

== Club career ==
=== VfB Stuttgart ===
On 6 November 2015, Özcan extended his contract with VfB Stuttgart until June 2019. He made his debut for the first team of VfB Stuttgart on 8 August 2016 against FC St. Pauli. He finished the 2016–17 season with three goals in 23 appearances. On 3 December 2017 Özcan signed a new four-year-contract, keeping him at VfB Stuttgart until June 2021. He finished the 2017–18 season with a goal in 20 appearances.

=== Hamburger SV ===
On 25 January 2019, Özcan joined Hamburger SV on a four-and-half-year-deal.

=== Loan to İstanbul Başakşehir ===
On 2 September 2019 İstanbul Başakşehir confirmed, that they had signed Özcan on a season-long loan deal. On 3 July 2020 the loan became permanent and Özcan signed permanently for the club.

== International career ==
Özcan was born in Germany to Turkish parents. He is a youth international for Germany, and Turkey.

He made his debut for the Turkish senior team on 1 June 2018 against Tunisia.

== Career statistics ==
As of matches played on 26 November 2018

Club	Season	League			Cup		Total		Ref.
Club	Season	Division	Apps	Goals	Apps	Goals	Apps	Goals	Ref.
VfB Stuttgart	2016–17	2. Bundesliga	21	2	2	1	23	3	
VfB Stuttgart	2017–18	Bundesliga	17	1	3	0	20	1	
VfB Stuttgart	2018–19	Bundesliga	3	0	0	0	3	0	
VfB Stuttgart	Totals		41	3	5	1	46	4	—
VfB Stuttgart II	2017–18	Regionalliga Südwest	4	0	—		4	0	
Career totals			45	3	5	1	50	4	—

== Honours ==
İstanbul Başakşehir

- Süper Lig: 2019–20
