= Simon Terodde =

German footballer (born 1988)

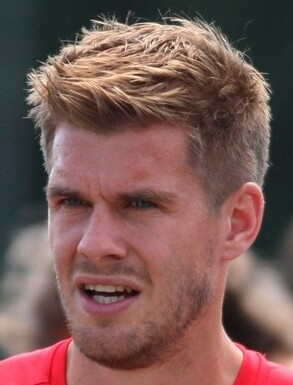
- Terodde in 2016

Personal information
- Full name: Simon Terodde
- Date of birth: 2 March 1988 (age 38)
- Place of birth: Bocholt, West Germany
- Height: 1.92 m (6 ft 4 in)
- Position: Striker

Youth career
- 1991–1998: SV Krechting
- 1998–2001: VfL Rhede
- 2001–2002: 1. FC Bocholt
- 2002–2007: MSV Duisburg

Senior career*
Years	Team	Apps	(Gls)
2007–2009	MSV Duisburg II	20	(12)
2007–2009	MSV Duisburg	2	(0)
2009	→ Fortuna Düsseldorf (loan)	8	(1)
2009	→ Fortuna Düsseldorf II (loan)	1	(0)
2009–2012	1. FC Köln	5	(0)
2009–2011	→ 1. FC Köln II	52	(20)
2011–2012	→ Union Berlin (loan)	27	(8)
2012–2014	Union Berlin	60	(15)
2014–2016	VfL Bochum	66	(41)
2016–2017	VfB Stuttgart	47	(27)
2018–2020	1. FC Köln	71	(37)
2020–2021	Hamburger SV	33	(24)
2021–2024	Schalke 04	90	(40)
Total		482	(225)
- * Club domestic league appearances and goals

Simon Terodde (born 2 March 1988) is a German former professional footballer who played as a striker.

He is the current goalscoring record holder of the 2. Bundesliga, with 177 goals, having been the season top-scorer four times, for VfL Bochum in 2016, VfB Stuttgart in 2017, 1. FC Köln in 2019 and Schalke 04 in 2022, winning the division title with all but Bochum.

== Football career ==
=== MSV Duisburg ===
Playing for MSV Duisburg, Terodde was the top goalscorer of the Under 19 Bundesliga West in the 2006–07 season scoring 21 goals. His first professional appearance for Duisburg came against FC Ingolstadt 04 in the 2. Bundesliga on 19 October 2008.

In January 2009, he agreed to a contract extension until 2010 before joining Fortuna Düsseldorf of the 3. Liga on loan for the second half of the 2008–09 season.

=== 1. FC Köln ===
After seven years, Terodde left Duisburg and signed a two-year contract with 1. FC Köln where he mostly played for the reserve team. In the summer of 2011 he joined Union Berlin on loan. In April 2012, he completed the transfer to Union Berlin on a permanent basis agreeing to a contract running until 2015.

=== VfL Bochum ===
In 2014, Terodde signed for VfL Bochum. He was the 2. Bundesliga top scorer in his second season with 25 goals in 33 games, including a hat-trick at 1. FC Heidenheim on the final day in a 4–2 win.

=== VfB Stuttgart ===
In June 2016, Terodde moved to VfB Stuttgart. He again became top-scorer in the 2016–17 2. Bundesliga (25 goals in 32 games) and the team was promoted as champions. On 6 November 2016, he scored a hat-trick in a 3–1 win over Arminia Bielefeld at the Mercedes-Benz Arena.

In May 2017, Terodde signed a new two-year contract with an option for a further season.

=== Return to Köln ===
On 20 December 2017, it was announced Terodde would return to former club 1. FC Köln from 1 January 2018. He signed a deal until 30 June 2021. He scored three times in his first two games, eventually finishing with five in 15 as the team were relegated in last place.

He scored four times on 19 August 2018, as Köln came from behind to win 9–1 at Berliner FC Dynamo in the first round of the cup. On 28 September 2018 he scored his 100th 2.Bundesliga goal in a 1–3 win against Arminia Bielefeld. He scored a total of 29 2. Bundesliga goals in 2018–19 season and won his third 2. Bundesliga top scorer title.

=== Hamburger SV ===
In August 2020, it was announced that Terodde would return to the second tier and join Hamburger SV on a free transfer, signing a one-year contract. With two braces in the first two games, he replaced Sven Demandt (121) as the record goalscorer in the single division 2. Bundesliga, played since 1981, with 122 goals. In the all-time top scorer list of the 2. Bundesliga, which has been played since 1974, Terodde is third behind Dieter Schatzschneider (153) and Karl-Heinz Mödrath (151).

=== Schalke 04 ===
On 2 May 2021, Terodde agreed to join Bundesliga relegated Schalke 04 on a free transfer for the 2021–22 season with an option for a further year. He scored on his debut vs. his former club, Hamburger SV in a 3–1 loss.

On 3 October 2021, he scored his 11th goal of the season in a 3–0 win against FC Ingolstadt 04 on matchday 9, making him the record scorer in the 2. Bundesliga with 153 goals together with Dieter Schatzschneider. He became the sole record holder with his goal in a 1–1 draw against Werder Bremen on 20 November 2021. At the end of the season, he was promoted to the Bundesliga with Schalke and became the 2. Bundesliga top scorer for the fourth time with 30 goals in 30 appearances.

He was appointed team's captain under head coach Thomas Reis at the beginning of the 2023–24 season after Schalke was relegated again.

On 9 May 2024, Terodde announced his retirement from professional football at the end of the season.

== Career statistics ==
Appearances and goals by club, season and competition
Club	Season	League			DFB-Pokal		Total	
Club	Season	Division	Apps	Goals	Apps	Goals	Apps	Goals
MSV Duisburg II	2007–08	Oberliga Nordrhein	7	5	—		7	5
MSV Duisburg II	2008–09	NRW-Liga	13	7	—		13	7
MSV Duisburg II	Total		20	12	—		20	12
MSV Duisburg	2007–08	Bundesliga	0	0	0	0	0	0
MSV Duisburg	2008–09	2. Bundesliga	2	0	0	0	2	0
MSV Duisburg	Total		2	0	0	0	2	0
Fortuna Düsseldorf II	2008–09	NRW-Liga	1	0	—		1	0
Fortuna Düsseldorf	2008–09	3. Liga	8	1	—		8	1
1. FC Köln II	2009–10	Regionalliga West	31	8	—		31	8
1. FC Köln II	2010–11	Regionalliga West	21	12	—		21	12
1. FC Köln II	Total		52	20	—		52	20
1. FC Köln	2009–10	Bundesliga	0	0	0	0	0	0
1. FC Köln	2010–11	Bundesliga	5	0	2	1	7	1
1. FC Köln	Total		5	0	2	1	7	1
Union Berlin	2011–12	2. Bundesliga	27	8	1	1	28	9
Union Berlin	2012–13	2. Bundesliga	33	10	2	1	35	11
Union Berlin	2013–14	2. Bundesliga	27	5	3	0	30	5
Union Berlin	Total		87	23	6	2	93	25
VfL Bochum	2014–15	2. Bundesliga	33	16	2	3	35	19
VfL Bochum	2015–16	2. Bundesliga	33	25	4	3	37	28
VfL Bochum	Total		66	41	6	6	72	47
VfB Stuttgart	2016–17	2. Bundesliga	32	25	1	0	33	25
VfB Stuttgart	2017–18	Bundesliga	15	2	2	1	17	3
VfB Stuttgart	Total		47	27	3	1	50	28
1. FC Köln	2017–18	Bundesliga	15	5	—		15	5
1. FC Köln	2018–19	2. Bundesliga	33	29	2	4	35	33
1. FC Köln	2019–20	Bundesliga	23	3	2	1	25	4
1. FC Köln	Total		71	37	4	5	75	42
Hamburger SV	2020–21	2. Bundesliga	33	24	1	0	34	24
Schalke 04	2021–22	2. Bundesliga	30	30	2	0	32	30
Schalke 04	2022–23	Bundesliga	32	5	1	0	33	5
Schalke 04	2023–24	2. Bundesliga	28	5	2	0	30	5
Schalke 04	Total		90	40	5	0	95	40
Career total			482	225	27	15	509	240

== Honours ==
=== Club ===
VfB Stuttgart

- 2. Bundesliga: 2016–17

1. FC Köln

- 2. Bundesliga: 2018–19

Schalke 04

- 2. Bundesliga: 2021–22

=== Individual ===
- 2. Bundesliga top scorer: 2015–16, 2016–17, 2018–19, 2021–22
