= Josip Brekalo =

Croatian footballer (born 1998)

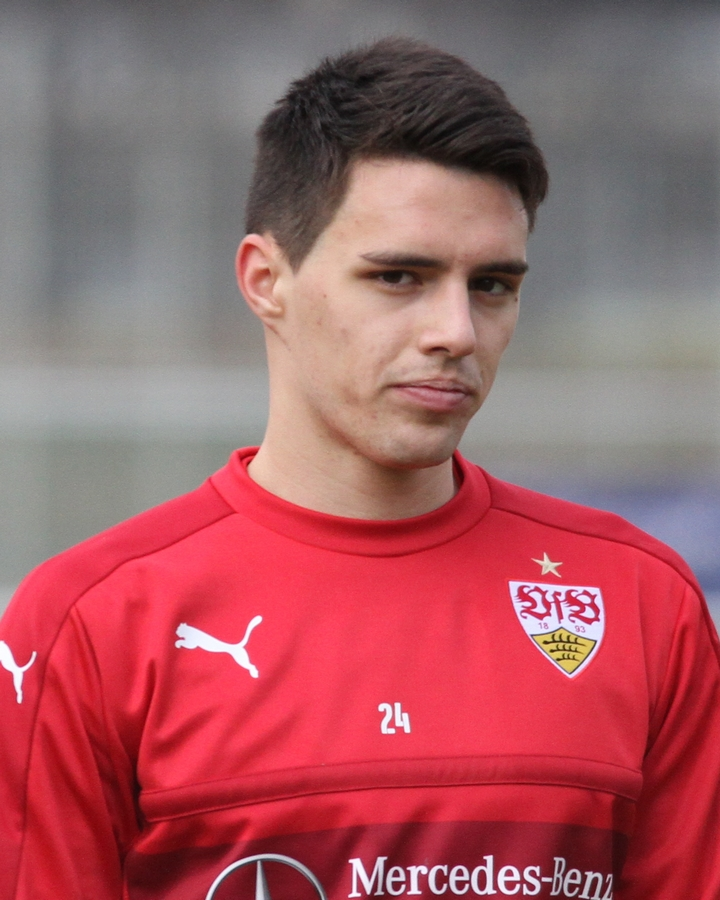
- Brekalo with VfB Stuttgart in 2017

Personal information
- Date of birth: 23 June 1998 (age 28)
- Place of birth: Zagreb, Croatia
- Height: 1.75 m (5 ft 9 in)
- Position: Left winger

Team information
- Current team: Hertha BSC
- Number: 7

Youth career
- 2006–2015: Dinamo Zagreb

Senior career*
| Years | Team | Apps | (Gls) |
| 2015–2016 | Dinamo Zagreb II | 9 | (0) |
| 2015–2016 | Dinamo Zagreb | 8 | (0) |
| 2016 | VfL Wolfsburg II | 2 | (0) |
| 2016–2023 | VfL Wolfsburg | 108 | (16) |
| 2017–2018 | → VfB Stuttgart (loan) | 25 | (2) |
| 2021–2022 | → Torino (loan) | 32 | (7) |
| 2023–2025 | Fiorentina | 17 | (1) |
| 2024 | → Hajduk Split (loan) | 14 | (2) |
| 2024–2025 | → Kasımpaşa (loan) | 23 | (4) |
| 2025–2026 | Oviedo | 14 | (0) |
| 2026– | Hertha BSC | 23 | (8) |

International career
| 2012 | Croatia U14 | 2 | (0) |
| 2013 | Croatia U15 | 2 | (0) |
| 2013–2014 | Croatia U16 | 8 | (2) |
| 2013–2015 | Croatia U17 | 25 | (9) |
| 2015 | Croatia U18 | 6 | (3) |
| 2015–2017 | Croatia U19 | 17 | (6) |
| 2016–2019 | Croatia U21 | 17 | (9) |
| 2018–2023 | Croatia | 35 | (4) |
- * Club domestic league appearances and goals as of 18 May 2026

Josip Brekalo (Croatian pronunciation: [jǒsip brěːkalo]; born 23 June 1998) is a Croatian professional footballer who plays as a left winger for German 2. Bundesliga club Hertha BSC.

== Club career ==
Brekalo is a youth exponent from Dinamo Zagreb. He made his league debut on 19 December 2015 against Inter Zaprešić. On 15 May 2016, he signed for Bundesliga club VfL Wolfsburg for €10 million.

On 31 January 2017, Brekalo was loaned out to VfB Stuttgart until the end of the season with an option for a further year. The loan deal was initially automatically extended until June 2018 when Stuttgart secured promotion. Brekalo scored his first senior goal on 17 February 2017 coming off the bench for VfB Stuttgart against 1. FC Heidenheim. Brekalo returned from loan back to Wolfsburg on 1 January 2018. On 8 May 2021, he scored his first career hat-trick in a 3–0 victory over Union Berlin.

On 31 August 2021, Brekalo joined Serie A side Torino on loan with an obligation to buy.

On 28 January 2023, Brekalo returned to Italy and signed with Fiorentina on a permanent deal.

On 29 January 2024, Brekalo returned to Croatia, moving to Hajduk Split on loan for the remainder of the season.

On 7 September 2024, Brekalo moved to Turkish Süper Lig club Kasımpaşa on a season-long loan.

On 21 August 2025, Brekalo joined Spanish La Liga side Real Oviedo permanently, signing a two-year contract until 2027.

On 2 February 2026, Brekalo signed with Hertha BSC in German 2. Bundesliga. He was named captain of the side for the 2026-27 season.

== International career ==
Having represented various Croatian youth teams, Brekalo debuted for the senior squad on 15 November 2018 in a 3–2 Nations League victory against Spain. On 8 September 2020, he scored his first national team goal in a 4–2 Nations League defeat to France.

On 1 June 2021, Brekalo was named in Zlatko Dalić's final 26-man Croatia squad for Euro 2020.

On 31 October 2022, he was named in the preliminary 34-man squad for the 2022 FIFA World Cup but did not make the final 26.

== Style of play ==
Brekalo usually plays on the left or right wing for both club and country. However, he played some international matches on different positions. In the 2018–19 UEFA Nations League, he played as a right back in absence of Šime Vrsaljko. In the 2020–21 UEFA Nations League, he was used as one of two false 9 strikers in 4–1–2–1–2 formation, a lineup which does not support wingers.

== Personal life ==
Brekalo's father Ante (nicknamed Šargija) is a former footballer, having represented Bosnia and Herzegovina on various youth levels, as he hails from the Bosnian region of Posavina. His career was halted at the age of 21, when the Yugoslav Wars broke out and he got wounded on the battlefield.

On 2 June 2021, Brekalo and his partner Dominika Kralj became parents of a girl, whom they named Nika. On 17 July, Brekalo and Kralj married in Zagreb.

== Controversy ==
In the summer of 2018, after VfL Wolfsburg decided that captains of all their teams would wear an LGBTQ armband during the 2018–19 season, Brekalo sparked controversy in German and Croatian media after stating that he would not like to wear a captain's armband with LGBT flag colours. The reason for that was cited to be the club's "stance for tolerant society" and "stance against discrimination". After "liking" homophobic comments under the club's Instagram post of captain Josuha Guilavogui wearing the armband, Brekalo blamed it on a mobile phone malfunction in an interview with Kicker. He went on to state:

"I have to say that I can't stand completely behind this action, because it contradicts my Christian belief. I've been raised religiously. I'm fine with people living a different lifestyle, because that's their business. But I don't want and don't have to carry a symbol representing them."

== Career statistics ==
=== Club ===
As of match played 25 January 2026

Appearances and goals by club, season and competition
| Club | Season | League | | | National cup (Note: Includes Croatian Cup, DFB-Pokal, Coppa Italia, Copa del Rey) | | Europe | | Other | | Total | |
| Club | Season | Division | Apps | Goals | Apps | Goals | Apps | Goals | Apps | Goals | Apps | Goals |
|---|---|---|---|---|---|---|---|---|---|---|---|---|
| Dinamo Zagreb II | 2015–16 | Druga HNL | 9 | 0 | — | | — | | — | | 9 | 0 |
| Dinamo Zagreb | 2015–16 | Prva HNL | 8 | 0 | 3 | 1 | — | | — | | 11 | 1 |
| VfL Wolfsburg II | 2016–17 | Regionalliga Nord | 2 | 0 | — | | — | | — | | 2 | 0 |
| VfL Wolfsburg | 2016–17 | Bundesliga | 4 | 0 | 0 | 0 | — | | — | | 4 | 0 |
| VfL Wolfsburg | 2017–18 | Bundesliga | 15 | 4 | 0 | 0 | — | | — | | 15 | 4 |
| VfL Wolfsburg | 2018–19 | Bundesliga | 25 | 3 | 2 | 0 | — | | — | | 27 | 3 |
| VfL Wolfsburg | 2019–20 | Bundesliga | 30 | 3 | 2 | 1 | 8 (Note: Appearances in UEFA Europa League) | 3 | — | | 40 | 7 |
| VfL Wolfsburg | 2020–21 | Bundesliga | 29 | 7 | 2 | 0 | 2 | 0 | — | | 33 | 7 |
| VfL Wolfsburg | 2021–22 | Bundesliga | 1 | 0 | 1 | 1 | 0 | 0 | — | | 2 | 1 |
| VfL Wolfsburg | 2022–23 | Bundesliga | 6 | 0 | 1 | 0 | — | | — | | 7 | 0 |
| VfL Wolfsburg | Total | | 110 | 17 | 8 | 2 | 10 | 3 | — | | 128 | 22 |
| VfB Stuttgart (loan) | 2016–17 | 2. Bundesliga | 11 | 1 | 0 | 0 | — | | — | | 11 | 1 |
| VfB Stuttgart (loan) | 2017–18 | Bundesliga | 14 | 1 | 3 | 1 | — | | — | | 17 | 2 |
| VfB Stuttgart (loan) | Total | | 25 | 2 | 3 | 1 | — | | — | | 28 | 3 |
| Torino (loan) | 2021–22 | Serie A | 32 | 7 | 1 | 0 | — | | — | | 33 | 7 |
| Fiorentina | 2022–23 | Serie A | 6 | 0 | 1 | 0 | 4 (Note: Appearances in UEFA Europa Conference League) | 0 | — | | 11 | 0 |
| Fiorentina | 2023–24 | Serie A | 11 | 1 | 1 | 0 | 5 | 0 | 1 (Note: Appearance in Supercoppa Italiana) | 0 | 18 | 1 |
| Fiorentina | Total | | 17 | 1 | 2 | 0 | 9 | 0 | 1 | 0 | 29 | 1 |
| Hajduk Split (loan) | 2023–24 | HNL | 14 | 2 | 2 | 0 | — | | — | | 16 | 2 |
| Kasımpaşa (loan) | 2024–25 | Süper Lig | 23 | 4 | 0 | 0 | — | | — | | 23 | 4 |
| Oviedo | 2025–26 | La Liga | 14 | 0 | 1 | 1 | — | | — | | 15 | 1 |
| Hertha BSC | 2025-26 | 2. Bundesliga | 11 | 3 | 1 | 0 | — | | — | | 12 | 3 |
| Hertha BSC | 2026-27 | 2. Bundesliga | 12 | 5 | 2 | 1 | — | | — | | 14 | 6 |
| Hertha BSC | Total | | 23 | 8 | 3 | 1 | 9 | 0 | 1 | 0 | 26 | 9 |
| Career total | | | 277 | 41 | 23 | 6 | 19 | 3 | 1 | 0 | 320 | 50 |

=== International ===
As of match played 15 October 2023

Appearances and goals by national team and year
| National team | Year | Apps | Goals |
|---|---|---|---|
| Croatia | 2018 | 2 | 0 |
| Croatia | 2019 | 9 | 0 |
| Croatia | 2020 | 8 | 3 |
| Croatia | 2021 | 11 | 1 |
| Croatia | 2022 | 3 | 0 |
| Croatia | 2023 | 2 | 0 |
| Total | | 35 | 4 |

Scores and results list Croatia's goal tally first. Score column indicates score after each Brekalo goal.

List of international goals scored by Josip Brekalo
| No. | Date | Venue | Cap | Opponent | Score | Result | Competition |
|---|---|---|---|---|---|---|---|
| 1 | 8 September 2020 | Stade de France, Saint-Denis, France | 13 | France | 2–2 | 2–4 | 2020–21 UEFA Nations League A |
| 2 | 7 October 2020 | Kybunpark, St. Gallen, Switzerland | 14 | Switzerland | 1–1 | 2–1 | Friendly |
| 3 | 11 November 2020 | Vodafone Park, Istanbul, Turkey | 17 | Turkey | 3–2 | 3–3 | Friendly |
| 4 | 30 March 2021 | Stadion Rujevica, Rijeka, Croatia | 22 | Malta | 3–0 | 3–0 | 2022 FIFA World Cup qualification |

== Honours ==
Dinamo Zagreb

- Croatian First League: 2015–16
- Croatian Cup: 2015–16

Stuttgart

- Bundesliga 2: 2016–17

Fiorentina

- Coppa Italia runner-up: 2022–23
- UEFA Europa Conference League runner-up: 2022–23

Individual

- UEFA European Under-17 Championship Team of the Tournament: 2015
