= Lasse Schlüter =

German footballer

Personal information
- Date of birth: 27 April 1992 (age 34)
- Place of birth: Hamburg, Germany
- Height: 1.85 m (6 ft 1 in)
- Position: Left-back

Youth career
- –2006: SC Poppenbüttel
- 2006–2011: Hamburger SV

Senior career*
Years	Team	Apps	(Gls)
2011–2012	Hamburger SV II	13	(0)
2012–2014	FC St. Pauli II	58	(4)
2014–2016	Wacker Nordhausen	54	(2)
2015–2016	Wacker Nordhausen II	3	(0)
2016–2019	Energie Cottbus	91	(8)
2019–2022	Eintracht Braunschweig	59	(0)
- * Club domestic league appearances and goals as of 14 May 2022

Lasse Schlüter (born 27 April 1992) is a German professional footballer who plays as a left-back.
