= Patrick Ittrich =

German football referee (born 1979)

- Born: 3 January 1979 (age 47); Hamburg, West Germany
- Other occupation: Police officer

Domestic
Years	League	Role
2003–2026	DFB	Referee
2009–2026	2. Bundesliga	Referee
2016–2026	Bundesliga	Referee

Patrick Ittrich (born 3 January 1979) is a German football referee who is based in Hamburg. He referees for Mümmelmannsberger SV of the Hamburg Football Association.

== Refereeing career ==
Ittrich, referee of the club Mümmelmannsberger SV, has been a DFB level referee since 2003. Since then he officiated numerous matches in the Oberliga, Regionalliga, and 3. Liga. He was then appointed to officiate in the 2. Bundesliga in the 2009–10 season, and also was a referee in the DFB-Pokal the following season. Ittrich also was an assistant referee in a few FIFA and UEFA matches.

In November 2011, Ittrich helped save the life of referee Babak Rafati with the help of Holger Henschel and Frank Willenborg, other members of the refereeing team. Before the Bundesliga match between 1. FC Köln and Mainz 05, they found Rafati had attempted to kill himself in his hotel room. Rafati was then rushed into intensive care.

In January 2016, he was promoted to officiate in the Bundesliga. He made his debut on 13 February 2016 in the match between VfL Wolfsburg and FC Ingolstadt.

Ittrich has suffered three ACL tears in his career: in 1999 and 2000 on the left, and on the right knee in 2012.

In March 2026, he announced his retirement at the end of the 2025–26 season.

== Personal life ==
Ittrich works as a police officer, and currently resides in Hamburg.
