= Maximilian Zimmer =

German footballer

Personal information
- Full name: Maximilian Zimmer
- Date of birth: 10 July 1992 (age 34)
- Place of birth: Berlin, Germany
- Height: 1.75 m (5 ft 9 in)
- Position: Midfielder

Youth career
- –2004: FSV Berolina Stralau
- 2004–2011: Hertha BSC

Senior career*
Years	Team	Apps	(Gls)
2011–2013	Hertha BSC II	15	(0)
2013–2015	SV Babelsberg 03	58	(12)
2015–2016	1. FC Kaiserslautern II	16	(1)
2016–2017	Berliner AK	49	(12)
2017–2019	Energie Cottbus	44	(11)

International career
2008	Germany U16	1	(0)
2008	Germany U17	3	(0)
2009	Germany U18	4	(0)
- * Club domestic league appearances and goals as of 13:46, 29 July 2019 (UTC)

Maximilian Zimmer (born 10 July 1992) is a retired German footballer who played as a midfielder.

== Retirement ==
On 5 September 2019, 27-year old Zimmer announced that he would retire, after suffering from his third cruciate ligament rupture in January 2019.
