= Fabio Viteritti =

German footballer (born 1993)

Personal information
- Date of birth: 22 May 1993 (age 33)
- Place of birth: Lörrach, Germany
- Height: 1.74 m (5 ft 9 in)
- Position: Midfielder

Youth career
- FC Friedlingen
- SV Weil
- –2010: Basel
- 2010–2011: 1. FC Magdeburg

Senior career*
Years	Team	Apps	(Gls)
2011–2014	1. FC Magdeburg	71	(4)
2011–2013	1. FC Magdeburg II	5	(3)
2015–2016	TSG Neustrelitz	41	(11)
2016–2019	Energie Cottbus	102	(30)
2019–2020	FSV Zwickau	30	(7)
2020–2022	Wacker Innsbruck	33	(5)
2022–2024	FC Black Stars Basel	55	(11)
- * Club domestic league appearances and goals as of 02:42, 4 July 2024 (UTC)

Fabio Viteritti (born 22 May 1993) is a German professional footballer who most recently played as a midfielder for Swiss club FC Black Stars Basel.

== Personal life ==
Viteritti was born in Lörrach, Baden-Württemberg and is of Italian descent.
