= Benjamin Brand =

German football referee (born 1989)

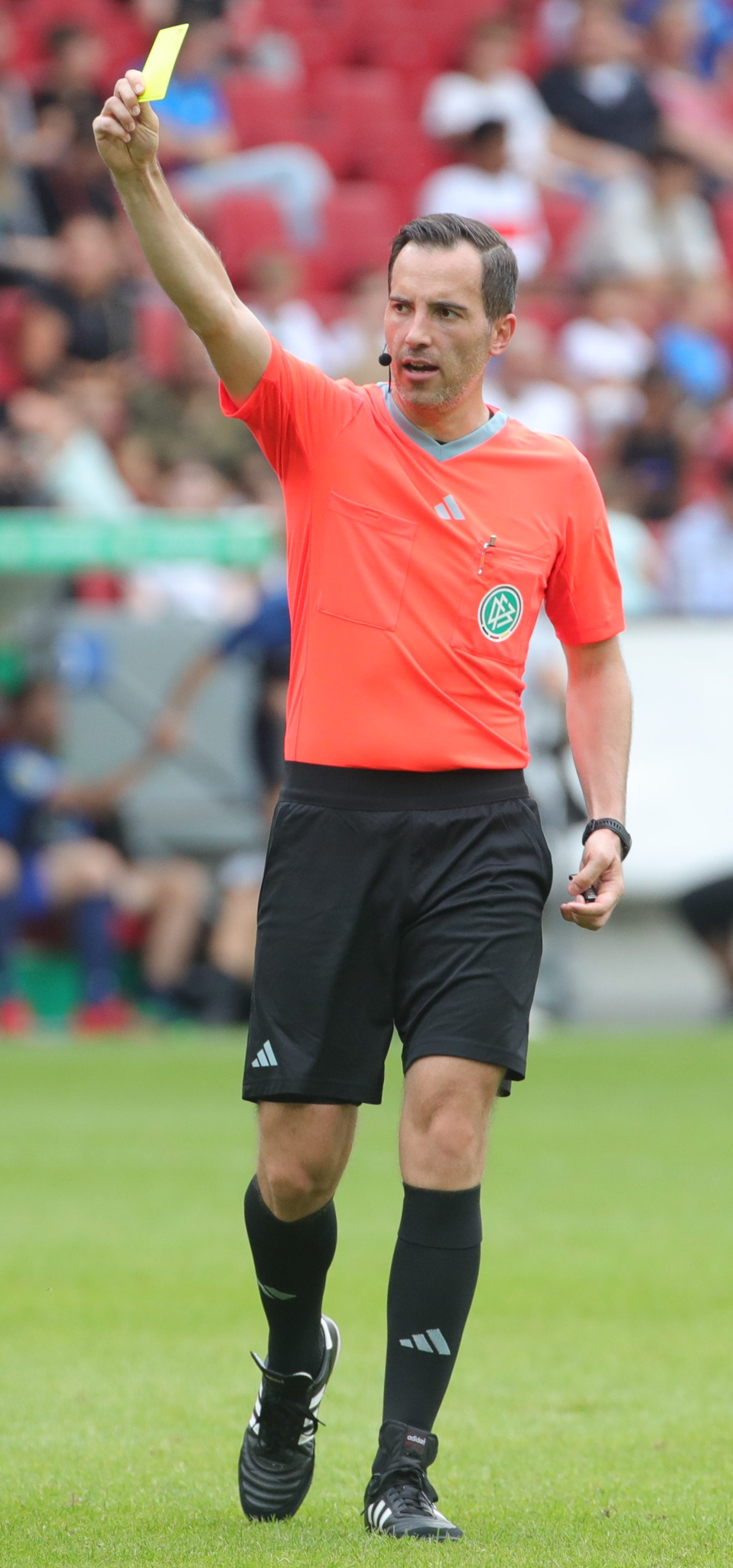
- Brand in 2023
- Born: 10 July 1989 (age 37)
- Other occupation: Studying business administration

Domestic
Years	League	Role
2004–	DFB	Referee
2010–	2. Bundesliga	Referee
2015–	Bundesliga	Referee

Benjamin Brand (born 10 July 1989) is a German football referee who is based in Bamberg. He referees for FC Schallfeld 1946 of the Bavarian Football Association.

== Refereeing career ==
Brand, referee of the club FC Schallfeld 1946, has officiated on the DFB level since 2010. In 2012, he was promoted to a 2. Bundesliga referee. In the summer of 2015, he was once again promoted, this time to the top level of German football, the Bundesliga, for the 2015–16 season. He takes the spots of retiring referees Peter Gagelmann and Thorsten Kinhöfer. He made his debut on 22 August 2015 in a match between Schalke 04 and Darmstadt 98.

== See also ==
- List of football referees
