= Sven Jablonski =

German football referee (born 1990)

- Sven Jablonski in 2024
- Born: 13 April 1990 (age 36)
- Other occupation: Bank teller

Domestic
Years	League	Role
2010–	DFB	Referee
2014–	2. Bundesliga	Referee
2017–	Bundesliga	Referee

Sven Jablonski (born 13 April 1990) is a German football referee who is based in Bremen. He referees for Blumenthaler SV of the Bremen Football Association.

== Refereeing career ==
Jablonski, referee of the club Blumenthaler SV, has officiated on the DFB level since 2010. He was promoted to officiate in the 3. Liga for the 2011–12 season, with his first match as referee between VfR Aalen and Wehen Wiesbaden on 13 August 2011. After three years, Jablonski was nominated as referee for the 2014–15 season of the 2. Bundesliga, refereeing his first match between FSV Frankfurt and RB Leipzig. In 2017, Jablonski was one of four referees promoted to officiate in the Bundesliga for the 2017–18 season.

== Personal life ==
Jablonski lives in Bremen, where he works as a bank teller.
