= Frank Willenborg =

German football referee (born 1979)

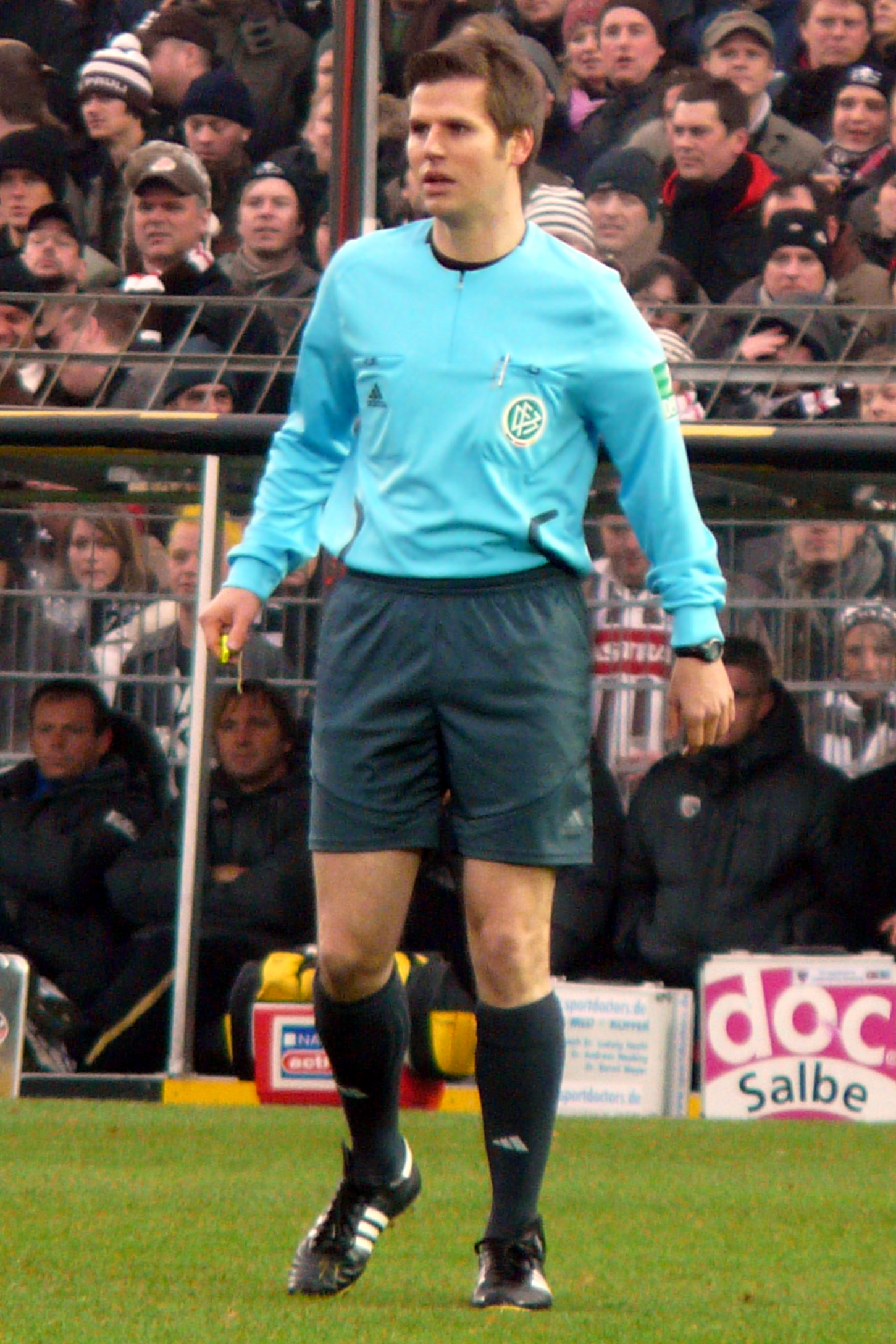
- Willenborg in 2008
- Born: 10 February 1979 (age 47)
- Other occupation: Realschule teacher

Domestic
Years	League	Role
2004–2026	DFB	Referee
2007–2026	2. Bundesliga	Referee
2016–2026	Bundesliga	Referee

Frank Willenborg (born 10 February 1979) is a German football referee who is based in Osnabrück. He referees for SV Gehlenberg of the Lower Saxony Football Association.

== Refereeing career ==
Willenborg, who referees for SV Gehlenberg, has been a DFB official since 2004. In 2007, he was appointed as a 2. Bundesliga referee. Willenborg also officiated the final of the Junior DFB-Pokal on 1 June 2013 between 1. FC Köln U-19 against 1. FC Kaiserslautern U-19. In the summer of 2016, Willenborg was one of four referees promoted to officiate in the Bundesliga.

In November 2011, he was one of the assistant referees that saved the life of fellow referee Babak Rafati from his suicide attempt, before the Bundesliga match between 1. FC Köln and Mainz 05.

== Personal life ==
Willenborg is a Realschule teacher at "Realschule Damme" and lives with his wife and two children in Osnabrück. He also temporarily worked at the secondary school "Hauptschule Dinklage" as a substitute teacher for German and sport.
