= 2023–24 ES Troyes AC season =

ES Troyes AC
2023–24 season
- Manager: Patrick Kisnorbo (until 26 November); Alou Diarra (caretaker, from 28 November to 5 December); David Guion (from 6 December)
- Stadium: Stade de l'Aube
- Ligue 2: 17th
- Coupe de France: Seventh round
- Top goalscorer: League: Rafiki Saïd (9); All: Rafiki Saïd (9)

The 2023–24 season was Espérance Sportive Troyes Aube Champagne's 38th season in existence and first one back in the Ligue 2 after being relegated from the Ligue 1. They are also competing in the Coupe de France.

== Players ==
=== First-team squad ===
As of 11 October 2023

Note: Flags indicate national team as defined under FIFA eligibility rules; some limited exceptions apply. Players may hold more than one non-FIFA nationality.

No.	Pos.	Nation	Player
1	GK	FRA	Corentin Michel
3	DF	SEN	Abdoulaye Ndiaye
5	DF	ALG	Mehdi Tahrat
8	DF	COM	Ismaël Boura
10	MF	COM	Youssouf M'Changama
11	FW	COM	Rafiki Saïd
12	DF	POR	Abdu Conté
15	MF	CRO	Ante Palaversa
16	GK	FRA	Nicolas Lemaître
17	FW	FRA	Nicolas de Préville
18	DF	FRA	Thierno Baldé
19	DF	DEN	Andreas Bruus
20	FW	FRA	Renaud Ripart
21	MF	SRB	Luka Ilić

No.	Pos.	Nation	Player
22	DF	FRA	Tanguy Zoukrou
23	FW	BEN	Junior Olaitan
24	MF	FRA	Xavier Chavalerin
26	FW	ALG	Noa Cervantes
27	FW	FRA	Kyliane Dong
28	MF	SEN	Mouhamed Diop
31	MF	CMR	Danel Dongmo
32	DF	FRA	Mathis Hamdi
34	FW	FRA	Alexis Lefebvre
37	DF	FRA	Eric N'Jo
38	GK	TUR	Doğan Alemdar (on loan from Rennes)
39	MF	FRA	Derek Mazou-Sacko
40	FW	MLI	Jaurès Assoumou
42	MF	CIV	Abdoulaye Raslan Kanté

=== On loan ===
Note: Flags indicate national team as defined under FIFA eligibility rules; some limited exceptions apply. Players may hold more than one non-FIFA nationality.

No.	Pos.	Nation	Player
—	DF	ECU	Jackson Porozo (on loan to Olympiacos)
—	DF	FRA	Yasser Larouci (on loan to Sheffield United)
—	MF	FRA	Ryan Fage (on loan to Avranches)
—	MF	COD	Metinho (on loan to Sparta Rotterdam)
—	FW	SWE	Amar Abdirahman Ahmed (on loan to Lommel)

No.	Pos.	Nation	Player
—	FW	GBS	Mama Baldé (on loan to Lyon)
—	FW	BRA	Sávio (on loan to Girona)
—	FW	FRA	Alexis Tibidi (on loan to NEC)
—	FW	CAN	Iké Ugbo (on loan to Cardiff City)

== Transfers ==
=== In ===
Pos.	Player	Transferred from	Fee	Date	Source
GK	(Turkey) Doğan Alemdar	(France) Rennes	Loan	5 July 2023	

=== Out ===
Pos.	Player	Transferred to	Fee	Date	Source
DF	(France) Adil Rami	Released		1 July 2023	
DF	(French Guiana) Yoann Salmier	(France) Le Havre	Free	4 July 2023	
FW	(Canada) Ike Ugbo	(Wales) Cardiff City	Loan	4 July 2023	
GK	(France) Gauthier Gallon	(France) Rennes	Undisclosed	5 July 2023	
MF	(Colombia) Marlos Moreno	(Turkey) Konyaspor	Undisclosed	8 July 2023	
FW	(Brazil) Sávio	(Spain) Girona	Loan	13 July 2023	
MF	(Brazil) Metinho	(Netherlands) Sparta Rotterdam	Loan	13 July 2023	

== Competitions ==
=== Overall record ===
Competition	First match	Last match	Starting round	Final position	Record							
Competition	First match	Last match	Starting round	Final position	Pld	W	D	L	GF	GA	GD	Win %
Ligue 2	5 August 2023	17 May 2024	Matchday 1	17th	38	9	14	15	42	50	−8	23.68
Coupe de France	18 November 2023		Seventh round	Seventh round	1	0	0	1	1	2	−1	0.00
Total					39	9	14	16	43	52	−9	23.08

Source: Soccerway

=== Ligue 2 ===
==== League table ====
Pos	Team	Pld	W	D	L	GF	GA	GD	Pts	Promotion or Relegation
15	Ajaccio	38	12	10	16	35	46	−11	46	
16	Dunkerque	38	12	10	16	36	52	−16	46	
17	Troyes	38	9	14	15	42	50	−8	41	Spared from relegation
18	Quevilly-Rouen (R)	38	7	17	14	51	55	−4	38	Relegation to National
19	Concarneau (R)	38	10	8	20	39	57	−18	38	Relegation to National

Updated to match(es) played on 17 May 2024. Source: Ligue 2
Rules for classification: 1) Points; 2) Goal difference; 3) Number of goals scored; 4) Head-to-head goal difference; 5) Fair play points
(R) Relegated

==== Results summary ====
Overall								Home						Away					
Pld	W	D	L	GF	GA	GD	Pts	W	D	L	GF	GA	GD	W	D	L	GF	GA	GD
37	9	14	14	42	49	−7	41	7	4	7	28	25	+3	2	10	7	14	24	−10

==== Results by round ====
Round	1	2	3	4	5	6	7	8	9	10	11	12	13	14	15	16	17	18	19	20	21	22	23	24	25	26	27	28	29	30	31	32	33	34	35	36	37	38
Ground	A	H	A	A	H	A	H	A	H	A	H	A	H	A	H	A	H	H	A	H	A	A	H	A	H	H	A	H	A	H	A	H	A	H	A	H	A	H
Result	D	W	D	L	D	D	L	L	L	D	D	D	W	L	L	W	W	L	D	W	L	D	W	L	W	L	D	W	D	L	L	L	L	D	D		W	
Position	8	5	6	10	10	13	15	16	16	16	17	17	16	17	17	17	14	15	16	14	16	15	15	16	15	16	16	14	15	16	17	17	17	17	17			

A = Away; H = Home; W = Win; D = Draw; L = Loss

==== Matches ====
The league fixtures were unveiled on 29 June 2023.

5 August 2023 1	Dunkerque	2–2	Troyes	Dunkirk
19:00				Stadium: Stade Marcel-Tribut; Referee: Rémi Landry

12 August 2023 2	Troyes	2–1	Laval	Troyes
19:00		Report		Stadium: Stade de l'Aube

19 August 2023 3	Grenoble	0–0	Troyes	Grenoble
19:00		Report		Stadium: Stade des Alpes

26 August 2023 4	Bastia	3–2	Troyes	Furiani
19:00		Report		Stadium: Stade Armand-Cesari

2 September 2023 5	Troyes	2–2	Quevilly-Rouen	Troyes
19:00		Report		Stadium: Stade de l'Aube

16 September 2023 6	Annecy	0–0	Troyes	Annecy
19:00		Report		Stadium: Parc des Sports

23 September 2023 7	Troyes	1–2	Auxerre	Troyes
15:00		Report		Stadium: Stade de l'Aube

26 September 2023 8	Rodez	2–1	Troyes	Rodez
20:45		Report		Stadium: Stade Paul-Lignon

4 November 2023 13	Troyes	2–1	Caen	Troyes
19:00				Stadium: Stade de l'Aube

11 November 2023 14	Ajaccio	1–0	Troyes	Ajaccio
19:00				Stadium: Stade François Coty

25 November 2023 15	Troyes	0–1	Guingamp	Troyes
19:00				Stadium: Stade de l'Aube

2 December 2023 16	Bordeaux	0–1	Troyes	Bordeaux
15:00				Stadium: Matmut Atlantique

5 December 2023 17	Troyes	2–0	Amiens	Troyes
20:45		Report		Stadium: Stade de l'Aube; Referee: Ahmed Taleb

12 February 2024 24	Saint-Étienne	5–0	Troyes	Saint-Étienne

2 March 2024 27	Guingamp	0–0	Troyes	Guingamp

9 March 2024 28	Troyes	2–0	Bastia	Troyes
19:00				Stadium: Stade de l'Aube

16 March 2024 29	Quevilly-Rouen	1–1	Troyes	Le Petit-Quevilly

30 March 2024 30	Troyes	2–3	Rodez	Troyes
19:00				Stadium: Stade de l'Aube

8 April 2024 31	Auxerre	2–0	Troyes	Auxerre

13 April 2024 32	Troyes	1–2	Paris FC	Troyes
19:00				Stadium: Stade de l'Aube

20 April 2024 33	Angers	2–1	Troyes	Angers
19:00

23 April 2024 34	Troyes	2–2	Pau	Troyes
20:45				Stadium: Stade de l'Aube

27 April 2024 35	Amiens	0–0	Troyes	Amiens
19:00

3 May 2024 36	Troyes	Abandoned	Valenciennes	Troyes
20:00				Stadium: Stade de l'Aube

10 May 2024 37	Laval	1–2	Troyes	Laval
20:45				Stadium: Stade Francis Le Basser

17 May 2024 38	Troyes	v	Annecy	Troyes
20:45				Stadium: Stade de l'Aube

=== Coupe de France ===
18 November 2023 Seventh round	SAS Épinal	2–1	Troyes	Épinal
13:45		Report		Stadium: Stade de la Colombière; Referee: Antoine Valnet
