= 2022–23 ES Troyes AC season =

ES Troyes AC
2022–23 season
- Owner: City Football Group
- President: Daniel Masoni
- Head coach: Bruno Irles (until 8 November); Patrick Kisnorbo (from 23 November)
- Stadium: Stade de l'Aube
- Ligue 1: 19th (relegated)
- Coupe de France: Round of 64
- Top goalscorer: League: Mama Baldé (12); All: Mama Baldé (12)
Home colours	Away colours

The 2022–23 season was the 37th season in the history of ES Troyes AC and their second consecutive season in the top flight. The club participated in Ligue 1 and the Coupe de France. The season covers the period from 1 July 2022 to 30 June 2023.

== Players ==
As of 14 February 2023.

Note: Flags indicate national team as defined under FIFA eligibility rules; some limited exceptions apply. Players may hold more than one non-FIFA nationality.

No.	Pos.	Nation	Player
1	GK	POL	Mateusz Lis (on loan from Southampton)
2	DF	ECU	Jackson Porozo
3	DF	FRA	Thierno Baldé
4	DF	USA	Erik Palmer-Brown
6	MF	MLI	Rominigue Kouamé
7	FW	GBS	Mama Baldé
8	MF	FRA	Lucien Agoumé (on loan from Inter Milan)
9	FW	CAN	Iké Ugbo
10	MF	FRA	Florian Tardieu (vice-captain)
11	MF	POR	Rony Lopes (on loan from Sevilla)
12	DF	POR	Abdu Conté
14	MF	FRA	Jeff Reine-Adélaïde (on loan from Lyon)
15	MF	CRO	Ante Palaversa
17	DF	GUF	Yoann Salmier
19	DF	DEN	Andreas Bruus
20	MF	FRA	Renaud Ripart

No.	Pos.	Nation	Player
22	DF	FRA	Tanguy Zoukrou
23	DF	FRA	Adil Rami (captain)
24	MF	FRA	Xavier Chavalerin
25	FW	FRA	Alexis Tibidi
26	FW	MTN	Pape Ndiaga Yade (on loan from Metz)
27	FW	FRA	Kyliane Dong
28	MF	FRA	Derek Mazou-Sacko
29	MF	FRA	Wilson Odobert
30	GK	FRA	Gauthier Gallon
31	MF	CMR	Danel Dongmo
32	DF	FRA	Mathis Hamdi
36	MF	FRA	Ryan Fage
37	DF	FRA	Eric N'Jo
39	DF	FRA	Yasser Larouci
40	GK	FRA	Jessy Moulin
44	FW	ENG	Levi Lumeka

=== On loan ===
Note: Flags indicate national team as defined under FIFA eligibility rules; some limited exceptions apply. Players may hold more than one non-FIFA nationality.

No.	Pos.	Nation	Player
—	MF	SLO	Enrik Ostrc (to Lommel until 30 June 2023)
—	MF	BRA	Metinho (to Lommel until 30 June 2023)
—	MF	SRB	Luka Ilić (to TSC Bačka Topola until 30 June 2023)
—	FW	SWE	Amar Abdirahman Ahmed (to Lommel until 30 June 2023)

No.	Pos.	Nation	Player
—	FW	UKR	Mykola Kukharevych (to Hibernian until 31 May 2023)
—	FW	FRA	Alexis Lefebvre (to Nancy until 30 June 2023)
—	FW	BRA	Sávio (to PSV Eindhoven until 30 June 2023)
—	FW	COL	Marlos Moreno (to Konyaspor until 30 June 2023)

== Pre-season and friendlies ==
Win Draw Loss Fixtures

9 July 2022 Friendly	Toulouse (France)	6–1	(France) Troyes	Tulle
18:00 CEST (UTC+2)	Ratão 3'; Begraoui 36'; Dejaegere 45+1'; Chaïbi 49'; Mazou-Sacko 51' (o.g.); Sidibé 90'		Ilić 44' (pen.)	Stadium: Stade Alexandre Cueille; Attendance: 1,000; Referee: Jérémy Stinat

16 July 2022 Friendly	Metz (France)	4–0	(France) Troyes	Homécourt
17:00 CEST (UTC+2)	Candé 39'; Jallow 72'; Gueye 74'; N'Diaye 83'			Stadium: Stade Yvan Tepus

20 July 2022 Friendly	Troyes (France)	3–0	(France) Le Havre	Poissy
17:30 CEST (UTC+2)	Salmier 29'; Ilić 70' (pen.); Lefebvre 88'			Stadium: Stade Léo Lagrange

23 July 2022 Friendly	Auxerre (France)	1–0	(France) Troyes	Auxerre
19:00 CEST (UTC+2)	Hein 75'			Stadium: Stade de l'Abbé Deschamps

30 July 2022 Friendly	Troyes (France)	5–4	(France) Nancy	Troyes
17:30 CEST (UTC+2)	Dong 42', 43'; Porozo 54'; Odobert 80'; Chavalerin 81'		Nangis 17' (pen.); Cissé 30'; El Aynaoui 40'; Mouazan 86' (pen.)	Stadium: Stade de l'Aube

21 December 2022 Friendly	Paris FC (France)	1–0	(France) Troyes	Orly
15:00 CET (UTC+1)				Stadium: Centre d’entrainement Paris FC

== Competitions ==
=== Overall record ===
Competition	First match	Last match	Starting round	Final position	Record							
Competition	First match	Last match	Starting round	Final position	Pld	W	D	L	GF	GA	GD	Win %
Ligue 1	7 August 2022	3 June 2023	Matchday 1	19th	38	4	12	22	45	81	−36	10.53
Coupe de France	8 January 2023		Round of 64	Round of 64	1	0	0	1	0	2	−2	0.00
Total					39	4	12	23	45	83	−38	10.26

Source: Soccerway

=== Ligue 1 ===
==== League table ====
Pos	Team	Pld	W	D	L	GF	GA	GD	Pts	Qualification or relegation
16	Nantes	38	7	15	16	37	55	−18	36	
17	Auxerre (R)	38	8	11	19	35	63	−28	35	Relegation to Ligue 2
18	Ajaccio (R)	38	7	5	26	23	74	−51	26	Relegation to Ligue 2
19	Troyes (R)	38	4	12	22	45	81	−36	24	Relegation to Ligue 2
20	Angers (R)	38	4	6	28	33	81	−48	18	Relegation to Ligue 2

Source: Ligue 1
Rules for classification: 1) Points; 2) Goal difference; 3) Head-to-head points; 4) Head-to-head goal difference; 5) Head-to-head goals scored; 6) Head-to-head away goals scored; 7) Goals scored; 8) Away goals scored; 9) Fair-play points (Note: Head-to-head record is used only after all the matches between the teams in question have been played).
(R) Relegated

==== Results summary ====
Overall								Home						Away					
Pld	W	D	L	GF	GA	GD	Pts	W	D	L	GF	GA	GD	W	D	L	GF	GA	GD
38	4	12	22	45	81	−36	24	1	11	7	19	30	−11	3	1	15	26	51	−25

Source: Ligue 1

==== Results by round ====
Round	1	2	3	4	5	6	7	8	9	10	11	12	13	14	15	16	17	18	19	20	21	22	23	24	25	26	27	28	29	30	31	32	33	34	35	36	37	38
Ground	A	H	A	H	A	H	A	A	H	A	H	H	A	H	A	H	A	H	A	H	A	H	A	H	A	H	A	H	A	H	A	A	H	H	A	H	A	H
Result	L	L	L	W	W	D	L	W	D	L	D	D	L	D	L	D	W	L	L	D	L	L	L	L	L	D	L	D	L	L	L	D	L	L	L	D	L	D
Position	13	19	20	15	11	11	13	10	11	12	12	11	12	13	13	14	13	13	14	15	16	16	16	17	19	19	19	18	18	18	19	19	19	19	19	18	18	19

Source: Ligue 1
A = Away; H = Home; W = Win; D = Draw; L = Loss

==== Matches ====
The league fixtures were announced on 17 June 2022.

7 August 2022 1	Montpellier	3–2	Troyes	Montpellier
15:00 CEST (UTC+2)	Sainte-Luce 3'; Savanier 15', 81'; Makouana (yellow card) 52'	Report	Tardieu 12' (pen.); M. Baldé 17'	Stadium: Stade de la Mosson; Attendance: 12,003; Referee: Pierre Gaillouste

14 August 2022 2	Troyes	0–3	Toulouse	Troyes
15:00 CEST (UTC+2)	Kouamé (yellow card) 42'; Tardieu (yellow card) 74'	Report	Dallinga (yellow card) 30'; Larouci 36' (o.g.); Ratão 54'; Healey 85'	Stadium: Stade de l'Aube; Attendance: 7,630; Referee: Marc Bollengier

19 August 2022 3	Lyon	4–1	Troyes	Décines-Charpieu
21:00 CEST (UTC+2)	Lacazette 3'; Tagliafico 47'; Tetê 49', 76'	Report	Tardieu 39' (pen.); Kouamé (yellow card) 52'	Stadium: Parc Olympique Lyonnais; Attendance: 43,000; Referee: Eric Wattellier

28 August 2022 4	Troyes	3–1	Angers	Troyes
15:00 CEST (UTC+2)	Ripart 11'; Salmier (yellow card) 30'; Rami (yellow card) 44'; M. Baldé 60'; Odobert 81'	Report	Mendy (yellow card) 10' (yellow-red card) 20'; Diony 66'; Taïbi (yellow card) 70'	Stadium: Stade de l'Aube; Attendance: 6,673; Referee: Stéphanie Frappart

31 August 2022 5	Monaco	2–4	Troyes	Monaco
19:00 CEST (UTC+2)	Maripán 10', (yellow card) 21' (yellow-red card) 44'; Aguilar (yellow card) 48'; Fofana 63'	Report	Tardieu 22' (pen.); Odobert 45+3'; M. Baldé 48'; Palmer-Brown (yellow card) 58'; Salmier 78'	Stadium: Stade Louis II; Attendance: 4,045; Referee: Ruddy Buquet

4 September 2022 6	Troyes	1–1	Rennes	Troyes
17:05 CEST (UTC+2)	Ugbo 14'; Salmier (red card) 27'; Chavalerin (yellow card) 72'; Gallon (yellow card) 90+1'	Report	Santamaria (yellow card) 42', (goal) 48'; Meling (yellow card) 71'	Stadium: Stade de l'Aube; Attendance: 8,000; Referee: Mathieu Vernice

9 September 2022 7	Lens	1–0	Troyes	Lens
21:00 CEST (UTC+2)	Danso 39'; Poręba (yellow card) 41'; Cabot (yellow card) 77'	Report	Tardieu (yellow card) 77'	Stadium: Stade Bollaert-Delelis; Attendance: 37,344; Referee: Hakim Ben El Hadj

18 September 2022 8	Clermont	1–3	Troyes	Clermont-Ferrand
15:00 CEST (UTC+2)	Gastien 3'	Report	M. Baldé 23', 54'; Bruus (yellow card) 46'; Agoumé (yellow card) 51'; Yade (yellow card) 53'; Ripart 83'	Stadium: Stade Gabriel Montpied; Attendance: 10,753; Referee: Jérôme Brisard

2 October 2022 9	Troyes	2–2	Reims	Troyes
15:00 CEST (UTC+2)	Salmier (yellow card) 19'; Odobert 51'; Gallon (yellow card) 57'; Bruus (yellow card) 83'; Porozo 90'; Palmer-Brown (yellow card) 90+6'	Report	Balogun 12'; Ito 54', (red card) 56'; Diakité (yellow card) 90+4'; Agbadou (yellow card) 90+6'	Stadium: Stade de l'Aube; Attendance: 10,164; Referee: Benoît Millot

9 October 2022 10	Nice	3–2	Troyes	Nice
15:00 CEST (UTC+2)	Viti 2'; Delort 37' (pen.); Pépé 50'; Bryan (yellow card) 56'	Report	Chavalerin 82'; Conté 90'; M. Baldé (yellow card) 90+3'	Stadium: Allianz Riviera; Attendance: 18,053; Referee: Johan Hamel

16 October 2022 11	Troyes	1–1	Ajaccio	Troyes
15:00 CEST (UTC+2)	M. Baldé (yellow card) 18'; Ripart (yellow card) 53'; Porozo 76'	Report	Koné (yellow card) 16'; Nouri (penalty missed) 37'; El Idrissy 88'	Stadium: Stade de l'Aube; Attendance: 7,731; Referee: Jérôme Brisard

23 October 2022 12	Troyes	2–2	Lorient	Troyes
15:00 CEST (UTC+2)	Porozo (yellow card) 27'; Laporte 34' (o.g.); Lopes 61'; Lis (yellow card) 65'	Report	Diarra 50'; Boisgard 81'	Stadium: Stade de l'Aube; Attendance: 7,975; Referee: Marc Bollengier

29 October 2022 13	Paris Saint-Germain	4–3	Troyes	Paris
17:00 CEST (UTC+2)	Soler 24'; Messi 55'; Neymar 62'; Mbappé 77' (pen.)	Report	M. Baldé 3', 52'; Porozo (yellow card) 59'; Gallon (yellow card) 75'; Lopes (yellow card) 78'; Palaversa 88'	Stadium: Parc des Princes; Attendance: 46,359; Referee: Eric Wattellier

4 November 2022 14	Troyes	1–1	Auxerre	Troyes
21:00 CEST (UTC+2)	Salmier (yellow card) 17'; Lopes 72'; Ripart (yellow card) 72'	Report	Perrin 86'	Stadium: Stade de l'Aube; Attendance: 12,689; Referee: Pierre Gaillouste

13 November 2022 15	Brest	2–1	Troyes	Brest
15:00 CET (UTC+1)	Del Castillo 55' (pen.); Mounié 77' (pen.); Hérelle (yellow card) 80'; Chardonnet (yellow card) 86'; Bizot (yellow card) 89'	Report	Kouamé (yellow card) 34'; Lopes (yellow card) 36'; Chardonnet 60' (o.g.); M. Baldé (red card) 80'	Stadium: Stade Francis-Le Blé; Attendance: 10,642; Referee: Ruddy Buquet

28 December 2022 16	Troyes	0–0	Nantes	Troyes
21:00 CEST (UTC+2)		Report	Castelletto (yellow card) 15'; Centonze (yellow card) 79'	Stadium: Stade de l'Aube; Attendance: 9,043; Referee: Stéphanie Frappart

2 January 2023 17	Strasbourg	2–3	Troyes	Strasbourg
17:05 CET (UTC+1)	Diallo 41'; Doukouré 54', (yellow card) 60'	Report	Ripart 16'; Lopes 20'; Larouci (yellow card) 61'; Conté (yellow card) 70'; T. Baldé (yellow card) 70'; Chavalerin 78'	Stadium: Stade de la Meinau; Attendance: 25,135; Referee: Benoît Millot

11 January 2023 18	Troyes	0–2	Marseille	Troyes
21:00 CET (UTC+1)	Kouamé (yellow card) 48'; Ripart (yellow card) 73'	Report	Mbemba 10', (yellow card) 54'; Kaboré (yellow card) 14'; Veretout 46'; Malinovskyi (yellow card) 67'	Stadium: Stade de l'Aube; Attendance: 14,222; Referee: Hakim Ben El Hadj

15 January 2023 19	Lille	5–1	Troyes	Villeneuve-d'Ascq
13:00 CET (UTC+1)	Bayo 16', 47'; Baleba (yellow card) 23'; David 45+2', 88'; Virginius 75'	Report	M. Baldé 65'	Stadium: Stade Pierre-Mauroy; Attendance: 31,254; Referee: Pierre Gaillouste

28 January 2023 20	Troyes	1–1	Lens	Troyes
17:00 CET (UTC+1)	M. Baldé (yellow card) 24'; Larouci 50'; Chavalerin (yellow card) 86'	Report	Danso (yellow card) 9'; Thomasson 88'	Stadium: Stade de l'Aube; Attendance: 13,500; Referee: Clément Turpin

1 February 2023 21	Toulouse	4–1	Troyes	Toulouse
19:00 CET (UTC+1)	Dupé (yellow card) 9'; Dallinga 15'; Rouault (yellow card) 26'; Chaïbi 35'; Van den Boomen 54' (pen.); Onaiwu 87'	Report	M. Baldé 11' (pen.), 51'; Agoumé (yellow card) 41'; Salmier (yellow card) 44'; Porozo (yellow card) 73'	Stadium: Stadium de Toulouse; Attendance: 17,725; Referee: Mathieu Vernice

4 February 2023 22	Troyes	1–3	Lyon	Troyes
19:00 CET (UTC+1)	Lopes 62'	Report	Tagliafico (yellow card) 25'; Barcola 43'; Cherki 59'; Lacazette 90+3'	Stadium: Stade de l'Aube; Attendance: 10,240; Referee: François Letexier

12 February 2023 23	Reims	4–0	Troyes	Reims
15:00 CET (UTC+1)	Munetsi 9'; Flips (yellow card) 40'; Maolida 43'; Balogun 49'; Cajuste 81'	Report	Palmer-Brown (yellow card) 42'; Agoumé (yellow card) 56'	Stadium: Stade Auguste Delaune; Attendance: 8,115; Referee: Jérémie Pignard

19 February 2023 24	Troyes	0–1	Montpellier	Troyes
15:00 CET (UTC+1)	Agoumé (yellow card) 8'; Yade (red card) 67'; Chavalerin (yellow card) 81'	Report	Chotard (yellow card) 57'; Savanier (red card) 73'; Khazri 90'	Stadium: Stade de l'Aube; Attendance: 7,745; Referee: Benoît Bastien

26 February 2023 25	Ajaccio	2–1	Troyes	Ajaccio
15:00 CET (UTC+1)	Vidal (yellow card) 51'; Belaïli 62' (pen.); El Idrissy 68'; Marchetti (yellow card) 76'	Report	M. Baldé 23', (yellow card) 71' (yellow-red card) 76'	Stadium: Stade François Coty; Attendance: 5,983; Referee: Marc Bollengier

5 March 2023 26	Troyes	2–2	Monaco	Troyes
13:00 CET (UTC+1)	Kouamé 31'; Igbo 90+1'	Report	Golovin (yellow card) 37'; Ben Yedder 80', 83'	Stadium: Stade de l'Aube; Attendance: 9,160; Referee: Stéphanie Frappart

12 March 2023 27	Lorient	2–0	Troyes	Lorient
15:00 CET (UTC+1)	Dieng 8'; Diarra 90+2'	Report	Palmer-Brown (yellow card) 76'; Kouamé (yellow card) 79'	Stadium: Stade du Moustoir; Attendance: 6,889; Referee: Clément Turpin

19 March 2023 28	Troyes	2–2	Brest	Troyes
15:00 CET (UTC+1)	Ripart 34', (yellow card) 45+1'; Lopes 38'	Report	Lees-Melou 30'; Del Castillo 74'	Stadium: Stade de l'Aube; Attendance: 9,012; Referee: Florent Batta

2 April 2023 29	Auxerre	1–0	Troyes	Auxerre
17:00 CEST (UTC+2)	Niang 73'	Report		Stadium: Stade de l'Abbé-Deschamps; Attendance: 16,512; Referee: Jérôme Brisard

9 April 2023 30	Troyes	0–2	Clermont	Troyes
15:00 CEST (UTC+2)	Kouamé (yellow card) 19'; Salmier (yellow card) 38'; Rami (yellow card) 90+3'	Report	Cham 26'; Gastien 29'; Magnin (yellow card) 81'; Seid (yellow card) 85'	Stadium: Stade de l'Aube; Attendance: 7,777; Referee: Jérémy Stinat

16 April 2023 31	Marseille	3–1	Troyes	Marseille
20:45 CEST (UTC+2)	Vitinha 1', 63'; Ünder 39'; Malinovskyi (yellow card) 83'; Balerdi (yellow card) 86'	Report	Agoumé (yellow card) 54'; Kouamé (yellow card) 59'; M. Baldé 90'	Stadium: Stade Vélodrome; Attendance: 63,486; Referee: Benoît Millot

23 April 2023 32	Nantes	2–2	Troyes	Nantes
15:00 CEST (UTC+2)	Pallois 25'; Centonze (yellow card) 90+1'; Guessand 90+6'	Report	M. Baldé 64' (pen.); Odobert 90+2'; Agoumé (yellow card) 90+9'	Stadium: Stade de la Beaujoire; Attendance: 34,082; Referee: Jérémie Pignard

30 April 2023 33	Troyes	0–1	Nice	Troyes
15:00 CEST (UTC+2)		Report	Boudaoui 1'; Moffi (yellow card) 50'; Ramsey (yellow card) 63'	Stadium: Stade de l'Aube; Attendance: 8,399; Referee: Eric Wattelier

7 May 2023 34	Troyes	1–3	Paris Saint-Germain	Troyes
20:45 CEST (UTC+2)	M. Baldé (yellow card) 45+2'; Chavalerin 83'	Report	Mbappé 8'; Vitinha 59'; Fabián 86'	Stadium: Stade de l'Aube; Attendance: 18,890; Referee: Ruddy Buquet

14 May 2023 35	Rennes	4–0	Troyes	Rennes
15:00 CEST (UTC+2)	Theate 14'; Bourigeaud 65'; Toko Ekambi 70', 74'	Report	Kouamé (yellow card) 32'	Stadium: Roazhon Park; Attendance: 27,836; Referee: Stéphanie Frappart

21 May 2023 36	Troyes	1–1	Strasbourg	Troyes
15:00 CEST (UTC+2)	Palmer-Brown (yellow card) 22'; Gallon (red card) 58'; Lopes 73'	Report	Diarra 27'; Perrin (yellow card) 55'; Djiku (red card) 72'	Stadium: Stade de l'Aube; Attendance: 9,834; Referee: Clément Turpin

27 May 2023 37	Angers	2–1	Troyes	Angers
21:00 CEST (UTC+2)	Abdelli 38'; Niane (yellow card) 67'; Rao-Lisoa 90'	Report	Chavalerin 13'; Kouamé (yellow card) 78'	Stadium: Stade Raymond Kopa; Attendance: 7,419; Referee: Karim Abed

3 June 2023 38	Troyes	1–1	Lille	Troyes
21:00 CEST (UTC+2)	Lopes 72'	Report	André (yellow card) 15'; Gudmundsson (yellow card) 26'; Ang. Gomes (yellow card) 32'; Diakité 52'; Ounas (yellow card) 55'	Stadium: Stade de l'Aube; Attendance: 11,006; Referee: Jérémy Stinat

=== Coupe de France ===
8 January 2023 Round of 64	Lille	2–0	Troyes	Villeneuve-d'Ascq
20:45 CET (UTC+1)	David 15'; Bayo 68'	Report	Mazou-Sacko (yellow card) 21'; M. Baldé (yellow card) 32'; Dongmo (yellow card) 70'	Stadium: Stade Pierre-Mauroy; Attendance: 13,185; Referee: Jérôme Brisard
