= Luka Ilić =

Serbian footballer

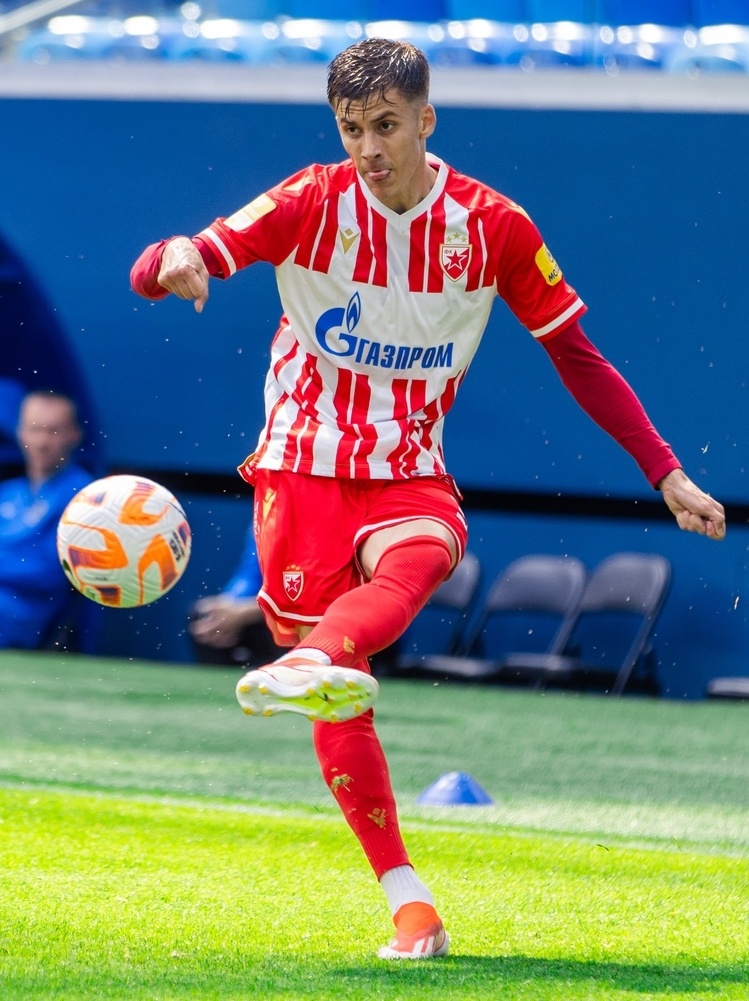
- Ilić in 2024

Personal information
- Full name: Luka Ilić
- Date of birth: 2 July 1999 (age 27)
- Place of birth: Niš, FR Yugoslavia
- Height: 1.85 m (6 ft 1 in)
- Position: Attacking midfielder

Youth career
- 2006–2008: Filip Filipović
- 2008–2014: Real Niš
- 2014–2017: Red Star Belgrade

Senior career*
Years	Team	Apps	(Gls)
2016–2017	Red Star Belgrade	0	(0)
2017–2022	Manchester City	0	(0)
2017–2018	→ Red Star Belgrade (loan)	14	(2)
2018–2020	→ NAC (loan)	41	(7)
2020–2021	→ Twente (loan)	29	(2)
2022–2024	Troyes	19	(5)
2022–2023	→ TSC (loan)	25	(6)
2024–2025	Red Star Belgrade	34	(12)
2025–2026	Oviedo	19	(1)

International career^{‡}
2016	Serbia U17	5	(1)
2015–2016	Serbia U18	1	(0)
2017–2018	Serbia U19	5	(1)
2017–2020	Serbia U21	12	(3)
2023–	Serbia	1	(1)
- * Club domestic league appearances and goals as of 26 May 2026 ‡ National team caps and goals as of 26 January 2023

Luka Ilić (Serbian Cyrillic: Лука Илић; born 2 July 1999) is a Serbian professional footballer who plays as an attacking midfielder for the Serbia national team.

== Club career ==
=== Red Star Belgrade ===
Ilić started playing football with local football club Filip Filipović at the age of seven, along with his younger brother Ivan. Ilić later played with football club Real Niš until 2014, after which he joined Red Star Belgrade. He joined the first team in for the 2016–17 season under coach Miodrag Božović, making his senior debut for the team in a friendly match against Ludogorets Razgrad on 14 November 2015.

Ilić signed his professional contract with Red Star Belgrade in February 2016. During the 2017 summer pre-season, Ilić presented as one of the top ten club's youth prospects. He made his official debut for the club on 6 July 2017, replacing Slavoljub Srnić in second leg of the first qualifying round for 2017–18 UEFA Europa League against Floriana. Several days later, Red Star Belgrade accepted an offer from the English club Manchester City and Ilić had been sold for a €5 million net fee along with his younger brother, Ivan.

Within the arrangement, Ilić returned to Red Star Belgrade on a one-year loan. He made his Serbian SuperLiga debut on 13 August 2017, replacing Nemanja Milić in the match against OFK Bačka. Ilić scored his first senior goal in 4–0 victory against Mačva Šabac on 14 October 2017.

=== Playing in the Netherlands ===
Ilić signed for Dutch club NAC Breda on loan for the 2018–19 season. On 3 August 2019, it was announced that he would spend another year on loan at NAC despite their relegation.

Ilić was announced as a FC Twente loan signing on transfer deadline day for the 2020–21 season. On 8 July 2021, it was announced he would spend another year on loan at the club. After making only five appearances, it was announced that he would not continue playing with the club after the winter break, cutting his loan spell short and returning to his parent club.

=== Troyes and Oviedo ===
In January 2022, Ilić made a permanent transfer to French club Troyes with contract until summer 2024. On 18 July 2025, after one year back in Red Star Belgrade, he joined Spanish La Liga club Real Oviedo on a three-year contract.

== Style of play ==
As a left-footed player, Ilić performed at all position in midfield through the youth career. In early years of playing football, he usually performed more offensive as a second striker or attacking midfielder. Joining the youth team of Red Star Belgrade, he converted his position – playing as right-side central midfielder, and later as a defensive midfielder with a box-to-box role – being paired with his brother. Ilić is characterized by lucidity and great performances face to face game against the opponent. Ilić is also free-kick taker.

== Personal life ==
Born in Niš, Ilić grew up in a sports family. His father, Srđan, played as a winger in Radnički Niš. His mother, Danijela Ilić, played basketball at professional level. Ilić's younger brother, Ivan is also a professional footballer.

== International career ==
On 25 January 2023, Ilić debuted for the Serbia in a 2–1 friendly victory against United States, in which he also scored his first international goal.

== Career statistics ==
=== Club ===
As of match played 2 February 2026

Appearances and goals by club, season and competition
Club	Season	League			National cup (Note: Includes Serbian Cup, KNVB Cup, Coupe de France)		Europe		Total	
Club	Season	Division	Apps	Goals	Apps	Goals	Apps	Goals	Apps	Goals
Red Star Belgrade	2016–17	Serbian SuperLiga	0	0	0	0	—		0	0
Red Star Belgrade (loan)	2017–18	Serbian SuperLiga	14	2	2	0	1 (Note: Ilić made an appearance against Floriana before rejoined the club as a loaned player)	0	17	2
NAC Breda (loan)	2018–19	Eredivisie	16	2	1	0	—		17	2
NAC Breda (loan)	2019–20	Eerste Divisie	25	5	3	0	—		28	5
NAC Breda (loan)	Total		41	7	4	0	—		45	7
FC Twente (loan)	2020–21	Eredivisie	24	2	0	0	—		24	2
FC Twente (loan)	2021–22	Eredivisie	5	0	0	0	—		5	0
FC Twente (loan)	Total		29	2	0	0	—		29	2
Troyes	2021–22	Ligue 1	0	0	0	0	—		0	0
Troyes	2022–23	Ligue 1	0	0	0	0	—		0	0
Troyes	2023–24	Ligue 2	19	5	1	0	—		20	5
Troyes	Total		19	5	1	0	—		20	5
TSC (loan)	2022–23	Serbian SuperLiga	25	6	4	2	—		29	8
Red Star Belgrade	2024–25	Serbian SuperLiga	34	12	4	2	7 (Note: Appearances in UEFA Champions League)	0	45	14
Real Oviedo	2025–26	La Liga	14	1	0	0	—		14	1
Career total			176	35	15	4	8	0	198	39

=== International ===
As of January 26, 2023

Appearances and goals by national team and year
National team	Year	Apps	Goals
Serbia	2023	1	1
Total		1	1

Scores and results list the Serbia's goal tally first, score column indicates score after each Ilić's goal.

List of international goals scored by Luka Ilić
No.	Date	Venue	Cap	Opponent	Score	Result	Competition
1	January 25, 2023	BMO Stadium, Los Angeles, United States	1	United States	1–1	2–1	Friendly

== Honours ==
Red Star Belgrade

- Serbian SuperLiga: 2017–18, 2024–25
- Serbian Cup: 2024–25

Individual

- Serbian SuperLiga Team of the Season: 2022–23
- Serbian SuperLiga Player of the Week: 2024–25 (Round 12), (Round 18)
