= Ivan Ilić (footballer, born 2001) =

Serbian footballer

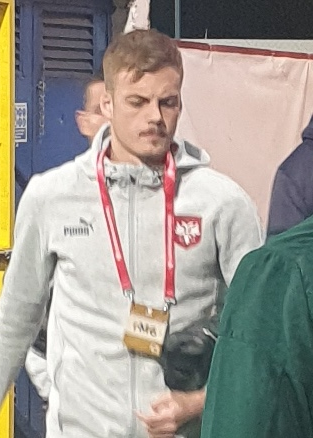
- Ilić with Serbia in 2023

Personal information
- Full name: Ivan Ilić
- Date of birth: 17 March 2001 (age 25)
- Place of birth: Niš, FR Yugoslavia
- Height: 1.86 m (6 ft 1 in)
- Position: Defensive midfielder

Team information
- Current team: Lecce (on loan from Torino)
- Number: 20

Youth career
- Filip Filipović
- 2008–2016: Real Niš
- 2016–2017: Red Star Belgrade

Senior career*
Years	Team	Apps	(Gls)
2017	Red Star Belgrade	1	(0)
2017–2020	Manchester City	0	(0)
2019	→ Zemun (loan)	16	(3)
2019–2020	→ NAC Breda (loan)	21	(3)
2020–2023	Hellas Verona	72	(3)
2023–	Torino	72	(6)
2026–	→ Lecce (loan)	5	(0)

International career^{‡}
2016−2018	Serbia U17	15	(1)
2019–2022	Serbia U21	12	(1)
2021–	Serbia	24	(0)
- * Club domestic league appearances and goals as of 18 October 2026 ‡ National team caps and goals as of 13 November 2025

Ivan Ilić (Serbian Cyrillic: Иван Илић; born 17 March 2001) is a Serbian professional footballer who plays as a defensive midfielder for Serie A club Lecce, on loan from Torino, and the Serbia national team.

== Club career ==
=== Red Star Belgrade ===
Ivan started playing football with local football club Filip Filipović. Ilić moved to Red Star Belgrade youth team from Real Niš in summer 2016. Shortly after he joined the new club, he signed his first three-year professional contract. Ilić made his senior debut for Red Star Belgrade in 28 fixture match of the 2016–17 Serbian SuperLiga season against Spartak Subotica, replacing Srđan Plavšić in last minute of the game played on 1 April 2017. He became the youngest debutant in the club history and first player born 2001 who appeared in the Serbian SuperLiga.

=== Manchester City move & Red Star loan ===
In summer 2017, Ilić had been sold to Manchester City along with his older brother Luka, staying on loan at Red Star until his 18th birthday. At the beginning of October 2017, The Guardian picked Ilić as the most prospective first-year scholar in the academy of Manchester City. Ilić played his first full-time senior match in 5–0 Serbian Cup victory over Dinamo Vranje on 11 October 2017.

=== Hellas Verona & Torino ===
In 2020, Ilić joined Serie A club Hellas Verona. He was loaned to Torino on 30 January 2023.

On 27 August 2026, Ilić was loaned by Lecce, with an option to buy.

== International career ==
Ilić made his first competitive matches with Serbia under-14 national team at the international tournament in Croatia in 2015. He noted 2 caps for the team, in matches against host country and the United States. In November 2015, Ilić was invited into the Serbia U15 squad, after which he represented the team until 2016. In early 2016, he was also with U16 national team. He has been called into the Serbia U17 squad since 2016. As a team member, he qualified for the 2017 UEFA European Under-17 Championship. Ilić also continued playing with under-17 level in 2017–18 UEFA qualifications, scoring his first goal for the team in 2–1 victory over Norway on 21 October 2017.

He made his debut for Serbia national football team on 7 June 2021 in a friendly against Jamaica.

In November 2022, he was selected in Serbia's squad for the 2022 FIFA World Cup in Qatar. He played in a group stage match against Brazil. Serbia finished fourth in the group.

Ilić was selected in Serbia's squad for the UEFA Euro 2024. He played in all three group stage matches, against England, Slovenia and Denmark. Serbia finished fourth in the group.

Ilić suffered an anterior cruciate ligament injury during the European qualifier against England in November 2025.

== Style of play ==
As a left-footed player, Ivan appeared as a left-back in early years of playing football. Later he converted his position on the field to defensive midfielder, and through the youth career, Ilić usually played pairing with his older brother Luka as a central midfielder. He is also available to play a classic defensive role in 4–1–4–1 formation, which he mostly played in national team.

== Personal life ==
Born in Niš, Ilić grew up in a sports family. His father Srđan played as a winger with Radnički Niš and his mother Danijela Ilić played basketball professionally. Ivan's older brother, Luka is also a professional footballer.

== Career statistics ==
=== Club ===
As of match played 1 March 2026

Appearances and goals by club, season and competition
Club	Season	League			Cup		Continental		Total	
Club	Season	Division	Apps	Goals	Apps	Goals	Apps	Goals	Apps	Goals
Red Star Belgrade	2016–17	Serbian SuperLiga	1	0	0	0	0	0	1	0
Red Star Belgrade	2017–18	Serbian SuperLiga	0	0	1	0	0	0	1	0
Red Star Belgrade	Total		1	0	1	0	0	0	2	0
Zemun (loan)	2018–19	Serbian SuperLiga	16	3	0	0	—		16	3
NAC Breda (loan)	2019–20	Eerste Divisie	21	3	3	1	—		24	4
Hellas Verona	2020–21	Serie A	29	2	1	1	—		30	3
Hellas Verona	2021–22	Serie A	32	1	2	1	—		34	2
Hellas Verona	2022–23	Serie A	11	0	1	0	—		12	0
Hellas Verona	Total		72	3	4	2	0	0	76	5
Torino	2022–23	Serie A	14	2	1	0	—		15	2
Torino	2023–24	Serie A	31	3	2	1	—		33	4
Torino	2024–25	Serie A	19	1	1	0	—		20	1
Torino	2025–26	Serie A	8	0	0	0	—		8	0
Torino	Total		72	6	4	1	0	0	76	7
Career total			182	15	12	4	0	0	194	19

=== International ===
As of match played 13 November 2025

Appearances and goals by national team and year
National team	Year	Apps	Goals
Serbia	2021	2	0
Serbia	2022	5	0
Serbia	2023	7	0
Serbia	2024	7	0
Serbia	2025	3	0
Total		24	0
