= Abdu Conté =

Portuguese footballer

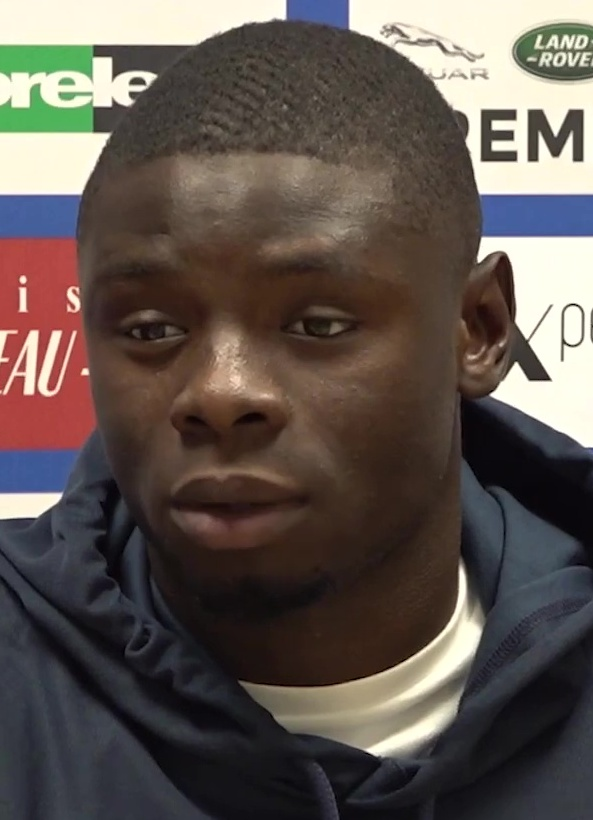
- Conté in 2022

Personal information
- Full name: Abdu Cadri Conté
- Date of birth: 24 March 1998 (age 28)
- Place of birth: Bissau, Guinea-Bissau
- Height: 1.83 m (6 ft 0 in)
- Position: Defender

Team information
- Current team: Casa Pia
- Number: 5

Youth career
- 2008–2011: Damaiense
- 2011–2017: Sporting CP

Senior career*
Years	Team	Apps	(Gls)
2017–2018	Sporting CP B	31	(0)
2019–2022	Moreirense	61	(0)
2022–2025	Troyes	58	(1)
2024–2025	→ Young Boys (loan)	16	(0)
2025–	Casa Pia	22	(0)

International career
2014–2015	Portugal U17	11	(0)
2015	Portugal U18	4	(0)
2016–2017	Portugal U19	11	(0)
2017–2018	Portugal U20	5	(0)
2021	Portugal U21	2	(0)
Medal record
Men's football
Representing Portugal
UEFA European Under-21 Championship
Runner-up	2021 Hungary–Slovenia
UEFA European Under-19 Championship
Runner-up	2017 Georgia
- * Club domestic league appearances and goals as of 18:57, 20 May 2026 (UTC)

Abdu Cadri Conté (born 24 March 1998) is a professional footballer who plays as a central defender or a left-back for Primeira Liga club Casa Pia.

He represented Sporting CP B, Moreirense, Troyes, Young Boys and Casa Pia in his career, making his Primeira Liga debut with the second of those clubs.

Born in Guinea-Bissau, Conté represented Portugal at youth level.

== Club career ==
=== Sporting CP ===
Born in Bissau, Conté joined the youth academy of Sporting CP at the age of 13, from Sport Futebol Damaiense. He made his senior debut with the former's reserves on 7 January 2017 while still a junior, playing the second half of the 1–2 home loss against Braga B in the LigaPro.

Conté finished the 2017–18 season with 24 matches – 17 starts – as his team suffered relegation as third from the bottom. He also appeared for the under-23s before his departure.

=== Moreirense ===
On 22 July 2019, Conté signed with Primeira Liga club Moreirense on a four-year contract. He made his debut in the competition on 23 August, playing the entire 0–0 away draw against Vitória de Setúbal.

Conté totalled 67 appearances during his spell at the Parque de Jogos Comendador Joaquim de Almeida Freitas, providing seven assists.

=== Troyes ===
On 12 January 2022, Conté joined Troyes of the French Ligue 1 on a four-and-a-half-year deal. He scored his first goal as a senior on 9 October, but in a 3–2 loss at Nice.

In the 2023–24 campaign, Conté's side only managed to remain in Ligue 2 as Bordeaux were relegated due to bankruptcy. In the summer, he was loaned to Swiss Super League champions Young Boys.

At the end of the season, Young Boys decided not to exercise the option to buy, and Conté returned to Troyes.

=== Casa Pia ===
Conté returned to Portugal for 2025–26, signing with top-division Casa Pia.

== International career ==
Born in Guinea-Bissau, Conté represented Portugal at youth level. He was called by under-21 manager Rui Jorge for the second stage of the 2021 UEFA European Championship in May after Thierry Correia tested positive for COVID-19, earning his first cap on 3 June by featuring 90 minutes in a 1–0 semi-final victory over Spain.

== Career statistics ==
As of match played 18 May 2025

Appearances and goals by club, season and competition
Club	Season	League			Cup		League Cup		Continental		Total	
Club	Season	Division	Apps	Goals	Apps	Goals	Apps	Goals	Apps	Goals	Apps	Goals
Sporting CP B	2016–17	Liga Portugal 2	7	0	—		—		—		7	0
Sporting CP B	2017–18	Liga Portugal 2	24	0	—		—		—		24	0
Sporting CP B	Total		31	0	—		—		—		31	0
Sporting CP	2018–19	Primeira Liga	0	0	0	0	0	0	0	0	0	0
Moreirense	2019–20	Primeira Liga	23	0	1	0	0	0	—		24	0
Moreirense	2020–21	Primeira Liga	22	0	1	0	0	0	—		23	0
Moreirense	2021–22	Primeira Liga	16	0	3	0	1	0	—		20	0
Moreirense	Total		61	0	5	0	1	0	—		67	0
Troyes	2021–22	Ligue 1	17	0	0	0	—		—		17	0
Troyes	2022–23	Ligue 1	19	1	0	0	—		—		19	1
Troyes	2023–24	Ligue 2	22	0	0	0	—		—		22	0
Troyes	Total		58	1	0	0	—		—		58	1
Young Boys (loan)	2024–25	Swiss Super League	16	0	4	0	—		1 (Note: Appearance in UEFA Champions League)	0	21	0
Career total			166	1	9	0	1	0	1	0	177	1

== Honours ==
Portugal U19

- UEFA European Under-19 Championship runner-up: 2017

Portugal U21

- UEFA European Under-21 Championship runner-up: 2021

Individual

- UEFA European Under-19 Championship Team of the Tournament: 2017
