= Thierno Baldé =

French footballer (born 2002)

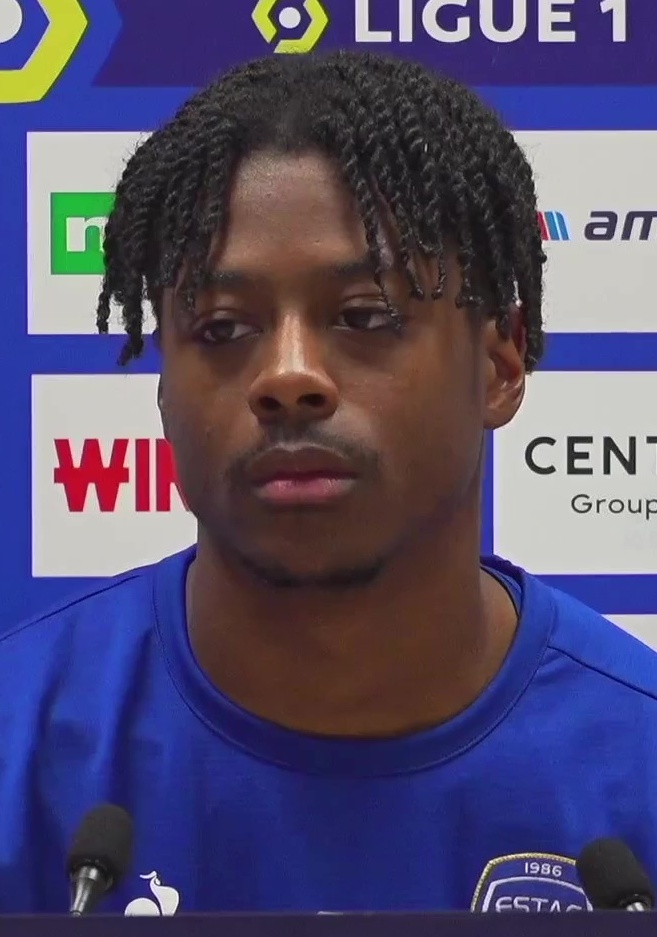
- Baldé with Troyes in 2022

Personal information
- Full name: Thierno Diawo Marc Baldé
- Date of birth: 10 June 2002 (age 24)
- Place of birth: Villeneuve-Saint-Georges, France
- Height: 1.82 m (6 ft 0 in)
- Position: Defender

Team information
- Current team: Nancy
- Number: 19

Youth career
- 2008–2010: AJ Limeil Brevannes
- 2010–2015: Sénart-Moissy
- 2015–2021: Paris Saint-Germain

Senior career*
Years	Team	Apps	(Gls)
2021–2022	Paris Saint-Germain	0	(0)
2021–2022	→ Le Havre (loan)	31	(0)
2022–2026	Troyes	44	(0)
2026–	Nancy	1	(0)
2026–	Nancy B	1	(0)

International career
2021–2022	France U20	8	(0)
2023	France U21	1	(0)
- * Club domestic league appearances and goals as of 7 September 2026

Thierno Diawo Marc Baldé (born 10 June 2002) is a French professional footballer who plays as a defender for Ligue 2 club Nancy.

== Club career ==
Baldé is a youth academy graduate of Paris Saint-Germain (PSG). He signed his first professional contract with the club on 30 June 2020. On 13 July 2021, Baldé joined Ligue 2 club Le Havre on a season-long loan deal. He made his professional debut on 14 August 2021 in a goalless draw against Rodez. By the end of the season, he had made 31 appearances for Le Havre.

On 9 August 2022, Baldé signed for Ligue 1 club Troyes on a five-year contract.

== Personal life ==
Baldé was born in France to a Guinean father and a Senegalese mother. He is the cousin of Senagelese footballer Vito Badiane.

== Career statistics ==
As of match played 14 March 2025

Appearances and goals by club, season and competition
Club	Season	League			Cup		Total	
Club	Season	Division	Apps	Goals	Apps	Goals	Apps	Goals
Le Havre (loan)	2021–22	Ligue 2	31	0	0	0	31	0
Troyes	2022–23	Ligue 1	31	0	0	0	31	0
Troyes	2023–24	Ligue 2	9	0	0	0	9	0
Troyes	2024–25	Ligue 2	4	0	1	0	5	0
Troyes	Total		44	0	1	0	45	0
Career total			75	0	1	0	76	0

== Honours ==
Individual

- Maurice Revello Tournament Best XI: 2022
