= Iké Ugbo =

Professional soccer player

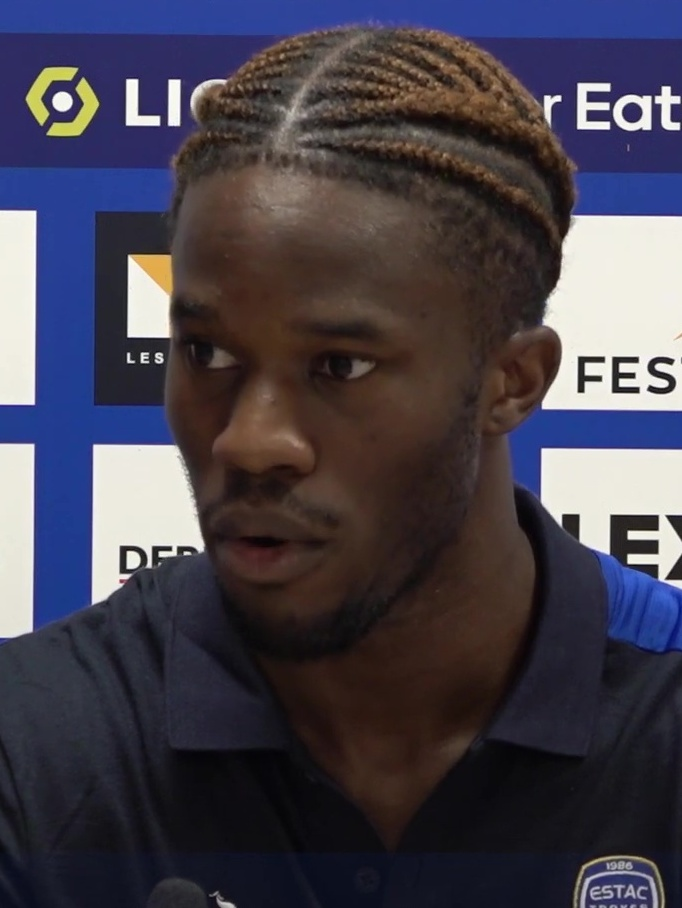
- Ugbo with Troyes in 2022

Personal information
- Full name: Iké Dominique Ugbo
- Date of birth: 21 September 1998 (age 28)
- Place of birth: Lewisham, London, England
- Height: 1.86 m (6 ft 1 in)
- Position: Forward

Team information
- Current team: Apollon Limassol (on loan from Sheffield Wednesday)
- Number: 99

Youth career
- Brampton East SC
- Woodbridge Strikers
- 2008–2017: Chelsea

Senior career*
Years	Team	Apps	(Gls)
2017–2021	Chelsea	0	(0)
2017–2018	→ Barnsley (loan)	16	(1)
2018	→ Milton Keynes Dons (loan)	15	(2)
2018–2019	→ Scunthorpe United (loan)	15	(1)
2019–2020	→ Roda JC (loan)	28	(13)
2020–2021	→ Cercle Brugge (loan)	32	(16)
2021–2022	Genk	18	(3)
2022	→ Troyes (loan)	14	(5)
2022–2024	Troyes	25	(2)
2023–2024	→ Cardiff City (loan)	20	(4)
2024	→ Sheffield Wednesday (loan)	18	(7)
2024–	Sheffield Wednesday	55	(0)
2026–	→ Apollon Limassol (loan)	7	(0)

International career
2014–2015	England U17	15	(5)
2017	England U20	5	(2)
2021–2024	Canada	9	(0)
- * Club domestic league appearances and goals as of 09:48, 8 November 2026 (UTC)

Iké Dominique Ugbo (born 21 September 1998) is a professional soccer player who plays as a forward for Apollon Limassol, on loan from EFL League One club Sheffield Wednesday. Born in England, he represented the Canada national team.

Ugbo spent much of his childhood in Canada and played youth soccer there before returning to England, where he played with the youth team of Chelsea. He had loan spells at Barnsley, Milton Keynes Dons, Scunthorpe United, Roda JC and Cercle Brugge, before signing for Genk in 2021.

He represented England at under-17 and under-20 youth levels, before making his senior international debut for Canada in 2021.

== Early life ==
Ugbo was born in Lewisham, London, England, to Nigerian parents. He moved to Canada with his family when he was four, settling in Brampton, Ontario. In Canada, he played youth soccer with Brampton East SC and Woodbridge Strikers, winning an international under-10 tournament at Disney in 2008 with the latter.

Upon his return to England, Ugbo joined the Chelsea Academy at under-10 level. He won the UEFA Youth League with Chelsea in 2014–15 and 2015–16.

== Club career ==
=== Chelsea ===
In 2015, Ugbo signed his first professional contract with Chelsea, but continued to play for the U17 through U23 sides. On 17 July 2017, Ugbo signed a season-long loan deal with Barnsley. On 5 August, Ugbo made his debut off the bench against Bristol City, which resulted in a 3–1 loss. He scored his first professional goal on 26 August against Sunderland. On 3 January 2018, Ugbo's loan spell with Barnsley was terminated, following a lack of game time.

The next day, Ugbo joined League One club Milton Keynes Dons on loan for the remainder of the 2017–18 season. On 6 January 2018, Ugbo made his debut for the club, featuring in a 1–0 third round FA Cup away victory over Queens Park Rangers.

Ugbo joined Scunthorpe United on loan in August 2018, alongside Jak Alnwick.

In August 2019, it was announced the striker would head to the Netherlands to spend the season on loan at Roda JC in the Dutch second tier.

On 18 August 2020, Ugbo went to Belgian club Cercle Brugge on loan.

=== Genk ===
In August 2021, Ugbo signed a permanent deal with Belgian club Genk. He made his first competitive appearance on 29 August against Anderlecht as a late substitute for Paul Onuachu and scored on his debut, netting the game winner in a 1–0 victory.

=== Troyes ===
In January 2022, Ugbo joined Troyes of Ligue 1 on loan. He made his debut for Troyes on 13 February, playing the full 90 in a 5–1 defeat to Brest. In Ugbo's third game for Troyes against Rennes on 20 February, he scored his first goal. In August 2022, Troyes announced they had reached a deal with Genk over the permanent transfer of Ugbo, signing him on a four-year deal until 2026.

In July 2023, Ugbo joined Championship club Cardiff City on a season-long loan deal. The next month on 6 August, Ugbo made his debut for Cardiff against Leeds United and had a goal and an assist in an eventual 2–2 draw at Elland Road.

=== Sheffield Wednesday ===
On 11 January 2024, Ugbo was recalled from Cardiff City and sent on loan to Championship rivals Sheffield Wednesday. He made his debut in a 2–1 defeat against Coventry City on 20 January, coming off the bench. His first goals for the club came against Birmingham City on 9 February, scoring a brace. After scoring five goals in five games in February 2024, he was nominated for the Championship Player of the Month.

On 8 August 2024, Ugbo returned to Sheffield Wednesday after his loan spell the previous season, signing for an undisclosed fee. He made his return in the EFL Cup against Hull City, coming on late to help his side win 2–1. His first goal on his return was in the following round against Grimsby Town. After not scoring for the rest of the season, he finally scored again at the start of the next season, in another EFL Cup tie against Bolton Wanderers on 13 August 2025.

In August 2026 he moved on loan to Apollon Limassol.

== International career ==
Ugbo was eligible to represent England (through birth), Canada (through youth residency), and Nigeria (through his parents).

=== England ===
Ugbo represented England at under-17 and under-20 level. In June 2017, Ugbo represented England U20 at the 2017 Toulon Tournament, scoring the only goal in their 1–0 opening group stage match against Angola and converted a penalty kick in the shoot-out of the final against the Ivory Coast, helping his side win the title.

=== Canada ===
In September 2021, he announced that he had decided to change his international allegiance to Nigeria. However, two months later on 4 November, he instead switched his international allegiance to Canada. The next day he was called up to the team for that month's 2022 FIFA World Cup qualification matches against Costa Rica and Mexico. He made his international debut for Canada in the match against Costa Rica on 12 November, appearing as an 83rd-minute substitute. In November 2022, Ugbo was named to Canada's final squad for the 2022 FIFA World Cup in Qatar.

== Career statistics ==
=== Club ===
As of 7 November 2026

Appearances and goals by club, season and competition
Club	Season	League			National cup (Note: Includes FA Cup, KNVB Cup, Belgian Cup, Coupe de France)		League cup (Note: Includes EFL Cup)		Other		Total	
Club	Season	Division	Apps	Goals	Apps	Goals	Apps	Goals	Apps	Goals	Apps	Goals
Chelsea U23	2016–17	—			—		—		3 (Note: Appearances in EFL Trophy)	2	3	2
Chelsea U23	2018–19	—			—		—		2	1	2	1
Chelsea U23	Total		—		—		—		5	3	5	3
Chelsea	2017–18	Premier League	0	0	0	0	0	0	0	0	0	0
Chelsea	2018–19	Premier League	0	0	0	0	0	0	0	0	0	0
Chelsea	2019–20	Premier League	0	0	0	0	0	0	0	0	0	0
Chelsea	2020–21	Premier League	0	0	0	0	0	0	0	0	0	0
Chelsea	Total		0	0	0	0	0	0	0	0	0	0
Barnsley (loan)	2017–18	Championship	16	1	—		2	0	—		18	1
Milton Keynes Dons (loan)	2017–18	League One	15	2	2	0	—		—		17	2
Scunthorpe United (loan)	2018–19	League One	15	1	1	0	—		—		16	1
Roda JC (loan)	2019–20	Eerste Divisie	28	13	1	0	—		—		29	13
Cercle Brugge (loan)	2020–21	Belgian Pro League	32	16	2	1	—		—		34	17
Genk	2021–22	Belgian Pro League	18	3	2	2	—		5 (Note: Appearances in UEFA Europa League)	1	25	6
Troyes (loan)	2021–22	Ligue 1	14	5	0	0	—		—		14	5
Troyes	2022–23	Ligue 1	24	2	1	0	—		—		25	2
Troyes	2023–24	Ligue 2	0	0	0	0	—		—		0	0
Troyes	Total		24	2	1	0	0	0	0	0	25	2
Cardiff City (loan)	2023–24	Championship	20	4	0	0	2	0	—		22	4
Sheffield Wednesday (loan)	2023–24	Championship	18	7	1	0	—		—		19	7
Sheffield Wednesday	2024–25	Championship	34	0	1	0	3	1	—		38	1
Sheffield Wednesday	2025–26	Championship	21	0	0	0	3	1	—		24	1
Sheffield Wednesday	2026–27	League One	0	0	0	0	0	0	—		0	0
Sheffield Wednesday	Total		55	0	1	0	6	2	0	0	62	2
Apollon Limassol (loan)	2026–27	Cypriot First Division	7	0	0	0	—		1 (Note: Appearance in the UEFA Europa Conference League)	0	8	0
Career total			262	54	11	3	10	2	11	4	294	63

=== International ===
As of match played 23 March 2024

Appearances and goals by national team and year
National team	Year	Apps	Goals
Canada	2021	1	0
Canada	2022	7	0
Canada	2023	0	0
Canada	2024	1	0
Total		9	0
