= Vito Badiane =

Senegalese footballer

Personal information
- Full name: Vito Badiane
- Date of birth: 2 June 1986 (age 40)
- Place of birth: Dakar, Senegal
- Position: Midfielder

Team information
- Current team: AS Douanes
- Number: 6

Youth career
- 2001–2003: Jeanne d'Arc Dakar

Senior career*
Years	Team	Apps	(Gls)
2004–2005	Jeanne d'Arc Dakar		
2006	SC Covilhã	1	(0)
2006–2009	AS Douanes		
2009–2010	Maritzburg United	21	(1)
2011–	AS Douanes		

International career
2004–2006	Senegal U-20	12	(0)
2008	Senegal U-23	3	(0)
- * Club domestic league appearances and goals

Vito Badiane (born 2 June 1986 in Dakar) is a professional Senegalese football player, who currently plays for AS Douanes.

== Career ==
Badiane began his career with ASC Jeanne d'Arc Dakar. In January 2006, he joined SC Covilhã, where he made his debut on 12 March 2006 against FC Vizela. After half a year, he returned to Senegal in July 2006, signing with AS Douanes (Dakar). He played three years with AS Douanes (Dakar), before signing with Maritzburg United F.C. in July 2009. He played his first match on 7 August 2009 against Supersport United F.C. In January 2011, Badiane left the South African club and returned to AS Douanes, where he was named as the Captain in March 2011.

== International career ==
Badiane is former member of the Senegal U-20. He was a member of the Senegal U-23 at CHAN 2009 and the UEMOA Tournament.

== Personal life ==
Badiane is the cousin of the French footballer Thierno Baldé.
