= 2021–22 VfB Stuttgart season =

VfB Stuttgart
2021–22 season
- President: Claus Vogt
- Head coach: Pellegrino Matarazzo
- Stadium: Mercedes-Benz Arena
- Bundesliga: 15th
- DFB-Pokal: Second round
- Top goalscorer: League: Saša Kalajdžić (6); All: Saša Kalajdžić (6)
Home colours	Away colours	Third colours

The 2021–22 season was the 129th season in the existence of VfB Stuttgart and the club's second consecutive season in the top flight of German football. In addition to the domestic league, VfB Stuttgart participated in this season's edition of the DFB-Pokal.

== Players ==
=== First-team squad ===
As of 25 January 2022

Note: Flags indicate national team as defined under FIFA eligibility rules; some limited exceptions apply. Players may hold more than one non-FIFA nationality.

No.	Pos.	Nation	Player
1	GK	GER	Florian Müller
2	DF	GER	Waldemar Anton (vice-captain)
3	MF	JPN	Wataru Endo (captain)
5	DF	GRE	Konstantinos Mavropanos (on loan from Arsenal)
6	MF	ENG	Clinton Mola
7	MF	FRA	Tanguy Coulibaly
8	MF	FRA	Enzo Millot
9	FW	AUT	Saša Kalajdžić
10	MF	GER	Daniel Didavi
11	MF	GER	Erik Thommy
14	FW	COD	Silas
15	DF	GER	Pascal Stenzel
16	DF	GER	Atakan Karazor
17	FW	EGY	Omar Marmoush (on loan from VfL Wolfsburg)
18	FW	POR	Tiago Tomás (on loan from Sporting CP)

No.	Pos.	Nation	Player
19	FW	DEN	Wahid Faghir
20	MF	GER	Philipp Förster
22	MF	GER	Chris Führich
23	MF	BEL	Orel Mangala
24	DF	CRO	Borna Sosa (3rd captain)
25	MF	GER	Lilian Egloff
28	MF	DEN	Nikolas Nartey
30	MF	GER	Roberto Massimo
31	MF	GER	Mateo Klimowicz
32	MF	FRA	Naouirou Ahamada
33	GK	GER	Fabian Bredlow
34	MF	TUR	Ömer Faruk Beyaz
37	DF	JPN	Hiroki Itō (on loan from Júbilo Iwata)
42	GK	GER	Florian Schock
44	FW	NED	Mohamed Sankoh

=== Out on loan ===
Note: Flags indicate national team as defined under FIFA eligibility rules; some limited exceptions apply. Players may hold more than one non-FIFA nationality.

No.	Pos.	Nation	Player
—	DF	GER	Antonis Aidonis (at Dynamo Dresden until 30 June 2022)
—	DF	GER	Maxime Awoudja (at WSG Tirol until 30 June 2022)
—	MF	MKD	Darko Churlinov (at Schalke 04 until 30 June 2022)
—	MF	GUI	Momo Cissé (at Wisła Kraków until 30 June 2023)
—	MF	GER	Philipp Klement (at SC Paderborn until 30 June 2022)
—	DF	CRO	Matej Maglica (at St. Gallen until 30 June 2022)
—	DF	ESP	Pablo Maffeo (at Mallorca until 30 June 2022)

== Transfers ==
=== In ===
No.	Pos	Player	Transferred from	Fee	Date	Source
1	GK	Florian Müller (GER)	Mainz 05 (GER)	€5,000,000	1 July 2021	
5	DF	Konstantinos Mavropanos (GRE)	Arsenal (ENG)	Loan	1 July 2021	
32	MF	Naouirou Ahamada (FRA)	Juventus U-23 (ITA)	€1,500,000	1 July 2021	
34	MF	Ömer Beyaz (TUR)	Fenerbahçe (TUR)	Free	1 July 2021	
	FW	Alou Kuol (AUS)	Central Coast Mariners (AUS)	Free	1 July 2021	
22	FW	Chris Führich (GER)	SC Paderborn (GER)	€3,000,000	19 July 2021	
8	MF	Enzo Millot (FRA)	AS Monaco (MON)	€1,500,000	14 August 2021	
17	FW	Omar Marmoush (EGY)	VfL Wolfsburg (GER)	Loan	30 August 2021	
19	FW	Wahid Faghir (DEN)	Vejle BK (DEN)	€4,500,000	31 August 2021	
18	FW	Tiago Tomás (POR)	Sporting CP (POR)	Loan	30 January 2022	

=== Out ===
No.	Pos	Player	Transferred to	Fee	Date	Source
1	GK	Gregor Kobel (SUI)	Borussia Dortmund (GER)	€15,000,000	1 July 2021	
8	MF	Gonzalo Castro (GER)		Free	1 July 2021	
17	DF	Maxime Awoudja (GER)	WSG Tirol (AUT)	Loan	1 July 2021	
22	FW	Nicolás González (ARG)	Fiorentina (ITA)	€23,000,000	1 July 2021	
35	DF	Marcin Kamiński (POL)	Schalke 04 (GER)	Free	1 July 2021	
26	DF	Antonis Aidonis (GER)	Dynamo Dresden (GER)	Loan	5 July 2021	
7	DF	Pablo Maffeo (ESP)	RCD Mallorca (ESP)	Loan	7 July 2021	
13	GK	Jens Grahl (GER)	Eintracht Frankfurt (GER)	€250,000	19 July 2021	
36	DF	Luca Mack (GER)	Újpest (HUN)	Undisclosed	6 August 2021	
19	MF	Darko Churlinov (MKD)	Schalke 04 (GER)	Loan	18 August 2021	
48	DF	Matej Maglica (CRO)	St. Gallen (SUI)	Loan	3 January 2022	
21	MF	Philipp Klement (GER)	SC Paderborn (GER)	Loan	13 January 2022	
18	FW	Hamadi Al Ghaddioui (GER)	Pafos FC (CYP)	Undisclosed	14 January 2022	
29	MF	Momo Cissé (GUI)	Wisła Kraków (POL)	Loan	16 January 2022	
4	DF	Marc-Oliver Kempf (GER)	Hertha BSC (GER)	€500,000	25 January 2022	

== Pre-season and friendlies ==
Win Draw Loss

10 July 2021 Friendly	VfB Stuttgart	3–0	St. Gallen	Stuttgart, Germany
15:00 CEST (UTC+2)	Al Ghaddioui 47', 49', 51'	Report		Stadium: Robert-Schlienz-Stadion; Attendance: 1,300

14 July 2021 Friendly	VfB Stuttgart	1–1	SV Darmstadt 98	Stuttgart, Germany
15:15 CEST (UTC+2)	Coulibaly 43'	Report	Hosnak 8'	Stadium: Robert-Schlienz-Stadion; Attendance: 0

20 July 2021 Friendly	VfB Stuttgart	1–1	Liverpool	Saalfelden, Austria
18:45 CEST (UTC+2)	Förster 6'	Report	Mané 20'	Stadium: Saalfelden Arena; Attendance: 0
Note: The match was played as a thirty-minute game.

20 July 2021 Friendly	VfB Stuttgart	1–0	Wacker Innsbruck	Saalfelden, Austria
19:30 CEST (UTC+2)	Stenzel 3'	Report		Stadium: Saalfelden Arena; Attendance: 0
Note: The match was played as a thirty-minute game.

23 July 2021 Friendly	VfB Stuttgart	5–2 (a.e.t.)	Arminia Bielefeld	Kufstein, Austria
16:15 CEST (UTC+2)	Massimo 34', 39'; Thommy 96'; Sankoh 105', 114'	Report	Krüger 40'; Nilsson 74'	Stadium: Kufstein Arena; Attendance: 0

31 July 2021 Friendly	VfB Stuttgart	0–3	Barcelona	Stuttgart, Germany
19:00 CEST (UTC+2)		Report	Memphis 21'; Demir 36'; Puig 73'; Busquets (yellow card) 87'	Stadium: Mercedes-Benz-Arena; Attendance: 25,000; Referee: Tobias Reichel

7 October 2021 Friendly	VfB Stuttgart	1–4	SV Sandhausen	Stuttgart, Germany
15:00 CEST (UTC+2)	Klimowicz 44'	Report	Sicker 9'; Testroet 12' (pen.); Kinsombi 38'; Keita-Ruel 70'	Stadium: Mercedes-Benz-Arena; Attendance: 0
Note: The match was played in two thirty-five-minute halves.

10 November 2021 Friendly	VfB Stuttgart	1–0	Zürich	Stuttgart, Germany
15:00 CET (UTC+1)	Kuol 90'	Report		Stadium: Rasenplatz 1 VfB Stuttgart; Attendance: 0

28 January 2022 Friendly	Rostov	1–2	VfB Stuttgart	Marbella, Spain
11:00 CET (UTC+1)	Glebov 18'; Sukhomlinov (yellow card) 67'	Report	Millot (yellow card) 65'; Didavi (yellow card) 66'; Tibidi 87'; Förster 89' (pen.)	Stadium: Marbella Football Center

24 March 2022 Friendly	VfB Stuttgart	2–3	SV Sandhausen	Stuttgart, Germany
15:00 CET (UTC+1)	Tibidi 14', 22'	Report	Seufert 47'; Esswein 53'; Ritzmaier 70'	Stadium: Rasenplatz 3 VfB Stuttgart
Note: The match was played in two thirty-five-minute halves.

== Competitions ==
=== Overall record ===
Competition	First match	Last match	Starting round	Final position	Record							
Competition	First match	Last match	Starting round	Final position	Pld	W	D	L	GF	GA	GD	Win %
Bundesliga	14 August 2021	14 May 2022	Matchday 1	15th	34	7	12	15	41	59	−18	20.59
DFB-Pokal	7 August 2021	27 October 2021	First round	Second round	2	1	0	1	6	2	+4	50.00
Total					36	8	12	16	47	61	−14	22.22

Source: Soccerway

=== Bundesliga ===
==== League table ====
Pos	Team	Pld	W	D	L	GF	GA	GD	Pts	Qualification or relegation
13	VfL Bochum	34	12	6	16	38	52	−14	42	
14	FC Augsburg	34	10	8	16	39	56	−17	38	
15	VfB Stuttgart	34	7	12	15	41	59	−18	33	
16	Hertha BSC (O)	34	9	6	19	37	71	−34	33	Qualification for the relegation play-offs
17	Arminia Bielefeld (R)	34	5	13	16	27	53	−26	28	Relegation to 2. Bundesliga

Source: DFB
Rules for classification: 1) Points; 2) Goal difference; 3) Goals scored; 4) Head-to-head results; 5) Head-to-head away goals scored; 6) Away goals scored; 7) Play-off.
(O) Play-off winners; (R) Relegated

==== Results summary ====
Overall								Home						Away					
Pld	W	D	L	GF	GA	GD	Pts	W	D	L	GF	GA	GD	W	D	L	GF	GA	GD
34	7	12	15	41	59	−18	33	6	4	7	28	32	−4	1	8	8	13	27	−14

Source: DFB

==== Results by round ====
Round	1	2	3	4	5	6	7	8	9	10	11	12	13	14	15	16	17	18	19	20	21	22	23	24	25	26	27	28	29	30	31	32	33	34
Ground	H	A	H	A	H	A	H	A	H	A	H	A	H	H	A	H	A	A	H	A	H	A	H	A	H	A	H	A	H	A	A	H	A	H
Result	W	L	L	D	L	D	W	D	D	L	L	L	W	D	W	L	L	D	L	L	L	L	D	L	W	D	W	D	L	D	L	D	D	W
Position	1	10	13	10	14	13	12	12	13	13	15	16	15	15	15	15	16	15	17	17	17	17	17	17	17	16	14	15	15	16	16	16	16	15

Source: DFB
A = Away; H = Home; W = Win; D = Draw; L = Loss

==== Matches ====
The league fixtures were announced on 25 June 2021.

14 August 2021 1	VfB Stuttgart	5–1	Greuther Fürth	Stuttgart
15:30 CEST (UTC+2)	Endo 30'; Klement 36'; Kempf 55', 76'; Al Ghaddioui 61'	Report	Seguin (yellow card) 53'; Leweling 90+3'	Stadium: Mercedes-Benz Arena; Attendance: 18,109; Referee: Felix Zwayer

20 August 2021 2	RB Leipzig	4–0	VfB Stuttgart	Leipzig
20:30 CEST (UTC+2)	Szoboszlai 38', 52'; Forsberg 46'; Silva 65' (pen.)	Report	Kempf (yellow card) 64'; Förster (yellow card) 68'; Mavropanos (yellow card) 71'	Stadium: Red Bull Arena; Attendance: 23,100; Referee: Florian Badstübner

28 August 2021 3	VfB Stuttgart	2–3	SC Freiburg	Stuttgart
15:30 CEST (UTC+2)	Förster (yellow card) 13'; Mavropanos 45'; Al Ghaddioui 45+2'; Klimowicz (yellow card) 55'	Report	Jeong 3', 9'; Höler 28'; Schade (yellow card) 89'	Stadium: Mercedes-Benz Arena; Attendance: 25,000; Referee: Frank Willenborg

12 September 2021 4	Eintracht Frankfurt	1–1	VfB Stuttgart	Frankfurt
15:30 CEST (UTC+2)	Lenz (yellow card) 57'; Kostić 79'	Report	Marmoush (yellow card) 32', (goal) 88'; Anton (yellow card) 36', (red card) 82'; Coulibaly (yellow card) 69'; Mangala (yellow card) 77'	Stadium: Deutsche Bank Park; Attendance: 25,000; Referee: Matthias Jöllenbeck

19 September 2021 5	VfB Stuttgart	1–3	Bayer Leverkusen	Stuttgart
15:30 CEST (UTC+2)	Mangala 38'; Karazor (yellow card) 63'; Coulibaly (yellow card) 76'	Report	Andrich 2', (red card) 32'; Schick 19'; Frimpong (yellow card) 36'; Bakker (yellow card) 37'; Aránguiz (yellow card) 58'; Wirtz 70'	Stadium: Mercedes-Benz Arena; Attendance: 23,450; Referee: Benjamin Cortus

26 September 2021 6	VfL Bochum	0–0	VfB Stuttgart	Bochum
15:30 CEST (UTC+2)	Bella-Kotchap (yellow card) 38'; Mašović (yellow card) 75'	Report	Sosa (yellow card) 14'; Klimowicz (yellow card) 19'; Al Ghaddioui (yellow card) 43'; Endo (yellow card) 58'; Coulibaly (yellow card) 63'	Stadium: Vonovia Ruhrstadion; Attendance: 15,300; Referee: Christian Dingert

2 October 2021 7	VfB Stuttgart	3–1	1899 Hoffenheim	Stuttgart
15:30 CEST (UTC+2)	Kempf 18'; Mavropanos 60'; Massimo 81'	Report	Samassékou (yellow card) 43'; Bruun Larsen 84'	Stadium: Mercedes-Benz Arena; Attendance: 24,211; Referee: Harm Osmers

16 October 2021 8	Borussia Mönchengladbach	1–1	VfB Stuttgart	Mönchengladbach
18:30 CEST (UTC+2)	Hofmann 43'; Koné (yellow card) 63'; Herrmann (yellow card) 80'; Bennetts (yellow card) 82'	Report	Mavropanos 15'; Karazor (yellow card) 45+1'; Führich (yellow card) 64'; Kempf (yellow card) 88'	Stadium: Borussia-Park; Attendance: 41,608; Referee: Felix Brych

24 October 2021 9	VfB Stuttgart	1–1	Union Berlin	Stuttgart
17:30 CEST (UTC+2)	Nartey (yellow card) 55'; Karazor (yellow card) 57' (yellow-red card) 58'; Faghir 90+3'	Report	Awoniyi 31'; Khedira (yellow card) 63'	Stadium: Mercedes-Benz Arena; Attendance: 32,595; Referee: Florian Badstübner

31 October 2021 10	FC Augsburg	4–1	VfB Stuttgart	Augsburg
15:30 CET (UTC+1)	Gouweleeuw (yellow card) 21', (goal) 52'; Oxford 30'; Caligiuri (yellow card) 32'; Niederlechner 72'; Finnbogason 81'; Gruezo (yellow card) 90+3'	Report	Führich 7'; Didavi (yellow card) 39'; Coulibaly (yellow card) 59'; Al Ghaddioui (yellow card) 77'; Förster (yellow card) 90+2'	Stadium: WWK Arena; Attendance: 17,500; Referee: Patrick Ittrich

6 November 2021 11	VfB Stuttgart	0–1	Arminia Bielefeld	Stuttgart
15:30 CET (UTC+1)		Report	Okugawa 19'; Brunner (yellow card) 54'; Kunze (yellow card) 83'; Prietl (yellow card) 90+3'	Stadium: Mercedes-Benz Arena; Attendance: 33,550; Referee: Christian Dingert

20 November 2021 12	Borussia Dortmund	2–1	VfB Stuttgart	Dortmund
15:30 CET (UTC+1)	Malen 56'; Reus 85'	Report	Coulibaly (yellow card) 36'; Anton (yellow card) 48'; Massimo 63'	Stadium: Signal Iduna Park; Attendance: 57,900; Referee: Harm Osmers

26 November 2021 13	VfB Stuttgart	2–1	Mainz 05	Stuttgart
20:30 CET (UTC+1)	Itō 21'; Mangala (yellow card) 36'; Sosa 51', (yellow card) 90+2'	Report	Martín (yellow card) 9'; Hack 39'; Boëtius (yellow card) 90+5'	Stadium: Mercedes-Benz Arena; Attendance: 25,000; Referee: Matthias Jöllenbeck

5 December 2021 14	VfB Stuttgart	2–2	Hertha BSC	Stuttgart
15:30 CET (UTC+1)	Marmoush 15'; Förster 19'	Report	Jovetić 40', 76'; Boateng (yellow card) 90+1'	Stadium: Mercedes-Benz Arena; Attendance: 395; Referee: Benjamin Brand

11 December 2021 15	VfL Wolfsburg	0–2	VfB Stuttgart	Wolfsburg
18:30 CET (UTC+1)	Bornauw (yellow card) 24'; Arnold (yellow card) 79'	Report	Mavropanos 25'; Itō (yellow card) 41'; Förster 63'; Marmoush (yellow card) 71', (penalty missed) 79'	Stadium: Volkswagen Arena; Attendance: 5,000; Referee: Sascha Stegemann

14 December 2021 16	VfB Stuttgart	0–5	Bayern Munich	Stuttgart
18:30 CET (UTC+1)	Karazor (yellow card) 64'	Report	Gnabry 40', 53', 74'; Davies (yellow card) 55'; Lewandowski 69', 72'	Stadium: Mercedes-Benz Arena; Attendance: 0 Referee: Robert Schröder

19 December 2021 17	1. FC Köln	1–0	VfB Stuttgart	Cologne
17:30 CET (UTC+1)	Kainz (yellow card) 69'; Hector (yellow card) 86'; Modeste 88'; Thielmann (yellow card) 90+3'	Report	Marmoush (yellow card) 21'	Stadium: RheinEnergieStadion; Attendance: 15,000; Referee: Bastian Dankert

8 January 2022 18	Greuther Fürth	0–0	VfB Stuttgart	Fürth
15:30 CET (UTC+1)		Report	Anton (yellow card) 42'	Stadium: Sportpark Ronhof; Attendance: 0 Referee: Felix Brych

15 January 2022 19	VfB Stuttgart	0–2	RB Leipzig	Stuttgart
15:30 CET (UTC+1)	Coulibaly (yellow card) 8'; Tibidi (yellow card) 53'; Kalajdžić (yellow card) 90+2'	Report	Silva 11' (pen.); Poulsen (yellow card) 55'; Nkunku 70'	Stadium: Mercedes-Benz Arena; Attendance: 500; Referee: Daniel Schlager

22 January 2022 20	SC Freiburg	2–0	VfB Stuttgart	Freiburg
15:30 CET (UTC+1)	Höfler (yellow card) 24'; Itō 37' (o.g.); Schade 72'	Report	Sosa (yellow card) 90+4'	Stadium: Europa-Park Stadion; Attendance: 500; Referee: Tobias Stieler

5 February 2022 21	VfB Stuttgart	2–3	Eintracht Frankfurt	Stuttgart
15:30 CET (UTC+1)	Anton 42'; Kalajdžić 70'	Report	Ndicka 7'; Hrustic 47', 77'	Stadium: Mercedes-Benz Arena; Attendance: 10,000; Referee: Sascha Stegemann

12 February 2022 22	Bayer Leverkusen	4–2	VfB Stuttgart	Leverkusen
18:30 CET (UTC+1)	Diaby 41'; Demirbay (yellow card) 45'; Adli 52'; Andrich (yellow card) 63'; Bakker (yellow card) 83'; Wirtz 86'; Schick 90'	Report	Tomás 49', 88'; Endo (yellow card) 51'; Mavropanos (yellow card) 90+4'	Stadium: BayArena; Attendance: 10,000; Referee: Felix Brych

19 February 2022 23	VfB Stuttgart	1–1	VfL Bochum	Stuttgart
15:30 CET (UTC+1)	Bella-Kotchap 56' (o.g.)	Report	Osterhage (yellow card) 23'; Antwi-Adjei (yellow card) 60'; Gamboa (yellow card) 64'; Polter (yellow card) 90'; Löwen 90+4' (pen.)	Stadium: Mercedes-Benz Arena; Attendance: 20,059; Referee: Harm Osmers

25 February 2022 24	1899 Hoffenheim	2–1	VfB Stuttgart	Sinsheim
20:30 CET (UTC+1)	Geiger (yellow card) 16'; Baumgartner (yellow card) 33', (goal) 85', 90'; Hübner (yellow card) 45+4'	Report	Endo 58'; Anton (yellow card) 81'; Förster (yellow card) 90+6'	Stadium: Rhein-Neckar-Arena; Attendance: 18,099; Referee: Matthias Jöllenbeck

5 March 2022 25	VfB Stuttgart	3–2	Borussia Mönchengladbach	Stuttgart
18:30 CET (UTC+1)	Endo 38'; Führich 51'; Anton (yellow card) 54'; Kalajdžić 83'	Report	Pléa 14'; Bensebaini (yellow card) 27'; Thuram 35'; Scally (yellow card) 81'	Stadium: Mercedes-Benz Arena; Attendance: 25,000; Referee: Christian Dingert

12 March 2022 26	Union Berlin	1–1	VfB Stuttgart	Berlin
15:30 CET (UTC+1)	Gießelmann (yellow card) 32'; Awoniyi 41' (pen.); Schäfer (yellow card) 90+4'	Report	Mavropanos (yellow card) 40'; Itō (yellow card) 79'; Kalajdžić 90'	Stadium: Stadion An der Alten Försterei; Attendance: 16,509; Referee: Robert Hartmann

19 March 2022 27	VfB Stuttgart	3–2	FC Augsburg	Stuttgart
15:30 CET (UTC+1)	Anton 44'; Marmoush 79'; Tomás (yellow card) 80', (goal) 85'; Führich (yellow card) 90+2'	Report	Hahn 6'; Gregoritsch 45+1'; Valentin (yellow card) 78'; Uduokhai (yellow card) 79'; Winther (yellow card) 81'	Stadium: Mercedes-Benz Arena; Attendance: 55,785; Referee: Patrick Ittrich

2 April 2022 28	Arminia Bielefeld	1–1	VfB Stuttgart	Bielefeld
15:30 CEST (UTC+2)	Brunner (yellow card) 28'; Krüger 59'	Report	Kalajdžić 25' (pen.), (yellow card) 29'; Anton (yellow card) 33'; Tomás (yellow card) 47'; Karazor (yellow card) 73'; Mangala (yellow card) 90+7'	Stadium: Bielefelder Alm; Attendance: 26,011; Referee: Patrick Ittrich

8 April 2022 29	VfB Stuttgart	0–2	Borussia Dortmund	Stuttgart
20:30 CEST (UTC+2)	Mangala (yellow card) 45+3'; Karazor (yellow card) 86'	Report	Brandt 12', 71'; Bellingham (yellow card) 82'	Stadium: Mercedes-Benz Arena; Attendance: 58,248; Referee: Harm Osmers

16 April 2022 30	Mainz 05	0–0	VfB Stuttgart	Mainz
15:30 CEST (UTC+2)		Report	Stenzel (yellow card) 70'	Stadium: Opel Arena; Attendance: 30,128; Referee: Florian Badstübner

24 April 2022 31	Hertha BSC	2–0	VfB Stuttgart	Berlin
17:30 CEST (UTC+2)	Selke 4'; Darida (yellow card) 64'; Belfodil 90+3'	Report	Endo (yellow card) 41'	Stadium: Olympiastadion; Attendance: 54,589; Referee: Felix Brych

30 April 2022 32	VfB Stuttgart	1–1	VfL Wolfsburg	Stuttgart
15:30 CEST (UTC+2)	Sosa (yellow card) 22'; Endo (yellow card) 34'; Karazor (yellow card) 55'; Führich 89'	Report	Brooks 13'; Schlager (yellow card) 61'; L. Nmecha (yellow card) 66'	Stadium: Mercedes-Benz Arena; Attendance: 55,000; Referee: Sven Jablonski

8 May 2022 33	Bayern Munich	2–2	VfB Stuttgart	Munich
17:30 CEST (UTC+2)	Nianzou (yellow card) 6'; Gnabry 35'; Müller 44'; Davies (yellow card) 90+1'; Coman (red card) 90+6'	Report	Tomás 8'; Karazor (yellow card) 39'; Führich (yellow card) 50'; Kalajdžić 52'; Coulibaly (yellow card) 74'	Stadium: Allianz Arena; Attendance: 75,000; Referee: Deniz Aytekin

14 May 2022 34	VfB Stuttgart	2–1	1. FC Köln	Stuttgart
15:30 CEST (UTC+2)	Kalajdžić (penalty missed) 12', 12'; Endo 90+2'; Coulibaly (yellow card) 90+7'	Report	Modeste 60', (yellow card) 90'; Horn (yellow card) 79'; Schmitz (yellow card) 81'; Schwäbe (yellow card) 90+7'	Stadium: Mercedes-Benz Arena; Attendance: 52,230; Referee: Robert Schröder

=== DFB-Pokal ===
7 August 2021 First round	BFC Dynamo	0–6	VfB Stuttgart	Berlin
15:30 CEST (UTC+2)	Schulz (yellow card) 7'; Bolyki (yellow card) 38'; Steinborn (yellow card) 41'	Report	Al Ghaddioui 26'; Massimo (yellow card) 42'; Sosa 45+1'; Mavropanos 53'; Klimowicz 68'; Sankoh 82'; Churlinov 88'	Stadium: Stadion im Sportforum; Attendance: 3,500; Referee: Eric Müller

27 October 2021 Second round	VfB Stuttgart	0–2	1. FC Köln	Stuttgart
20:45 CEST (UTC+2)	Ahamada (yellow card) 86'	Report	Modeste 72', 77'; Uth (yellow card) 75'	Stadium: Mercedes-Benz Arena; Attendance: 25,000; Referee: Deniz Aytekin

== Statistics ==
=== Appearances and goals ===
No.	Pos	Nat	Player	Total		Bundesliga		DFB-Pokal	
No.	Pos	Nat	Player	Apps	Goals	Apps	Goals	Apps	Goals
Goalkeepers
1	GK	(Germany) GER	Florian Müller	30	0	30	0	0	0
33	GK	(Germany) GER	Fabian Bredlow	6	0	4	0	2	0
42	GK	(Germany) GER	Fabian Schock	0	0	0	0	0	0
Defenders
2	DF	(Germany) GER	Waldemar Anton	30	2	29	2	0+1	0
5	DF	(Greece) GRE	Konstantinos Mavropanos	33	5	31	4	2	1
15	DF	(Germany) GER	Pascal Stenzel	17	0	9+7	0	0+1	0
16	DF	(Germany) GER	Atakan Karazor	25	0	23+1	0	1	0
24	DF	(Croatia) CRO	Borna Sosa	30	2	28	1	2	1
37	DF	(Japan) JPN	Hiroki Itō	31	1	26+3	1	2	0
Midfielders
3	MF	(Japan) JPN	Wataru Endo	34	4	33	4	1	0
6	MF	(England) ENG	Clinton Mola	3	0	1+2	0	0	0
7	MF	(France) FRA	Tanguy Coulibaly	22	0	11+10	0	1	0
8	MF	(France) FRA	Enzo Millot	6	0	0+6	0	0	0
10	MF	(Germany) GER	Daniel Didavi	12	0	2+8	0	1+1	0
11	MF	(Germany) GER	Erik Thommy	12	0	1+10	0	0+1	0
20	MF	(Germany) GER	Philipp Förster	21	2	11+9	2	1	0
22	MF	(Germany) GER	Chris Führich	26	3	21+4	3	1	0
23	MF	(Belgium) BEL	Orel Mangala	29	1	22+6	1	1	0
25	MF	(Germany) GER	Lilian Egloff	4	0	0+4	0	0	0
28	MF	(Denmark) DEN	Nikolas Nartey	8	0	4+4	0	0	0
30	MF	(Germany) GER	Roberto Massimo	20	1	11+8	1	1	0
31	MF	(Germany) GER	Mateo Klimowicz	17	1	7+8	0	2	1
32	MF	(France) FRA	Naouirou Ahamada	4	0	0+3	0	0+1	0
34	MF	(Turkey) TUR	Ömer Faruk Beyaz	5	0	0+4	0	0+1	0
Forwards
9	FW	(Austria) AUT	Saša Kalajdžić	15	6	13+2	6	0	0
14	FW	(Democratic Republic of the Congo) COD	Silas	9	0	3+6	0	0	0
17	FW	(Egypt) EGY	Omar Marmoush	21	3	19+2	3	0	0
18	FW	(Portugal) POR	Tiago Tomás	14	4	13+1	4	0	0
19	FW	(Denmark) DEN	Wahid Faghir	6	1	0+5	1	0+1	0
44	FW	(Netherlands) NED	Mohamed Sankoh	2	1	0+1	0	0+1	1
50	FW	(France) FRA	Alexis Tibidi	13	0	2+11	0	0	0
Players transferred out during the season
4	DF	(Germany) GER	Marc-Oliver Kempf	14	3	10+2	3	2	0
18	FW	(Germany) GER	Hamadi Al Ghaddioui	13	3	7+4	2	1+1	1
19	MF	(North Macedonia) MKD	Darko Churlinov	1	1	0	0	0+1	1
21	MF	(Germany) GER	Philipp Klement	7	1	3+3	1	1	0
29	MF	(Guinea) GUI	Momo Cissé	0	0	0	0	0	0
48	DF	(Croatia) CRO	Matej Maglica	1	0	0+1	0	0	0

Source: Competitions

=== Goalscorers ===
Rank	Pos.	No.	Nat.	Player	Bundesliga	DFB-Pokal	Total
1	FW	9	(Austria)	Saša Kalajdžić	6	0	6
2	DF	5	(Greece)	Konstantinos Mavropanos	4	1	5
3	MF	3	(Japan)	Wataru Endo	4	0	4
3	FW	18	(Portugal)	Tiago Tomás	4	0	4
5	DF	4	(Germany)	Marc-Oliver Kempf	3	0	3
5	FW	17	(Egypt)	Omar Marmoush	3	0	3
5	FW	18	(Germany)	Hamadi Al Ghaddioui	2	1	3
5	MF	22	(Germany)	Chris Führich	3	0	3
9	DF	2	(Germany)	Waldemar Anton	2	0	2
9	MF	20	(Germany)	Philipp Förster	2	0	2
9	DF	24	(Croatia)	Borna Sosa	1	1	2
9	MF	30	(Germany)	Roberto Massimo	2	0	2
13	MF	19	(North Macedonia)	Darko Churlinov	0	1	1
13	FW	19	(Denmark)	Wahid Faghir	1	0	1
13	MF	21	(Germany)	Philipp Klement	1	0	1
13	MF	23	(Belgium)	Orel Mangala	1	0	1
13	MF	31	(Germany)	Mateo Klimowicz	0	1	1
13	DF	37	(Japan)	Hiroki Itō	1	0	1
13	FW	44	(Netherlands)	Mohamed Sankoh	0	1	1
Own goals					1	0	1
Totals					41	6	47
