= Wilson Odobert =

French footballer (born 2004)

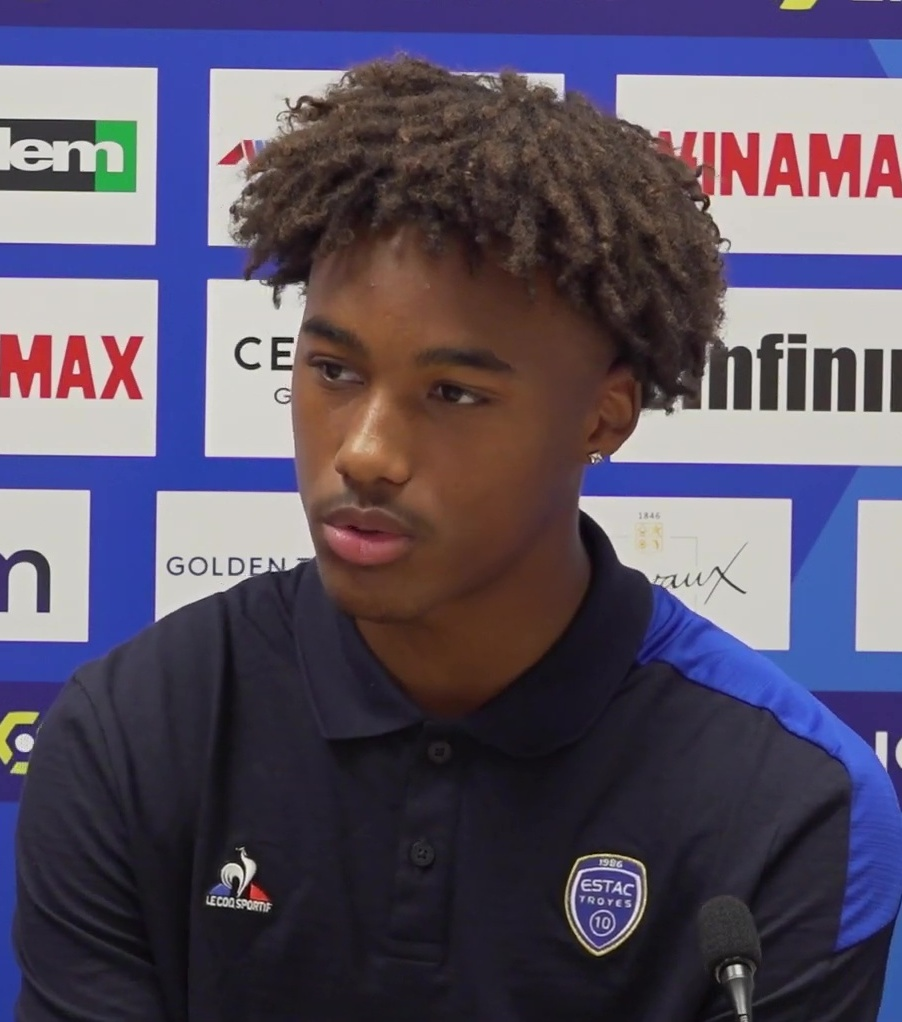
- Odobert with Troyes in 2022

Personal information
- Full name: Wilson Serge Eric Odobert
- Date of birth: 28 November 2004 (age 21)
- Place of birth: Meaux, France
- Height: 1.82 m (6 ft 0 in)
- Positions: Attacking midfielder; left winger

Team information
- Current team: Tottenham Hotspur
- Number: 28

Youth career
- 2010–2017: USF Trilport
- 2017–2022: Paris Saint-Germain

Senior career*
Years	Team	Apps	(Gls)
2022–2023	Troyes	32	(4)
2023–2024	Burnley	30	(4)
2024–	Tottenham Hotspur	40	(1)

International career^{‡}
2019	France U16	2	(0)
2022	France U18	2	(0)
2022–2023	France U19	9	(1)
2023–2024	France U20	7	(1)
2023–	France U21	16	(5)
2024	France Olympic	2	(1)
- * Club domestic league appearances and goals as of 07:15, 10 June 2026 (UTC) ‡ National team caps and goals as of 23:30, 17 November 2025 (UTC)

Wilson Serge Eric Odobert (born 28 November 2004) is a French professional footballer who plays as an attacking midfielder or winger for Premier League club Tottenham Hotspur.

== Club career ==
=== Troyes ===
A youth product of USF Trilport and Paris Saint-Germain, Odobert was offered a professional contract with the latter in January 2022 after strong performances with the club's under-19 sides. He rejected the offer, and on 15 July 2022, transferred to Troyes, signing a three-year contract. Odobert made his professional debut with Troyes in a 3–2 Ligue 1 loss to Montpellier on 7 August 2022. He scored his first professional goal in a 3–1 league win over Angers on 28 August, becoming the second-youngest league goalscorer in Troyes's history.

=== Burnley ===
On 12 August 2023, Odobert signed for Premier League club Burnley. He scored his first goal in a 4–1 defeat to Chelsea, becoming the youngest Premier League goalscorer in the club's history.

=== Tottenham Hotspur ===
On 16 August 2024, it was announced that Burnley and Tottenham Hotspur had reached an agreement for the transfer of Odobert to the London-based club. Odobert made his debut for Tottenham on 24 August 2024, starting in a 4–0 home victory over Everton.

Odobert suffered a hamstring injury during an EFL Cup 3rd round tie against Coventry City on 18 September. He returned on 24 October for a Europa League league phase match against AZ Alkmaar, though a week later on 29 October Tottenham head coach Ange Postecoglou revealed in a press conference that Odobert had suffered "a setback during the week and it seems like it is a serious one...(It's) not exactly the same (injury) but (it's the) same area", with Odobert undergoing surgery on his right hamstring on 16 November Odobert returned to training on 4 February 2025 and made his first appearance for Spurs for over 3 months as an 87th minute substitute for Spurs' 1–0 home win over Manchester United on 16 February.

On 13 March 2025, Odobert scored his first two goals for Spurs in a 3–1 victory against AZ Alkmaar during Europa League round of 16. Two months later, on 4 May, he scored his first Premier League goal for the club in a 1–1 away draw against West Ham United. Later that year, on 4 November, he netted his first UEFA Champions League goal in a 4–0 victory over Copenhagen.

== International career ==
Odobert represents France internationally, having played at U-16, U-18 through U-21 levels. He is of Martiniquais descent.

== Career statistics ==
As of match played 10 February 2026

Appearances and goals by club, season and competition
Club	Season	League			National cup (Note: Includes FA Cup)		League cup (Note: Includes EFL Cup)		Europe		Total	
Club	Season	Division	Apps	Goals	Apps	Goals	Apps	Goals	Apps	Goals	Apps	Goals
Troyes	2022–23	Ligue 1	32	4	0	0	—		—		32	4
Burnley	2023–24	Premier League	29	3	1	0	3	1	—		33	4
Burnley	2024–25	Championship	1	1	—		—		—		1	1
Burnley	Total		30	4	1	0	3	1	—		34	5
Tottenham Hotspur	2024–25	Premier League	16	1	0	0	1	0	4 (Note: Appearances in UEFA Europa League)	2	21	3
Tottenham Hotspur	2025–26	Premier League	24	0	1	1	1	0	7 (Note: Appearances in UEFA Champions League)	1	33	2
Tottenham Hotspur	Total		40	1	1	1	2	0	11	4	54	5
Career total			102	9	2	1	5	1	11	4	120	14

== Honours ==
Tottenham Hotspur

- UEFA Europa League: 2024–25
