= Tanguy Zoukrou =

French footballer (born 2003)

Personal information
- Full name: Tanguy Xavier Banhie Zoukrou
- Date of birth: 7 May 2003 (age 23)
- Place of birth: Le Chesnay, France
- Height: 1.89 m (6 ft 2 in)
- Position: Centre-back

Team information
- Current team: Kocaelispor (on loan from Young Boys)

Youth career
- 2010–2017: FO Plaisir
- 2017–2020: ACBB
- 2020–2021: Troyes

Senior career*
Years	Team	Apps	(Gls)
2020–2022	Troyes II	16	(0)
2021–2024	Troyes	43	(1)
2024–	Young Boys	29	(0)
2026–	→ Kocaelispor (loan)	0	(0)

International career
2021–2022	France U19	10	(0)
2022–2024	France U20	15	(0)
- * Club domestic league appearances and goals as of 17 May 2026

Tanguy Xavier Banhie Zoukrou (born 7 May 2003) is a French professional footballer who plays as a centre-back for Turkish Süper Lig club Kocaelispor on loan from the Swiss club Young Boys.

== Career ==
Zoukrou is a youth product of FO Plaisir and ACBB. He joined Troyes in January 2020. He made his professional debut with Troyes in a 2–1 Ligue 1 loss to Paris Saint-Germain on 7 August 2021. On 28 September 2021, he signed a professional contract with Troyes, keeping him at the club until 2024.

On 1 July 2024, BSC Young Boys announced the signing of Zoukrou, on a contract until 30 June 2028. On 6 July 2026, Young Boys loaned him to Kocaelispor in Turkey for the season, with an option to buy.

== International career ==
Born in France, Zoukrou holds Ivorian and French nationalities. He was called up to the France U20s for the 2023 FIFA U-20 World Cup.

== Career statistics ==
As of match played 17 May 2026

Appearances and goals by club, season and competition
Club	Season	League			National Cup		Europe		Total	
Club	Season	Division	Apps	Goals	Apps	Goals	Apps	Goals	Apps	Goals
Troyes II	2021–22	Championnat National 3	8	0	—		—		8	0
Troyes II	2022–23	Championnat National 3	7	0	—		—		7	0
Troyes II	2023–24	Championnat National 3	1	0	—		—		1	0
Troyes II	Total		16	0	—		—		16	0
Troyes	2021–22	Ligue 1	4	0	0	0	—		4	0
Troyes	2022–23	Ligue 1	8	0	1	0	—		9	0
Troyes	2023–24	Ligue 1	31	1	1	0	—		32	1
Troyes	Total		43	1	2	0	—		45	1
Young Boys	2024–25	Swiss Super League	14	0	3	0	5 (Note: Appearances in UEFA Champions League)	0	22	0
Young Boys	2025–26	Swiss Super League	15	0	1	0	8 (Note: Appearances in UEFA Europa League)	0	24	0
Young Boys	Total		29	0	4	0	13	0	46	0
Career total			88	1	6	0	13	0	107	1
