= Danijela Ilić =

Yugoslavian and Serbian basketball player

Personal information
- Born: August 20, 1970 (age 56) Niš, SFR Yugoslavia
- Listed height: 1.70 m (5 ft 7 in)

Career information
- Playing career: –2005
- Position: Shooting guard

Career history

Playing
- 1997–1998: Ježica
- 2004–2005: Dubočica Leskovac

Coaching
- 2010–2011: Student Niš
Medals
Women's basketball
Representing Yugoslavia
FIBA World Championship
Silver medal – second place	1990 Kuala Lumpur	Team competition

Danijela Ilić (Serbian Cyrillic: Данијела Илић, born August 20, 1970, in Niš, SFR Yugoslavia) is a former Yugoslavian and Serbian female basketball player.

== Personal life ==
Ilić has two sons, Luka (born 1999) and Ivan (born 2001), who are professional footballers. Both sons are playing for Red Star Belgrade, on loan from Manchester City.
