= Mama Baldé =

Bissau-Guinean footballer (born 1995)

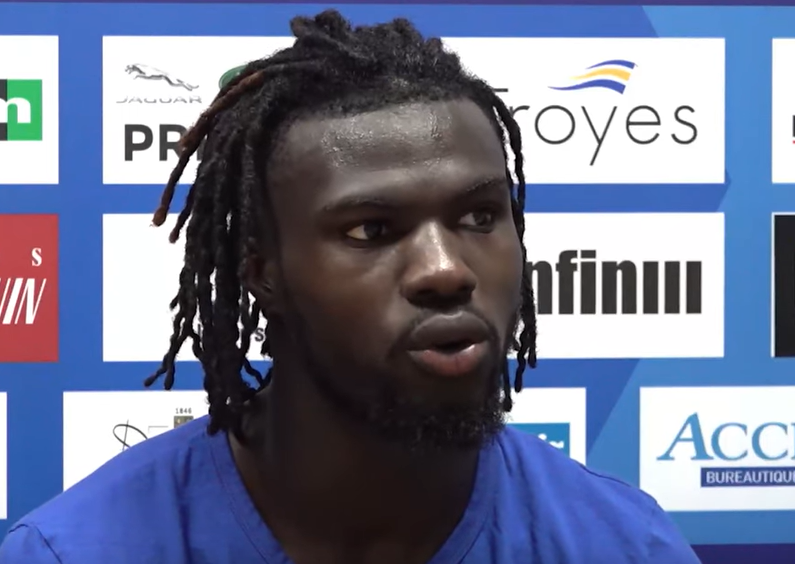
- Baldé in 2021

Personal information
- Full name: Mama Samba Baldé
- Date of birth: 6 November 1995 (age 31)
- Place of birth: Bissau, Guinea-Bissau
- Height: 1.76 m (5 ft 9 in)
- Positions: Winger; right-back

Team information
- Current team: Brest
- Number: 17

Youth career
- 2006–2007: Recreios Algueirão
- 2007–2013: Sintrense
- 2013–2014: Sporting CP

Senior career*
Years	Team	Apps	(Gls)
2013	Sintrense	1	(0)
2014−2019	Sporting CP B	58	(1)
2015	→ Benfica Castelo Branco (loan)	9	(1)
2017–2019	→ Aves (loan)	41	(11)
2019−2021	Dijon	53	(13)
2021−2024	Troyes	64	(15)
2022–2024	Troyes B	1	(0)
2023−2024	→ Lyon (loan)	20	(2)
2024	Lyon	2	(0)
2024–	Brest	54	(6)

International career^{‡}
2019–	Guinea-Bissau	41	(10)
- * Club domestic league appearances and goals as of 18:08, 8 November 2026 (UTC) ‡ National team caps and goals as of 17:37, 17 November 2026 (UTC)

Mama Samba Baldé (born 6 November 1995) is a Bissau-Guinean professional footballer who plays as a winger for Ligue 1 club Brest and the Guinea-Bissau national team.

== Club career ==
=== Sporting CP ===
Born in Bissau, Baldé moved to Portugal before his tenth birthday. In 2013, he signed with Sporting CP for his last year as a junior, arriving for free from Sintrense.

Baldé made his professional debut with the reserves on 11 May 2014, coming on as a 75th-minute substitute in a 1–0 away win against Braga B in the Segunda Liga. In January 2015, he was loaned to third division side Benfica de Castelo Branco until June.

Returned to Sporting B for 2015–16, Baldé scored his first league goal on 30 September 2015, but in a 1–3 home defeat to Olhanense. He totalled 38 appearances during the season, helping to a tenth-place finish in the second tier.

Baldé went on loan to Primeira Liga club Aves in the summer of 2017. His first match in the competition occurred on 11 September, when he started as a right-back in the 2–1 home victory over Belenenses.

In February 2019, Baldé became Aves' all-time scorer in the Portuguese top flight with nine goals.

=== Dijon ===
On 27 June 2019, Baldé joined Dijon on a three-year contract. He made his Ligue 1 debut on 10 August, playing the first half of a 1–2 home loss against Saint-Étienne.

Baldé scored seven times during the 2020–21 campaign, but his team suffered relegation as last.

=== Troyes ===
On 31 July 2021, Baldé agreed to a four-year deal at Troyes in the same country and league. He scored a career-best 12 goals in 2022–23, but his side also went down.

=== Lyon ===
On 30 August 2023, Baldé joined Lyon on loan for one year for €2 million, with a €6 million buying option. In May 2024, as he had taken part in 55% of their matches, the clause was automatically activated.

=== Brest ===
On 30 August 2024, Baldé signed a three-year contract with fellow top-tier Brest for €4.5 million, not including bonuses potentially rising up to €2.4 million, with a 15% sell-on clause for Lyon. He was part of the squad that participated in European competitions for the first time in the club's history, the 2024–25 UEFA Champions League.

== International career ==
Baldé won his first cap for Guinea-Bissau on 8 June 2019, in a friendly against Angola where he replaced Toni Silva (2–0 loss in Penafiel). He was selected in the squad for the 2019 Africa Cup of Nations tournament.

== Career statistics ==
=== Club ===
As of match played 8 November 2026

Appearances and goals by club, season and competition
Club	Season	League			National cup (Note: Includes Taça de Portugal, Coupe de France)		League cup (Note: Includes Taça da Liga)		Europe		Other		Total	
Club	Season	Division	Apps	Goals	Apps	Goals	Apps	Goals	Apps	Goals	Apps	Goals	Apps	Goals
Sporting CP B	2013–14	Segunda Liga	1	0	—		—		—		—		1	0
Sporting CP B	2014–15	Segunda Liga	2	0	—		—		—		—		2	0
Sporting CP B	2015–16	Segunda Liga	38	1	—		—		—		—		38	1
Sporting CP B	2016–17	LigaPro	17	0	—		—		—		—		17	0
Sporting CP B	Total		58	1	—		—		—		—		58	1
Aves	2017–18	Primeira Liga	13	3	3	0	1	0	—		—		17	3
Aves	2018–19	Primeira Liga	28	8	3	1	3	1	—		1 (Note: Appearance in Supertaça Cândido de Oliveira)	0	35	10
Aves	Total		41	11	6	1	4	1	—		1	0	52	13
Dijon	2019–20	Ligue 1	24	6	3	0	1	0	—		—		28	6
Dijon	2020–21	Ligue 1	29	7	0	0	—		—		—		29	7
Dijon	Total		53	13	3	0	1	0	—		—		57	13
Troyes	2021–22	Ligue 1	30	3	0	0	—		—		—		30	3
Troyes	2022–23	Ligue 1	34	12	1	0	—		—		—		35	12
Troyes	Total		64	15	1	0	—		—		—		65	15
Troyes B	2021–22	Championnat National 3	1	0	—		—		—		—		1	0
Lyon (loan)	2023–24	Ligue 1	20	2	3	0	—		—		—		23	2
Lyon	2024–25	Ligue 1	2	0	—		—		—		—		2	0
Lyon	Lyon total		22	2	3	0	—		—		—		25	2
Brest	2024–25	Ligue 1	27	2	4	0	—		9 (Note: Appearances in UEFA Champions League)	0	—		40	2
Brest	2025–26	Ligue 1	18	2	1	0	—		—		—		19	2
Brest	2026–27	Ligue 1	9	2	0	0	—		—		—		9	2
Brest	Total		54	6	5	0	—		9	0	—		68	6
Career total			293	48	18	1	5	1	9	0	1	0	326	50

=== International ===
As of match played 17 November 2026

Appearances and goals by national team and year
National team	Year	Apps	Goals
Guinea-Bissau	2019	7	0
Guinea-Bissau	2020	3	0
Guinea-Bissau	2021	3	1
Guinea-Bissau	2022	4	0
Guinea-Bissau	2023	5	2
Guinea-Bissau	2024	13	3
Guinea-Bissau	2025	2	1
Guinea-Bissau	2026	4	3
Total		41	10

As of match played 17 November 2026. Scores and results list Guinea-Bissau's goal tally first.

List of international goals scored by Mama Baldé
No.	Date	Venue	Opponent	Score	Result	Competition
1	7 September 2021	Al-Hilal Stadium, Omdurman, Sudan	Sudan	4–1	4–2	2022 FIFA World Cup qualification
2	24 March 2023	Moshood Abiola National Stadium, Abuja, Nigeria	Nigeria	1–0	1–0	2023 Africa Cup of Nations qualification
3	17 November 2023	Marrakesh Stadium, Marrakesh, Morocco	Burkina Faso	1–0	1–1	2026 FIFA World Cup qualification
4	6 January 2024	26 March Stadium, Bamako, Mali	Mali	1–2	2–6	Friendly
5	10 June 2024	24 September Stadium, Bissau, Guinea-Bissau	Egypt	1–0	1–1	2026 FIFA World Cup qualification
6	10 September 2024	Zimpeto Stadium, Maputo, Mozambique	Mozambique	1–1	1–2	2025 Africa Cup of Nations qualification
7	4 September 2025	24 September Stadium, Bissau, Guinea-Bissau	Sierra Leone	1–1	1–1	2026 FIFA World Cup qualification
8	25 September 2026	Amaan Stadium, Zanzibar City, Tanzania	Tanzania	2–0	2–0	2027 Africa Cup of Nations qualification
9	29 September 2026	24 September Stadium, Bissau, Guinea-Bissau	Nigeria	2–0	3–0	2027 Africa Cup of Nations qualification
10	17 November 2026	24 September Stadium, Bissau, Guinea-Bissau	Madagascar	1–0	2–0	2027 Africa Cup of Nations qualification

== Honours ==
Aves

- Taça de Portugal: 2017–18

Lyon

- Coupe de France runner-up: 2023–24
