= Alexis Tibidi (footballer, born 2003) =

French footballer

Personal information
- Full name: Alexis Ronaldo Tibidi
- Date of birth: 3 November 2003 (age 23)
- Place of birth: Lille, France
- Height: 1.87 m (6 ft 2 in)
- Position: Forward

Youth career
- 2010–2018: ESA Brive
- 2018–2021: Toulouse
- 2024: → Manchester City (loan)

Senior career*
Years	Team	Apps	(Gls)
2021–2022	VfB Stuttgart II	3	(0)
2021–2023	VfB Stuttgart	13	(0)
2022–2023	→ Rheindorf Altach (loan)	16	(5)
2023–2024	Troyes	3	(0)
2023	→ NEC Nijmegen (loan)	0	(0)
2024–2025	LASK	4	(0)

International career
2019–2020	France U17	3	(0)
2022–2023	France U20	4	(1)
- * Club domestic league appearances and goals as of 23 May 2025

Alexis Ronaldo Tibidi (born 3 November 2003) is a French professional footballer who plays as a forward.

== Career ==
A youth product of the French clubs ESA Brive and Toulouse, Tibidi signed his first professional contract with Stuttgart on 19 July 2021. He made his senior debut with Stuttgart in a 2–1 Bundesliga loss to Borussia Dortmund on 20 November 2021.

On 11 July 2022, Tibidi moved on loan to Rheindorf Altach in Austria for the 2022–23 season.

On 28 January 2023, Tibidi returned to France and signed a contract with Troyes until 30 June 2027.

On 10 July 2024, Tibidi joined Austrian Bundesliga side LASK on a four-year contract. His contract with LASK was mutually terminated on 16 July 2025.

== International career ==
Tibidi was called up to the France U20s for the 2023 FIFA U-20 World Cup.

== Personal life ==
Tibidi is the son of the former Cameroon international footballer, Alexis Tibidi Sr. He is a practitioner of karate, and was the French national Karate champion in 2017. He holds both French and Cameroonian nationalities.

== Career statistics ==
As of match played 27 August 2023

Appearances and goals by club, season and competition
Club	Season	League			Cup		Europe		Other		Total	
Club	Season	Division	Apps	Goals	Apps	Goals	Apps	Goals	Apps	Goals	Apps	Goals
Stuttgart II	2021–22	Regionalliga Südwest	3	0	—		—		—		3	0
VfB Stuttgart	2021–22	Bundesliga	13	0	—		—		—		13	0
Rheindof Altach (loan)	2022–23	Austrian Bundesliga	16	5	2	0	—		—		18	5
Troyes	2022–23	Ligue 1	3	0	—		—		—		3	0
Troyes B	2022–23	National 3	2	0	—		—		—		2	0
Troyes B	2023–24	National 3	1	0	—		—		—		1	0
Troyes B	Total		3	0	—		—		—		3	0
Nijmegen (loan)	2023–24	Eredivisie	0	0	0	0	—		—		0	0
Career total			38	5	2	0	0	0	0	0	40	5
