= Jackson Porozo =

Ecuadorian footballer (born 2000)

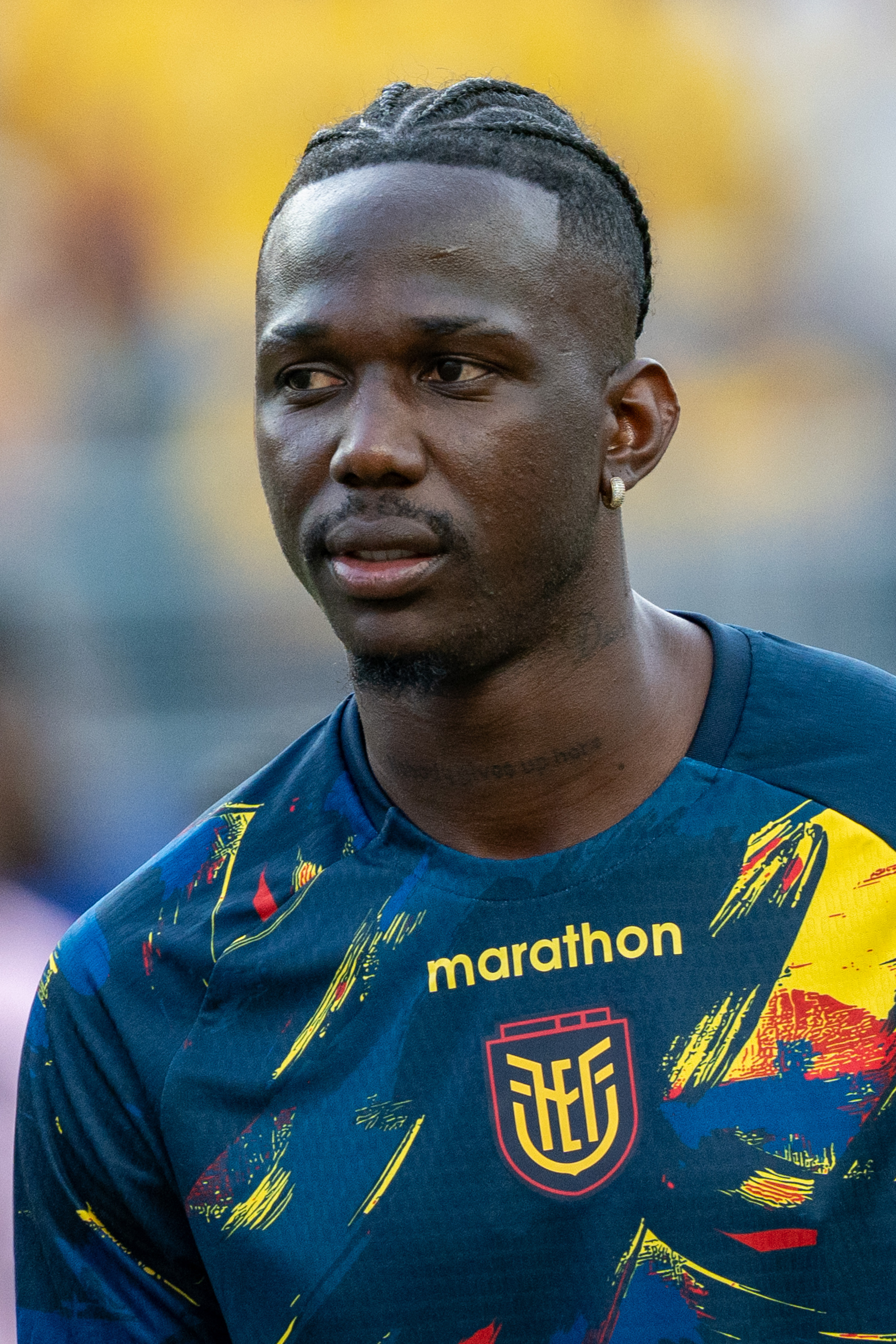
- Porozo with Ecuador in 2026

Personal information
- Full name: Jackson Gabriel Porozo Vernaza
- Date of birth: 4 August 2000 (age 26)
- Place of birth: San Lorenzo, Ecuador
- Height: 1.93 m (6 ft 4 in)
- Position: Centre-back

Team information
- Current team: Tijuana
- Number: 12

Youth career
- 2012–2014: LDU Quito
- 2014–2015: Sandino
- 2014: → Manta (loan)
- 2015: → Manta (loan)
- 2015–2016: Independiente del Valle
- 2016–2017: Manta
- 2018–2020: Santos

Senior career*
Years	Team	Apps	(Gls)
2017–2018	Manta	18	(1)
2020–2022	Boavista	35	(2)
2022–2025	Troyes	22	(2)
2023–2024	→ Olympiacos (loan)	4	(0)
2024	→ Kasımpaşa (loan)	14	(1)
2024	→ Leganés (loan)	0	(0)
2025	→ Tijuana (loan)	32	(2)
2026–	Tijuana	24	(0)

International career^{‡}
2017	Ecuador U17	8	(1)
2019	Ecuador U20	15	(0)
2019–	Ecuador U23	6	(0)
2019–	Ecuador	13	(1)
Medal record
Men's football
Representing Ecuador
FIFA U-20 World Cup
Third place	2019 Poland
- * Club domestic league appearances and goals as of 20 September 2026 ‡ National team caps and goals as of 21:10, 1 October 2026 (UTC)

Jackson Gabriel Porozo Vernaza (born 4 August 2000) is an Ecuadorian professional footballer who plays as a centre-back for Liga MX club Tijuana and the Ecuador national team.

== Club career ==
=== Early career ===
Born in San Lorenzo, Esmeraldas, Porozo started his career with LDU Quito, joining their youth setup in 2012. He subsequently represented Sandino FC, Manta and Independiente del Valle before returning to Manta in 2016. Porozo made his senior debut during the 2017 campaign, in the Ecuadorian Serie B. He scored his first senior goal on 22 April of that year, netting his team's only in a 3–1 away loss against Colón FC. Porozo finished his first season with one goal in 16 appearances, and also had a trial at Palmeiras in December 2017.

=== Santos ===
On 23 March 2018, Porozo agreed to a contract with Santos, being initially assigned to the under-20 squad. After having problems in his contract, he joined the club in August, after his 18th birthday.

=== Boavista ===
On 1 October 2020, Porozo was announced at Primeira Liga side Boavista, agreeing to a five-year contract, for a total fee of €500,000; Santos received 80% of the value, and also retained a 16% over a future sale.

=== Troyes ===
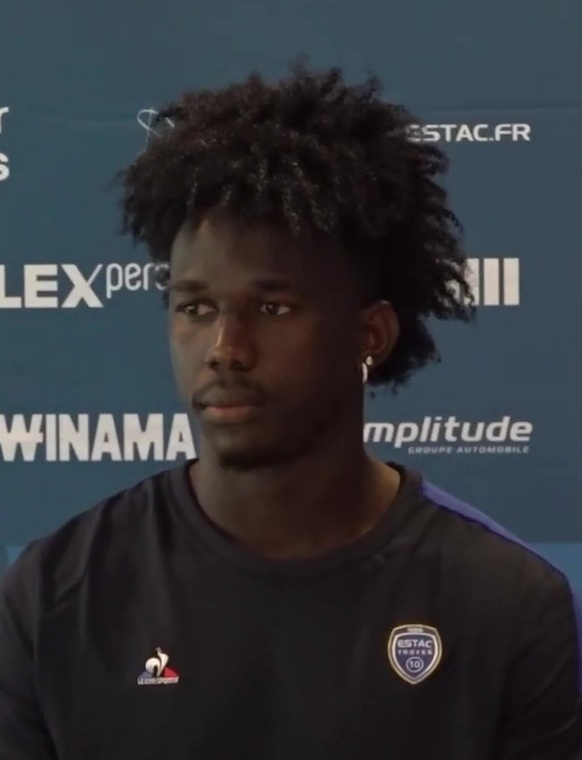
Porozo with Troyes in 2022

On 24 June 2022, Porozo signed for Ligue 1 side Troyes on a five-year contract. On 2 August 2023, he was loaned to Super League Greece side Olympiacos.

On 2 February 2024, Porozo moved on a new loan to Kasımpaşa in Turkey. On 23 August, he switched teams and countries again, after agreeing to a one-year loan deal with La Liga side Leganés. He made two cup appearances and no league appearances for Leganés in the first half of the season.

=== Tijuana ===
On 30 January 2025, Porozo moved on a new loan to Tijuana in Mexico until 31 December 2025. He scored his first goal for the club on 3 August 2025, netting in a 2–1 Leagues Cup win over the Colorado Rapids. Porozo scored his first Liga MX goal the following month, netting the equalizer in a 1–1 draw against Atlético San Luis on 15 September. He scored again in his next match, a 5–0 win over Club León five days later. On 9 January 2026, the transfer to Tijuana was made permanent.

== International career ==
=== Youth ===
On 14 February 2017, Porozo was called up to Ecuador national under-17 team for the year's South American U-17 Championship. He was a starter during the tournament and scored a goal in a 1–0 victory against Uruguay on 26 February.

On 2 January 2019, Porozo was included in Jorge Célico's 23-man list of the national under-20 team for the 2019 South American U-20 Championship. He was an undisputed starter during the competition, and was included in the tournament's best eleven as his side was crowned champions. Porozo went on to help the team finish in third place at the 2019 FIFA U-20 World Cup.

Later that year, Porozo was called up to the national under-23 team for the 2019 Pan American Games, joining the squad as a late addition.

=== Senior ===
On 12 March 2019, Porozo was called up to the senior national team for friendlies against the United States and Honduras.

Porozo made his full international debut on 10 September 2019, coming on as a late substitute for Félix Torres in a 3–0 win against Bolivia in Cuenca.

Porozo was named in the Ecuadorian squad for the 2022 FIFA World Cup.

Porozo was called up to the final 26-man Ecuador squad for the 2024 Copa América.

On 31 May 2026, Porozo was selected in the 26-man squad for the 2026 FIFA World Cup.

== Career statistics ==
=== Club ===
As of match played on 20 September 2026

Appearances and goals by club, season and competition
Club	Season	League			National cup		League cup		Continental		Other		Total	
Club	Season	Division	Apps	Goals	Apps	Goals	Apps	Goals	Apps	Goals	Apps	Goals	Apps	Goals
Manta	2017	Serie B	10	1	—		—		—		—		10	1
Manta	2018	Serie B	8	0	—		—		—		—		8	0
Manta	Total		18	1	—		—		—		—		18	1
Boavista	2020–21	Primeira Liga	11	2	1	0	0	0	0	0	—		12	2
Boavista	2021–22	Primeira Liga	24	0	0	0	4	0	0	0	—		28	0
Boavista	Total		35	2	1	0	4	0	0	0	—		40	2
Troyes	2022–23	Ligue 1	22	2	1	0	—		—		—		23	2
Olympiacos (Ioan)	2023–24	Super League Greece	4	0	0	0	—		5	0	—		9	0
Kasımpaşa (Ioan)	2023–24	Süper Lig	14	1	—		—		—		—		14	1
Leganés (loan)	2024–25	La Liga	—		2	0	—		—		—		2	0
Tijuana (loan)	2024–25	Liga MX	13	0	—		—		—		—		13	0
Tijuana (loan)	2025–26	Liga MX	19	2	—		—		—		2 (Note: Appearances in Leagues Cup)	1	17	1
Tijuana (loan)	Total		32	2	—		—		—		2	1	34	3
Tijuana	2025–26	Liga MX	16	0	—		—		—		—		16	0
Tijuana	2026–27	Liga MX	8	0	—		—		—		3	0	11	0
Tijuana	Total		24	0	—		—		—		3	0	27	0
Career total			132	6	4	0	4	0	5	0	5	1	150	7

=== International ===
As of 1 October 2026

Ecuador
Year	Apps	Goals
2019	1	0
2021	1	0
2022	5	0
2024	1	0
2026	5	1
Total	13	1

Scores and results list Ecuador's goal tally first, score column indicates score after each Porozo goal.

List of international goals scored by Jackson Porozo
No.	Date	Venue	Opponent	Score	Result	Competition
1	31 May 2026	Sports Illustrated Stadium, Harrison, New Jersey, United States	Saudi Arabia	1–0	2–1	Friendly

== Honours ==
Ecuador U20

- South American U-20 Championship: 2019

Individual

- South American U-20 Championship Best XI: 2019
