= Yasser Larouci =

Algerian footballer (born 2001)

Yasser Larouci ياسر لعروسي
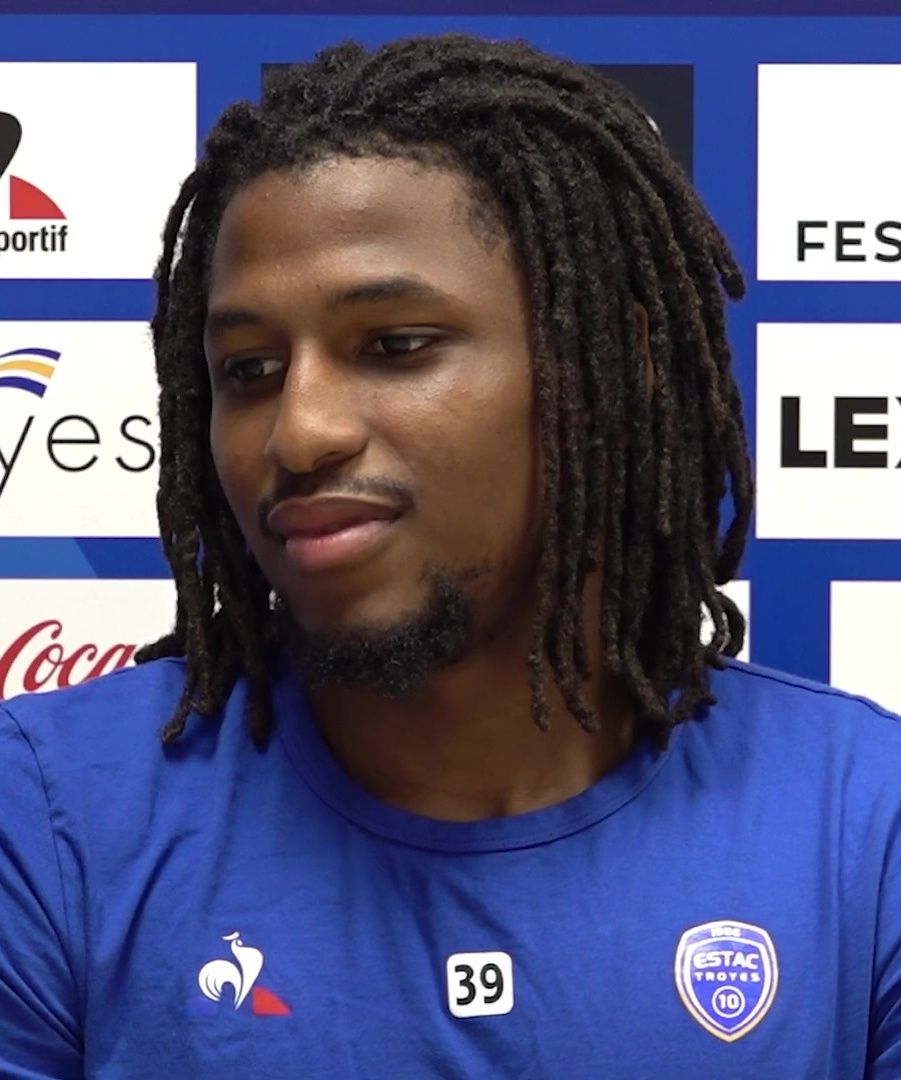
- Larouci in 2022

Personal information
- Full name: Yasser Larouci
- Date of birth: 1 January 2001 (age 25)
- Place of birth: El Oued, Algeria
- Height: 1.76 m (5 ft 9 in)
- Positions: Left-back; left wing-back

Team information
- Current team: Le Mans
- Number: 76

Youth career
- 2007–2011: Madrillet Château Blanc
- 2011–2017: Le Havre
- 2017–2021: Liverpool

Senior career*
Years	Team	Apps	(Gls)
2019–2021	Liverpool	0	(0)
2021–2026	Troyes	42	(1)
2023–2024	→ Sheffield United (loan)	11	(0)
2024–2025	→ Watford (loan)	39	(0)
2025–2026	→ A.E. Kifisia (loan)	26	(3)
2026–	Le Mans	3	(0)

International career^{‡}
2022–2023	France U21	6	(1)
2023	Algeria	2	(0)
- * Club domestic league appearances and goals as of 22 May 2026 ‡ National team caps and goals as of 17 October 2023

Yasser Larouci (Arabic: ياسر لعروسي; born 1 January 2001) is an Algerian professional footballer who plays as a left-back or left wing-back for Ligue 1 club Le Mans and the Algeria national team.

== Club career ==
=== Youth ===
Larouci was a player rated at Le Havre, where he was the captain of their U17 side. He rejected their contract extension and subsequently became a free agent and was targeted by many top European teams.

Larouci was transferred to Liverpool after receiving international clearance in November 2017, and has subsequently represented the club at U18 and U21 level. U18 Coach described him as "aggressive and "lightning quick". Initially trained as a winger, he was converted to an attacking full back. In his new position, Larouci helped Liverpool win a fourth FA Youth Cup in 2019, after defeating Manchester City on penalties in the final.

=== Liverpool ===
Larouci started training with the first team in the summer of 2019. He made his non-competitive debut for the Liverpool first team in July 2019, in a friendly against Tranmere Rovers, which Liverpool won 6–0. He was subsequently included in their pre-season tour starting at left back against 3–1 Bradford City, 2–3 Borussia Dortmund, and 1–2 Sevilla, where he was stretchered off after a challenge by Joris Gnagnon, which led to the Sevilla player being red-carded.

He made his first team debut for Liverpool on 5 January 2020, in an FA Cup third round match against Everton, after James Milner's early injury.

Larouci was released at the end of the 2020–21 season.

=== Troyes ===
On 26 July 2021, he joined Troyes. He made his debut in October 2021, in a 2–0 defeat to Nantes.

==== Sheffield United (loan) ====
On 17 July 2023, following Troyes' relegation to Ligue 2, Larouci joined newly promoted Premier League club Sheffield United on a season-long loan, with an option to buy.

=== Le Mans ===
On 14 July 2026, Larouci joined Le Mans as a free agent.

== International career ==
Larouci holds dual nationality between Algeria and France, and is eligible to represent either nation. He made his debut for the France national under-21 football team in March 2022, scoring against Northern Ireland on his first appearance.

In September 2023, Algerian national coach Djamel Belmadi announced that Larouci would represent the Algerian national team, starting from the 2026 World Cup qualification in November that year.

In December 2023, he was named in Algeria's squad for the 2023 Africa Cup of Nations.

== Career statistics ==
As of match played 3 May 2025

Appearances and goals by club, season and competition
Club	Season	League			National cup (Note: Includes Coupe de France, FA Cup)		League cup (Note: Includes EFL Cup)		Other		Total	
Club	Season	League	Apps	Goals	Apps	Goals	Apps	Goals	Apps	Goals	Apps	Goals
Liverpool	2019–20	Premier League	0	0	2	0	0	0	0 (Note: Appearances for U21 team in EFL Trophy)	0	2	0
Liverpool	2020–21	Premier League	0	0	0	0	0	0	0	0	0	0
Liverpool	Total		0	0	2	0	0	0	0	0	2	0
Troyes II	2021–22	National 3	3	0	0	0	–		0	0	3	0
Troyes	2021–22	Ligue 1	12	0	1	0	–		0	0	13	0
Troyes	2022–23	Ligue 1	30	1	1	0	–		0	0	31	1
Troyes	Total		42	1	2	0	–		0	0	44	1
Sheffield United (loan)	2023–24	Premier League	11	0	1	0	1	0	0	0	13	0
Watford (loan)	2024–25	Championship	39	0	1	0	2	0	0	0	42	0
Career total			92	1	6	0	3	0	0	0	100	1

== Honours ==
Liverpool U18

- FA Youth Cup: 2018–19
