= Eric N'Jo =

French association footballer (born 2004)

Personal information
- Date of birth: 1 June 2004 (age 22)
- Place of birth: Sens, France
- Height: 1.87 m (6 ft 2 in)
- Position: Centre-back

Team information
- Current team: RFC Liège
- Number: 16

Youth career
- 2017–2022: Troyes

Senior career*
| Years | Team | Apps | (Gls) |
| 2022–2024 | Troyes II | 37 | (1) |
| 2022–2024 | Troyes | 4 | (0) |
| 2004–2025 | Virton | 26 | (3) |
| 2025– | RFC Liège | 13 | (0) |
- * Club domestic league appearances and goals as of 19 April 2026

Eric N'Jo (born 1 June 2004) is a French professional footballer who plays as a centre-back for RFC Liège in the Challenger Pro League.

== Career ==
N'Jo moved to the youth academy of Troyes in 2017, and was promoted to their reserves in 2022. He made his professional debut with Troyes in a 1–0 Ligue 1 loss to Nice on 24 August 2022, coming on as a substitute in the 71st minute. On 9 June 2022, he signed a professional contract with the club, signing a 3-year agreement.

== Personal life ==
Born in France, N'Jo is of Cameroonian descent.
