= Alexis Lefebvre =

French footballer (born 2003)

Personal information
- Date of birth: 21 May 2003 (age 23)
- Place of birth: Vernon, France
- Height: 1.66 m (5 ft 5 in)
- Position: Winger

Team information
- Current team: Pau
- Number: 11

Youth career
- Pacy
- 2018–2020: Troyes

Senior career*
Years	Team	Apps	(Gls)
2020–2024	Troyes II	25	(13)
2021–2024	Troyes	9	(1)
2023	→ Nancy (loan)	14	(1)
2024	→ Nancy (loan)	9	(2)
2024–2026	RFC Liège	50	(8)
2026–	Pau	0	(0)
- * Club domestic league appearances and goals as of 17 April 2026

Alexis Lefebvre (born 21 May 2003) is a French professional footballer who plays as a winger for Ligue 2 club Pau.

== Career ==
A youth product of Pacy, Lefebvre signed with Troyes on 4 December 2018. He made his professional debut with Troyes in a 1–0 Coupe de France loss to Auxerre on 19 January 2021.

On 31 January 2023, Lefebvre was loaned by Nancy.

On 20 August 2024, Lefebvre signed a three-year contract with RFC Liège in Belgium.
