= Ryan Fage =

French footballer (born 2003)

Personal information
- Date of birth: 31 October 2003 (age 23)
- Place of birth: Ivry-sur-Seine, France
- Height: 1.69 m (5 ft 7 in)
- Position: Midfielder

Team information
- Current team: RKC Waalwijk
- Number: 12

Youth career
- 2016–2022: Troyes

Senior career*
Years	Team	Apps	(Gls)
2020–2025	Troyes II	60	(18)
2023–2024	Troyes	4	(0)
2023–2024	→ Avranches (loan)	14	(0)
2025	Paris 13 Atletico	18	(4)
2026–	RKC Waalwijk	11	(3)
- * Club domestic league appearances and goals as of 25 April 2026

Ryan Fage (born 31 October 2003) is a French professional footballer who plays as a midfielder for Dutch Eerste Divisie club RKC Waalwijk.

== Career ==
Fage is a youth product of Troyes since the U14s. Fage made his professional debut with Troyes in a 1–0 Coupe de France loss to Auxerre on 19 January 2021. On 20 January 2022, he signed his first professional contract with Troyes.

On 2 February 2026, Fage joined Dutch Eerste Divisie side RKC Waalwijk on a two-and-a-half year contract.
