= Danel Dongmo =

French association footballer

Personal information
- Full name: Danel Jordan Dongmo
- Date of birth: 31 January 2001 (age 25)
- Place of birth: Douala, Cameroon
- Height: 1.82 m (6 ft 0 in)
- Position: Midfielder

Team information
- Current team: Nacional
- Number: 31

Youth career
- 2014–2018: Brasseries du Cameroun
- 2018–2020: Troyes

Senior career*
Years	Team	Apps	(Gls)
2020–2024	Troyes B	57	(9)
2023–2024	Troyes	3	(0)
2024–2025	Vardar	30	(0)
2025–2026	Petrolul Ploiești	27	(0)
2026–	Nacional	6	(0)

International career
2022	Cameroon U23	1	(0)
- * Club domestic league appearances and goals as of 18 May 2026

Danel Jordan Dongmo (born 31 January 2001) is a Cameroonian professional footballer who plays as a midfielder for Primeira Liga club Nacional.

Dongmo is of mixed Cameroonian-Ugandan heritage; His father Dongomo Fidele was born to a Ugandan mother Kafuko Yuliana.

== Career ==
A youth product of the Cameroonian football academy, Ecole de Football des Brasseries du Cameroun, Dongmo moved to the youth side of Troyes in 2018 and their reserves in 2020. On 22 June 2022, he signed a professional contract with Troyes until 2024. He made his professional debut with Troyes as a late substitute in a 2–0 Coupe de France loss to Lille on 8 January 2022.

== International career ==
Dongmo was called up to the Cameroon U23s for a set of friendlies in October 2022.

Dangomo is eligible to play for both Uganda and Cameroon

== Honours ==
Vardar

- Macedonian Cup: 2024–25
