= 2022–23 VfB Stuttgart season =

VfB Stuttgart
2022–23 season
- President: Claus Vogt
- Chairman: Alexander Wehrle
- Head coach: Pellegrino Matarazzo (until 10 October); Michael Wimmer (caretaker, from 10 October to 5 December); Bruno Labbadia (from 5 December to 3 April); Sebastian Hoeneß (from 3 April)
- Stadium: Mercedes-Benz Arena
- Bundesliga: 16th (play-off winners)
- DFB-Pokal: Semi-finals
- Top goalscorer: League: Serhou Guirassy (11); All: Serhou Guirassy (14)
- Highest home attendance: 47,500 (various)
- Biggest win: 6–0 vs Arminia Bielefeld
- Biggest defeat: 0–5 vs Borussia Dortmund
Home colours	Away colours	Third colours

The 2022–23 season was the 130th season in the existence of VfB Stuttgart and the club's third consecutive season in the top flight of German football. In addition to the domestic league, VfB Stuttgart participated in this season's edition of the DFB-Pokal. The season covers the period from 1 July 2022 to 30 June 2023.

== Players ==
=== First-team squad ===
As of 31 January 2023

Note: Flags indicate national team as defined under FIFA eligibility rules; some limited exceptions apply. Players may hold more than one non-FIFA nationality.

No.	Pos.	Nation	Player
1	GK	GER	Florian Müller
2	DF	GER	Waldemar Anton (vice-captain)
3	MF	JPN	Wataru Endo (captain)
4	DF	GER	Josha Vagnoman
5	DF	GRE	Konstantinos Mavropanos
7	MF	FRA	Tanguy Coulibaly
8	MF	FRA	Enzo Millot
9	FW	GUI	Serhou Guirassy (on loan from Rennes)
10	FW	POR	Tiago Tomás (on loan from Sporting CP)
11	FW	COL	Juan José Perea
14	FW	COD	Silas Katompa Mvumpa
15	DF	GER	Pascal Stenzel
16	MF	GER	Atakan Karazor
17	MF	JPN	Genki Haraguchi
20	FW	GER	Luca Pfeiffer
21	DF	JPN	Hiroki Itō

No.	Pos.	Nation	Player
22	MF	GER	Chris Führich
23	DF	FRA	Dan-Axel Zagadou
24	DF	CRO	Borna Sosa
25	MF	GER	Lilian Egloff
27	FW	AUS	Alou Kuol
28	MF	DEN	Nikolas Nartey
31	FW	POR	Gil Dias
33	GK	GER	Fabian Bredlow
34	MF	TUR	Ömer Faruk Beyaz
36	MF	GER	Laurin Ulrich
37	DF	GER	Antonis Aidonis
39	FW	GRE	Thomas Kastanaras
42	GK	GER	Florian Schock

=== Out on loan ===
Note: Flags indicate national team as defined under FIFA eligibility rules; some limited exceptions apply. Players may hold more than one non-FIFA nationality.

No.	Pos.	Nation	Player
—	MF	ENG	Clinton Mola (at (England) Blackburn Rovers until June 2023)
—	MF	GER	Roberto Massimo (at (Portugal) Académico Viseu until June 2023)
—	FW	GUI	Momo Cissé (at (Poland) Wisła Kraków until June 2023)

No.	Pos.	Nation	Player
—	MF	GER	Mateo Klimowicz (at (Mexico) San Luis until December 2023)
—	FW	NED	Mohamed Sankoh (at (Netherlands) Vitesse until June 2023)
—	FW	DEN	Wahid Faghir (at (Denmark) Nordsjælland until June 2023)

== Transfers ==
=== In ===
No.	Pos.	Player	Transferred from	Fee	Date	Source
5	DF	Konstantinos Mavropanos (GRE)	Arsenal (ENG)	€3,200,000	1 July 2022	
21	DF	Hiroki Itō (JPN)	Júbilo Iwata (JPN)	€600,000	1 July 2022	
11	FW	Juan José Perea (COL)	PAS Giannina (GRE)	€2,400,000	8 July 2022	
4	DF	Josha Vagnoman (GER)	Hamburger SV (GER)	€3,700,000	9 July 2022	
20	FW	Luca Pfeiffer (GER)	Midtjylland (DEN)	€2,850,000	2 August 2022	
9	FW	Serhou Guirassy (GUI)	Rennes (FRA)	Loan	1 September 2022	
23	DF	Dan-Axel Zagadou (FRA)	Borussia Dortmund (GER)	Free	19 September 2022	
17	MF	Genki Haraguchi (JPN)	Union Berlin (GER)	€1,000,000	30 January 2023	
31	FW	Gil Dias (POR)	Benfica (POR)	Undisclosed	30 January 2023	

=== Out ===
No.	Pos.	Player	Transferred to	Fee	Date	Source
7	DF	Pablo Maffeo (ESP)	Mallorca (ESP)	€3,000,000	1 July 2022	
10	MF	Daniel Didavi (GER)	Unattached	Free	1 July 2022	
20	MF	Philipp Förster (GER)	VfL Bochum (GER)	€500,000	1 July 2022	
11	MF	Erik Thommy (GER)	Sporting Kansas City (USA)	Free	7 July 2022	
50	FW	Alexis Tibidi (FRA)	Rheindorf Altach (AUT)	Loan	11 July 2022	
30	MF	Roberto Massimo (GER)	Académico de Viseu (POR)	Loan	22 July 2022	
44	FW	Mohamed Sankoh (NED)	Vitesse (NED)	Loan	22 July 2022	
34	MF	Ömer Faruk Beyaz (TUR)	1. FC Magdeburg (GER)	Loan	27 July 2022	
23	MF	Orel Mangala (BEL)	Nottingham Forest (ENG)	€13,000,000	31 July 2022	
17	MF	Darko Churlinov (MKD)	Burnley (ENG)	€3,500,000	19 August 2022	
29	MF	Philipp Klement (GER)	1. FC Kaiserslautern (GER)	Undisclosed	25 August 2022	
–	DF	Jan-Carlo Simić (GER)	Milan (ITA)	€1,000,000	25 August 2022	
9	FW	Saša Kalajdžić (AUT)	Wolverhampton Wonderers (ENG)	€18,000,000	31 August 2022	
43	DF	Maxime Awoudja (GER)	Excelsior (NED)	Undisclosed	31 August 2022	
6	MF	Clinton Mola (ENG)	Blackburn Rovers (ENG)	Loan	1 September 2022	
19	FW	Wahid Faghir (DEN)	Nordsjælland (DEN)	Loan	1 September 2022	
31	MF	Mateo Klimowicz (GER)	Arminia Bielefeld (GER)	Loan	1 September 2022	
31	MF	Mateo Klimowicz (GER)	San Luis (MEX)	Loan	1 January 2023	
50	FW	Alexis Tibidi (FRA)	Troyes (FRA)	€2,600,000	28 January 2023	
32	MF	Naouirou Ahamada (FRA)	Crystal Palace (ENG)	€12,000,000	31 January 2023	

== Pre-season and friendlies ==
Win Draw Loss Fixtures

2 July 2022 Friendly	SV Böblingen	1–7	VfB Stuttgart	Böblingen, Germany
15:00 CEST (UTC+2)	Carneiro 75'	Report	Führich 16', 35'; Millot 25'; Kastanaras 38'; Kuol 71', 77', 84'	Stadium: SVB-Stadion; Attendance: 4,500

9 July 2022 Friendly	VfB Stuttgart	3–2	Zürich	Friedrichshafen, Germany
17:30 CEST (UTC+2)	Ahamada 58', 71'; Churlinov 69'	Report	Gnonto 28'; Conde 88'	Stadium: Zeppelinstadion

16 July 2022 Friendly	VfB Stuttgart	2–1	Brentford	Friedrichshafen, Germany
15:00 CEST (UTC+2)	Kastanaras 72'; Coulibaly 90+2' (pen.)	Report	Mbeumo 12'	Stadium: Zeppelinstadion; Attendance: 3,600; Referee: Robert Hartmann (Germany)

23 July 2022 Friendly	VfB Stuttgart	5–2	Valencia	Stuttgart, Germany
15:30 CEST (UTC+2)	Tomás 16', 44'; Silas 46'; Perea 58'; Churlinov 90'	Report	Marcos André 34', 55'; Cömert (yellow card) 48'; Correia (yellow card) 65'; Račić (yellow card) 74'	Stadium: Mercedes-Benz Arena; Referee: Martin Petersen (Germany)

24 August 2022 Friendly	VfB Stuttgart	3–0	St. Gallen	Stuttgart, Germany
15:00 CEST (UTC+2)	Nartey 11'; Pfeiffer 46'; Klement 83'	Report		Attendance: 1,000

22 September 2022 Friendly	VfB Stuttgart	2–1	Grasshopper	Stuttgart, Germany
15:00 CEST (UTC+2)	Ahamada 38'; Perea 82'	Report	Schmid 2'	Attendance: 0

19 November 2022 Friendly	1. FC Köln	2–4	VfB Stuttgart	Austin, United States
15:00 CST (UTC−6)	Schwirten 68'; Adamyan 84'		Mavropanos 14', 41'; Coulibaly 27', 31'	Stadium: Q2 Stadium; Referee: Samantha Martinez (United States)

16 December 2022 Friendly	VfB Stuttgart	0–3	Luzern	Stuttgart, Germany
15:00 CET (UTC+1)		Report	Abubakar 13'; Chader 54'; Klidjé 75'	Stadium: Mercedes-Benz Arena

8 January 2023 Friendly	Sion	0–3	VfB Stuttgart	Marbella, Spain
15:00 CET (UTC+1)		Report	Guirassy 46'; Nartey 55'; Kastanaras 90+1'

12 January 2023 Friendly	VfB Stuttgart	0–2	Sparta Prague	Benahavís, Spain
16:00 CET (UTC+1)			Anton 14' (o.g.); Haraslín 48'	Stadium: Campo La Quinta

24 March 2023 Friendly	VfB Stuttgart	2–0	1. FC Heidenheim	Stuttgart
14:00 CET (UTC+1)	Theuerkauf 49' (o.g.); Anton 55'			Stadium: Robert-Schlienz-Stadion

== Competitions ==
=== Overall record ===
Competition	First match	Last match	Starting round	Final position	Record							
Competition	First match	Last match	Starting round	Final position	Pld	W	D	L	GF	GA	GD	Win %
Bundesliga	7 August 2022	27 May 2023	Matchday 1	16th	34	7	12	15	45	57	−12	20.59
Bundesliga relegation play-offs	1 June 2023	5 June 2023	First leg	Winners	2	2	0	0	6	1	+5	100.00
DFB-Pokal	29 July 2022	3 May 2023	First round	Semi-finals	5	4	0	1	12	4	+8	80.00
Total					41	13	12	16	63	62	+1	31.71

Source: Soccerway

=== Bundesliga ===
==== League table ====
Pos	Team	Pld	W	D	L	GF	GA	GD	Pts	Qualification or relegation
14	VfL Bochum	34	10	5	19	40	72	−32	35	
15	FC Augsburg	34	9	7	18	42	63	−21	34	
16	VfB Stuttgart (O)	34	7	12	15	45	57	−12	33	Qualification for the relegation play-offs
17	Schalke 04 (R)	34	7	10	17	35	71	−36	31	Relegation to 2. Bundesliga
18	Hertha BSC (R)	34	7	8	19	42	69	−27	29	Relegation to 2. Bundesliga

Source: DFB
Rules for classification: 1) Points; 2) Goal difference; 3) Goals scored; 4) Head-to-head results; 5) Head-to-head away goals scored; 6) Away goals scored; 7) Play-off.
(O) Play-off winners; (R) Relegated

==== Results summary ====
Overall								Home						Away					
Pld	W	D	L	GF	GA	GD	Pts	W	D	L	GF	GA	GD	W	D	L	GF	GA	GD
34	7	12	15	45	57	−12	33	5	6	6	23	22	+1	2	6	9	22	35	−13

Source: DFB

==== Results by round ====
Round	1	2	3	4	5	6	7	8	9	10	11	12	13	14	15	16	17	18	19	20	21	22	23	24	25	26	27	28	29	30	31	32	33	34
Ground	H	A	H	A	H	A	H	A	H	H	A	H	A	H	A	H	A	A	H	A	H	A	H	A	H	A	A	H	A	H	A	H	A	H
Result	D	D	L	D	D	D	L	L	L	W	L	W	L	W	L	D	D	L	L	L	W	L	L	D	L	L	W	D	D	W	L	D	W	D
Position	10	11	12	12	12	14	16	16	17	14	16	15	16	15	16	16	15	15	16	17	14	15	15	16	18	18	16	16	16	15	16	17	15	16

Source: DFB
A = Away; H = Home; W = Win; D = Draw; L = Loss

==== Matches ====
The league fixtures were announced on 17 June 2022.

7 August 2022 1	VfB Stuttgart	1–1	RB Leipzig	Stuttgart
15:30 CEST (UTC+2)	Ahamada 31'; Silas (yellow card) 64'; Mola (yellow card) 90'	Report	Nkunku 8'; Sørloth (yellow card) 86'	Stadium: Mercedes-Benz Arena; Attendance: 46,000; Referee: Tobias Stieler

13 August 2022 2	Werder Bremen	2–2	VfB Stuttgart	Bremen
15:30 CEST (UTC+2)	Füllkrug 4'; Friedl (yellow card) 16'; Bittencourt (yellow card) 71'; Stark (yellow card) 83'; Ducksch (yellow card) 89'; Burke 90+5'	Report	Endo 38'; Kalajdžić (yellow card) 59'; Itō (yellow card) 71'; Silas 77'	Stadium: Weserstadion; Attendance: 41,000; Referee: Robert Hartmann

20 August 2022 3	VfB Stuttgart	0–1	SC Freiburg	Stuttgart
15:30 CEST (UTC+2)	Sosa (yellow card) 15'; Führich (yellow card) 28'; Ahamada (yellow card) 46'; Mavropanos (yellow card) 90+8'	Report	Grifo 11'; Sallai (yellow card) 28'; Keitel (yellow card) 84'	Stadium: Mercedes-Benz Arena; Attendance: 47,500; Referee: Felix Brych

28 August 2022 4	1. FC Köln	0–0	VfB Stuttgart	Cologne
15:30 CEST (UTC+2)	Kilian (yellow card) 58'; Ljubičić (yellow card) 87'	Report	Pfeiffer (red card) 56'; Karazor (yellow card) 79'; Millot (yellow card) 90+5'	Stadium: RheinEnergieStadion; Attendance: 50,000; Referee: Harm Osmers

3 September 2022 5	VfB Stuttgart	1–1	Schalke 04	Stuttgart
15:30 CEST (UTC+2)	Führich 18'; Vagnoman (yellow card) 45' (yellow-red card) 67'; Sosa (yellow card) 45+4'; Mavropanos (yellow card) 73'	Report	Terodde 21'; Drexler (yellow card) 28'; Bülter (yellow card) 45'	Stadium: Mercedes-Benz Arena; Attendance: 47,500; Referee: Florian Badstubner

10 September 2022 6	Bayern Munich	2–2	VfB Stuttgart	Munich
15:30 CEST (UTC+2)	Tel 36'; Musiala 60'; De Ligt (yellow card) 90+1'; Sané (yellow card) 90+4'	Report	Sosa (yellow card) 4'; Führich 57'; Itō (yellow card) 59'; Ahamada (yellow card) 79'; Anton (yellow card) 81'; Karazor (yellow card) 90'; Guirassy 90+2' (pen.)	Stadium: Allianz Arena; Attendance: 75,000; Referee: Christian Dingert

17 September 2022 7	VfB Stuttgart	1–3	Eintracht Frankfurt	Stuttgart
15:30 CEST (UTC+2)	Karazor (yellow card) 31'; Mavropanos (yellow card) 53'; Tomás 79'	Report	Rode 6'; Kamada 55'; Jakić 88'	Stadium: Mercedes-Benz Arena; Attendance: 47,500; Referee: Daniel Siebert

1 October 2022 8	VfL Wolfsburg	3–2	VfB Stuttgart	Wolfsburg
15:30 CEST (UTC+2)	Marmoush 23'; Arnold 38'; Wimmer (yellow card) 42'; Baku (yellow card) 53'; Arnold (yellow card) 71'; Gerhardt 90+1'	Report	Guirassy 22', (yellow card) 47'; Mavropanos 45+1'; Anton (yellow card) 48'; Itō (yellow card) 70'; Karazor (yellow card) 79'; Millot (yellow card) 84'	Stadium: Volkswagen Arena; Attendance: 24,125; Referee: Felix Zwayer

9 October 2022 9	VfB Stuttgart	0–1	Union Berlin	Stuttgart
19:30 CEST (UTC+2)	Karazor (yellow card) 58'; Guirassy (yellow card) 78' (yellow-red card) 82'	Report	Gießelmann (yellow card) 66'; Jaeckel 76'; Khedira (yellow card) 78'; Seguin (yellow card) 90+3'	Stadium: Mercedes-Benz Arena; Attendance: 43,250; Referee: Bastian Dankert

15 October 2022 10	VfB Stuttgart	4–1	VfL Bochum	Stuttgart
15:30 CEST (UTC+2)	Silas 3' (pen.), 64'; Ahamada 22'; Endo 71'	Report	Förster (yellow card) 16'; Zoller 29'; Gamboa (yellow card) 71'; Stöger (yellow card) 72'	Stadium: Mercedes-Benz Arena; Attendance: 45,400; Referee: Christian Dingert

22 October 2022 11	Borussia Dortmund	5–0	VfB Stuttgart	Dortmund
15:30 CEST (UTC+2)	Bellingham 2', 53'; Süle 13'; Reyna 44'; Özcan (yellow card) 45+1'; Hummels (yellow card) 66'; Moukoko 72'	Report		Stadium: Signal Iduna Park; Attendance: 81,365; Referee: Daniel Schlager

29 October 2022 12	VfB Stuttgart	2–1	FC Augsburg	Stuttgart
15:30 CEST (UTC+2)	Guirassy 15'; Pfeiffer (yellow card) 90'; Anton 90+1'	Report	Niederlechner 4'; Gruezo (yellow card) 13'; Rexhbecaj (yellow card) 78'	Stadium: Mercedes-Benz Arena; Attendance: 46,400; Referee: Tobias Stieler

4 November 2022 13	Borussia Mönchengladbach	3–1	VfB Stuttgart	Mönchengladbach
20:30 CET (UTC+1)	Hofmann 4'; Bensebaini (yellow card) 17'; Thuram 25', (yellow card) 88'; Herrmann 90+4'	Report	Tomás 35'; Mavropanos (yellow card) 73'	Stadium: Borussia-Park; Attendance: 53,178; Referee: Matthias Jöllenbeck

8 November 2022 14	VfB Stuttgart	2–1	Hertha BSC	Stuttgart
20:30 CET (UTC+1)	Guirassy 3'; Egloff (yellow card) 56'; Sosa (yellow card) 73'; Mavropanos (yellow card) 34', (goal) 90+8'	Report	Lukebakio 19'; Kempf (yellow card) 31'; Richter (yellow card) 34'	Stadium: Mercedes-Benz Arena; Attendance: 44,500; Referee: Frank Willenborg

12 November 2022 15	Bayer Leverkusen	2–0	VfB Stuttgart	Leverkusen
15:30 CET (UTC+1)	Diaby 30'; Amiri (yellow card) 69'; Tah 82'; Hložek (yellow card) 90+2'	Report	Zagadou (yellow card) 39'; Führich (yellow card) 61'; Tomás (yellow card) 65'	Stadium: BayArena; Attendance: 30,210; Referee: Florian Badstübner

21 January 2023 16	VfB Stuttgart	1–1	Mainz 05	Stuttgart
15:30 CET (UTC+1)	Guirassy 36'; Silas (yellow card) 70'	Report	Ingvartsen 40' (pen.); Kohr (yellow card) 61'; Barreiro (yellow card) 79'; Fulgini (yellow card) 90'	Stadium: Mercedes-Benz-Arena; Attendance: 45,903; Referee: Felix Brych

24 January 2023 17	1899 Hoffenheim	2–2	VfB Stuttgart	Sinsheim
20:30 CET (UTC+1)	Kramarić 11', 90+4'; Akpoguma (yellow card) 62'	Report	Guirassy 45+5'; Karazor (yellow card) 66'; Ahamada (yellow card) 73' (yellow-red card) 78'; Endo 77'	Stadium: Rhein-Neckar-Arena; Attendance: 23,159; Referee: Florian Badstübner

27 January 2023 18	RB Leipzig	2–1	VfB Stuttgart	Leipzig
20:30 CET (UTC+1)	Szoboszlai 25', 49'	Report	Führich 68' (pen.)	Stadium: Red Bull Arena; Attendance: 46,158; Referee: Felix Zwayer

5 February 2023 19	VfB Stuttgart	0–2	Werder Bremen	Stuttgart
15:30 CET (UTC+1)	Anton (yellow card) 13'; Nartey (yellow card) 40'	Report	Schmidt (yellow card) 38'; Stage 59', (yellow card) 90+4'; Pieper (yellow card) 65'; Friedl (yellow card) 69'; Bittencourt (yellow card) 75'; Ducksch 77'	Stadium: Mercedes-Benz Arena; Attendance: 47,700; Referee: Frank Willenborg

11 February 2023 20	SC Freiburg	2–1	VfB Stuttgart	Freiburg
15:30 CET (UTC+1)	Grifo 60' (pen.), 84' (pen.), (yellow card) 85'; Höfler (yellow card) 63'; Günter (yellow card) 74'	Report	Führich 30'; Karazor (yellow card) 40'; Zagadou (yellow card) 59'; Itō (yellow card) 90+7'	Stadium: Europa-Park Stadion; Attendance: 34,700; Referee: Sascha Stegemann

18 February 2023 21	VfB Stuttgart	3–0	1. FC Köln	Stuttgart
15:30 CET (UTC+1)	Dias 9'; Silas (yellow card) 23'; Mavropanos (yellow card) 51'; Sosa 59'; Coulibaly 74'; Millot (yellow card) 82'	Report	Chabot (yellow card) 23'; Schmitz (yellow card) 58'; Skhiri (yellow card) 65'; Adamyan (yellow card) 84'	Stadium: Mercedes-Benz Arena; Attendance: 46,850; Referee: Benjamin Cortus

25 February 2023 22	Schalke 04	2–1	VfB Stuttgart	Gelsenkirchen
15:30 CET (UTC+1)	Drexler 10'; Bulter 40'; Král (yellow card) 42'; Greiml (yellow card) 90+6'	Report	Sosa 63', (yellow card) 70'; Karazor (yellow card) 90+1'	Stadium: Veltins-Arena; Attendance: 62,271; Referee: Deniz Aytekin

4 March 2023 23	VfB Stuttgart	1–2	Bayern Munich	Stuttgart
18:30 CET (UTC+1)	Perea 88'	Report	De Ligt 39'; Choupo-Moting 62'	Stadium: Mercedes-Benz Arena; Attendance: 47,800; Referee: Christian Dingert

11 March 2023 24	Eintracht Frankfurt	1–1	VfB Stuttgart	Frankfurt
15:30 CET (UTC+1)	Rode (yellow card) 27', (goal) 55'; Sow (yellow card) 75'; Götze (yellow card) 90'; Ndicka (yellow card) 90+3'	Report	Coulibaly (yellow card) 72'; Silas 75'	Stadium: Deutsche Bank Park; Attendance: 50,000; Referee: Robert Hartmann

18 March 2023 25	VfB Stuttgart	0–1	VfL Wolfsburg	Stuttgart
15:30 CET (UTC+1)	Karazor (yellow card) 9'	Report	Marmoush 56'	Stadium: Mercedes-Benz Arena; Attendance: 44,900; Referee: Felix Brych

1 April 2023 26	Union Berlin	3–0	VfB Stuttgart	Berlin
15:30 CEST (UTC+2)	Leite (yellow card) 28'; Becker 51'; Behrens 65'; Haraguchi 68' (o.g.)	Report	Haraguchi (yellow card) 23'	Stadium: Stadion An der Alten Försterei; Attendance: 22,012; Referee: Florian Badstübner

9 April 2023 27	VfL Bochum	2–3	VfB Stuttgart	Bochum
17:30 CEST (UTC+2)	Antwi-Adjei (yellow card) 36'; Stöger 58' (pen.); Hofmann 85'; Losilla (yellow card) 90+5'; Riemann (yellow card) 90+7'	Report	Itō 14'; Guirassy (yellow card) 37', (goal) 60'; Vagnoman 63'; Mavropanos (yellow card) 90+5'; Bredlow (yellow card) 90+7'	Stadium: Vonovia Ruhrstadion; Attendance: 26,000; Referee: Frank Willenborg

15 April 2023 28	VfB Stuttgart	3–3	Borussia Dortmund	Stuttgart
15:30 CEST (UTC+2)	Mavropanos (yellow card) 35' (yellow-red card) 39'; Endo (yellow card) 35'; Coulibaly 79'; Vagnoman 84'; Tomás (yellow card) 88'; Silas 90+7', (yellow card) 90+8'	Report	Haller 26'; Malen 33'; Bellingham (yellow card) 57'; Reus (yellow card) 71'; Reyna (yellow card) 86', (goal) 90+2'	Stadium: Mercedes-Benz Arena; Attendance: 47,300; Referee: Harm Osmers

21 April 2023 29	FC Augsburg	1–1	VfB Stuttgart	Augsburg
20:30 CEST (UTC+2)	Beljo 8'; Bauer (yellow card) 62'; Rexhbeçaj (yellow card) 78'; Uduokhai (yellow card) 85'; Baumgartlinger (yellow card) 89'; Maier (yellow card) 90+1'	Report	Itō (yellow card) 20'; Coulibaly (yellow card) 52'; Vagnoman (yellow card) 70'; Endo 78'	Stadium: WWK Arena; Attendance: 30,660; Referee: Christian Dingert

29 April 2023 30	VfB Stuttgart	2–1	Borussia Mönchengladbach	Stuttgart
15:30 CEST (UTC+2)	Guirassy 22'; Zagadou (yellow card) 77'; Coulibaly 83' (pen.); Karazor (yellow card) 85'	Report	Weigl (yellow card) 45+1', (goal) 78' (pen.); Lainer (yellow card) 61'; Itakura (red card) 82'	Stadium: Mercedes-Benz Arena; Attendance: 45,000; Referee: Tobias Welz

6 May 2023 31	Hertha BSC	2–1	VfB Stuttgart	Berlin
15:30 CEST (UTC+2)	Uremović (yellow card) 18'; Niederlechner (yellow card) 19', (goal) 45+2'; Kempf 29'; Richter (yellow card) 66'; Christensen (yellow card) 90'	Report	Guirassy 38'; Endo (yellow card) 63'	Stadium: Olympiastadion; Attendance: 63,443; Referee: Deniz Aytekin

14 May 2023 32	VfB Stuttgart	1–1	Bayer Leverkusen	Stuttgart
15:30 CEST (UTC+2)	Guirassy 57' (pen.); Anton (yellow card) 64'; Bredlow (yellow card) 68'; Coulibaly (yellow card) 70'	Report	Bakker (yellow card) 50'; Hincapié (yellow card) 60'; Palacios 70' (pen.); Wirtz (yellow card) 75'; Demirbay (yellow card) 90'	Stadium: Mercedes-Benz Arena; Attendance: 46,300; Referee: Frank Willenborg

21 May 2023 33	Mainz 05	1–4	VfB Stuttgart	Mainz
15:30 CEST (UTC+2)	Ingvartsen 23'; Kohr (yellow card) 61'; Bell (yellow card) 75'; Ajorque (yellow card) 90+5'	Report	Endo 41', (yellow card) 73'; Guirassy 64'; Führich 78'; Coulibaly 90+1'	Stadium: Mewa Arena; Attendance: 33,305; Referee: Sven Jablonski

27 May 2023 34	VfB Stuttgart	1–1	1899 Hoffenheim	Stuttgart
15:30 CEST (UTC+2)	Tomás 80'	Report	Bebou 75'	Stadium: Mercedes-Benz Arena; Attendance: 47,500; Referee: Robert Schröder

==== Relegation play-offs ====
1 June 2023 First leg	VfB Stuttgart	3–0	Hamburger SV	Stuttgart
20:45 CEST (UTC+2)	Mavropanos 1'; Guirassy (penalty missed) 26', 54'; Vagnoman 51'; Karazor (yellow card) 76'	Report	Reis (yellow card) 15'; Suhonen (red card) 69'; Königsdörffer (yellow card) 73'	Stadium: Mercedes-Benz Arena; Attendance: 47,500; Referee: Tobias Welz

5 June 2023 Second leg	Hamburger SV	1–3 (1–6 agg.)	VfB Stuttgart	Hamburg
20:45 CEST (UTC+2)	Kittel 6', (yellow card) 65'; Muheim (yellow card) 65'; Bilbija (yellow card) 68'; Mikelbrencis (yellow card) 83'; Schonlau (yellow card) 90+4'	Report	Mavropanos (yellow card) 25'; Millot 48', 64'; Guirassy (yellow card) 58'; Führich (yellow card) 66'; Sosa (yellow card) 66'; Tomás (yellow card) 90+3'; Karazor (yellow card) 90+5'; Silas 90+7'	Stadium: Volksparkstadion; Attendance: 55,500; Referee: Bastian Dankert

=== DFB-Pokal ===
29 July 2022 First round	Dynamo Dresden	0–1	VfB Stuttgart	Dresden
18:01 CEST (UTC+2)	Akoto (yellow card) 48'	Report	Churlinov 33'; Anton (yellow card) 61' (yellow-red card) 67'; Millot (yellow card) 90'; Endo (yellow card) 90+5'	Stadium: Rudolf-Harbig-Stadion; Attendance: 22,644; Referee: Florian Badstübner

19 October 2022 Second round	VfB Stuttgart	6–0	Arminia Bielefeld	Stuttgart
20:45 CEST (UTC+2)	Stenzel 20', (yellow card) 34'; Endo 24'; Pfeiffer 29', 52'; Silas 39'; Guirassy 67'	Report	Serra (yellow card) 45'; Prietl (yellow card) 53'	Stadium: Mercedes-Benz Arena; Attendance: 50,000; Referee: Robert Hartmann

31 January 2023 Round of 16	SC Paderborn	1–2	VfB Stuttgart	Paderborn
18:00 CET (UTC+1)	Mavropanos 4' (o.g.); Pieringer (yellow card) 18'; Muslija (yellow card) 89'	Report	Perea (yellow card) 15'; Guirassy (yellow card) 55', (goal) 90+5'; Mavropanos (yellow card) 72'; Karazor (yellow card) 74'; Dias 86'	Stadium: Home Deluxe Arena; Attendance: 14,000; Referee: Daniel Schlager

5 April 2023 Quarter-finals	1. FC Nürnberg	0–1	VfB Stuttgart	Nuremberg
18:00 CEST (UTC+2)	Hübner (yellow card) 12'; Horn (yellow card) 58'; Nürnberger (yellow card) 73'	Report	Karazor (yellow card) 16'; Millot 83', (yellow card) 90+4'; Bredlow (yellow card) 90+2'	Stadium: Max-Morlock-Stadion; Attendance: 50,000; Referee: Daniel Siebert

3 May 2023 Semi-finals	VfB Stuttgart	2–3	Eintracht Frankfurt	Stuttgart
20:45 CEST (UTC+2)	Guirassy (yellow card) 9'; Tomás 19', (yellow card) 20'; Bredlow (yellow card) 75'; Itō (yellow card) 80'; Sosa (yellow card) 80' (yellow-red card) 86'; Millot 83'	Report	Götze (yellow card) 4'; Sow (yellow card) 5'; Ndicka 51'; Kamada 55'; Kolo Muani 77' (pen.); Buta (yellow card) 90+2'; Lenz (yellow card) 90+3'	Stadium: Mercedes-Benz Arena; Attendance: 47,500; Referee: Daniel Schlager

== Statistics ==
=== Appearances and goals ===
No.	Pos	Nat	Player	Total		Bundesliga		DFB-Pokal	
No.	Pos	Nat	Player	Apps	Goals	Apps	Goals	Apps	Goals
Goalkeepers
1	GK	(Germany) GER	Florian Müller	20	0	19	0	1	0
33	GK	(Germany) GER	Fabian Bredlow	7	0	5	0	2	0
42	GK	(Germany) GER	Fabian Schock	0	0	0	0	0	0
Defenders
2	DF	(Germany) GER	Waldemar Anton	26	1	24	1	2	0
4	DF	(Germany) GER	Josha Vagnoman	15	0	7+6	0	2	0
5	DF	(Greece) GRE	Konstantinos Mavropanos	23	2	20+1	2	2	0
15	DF	(Germany) GER	Pascal Stenzel	14	1	3+8	0	1+2	1
16	DF	(Germany) GER	Atakan Karazor	23	0	14+7	0	2	0
21	DF	(Japan) JPN	Hiroki Itō	25	0	21+1	0	3	0
23	DF	(France) FRA	Dan-Axel Zagadou	9	0	7+2	0	0	0
24	DF	(Croatia) CRO	Borna Sosa	18	2	14+3	2	1	0
37	DF	(Germany) GER	Antonis Aidonis	0	0	0	0	0	0
Midfielders
3	MF	(Japan) JPN	Wataru Endo	26	4	23	3	3	1
7	MF	(France) FRA	Tanguy Coulibaly	7	1	0+6	1	0+1	0
8	MF	(France) FRA	Enzo Millot	16	0	3+11	0	1+1	0
17	MF	(Japan) JPN	Genki Haraguchi	7	0	6	0	0+1	0
22	MF	(Germany) GER	Chris Führich	26	4	16+7	4	3	0
25	MF	(Germany) GER	Lilian Egloff	12	0	2+8	0	0+2	0
28	MF	(Denmark) DEN	Nikolas Nartey	9	0	4+3	0	1+1	0
36	MF	(Germany) GER	Laurin Ulrich	1	0	0+1	0	0	0
Forwards
9	FW	(Guinea) GUI	Serhou Guirassy	15	8	12+1	6	1+1	2
10	FW	(Portugal) POR	Tiago Tomás	20	2	12+6	2	2	0
11	FW	(Colombia) COL	Juan José Perea	17	1	2+12	1	1+2	0
14	FW	(Democratic Republic of the Congo) COD	Silas	23	5	18+3	4	2	1
20	FW	(Germany) GER	Luca Pfeiffer	18	2	6+10	0	1+1	2
27	FW	(Australia) AUS	Alou Kuol	1	0	0+1	0	0	0
31	FW	(Portugal) POR	Gil Dias	7	2	5+1	1	0+1	1
39	FW	(Germany) GER	Thomas Kastanaras	4	0	1+3	0	0	0
Players transferred out during the season
6	MF	(England) ENG	Clinton Mola	2	0	0+1	0	0+1	0
9	FW	(Austria) AUT	Saša Kalajdžić	3	0	3	0	0	0
17	MF	(North Macedonia) MKD	Darko Churlinov	2	1	0+1	0	1	1
19	FW	(Denmark) DEN	Wahid Faghir	0	0	0	0	0	0
29	MF	(Germany) GER	Philipp Klement	0	0	0	0	0	0
31	MF	(Germany) GER	Mateo Klimowicz	0	0	0	0	0	0
32	MF	(France) FRA	Naouirou Ahamada	18	2	17	2	1	0
43	DF	(Germany) GER	Maxime Awoudja	0	0	0	0	0	0

Last updated: 11 March 2023
Source: Competitions

=== Goalscorers ===
Rank	Pos.	No.	Nat.	Player	Bundesliga	DFB-Pokal	Total
1	FW	9	(Guinea)	Serhou Guirassy	6	2	8
2	FW	14	(Democratic Republic of the Congo)	Silas	4	1	5
3	MF	3	(Japan)	Wataru Endo	3	1	4
3	MF	22	(Germany)	Chris Führich	4	0	4
5	DF	5	(Greece)	Konstantinos Mavropanos	2	0	2
5	FW	10	(Portugal)	Tiago Tomás	2	0	2
5	FW	20	(Germany)	Luca Pfeiffer	0	2	2
5	DF	24	(Croatia)	Borna Sosa	2	0	2
5	FW	31	(Portugal)	Gil Dias	1	1	2
5	MF	32	(France)	Naouirou Ahamada	2	0	2
11	DF	2	(Germany)	Waldemar Anton	1	0	1
11	MF	7	(France)	Tanguy Coulibaly	1	0	1
11	FW	11	(Colombia)	Juan José Perea	1	0	1
11	DF	15	(Germany)	Pascal Stenzel	0	1	1
11	MF	17	(North Macedonia)	Darko Churlinov	0	1	1
Own goals					0	0	0
Totals					29	9	38

Last updated: 11 March 2023
