= 2020–21 VfB Stuttgart season =

VfB Stuttgart
2020–21 season
- President: Claus Vogt
- Coach: Pellegrino Matarazzo
- Stadium: Mercedes-Benz Arena
- Bundesliga: 9th
- DFB-Pokal: Round of 16
- Top goalscorer: League: Saša Kalajdžić (16); All: Saša Kalajdžić (17)
Home colours	Away colours	Third colours

The 2020–21 season was the 128th season in the existence of VfB Stuttgart and the club's first season back in the top flight of German football. In addition to the domestic league, VfB Stuttgart participated in this season's edition of the DFB-Pokal. The season covered the period from 1 July 2020 to 30 June 2021.

== Players ==
=== First-team squad ===
As of 1 February 2021

Note: Flags indicate national team as defined under FIFA eligibility rules; some limited exceptions apply. Players may hold more than one non-FIFA nationality.

No.	Pos.	Nation	Player
1	GK	SUI	Gregor Kobel
2	DF	GER	Waldemar Anton
3	MF	JPN	Wataru Endo (vice-captain)
4	DF	GER	Marc-Oliver Kempf (3rd captain)
5	DF	GRE	Konstantinos Mavropanos (on loan from Arsenal)
6	MF	ENG	Clinton Mola
7	FW	FRA	Tanguy Coulibaly
8	MF	GER	Gonzalo Castro (captain)
9	FW	AUT	Saša Kalajdžić
10	MF	GER	Daniel Didavi
11	MF	GER	Erik Thommy
13	GK	GER	Jens Grahl
14	FW	COD	Silas
15	DF	GER	Pascal Stenzel
16	MF	GER	Atakan Karazor
18	FW	GER	Hamadi Al Ghaddioui

No.	Pos.	Nation	Player
19	MF	MKD	Darko Churlinov
20	MF	GER	Philipp Förster
21	MF	GER	Philipp Klement
22	FW	ARG	Nicolás González
23	MF	BEL	Orel Mangala
24	DF	CRO	Borna Sosa
25	MF	GER	Lilian Egloff
26	DF	GER	Antonis Aidonis
29	FW	GUI	Momo Cissé
30	FW	GER	Roberto Massimo
31	MF	GER	Mateo Klimowicz
32	MF	FRA	Naouirou Ahamada (on loan from Juventus)
33	GK	GER	Fabian Bredlow
35	DF	POL	Marcin Kamiński
36	DF	GER	Luca Mack

=== Out on loan ===
Note: Flags indicate national team as defined under FIFA eligibility rules; some limited exceptions apply. Players may hold more than one non-FIFA nationality.

No.	Pos.	Nation	Player
—	DF	GER	Maxime Awoudja (at Türkgücü München until 30 June 2021)
—	DF	ESP	Pablo Maffeo (at SD Huesca until 30 June 2021)
—	MF	DEN	Nikolas Nartey (at SV Sandhausen until 30 June 2021)

== Transfers ==
=== In ===
No.	Pos	Player	Transferred from	Fee	Date	Source
3	MF	(Japan) Wataru Endo	(Belgium) Sint-Truiden	€1,700,000	1 July 2020	
15	DF	(Germany) Pascal Stenzel	(Germany) SC Freiburg	€1,300,000	1 July 2020	
5	DF	(Greece) Konstantinos Mavropanos	(England) Arsenal	Loan	16 July 2020	
1	GK	(Switzerland) Gregor Kobel	(Germany) TSG Hoffenheim	€4,000,000	28 July 2020	
2	DF	(Germany) Waldemar Anton	(Germany) Hannover 96	€4,000,000	28 July 2020	
29	FW	(France) Momo Cissé	(France) Le Havre B	Free	17 August 2020	
32	MF	(France) Naouirou Ahamada	(Italy) Juventus U23	Loan	5 October 2020	

=== Out ===
No.	Pos	Player	Transferred to	Fee	Date	Source
11	FW	(Greece) Anastasios Donis	(France) Stade de Reims	€4,000,000	1 July 2020	
19	FW	(Democratic Republic of the Congo) Chadrac Akolo	(France) Amiens SC	€3,500,000	1 July 2020	
27	FW	(Germany) Mario Gómez	Retired		1 July 2020	
	MF	(Denmark) Nikolas Nartey	(Germany) SV Sandhausen	Loan	31 July 2020	
29	MF	(Poland) David Kopacz	(Germany) Würzburger Kickers	Undisclosed	31 July 2020	
7	DF	(Spain) Pablo Maffeo	(Spain) SD Huesca	Loan	8 September 2020	
17	DF	(Germany) Maxime Awoudja	(Germany) Türkgücü München	Loan	31 January 2021	
39	DF	(Brazil) Ailton	(Denmark) FC Midtjylland	Free	1 February 2021	

== Pre-season and friendlies ==
Win Draw Loss

8 August 2020 Friendly	VfB Stuttgart	6–1	SV Sandhausen	Stuttgart, Germany
11:00 CEST (UTC+2)	Förster 22'; Castro 33'; Didavi 63'; Stenzel 76'; Endo 84'; González 86'	Report	Behrens 39'	Stadium: Robert-Schlienz-Stadion

14 August 2020 Friendly	Marseille	Cancelled	VfB Stuttgart	Fos-sur-mer, France
19:00 CEST (UTC+2)		Report		Stadium: Stade Parsemain

19 August 2020 Friendly	Mainz 05	Cancelled	VfB Stuttgart	Mainz, Germany
16:00 CEST (UTC+2)		Report		Stadium: Stadion am Bruchweg

22 August 2020 Friendly	Liverpool	3–0	VfB Stuttgart	Langau, Austria
17:00 CEST (UTC+2)	Firmino 15'; Gomez (yellow card) 30'; Keïta 40'; Brewster 68'	Report		Stadium: Sportplatz Langau

26 August 2020 Friendly	VfB Stuttgart	3–2	Hamburger SV	Kufstein, Austria
16:00 CEST (UTC+2)	Klimowicz 9'; González 32', 39'	Report	Terodde 43'; Wintzheimer 66'	Stadium: Kufstein Arena

29 August 2020 Friendly	VfB Stuttgart	2–0	Arminia Bielefeld	Kufstein, Austria
16:00 CEST (UTC+2)	González 20' (pen.); Didavi 45'			Stadium: Kufstein Arena

5 September 2020 Friendly	VfB Stuttgart	4–2	Strasbourg	Stuttgart, Germany
16:30 CEST (UTC+2)	González 10' (pen.); Didavi 37'; Endo 52'; Kalajdžić 55'	Report	Ajorque 8'; Thomasson 14'	Stadium: Robert-Schlienz-Stadion

8 October 2020 Friendly	SC Freiburg	0–3	VfB Stuttgart	Freiburg, Germany
14:00 CEST (UTC+2)		Report	Castro 6' (pen.); Coulibaly 62', 83'	Stadium: Schwarzwald-Stadion

13 November 2020 Friendly	VfB Stuttgart	1–0	1. FC Heidenheim	Stuttgart, Germany
15:00 CET (UTC+1)	Förster 65'	Report		Stadium: Robert-Schlienz-Stadion; Attendance: 0 Referee: Martin Petersen

25 March 2021 Friendly	VfB Stuttgart	3–0	Würzburger Kickers	Stuttgart, Germany
15:00 CET (UTC+1)	González 38'; Didavi 64' (pen.); Förster 78'	Report		Stadium: Robert-Schlienz-Stadion; Attendance: 0 Referee: Markus Schmidt

== Competitions ==
=== Overview ===
Competition	First match	Last match	Starting round	Final position	Record							
Competition	First match	Last match	Starting round	Final position	Pld	W	D	L	GF	GA	GD	Win %
Bundesliga	19 September 2020	22 May 2021	Matchday 1	9th	34	12	9	13	56	55	+1	35.29
DFB-Pokal	13 September 2020	3 February 2021	First round	Round of 16	3	2	0	1	3	2	+1	66.67
Total					37	14	9	14	59	57	+2	37.84

Source: Soccerway

=== Bundesliga ===
==== League table ====
Pos	Team	Pld	W	D	L	GF	GA	GD	Pts	Qualification or relegation
7	Union Berlin	34	12	14	8	50	43	+7	50	Qualification for the Europa Conference League play-off round (Note: Since the winners of the 2020–21 DFB-Pokal, Borussia Dortmund, qualified for the Champions League based on league position, the Europa League group stage spot was passed to the sixth-placed team, and the Europa Conference League play-off round spot was passed to the seventh-placed team.)
8	Borussia Mönchengladbach	34	13	10	11	64	56	+8	49	
9	VfB Stuttgart	34	12	9	13	56	55	+1	45	
10	SC Freiburg	34	12	9	13	52	52	0	45	
11	1899 Hoffenheim	34	11	10	13	52	54	−2	43	

Source: DFB
Rules for classification: 1) Points; 2) Goal difference; 3) Goals scored; 4) Head-to-head results; 5) Head-to-head away goals scored; 6) Away goals scored; 7) Play-off.

==== Results summary ====
Overall								Home						Away					
Pld	W	D	L	GF	GA	GD	Pts	W	D	L	GF	GA	GD	W	D	L	GF	GA	GD
34	12	9	13	56	55	+1	45	5	6	6	27	26	+1	7	3	7	29	29	0

Source: DFB

==== Results by round ====
Round	1	2	3	4	5	6	7	8	9	10	11	12	13	14	15	16	17	18	19	20	21	22	23	24	25	26	27	28	29	30	31	32	33	34
Ground	H	A	H	A	H	A	H	A	H	A	A	H	A	H	A	H	A	A	H	A	H	A	H	A	H	A	H	H	A	H	A	H	A	H
Result	L	W	D	W	D	D	D	D	L	W	W	D	L	L	W	D	L	L	W	L	D	W	W	D	W	L	W	L	L	L	L	W	W	L
Position	12	8	8	5	5	7	8	8	10	8	7	7	7	11	10	10	10	10	10	10	10	10	10	9	8	9	8	9	10	10	10	10	9	9

Source: DFB
A = Away; H = Home; W = Win; D = Draw; L = Loss

==== Matches ====
The league fixtures were announced on 7 August 2020.

19 September 2020 1	VfB Stuttgart	2–3	SC Freiburg	Stuttgart
15:30 CEST (UTC+2)	Didavi (yellow card) 25'; Silas (yellow card) 44', (goal) 81'; Kalajdžić 71'	Report	Petersen 8'; Sallai 26'; Höler (yellow card) 35'; Grifo 48'; Kübler (yellow card) 90+6'	Stadium: Mercedes-Benz Arena; Attendance: 7,123; Referee: Benjamin Cortus

26 September 2020 2	Mainz 05	1–4	VfB Stuttgart	Mainz
15:30 CEST (UTC+2)	Quaison 13'; Niakhaté (yellow card) 37' (yellow-red card) 77'	Report	Silas 45'; Stenzel (yellow card) 52' (yellow-red card) 90+1'; Didavi 61'; Mangala (yellow card) 69'; Castro (yellow card) 74'; Klimowicz 80'; Kalajdžić 86'	Stadium: Opel Arena; Attendance: 3,403; Referee: Daniel Schlager

3 October 2020 3	VfB Stuttgart	1–1	Bayer Leverkusen	Stuttgart
15:30 CEST (UTC+2)	Kempf (yellow card) 69'; Massimo (yellow card) 75'; Kalajdžić 76'; Endo (yellow card) 89'	Report	Schick 7'; Bellarabi (yellow card) 75'; Aránguiz (yellow card) 89'	Stadium: Mercedes-Benz Arena; Attendance: 9,500; Referee: Robert Hartmann

17 October 2020 4	Hertha BSC	0–2	VfB Stuttgart	Berlin
15:30 CEST (UTC+2)	Cunha (yellow card) 15'; Stark (yellow card) 74'	Report	Kempf 9'; Kalajdžić (yellow card) 29'; Didavi (yellow card) 45'; Castro 68'	Stadium: Olympiastadion; Attendance: 4,000; Referee: Harm Osmers

23 October 2020 5	VfB Stuttgart	1–1	1. FC Köln	Stuttgart
20:30 CEST (UTC+2)	Mangala 1'; Silas (yellow card) 52'; Karazor (yellow card) 80'	Report	Ehizibue (yellow card) 8'; Andersson 23' (pen.); Jakobs (yellow card) 56'; Duda (yellow card) 69'; Skhiri (yellow card) 72'; Özcan (yellow card) 88'	Stadium: Mercedes-Benz Arena; Attendance: 0 Referee: Guido Winkmann

30 October 2020 6	Schalke 04	1–1	VfB Stuttgart	Gelsenkirchen
20:30 CET (UTC+1)	Thiaw 30'; Sané (yellow card) 56'; Mascarell (yellow card) 59'	Report	Castro (yellow card) 37'; González 56' (pen.), (yellow card) 81'	Stadium: Veltins-Arena; Attendance: 0 Referee: Benjamin Brand

7 November 2020 7	VfB Stuttgart	2–2	Eintracht Frankfurt	Stuttgart
15:30 CET (UTC+1)	González 17' (pen.), (yellow card) 77'; Castro 37', (yellow card) 88'	Report	Abraham (yellow card) 29', (goal) 75'; Barkok (yellow card) 50'; Hasebe (yellow card) 54'; Dost (yellow card) 54'; Silva 61'	Stadium: Mercedes-Benz Arena; Attendance: 0 Referee: Sascha Stegemann

21 November 2020 8	1899 Hoffenheim	3–3	VfB Stuttgart	Sinsheim
15:30 CET (UTC+1)	Sessegnon (yellow card) 4', (goal) 48'; Baumgartner 16'; Kramarić 70' (pen.); Posch (yellow card) 77'; Geiger (yellow card) 90+5'	Report	González 18'; Silas 27'; Castro (yellow card) 30'; Kempf (yellow card) 89', (goal) 90+3'	Stadium: Rhein-Neckar-Arena; Attendance: 0 Referee: Daniel Siebert

28 November 2020 9	VfB Stuttgart	1–3	Bayern Munich	Stuttgart
15:30 CET (UTC+1)	Coulibaly 20'	Report	Coman 38'; Lewandowski 45+1'; Costa 87'	Stadium: Mercedes-Benz Arena; Attendance: 0 Referee: Harm Osmers

6 December 2020 10	Werder Bremen	1–2	VfB Stuttgart	Bremen
15:30 CET (UTC+1)	Osako (yellow card) 25'; Chong (yellow card) 40'; Groß (yellow card) 66'; Selke (yellow card) 90+1', (goal) 90+3'	Report	Silas 31' (pen.), 90+1', (yellow card) 90+1'; Mavropanos (yellow card) 36'; Mangala (yellow card) 56'; Castro (yellow card) 59'	Stadium: Weser-Stadion; Attendance: 0 Referee: Frank Willenborg

12 December 2020 11	Borussia Dortmund	1–5	VfB Stuttgart	Dortmund
15:30 CET (UTC+1)	Can (yellow card) 26'; Reyna 39'; Morey (yellow card) 66'	Report	Silas 26' (pen.), 53', (yellow card) 50'; Mavropanos (yellow card) 28'; Endo (yellow card) 40'; Förster 60'; Coulibaly 63'; González 90+1'	Stadium: Signal Iduna Park; Attendance: 0 Referee: Christian Dingert

15 December 2020 12	VfB Stuttgart	2–2	Union Berlin	Stuttgart
20:30 CET (UTC+1)	Mavropanos (yellow card) 4'; Klimowicz (yellow card) 31'; González (yellow card) 56'; Kalajdžić 85', 90'	Report	Friedrich 4'; Prömel (yellow card) 35'; Griesbeck (yellow card) 55'; Awoniyi 77'; Gogia (yellow card) 90+3'	Stadium: Mercedes-Benz Arena; Attendance: 0 Referee: Sascha Stegemann

20 December 2020 13	VfL Wolfsburg	1–0	VfB Stuttgart	Wolfsburg
18:00 CET (UTC+1)	Brekalo 49'; Steffen (yellow card) 76'; Gerhardt (yellow card) 90+2'	Report	González (yellow card) 20'; Anton (yellow card) 48'; Mangala (yellow card) 86'	Stadium: Volkswagen Arena; Attendance: 0 Referee: Florian Badstübner

2 January 2021 14	VfB Stuttgart	0–1	RB Leipzig	Stuttgart
20:30 CET (UTC+1)	Stenzel (yellow card) 21'; Sosa (yellow card) 49'	Report	Forsberg (penalty missed) 22'; Sabitzer (yellow card) 42'; Olmo 67'	Stadium: Mercedes-Benz Arena; Attendance: 0 Referee: Christian Dingert

10 January 2021 15	FC Augsburg	1–4	VfB Stuttgart	Augsburg
15:30 CET (UTC+1)	Gruezo (yellow card) 23'; Richter 46', (yellow card) 73' (yellow-red card) 76'	Report	González 10' (pen.); Silas 29'; Anton (yellow card) 32'; Endo (yellow card) 50'; Castro 61'; Didavi 87'	Stadium: WWK Arena; Attendance: 0 Referee: Daniel Schlager

16 January 2021 16	VfB Stuttgart	2–2	Borussia Mönchengladbach	Stuttgart
18:30 CET (UTC+1)	González 58', (yellow card) 71'; Silas (yellow card) 81', (goal) 90+6' (pen.)	Report	Stindl 35' (pen.), (yellow card) 45'; Zakaria (yellow card) 37', (goal) 61'; Hofmann (yellow card) 74'	Stadium: Mercedes-Benz Arena; Attendance: 0 Referee: Felix Brych

20 January 2021 17	Arminia Bielefeld	3–0	VfB Stuttgart	Bielefeld
20:30 CET (UTC+1)	Klos 27'; Kempf 47' (o.g.); Yabo (yellow card) 60'; Doan 86'	Report		Stadium: Bielefelder Alm; Attendance: 0 Referee: Robert Hartmann

23 January 2021 18	SC Freiburg	2–1	VfB Stuttgart	Freiburg
15:30 CET (UTC+1)	Demirović 14'; Jeong 37'; Keitel (yellow card) 66'; Schmid (yellow card) 74'	Report	Silas 7'; González (penalty missed) 45'	Stadium: Schwarzwald-Stadion; Attendance: 0 Referee: Tobias Stieler

29 January 2021 19	VfB Stuttgart	2–0	Mainz 05	Stuttgart
20:30 CET (UTC+1)	Förster (yellow card) 33'; Kalajdžić 55'; Silas 72'	Report	Niakhaté (yellow card) 21'; Bell (yellow card) 43'; Onisiwo (yellow card) 45+1'; Kohr (yellow card) 81'	Stadium: Mercedes-Benz Arena; Attendance: 0 Referee: Frank Willenborg

6 February 2021 20	Bayer Leverkusen	5–2	VfB Stuttgart	Leverkusen
15:30 CET (UTC+1)	Demirbay 18', 31'; Bailey 56'; Wirtz 68'; Gray 84'	Report	Kalajdžić 50', 77'	Stadium: BayArena; Attendance: 0 Referee: Sven Jablonski

13 February 2021 21	VfB Stuttgart	1–1	Hertha BSC	Stuttgart
15:30 CET (UTC+1)	Mavropanos (yellow card) 7'; Kalajdžić 45+1'; Karazor (yellow card) 69'	Report	Piątek (yellow card) 13'; Pekarík (yellow card) 37'; Netz 82'	Stadium: Mercedes-Benz Arena; Attendance: 0 Referee: Harm Osmers

20 February 2021 22	1. FC Köln	0–1	VfB Stuttgart	Cologne
15:30 CET (UTC+1)	Čestić (yellow card) 19'; Czichos (yellow card) 86'	Report	Kempf (yellow card) 29'; Kalajdžić 49'	Stadium: RheinEnergieStadion; Attendance: 0 Referee: Benjamin Cortus

27 February 2021 23	VfB Stuttgart	5–1	Schalke 04	Stuttgart
15:30 CET (UTC+1)	Endo 10', 26', (yellow card) 66'; Kalajdžić 34'; Castro (yellow card) 59'; Klement 88'; Didavi 90+2'	Report	Becker (yellow card) 29'; Kolašinac 40'; Bentaleb (penalty missed) 72', (yellow card) 88'; Thiaw (yellow card) 77'	Stadium: Mercedes-Benz Arena; Attendance: 0 Referee: Guido Winkmann

6 March 2021 24	Eintracht Frankfurt	1–1	VfB Stuttgart	Frankfurt
15:30 CET (UTC+1)	Ndicka (yellow card) 27'; Hinteregger (yellow card) 31'; Kostić 69'	Report	Silas (yellow card) 54'; Coulibaly (yellow card) 59'; Kalajdžić 68'; Mangala (yellow card) 77'	Stadium: Deutsche Bank Park; Attendance: 0 Referee: Robert Schröder

14 March 2021 25	VfB Stuttgart	2–0	1899 Hoffenheim	Stuttgart
18:00 CET (UTC+1)	Kasim 15' (o.g.); Kalajdžić 64'	Report	Sessegnon (yellow card) 11'; Grillitsch (yellow card) 58'	Stadium: Mercedes-Benz Arena; Attendance: 0 Referee: Christian Dingert

20 March 2021 26	Bayern Munich	4–0	VfB Stuttgart	Munich
15:30 CET (UTC+1)	Davies (red card) 12'; Lewandowski 18', 23', 39'; Gnabry 22'; Boateng (yellow card) 37'	Report	Castro (yellow card) 61'; Kempf (yellow card) 86'	Stadium: Allianz Arena; Attendance: 0 Referee: Daniel Schlager

4 April 2021 27	VfB Stuttgart	1–0	Werder Bremen	Stuttgart
15:30 CEST (UTC+2)	Förster (yellow card) 16'; Augustinsson 81' (o.g.)	Report	Möhwald (yellow card) 12'; Eggestein (yellow card) 51'	Stadium: Mercedes-Benz Arena; Attendance: 0 Referee: Felix Zwayer

10 April 2021 28	VfB Stuttgart	2–3	Borussia Dortmund	Stuttgart
18:30 CEST (UTC+2)	Kalajdžić 17'; Sosa (yellow card) 21'; Förster (yellow card) 28'; Kempf (yellow card) 50'; Didavi 78'; Anton (yellow card) 82'	Report	Hummels (yellow card) 31'; Bellingham 47'; Reus 52'; Knauff 80'; Hitz (yellow card) 90+2'	Stadium: Mercedes-Benz Arena; Attendance: 0 Referee: Robert Schröder

17 April 2021 29	Union Berlin	2–1	VfB Stuttgart	Berlin
15:30 CEST (UTC+2)	Prömel (yellow card) 9', (goal) 20'; Musa 43'; Trimmel (yellow card) 83'	Report	Coulibaly (yellow card) 30'; Förster 49'; Karazor (yellow card) 51'; Mavropanos (yellow card) 90+2'	Stadium: Stadion An der Alten Försterei; Attendance: 0 Referee: Benjamin Cortus

21 April 2021 30	VfB Stuttgart	1–3	VfL Wolfsburg	Stuttgart
20:30 CEST (UTC+2)	Förster (penalty missed) 27'; Ahamada (yellow card) 63'; Castro (yellow card) 77', (goal) 90+2'; Cissé (yellow card) 86'	Report	Schlager 13'; Weghorst 29'; Gerhardt 65'	Stadium: Mercedes-Benz Arena; Attendance: 0 Referee: Felix Brych

25 April 2021 31	RB Leipzig	2–0	VfB Stuttgart	Leipzig
15:30 CEST (UTC+2)	Konaté (yellow card) 24'; Haidara 46'; Forsberg 67' (pen.); Henrichs (yellow card) 76'	Report	Ahamada (red card) 14'	Stadium: Red Bull Arena; Attendance: 0 Referee: Deniz Aytekin

7 May 2021 32	VfB Stuttgart	2–1	FC Augsburg	Stuttgart
20:30 CEST (UTC+2)	Förster 11'; Kalajdžić 74'	Report	Niederlechner 59'	Stadium: Mercedes-Benz Arena; Attendance: 0 Referee: Manuel Gräfe

15 May 2021 33	Borussia Mönchengladbach	1–2	VfB Stuttgart	Mönchengladbach
15:30 CEST (UTC+2)	Stindl 45'; Bensebaini (yellow card) 86'; Zakaria (yellow card) 89'	Report	Förster (yellow card) 64'; Endo 72', (yellow card) 90+3'; Kalajdžić 77'; Massimo (yellow card) 84'; Castro (yellow card) 89'	Stadium: Borussia-Park; Attendance: 0 Referee: Sascha Stegemann

22 May 2021 34	VfB Stuttgart	0–2	Arminia Bielefeld	Stuttgart
15:30 CEST (UTC+2)	Ahamada (yellow card) 65'	Report	Klos 66' (pen.); Doan 72'	Stadium: Mercedes-Benz Arena; Attendance: 0 Referee: Tobias Stieler

=== DFB-Pokal ===
13 September 2020 First round	Hansa Rostock	0–1	VfB Stuttgart	Rostock
15:30 CEST (UTC+2)	Farrona-Pulido (yellow card) 43'; Rother (yellow card) 82'; Kolke (yellow card) 90+3'; Neidhart (yellow card) 90+4'	Report	Kempf (yellow card) 33'; Silas 42'; Anton (yellow card) 90+2'	Stadium: Ostseestadion; Attendance: 7,500; Referee: Felix Zwayer

23 December 2020 Second round	VfB Stuttgart	1–0	SC Freiburg	Stuttgart
18:30 CET (UTC+1)	Kalajdžić 15'; Stenzel (yellow card) 44'; Klimowicz (yellow card) 55'	Report	Grifo (yellow card) 44'	Stadium: Mercedes-Benz Arena; Attendance: 0 Referee: Felix Brych

3 February 2021 Round of 16	VfB Stuttgart	1–2	Borussia Mönchengladbach	Stuttgart
20:45 CET (UTC+1)	Silas 2'; Mavropanos (yellow card) 18'; González (yellow card) 81'; Anton (yellow card) 90+3'	Report	Bensebaini (yellow card) 22'; Thuram 45+1'; Pléa 50'; Stindl (yellow card) 77'	Stadium: Mercedes-Benz Arena; Attendance: 0 Referee: Daniel Siebert

== Statistics ==
=== Appearances and goals ===
No.	Pos	Nat	Player	Total		Bundesliga		DFB-Pokal	
No.	Pos	Nat	Player	Apps	Goals	Apps	Goals	Apps	Goals
Goalkeepers
1	GK	(Switzerland) SUI	Gregor Kobel	34	0	33	0	1	0
13	GK	(Germany) GER	Jens Grahl	0	0	0	0	0	0
33	GK	(Germany) GER	Fabian Bredlow	3	0	1	0	2	0
Defenders
2	DF	(Germany) GER	Waldemar Anton	34	0	30+1	0	3	0
4	DF	(Germany) GER	Marc-Oliver Kempf	35	2	32	2	3	0
5	DF	(Greece) GRE	Konstantinos Mavropanos	22	0	19+2	0	1	0
15	DF	(Germany) GER	Pascal Stenzel	24	0	14+9	0	1	0
24	DF	(Croatia) CRO	Borna Sosa	28	0	25+1	0	1+1	0
26	DF	(Germany) GER	Antonis Aidonis	0	0	0	0	0	0
35	DF	(Poland) POL	Marcin Kamiński	6	0	2+3	0	1	0
36	DF	(Germany) GER	Luca Mack	1	0	0+1	0	0	0
Midfielders
3	MF	(Japan) JPN	Wataru Endo	36	3	33	3	3	0
6	MF	(England) ENG	Clinton Mola	0	0	0	0	0	0
8	MF	(Germany) GER	Gonzalo Castro	28	4	23+3	4	2	0
10	MF	(Germany) GER	Daniel Didavi	26	4	10+13	4	2+1	0
11	MF	(Germany) GER	Erik Thommy	8	0	3+5	0	0	0
16	MF	(Germany) GER	Atakan Karazor	19	0	10+9	0	0	0
19	MF	(North Macedonia) MKD	Darko Churlinov	16	0	0+14	0	0+2	0
20	MF	(Germany) GER	Philipp Förster	27	3	17+8	3	0+2	0
21	MF	(Germany) GER	Philipp Klement	19	1	2+16	1	0+1	0
23	MF	(Belgium) BEL	Orel Mangala	27	1	24	1	3	0
25	MF	(Germany) GER	Lilian Egloff	2	0	0+2	0	0	0
31	MF	(Argentina) ARG	Mateo Klimowicz	27	1	12+13	1	1+1	0
32	MF	(France) FRA	Naouirou Ahamada	6	0	3+3	0	0	0
Forwards
7	FW	(France) FRA	Tanguy Coulibaly	34	2	17+14	2	1+2	0
9	FW	(Austria) AUT	Saša Kalajdžić	36	17	23+10	16	3	1
14	FW	(Democratic Republic of the Congo) COD	Silas	27	13	24+1	11	2	2
18	FW	(Germany) GER	Hamadi Al Ghaddioui	7	0	0+6	0	0+1	0
22	FW	(Argentina) ARG	Nicolás González	17	6	10+5	6	2	0
29	FW	(France) FRA	Momo Cissé	5	0	0+5	0	0	0
30	FW	(Germany) GER	Roberto Massimo	20	0	7+11	0	1+1	0
44	MF	(Netherlands) NED	Mohamed Sankoh	1	0	0+1	0	0	0
Players transferred out during the season
17	DF	(Germany) GER	Maxime Awoudja	0	0	0	0	0	0
39	DF	(Brazil) BRA	Ailton	0	0	0	0	0	0

Last updated: 22 May 2021
Source: Competitions

=== Goalscorers ===
Rank	Pos	No.	Nat	Name	Bundesliga	DFB-Pokal	Total
1	FW	9	(Austria)	Saša Kalajdžić	16	1	17
2	FW	14	(Democratic Republic of the Congo)	Silas	11	2	13
3	FW	22	(Argentina)	Nicolás González	6	0	6
4	MF	8	(Germany)	Gonzalo Castro	4	0	4
4	MF	10	(Germany)	Daniel Didavi	4	0	4
6	MF	3	(Japan)	Wataru Endo	3	0	3
6	MF	20	(Germany)	Philipp Förster	3	0	3
8	DF	4	(Germany)	Marc-Oliver Kempf	2	0	2
8	FW	7	(France)	Tanguy Coulibaly	2	0	2
10	MF	21	(Germany)	Philipp Klement	1	0	1
10	MF	23	(Belgium)	Orel Mangala	1	0	1
10	MF	31	(Argentina)	Mateo Klimowicz	1	0	1
Own goals					2	0	2
Totals					56	3	59

Last updated: 22 May 2021
