= Hiroki Itō (footballer, born 1999) =

Japanese footballer (born 1999)

Hiroki Ito
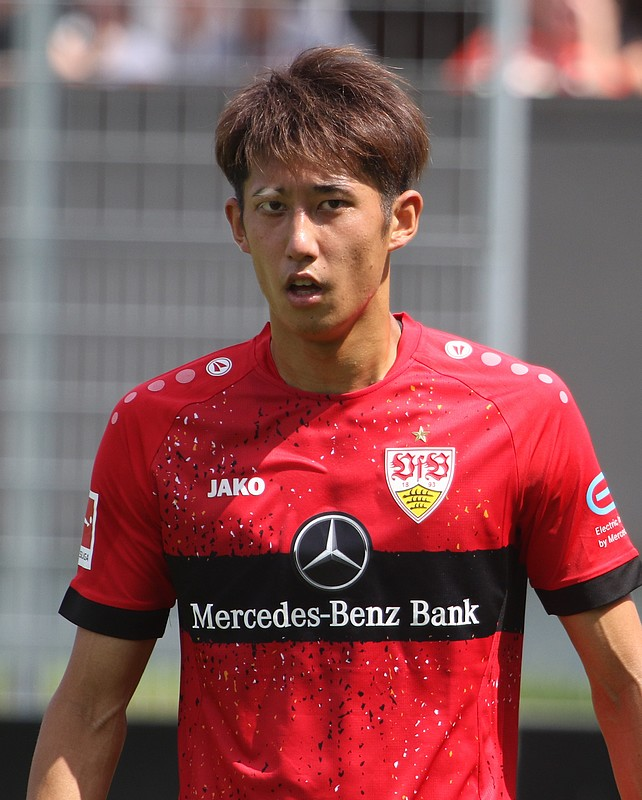
- Ito with VfB Stuttgart in 2021

Personal information
- Full name: Hiroki Ito
- Date of birth: 12 May 1999 (age 27)
- Place of birth: Hamamatsu, Shizuoka, Japan
- Height: 1.88 m (6 ft 2 in)
- Positions: Centre-back; left-back; defensive midfielder

Team information
- Current team: Bayern Munich
- Number: 21

Youth career
- Santos FC Academy Japan
- –2011: Hamamatsu Kaba SSS
- 2012–2017: Júbilo Iwata

Senior career*
Years	Team	Apps	(Gls)
2018–2022	Júbilo Iwata	58	(4)
2019	→ Nagoya Grampus (loan)	2	(0)
2021–2022	→ VfB Stuttgart (loan)	29	(1)
2022–2024	VfB Stuttgart	56	(1)
2024–	Bayern Munich	24	(2)

International career^{‡}
2015	Japan U17	1	(0)
2016–2017	Japan U18	6	(2)
2017–2018	Japan U19	5	(1)
2019	Japan U20	6	(0)
2018	Japan U23	2	(0)
2022–	Japan	33	(1)
Medal record
Representing Japan
AFC U-19 Championship
Bronze medal – third place	2018 Indonesia
- * Club domestic league appearances and goals as of 16:28, 7 November 2026 (UTC) ‡ National team caps and goals as of 14 November 2026

Hiroki Ito (伊藤 洋輝, Itō Hiroki; born 12 May 1999) is a Japanese professional footballer who plays as a centre-back, left-back and defensive midfielder for Bundesliga club Bayern Munich and the Japan national team.

== Club career ==
=== Júbilo Iwata ===
After growing through Júbilo Iwata youth ranks, Hiroki Ito was promoted to the first team in 2018. He debuted as a pro in March 2018 in J. League Cup, and would soon make his first appearance in J1 League in August 2018. In 2019, he was loaned out to Nagoya Grampus, where he made nine appearances in all competitions.

=== VfB Stuttgart ===
In June 2021, Ito joined Bundesliga club VfB Stuttgart on loan, and was assigned to play for the second team in the Regionalliga Südwest. However, he was instantly promoted to the first team by coach Pellegrino Matarazzo, and started his first match in a 6–0 away win against BFC Dynamo in the DFB-Pokal. Afterwards that year, on 26 November, he scored his first Bundesliga goal in a 2–1 win over Mainz. On 20 May 2022, VfB Stuttgart exercised a purchase option which tied Ito to the club with a contract until June 2025.

In August 2023, he extended his contract with Stuttgart until June 2027. In the 2023–24 season, he played a crucial role in his club's runner-up finish and qualification to the Champions League.

=== Bayern Munich ===
On 13 June 2024, Ito signed for fellow Bundesliga club Bayern Munich until 2028, after they had triggered his release clause of an estimated €30 million. However, he sustained a metatarsal fracture during the summer preseason which kept him sidelined for the first half of the 2024–25 season. He made his debut for the club on 12 February 2025, during a 2–1 away victory over Celtic in the Champions League knockout phase play-offs. Later that month, on 23 February, he scored his first goal in a 4–0 victory over Eintracht Frankfurt. A month later, on 29 March, he suffered another metatarsal fracture during a 3–2 victory over St. Pauli, ruling him out for the remainder of the 2024–25 season. Later that year, on 22 November, he made his comeback from a lengthy injury absence, recording an assist as a substitute in a 6–2 victory over SC Freiburg.

== Personal life ==
A white patch caused by vitiligo is visible on Ito's right eyebrow.

== International career ==
Ito played for the youth teams of Japan, including the U23 team during the 2018 AFC Championship, the U19 team in the 2018 AFC Championship, and the U20 team in the 2019 FIFA World Cup.

Ito made his debut for the senior Japan national team on 2 June 2022, during a 4–1 friendly win over Paraguay. Later that year, on 1 November, he was selected in 26-man squad for the 2022 FIFA World Cup in Qatar.

He scored his first goal for Japan against Peru on 20 June 2023 during the Kirin Challenge Cup. On 1 January 2024, he was called up for the 2023 AFC Asian Cup.

On 15 May 2026, Itō was selected in the 26-man squad for the 2026 FIFA World Cup.

== Career statistics ==
=== Club ===
As of match played 7 November 2026

Appearances and goals by club, season and competition
Club	Season	League			National cup (Note: Includes Emperor's Cup, DFB-Pokal)		League cup (Note: Includes J.League Cup)		Continental		Other		Total	
Club	Season	Division	Apps	Goals	Apps	Goals	Apps	Goals	Apps	Goals	Apps	Goals	Apps	Goals
Júbilo Iwata	2018	J1 League	1	0	1	0	4	0	—		—		6	0
Júbilo Iwata	2020	J2 League	37	2	0	0	0	0	—		—		37	2
Júbilo Iwata	2021	J2 League	20	2	0	0	0	0	—		—		20	2
Júbilo Iwata	Total		58	4	1	0	4	0	—		—		63	4
Nagoya Grampus (loan)	2019	J1 League	2	0	1	0	6	0	—		—		9	0
VfB Stuttgart (loan)	2021–22	Bundesliga	29	1	2	0	—		—		—		31	1
VfB Stuttgart	2022–23	Bundesliga	30	1	5	0	—		—		2 (Note: Appearances in Bundesliga promotion play-offs)	0	37	1
VfB Stuttgart	2023–24	Bundesliga	26	0	3	0	—		—		—		29	0
VfB Stuttgart	Total		85	2	10	0	—		—		2	0	97	2
Bayern Munich	2024–25	Bundesliga	6	1	0	0	—		2 (Note: Appearance in UEFA Champions League)	0	0	0	8	1
Bayern Munich	2025–26	Bundesliga	16	1	3	0	—		4	0	0	0	23	1
Bayern Munich	2026–27	Bundesliga	2	0	1	0	—		2	0	0	0	5	0
Bayern Munich	Total		24	2	4	0	—		8	0	0	0	36	2
Career total			169	8	16	0	17	0	1	0	2	0	205	8

=== International ===
As of match played 14 November 2026

Appearances and goals by national team and year
National team	Year	Apps	Goals
Japan	2022	7	0
Japan	2023	6	1
Japan	2024	6	0
Japan	2025	2	0
Japan	2026	12	0
Total		33	1

Scores and results list Japan's goal tally first.

List of international goals scored by Hiroki Ito
No.	Date	Venue	Opponent	Score	Result	Competition
1.	20 June 2023	Panasonic Stadium Suita, Suita, Japan	Peru	1–0	4–1	2023 Kirin Challenge Cup

== Honours ==
Júbilo Iwata

- J2 League: 2021

Bayern Munich

- Bundesliga: 2024–25, 2025–26
- DFB-Pokal: 2025–26
- Franz Beckenbauer Supercup: 2026

Japan U19

- AFC U-19 Championship third place: 2018

Individual

- Bundesliga Rookie of the Month: November 2021
