= Fabian Bredlow =

German footballer

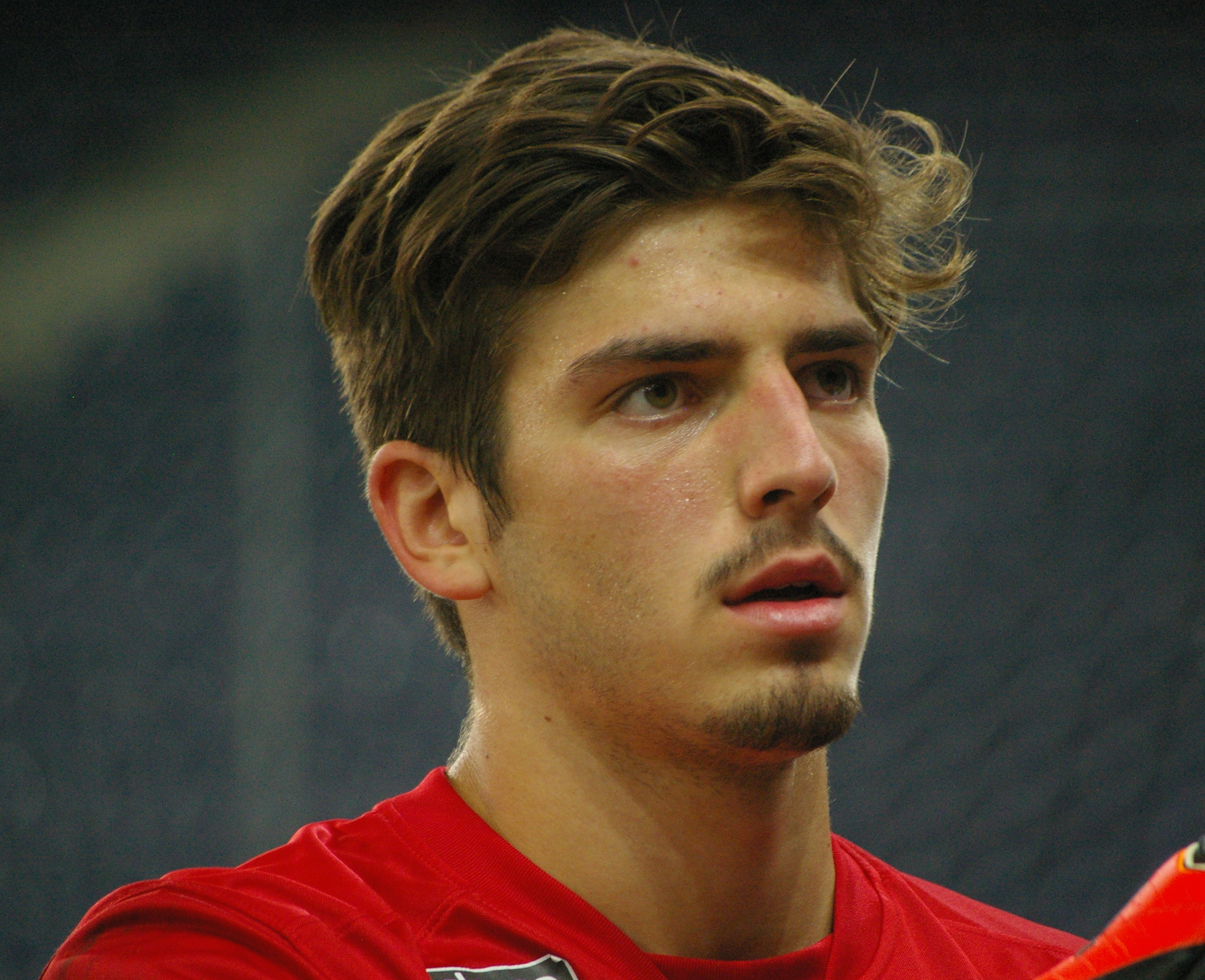
- Bredlow with Liefering in 2014

Personal information
- Full name: Fabian Bredlow
- Date of birth: 2 March 1995 (age 31)
- Place of birth: Berlin, Germany
- Height: 1.90 m (6 ft 3 in)
- Position: Goalkeeper

Team information
- Current team: VfB Stuttgart
- Number: 1

Youth career
- –2012: Hertha Zehlendorf
- 2012–2014: RB Leipzig

Senior career*
Years	Team	Apps	(Gls)
2014–2015	RB Leipzig	0	(0)
2014–2015	→ Liefering (loan)	29	(0)
2015–2017	Hallescher FC	68	(0)
2017–2019	1. FC Nürnberg	35	(0)
2017	1. FC Nürnberg II	1	(0)
2019–	VfB Stuttgart	32	(0)

International career^{‡}
2013	Germany U19	1	(0)
2014–2016	Germany U20	5	(0)
- * Club domestic league appearances and goals as of 20:28, 19 September 2026 (UTC) ‡ National team caps and goals as of 22:02, 28 September 2014 (UTC)

Fabian Bredlow (born 2 March 1995) is a German professional footballer who plays as a goalkeeper for Bundesliga club VfB Stuttgart.

== Club career ==
=== Youth ===
As a youth, he played for Hertha Zehlendorf and RB Leipzig.

=== FC Liefering ===
On 10 June 2014, he was loaned out to FC Red Bull Salzburg before sent to their reserve team FC Liefering.

=== VfB Stuttgart ===
In the summer of 2019, Bredlow moved to VfB Stuttgart.

== Career statistics ==
As of match played 3 November 2026

Appearances and goals by club, season and competition
Club	Season	League			National cup (Note: Includes DFB-Pokal)		Europe		Other		Total	
Club	Season	Division	Apps	Goals	Apps	Goals	Apps	Goals	Apps	Goals	Apps	Goals
RB Leipzig II	2012–13	Sachsenliga	1	0	—		—		—		1	0
RB Leipzig II	2013–14	Sachsenliga	1	0	—		—		—		1	0
RB Leipzig II	Total		2	0	—		—		—		2	0
Liefering	2014–15	Austrian 2. Liga	29	0	0	0	—		—		29	0
Hallescher FC	2015–16	3. Liga	35	0	2	0	—		—		37	0
Hallescher FC	2016–17	3. Liga	33	0	2	0	—		—		35	0
Hallescher FC	Total		68	0	4	0	—		—		72	0
1. FC Nürnberg II	2017–18	Regionalliga Bayern	1	0	—		—		—		1	0
1. FC Nürnberg	2017–18	2. Bundesliga	22	0	1	0	—		0	0	23	0
1. FC Nürnberg	2018–19	2. Bundesliga	13	0	1	0	—		—		14	0
1. FC Nürnberg	Total		35	0	2	0	—		0	0	37	0
VfB Stuttgart	2019–20	2. Bundesliga	4	0	3	0	—		—		7	0
VfB Stuttgart	2020–21	Bundesliga	1	0	2	0	—		—		3	0
VfB Stuttgart	2021–22	Bundesliga	4	0	2	0	—		—		6	0
VfB Stuttgart	2022–23	Bundesliga	15	0	4	0	—		0	0	19	0
VfB Stuttgart	2023–24	Bundesliga	4	0	0	0	—		—		4	0
VfB Stuttgart	2024–25	Bundesliga	0	0	2	0	1 (Note: Appearances in UEFA Champions League)	0	0	0	3	0
VfB Stuttgart	2025–26	Bundesliga	0	0	2	0	1 (Note: Appearance in UEFA Europa League)	0	1 (Note: Appearance in Franz Beckenbauer Supercup)	0	4	0
VfB Stuttgart	2026–27	Bundesliga	4	0	2	0	3	0	—		9	0
VfB Stuttgart	Total		32	0	17	0	5	0	1	0	55	0
Career total			167	0	23	0	5	0	1	0	196	0

== Honours ==
VfB Stuttgart

- DFB-Pokal: 2024–25
