= Wataru Endo =

Japanese footballer (born 1993)

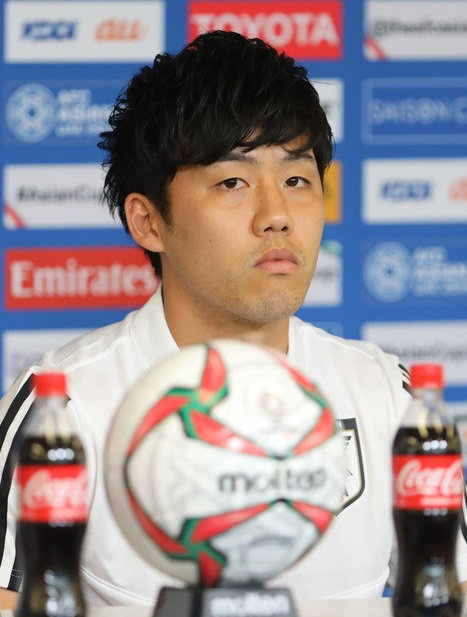
- Endo with Japan at the 2019 AFC Asian Cup pre-match conference

Personal information
- Full name: Wataru Endo
- Date of birth: 9 February 1993 (age 33)
- Place of birth: Totsuka-ku, Yokohama, Kanagawa, Japan
- Height: 1.78 m (5 ft 10 in)
- Positions: Defensive midfielder; centre-back

Team information
- Current team: Liverpool
- Number: 3

Youth career
- 1999–2004: Minamitotsuka FC
- 2005–2007: Minamitotsuka Junior High School
- 2008–2010: Shonan Bellmare

Senior career*
Years	Team	Apps	(Gls)
2010–2015	Shonan Bellmare	158	(23)
2016–2018	Urawa Red Diamonds	75	(5)
2018–2020	Sint-Truiden	29	(2)
2019–2020	→ VfB Stuttgart (loan)	21	(1)
2020–2023	VfB Stuttgart	99	(12)
2023–	Liverpool	57	(1)

International career^{‡}
2012	Japan U19	4	(0)
2015–2016	Japan U23	11	(2)
2021	Japan Olympic (O.P.)	6	(0)
2015–2026	Japan	73	(4)
Medal record
Men's football
Representing Japan
AFC Asian Cup
Runner-up	2019
AFC U-23 Championship
Gold medal – first place	2016
- * Club domestic league appearances and goals as of 22:14, 11 February 2026 (UTC) ‡ National team caps and goals as of 12:42, 31 May 2026 (UTC)

Wataru Endo (遠藤 航, Endō Wataru; born 9 February 1993) is a Japanese professional footballer who plays as a defensive midfielder or a centre-back for Premier League club Liverpool.

Endo began his career at J1 League club Shonan Bellmare before moving to Urawa Red Diamonds in 2016, where he won the league title and the 2017 AFC Champions League. In 2018, he joined Sint-Truiden of the Belgian Pro League, before being loaned to Bundesliga club VfB Stuttgart in 2019. He signed permanently with Stuttgart in April 2020, captaining them during his final season in Germany. Endo joined Liverpool in August 2023.

Endo made his debut for the Japan national team in 2015, and has since made over 70 appearances for the national team, including in two FIFA World Cups and two AFC Asian Cups. He was designated captain of the national team in June 2023. Endo announced his retirement from international football in June 2026 shortly following the beginning of the 2026 FIFA World Cup.

== Club career ==
=== Shonan Bellmare ===
Endo began his professional career with Shonan Bellmare. After being relegated in 2013, he would help Shonan regain promotion back to the J1 League, scoring seven goals in 38 league matches as they won the 2014 J.League Division 2 title. His form continued into the following season, where he scored four goals in 31 league matches and helped his side to a comfortable 8th-placed finish.

Endo recorded a total of 23 goals in 167 matches during his tenure at the club.

=== Urawa Red Diamonds ===
Endo's performances were noticed and he was quickly signed by fellow J1 League side Urawa Red Diamonds, who had finished as runners-up the previous season. In his first campaign with his new club, Endo claimed the 2016 J.League Cup, scoring the winning penalty in the final shoot-out. The following season, he won the 2017 Suruga Bank Championship, as well as the greatest honour in Asian football, the 2017 AFC Champions League.

Throughout his time at Urawa Red Diamonds, Endo accumulated a total of six goals in 109 matches.

=== Sint-Truiden ===
Endo joined Belgian Pro League outfit Sint-Truiden in 2018, playing one year at the club and scoring two goals.

=== VfB Stuttgart ===
On 13 August 2019, Endo was loaned out to German club VfB Stuttgart until the end of the season. In April 2020, Stuttgart signed Endo permanently. On 26 November 2020, Endō extended his contract with VfB Stuttgart until June 2024.

On 25 February 2022, Endo scored Stuttgart's only goal in a 2–1 loss to 1899 Hoffenheim. He scored again in the club's 3–2 win over Borussia Mönchengladbach. On 14 May 2022, Endo scored the winning goal in stoppage time of a 2–1 victory against 1. FC Köln to save Stuttgart from the relegation play-offs and secure their place in the 2022–23 Bundesliga.

Endo's final appearance for Stuttgart was in a DFB-Pokal first round match against TSG Balingen on 12 August 2023, where he scored the fourth goal of a 4–0 win.

=== Liverpool ===
On 18 August 2023, Endo signed a four-year deal with Premier League club Liverpool for a fee of £16 million. He became just the second male Japanese footballer to play for the club after Takumi Minamino who joined the club in 2020. The following day, he made his Premier League and club debut against Bournemouth, coming on as a substitute in the 63rd minute. Endo was praised for his performance, only misplacing one pass. On 27 August, Endo made his first Liverpool and Premier League start in an away victory against Newcastle United. On 27 September, he made his first full Anfield appearance and contributed to Liverpool's victory in the third round of the EFL Cup against Leicester City, assisting Dominik Szoboszlai for the deciding goal. On 26 October 2023, Endo scored his first goal for Liverpool in a 5–1 win over Toulouse at Anfield in the UEFA Europa League.

On 3 December 2023, Endo scored his first Premier League goal, an equaliser just four minutes after being substituted on, in a 4–3 victory over Fulham. Afterwards, he started the next seven fixtures as Liverpool achieved victories against Sheffield United, Crystal Palace, West Ham United and Burnley. In recognition of his efforts, Endo was voted Liverpool's Player of the Month for December. He played the full 120 minutes of the 2024 EFL Cup final, in which Liverpool defeated Chelsea 1–0, earning Endo his first trophy with the club.

In the 2024–25 season, Endo made 20 appearances in the Premier League and was part of the Liverpool team that won the title that season. In doing so, Endo became only the fourth Japanese player to win the Premier League after Shinji Kagawa, Shinji Okazaki and Takumi Minamino.

== International career ==
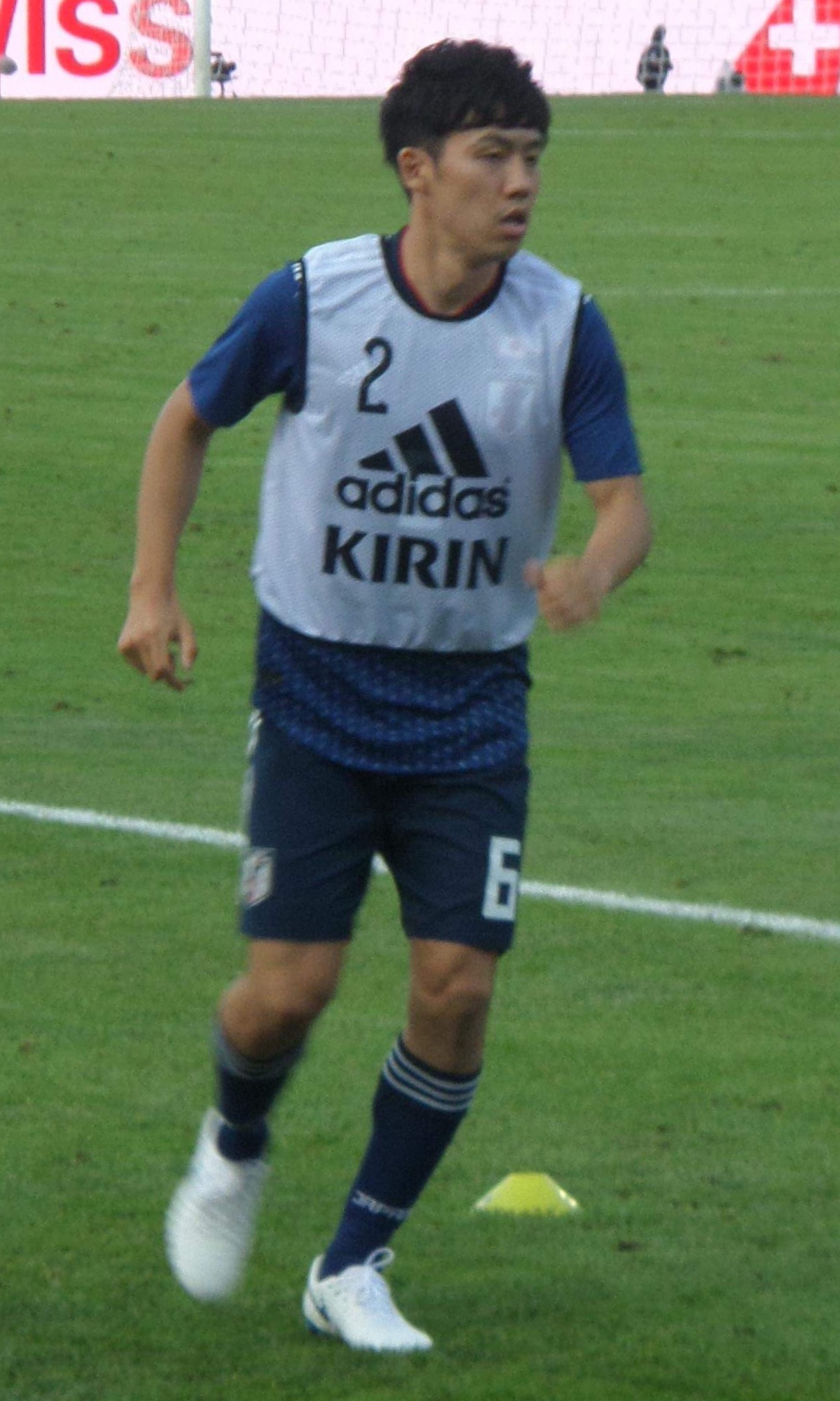
Endo training with Japan in 2018

On 23 July 2015, Japan's coach Vahid Halilhodžić called Endo up to the squad for the upcoming 2015 EAFF East Asian Cup. On 2 August 2015, he made his international debut in the opening game of the competition in a 2–1 defeat to North Korea. He was named in Japan's squad for the 2018 FIFA World Cup in Russia, although he did not play in any of their matches.

Endō was again in the Japan squad for the 2022 FIFA World Cup in Qatar, where the team reached the round of 16 before losing to Croatia on penalties.

As of September 2024, Endo has scored four international goals. He was named captain of the national team in June 2023. In January 2024, he was named for the 2023 AFC Asian Cup final squads, and scored a late goal for Japan in the 2–1 loss against Iraq in their second group match.

On 15 May 2026, he was named in Japan's 26-man squad for the 2026 FIFA World Cup. However, he withdrew from the squad due to a foot injury that he had sustained in February and was replaced by Shuto Machino on 11 June. Following his withdrawal, Endo announced his retirement from international football.

== Style of play ==
Endo mainly plays as a defensive midfielder, but can also play as a centre-back. In January 2025 he played as a centre-back for Liverpool in the 4–0 win against Accrington Stanley in the FA Cup, and he said that he played as a defender from the age of 18 to 25. His ability to read the game has helped him gain success in the Bundesliga, and he has gained reputation as a prolific ball-winner. While playing in Germany, he topped the Bundesliga for most duels, and second for possession won and tackles.

The Premier League's official website states that at Liverpool, Endo's biggest role is picking up loose balls and recycling possession efficiently. He is also able to make active plays when needed, forcing turnovers and making tackles.

== Personal life ==
In June 2025, Endo launched a non-profit organisation called "SEKAI NI WATARU Project". The organisation's purpose is to provide a development program and scholarship (including study abroad) for youths aged 7–12, with a focus on developing critical and independent thinking. Endo's brother is a representative director of the organisation. The name of the project translates into "across the world" and is a pun on his name, as it shares the same reading as the word "to navigate".

== Career statistics ==
=== Club ===
As of match played 11 February 2026

Appearances and goals by club, season and competition
Club	Season	League			National cup (Note: Includes Emperor's Cup, Belgian Cup, DFB-Pokal, FA Cup)		League cup (Note: Includes J.League Cup, EFL Cup)		Continental		Other		Total	
Club	Season	Division	Apps	Goals	Apps	Goals	Apps	Goals	Apps	Goals	Apps	Goals	Apps	Goals
Shonan Bellmare	2010	J.League Division 1	6	1	0	0	1	0	—		—		7	1
Shonan Bellmare	2011	J2 League	34	1	4	0	—		—		—		38	1
Shonan Bellmare	2012	J2 League	32	7	1	0	—		—		—		33	7
Shonan Bellmare	2013	J1 League	17	3	1	0	0	0	—		—		18	3
Shonan Bellmare	2014	J2 League	38	7	1	0	—		—		—		39	7
Shonan Bellmare	2015	J1 League	31	4	0	0	1	0	—		—		32	4
Shonan Bellmare	Total		158	23	7	0	2	0	—		—		167	23
Urawa Red Diamonds	2016	J1 League	29	0	1	0	3	0	6 (Note: Appearances in AFC Champions League)	0	0	0	39	0
Urawa Red Diamonds	2017	J1 League	30	3	1	0	2	0	11	1	3 (Note: One appearance in Japanese Super Cup, one appearance in J.League Cup / Copa Sudamericana Championship, one appearance in FIFA Club World Cup)	0	47	4
Urawa Red Diamonds	2018	J1 League	16	2	4	0	4	0	—		—		24	2
Urawa Red Diamonds	Total		75	5	6	0	9	0	17	1	3	0	110	6
Sint-Truiden	2018–19	Belgian Pro League	26	2	2	0	—		—		—		28	2
Sint-Truiden	2019–20	Belgian Pro League	3	0	—		—		—		—		3	0
Sint-Truiden	Total		29	2	2	0	—		—		—		31	2
VfB Stuttgart (loan)	2019–20	2. Bundesliga	21	1	1	0	—		—		—		22	1
VfB Stuttgart	2020–21	Bundesliga	33	3	3	0	—		—		—		36	3
VfB Stuttgart	2021–22	Bundesliga	33	4	1	0	—		—		—		34	4
VfB Stuttgart	2022–23	Bundesliga	33	5	5	1	—		—		2 (Note: Appearances in Bundesliga relegation play-offs)	0	40	6
VfB Stuttgart	2023–24	Bundesliga	0	0	1	1	—		—		—		1	1
VfB Stuttgart	VfB Stuttgart total		120	13	11	2	—		—		2	0	133	15
Liverpool	2023–24	Premier League	29	1	1	0	4	0	9 (Note: Appearances in UEFA Europa League)	1	—		43	2
Liverpool	2024–25	Premier League	20	0	2	0	4	0	6 (Note: Appearance(s) in UEFA Champions League)	0	—		32	0
Liverpool	2025–26	Premier League	8	0	0	0	2	0	1	0	1 (Note: Appearance in FA Community Shield)	0	12	0
Liverpool	Total		57	1	3	0	10	0	16	1	1	0	87	2
Career total			439	44	29	2	21	0	33	2	6	0	528	48

=== International ===
As of match played 31 May 2026

Appearances and goals by national team and year
National team	Year	Apps	Goals
Japan	2015	5	0
Japan	2016	2	0
Japan	2017	4	0
Japan	2018	4	0
Japan	2019	7	1
Japan	2020	3	0
Japan	2021	9	1
Japan	2022	13	0
Japan	2023	8	0
Japan	2024	12	2
Japan	2025	5	0
Japan	2026	1	0
Total		73	4

Scores and results list Japan's goal tally first, score column indicates score after each Endo goal

List of international goals scored by Wataru Endo
No.	Date	Venue	Cap	Opponent	Score	Result	Competition
1	10 October 2019	Saitama Stadium 2002, Saitama, Japan	21	Mongolia	5–0	6–0	2022 FIFA World Cup qualification
2	25 March 2021	Nissan Stadium, Yokohama, Japan	26	South Korea	3–0	3–0	Friendly
3	19 January 2024	Education City Stadium, Al Rayyan, Qatar	57	Iraq	1–2	1–2	2023 AFC Asian Cup
4	5 September 2024	Saitama Stadium 2002, Saitama, Japan	63	China	1–0	7–0	2026 FIFA World Cup qualification

== Honours ==
Shonan Bellmare

- J.League Division 2: 2014

Urawa Red Diamonds

- J.League Cup: 2016
- Suruga Bank Championship: 2017
- AFC Champions League Elite: 2017

Liverpool

- Premier League: 2024–25
- EFL Cup: 2023–24; runner-up: 2024–25

Japan U23

- AFC U-23 Asian Cup: 2016

Japan

- AFC Asian Cup runner-up: 2019

Individual

- J2 League Monthly MVP: April 2014
- Japan Pro-Footballers Association Best XI: 2022, 2023, 2024
- AFC Asian Cup Team of the Tournament: 2023
- IFFHS Asian Men's Team of the Year: 2024
