= Naouirou Ahamada =

French footballer (born 2002)

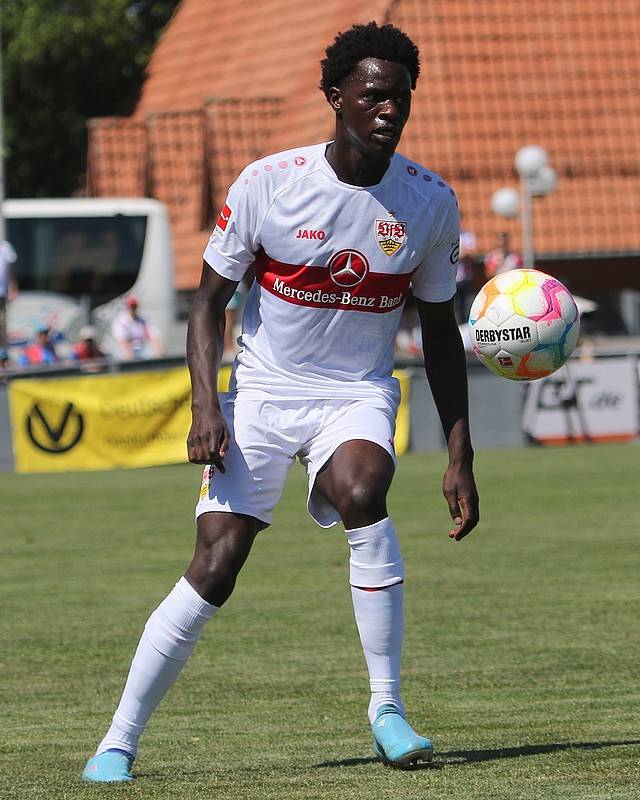
- Ahamada playing for VfB Stuttgart in 2022

Personal information
- Full name: Naouirou Ahamada
- Date of birth: 29 March 2002 (age 24)
- Place of birth: Marseille, France
- Height: 1.83 m (6 ft 0 in)
- Positions: Central midfielder; wide midfielder

Team information
- Current team: Auxerre
- Number: 8

Youth career
- 2010–2011: JO Saint Gabriel
- 2011–2016: Sporting Club Bel Air
- 2016–2018: Istres
- 2018–2020: Juventus

Senior career*
Years	Team	Apps	(Gls)
2020–2021	Juventus Next Gen	2	(0)
2020–2021	→ VfB Stuttgart (loan)	6	(0)
2020–2021	→ VfB Stuttgart II (loan)	6	(0)
2021–2023	VfB Stuttgart	20	(2)
2021–2022	VfB Stuttgart II	3	(0)
2023–2026	Crystal Palace	28	(0)
2024–2025	→ Rennes (loan)	3	(0)
2026–	Auxerre	15	(0)

International career
2017	France U16	5	(2)
2019	France U17	6	(0)
2019–2020	France U18	3	(1)
- * Club domestic league appearances and goals as of 20 May 2026

Naouirou Ahamada (born 29 March 2002) is a French professional footballer who plays as a central midfielder or wide midfielder for Ligue 1 club Auxerre.

== Club career ==
After starting his career in Italy for the youth academy of Juventus, Ahamada moved to German club VfB Stuttgart on loan on 5 October 2020 until the end of that season with an option to buy. On 1 July 2021, the option was exercised and Stuttgart signed him permanently.

On 31 January 2023, Ahamada was signed on a three-and-a-half-year deal by Premier League club Crystal Palace for £9.7 million. He made his debut for the club on 4 February, coming on as a substitute for Cheick Doucouré in a 2–1 away loss to Manchester United.

On 30 August 2024, Ahamada joined French club Rennes on loan until the end of the 2024–25 season. On 7 January 2026, he joined Auxerre on a deal lasting until June 2027, with an option for a two-season extension.

== International career ==
Ahamada was born in Marseille, France, and is of Comorian and Malagasy descent. He has played internationally at youth level for France.

== Career statistics ==
As of match played 15 January 2025

Appearances and goals by club, season and competition
Club	Season	League			National cup (Note: Includes DFB-Pokal, FA Cup, Coupe de France)		League cup (Note: Includes EFL Cup)		Other		Total	
Club	Season	Division	Apps	Goals	Apps	Goals	Apps	Goals	Apps	Goals	Apps	Goals
VfB Stuttgart II (loan)	2020–21	Regionalliga	6	0	–		–		–		6	0
VfB Stuttgart II	2021–22	Regionalliga	3	0	–		–		–		3	0
VfB Stuttgart II	2022–23	Regionalliga	0	0	–		–		–		0	0
VfB Stuttgart II	Total		3	0	0	0	0	0	0	0	3	0
VfB Stuttgart (loan)	2020–21	Bundesliga	6	0	0	0	–		–		6	0
VfB Stuttgart	2021–22	Bundesliga	3	0	1	0	–		–		4	0
VfB Stuttgart	2022–23	Bundesliga	17	2	1	0	–		–		18	2
VfB Stuttgart	Total		20	2	2	0	0	0	0	0	22	2
Crystal Palace	2022–23	Premier League	8	0	—		–		–		8	0
Crystal Palace	2023–24	Premier League	20	0	2	0	1	0	–		23	0
Crystal Palace	Total		28	0	2	0	1	0	0	0	31	0
Rennes (loan)	2024–25	Ligue 1	3	0	2	0	–		–		5	0
Career total			66	2	6	0	1	0	0	0	73	2
