= Clinton Mola =

English footballer

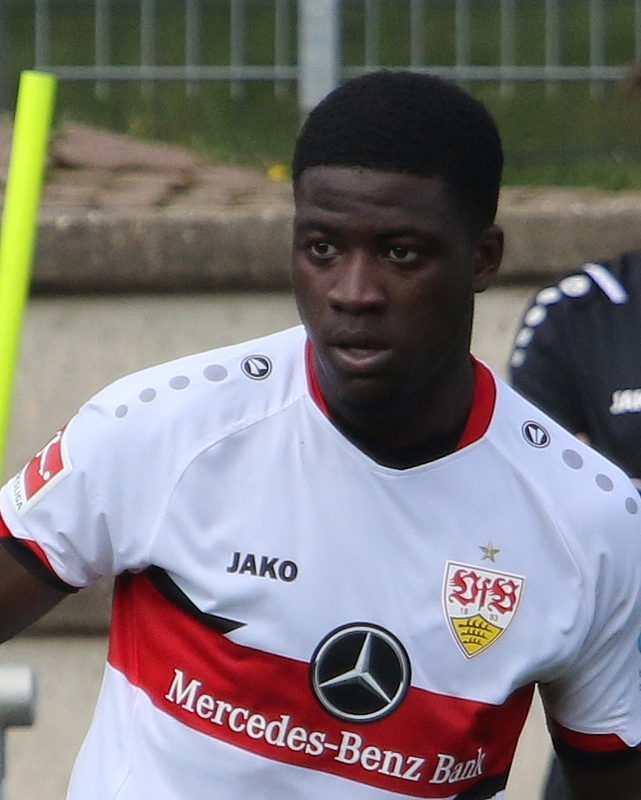
- Mola with Stuttgart in 2021

Personal information
- Full name: Clinton Lemere Mola
- Date of birth: 15 March 2001 (age 25)
- Place of birth: Camden, England
- Height: 1.83 m (6 ft 0 in)
- Positions: Defender; defensive midfielder

Team information
- Current team: Bristol Rovers
- Number: 6

Youth career
- AC United
- 2015–2020: Chelsea

Senior career*
Years	Team	Apps	(Gls)
2020–2023	VfB Stuttgart	12	(0)
2022	VfB Stuttgart II	2	(0)
2022–2023	→ Blackburn Rovers (loan)	4	(0)
2023–2024	Reading	30	(0)
2024–	Bristol Rovers	82	(2)

International career^{‡}
2016–2017	England U16	5	(0)
2017–2018	England U17	5	(1)
2018–2019	England U18	7	(1)
2019	England U19	6	(0)
2021–2022	England U20	3	(1)
2021	England U21	1	(0)
- * Club domestic league appearances and goals as of 18:29, 21 November 2026 (UTC) ‡ National team caps and goals as of 10:40, 30 March 2022 (UTC)

Clinton Lemere Mola (born 15 March 2001) is an English professional footballer who plays as a defender or defensive midfielder for EFL League Two club Bristol Rovers.

== Club career ==
Mola started his football career at grassroots club AC United, then joined Chelsea at the under-14 level following a successful trail. On 31 January 2020, Mola moved to VfB Stuttgart, signing a 4.5 year contract. Mola made his debut for Stuttgart on 5 February 2020 in the 2019–20 DFB-Pokal against Bayer 04 Leverkusen. He suffered a hip injury later that season, which ruled him out for the entire 2020–21 season.

On 1 September 2022, Mola signed for EFL Championship club Blackburn Rovers on a season-long loan deal including an option to buy. He made his debut on 13 September against Watford. Blackburn Rovers opted against activating the buyout option in his loan contract at the end of the season.

On 26 August 2023, Mola's contract with VfB Stuttgart was terminated by mutual consent.

On 1 September 2023 Mola signed a one-year contract with Reading.

On 8 May 2024, the club announced he would be released in the summer once his contract expired.

=== Bristol Rovers ===
On 25 June 2024, Mola agreed to join fellow League One side Bristol Rovers on a three-year deal with the option for a further season. On 5 October 2024, he scored a first senior goal, volleying home his side's second goal as they came from behind to defeat Burton Albion. During the second-half of the 2024–25 season, he found game-time more limited, particularly following the managerial appointment of Iñigo Calderón, however he returned to the first-team from March 2025 as the Gas were relegated.

In January 2026, with Rovers struggling in League Two, new manager Steve Evans moved Mola into a midfield position where he began to impress, being described by local press as a "player reborn". In April 2026, ahead of the final game of the season, he admitted that this move into midfield had turned around his career with the Gas.

== International career ==
Born in England, Mola is of Congolese descent. He is a youth international for England.

On 6 September 2021, Mola made a goalscoring debut for the England U20s during a 6–1 victory over Romania U20s at St. George's Park.

On 4 October 2021, Mola received his first call up to the England U21s as an injury replacement for Levi Colwill. On 16 November 2021, Mola made his U21 debut during a 3–2 defeat to Georgia in Batumi.

== Personal life ==
In March 2026, Mola was told to "grow up" by a magistrate after telling a court he did not know he needed car insurance to drive in the UK. He was handed a three-year ban and fined £2,238 having been pulled over in November of the previous year.

== Career statistics ==
=== Club ===
As of match played 21 November 2026

Appearances and goals by club, season and competition
Club	Season	League			National Cup		League Cup		Other		Total	
Club	Season	Division	Apps	Goals	Apps	Goals	Apps	Goals	Apps	Goals	Apps	Goals
VfB Stuttgart	2019–20	2. Bundesliga	8	0	1	0	–		0	0	9	0
VfB Stuttgart	2020–21	Bundesliga	0	0	0	0	–		0	0	0	0
VfB Stuttgart	2021–22	Bundesliga	3	0	0	0	–		0	0	3	0
VfB Stuttgart	2022–23	Bundesliga	1	0	1	0	–		0	0	2	0
VfB Stuttgart	Total		12	2	0	0	0	0	0	14	0	
VfB Stuttgart II	2021–22	Regionalliga Südwest	2	0	0	0	–		–		2	0
Blackburn Rovers (loan)	2022–23	Championship	4	0	0	0	2	0	0	0	6	0
Reading	2023–24	League One	30	0	1	0	0	0	4 (Note: Appearance(s) in EFL Trophy)	0	35	0
Bristol Rovers	2024–25	League One	34	1	2	0	1	0	0	0	37	1
Bristol Rovers	2025–26	League Two	32	0	2	0	1	0	4	0	39	0
Bristol Rovers	2026–27	League Two	16	1	1	0	1	0	0	0	18	1
Bristol Rovers	Total		82	2	5	0	3	0	4	0	94	2
Career total			130	2	8	0	5	0	8	0	151	2
