= Pascal Stenzel =

German footballer

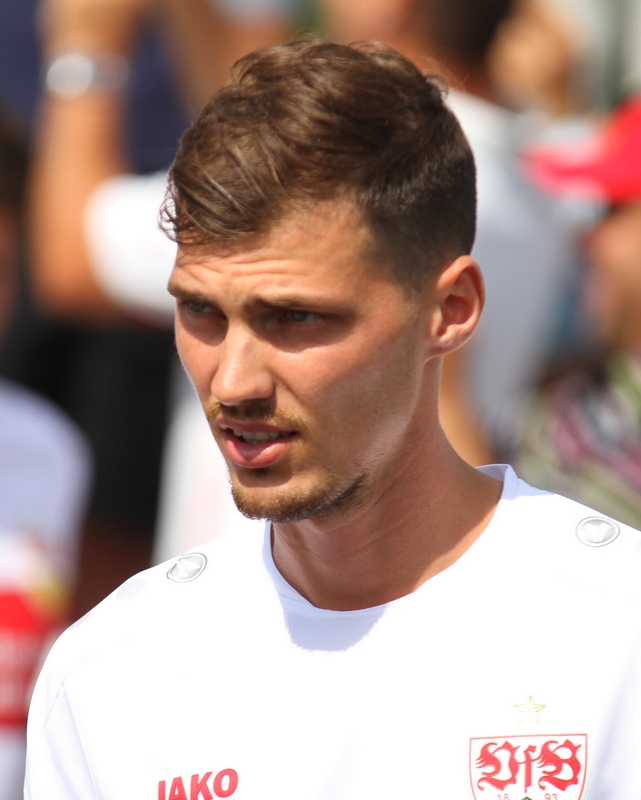
- Stenzel with VfB Stuttgart in 2019

Personal information
- Date of birth: 20 March 1996 (age 30)
- Place of birth: Bünde, Germany
- Height: 1.83 m (6 ft 0 in)
- Position: Right-back

Youth career
- –2011: Arminia Bielefeld
- 2011–2013: VfL Osnabrück
- 2013–2015: Borussia Dortmund

Senior career*
Years	Team	Apps	(Gls)
2014–2017	Borussia Dortmund II	10	(0)
2015–2017	Borussia Dortmund	0	(0)
2016–2017	→ SC Freiburg (loan)	30	(1)
2017–2020	SC Freiburg	46	(1)
2018	SC Freiburg II	1	(0)
2019–2020	→ VfB Stuttgart (loan)	34	(0)
2020–2026	VfB Stuttgart	86	(0)

International career^{‡}
2014	Germany U19	1	(0)
2015–2017	Germany U20	7	(0)
2017–2019	Germany U21	8	(0)
- * Club domestic league appearances and goals as of 30 November 2025 ‡ National team caps and goals as of 7 July 2023

Pascal Stenzel (born 20 March 1996) is a German professional footballer who plays as a right-back.

== Club career ==
=== Borussia Dortmund ===
Stenzel is a Borussia Dortmund youth exponent, who played for the reserve team. He made his professional debut in the 3. Liga at 2 August 2014 against Holstein Kiel.

=== SC Freiburg ===
On 29 January 2016, Stenzel joined SC Freiburg on a loan until 30 June 2017. In April, he signed permanently with Freiburg, agreeing to a contract reportedly running until 2021.

=== VfB Stuttgart ===
For the 2019–20 season, Stenzel was loaned out to VfB Stuttgart. On 1 July 2020, Stenzel moved permanently to Stuttgart and signed a contract until June 2024.

== Career statistics ==
As of match played 30 November 2025

Appearances and goals by club, season and competition
Club	Season	League			DFB-Pokal		Europe		Other		Total	
Club	Season	Division	Apps	Goals	Apps	Goals	Apps	Goals	Apps	Goals	Apps	Goals
Borussia Dortmund II	2014–15	3. Liga	2	0	—		—		—		2	0
Borussia Dortmund II	2015–16	Regionalliga West	9	0	—		—		—		9	0
Borussia Dortmund II	Total		11	0	—		—		—		11	0
Borussia Dortmund	2015–16	Bundesliga	0	0	0	0	1 (Note: Appearances in UEFA Europa League)	0	—		1	0
SC Freiburg (loan)	2015–16	2. Bundesliga	11	0	0	0	—		—		11	0
SC Freiburg (loan)	2016–17	Bundesliga	19	1	0	0	—		—		19	1
SC Freiburg	2017–18	Bundesliga	25	1	3	0	2	0	—		30	1
SC Freiburg	2018–19	Bundesliga	21	0	2	0	0	0	—		23	0
SC Freiburg	Freiburg total		76	2	5	0	2	0	—		83	2
SC Freiburg II	2018–19	Regionalliga Südwest	1	0	—		—		—		1	0
VfB Stuttgart (loan)	2019–20	Bundesliga	34	0	3	0	—		—		37	0
VfB Stuttgart	2020–21	Bundesliga	23	0	1	0	—		—		24	0
VfB Stuttgart	2021–22	Bundesliga	16	0	1	0	—		—		17	0
VfB Stuttgart	2022–23	Bundesliga	12	0	3	1	—		—		15	1
VfB Stuttgart	2023–24	Bundesliga	23	0	2	0	—		—		25	0
VfB Stuttgart	2024–25	Bundesliga	10	0	3	0	5 (Note: Appearances in UEFA Champions League)	0	1 (Note: Appearance in DFL Supercup)	0	19	0
VfB Stuttgart	2025–26	Bundesliga	2	0	0	0	0	0	0	0	2	0
VfB Stuttgart	Stuttgart total		120	0	13	1	5	0	1	0	139	1
Career total			208	2	18	1	8	0	1	0	234	3

== Honours ==
VfB Stuttgart

- DFB-Pokal: 2024–25
