= Momo Cissé =

Guinean-French footballer

Personal information
- Full name: Alkhaly Momo Cissé
- Date of birth: 17 October 2002 (age 24)
- Place of birth: Conakry, Guinea
- Height: 1.78 m (5 ft 10 in)
- Position: Winger

Team information
- Current team: SJK II
- Number: 17

Youth career
- Vendée Fontenay
- –2017: Paris
- 2017–2019: Le Havre

Senior career*
Years	Team	Apps	(Gls)
2020–2024	VfB Stuttgart	5	(0)
2022–2023	→ Wisła Kraków (loan)	22	(0)
2026–	SJK II	9	(0)

International career^{‡}
2023–	Guinea U23	5	(0)
- * Club domestic league appearances and goals as of 1 November 2026 ‡ National team caps and goals as of 27 June 2023

Alkhaly Momo Cissé (born 17 October 2002) is a Guinean professional footballer who plays as a winger for Ykkösliiga club SJK II.

== Career ==
Cissé joined German club VfB Stuttgart in August 2020. He made his professional debut for the team in the Bundesliga on 19 September 2020, coming on as a substitute in the 78th minute for Roberto Massimo against SC Freiburg, which finished as a 3–2 home loss.

On 16 January 2022, he was loaned out to Polish Ekstraklasa club Wisła Kraków until the end of June 2023.
