= Mateo Klimowicz =

German footballer (born 2000)

Personal information
- Date of birth: 6 July 2000 (age 26)
- Place of birth: Córdoba, Argentina
- Height: 1.81 m (5 ft 11 in)
- Position: Attacking midfielder

Team information
- Current team: Cerro Porteño
- Number: 40

Youth career
- JSG Bergfeld/Parsau/Tülau
- 2007–2008: Borussia Dortmund
- 2008–2009: SuS Kaiserau
- 2009–2010: Kamener SC
- 2011–2017: Instituto

Senior career*
Years	Team	Apps	(Gls)
2017–2019	Instituto	38	(6)
2019–2023	VfB Stuttgart	47	(1)
2022	→ Arminia Bielefeld (loan)	5	(0)
2023	→ Atlético San Luis (loan)	32	(2)
2024–2026	Atlético San Luis	13	(4)
2026–	Cerro Porteño	0	(0)

International career^{‡}
2021	Germany U21	4	(0)
Medal record
UEFA European Under-21 Championship
Gold medal – first place	2021
- * Club domestic league appearances and goals as of 21:03, 7 July 2024 (UTC) ‡ National team caps and goals as of 14:51, 2 June 2021 (UTC)

Mateo Klimowicz (born 6 July 2000) is a professional footballer who plays as an attacking midfielder for División de Honor club Cerro Porteño. Born in Argentina, he played for the Germany national under-21 team.

== Club career ==
Klimowicz trained with Borussia Dortmund's academy at a young age, while his father was playing in Germany. He later joined Instituto's ranks. He appeared professionally twice at the back end of the 2016–17 season in Primera B Nacional, participating in fixtures with Juventud Unida, aged sixteen, and Nueva Chicago as they secured sixth. Klimowicz's first senior goal arrived on 14 October 2017 during a 1–1 home draw with Aldosivi.

On 10 May 2019, VfB Stuttgart announced the signing of Klimowicz ahead of the 2019–20 season; with the midfielder signing a five-year contract. He made his bow as a late substitute in a 2. Bundesliga match with 1. FC Heidenheim on 4 August. They won promotion in his first season, with his Bundesliga debut subsequently arriving on 19 September 2020 against SC Freiburg. He then scored his first goal in German football on 26 September, netting in a 4–1 victory at the Opel Arena versus Mainz 05.

On 1 September 2022, Klimowicz signed with 2. Bundesliga club Arminia Bielefeld on a season long loan.

== International career ==
Klimowicz is eligible to play for Argentina, Germany or – with the obtainment of citizenship – Poland at international level. He received call-ups to train with Argentina at the U15, U17 and U20 levels.

On 15 March 2021, Klimowicz was called up for the 2021 UEFA European Under-21 Championship group stages by Germany; he holds a German passport due to his father's career in German football. He debuted with the German U21 team in a 3–0 win over the Hungary U21 on 25 March 2021.

== Personal life ==
Mateo is the son of former professional footballer Diego Klimowicz, who played for the likes of German clubs VfL Wolfsburg, Borussia Dortmund and VfL Bochum during a span of nine consecutive years. His uncle Javier also played professional football. Klimowicz is of Polish descent via his great-grandfather.

== Career statistics ==
As of 4 July 2024

Appearances and goals by club, season and competition
Club	Season	League			National cup		League cup		Continental		Other		Total	
Club	Season	Division	Apps	Goals	Apps	Goals	Apps	Goals	Apps	Goals	Apps	Goals	Apps	Goals
Instituto	2016–17	Primera B Nacional	2	0	0	0	—		—		0	0	2	0
Instituto	2017–18	Primera B Nacional	19	1	0	0	—		—		1 (Note: Appearance(s) in the Primera B Nacional play-offs)	0	20	1
Instituto	2018–19	Primera B Nacional	16	5	0	0	—		—		0	0	16	5
Instituto	Total		37	6	0	0	—		—		1	0	38	6
VfB Stuttgart	2019–20	2. Bundesliga	7	0	1	0	—		—		0	0	8	0
VfB Stuttgart	2020–21	Bundesliga	25	1	2	0	—		—		0	0	27	1
VfB Stuttgart	2021–22	Bundesliga	15	0	2	1	—		—		—		17	1
VfB Stuttgart	2022–23	Bundesliga	0	0	0	0	—		—		—		0	0
VfB Stuttgart	Total		47	1	5	1	—		—		0	0	52	2
VfB Stuttgart II	2021–22	Regionalliga Südwest	6	1	—		—		—		—		6	1
Arminia Bielefeld (loan)	2022–23	2. Bundesliga	5	0	1	0	—		—		—		6	0
San Luis (loan)	2022–23	Liga MX	16	1	0	0	—		—		—		16	1
San Luis (loan)	2023–24	Liga MX	18	1	—		2	1	—		—		20	2
San Luis (loan)	Total		34	2	0	0	2	1	—		—		36	3
San Luis	2023–24	Liga MX	10	2	0	0	0	0	—		—		10	2
Career total			139	12	6	1	2	1	—		1	0	148	14

== Honours ==
Individual

- Bundesliga Rookie of the Month: October 2020
