= Lilian Egloff =

German professional footballer

Personal information
- Full name: Lilian Niclas Egloff
- Date of birth: 20 August 2002 (age 24)
- Place of birth: Heilbronn, Germany
- Height: 1.82 m (6 ft 0 in)
- Position: Central midfielder

Team information
- Current team: Karlsruher SC
- Number: 25

Youth career
- –2012: TSG Bretzfeld-Rappach
- 2012–2020: VfB Stuttgart

Senior career*
| Years | Team | Apps | (Gls) |
| 2020–2024 | VfB Stuttgart | 24 | (0) |
| 2020–2024 | VfB Stuttgart II | 23 | (2) |
| 2024– | Karlsruher SC | 29 | (6) |

International career^{‡}
| 2017 | Germany U15 | 1 | (1) |
- * Club domestic league appearances and goals as of 18 May 2026 ‡ National team caps and goals as of 6 February 2020

Lilian Niclas Egloff (born 20 August 2002) is a German professional footballer who plays as a central midfielder for 2. Bundesliga club Karlsruher SC.

== Career ==
On 5 February 2020, Egloff made his debut for VfB Stuttgart against Bayer Leverkusen in the 2019–20 DFB-Pokal.

On 20 August 2020, Egloff extended his contract with VfB Stuttgart until June 2024.

On 18 May 2024, VfB Stuttgart announced that Egloff would leave the club after the 2023–24 season when his contract expired.

On 2 September 2024, Egloff signed with Karlsruher SC.

== Personal life ==
Born in Switzerland, Egloff is of Swiss descent.
