= Maxime Awoudja =

German footballer

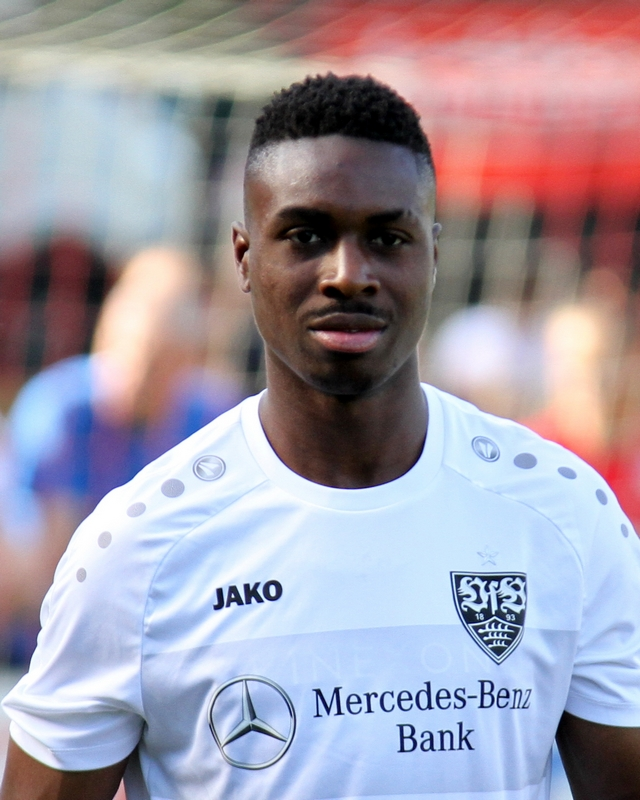
- Awoudja with VfB Stuttgart in 2019

Personal information
- Full name: Maxime Aglago Awoudja
- Date of birth: 2 February 1998 (age 28)
- Place of birth: Munich, Germany
- Height: 1.88 m (6 ft 2 in)
- Position: Centre-back

Team information
- Current team: Rot-Weiß Erfurt
- Number: 6

Youth career
- SpVgg Thalkirchen
- –2007: SV 1880 München
- 2007–2017: Bayern Munich

Senior career*
Years	Team	Apps	(Gls)
2017–2019	Bayern Munich II	47	(8)
2019–2022	VfB Stuttgart II	3	(1)
2019–2022	VfB Stuttgart	2	(0)
2021	→ Türkgücü München (loan)	11	(2)
2021–2022	→ WSG Tirol (loan)	21	(2)
2022–2023	Excelsior	10	(0)
2024–	Rot-Weiß Erfurt	64	(4)

International career
2017	Germany U19	3	(0)
2017	Germany U20	1	(0)
2019	Germany U21	2	(0)
- * Club domestic league appearances and goals as of 23 September 2026

Maxime Aglago Awoudja (born 2 February 1998) is a German professional footballer who plays as a centre-back for Regionalliga Nordost club Rot-Weiß Erfurt. He has represented Germany at U19, U20, and U21 youth levels.

== Career ==
Awoudja made his professional debut for VfB Stuttgart in the 2. Bundesliga on 26 July 2019, coming on as a substitute in the 35th minute for the injured Marcin Kamiński in the home match against Hannover 96. Four minutes later, he scored an own goal to reduce the lead for Stuttgart to 2–1.

On 31 January 2021, Awoudja was loaned to Türkgücü München until the end of the season.

On 31 August 2022, Awoudja signed with Excelsior.

== Personal life ==
Awoudja was born in Munich, Bavaria and is of Togolese descent.
