= Antonis Aidonis =

German footballer (born 2001)

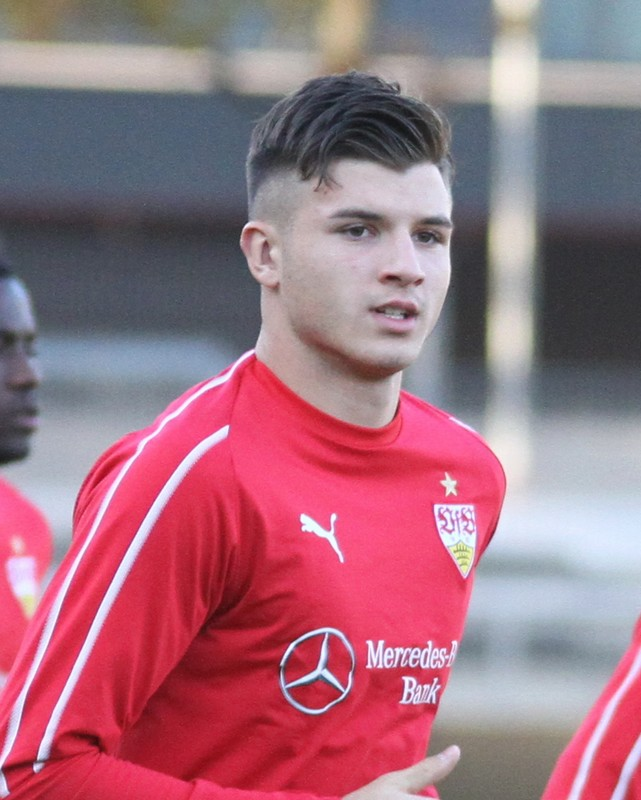
- Aidonis training with VfB Stuttgart in 2018

Personal information
- Date of birth: 22 May 2001 (age 25)
- Place of birth: Neustadt an der Weinstraße, Germany
- Height: 1.85 m (6 ft 1 in)
- Position: Centre-back

Team information
- Current team: Sonnenhof Großaspach
- Number: 15

Youth career
- VfL Neckarau
- TSV Neckarau
- 2012–2018: 1899 Hoffenheim
- 2018–2019: VfB Stuttgart

Senior career*
Years	Team	Apps	(Gls)
2018–2023	VfB Stuttgart	2	(0)
2019–2023	VfB Stuttgart II	54	(0)
2021–2022	→ Dynamo Dresden (loan)	12	(0)
2023	Aris	0	(0)
2024	Borussia Dortmund II	14	(1)
2024–	Sonnenhof Großaspach	56	(3)

International career^{‡}
2016	Germany U15	2	(0)
2016–2017	Germany U16	5	(1)
2017–2018	Germany U17	9	(2)
2018–2019	Germany U18	3	(0)
2019	Germany U19	6	(0)
2020	Germany U20	3	(1)
- * Club domestic league appearances and goals as of 24 June 2026 ‡ National team caps and goals as of 7 October 2020

Antonis Aidonis (Greek: Αντώνης Αηδόνης, born 22 May 2001) is a German professional footballer who plays as a centre-back for Regionalliga Südwest club Sonnenhof Großaspach.

== Club career ==
Aidonis made his professional debut for VfB Stuttgart in the Bundesliga on 10 November 2018, coming on as a substitute in the 90+1st minute for Santiago Ascacíbar in the 2–0 away win against 1. FC Nürnberg.

On 5 July 2021, Aidonis was sent on a year long loan to Dynamo Dresden.

On 12 January 2024, Aidonis signed with Borussia Dortmund II until the end of the season.

On 15 August 2024, Aidonis joined fifth-tier Oberliga Baden-Württemberg club Sonnenhof Großaspach.

== International career ==
Aidonis was included in Germany's squad for the 2018 edition of the UEFA European Under-17 Championship in England, where the team was eliminated in the group stage.

== Personal life ==
Aidonis was born in Neustadt an der Weinstraße, Rhineland-Palatinate and is of Greek descent.

== Honours ==
Sonnenhof Großaspach

- Regionalliga Südwest: 2025–26
- Oberliga Baden-Württemberg: 2024–25
