= Claus Vogt =

German football chairman

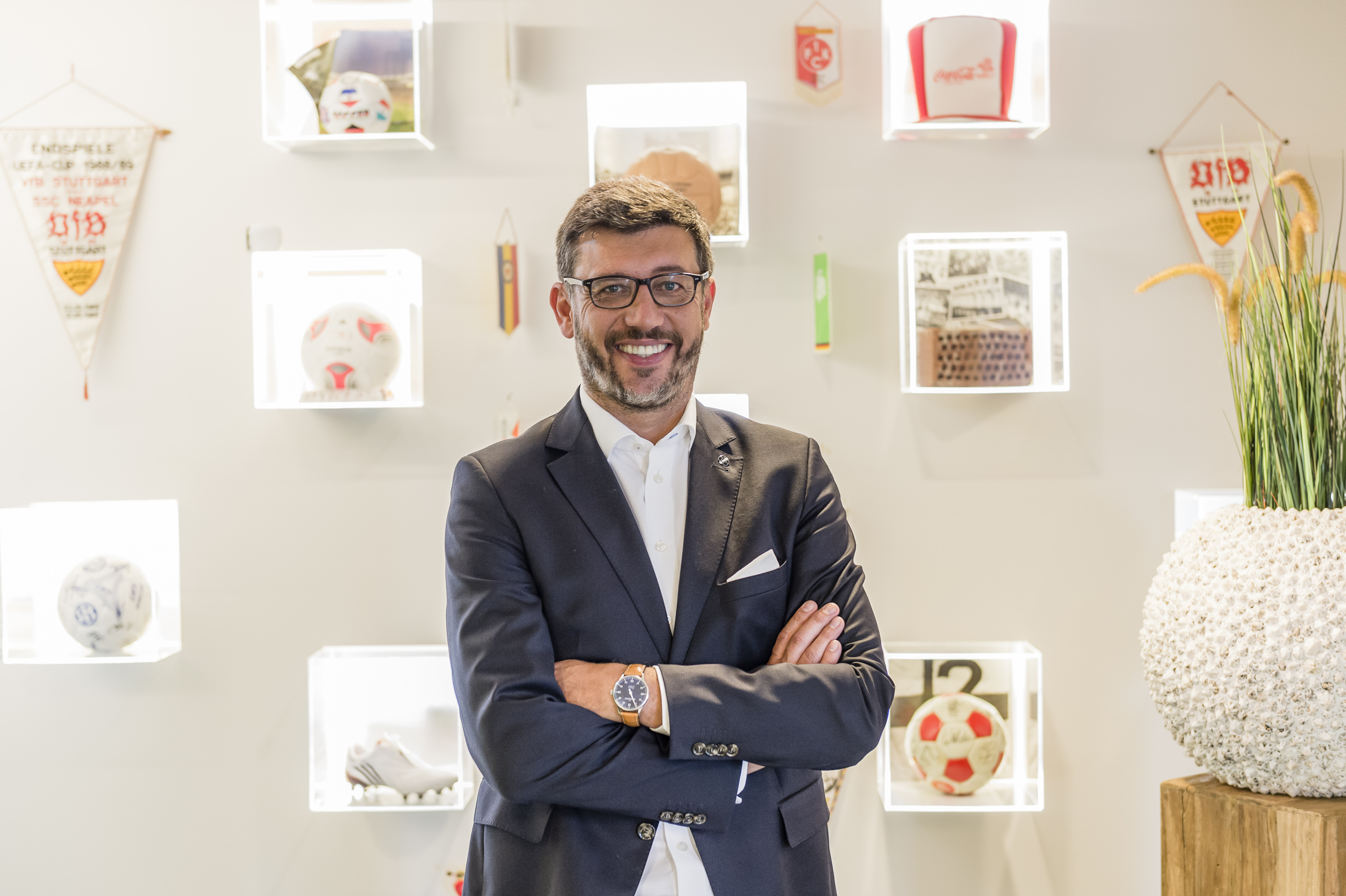
Claus Vogt

Claus Günter Vogt (born 12 August 1969 in Nürtingen) is a German football chairman. He was president of VfB Stuttgart from 15 December 2019 to 28 July 2024.

Vogt founded the facility management company Intesia Group Holding. In January 2017, he founded the club FC PlayFair!, which stands up for integrity in professional football.

On 15 December 2019, Vogt was elected as new president of VfB Stuttgart. In July 2021, Vogt was re-elected for four years. On 28 July 2024, Vogt was dismissed.
