= Roberto Massimo =

German footballer

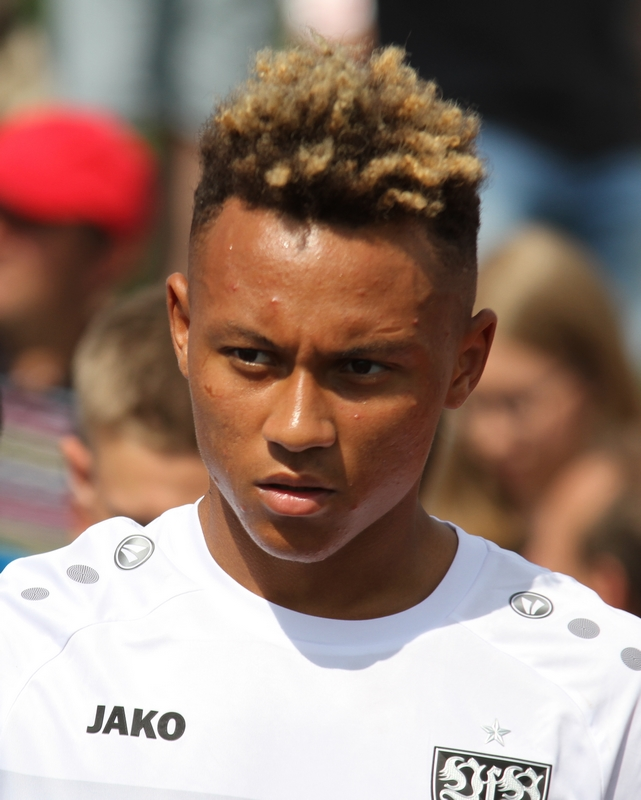
- Massimo in 2019

Personal information
- Date of birth: 12 October 2000 (age 26)
- Place of birth: Accra, Ghana
- Height: 1.83 m (6 ft 0 in)
- Positions: Winger; wing-back

Team information
- Current team: Wehen Wiesbaden (on loan from Górnik Zabrze)
- Number: 22

Youth career
- –2014: SV Lippstadt
- 2014–2017: Arminia Bielefeld

Senior career*
Years	Team	Apps	(Gls)
2017–2018	Arminia Bielefeld	7	(0)
2018–2024	VfB Stuttgart	53	(2)
2018–2019	→ Arminia Bielefeld (loan)	4	(1)
2022–2023	→ Académico Viseu (loan)	16	(4)
2024–2025	Greuther Fürth	28	(3)
2025–	Górnik Zabrze	13	(0)
2026–	→ Wehen Wiesbaden (loan)	0	(0)

International career
2018	Germany U19	2	(0)
2020–2021	Germany U21	4	(0)
- * Club domestic league appearances and goals as of 19:42, 26 August 2026 (UTC)

Roberto Massimo (born 12 October 2000) is a professional footballer who plays as a winger and wing-back for 3. Liga club Wehen Wiesbaden, on loan from Górnik Zabrze. Born a Liberian refugee in Ghana, he has represented Germany at youth level.

== Club career ==
Massimo made 18 appearances for Arminia Bielefeld's U-17 team and played seven games for the first team. In May 2018, Massimo signed a contract with Bundesliga side VfB Stuttgart, but initially remained on loan at Bielefeld until 30 June 2019.

On 22 July 2022, Massimo joined Académico Viseu in Portugal on loan for the 2022–23 season.

On 18 May 2024, VfB Stuttgart announced that Massimo would leave the club after this season when his contract expired.

On 19 July 2025, Massimo signed a three-season contract with Górnik Zabrze in Poland. On 2 May 2026, Massimo scored the opening goal in the 32nd minute of the 2025–26 Polish Cup final against Raków Częstochowa, as Górnik won 2–0 to earn their first silverware in 38 years.

On 26 August 2026, Massimo joined Wehen Wiesbaden in Germany on loan for the 2026–27 season.

== International career ==
Massimo was born in Ghana to a Liberian mother and an Italian father. He was raised in Germany and is a German and Liberian citizen. Massimo was a youth international for the Germany U19s and U21s.

== Career statistics ==
As of match played 25 July 2026

Appearances and goals by club, season and competition
Club	Season	League			National cup (Note: Includes DFB-Pokal, Polish Cup)		Other		Total	
Club	Season	Division	Apps	Goals	Apps	Goals	Apps	Goals	Apps	Goals
Arminia Bielefeld	2017–18	2. Bundesliga	7	0	0	0	—		7	0
VfB Stuttgart II	2019–20	Oberliga Baden-Württemberg	7	1	—		—		7	1
VfB Stuttgart II	2020–21	Regionalliga Südwest	1	0	—		—		1	0
VfB Stuttgart II	2021–22	Regionalliga Südwest	3	0	—		—		3	0
VfB Stuttgart II	2023–24	Regionalliga Südwest	1	0	—		—		1	0
VfB Stuttgart II	Total		12	1	—		—		12	1
VfB Stuttgart	2019–20	2. Bundesliga	11	0	1	0	—		12	0
VfB Stuttgart	2020–21	Bundesliga	18	0	2	0	—		20	0
VfB Stuttgart	2021–22	Bundesliga	19	2	1	0	—		20	2
VfB Stuttgart	2023–24	Bundesliga	5	0	1	0	—		6	0
VfB Stuttgart	Total		53	2	5	0	—		58	2
Arminia Bielefeld (loan)	2018–19	2. Bundesliga	4	1	2	0	—		6	1
Académico Viseu (loan)	2022–23	Liga Portugal 2	16	4	0	0	—		16	4
Greuther Fürth	2024–25	2. Bundesliga	28	3	2	0	—		30	3
Górnik Zabrze	2025–26	Ekstraklasa	12	0	2	1	—		14	1
Górnik Zabrze	2026–27	Ekstraklasa	1	0	—		0	0	1	0
Górnik Zabrze	Total		13	0	2	1	0	0	15	1
Wehen Wiesbaden (loan)	2026–27	3. Liga	0	0	—		—		0	0
Career total			133	10	11	1	0	0	144	11

== Honours ==
Górnik Zabrze

- Polish Cup: 2025–26
