= Pellegrino Matarazzo =

American professional soccer coach (born 1977)

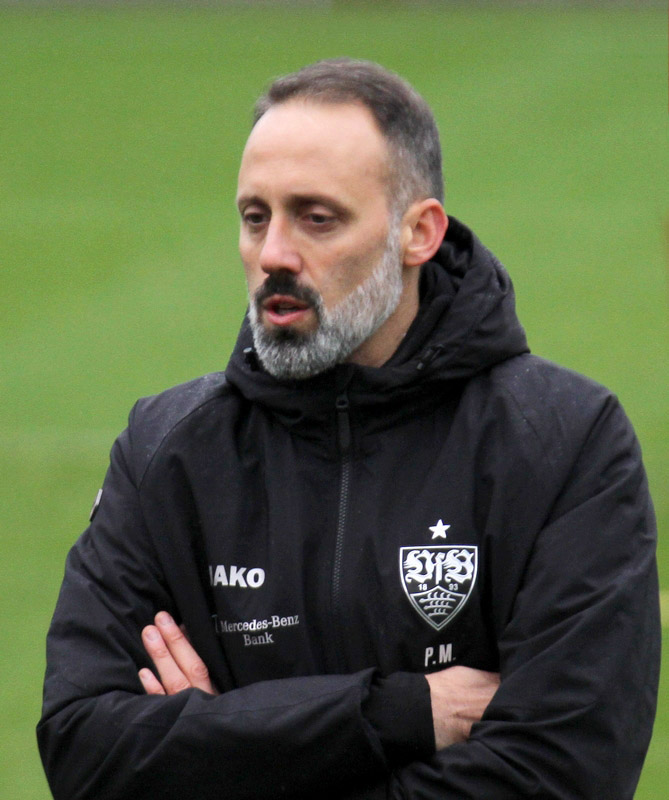
- Matarazzo with VfB Stuttgart in 2020

Personal information
- Date of birth: November 28, 1977 (age 48)
- Place of birth: Wayne, New Jersey, United States
- Height: 6 ft 6 in (1.98 m)
- Position: Defender

Team information
- Current team: Real Sociedad (head coach)

College career
Years	Team	Apps	(Gls)
1995–1999	Columbia Lions		

Senior career*
Years	Team	Apps	(Gls)
2000–2001	Eintracht Bad Kreuznach	39	(6)
2001–2003	SV Wehen	58	(0)
2003–2004	Preußen Münster	23	(0)
2004–2005	SV Wehen	18	(1)
2005–2006	SG Wattenscheid 09	31	(1)
2006–2010	1. FC Nürnberg II	62	(1)
Total		231	(9)

Managerial career
- 2011: 1. FC Nürnberg II (caretaker)
- 2019–2022: VfB Stuttgart
- 2023–2024: TSG Hoffenheim
- 2025–: Real Sociedad
- * Club domestic league appearances and goals

Pellegrino Matarazzo (born November 28, 1977) is an American professional soccer coach and former soccer player. He is the current head coach of La Liga club Real Sociedad.

He previously served as coach of German soccer clubs VfB Stuttgart and TSG Hoffenheim.

== Early life ==
Matarazzo was raised in Fair Lawn, New Jersey, to Italian immigrants. He has three younger brothers: Leo, Frank, and Antonio, all of them were in a Napoli fanclub at the time Diego Maradona played there. Leo and Antonio also played at Columbia. He played several sports growing up, including basketball and volleyball due to his height, but saw the most success in soccer, being a four-year varsity starter for Fair Lawn High School, leading the Cutters to the state tournament as a senior for the first time in nearly 20 years, before graduating in 1995. Matarazzo was later inducted into the Fair Lawn High School Athletics Hall of Fame in the Class of 2016. He went on to play at Columbia University, where he earned a degree in applied mathematics in 1999.

== Playing career ==
After his graduation from Columbia, Matarazzo decided to go for a career as a professional soccer player. After failed trials at Serie B club Salernitana based in his mother's hometown, Salerno, and Serie C club Juve Stabia in Italy, he signed in Germany's fourth division with Eintracht Bad Kreuznach. Between 2001 and 2005, Matarazzo played for SV Wehen with a year at Preußen Münster for the 2003–04 season, as well as SG Wattenscheid 09 and 1. FC Nürnberg's reserve team. Later, Matarazzo served as assistant coach while playing for Nürnberg II at the same time.

== Coaching career ==
=== Early career ===
Matarazzo worked many years at Nürnberg's academy, coaching the B and A juniors. In 2015, Matarazzo started the German coaching training at the Hennes-Weisweiler-Akademie, where he shared a room with Julian Nagelsmann. Later, Matarazzo joined Nagelsmann's coaching staff at Hoffenheim in 2017, becoming youth coach there. In 2018, Matarazzo became Nagelsmann's assistant and interfaced between the first team and academy, and stayed there with Alfred Schreuder as head coach. In December 2019, Sven Mislintat signed Matarazzo as first team coach of VfB Stuttgart. He was sacked in October 2022.

=== TSG Hoffenheim ===
On February 8, 2023, Matarazzo returned to TSG Hoffenheim, this time as head coach of the first team. He signed a contract until June 2025, replacing André Breitenreiter. In November 2024, he was sacked.

=== Real Sociedad ===
On December 20, 2025, Matarazzo was appointed as head coach of La Liga club Real Sociedad, signing a contract until June 2027. On April 18, 2026, he secured the Copa del Rey title following a penalty shootout victory over Atlético Madrid in the final, becoming the first American coach to win a major trophy in one of Europe's top five leagues. On 7 July 2026, he signed a new two-year contract with the club until 2028.

== Coaching statistics ==
As of matches played 22 November 2026

Managerial record by team and tenure
Team	From	To	Record								Ref
Team	From	To	G	W	D	L	GF	GA	GD	Win %	Ref
1. FC Nürnberg II (caretaker)	12 April 2011	30 June 2011	7	2	3	2	17	14	+3	28.57	
VfB Stuttgart	30 December 2019	10 October 2022	100	31	29	40	149	151	−2	31.00	
TSG Hoffenheim	8 February 2023	11 November 2024	67	23	15	29	112	116	−4	34.33	
Real Sociedad	20 December 2025	Present	43	18	13	12	79	69	+10	41.86	
Total			217	74	60	83	357	350	+7	34.10	—

== Honors ==
=== Coach ===
Real Sociedad

- Copa del Rey: 2025–26

Individual

- La Liga Manager of the Month: January 2026
