= Borna Sosa =

Croatian footballer (born 1998)

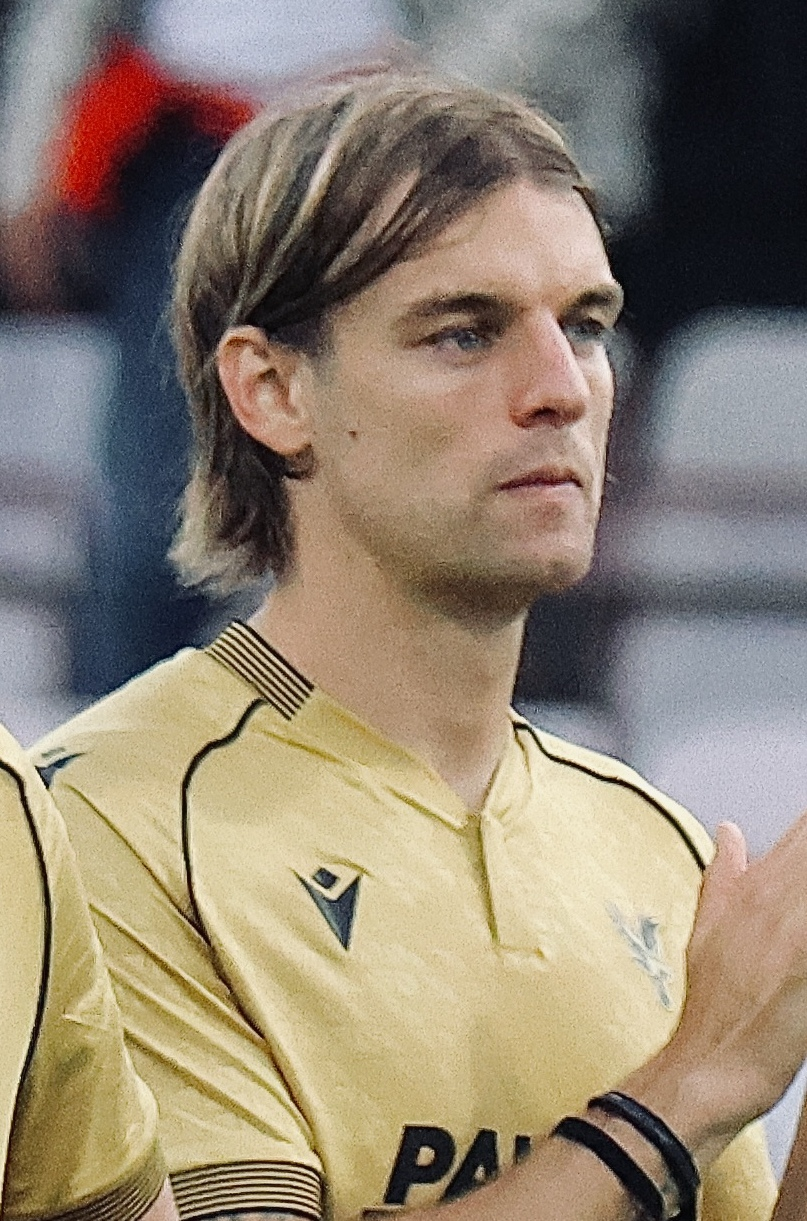
- Sosa in 2025

Personal information
- Full name: Borna Sosa
- Date of birth: 21 January 1998 (age 28)
- Place of birth: Zagreb, Croatia
- Height: 1.87 m (6 ft 2 in)
- Positions: Left-back; wing-back

Team information
- Current team: 1. FC Köln; (on loan from Crystal Palace)
- Number: 3

Youth career
- 2005–2015: Dinamo Zagreb

Senior career*
Years	Team	Apps	(Gls)
2015–2018	Dinamo Zagreb	32	(0)
2015–2017	→ Dinamo Zagreb II	11	(0)
2018–2023	VfB Stuttgart	105	(4)
2023–2025	Ajax	16	(0)
2024–2025	→ Torino (loan)	19	(0)
2025–	Crystal Palace	7	(0)
2026–	→ 1. FC Köln (loan)	5	(0)

International career^{‡}
2012	Croatia U14	2	(0)
2013	Croatia U15	2	(0)
2013–2014	Croatia U16	3	(0)
2013–2015	Croatia U17	21	(1)
2015	Croatia U18	2	(0)
2016–2017	Croatia U19	7	(0)
2017–2020	Croatia U21	19	(0)
2021–	Croatia	26	(2)
Medal record
Men's football
Representing Croatia
FIFA World Cup
Third place	2022 Qatar
UEFA Nations League
Runner-up	2023 Netherlands
- * Club domestic league appearances and goals as of 17:30, 1 November 2026 (UTC) ‡ National team caps and goals as of 23:14, 18 November 2024 (UTC)

Borna Sosa (Croatian pronunciation: [bôːrna sǒːsa]; born 21 January 1998) is a Croatian professional footballer who plays as a left-back or wing-back for Bundesliga club 1. FC Köln, on loan from Premier League club Crystal Palace, and the Croatia national team.

== Club career ==
=== Dinamo Zagreb ===
Sosa was born in the Prečko neighbourhood of Zagreb to Herzegovinian Croat parents from Gradac, near Posušje. He was a youth player for Dinamo Zagreb. He was given his Prva HNL debut for Dinamo by coach Zoran Mamić on 7 March 2015 in a 2–0 home win over Zagreb, starting and playing the full 90 minutes. On 10 May 2016, he played full 90 minutes in the Croatian Cup Final as Dinamo defeated Slaven Belupo 2–1. He made his European debut on 12 July 2016, when coach Zlatko Kranjčar substituted him for Alexandru Mățel in the 66th minute of the 2–1 victory over Vardar in Skopje in the Champions League second qualifying round. Over the course of four seasons at Dinamo, Sosa made 41 appearances and six assists for his hometown club.

=== VfB Stuttgart ===
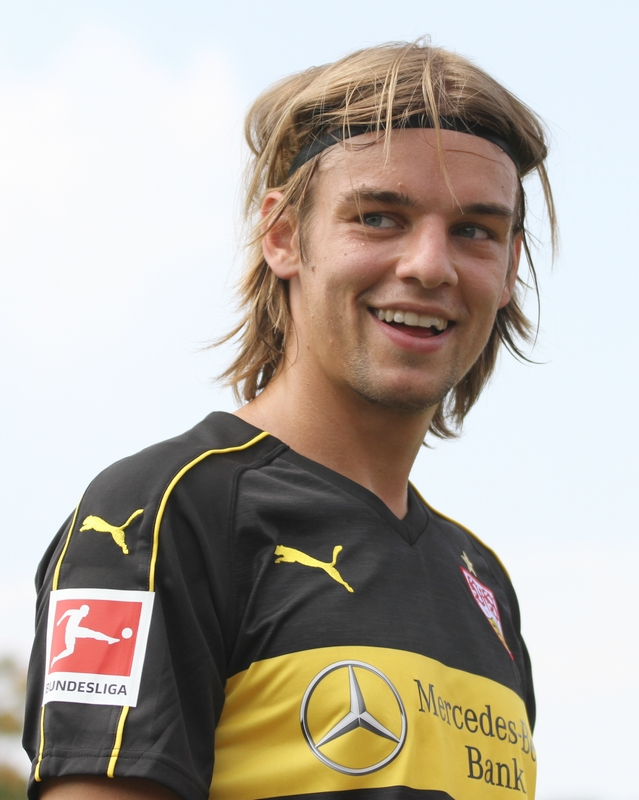
Sosa with VfB Stuttgart in 2018

On 14 May 2018, Sosa signed a five-year-contract with VfB Stuttgart, with effect from 1 July. He made his debut for Stuttgart on 26 August, after being substituted on for Emiliano Insúa in the 84th minute of the 1–0 loss to Mainz. However, due to frequent injuries, Sosa's minutes were significantly reduced in his first season with Stuttgart, which saw the club relegated to the 2. Bundesliga. The injuries continued during his second season as well, resulting in Sosa making only 24 appearances for Stuttgart in his first two seasons. On 16 December 2019, he scored his debut goal for Stuttgart in a 1–1 draw with Darmstadt. However, the 2020–21 season was Sosa's breakthrough season, as he found form and consistency in Pellegrino Matarazzo's 3–4–2–1 formation. His performances in the Bundesliga earned him praise and comparisons to David Beckham, whom he named his football role model alongside David Alaba. On 27 November 2020, he extended his contract until 2025. He finished the season with nine assists on his account.

At the beginning of the 2021–22 season, on 7 August, Sosa captained Stuttgart for the first time in a DFB-Pokal match against Dynamo Berlin, scoring and assisting in the 6–0 victory. Seven days later, on the first matchday of Bundesliga, Sosa provided Marc-Oliver Kempf and Hamadi Al Ghaddioui with a hat-trick of assists as Stuttgart defeated Greuther Fürth 5–1.

=== Ajax ===
On 1 September 2023, Sosa moved to Eredivisie club Ajax, signing a contract until 30 June 2028. He featured regularly at left-back during the 2023–24 season, under managers Maurice Steijn and John van 't Schip, making 25 appearances across the Eredivisie, UEFA Europa League, and UEFA Europa Conference League.

==== Loan to Torino ====
On 17 August 2024, after just one season in Amsterdam, Sosa moved to Italy, joining Serie A club Torino on a season-long loan with an option to buy. He quickly established himself as a regular starter for Torino during the 2024–25 season, often playing as a left wing-back. Sosa made a total of twenty appearances for Torino. Sosa provided zero assists and did not score any goals. At the end of the season, Torino decided not to exercise the option to buy the on-loan left-back.

=== Crystal Palace ===
On 11 July 2025, Premier League club Crystal Palace announced the signing of Sosa on a three-year deal. On 10 August, he made his debut for the club as a second-half substitute against Liverpool in the FA Community Shield, which finished as a 2–2 draw; though Sosa missed his penalty in the ensuing shootout, he won his first trophy with Palace after they triumphed 3–2. On 2 October, he was sent off for a second yellow card in Palace's 2–0 away win over Dynamo Kyiv in the UEFA Conference League.

==== Loan to 1. FC Köln ====
On 1 September 2026, Sosa joined Bundesliga club 1. FC Köln on loan.

== International career ==
Sosa represented Croatia at the 2015 UEFA Under-17 Euro and the 2015 FIFA U-17 World Cup. In May 2018, he was named in Zlatko Dalić's preliminary 32-man squad for the 2018 World Cup in Russia, but did not make the final 23. He was named in Nenad Gračan's squad for the UEFA Under-21 Euro 2019 and Igor Bišćan's squad for the UEFA Under-21 Euro 2021. However, he was ruled out of the latter squad at the last minute due to a knee injury.

On 7 May 2021, it was reported by Sportske novosti and Sky Sport that Sosa was given German citizenship, on Germany coach Joachim Löw's initiative, through his mother Vesna who was born and raised in Berlin, and was expected to represent Germany at the UEFA Euro 2020. A day later, on 8 May, Sosa himself confirmed the information to 24sata. However, on 11 May, Oliver Bierhoff, the technical director of the German Football Association, announced that Sosa is ineligible to play for Germany according to the FIFA rules. Two days later, on 13 May, Sosa issued an official apology to the Croatian public, Croatia national team fans and the Croatian Football Federation via the Federation's website.

Sosa earned his first call-up to the national team on 16 August 2021, ahead of the September World Cup qualifiers against Russia, Slovakia and Slovenia. He made his debut on 1 September in a goalless draw against Russia, being named in the starting lineup. On 14 November, in the crucial qualifier against the same opponent, Sosa caused Fyodor Kudryashov's own goal, leading to Croatia's 1–0 victory and qualification for the World Cup. On 22 September 2022, he scored his debut goal for the national team in a 2–1 Nations League victory over Denmark.

== Career statistics ==
=== Club ===
As of match played 1 November 2026

Appearances and goals by club, season and competition
Club	Season	League			National cup (Note: Includes Croatian Football Cup, DFB-Pokal, Coppa Italia, FA Cup)		League cup (Note: Includes EFL Cup)		Europe		Other		Total	
Club	Season	Division	Apps	Goals	Apps	Goals	Apps	Goals	Apps	Goals	Apps	Goals	Apps	Goals
Dinamo Zagreb	2014–15	Prva HNL	1	0	0	0	—		0	0	—		1	0
Dinamo Zagreb	2015–16	Prva HNL	2	0	1	0	—		0	0	—		3	0
Dinamo Zagreb	2016–17	Prva HNL	8	0	3	0	—		3 (Note: Appearances in UEFA Champions League)	0	—		14	0
Dinamo Zagreb	2017–18	Prva HNL	21	0	2	0	—		0	0	—		23	0
Dinamo Zagreb	Total		32	0	6	0	—		3	0	—		41	0
Dinamo Zagreb II	2015–16	Druga HNL	6	0	—		—		—		—		6	0
Dinamo Zagreb II	2016–17	Druga HNL	5	0	—		—		—		—		5	0
Dinamo Zagreb II	Total		11	0	—		—		—		—		11	0
VfB Stuttgart	2018–19	Bundesliga	12	0	0	0	—		—		0	0	12	0
VfB Stuttgart	2019–20	2. Bundesliga	12	1	1	0	—		—		—		13	1
VfB Stuttgart	2020–21	Bundesliga	26	0	2	0	—		—		—		28	0
VfB Stuttgart	2021–22	Bundesliga	28	1	2	1	—		—		—		30	2
VfB Stuttgart	2022–23	Bundesliga	25	2	3	0	—		—		2 (Note: Appearances in Bundesliga relegation play-offs)	0	30	2
VfB Stuttgart	2023–24	Bundesliga	2	0	—		—		—		—		2	0
VfB Stuttgart	Total		105	4	8	1	—		—		2	0	115	5
Ajax	2023–24	Eredivisie	16	0	0	0	—		9 (Note: Five appearances in UEFA Europa League, four appearances in UEFA Europa Conference League)	0	—		25	0
Torino (loan)	2024–25	Serie A	19	0	1	0	—		—		—		20	0
Crystal Palace	2025–26	Premier League	7	0	1	0	3	0	6 (Note: Appearances in UEFA Conference League)	0	1 (Note: Appearance in FA Community Shield)	0	18	0
1. FC Köln	2026–27	Bundesliga	5	0	1	0	—		—		—		6	0
Career total			195	4	17	1	3	0	18	0	3	0	236	5

=== International ===
As of match played 18 November 2024

Appearances and goals by national team and year
National team	Year	Apps	Goals
Croatia	2021	5	0
Croatia	2022	8	1
Croatia	2023	5	0
Croatia	2024	8	1
Total		26	2

Scores and results list Croatia's goal tally first, score column indicates score after each Sosa goal.

List of international goals scored by Borna Sosa
No.	Date	Venue	Cap	Opponent	Score	Result	Competition
1	22 September 2022	Stadion Maksimir, Zagreb, Croatia	7	Denmark	1–0	2–1	2022–23 UEFA Nations League A
2	15 October 2024	National Stadium, Warsaw, Poland	25	Poland	1–1	3–3	2024–25 UEFA Nations League A

== Honours ==
Dinamo Zagreb

- Prva HNL: 2015–16, 2017–18
- Croatian Cup: 2015–16, 2017–18

Crystal Palace

- UEFA Conference League: 2025–26
- FA Community Shield: 2025

Croatia

- FIFA World Cup third place: 2022
- UEFA Nations League runner-up: 2022–23

Individual

- UEFA European U17 Championship Team of the Tournament: 2015
