= 2019–20 VfB Stuttgart season =

VfB Stuttgart
2019–20 season
- President: Claus Vogt
- Manager: Tim Walter (until 23 December 2019); Pellegrino Matarazzo (from 30 December 2019)
- Stadium: Mercedes-Benz Arena
- 2. Bundesliga: 2nd (promoted)
- DFB-Pokal: Round of 16
- Top goalscorer: League: Nicolás González (14); All: Nicolás González (15)
Home colours	Away colours	Third colours

The 2019–20 VfB Stuttgart season was the 127th season in the football club's history and their third overall season in the second division of German football, the 2. Bundesliga, having been relegated from the Bundesliga in the previous season. In addition to the 2. Bundesliga, VfB Stuttgart also participated in the DFB-Pokal. This was the 87th season for Stuttgart in the Mercedes-Benz Arena, located in Stuttgart, Baden-Württemberg, Germany.

== Season summary ==
In May 2019, Stuttgart appointed Tim Walter as their new head coach. Despite a strong start to the season, with Stuttgart third at Christmas, Walter was sacked on 23 December 2019, with Stuttgart appointing Pellegrino Matarazzo as his replacement on 30 December 2019. However, in March 2020, the season was postponed due to the coronavirus pandemic, putting Stuttgart's promotion hopes in doubt.

== Transfers ==
=== Transfers in ===
Date	Position	Nationality	Name	From	Fee	Ref.
1 July 2019	AM	(Argentina)	Mateo Klimowicz	(Argentina) Instituto de Córdoba	Undisclosed	
1 July 2019	DM	(Germany)	Atakan Karazor	(Germany) Holstein Kiel	€800,000	
1 July 2019	CM	(Germany)	Philipp Klement	(Germany) SC Paderborn 07	Undisclosed	
1 July 2019	GK	(Germany)	Fabian Bredlow	(Germany) 1. FC Nürnberg	Undisclosed	
1 July 2019	CF	(Morocco)	Hamadi Al Ghaddioui	Jahn Regensburg	€300,000	
2 July 2019	LW	(France)	Tanguy Coulibaly	(France) Paris Saint-Germain	Free	
5 July 2019	CF	(Austria)	Saša Kalajdžić	(Austria) Admira Wacker	Undisclosed	
5 July 2019	CB	(Germany)	Maxime Awoudja	(Germany) Bayern Munich	Undisclosed	
13 August 2019	CF	(Democratic Republic of the Congo)	Silas	(France) Paris	Undisclosed	
29 August 2019	DM	(Denmark)	Nikolas Nartey	(Germany) 1. FC Köln	Undisclosed	
2 September 2019	AM	(Germany)	Philipp Förster	(Germany) SV Sandhausen	Undisclosed	
13 January 2020	LW	(North Macedonia)	Darko Churlinov	(Germany) 1. FC Köln	Undisclosed	
31 January 2020	DM	(England)	Clinton Mola	(England) Chelsea	Undisclosed	

=== Loans in ===
Date from	Position	Nationality	Name	From	Date until	Ref.
7 June 2020	RB	(Germany)	Pascal Stenzel	(Germany) SC Freiburg	30 June 2020	
24 June 2019	GK	(Switzerland)	Gregor Kobel	(Germany) FC Augsburg	30 June 2020	
7 August 2019	CB	(England)	Nathaniel Phillips	(England) Liverpool	1 January 2020	
13 August 2019	DM	(Japan)	Wataru Endo	(Belgium) Sint-Truiden	30 June 2020	
13 January 2020	CB	(England)	Nathaniel Phillips	(England) Liverpool	30 June 2020	

=== Transfers out ===
Date	Position	Nationality	Name	To	Fee	Ref.
1 July 2019	CB	(France)	Benjamin Pavard	(Germany) Bayern Munich	Undisclosed	
1 July 2019	GK	(Germany)	Ron-Robert Zieler	(Germany) Hannover 96	Undisclosed	
1 July 2019	GK	(Germany)	Alexander Meyer	(Germany) Jahn Regensburg	Free	
1 July 2019	CB	(Turkey)	Ozan Kabak	(Germany) FC Schalke 04	Undisclosed	
5 July 2019	CM	(Germany)	Christian Gentner	(Germany) 1. FC Union Berlin	Free	
16 July 2019	RW	(Germany)	Leon Dajaku	(Germany) Bayern Munich	Undisclosed	
25 July 2019	CB	(Germany)	Timo Baumgartl	(Netherlands) PSV Eindhoven	Undisclosed	
1 January 2020	DM	(Argentina)	Santiago Ascacíbar	(Germany) Hertha BSC	Undisclosed	
2 January 2020	LB	(Argentina)	Emiliano Insúa	(United States) LA Galaxy	Undisclosed	

=== Loans out ===
Date from	Position	Nationality	Name	To	Date until	Ref.
1 July 2019	RB	(Spain)	Pablo Maffeo	(Spain) Girona	30 June 2020	
10 July 2019	LM	(Germany)	Erik Thommy	(Germany) Fortuna Düsseldorf	30 June 2020 (Note: Fortuna Düsseldorf have the option to sign Thommy permanently following his loan spell)	
16 July 2019	AM	(Germany)	David Kopacz	(Poland) Górnik Zabrze	30 June 2020	
30 July 2019	RW	(Democratic Republic of the Congo)	Chadrac Akolo	(France) Amiens SC	30 June 2020 (Note: Amiens will sign Akolo permanently following his loan spell)	
30 August 2019	DM	(Denmark)	Nikolas Nartey	(Germany) Hansa Rostock	30 June 2020	
2 September 2019	CF	(Greece)	Anastasios Donis	(France) Stade de Reims	30 June 2020 (Note: Donis will move permanently to Reims if the club avoids relegation for €8 million)	

== Competitions ==
=== 2. Bundesliga ===
==== League table ====
Pos	Team	Pld	W	D	L	GF	GA	GD	Pts	Promotion, qualification or relegation
1	Arminia Bielefeld (C, P)	34	18	14	2	65	30	+35	68	Promotion to Bundesliga
2	VfB Stuttgart (P)	34	17	7	10	62	41	+21	58	Promotion to Bundesliga
3	1. FC Heidenheim	34	15	10	9	45	36	+9	55	Qualification for promotion play-offs
4	Hamburger SV	34	14	12	8	62	46	+16	54	
5	Darmstadt 98	34	13	13	8	48	43	+5	52	

Source: DFB
Rules for classification: 1) Points; 2) Goal difference; 3) Goals scored; 4) Head-to-head points; 5) Head-to-head goal difference; 6) Head-to-head away goals scored; 7) Away goals scored; 8) Play-off.
(C) Champions; (P) Promoted

==== Results summary ====
Overall								Home						Away					
Pld	W	D	L	GF	GA	GD	Pts	W	D	L	GF	GA	GD	W	D	L	GF	GA	GD
34	17	7	10	62	41	+21	58	12	2	3	36	15	+21	5	5	7	26	26	0

Last updated: 25 May 2020.

==== Results by matchday ====
Matchday	1	2	3	4	5	6	7	8	9	10	11	12	13	14	15	16	17	18	19	20	21	22	23	24	25	26	27	28	29	30	31	32	33	34
Ground	H	A	H	A	H	A	H	A	H	H	A	H	A	H	A	H	A	A	H	A	H	A	H	A	H	A	A	H	A	H	A	H	A	H
Result	W	D	W	D	W	W	W	W	L	L	L	W	L	W	L	W	D	D	W	D	W	W	W	L	D	L	L	W	W	D	L	W	W	L
Position	4	7	2	3	2	1	1	1	2	2	3	3	3	3	3	3	3	3	3	3	3	3	2	2	2	3	3	2	2	2	3	2	2	2

Updated to match(es) played on 25 May 2020. Source: Kicker.de
A = Away; H = Home; W = Win; D = Draw; L = Loss

==== Matches ====
26 July 2019 1	VfB Stuttgart	2–1	Hannover 96	Stuttgart
20:30 CEST	Gómez 29'; Didavi 36'	Report	Awoudja 39' (o.g.)	Stadium: Mercedes-Benz Arena; Attendance: 52,021; Referee: Felix Brych

4 August 2019 2	1. FC Heidenheim	2–2	VfB Stuttgart	Heidenheim an der Brenz
13:30 CEST	Leipertz 78'; Kempf 84' (o.g.)	Report	Al Ghaddioui 52'; Badstuber 57'	Stadium: Voith-Arena; Attendance: 15,000; Referee: Benjamin Cortus

17 August 2019 3	VfB Stuttgart	2–1	FC St. Pauli	Stuttgart
13:00 CEST	Kempf 60'; González 90'	Report	Møller Dæhli 18'	Stadium: Mercedes-Benz Arena; Attendance: 53,315; Referee: Guido Winkmann

23 August 2019 4	Erzgebirge Aue	0–0	VfB Stuttgart	Aue
18:30 CEST		Report		Stadium: Erzgebirgsstadion; Attendance: 13,950; Referee: Felix Zwayer

2 September 2019 5	VfB Stuttgart	2–1	VfL Bochum	Stuttgart
20:30 CEST	Didavi 19'; González 48'	Report	Ganvoula 40'	Stadium: Mercedes-Benz Arena; Attendance: 48,624; Referee: Manuel Gräfe

14 September 2019 6	Jahn Regensburg	2–3	VfB Stuttgart	Regensburg
13:00 CEST	Besuschkow 71' (pen.); Palacios 90+3'	Report	González 24'; Badstuber 76'; Al Ghaddioui 90+2'	Stadium: Arena Regensburg; Attendance: 15,210; Referee: Tobias Stieler

21 September 2019 7	VfB Stuttgart	2–0	Greuther Fürth	Stuttgart
13:00 CEST	Divadi 2'; Förster 82'	Report		Stadium: Mercedes-Benz Arena; Attendance: 50,543; Referee: Sören Storks

27 September 2019 8	Arminia Bielefeld	0–1	VfB Stuttgart	Bielefeld
18:30 CEST		Report	Al Ghaddioui 90+1'	Stadium: Bielefelder Alm; Attendance: 26,124; Referee: Timo Gerach

4 October 2019 9	VfB Stuttgart	1–2	Wehen Wiesbaden	Stuttgart
18:30 CEST	Al Ghaddioui 11'	Report	Schäffler 3', 18'	Stadium: Mercedes-Benz Arena; Attendance: 49,627; Referee: Johann Pfeifer

20 October 2019 10	VfB Stuttgart	0–1	Holstein Kiel	Stuttgart
13:30 CEST		Report	Lee 55'	Stadium: Mercedes-Benz Arena; Attendance: 54,176; Referee: Benedikt Kempkes

26 October 2019 11	Hamburger SV	6–2	VfB Stuttgart	Hamburg
13:00 CEST	Kittel 13' (pen.), 36'; Jatta 24'; Castro 56' (o.g.); Harnik 76'; Fein 90+1'	Report	González 33'; Silas 63'	Stadium: Volksparkstadion; Attendance: 57,000; Referee: Deniz Aytekin

3 November 2019 12	VfB Stuttgart	3–1	Dynamo Dresden	Stuttgart
13:30 CET	Hämäläinen 3' (o.g.); Ascacíbar 38'; Silas 84'	Report	Koné 51' (pen.)	Stadium: Mercedes-Benz Arena; Attendance: 52,129; Referee: Arne Aarnink

9 November 2019 13	VfL Osnabrück	1–0	VfB Stuttgart	Osnabrück
13:00 CET	Álvarez 4'	Report		Stadium: Stadion an der Bremer Brücke; Attendance: 15,801; Referee: Nicolas Winter

24 November 2019 14	VfB Stuttgart	3–0	Karlsruher SC	Stuttgart
13:30 CET	Förster 60'; Mangala 75'; Al Ghaddioui 90+3'	Report		Stadium: Mercedes-Benz Arena; Attendance: 57,483; Referee: Tobias Stieler

1 December 2019 15	SV Sandhausen	2–1	VfB Stuttgart	Sandhausen
13:30 CET	Bouhaddouz 1', 24'	Report	Silas 89' (pen.)	Stadium: BWT-Stadion am Hardtwald; Attendance: 13,689; Referee: Harm Osmers

9 December 2019 16	VfB Stuttgart	3–1	1. FC Nürnberg	Stuttgart
20:30 CET	Silas 58' (pen.); Gómez 59'; Förster 72'	Report	Frey 10'	Stadium: Mercedes-Benz Arena; Attendance: 48,971; Referee: Robert Schröder

16 December 2019 17	SV Darmstadt 98	1–1	VfB Stuttgart	Darmstadt
20:30 CET	Kempe 20'	Report	Sosa 45'	Stadium: Merck-Stadion am Böllenfalltor; Attendance: 14,875; Referee: Patrick Ittrich

21 December 2019 18	Hannover 96	2–2	VfB Stuttgart	Hanover
13:00 CET	Ducksch 13'; Prib 74'	Report	González 46'; Silas 62'	Stadium: Niedersachsenstadion; Attendance: 35,200; Referee: Thorben Siewer

29 January 2020 19	VfB Stuttgart	3–0	1. FC Heidenheim	Stuttgart
18:30 CET	Kempf 32'; González 76'; Gómez 86'	Report		Stadium: Mercedes-Benz Arena; Attendance: 52,585; Referee: Florian Badstübner

1 February 2020 20	FC St. Pauli	1–1	VfB Stuttgart	Hamburg
13:00 CET	Veerman 56'	Report	Gómez 81'	Stadium: Millerntor-Stadion; Attendance: 29,546; Referee: Felix Brych

8 February 2020 21	VfB Stuttgart	3–0	Erzgebirge Aue	Stuttgart
13:00 CET	Didavi 34', 42'; Gómez 90+1'	Report		Stadium: Mercedes-Benz Arena; Attendance: 50,846; Referee: René Rohde

17 February 2020 22	VfL Bochum	0–1	VfB Stuttgart	Bochum
20:30 CET		Report	Al Ghaddioui 80'	Stadium: Ruhrstadion; Attendance: 18,090; Referee: Frank Willenborg

22 February 2020 23	VfB Stuttgart	2–0	Jahn Regensburg	Stuttgart
13:00 CET	Didavi 58'; Castro 59'	Report		Stadium: Mercedes-Benz Arena; Attendance: 46,924; Referee: Harm Osmers

29 February 2020 24	Greuther Fürth	2–0	VfB Stuttgart	Fürth
13:00 CET	Caligiuri 48'; Ernst 76'	Report		Stadium: Sportpark Ronhof Thomas Sommer; Attendance: 13,490; Referee: Thorben Siewer

9 March 2020 25	VfB Stuttgart	1–1	Arminia Bielefeld	Stuttgart
20:30 CET	Gómez 53'	Report	Soukou 74'	Stadium: Mercedes-Benz Arena; Attendance: 54,302; Referee: Bastian Dankert

17 May 2020 26	Wehen Wiesbaden	2–1	VfB Stuttgart	Wiesbaden
13:30 CEST	Schäffler 50'; Tietz 90+7' (pen.)	Report	González 83'	Stadium: Brita-Arena; Attendance: 0 (Note: Match played behind closed doors); Referee: Sascha Stegemann

24 May 2020 27	Holstein Kiel	3–2	VfB Stuttgart	Kiel
13:30 CEST	Iyoha 5'; Dehm 78'; Lauberbach 79'	Report	González 59' (pen.); Silas 86'	Stadium: Holstein-Stadion; Attendance: 0 Referee: Robert Schröder

28 May 2020 28	VfB Stuttgart	3–2	Hamburger SV	Stuttgart
20:30 CEST	Endo 47'; González 60' (pen.); Castro 90+2'	Report	Pohjanpalo 16'; Hunt 45+2' (pen.)	Stadium: Mercedes-Benz Arena; Attendance: 0 Referee: Christian Dingert

31 May 2020 29	Dynamo Dresden	0–2	VfB Stuttgart	Dresden
13:30 CEST		Report	Al Ghaddioui 18'; Churlinov 88'	Stadium: Rudolf-Harbig-Stadion; Attendance: 0 Referee: Benjamin Cortus

7 June 2020 30	VfB Stuttgart	0–0	VfL Osnabrück	Stuttgart
13:30 CEST		Report		Stadium: Mercedes-Benz Arena; Attendance: 0 Referee: Tobias Welz

14 June 2020 31	Karlsruher SC	2–1	VfB Stuttgart	Karlsruhe
13:30 CEST	Wanitzek 7'; Fröde 72'	Report	González 35' (pen.)	Stadium: Wildparkstadion; Attendance: 0 Referee: Timo Gerach

17 June 2020 32	VfB Stuttgart	5–1	SV Sandhausen	Stuttgart
18:45 CEST	González 12', 32' (pen.); Castro 20'; Kister 28' (o.g.); Al Ghaddioui 90+4'	Report	Peña Zauner 68'	Stadium: Mercedes-Benz Arena; Attendance: 0 Referee: Patrick Alt

21 June 2020 33	1. FC Nürnberg	0–6	VfB Stuttgart	Nürnberg
15:30 CEST		Report	Silas 11'; Karazor 26', 63'; Kalajdzic 41'; González 52', 76'	Stadium: Max-Morlock-Stadion; Attendance: 0 Referee: Matthias Jöllenbeck

28 June 2020 34	VfB Stuttgart	1–3	SV Darmstadt 98	Stuttgart
15:30 CEST	Gómez 42'	Report	Dursun 32'; Bader 53'; Kempe 88'	Stadium: Mercedes-Benz Arena; Attendance: 0 Referee: Bibiana Steinhaus

=== DFB-Pokal ===
12 August 2019 First round	Hansa Rostock	0–1	VfB Stuttgart	Rostock
18:30 CEST		Report	Al Ghaddioui 19'	Stadium: Ostseestadion; Attendance: 24,000; Referee: Sven Jablonski

29 October 2019 Second round	Hamburger SV	1–2 (a.e.t.)	VfB Stuttgart	Hamburg
18:30 CET	Hunt 16' (pen.)	Report	González 2' (pen.); Al Ghaddioui 113'	Stadium: Volksparkstadion; Attendance: 45,503; Referee: Bastian Dankert

5 February 2020 Round of 16	Bayer Leverkusen	2–1	VfB Stuttgart	Leverkusen
18:30 CET	Bredlow 72' (o.g.); Alario 83'	Report	Silas 85'	Stadium: BayArena; Attendance: 20,000; Referee: Bibiana Steinhaus

== Player statistics ==
=== Appearances and goals ===
No.	Pos	Nat	Player	Total		2. Bundesliga		DFB-Pokal	
No.	Pos	Nat	Player	Apps	Goals	Apps	Goals	Apps	Goals
Goalkeepers
1	GK	(Switzerland) SUI	Gregor Kobel	31	0	31	0	0	0
13	GK	(Germany) GER	Jens Grahl	0	0	0	0	0	0
33	GK	(Germany) GER	Fabian Bredlow	7	0	3+1	0	3	0
Defenders
4	DF	(Germany) GER	Marc-Oliver Kempf	23	2	19+2	2	2	0
5	DF	(England) ENG	Nathaniel Phillips	11	0	7+2	0	0+2	0
15	DF	(Germany) GER	Pascal Stenzel	37	0	31+3	0	3	0
17	DF	(Germany) GER	Maxime Awoudja	2	0	1+1	0	0	0
24	DF	(Croatia) CRO	Borna Sosa	13	1	8+4	1	1	0
26	DF	(Germany) GER	Antonis Aidonis	0	0	0	0	0	0
28	DF	(Germany) GER	Holger Badstuber	21	2	19	2	2	0
35	DF	(Poland) POL	Marcin Kamiński	9	0	8+1	0	0	0
36	DF	(Germany) GER	Luca Mack	1	0	0+1	0	0	0
38	DF	(Germany) GER	David Grözinger	0	0	0	0	0	0
Midfielders
3	MF	(Japan) JPN	Wataru Endo	22	1	20+1	1	1	0
6	MF	(England) ENG	Clinton Mola	9	1	5+3	1	0+1	0
8	MF	(Germany) GER	Gonzalo Castro	31	3	24+4	3	3	0
10	MF	(Germany) GER	Daniel Didavi	21	6	19	6	2	0
16	MF	(Germany) GER	Atakan Karazor	25	2	20+3	2	2	0
19	MF	(North Macedonia) MKD	Darko Churlinov	6	1	0+6	1	0	0
20	MF	(Germany) GER	Philipp Förster	28	3	22+4	3	2	0
21	MF	(Germany) GER	Philipp Klement	21	0	12+7	0	1+1	0
23	MF	(Belgium) BEL	Orel Mangala	32	1	22+7	1	3	0
25	MF	(Germany) GER	Lilian Egloff	4	0	0+3	0	0+1	0
31	MF	(Argentina) ARG	Mateo Klimowicz	8	0	1+6	0	0+1	0
Forwards
7	FW	(France) FRA	Tanguy Coulibaly	2	0	0+2	0	0	0
9	FW	(Austria) AUT	Saša Kalajdžić	6	1	2+4	1	0	0
14	FW	(Democratic Republic of the Congo) COD	Silas	31	8	18+11	7	1+1	1
18	FW	(Morocco) MAR	Hamadi Al Ghaddioui	30	10	13+15	8	0+2	2
22	FW	(Argentina) ARG	Nicolás González	29	15	21+6	14	2	1
27	FW	(Germany) GER	Mario Gómez	24	7	15+8	7	1	0
30	FW	(Germany) GER	Roberto Massimo	12	0	5+6	0	1	0
Players transferred out during the season
2	DF	(Argentina) ARG	Emiliano Insúa	6	0	6	0	0	0
6	MF	(Argentina) ARG	Santiago Ascacíbar	15	0	13	0	2	0
11	FW	(Greece) GRE	Anastasios Donis	1	0	0+1	0	0	0

Last updated: 28 June 2020
Source: Competitions
