= 2020–21 FC Bayern Munich season =

122nd season in existence of Bayern Munich

Bayern Munich
2020–21 season
- President: Herbert Hainer
- CEO: Karl-Heinz Rummenigge
- Head coach: Hansi Flick
- Stadium: Allianz Arena
- Bundesliga: 1st
- DFB-Pokal: Second round
- DFL-Supercup: Winners
- UEFA Champions League: Quarter-finals
- UEFA Super Cup: Winners
- FIFA Club World Cup: Winners
- Top goalscorer: League: Robert Lewandowski (41 goals); All: Robert Lewandowski (48 goals)
- Biggest win: 8–0 vs Schalke 04
- Biggest defeat: 1–4 vs 1899 Hoffenheim
Home colours	Away colours	Third colours

Fourth kit, used in the DFB-Pokal second round match against Holstein Kiel.
2021–22 away kit, used in the last home game of the season against FC Augsburg.

The 2020–21 season was the 122nd season in the existence of FC Bayern Munich and the club's 56th consecutive season in the top flight of German football. In addition to the domestic league, Bayern Munich participated in this season's editions of the DFB-Pokal, the DFL-Supercup, the UEFA Champions League, the UEFA Super Cup, and the FIFA Club World Cup. The season covered the period from 24 August 2020 to 30 June 2021.

Adding on to the three titles that made up their continental treble in the previous season, Bayern's victories in this campaign's DFL-Supercup, UEFA Super Cup and FIFA Club World Cup ensured that the club had won all six competitions they took part in across the 2020 calendar year, thus joining Barcelona in 2009 as the only other side to accomplish this "sextuple" in the history of European football.

The season was the first since 2012–13 without Thiago Alcântara, who departed to Liverpool.

== Players ==
=== First-team squad ===
As of 1 February 2021

Note: Flags indicate national team as defined under FIFA eligibility rules; some limited exceptions apply. Players may hold more than one non-FIFA nationality.

No.	Pos.	Nation	Player
1	GK	GER	Manuel Neuer (captain)
4	DF	GER	Niklas Süle
5	DF	FRA	Benjamin Pavard
6	MF	GER	Joshua Kimmich
7	MF	GER	Serge Gnabry
8	DF	ESP	Javi Martínez
9	FW	POL	Robert Lewandowski
10	MF	GER	Leroy Sané
11	MF	BRA	Douglas Costa (on loan from Juventus)
13	FW	CMR	Eric Maxim Choupo-Moting
15	FW	GER	Jann-Fiete Arp
17	DF	GER	Jérôme Boateng
18	MF	GER	Leon Goretzka

No.	Pos.	Nation	Player
19	MF	CAN	Alphonso Davies
20	DF	FRA	Bouna Sarr
21	DF	FRA	Lucas Hernandez
22	MF	ESP	Marc Roca
23	DF	FRA	Tanguy Nianzou
24	MF	FRA	Corentin Tolisso
25	FW	GER	Thomas Müller (vice-captain)
27	DF	AUT	David Alaba
28	MF	POR	Tiago Dantas (on loan from Benfica)
29	MF	FRA	Kingsley Coman
35	GK	GER	Alexander Nübel
39	GK	GER	Ron-Thorben Hoffmann
42	MF	GER	Jamal Musiala
44	DF	GER	Josip Stanišić

=== Players on loan ===
As of 1 February 2021

Note: Flags indicate national team as defined under FIFA eligibility rules; some limited exceptions apply. Players may hold more than one non-FIFA nationality.

No.	Pos.	Nation	Player
14	FW	NED	Joshua Zirkzee (at Parma until 30 June 2021)
30	MF	GER	Adrian Fein (at PSV Eindhoven until 30 June 2021)
33	DF	GER	Lars Lukas Mai (at SV Darmstadt until 30 June 2021)
34	FW	GER	Oliver Batista Meier (at SC Heerenveen until 30 June 2021)

No.	Pos.	Nation	Player
36	GK	GER	Christian Früchtl (at 1. FC Nürnberg until 30 June 2021)
41	DF	USA	Chris Richards (at 1899 Hoffenheim until 30 June 2021)
45	FW	GER	Leon Dajaku (at Union Berlin until 30 June 2021)
—	MF	FRA	Michaël Cuisance (at Marseille until 30 June 2021)

== Transfers ==
=== In ===
No.	Pos	Player	Transferred from	Fee	Date	Source
23	DF	(France) Tanguy Nianzou	(France) Paris Saint-Germain	Free transfer	1 July 2020	
35	GK	(Germany) Alexander Nübel	(Germany) Schalke 04	Free transfer	1 July 2020	
10	MF	(Germany) Leroy Sané	(England) Manchester City	€50,000,000	1 July 2020	
30	MF	(Germany) Adrian Fein	(Germany) Hamburger SV	Loan return	24 July 2020	
22	MF	(Spain) Marc Roca	(Spain) Espanyol	€15,000,000	4 October 2020	
20	DF	(France) Bouna Sarr	(France) Marseille	€10,000,000	4 October 2020	
11	MF	(Brazil) Douglas Costa	(Italy) Juventus	Loan	5 October 2020	
13	FW	(Cameroon) Eric Maxim Choupo-Moting	(France) Paris Saint-Germain	Free transfer	5 October 2020	
–	MF	(Portugal) Tiago Dantas	(Portugal) Benfica	Loan, will join Bayern Munich II	5 October 2020	
28	MF	(New Zealand) Sarpreet Singh	(Germany) 1. FC Nürnberg	Loan return	7 February 2021	

=== Out ===
No.	Pos	Player	Transferred to	Fee	Date	Source
2	DF	(Spain) Álvaro Odriozola	(Spain) Real Madrid	Loan return	End of season	
10	MF	(Brazil) Philippe Coutinho	(Spain) Barcelona	Loan return	End of season	
14	MF	(Croatia) Ivan Perišić	(Italy) Inter Milan	Loan return	End of season	
33	DF	(Germany) Lars Lukas Mai	(Germany) Darmstadt 98	Loan	21 July 2020	
28	MF	(New Zealand) Sarpreet Singh	(Germany) 1. FC Nürnberg	Loan	7 August 2020	
36	GK	(Germany) Christian Früchtl	(Germany) 1. FC Nürnberg	Loan	7 August 2020	
37	MF	(Germany) Paul Will	(Germany) Dynamo Dresden	Undisclosed	End of season	
34	MF	(Brazil) Oliver Batista Meier	(Netherlands) Heerenveen	Loan	End of season	
6	MF	(Spain) Thiago	(England) Liverpool	€30,000,000	18 September 2020	
26	GK	(Germany) Sven Ulreich	(Germany) Hamburger SV	€2,000,000	3 October 2020	
11	MF	(France) Michaël Cuisance	(France) Marseille	Loan	5 October 2020	
30	MF	(Germany) Adrian Fein	(Netherlands) PSV	Loan	5 October 2020	
14	FW	(Netherlands) Joshua Zirkzee	(Italy) Parma	Loan	1 February 2021	
41	DF	(United States) Chris Richards	(Germany) 1899 Hoffenheim	Loan	1 February 2021	
–	FW	(Sweden) Alex Timossi Andersson	Austria Klagenfurt	Loan	8 February 2021	

== Competitions ==
=== Overview ===
Competition	First match	Last match	Starting round	Final position	Record							
Competition	First match	Last match	Starting round	Final position	Pld	W	D	L	GF	GA	GD	Win %
Bundesliga	18 September 2020	22 May 2021	Matchday 1	Winners	34	24	6	4	99	44	+55	70.59
DFB-Pokal	15 October 2020	13 January 2021	First round	Second round	2	1	1	0	5	2	+3	50.00
DFL-Supercup	30 September 2020		Final	Winners	1	1	0	0	3	2	+1	100.00
UEFA Champions League	21 October 2020	13 April 2021	Group stage	Quarter-finals	10	8	1	1	27	10	+17	80.00
UEFA Super Cup	24 September 2020		Final	Winners	1	1	0	0	2	1	+1	100.00
FIFA Club World Cup	8 February 2021	11 February 2021	Semi-finals	Winners	2	2	0	0	3	0	+3	100.00
Total					50	37	8	5	139	59	+80	74.00

Source: Soccerway

=== Bundesliga ===
==== League table ====
Pos	Team	Pld	W	D	L	GF	GA	GD	Pts	Qualification or relegation
1	Bayern Munich (C)	34	24	6	4	99	44	+55	78	Qualification for the Champions League group stage
2	RB Leipzig	34	19	8	7	60	32	+28	65	Qualification for the Champions League group stage
3	Borussia Dortmund	34	20	4	10	75	46	+29	64	Qualification for the Champions League group stage
4	VfL Wolfsburg	34	17	10	7	61	37	+24	61	Qualification for the Champions League group stage
5	Eintracht Frankfurt	34	16	12	6	69	53	+16	60	Qualification for the Europa League group stage (Note: Since the winners of the 2020–21 DFB-Pokal, Borussia Dortmund, qualified for the Champions League based on league position, the Europa League group stage spot was passed to the sixth-placed team, and the Europa Conference League play-off round spot was passed to the seventh-placed team.)

Source: DFB
Rules for classification: 1) Points; 2) Goal difference; 3) Goals scored; 4) Head-to-head results; 5) Head-to-head away goals scored; 6) Away goals scored; 7) Play-off.
(C) Champions

==== Results summary ====
Overall								Home						Away					
Pld	W	D	L	GF	GA	GD	Pts	W	D	L	GF	GA	GD	W	D	L	GF	GA	GD
34	24	6	4	99	44	+55	78	13	4	0	64	21	+43	11	2	4	35	23	+12

Source: DFB

==== Results by round ====
Round	1	2	3	4	5	6	7	8	9	10	11	12	13	14	15	16	17	18	19	20	21	22	23	24	25	26	27	28	29	30	31	32	33	34
Ground	H	A	H	A	H	A	A	H	A	H	A	H	A	H	A	H	A	A	H	A	H	A	H	H	A	H	A	H	A	H	A	H	A	H
Result	W	L	W	W	W	W	W	D	W	D	D	W	W	W	L	W	W	W	W	W	D	L	W	W	W	W	W	D	W	W	L	W	D	W
Position	1	7	4	2	2	1	1	1	1	1	2	2	1	1	1	1	1	1	1	1	1	1	1	1	1	1	1	1	1	1	1	1	1	1

Source: DFB
A = Away; H = Home; W = Win; D = Draw; L = Loss

==== Matches ====
The league fixtures were announced on 7 August 2020.

18 September 2020 1	Bayern Munich	8–0	Schalke 04	Munich
20:30 CEST (UTC+2)	Gnabry 4', 47', 59'; Goretzka 19'; Lewandowski 31' (pen.); Kimmich (yellow card) 65'; Müller 70'; Sané 71'; Musiala 81'	Report	Kabak (yellow card) 30'; Stambouli (yellow card) 81'	Stadium: Allianz Arena; Attendance: 0 Referee: Felix Zwayer

27 September 2020 2	1899 Hoffenheim	4–1	Bayern Munich	Hoffenheim
15:30 CEST (UTC+2)	Bičakčić 16'; Geiger (yellow card) 21'; Dabbur 24'; Baumgartner (yellow card) 28'; Kramarić (yellow card) 45+1', (goal) 77', 90+1' (pen.)	Report	Kimmich 36'; Boateng (yellow card) 90+1'; Neuer (yellow card) 90+1'	Stadium: Rhein-Neckar-Arena; Attendance: 6,030; Referee: Benjamin Brand

4 October 2020 3	Bayern Munich	4–3	Hertha BSC	Munich
18:00 CEST (UTC+2)	Lewandowski 40', 51', 85', 90+2' (pen.), (yellow card) 90+4'; Hernandez (yellow card) 58'; Gnabry (yellow card) 85'	Report	Córdoba (yellow card) 13', (goal) 60'; Cunha 71'; Piątek (yellow card) 84'; Ngankam 88'; Mittelstädt (yellow card) 90+2'	Stadium: Allianz Arena; Attendance: 0 Referee: Benjamin Cortus

17 October 2020 4	Arminia Bielefeld	1–4	Bayern Munich	Bielefeld
18:30 CEST (UTC+2)	Dōan 58'; De Medina (yellow card) 74'	Report	Müller 8', 51'; Lewandowski 26', 45+1'; Tolisso (red card) 76'	Stadium: Bielefelder Alm; Attendance: 0 Referee: Daniel Siebert

24 October 2020 5	Bayern Munich	5–0	Eintracht Frankfurt	Munich
15:30 CEST (UTC+2)	Lewandowski 10', 26', 60'; Goretzka (yellow card) 17'; Boateng (yellow card) 45+2'; Kimmich (yellow card) 46'; Sané 72'; Musiala 90'	Report		Stadium: Allianz Arena; Attendance: 0 Referee: Markus Schmidt

31 October 2020 6	1. FC Köln	1–2	Bayern Munich	Cologne
15:30 CET (UTC+1)	Drexler 82'; Wolf (yellow card) 89'	Report	Choupo-Moting (yellow card) 10'; Müller 13' (pen.); Pavard (yellow card) 23'; Gnabry 45+1'	Stadium: RheinEnergieStadion; Attendance: 0 Referee: Frank Willenborg

7 November 2020 7	Borussia Dortmund	2–3	Bayern Munich	Dortmund
18:30 CET (UTC+1)	Reus 45'; Delaney (yellow card) 45+3'; Haaland 83'; Witsel (yellow card) 90+1'	Report	Kimmich (yellow card) 36'; Alaba 45+4'; Lewandowski 48', (yellow card) 82'; Sané 80'	Stadium: Signal Iduna Park; Attendance: 0 Referee: Manuel Gräfe

21 November 2020 8	Bayern Munich	1–1	Werder Bremen	Munich
15:30 CET (UTC+1)	Pavard (yellow card) 15'; Coman 62'	Report	Bittencourt (yellow card) 32'; Augustinsson (yellow card) 43'; Eggestein 45'; Pavlenka (yellow card) 90+4'	Stadium: Allianz Arena; Attendance: 0 Referee: Guido Winkmann

28 November 2020 9	VfB Stuttgart	1–3	Bayern Munich	Stuttgart
15:30 CET (UTC+1)	Coulibaly 20'	Report	Coman 38'; Lewandowski 45+1'; Costa 87'	Stadium: Mercedes-Benz Arena; Attendance: 0 Referee: Harm Osmers

5 December 2020 10	Bayern Munich	3–3	RB Leipzig	Munich
18:30 CET (UTC+1)	Musiala 30'; Müller 34', 75'	Report	Nkunku 19'; Kluivert 36'; Forsberg 48'; Mukiele (yellow card) 51'	Stadium: Allianz Arena; Attendance: 0 Referee: Daniel Siebert

12 December 2020 11	Union Berlin	1–1	Bayern Munich	Berlin
18:30 CET (UTC+1)	Prömel 4', (yellow card) 72'; Knoche (yellow card) 45'; Becker (yellow card) 79'	Report	Davies (yellow card) 30'; Gnabry (yellow card) 37'; Lewandowski 68'	Stadium: Stadion An der Alten Försterei; Attendance: 0 Referee: Bastian Dankert

16 December 2020 12	Bayern Munich	2–1	VfL Wolfsburg	Munich
20:30 CET (UTC+1)	Lewandowski 45+1', 50'; Gnabry (yellow card) 69'; Sané (yellow card) 84'; Coman (yellow card) 90'	Report	Philipp 5'; Arnold (yellow card) 34'	Stadium: Allianz Arena; Attendance: 0 Referee: Marco Fritz

19 December 2020 13	Bayer Leverkusen	1–2	Bayern Munich	Leverkusen
18:30 CET (UTC+1)	Schick 14'; Bailey (yellow card) 72'	Report	Gnabry (yellow card) 24'; Lewandowski 43', 90+3'	Stadium: BayArena; Attendance: 0 Referee: Felix Zwayer

3 January 2021 14	Bayern Munich	5–2	Mainz 05	Munich
18:00 CET (UTC+1)	Boateng (yellow card) 32'; Kimmich 50'; Sané 55'; Alaba (yellow card) 62'; Süle 70'; Lewandowski 76' (pen.), 83'	Report	Burkardt 32'; Hack 44'; Boëtius (yellow card) 59'	Stadium: Allianz Arena; Attendance: 0 Referee: Markus Schmidt

8 January 2021 15	Borussia Mönchengladbach	3–2	Bayern Munich	Mönchengladbach
20:30 CET (UTC+1)	Hofmann 36', 45'; Neuhaus 49'; Ginter (yellow card) 62'	Report	Lewandowski 20' (pen.); Goretzka 26'; Süle (yellow card) 63'	Stadium: Borussia-Park; Attendance: 0 Referee: Harm Osmers

17 January 2021 16	Bayern Munich	2–1	SC Freiburg	Munich
15:30 CET (UTC+1)	Lewandowski 7'; Müller 75'; Choupo-Moting (yellow card) 90'	Report	Höfler (yellow card) 9'; Sallai (yellow card) 46'; Petersen 62'	Stadium: Allianz Arena; Attendance: 0 Referee: Christian Dingert

20 January 2021 17	FC Augsburg	0–1	Bayern Munich	Augsburg
20:30 CET (UTC+1)	Khedira (yellow card) 15'; Uduokhai (yellow card) 62'; Finnbogason (penalty missed) 76'	Report	Lewandowski 13' (pen.)	Stadium: WWK Arena; Attendance: 0 Referee: Matthias Jöllenbeck

24 January 2021 18	Schalke 04	0–4	Bayern Munich	Gelsenkirchen
15:30 CET (UTC+1)	Nastasić (yellow card) 80'	Report	Müller 33', 88'; Lewandowski 54'; Boateng (yellow card) 84'; Alaba 90'	Stadium: Veltins-Arena; Attendance: 0 Referee: Sascha Stegemann

30 January 2021 19	Bayern Munich	4–1	1899 Hoffenheim	Munich
15:30 CET (UTC+1)	Boateng 32'; Müller 43'; Roca (yellow card) 53'; Lewandowski 57'; Gnabry 63'	Report	Kramarić 44'	Stadium: Allianz Arena; Attendance: 0 Referee: Benjamin Cortus

5 February 2021 20	Hertha BSC	0–1	Bayern Munich	Berlin
20:00 CET (UTC+1)	Darida (yellow card) 41'; Khedira (yellow card) 90+3'	Report	Lewandowski (penalty missed) 12'; Coman 21'; Pavard (yellow card) 31'	Stadium: Olympiastadion; Attendance: 0 Referee: Robert Schröder

15 February 2021 21	Bayern Munich	3–3	Arminia Bielefeld	Munich
20:30 CET (UTC+1)	Lewandowski 48'; Tolisso 58', (yellow card) 78'; Davies 70'	Report	Vlap 9'; Pieper 37'; Gebauer 49'; Kunze (yellow card) 80'	Stadium: Allianz Arena; Attendance: 0 Referee: Florian Badstübner

20 February 2021 22	Eintracht Frankfurt	2–1	Bayern Munich	Frankfurt
15:30 CET (UTC+1)	Kamada 12'; Younes 31'; Rode (yellow card) 56'; Ndicka (yellow card) 90+2'	Report	Lewandowski 53'	Stadium: Deutsche Bank Park; Attendance: 0 Referee: Sascha Stegemann

27 February 2021 23	Bayern Munich	5–1	1. FC Köln	Munich
15:30 CET (UTC+1)	Choupo-Moting 18'; Alaba (yellow card) 22'; Lewandowski 33', 65'; Sané (yellow card) 45+1'; Gnabry 82', 86'	Report	Czichos (yellow card) 45'; Skhiri 49'	Stadium: Allianz Arena; Attendance: 0 Referee: Martin Petersen

6 March 2021 24	Bayern Munich	4–2	Borussia Dortmund	Munich
18:30 CET (UTC+1)	Lewandowski 26', 44' (pen.), 90', (yellow card) 28'; Goretzka 88'	Report	Haaland 2', 9'; Meunier (yellow card) 29'	Stadium: Allianz Arena; Attendance: 0 Referee: Marco Fritz

13 March 2021 25	Werder Bremen	1–3	Bayern Munich	Bremen
15:30 CET (UTC+1)	Sargent (yellow card) 70'; Füllkrug 86'	Report	Goretzka 22'; Gnabry 35'; Lewandowski 67'	Stadium: Weser-Stadion; Attendance: 0 Referee: Manuel Gräfe

20 March 2021 26	Bayern Munich	4–0	VfB Stuttgart	Munich
15:30 CET (UTC+1)	Davies (red card) 12'; Lewandowski 18', 23', 39'; Gnabry 22'; Boateng (yellow card) 37'	Report	Castro (yellow card) 61'; Kempf (yellow card) 86'	Stadium: Allianz Arena; Attendance: 0 Referee: Daniel Schlager

3 April 2021 27	RB Leipzig	0–1	Bayern Munich	Leipzig
18:30 CEST (UTC+2)	Mukiele (yellow card) 26'; Sabitzer (yellow card) 37'; Upamecano (yellow card) 61'	Report	Kimmich (yellow card) 33'; Goretzka 38'; Hernandez (yellow card) 81'	Stadium: Red Bull Arena; Attendance: 0 Referee: Daniel Siebert

10 April 2021 28	Bayern Munich	1–1	Union Berlin	Munich
15:30 CEST (UTC+2)	Musiala 68'; Sarr (yellow card) 76'; Nianzou (yellow card) 83'	Report	Ingvartsen 86'	Stadium: Allianz Arena; Attendance: 0 Referee: Tobias Stieler

17 April 2021 29	VfL Wolfsburg	2–3	Bayern Munich	Wolfsburg
15:30 CEST (UTC+2)	Weghorst 35'; Philipp 54'; Paulo Otávio (yellow card) 57'; Mbabu (yellow card) 86'	Report	Musiala 15', 37'; Choupo-Moting 24'; Hernandez (yellow card) 79'	Stadium: Volkswagen Arena; Attendance: 0 Referee: Felix Zwayer

20 April 2021 30	Bayern Munich	2–0	Bayer Leverkusen	Munich
20:30 CEST (UTC+2)	Choupo-Moting 7'; Kimmich 13'	Report		Stadium: Allianz Arena; Attendance: 0 Referee: Guido Winkmann

24 April 2021 31	Mainz 05	2–1	Bayern Munich	Mainz
15:30 CEST (UTC+2)	Burkardt 3'; Quaison 37'; Mwene (yellow card) 58'; St. Juste (yellow card) 59'; Da Costa (yellow card) 87'	Report	Boateng (yellow card) 36'; Goretzka (yellow card) 41'; Alaba (yellow card) 42'; Lewandowski (yellow card) 73', (goal) 90+4'	Stadium: Opel Arena; Attendance: 0 Referee: Harm Osmers

8 May 2021 32	Bayern Munich	6–0	Borussia Mönchengladbach	Munich
18:30 CEST (UTC+2)	Lewandowski 2', 34', 66' (pen.); Müller 23'; Coman 44'; Nianzou (red card) 75'; Sané 85'	Report	Neuhaus (yellow card) 65'; Wolf (yellow card) 90'	Stadium: Allianz Arena; Attendance: 0 Referee: Tobias Stieler

15 May 2021 33	SC Freiburg	2–2	Bayern Munich	Freiburg
15:30 CEST (UTC+2)	Sallai (yellow card) 17'; Gulde 29'; Günter 81'	Report	Lewandowski 26' (pen.); Sané 53'; Davies (yellow card) 87'; Alaba (yellow card) 90'	Stadium: Schwarzwald-Stadion; Attendance: 0 Referee: Florian Badstübner

22 May 2021 34	Bayern Munich	5–2	FC Augsburg	Munich
15:30 CEST (UTC+2)	Gouweleeuw 9' (o.g.); Gnabry 23'; Kimmich 33'; Coman 43'; Hernandez (yellow card) 83'; Lewandowski 90'	Report	Caligiuri (penalty missed) 25'; Hahn 67'; Suchý (yellow card) 69'; Niederlechner 72'	Stadium: Allianz Arena; Attendance: 250; Referee: Markus Schmidt

=== DFB-Pokal ===
15 October 2020 (Note: The 1. FC Düren v Bayern Munich match, originally scheduled on 11 September 2020, 20:45, was rescheduled to 15 October 2020 following a request by Bayern Munich, as they had reached the 2020 UEFA Champions League Final in August and had a heavy schedule in September.) First round	1. FC Düren	0–3	Bayern Munich	Munich (Note: Due to the impact of the COVID-19 pandemic in Germany and the organisational effort required to host the fixture, the teams exchanged the home rights to the match.)
20:45 CEST (UTC+2)	Sobiech (yellow card) 69'	Report	Choupo-Moting 24', 75'; Müller 36' (pen.)	Stadium: Allianz Arena; Attendance: 0 (Note: The match was played behind closed doors due to the COVID-19 pandemic in Germany.); Referee: Matthias Jöllenbeck

13 January 2021 (Note: The Holstein Kiel v Bayern Munich match was rescheduled to 13 January 2021 following a request by Bayern Munich, as they had a heavy schedule in December.) Second round	Holstein Kiel	2–2 (a.e.t.) (6–5 p)	Bayern Munich	Kiel
20:45 CET (UTC+1)	Bartels 37'; Meffert (yellow card) 45+1'; Wahl 90+5'	Report	Gnabry 14'; Sané 48'; Süle (yellow card) 61'	Stadium: Holstein-Stadion; Attendance: 0 Referee: Robert Schröder
	Penalties
	Wahl (penalty scored); Arslan (penalty scored); Serra (penalty scored); Lee (penalty scored); Hauptmann (penalty scored); Bartels (penalty scored)		(penalty scored) Lewandowski; (penalty scored) Kimmich; (penalty scored) Müller; (penalty scored) Alaba; (penalty scored) Costa; (penalty missed) Roca

=== DFL-Supercup ===
30 September 2020 Final	Bayern Munich	3–2	Borussia Dortmund	Munich
20:30 CEST (UTC+2)	Tolisso 18'; Müller 32'; Hernandez (yellow card) 66'; Kimmich 82'	Report	Brandt 39'; Haaland 55'	Stadium: Allianz Arena; Attendance: 0 (Note: The match was played behind closed doors due to the COVID-19 pandemic in Germany.); Referee: Bibiana Steinhaus

=== UEFA Champions League ===
==== Group stage ====
The group stage draw was held on 1 October 2020.

Pos	Team	Pld	W	D	L	GF	GA	GD	Pts	Qualification	BAY	ATM	SAL	LMO
1	(Germany) Bayern Munich	6	5	1	0	18	5	+13	16	Advance to knockout phase	—	4–0	3–1	2–0
2	(Spain) Atlético Madrid	6	2	3	1	7	8	−1	9	Advance to knockout phase	1–1	—	3–2	0–0
3	(Austria) Red Bull Salzburg	6	1	1	4	10	17	−7	4	Transfer to Europa League	2–6	0–2	—	2–2
4	(Russia) Lokomotiv Moscow	6	0	3	3	5	10	−5	3		1–2	1–1	1–3	—

Source: UEFA
Rules for classification: Group stage tiebreakers

21 October 2020 1	Bayern Munich (Germany)	4–0	(Spain) Atlético Madrid	Munich, Germany
21:00 CEST (UTC+2)	Alaba (yellow card) 5'; Müller (yellow card) 21'; Coman 28', 72'; Goretzka 41'; Tolisso 66'	Report	Lodi (yellow card) 43'; Koke (yellow card) 44'; Herrera (yellow card) 45+1'; Torreira (yellow card) 90+2'	Stadium: Allianz Arena; Attendance: 0 (Note: Due to the COVID-19 pandemic in Europe, the match was played behind closed doors.); Referee: Michael Oliver (England)

27 October 2020 2	Lokomotiv Moscow (Russia)	1–2	(Germany) Bayern Munich	Moscow, Russia
20:55 MSK (UTC+3)	Zhivoglyadov (yellow card) 17'; Cerqueira (yellow card) 50'; An. Miranchuk 70'; Zhemaletdinov (yellow card) 84'	Report	Goretzka 13'; Hernandez (yellow card) 47'; Kimmich 79'	Stadium: RZD Arena; Attendance: 8,196; Referee: István Kovács (Romania)

3 November 2020 3	Red Bull Salzburg (Austria)	2–6	(Germany) Bayern Munich	Wals-Siezenheim, Austria
21:00 CET (UTC+1)	Berisha 4'; Camara (yellow card) 53'; Okugawa 66'; Mwepu (yellow card) 85'	Report	Lewandowski 21' (pen.), 88'; Pavard (yellow card) 23'; Kristensen 44' (o.g.); Gnabry (yellow card) 68'; Boateng 79'; Sané 83'; Hernandez 90+2'	Stadium: Stadion Wals-Siezenheim; Attendance: 0 Referee: Danny Makkelie (Netherlands)

25 November 2020 4	Bayern Munich (Germany)	3–1	(Austria) Red Bull Salzburg	Munich, Germany
21:00 CET (UTC+1)	Neuer (yellow card) 24'; Lewandowski 43'; Roca (yellow card) 48' (yellow-red card) 66'; Coman 52'; Sané 68'	Report	Koïta (yellow card) 58'; Berisha 73'; Camara (yellow card) 90+5'	Stadium: Allianz Arena; Attendance: 0 Referee: Orel Grinfeld (Israel)

1 December 2020 5	Atlético Madrid (Spain)	1–1	(Germany) Bayern Munich	Madrid, Spain
21:00 CET (UTC+1)	Félix 26'; Savić (yellow card) 86'	Report	Sarr (yellow card) 43'; Müller 86' (pen.)	Stadium: Wanda Metropolitano; Attendance: 0 Referee: Clément Turpin (France)

9 December 2020 6	Bayern Munich (Germany)	2–0	(Russia) Lokomotiv Moscow	Munich, Germany
21:00 CET (UTC+1)	Süle 63'; Boateng (yellow card) 64'; Sané (yellow card) 69'; Choupo-Moting 80'	Report	Zhivoglyadov (yellow card) 60'	Stadium: Allianz Arena; Attendance: 0 Referee: Sandro Schärer (Switzerland)

==== Knockout phase ====
===== Round of 16 =====
The draw for the round of 16 was held on 14 December 2020.

23 February 2021 First leg	Lazio (Italy)	1–4	(Germany) Bayern Munich	Rome, Italy
21:00 CET (UTC+1)	Luis Alberto (yellow card) 28'; Correa 49', (yellow card) 57'; Lucas (yellow card) 51'; Marušić (yellow card) 65'; Escalante (yellow card) 69'	Report	Lewandowski 9'; Musiala 24'; Sané 42'; Acerbi 47' (o.g.); Kimmich (yellow card) 72'; Coman (yellow card) 75'	Stadium: Stadio Olimpico; Attendance: 0 Referee: Orel Grinfeld (Israel)

17 March 2021 Second leg	Bayern Munich (Germany)	2–1 (6–2 agg.)	(Italy) Lazio	Munich, Germany
21:00 CET (UTC+1)	Lewandowski 33' (pen.); Goretzka (yellow card) 48'; Choupo-Moting 73'	Report	Radu (yellow card) 26'; Acerbi (yellow card) 31'; Milinković-Savić (yellow card) 39'; Correa (yellow card) 70'; Parolo 82'	Stadium: Allianz Arena; Attendance: 0 Referee: István Kovács (Romania)

===== Quarter-finals =====
The draw for the quarter-finals was held on 19 March 2021.

7 April 2021 First leg	Bayern Munich (Germany)	2–3	(France) Paris Saint-Germain	Munich, Germany
21:00 CEST (UTC+2)	Hernandez (yellow card) 35'; Choupo-Moting 37', (yellow card) 89'; Müller 60'; Kimmich (yellow card) 70'; Boateng (yellow card) 72'	Report	Mbappé 3', 68'; Marquinhos 28'; Draxler (yellow card) 62'	Stadium: Allianz Arena; Attendance: 0 Referee: Antonio Mateu Lahoz (Spain)

13 April 2021 Second leg	Paris Saint-Germain (France)	0–1 (3 (a)–3 agg.)	(Germany) Bayern Munich	Paris, France
21:00 CEST (UTC+2)	Dagba (yellow card) 55'; Herrera (yellow card) 90'	Report	Choupo-Moting 40'; Alaba (yellow card) 52'; Müller (yellow card) 68'	Stadium: Parc des Princes; Attendance: 0 Referee: Daniele Orsato (Italy)

=== UEFA Super Cup ===
24 September 2020 Final	Bayern Munich (Germany)	2–1 (a.e.t.)	(Spain) Sevilla	Budapest, Hungary
21:00 CEST (UTC+2)	Alaba (yellow card) 12'; Goretzka 34'; Hernandez (yellow card) 90+1'; Martínez 104'	Report	Ocampos 13' (pen.); Jordán (yellow card) 45+1'; Koundé (yellow card) 55'; Fernando (yellow card) 70'; Escudero (yellow card) 119'	Stadium: Puskás Aréna; Attendance: 15,180; Referee: Anthony Taylor (England)

=== FIFA Club World Cup ===
8 February 2021 Semi-finals	Al Ahly (Egypt)	0–2	(Germany) Bayern Munich	Al Rayyan, Qatar
21:00 AST (UTC+3)		Report	Lewandowski 17', 86'	Stadium: Ahmed bin Ali Stadium; Attendance: 7,982; Referee: Mohammed Abdulla Hassan Mohamed (United Arab Emirates)

11 February 2021 Final	Bayern Munich (Germany)	1–0	(Mexico) UANL	Al Rayyan, Qatar
21:00 AST (UTC+3)	Pavard 59'	Report	Dueñas (yellow card) 42'; Rodríguez (yellow card) 69'; Carioca (yellow card) 90'	Stadium: Education City Stadium; Attendance: 7,411; Referee: Esteban Ostojich (Uruguay)

== Statistics ==
=== Appearances and goals ===
No.	Pos	Nat	Player	Total		Bundesliga		DFB-Pokal		DFL-Supercup		Champions League		Super Cup		FIFA Club World Cup	
No.	Pos	Nat	Player	Apps	Goals	Apps	Goals	Apps	Goals	Apps	Goals	Apps	Goals	Apps	Goals	Apps	Goals
Goalkeepers
1	GK	(Germany) GER	Manuel Neuer	46	0	33	0	1	0	1	0	8	0	1	0	2	0
35	GK	(Germany) GER	Alexander Nübel	4	0	1	0	1	0	0	0	2	0	0	0	0	0
39	GK	(Germany) GER	Ron-Thorben Hoffmann	0	0	0	0	0	0	0	0	0	0	0	0	0	0
Defenders
4	DF	(Germany) GER	Niklas Süle	33	2	16+4	1	2	0	1	0	6+1	1	1	0	1+1	0
5	DF	(France) FRA	Benjamin Pavard	36	1	22+2	0	0+1	0	1	0	7	0	1	0	2	1
17	DF	(Germany) GER	Jérôme Boateng	39	2	29	1	1	0	0	0	6+1	1	0+1	0	1	0
19	DF	(Canada) CAN	Alphonso Davies	35	1	22+1	1	2	0	1	0	3+3	0	0+1	0	2	0
20	DF	(France) FRA	Bouna Sarr	15	0	5+3	0	2	0	0	0	2+3	0	0	0	0	0
21	DF	(France) FRA	Lucas Hernandez	37	1	18+5	0	1	0	1	0	7+3	1	1	0	1	0
23	DF	(France) FRA	Tanguy Nianzou	6	0	0+6	0	0	0	0	0	0	0	0	0	0	0
27	DF	(Austria) AUT	David Alaba	45	2	30+2	2	0+1	0	0	0	9	0	1	0	2	0
37	DF	(Germany) GER	Kilian Senkbeil	0	0	0	0	0	0	0	0	0	0	0	0	0	0
43	DF	(Germany) GER	Bright Arrey-Mbi	1	0	0	0	0	0	0	0	1	0	0	0	0	0
44	DF	(Germany) GER	Josip Stanišić	1	0	1	0	0	0	0	0	0	0	0	0	0	0
48	DF	(Germany) GER	Alexander Lungwitz	0	0	0	0	0	0	0	0	0	0	0	0	0	0
Midfielders
6	MF	(Germany) GER	Joshua Kimmich	39	6	25+2	4	1	0	1	1	7	1	1	0	2	0
7	MF	(Germany) GER	Serge Gnabry	38	11	20+7	10	1	1	0+1	0	3+3	0	1	0	2	0
8	MF	(Spain) ESP	Javi Martínez	30	1	4+15	0	1	0	1	0	1+7	0	0+1	1	0	0
10	MF	(Germany) GER	Leroy Sané	44	10	18+14	6	1	1	0	0	6+2	3	1	0	1+1	0
11	MF	(Brazil) BRA	Douglas Costa	20	1	3+8	1	1+1	0	0	0	2+4	0	0	0	0+1	0
18	MF	(Germany) GER	Leon Goretzka	32	8	18+6	5	0	0	0	0	7	2	1	1	0	0
22	MF	(Spain) ESP	Marc Roca	11	0	2+4	0	1+1	0	0	0	2	0	0	0	1	0
24	MF	(France) FRA	Corentin Tolisso	24	3	7+9	1	1	0	1	1	3	1	0+1	0	0+2	0
25	MF	(Germany) GER	Thomas Müller	46	15	31+1	11	2	1	1	1	8+1	2	1	0	1	0
28	MF	(Portugal) POR	Tiago Dantas	2	0	1+1	0	0	0	0	0	0	0	0	0	0	0
29	MF	(France) FRA	Kingsley Coman	39	8	23+6	5	0	0	1	0	7	3	0	0	2	0
32	MF	(Germany) GER	Christopher Scott	2	0	0+2	0	0	0	0	0	0	0	0	0	0	0
36	MF	(Germany) GER	Angelo Stiller	3	0	0	0	0+1	0	0	0	0+2	0	0	0	0	0
38	MF	(Latvia) LAT	Daniels Ontužāns	1	0	0	0	0+1	0	0	0	0	0	0	0	0	0
40	MF	(Germany) GER	Malik Tillman	0	0	0	0	0	0	0	0	0	0	0	0	0	0
42	MF	(Germany) GER	Jamal Musiala	37	7	7+19	6	2	0	0+1	0	2+4	1	0	0	0+2	0
Forwards
9	FW	(Poland) POL	Robert Lewandowski	40	48	28+1	41	0+1	0	1	0	6	5	1	0	2	2
13	FW	(Cameroon) CMR	Eric Maxim Choupo-Moting	32	9	8+14	3	1	2	0	0	4+3	4	0	0	0+2	0
15	FW	(Germany) GER	Jann-Fiete Arp	1	0	0	0	0+1	0	0	0	0	0	0	0	0	0
47	FW	(Germany) GER	Armindo Sieb	1	0	0	0	0+1	0	0	0	0	0	0	0	0	0
Players transferred out during the season
11	MF	(France) FRA	Mickaël Cuisance	1	0	0+1	0	0	0	0	0	0	0	0	0	0	0
14	FW	(Netherlands) NED	Joshua Zirkzee	5	0	1+2	0	0	0	0+1	0	0+1	0	0	0	0	0
26	GK	(Germany) GER	Sven Ulreich	0	0	0	0	0	0	0	0	0	0	0	0	0	0
30	MF	(Germany) GER	Adrian Fein	0	0	0	0	0	0	0	0	0	0	0	0	0	0
41	DF	(United States) USA	Chris Richards	7	0	1+2	0	0	0	0+1	0	1+2	0	0	0	0	0
45	MF	(Germany) GER	Leon Dajaku	1	0	0	0	0+1	0	0	0	0	0	0	0	0	0

Source: Competitions

=== Goalscorers ===
Rank	No.	Pos.	Nat.	Name	Bundesliga	DFB-Pokal	DFL-Supercup	Champions League	Super Cup	Club World Cup	Total
1	9	FW	(Poland)	Robert Lewandowski	41	0	0	5	0	2	48
2	25	FW	(Germany)	Thomas Müller	11	1	1	2	0	0	15
3	7	MF	(Germany)	Serge Gnabry	10	1	0	0	0	0	11
3	10	MF	(Germany)	Leroy Sané	6	1	0	3	0	0	10
5	13	FW	(Cameroon)	Eric Maxim Choupo-Moting	3	2	0	4	0	0	9
6	18	MF	(Germany)	Leon Goretzka	5	0	0	2	1	0	8
7	29	MF	(France)	Kingsley Coman	5	0	0	3	0	0	8
7	42	MF	(Germany)	Jamal Musiala	6	0	0	1	0	0	7
9	6	MF	(Germany)	Joshua Kimmich	4	0	1	1	0	0	6
10	24	MF	(France)	Corentin Tolisso	1	0	1	1	0	0	3
11	4	DF	(Germany)	Niklas Süle	1	0	0	1	0	0	2
11	17	DF	(Germany)	Jérôme Boateng	1	0	0	1	0	0	2
11	27	DF	(Austria)	David Alaba	2	0	0	0	0	0	2
14	5	DF	(France)	Benjamin Pavard	0	0	0	0	0	1	1
14	8	MF	(Spain)	Javi Martínez	0	0	0	0	1	0	1
14	11	MF	(Brazil)	Douglas Costa	1	0	0	0	0	0	1
14	19	DF	(Canada)	Alphonso Davies	1	0	0	0	0	0	1
14	21	DF	(France)	Lucas Hernandez	0	0	0	1	0	0	1
Own goals					1	0	0	2	0	0	3
Totals					99	5	3	27	2	3	139
