= Joshua Kimmich =

German footballer (born 1995)

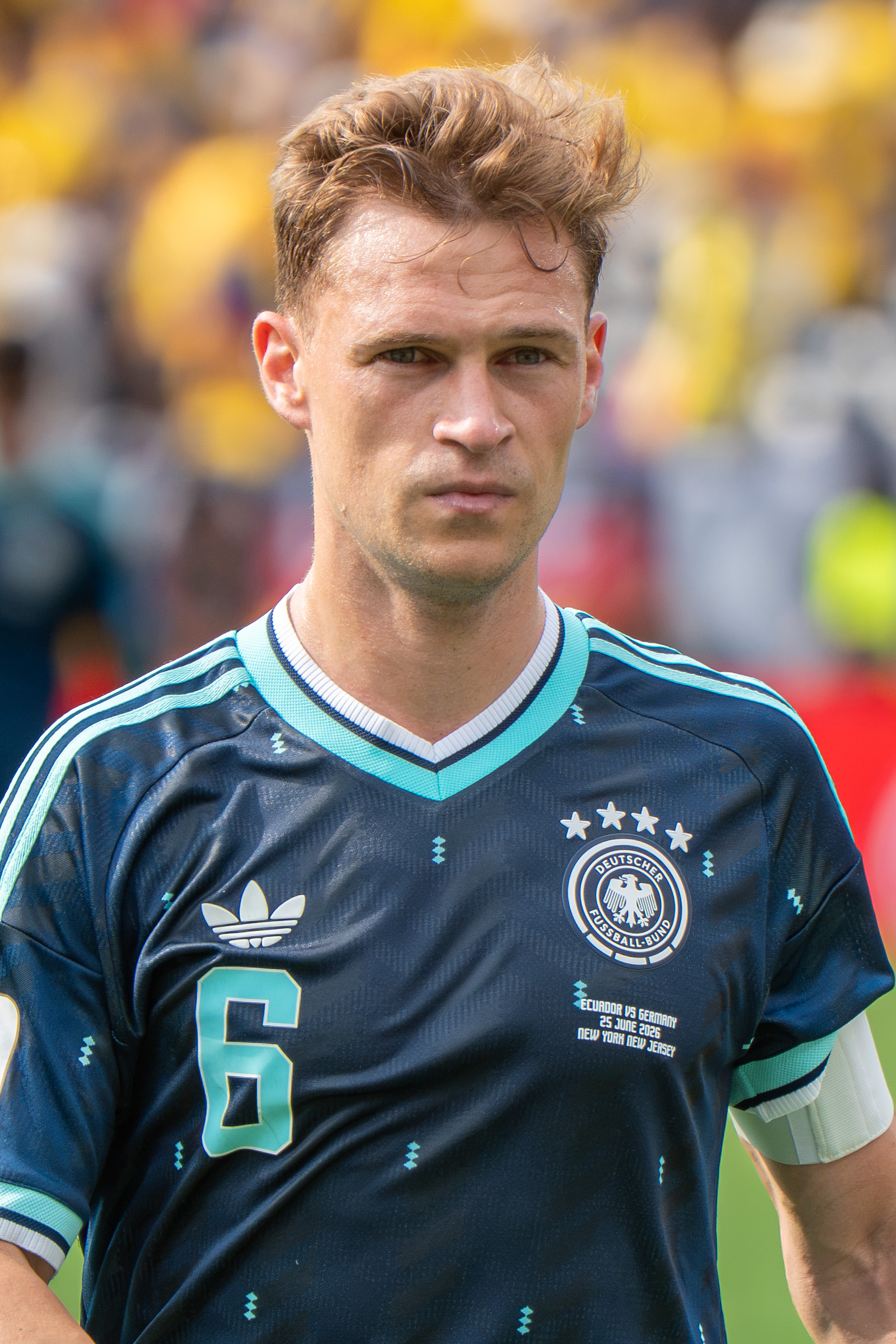
- Kimmich with Germany in 2026

Personal information
- Full name: Joshua Walter Kimmich
- Date of birth: 8 February 1995 (age 31)
- Place of birth: Rottweil, Germany
- Height: 1.77 m (5 ft 10 in)
- Positions: Defensive midfielder; right-back

Team information
- Current team: Bayern Munich
- Number: 6

Youth career
- 2006–2007: VfB Bösingen
- 2007–2013: VfB Stuttgart

Senior career*
Years	Team	Apps	(Gls)
2013–2015	RB Leipzig	53	(3)
2015–	Bayern Munich	333	(32)

International career^{‡}
2011	Germany U17	2	(0)
2013	Germany U18	5	(0)
2013–2014	Germany U19	9	(1)
2014–2015	Germany U21	14	(2)
2016–	Germany	118	(10)
Medal record
Men's football
Representing Germany
FIFA Confederations Cup
Winner	2017 Russia
UEFA European Under-19 Championship
Winner	2014 Hungary
- * Club domestic league appearances and goals as of 21:24, 20 November 2026 (UTC) ‡ National team caps and goals as of 21:45, 16 November 2026 (UTC)

Joshua Walter Kimmich (German pronunciation: [ˈjoːzu̯aː ˈkɪmɪç]; born 8 February 1995) is a German professional footballer who plays as a defensive midfielder or right-back for Bundesliga club Bayern Munich and captains the Germany national team. Known for his versatility, aggression and playmaking ability, he has been compared with former Bayern Munich and Germany captain Philipp Lahm.

After coming through VfB Stuttgart's youth academy, Kimmich joined RB Leipzig's first team on loan in 2013. Two years later, he joined Bayern Munich. In the 2019–20 season, he won the continental treble with Bayern Munich (UEFA Champions League, Bundesliga, DFB-Pokal) and was included in the UEFA Team of the Year. The following season, he won another Bundesliga title, and the DFL-Supercup.

A former youth international for Germany, Kimmich won the 2014 UEFA European Under-19 Championship with his country's under-21 side. A senior international since 2016, he has earned 114 caps for the national team, making the squads for the 2018, 2022, and 2026 editions of the FIFA World Cup, as well as the 2016, 2020, 2024 campaigns for the UEFA European Championship, and won the FIFA Confederations Cup in 2017.

== Club career ==
=== Early career ===
Kimmich played youth football for VfB Stuttgart. He joined RB Leipzig on loan in July 2013 in search of playing time, as Stuttgart were reluctant to promote him from the youth to the reserve team. Stuttgart secured an option to rebuy. He made his 3. Liga debut for the club on 28 September of that year, as a substitute for Thiago Rockenbach in a 2–2 draw with SpVgg Unterhaching. He scored his first professional goal in a 3–2 victory over 1. FC Saarbrücken on 30 November 2013. He finished the 2013–14 season with one goal in 26 appearances.

Kimmich scored his first goal of the 2014–15 season in a 3–2 victory against Union Berlin on 1 March 2015. He finished the 2014–15 season with two goals in 29 appearances.

Kimmich left the club with a tally of three goals in 53 league appearances for the club.

=== Bayern Munich ===
==== 2015–2017 ====
On 2 January 2015, Kimmich agreed to join Bayern Munich on a five-year contract lasting until 30 June 2020, for a reported fee of €7 million, most of which went to VfB Stuttgart. He made his debut for the club on 9 August, starting in the first round of the DFB-Pokal against FC Nöttingen. Pep Guardiola gave him his Bundesliga debut the following month on 12 September when he entered play as a late substitute at home against FC Augsburg. Four days later, Kimmich made his first appearance in the UEFA Champions League in Bayern's tournament opener away at Olympiakos and he started in the Bundesliga for the first time three days thereafter, playing 90 minutes against SV Darmstadt 98 in a 3–0 victory.

Kimmich ended his first season at Bayern having made 23 league appearances of which 15 were starts. He also played the full 120 minutes in Bayern's 2016 DFB-Pokal Final defeat of Borussia Dortmund at the Berlin Olympiastadion on 21 May.

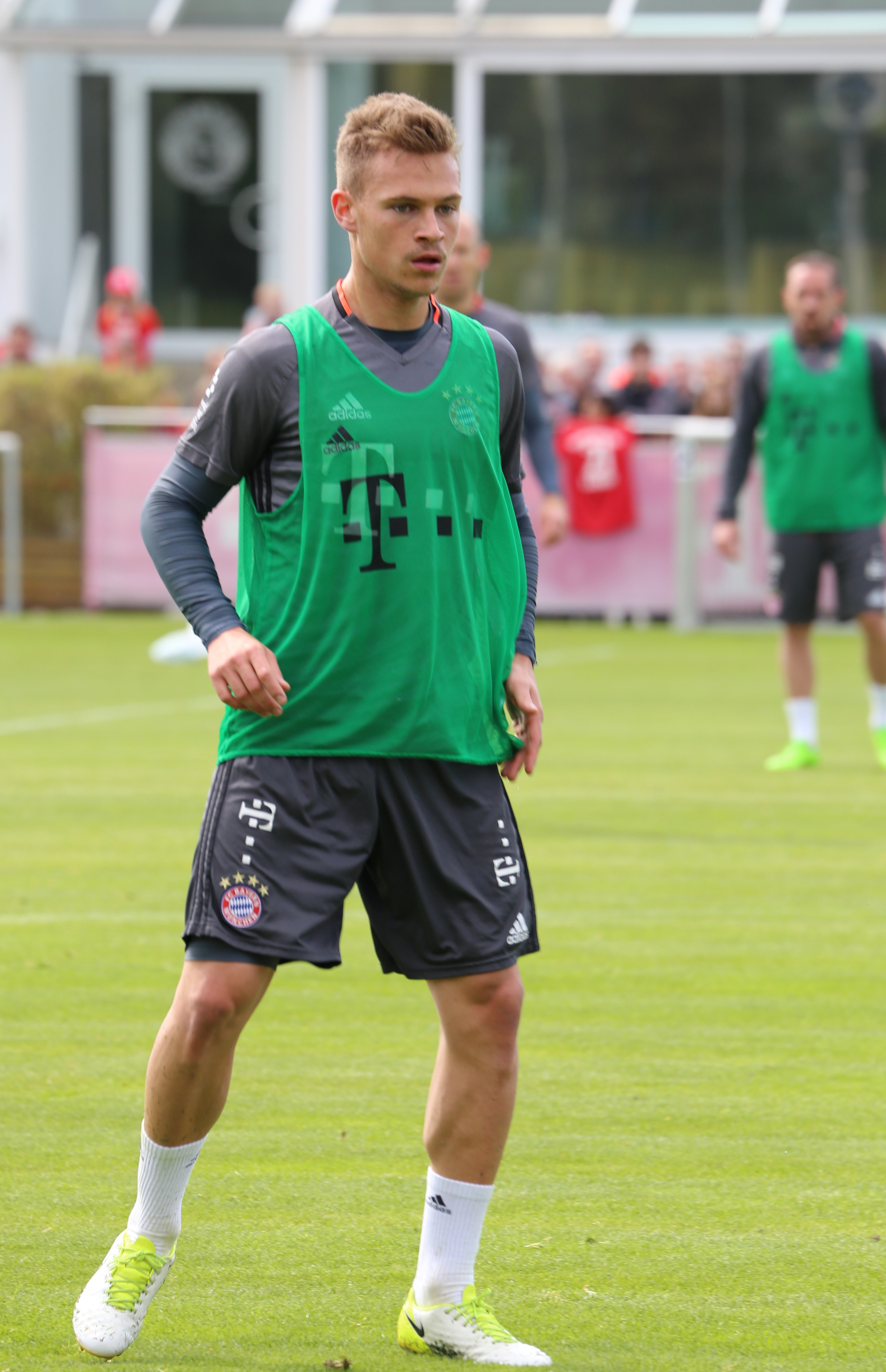
Kimmich training with Bayern Munich in 2017

Kimmich started the 2016–17 season by coming on as a substitute in a 2–0 win against Borussia Dortmund in the 2016 DFL-Supercup. On 9 September, he scored his first goal for FC Bayern in a 2–0 Bundesliga, away win at FC Schalke 04. Four days later, he scored his first two Champions League goals in a 5–0 home win against FC Rostov. Kimmich scored a late winning goal in the 88th minute in a 1–0 away victory over Hamburger SV. He finished the 2016–17 season with nine goals in forty appearances.

==== 2017–2020 ====
After Philipp Lahm's retirement, Kimmich took over his position and began playing as a right-back. He played in the 2017 DFL-Supercup and won the title as Bayern defeated their arch-rival Borussia Dortmund on 5–4 penalties after the extra time ended 2–2. On 16 September, he provided overall three assists to Thomas Müller, Arjen Robben and Robert Lewandowski's goals to defeat 1. FSV Mainz 05 with a 4–0 victory. On 9 March 2018, Kimmich signed a three-year contract extension which lasts until 30 June 2023. He managed to score each goal in both the first and second leg in the Champions League semi-final tie against Real Madrid, but his side were knocked out from the competition on 4–3 aggregate. Kimmich finished the 2017–18 season with six goals and seventeen assists in 47 appearances.

On 12 August, Kimmich started the 2018–19 season by playing in the German Super Cup and also won the title as his side defeated Eintracht Frankfurt with a 5–0 victory. The following week, on 18 August 2018, Kimmich played in the 1–0 win against SV Drochtersen/Assel in the first round of the German Cup. Kimmich played in the opening match of the Bundesliga season against 1899 Hoffenheim on 24 August 2018. Bayern won the match 3–1. Kimmich's first goal of the season came against Hannover 96 on 15 December 2018. He made his 100th league appearance for the club on 9 February 2019 during a 3–1 win over rivals, Schalke.

Kimmich played every single minute in all 34 matches in the Bundesliga. In those 34 matches, Kimmich scored two goals and finished second in the league with 13 assists. On 14 August 2020, Kimmich scored one goal and provided an assist in an 8–2 win over Barcelona in the 2019–20 UEFA Champions League quarter-final. On 23 August 2020, Kimmich made an important assist for the winning goal against Paris Saint-Germain by Kingsley Coman in the final, to be his first Champions League title along with his teammate Serge Gnabry, another VfB Stuttgart academy product.

==== 2020–2024 ====
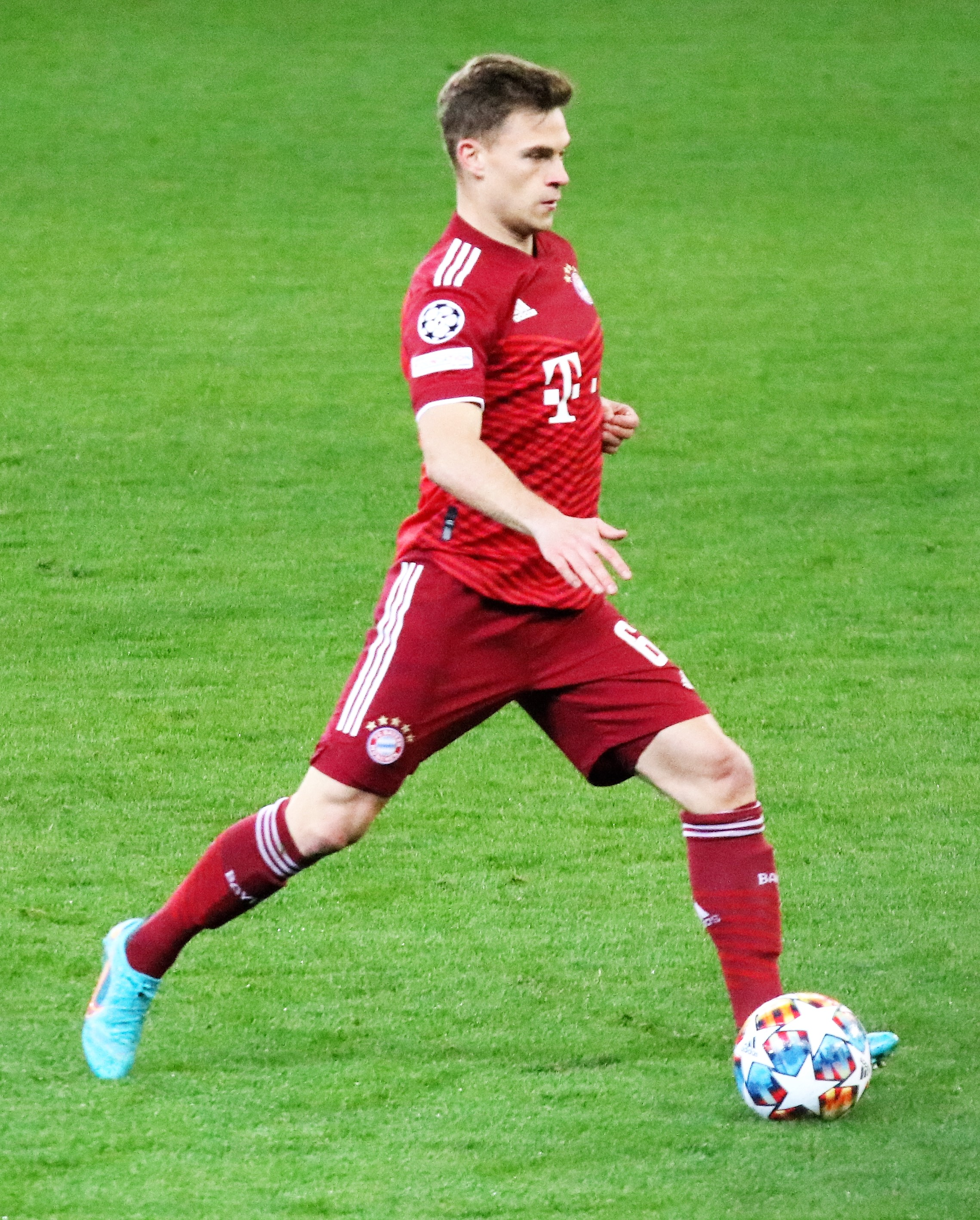
Kimmich playing for Bayern Munich in 2022

Kimmich started the 2020–21 season by acquiring the number 6 shirt, after Thiago Alcântara, who had worn it for seven years, departed the club for Liverpool. In addition, he transitioned to the defensive midfielder position under coach Hansi Flick. On 30 September 2020, he scored the winning goal in a 3–2 win over Borussia Dortmund in the 2020 DFL-Supercup. On 27 October, he netted the decisive goal in a 2–1 away victory over Lokomotiv Moscow in the 2020–21 UEFA Champions League.

On 23 August 2021, Kimmich signed a new contract with Bayern, keeping him at the club until 2025. On 24 January 2023, he scored a goal from a distance of 25 meters, to equalize the match 1–1 against 1. FC Köln in the 90th minute.

On 28 October 2023, he received his first straight red card at senior level in the 4th minute, having previously been sent off with Stuttgart U19 in 2013, in a match which witnessed two red cards for the opponent and an 8–0 victory over Darmstadt. On 17 April 2024, Kimmich scored the only goal in a 1–0 victory over Arsenal to secure a 3–2 aggregate win in the quarter-finals, helping Bayern into the semi-finals of the 2023–24 UEFA Champions League, reaching that stage for the first time since winning the title in 2019–20. In the latter half of the 2023–24 season, he played as a right-back under coach Thomas Tuchel.

==== 2025–present ====
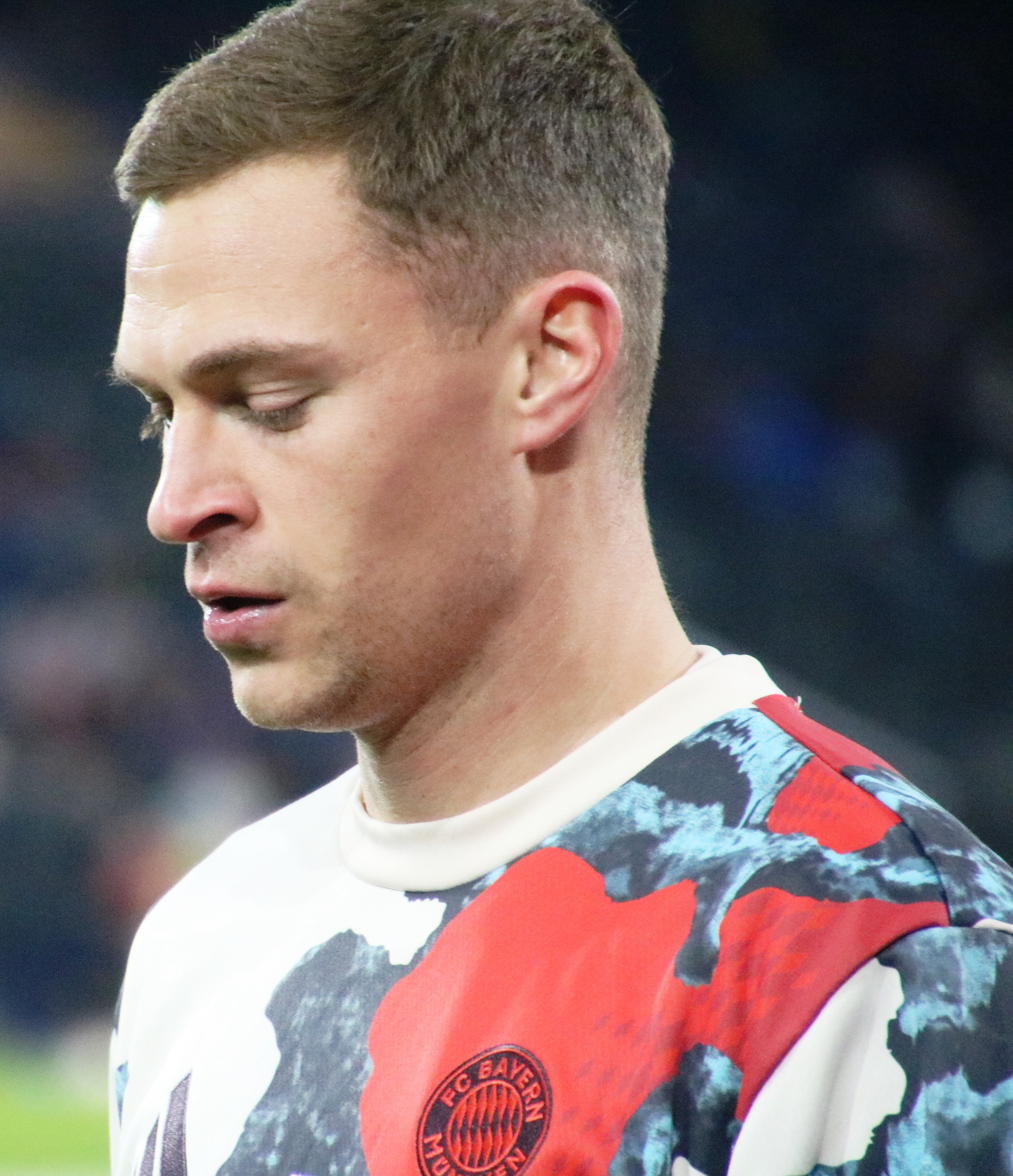
Kimmich with Bayern Munich in 2025

On 13 March 2025, Kimmich extended his contract with Bayern until 2029. The extension came after a period in which Kimmich was strongly courted with a lucrative offer by Paris Saint-Germain, in addition to efforts by manager Luis Enrique and sporting advisor Luís Campos, who reportedly viewed him as a key long-term midfield target. Under Vincent Kompany, Kimmich was permanently reinstated in central midfield, where he led the Bundesliga in touches, completed passes and total passes during Bayern's 2024–25 season. Later that year, on 4 November, he reached his 100th Champions League appearance in a 2–1 away victory over Paris Saint-Germain. At the conclusion of the 2025–26 season, he won his tenth Bundesliga title with Bayern Munich.

On 13 September 2026, he made his 500th competitive appearance in all competitions for Bayern Munich.

== International career ==
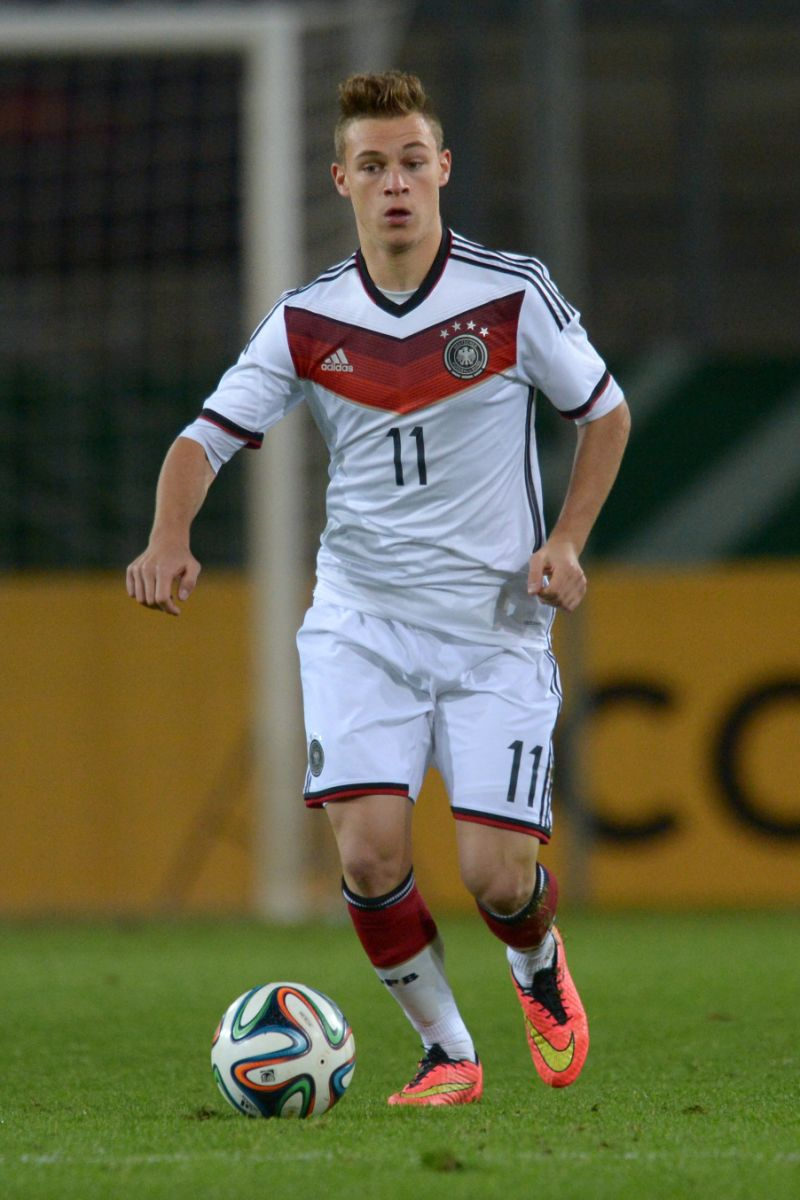
Kimmich playing for Germany U19 in 2014

On 17 May 2016, Kimmich was named in Germany's preliminary 27-man squad for UEFA Euro 2016. On 29 May, he made his international debut in a 3–1 home friendly defeat against Slovakia. On 31 May, Kimmich was named in the final 23-man squad and given the shirt number 21. On 21 June, Kimmich was selected to start for Germany in their final Group C match against Northern Ireland, replacing Benedikt Höwedes at right-back. Kimmich remained Germany's first-choice right-back as they reached the semi-finals and was named in UEFA's Team of the Tournament.

On 4 September 2016, Kimmich scored his debut goal for the Germany national team in a 3–0 victory over Norway during 2018 FIFA World Cup qualification.

On 17 May 2017, Kimmich was included in Joachim Löw's Germany squad for the 2017 FIFA Confederations Cup. On 6 June 2017, he scored from a stunning overhead kick in a friendly against Denmark in the 88th minute of the game which helped Germany to grab their late equaliser against Denmark, as the match ended up 1–1.

On 4 June 2018, Kimmich was selected for Germany's final 23-man squad by Joachim Löw for the 2018 FIFA World Cup. On 17 June 2018, Kimmich made his World Cup debut against Mexico in their opening match, but the game ended in a 1–0 loss for Germany. On 6 September 2018, Kimmich started Germany's UEFA Nations League opener against France, playing as a defensive midfielder for the first time in 18 months.

On 19 May 2021, he was selected to the squad for the UEFA Euro 2020. On 4 June 2022, he played the entire 90 minutes in a 1–1 draw against Italy in a group game in the 2022–23 UEFA Nations League and scored a goal in the process. Ten days later, he scored a goal in a 5–2 win against the same opponent. On 10 November 2022, he was named in the 26-man squad for the 2022 FIFA World Cup in Qatar.

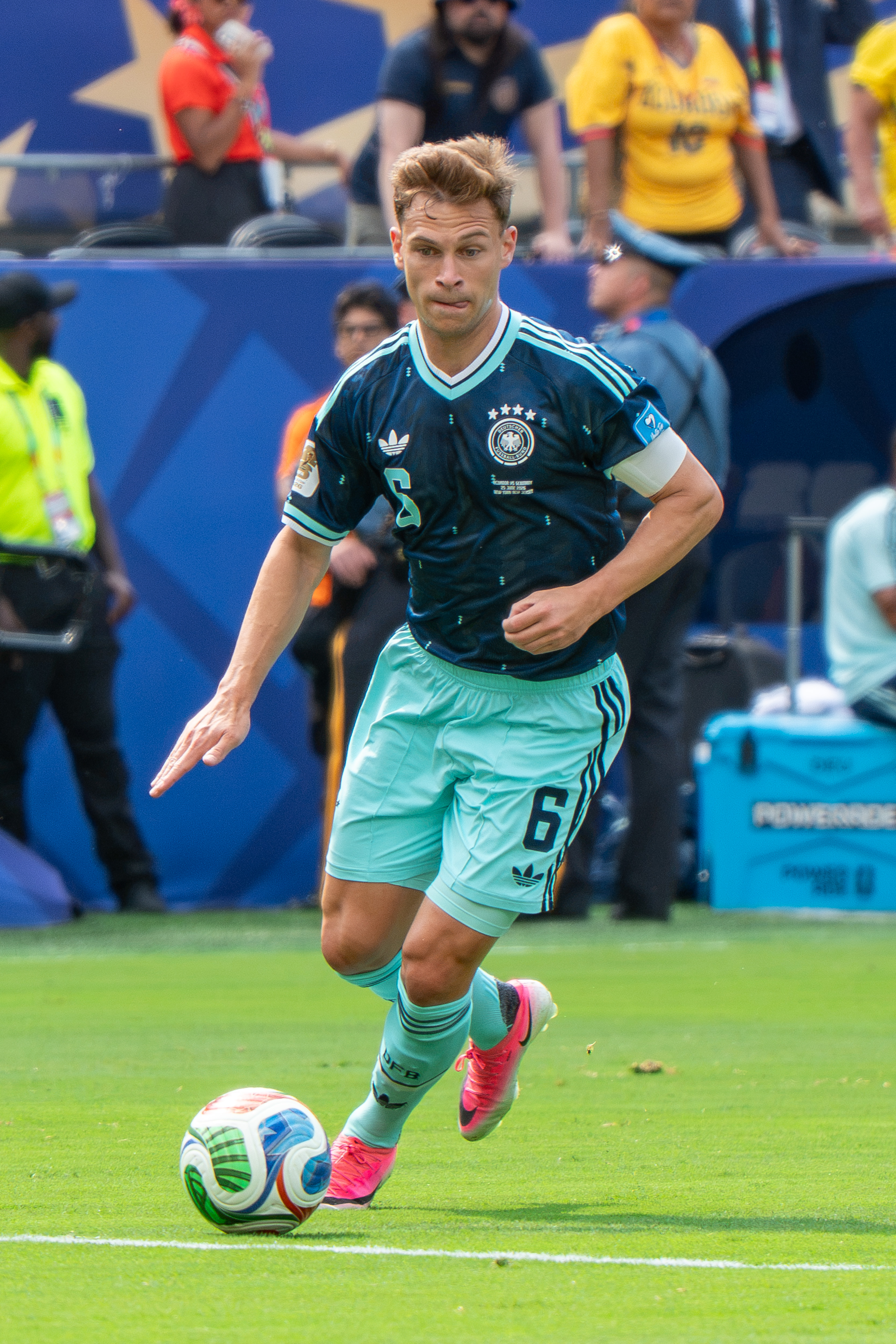
Kimmich with Germany in the 2026 FIFA World Cup

On 7 June 2024, Kimmich was named in Julian Nagelsmann's Germany squad for UEFA Euro 2024. In September 2024, he was appointed as captain of the German national team, succeeding previous captain and Bayern teammate Manuel Neuer. On 4 June 2025, Kimmich played his 100th match with the German national team against Portugal in the 2024–25 UEFA Nations League, in which he assisted Florian Wirtz's goal.

On 21 May 2026, he was selected in Germany's 26-man squad for the 2026 FIFA World Cup. Playing at right-back, he provided two assists in Germany's opening 7–1 victory over Curaçao. He helped Germany reach the knockout stage for the first time since 2014. In the Round of 32 against Paraguay, he converted his penalty in the shootout and urged teammates to step forward for the sixth kick; however, four players, including his Bayern Munich teammate Leon Goretzka, declined to take it. Jonathan Tah eventually stepped up but missed, resulting in Paraguay's victory and Germany's elimination. Following the elimination, he acknowledged that Germany had not performed well throughout the tournament and accepted that the team deserved to be eliminated.

== Style of play ==
Horst Hrubesch has praised Kimmich for his versatility, saying "Joshua has enormous quality and is versatile in both attacking and defensive roles," also describing him as "an intelligent player with good technical skills and agility" and as "a winner."

Remarking on Kimmich's versatility, a 2017 article on the Bundesliga's official website referred to him as a "veritable Swiss Army knife of a player", citing Pep Guardiola's conversion of a player he once referred to as "one of the best defensive midfielder in the world" into a right-back. He has also been used as a make-shift centre-back on occasion, as a central midfielder, or as a deep-lying playmaker, due to his ability to dictate play in midfield. In 2015, Guardiola described Kimmich as a promising player, and noted that he "...has everything a player needs. He is very intelligent, always aggressive toward the ball, strong in the air, has an eye for free space, has superb vision and knows when to charge forward and when to sit back."

Amin Younes complimented Kimmich's defensive awareness as well in an interview, after the U21 EURO group stage. "Winning the ball back superbly. He does that really well", Younes told to the media. During the U21 competition, Philip Röber of UEFA.com, described Kimmich's playing style on the website and compared him to İlkay Gündoğan, but other critics compared him to retired Bayern captain Philipp Lahm.

At Leipzig, he was part of an extremely attack-minded team in which his ball-winning qualities in front of a high back four shone through. In the Germany U21 side, he has a deeper role, but he has also caught the eye as a tidy defensive midfielder. Kimmich has great timing in his tackles, can dribble and does not mind putting in the legwork.

Kimmich is also known for his precise passing and crossing, and is a striker of the ball. Kimmich himself has cited Bastian Schweinsteiger, Xabi Alonso, and Xavi as some of his inspirations.

== Personal life ==
Kimmich married his long-time girlfriend, Lina Meyer in 2022. The couple has four children, a son, born in 2019, a daughter, born in October 2020, with their third child being born in 2022, and their fourth in 2024.

== Outside football ==
Kimmich launched an online initiative "We Kick Corona" with his then-Bayern Munich teammate Leon Goretzka, to help charitable, social or medical institutions during the COVID-19 pandemic. Despite his early support for that initiative, he remained unvaccinated against COVID. His unvaccinated status caused him to miss important matches for both the Germany national team and Bayern. After testing positive for COVID in November 2021 and reportedly experiencing multiple side effects including decreased lung capacity, Kimmich publicly stated that he regretted his hesitancy and stated he would be receiving the vaccination.

In March 2023, he featured in the German crime series Tatort.

== Career statistics ==
=== Club ===
As of match played 20 November 2026

Appearances and goals by club, season and competition
Club	Season	League			DFB-Pokal		Europe		Other		Total	
Club	Season	Division	Apps	Goals	Apps	Goals	Apps	Goals	Apps	Goals	Apps	Goals
RB Leipzig	2013–14	3. Liga	26	1	0	0	—		0	0	26	1
RB Leipzig	2014–15	2. Bundesliga	27	2	2	0	—		—		29	2
RB Leipzig	Total		53	3	2	0	—		0	0	55	3
Bayern Munich	2015–16	Bundesliga	23	0	4	0	9 (Note: Appearances in UEFA Champions League)	0	0	0	36	0
Bayern Munich	2016–17	Bundesliga	27	6	4	0	8	3	1 (Note: Appearance in DFL-/Franz Beckenbauer Supercup)	0	40	9
Bayern Munich	2017–18	Bundesliga	29	1	6	1	11	4	1	0	47	6
Bayern Munich	2018–19	Bundesliga	34	2	6	0	7	0	1	0	48	2
Bayern Munich	2019–20	Bundesliga	33	4	6	1	11	2	1	0	51	7
Bayern Munich	2020–21	Bundesliga	27	4	1	0	7	1	4 (Note: One appearance in UEFA Super Cup, one appearance and one goal in DFL-Supercup, two appearances in FIFA Club World Cup)	1	39	6
Bayern Munich	2021–22	Bundesliga	28	3	2	0	8	0	1	0	39	3
Bayern Munich	2022–23	Bundesliga	33	5	4	1	9	1	1	0	47	7
Bayern Munich	2023–24	Bundesliga	28	1	2	0	12	1	1	0	43	2
Bayern Munich	2024–25	Bundesliga	33	3	3	0	14	0	5 (Note: Appearances in FIFA Club World Cup)	0	55	3
Bayern Munich	2025–26	Bundesliga	29	2	6	0	13	0	1	0	49	2
Bayern Munich	2026–27	Bundesliga	9	1	1	0	3	0	1	0	14	1
Bayern Munich	Total		333	32	45	3	112	12	18	1	508	48
Career total			386	34	47	3	112	12	18	1	563	51

=== International ===
As of match played 16 November 2026

Appearances and goals by national team and year
National team	Year	Apps	Goals
Germany	2016	11	1
Germany	2017	14	2
Germany	2018	13	0
Germany	2019	10	0
Germany	2020	2	0
Germany	2021	14	0
Germany	2022	10	2
Germany	2023	8	1
Germany	2024	15	1
Germany	2025	9	3
Germany	2026	12	0
Total		118	10

As of match played 10 October 2025. Germany score listed first, score column indicates score after each Kimmich goal.

List of international goals scored by Joshua Kimmich
No.	Date	Venue	Cap	Opponent	Score	Result	Competition
1	4 September 2016	Ullevaal Stadion, Oslo, Norway	7	Norway	2–0	3–0	2018 FIFA World Cup qualification
2	6 June 2017	Brøndby Stadium, Brøndbyvester, Denmark	14	Denmark	1–1	1–1	Friendly
3	5 October 2017	Windsor Park, Belfast, Northern Ireland	23	Northern Ireland	3–0	3–1	2018 FIFA World Cup qualification
4	4 June 2022	Stadio Renato Dall'Ara, Bologna, Italy	65	Italy	1–1	1–1	2022–23 UEFA Nations League A
5	14 June 2022	Borussia-Park, Mönchengladbach, Germany	68	Italy	1–0	5–2	2022–23 UEFA Nations League A
6	12 June 2023	Weserstadion, Bremen, Germany	77	Ukraine	3–3	3–3	Friendly
7	10 September 2024	Johan Cruyff Arena, Amsterdam, Netherlands	93	Netherlands	2–1	2–2	2024–25 UEFA Nations League A
8	23 March 2025	Westfalenstadion, Dortmund, Germany	99	Italy	1–0	3–3	2024–25 UEFA Nations League A
9	10 October 2025	Rhein-Neckar-Arena, Sinsheim, Germany	104	Luxembourg	2–0	4–0	2026 FIFA World Cup qualification
10	10 October 2025	Rhein-Neckar-Arena, Sinsheim, Germany	104	Luxembourg	4–0	4–0	2026 FIFA World Cup qualification

== Honours ==
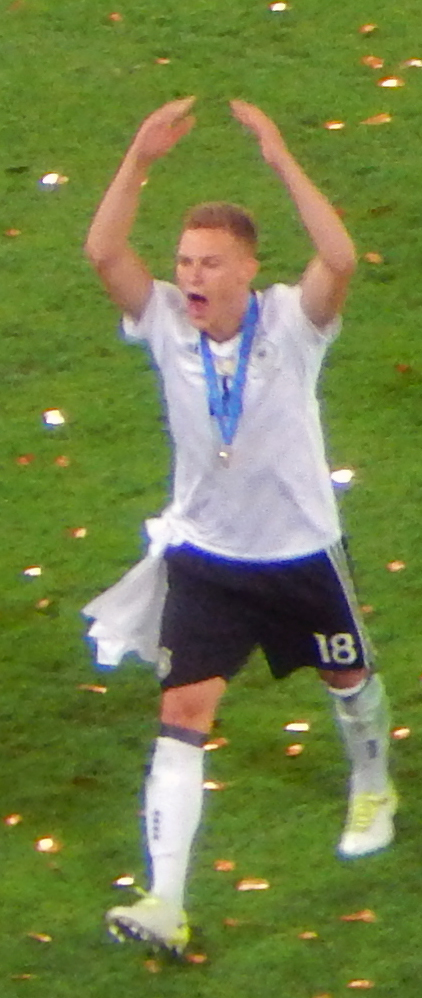
Kimmich celebrating the win of the 2017 FIFA Confederations Cup

Bayern Munich

- Bundesliga: 2015–16, 2016–17, 2017–18, 2018–19, 2019–20, 2020–21, 2021–22, 2022–23, 2024–25, 2025–26
- DFB-Pokal: 2015–16, 2018–19, 2019–20, 2025–26
- DFL/Franz Beckenbauer Supercup: 2016, 2017, 2018, 2020, 2021, 2022, 2025, 2026
- UEFA Champions League: 2019–20
- UEFA Super Cup: 2020
- FIFA Club World Cup: 2020

Germany U19

- UEFA European Under-19 Championship: 2014

Germany

- FIFA Confederations Cup: 2017

Individual

- Fritz Walter Medal U19 Bronze: 2014
- UEFA European Championship Team of the Tournament: 2016
- UEFA Champions League Breakthrough XI: 2016
- Germany national Player of the Year: 2017, 2021
- UEFA Champions League Squad of the Season: 2017–18, 2019–20
- UEFA Champions League Defender of the Season: 2019–20
- UEFA Team of the Year: 2020
- FIFPRO World 11: 2020
- FIFA Club World Cup Bronze Ball: 2020
- ESM Team of the Year: 2018–19
- Bundesliga Team of the Season: 2017–18, 2018–19, 2019–20, 2020–21, 2021–22, 2025–26
- kicker Bundesliga Team of the Season: 2018–19, 2019–20, 2020–21, 2024–25, 2025–26
- VDV Bundesliga Team of the Season: 2017–18, 2018–19, 2019–20, 2020–21, 2021–22, 2022–23, 2024–25, 2025–26
- Bundesliga Goal of the Month: May 2020, September 2020, December 2024
- IFFHS Men's World Team: 2020

== See also ==
- List of men's footballers with 100 or more international caps
