= Hamadi Al Ghaddioui =

German footballer (born 1990)

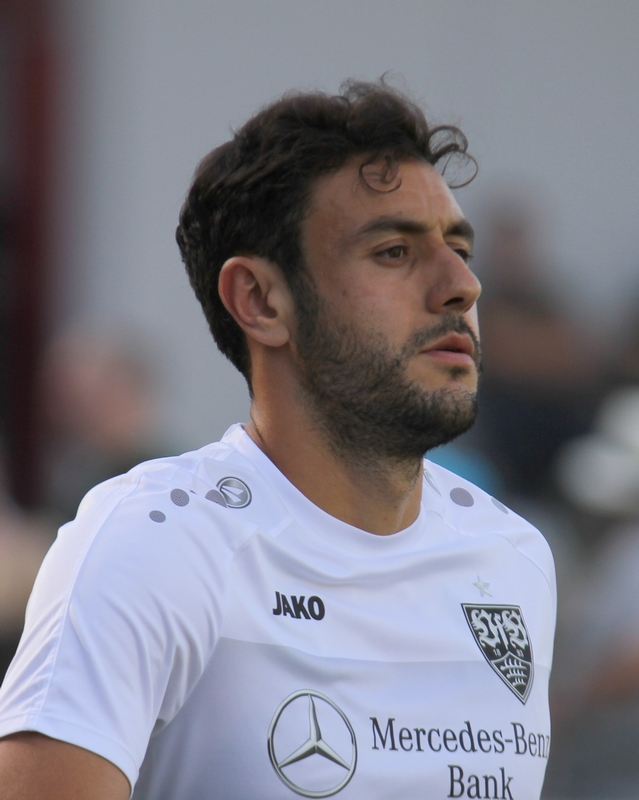
- Al Ghaddioui in 2019

Personal information
- Date of birth: 22 September 1990 (age 36)
- Place of birth: Bonn, West Germany
- Height: 1.90 m (6 ft 3 in)
- Position: Forward

Team information
- Current team: Fortuna Köln
- Number: 18

Youth career
- Turnerbund 1906 Witterschlick
- 1. SF Brüser Berg

Senior career*
| Years | Team | Apps | (Gls) |
| 2011–2014 | Bayer Leverkusen II | 90 | (16) |
| 2014–2016 | SC Verl | 60 | (29) |
| 2016–2017 | Borussia Dortmund II | 33 | (19) |
| 2017–2018 | Sportfreunde Lotte | 20 | (7) |
| 2018–2019 | Jahn Regensburg | 38 | (11) |
| 2019–2022 | VfB Stuttgart | 44 | (10) |
| 2021–2022 | VfB Stuttgart II | 2 | (1) |
| 2022–2023 | Pafos | 21 | (4) |
| 2023 | SV Sandhausen | 10 | (0) |
| 2023–2024 | SC Freiburg II | 36 | (4) |
| 2024–2025 | KFC Uerdingen | 21 | (4) |
| 2025– | Fortuna Köln | 31 | (12) |
- * Club domestic league appearances and goals as of 18:16, 4 June 2026 (UTC)

Hamadi Al Ghaddioui (born 22 September 1990) is a German professional footballer who plays as a forward for 3. Liga club Fortuna Köln.

== Club career ==
Al Ghaddioui previously played for SC Verl, the second team of Borussia Dortmund and Sportfreunde Lotte before joining Jahn Regensburg in the 2018 winter transfer window.

In the summer of 2019, Al Ghaddioui moved to VfB Stuttgart.

On 14 January 2022, Pafos announced the signing of Al Ghaddioui for an undisclosed fee from VfB Stuttgart. On 25 January 2023, Pafos announced that Al Ghaddioui was leaving the club to join an unnamed 2. Bundesliga club.

On 26 January 2023, Al Ghaddioui signed with SV Sandhausen.

On 28 June 2023, Al Ghaddioui joined SC Freiburg II in 3. Liga.

On 7 September 2024, Al Ghaddioui joined KFC Uerdingen 05 in Regionalliga.

== Personal life ==
Born in Germany, Al Ghaddioui is of Moroccan descent.

== Career statistics ==
As of match played 16 May 2026

Appearances and goals by club, season and competition
| Club | Season | League | | | National cup (Note: Includes DFB-Pokal, Cypriot Cup) | | Other | | Total | |
| Club | Season | Division | Apps | Goals | Apps | Goals | Apps | Goals | Apps | Goals |
|---|---|---|---|---|---|---|---|---|---|---|
| Bayer Leverkusen II | 2011–12 | Regionalliga West | 30 | 3 | — | | — | | 30 | 3 |
| Bayer Leverkusen II | 2012–13 | Regionalliga West | 32 | 9 | — | | — | | 32 | 9 |
| Bayer Leverkusen II | 2013–14 | Regionalliga West | 28 | 4 | — | | — | | 28 | 4 |
| Bayer Leverkusen II | Total | | 90 | 16 | — | | 0 | 0 | 90 | 16 |
| SC Verl | 2014–15 | Regionalliga West | 27 | 12 | — | | — | | 27 | 12 |
| SC Verl | 2015–16 | Regionalliga West | 33 | 16 | — | | — | | 33 | 16 |
| SC Verl | Total | | 60 | 28 | 0 | 0 | 0 | 0 | 60 | 28 |
| Borussia Dortmund II | 2016–17 | Regionalliga West | 33 | 19 | — | | — | | 33 | 19 |
| Sportfreunde Lotte | 2017–18 | 3. Liga | 20 | 7 | — | | — | | 20 | 7 |
| Jahn Regensburg | 2017–18 | 2. Bundesliga | 5 | 0 | 0 | 0 | — | | 5 | 0 |
| Jahn Regensburg | 2018–19 | 2. Bundesliga | 33 | 11 | 0 | 0 | — | | 33 | 11 |
| Jahn Regensburg | Total | | 38 | 11 | 0 | 0 | 0 | 0 | 38 | 11 |
| VfB Stuttgart | 2019–20 | 2. Bundesliga | 28 | 8 | 2 | 2 | — | | 30 | 10 |
| VfB Stuttgart | 2020–21 | Bundesliga | 6 | 0 | 1 | 0 | — | | 7 | 0 |
| VfB Stuttgart | 2021–22 | Bundesliga | 10 | 2 | 2 | 1 | — | | 12 | 3 |
| VfB Stuttgart | Total | | 44 | 10 | 5 | 3 | 0 | 0 | 49 | 13 |
| VfB Stuttgart II | 2020–21 | Regionalliga Südwest | 2 | 1 | – | | — | | 30 | 10 |
| Pafos | 2021–22 | Cypriot First Division | 13 | 3 | 0 | 0 | — | | 13 | 3 |
| Pafos | 2022–23 | Cypriot First Division | 9 | 1 | 1 | 1 | — | | 10 | 2 |
| Pafos | Total | | 22 | 4 | 1 | 1 | — | | 23 | 5 |
| SV Sandhausen | 2022–23 | 2. Bundesliga | 10 | 0 | 1 | 0 | — | | 11 | 0 |
| SC Freiburg II | 2023–24 | 3. Liga | 36 | 4 | — | | — | | 36 | 4 |
| KFC Uerdingen | 2024–25 | Regionalliga West | 21 | 4 | — | | — | | 21 | 4 |
| Fortuna Köln | 2025–26 | Regionalliga West | 31 | 12 | — | | — | | 31 | 12 |
| Career total | | | 407 | 116 | 7 | 4 | 0 | 0 | 414 | 120 |

== Honours ==
Fortuna Köln

- Regionalliga West: 2025–26
