= Adrian Fein =

German footballer (born 1999)

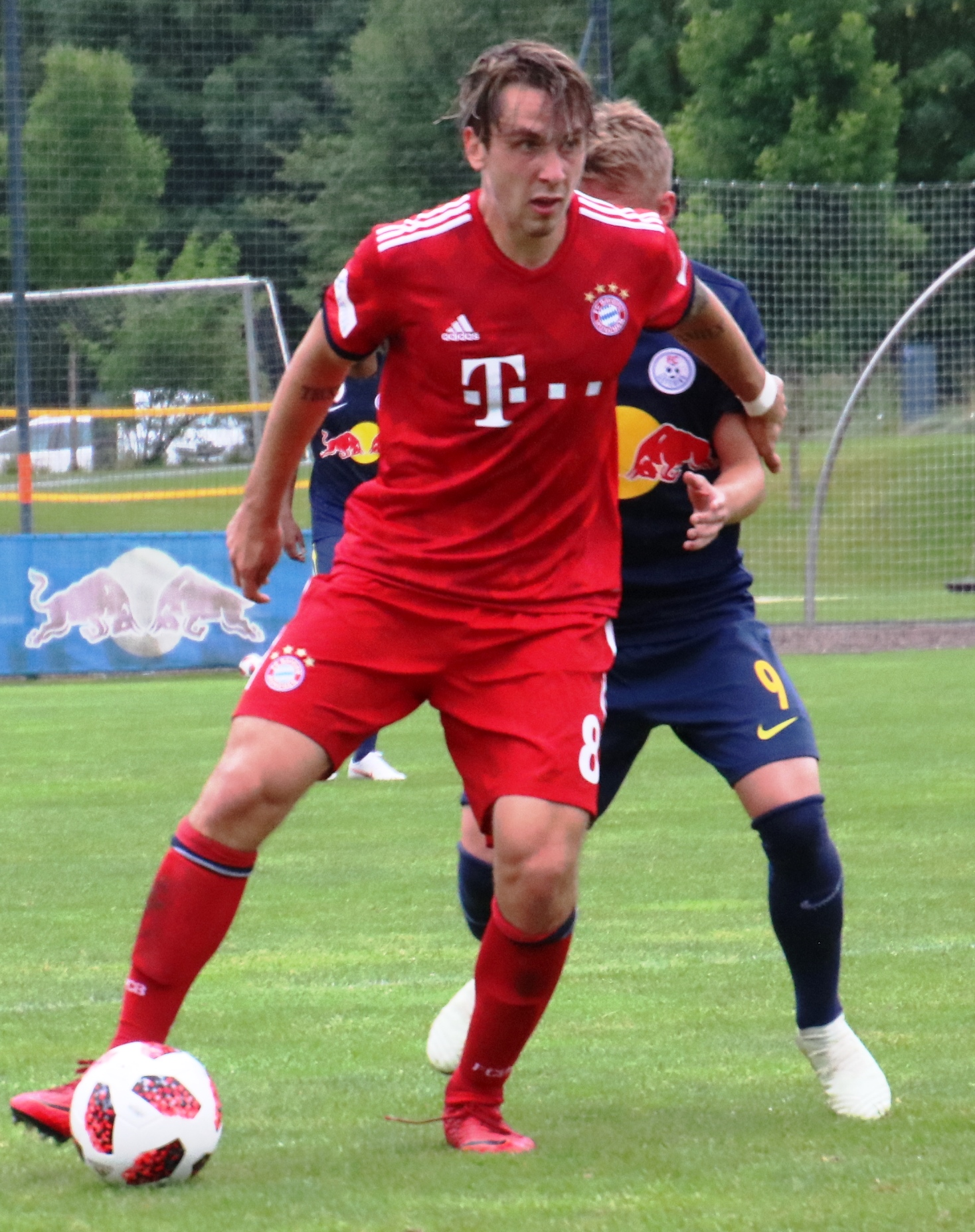
- Fein playing for Bayern Munich II in 2018

Personal information
- Date of birth: 18 March 1999 (age 27)
- Place of birth: Munich, Germany
- Height: 1.86 m (6 ft 1 in)
- Position: Midfielder

Team information
- Current team: Jahn Regensburg
- Number: 29

Youth career
- 2003–2005: SV Helios Daglfing
- 2005–2006: 1860 Munich
- 2006–2017: Bayern Munich

Senior career*
Years	Team	Apps	(Gls)
2017–2020	Bayern Munich II	34	(3)
2018–2019	→ Jahn Regensburg (loan)	21	(0)
2019–2020	→ Hamburger SV (loan)	31	(1)
2020–2022	Bayern Munich	0	(0)
2020–2021	→ PSV (loan)	13	(1)
2021–2022	→ Greuther Fürth (loan)	3	(0)
2022	→ Dynamo Dresden (loan)	0	(0)
2022–2024	Excelsior	14	(0)
2024	SC Verl	8	(0)
2024–2025	Waldhof Mannheim	21	(0)
2025–	Jahn Regensburg	42	(3)

International career^{‡}
2016	Germany U18	4	(0)
2017–2018	Germany U19	7	(1)
2018	Germany U20	1	(0)
2019	Germany U21	5	(1)
- * Club domestic league appearances and goals as of 14:54, 26 September 2026 (UTC) ‡ National team caps and goals as of 17 November 2019

Adrian Fein (born 18 March 1999) is a German professional footballer who plays as a midfielder for 3. Liga club Jahn Regensburg. He has represented Germany internationally at various youth levels.

== Club career ==
Fein began playing football at the age of four at SV Helios Daglfing, a club based in his hometown Munich. He also had a spell at TSV 1860 Munich, before joining the Bayern Munich youth setup in 2006. In 2017, he was assigned to the reserves squad, making 27 appearances and scoring once in the 2017–18 Regionalliga season.

On 1 September 2018, Fein joined 2. Bundesliga side SSV Jahn Regensburg on a season-long loan. He debuted on 23 September, in a 5–0 away win over Hamburger SV. He ended the season with a total of 21 appearances.

On 18 June 2019, Fein signed for Hamburger SV, once again on loan for one season. On 26 October, he scored the last goal in a 6–2 win over VfB Stuttgart.

Fein returned to Bayern Munich ahead of the 2020–21 season as a first team squad member. On 6 October 2020, Bayern reached an agreement with PSV Eindhoven for the season-long loan of Fein, with an option to buy.

On 14 July 2021, he joined Greuther Fürth on loan. His loan at Fürth was cut short in January 2022, and he moved on loan to Dynamo Dresden instead.

On 24 August 2022, Fein signed a two-year contract with recently promoted Eredivisie club Excelsior on a free transfer.

On 29 January 2024, Fein returned to Germany and signed with SC Verl.

On 16 July 2024, Fein moved to Waldhof Mannheim.

On 13 August 2025, Fein returned to Jahn Regensburg on a one-season deal.

== International career ==
Fein has been capped by Germany at U18, U19, U20 and U21 levels.

== Career statistics ==
As of match played 26 September 2026

Appearances and goals by club, season and competition
Club	Season	League			Cup		Continental		Other		Total	
Club	Season	Division	Apps	Goals	Apps	Goals	Apps	Goals	Apps	Goals	Apps	Goals
Bayern Munich II	2017–18	Regionalliga Bayern	27	1	—		—		—		27	1
Bayern Munich II	2018–19	Regionalliga Bayern	6	1	—		—		—		6	1
Bayern Munich II	2020–21	3. Liga	1	1	—		—		—		1	1
Bayern Munich II	Total		34	3	—		—		—		34	3
Jahn Regensburg (loan)	2018–19	2. Bundesliga	21	0	0	0	—		—		21	0
Hamburger SV (loan)	2019–20	2. Bundesliga	31	1	2	0	—		—		33	1
Bayern Munich	2020–21	Bundesliga	0	0	0	0	0	0	0	0	0	0
PSV (loan)	2020–21	Eredivisie	13	1	2	0	3 (Note: Appearances in the Europa League)	0	—		18	1
Greuther Fürth (loan)	2021–22	Bundesliga	3	0	1	0	—		—		4	0
Dynamo Dresden (loan)	2021–22	2. Bundesliga	0	0	0	0	—		—		0	0
Excelsior	2022–23	Eredivisie	14	0	1	0	0	0	0	0	15	0
Excelsior	2023–24	Eredivisie	0	0	0	0	0	0	0	0	0	0
Excelsior	Total		14	0	1	0	0	0	0	0	15	0
SC Verl	2023–24	3. Liga	8	0	0	0	—		—		8	0
SV Waldhof Mannheim	2024–25	3. Liga	21	0	0	0	—		—		21	0
SSV Jahn Regensburg	2025–26	3. Liga	35	1	0	0	—		—		35	1
SSV Jahn Regensburg	2026–27	3. Liga	7	2	—		—		—		7	2
SSV Jahn Regensburg	Total		42	3	0	0	0	0	0	0	42	3
Career total			187	8	6	0	3	0	0	0	196	8

== Honours ==
Bayern Munich

- DFL-Supercup: 2020
- UEFA Super Cup: 2020
