= Marc-Oliver Kempf =

German footballer (born 1995)

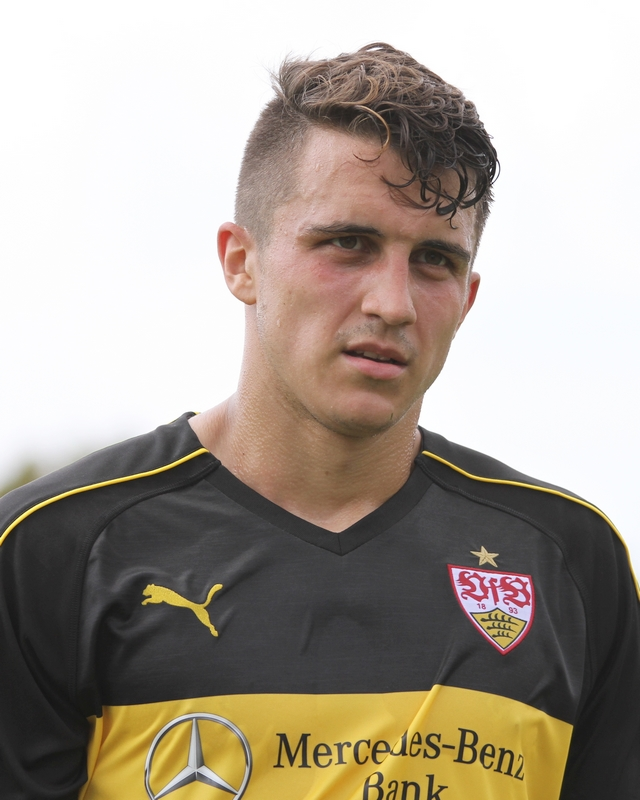
- Kempf with VfB Stuttgart in 2018

Personal information
- Date of birth: 28 January 1995 (age 31)
- Place of birth: Lich, Hesse, Germany
- Height: 1.86 m (6 ft 1 in)
- Position: Centre-back

Team information
- Current team: Como
- Number: 2

Youth career
- 1998–2005: TSV Dorn-Assenheim
- 2005–2006: SV Bruchenbrücken
- 2006–2007: JSG Bad Nauheim
- 2007–2014: Eintracht Frankfurt

Senior career*
Years	Team	Apps	(Gls)
2012–2014	Eintracht Frankfurt	5	(0)
2013–2014	Eintracht Frankfurt II	18	(3)
2014–2017	SC Freiburg II	10	(0)
2014–2018	SC Freiburg	68	(7)
2018–2022	VfB Stuttgart	78	(8)
2022–2024	Hertha BSC	69	(5)
2024–	Como	72	(4)

International career^{‡}
2010–2011	Germany U16	5	(1)
2011–2012	Germany U17	14	(0)
2012	Germany U18	1	(0)
2013–2014	Germany U19	18	(0)
2015–2016	Germany U20	7	(0)
2017	Germany U21	7	(1)
Medal record
Winner	European U19 Championship	2014
Winner	European U21 Championship	2017
- * Club domestic league appearances and goals as of 22:12, 4 November 2026 (UTC) ‡ National team caps and goals as of 21:26, 30 June 2017 (UTC)

Marc-Oliver Kempf (German pronunciation: [maʁk ˈʔɔliˌvɐ kɛmpf]; born 28 January 1995) is a German professional footballer who plays as a centre-back for Serie A club Como.

== Club career ==
Kempf started his career at Eintracht Frankfurt, appearing for both the reserves and the senior team. He made his Bundesliga debut, starting in a 3–1 home defeat against Mainz on 27 November 2012.

On 15 July 2014, Kempf joined SC Freiburg on an immediate transfer from Frankfurt. The transfer fee reportedly amounted to €800,000. He scored his first Bundesliga goal in a 2–2 draw with Hertha BSC on 19 September 2014.

On 14 May 2018, Kempf signed a four-year-contract with VfB Stuttgart, enabling him to join the team on a free transfer on 1 July 2018. He scored his first goal for the club in a 3–2 home defeat against Mainz on 19 January 2019. Following the club's relegation to the 2. Bundesliga and the departure of Christian Gentner, head coach Tim Walter appointed Kempf as captain of the club in July 2019.

On 25 January 2022, Kempf signed a contract with Hertha BSC until 2026. He netted his first goal at the club in a 2–1 win over his former club VfB Stuttgart on 6 May 2023.

On 28 August 2024, Kempf moved to Como in Italy on a three-season contract. A year later, on 21 September, he scored his first Serie A goal in a 2–1 away win over Fiorentina. On 19 October 2025, he scored in a 2–0 win over Juventus, helping his club secure its first victory against them since 1952.

== International career ==
Kempf made five appearances for the U16 national team. He also played for the U17 national team, with which he participated in the U17 European Championship in Slovenia in the summer of 2012, and for the U18 national team. In 2013, he started playing for the U19 national team and won the U19 European Championship in Hungary with them. He made his debut for the U20 national team on 3 September 2014 in a 0–1 defeat against the Italy U20.

He scored his first goal for the U21s on 21 June 2017 in a 3–0 group stage victory against the Denmark U21 during the 2017 U21 European Championship in Poland. Kempf played every minute of every game during the competition, where he won the title with the Germany U21 team.

== Career statistics ==
As of match played 4 November 2026

Appearances and goals by club, season and competition
Club	Season	League			National cup (Note: Includes DFB-Pokal, Coppa Italia)		Europe		Other		Total	
Club	Season	Division	Apps	Goals	Apps	Goals	Apps	Goals	Apps	Goals	Apps	Goals
Eintracht Frankfurt	2012–13	Bundesliga	2	0	0	0	—		—		2	0
Eintracht Frankfurt	2013–14	Bundesliga	3	0	0	0	1 (Note: Appearance in UEFA Europa League)	0	—		4	0
Eintracht Frankfurt	Total		5	0	0	0	1	0	—		6	0
Eintracht Frankfurt II	2013–14	Regionalliga Südwest	18	3	—		—		—		18	3
SC Freiburg	2014–15	Bundesliga	13	2	2	0	—		—		15	2
SC Freiburg	2015–16	2. Bundesliga	30	5	1	0	—		—		31	5
SC Freiburg	2016–17	Bundesliga	13	0	0	0	—		—		13	0
SC Freiburg	2017–18	Bundesliga	12	0	1	0	1	0	—		14	0
SC Freiburg	Total		68	7	4	0	1	0	—		73	7
SC Freiburg II	2014–15	Regionalliga Südwest	9	0	—		—		—		9	0
SC Freiburg II	2016–17	Oberliga Baden-Württemberg	1	0	—		—		—		1	0
SC Freiburg II	Total		10	0	—		—		—		10	0
VfB Stuttgart	2018–19	Bundesliga	23	2	0	0	—		1 (Note: Appearance(s) in Bundesliga relegation play-offs)	0	24	2
VfB Stuttgart	2019–20	2. Bundesliga	21	2	2	0	—		1	0	24	2
VfB Stuttgart	2020–21	Bundesliga	32	2	2	0	—		—		34	2
VfB Stuttgart	2021–22	Bundesliga	12	3	2	0	—		—		14	3
VfB Stuttgart	Total		88	9	6	0	—		2	0	96	6
Hertha BSC	2021–22	Bundesliga	12	0	0	0	—		2	0	14	0
Hertha BSC	2022–23	Bundesliga	31	1	1	0	—		—		32	1
Hertha BSC	2023–24	2. Bundesliga	23	4	2	0	—		—		25	4
Hertha BSC	2024–25	2. Bundesliga	3	0	1	0	—		—		4	0
Hertha BSC	Total		69	5	4	0	—		2	0	75	5
Como	2024–25	Serie A	31	0	0	0	—		—		31	0
Como	2025–26	Serie A	34	4	3	0	—		—		37	4
Como	2026–27	Serie A	7	0	0	0	3	1	—		10	1
Como	Total		72	4	3	0	3	1	—		78	5
Career total			320	28	17	0	5	1	4	0	346	29

== Honours ==
Germany U19

- UEFA European Under-19 Championship: 2014

Germany U21

- UEFA European Under-21 Championship: 2017
