= 2019–20 VfL Wolfsburg season =

VfL Wolfsburg
2019–20 season
- Executive Director: Frank Witter
- Head coach: Oliver Glasner
- Stadium: Volkswagen Arena
- Bundesliga: 7th
- DFB-Pokal: Second round
- UEFA Europa League: Round of 16
- Top goalscorer: League: Wout Weghorst (16); All: Wout Weghorst (20)
- Highest home attendance: 27,195 (vs RB Leipzig, 7 March 2020)
- Lowest home attendance: 21,058 (vs Mainz 05, 23 February 2020)
- Biggest win: VfL Wolfsburg 4–0 Mainz 05
- Biggest defeat: VfL Wolfsburg 1–6 RB Leipzig
Home colours	Away colours	Third colours

The 2019–20 season was VfL Wolfsburg's 75th season in existence and the club's 23rd consecutive season in the top flight of German football. In addition to the domestic league, VfL Wolfsburg participated in this season's edition of the DFB-Pokal, and also participated in the UEFA Europa League. The season was slated to cover a period from 1 July 2019 to 30 June 2020. It was extended extraordinarily beyond 30 June due to the COVID-19 pandemic in Germany.

== Players ==
=== Current squad ===
As of 11 February 2020

Note: Flags indicate national team as defined under FIFA eligibility rules; some limited exceptions apply. Players may hold more than one non-FIFA nationality.

No.	Pos.	Nation	Player
1	GK	BEL	Koen Casteels (vice-captain)
2	DF	BRA	William
4	MF	ESP	Ignacio Camacho
6	DF	BRA	Paulo Otávio
7	MF	CRO	Josip Brekalo
8	MF	SUI	Renato Steffen
9	FW	NED	Wout Weghorst
11	MF	GER	Felix Klaus
12	GK	AUT	Pavao Pervan
13	MF	GER	Yannick Gerhardt
14	FW	SUI	Admir Mehmedi
15	DF	FRA	Jérôme Roussillon
19	DF	SUI	Kevin Mbabu

No.	Pos.	Nation	Player
22	DF	CRO	Marin Pongračić
23	MF	FRA	Josuha Guilavogui (captain)
24	MF	AUT	Xaver Schlager
25	DF	USA	John Brooks
27	MF	GER	Maximilian Arnold (3rd captain)
30	GK	GER	Niklas Klinger
31	DF	GER	Robin Knoche
32	DF	COD	Marcel Tisserand
33	FW	GER	Daniel Ginczek
36	GK	GER	Phillip Menzel
38	MF	BEL	Ismail Azzaoui
40	FW	BRA	João Victor

=== Players out on loan ===
Note: Flags indicate national team as defined under FIFA eligibility rules; some limited exceptions apply. Players may hold more than one non-FIFA nationality.

No.	Pos.	Nation	Player
5	DF	NED	Jeffrey Bruma (at Mainz 05 until 30 June 2020)
10	MF	TUR	Yunus Mallı (at Union Berlin until 30 June 2020)
17	DF	GER	Felix Uduokhai (at FC Augsburg until 30 June 2020)

No.	Pos.	Nation	Player
29	MF	GER	John Yeboah (at VVV-Venlo until 30 June 2020)
34	MF	GER	Marvin Stefaniak (at Greuther Fürth until 30 June 2021)
37	MF	GER	Elvis Rexhbeçaj (at FC Köln until 30 June 2021)

== Transfers ==
=== Transfers in ===
#	Position	Player	Transferred from	Fee	Date	Source
19	DF	(Switzerland) Kevin Mbabu	(Switzerland) Young Boys	€9,200,000	25 April 2019	
40	FW	(Brazil) João Victor	(Austria) LASK Linz	€3,500,000	10 May 2019	
6	DF	(Brazil) Paulo Otávio	(Germany) FC Ingolstadt	€1,100,000	11 June 2019	
24	MF	(Austria) Xaver Schlager	(Austria) Red Bull Salzburg	€15,000,000	26 June 2019	
22	DF	(Croatia) Marin Pongračić	(Austria) Red Bull Salzburg	€10,000,000	15 January 2020	

==== Loans in ====
#	Position	Player	Loaned from	Date	Loan expires	Source
22	FW	(Germany) Lukas Nmecha	(England) Manchester City	3 August 2019	2 January 2020	

=== Transfers out ===
#	Position	Player	Transferred to	Fee	Date	Source
30	MF	(Germany) Paul Seguin	(Germany) SpVgg Greuther Fürth	€300,000	7 May 2019	
35	DF	(Germany) Gian-Luca Itter	(Germany) SC Freiburg	€2,500,000	27 May 2019	
3	DF	(Netherlands) Paul Verhaegh	(Netherlands) FC Twente	Free	5 June 2019	
24	DF	(Germany) Sebastian Jung	(Germany) Hannover 96	Free	23 June 2019	
9	FW	(Belgium) Landry Dimata	(Belgium) Anderlecht	€5,000,000	1 July 2019	
18	FW	(Nigeria) Victor Osimhen	(Belgium) Charleroi	€3,500,000	1 July 2019	
6	MF	(Netherlands) Riechedly Bazoer	(Netherlands) Vitesse	Undisclosed	12 July 2019	
21	MF	(Cameroon) Paul-Georges Ntep	Free agent	Free	11 February 2020	

==== Loans out ====
#	Position	Player	Loaned to	Date	Loan expires	Source
34	MF	(Germany) Marvin Stefaniak	(Germany) Greuther Fürth	1 July 2019	30 June 2021	
21	FW	(Cameroon) Paul-Georges Ntep	(Turkey) Kayserispor	25 August 2019	30 June 2020	
17	DF	(Germany) Felix Uduokhai	(Germany) FC Augsburg	28 August 2019	30 June 2020	
29	MF	(Germany) John Yeboah	(Netherlands) VVV-Venlo	2 September 2019	30 June 2020	
37	MF	(Germany) Elvis Rexhbeçaj	(Germany) 1. FC Köln	6 January 2020	30 June 2021	
10	MF	(Turkey) Yunus Mallı	(Germany) Union Berlin	17 January 2020	30 June 2020	
5	DF	(Netherlands) Jeffrey Bruma	(Germany) Mainz 05	29 January 2020	30 June 2020	

== Pre-season and friendlies ==
Win Draw Loss

6 July 2019 Friendly	VfL Wolfsburg	2–1	Hansa Rostock	Wolfsburg, Germany
16:00 CEST (UTC+2)				Stadium: AOK Stadion

9 July 2019 Friendly	VfL Wolfsburg	2–1	Caen	Wolfsburg, Germany
15:30 CEST (UTC+2)				Stadium: AOK Stadion

13 July 2019 Friendly	VfL Wolfsburg	2–2	VVV-Venlo	Gifhorn, Germany
15:30 CEST (UTC+2)				Stadium: GWG-Stadion A-Platz

17 July 2019 Friendly	PSV	0–2	VfL Wolfsburg	Eindhoven, Netherlands
19:05 CEST (UTC+2)			Arnold 5'; William 40'; Guilavogui (yellow card) 42'; Edwards (yellow card) 64' (yellow-red card) 90'; Schlager (yellow card) 82'	Stadium: Philips Stadion

22 July 2019 Friendly	Fenerbahçe	1–1	VfL Wolfsburg	Kapfenberg, Austria
18:30 CEST (UTC+2)	Muriqi 25'; Aziz (yellow card) 35'; Kadıoğlu (yellow card) 87'	Report	Mbabu (yellow card) 35'; Bruma (yellow card) 57'; Weghorst 63'	Stadium: Franz Fekete Stadium; Attendance: 1,450

27 July 2019 Friendly	VfL Wolfsburg	1–1	Union Berlin	Anif, Austria
15:00 CEST (UTC+2)	Victor 78'	Report	Andersson 2'	Stadium: Maximarkt Sportpark; Attendance: 300; Referee: Andreas Winkler

3 August 2019 Friendly	VfL Wolfsburg	8–1	Nice	Wolfsburg, Germany
15:00 CEST (UTC+2)	Klaus 7'; Weghorst 30'; Gerhardt 75', 85'; Brekalo 78'; Uduokhai 97'; Steffen 107' (pen.); Bruma 117'	Report	Dante 14'	Stadium: AOK Stadion; Attendance: 3,508; Referee: Johan Pfeifer

5 September 2019 Friendly	VfL Wolfsburg	1–1	Hamburger SV	Wolfsburg, Germany
18:00 CEST (UTC+2)	Tisserand 60'	Report	Harnik 88'	Stadium: AOK Stadion; Attendance: 2,189; Referee: Robert Schröder

10 January 2020 Friendly	VfL Wolfsburg	1–1	FC Seoul	Albufeira, Portugal
13:00 WET (UTC±0)	Mallı 14'	Report	Kim Min-soo 61'	Stadium: Estádio Municipal de Albufeira

10 January 2020 Friendly	Servette	2–1	VfL Wolfsburg	Albufeira, Portugal
16:00 WET (UTC±0)	Kyei 50' (pen.), 90'	Report	Ginczek 64'	Stadium: Estádio Municipal de Albufeira

30 July 2020 Friendly	RB Leipzig	1–1	VfL Wolfsburg	Leipzig, Germany
16:00 CEST (UTC+2)	Schick 73' (pen.)	Report	Steffen 71' (pen.)	Stadium: Trainingszentrum RB Leipzig Platz 3 Attendance: 0 Referee: Felix Zwayer

== Competitions ==
=== Overview ===
Competition	First match	Last match	Starting round	Final position	Record							
Competition	First match	Last match	Starting round	Final position	Pld	W	D	L	GF	GA	GD	Win %
Bundesliga	17 August 2019	27 June 2020	Matchday 1	7th	34	13	10	11	48	46	+2	38.24
DFB-Pokal	12 August 2019	30 October 2019	First round	Second round	2	1	0	1	6	9	−3	50.00
Europa League	19 September 2019	5 August 2020	Group stage	Round of 16	10	5	2	3	15	13	+2	50.00
Total					46	19	12	15	69	68	+1	41.30

Last updated: 5 August 2020
Source: Soccerway

=== Bundesliga ===
==== League table ====
Pos	Team	Pld	W	D	L	GF	GA	GD	Pts	Qualification or relegation
5	Bayer Leverkusen	34	19	6	9	61	44	+17	63	Qualification for the Europa League group stage (Note: Since the winners of the 2019–20 DFB-Pokal, Bayern Munich, qualified for the Champions League based on league position, the Europa League group stage spot was passed to the sixth-placed team, and the Europa League second qualifying round spot was passed to the seventh-placed team.)
6	1899 Hoffenheim	34	15	7	12	53	53	0	52	Qualification for the Europa League group stage
7	VfL Wolfsburg	34	13	10	11	48	46	+2	49	Qualification for the Europa League second qualifying round
8	SC Freiburg	34	13	9	12	48	47	+1	48	
9	Eintracht Frankfurt	34	13	6	15	59	60	−1	45	

Source: DFB
Rules for classification: 1) Points; 2) Goal difference; 3) Goals scored; 4) Head-to-head results; 5) Head-to-head away goals scored; 6) Away goals scored; 7) Play-off.

==== Results summary ====
Overall								Home						Away					
Pld	W	D	L	GF	GA	GD	Pts	W	D	L	GF	GA	GD	W	D	L	GF	GA	GD
34	13	10	11	48	46	+2	49	4	7	6	19	23	−4	9	3	5	29	23	+6

Last updated: 27 June 2020.
Source: Bundesliga

==== Results by round ====
Round	1	2	3	4	5	6	7	8	9	10	11	12	13	14	15	16	17	18	19	20	21	22	23	24	25	26	27	28	29	30	31	32	33	34
Ground	H	A	H	A	H	A	H	A	H	A	H	A	H	A	H	H	A	A	H	A	H	A	H	A	H	A	H	A	H	A	H	A	A	H
Result	W	W	D	D	D	W	W	D	D	L	L	W	L	L	W	D	L	L	L	W	D	W	W	D	D	W	L	W	L	W	D	L	W	L
Position	6	4	3	5	8	7	2	2	4	8	10	7	9	9	8	8	9	9	10	9	10	9	7	7	7	6	6	6	6	6	6	6	6	7

Updated to match(es) played on 27 June 2020. Source: Bundesliga
A = Away; H = Home; W = Win; D = Draw; L = Loss

==== Matches ====
The Bundesliga schedule was announced on 28 June 2019.

17 August 2019 1	VfL Wolfsburg	2–1	1. FC Köln	Wolfsburg
15:30 CEST (UTC+2)	Arnold 16'; Weghorst 60'; Steffen (yellow card) 75'	Report	Terodde 90+1'; Meré (yellow card) 90+2'	Stadium: Volkswagen Arena; Attendance: 25,099; Referee: Sven Jablonski

25 August 2019 2	Hertha BSC	0–3	VfL Wolfsburg	Berlin
18:00 CEST (UTC+2)	Duda (yellow card) 36'	Report	Weghorst 9' (pen.); Brekalo 82'; Roussillon 90+1'	Stadium: Olympiastadion; Attendance: 42,738; Referee: Guido Winkmann

31 August 2019 3	VfL Wolfsburg	1–1	SC Paderborn	Wolfsburg
15:30 CEST (UTC+2)	Brekalo 56'	Report	Cauly 12'; Hünemeier (yellow card) 63'; Holtmann (yellow card) 88'; Ggasula (yellow card) 90+6'	Stadium: Volkswagen Arena; Attendance: 23,750; Referee: Daniel Schlager

13 September 2019 4	Fortuna Düsseldorf	1–1	VfL Wolfsburg	Düsseldorf
20:30 CEST (UTC+2)	Gießelmann 16'	Report	Weghorst 29', (yellow card) 33'; Knoche (yellow card) 40'	Stadium: Merkur Spiel-Arena; Attendance: 36,758; Referee: Manuel Gräfe

23 September 2019 5	VfL Wolfsburg	1–1	1899 Hoffenheim	Wolfsburg
20:30 CEST (UTC+2)	Mehmedi 36'; Gerhardt (yellow card) 64'; Arnold (yellow card) 76'	Report	Rudy 6'; Posch (yellow card) 14'; Geiger (yellow card) 62'; Akpoguma (yellow card) 90'; Adamyan (yellow card) 90+1'	Stadium: Volkswagen Arena; Attendance: 21,120; Referee: Benjamin Cortus

28 September 2019 6	Mainz 05	0–1	VfL Wolfsburg	Mainz
15:30 CEST (UTC+2)	Niakhaté (yellow card) 39'; Maxim (yellow card) 86'	Report	Tisserand 9', (yellow card) 37'; Knoche (yellow card) 61'; Weghorst (yellow card) 65'	Stadium: Opel Arena; Attendance: 24,303; Referee: Felix Brych

6 October 2019 7	VfL Wolfsburg	1–0	Union Berlin	Wolfsburg
15:30 CEST (UTC+2)	Guilavogui (yellow card) 32'; Bruma (yellow card) 37'; Weghorst 69'	Report	Andrich (yellow card) 26'; Friedrich (yellow card) 65'	Stadium: Volkswagen Arena; Attendance: 27,012; Referee: Bastian Dankert

19 October 2019 8	RB Leipzig	1–1	VfL Wolfsburg	Leipzig
15:30 CEST (UTC+2)	Werner 54'; Saracchi (yellow card) 69'	Report	Guilavogui (yellow card) 7'; Mbabu (yellow card) 12'; Tisserand (yellow card) 45'; Weghorst 82'	Stadium: Red Bull Arena; Attendance: 39,182; Referee: Deniz Aytekin

27 October 2019 9	VfL Wolfsburg	0–0	FC Augsburg	Wolfsburg
15:30 CET (UTC+1)		Report		Stadium: Volkswagen Arena; Attendance: 22,630; Referee: Tobias Stieler

2 November 2019 10	Borussia Dortmund	3–0	VfL Wolfsburg	Dortmund
15:30 CET (UTC+1)	Weigl (yellow card) 44'; Hazard 52'; Guerreiro 58'; Götze 88' (pen.)	Report	Nmecha (yellow card) 40'; Brooks (yellow card) 45+2'; Tisserand (yellow card) 69'	Stadium: Signal Iduna Park; Attendance: 80,200; Referee: Tobias Welz

10 November 2019 11	VfL Wolfsburg	0–2	Bayer Leverkusen	Wolfsburg
15:30 CET (UTC+1)	João Victor (yellow card) 45+1'; Tisserand (yellow card) 83'	Report	Bellarabi 25'; Volland (yellow card) 27'; Hrádecký (yellow card) 90+2'; Paulinho 90+6'	Stadium: Volkswagen Arena; Attendance: 24,112; Referee: Manuel Gräfe

23 November 2019 12	Eintracht Frankfurt	0–2	VfL Wolfsburg	Frankfurt
15:30 CET (UTC+1)	Sow (yellow card) 40'; Hinteregger (yellow card) 70'; Kostić (yellow card) 86'	Report	Arnold (yellow card) 14'; Weghorst 19'; Tisserand (yellow card) 39' (yellow-red card) 45+1'; João Victor 65'; Guilavogui (yellow card) 67'; Steffen (yellow card) 89'	Stadium: Commerzbank-Arena; Attendance: 50,700; Referee: Daniel Siebert

1 December 2019 13	VfL Wolfsburg	2–3	Werder Bremen	Wolfsburg
18:00 CET (UTC+1)	Weghorst 36'; William 73'; Arnold (yellow card) 90+2'	Report	Rashica 13' (pen.), 83', (yellow card) 81'; Bittencourt 39'; Groß (yellow card) 61'; Osako (yellow card) 68'; Veljković (yellow card) 90+5'	Stadium: Volkswagen Arena; Attendance: 26,012; Referee: Robert Kampka

7 December 2019 14	SC Freiburg	1–0	VfL Wolfsburg	Freiburg
15:30 CET (UTC+1)	Schmid 85'	Report	João Victor (yellow card) 21'; Tisserand (yellow card) 88'	Stadium: Schwarzwald-Stadion; Attendance: 23,800; Referee: Bastian Dankert

15 December 2019 15	VfL Wolfsburg	2–1	Borussia Mönchengladbach	Wolfsburg
15:30 CET (UTC+1)	Schlager 13', (yellow card) 71'; Brooks (yellow card) 20'; Roussillon (yellow card) 45+1'; Arnold 90+1'	Report	Embolo 15', (yellow card) 34'; Strobl (yellow card) 51'; Beyer (yellow card) 72'	Stadium: Volkswagen Arena; Attendance: 25,580; Referee: Felix Brych

18 December 2019 16	VfL Wolfsburg	1–1	Schalke 04	Wolfsburg
20:30 CET (UTC+1)	Tisserand (yellow card) 60'; Mbabu 82'	Report	Kabak 51'; Burgstaller (yellow card) 90+3'	Stadium: Volkswagen Arena; Attendance: 24,651; Referee: Martin Petersen

21 December 2019 17	Bayern Munich	2–0	VfL Wolfsburg	Munich
15:30 CET (UTC+1)	Kimmich (yellow card) 47'; Müller (yellow card) 76'; Zirkzee 86'; Gnabry 89'	Report	Otávio (yellow card) 67'; Arnold (yellow card) 71'	Stadium: Allianz Arena; Attendance: 75,000; Referee: Christian Dingert

18 January 2020 18	1. FC Köln	3–1	VfL Wolfsburg	Cologne
15:30 CET (UTC+1)	Córdoba 22', 45+2'; Hector 62', (yellow card) 81'; Thielmann (yellow card) 66'; Jakobs (yellow card) 86'	Report	Brooks (yellow card) 19'; Guilavogui (yellow card) 25'; Steffen 66'; Weghorst (yellow card) 89'	Stadium: RheinEnergieStadion; Attendance: 49,100; Referee: Marco Fritz

25 January 2020 19	VfL Wolfsburg	1–2	Hertha BSC	Wolfsburg
15:30 CET (UTC+1)	Mehmedi 68'	Report	Torunarigha (yellow card) 37', (goal) 74'; Lukebakio 90'	Stadium: Volkswagen Arena; Attendance: 24,894; Referee: Markus Schmidt

2 February 2020 20	SC Paderborn	2–4	VfL Wolfsburg	Paderborn
18:00 CET (UTC+1)	Zolinski 22'; Holtmann (red card) 33'; Strohdiek (yellow card) 64'; Vasiliadis 72', (yellow card) 80'; Hünemeier (yellow card) 75'	Report	Guilavogui (yellow card) 10'; Knoche 26'; Steffen (yellow card) 33'; Ginczek 40', 60'; Pongračić (yellow card) 57'; Arnold 76'	Stadium: Benteler-Arena; Attendance: 13,926; Referee: Patrick Ittrich

8 February 2020 21	VfL Wolfsburg	1–1	Fortuna Düsseldorf	Wolfsburg
15:30 CET (UTC+1)	Pongračić (red card) 48'; Steffen 50'	Report	Zimmermann 13'; Hoffmann (yellow card) 79'	Stadium: Volkswagen Arena; Attendance: 23,445; Referee: Tobias Stieler

15 February 2020 22	1899 Hoffenheim	2–3	VfL Wolfsburg	Sinsheim
15:30 CET (UTC+1)	Rudy (yellow card) 17'; Baumgartner 45'; Hübner (yellow card) 51'; Kramarić 60' (pen.)	Report	Arnold (yellow card) 7'; Weghorst 18' (pen.), 52' (pen.), 71', (yellow card) 59'	Stadium: PreZero Arena; Attendance: 22,506; Referee: Sören Storks

23 February 2020 23	VfL Wolfsburg	4–0	Mainz 05	Wolfsburg
18:00 CET (UTC+1)	Brekalo 21'; Steffen 45', 68'; Gerhardt 49'	Report	Barreiro (yellow card) 31'; Pierre-Gabriel (yellow card) 65'	Stadium: Volkswagen Arena; Attendance: 21,058; Referee: Benjamin Cortus

1 March 2020 24	Union Berlin	2–2	VfL Wolfsburg	Berlin
15:30 CET (UTC+1)	Andersson 41'; Andrich (yellow card) 53'; Friedrich 56'	Report	Arnold (yellow card) 40'; Gerhardt 60'; Steffen (yellow card) 61'; Weghorst 81'	Stadium: Stadion An der Alten Försterei; Attendance: 22,012; Referee: Bastian Dankert

7 March 2020 25	VfL Wolfsburg	0–0	RB Leipzig	Wolfsburg
15:30 CET (UTC+1)	Otávio (yellow card) 64'; Weghorst (yellow card) 78'	Report	Laimer (yellow card) 41'; Upamecano (yellow card) 57'; Olmo (yellow card) 90'	Stadium: Volkswagen Arena; Attendance: 27,195; Referee: Daniel Schlager

16 May 2020 26	FC Augsburg	1–2	VfL Wolfsburg	Augsburg
15:30 CEST (UTC+2)	Suchý (yellow card) 39'; Jedvaj 54'	Report	Steffen 43'; Otávio (yellow card) 53'; Arnold (yellow card) 73'; Ginczek 90+1'; Roussillon (yellow card) 90+3'	Stadium: WWK Arena; Attendance: 0 Referee: Felix Brych
Note: The match was postponed on 13 March due to the pandemic of COVID-19 in Germany, and rescheduled to 16 May.

23 May 2020 27	VfL Wolfsburg	0–2	Borussia Dortmund	Wolfsburg
15:30 CEST (UTC+2)	Ginczek (yellow card) 61'; Brooks (yellow card) 66'; Klaus (red card) 82'; Arnold (yellow card) 86'; Schlager (yellow card) 90+2'	Report	Guerreiro 32'; Delaney (yellow card) 55'; Hazard (yellow card) 74'; Hakimi 78'	Stadium: Volkswagen Arena; Attendance: 0 Referee: Daniel Siebert
Note: The match was postponed on 13 March due to the pandemic of COVID-19 in Germany, and rescheduled to 23 May.

26 May 2020 28	Bayer Leverkusen	1–4	VfL Wolfsburg	Leverkusen
20:30 CEST (UTC+2)	Demirbay (yellow card) 29'; Baumgartlinger (yellow card) 63', (goal) 86'; Diaby (yellow card) 67'	Report	João Victor (yellow card) 32'; Pongračić 43', 75'; Arnold 64'; Ginczek (yellow card) 67'; Steffen 68'; Casteels (yellow card) 71'	Stadium: BayArena; Attendance: 0 Referee: Daniel Schlager
Note: The match was postponed on 24 March due to the pandemic of COVID-19 in Germany, and rescheduled to 26 May.

30 May 2020 29	VfL Wolfsburg	1–2	Eintracht Frankfurt	Wolfsburg
15:30 CEST (UTC+2)	João Victor (yellow card) 8'; Pongračić (yellow card) 26'; Mbabu 58'; Steffen (yellow card) 90+2'; Roussillon (yellow card) 90+5'	Report	Silva 27' (pen.); Kamada (yellow card) 35', (goal) 85'; Gaćinović (yellow card) 67'; Rode (yellow card) 69'; Torró (yellow card) 90+1' (yellow-red card) 90+5'; De Guzmán (yellow card) 90+5'	Stadium: Volkswagen Arena; Attendance: 0 Referee: Guido Winkmann
Note: The match was postponed on 24 March due to the pandemic of COVID-19 in Germany, and rescheduled to 30 May.

7 June 2020 30	Werder Bremen	0–1	VfL Wolfsburg	Bremen
13:30 CEST (UTC+2)	Klaassen (yellow card) 45'; Sargent (yellow card) 49'; Bittencourt (yellow card) 80'	Report	Schlager (yellow card) 54'; Pongračić (yellow card) 58'; Mbabu (yellow card) 67'; Weghorst 82'	Stadium: Weser-Stadion; Attendance: 0 Referee: Bibiana Steinhaus
Note: The match was postponed on 24 March due to the pandemic of COVID-19 in Germany, and rescheduled to 7 June.

13 June 2020 31	VfL Wolfsburg	2–2	SC Freiburg	Wolfsburg
15:30 CEST (UTC+2)	Weghorst 14', 27' (pen.)	Report	Höfler (yellow card) 23'; Höler 43'; Sallai 46'	Stadium: Volkswagen Arena; Attendance: 0 Referee: Bastian Dankert
Note: The match was postponed on 24 March due to the pandemic of COVID-19 in Germany, and rescheduled to 13 June.

16 June 2020 32	Borussia Mönchengladbach	3–0	VfL Wolfsburg	Mönchengladbach
18:30 CEST (UTC+2)	Hofmann 11', 30'; Stindl 65'; Elvedi (yellow card) 73'	Report	Pongračić (yellow card) 29'; Weghorst (yellow card) 63'; Mbabu (yellow card) 82'; Guilavogui (yellow card) 85'	Stadium: Borussia-Park; Attendance: 0 Referee: Robert Schröder
Note: The match was postponed on 24 March due to the pandemic of COVID-19 in Germany, and rescheduled to 16 June.

20 June 2020 33	Schalke 04	1–4	VfL Wolfsburg	Gelsenkirchen
15:30 CEST (UTC+2)	Oczipka (yellow card) 30'; Gregoritsch (yellow card) 35'; Kenny (yellow card) 38'; McKennie (yellow card) 58'; Matondo 70'	Report	Steffen (yellow card) 11'; Weghorst 16', 56'; Mbabu 59', (yellow card) 81'; João Victor 69'; Roussillon (yellow card) 87'	Stadium: Veltins-Arena; Attendance: 0 Referee: Sascha Stegemann
Note: The match was postponed on 24 March due to the pandemic of COVID-19 in Germany, and rescheduled to 20 June.

27 June 2020 34	VfL Wolfsburg	0–4	Bayern Munich	Wolfsburg
15:30 CEST (UTC+2)	Weghorst (yellow card) 15'; Guilavogui (yellow card) 66' (yellow-red card) 71'	Report	Coman 4'; Cuisance 37'; Lewandowski 72' (pen.); Müller 79'	Stadium: Volkswagen Arena; Attendance: 0 Referee: Patrick Ittrich
Note: The match was postponed on 7 May due to the pandemic of COVID-19 in Germany, and rescheduled to 27 June.

=== DFB-Pokal ===
12 August 2019 First round	Hallescher FC	3–5 (a.e.t.)	VfL Wolfsburg	Halle
18:30 CEST (UTC+2)	Kastenhofer (yellow card) 21'; Drinkuth 43'; Mai 57', (yellow card) 118'; Fetsch 90+2'; Landgraf (yellow card) 108'	Report	Weghorst 44'; Brooks (yellow card) 45'; Gerhardt 49'; Guilavogui (yellow card) 64' (yellow-red card) 89'; William 70'; William (yellow card) 90'; Knoche 92'; Brekalo 94'	Stadium: Erdgas Sportpark; Attendance: 13,500; Referee: Markus Schmidt

30 October 2019 Second round	VfL Wolfsburg	1–6	RB Leipzig	Wolfsburg
18:30 CET (UTC+1)	Mbabu (yellow card) 7'; Arnold (yellow card) 42'; Weghorst (yellow card) 59', (goal) 89'	Report	Pervan 13' (o.g.); Mukiele (yellow card) 35'; Sabitzer 55'; Forsberg 58'; Laimer 61'; Werner 68', 88'; Ampadu (yellow card) 84'	Stadium: Volkswagen Arena; Attendance: 17,705; Referee: Felix Zwayer

=== UEFA Europa League ===
==== Group stage ====
Pos	Team	Pld	W	D	L	GF	GA	GD	Pts	Qualification	GNT	WLF	STE	OLE
1	(Belgium) Gent	6	3	3	0	11	7	+4	12	Advance to knockout phase	—	2–2	3–2	2–1
2	(Germany) VfL Wolfsburg	6	3	2	1	9	7	+2	11	Advance to knockout phase	1–3	—	1–0	3–1
3	(France) Saint-Étienne	6	0	4	2	6	8	−2	4		0–0	1–1	—	1–1
4	(Ukraine) Oleksandriya	6	0	3	3	6	10	−4	3		1–1	0–1	2–2	—

Source: UEFA
Rules for classification: Group stage tiebreakers

19 September 2019 1	VfL Wolfsburg (Germany)	3–1	(Ukraine) Oleksandriya	Wolfsburg, Germany
21:00 CEST (UTC+2)	Arnold 20'; Mehmedi 24'; Brekalo 67'	Report	Banada 66', (yellow card) 81'; Dubra (yellow card) 89'	Stadium: Volkswagen Arena; Attendance: 10,112; Referee: Halis Özkahya (Turkey)

3 October 2019 2	Saint-Étienne (France)	1–1	(Germany) VfL Wolfsburg	Saint-Étienne, France
18:55 CEST (UTC+2)	Kolodziejczak 13'; Berić (yellow card) 40'	Report	William 15'; Arnold (yellow card) 50'; Bruma (yellow card) 84'	Stadium: Stade Geoffroy-Guichard; Attendance: 24,815; Referee: Craig Pawson (England)

24 October 2019 3	Gent (Belgium)	2–2	(Germany) VfL Wolfsburg	Ghent, Belgium
18:55 CEST (UTC+2)	Owusu (yellow card) 17'; Odjidja-Ofoe (yellow card) 28'; Asare (yellow card) 37'; Yaremchuk 41', 90+4'; Ngadeu-Ngadjui (yellow card) 54'	Report	Weghorst 3', (yellow card) 19'; João Victor 24'; William (yellow card) 33'; Mbabu (yellow card) 57'	Stadium: Ghelamco Arena; Attendance: 15,437; Referee: Sergey Ivanov (Russia)

7 November 2019 4	VfL Wolfsburg (Germany)	1–3	(Belgium) Gent	Wolfsburg, Germany
21:00 CET (UTC+1)	João Victor 20'; Arnold (yellow card) 45'; Knoche (yellow card) 75'; Steffen (yellow card) 85'	Report	Asare (yellow card) 45+2'; Plastun (yellow card) 46'; Yaremchuk 50'; Depoitre 65'; Ngadeu-Ngadjui 76'	Stadium: Volkswagen Arena; Attendance: 12,000; Referee: Massimiliano Irrati (Italy)

28 November 2019 5	Oleksandriya (Ukraine)	0–1	(Germany) VfL Wolfsburg	Lviv, Ukraine
19:55 EET (UTC+2)	Pashayev (yellow card) 45'; Bezborodko (yellow card) 71'	Report	Bruma (yellow card) 19'; Weghorst 45+1' (pen.); Roussillon (yellow card) 69'; William (yellow card) 88'	Stadium: Arena Lviv; Attendance: 7,118; Referee: Manuel Schüttengruber (Austria)

12 December 2019 6	VfL Wolfsburg (Germany)	1–0	(France) Saint-Étienne	Wolfsburg, Germany
21:00 CET (UTC+1)	Mbabu (yellow card) 24'; Otávio 52'; Steffen (yellow card) 90+4'	Report	Berić (yellow card) 21'; Kolodziejczak (yellow card) 78'	Stadium: Volkswagen Arena; Attendance: 10,802; Referee: Paul Tierney (England)

==== Knockout phase ====
===== Round of 32 =====
20 February 2020 First leg	VfL Wolfsburg (Germany)	2–1	(Sweden) Malmö FF	Wolfsburg, Germany
21:00 CET (UTC+1)	Gerhardt (yellow card) 43'; Mbabu (yellow card) 46'; Brekalo 49'; Thelin 62' (o.g.)	Report	Safari (yellow card) 41'; Thelin 47' (pen.); Nalić (yellow card) 70'	Stadium: Volkswagen Arena; Attendance: 13,801; Referee: Gediminas Mažeika (Lithuania)

27 February 2020 Second leg	Malmö FF (Sweden)	0–3 (1–5 agg.)	(Germany) VfL Wolfsburg	Malmö, Sweden
18:55 CET (UTC+1)	Rieks (yellow card) 5'	Report	Brekalo 42'; Gerhardt 65'; João Victor 69'; Brooks (yellow card) 84'	Stadium: Stadion; Attendance: 20,500; Referee: Willie Collum (Scotland)

===== Round of 16 =====
12 March 2020 First leg	VfL Wolfsburg (Germany)	1–2	(Ukraine) Shakhtar Donetsk	Wolfsburg, Germany
21:00 CET (UTC+1)	Weghorst (yellow card) 18'; Brooks 48', (yellow card) 71'; Steffen (yellow card) 56'	Report	Moraes 17'; Marcos Antônio 73'	Stadium: Volkswagen Arena; Attendance: 0 Referee: Damir Skomina (Slovenia)

5 August 2020 Second leg	Shakhtar Donetsk (Ukraine)	3–0 (5–1 agg.)	(Germany) VfL Wolfsburg	Kyiv, Ukraine
18:55 CEST (UTC+2)	Kryvtsov (yellow card) 59'; Khocholava (red card) 68'; Moraes 89', 90+3'; Solomon 90+1'	Report	Brooks (yellow card) 57' (yellow-red card) 70'; Schlager (yellow card) 71'; Arnold (yellow card) 87'	Stadium: NSC Olimpiyskiy Stadium; Attendance: 0 Referee: Ivan Kružliak (Slovakia)
Note: The match originally scheduled to be played on 19 March, was indefinitely postponed due to a pandemic of COVID-19 in Europe. The match was rescheduled on 17 June to 5 August.

== Statistics ==
=== Appearances and goals ===
No.	Pos	Nat	Player	Total		Bundesliga		DFB-Pokal		Europa League	
No.	Pos	Nat	Player	Apps	Goals	Apps	Goals	Apps	Goals	Apps	Goals
Goalkeepers
1	GK	(Belgium) BEL	Koen Casteels	32	0	26	0	1	0	5	0
12	GK	(Austria) AUT	Pavao Pervan	14	0	8	0	1	0	5	0
30	GK	(Germany) GER	Niklas Klinger	0	0	0	0	0	0	0	0
36	GK	(Germany) GER	Phillip Menzel	0	0	0	0	0	0	0	0
Defenders
2	DF	(Brazil) BRA	William	22	3	16	1	2	1	4	1
6	DF	(Brazil) BRA	Paulo Otávio	9	1	4+1	0	0	0	3+1	1
15	DF	(France) FRA	Jérôme Roussillon	37	1	27+2	1	1	0	5+2	0
19	DF	(Switzerland) SUI	Kevin Mbabu	27	3	18+2	3	1+1	0	3+2	0
22	DF	(Croatia) CRO	Marin Pongračić	12	2	11	2	0	0	1	0
25	DF	(United States) USA	John Brooks	31	1	25	0	1	0	5	1
31	DF	(Germany) GER	Robin Knoche	31	2	17+4	1	1+1	1	8	0
32	DF	(Democratic Republic of the Congo) COD	Marcel Tisserand	23	1	14+1	1	1	0	7	0
Midfielders
4	MF	(Spain) ESP	Ignacio Camacho	0	0	0	0	0	0	0	0
8	MF	(Switzerland) SUI	Renato Steffen	38	6	19+8	6	1+1	0	5+4	0
11	MF	(Germany) GER	Felix Klaus	29	0	6+17	0	1	0	1+4	0
13	DF	(Germany) GER	Yannick Gerhardt	25	4	7+11	2	2	1	5	1
20	MF	(Germany) GER	Luca Horn	1	0	0+1	0	0	0	0	0
23	MF	(France) FRA	Josuha Guilavogui	31	0	23+2	0	1	0	4+1	0
24	MF	(Austria) AUT	Xaver Schlager	28	1	21+2	1	0	0	5	0
27	MF	(Germany) GER	Maximilian Arnold	44	5	32+1	4	2	0	9	1
38	MF	(Belgium) BEL	Ismail Azzaoui	0	0	0	0	0	0	0	0
Forwards
7	FW	(Croatia) CRO	Josip Brekalo	41	8	19+11	4	1+1	1	9	3
9	FW	(Netherlands) NED	Wout Weghorst	43	20	30+2	16	2	2	9	2
14	FW	(Switzerland) SUI	Admir Mehmedi	26	3	14+7	2	0	0	5	1
29	FW	(Egypt) EGY	Omar Marmoush	6	0	0+5	0	0	0	0+1	0
33	FW	(Germany) GER	Daniel Ginczek	23	3	9+9	3	0	0	2+3	0
37	FW	(France) FRA	Mamoudou Karamoko	1	0	0+1	0	0	0	0	0
40	FW	(Brazil) BRA	João Victor	41	5	18+14	2	2	0	4+3	3
Players transferred out during the season
3	DF	(Netherlands) NED	Jeffrey Bruma	15	0	9	0	1	0	4+1	0
10	MF	(Turkey) TUR	Yunus Mallı	2	0	0	0	0	0	0+2	0
17	DF	(Germany) GER	Ohis Felix Uduokhai	1	0	0	0	0+1	0	0	0
21	MF	(Cameroon) CMR	Paul-Georges Ntep	0	0	0	0	0	0	0	0
22	FW	(Germany) GER	Lukas Nmecha	12	0	1+5	0	0+1	0	0+5	0
29	MF	(Germany) GER	John Yeboah	0	0	0	0	0	0	0	0
37	MF	(Germany) GER	Elvis Rexhbeçaj	2	0	0	0	0+1	0	1	0

Last updated: 5 August 2020
Source: Competitions
