= 2018–19 VfL Wolfsburg season =

VfL Wolfsburg
2018–19 season
- Owner: Volkswagen
- Executive director: Francisco Javier García Sanz
- Manager: Bruno Labbadia
- Stadium: Volkswagen Arena
- Bundesliga: 6th
- DFB-Pokal: Round of 16
- Top goalscorer: League: Wout Weghorst (17 goals); All: Wout Weghorst (18 goals)
- Highest home attendance: 30,000
- Lowest home attendance: 20,334
- Average home league attendance: 24,481
- Biggest win: Wolfsburg 8–1 Augsburg
- Biggest defeat: Bayern 6–0 Wolfsburg
Home colours	Away colours	Third colours
- All statistics correct as of 25 May 2019.

The 2018–19 VfL Wolfsburg season was the 74th season in the football club's history and 22nd consecutive and overall season in the top flight of German football, the Bundesliga, having been promoted from the 2. Bundesliga in 1997. In addition to the domestic league, VfL Wolfsburg also participated in the season's edition of the domestic cup, the DFB-Pokal. This was the 17th season for Wolfsburg in the Volkswagen Arena, located in Wolfsburg, Lower Saxony, Germany. The season covers a period from 1 July 2018 to 30 June 2019.

== Transfers ==
=== Transfers in ===
#	Position	Player	Transferred from	Fee	Date	Source
9	FW	(Netherlands) Wout Weghorst	(Netherlands) AZ	€10,500,000	26 June 2018	
33	FW	(Germany) Daniel Ginczek	(Germany) VfB Stuttgart	€14,000,000	1 July 2018	
11	MF	(Germany) Felix Klaus	(Germany) Hannover 96	€3,000,000	1 July 2018	
12	GK	(Austria) Pavao Pervan	(Austria) LASK Linz	€500,000	1 July 2018	
32	DF	(Democratic Republic of the Congo) Marcel Tisserand	(Germany) FC Ingolstadt	€7,000,000	1 July 2018	
15	DF	(France) Jérôme Roussillon	(France) Montpellier	€5,000,000	6 August 2018	

==== Loans in ====
#	Position	Player	Loaned from	Date	Loan expires	Source

=== Transfers out ===
#	Position	Player	Transferred to	Fee	Date	Source
11	MF	(Germany) Daniel Didavi	(Germany) VfB Stuttgart	€4,000,000	29 June 2018	
20	GK	(Germany) Max Grün	(Germany) SV Darmstadt 98	Free	1 July 2018	
39	DF	(Germany) Paul Jaeckel	(Germany) Greuther Fürth	€200,000	30 August 2018	
32	FW	(England) Kaylen Hinds	Free Agent	Free	6 September 2018	
16	MF	(Poland) Jakub Błaszczykowski	(Poland) Wisła Kraków	Free	7 February 2019	

==== Loans out ====
#	Position	Player	Loaned to	Date	Loan expires	Source
9	FW	(Belgium) Landry Dimata	(Belgium) Anderlecht	2 July 2018	30 June 2019	
18	FW	(Nigeria) Victor Osimhen	(Belgium) Charleroi	22 August 2018	30 June 2019	
6	MF	(Netherlands) Riechedly Bazoer	(Portugal) FC Porto	31 August 2018	6 January 2019	
6	MF	(Netherlands) Riechedly Bazoer	(Netherlands) FC Utrecht	7 January 2019	30 June 2019	
30	MF	(Germany) Paul Seguin	(Germany) Greuther Fürth	17 January 2019	30 June 2019	
5	DF	(Netherlands) Jeffrey Bruma	(Germany) Schalke 04	31 January 2019	30 June 2019	

== Competitions ==
Win Draw Loss

=== Overview ===
Competition	First match	Last match	Starting round	Final position	Record							
Competition	First match	Last match	Starting round	Final position	Pld	W	D	L	GF	GA	GD	Win %
Bundesliga	25 August 2018	18 May 2019	Matchday 1	6th	34	16	7	11	62	50	+12	47.06
DFB-Pokal	18 August 2018	6 February 2019	First round	Round of 16	3	2	0	1	3	1	+2	66.67
Total					37	18	7	12	65	51	+14	48.65

Last updated: 25 May 2019
Source: Competitions

=== Bundesliga ===
==== League table ====
Pos	Team	Pld	W	D	L	GF	GA	GD	Pts	Qualification or relegation
4	Bayer Leverkusen	34	18	4	12	69	52	+17	58	Qualification for the Champions League group stage
5	Borussia Mönchengladbach	34	16	7	11	55	42	+13	55	Qualification for the Europa League group stage (Note: Since the winners of the 2018–19 DFB-Pokal, Bayern Munich, qualified for the Champions League based on league position, the Europa League group stage spot was passed to the sixth-placed team, and the Europa League second qualifying round spot was passed to the seventh-placed team.)
6	VfL Wolfsburg	34	16	7	11	62	50	+12	55	Qualification for the Europa League group stage
7	Eintracht Frankfurt	34	15	9	10	60	48	+12	54	Qualification for the Europa League second qualifying round
8	Werder Bremen	34	14	11	9	58	49	+9	53	

Source: DFB
Rules for classification: 1) Points; 2) Goal difference; 3) Goals scored; 4) Head-to-head results; 5) Head-to-head away goals scored; 6) Away goals scored; 7) Play-off

==== Results summary ====
Overall								Home						Away					
Pld	W	D	L	GF	GA	GD	Pts	W	D	L	GF	GA	GD	W	D	L	GF	GA	GD
34	16	7	11	62	50	+12	55	8	5	4	36	23	+13	8	2	7	26	27	−1

Last updated: 25 May 2019.
Source: Bundesliga

==== Results by round ====
Round	1	2	3	4	5	6	7	8	9	10	11	12	13	14	15	16	17	18	19	20	21	22	23	24	25	26	27	28	29	30	31	32	33	34
Ground	H	A	H	H	A	H	A	H	A	H	A	H	A	H	A	H	A	A	H	A	A	H	A	H	A	H	A	H	A	H	A	H	A	H
Result	W	W	D	L	D	D	L	L	W	L	L	W	W	D	W	W	W	L	L	W	D	W	W	D	L	W	L	W	L	D	W	W	L	W
Position	5	2	3	5	6	7	9	10	10	11	12	9	8	9	8	6	5	6	8	6	7	6	5	7	7	7	8	6	9	9	8	7	7	6

Updated to match(es) played on 25 May 2019. Source: DFB
A = Away; H = Home; W = Win; D = Draw; L = Loss

==== Matches ====
25 August 2018 1	VfL Wolfsburg	2–1	Schalke 04	Wolfsburg
15:30 CEST (UTC+2)	Brooks 33'; Ginczek 90+4'	Report	Bentaleb 85' (pen.)	Stadium: Volkswagen Arena; Attendance: 26,621; Referee: Patrick Ittrich

1 September 2018 2	Bayer Leverkusen	1–3	VfL Wolfsburg	Leverkusen
15:30 CEST (UTC+2)	Bailey 24'	Report	Özcan 36' (o.g.); Weghorst 55'; Steffen 60'	Stadium: BayArena; Attendance: 26,247; Referee: Sven Jablonski

15 September 2018 3	VfL Wolfsburg	2–2	Hertha BSC	Wolfsburg
15:30 CEST (UTC+2)	Mallı 87' (pen.); Mehmedi 90+3'	Report	Dilrosun 61'; Duda 90+1'	Stadium: Volkswagen Arena; Attendance: 25,090; Referee: Christian Dingert

22 September 2018 4	VfL Wolfsburg	1–3	SC Freiburg	Wolfsburg
15:30 CEST (UTC+2)	Mehmedi 61'	Report	Sallai 7'; Petersen 21'; Frantz 50'	Stadium: Volkswagen Arena; Attendance: 23,011; Referee: Sascha Stegemann

26 September 2018 5	Mainz 05	0–0	VfL Wolfsburg	Mainz
20:30 CEST (UTC+2)		Report		Stadium: Opel Arena; Attendance: 19,205; Referee: Tobias Stieler

29 September 2018 6	VfL Wolfsburg	2–2	Borussia Mönchengladbach	Wolfsburg
15:30 CEST (UTC+2)	Steffen 12'; Weghorst 59'	Report	Pléa 7'; Hazard 48'	Stadium: Volkswagen Arena; Attendance: 24,100; Referee: Felix Zwayer

5 October 2018 7	Werder Bremen	2–0	VfL Wolfsburg	Bremen
20:30 CEST (UTC+2)	Klaassen 35'; J. Eggestein 86'	Report		Stadium: Weser-Stadion; Attendance: 42,100; Referee: Martin Petersen

20 October 2018 8	VfL Wolfsburg	1–3	Bayern Munich	Wolfsburg
15:30 CEST (UTC+2)	Weghorst 63'	Report	Lewandowski 30', 48'; Rodríguez 72'	Stadium: Volkswagen Arena; Attendance: 30,000; Referee: Guido Winkmann

27 October 2018 9	Fortuna Düsseldorf	0–3	VfL Wolfsburg	Düsseldorf
15:30 CEST (UTC+2)		Report	Weghorst 41' (pen.); Brekalo 73'; Ginczek 80'	Stadium: Merkur Spiel-Arena; Attendance: 38,043; Referee: Daniel Schlager

3 November 2018 10	VfL Wolfsburg	0–1	Borussia Dortmund	Wolfsburg
15:30 CET (UTC+1)		Report	Reus 27'	Stadium: Volkswagen Arena; Attendance: 30,000; Referee: Daniel Siebert

9 November 2018 11	Hannover 96	2–1	VfL Wolfsburg	Hanover
20:30 CET (UTC+1)	Maina 31'; Bebou 62' (pen.)	Report	Weghorst 82' (pen.)	Stadium: HDI-Arena; Attendance: 35,800; Referee: Marco Fritz

24 November 2018 12	VfL Wolfsburg	1–0	RB Leipzig	Wolfsburg
15:30 CET (UTC+1)	Roussillon 50'	Report		Stadium: Volkswagen Arena; Attendance: 22,832; Referee: Tobias Stieler

2 December 2018 13	Eintracht Frankfurt	1–2	VfL Wolfsburg	Frankfurt
18:00 CET (UTC+1)	Jović 87'	Report	Mehmedi 31'; Ginczek 68'	Stadium: Commerzbank-Arena; Attendance: 48,000; Referee: Sascha Stegemann

8 December 2018 14	VfL Wolfsburg	2–2	1899 Hoffenheim	Wolfsburg
15:30 CET (UTC+1)	Bičakčić 28' (o.g.); Ginczek 31'	Report	Belfodil 4'; Kramarić 71'	Stadium: Volkswagen Arena; Attendance: 20,602; Referee: Felix Zwayer

14 December 2018 15	1. FC Nürnberg	0–2	VfL Wolfsburg	Nuremberg
20:30 CET (UTC+1)		Report	Ginczek 58'; Brekalo 90+3'	Stadium: Max-Morlock-Stadion; Attendance: 29,604; Referee: Sven Jablonski

18 December 2018 16	VfL Wolfsburg	2–0	VfB Stuttgart	Wolfsburg
20:30 CET (UTC+1)	Guilavogui 24'; Weghorst 44'	Report		Stadium: Volkswagen Arena; Attendance: 21,780; Referee: Robert Hartmann

23 December 2018 17	FC Augsburg	2–3	VfL Wolfsburg	Augsburg
15:30 CET (UTC+1)	Khedira 49'; Córdova 58'	Report	Guilavogui 33'; William 41'; Gerhardt 89'	Stadium: WWK Arena; Attendance: 28,152; Referee: Sören Storks

20 January 2019 18	Schalke 04	2–1	VfL Wolfsburg	Gelsenkirchen
18:00 CET (UTC+1)	Caligiuri 8' (pen.), 78'	Report	Rexhbeçaj 20'	Stadium: Veltins-Arena; Attendance: 58,827; Referee: Manuel Gräfe

26 January 2019 19	VfL Wolfsburg	0–3	Bayer Leverkusen	Wolfsburg
15:30 CET (UTC+1)		Report	Havertz 45' (pen.); Volland 62'; Brandt 88'	Stadium: Volkswagen Arena; Attendance: 21,736; Referee: Felix Zwayer

2 February 2019 20	Hertha BSC	0–1	VfL Wolfsburg	Berlin
15:30 CET (UTC+1)		Report	Weghorst 65'	Stadium: Olympiastadion Berlin; Attendance: 39,259; Referee: Bastian Dankert

9 February 2019 21	SC Freiburg	3–3	VfL Wolfsburg	Freiburg
15:30 CET (UTC+1)	Grifo 37'; Petersen 70'; Waldschmidt 87'	Report	Roussillon 11'; Weghorst 63' (pen.); Steffen 74'	Stadium: Schwarzwald-Stadion; Attendance: 23,600; Referee: Felix Brych

16 February 2019 22	VfL Wolfsburg	3–0	Mainz 05	Wolfsburg
15:30 CET (UTC+1)	Arnold 4'; Weghorst 69' (pen.); Knoche 76'	Report		Stadium: Volkswagen Arena; Attendance: 20,334; Referee: Benjamin Cortus

23 February 2019 23	Borussia Mönchengladbach	0–3	VfL Wolfsburg	Mönchengladbach
15:30 CET (UTC+1)		Report	Gerhardt 38'; Mehmedi 68', 83'	Stadium: Borussia-Park; Attendance: 48,041; Referee: Robert Kampka

3 March 2019 24	VfL Wolfsburg	1–1	Werder Bremen	Wolfsburg
18:00 CET (UTC+1)	Brooks 54'	Report	Kruse 74'	Stadium: Volkswagen Arena; Attendance: 28,101; Referee: Daniel Siebert

9 March 2019 25	Bayern Munich	6–0	VfL Wolfsburg	Munich
15:30 CET (UTC+1)	Gnabry 34'; Lewandowski 37', 85'; Rodríguez 52'; Müller 76'; Kimmich 82'	Report		Stadium: Allianz Arena; Attendance: 75,000; Referee: Sascha Stegemann

16 March 2019 26	VfL Wolfsburg	5–2	Fortuna Düsseldorf	Wolfsburg
15:30 CET (UTC+1)	Mehmedi 34'; Weghorst 54', 59', 88'; Knoche 57'	Report	Ayhan 30'; Raman 65'	Stadium: Volkswagen Arena; Attendance: 25,350; Referee: Bastian Dankert

30 March 2019 27	Borussia Dortmund	2–0	VfL Wolfsburg	Dortmund
15:30 CET (UTC+1)	Alcácer 90+1', 90+4'	Report		Stadium: Signal Iduna Park; Attendance: 81,365; Referee: Markus Schmidt

6 April 2019 28	VfL Wolfsburg	3–1	Hannover 96	Wolfsburg
15:30 CEST (UTC+2)	Steffen 32', 71'; Roussillon 78'	Report	Weydandt 30'	Stadium: Volkswagen Arena; Attendance: 23,512; Referee: Benjamin Cortus

13 April 2019 29	RB Leipzig	2–0	VfL Wolfsburg	Leipzig
15:30 CEST (UTC+2)	Kampl 16'; Werner 28'	Report		Stadium: Red Bull Arena; Attendance: 41,212; Referee: Daniel Siebert

22 April 2019 30	VfL Wolfsburg	1–1	Eintracht Frankfurt	Wolfsburg
20:30 CEST (UTC+2)	Brooks 90'	Report	de Guzmán 78'	Stadium: Volkswagen Arena; Attendance: 26,102; Referee: Marco Fritz

28 April 2019 31	1899 Hoffenheim	1–4	VfL Wolfsburg	Sinsheim
15:30 CEST (UTC+2)	Szalai 9'	Report	William 41'; Weghorst 69', 88'; Arnold 85'	Stadium: PreZero Arena; Attendance: 27,725; Referee: Deniz Aytekin

4 May 2019 32	VfL Wolfsburg	2–0	1. FC Nürnberg	Wolfsburg
15:30 CEST (UTC+2)	Klaus 38'; Tisserand 78'	Report		Stadium: Volkswagen Arena; Attendance: 22,512; Referee: Daniel Siebert

11 May 2019 33	VfB Stuttgart	3–0	VfL Wolfsburg	Stuttgart
15:30 CEST (UTC+2)	Castro 45+1'; Donis 55'; Didavi 83'	Report		Stadium: Mercedes-Benz Arena; Attendance: 54,068; Referee: Felix Brych

18 May 2019 34	VfL Wolfsburg	8–1	FC Augsburg	Wolfsburg
15:30 CEST (UTC+2)	Weghorst 21', 37', 55'; Knoche 41'; Ginczek 57'; Rexhbeçaj 60'; Brekalo 85'; Danso 89' (o.g.)	Report	Schieber 81'	Stadium: Volkswagen Arena; Attendance: 24,486; Referee: Felix Zwayer

=== DFB-Pokal ===
18 August 2018 First round	SV Elversberg	0–1	VfL Wolfsburg	Spiesen-Elversberg
15:30 CEST (UTC+2)		Report	Ginczek 76'	Stadium: Ursapharm-Arena an der Kaiserlinde; Attendance: 5,000; Referee: Lasse Koslowski

30 October 2018 Second round	Hannover 96	0–2	VfL Wolfsburg	Hanover
18:30 CET (UTC+1)	Mehmedi 20'; Weghorst 90+3'	Report		Stadium: HDI-Arena; Attendance: 34,400; Referee: Benjamin Cortus

6 February 2019 Round of 16	RB Leipzig	1–0	VfL Wolfsburg	Leipzig
18:30 CET (UTC+1)	Cunha 9'	Report		Stadium: Red Bull Arena; Attendance: 21,135; Referee: Christian Dingert

== Statistics ==
=== Appearances and goals ===
No.	Pos	Nat	Player	Total		Bundesliga		DFB-Pokal	
No.	Pos	Nat	Player	Apps	Goals	Apps	Goals	Apps	Goals
Goalkeepers
1	GK	(Belgium) BEL	Koen Casteels	29	0	26	0	3	0
12	GK	(Austria) AUT	Pavao Pervan	9	0	8+1	0	0	0
36	GK	(Germany) GER	Phillip Menzel	0	0	0	0	0	0
Defenders
2	DF	(Brazil) BRA	William	33	2	30+1	2	2	0
3	DF	(Netherlands) NED	Paul Verhaegh	3	0	2	0	1	0
13	DF	(Germany) GER	Yannick Gerhardt	33	2	28+2	2	3	0
15	DF	(France) FRA	Jérôme Roussillon	31	3	28	3	3	0
17	DF	(Germany) GER	Ohis Felix Uduokhai	12	0	2+9	0	0+1	0
24	DF	(Germany) GER	Sebastian Jung	1	0	1	0	0	0
25	DF	(United States) USA	John Brooks	32	3	29	3	3	0
31	DF	(Germany) GER	Robin Knoche	33	3	30	3	2+1	0
32	DF	(Democratic Republic of the Congo) COD	Marcel Tisserand	12	1	11	1	1	0
35	DF	(Germany) GER	Gian-Luca Itter	2	0	1+1	0	0	0
Midfielders
4	MF	(Spain) ESP	Ignacio Camacho	6	0	6	0	0	0
8	MF	(Switzerland) SUI	Renato Steffen	33	5	18+13	5	2	0
10	MF	(Turkey) TUR	Yunus Mallı	23	1	5+16	1	1+1	0
11	MF	(Germany) GER	Felix Klaus	16	1	5+10	1	0+1	0
14	MF	(Switzerland) SUI	Admir Mehmedi	28	7	20+6	6	1+1	1
21	MF	(Cameroon) CMR	Paul-Georges Ntep	0	0	0	0	0	0
23	MF	(France) FRA	Josuha Guilavogui	20	2	18+1	2	1	0
27	MF	(Germany) GER	Maximilian Arnold	35	2	32	2	3	0
29	MF	(Germany) GER	John Yeboah	3	0	0+2	0	0+1	0
34	MF	(Germany) GER	Marvin Stefaniak	0	0	0	0	0	0
37	MF	(Germany) GER	Elvis Rexhbeçaj	27	2	14+11	2	2	0
38	MF	(Belgium) BEL	Ismail Azzaoui	0	0	0	0	0	0
Forwards
7	FW	(Croatia) CRO	Josip Brekalo	27	3	15+10	3	1+1	0
9	FW	(Netherlands) NED	Wout Weghorst	36	18	33+1	17	2	1
33	FW	(Germany) GER	Daniel Ginczek	26	7	12+12	6	2	1
Players transferred out during the season
5	DF	(Netherlands) NED	Jeffrey Bruma	0	0	0	0	0	0
16	MF	(Poland) POL	Jakub Błaszczykowski	2	0	0+1	0	0+1	0
30	MF	(Germany) GER	Paul Seguin	0	0	0	0	0	0

Last updated: 18 May 2019
Source: Competitions
