= 2017–18 VfL Wolfsburg season =

VfL Wolfsburg
2017–18 season
- Owner: Volkswagen
- Executive director: Francisco Javier García Sanz
- Manager: Andries Jonker (until 18 September); Martin Schmidt (18 September – 19 February); Bruno Labbadia (from 20 February)
- Stadium: Volkswagen Arena
- Bundesliga: 16th (play-off winners)
- DFB-Pokal: Quarter-finals
- Top goalscorer: League: Daniel Didavi (9); All: Daniel Didavi (10)
- Highest home attendance: 30,000
- Lowest home attendance: 15,508
- Average home league attendance: 25,712
- Biggest win: Wolfsburg 3–0 Gladbach; Wolfsburg 4–1 Köln
- Biggest defeat: Wolfsburg 0–3 Dortmund; Hoffenheim 3–0 Wolfsburg; Gladbach 3–0 Wolfsburg; Leipzig 4–1 Wolfsburg
Home colours	Away colours	Third colours
- All statistics correct as of 21 May 2018.

The 2017–18 VfL Wolfsburg season was the 73rd season in the football club's history and 21st consecutive and overall season in the top flight of German football, the Bundesliga, having been promoted from the 2. Bundesliga in 1997. In addition to the domestic league, VfL Wolfsburg also participated in the season's edition of the domestic cup, the DFB-Pokal. This was the 16th season for Wolfsburg in the Volkswagen Arena, located in Wolfsburg, Lower Saxony, Germany. The season covers a period from 1 July 2017 to 30 June 2018.

== Players ==
=== Squad information ===
As of 7 April 2018

Note: Flags indicate national team as defined under FIFA eligibility rules; some limited exceptions apply. Players may hold more than one non-FIFA nationality.

No.	Pos.	Nation	Player
1	GK	BEL	Koen Casteels
2	DF	BRA	William
3	DF	NED	Paul Verhaegh (vice-captain)
4	MF	ESP	Ignacio Camacho (captain)
5	DF	NED	Jeffrey Bruma
6	MF	NED	Riechedly Bazoer
8	MF	SUI	Renato Steffen
9	FW	BEL	Landry Dimata
10	MF	TUR	Yunus Mallı
11	MF	GER	Daniel Didavi
13	MF	GER	Yannick Gerhardt
14	FW	BEL	Divock Origi (on loan from Liverpool)
16	MF	POL	Jakub Błaszczykowski
17	DF	GER	Ohis Felix Uduokhai
18	FW	NGA	Victor Osimhen

No.	Pos.	Nation	Player
20	GK	GER	Max Grün
21	FW	CRO	Josip Brekalo
22	FW	SUI	Admir Mehmedi
23	MF	FRA	Josuha Guilavogui
24	DF	GER	Sebastian Jung
25	DF	USA	John Brooks
26	MF	GER	Justin Möbius
27	MF	GER	Maximilian Arnold
29	DF	COD	Marcel Tisserand (on loan from FC Ingolstadt)
31	DF	GER	Robin Knoche
35	DF	GER	Gian-Luca Itter
36	GK	GER	Phillip Menzel
37	MF	GER	Elvis Rexhbeçaj
39	DF	GER	Paul Jaeckel

== Competitions ==
Win Draw Loss

=== Overview ===
Competition	First match	Last match	Starting round	Final position	Record							
Competition	First match	Last match	Starting round	Final position	Pld	W	D	L	GF	GA	GD	Win %
Bundesliga	19 August 2017	12 May 2018	Matchday 1	16th	34	6	15	13	36	48	−12	17.65
Bundesliga relegation play-offs	17 May 2018	21 May 2018	First leg	Winners	2	2	0	0	4	1	+3	100.00
DFB-Pokal	13 August 2017	7 February 2018	First round	Quarter-finals	4	3	0	1	4	1	+3	75.00
Total					40	11	15	14	44	50	−6	27.50

Last updated: 21 May 2018
Source: Competitions

=== Bundesliga ===
==== League table ====
Pos	Team	Pld	W	D	L	GF	GA	GD	Pts	Qualification or relegation
14	Mainz 05	34	9	9	16	38	52	−14	36	
15	SC Freiburg	34	8	12	14	32	56	−24	36	
16	VfL Wolfsburg (O)	34	6	15	13	36	48	−12	33	Qualification for the relegation play-offs
17	Hamburger SV (R)	34	8	7	19	29	53	−24	31	Relegation to 2. Bundesliga
18	1. FC Köln (R)	34	5	7	22	35	70	−35	22	Relegation to 2. Bundesliga

Source: DFB
Rules for classification: 1) Points; 2) Goal difference; 3) Goals scored; 4) Head-to-head results; 5) Head-to-head away goals scored; 6) Away goals scored; 7) Play-off.
(O) Play-off winners; (R) Relegated

==== Results summary ====
Overall								Home						Away					
Pld	W	D	L	GF	GA	GD	Pts	W	D	L	GF	GA	GD	W	D	L	GF	GA	GD
34	6	15	13	36	48	−12	33	3	8	6	23	25	−2	3	7	7	13	23	−10

Last updated: 21 May 2018.
Source: Bundesliga

==== Results by round ====
Round	1	2	3	4	5	6	7	8	9	10	11	12	13	14	15	16	17	18	19	20	21	22	23	24	25	26	27	28	29	30	31	32	33	34
Ground	H	A	H	A	H	A	H	A	H	A	H	H	A	H	A	H	A	A	H	A	H	A	H	A	H	A	H	A	A	H	A	H	A	H
Result	L	W	D	L	D	D	D	D	D	D	D	W	L	W	D	D	L	D	L	W	D	L	L	D	L	L	L	D	W	D	L	L	L	W
Position	18	11	12	14	13	13	12	14	14	14	14	13	14	11	11	12	12	12	13	13	13	13	14	15	15	15	15	15	15	14	14	16	16	16

Updated to match(es) played on 21 May 2018. Source: Bundesliga
A = Away; H = Home; W = Win; D = Draw; L = Loss

==== Matches ====
19 August 2017 1	VfL Wolfsburg	0–3	Borussia Dortmund	Wolfsburg
15:30 CEST (UTC+2)		Report	Pulisic 22'; Bartra 27'; Aubameyang 60'	Stadium: Volkswagen Arena; Attendance: 30,000; Referee: Robert Hartmann

26 August 2017 2	Eintracht Frankfurt	0–1	VfL Wolfsburg	Frankfurt
15:30 CEST (UTC+2)		Report	Didavi 22'	Stadium: Commerzbank-Arena; Attendance: 46,000; Referee: Benjamin Cortus

9 September 2017 3	VfL Wolfsburg	1–1	Hannover 96	Wolfsburg
15:30 CEST (UTC+2)	Didavi 52'	Report	Harnik 75'	Stadium: Volkswagen Arena; Attendance: 27,321; Referee: Felix Zwayer

16 September 2017 4	VfB Stuttgart	1–0	VfL Wolfsburg	Stuttgart
15:30 CEST (UTC+2)	Akolo 42'	Report		Stadium: Mercedes-Benz Arena; Attendance: 50,500; Referee: Guido Winkmann

19 September 2017 5	VfL Wolfsburg	1–1	Werder Bremen	Wolfsburg
20:30 CEST (UTC+2)	Origi 28'	Report	Bartels 56'	Stadium: Volkswagen Arena; Attendance: 26,174; Referee: Felix Brych

22 September 2017 6	Bayern Munich	2–2	VfL Wolfsburg	Munich
20:30 CEST (UTC+2)	Lewandowski 33' (pen.); Robben 42'	Report	Arnold 56'; Didavi 83'	Stadium: Allianz Arena; Attendance: 75,000; Referee: Christian Dingert

30 September 2017 7	VfL Wolfsburg	1–1	Mainz 05	Wolfsburg
15:30 CEST (UTC+2)	Guilavogui 55'	Report	Mutō 74'	Stadium: Volkswagen Arena; Attendance: 24,352; Referee: Robert Hartmann

15 October 2017 8	Bayer Leverkusen	2–2	VfL Wolfsburg	Leverkusen
15:30 CEST (UTC+2)	L. Bender 29'; Alario 61'	Report	Origi 44'; Błaszczykowski 69'	Stadium: BayArena; Attendance: 29,104; Referee: Patrick Ittrich

22 October 2017 9	VfL Wolfsburg	1–1	1899 Hoffenheim	Wolfsburg
18:00 CEST (UTC+2)	Uduokhai 90+1'	Report	Demirbay 73' (pen.)	Stadium: Volkswagen Arena; Attendance: 23,514; Referee: Felix Zwayer

28 October 2017 10	Schalke 04	1–1	VfL Wolfsburg	Gelsenkirchen
15:30 CEST (UTC+2)	Bentaleb 43' (pen.)	Report	Origi 90+3'	Stadium: Veltins-Arena; Attendance: 60,429; Referee: Markus Schmidt

5 November 2017 11	VfL Wolfsburg	3–3	Hertha BSC	Wolfsburg
18:00 CET (UTC+1)	Mallı 41'; Gómez 44'; Origi 60'	Report	Ibišević 1'; Rekik 53'; Selke 83'	Stadium: Volkswagen Arena; Attendance: 25,214; Referee: Robert Kampka

18 November 2017 12	VfL Wolfsburg	3–1	SC Freiburg	Wolfsburg
15:30 CET (UTC+1)	Gerhardt 3'; Mallı 29', 70'	Report	Kapustka 68'	Stadium: Volkswagen Arena; Attendance: 23,744; Referee: Manuel Gräfe

25 November 2017 13	FC Augsburg	2–1	VfL Wolfsburg	Augsburg
15:30 CET (UTC+1)	Gregoritsch 51'; Finnbogason 78'	Report	Didavi 40'	Stadium: WWK Arena; Attendance: 26,541; Referee: Tobias Stieler

3 December 2017 14	VfL Wolfsburg	3–0	Borussia Mönchengladbach	Wolfsburg
18:00 CET (UTC+1)	Mallı 4'; Didavi 25'; Guilavogui 71'	Report		Stadium: Volkswagen Arena; Attendance: 24,250; Referee: Benjamin Cortus

9 December 2017 15	Hamburger SV	0–0	VfL Wolfsburg	Hamburg
15:30 CET (UTC+1)		Report		Stadium: Volksparkstadion; Attendance: 45,226; Referee: Christian Dingert

12 December 2017 16	VfL Wolfsburg	1–1	RB Leipzig	Wolfsburg
18:30 CET (UTC+1)	Verhaegh 15' (pen.)	Report	Halstenberg 52'	Stadium: Volkswagen Arena; Attendance: 22,827; Referee: Guido Winkmann

16 December 2017 17	1. FC Köln	1–0	VfL Wolfsburg	Cologne
15:30 CET (UTC+1)	Clemens 67'	Report		Stadium: RheinEnergieStadion; Attendance: 41,100; Referee: Benjamin Brand

14 January 2018 18	Borussia Dortmund	0–0	VfL Wolfsburg	Dortmund
18:00 CET (UTC+1)		Report		Stadium: Signal Iduna Park; Attendance: 80,600; Referee: Tobias Stieler

20 January 2018 19	VfL Wolfsburg	1–3	Eintracht Frankfurt	Wolfsburg
15:30 CET (UTC+1)	Arnold 66'	Report	Haller 18'; Chandler 22'; Jović 85'	Stadium: Volkswagen Arena; Attendance: 24,450; Referee: Markus Schmidt

28 January 2018 20	Hannover 96	0–1	VfL Wolfsburg	Hanover
18:00 CET (UTC+1)		Report	Mallı 72'	Stadium: HDI-Arena; Attendance: 34,300; Referee: Felix Brych

3 February 2018 21	VfL Wolfsburg	1–1	VfB Stuttgart	Wolfsburg
15:30 CET (UTC+1)	Origi 24'	Report	Gómez 60'	Stadium: Volkswagen Arena; Attendance: 24,378; Referee: Robert Hartmann

11 February 2018 22	Werder Bremen	3–1	VfL Wolfsburg	Bremen
18:00 CET (UTC+1)	Augustinsson 4'; Kainz 40', 72'	Report	Verhaegh 49'	Stadium: Weser-Stadion; Attendance: 38,062; Referee: Deniz Aytekin

17 February 2018 23	VfL Wolfsburg	1–2	Bayern Munich	Wolfsburg
15:30 CET (UTC+1)	Didavi 8'	Report	Wagner 64'; Lewandowski 90+1' (pen.)	Stadium: Volkswagen Arena; Attendance: 30,000; Referee: Sascha Stegemann

23 February 2018 24	Mainz 05	1–1	VfL Wolfsburg	Mainz
20:30 CET (UTC+1)	Mutō 44'	Report	Brekalo 6'	Stadium: Opel Arena; Attendance: 25,173; Referee: Bastian Dankert

3 March 2018 25	VfL Wolfsburg	1–2	Bayer Leverkusen	Wolfsburg
15:30 CET (UTC+1)	Mehmedi 79'	Report	Alario 31' (pen.); Brandt 78'	Stadium: Volkswagen Arena; Attendance: 24,354; Referee: Felix Zwayer

10 March 2018 26	1899 Hoffenheim	3–0	VfL Wolfsburg	Sinsheim
15:30 CET (UTC+1)	Schulz 18'; Gnabry 77'; Guilavogui 80' (o.g.)	Report		Stadium: Wirsol Rhein-Neckar-Arena; Attendance: 25,550; Referee: Manuel Gräfe

17 March 2018 27	VfL Wolfsburg	0–1	Schalke 04	Wolfsburg
18:30 CET (UTC+1)		Report	Knoche 86' (o.g.)	Stadium: Volkswagen Arena; Attendance: 27,502; Referee: Benjamin Cortus

31 March 2018 28	Hertha BSC	0–0	VfL Wolfsburg	Berlin
20:30 CEST (UTC+2)		Report		Stadium: Olympiastadion Berlin; Attendance: 34,765; Referee: Deniz Aytekin

7 April 2018 29	SC Freiburg	0–2	VfL Wolfsburg	Freiburg
15:30 CEST (UTC+2)		Report	Didavi 2', 83'	Stadium: Schwarzwald-Stadion; Attendance: 24,000; Referee: Sascha Stegemann

13 April 2018 30	VfL Wolfsburg	0–0	FC Augsburg	Wolfsburg
20:30 CEST (UTC+2)		Report		Stadium: Volkswagen Arena; Attendance: 23,512; Referee: Patrick Ittrich

20 April 2018 31	Borussia Mönchengladbach	3–0	VfL Wolfsburg	Mönchengladbach
20:30 CEST (UTC+2)	Stindl 8'; Raffael 35'; Kramer 44'	Report		Stadium: Borussia-Park; Attendance: 47,797; Referee: Tobias Stieler

28 April 2018 32	VfL Wolfsburg	1–3	Hamburger SV	Wolfsburg
15:30 CEST (UTC+2)	Brekalo 78'	Report	Wood 43' (pen.); Holtby 45+1'; Waldschmidt 90+3'	Stadium: Volkswagen Arena; Attendance: 29,400; Referee: Daniel Siebert

5 May 2018 33	RB Leipzig	4–1	VfL Wolfsburg	Leipzig
15:30 CEST (UTC+2)	Lookman 24', 52'; Werner 33'; Augustin 63'	Report	Didavi 47'	Stadium: Red Bull Arena; Attendance: 41,487; Referee: Marco Fritz

12 May 2018 34	VfL Wolfsburg	4–1	1. FC Köln	Wolfsburg
15:30 CEST (UTC+2)	Guilavogui 1'; Origi 54'; Knoche 71'; Brekalo 90+1'	Report	Hector 32'	Stadium: Volkswagen Arena; Attendance: 26,112; Referee: Markus Schmidt

==== Relegation play-offs ====
17 May 2018 First leg	VfL Wolfsburg	3–1	Holstein Kiel	Wolfsburg
20:30 CEST (UTC+2)	Origi 13'; Brekalo 40'; Mallı 56'	Report	Schindler 34'	Stadium: Volkswagen Arena; Attendance: 28,800; Referee: Deniz Aytekin

21 May 2018 Second leg	Holstein Kiel	0–1 (1–4 agg.)	VfL Wolfsburg	Kiel
20:30 CEST (UTC+2)		Report	Knoche 75'	Stadium: Holstein-Stadion; Attendance: 12,000; Referee: Daniel Siebert

=== DFB-Pokal ===
13 August 2017 First round	Eintracht Norderstedt	0–1	VfL Wolfsburg	Norderstedt
15:30 CEST (UTC+2)		Report	Camacho 59'	Stadium: Edmund-Plambeck-Stadion; Attendance: 4,500; Referee: Lasse Koslowski

25 October 2017 Second round	VfL Wolfsburg	1–0	Hannover 96	Wolfsburg
18:30 CEST (UTC+2)	Uduokhai 49'	Report		Stadium: Volkswagen Arena; Attendance: 15,508; Referee: Felix Brych

19 December 2017 Round of 16	1. FC Nürnberg	0–2 (a.e.t.)	VfL Wolfsburg	Nuremberg
20:45 CET (UTC+1)		Report	Uduokhai 96'; Didavi 118'	Stadium: Max-Morlock-Stadion; Attendance: 26,104; Referee: Daniel Siebert

7 February 2018 Quarter-finals	Schalke 04	1–0	VfL Wolfsburg	Gelsenkirchen
20:45 CET (UTC+1)	Burgstaller 10'	Report		Stadium: Veltins-Arena; Attendance: 50,642; Referee: Christian Dingert

== Statistics ==
=== Appearances and goals ===
No.	Pos	Nat	Player	Total		Bundesliga		DFB-Pokal		Play-offs	
No.	Pos	Nat	Player	Apps	Goals	Apps	Goals	Apps	Goals	Apps	Goals
Goalkeepers
1	GK	(Belgium) BEL	Koen Casteels	39	0	34	0	3	0	2	0
20	GK	(Germany) GER	Max Grün	1	0	0	0	1	0	0	0
36	GK	(Germany) GER	Phillip Menzel	0	0	0	0	0	0	0	0
Defenders
2	DF	(Brazil) BRA	William	26	0	19+3	0	1+1	0	2	0
3	DF	(Netherlands) NED	Paul Verhaegh	33	2	30+1	2	2	0	0	0
5	DF	(Netherlands) NED	Jeffrey Bruma	13	0	11	0	2	0	0	0
17	DF	(Germany) GER	Ohis Felix Uduokhai	24	3	17+2	1	2+1	2	2	0
24	DF	(Germany) GER	Sebastian Jung	4	0	1+1	0	1+1	0	0	0
25	DF	(United States) USA	John Brooks	12	0	9	0	1	0	2	0
29	DF	(Democratic Republic of the Congo) COD	Marcel Tisserand	19	0	14+2	0	3	0	0	0
31	DF	(Germany) GER	Robin Knoche	29	2	24	1	3	0	2	1
35	DF	(Germany) GER	Gian-Luca Itter	5	0	5	0	0	0	0	0
39	DF	(Germany) GER	Paul Jaeckel	3	0	3	0	0	0	0	0
Midfielders
4	MF	(Spain) ESP	Ignacio Camacho	15	1	11	0	2	1	0+2	0
6	MF	(Netherlands) NED	Riechedly Bazoer	14	0	6+7	0	1	0	0	0
8	MF	(Switzerland) SUI	Renato Steffen	18	0	6+10	0	0	0	2	0
10	MF	(Turkey) TUR	Yunus Mallı	37	6	24+7	5	3+1	0	2	1
11	MF	(Germany) GER	Daniel Didavi	33	10	26+4	9	1+2	1	0	0
13	MF	(Germany) GER	Yannick Gerhardt	17	1	12+5	1	0	0	0	0
16	MF	(Poland) POL	Jakub Błaszczykowski	13	1	6+3	1	2	0	0+2	0
23	MF	(France) FRA	Josuha Guilavogui	35	3	27+2	3	2+2	0	2	0
26	MF	(Germany) GER	Justin Möbius	0	0	0	0	0	0	0	0
27	MF	(Germany) GER	Maximilian Arnold	34	2	28+1	2	3	0	2	0
37	MF	(Germany) GER	Elvis Rexhbeçaj	4	0	1+3	0	0	0	0	0
Forwards
9	FW	(Belgium) BEL	Landry Dimata	24	0	9+12	0	1	0	0+2	0
14	FW	(Belgium) BEL	Divock Origi	36	7	22+9	6	2+1	0	2	1
18	FW	(Nigeria) NGA	Victor Osimhen	13	0	3+9	0	0+1	0	0	0
21	FW	(Croatia) CRO	Josip Brekalo	15	4	10+3	3	0	0	2	1
22	FW	(Switzerland) SUI	Admir Mehmedi	6	1	3+2	1	1	0	0	0
Players transferred out during the season
7	MF	(France) FRA	Paul-Georges Ntep	7	0	1+4	0	1+1	0	0	0
32	FW	(England) ENG	Kaylen Hinds	2	0	1	0	1	0	0	0
33	FW	(Germany) GER	Mario Gómez	15	1	11+1	1	2+1	0	0	0

Last updated: 21 May 2018
Source: Competitions
