= Daniel Ginczek =

German footballer (born 1991)

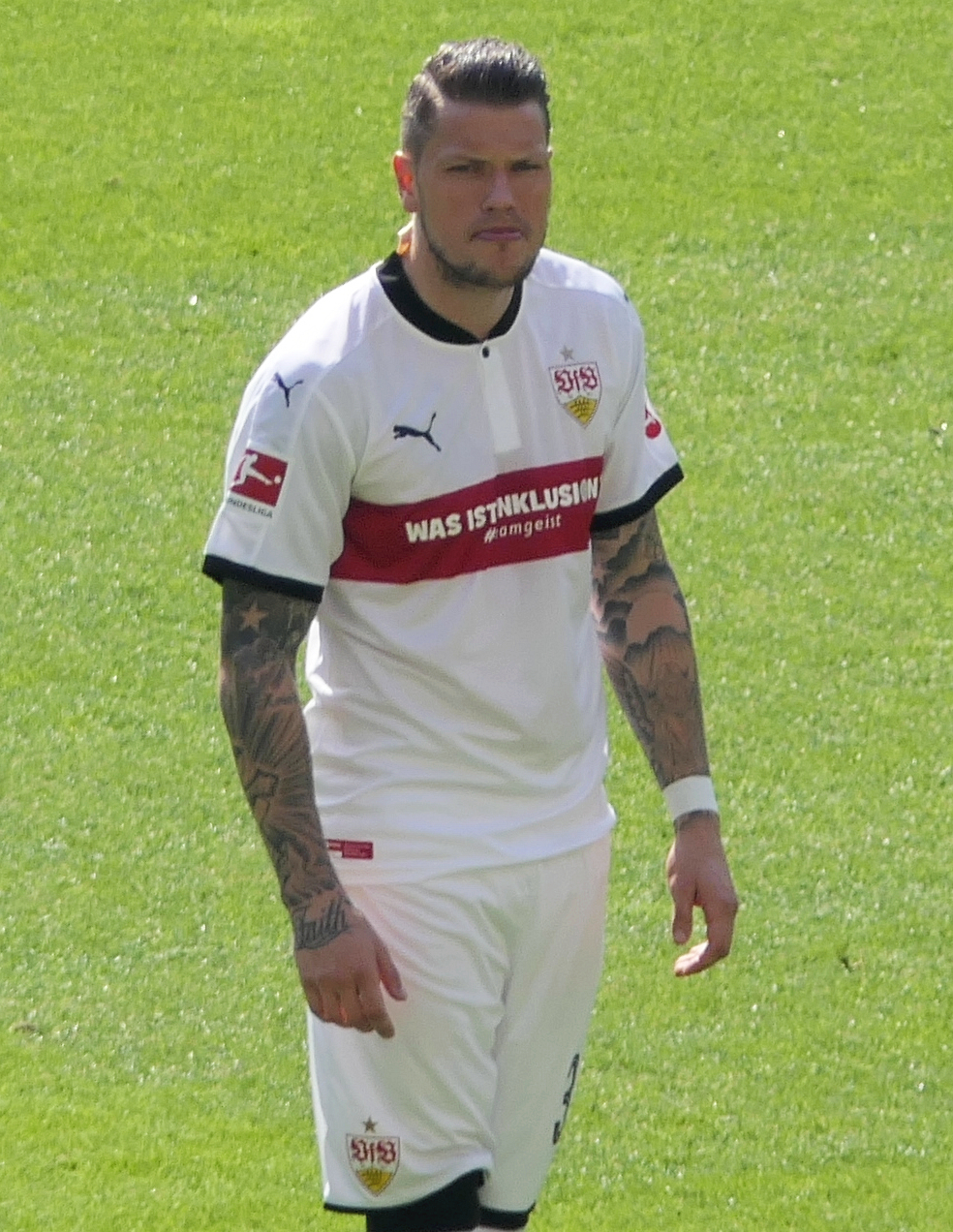
- Ginczek with VfB Stuttgart in 2018

Personal information
- Date of birth: 13 April 1991 (age 35)
- Place of birth: Arnsberg, Germany
- Height: 1.91 m (6 ft 3 in)
- Position: Forward

Youth career
- 1995–2007: SC Neheim
- 2007–2009: Borussia Dortmund

Senior career*
Years	Team	Apps	(Gls)
2008–2011	Borussia Dortmund II	66	(28)
2010–2013	Borussia Dortmund	0	(0)
2011–2012	→ VfL Bochum (loan)	29	(5)
2012–2013	→ FC St. Pauli (loan)	31	(18)
2013–2014	1. FC Nürnberg	17	(3)
2013	1. FC Nürnberg II	1	(0)
2014–2018	VfB Stuttgart	67	(21)
2014–2015	VfB Stuttgart II	5	(5)
2018–2022	VfL Wolfsburg	55	(9)
2019–2022	VfL Wolfsburg II	1	(2)
2022–2024	Fortuna Düsseldorf	42	(8)
2022–2023	Fortuna Düsseldorf II	1	(1)
2024	MSV Duisburg	14	(2)
Total		329	(102)

International career
2008	Germany U17	2	(0)
2008–2009	Germany U18	6	(3)
2009–2010	Germany U19	7	(1)
2010–2012	Germany U21	6	(2)
- * Club domestic league appearances and goals as of 11:05, 4 May 2024 (UTC)

Daniel Ginczek (born 13 April 1991) is a German retired professional footballer who played as a forward.

== Club career ==
=== Borussia Dortmund ===
In the 2007–08 season, he was the best scorer in the U-17 league. In 25 games, he scored 26 goals. In the U-18 national team, Ginczek scored three goals in six games, he also took part in seven matches of the U-19 national team, scoring on one occasion.

Since the 2008–09 season he was playing for the reserves of Borussia Dortmund. He made his debut in professional football on 28 July 2009 at a 0–0 draw against the reserve team of Eintracht Braunschweig.

In 2010, Ginczek was promoted to the Borussia Dortmund first team.

On 10 June 2011, Ginczek joined VfL Bochum on loan until the end of the 2011–12 season. He scored his first goal in a 1–0 win over FSV Frankfurt on 22 July 2011.

In June 2012, Ginczek joined FC St. Pauli on loan until the end of the 2012–13 season. He scored his first goal in the 77th minute at a 3–0 away win over Offenburger FV in the DFB-Pokal, on 18 August 2012. He became a key player for the Hamburg side, scoring 18 goals in 31 matches.

=== Later clubs ===
3 June 2013 saw the announcement of Ginczek having agreed to join Bundesliga side 1. FC Nürnberg for an undisclosed fee, signing a three-year contract.

For the 2014–15 season he moved to VfB Stuttgart. In May 2016 Ginczek extended his contract with Stuttgart until June 2020.

On 29 January 2022, Ginczek signed with Fortuna Düsseldorf until 30 June 2024. He left Düsseldorf on 8 January 2024. On the same day, he joined MSV Duisburg. After the season, which ended in relegation, he announced his retirement.

== Personal life ==
Ginczek's paternal grandparents are from Poland.

== Career statistics ==
As of match played 3 May 2024

Appearances and goals by club, season and competition
Club	Season	League			DFB-Pokal		Europe		Total	
Club	Season	Division	Apps	Goals	Apps	Goals	Apps	Goals	Apps	Goals
Borussia Dortmund II	2008–09	Regionalliga West	16	10	—		—		16	10
Borussia Dortmund II	2009–10	3. Liga	29	6	—		—		29	6
Borussia Dortmund II	2010–11	Regionalliga West	21	12	—		—		21	12
Borussia Dortmund II	Total		66	28	—		—		66	28
VfL Bochum (loan)	2011–12	2. Bundesliga	29	5	3	2	—		32	7
FC St. Pauli (loan)	2012–13	2. Bundesliga	31	18	1	1	—		32	19
1. FC Nürnberg	2013–14	Bundesliga	17	3	1	1	—		18	4
1. FC Nürnberg II	2013–14	Regionalliga Bayern	1	0	0	0	—		1	0
VfB Stuttgart	2014–15	Bundesliga	18	7	—		—		18	7
VfB Stuttgart	2015–16	Bundesliga	7	3	1	1	—		8	4
VfB Stuttgart	2016–17	2. Bundesliga	19	4	—		—		19	4
VfB Stuttgart	2017–18	Bundesliga	23	7	2	1	—		25	8
VfB Stuttgart	Total		67	21	3	2	—		70	23
VfB Stuttgart II	2014–15	3. Liga	5	5	—		—		5	5
VfL Wolfsburg	2018–19	Bundesliga	24	6	2	1	—		26	7
VfL Wolfsburg	2019–20	Bundesliga	18	3	0	0	5 (Note: Appearance(s) in UEFA Europa League)	0	23	3
VfL Wolfsburg	2020–21	Bundesliga	11	0	2	0	1	1	14	1
VfL Wolfsburg	2021–22	Bundesliga	2	0	0	0	1 (Note: Appearance(s) in UEFA Champions League)	0	3	0
VfL Wolfsburg	Total		55	9	4	1	7	1	66	11
VfL Wolfsburg II	2019–20	Regionalliga Nord	1	2	—		—		1	2
Fortuna Düsseldorf	2021–22	2. Bundesliga	9	3	0	0	—		9	3
Fortuna Düsseldorf	2022–23	2. Bundesliga	23	4	2	2	—		25	6
Fortuna Düsseldorf	2023–24	2. Bundesliga	10	1	2	0	—		12	1
Fortuna Düsseldorf	Total		42	8	4	2	—		46	10
Fortuna Düsseldorf II	2022–23	Regionalliga West	1	1	—		—		1	1
MSV Duisburg	2023–24	3. Liga	14	2	—		—		14	2
Career total			329	102	16	9	7	1	352	112
