= William (footballer, born 1995) =

Brazilian footballer (born 1995)

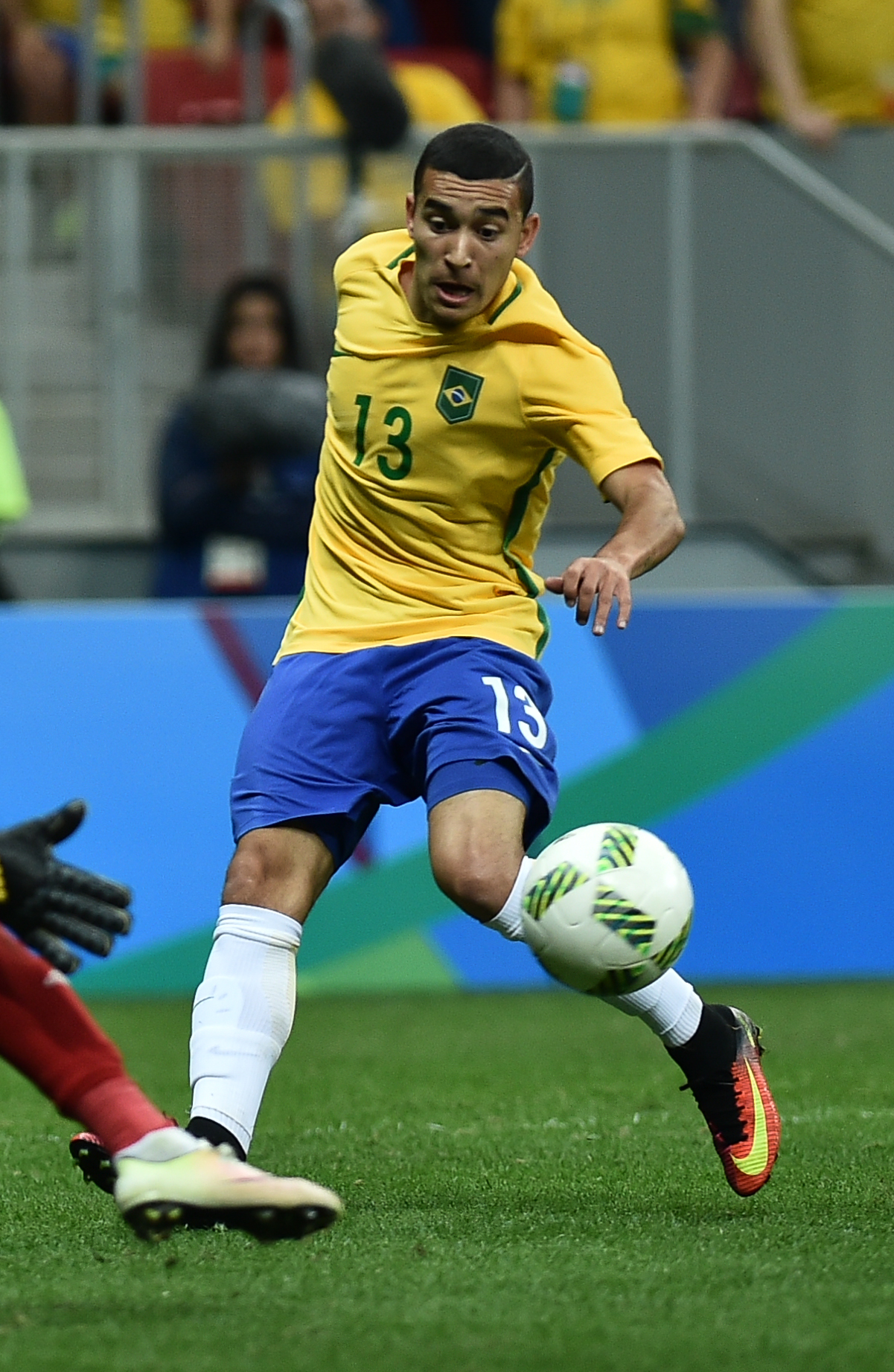
- William during the 2016 Summer Olympics

Personal information
- Full name: William de Asevedo Furtado
- Date of birth: 3 April 1995 (age 31)
- Place of birth: Pelotas, Brazil
- Height: 1.71 m (5 ft 7 in)
- Position: Right back

Team information
- Current team: Cruzeiro
- Number: 12

Youth career
- 2011–2012: Juventude
- 2012–2014: Internacional

Senior career*
Years	Team	Apps	(Gls)
2014–2017	Internacional	118	(1)
2017–2022	VfL Wolfsburg	73	(3)
2021	→ Schalke 04 (loan)	8	(0)
2023–	Cruzeiro	135	(6)

International career
2016	Brazil U23	3	(0)
Medal record
Olympic Games
Gold medal – first place	2016 Rio de Janeiro	Team
- * Club domestic league appearances and goals as of 9 April 2026

William de Asevedo Furtado (born 3 April 1995), known as William, is a Brazilian professional footballer who plays as a right back for Cruzeiro.

== International career ==
William was a part of the under-23 squad that won Brazil their first gold in football in the 2016 Rio de Janeiro Olympics. He was a reserve in all six matches behind Zeca, coming in on the second half in all three games of the group stage.

On 29 August 2024, William was called up for the full Brazilian national team, replacing the injured Yan Couto for the matches against Ecuador and Paraguay for the 2026 FIFA World Cup qualification. He did not play in those games.

== Career statistics ==
As of 1 July 2021

Club	Season	League			National Cup (Note: Includes Copa do Brasil and DFB-Pokal)		Continental (Note: Includes Copa Libertadores and UEFA Europa League)		Other (Note: Includes Campeonato Gaúcho, Primeira Liga and Bundesliga relegation play-offs)		Total	
Club	Season	Division	Apps	Goals	Apps	Goals	Apps	Goals	Apps	Goals	Apps	Goals
Internacional	2015	Série A	29	0	4	0	6	0	8	0	47	0
Internacional	2016	Série A	32	0	4	1	—		15	0	51	1
Internacional	2017	Série B	2	0	6	0	—		12	0	20	0
Internacional	Total		63	0	14	1	6	0	35	0	118	1
VfL Wolfsburg	2017–18	Bundesliga	22	0	2	0	—		2	0	26	0
VfL Wolfsburg	2018–19	Bundesliga	31	2	2	0	—		—		33	2
VfL Wolfsburg	2019–20	Bundesliga	16	1	2	1	4	1	—		22	3
VfL Wolfsburg	2020–21	Bundesliga	2	0	0	0	0	0	—		2	0
VfL Wolfsburg	Total		71	3	6	1	4	1	2	0	83	5
Schalke 04 (loan)	2020–21	Bundesliga	8	0	1	0	—		—		9	0
Career totals			142	3	21	2	10	1	37	0	210	6

== Honours ==
=== Club ===
Internacional

- Campeonato Brasileiro Sub-20:2013
- Copa do Brasil Sub-20: 2014
- Campeonato Gaúcho: 2015, 2016
- Recopa Gaúcha: 2016

Individual

- Bola de Prata: 2024
- Troféu Mesa Redonda Team of the Year: 2024

=== International ===
Brazil

- Olympic Gold Medal: 2016
