= Robin Knoche =

German footballer

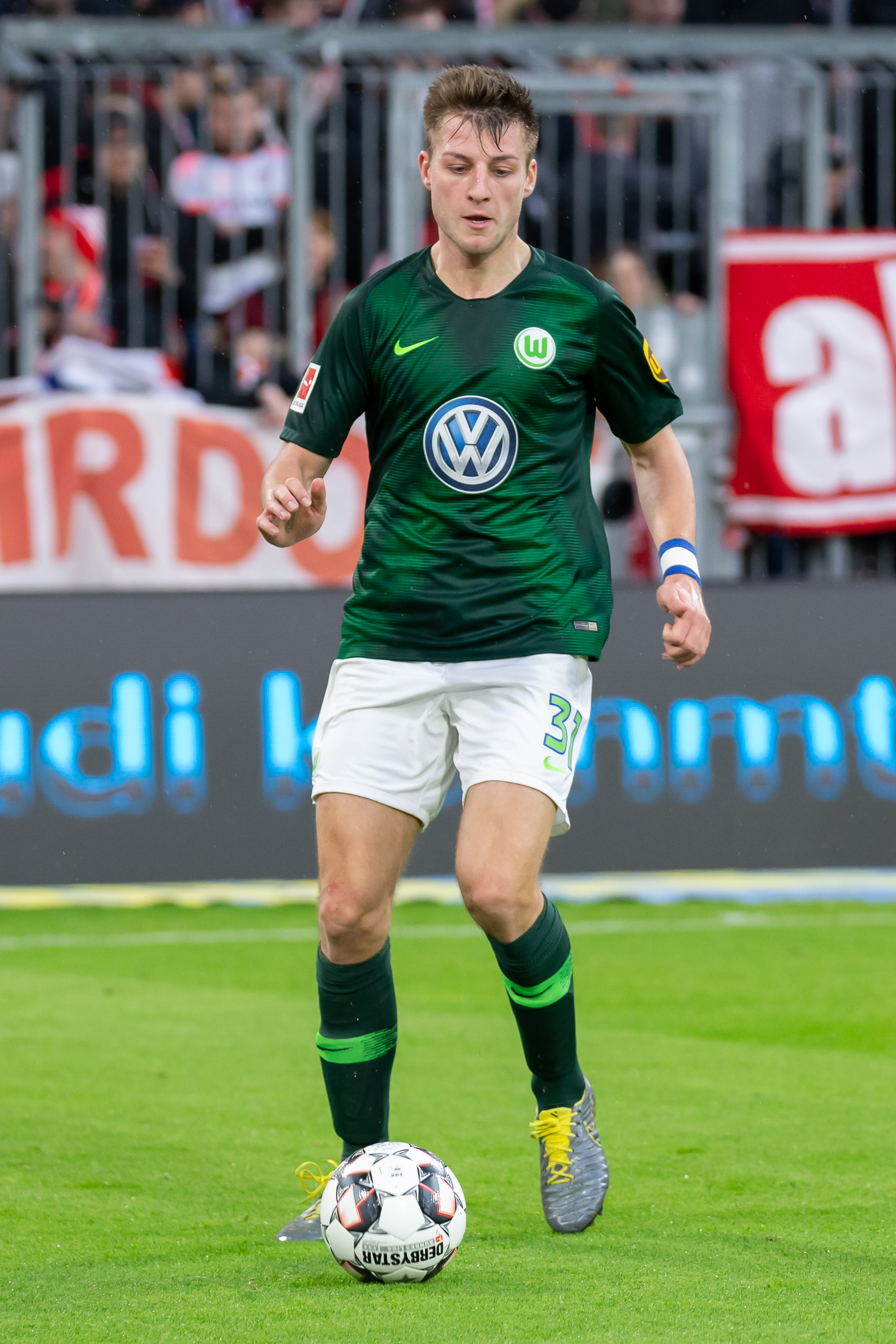
- Knoche for VfL Wolfsburg in 2019

Personal information
- Date of birth: 22 May 1992 (age 34)
- Place of birth: Braunschweig, Germany
- Height: 1.89 m (6 ft 2 in)
- Position: Centre-back

Youth career
- 1996–2002: Germania Lamme
- 2002–2005: Olympia Braunschweig
- 2005–2010: VfL Wolfsburg

Senior career*
Years	Team	Apps	(Gls)
2010–2015	VfL Wolfsburg II	69	(2)
2011–2020	VfL Wolfsburg	183	(12)
2020–2024	Union Berlin	123	(4)
2024–2026	1. FC Nürnberg	42	(2)
2026	Arminia Bielefeld	12	(2)

International career
2012–2013	Germany U20	6	(0)
2013–2015	Germany U21	10	(1)
- * Club domestic league appearances and goals as of 18 May 2026

Robin Knoche (born 22 May 1992) is a German professional footballer who plays as a centre-back. Knoche represented Germany youth teams from 2012 to 2015.

== Club career ==
=== Wolfsburg ===
Knoche is a product of VfL Wolfsburg's youth academy, first entering the club at the age of thirteen. Knoche made his senior first team debut in 2011 and was part of the squad that won the 2015 DFB-Pokal Final against Borussia Dortmund and the 2015 DFL-Supercup against Bayern Munich.

During the final relegation game of the 2018 Bundesliga season against Holstein Kiel on 21 May, Knoche scored a late header in the 75th minute off a corner kick to secure Wolfsburg's hopes of staying in the Bundesliga. Midway through the following season, in a 3–0 win over Mainz, Knoche scored Wolfsburg's 1100th goal in the Bundesliga.

=== Union Berlin ===
On 4 August 2020, Knoche signed for Union Berlin after his Wolfsburg contract expired at the end of the season. After securing survival on the last matchday, Union Berlin announced, on 20 May 2024 that Knoche will leave the club at the end of this season.

=== Nürnberg ===
On 19 July 2024, Knoche signed with 1. FC Nürnberg, moving to 2. Bundesliga after 13 seasons in the top tier.

=== Arminia Bielefed ===
On 30 January 2026, Knoche moved to Arminia Bielefeld.

== Career statistics ==
As of match played 18 May 2024

Appearances and goals by club, season and competition
Club	Season	League			DFB-Pokal		Europe		Other		Total	
Club	Season	Division	Apps	Goals	Apps	Goals	Apps	Goals	Apps	Goals	Apps	Goals
VfL Wolfsburg II	2010–11	Regionalliga Nord	24	0	—		—		—		24	0
VfL Wolfsburg II	2011–12	Regionalliga Nord	31	1	—		—		—		31	1
VfL Wolfsburg II	2012–13	Regionalliga Nord	13	1	—		—		—		13	1
VfL Wolfsburg II	2015–16	Regionalliga Nord	1	0	—		—		—		1	0
VfL Wolfsburg II	Total		69	2	—		—		—		69	2
VfL Wolfsburg	2011–12	Bundesliga	3	0	0	0	—		—		3	0
VfL Wolfsburg	2012–13	Bundesliga	11	0	2	0	—		—		13	0
VfL Wolfsburg	2013–14	Bundesliga	32	3	3	0	—		—		35	3
VfL Wolfsburg	2014–15	Bundesliga	27	2	3	0	11 (Note: Appearances in UEFA Europa League)	0	—		41	2
VfL Wolfsburg	2015–16	Bundesliga	11	1	0	0	2 (Note: Appearances in UEFA Champions League)	0	0	0	13	1
VfL Wolfsburg	2016–17	Bundesliga	23	1	2	0	—		2 (Note: Appearances in Bundesliga relegation play-offs)	0	27	1
VfL Wolfsburg	2017–18	Bundesliga	24	1	3	0	—		2	1	29	2
VfL Wolfsburg	2018–19	Bundesliga	31	3	3	0	—		—		34	3
VfL Wolfsburg	2019–20	Bundesliga	21	1	2	1	8	0	—		31	2
VfL Wolfsburg	Total		183	12	18	1	21	0	4	1	226	14
Union Berlin	2020–21	Bundesliga	34	1	2	0	—		—		36	1
Union Berlin	2021–22	Bundesliga	33	0	5	1	8 (Note: Appearances in UEFA Europa Conference League)	0	—		46	1
Union Berlin	2022–23	Bundesliga	32	2	4	1	10	4	—		46	7
Union Berlin	2023–24	Bundesliga	24	1	2	1	3 (Note: Appearances in UEFA Champions League)	0	—		29	2
Union Berlin	Total		123	4	13	3	21	4	—		157	11
Career total			375	18	31	4	42	4	4	1	452	27

== Honours ==
=== Club ===
VfL Wolfsburg

- DFB-Pokal: 2014–15
- DFL-Supercup: 2015
