= Yunus Mallı =

Footballer (born 1992)

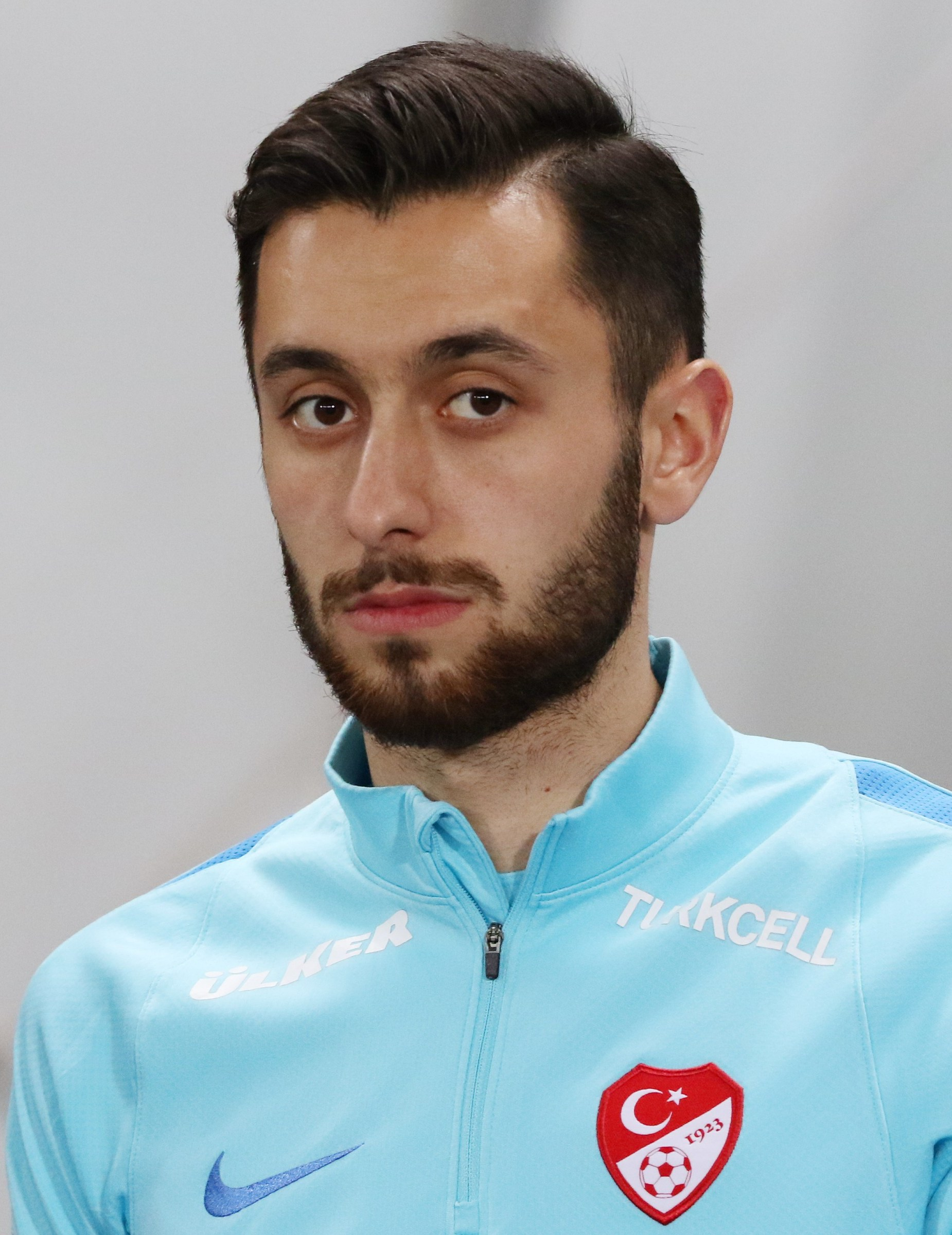
- Mallı with Turkey in 2016

Personal information
- Date of birth: 24 February 1992 (age 34)
- Place of birth: Kassel, Germany
- Height: 1.79 m (5 ft 10 in)
- Position: Attacking midfielder

Team information
- Current team: Mainz 05 II
- Number: 13

Youth career
- Sportfreunde Fasanenhof
- 2003–2007: VfL Kassel
- 2007–2011: Borussia Mönchengladbach

Senior career*
Years	Team	Apps	(Gls)
2010–2011	Borussia Mönchengladbach II	11	(2)
2011–2013	Mainz 05 II	22	(6)
2011–2017	Mainz 05	129	(29)
2017–2021	VfL Wolfsburg	73	(8)
2020	→ Union Berlin (loan)	13	(0)
2021–2022	Trabzonspor	20	(0)
2022–2023	Kasımpaşa	9	(0)
2023–2024	Konyaspor	14	(0)
2025–	Mainz 05 II	36	(10)

International career^{‡}
2008–2009	Germany U17	16	(1)
2009–2010	Germany U18	7	(2)
2010–2011	Germany U19	8	(1)
2012	Germany U20	1	(0)
2013–2015	Germany U21	11	(1)
2015–	Turkey	25	(1)
Medal record
Men's football
Representing Germany
UEFA European Under-17 Championship
Winner	2009 Germany
- * Club domestic league appearances and goals as of 24 September 2026 ‡ National team caps and goals as of 7 August 2020

Yunus Mallı (born 24 February 1992) is a professional footballer who plays as an attacking midfielder for Regionalliga Südwest club Mainz 05 II and the Turkey national team. Born in Germany, and a former German youth international, he plays for the Turkey national team.

== Club career ==
On 5 January 2017, Mallı joined VfL Wolfsburg after signing a 4 1/2-year deal.

In July 2022, Mallı signed with Kasımpaşa.

On 1 August 2023, he signed with the Süper Lig club Konyaspor.

On 1st September 2025, Mallı returned to Mainz to play for Mainz 05 II.

== International career ==
Mallı has 30 caps for Germany youth teams, including 11 for Germany U21. He made his debut on 11 November 2013, playing the second half in a win against Montenegro U21. On 6 November 2015, Mallı was selected for the Turkey national team to play friendlies against Qatar and Greece respectively. He was part of Euro 2016 squad of the Turkey national football team.

== Career statistics ==
As of 31 January 2021

Appearances and goals by club, season and competition
Club	Season	League			Cup		Continental		Other		Total	
Club	Season	Division	Apps	Goals	Apps	Goals	Apps	Goals	Apps	Goals	Apps	Goals
Borussia Mönchengladbach II	2010–11	Regionalliga	11	2	—		—		—		11	2
Mainz 05 II	2011–12	Regionalliga	8	5	—		—		—		8	5
Mainz 05 II	2012–13	Regionalliga	8	1	—		—		—		8	1
Mainz 05 II	2013–14	Regionalliga	6	0	—		—		—		6	0
Mainz 05 II	Total		22	6	—		—		—		22	6
Mainz 05	2011–12	Bundesliga	13	0	1	0	—		—		14	0
Mainz 05	2012–13	Bundesliga	14	1	1	1	—		—		15	2
Mainz 05	2013–14	Bundesliga	21	5	2	0	—		—		23	5
Mainz 05	2014–15	Bundesliga	31	6	1	0	2 (Note: Appearances in UEFA Europa League)	0	—		34	6
Mainz 05	2015–16	Bundesliga	34	11	2	0	—		—		36	1
Mainz 05	2016–17	Bundesliga	16	6	2	1	6	1	—		24	8
Mainz 05	Total		129	29	9	2	8	1	—		146	32
VfL Wolfsburg	2016–17	Bundesliga	16	1	1	0	—		2 (Note: Appearances in Relegation play-offs)	0	19	1
VfL Wolfsburg	2017–18	Bundesliga	31	5	4	0	—		2	1	37	6
VfL Wolfsburg	2018–19	Bundesliga	21	1	2	0	—		—		23	1
VfL Wolfsburg	2019–20	Bundesliga	0	0	0	0	2	0	—		2	0
VfL Wolfsburg	2020–21	Bundesliga	1	0	1	0	0	0	—		2	0
VfL Wolfsburg	Total		69	7	8	0	2	0	4	1	83	8
Union Berlin (loan)	2019–20	Bundesliga	13	0	0	0	—		—		13	0
Career total			244	44	17	2	10	1	4	1	275	48

=== International ===
As of 19 August 2020

Appearances and goals by national team and year
National team	Year	Apps	Goals
Turkey	2015	2	0
Turkey	2016	7	0
Turkey	2017	5	0
Turkey	2018	10	1
Turkey	2019	1	0
Total		25	1

Scores and results list Turkey's goal tally first, score column indicates score after each Mallı goal.

List of international goals scored by Yunus Mallı
No.	Date	Venue	Opponent	Score	Result	Competition
1	5 June 2018	VEB Arena, Moscow, Russia	Russia	1–1	1–1	Friendly

== Honors ==
Trabzonspor

- Süper Lig: 2021–22

Germany U17

- UEFA European Under-17 Championship: 2009
