= Yannick Gerhardt =

German footballer (born 1994)

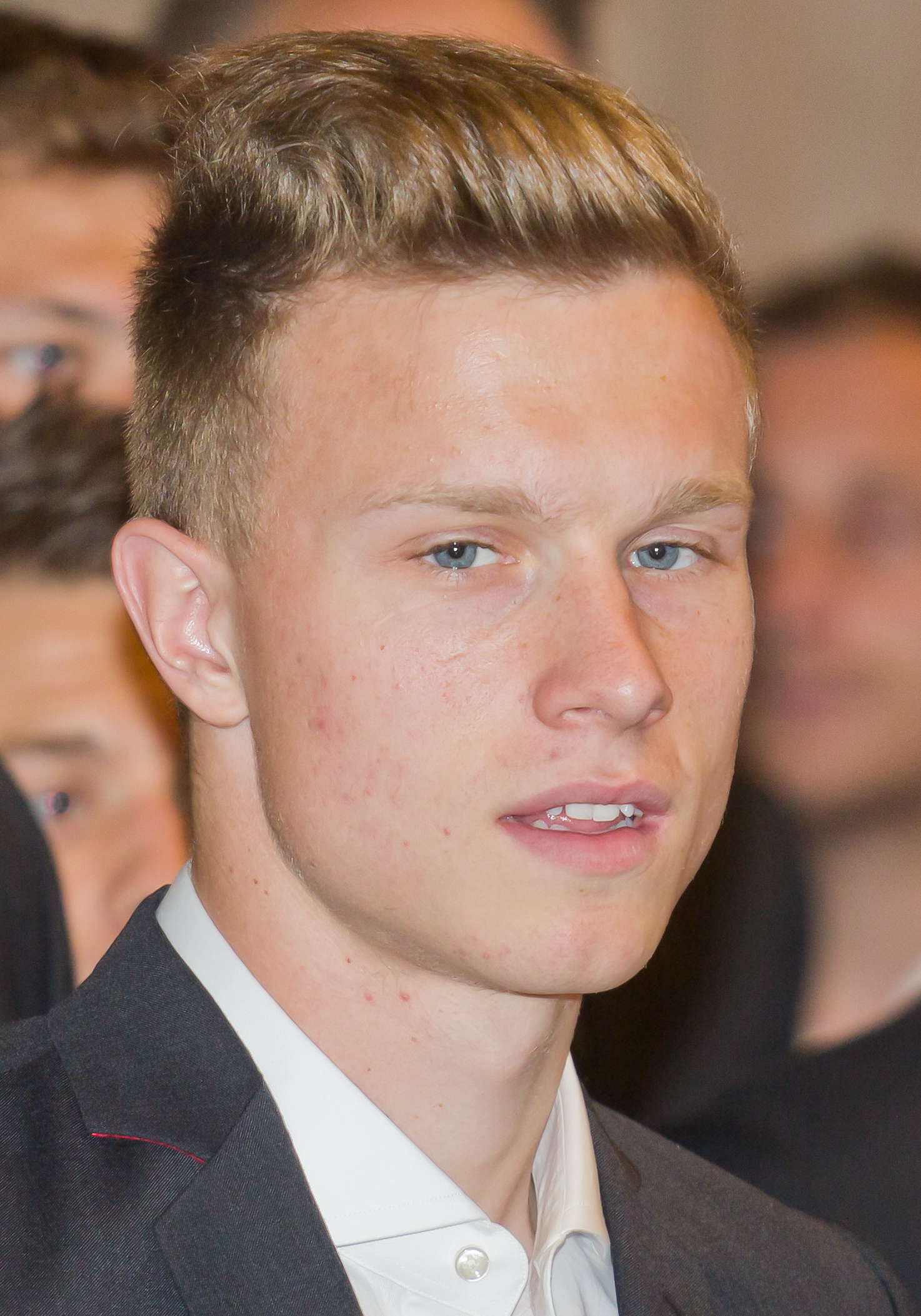
- Gerhardt in 2014

Personal information
- Date of birth: 13 March 1994 (age 32)
- Place of birth: Würselen, Germany
- Height: 1.84 m (6 ft 0 in)
- Position: Defensive midfielder

Team information
- Current team: VfL Wolfsburg
- Number: 31

Youth career
- SC Kreuzau
- 1. FC Köln

Senior career*
Years	Team	Apps	(Gls)
2013–2014	1. FC Köln II	13	(0)
2013–2016	1. FC Köln	74	(6)
2016–	VfL Wolfsburg	256	(18)

International career^{‡}
2012	Germany U18	2	(1)
2012–2013	Germany U19	13	(1)
2013–2014	Germany U20	15	(1)
2015–2017	Germany U21	17	(0)
2016	Germany	1	(0)
Medal record
UEFA European Under-21 Championship
Winner	2017
- * Club domestic league appearances and goals as of 20:26, 18 September 2026 (UTC) ‡ National team caps and goals as of 21:35, 30 June 2017 (UTC)

Yannick Gerhardt (born 13 March 1994) is a German footballer who plays as a defensive midfielder for 2. Bundesliga club VfL Wolfsburg. He has also represented the Germany national team.

== Club career ==
He made his professional debut on 20 July 2013 in a 2. Bundesliga match against Dynamo Dresden.

Gerhardt signed for Wolfsburg on 27 May 2016.

== International career ==
=== Senior ===
On 4 November 2016, Gerhardt was selected by Germany's head coach Joachim Löw for the world-cup qualifier against San Marino and the friendly against Italy. On 15 November, he had his debut match for the German team in the friendly against Italy.

== Personal life ==
Gerhardt's younger sister Anna plays for Turbine Potsdam and has been capped internationally at youth level.

== Career statistics ==
=== Club ===
As of match played 18 September 2026

Appearances and goals by club, season and competition
Club	Season	League			DFB-Pokal		Europe		Other		Total	
Club	Season	Division	Apps	Goals	Apps	Goals	Apps	Goals	Apps	Goals	Apps	Goals
1. FC Köln	2013–14	2. Bundesliga	29	3	2	0	—		—		31	3
1. FC Köln	2014–15	Bundesliga	16	1	1	0	—		—		17	1
1. FC Köln	2015–16	Bundesliga	29	2	1	0	—		—		30	2
1. FC Köln	Total		74	6	4	0	—		—		78	6
VfL Wolfsburg	2016–17	Bundesliga	27	0	3	0	—		2 (Note: Appearance(s) in Bundesliga relegation play-offs)	0	32	0
VfL Wolfsburg	2017–18	Bundesliga	17	1	4	0	—		—		21	1
VfL Wolfsburg	2018–19	Bundesliga	30	2	3	0	—		—		33	2
VfL Wolfsburg	2019–20	Bundesliga	18	2	2	1	5 (Note: Appearances in UEFA Europa League)	1	—		25	4
VfL Wolfsburg	2020–21	Bundesliga	29	2	4	2	2	0	—		35	4
VfL Wolfsburg	2021–22	Bundesliga	27	1	1	0	5 (Note: Appearances in UEFA Champions League)	0	—		33	1
VfL Wolfsburg	2022–23	Bundesliga	29	6	2	0	—		—		31	6
VfL Wolfsburg	2023–24	Bundesliga	25	2	3	1	—		—		28	3
VfL Wolfsburg	2024–25	Bundesliga	29	1	4	1	—		—		33	2
VfL Wolfsburg	2025–26	Bundesliga	19	1	1	0	—		1	0	21	1
VfL Wolfsburg	2026–27	2. Bundesliga	6	0	0	0	—		—		6	0
VfL Wolfsburg	Total		256	18	27	5	12	1	3	0	298	24
Career total			330	24	31	5	12	1	3	0	376	30

=== International ===
Appearances and goals by national team and year
National team	Year	Apps	Goals
Germany	2016	1	0
Total		1	0

== Honours ==
Germany U21

- UEFA European Under-21 Championship: 2017

Individual

- Fritz Walter Medal U19 Silver: 2013
- UEFA European Under-21 Championship Team of the Tournament: 2017
