= Ignacio Camacho =

Spanish professional footballer

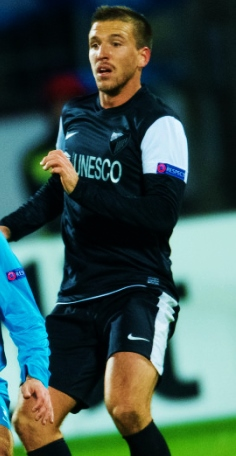
- Camacho in action for Málaga in 2012

Personal information
- Full name: Ignacio Camacho Barnola
- Date of birth: 4 May 1990 (age 36)
- Place of birth: Zaragoza, Spain
- Height: 1.82 m (6 ft 0 in)
- Position: Defensive midfielder

Youth career
- 2001–2005: Zaragoza
- 2005–2007: Atlético Madrid

Senior career*
Years	Team	Apps	(Gls)
2007–2008	Atlético Madrid B	12	(0)
2008–2011	Atlético Madrid	30	(2)
2011–2017	Málaga	177	(16)
2017–2020	VfL Wolfsburg	17	(0)
Total		236	(18)

International career
2005	Spain U15	1	(0)
2006–2007	Spain U17	25	(2)
2008–2009	Spain U19	14	(4)
2009	Spain U20	2	(0)
2008–2013	Spain U21	9	(0)
2014	Spain	1	(0)
Medal record
Men's football
Representing Spain
U-17 World Cup
Runner-up	2007 Korea
European U-21 Championship
Winner	2013 Israel
European U-17 Championship
Winner	2007 Belgium
- * Club domestic league appearances and goals

Ignacio Camacho Barnola (Spanish pronunciation: [iɣˈnaθjo kaˈmatʃo]; born 4 May 1990) is a Spanish former professional footballer who played as a defensive midfielder.

An academy graduate at Atlético Madrid, he made his senior debut at the age of 17. He spent the next three years at the club, making 50 appearances and winning Europa League and UEFA Super Cup titles. In 2011 he signed for Málaga, where he spent six and a half years and played nearly 200 official matches before joining Wolfsburg.

A full Spain international since 2014, Camacho previously earned 51 caps across the various youth levels for his nation, and was part of the sides which won the 2007 European Under-17 and 2013 European Under-21 Championships.

== Club career ==
=== Atlético Madrid ===
Camacho was born in Zaragoza, Aragon. Initially starting out at hometown club Real Zaragoza, he was spotted by Atlético Madrid and joined its academy. He made his first-team debut on 1 March 2008, starting, playing 68 minutes and being booked as the Colchoneros won 4–2 at home against FC Barcelona; he had just signed his first professional contract two months earlier.

On 3 May 2008, one day shy of his 18th birthday, Camacho scored his first La Liga goal, netting twice in another home victory, this time 3–0 over Recreativo de Huelva. After some excellent performances in his first season, he would however spend the following campaign restricted to Copa del Rey matches, with coach Javier Aguirre preferring Portuguese Maniche and new signing Éver Banega; this situation would slightly improve in late February 2009 as new coach Abel Resino had a run-in with Maniche, leaving him out of the squad for the remainder of the season.

=== Málaga ===
2009–10 did not provide Camacho with the needed opportunities to progress; when healthy, he was mainly utilised in injury time of games. The next season, he appeared even more rarely – no minutes in the league whatsoever – and, in late December 2010, was transferred to Málaga CF, with his teammate Sergio Asenjo also making the move in a loan deal.

Camacho scored his first official goal for Málaga on 29 April 2012, from a Jesús Gámez cross in the 1–0 home defeat of Valencia CF. He contributed 13 games and 811 minutes as the Andalusia team finished fourth and qualified to the UEFA Champions League for the first time ever.

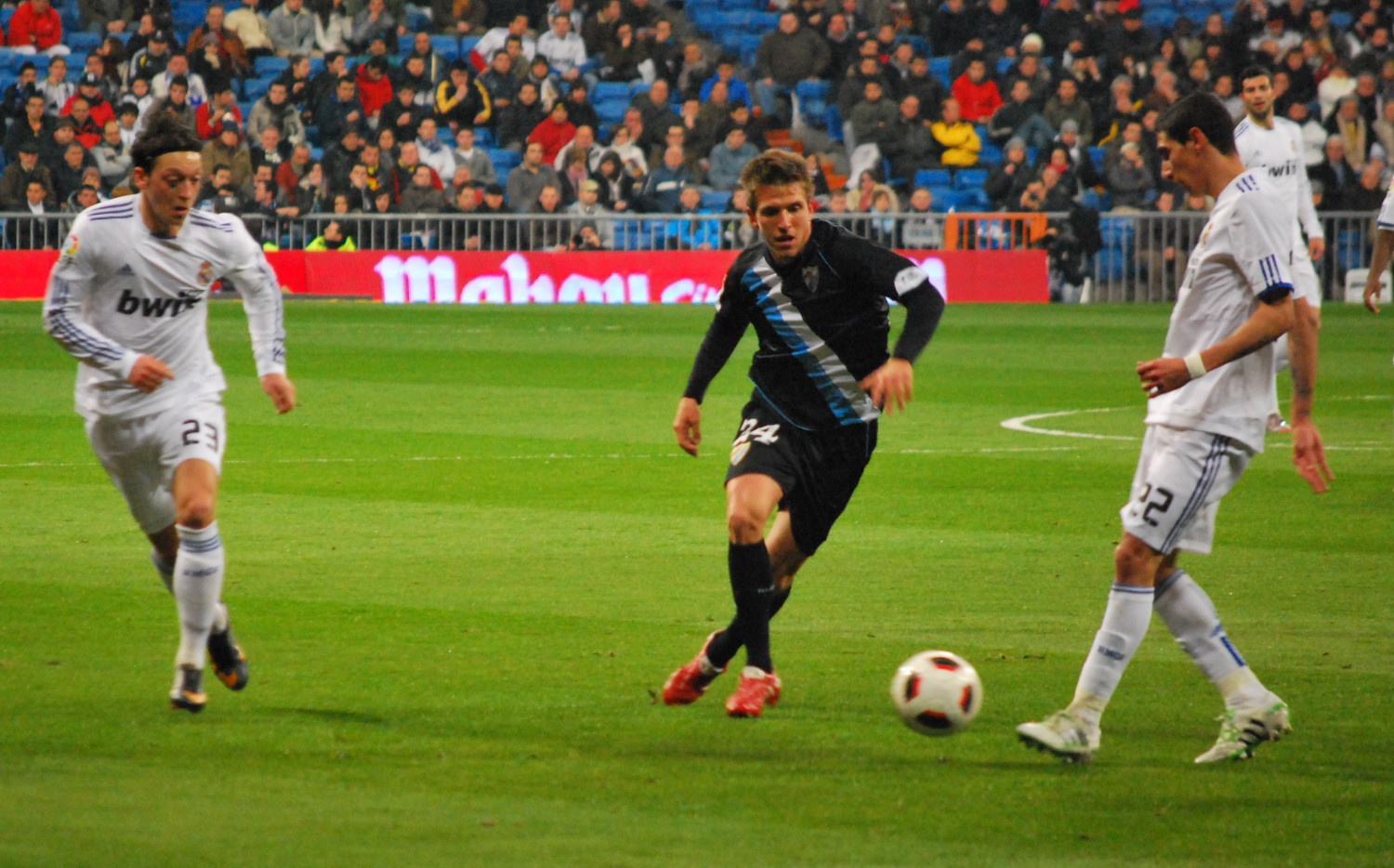
Camacho challenging for the ball with Ángel Di María of Real Madrid in 2011

In 2012–13, Camacho started regularly for the Manuel Pellegrini-led side. In January 2013, he was a central figure in two of the three fixtures between Málaga and Barcelona: on the 13th, his backpass turned into an assist for Lionel Messi for the first in an eventual 1–3 home loss. Three days later, he scored in the last minute to earn his team, by then reduced to ten men, a 2–2 draw at the Camp Nou in the quarter-finals of the domestic cup (6–4 aggregate defeat).

During his spell at the Estadio La Rosaleda, Camacho made 199 appearances in all competitions.

=== VfL Wolfsburg ===
On 8 July 2017, Camacho signed for VfL Wolfsburg for a reported fee of around €10 million. The following month, he was named as the club's captain behind Mario Gómez and Paul Verhaegh, and made his Bundesliga debut on 19 August by featuring the entire 0–3 home loss to Borussia Dortmund. A long-term ankle injury ruled him out for a large part of the campaign, but he returned in March 2018 as the permanent skipper after Gómez's departure to VfB Stuttgart two months prior.

Camacho announced his retirement in September 2020 at age 30, due to injuries. He underwent five surgeries in three years, but never fully recovered.

== International career ==
Camacho captained the Spain under-17 team to the title at the 2007 UEFA European Championship, scoring one goal during the tournament. He missed the 2009 European Under-19 Championships through injury.

On 7 November 2014, Camacho was called up to full side manager Vicente del Bosque's squad for matches against Belarus and Germany, He made his debut on the 18th against the latter, coming on as a half-time substitute for Sergio Busquets in an eventual 1–0 friendly loss in Vigo.

== Personal life ==
Camacho's father Juan José was also a footballer, as older brother Juanjo. The latter was also a midfielder, who played for several Segunda División and Segunda División B clubs.

== Career statistics ==
Appearances and goals by club, season and competition
Club	Season	League			Cup^{1}		Europe		Total	
Club	Season	Division	Apps	Goals	Apps	Goals	Apps	Goals	Apps	Goals
Atlético Madrid B	2007–08	Segunda División B	12	0	–		—		12	0
Atlético Madrid	2007–08	La Liga	10	2	1	0	—		11	2
Atlético Madrid	2008–09	La Liga	8	0	3	0	1	0	12	0
Atlético Madrid	2009–10	La Liga	12	0	3	0	7	0	22	0
Atlético Madrid	2010–11	La Liga	0	0	2	0	3	0	5	0
Atlético Madrid	Total		30	2	9	0	11	0	50	2
Málaga	2010–11	La Liga	15	0	1	0	—		16	0
Málaga	2011–12	La Liga	13	1	1	0	—		14	1
Málaga	2012–13	La Liga	33	2	4	1	11	0	48	3
Málaga	2013–14	La Liga	33	5	1	0	—		34	5
Málaga	2014–15	La Liga	25	2	3	2	—		28	4
Málaga	2015–16	La Liga	23	2	1	0	—		24	2
Málaga	2016–17	La Liga	35	4	0	0	—		35	4
Málaga	Total		177	16	11	3	11	0	199	19
VfL Wolfsburg	2017–18	Bundesliga	11	0	4	1	0	0	15	1
VfL Wolfsburg	2018–19	Bundesliga	6	0	0	0	0	0	6	0
VfL Wolfsburg	2019–20	Bundesliga	0	0	0	0	0	0	0	0
VfL Wolfsburg	Total		17	0	4	1	0	0	21	1
Career total			236	18	24	4	22	0	282	22

^{1} Includes Copa del Rey, DFB-Pokal and Bundesliga relegation play-offs

== Honours ==
Atlético Madrid

- UEFA Europa League: 2009–10
- UEFA Super Cup: 2010
- Copa del Rey runner-up: 2009–10

Spain U17

- UEFA European Under-17 Championship: 2007
- FIFA U-17 World Cup runner-up: 2007

Spain U21

- UEFA European Under-21 Championship: 2013
