= Daniel Didavi =

German footballer

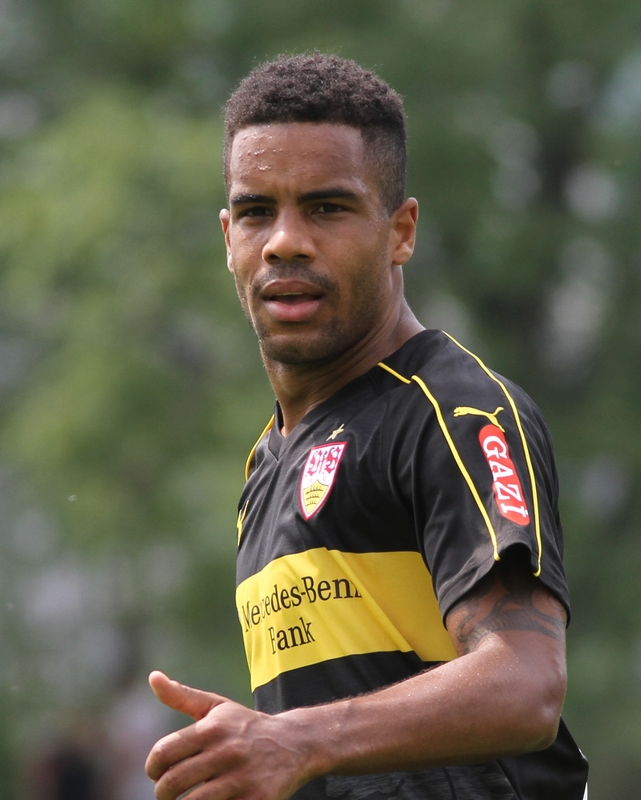
- Didavi with VfB Stuttgart in 2018

Personal information
- Date of birth: 21 February 1990 (age 36)
- Place of birth: Nürtingen, West Germany
- Height: 1.79 m (5 ft 10 in)
- Position: Attacking midfielder

Youth career
- SPV 05 Nürtingen
- 1997–2002: VfB Stuttgart
- 2002–2003: SPV 05 Nürtingen
- 2003–2008: VfB Stuttgart

Senior career*
Years	Team	Apps	(Gls)
2008–2015	VfB Stuttgart II	65	(10)
2009–2016	VfB Stuttgart	60	(18)
2011–2012	→ 1. FC Nürnberg (loan)	23	(9)
2016–2018	VfL Wolfsburg	48	(13)
2018–2022	VfB Stuttgart	72	(12)
Total		268	(62)

International career
2007	Germany U17	1	(0)
2008	Germany U18	1	(0)
2010	Germany U20	1	(0)
2011	Germany U21	5	(1)
- * Club domestic league appearances and goals

Daniel Didavi (born 21 February 1990) is a German former professional footballer who played as an attacking midfielder.

== Club career ==
Didavi started his career with SpV 05 Nürtingen. He was scouted in summer 2003 by VfB Stuttgart, and he was promoted to the first team in July 2009.

In July 2011, he was loaned out to 1. FC Nürnberg until the end of the season, where he became known as a midfielder with an eye for the goal, scoring 8 goals in the second half of the season.

On 2 July 2012, Didavi extended his contract with VfB Stuttgart until June 2016. In the years 2012 to 2015 Didavi was repeatedly thrown back by injuries. However, he would support his team crucially in the relegation battles of the closing stages of the Bundesliga seasons 2013–14 and 2014–15.

On 5 April 2016, VfL Wolfsburg announced the signing of Didavi on a contract until 2021, at the end of the 2015–16 Bundesliga campaign.

On 29 June 2018, Didavi signed a three-year contract with VfB Stuttgart, enabling him to return to his former club on 1 July 2018.

He was released upon his contract expiry in 2022.

== International career ==
Didavi was a member of the German youth national teams at the U18, U19, U20 and U21 levels.

== Personal life ==
Didavi's mother is German, while his father is from Benin.

== Career statistics ==
As of match played 20 November 2021

Appearances and goals by club, season and competition
Club	Season	League			Cup		Continental		Other		Total		Ref.
Club	Season	Division	Apps	Goals	Apps	Goals	Apps	Goals	Apps	Goals	Apps	Goals	Ref.
VfB Stuttgart II	2008–09	3. Liga	30	5	—		—		—		30	5	
VfB Stuttgart II	2009–10	3. Liga	28	5	—		—		—		28	5	
VfB Stuttgart II	2010–11	3. Liga	2	0	—		—		—		2	0	
VfB Stuttgart II	2012–13	3. Liga	1	0	—		—		—		1	0	
VfB Stuttgart II	2013–14	3. Liga	2	0	—		—		—		2	0	
VfB Stuttgart II	2014–15	3. Liga	2	1	—		—		—		2	1	
VfB Stuttgart II	Total		65	10	0	0	0	0	0	0	65	10	—
VfB Stuttgart	2010–11	Bundesliga	8	0	0	0	5	0	—		13	0	
VfB Stuttgart	2012–13	Bundesliga	3	0	1	0	—		—		4	0	
VfB Stuttgart	2013–14	Bundesliga	7	1	0	0	—		—		7	1	
VfB Stuttgart	2014–15	Bundesliga	11	4	1	0	—		—		12	4	
VfB Stuttgart	2015–16	Bundesliga	31	13	3	1	—		—		34	14	
VfB Stuttgart	Total		60	18	5	1	5	0	0	0	70	19	—
1. FC Nürnberg (loan)	2011–12	Bundesliga	23	9	2	0	—		—		25	9	
1. FC Nürnberg II (loan)	2011–12	Regionalliga Süd	2	0	—		—		—		2	0	
VfL Wolfsburg	2016–17	Bundesliga	18	4	2	0	—		2 (Note: Appearances in Bundesliga relegation play-offs)	0	22	4	
VfL Wolfsburg	2017–18	Bundesliga	30	9	3	1	—		0	0	33	10	
VfL Wolfsburg	Total		48	13	5	1	0	0	2	0	55	14	—
VfB Stuttgart	2018–19	Bundesliga	20	2	1	0	—		2	0	23	2	
VfB Stuttgart	2019–20	2. Bundesliga	19	6	2	0	—		—		21	6	
VfB Stuttgart	2020–21	Bundesliga	23	4	3	0	—		—		26	4	
VfB Stuttgart	2021–22	Bundesliga	10	0	2	0	—		—		12	0	
VfB Stuttgart	Total		72	12	8	0	0	0	2	0	82	12	—
Career total			270	62	20	2	5	0	4	0	299	64	—

== Honours ==
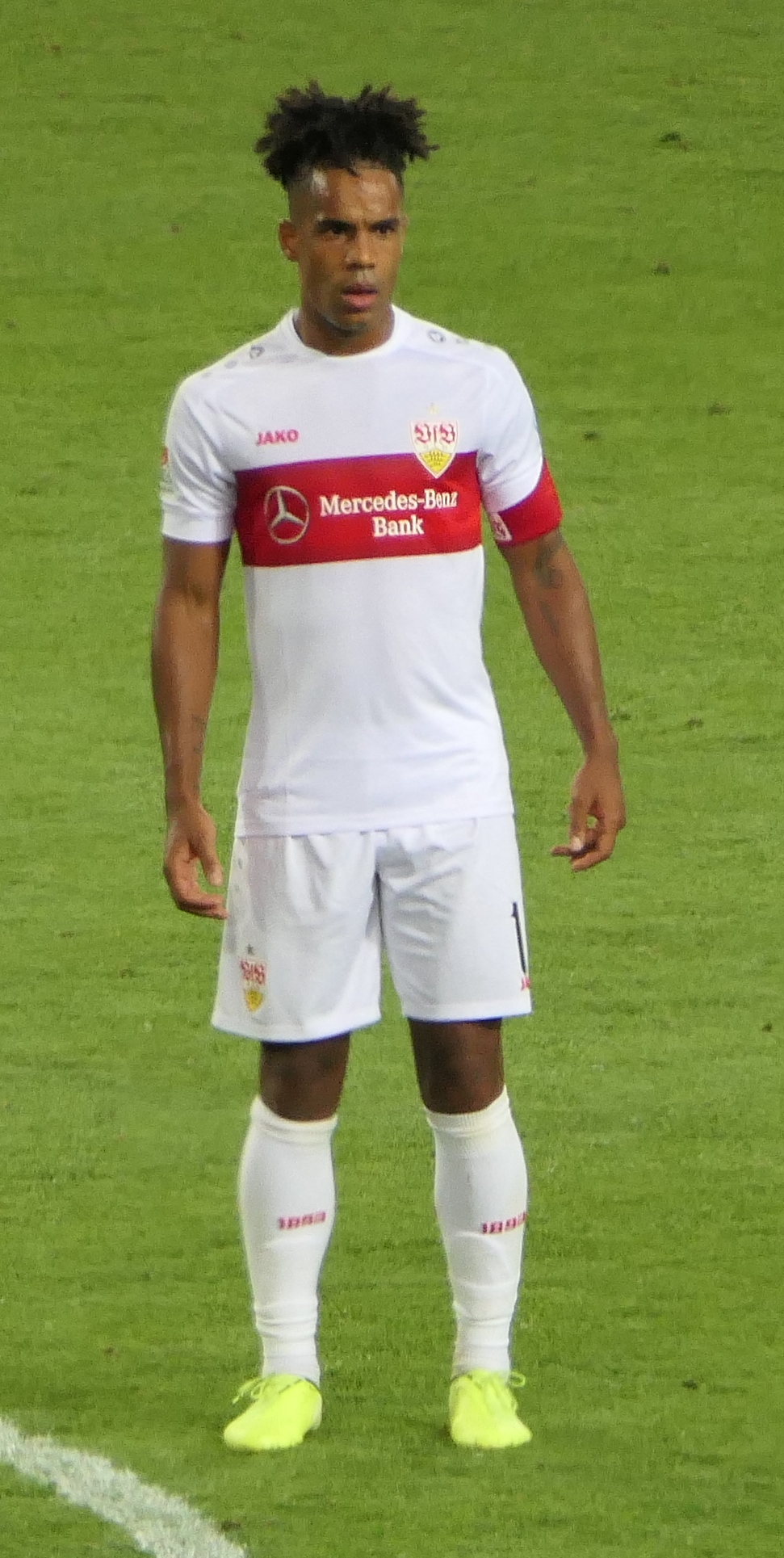
Didavi with Stuttgart in 2019

VfB Stuttgart

- DFB-Pokal runner-up: 2012–13
