= Phillip Menzel =

German footballer (born 1998)

Personal information
- Date of birth: 18 August 1998 (age 28)
- Place of birth: Kiel, Germany
- Height: 1.92 m (6 ft 4 in)
- Position: Goalkeeper

Youth career
- –2014: Holstein Kiel
- 2014–2017: VfL Wolfsburg

Senior career*
Years	Team	Apps	(Gls)
2016–2020	VfL Wolfsburg	0	(0)
2017–2020	VfL Wolfsburg II	50	(0)
2020–2024	Austria Klagenfurt	113	(0)
2024–2026	1. FC Saarbrücken	74	(0)

International career^{‡}
2015–2016	Germany U18	4	(0)
2016–2017	Germany U19	2	(0)
2018	Germany U20	1	(0)
- * Club domestic league appearances and goals as of 30 May 2026 ‡ National team caps and goals as of 10:59, 4 October 2020 (UTC)

Phillip Menzel (born 18 August 1998) is a German professional footballer who plays as a goalkeeper.

== Career ==
Menzel signed his first professional contract with VfL Wolfsburg in 2016. In mid-2020, he moved to Austrian club Austria Klagenfurt. Menzel made his professional debut for Klagenfurt in the Austrian Football Second League on 4 October 2020, starting in the home match against Floridsdorfer AC, which finished as a 5–0 win.

On 9 May 2024, Menzel signed with 1. FC Saarbrücken in 3. Liga.

== Career statistics ==
As of match played 19 May 2024

Appearances and goals by club, season and competition
Club	Season	League			National cup		Europe		Other		Total	
Club	Season	Division	Apps	Goals	Apps	Goals	Apps	Goals	Apps	Goals	Apps	Goals
VfL Wolfsburg	2018–19	Bundesliga	0	0	0	0	—		—		0	0
VfL Wolfsburg	2019–20	Bundesliga	0	0	0	0	0	0	—		0	0
VfL Wolfsburg	Total		0	0	0	0	0	0	—		0	0
VfL Wolfsburg II	2015–16	Regionalliga Nord	0	0	—		—		—		0	0
VfL Wolfsburg II	2017–18	Regionalliga Nord	21	0	—		—		—		21	0
VfL Wolfsburg II	2018–19	Regionalliga Nord	23	0	—		—		—		23	0
VfL Wolfsburg II	2019–20	Regionalliga Nord	8	0	—		—		—		8	0
VfL Wolfsburg II	Total		52	0	—		—		—		52	0
Austria Klagenfurt	2020–21	Austrian Second League	24	0	2	0	—		2	0	28	0
Austria Klagenfurt	2021–22	Austrian Bundesliga	28	0	2	0	—		—		30	0
Austria Klagenfurt	2022–23	Austrian Bundesliga	30	0	1	0	—		—		31	0
Austria Klagenfurt	2023–24	Austrian Bundesliga	31	0	2	0	—		—		33	0
Austria Klagenfurt	Total		113	0	7	0	—		2	0	122	0
Career total			165	0	7	0	0	0	2	0	174	0
