= Niklas Kastenhofer =

German footballer

Personal information
- Date of birth: 8 January 1999 (age 27)
- Place of birth: Halle, Germany
- Height: 1.85 m (6 ft 1 in)
- Position: Centre-back

Team information
- Current team: Hallescher FC
- Number: 3

Youth career
- –2015: Hallescher FC
- 2015–2016: Carl Zeiss Jena
- 2017–2018: Hallescher FC

Senior career*
| Years | Team | Apps | (Gls) |
| 2018–2022 | Hallescher FC | 48 | (1) |
| 2022–2024 | VfB Lübeck | 31 | (1) |
| 2024–2025 | Hallescher FC | 10 | (0) |
| 2025–2026 | SV Babelsberg 03 | 16 | (0) |
| 2026– | Hallescher FC | 1 | (0) |
- * Club domestic league appearances and goals as of 23 September 2026

Niklas Kastenhofer (born 8 January 1999) is a German professional footballer who plays as a centre-back for Hallescher FC.

== Career ==
Kastenhofer made his professional debut for Hallescher FC in the 3. Liga on 24 November 2018, coming on as a substitute in the 81st minute for Tobias Schilk in the 2–0 home win against Sonnenhof Großaspach.
