= Gian-Luca Itter =

German footballer

Personal information
- Full name: Gian-Luca Itter
- Date of birth: 5 January 1999 (age 27)
- Place of birth: Giessen, Germany
- Height: 1.84 m (6 ft 0 in)
- Position: Left back

Team information
- Current team: Greuther Fürth
- Number: 27

Youth career
- FC Cleeberg
- 2011–2014: Eintracht Frankfurt
- 2015–2017: VfL Wolfsburg

Senior career*
Years	Team	Apps	(Gls)
2017–2019	VfL Wolfsburg II	19	(1)
2017–2019	VfL Wolfsburg	7	(0)
2019–2021	SC Freiburg II	10	(0)
2019–2022	SC Freiburg	3	(0)
2021–2022	→ Greuther Fürth (loan)	32	(0)
2022–	Greuther Fürth	83	(1)

International career^{‡}
2013	Germany U15	1	(0)
2014–2015	Germany U16	7	(0)
2015–2016	Germany U17	15	(0)
2017–2018	Germany U19	5	(0)
2018–2019	Germany U20	9	(1)
- * Club domestic league appearances and goals as of 18 May 2026 ‡ National team caps and goals as of 20:35, 5 July 2021 (UTC)

Gian-Luca Itter (born 5 January 1999), commonly known as Luca Itter, is a German professional footballer who plays as a left-back for 2. Bundesliga club Greuther Fürth.

== Career ==
On 27 May 2019, VfL Wolfsburg announced that Itter would be joining SC Freiburg for the upcoming season. On June 3, 2022, Freiburg announced that Itter would join Greuther Fürth on a permanent basis.

== Personal life ==
He is the twin brother of fellow professional footballer Davide Itter.

== Career statistics ==
As of matches played on 22 May 2018

Club	Season	League			Cup		Total	
Club	Season	Division	Apps	Goals	Apps	Goals	Apps	Goals
VfL Wolfsburg	2017–18	Bundesliga	5	0	0	0	5	0
VfL Wolfsburg	2018–19	Bundesliga	2	0	0	0	2	0
VfL Wolfsburg	Total		7	0	0	0	7	0
VfL Wolfsburg II	2017–18	Regionalliga Nord	3	1	—		3	1
VfL Wolfsburg II	2017–18	Regionalliga Nord	16	0	—		16	0
VfL Wolfsburg II	Total		19	1	0	0	19	1
SC Freiburg II	2019–20	Regionalliga Südwest	8	0	—		8	0
SC Freiburg II	2020–21	Regionalliga Südwest	2	0	—		2	0
SC Freiburg II	Total		10	0	0	0	10	0
SC Freiburg	2019–20	Bundesliga	3	0	0	0	3	0
Greuther Fürth (loan)	2020–21	2. Bundesliga	8	0	1	0	9	0
Career total			47	1	1	0	48	1

== Honours ==
Individual

- Fritz Walter Medal U17 Gold: 2016
