= Benjamin Cortus =

German football referee

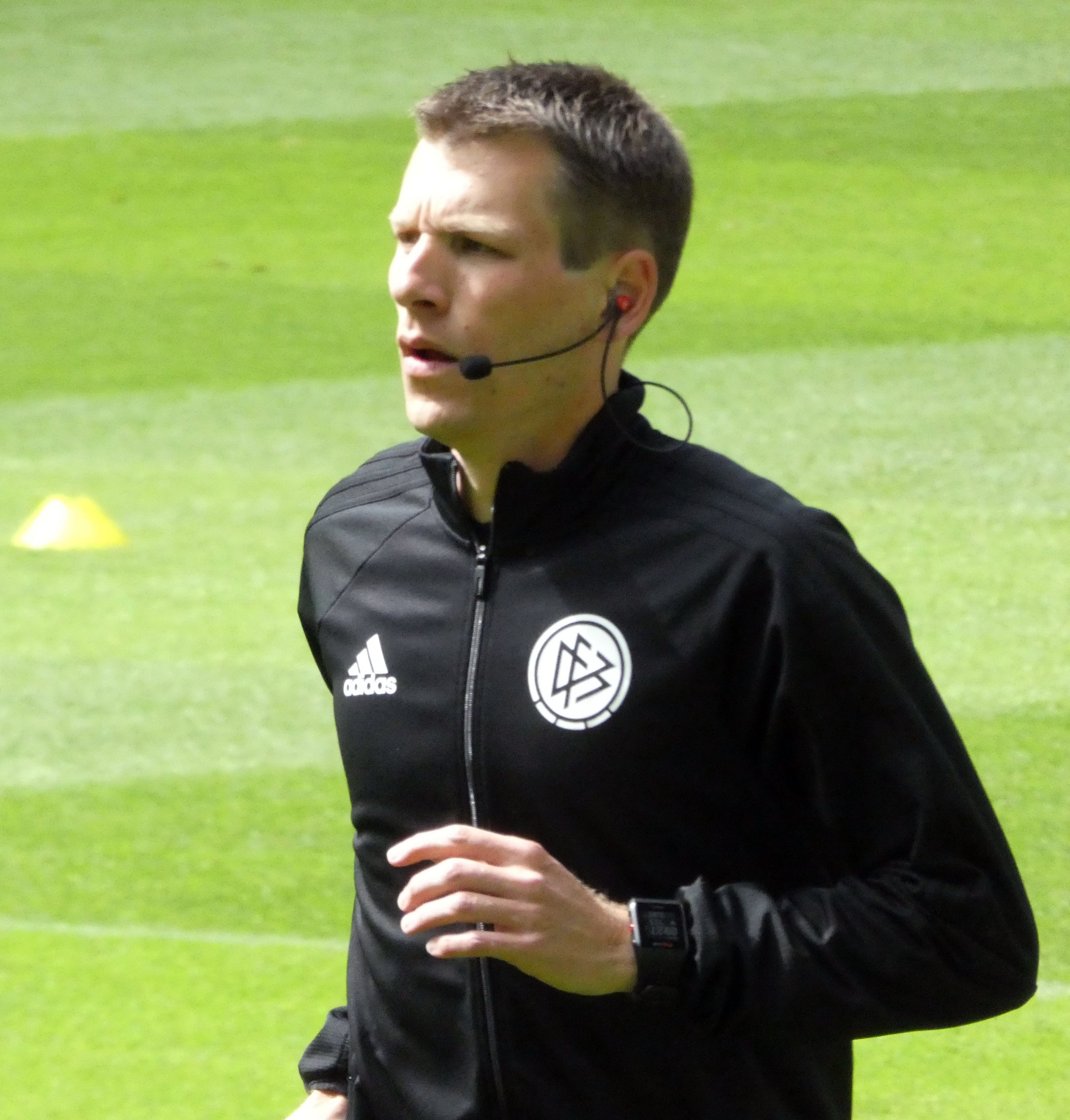
- Cortus in 2019
- Born: 13 December 1981 (age 44); Nuremberg, West Germany
- Other occupation: IT management assistant

Domestic
Years	League	Role
2009–	DFB	Referee
2011–	2. Bundesliga	Referee
2016–2023	Bundesliga	Referee

Benjamin Cortus (born 13 December 1981) is a German football referee who is based in Röthenbach. He referees for TSV Burgfarrnbach of the Bavarian Football Association.

== Refereeing career ==
Cortus officiates for TSV Burgfarrnbach, and has been on the DFB level since 2009. In 2011, he was appointed as a 2. Bundesliga referee. In the summer of 2016, Cortus was one of four referees promoted to officiate in the Bundesliga.

== Personal life ==
Cortus is an IT management assistant by trade, and currently resides in Röthenbach.
