= 2022–23 VfL Wolfsburg season =

VfL Wolfsburg
2022–23 season
- Owner: Volkswagen AG (of GmbH)
- Executive Director: Frank Witter
- Manager: Niko Kovač
- Stadium: Volkswagen Arena
- Bundesliga: 8th
- DFB-Pokal: Round of 16
- Top goalscorer: League: Yannick Gerhardt; Jonas Wind (6 each); All: Yannick Gerhardt; Omar Marmoush; Jonas Wind (6 each)
Home colours	Away colours	Third colours

The 2022–23 season was the 78th season in the existence of VfL Wolfsburg and the club's 26th consecutive season in the top flight of German football. In addition to the domestic league, VfL Wolfsburg participated in this season's editions of the DFB-Pokal. The season covers the period from 1 July 2022 to 30 June 2023.

== Players ==
=== First-team squad ===
As of 28 January 2023

Note: Flags indicate national team as defined under FIFA eligibility rules; some limited exceptions apply. Players may hold more than one non-FIFA nationality.

No.	Pos.	Nation	Player
1	GK	BEL	Koen Casteels (vice-captain)
2	DF	GER	Kilian Fischer
3	DF	BEL	Sebastiaan Bornauw
4	DF	FRA	Maxence Lacroix
5	DF	NED	Micky van de Ven
6	DF	BRA	Paulo Otávio
7	FW	GER	Luca Waldschmidt
8	DF	FRA	Nicolas Cozza
10	FW	GER	Lukas Nmecha
12	GK	AUT	Pavao Pervan
16	MF	POL	Jakub Kamiński
18	FW	GER	Dzenan Pejcinovic
20	MF	GER	Ridle Baku

No.	Pos.	Nation	Player
22	MF	GER	Felix Nmecha
23	FW	DEN	Jonas Wind
27	MF	GER	Maximilian Arnold (captain)
29	MF	FRA	Josuha Guilavogui
30	GK	GER	Niklas Klinger
31	MF	GER	Yannick Gerhardt
32	MF	SWE	Mattias Svanberg
33	FW	EGY	Omar Marmoush
35	GK	GER	Philipp Schulze
36	MF	CZE	Lukáš Ambros
38	MF	CRO	Bartol Franjić
39	FW	AUT	Patrick Wimmer
40	MF	USA	Kevin Paredes
42	DF	GER	Felix Lange

=== Players out on loan ===
Note: Flags indicate national team as defined under FIFA eligibility rules; some limited exceptions apply. Players may hold more than one non-FIFA nationality.

No.	Pos.	Nation	Player
—	MF	USA	Bryang Kayo (on loan at Nürnberg II until 30 June 2023)
8	MF	BEL	Aster Vranckx (on loan at AC Milan until 30 June 2023)
17	FW	GER	Maximilian Philipp (on loan at Werder Bremen until 30 June 2023)
18	DF	IRL	Anselmo García MacNulty (on loan at NAC Breda until 30 June 2023)
21	FW	POL	Bartosz Białek (on loan at Vitesse until 30 June 2023)

No.	Pos.	Nation	Player
26	FW	USA	Ulysses Llanez (on loan at SKN St. Pölten until 30 June 2023)
34	DF	CRO	Marin Pongračić (on loan at U.S. Lecce until 30 June 2023)
39	DF	GER	Tim Siersleben (on loan at 1. FC Heidenheim until 30 June 2023)
49	MF	ESP	Fabio Di Michele Sanchez (on loan at NAC Breda until 30 June 2023)

== Transfers ==
=== In ===
No.	Pos	Player	Transferred from	Fee	Date	Source
14	MF	(Croatia) Josip Brekalo	(Italy) Torino	Loan Return	30 June 2022	
34	DF	(Croatia) Marin Pongračić	(Germany) Borussia Dortmund	Loan return	30 June 2022	
33	FW	(Egypt) Omar Marmoush	(Germany) VfB Stuttgart	Loan return	30 June 2022	
37	MF	(Germany) Elvis Rexhbeçaj	(Germany) Vfl Bochum	Loan return	30 June 2022	
29	MF	(France) Joshua Guilavogui	(France) Bordeaux	Loan return	30 June 2022	
45	GK	(Germany) Lino Kasten	(Austria) St. Pölten	Loan return	30 June 2022	
2	DF	(Germany) Kilian Fischer	(Germany) 1. FC Nürnberg	€2,500,000	1 July 2022	
16	FW	(Poland) Jakub Kamiński	(Poland) Lech Poznań	€10,000,000	1 July 2022	
39	MF	(Austria) Patrick Wimmer	(Germany) Arminia Bielefeld	€5,000,000	1 July 2022	
38	MF	(Croatia) Bartol Franjić	(Croatia) Dinamo Zagreb	€7,500,000	1 July 2022	
18	FW	(Germany) Dženan Pejčinović	(Germany) FC Augsburg U19	€1,250,000	14 July 2022	
32	MF	(Sweden) Mattias Svanberg	(Italy) Bologna	€9,000,000	16 July 2022	
8	DF	(France) Nicolas Cozza	(France) Montpellier	€500,000	25 January 2023	

=== Out ===
No.	Pos	Player	Transferred to	Fee	Date	Source
28	FW	(Belgium) Dodi Lukebakio	(Germany) Hertha BSC	Loan return	30 June 2022	
2	DF	(Brazil) William	Free transfer		1 July 2022	
24	MF	(Austria) Xaver Schlager	(Germany) RB Leipzig	€12,000,000	1 July 2022	
25	DF	(United States) John Brooks	(Portugal) Benfica	Free transfer	1 July 2022	
18	DF	(Republic of Ireland) Anselmo Garcia MacNulty	(Netherlands) NAC Breda	Loan	19 July 2022	
49	MF	(Spain) Fabio Di Michele Sanchez	(Netherlands) NAC Breda	Loan	19 July 2022	
19	DF	(Switzerland) Kevin Mbabu	(England) Fulham	€7,000,000	27 July 2022	
37	MF	(Germany) Elvis Rexhbeçaj	(Germany) FC Augsburg	€1,700,000	27 July 2022	
34	DF	(Croatia) Marin Pongračić	(Italy) Lecce	Loan (Note: Includes an option to sign permanently.)	22 August 2022	
21	FW	(Poland) Bartosz Białek	(Netherlands) Vitesse	Loan	29 August 2022	
11	MF	(Switzerland) Renato Steffen	(Switzerland) FC Lugano	€750,000	30 August 2022	
8	MF	(Belgium) Aster Vranckx	(Italy) AC Milan	Loan (Note: Includes an option to sign permanently.)	1 September 2022	
45	GK	(Germany) Lino Kasten	Contract termination		1 September 2022	
9	FW	(Germany) Max Kruse	Contract termination		28 November 2022	
15	DF	(France) Jérôme Roussillon	(Germany) Union Berlin	Undisclosed	12 January 2023	
14	MF	(Croatia) Josip Brekalo	(Italy) Fiorentina	Undisclosed	28 January 2023	
17	FW	(Germany) Maximilian Philipp	(Germany) Werder Bremen	Loan	30 January 2023	

== Pre-season and friendlies ==
Win Draw Loss Fixtures

25 June 2022 Friendly	VfL Wolfsburg	9–1	Veltins XI	Wolfsburg, Germany
18:00	Lange 8'; Paredes 24'; Berkemer 31'; Arnold 33'; Waldschmidt 53', 57', 66', 85'; Baku 77'	Report	Helms 64'	Stadium: Sportzentrum Fallersleben; Attendance: 1,850

2 July 2022 Volkswagen Cup	VfL Osnabrück	3–1	VfL Wolfsburg	Osnabrück, Germany
14:00	Higl 9', 32'; Tesche 25'	Report	Waldschmidt 36'	Stadium: Bremer Brücke; Attendance: 5,712
Note: Match was one half of 45 minutes.

2 July 2022 Volkswagen Cup	VfL Wolfsburg	1–1	Hannover 96	Osnabrück, Germany
15:00	Bornauw 25'	Report	Weydandt 4'	Stadium: Bremer Brücke; Attendance: 5,712
Note: Match was one half of 45 minutes.

9 July 2022 Friendly	WSG Tirol	1–7	VfL Wolfsburg	Wattens, Austria
17:30	Prica 26'	Report	Waldschmidt 14', 32'; Philipp 16'; Rexhbeçaj 60'; Wind 72'; Steffen 75', 79'	Stadium: Gernot Langes Stadion

16 July 2022 Friendly	Mechelen	3–4	VfL Wolfsburg	Alkmaar, Netherlands
16:00	Shved 43'; Hernandez 57'; Vanlerberghe (yellow card) 70'; Hairemans 78'	Report	L. Nmecha 9'; Waldschmidt 11'; Marmoush 33'; Baku 36'	Stadium: AFAS Stadion

23 July 2022 Friendly	VfL Wolfsburg	4–0	Brentford	Wolfsburg, Germany
16:00	Wimmer 27'; Bornauw 56'; Wind 66'; Kamiński 86'	Report		Stadium: AOK Stadion; Attendance: 3,512; Referee: Felix Bickel (Germany)

31 July 2022 Friendly	VfL Wolfsburg	3–1	Hessen Kassel	Wolfsburg, Germany
11:00				Stadium: AOK Stadion

22 September 2022 Friendly	VfL Wolfsburg	0–0	Hansa Rostock	Wolfsburg, Germany
13:00 CEST (UTC+2)				Stadium: AOK Stadion; Attendance: 0

10 December 2022 Friendly	VfL Wolfsburg	1–1	Nordsjælland	Wolfsburg, Germany
13:00 CET (UTC+1)	Svanberg 28'	Report	Nygren 78'	Stadium: Volkswagen Arena; Referee: Felix Bickel (Germany)

17 December 2022 Friendly	Brentford	2–2	VfL Wolfsburg	Brentford, England
15:00 GMT (UTC±0)	Mbeumo 21'; Toney 37'	Report	Waldschmidt 13'; Pejčinović 67'	Stadium: Brentford Community Stadium

6 January 2023 Friendly	1899 Hoffenheim	2–3	VfL Wolfsburg	Almancil, Portugal
15:30 CET (UTC+1)	Skov 30', 73'	Report	Waldschmidt 42'; Paredes 72'; Kamiński 87'	Stadium: Estádio Municipal de Almancil

14 January 2023 Friendly	FC Augsburg	0–4	VfL Wolfsburg	Augsburg, Germany
13:00 CET (UTC+1)		Report	Ambros 10'; L. Nmecha 12'; Baku 49', 55'	Stadium: FCA-Trainingsgelände

14 January 2023 Friendly	FC Augsburg	1–0	VfL Wolfsburg	Augsburg, Germany
15:00 CET (UTC+1)	Vargas 73'	Report	Arnold (penalty missed) 90+3'	Stadium: FCA-Trainingsgelände

== Competitions ==
=== Overall record ===
Competition	First match	Last match	Starting round	Final position	Record							
Competition	First match	Last match	Starting round	Final position	Pld	W	D	L	GF	GA	GD	Win %
Bundesliga	6 August 2022	27 May 2023	Matchday 1	8th	34	13	10	11	57	48	+9	38.24
DFB-Pokal	30 July 2022	31 January 2023	First round	Round of 16	3	2	0	1	4	3	+1	66.67
Total					37	15	10	12	61	51	+10	40.54

Source: Soccerway

=== Bundesliga ===
==== League table ====
Pos	Team	Pld	W	D	L	GF	GA	GD	Pts	Qualification or relegation
6	Bayer Leverkusen	34	14	8	12	57	49	+8	50	Qualification for the Europa League group stage (Note: Since the 2022–23 DFB-Pokal winners, RB Leipzig, qualified for the Champions League based on league position, the Europa League group stage spot was passed to the sixth-placed team, and the Europa Conference League play-off round spot was passed to the seventh-placed team.)
7	Eintracht Frankfurt	34	13	11	10	58	52	+6	50	Qualification for the Europa Conference League play-off round
8	VfL Wolfsburg	34	13	10	11	57	48	+9	49	
9	Mainz 05	34	12	10	12	54	55	−1	46	
10	Borussia Mönchengladbach	34	11	10	13	52	55	−3	43	

Source: DFB
Rules for classification: 1) Points; 2) Goal difference; 3) Goals scored; 4) Head-to-head results; 5) Head-to-head away goals scored; 6) Away goals scored; 7) Play-off.

==== Results summary ====
Overall								Home						Away					
Pld	W	D	L	GF	GA	GD	Pts	W	D	L	GF	GA	GD	W	D	L	GF	GA	GD
34	13	10	11	57	48	+9	49	6	7	4	34	25	+9	7	3	7	23	23	0

Source: DFB

==== Results by round ====
Round	1	2	3	4	5	6	7	8	9	10	11	12	13	14	15	16	17	18	19	20	21	22	23	24	25	26	27	28	29	30	31	32	33	34
Ground	H	A	H	A	H	A	A	H	A	H	A	H	A	H	A	H	A	A	H	A	H	A	H	H	A	H	A	H	A	H	A	H	A	H
Result	D	L	D	L	L	W	L	W	D	D	D	W	W	W	W	W	W	L	L	D	L	W	D	D	W	D	L	D	W	W	L	W	L	L
Position	8	14	14	15	17	16	17	13	13	13	14	12	11	8	7	7	7	7	7	7	7	7	8	8	7	9	9	9	8	7	7	6	7	8

Source: DFB
A = Away; H = Home; W = Win; D = Draw; L = Loss

==== Matches ====
The league fixtures were announced on 17 June 2022.

6 August 2022 1	VfL Wolfsburg	2–2	Werder Bremen	Wolfsburg
15:30 CEST (UTC+2)	L. Nmecha 11', (yellow card) 90+3'; Van de Ven (yellow card) 52'; Guilavogui 84'	Report	Füllkrug 21'; Bittencourt 23'; Weiser (yellow card) 56'; Pieper (yellow card) 58'	Stadium: Volkswagen Arena; Attendance: 28,015; Referee: Sascha Stegemann

14 August 2022 2	Bayern Munich	2–0	VfL Wolfsburg	Munich
17:30 CEST (UTC+2)	Hernandez (yellow card) 15'; Ulreich (yellow card) 23'; Musiala 33'; Müller 44'	Report	Svanberg (yellow card) 52'	Stadium: Allianz Arena; Attendance: 75,000; Referee: Harm Osmers

20 August 2022 3	VfL Wolfsburg	0–0	Schalke 04	Wolfsburg
15:30 CEST (UTC+2)	Bornauw (yellow card) 26'	Report	Latza (yellow card) 4'; Thiaw (yellow card) 25'; Terodde (penalty missed) 45+3'; Bulter (yellow card) 65'	Stadium: Volkswagen Arena; Attendance: 26,959; Referee: Felix Zwayer

27 August 2022 4	RB Leipzig	2–0	VfL Wolfsburg	Leipzig
15:30 CEST (UTC+2)	Nkunku 5' (pen.), 90'; Henrichs (yellow card) 8'; Laimer (yellow card) 47'; Werner (yellow card) 88'	Report	Arnold (yellow card) 26'; Otávio (yellow card) 51'; Baku (yellow card) 53'	Stadium: Red Bull Arena; Attendance: 41,243; Referee: Bastian Dankert

3 September 2022 5	VfL Wolfsburg	2–4	1. FC Köln	Wolfsburg
15:30 CEST (UTC+2)	L. Nmecha 2', 79'; Van de Ven (yellow card) 38'; Marmoush (yellow card) 82'	Report	Ljubičić 22'; Otávio 31' (o.g.); Kainz 45+2' (pen.); Duda (yellow card) 63'; Adamyan 81'	Stadium: Volkswagen Arena; Attendance: 25,654; Referee: Matthias Jöllenbeck

10 September 2022 6	Eintracht Frankfurt	0–1	VfL Wolfsburg	Frankfurt
15:30 CEST (UTC+2)	Sow (yellow card) 15'; Tuta (yellow card) 62'	Report	Otávio (yellow card) 10'; Svanberg (yellow card) 52'; Lacroix 60'; L. Nmecha (yellow card) 86'; Arnold (yellow card) 90+1'	Stadium: Deutsche Bank Park; Attendance: 49,000; Referee: Tobias Reichel

18 September 2022 7	Union Berlin	2–0	VfL Wolfsburg	Berlin
15:30 CEST (UTC+2)	Pefok 54'; Becker 77'	Report		Stadium: Stadion An der Alten Försterei; Attendance: 22,012; Referee: Robert Schröder

1 October 2022 8	VfL Wolfsburg	3–2	VfB Stuttgart	Wolfsburg
15:30 CEST (UTC+2)	Marmoush 23'; Arnold 38'; Wimmer (yellow card) 42'; Baku (yellow card) 53'; Arnold (yellow card) 71'; Gerhardt 90+1'	Report	Guirassy 22', (yellow card) 47'; Mavropanos 45+1'; Anton (yellow card) 48'; Ito (yellow card) 70'; Karazor (yellow card) 79'; Millot (yellow card) 84'	Stadium: Volkswagen Arena; Attendance: 24,125; Referee: Felix Zwayer

8 October 2022 9	FC Augsburg	1–1	VfL Wolfsburg	Augsburg
15:30 CEST (UTC+2)	Bauer (yellow card) 38'; Gruezo (yellow card) 40'; Gouweleeuw (yellow card) 40'; Gumny 55'; Iago (yellow card) 84'; Caligiuri (yellow card) 90'	Report	Gerhardt 27', (yellow card) 37'; Otávio (yellow card) 40'; Guilavogui (yellow card) 75'	Stadium: WWK Arena; Attendance: 26,220; Referee: Daniel Siebert

15 October 2022 10	VfL Wolfsburg	2–2	Borussia Mönchengladbach	Wolfsburg
15:30 CEST (UTC+2)	Gerhardt 43'; Wimmer (yellow card) 65'; Marmoush 69'; Otávio (yellow card) 81'; Arnold (yellow card) 84'	Report	Thuram 13', 48'; Weigl (yellow card) 45+2'; Stindl (yellow card) 84'; Koné (yellow card) 86'	Stadium: Volkswagen Arena; Attendance: 26,701; Referee: Benjamin Cortus

22 October 2022 11	Bayer Leverkusen	2–2	VfL Wolfsburg	Leverkusen
15:30 CEST (UTC+2)	Diaby (penalty missed) 10', 17'; Tah (yellow card) 49'; Frimpong 75'; Andrich (yellow card) 80'; Fosu-Mensah (yellow card) 90'	Report	Andrich 28' (o.g.); Arnold 54' (pen.); F. Nmecha (yellow card) 60'	Stadium: BayArena; Attendance: 26,294; Referee: Felix Brych

29 October 2022 12	VfL Wolfsburg	4–0	VfL Bochum	Wolfsburg
15:30 CEST (UTC+2)	Bornauw (yellow card) 24'; F. Nmecha 27', 58'; Baku 35'; Wind 80'	Report	Heintz (yellow card) 57'	Stadium: Volkswagen Arena; Attendance: 24,037; Referee: Robert Hartmann

5 November 2022 13	Mainz 05	0–3	VfL Wolfsburg	Mainz
15:30 CET (UTC+1)	Stach (yellow card) 75'	Report	Wimmer 33'; Arnold 70'; Baku (yellow card) 53', (goal) 84'	Stadium: Mewa Arena; Attendance: 26,750; Referee: Daniel Siebert

8 November 2022 14	VfL Wolfsburg	2–0	Borussia Dortmund	Wolfsburg
18:30 CET (UTC+1)	Van de Ven 6'; F. Nmecha (yellow card) 45+1'; Marmoush (yellow card) 54'; L. Nmecha (yellow card) 76', (goal) 90+1'	Report	Hummels (yellow card) 84'; Modeste (yellow card) 90+4'	Stadium: Volkswagen Arena; Attendance: 28,675; Referee: Christian Dingert

12 November 2022 15	1899 Hoffenheim	1–2	VfL Wolfsburg	Sinsheim
15:30 CET (UTC+1)	Baumgartner 42'	Report	Bornauw (yellow card) 14'; Kabak 45+4' (o.g.); Fischer (yellow card) 49'; Van de Ven (yellow card) 55'; Baku 56'	Stadium: Rhein-Neckar-Arena; Attendance: 18,014; Referee: Daniel Schlager

21 January 2023 16	VfL Wolfsburg	6–0	SC Freiburg	Wolfsburg
15:30 CET (UTC+1)	Wimmer 1'; Otávio (yellow card) 22'; Wind 28', 37'; Gerhardt 56'; Baku 80'; Waldschmidt 90+4' (pen.)	Report	Jeong (yellow card) 53'; Eggestein (yellow card) 72'	Stadium: Volkswagen Arena; Attendance: 25,849; Referee: Felix Zwayer

24 January 2023 17	Hertha BSC	0–5	VfL Wolfsburg	Berlin
20:30 CET (UTC+1)	Rogel (yellow card) 28'; Lukebakio (yellow card) 30'	Report	Svanberg 4'; Arnold 31' (pen.); Wind 34'; Baku 72'; Marmoush 86'	Stadium: Olympiastadion; Attendance: 29,483; Referee: Tobias Reichel

28 January 2023 18	Werder Bremen	2–1	VfL Wolfsburg	Bremen
15:30 CET (UTC+1)	Füllkrug 24' (pen.), 77'; Stark (yellow card) 39'; Friedl (yellow card) 90+2'; Weiser (yellow card) 90+6'	Report	Baku (yellow card) 67'; Paredes 90', (yellow card) 90+6'; Van de Ven (yellow card) 90+6'	Stadium: Weserstadion; Attendance: 41,000; Referee: Daniel Siebert

5 February 2023 19	VfL Wolfsburg	2–4	Bayern Munich	Wolfsburg
17:30 CET (UTC+1)	Otávio (yellow card) 38'; Kamiński 44'; Svanberg 80'; Bornauw (yellow card) 90+5'	Report	Coman 9', 14'; Müller 19'; Kimmich (yellow card) 34' (yellow-red card) 54'; Sané (yellow card) 35'; Goretzka (yellow card) 45+2'; Musiala 73'; Wanner (yellow card) 90'; Tel (yellow card) 90+2'	Stadium: Volkswagen Arena; Attendance: 30,000; Referee: Harm Osmers

10 February 2023 20	Schalke 04	0–0	VfL Wolfsburg	Gelsenkirchen
20:30 CET (UTC+1)	Zalazar (yellow card) 48'	Report	Arnold (penalty missed) 9'; Wimmer (yellow card) 29'; Gerhardt (yellow card) 48'; Svanberg (yellow card) 90+2'; Guilavogui (yellow card) 90+3'	Stadium: Veltins-Arena; Attendance: 60,836; Referee: Benjamin Brand

18 February 2023 21	VfL Wolfsburg	0–3	RB Leipzig	Wolfsburg
15:30 CET (UTC+1)	Bornauw (yellow card) 90'	Report	Forsberg 14'; Raum (yellow card) 65'; Laimer 85'; Szoboszlai 90+2'	Stadium: Volkswagen Arena; Attendance: 24,831; Referee: Deniz Aytekin

25 February 2023 22	1. FC Köln	0–2	VfL Wolfsburg	Cologne
15:30 CET (UTC+1)	Hector (yellow card) 66'	Report	Gerhardt 4'; Arnold 68' (pen.); Svanberg (yellow card) 73'; F. Nmecha (yellow card) 90+4'	Stadium: RheinEnergieStadion; Attendance: 49,300; Referee: Frank Willenborg

5 March 2023 26	VfL Wolfsburg	2–2	Eintracht Frankfurt	Wolfsburg
17:30 CET (UTC+1)	Marmoush 10'; Gerhardt 43'; Wimmer (yellow card) 48'; Otávio (yellow card) 84'; Arnold (yellow card) 84'	Report	Kolo Muani 22'; Ndicka 26'; Götze (yellow card) 45+4'; Rode (yellow card) 58'; Jakić (yellow card) 84'	Stadium: Volkswagen Arena; Attendance: 27,853; Referee: Daniel Schlager

12 March 2023 27	VfL Wolfsburg	1–1	Union Berlin	Wolfsburg
19:30 CET (UTC+1)	Bornauw (yellow card) 73'; Wimmer 84'	Report	Khedira (yellow card) 6'; Thorsby (yellow card) 14'; Juranović 72' (pen.); Leite (yellow card) 75'; Behrens (yellow card) 90+4'	Stadium: Volkswagen Arena; Attendance: 23,554; Referee: Robert Schröder

18 March 2023 25	VfB Stuttgart	0–1	VfL Wolfsburg	Stuttgart
15:30 CET (UTC+1)	Karazor (yellow card) 9'	Report	Marmoush 56'	Stadium: Mercedes-Benz Arena; Attendance: 44,900; Referee: Felix Brych

1 April 2023 26	VfL Wolfsburg	2–2	FC Augsburg	Wolfsburg
15:30 CEST (UTC+2)	Arnold (penalty missed) 21'; Baku (yellow card) 51'; Wimmer (yellow card) 56'; Waldschmidt 84'; Paredes (yellow card) 90+3'; F. Nmecha 90+6'	Report	Arnold 2' (o.g.); Berisha 32'; Valentin (yellow card) 87'; Maier (yellow card) 90+4'	Stadium: Volkswagen Arena; Attendance: 22,107; Referee: Martin Petersen

9 April 2023 27	Borussia Mönchengladbach	2–0	VfL Wolfsburg	Mönchengladbach
15:30 CEST (UTC+2)	Ngoumou 34'; Thuram 63'	Report	Lacroix (yellow card) 52'	Stadium: Borussia-Park; Attendance: 51,127; Referee: Timo Gerach

16 April 2023 28	VfL Wolfsburg	0–0	Bayer Leverkusen	Wolfsburg
19:30 CEST (UTC+2)		Report	Amiri (yellow card) 61'; Hincapié (yellow card) 72'; Kossounou (yellow card) 77'; Diaby (yellow card) 85'; Wirtz (yellow card) 88'	Stadium: Volkswagen Arena; Attendance: 20,137; Referee: Sascha Stegemann

22 April 2023 29	VfL Bochum	1–5	VfL Wolfsburg	Bochum
15:30 CEST (UTC+2)	Stöger (yellow card) 21'; Mašović (yellow card) 31'; Antwi-Adjei (yellow card) 37'; Broschinski 69'	Report	Svanberg 10', 56'; Kamiński 21'; Wimmer (yellow card) 24', (goal) 33'; Wind (penalty missed) 77'; Waldschmidt 77'; Guilavogui (yellow card) 80'; Van de Ven (yellow card) 84'	Stadium: Vonovia Ruhrstadion; Attendance: 24,834; Referee: Felix Brych

30 April 2023 30	VfL Wolfsburg	3–0	Mainz 05	Wolfsburg
17:30 CEST (UTC+2)	Wind 5', 28'; Bornauw 13', (yellow card) 86'	Report	Bell (yellow card) 45'; Kohr (yellow card) 54'; Martín (yellow card) 66'	Stadium: Volkswagen Arena; Attendance: 23,817; Referee: Daniel Siebert

7 May 2023 31	Borussia Dortmund	6–0	VfL Wolfsburg	Dortmund
17:30 CEST (UTC+2)	Adeyemi 14', 59', (penalty missed) 65'; Haller 28'; Malen 37'; Bellingham 54', 86'	Report	Fischer (yellow card) 64'	Stadium: Signal Iduna Park; Attendance: 81,365; Referee: Marco Fritz

13 May 2023 32	VfL Wolfsburg	2–1	1899 Hoffenheim	Wolfsburg
15:30 CEST (UTC+2)	Kamiński 15'; Baku (yellow card) 31'; Guilavogui (yellow card) 49'; Waldschmidt 75'	Report	Bebou (yellow card) 51'; Akpoguma (yellow card) 88'; Guilavogui 90+3' (o.g.)	Stadium: Volkswagen Arena; Attendance: 22,617; Referee: Tobias Stieler

19 May 2023 33	SC Freiburg	2–0	VfL Wolfsburg	Freiburg
20:30 CEST (UTC+2)	Sallai (yellow card) 31'; Günter 71'; Petersen 75'; Höfler (red card) 90+3'	Report	Wind (yellow card) 39'; Wimmer (yellow card) 54'; Gerhardt (yellow card) 67'	Stadium: Europa-Park Stadion; Attendance: 33,300; Referee: Bastian Dankert

27 May 2023 34	VfL Wolfsburg	1–2	Hertha BSC	Wolfsburg
15:30 CEST (UTC+2)	Kamiński 2'; Bornauw (yellow card) 67'	Report	Serdar (yellow card) 44'; Kenny (yellow card) 45+5'; Plattenhardt (yellow card) 48'; Maza 55'; Richter 68', (yellow card) 90+1'; Boëtius (yellow card) 90+3'	Stadium: Volkswagen Arena; Attendance: 26,775; Referee: Benjamin Cortus

=== DFB-Pokal ===
30 July 2022 First round	Carl Zeiss Jena	0–1	VfL Wolfsburg	Jena
18:01 CEST (UTC+2)	Dahlke (yellow card) 23'; Lange (yellow card) 27'; Itoi (yellow card) 78'; Muiomo (yellow card) 90+5'	Report	Baku (yellow card) 25'; Marmoush 90+2'	Stadium: Ernst-Abbe-Sportfeld; Attendance: 6,100; Referee: Florian Heft

18 October 2022 Second round	Eintracht Braunschweig	1–2	VfL Wolfsburg	Braunschweig
20:45 CEST (UTC+2)	Schultz (yellow card) 37'; Multhaup 40'; Lauberbach (yellow card) 42'; Krauße (yellow card) 51'; Multhaup (yellow card) 90'	Report	Svanberg 8'; Bornauw (yellow card) 33'; Van de Ven (yellow card) 57'; Kamiński 65'; Wimmer (yellow card) 72'; Otávio (yellow card) 87'	Stadium: Eintracht-Stadion; Attendance: 22,000; Referee: Daniel Schlager

31 January 2023 Round of 16	Union Berlin	2–1	VfL Wolfsburg	Berlin
20:45 CET (UTC+1)	Knoche 12'; Khedira (yellow card) 42'; Gießelmann (yellow card) 42' (yellow-red card) 87'; Behrens 79'	Report	Waldschmidt 5'; Svanberg (yellow card) 57'; Van de Ven (yellow card) 77'; F. Nmecha (yellow card) 90+1'	Stadium: Stadion An der Alten Försterei; Attendance: 22,012; Referee: Sascha Stegemann

== Statistics ==
=== Appearances and goals ===
No.	Pos	Nat	Player	Total		Bundesliga		DFB-Pokal	
No.	Pos	Nat	Player	Apps	Goals	Apps	Goals	Apps	Goals
Goalkeepers
1	GK	(Belgium) BEL	Koen Casteels	36	0	34	0	2	0
12	GK	(Austria) AUT	Pavao Pervan	1	0	0	0	1	0
30	GK	(Germany) GER	Niklas Klinger	0	0	0	0	0	0
35	GK	(Germany) GER	Philipp Schulze	0	0	0	0	0	0
Defenders
2	DF	(Germany) GER	Kilian Fischer	10	0	5+5	0	0	0
3	DF	(Belgium) BEL	Sebastiaan Bornauw	28	1	23+3	1	2	0
4	DF	(France) FRA	Maxence Lacroix	26	1	18+6	1	2	0
5	DF	(Netherlands) NED	Micky van de Ven	36	1	33	1	3	0
6	DF	(Brazil) BRA	Paulo Otávio	27	0	25	0	2	0
8	DF	(France) FRA	Nicolas Cozza	6	0	0+5	0	0+1	0
42	DF	(Germany) GER	Felix Lange	0	0	0	0	0	0
Midfielders
16	MF	(Poland) POL	Jakub Kamiński	33	5	25+6	4	1+1	1
20	MF	(Germany) GER	Ridle Baku	36	5	29+4	5	3	0
22	MF	(England) ENG	Felix Nmecha	32	3	19+11	3	0+2	0
27	MF	(Germany) GER	Maximilian Arnold	34	5	32	5	2	0
29	MF	(France) FRA	Josuha Guilavogui	26	1	11+12	1	1+2	0
31	MF	(Germany) GER	Yannick Gerhardt	31	6	22+7	6	2	0
32	MF	(Sweden) SWE	Mattias Svanberg	35	5	21+11	4	3	1
36	MF	(Czech Republic) CZE	Lukáš Ambros	1	0	0+1	0	0	0
38	MF	(Croatia) CRO	Bartol Franjić	6	0	3+2	0	0+1	0
39	MF	(Austria) AUT	Patrick Wimmer	29	4	23+3	4	2+1	0
40	MF	(United States) USA	Kevin Paredes	24	1	1+21	1	0+2	0
Forwards
7	FW	(Germany) GER	Luca Waldschmidt	20	5	4+14	4	2	1
10	FW	(Germany) GER	Lukas Nmecha	18	4	10+6	4	2	0
18	FW	(Germany) GER	Dženan Pejčinović	1	0	0+1	0	0	0
23	FW	(Denmark) DEN	Jonas Wind	26	6	15+9	6	1+1	0
33	FW	(Egypt) EGY	Omar Marmoush	36	6	15+18	5	2+1	1
Players transferred out during the season
8	MF	(Belgium) BEL	Aster Vranckx	1	0	0+1	0	0	0
9	FW	(Germany) GER	Max Kruse	5	0	2+3	0	0	0
11	MF	(Switzerland) SUI	Renato Steffen	0	0	0	0	0	0
14	MF	(Croatia) CRO	Josip Brekalo	7	0	3+3	0	0+1	0
15	DF	(France) FRA	Jérôme Roussillon	4	0	0+4	0	0	0
17	FW	(Germany) GER	Maximilian Philipp	3	0	1+2	0	0	0
21	FW	(Poland) POL	Bartosz Białek	0	0	0	0	0	0
34	DF	(Croatia) CRO	Marin Pongračić	0	0	0	0	0	0
45	GK	(Germany) GER	Lino Kasten	0	0	0	0	0	0

Last updated: 27 May 2023
Source: Competitions

=== Goalscorers ===
As of 25 February 2023

Rank	No.	Pos.	Nat.	Player	Bundesliga	DFB-Pokal	Total
1	31	MF	(Germany)	Yannick Gerhardt	6	0	6
2	20	MF	(Germany)	Ridle Baku	5	0	5
2	27	MF	(Germany)	Maximilian Arnold	5	0	5
2	33	FW	(Egypt)	Omar Marmoush	4	1	5
5	10	FW	(Germany)	Lukas Nmecha	4	0	4
5	23	FW	(Denmark)	Jonas Wind	4	0	4
7	32	MF	(Sweden)	Mattias Svanberg	2	1	3
8	7	FW	(Germany)	Luca Waldschmidt	1	1	2
8	16	MF	(Poland)	Jakub Kamiński	1	1	2
8	22	MF	(England)	Felix Nmecha	2	0	2
8	39	MF	(Austria)	Patrick Wimmer	2	0	2
12	4	DF	(France)	Maxence Lacroix	1	0	1
12	5	DF	(Netherlands)	Mickey van de Ven	1	0	1
12	29	MF	(France)	Joshua Guilavogui	1	0	1
12	40	MF	(United States)	Kevin Paredes	1	0	1
Own goals					2	0	2
Totals					42	4	46
