= 2023–24 VfL Wolfsburg season =

VfL Wolfsburg
2023–24 season
- Managing directors: Michael Meeske; Jörg Schmadtke; Tim Schumacher
- Head coach: Niko Kovač (until 17 March); Ralph Hasenhüttl (from 17 March)
- Stadium: Volkswagen Arena
- Bundesliga: 12th
- DFB-Pokal: Round of 16
- Top goalscorer: League: Jonas Wind (11); All: Jonas Wind (12)
- Average home league attendance: 25,546
Home colours	Away colours	Third colours

The 2023–24 season was VfL Wolfsburg's 79th season in existence and 27th consecutive season in the Bundesliga. They also competed in the DFB-Pokal.

== Players ==
=== First-team squad ===
As of 2 February 2024

Note: Flags indicate national team as defined under FIFA eligibility rules; some limited exceptions apply. Players may hold more than one non-FIFA nationality.

No.	Pos.	Nation	Player
1	GK	BEL	Koen Casteels (vice-captain)
2	DF	GER	Kilian Fischer
3	DF	BEL	Sebastiaan Bornauw
4	DF	FRA	Maxence Lacroix
5	DF	SUI	Cédric Zesiger
6	MF	BEL	Aster Vranckx
7	MF	CZE	Václav Černý
9	FW	FRA	Amin Sarr (on loan from Lyon)
10	FW	GER	Lukas Nmecha
11	FW	POR	Tiago Tomás
12	GK	AUT	Pavao Pervan
13	DF	BRA	Rogério
16	MF	POL	Jakub Kamiński
17	FW	GER	Kevin Behrens
18	FW	GER	Dzenan Pejcinovic

No.	Pos.	Nation	Player
19	MF	CRO	Lovro Majer
20	MF	GER	Ridle Baku
21	DF	DEN	Joakim Mæhle
23	FW	DEN	Jonas Wind
25	DF	GER	Moritz Jenz
26	MF	USA	Ulysses Llanez
27	MF	GER	Maximilian Arnold (captain)
30	GK	GER	Niklas Klinger
31	MF	GER	Yannick Gerhardt
32	MF	SWE	Mattias Svanberg
39	MF	AUT	Patrick Wimmer
40	MF	USA	Kevin Paredes

=== Players out on loan ===
Note: Flags indicate national team as defined under FIFA eligibility rules; some limited exceptions apply. Players may hold more than one non-FIFA nationality.

No.	Pos.	Nation	Player
—	GK	GER	Philipp Schulze (at Hallescher FC until 30 June 2024)
—	DF	FRA	Nicolas Cozza (at Nantes until 30 June 2024)
—	DF	GER	Felix Lange (at SV Rödinghausen until 30 June 2024)
—	MF	CZE	Lukáš Ambros (at SC Freiburg II until 30 June 2024)

No.	Pos.	Nation	Player
—	MF	CRO	Bartol Franjić (at Darmstadt 98 until 30 June 2024)
—	MF	GER	Maximilian Philipp (at SC Freiburg until 30 June 2024)
—	FW	POL	Bartosz Białek (at Eupen until 30 June 2024)
—	FW	GER	Luca Waldschmidt (at 1. FC Köln until 30 June 2024)

== Transfers ==
=== In ===
Pos.	Player	Transferred from	Fee	Date	Source
FW	(Czech Republic) Václav Černý	(Netherlands) FC Twente	€8,000,000	1 July 2023	
DF	(Germany) Moritz Jenz	(France) Lorient	€8,000,000	1 July 2023	
DF	(Switzerland) Cédric Zesiger	(Switzerland) BSC Young Boys	€5,000,000	1 July 2023	
FW	(Portugal) Tiago Tomás	(Portugal) Sporting CP	€8,800,000	5 July 2023	
DF	(Brazil) Rogério	(Italy) Sassuolo	€5,500,000	5 August 2023	
DF	(Denmark) Joakim Mæhle	(Italy) Atalanta	€12,000,000	12 August 2023	
MF	(Croatia) Lovro Majer	(France) Rennes	€30,000,000	16 August 2023	
FW	(Sweden) Amin Sarr	(France) Lyon	Loan	31 August 2023	
FW	(Germany) Kevin Behrens	(Germany) Union Berlin	€2,000,000	31 January 2024	

=== Out ===
Pos.	Player	Transferred to	Fee	Date	Source
DF	(Germany) Fabio Di Michele Sanchez	(Germany) 1. FC Saarbrücken	Undisclosed	1 July 2023	
MF	(France) Josuha Guilavogui		Free	1 July 2023	
MF	(United States) Bryang Kayo	(Germany) FC Ingolstadt	Undisclosed	1 July 2023	
FW	(Egypt) Omar Marmoush	(Germany) Eintracht Frankfurt	Free	1 July 2023	
DF	(Brazil) Paulo Otávio	(Qatar) Al Sadd	Free	1 July 2023	
DF	(Croatia) Marin Pongračić	(Italy) Lecce	€2,000,000	1 July 2023	
DF	(Germany) Tim Siersleben	(Germany) 1. FC Heidenheim	€500,000	1 July 2023	
FW	(Germany) Luca Waldschmidt	(Germany) 1. FC Köln	Loan	1 July 2023	
MF	(Germany) Felix Nmecha	(Germany) Borussia Dortmund	€30,000,000	3 July 2023	
FW	(South Korea) Hong Yun-sang	(South Korea) Pohang Steelers	Undisclosed	11 July 2023	
FW	(Poland) Bartosz Białek	(Belgium) Eupen	Loan	12 July 2023	
DF	(Republic of Ireland) Anselmo García MacNulty	(Netherlands) PEC Zwolle	Undisclosed	26 July 2023	
DF	(Netherlands) Micky van de Ven	(England) Tottenham Hotspur	€40,000,000	8 August 2023	
MF	(Croatia) Bartol Franjić	(Germany) Darmstadt 98	Loan	18 August 2023	
FW	(Germany) Maximilian Philipp	(Germany) SC Freiburg	Loan	21 August 2023	
MF	(Czech Republic) Lukáš Ambros	(Germany) SC Freiburg II	Loan	1 September 2023	
GK	(Germany) Philipp Schulze	(Germany) Hallescher FC	Loan	8 January 2024	
DF	(Germany) Felix Lange	(Germany) SV Rödinghausen	Loan	26 January 2024	
DF	(France) Nicolas Cozza	(France) FC Nantes	Loan	2 February 2024	

== Pre-season and friendlies ==
Win Draw Loss Fixtures

22 July 2023 Friendly	SC Freiburg	2–3	VfL Wolfsburg	Zams, Austria
14:00 CEST (UTC+2)	Breunig 22'; Baur 66'	Report	Philipp 76'; Nmecha 78' (pen.); Tomás 87'	Stadium: Eurogast-Grissemann-Arena Zams
Note: Match was played in two periods of sixty minutes each.

29 July 2023 Friendly	VfL Wolfsburg	1–1	Lens	Wolfsburg
15:00 CEST (UTC+2)	Baku 76'	Report	Machado 81'	Stadium: AOK Stadion

2 August 2023 Friendly	VfL Wolfsburg	1–2	Spezia	Villingen-Schwenningen
17:00 CEST (UTC+2)	Wind 9'	Report	Krollis 55'; Esposito 72'	Stadium: MS-Technologie-Arena; Attendance: 1,300

5 August 2023 Friendly	VfL Wolfsburg	1–1	Sassuolo	Wolfsburg
15:00 CEST (UTC+2)	Wind 27'	Report	Bajrami 42'	Stadium: VfL-Stadion am Elsterweg

5 August 2023 Friendly	VfL Wolfsburg	0–1	Celta Vigo	Wolfsburg
17:00 CEST (UTC+2)		Report	Núñez 29'	Stadium: Volkswagen Arena

6 January 2024 Friendly	Schalke 04	2–3	VfL Wolfsburg	Faro, Portugal
16:30 CET (UTC+1)	Terodde 34'; Baumgartl 90+1'		Kamiński 32'; Černý 40'; Pejčinović 80'

== Competitions ==
=== Overall record ===
Competition	First match	Last match	Starting round	Final position	Record							
Competition	First match	Last match	Starting round	Final position	Pld	W	D	L	GF	GA	GD	Win %
Bundesliga	19 August 2023	18 May 2024	Matchday 1	12th	34	10	7	17	41	56	−15	29.41
DFB-Pokal	13 August 2023	5 December 2023	First round	Round of 16	3	2	0	1	7	1	+6	66.67
Total					37	12	7	18	48	57	−9	32.43

Source: Soccerway

=== Bundesliga ===
==== League table ====
Pos	Team	Pld	W	D	L	GF	GA	GD	Pts
10	SC Freiburg	34	11	9	14	45	58	−13	42
11	FC Augsburg	34	10	9	15	50	60	−10	39
12	VfL Wolfsburg	34	10	7	17	41	56	−15	37
13	Mainz 05	34	7	14	13	39	51	−12	35
14	Borussia Mönchengladbach	34	7	13	14	56	67	−11	34

Source: DFB
Rules for classification: 1) Points; 2) Goal difference; 3) Goals scored; 4) Head-to-head results; 5) Head-to-head away goals scored; 6) Away goals scored; 7) Play-off.

==== Results summary ====
Overall								Home						Away					
Pld	W	D	L	GF	GA	GD	Pts	W	D	L	GF	GA	GD	W	D	L	GF	GA	GD
34	10	7	17	41	56	−15	37	6	4	7	25	25	0	4	3	10	16	31	−15

Source: DFB

==== Results by round ====
Round	1	2	3	4	5	6	7	8	9	10	11	12	13	14	15	16	17	18	19	20	21	22	23	24	25	26	27	28	29	30	31	32	33	34
Ground	H	A	A	H	A	H	A	H	A	H	A	H	A	H	A	H	A	A	H	H	A	H	A	H	A	H	A	H	A	H	A	H	A	H
Result	W	W	L	W	L	W	L	L	L	D	L	W	L	L	W	L	D	D	D	D	L	D	D	L	L	L	W	L	L	W	W	W	L	L
Position	4	4	7	6	7	7	7	9	9	9	11	8	11	11	9	10	11	11	11	11	12	12	13	13	13	14	14	14	14	13	12	12	12	12

Source: DFB
A = Away; H = Home; W = Win; D = Draw; L = Loss

==== Matches ====
The league fixtures were unveiled on 30 June 2023.

19 August 2023 1	VfL Wolfsburg	2–0	1. FC Heidenheim	Wolfsburg
15:30 CEST (UTC+2)	Wind 6', 27'; Gerhardt (yellow card) 36'; Wimmer (yellow card) 45+5'; Vrancx (yellow card) 90+2'	Report		Stadium: Volkswagen Arena; Attendance: 22,620; Referee: Florian Badstübner

26 August 2023 2	1. FC Köln	1–2	VfL Wolfsburg	Cologne
15:30 CEST (UTC+2)	Adamyan (yellow card) 49'; Waldschmidt 55'	Report	Černý (yellow card) 58'; Wind 62', 79', (yellow card) 90'; Majer (yellow card) 79'; Arnold (yellow card) 89'; Zesiger (yellow card) 90+4'	Stadium: RheinEnergieStadion; Attendance: 49,500; Referee: Matthias Jöllenbeck

2 September 2023 3	1899 Hoffenheim	3–1	VfL Wolfsburg	Sinsheim
15:30 CEST (UTC+2)	Weghorst (yellow card) 10'; Bebou (yellow card) 25'; Brooks 45+2'; Beier 60'; Skov 74'	Report	Tomás 36'; Mæhle (yellow card) 43'; Svanberg (yellow card) 74'	Stadium: Rhein-Neckar-Arena; Attendance: 17,500; Referee: Felix Zwayer

16 September 2023 4	VfL Wolfsburg	2–1	Union Berlin	Wolfsburg
15:30 CEST (UTC+2)	Wind 12'; Mæhle 30'; Svanberg (yellow card) 78'	Report	Gosens 28'	Stadium: Volkswagen Arena; Attendance: 21,917; Referee: Felix Brych

23 September 2023 5	Borussia Dortmund	1–0	VfL Wolfsburg	Dortmund
15:30 CEST (UTC+2)	Reus 68'	Report	Černý (yellow card) 24'	Stadium: Signal Iduna Park; Attendance: 81,365; Referee: Sven Jablonski

30 September 2023 6	VfL Wolfsburg	2–0	Eintracht Frankfurt	Wolfsburg
15:30 CEST (UTC+2)	Wind 31', 84', (penalty missed) 84'; Zesiger (yellow card) 73'	Report	Pacho (yellow card) 5'; Götze (yellow card) 42' (yellow-red card) 58'; Buta (yellow card) 45+2'; Knauff (yellow card) 89'; Ngankam (yellow card) 90+4'	Stadium: Volkswagen Arena; Attendance: 28,323; Referee: Frank Willenborg

7 October 2023 7	VfB Stuttgart	3–1	VfL Wolfsburg	Stuttgart
15:30 CEST (UTC+2)	Guirassy 66' (pen.), 78', 82'; Undav (yellow card) 90+4'	Report	Svanberg (yellow card) 5'; Gerhardt 34'; Wind (yellow card) 42'; Vranckx (yellow card) 73'	Stadium: MHPArena; Attendance: 52,000; Referee: Daniel Siebert

21 October 2023 8	VfL Wolfsburg	1–2	Bayer Leverkusen	Wolfsburg
15:30 CEST (UTC+2)	Arnold (yellow card) 36'; Lacroix 41'; Baku (yellow card) 45'; Mæhle (yellow card) 65'	Report	Frimpong 13'; Palacios (yellow card) 37'; Xhaka (yellow card) 55'; Adli (yellow card) 56'; Grimaldo 62'; Hofmann (yellow card) 74'; Tapsoba (yellow card) 86'	Stadium: Volkswagen Arena; Attendance: 28,917; Referee: Marco Fritz

28 October 2023 9	FC Augsburg	3–2	VfL Wolfsburg	Augsburg
15:30 CEST (UTC+2)	Tietz 17'; Gouweleeuw (yellow card) 45+5'; Valentin (yellow card) 45+5'; Bornauw 79' (o.g.); Engels 81'; Uduokhai (yellow card) 84' (yellow-red card) 87'; Beljo (yellow card) 85'	Report	Mæhle (yellow card) 6'; Wind 35'; Majer 45' (pen.); Tomás (yellow card) 66'; Arnold (yellow card) 73'; Bornauw (yellow card) 90+2'	Stadium: WWK Arena; Attendance: 28,000; Referee: Daniel Schlager

5 November 2023 10	VfL Wolfsburg	2–2	Werder Bremen	Wolfsburg
15:30 CET (UTC+1)	Lacroix (yellow card) 6' (yellow-red card) 88'; Černý 37'; Paredes 59', (yellow card) 66'; Wind (yellow card) 80'	Report	Ducksch 7'; Bittencourt (yellow card) 64'; Borré 65'	Stadium: Volkswagen Arena; Attendance: 28,917; Referee: Tobias Reichel

10 November 2023 11	Borussia Mönchengladbach	4–0	VfL Wolfsburg	Mönchengladbach
20:30 CET (UTC+1)	Čvančara 16'; Elvedi (yellow card) 29'; Reitz 42'; Honorat 64'; Pléa 71'	Report	Arnold (yellow card) 33'; Vranckx (yellow card) 69'; Cozza (yellow card) 83'	Stadium: Borussia-Park; Attendance: 45,308; Referee: Felix Zwayer

25 November 2023 12	VfL Wolfsburg	2–1	RB Leipzig	Wolfsburg
15:30 CET (UTC+1)	Wind 9'; Svanberg (yellow card) 35'; Zesiger (yellow card) 45+4'; Lacroix (yellow card) 59'; Rogério 66'; Casteels (yellow card) 90+2'	Report	Openda (yellow card) 33'; Poulsen 52'; Simons (yellow card) 79'	Stadium: Volkswagen Arena; Attendance: 25,350; Referee: Robert Hartmann

2 December 2023 13	VfL Bochum	3–1	VfL Wolfsburg	Bochum
15:30 CET (UTC+1)	Osterhage 19'; Bero (yellow card) 36'; Bernardo 39'; Stöger (yellow card) 45+2'; Asano (yellow card) 62'; Gamboa (yellow card) 81'; Wittek (yellow card) 86'; Antwi-Adjei 87'; Schlotterbeck (yellow card) 90+2'	Report	Vranckx (yellow card) 21'; Svanberg 45+1'; Jenz (yellow card) 53'	Stadium: Vonovia Ruhrstadion; Attendance: 24,350; Referee: Robert Schröder

9 December 2023 14	VfL Wolfsburg	0–1	SC Freiburg	Wolfsburg
15:30 CET (UTC+1)	Arnold (yellow card) 85'	Report	Höfler (yellow card) 57'; Gregoritsch 74'; Sallai (yellow card) 77'; Röhl (yellow card) 85'; Höler (yellow card) 86'	Stadium: Volkswagen Arena; Attendance: 20,146; Referee: Marco Fritz

16 December 2023 15	Darmstadt 98	0–1	VfL Wolfsburg	Darmstadt
15:30 CET (UTC+1)	Honsak (yellow card) 69'; Gjasula (yellow card) 90+6'	Report	Lacroix (red card) 27'; Majer 63'	Stadium: Merck-Stadion am Böllenfalltor; Attendance: 16,900; Referee: Robert Hartmann

20 December 2023 16	VfL Wolfsburg	1–2	Bayern Munich	Wolfsburg
20:30 CET (UTC+1)	Zesiger (yellow card) 11'; Arnold 45+1'; Majer (yellow card) 46'; Baku (yellow card) 59'; Tomás (yellow card) 90+1'	Report	Pavlović (yellow card) 20'; Musiala 33'; Kane 43'; Guerreiro (yellow card) 90+1'	Stadium: Volkswagen Arena; Attendance: 28,917; Referee: Sascha Stegemann

13 January 2024 17	Mainz 05	1–1	VfL Wolfsburg	Mainz
15:30 CET (UTC+1)	Widmer (yellow card) 3', (goal) 61'; Van den Berg (yellow card) 46'; Fernandes (yellow card) 57'	Report	Černý 12'; Vranckx (yellow card) 16'; Jenz (yellow card) 27'; Casteels (yellow card) 54'; Svanberg (yellow card) 79'	Stadium: Mewa Arena; Attendance: 24,000; Referee: Patrick Ittrich

20 January 2024 18	1. FC Heidenheim	1–1	VfL Wolfsburg	Heidenheim
15:30 CET (UTC+1)	Jenz 45+2' (pen.)	Report	Černý 7'; Gerhardt (yellow card) 45+4'	Stadium: Voith-Arena; Attendance: 15,000; Referee: Timo Gerach

27 January 2024 19	VfL Wolfsburg	1–1	1. FC Köln	Wolfsburg
15:30 CET (UTC+1)	Paredes 40', (yellow card) 73'; Svanberg (yellow card) 57'; Mæhle (yellow card) 69'; Lacroix (yellow card) 77'; Pejčinović (yellow card) 90+1'	Report	Alidou 38'; Schmitz (yellow card) 43'; Ljubičić (yellow card) 45+8'; Huseinbašić (yellow card) 77'	Stadium: Volkswagen Arena; Attendance: 24,525; Referee: Sören Storks

4 February 2024 20	VfL Wolfsburg	2–2	1899 Hoffenheim	Wolfsburg
15:30 CET (UTC+1)	Majer 58', 70' (pen.), (yellow card) 90+6'; Jenz (yellow card) 90+2'	Report	Beier 6'; Kabak (yellow card) 57'; Prömel 66'; Nsoki (yellow card) 69'; Brooks (yellow card) 90+2'	Stadium: Volkswagen Arena; Attendance: 22,917; Referee: Florian Badstübner

10 February 2024 21	Union Berlin	1–0	VfL Wolfsburg	Berlin
15:30 CET (UTC+1)	Doekhi 45+21'; Roussillon (yellow card) 85'	Report	Arnold (yellow card) 90+1'; Pervan (yellow card) 90+5'	Stadium: Stadion An der Alten Försterei; Attendance: 21,816; Referee: Matthias Jöllenbeck
Note: The match was suspended in the 39th and 43rd minutes due to fan protests.

17 February 2024 22	VfL Wolfsburg	1–1	Borussia Dortmund	Wolfsburg
15:30 CET (UTC+1)	Gerhardt 64', (yellow card) 71'; Arnold (yellow card) 90+7'; Jenz (yellow card) 90+8'	Report	Füllkrug 8'; Moukoko (yellow card) 90+8'	Stadium: Volkswagen Arena; Attendance: 28,917; Referee: Martin Petersen

25 February 2024 23	Eintracht Frankfurt	2–2	VfL Wolfsburg	Frankfurt
15:30 CET (UTC+1)	Max 14'; Ekitike (yellow card) 41'; Dina Ebimbe (yellow card) 44'; Marmoush 90+2'	Report	Lacroix 2'; Behrens 36'; Gerhardt (yellow card) 40'	Stadium: Deutsche Bank Park; Attendance: 56,500; Referee: Daniel Schlager

2 March 2024 24	VfL Wolfsburg	2–3	VfB Stuttgart	Wolfsburg
18:30 CET (UTC+1)	Arnold (yellow card) 3'; Baku (yellow card) 22'; Mæhle 50', (yellow card) 52'; Nmecha 83'	Report	Guirassy 14', 54' (pen.); Anton (yellow card) 58'; Vagnoman 78'	Stadium: Volkswagen Arena; Attendance: 28,917; Referee: Benjamin Brand

10 March 2024 25	Bayer Leverkusen	2–0	VfL Wolfsburg	Leverkusen
19:30 CET (UTC+1)	Tella 37'; Adli (yellow card) 80'; Wirtz 86'	Report	Gerhardt (yellow card) 7'; Jenz (yellow card) 12' (yellow-red card) 28'	Stadium: BayArena; Attendance: 29,314; Referee: Daniel Siebert

16 March 2024 26	VfL Wolfsburg	1–3	FC Augsburg	Wolfsburg
15:30 CET (UTC+1)	Wimmer 9', (red card) 45'; Svanberg (yellow card) 82'	Report	Maier 45+2'; Jakić 61', 79'; Jensen (yellow card) 64'; Demirović (yellow card) 68'; Biel (yellow card) 70'	Stadium: Volkswagen Arena; Attendance: 21,735; Referee: Timo Gerach

30 March 2024 27	Werder Bremen	0–2	VfL Wolfsburg	Bremen
15:30 CET (UTC+1)	Agu (yellow card) 14'; Jung (red card) 43'; Ducksch (yellow card) 45+4'; Alvero (yellow card) 72'; Hansen-Aarøen (yellow card) 89'	Report	Lacroix 45+4', (red card) 76'; Baku (yellow card) 51'; Bornauw (yellow card) 70'; Zesiger (yellow card) 80'; Majer 84'; Paredes (yellow card) 90+2'	Stadium: Weserstadion; Attendance: 41,500; Referee: Sascha Stegemann

7 April 2024 28	VfL Wolfsburg	1–3	Borussia Mönchengladbach	Wolfsburg
17:30 CEST (UTC+2)	Baku 7'; Bornauw (yellow card) 27'; Wimmer (yellow card) 45+1'	Report	Itakura 52'; Ngoumou 58'; Hack (yellow card) 84'; Reitz 88'; Omlin (yellow card) 90+3'	Stadium: Volkswagen Arena; Attendance: 26,105; Referee: Bastian Dankert

13 April 2024 29	RB Leipzig	3–0	VfL Wolfsburg	Leipzig
15:30 CEST (UTC+2)	Olmo 13'; Schlager (yellow card) 27'; Šeško 68'; Openda 82'; Simons (yellow card) 90+1'	Report	Fischer (yellow card) 25'; Behrens (yellow card) 25'; Jenz (yellow card) 35'; Svanberg (yellow card) 85'	Stadium: Red Bull Arena; Attendance: 45,858; Referee: Christian Dingert

20 April 2024 30	VfL Wolfsburg	1–0	VfL Bochum	Wolfsburg
15:30 CEST (UTC+2)	Bornauw (yellow card) 37'; Wind 43'; Tomás (yellow card) 53'; Paredes (yellow card) 68'; Vranckx (yellow card) 85'	Report	Osterhage (yellow card) 12'; Antwi-Adjei (yellow card) 86'; Stöger (yellow card) 90+5'	Stadium: Volkswagen Arena; Attendance: 26,327; Referee: Tobias Reichel

27 April 2024 31	SC Freiburg	1–2	VfL Wolfsburg	Freiburg
15:30 CEST (UTC+2)	Bornauw 42' (o.g.); Gregoritsch (yellow card) 55'; Sildillia (red card) 64'; Sallai (yellow card) 67', (penalty missed) 87'; Höfler (yellow card) 73'; Höler (yellow card) 90+2'	Report	Arnold (yellow card) 62', (goal) 82'; Lacroix 90'; Bornauw (yellow card) 90+3'	Stadium: Europa-Park Stadion; Attendance: 32,800; Referee: Frank Willenborg

4 May 2024 32	VfL Wolfsburg	3–0	Darmstadt 98	Wolfsburg
15:30 CEST (UTC+2)	Wimmer 8'; Wind 11'; Černý 90+3'	Report	Müller (yellow card) 7'; Maglica (yellow card) 32'; Zimmermann (yellow card) 90+1'	Stadium: Volkswagen Arena; Attendance: 23,108; Referee: Robert Hartmann

12 May 2024 33	Bayern Munich	2–0	VfL Wolfsburg	Munich
17:30 CEST (UTC+2)	Zvonarek 4'; Goretzka 13'	Report	Majer (yellow card) 53'; Lacroix (yellow card) 90+3'	Stadium: Allianz Arena; Attendance: 75,000; Referee: Bastian Dankert

18 May 2024 34	VfL Wolfsburg	1–3	Mainz 05	Wolfsburg
15:30 CEST (UTC+2)	Paredes 18'; Wimmer (yellow card) 52'; Majer (yellow card) 71'	Report	Lee (yellow card) 12'; Gruda 24'; Hanche-Olsen (yellow card) 54'; Van den Berg 72'; Burkardt 85'; Kohr (yellow card) 89'	Stadium: Volkswagen Arena; Attendance: 26,627; Referee: Frank Willenborg

=== DFB-Pokal ===
13 August 2023 First round	Makkabi Berlin	0–6	VfL Wolfsburg	Berlin
15:30 CEST (UTC+2)	Stahl (yellow card) 39'; Bruck (yellow card) 81'	Report	Svanberg (yellow card) 3'; Nmecha 8'; Wind 9', (yellow card) 76'; Tomás 53', 89'; Gerhardt 57'; Baku 79'	Stadium: Mommsenstadion; Attendance: 4,800; Referee: Riem Hussein

31 October 2023 Second round	VfL Wolfsburg	1–0	RB Leipzig	Wolfsburg
18:00 CET (UTC+1)	Černý 14'; Lacroix (yellow card) 43'; Vranckx (yellow card) 52'; Baku (yellow card) 70'; Pervan (yellow card) 82'; Paredes (yellow card) 84'	Report	Schlager (yellow card) 45+2'; Poulsen (yellow card) 42' (yellow-red card) 56'; Lukeba (yellow card) 64'; Simakan (yellow card) 90+7'	Stadium: Volkswagen Arena; Attendance: 16,031; Referee: Florian Badstübner

5 December 2023 Round of 16	Borussia Mönchengladbach	1–0 (a.e.t.)	VfL Wolfsburg	Mönchengladbach
20:45 CET (UTC+1)	Koné 120'	Report	Arnold (yellow card) 31'; Gerhardt (yellow card) 41'	Stadium: Borussia-Park; Attendance: 39,287; Referee: Bastian Dankert

== Statistics ==
=== Appearances and goals ===
No.	Pos	Nat	Player	Total		Bundesliga		DFB-Pokal	
No.	Pos	Nat	Player	Apps	Goals	Apps	Goals	Apps	Goals
Goalkeepers
1	GK	(Belgium) BEL	Koen Casteels	19	0	17	0	2	0
12	GK	(Austria) AUT	Pavao Pervan	5	0	4	0	1	0
30	GK	(Germany) GER	Niklas Klinger	0	0	0	0	0	0
Defenders
2	DF	(Germany) GER	Kilian Fischer	1	0	0+1	0	0	0
3	DF	(Belgium) BEL	Sebastiaan Bornauw	13	0	9+3	0	1	0
4	DF	(France) FRA	Maxence Lacroix	20	1	16+1	1	3	0
13	DF	(Brazil) BRA	Rogério	14	1	10+2	1	2	0
21	DF	(Denmark) DEN	Joakim Mæhle	23	1	19+1	1	2+1	0
25	DF	(Germany) GER	Moritz Jenz	15	0	13+1	0	1	0
33	DF	(Switzerland) SUI	Cédric Zesiger	17	0	11+3	0	3	0
Midfielders
6	MF	(Belgium) BEL	Aster Vranckx	17	0	9+6	0	2	0
7	MF	(Czech Republic) CZE	Václav Černý	20	4	11+6	3	2+1	1
16	MF	(Poland) POL	Jakub Kamiński	15	0	3+10	0	2	0
19	MF	(Croatia) CRO	Lovro Majer	23	4	18+3	4	0+2	0
20	MF	(Germany) GER	Ridle Baku	23	1	9+11	0	1+2	1
26	MF	(United States) USA	Ulysses Llanez	0	0	0	0	0	0
27	MF	(Germany) GER	Maximilian Arnold	20	1	14+3	1	1+2	0
31	MF	(Germany) GER	Yannick Gerhardt	18	2	9+6	1	3	1
32	MF	(Sweden) SWE	Mattias Svanberg	22	1	17+2	1	2+1	0
39	MF	(Austria) AUT	Patrick Wimmer	7	0	4+2	0	0+1	0
40	MF	(United States) USA	Kevin Paredes	18	2	6+11	2	0+1	0
41	MF	(Germany) GER	Kofi Amoako	2	0	0+2	0	0	0
Forwards
9	FW	(Sweden) SWE	Amin Sarr	6	0	0+6	0	0	0
10	FW	(Germany) GER	Lukas Nmecha	1	1	0	0	1	1
11	FW	(Portugal) POR	Tiago Tomás	20	3	6+11	1	2+1	2
17	FW	(Germany) GER	Kevin Behrens	2	0	2	0	0	0
18	FW	(Germany) GER	Dženan Pejčinović	3	0	0+3	0	0	0
23	FW	(Denmark) DEN	Jonas Wind	24	10	21	9	2+1	1
Players transferred out during the season
8	DF	(France) FRA	Nicolas Cozza	7	0	3+3	0	0+1	0
17	MF	(Germany) GER	Maximilian Philipp	0	0	0	0	0	0
35	GK	(Germany) GER	Philipp Schulze	0	0	0	0	0	0
36	MF	(Czech Republic) CZE	Lukáš Ambros	0	0	0	0	0	0
38	MF	(Croatia) CRO	Bartol Franjić	0	0	0	0	0	0
42	DF	(Germany) GER	Felix Lange	0	0	0	0	0	0

Last updated: 10 February 2024
Source: Competitions

=== Goalscorers ===
As of 2 March 2024

Rank	No.	Pos.	Nat.	Player	Bundesliga	DFB-Pokal	Total
1	23	FW	(Denmark)	Jonas Wind	9	1	10
2	19	MF	(Croatia)	Lovro Majer	4	0	4
2	7	MF	(Czech Republic)	Václav Černý	3	1	4
4	11	FW	(Portugal)	Tiago Tomás	1	2	3
4	31	MF	(Germany)	Yannick Gerhardt	2	1	3
6	40	MF	(United States)	Kevin Paredes	2	0	2
6	4	DF	(France)	Maxence Lacroix	2	0	2
6	21	DF	(Denmark)	Joakim Mæhle	2	0	2
6	10	FW	(Germany)	Lukas Nmecha	1	1	2
10	27	MF	(Germany)	Maximilian Arnold	1	0	1
10	20	MF	(Germany)	Ridle Baku	0	1	1
10	13	DF	(Brazil)	Rogério	1	0	1
10	32	MF	(Sweden)	Mattias Svanberg	1	0	1
10	17	FW	(Germany)	Kevin Behrens	1	0	1
Own goals					0	0	0
Totals					30	7	37
