= Kilian Fischer =

German footballer (born 2000)

Personal information
- Date of birth: 12 October 2000 (age 26)
- Place of birth: Miltenberg, Germany
- Height: 1.82 m (6 ft 0 in)
- Positions: Left-back; defensive midfielder; right-back

Team information
- Current team: VfL Wolfsburg
- Number: 2

Youth career
- TuS Bad Aibling
- –2017: 1860 Munich

Senior career*
| Years | Team | Apps | (Gls) |
| 2017–2019 | 1860 Munich II | 10 | (0) |
| 2019–2021 | Türkgücü München | 39 | (0) |
| 2021–2022 | 1. FC Nürnberg | 20 | (0) |
| 2021–2022 | 1. FC Nürnberg II | 2 | (0) |
| 2022– | VfL Wolfsburg | 64 | (1) |

International career^{‡}
| 2022–2023 | Germany U21 | 7 | (0) |
- * Club domestic league appearances and goals as of 18 September 2026 ‡ National team caps and goals as of 19:15, 28 June 2023 (UTC)

Kilian Fischer (born 12 October 2000) is a German professional footballer who plays as a left-back or defensive midfielder for 2. Bundesliga club VfL Wolfsburg.

== Career ==
Fischer joined Türkgücü München in July 2019 before extending his contract with the club the following summer.

On 10 June 2022, Fischer signed a five-year contract with VfL Wolfsburg.

== Career statistics ==
As of match played 18 September 2026

Appearances and goals by club, season and competition
| Club | Season | League | | | Cup | | Europe | | Other | | Total | |
| Club | Season | Division | Apps | Goals | Apps | Goals | Apps | Goals | Apps | Goals | Apps | Goals |
|---|---|---|---|---|---|---|---|---|---|---|---|---|
| TSV 1860 Munich II | 2017–18 | Bayernliga Süd | 6 | 0 | — | | — | | — | | 6 | 0 |
| TSV 1860 Munich II | 2018–19 | Bayernliga Süd | 4 | 0 | — | | — | | — | | 4 | 0 |
| TSV 1860 Munich II | Total | | 10 | 0 | — | | — | | — | | 10 | 0 |
| Türkgücü München | 2019–20 | Regionalliga Bayern | 13 | 0 | — | | — | | — | | 13 | 0 |
| Türkgücü München | 2020–21 | 3. Liga | 26 | 0 | — | | — | | — | | 26 | 0 |
| Türkgücü München | Total | | 39 | 0 | — | | — | | — | | 39 | 0 |
| Nürnberg | 2021–22 | 2. Bundesliga | 20 | 0 | 0 | 0 | — | | 0 | 0 | 20 | 0 |
| Nürnberg II | 2021–22 | Regionalliga Bayern | 2 | 0 | — | | — | | — | | 2 | 0 |
| Wolfsburg | 2022–23 | Bundesliga | 10 | 0 | 0 | 0 | — | | — | | 10 | 0 |
| Wolfsburg | 2023–24 | Bundesliga | 6 | 0 | 0 | 0 | — | | — | | 6 | 0 |
| Wolfsburg | 2024–25 | Bundesliga | 31 | 1 | 4 | 0 | — | | — | | 35 | 1 |
| Wolfsburg | 2025–26 | Bundesliga | 11 | 0 | 1 | 0 | — | | — | | 12 | 0 |
| Wolfsburg | 2026–27 | 2. Bundesliga | 6 | 0 | 1 | 0 | — | | — | | 7 | 0 |
| Wolfsburg | Total | | 64 | 1 | 6 | 0 | 0 | 0 | 0 | 0 | 70 | 1 |
| Career total | | | 135 | 1 | 6 | 0 | 0 | 0 | 0 | 0 | 141 | 1 |
