= Aster Vranckx =

Belgian footballer (born 2002)

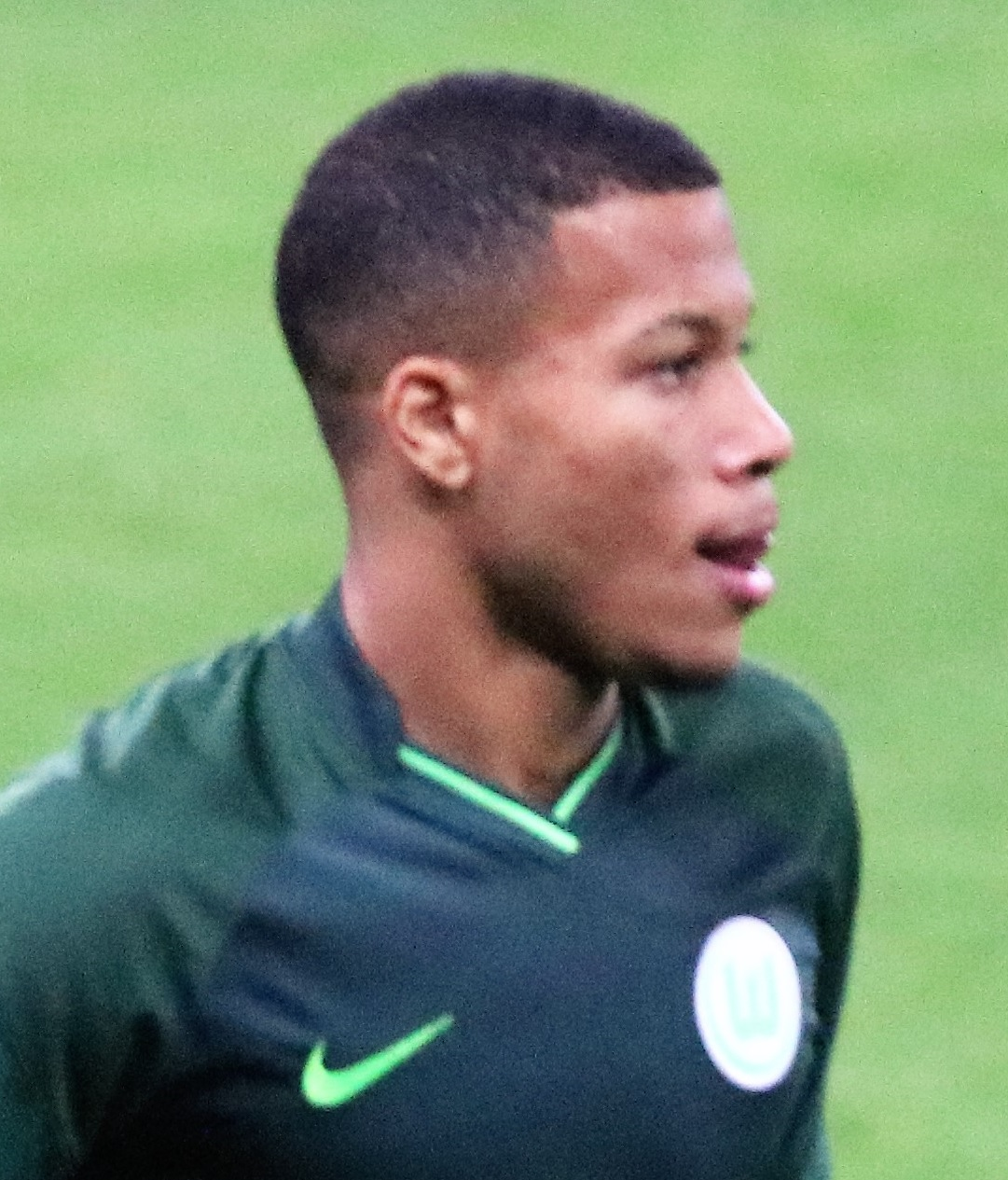
- Vranckx with VfL Wolfsburg in 2021

Personal information
- Full name: Aster Jan D. Vranckx
- Date of birth: 4 October 2002 (age 24)
- Place of birth: Kortenberg, Belgium
- Height: 1.83 m (6 ft 0 in)
- Position: Midfielder

Team information
- Current team: VfL Wolfsburg
- Number: 36

Youth career
- SC Hoegaarden
- KVK Tienen
- Woluwe-Zaventem
- Mechelen

Senior career*
Years	Team	Apps	(Gls)
2019–2021	Mechelen	43	(5)
2021–	VfL Wolfsburg	63	(2)
2022–2023	→ AC Milan (loan)	9	(0)
2025–2026	→ Sassuolo (loan)	16	(0)

International career^{‡}
2017	Belgium U15	2	(0)
2017	Belgium U16	2	(0)
2019–2020	Belgium U19	5	(0)
2021–2023	Belgium U21	12	(0)
2023–	Belgium	9	(0)
- * Club domestic league appearances and goals as of 25 May 2026 ‡ National team caps and goals as of 23:45, 14 October 2024 (UTC)

Aster Jan D. Vranckx (born 4 October 2002) is a Belgian professional footballer who plays as a midfielder for German 2. Bundesliga club VfL Wolfsburg and the Belgium national team.

== Club career ==
On 3 December 2018, Vranckx signed his first professional contract with KV Mechelen. Vranckx made his debut for Mechelen in the 2019 Belgian Super Cup, in a 3–0 loss to Genk. Vranckx announced on 9 December 2020 that he chose to play for VfL Wolfsburg after the ongoing season.

On 1 September 2022, Vranckx moved to Italy and joined Serie A club AC Milan on a season-long loan, with an option to buy.

On 22 August 2025, Vranck returned to Italy and signed with Sassuolo on loan, with an option to buy.

== International career ==
Born in Belgium to a Belgian father and Congolese mother, he is a youth international for Belgium.

In June 2023 he was called up to the senior Belgium squad for the UEFA Euro 2024 qualifying matches against Austria and Estonia on 17 and 20 June 2023 respectively.

== Career statistics ==
=== Club ===
As of match played 28 September 2025

Appearances and goals by club, season and competition
Club	Season	League			National cup		Continental		Other		Total	
Club	Season	Division	Apps	Goals	Apps	Goals	Apps	Goals	Apps	Goals	Apps	Goals
Mechelen	2019–20	Belgian Pro League	9	1	0	0	—		1	0	10	1
Mechelen	2020–21	Belgian Pro League	34	4	3	0	—		—		37	4
Mechelen	Total		43	5	3	0	0	0	1	0	47	5
VfL Wolfsburg	2021–22	Bundesliga	24	2	0	0	4	0	—		28	2
VfL Wolfsburg	2022–23	Bundesliga	1	0	0	0	—		—		1	0
VfL Wolfsburg	2023–24	Bundesliga	24	0	2	0	—		—		26	0
VfL Wolfsburg	2024–25	Bundesliga	14	0	1	0	—		—		15	0
VfL Wolfsburg	Total		63	2	3	0	4	0	1	0	70	2
AC Milan (loan)	2022–23	Serie A	9	0	1	0	0	0	0	0	10	0
Sassuolo (loan)	2025–26	Serie A	4	0	0	0	—		—		4	0
Career total			119	7	7	0	4	0	1	0	131	7

=== International ===
As of match played 14 October 2024

Appearances and goals by national team and year
National team	Year	Apps	Goals
Belgium	2023	4	0
Belgium	2024	5	0
Total		9	0
