= Mattias Svanberg =

Swedish footballer (born 1999)

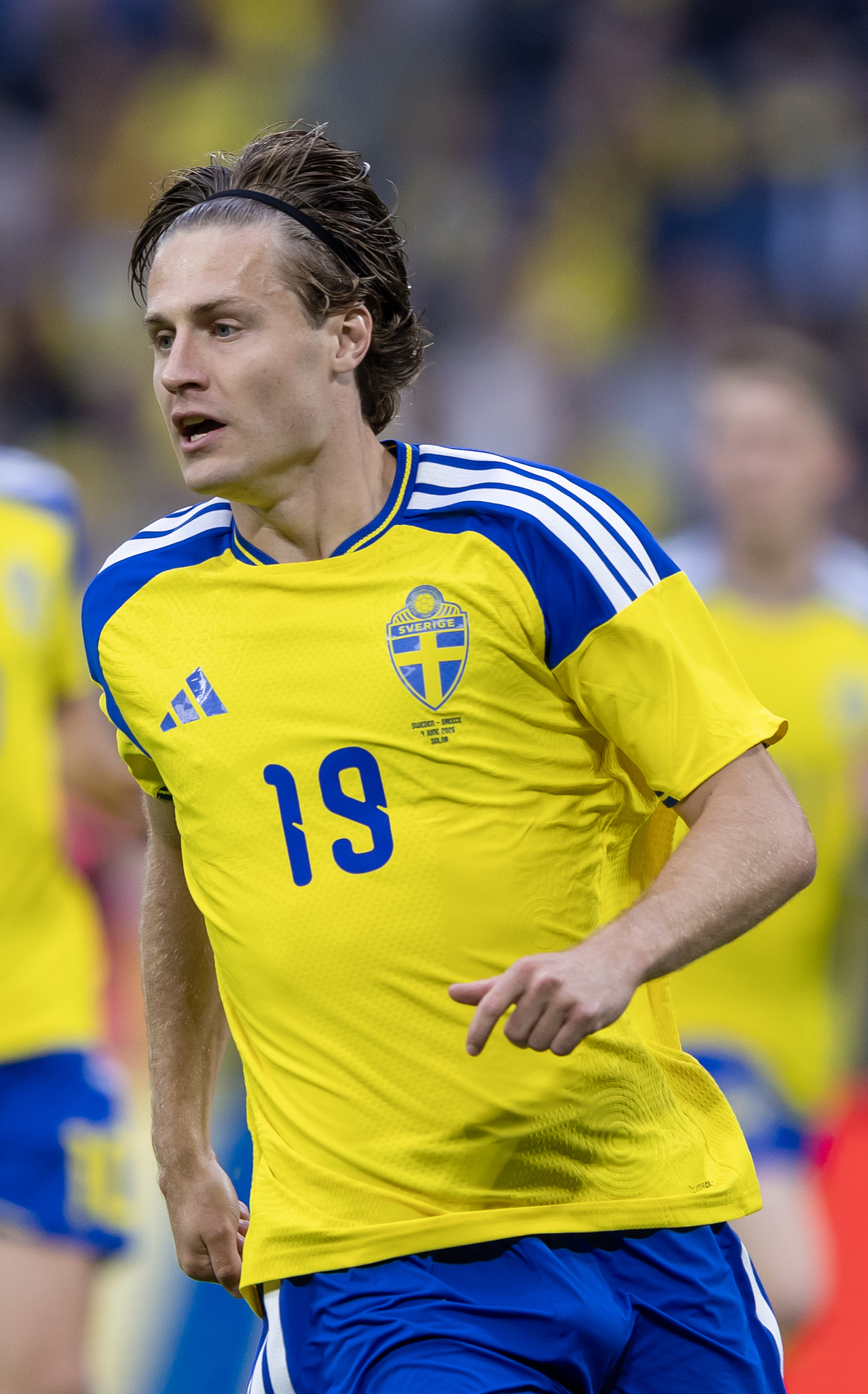
- Svanberg with Sweden in 2026

Personal information
- Full name: Mattias Olof Svanberg
- Date of birth: 5 January 1999 (age 27)
- Place of birth: Malmö, Sweden
- Height: 1.86 m (6 ft 1 in)
- Position: Midfielder

Team information
- Current team: VfL Wolfsburg
- Number: 32

Youth career
- –2007: Bunkeflo IF
- 2008–2012: LB07
- 2013–2015: Malmö FF

Senior career*
Years	Team	Apps	(Gls)
2015–2018	Malmö FF	36	(5)
2018–2022	Bologna	118	(9)
2022–	VfL Wolfsburg	106	(12)

International career^{‡}
2014–2016	Sweden U17	20	(2)
2016–2017	Sweden U19	7	(1)
2017–2019	Sweden U21	14	(3)
2019–	Sweden	43	(3)
- * Club domestic league appearances and goals as of 22:30, 12 September 2026 (UTC) ‡ National team caps and goals as of 16:00, 1 July 2026 (UTC)

Mattias Olof Svanberg (born 5 January 1999) is a Swedish professional footballer who plays as a midfielder for 2. Bundesliga club VfL Wolfsburg and the Sweden national team.

== Club career ==
=== Malmo FF ===
After playing for LB07 and Malmö FF youth teams Mattias Svanberg signed an apprenticeship contract with Malmö FF on 27 July 2015. As a 16-year-old, he featured on the bench four times during the 2015 season. On 4 March 2016, he signed a four-year first team contract with Malmö. He made his Allsvenskan debut on 28 May 2016 when he came on as a substitute in the 82nd minute in a 4–1 win against Östersunds FK, and assisted on Viðar Örn Kjartansson's goal in stoppage time. On 25 September 2016, he scored his first Allsvenskan goal in the local derby against Helsingborgs IF. He started his first game for the club on 26 October 2016, and scored a goal and an assist as Malmö FF beat Falkenbergs FF to secure the Allsvenskan title.

=== Bologna ===
In 2017, Svanberg received a larger role with the team and made 21 appearances as MFF won the championship for a second consecutive year. In 2018, Svanberg became a consistent starter and was one of only two players to feature in every match during the spring before moving to Serie A club Bologna in the summer transfer window for a sum of €5 million.

He made his Serie A debut on 16 September 2018 in a 0–1 defeat against Genoa.

=== Wolfsburg ===
On 16 July 2022, Bundesliga club VfL Wolfsburg announced the signing of Svanberg on a five-year deal.

== International career ==
Svanberg was called up to the senior Sweden squad for games against Turkey and Russia in November 2018, but did not play.

In November 2019, Svanberg was called up for Sweden's UEFA Euro 2020 qualification matches against Romania and Faroe Islands. On 18 November Svanberg scored on his debut against Faroe Islands at Friends Arena in Solna. He also assisted John Guidetti in a 3–0 win for the home side.

Svanberg was called up for a major tournament for the first time when he was included in Sweden's 26-man squad for UEFA Euro 2020.

On 12 May 2026, Svanberg was named in the Sweden squad for the 2026 FIFA World Cup. He came off the bench in their opener against Tunisia and scored within 60 seconds on the pitch to make it 4–1 in an eventual 5–1 victory.

== Personal life ==
Svanberg is the son of the former professional ice hockey player Bo Svanberg.

== Career statistics ==
=== Club ===
As of match played 12 September 2026

Appearances and goals by club, season and competition
Club	Season	League			National cup (Note: Includes Svenska Cupen, Coppa Italia, DFB-Pokal)		Europe		Other		Total	
Club	Season	Division	Apps	Goals	Apps	Goals	Apps	Goals	Apps	Goals	Apps	Goals
Malmö FF	2016	Allsvenskan	6	2	2	0	—		—		8	2
Malmö FF	2017	Allsvenskan	18	1	1	0	2 (Note: Appearances in UEFA Champions League)	0	—		21	1
Malmö FF	2018	Allsvenskan	12	2	6	1	0	0	—		18	3
Malmö FF	Total		36	5	9	1	2	0	—		47	6
Bologna	2018–19	Serie A	23	0	1	0	—		—		24	0
Bologna	2019–20	Serie A	25	1	2	0	—		—		27	1
Bologna	2020–21	Serie A	34	5	1	0	—		—		35	5
Bologna	2021–22	Serie A	36	3	1	0	—		—		37	3
Bologna	Total		118	9	5	0	—		—		123	9
VfL Wolfsburg	2022–23	Bundesliga	32	4	3	1	—		—		35	5
VfL Wolfsburg	2023–24	Bundesliga	25	1	3	0	—		—		28	1
VfL Wolfsburg	2024–25	Bundesliga	20	3	3	0	—		—		23	3
VfL Wolfsburg	2025–26	Bundesliga	24	3	2	2	—		2 (Note: Appearances in Bundesliga relegation play-offs)	0	28	5
VfL Wolfsburg	2026–27	2. Bundesliga	5	1	1	0	—		—		6	1
VfL Wolfsburg	Total		106	12	12	3	—		2	0	120	15
Career total			260	26	26	4	2	0	2	0	290	30

=== International ===
As of match played 30 June 2026

Appearances and goals by national team and year
National team	Year	Apps	Goals
Sweden	2019	1	1
Sweden	2020	3	0
Sweden	2021	12	0
Sweden	2022	9	1
Sweden	2023	7	0
Sweden	2024	3	0
Sweden	2025	2	0
Sweden	2026	6	1
Total		43	3

Scores and results list Sweden's goal tally first, score column indicates score after each Svanberg goal.

List of international goals scored by Mattias Svanberg
No.	Date	Venue	Cap	Opponent	Score	Result	Competition	Ref.
1	18 November 2019	Friends Arena, Solna, Sweden	1	Faroe Islands	2–0	3–0	UEFA Euro 2020 qualifying	
2	16 November 2022	Estadi Montilivi, Girona, Spain	24	Mexico	2–1	2–1	Friendly	
3	14 June 2026	Estadio BBVA, Guadalupe, Mexico	42	Tunisia	4–1	5–1	2026 FIFA World Cup	

== Honours ==
Malmö FF

- Allsvenskan: 2016, 2017
