= Koen Casteels =

Belgian footballer (born 1992)

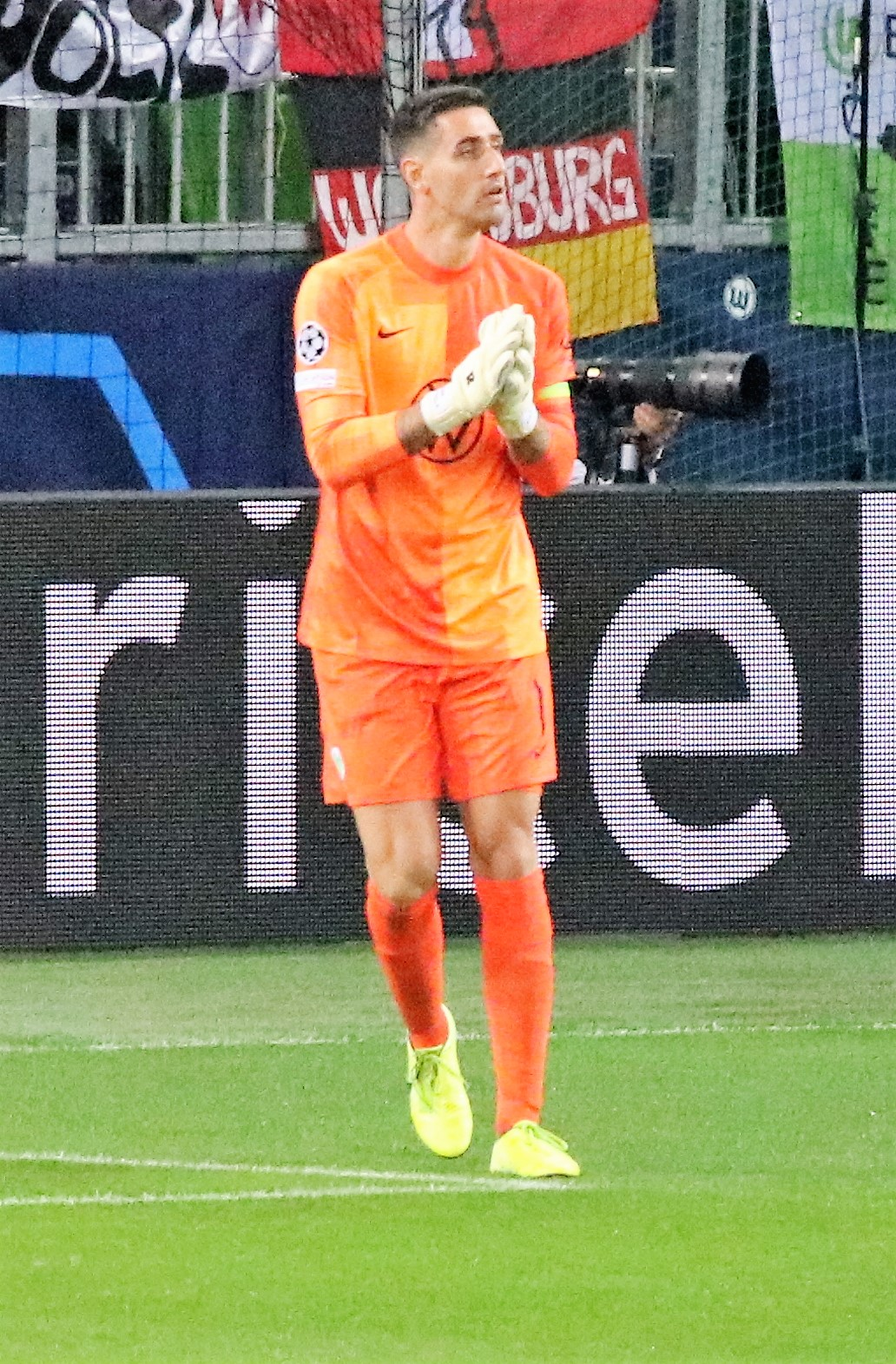
- Casteels playing for VfL Wolfsburg in 2021

Personal information
- Full name: Koen Casteels
- Date of birth: 25 June 1992 (age 34)
- Place of birth: Bonheiden, Belgium
- Height: 1.97 m (6 ft 6 in)
- Position: Goalkeeper

Team information
- Current team: Al-Qadsiah
- Number: 1

Youth career
- 1996–2002: KAC Betekom
- 2002–2009: Genk

Senior career*
| Years | Team | Apps | (Gls) |
| 2009–2011 | Genk | 0 | (0) |
| 2011–2014 | TSG Hoffenheim II | 32 | (0) |
| 2011–2015 | TSG Hoffenheim | 39 | (0) |
| 2015 | → Werder Bremen (loan) | 6 | (0) |
| 2015–2024 | VfL Wolfsburg | 238 | (0) |
| 2024– | Al-Qadsiah | 73 | (0) |

International career
| 2007 | Belgium U15 | 2 | (0) |
| 2008 | Belgium U16 | 3 | (0) |
| 2008–2009 | Belgium U17 | 3 | (0) |
| 2009–2011 | Belgium U19 | 20 | (0) |
| 2011–2013 | Belgium U21 | 9 | (0) |
| 2020–2024 | Belgium | 20 | (0) |
Medal record
Men's football
Representing Belgium
FIFA World Cup
| Third place | 2018 Russia |
- * Club domestic league appearances and goals as of 20 October 2026 (UTC)

Koen Casteels (Dutch pronunciation: [ˈkun kɑsˈteːls]; born 25 June 1992) is a Belgian professional footballer who plays as a goalkeeper for Saudi Pro League club Al-Qadsiah.

Formed at Genk, Casteels spent most of his professional career in Germany with TSG Hoffenheim, Werder Bremen (loan) and VfL Wolfsburg, joining the latter in 2015. He made 283 total Bundesliga appearances, mostly for Wolfsburg, where he won the 2015 DFL-Supercup. In 2024, he departed Wolfsburg, joining Saudi side Al-Qadsiah.

Casteels made 37 appearances for Belgium up to under-21 level. He was first called up for the senior team in 2013 and was part of their squad that came third at the 2018 FIFA World Cup. He was later chosen for the 2022 FIFA World Cup and UEFA Euro 2024, and was first-choice at the latter. He retired from international football in March 2025, following a dispute relating to Thibaut Courtois.

== Club career ==
Casteels was developed at K.R.C. Genk where he was a teammate of fellow goalkeeper Thibaut Courtois. He was initially regarded as better than Courtois, but while he and several of the club's other goalkeepers were injured, Courtois broke into the team.

Casteels was signed by VfL Wolfsburg from TSG Hoffenheim in January 2015, but spent the first six months of the three-and-a-half-year contract on loan at Werder Bremen. He played for Wolfsburg in the 2015 DFL-Supercup, saving from Xabi Alonso in the penalty shoot-out as his team won after a 1–1 draw.

When Diego Benaglio left Wolfsburg in June 2017, Casteels signed a new three-year contract with the club and was given the number 1 shirt. He appeared in all of the club's 34 Bundesliga matches during the 2017−18 season.

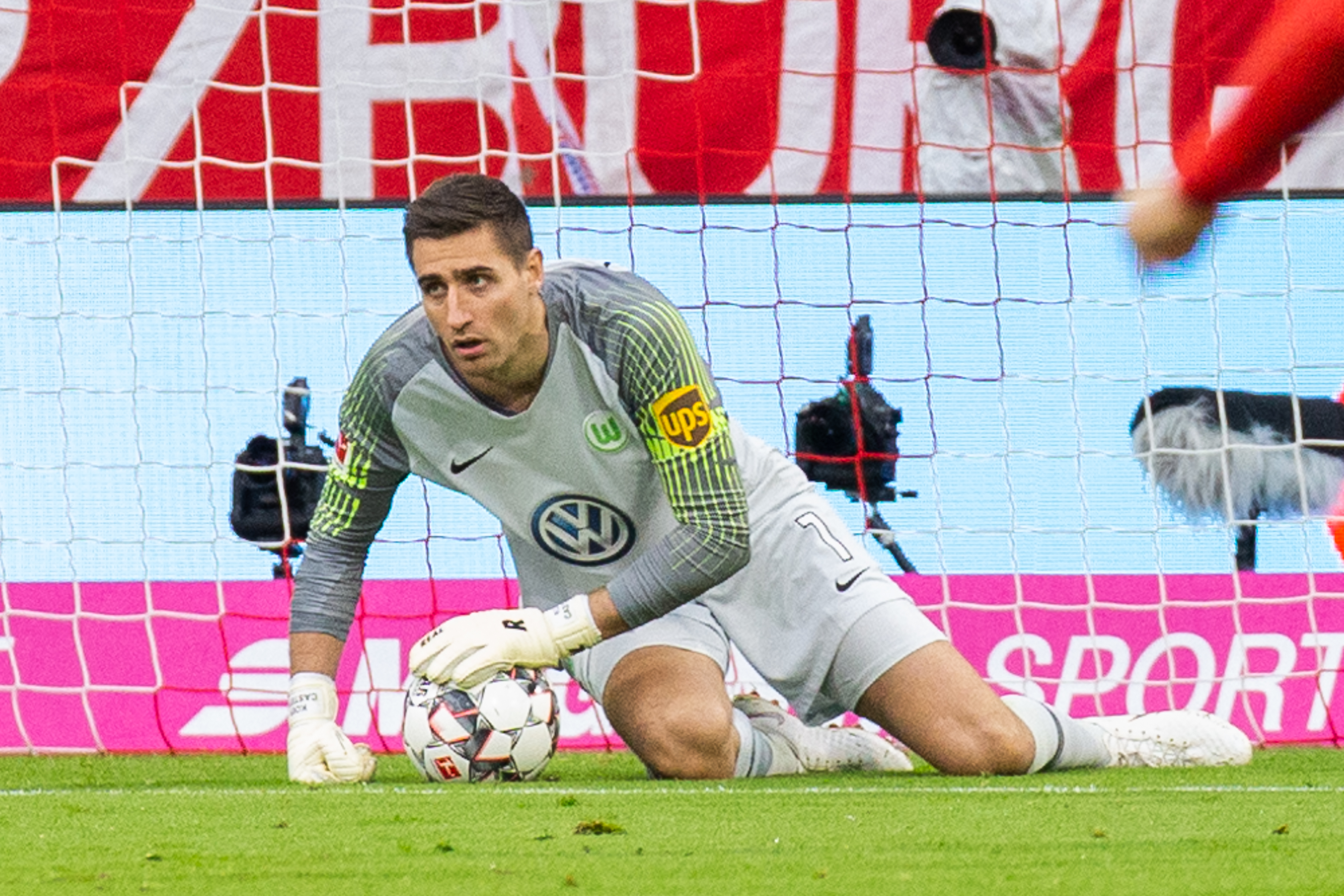
Casteels in action for Wolfsburg against Bayern Munich, March 2019

On 2 September 2023, Casteels announced that he would leave Wolfsburg at the end of the 2023−24 Bundesliga season.

On 10 June 2024, Casteels joined newly promoted Saudi Pro League club Al-Qadsiah on a three-year contract. He won the league's Golden Glove in his first season, having kept 14 clean sheets.

== International career ==
Casteels was first called up to the senior Belgium team in May 2013. He was going to be part of Belgium's 2014 FIFA World Cup squad but failed to recover from an injury and was replaced by Silvio Proto and then Sammy Bossut.

Manager Roberto Martínez often chose four goalkeepers in his international selections, and as the 2018 FIFA World Cup only permitted three, Casteels battled with Matz Sels for the final space behind Thibaut Courtois and Simon Mignolet. He was eventually chosen for the final 23-man squad to go to Russia.

Casteels made his full international debut on 8 September 2020, in a 5–1 win over Iceland for the UEFA Nations League.

Casteels was part of the Belgium squad at the 2022 FIFA World Cup, but again did not play a minute.

After Courtois fell out with national team coach Domenico Tedesco, Casteels was chosen as first choice, with Tedesco describing him as one of the best in the world. Casteels played in all of Belgium's games at UEFA Euro 2024 and impressed, making important saves and also recording an assist in their 2–0 win over Romania.

On 10 March 2025, Casteels announced that he had quit the national team in frustration over the decision to bring Courtois back into the squad.

== Career statistics ==
=== Club ===
As of match played 20 October 2026

Appearances and goals by club, season and competition
| Club | Season | League | | | National cup (Note: Includes DFB-Pokal, King's Cup) | | Continental | | Other | | Total | |
| Club | Season | Division | Apps | Goals | Apps | Goals | Apps | Goals | Apps | Goals | Apps | Goals |
|---|---|---|---|---|---|---|---|---|---|---|---|---|
| Genk | 2008–09 | Belgian First Division | 0 | 0 | 0 | 0 | — | | — | | 0 | 0 |
| Genk | 2009–10 | Belgian Pro League | 0 | 0 | 0 | 0 | 0 | 0 | 0 | 0 | 0 | 0 |
| Genk | 2010–11 | Belgian Pro League | 0 | 0 | 0 | 0 | 0 | 0 | — | | 0 | 0 |
| Genk | Total | | 0 | 0 | 0 | 0 | 0 | 0 | 0 | 0 | 32 | 0 |
| TSG Hoffenheim II | 2011–12 | Regionalliga Süd | 23 | 0 | — | | — | | — | | 23 | 0 |
| TSG Hoffenheim II | 2012–13 | Regionalliga Südwest | 7 | 0 | — | | — | | — | | 7 | 0 |
| TSG Hoffenheim II | 2014–15 | Regionalliga Südwest | 2 | 0 | — | | — | | — | | 2 | 0 |
| TSG Hoffenheim II | Total | | 32 | 0 | — | | — | | — | | 32 | 0 |
| TSG Hoffenheim | 2011–12 | Bundesliga | 0 | 0 | 0 | 0 | — | | — | | 0 | 0 |
| TSG Hoffenheim | 2012–13 | Bundesliga | 16 | 0 | 0 | 0 | — | | 2 (Note: Appearances in Bundesliga relegation play-offs) | 0 | 18 | 0 |
| TSG Hoffenheim | 2013–14 | Bundesliga | 23 | 0 | 2 | 0 | — | | — | | 25 | 0 |
| TSG Hoffenheim | Total | | 39 | 0 | 2 | 0 | — | | 2 | 0 | 43 | 0 |
| Werder Bremen (loan) | 2014–15 | Bundesliga | 6 | 0 | 1 | 0 | — | | — | | 7 | 0 |
| VfL Wolfsburg | 2015–16 | Bundesliga | 13 | 0 | 1 | 0 | 2 (Note: Appearances in UEFA Champions League) | 0 | 1 (Note: Appearance in DFL-Supercup) | 0 | 17 | 0 |
| VfL Wolfsburg | 2016–17 | Bundesliga | 20 | 0 | 2 | 0 | — | | 2 | 0 | 24 | 0 |
| VfL Wolfsburg | 2017–18 | Bundesliga | 34 | 0 | 3 | 0 | — | | 2 | 0 | 39 | 0 |
| VfL Wolfsburg | 2018–19 | Bundesliga | 26 | 0 | 3 | 0 | — | | — | | 29 | 0 |
| VfL Wolfsburg | 2019–20 | Bundesliga | 26 | 0 | 1 | 0 | 5 (Note: Appearances in UEFA Europa League) | 0 | — | | 32 | 0 |
| VfL Wolfsburg | 2020–21 | Bundesliga | 32 | 0 | 3 | 0 | 2 | 0 | — | | 37 | 0 |
| VfL Wolfsburg | 2021–22 | Bundesliga | 28 | 0 | 1 | 0 | 5 | 0 | — | | 34 | 0 |
| VfL Wolfsburg | 2022–23 | Bundesliga | 34 | 0 | 2 | 0 | — | | — | | 36 | 0 |
| VfL Wolfsburg | 2023–24 | Bundesliga | 25 | 0 | 2 | 0 | — | | — | | 27 | 0 |
| VfL Wolfsburg | Total | | 238 | 0 | 18 | 0 | 14 | 0 | 5 | 0 | 275 | 0 |
| Al-Qadsiah | 2024–25 | Saudi Pro League | 33 | 0 | 4 | 0 | — | | — | | 37 | 0 |
| Al-Qadsiah | 2025–26 | Saudi Pro League | 32 | 0 | 3 | 0 | — | | 1 (Note: Appearance in Saudi Super Cup) | 0 | 36 | 0 |
| Al-Qadsiah | 2026–27 | Saudi Pro League | 8 | 0 | 0 | 0 | 2 (Note: Appearances in AFC Champions League Elite) | 0 | 0 | 0 | 10 | 0 |
| Al-Qadsiah | Total | | 73 | 0 | 7 | 0 | 2 | 0 | 1 | 0 | 83 | 0 |
| Career total | | | 388 | 0 | 28 | 0 | 16 | 0 | 8 | 0 | 437 | 0 |

=== International ===
As of match played 17 November 2024

Appearances and goals by national team and year
| National team | Year | Apps | Goals |
|---|---|---|---|
| Belgium | 2020 | 1 | 0 |
| Belgium | 2021 | 2 | 0 |
| Belgium | 2022 | 1 | 0 |
| Belgium | 2023 | 4 | 0 |
| Belgium | 2024 | 12 | 0 |
| Total | | 20 | 0 |

== Honours ==
Genk

- Belgian First Division: 2010–11
- Belgian Cup: 2008–09

VfL Wolfsburg

- DFL-Supercup: 2015

Belgium

- FIFA World Cup third place: 2018

Individual

- kicker Best Goalkeeper of the Bundesliga: 2017–18
- Saudi Pro League Golden Glove: 2024–25
