= Jakub Kamiński =

Polish footballer (born 2002)

Personal information
- Full name: Jakub Piotr Kamiński
- Date of birth: 5 June 2002 (age 24)
- Place of birth: Ruda Śląska, Poland
- Height: 1.79 m (5 ft 10 in)
- Positions: Wide midfielder; winger; wing-back

Team information
- Current team: Benfica
- Number: 13

Youth career
- 2010–2015: Szombierki Bytom
- 2015–2019: Lech Poznań

Senior career*
| Years | Team | Apps | (Gls) |
| 2019 | Lech Poznań II | 17 | (5) |
| 2019–2022 | Lech Poznań | 85 | (14) |
| 2022–2026 | VfL Wolfsburg | 70 | (4) |
| 2025–2026 | → 1. FC Köln (loan) | 34 | (7) |
| 2026 | 1. FC Köln | 0 | (0) |
| 2026– | Benfica | 1 | (0) |

International career^{‡}
| 2017–2018 | Poland U16 | 13 | (4) |
| 2018–2019 | Poland U17 | 8 | (0) |
| 2019 | Poland U19 | 7 | (0) |
| 2020–2024 | Poland U21 | 16 | (3) |
| 2021– | Poland | 32 | (3) |
- * Club domestic league appearances and goals as of 07:52, 17 September 2026 (UTC) ‡ National team caps and goals as of 25 September 2026

Jakub Piotr Kamiński (born 5 June 2002) is a Polish professional footballer who plays as a winger or wide midfielder for Primeira Liga club Benfica and the Poland national team.

== Club career ==
=== Lech Poznań ===
As a junior, he started his career in Szombierki Bytom, before joining Lech Poznań's academy in 2015. Climbing through the ranks with junior squads and the reserve team, he was first included in the first team roster in early 2019 by Adam Nawałka.

Kamiński made his Ekstraklasa debut on 20 September 2019 in a 1–1 home draw against Jagiellonia Białystok, in the starting line-up. His first league goal came in a 3–3 away draw against Zagłębie Lubin on 6 June 2020. On 16 September 2020, he scored his first goal in European competitions against Hammarby IF in a 3–0 Europa League qualifying round away win. Following a successful 2021–22 campaign, which saw Lech win the championship on the club's 100th anniversary, Kaminśki was voted Ekstraklasa's Young Player of the Season.

=== VfL Wolfsburg ===
On 10 January 2022, Kamiński signed a five-year contract with Bundesliga club VfL Wolfsburg, effective from 1 July 2022. He debuted in a 2022–23 DFB-Pokal match against Eintracht Braunschweig, scoring the 2–1 winning goal. On 8 March 2023, Kamiński made his Bundesliga debut in a 4–2 defeat against Bayern Munich whilst scoring his first league goal as well.

=== Köln ===
On 4 July 2025, Kamiński was sent on a season-long loan to fellow Bundesliga club 1. FC Köln. Kamiński scored three goals in his first five matches for Köln.

On 28 May 2026, Köln activated their €5.5 million buy option and signed Kamiński on a permanent basis.

=== Benfica ===
On 7 July 2026, Primeira Liga club Benfica announced the signing of Kamiński on a five-year deal, for a fee reported to be €20 million.

== International career ==
On 5 September 2021, Kamiński debuted as a starter for the Polish senior squad in an away 2022 FIFA World Cup qualification against San Marino, ending in a 7–1 victory for the Poles. He scored his first goal against Wales in a 2022–23 UEFA Nations League A match on 1 June 2022.

== Career statistics ==
=== Club ===
As of match played 16 September 2026

Appearances and goals by club, season and competition
| Club | Season | League | | | National cup (Note: Includes Polish Cup, DFB-Pokal) | | League cup | | Europe | | Total | |
| Club | Season | Division | Apps | Goals | Apps | Goals | Apps | Goals | Apps | Goals | Apps | Goals |
|---|---|---|---|---|---|---|---|---|---|---|---|---|
| Lech Poznań II | 2018–19 | III liga, gr. II | 11 | 3 | — | | — | | — | | 11 | 3 |
| Lech Poznań II | 2019–20 | II liga | 6 | 2 | — | | — | | — | | 6 | 2 |
| Lech Poznań II | Total | | 17 | 5 | — | | — | | — | | 17 | 5 |
| Lech Poznań | 2019–20 | Ekstraklasa | 24 | 4 | 4 | 0 | — | | — | | 28 | 4 |
| Lech Poznań | 2020–21 | Ekstraklasa | 28 | 1 | 3 | 0 | — | | 7 (Note: Appearances in UEFA Europa League) | 2 | 38 | 3 |
| Lech Poznań | 2021–22 | Ekstraklasa | 33 | 9 | 3 | 0 | — | | — | | 36 | 9 |
| Lech Poznań | Total | | 85 | 14 | 10 | 0 | — | | 7 | 2 | 102 | 16 |
| VfL Wolfsburg | 2022–23 | Bundesliga | 31 | 4 | 2 | 1 | — | | — | | 33 | 5 |
| VfL Wolfsburg | 2023–24 | Bundesliga | 17 | 0 | 2 | 0 | — | | — | | 19 | 0 |
| VfL Wolfsburg | 2024–25 | Bundesliga | 22 | 0 | 4 | 0 | — | | — | | 26 | 0 |
| VfL Wolfsburg | Total | | 70 | 4 | 8 | 1 | — | | — | | 78 | 5 |
| 1. FC Köln (loan) | 2025–26 | Bundesliga | 34 | 7 | 2 | 0 | — | | — | | 36 | 7 |
| Benfica | 2026–27 | Primeira Liga | 1 | 0 | 0 | 0 | 0 | 0 | 6 | 1 | 7 | 1 |
| Career total | | | 207 | 30 | 20 | 1 | 0 | 0 | 13 | 3 | 240 | 34 |

=== International ===
As of match played 25 September 2026

Appearances and goals by national team and year
| National team | Year | Apps | Goals |
|---|---|---|---|
Poland
| Poland | 2021 | 1 | 0 |
| Poland | 2022 | 7 | 1 |
| Poland | 2023 | 6 | 0 |
| Poland | 2024 | 4 | 0 |
| Poland | 2025 | 9 | 2 |
| Poland | 2026 | 5 | 0 |
| Total | | 32 | 3 |

Scores and results list Poland's goal tally first, score column indicates score after each Kamiński goal.

List of international goals scored by Jakub Kamiński
| No. | Date | Venue | Opponent | Score | Result | Competition |
|---|---|---|---|---|---|---|
| 1 | 1 June 2022 | Stadion Wrocław, Wrocław, Poland | Wales | 1–1 | 2–1 | 2022–23 UEFA Nations League A |
| 2 | 7 September 2025 | Silesian Stadium, Chorzów, Poland | Finland | 3–0 | 3–1 | 2026 FIFA World Cup qualification |
| 3 | 14 November 2025 | Stadion Narodowy, Warsaw, Poland | Netherlands | 1–0 | 1–1 | 2026 FIFA World Cup qualification |

== Honours ==
Lech Poznań II

- III liga, group II: 2018–19

Lech Poznań

- Ekstraklasa: 2021–22

Individual

- Ekstraklasa Best Player: 2021
- Ekstraklasa Young Player of the Season: 2021–22
- Ekstraklasa Player of the Month: October 2021
- Ekstraklasa Young Player of the Month: July 2021, October 2021
