= Pavao Pervan =

Austrian footballer (born 1987)

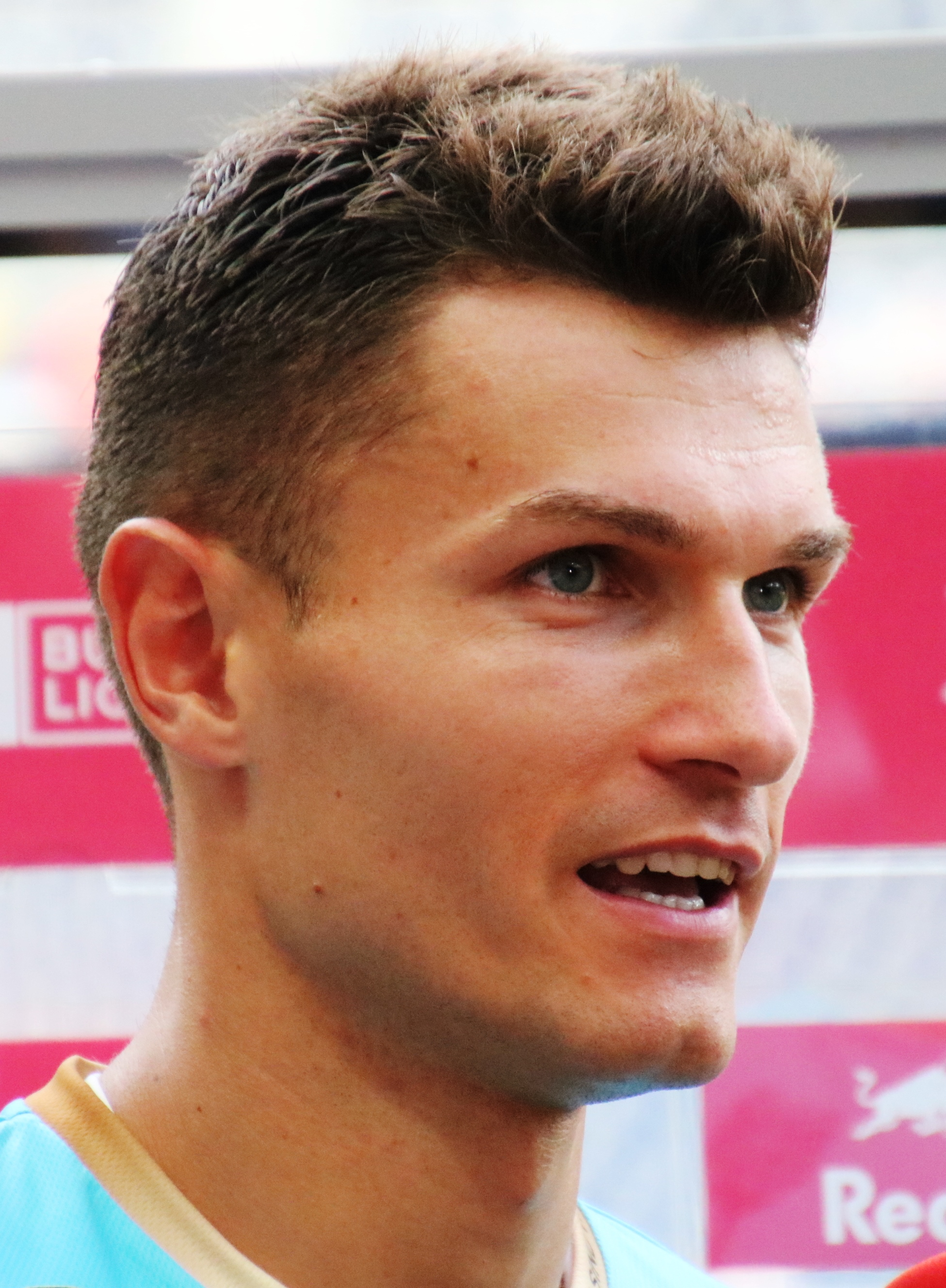
- Pervan with LASK in 2017

Personal information
- Date of birth: 13 November 1987 (age 38)
- Place of birth: Livno, SR Bosnia and Herzegovina, Yugoslavia
- Height: 1.94 m (6 ft 4 in)
- Position: Goalkeeper

Team information
- Current team: VfL Wolfsburg
- Number: 12

Youth career
- 1997–2000: Favoritner AC
- 2000–2004: Team Wiener Linien

Senior career*
Years	Team	Apps	(Gls)
2004–2005	Gaswerk/Straßenbahn		
2005–2007	SV Schwechat	2	(0)
2007–2010	FC Lustenau 07	30	(0)
2010	FC Pasching	10	(0)
2010–2018	LASK II	88	(0)
2010–2018	LASK	179	(0)
2018–	VfL Wolfsburg	34	(0)

International career
2017–2022	Austria	7	(0)
- * Club domestic league appearances and goals as of 21 May 2024

Pavao Pervan (Croatian pronunciation: [pâʋao pêrʋan]; born 13 November 1987) is an Austrian professional footballer who plays as a goalkeeper for 2. Bundesliga club VfL Wolfsburg.

== Club career ==
Born in Livno, SR Bosnia and Herzegovina, Pervan began his youth career with local Austrian football side Favoritner AC, before coming up professionally to sign for fellow Austrian team SV Schwechat in 2005.

After appearing sparingly for the side over two seasons, he joined FC Lustenau 07 in 2007. After appearing more consistently for Lustenau, Pervan joined Austrian Bundesliga side LASK in 2010. From there, he cemented his status as first-choice goalkeeper for LASK, making over 170 league appearances.

In the summer of 2018, Pervan moved to Germany, joining Bundesliga club VfL Wolfsburg. In April 2025, he signed a new contract with the club.

== International career ==
He was first called up for Austria national team in November 2017, but remained on the bench in his first 10 call ups to the squad. He made his senior debut on 19 November 2019 in a Euro 2020 qualifier against Latvia which Austria lost 0–1. He has, as of April 2021, earned a total of 7 caps as a goalkeeper for Austria.

== Career statistics ==
As of match played 20 April 2024

Appearances and goals by club, season and competition
Club	Season	League			National cup (Note: Includes Austrian Cup, DFB-Pokal)		Europe		Other		Total	
Club	Season	Division	Apps	Goals	Apps	Goals	Apps	Goals	Apps	Goals	Apps	Goals
SV Schwechat	2006–07	Austrian Regionalliga East	2	0	—		—		—		2	0
Lustenau	2007–08	Eerste Liga	21	0	0	0	—		—		21	0
Lustenau	2008–09	Eerste Liga	9	0	1	0	—		—		10	0
Lustenau	2009–10	Eerste Liga	0	0	2	0	—		—		2	0
Lustenau	Total		30	0	3	0	—		—		33	0
Juniors OÖ	2009–10	Austrian Regionalliga Central	10	0	—		—		—		10	0
LASK II	2010–11	Austrian Regionalliga Central	16	0	—		—		—		16	0
LASK II	2011–12	Austrian Regionalliga Central	15	0	—		—		—		15	0
LASK II	2012–13	Austrian Regionalliga Central	28	0	—		—		—		28	0
LASK II	2013–14	Austrian Regionalliga Central	29	0	—		—		—		29	0
LASK II	Total		88	0	—		—		—		88	0
LASK	2010–11	Austrian Bundesliga	2	0	1	0	—		—		3	0
LASK	2011–12	Eerste Liga	1	0	3	0	—		—		4	0
LASK	2012–13	Eerste Liga	26	0	3	0	—		2 (Note: Appearances in Relegation playoffs)	0	31	0
LASK	2013–14	Eerste Liga	27	0	2	0	—		2	0	31	0
LASK	2014–15	Eerste Liga	36	0	3	0	—		—		39	0
LASK	2015–16	Eerste Liga	35	0	4	0	—		—		39	0
LASK	2016–17	Eerste Liga	17	0	3	0	—		—		20	0
LASK	2017–18	Austrian Bundesliga	35	0	3	0	—		—		38	0
LASK	Total		179	0	22	0	—		4	0	205	0
Wolfsburg	2018–19	Bundesliga	9	0	0	0	—		—		9	0
Wolfsburg	2019–20	Bundesliga	8	0	1	0	5 (Note: Appearance(s) in UEFA Europa League)	0	—		14	0
Wolfsburg	2020–21	Bundesliga	2	0	1	0	1	0	—		4	0
Wolfsburg	2021–22	Bundesliga	6	0	0	0	1 (Note: Appearance(s) in UEFA Champions League)	0	—		7	0
Wolfsburg	2022–23	Bundesliga	0	0	1	0	—		—		1	0
Wolfsburg	2023–24	Bundesliga	9	0	1	0	—		—		10	0
Wolfsburg	2024–25	Bundesliga	0	0	0	0	—		—		0	0
Wolfsburg	2025–26	Bundesliga	0	0	0	0	—		—		0	0
Wolfsburg	Total		34	0	4	0	7	0	—		45	0
Career total			343	0	29	0	7	0	4	0	383	0
