= Dženan Pejčinović =

German footballer (born 2005)

Personal information
- Date of birth: 15 February 2005 (age 21)
- Place of birth: Munich, Germany
- Height: 1.88 m (6 ft 2 in)
- Position: Forward

Team information
- Current team: VfB Stuttgart
- Number: 17

Youth career
- Bayern Munich
- 2017–2022: FC Augsburg
- 2022–2025: VfL Wolfsburg

Senior career*
Years	Team	Apps	(Gls)
2022–2026	VfL Wolfsburg	35	(8)
2024–2025	→ Fortuna Düsseldorf (loan)	19	(5)
2026–	VfB Stuttgart	8	(0)

International career^{‡}
2019	Montenegro U15	6	(1)
2020	Germany U16	2	(2)
2021–2022	Germany U17	17	(17)
2022–2023	Germany U18	9	(10)
2023–2024	Germany U19	9	(9)
2024–2025	Germany U20	4	(1)
2025–	Germany U21	12	(5)
- * Club domestic league appearances and goals as of 31 October 2026 ‡ National team caps and goals as of 20:35, 17 November 2026 (UTC)

Dženan Pejčinović (born 15 February 2005) is a German professional footballer who plays as a forward for Bundesliga club VfB Stuttgart.

== Club career ==
=== Early career ===
Born in Munich to Montenegrin parents from Plav, Pejčinović started his career with German giants Bayern Munich through their youth system, before a move to FC Augsburg in 2017. After stellar performances in the FC Augsburg academy, he was recruited by and linked with moves to teams across Europe, including Italian sides Inter Milan, AC Milan and Juventus, English sides Chelsea and Manchester City, along with Dutch side Ajax.

=== VfL Wolfsburg ===
Despite this interest, Pejčinović decided to stay in Germany, signing with Bundesliga club VfL Wolfsburg in July 2022.

==== Loan to Fortuna Düsseldorf ====
In July 2024, Pejčinović joined 2. Bundesliga club Fortuna Düsseldorf on a one-year loan deal for the 2024–25 season.

=== VfB Stuttgart ===
On 10 August 2026, he moved to fellow Bundesliga club VfB Stuttgart, on a permanent transfer and signing a contract until 2031, leaving VfL Wolfsburg after its relegation to the second tier. On 21 August, he made his debut in the first round of the DFB-Pokal, scoring a hattrick in a 4–0 win over Hansa Rostock.

== International career ==
He is eligible to represent Germany, Montenegro and Bosnia and Herzegovina (as his paternal grandparents are from the latter). Having represented Montenegro at under-15 level, Pejčinović switched allegiances to Germany in 2020, and has represented them from under-16 to under-21 levels.

== Style of play ==
A tall and powerful forward, he has earned comparisons to Bosnian striker Edin Džeko, and was given the nickname "Džeko" by his teammates at Wolfsburg. Pejčinović himself says his strengths are heading the ball and his finishing ability. He is a fan of English forward Harry Kane.

== Career statistics ==
As of match played 3 November 2026

Appearances and goals by club, season and competition
Club	Season	League			DFB-Pokal		Europe		Other		Total	
Club	Season	Division	Apps	Goals	Apps	Goals	Apps	Goals	Apps	Goals	Apps	Goals
VfL Wolfsburg	2022–23	Bundesliga	1	0	0	0	—		—		1	0
VfL Wolfsburg	2023–24	Bundesliga	4	0	0	0	—		—		4	0
VfL Wolfsburg	2025–26	Bundesliga	30	8	2	3	—		2 (Note: Appearances in Bundesliga relegation play-offs)	1	34	13
VfL Wolfsburg	Total		35	8	2	3	—		2	1	39	13
Fortuna Düsseldorf (loan)	2024–25	2. Bundesliga	19	5	1	0	—		—		20	5
VfB Stuttgart	2026–27	Bundesliga	8	0	2	3	4 (Note: Appearances in UEFA Champions League)	0	—		14	3
Career total			62	13	5	6	4	0	2	1	73	21
