= Patrick Wimmer =

Austrian footballer (born 2001)

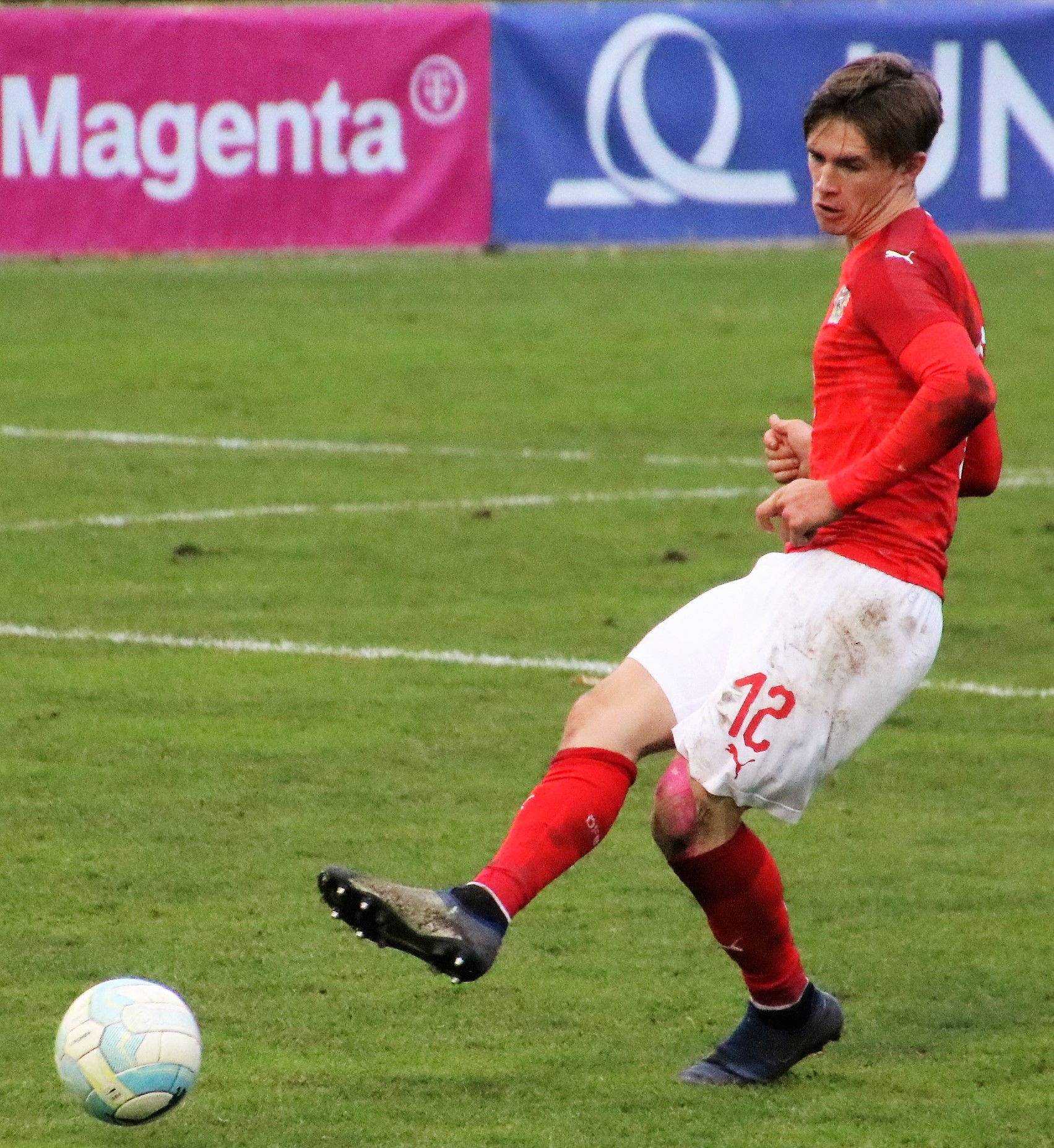
- Wimmer playing for Austria U19 in 2019

Personal information
- Date of birth: 30 May 2001 (age 25)
- Place of birth: Tulln, Austria
- Height: 1.82 m (6 ft 0 in)
- Position: Right winger

Team information
- Current team: TSG Hoffenheim
- Number: 8

Senior career*
Years	Team	Apps	(Gls)
2017–2019	SV Gaflenz	43	(9)
2019	Austria Wien II	15	(2)
2019–2021	Austria Wien	47	(5)
2021–2022	Arminia Bielefeld	31	(3)
2022–2026	VfL Wolfsburg	94	(13)
2026–	TSG Hoffenheim	4	(0)

International career^{‡}
2019–2020	Austria U19	9	(3)
2020–2022	Austria U21	10	(2)
2022–	Austria	36	(1)
- * Club domestic league appearances and goals as of 22:30, 20 September 2026 (UTC) ‡ National team caps and goals as of 18:55, 4 October 2026 (UTC)

Patrick Wimmer (born 30 May 2001) is an Austrian professional footballer who plays as a right winger for German Bundesliga club TSG Hoffenheim and the Austria national team.

== Club career ==
On 13 April 2022, Wimmer signed a five-year contract with VfL Wolfsburg, beginning with the 2022–23 season.

On 3 June 2026, Wimmer moved to TSG Hoffenheim, remaining in Bundesliga after Wolfsburg's relegation.

== International career ==
Wimmer was called up to the senior Austria squad for the UEFA Nations League matches against Croatia, Denmark, France and Denmark on 3, 6, 10 and 13 June 2022.

On 18 May 2026, Wimmer was selected in Ralf Rangnick’s 26-man squad for the 2026 FIFA World Cup, marking Austria’s first appearance in the tournament since 1998.

== Career statistics ==
=== Club ===
As of match played 20 September 2026

Appearances and goals by club, season and competition
Club	Season	League			National cup		Europe		Other		Total	
Club	Season	Division	Apps	Goals	Apps	Goals	Apps	Goals	Apps	Goals	Apps	Goals
Austria Wien II	2019–20	Austrian 2. Liga	15	2	0	0	—		—		15	2
Austria Wien	2019–20	Austrian Bundesliga	16	0	0	0	—		3 (Note: Appearances in Austrian Bundesliga European play-offs)	2	19	2
Austria Wien	2020–21	Austrian Bundesliga	31	5	4	0	—		3	1	38	6
Austria Wien	Total		47	5	4	0	—		6	3	57	8
Arminia Bielefeld	2021–22	Bundesliga	31	3	1	0	—		—		32	3
VfL Wolfsburg	2022–23	Bundesliga	26	4	3	0	—		—		29	4
VfL Wolfsburg	2023–24	Bundesliga	14	2	1	0	—		—		15	2
VfL Wolfsburg	2024–25	Bundesliga	29	3	4	1	—		—		33	4
VfL Wolfsburg	2025–26	Bundesliga	25	4	2	0	—		0	0	27	4
VfL Wolfsburg	Total		94	13	10	1	—		0	0	104	14
TSG Hoffenheim	2026–27	Bundesliga	4	0	1	2	1 (Note: Appearance in UEFA Europa League)	0	—		6	2
Career total			191	23	16	3	1	0	6	3	214	29

=== International ===
As of match played 4 October 2026

Appearances and goals by national team and year
National team	Year	Apps	Goals
Austria	2022	1	0
Austria	2023	7	0
Austria	2024	13	1
Austria	2025	7	0
Austria	2026	8	0
Total		36	1

Scores and results list Austria's goal tally first, score column indicates score after each Wimmer goal.

List of international goals scored by Patrick Wimmer
No.	Date	Venue	Opponent	Score	Result	Competition
1.	4 June 2024	Ernst-Happel-Stadion, Vienna, Austria	Serbia	1–0	2–1	Friendly

== Honours ==
Individual

- Bundesliga Rookie of the Month: January 2022
