= Kevin Paredes =

American soccer player (born 2003)

Personal information
- Full name: Kevin Alexander Paredes
- Date of birth: May 7, 2003 (age 23)
- Place of birth: South Riding, Virginia, U.S.
- Height: 5 ft 9 in (1.75 m)
- Positions: Left wing-back; left winger

Team information
- Current team: Utrecht
- Number: 30

Youth career
- 2016–2018: Bethesda SC
- 2019–2020: D.C. United

Senior career*
Years	Team	Apps	(Gls)
2019	Loudoun United	4	(0)
2020–2021	D.C. United	41	(3)
2022–2026	VfL Wolfsburg	60	(4)
2026–	Utrecht	3	(0)

International career^{‡}
2019	United States U16	6	(2)
2022–2023	United States U20	8	(2)
2024	United States U23	6	(2)
2023–	United States	3	(0)
- * Club domestic league appearances and goals as of August 22, 2026 ‡ National team caps and goals as of August 2, 2024

Kevin Alexander Paredes (/pəˈrɛdɪs/ pə-RED-iss; born May 7, 2003) is an American professional soccer player who plays as a left wing-back or left winger for Eredivisie club Utrecht and the United States national team.

== Club career ==
=== Loudoun United ===
Paredes played his first professional match with Loudoun United FC on September 25, 2019, subbing in the 68th minute of the team's 4–1 win over the Swope Park Rangers.

=== D.C. United ===
On January 17, 2020, Paredes signed with Loudoun's parent club D.C. United and became the club's 14th Homegrown Player signing. Paredes got his first playing time with D.C. United later that year, during a July 18 match against the New England Revolution in the MLS is Back Tournament, where he entered the game in the 88th minute as a substitute. He contributed his first MLS assist on October 24, serving Gelmin Rivas's stoppage time winner in a 2–1 win over Atlanta United.

Paredes scored his first MLS goal on July 3, 2021, in a record-breaking 7–1 win against Toronto FC at home.

=== Wolfsburg ===
On January 28, 2022, Paredes signed with German club VfL Wolfsburg of the Bundesliga, becoming the fourth homegrown player from D.C. United to transfer to Europe. The transfer fee was reported to be around $7.35 million.

On April 9, Paredes made his debut for Wolfsburg against Arminia Bielefeld. He scored his first Bundesliga goal for Wolfsburg on January 28, 2023, as a substitute in a 2–1 loss to Werder Bremen.

In August 2024, Paredes suffered a broken foot during preseason training causing him to miss much of the season and only making two appearances during the year. He underwent surgery on his foot during the summer of 2025, after reaggravating the injury, causing him to miss the first couple months of the 2025–26 season.

=== FC Utrecht ===
On June 24, 2026, Paredes signed a contract with Utrecht in the Netherlands for one season, with an option to extend for two more seasons.

== International career ==
In August 2023, Paredes received his first call-up to the United States senior national team by head coach Gregg Berhalter, for two friendly matches against Uzbekistan and Oman.

After having made his Olympic debut in games against France and New Zealand, on July 30, 2024, Paredes scored two goals against Guinea, in a game which sent the US U-23's to the knockout round of the Paris Olympics.

== Personal life ==
Born in the United States, Paredes is of Dominican descent.

== Career statistics ==
=== Club ===
As of match played August 22, 2026

Appearances and goals by club, season and competition
Club	Season	League			National cup (Note: Includes DFB-Pokal)		Other		Total	
Club	Season	Division	Apps	Goals	Apps	Goals	Apps	Goals	Apps	Goals
Loudoun United	2019	USL	3	0	–		–		3	0
Loudoun United	2020	USL	1	0	–		–		1	0
Loudoun United	Total		4	0	–		–		4	0
D.C. United	2020	MLS	17 (Note: Includes three appearances in MLS is Back Tournament group stage)	0	–		–		17	0
D.C. United	2021	MLS	24	3	–		–		24	3
D.C. United	Total		41	3	–		–		41	3
VfL Wolfsburg	2021–22	Bundesliga	2	0	–		–		2	0
VfL Wolfsburg	2022–23	Bundesliga	22	1	2	0	–		24	1
VfL Wolfsburg	2023–24	Bundesliga	28	3	1	0	–		29	3
VfL Wolfsburg	2024–25	Bundesliga	2	0	–		–		2	0
VfL Wolfsburg	2025–26	Bundesliga	6	0	0	0	2 (Note: Appearances in Bundesliga relegation play-offs)	0	8	0
VfL Wolfsburg	Total		60	4	3	0	2	0	65	4
Utrecht	2026–27	Eredivisie	3	0	0	0	—		3	0
Career total			108	7	3	0	2	0	112	7

=== International ===
As of match played November 16, 2023

Appearances and goals by national team and year
National team	Year	Apps	Goals
United States	2023	3	0
Total		3	0

== Honors ==
Individual

- U.S. Soccer Young Male Player of the Year: 2023
