= Bartol Franjić =

Croatian footballer (born 2000)

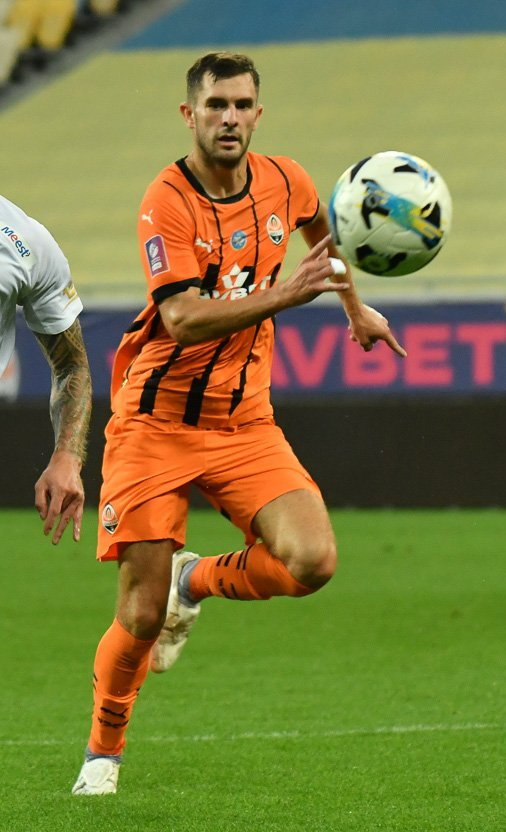
- Franjić with Shakhtar Donetsk in 2024

Personal information
- Date of birth: 14 January 2000 (age 26)
- Place of birth: Zagreb, Croatia
- Height: 1.80 m (5 ft 11 in)
- Positions: Defensive midfielder; defender

Team information
- Current team: Venezia
- Number: 4

Youth career
- 2008–2018: Dinamo Zagreb

Senior career*
Years	Team	Apps	(Gls)
2018–2021	Dinamo Zagreb II	35	(4)
2020–2022	Dinamo Zagreb	51	(0)
2022–2026	VfL Wolfsburg	5	(0)
2023–2024	→ Darmstadt 98 (loan)	20	(0)
2024–2025	→ Shakhtar Donetsk (loan)	5	(1)
2025	→ Dinamo Zagreb (loan)	15	(0)
2025–2026	→ Venezia (loan)	19	(0)
2026–	Venezia	0	(0)

International career^{‡}
2014	Croatia U14	4	(0)
2015	Croatia U15	5	(0)
2015–2016	Croatia U16	6	(0)
2016–2017	Croatia U17	10	(2)
2017–2018	Croatia U18	3	(0)
2018	Croatia U19	7	(0)
2019	Croatia U20	1	(0)
2020–2023	Croatia U21	15	(1)
- * Club domestic league appearances and goals as of 12 May 2026 ‡ National team caps and goals as of 4 August 2024

Bartol Franjić (Croatian pronunciation: [bâːrtol frǎːɲitɕ]; born 14 January 2000) is a Croatian professional footballer who plays as a defensive midfielder or a defender for Serie A club Venezia.

== Club career ==
Born in Zagreb and raised in Dugo Selo, Franjić joined the academy of Croatian giants Dinamo Zagreb in 2008, frequently serving as a captain at various youth levels. On 1 April 2016, he signed a contract with the club until 2022. In January 2019, Franjić joined the senior team during the winter break training camp in Belek during Nenad Bjelica's tenure at the club. He played and scored in a friendly 2–0 victory over Śląsk Wrocław, impressing his older teammates. In 2019–20 UEFA Youth League, Franjić played a key part as Dinamo progressed to the knockout phase from the group with Atalanta, Manchester City and Shakhtar Donetsk.

On 17 June 2020, Franjić debuted for senior Dinamo team in a 3–2 victory over Slaven Belupo, during the tenure of Igor Jovićević, his former coach from the youth ranks. However, Jovićević was soon sacked and succeeded by Zoran Mamić. On 22 October, Franjić made his Europa League debut in a goalless draw with Feyenoord, coming on for Kristijan Jakić in the 71st minute. A week later, he was unexpectedly named in the starting lineup in the Europa League fixture against CSKA Moscow away. The game ended in another goalless draw, and Franjić was praised for his defensive performance against CSKA Moscow's Nikola Vlašić. On 15 December 2020, Franjić renewed his contract with Dinamo until 2025.

On 18 March 2021, new coach Damir Krznar named Franjić in the starting lineup for the second leg of Dinamo's Europa League Round of 16 tie against Tottenham Hotspur. He played out of position–as a centre-back while defending and a left-back while attacking–earning praise for his performance as Dinamo won 3–2 on aggregate. At the beginning of the 2021–22 season, on 10 August, Franjić scored his first goal for Dinamo in a Champions League qualifier against Legia Warsaw, which turned out to be crucial as Dinamo won 2–1 on aggregate. He once again played out of position, as Krznar deployed him as a left-back once again. On 27 June 2022, Franjić signed a five-year contract with VfL Wolfsburg in Germany. On 18 August 2023, Franjić moved on a season-long loan to Darmstadt 98. On 9 July 2024, Franjić was loaned to Shakhtar Donetsk in Ukraine. On 4 January 2025, he returned on loan to Dinamo Zagreb.

On 10 July 2025, Franjić joined Venezia in Italy on loan with a conditional obligation to buy.

== International career ==
Franjić was part of Dario Bašić's 18-man squad for UEFA Under-17 Euro 2017.

Franjić made his under-21 debut in a Euro 2021 qualifier against Scotland on 12 November 2020. On 9 March 2021, he was named in Igor Bišćan's final 23-man squad for the group stage of the tournament. On 17 May, he was named in Bišćan's 23-man squad for the knockout stage of the tournament.

== Career statistics ==
As of match played 25 May 2025

Appearances and goals by club, season and competition
Club	Season	League			National cup (Note: Includes Croatian Cup, DFB-Pokal)		Continental		Total	
Club	Season	Division	Apps	Goals	Apps	Goals	Apps	Goals	Apps	Goals
Dinamo Zagreb II	2018–19	Druga HNL	13	0	—		—		13	0
Dinamo Zagreb II	2019–20	Druga HNL	15	2	—		—		15	2
Dinamo Zagreb II	2020–21	Druga HNL	7	2	—		—		7	2
Dinamo Zagreb II	Total		35	4	—		—		35	4
Dinamo Zagreb	2019–20	Prva HNL	4	0	0	0	0	0	4	0
Dinamo Zagreb	2020–21	Prva HNL	22	0	5	0	11 (Note: Appearances in UEFA Europa League)	0	38	0
Dinamo Zagreb	2021–22	Prva HNL	25	0	2	0	13 (Note: Six appearances and one goal in UEFA Champions League, seven appearances in UEFA Europa League)	1	40	1
Dinamo Zagreb	Total		51	0	7	0	24	1	82	1
VfL Wolfsburg	2022–23	Bundesliga	5	0	1	0	—		6	0
VfL Wolfsburg	2023–24	Bundesliga	0	0	0	0	—		0	0
VfL Wolfsburg	Total		5	0	1	0	—		6	0
Darmstadt 98 (loan)	2023–24	Bundesliga	20	0	—		—		20	0
Shakhtar Donetsk (loan)	2024–25	Ukrainian Premier League	5	1	1	0	2 (Note: Appearances in UEFA Champions League)	0	8	1
Dinamo Zagreb (loan)	2024–25	Croatian Football League	14	0	1	0	0	0	15	0
Career total			130	5	10	0	26	1	166	6

== Honours ==
Dinamo Zagreb

- Prva HNL: 2020–21, 2021–22
- Croatian Cup: 2020–21
