= Lukáš Ambros =

Czech footballer (born 2004)

- Ambros with Anderlecht in 2026

Personal information
- Date of birth: 5 June 2004 (age 22)
- Place of birth: Dolní Němčí, Czech Republic
- Height: 1.82 m (6 ft 0 in)
- Position: Midfielder

Team information
- Current team: Anderlecht
- Number: 18

Youth career
- 2011–2015: Dolní Němčí
- 2015–2017: Slovácko
- 2017–2020: Slavia Prague
- 2020–2023: VfL Wolfsburg

Senior career*
| Years | Team | Apps | (Gls) |
| 2023–2024 | VfL Wolfsburg | 1 | (0) |
| 2023–2024 | → SC Freiburg II (loan) | 29 | (1) |
| 2024–2026 | Górnik Zabrze | 54 | (2) |
| 2026– | Anderlecht | 7 | (0) |

International career^{‡}
| 2018–2019 | Czech Republic U15 | 10 | (1) |
| 2019–2020 | Czech Republic U16 | 5 | (2) |
| 2021–2022 | Czech Republic U18 | 11 | (1) |
| 2022–2023 | Czech Republic U19 | 10 | (2) |
| 2023–2025 | Czech Republic U20 | 9 | (0) |
| 2023– | Czech Republic U21 | 9 | (1) |
| 2026– | Czech Republic | 6 | (0) |
- * Club domestic league appearances and goals as of 19:02, 10 October 2026 (UTC) ‡ National team caps and goals as of 23:59, 15 November 2026 (UTC)

Lukáš Ambros (born 5 June 2004) is a Czech professional footballer who plays as a midfielder for Belgian Pro League club Anderlecht and the Czech Republic national team.

== Club career ==
Ambros is a youth product of the Czech clubs Dolní Němčí, Slovácko, and Slavia Prague before moving to the youth academy of the German club VfL Wolfsburg in the summer of 2020. He worked his way up their youth categories, eventually captaining their U18 side and signed his first professional contract with the club on 4 September 2021. He was promoted to their senior side in the winter of 2022. He made his professional debut with Wolfsburg as a late substitute in a 3–0 Bundesliga loss to RB Leipzig on 18 February 2023, becoming the youngest ever Czech player in the league.

On 1 September 2023, Ambros moved on loan to SC Freiburg II.

On 29 June 2024, Ambros joined Polish side Górnik Zabrze on a three-year deal.

On 10 July 2026, Ambros signed a contract with Belgian Pro League club Anderlecht until 2030 with option for another year.

== International career ==
Ambros is a former youth international for the Czech Republic, having captained the Czech Republic U18s.

On 26 September 2026, Ambros made his debut for the Czech Republic national team in a 2026–27 UEFA Nations League A game against Croatia.

== Career statistics ==
=== Club ===
As of match played 22 October 2026

Appearances and goals by club, season and competition
| Club | Season | League | | | National cup (Note: Includes Polish Cup) | | Europe | | Other | | Total | |
| Club | Season | Division | Apps | Goals | Apps | Goals | Apps | Goals | Apps | Goals | Apps | Goals |
|---|---|---|---|---|---|---|---|---|---|---|---|---|
| VfL Wolfsburg | 2022–23 | Bundesliga | 1 | 0 | 0 | 0 | — | | — | | 1 | 0 |
| SC Freiburg II (loan) | 2023–24 | 3. Liga | 29 | 1 | — | | — | | — | | 29 | 1 |
| Górnik Zabrze | 2024–25 | Ekstraklasa | 28 | 1 | 1 | 0 | — | | — | | 29 | 1 |
| Górnik Zabrze | 2025–26 | Ekstraklasa | 26 | 1 | 3 | 1 | — | | — | | 29 | 2 |
| Górnik Zabrze | Total | | 54 | 2 | 4 | 1 | — | | — | | 58 | 3 |
| Anderlecht | 2026–27 | Belgian Pro League | 7 | 0 | 0 | 0 | 9 (Note: Appearances in UEFA Europa League) | 2 | — | | 16 | 2 |
| Career total | | | 91 | 3 | 4 | 1 | 9 | 2 | 0 | 0 | 104 | 6 |

=== International ===
As of match played 15 November 2026

Appearances and goals by national team and year
| National team | Year | Apps | Goals |
|---|---|---|---|
Czech Republic
| Czech Republic | 2026 | 6 | 0 |
| Total | | 6 | 0 |

== Honours ==
Górnik Zabrze

- Polish Cup: 2025–26
