= Lino Kasten =

German footballer

Personal information
- Date of birth: 17 January 2001 (age 25)
- Place of birth: Berlin, Germany
- Height: 1.88 m (6 ft 2 in)
- Position: Goalkeeper

Team information
- Current team: SpVgg Bayreuth
- Number: 45

Youth career
- 2005–2015: Viktoria 1889 Berlin
- 2015–2021: VfL Wolfsburg

Senior career*
Years	Team	Apps	(Gls)
2019–2020	VfL Wolfsburg II	11	(0)
2021–2022	VfL Wolfsburg	0	(0)
2021–2022	→ St. Pölten (loan)	23	(0)
2023–2025	VSG Altglienicke	30	(0)
2025	G2 Football Club	9	(0)
2025–	SpVgg Bayreuth	16	(0)

International career
2016	Germany U15	1	(0)
2016–2017	Germany U16	3	(0)
2017–2018	Germany U17	4	(0)
2019	Germany U18	1	(0)
- * Club domestic league appearances and goals as of 27 September 2026

Lino Kasten (born 17 January 2001) is a German professional footballer who plays as a goalkeeper for SpVgg Bayreuth].

== Club career ==
On 1 September 2022, Kasten was released by VfL Wolfsburg. Kasten would be signed by Regionalliga Nordost club VSG Altglienicke in 2023, where he would make 30 appearances before terminating his contract at his request on 8 April 2025. Kasten would then sign for G2 Football Club, the football division of German esports club G2 Esports, for the seven-a-side football league Kings League Germany.

== International career ==
Kasten has represented Germany at youth international level.

== Career statistics ==
=== Club ===
As of 27 September 2026.

Appearances and goals by club, season and competition
Club	Season	League			Cup		Continental		Other		Total	
Club	Season	Division	Apps	Goals	Apps	Goals	Apps	Goals	Apps	Goals	Apps	Goals
VfL Wolfsburg II	2019–20	Regionalliga Nord	9	0	–		–		0	0	9	0
VfL Wolfsburg II	2020–21	Regionalliga Nord	2	0	–		–		0	0	2	0
VfL Wolfsburg II	Total		11	0	0	0	0	0	0	0	11	0
VfL Wolfsburg	2021–22	Bundesliga	0	0	0	0	–		0	0	0	0
St. Pölten (loan)	2021–22	Austrian 2. Liga	23	0	2 (Note: Appearances in the Austrian Cup)	0	–		0	0	25	0
VSG Altglienicke	2022–23	Regionalliga Nordost	1	0	–		–		0	0	1	0
VSG Altglienicke	2023–24	Regionalliga Nordost	23	0	–		–		0	0	23	0
VSG Altglienicke	2024–25	Regionalliga Nordost	6	0	–		–		0	0	6	0
VSG Altglienicke	Total		30	0	0	0	0	0	0	0	30	0
G2 Football Club	2025 Winter	Kings League Germany	9	0	–		–		0 (Note: Appearances in the Kings World Cup Clubs)	0	9	0
SpVgg Bayreuth	2025–26	Regionalliga Bayern	10	0	–		–		0	0	10	0
SpVgg Bayreuth	2026–27	Regionalliga Bayern	6	0	–		–		0	0	6	0
SpVgg Bayreuth	Total		16	0	0	0	0	0	0	0	16	0
Career total			89	0	2	0	0	0	0	0	91	0
