= Fabio Di Michele Sánchez =

German footballer (born 2003)

Personal information
- Full name: Fabio Di Michele Sánchez
- Date of birth: 14 March 2003 (age 23)
- Place of birth: Hannover, Germany
- Height: 1.80 m (5 ft 11 in)
- Position: Left-back

Team information
- Current team: Eintracht Braunschweig
- Number: 22

Youth career
- 2018–2021: VfL Wolfsburg

Senior career*
Years	Team	Apps	(Gls)
2021–2023	VfL Wolfsburg	0	(0)
2022–2023	→ NAC Breda (loan)	13	(0)
2023–2024	1. FC Saarbrücken	33	(0)
2024–	Eintracht Braunschweig	57	(1)
- * Club domestic league appearances and goals as of 18 May 2026

Fabio Di Michele Sánchez (born 14 March 2003) is a German professional footballer who plays as a left-back for 2. Bundesliga club Eintracht Braunschweig.

== Career ==
Di Michele Sánchez joined NAC Breda on loan from Wolfsburg in July 2022. He made his debut in the Eerste Divisie on 5 August 2022, in a 1–0 win against Helmond Sport at the Rat Verlegh Stadion. In November 2022 he suffered a serious injury and returned to Germany for rehabilitation.

On 28 June 2023, Di Michele Sánchez signed for 3. Liga club 1. FC Saarbrücken.

On 14 June 2024, Di Michele Sánchez joined Eintracht Braunschweig in 2. Bundesliga on a two-year deal.

== Personal life ==
Born in Germany, Di Michele Sánchez is of Italian and Spanish descent.
