= 2025–26 VfL Wolfsburg season =

VfL Wolfsburg
2025–26 season
- Managing directors: Peter Christiansen; Michael Meeske; Tim Schumacher
- Head coach: Paul Simonis (until 9 November); Daniel Bauer (9 November – 8 March); Dieter Hecking (from 8 March)
- Stadium: Volkswagen Arena
- Bundesliga: 16th (relegated via play-off)
- DFB-Pokal: Second round
- Top goalscorer: League: Mohamed Amoura, Dženan Pejčinović (8); All: Dženan Pejčinović (12)
- Average home league attendance: 24,716
Home colours	Away colours	Third colours

The 2025–26 season was the 81st season in VfL Wolfsburg's history and the club's 29th consecutive season in the Bundesliga. The club also competed in the DFB-Pokal.

Wolfsburg started the season under new manager Paul Simonis, but he was dismissed after just ten Bundesliga matches, with the club 14th in the league. He was replaced by Daniel Bauer, first on an interim basis, before Bauer was given the job permanently on 20 December after picking up seven points from four Bundesliga matches. The club only picked up five points from the following eleven matches however, and Bauer was sacked on 8 March, with Wolfsburg 17th in the Bundesliga, with experienced manager Dieter Hecking appointed as his replacement. Under Hecking, Wolfsburg won nine points from 9 Bundesliga matches, allowing them to avoid automatic relegation, securing a 16th-place relegation play-off finish on the final day of the season. After a 0–0 draw at home to SC Paderborn in the first leg of the play-off, Wolfsburg lost 2–1 after extra time in the second leg and were relegated to the 2. Bundesliga.

Wolfsburg reached the second round of the DFB-Pokal (having beaten SV Hemelingen 9–0 in the first round), where they lost 1–0 at home to 2. Bundesliga club Holstein Kiel.

== Background and pre-season ==
Following the end of the 2023–24 season, manager Niko Kovač was dismissed and replaced by Ralph Hasenhüttl. Under Hasenhüttl, the club performed better than in the previous season, matching the previous season's final points tally of 37 in early March, after 24 matches, with the club 7th in the table. However, after Wolfsburg failed to win any of the following eight matches, Hasenhüttl was sacked and Daniel Bauer took over as interim manager for the final two matches. Wolfsburg finished the 2024–25 season 11th with 43 points.

On 12 June 2025, Dutchman Paul Simonis was appointed as head coach on a two-year contract, having won the KNVB Cup with Go Ahead Eagles in the previous season, his only season as a manager. VfL Wolfsburg were forecasted to finish 10th in the league by Opta, and had the highest net spend of any Bundesliga club over the course of the 2025–26 season, estimated at €30 million.

Following the end of the 2024–25 season, goalkeeper Niklas Klinger, midfielder Bennit Bröger and forwards Bartosz Białek and Kevin Behrens were all released, and forward Lukas Nmecha signed for Premier League club Leeds United after his Wolfsburg contract expired. Young goalkeeper Philipp Schulze and young midfielder Kofi Amoako left for undisclosed fees to SC Verl and Dynamo Dresden respectively, whilst first team defenders Cédric Zesiger and Sebastiaan Bornauw also left the club; Zesiger transferred to FC Augsburg for an undisclosed fee, having spent the second half of the previous season on loan at the club, whilst Bornauw joined Leeds United for a fee of €6,000,000. Forward Tiago Tomás was sold to fellow Bundesliga club VfB Stuttgart for a fee of €14,000,000.

Forward Mohamed Amoura signed for Wolfsburg on a permanent basis for a fee of around €17,000,000, having agreed a loan with a compulsory purchase option from Union Saint-Gilloise the previous summer. Young goalkeeper Jakub Zielinski signed from Legia Warsaw for an undisclosed fee, as did defender Denis Vavro who transferred from F.C. Copenhagen. Fellow defender Aaron Zehnter signed from SC Paderborn for a fee of €4,500,000, whilst midfielder Vinícius Souza joined from EFL Championship club Sheffield United for an undisclosed fee.

Wolfsburg signed Danish winger Jesper Lindstrøm on a season-long loan from Napoli, whilst Jakub Kamiński and Bartol Franjić left the club on season-long loans, to 1. FC Köln and Venezia respectively. Nicolas Cozza also left on a season-long loan to Nantes where he was on loan during the previous season.

== Review ==
=== Paul Simonis' tenure (August to November) ===
Wolfsburg's season began with a DFB-Pokal first round match away to fifth-tier club SV Hemelingen on 16 August, which they won 9–0, the largest DFB-Pokal victory in the club's history. Dženan Pejčinović, who had spent the previous season out on loan with Fortuna Düsseldorf, scored a hat-trick for Wolfsburg, whilst Mattias Svanberg scored a brace and four others (Moritz Jenz, Andreas Skov Olsen, Lovro Majer and Václav Černý) scored once. Wolfsburg also won their opening Bundesliga match a week later, beating 1. FC Heidenheim 3–1 away after goals from Skov Olsen, Svanberg and Mohamed Amoura, who had scored a penalty. Midfielder Aster Vranckx had left the club on a season-long loan to Sassuolo on 22 August, and defender Saël Kumbedi came in on a season-long loan from Olympique Lyonnais on 28 August. Wolfsburg drew at home in both of their following two Bundesliga matches, firstly a 1–1 against Mainz 05, and then a 3–3 against 1. FC Köln. In the former, Aaron Zehnter had put Wolfsburg 1–0 ahead in the 9th minute before Mainz equalised in the 89th, and in the latter, goals from Amoura and Majer put Wolfsburg 2–1 up after going behind early on before two Köln goals either side of a Wolfsburg goal from Maximilian Arnold in second half stoppage time saw the game end 3–3. Prior to the end of the transfer window on 2 September, Wolfsburg had sold David Odogu to AC Milan for a fee of €7,000,000 and Václav Černý to Beşiktaş for an undisclosed fee, and whilst Jenson Seelt and Adam Daghim joined on season-long loans from Sunderland and Red Bull Salzburg respectively. The club's fourth and fifth league matches of the season had both ended in 1–0 defeats, away to Borussia Dortmund and at home to RB Leipzig respectively.

Across October, Wolfsburg recorded one win and two defeats from their three Bundesliga matches. Adam Daghim scored in a 3–1 away defeat to FC Augsburg on 4 October, before Wolfsburg lost 3–0 at home to VfB Stuttgart on 18 October. Wolfsburg then won 1–0 away at Hamburger SV, with Daghim scoring the only goal of the game. Wolfsburg were also eliminated from the DFB-Pokal during October, losing 1–0 to Holstein Kiel in the second round on 28 October.

On 9 November 2025, manager Paul Simonis was sacked, having won just twice in the opening 10 matches of the Bundesliga season. The Guardian journalist Andy Brassell claimed after his dismissal that Simonis "always seemed an awkward fit coming off just a year as a senior head coach" and that he struggled to impose himself on the club, whilst Simonis told local newspaper Wolfsberger Allgemeine Zeitung that he would have liked more time in the role and that he felt that performances were improving.

=== Daniel Bauer's tenure (November to March) ===
Under-19 manager Daniel Bauer was appointed as his replacement on an interim basis, and on 20 December, he was given the job on a permanent basis.

On 8 March 2026, manager Bauer was sacked, alongside sports managing director Peter Christiansen, and Dieter Hecking was appointed as the club's new manager.

=== Dieter Hecking's tenure (March to May) ===
Going into the final game of the season Wolfsburg occupied the relegation play-off place, but were level on 26 points with the bottom two sides 1. FC Heidenheim and FC St. Pauli. Wolfsburg needed to avoid defeat away to FC St. Pauli to avoid direct relegation, and also needed to at least match Heidenheim's result against Mainz 05. Konstantinos Koulierakis put Wolfsburg 1–0 ahead at half time after scoring a header from a corner, before Abdoulie Ceesay equalised for the home side in the 57th minute, also with a header from a corner. A Nikola Vasilj own goal from a corner seven minutes after put Wolfsburg back ahead, and though Christian Eriksen missed a penalty to put Wolfsburg 3–1 up in the 77th minute, Dženan Pejčinović scored a third Wolfsburg goal after a direct attack three minutes after to give Wolfsburg a 3–1 victory. With Heidenheim having lost 2–0 to Mainz, this result qualified Wolfsburg for the relegation play-off match, whilst Heidenheim and St. Pauli were relegated directly.

Wolfsburg played SC Paderborn, who had finished 3rd in the 2. Bundesliga, in the relegation play-off. In the first leg, Wolfsburg were held to a 0–0 at home, despite having the better chances and more possession of the ball. Pejčinović put Wolfsburg ahead three minutes into the second leg, but Mæhle was sent off for Wolfsburg in the 15th minute, after receiving two yellow cards. Filip Bilbija scored a headed equaliser in the 39th minute, and after the game went to extra time, Laurin Curda scored a winner for Paderborn, to relegate Wolfsburg to the 2. Bundesliga. Manager Hecking stepped down from this role after the relegation and became the clubs managing director for sport.

== Competitions ==
=== Bundesliga ===
==== League table ====
Pos	Team	Pld	W	D	L	GF	GA	GD	Pts	Qualification or relegation
14	1. FC Köln	34	7	11	16	49	63	−14	32	
15	Werder Bremen	34	8	8	18	37	60	−23	32	
16	VfL Wolfsburg (R)	34	7	8	19	45	69	−24	29	Qualification for the relegation play-offs
17	1. FC Heidenheim (R)	34	6	8	20	41	72	−31	26	Relegation to 2. Bundesliga
18	FC St. Pauli (R)	34	6	8	20	29	60	−31	26	Relegation to 2. Bundesliga

Source: Bundesliga
Rules for classification: 1) Points; 2) Goal difference; 3) Goals scored; 4) Head-to-head results; 5) Head-to-head away goals scored; 6) Away goals scored; 7) Play-off.
(Rules 4–6 only apply after home and away matches have been played between the tied teams.)
(R) Relegated

==== Match details ====
Bundesliga match details
Round	Date	Time	Opponent	Venue	Result F–A	Scorers	Attendance	League position	Ref.
1	23 August 2025	15:30	1. FC Heidenheim	Away	3–1	Skov Olsen 20', Svanberg 66', Amoura 87' pen.	15,000	3rd	
2	31 August 2025	15:30	Mainz 05	Home	1–1	Zehnter 9'	21,893	6th	
3	13 September 2025	15:30	1. FC Köln	Home	3–3	Amoura 42', Majer 65', Arnold 90+9'	28,917	8th	
4	21 September 2025	19:30	Borussia Dortmund	Away	0–1		81,365	12th	
5	27 September 2025	15:30	RB Leipzig	Home	0–1		23,236	12th	
6	4 October 2025	15:30	FC Augsburg	Away	1–3	Daghim 65'	28,200	15th	
7	18 October 2025	15:30	VfB Stuttgart	Home	0–3		26,145	15th	
8	25 October 2025	15:30	Hamburger SV	Away	1–0	Daghim 15'	57,000	12th	
9	2 November 2025	17:30	TSG Hoffenheim	Home	2–3	Amoura 14', 56'	19,078	12th	
10	7 November 2025	20:30	Werder Bremen	Away	1–2	Svanberg 28'	40,500	14th	
11	22 November 2025	15:30	Bayer Leverkusen	Home	1–3	Vavro 57'	25,036	15th	
12	30 November 2025	17:30	Eintracht Frankfurt	Away	1–1	Zehnter 67'	58,000	15th	
13	6 December 2025	15:30	Union Berlin	Home	3–1	Wimmer 10', Amoura 30', Majer 59'	23,045	15th	
14	13 December 2025	15:30	Borussia Mönchengladbach	Away	3–1	Wimmer 4', 34', Amoura 30'	47,161	13th	
15	20 December 2025	15:30	SC Freiburg	Home	3–4	Pejčinović 13', 49', 69'	22,045	14th	
16	11 January 2026	17:30	Bayern Munich	Away	1–8	Pejčinović 13'	75,000	14th	
17	14 January 2026	18:30	FC St. Pauli	Home	2–1	Eriksen 25' pen., Pejčinović 88'	22,031	11th	
18	17 January 2026	15:30	1. FC Heidenheim	Home	1–1	Jenz 80'	19,361	12th	
19	24 January 2026	15:30	Mainz 05	Away	1–3	Amoura 3'	30,000	12th	
20	30 January 2026	20:30	1. FC Köln	Away	0–1		50,000	14th	
21	7 February 2026	15:30	Borussia Dortmund	Home	1–2	Koulierakis 52'	28,917	15th	
22	15 February 2026	17:30	RB Leipzig	Away	2–2	Amoura 52', Svanberg 78'	35,787	15th	
23	21 February 2026	15:30	FC Augsburg	Home	2–3	Gerhardt 41', Shiogai 71'	19,631	15th	
24	1 March 2026	15:30	VfB Stuttgart	Away	0–4		57,500	17th	
25	7 March 2026	15:30	Hamburger SV	Home	1–2	Eriksen 22' pen.	28,917	17th	
26	14 March 2026	15:30	TSG Hoffenheim	Away	1–1	Koulierakis 65'	26,252	17th	
27	21 March 2026	15:30	Werder Bremen	Home	0–1		28,917	17th	
28	4 April 2026	15:30	Bayer Leverkusen	Away	3–6	Wind 16', Maehle 31', Eriksen 38' pen.	29,619	17th	
29	11 April 2026	15:30	Eintracht Frankfurt	Home	1–2	Pejčinović 90+7'	26,132	17th	
30	18 April 2026	15:30	Union Berlin	Away	2–1	Wimmer 11', Pejčinović 46'	22,012	17th	
31	25 April 2026	15:30	Borussia Mönchengladbach	Home	0–0		27,947	17th	
32	3 May 2026	19:30	SC Freiburg	Away	1–1	Koulierakis 55'	32,500	16th	
33	9 May 2026	18:30	Bayern Munich	Home	0–1		28,917	16th	
34	16 May 2026	15:30	FC St. Pauli	Away	3–1	Koulierakis 38', Vasilj 64' o.g., Pejčinović 80'	29,546	16th	

==== Relegation play-off ====
Bundesliga relegation play-off match details
Round	Date	Time	Opponent	Venue	Result F–A	Scorers	Attendance	Ref.
First leg	21 May 2026	20:30	SC Paderborn	Home	0–0		27,800	
Second leg	25 May 2026	20:30	SC Paderborn	Away	1–2 (a.e.t.)	Pejčinović 3'	15,000	

=== DFB-Pokal ===
DFB-Pokal match details
Round	Date	Time	Opponent	Venue	Result F–A	Scorers	Attendance	Ref.
First round	16 August 2025	15:30	SV Hemelingen	Away	9–0	Jenz 13', Skov Olsen 14', Majer 39' pen., Pejčinović 53', 76', 81', Svanberg 61', 71', Černý 72'	6,676	
Second round	28 October 2025	18:30	Holstein Kiel	Home	0–1		10,793	

== Players ==
=== Appearances and goals ===
As of match played 18 October 2025

Numbers in parentheses denote appearances made as a substitute.
Players marked † left the club during the playing season.
Players with names in italics and marked * were on loan from another club for the whole of their season with Wolfsburg.
Key to positions: GK – Goalkeeper; DF – Defender; MF – Midfielder; FW – Forward

Players' appearances and goals by competition
No.	Pos.	Nat.	Name	Bundesliga		DFB-Pokal		Total	
No.	Pos.	Nat.	Name	Apps	Goals	Apps	Goals	Apps	Goals
1	GK	POL	Kamil Grabara	7	0	1	0	8	0
2	DF	GER	Kilian Fischer	7	0	1	0	8	0
3	DF	SVK	Denis Vavro	0	0	1	0	1	0
4	DF	GRE	Konstantinos Koulierakis	7	0	1	0	8	0
5	MF	BRA	Vinicius Souza	7	0	1	0	8	0
7	FW	DEN	Andreas Skov Olsen	4 (2)	1	1	1	5 (2)	2
8	MF	HUN	Bence Dárdai	0	0	0 (1)	0	0 (1)	0
9	FW	ALG	Mohamed Amoura	4 (3)	2	0	0	4 (3)	2
10	MF	CRO	Lovro Majer	4 (3)	1	1	1	5 (3)	2
11	FW	DEN	Adam Daghim *	2 (3)	1	0	0	2 (3)	1
12	GK	AUT	Pavao Pervan	0	0	0	0	0	0
13	DF	BRA	Rogério	0	0	0	0	0	0
14	DF	NED	Jenson Seelt *	0 (1)	0	0	0	0 (1)	0
15	DF	GER	Moritz Jenz	7	0	0 (1)	1	7 (1)	1
17	FW	GER	Dženan Pejčinović	3 (3)	0	1	3	4 (3)	3
18	MF	CZE	Václav Černý †	0 (2)	0	0 (1)	1	0 (3)	1
19	MF	DEN	Jesper Lindstrøm *	0 (1)	0	0	0	0 (1)	0
21	DF	DEN	Joakim Mæhle	5 (1)	0	1	0	6 (1)	0
22	DF	FRA	Mathys Angely	0	0	0	0	0	0
23	FW	DEN	Jonas Wind	2 (2)	0	0	0	2 (2)	0
24	MF	DEN	Christian Eriksen	1 (3)	0	0	0	1 (3)	0
25	MF	GER	Aaron Zehnter	3 (1)	1	0	0	3 (1)	1
26	DF	FRA	Saël Kumbedi *	0 (1)	0	0	0	0 (1)	0
27	MF	GER	Maximilian Arnold	6	1	1	0	7	1
29	GK	GER	Marius Müller	0	0	0	0	0	0
30	GK	POL	Jakub Zieliński	0	0	0	0	0	0
31	MF	GER	Yannick Gerhardt	0 (1)	0	0 (1)	0	0 (2)	0
32	MF	SWE	Mattias Svanberg	3 (3)	1	0 (1)	2	3 (4)	3
33	DF	GER	David Odogu †	0	0	0	0	0	0
39	MF	AUT	Patrick Wimmer	5	0	1	0	6	0
40	MF	USA	Kevin Paredes	0	0	0	0	0	0

=== Transfers ===
==== In ====
Date	Pos.	Player	From	Fee	Ref.
24 June 2025	GK	Jakub Zieliński (POL)	Legia Warsaw	Undisclosed	
30 June 2025	DF	Aaron Zehnter (GER)	SC Paderborn	€4,500,000	
1 July 2025	DF	Denis Vavro (SVK)	F.C. Copenhagen	Undisclosed	
1 July 2025	FW	Mohamed Amoura (ALG)	Union Saint-Gilloise	€17,000,000	
5 July 2025	MF	Vinícius Souza (BRA)	Sheffield United	Undisclosed	
10 September 2025	MF	Christian Eriksen (DEN)	(Manchester United)	Free transfer	
1 January 2026	DF	Cleiton (BRA)	Flamengo	Free transfer	
1 January 2026	DF	Saël Kumbedi (FRA)	Lyon	€6,000,000	
20 January 2026	FW	Kento Shiogai (JPN)	NEC	€9,500,000	
2 February 2026	DF	Jonas Adjetey (GHA)	FC Basel	€10,000,000	

==== Loans in ====
Date from	Pos.	Player	From	Date until	Ref.
23 July 2025	MF	Jesper Lindstrøm (DEN)	SSC Napoli	End of season	
28 August 2025	DF	Saël Kumbedi (FRA)	Olympique Lyonnais	1 January 2026	
1 September 2025	DF	Jenson Seelt (NED)	Sunderland	End of season	
1 September 2025	FW	Adam Daghim (DEN)	Red Bull Salzburg	End of season	
2 February 2026	DF	Jeanuël Belocian (FRA)	Bayer Leverkusen	End of season	

==== Out ====
Date	Pos.	Player	To	Fee	Ref.
7 June 2025	GK	Philipp Schulze (GER)	SC Verl	Undisclosed	
26 June 2025	MF	Kofi Amoako (GER)	Dynamo Dresden	Undisclosed	
30 June 2025	FW	Kevin Behrens (GER)	(FC Lugano)	Released	
30 June 2025	FW	Bartosz Białek (POL)	(Darmstadt 98)	Released	
30 June 2025	MF	Bennit Bröger (GER)	(SC Paderborn)	Released	
30 June 2025	GK	Niklas Klinger (GER)		Released	
30 June 2025	FW	Lukas Nmecha (GER)	(Leeds United)	Free transfer	
30 June 2025	DF	Cédric Zesiger (SUI)	FC Augsburg	Undisclosed	
1 July 2025	DF	Sebastiaan Bornauw (BEL)	Leeds United	€6,000,000	
16 August 2025	FW	Tiago Tomás (POR)	VfB Stuttgart	€14,000,000	
1 September 2025	DF	David Odogu (GER)	AC Milan	€7,000,000	
2 September 2025	FW	Václav Černý (CZE)	Beşiktaş	Undisclosed	

==== Loans out ====
Date from	Pos.	Player	To	Date until	Ref.
4 July 2025	FW	Jakub Kamiński (POL)	1. FC Köln	End of season	
8 July 2025	DF	Nicolas Cozza (FRA)	Nantes	End of season	
10 July 2025	MF	Bartol Franjić (CRO)	Venezia	End of season	
22 August 2025	MF	Aster Vranckx (BEL)	Sassuolo	End of season	
16 January 2026	FW	Andreas Skov Olsen (DEN)	Rangers	End of season	
