= 2024–25 VfL Wolfsburg season =

VfL Wolfsburg
2024–25 season
- Managing directors: Peter Christiansen; Michael Meeske; Tim Schumacher
- Head coach: Ralph Hasenhüttl (until 4 May); Daniel Bauer (caretaker, from 4 May)
- Stadium: Volkswagen Arena
- Bundesliga: 11th
- DFB-Pokal: Quarter-finals
- Top goalscorer: League: Mohamed Amoura (10); All: Jonas Wind (11)
- Average home league attendance: 24,596
- Biggest win: RB Leipzig 1–5 VfL Wolfsburg
- Biggest defeat: Borussia Dortmund 4–0 VfL Wolfsburg
Home colours	Away colours	Third colours

The 2024–25 season was the 80th season in the history of VfL Wolfsburg, and the club's 28th consecutive season in the Bundesliga. In addition to the domestic league, the club participated in the DFB-Pokal.

== Players ==
=== First-team squad ===
As of 17 January 2025

Note: Flags indicate national team as defined under FIFA eligibility rules; some limited exceptions apply. Players may hold more than one non-FIFA nationality.

No.	Pos.	Nation	Player
1	GK	POL	Kamil Grabara
2	DF	GER	Kilian Fischer
3	DF	BEL	Sebastiaan Bornauw
4	DF	GRE	Konstantinos Koulierakis
6	MF	BEL	Aster Vranckx
7	FW	DEN	Andreas Skov Olsen
8	MF	TUR	Salih Özcan (on loan from Borussia Dortmund)
9	FW	ALG	Mohamed Amoura (on loan from Union Saint-Gilloise)
10	FW	GER	Lukas Nmecha
11	FW	POR	Tiago Tomás
12	GK	AUT	Pavao Pervan
13	DF	BRA	Rogério
14	FW	POL	Bartosz Białek
16	FW	POL	Jakub Kamiński

No.	Pos.	Nation	Player
17	FW	GER	Kevin Behrens
18	DF	SVK	Denis Vavro (on loan from Copenhagen)
19	MF	CRO	Lovro Majer
21	DF	DEN	Joakim Mæhle
22	DF	FRA	Mathys Angely
23	FW	DEN	Jonas Wind
24	MF	GER	Bence Dárdai
27	MF	GER	Maximilian Arnold (captain)
29	GK	GER	Marius Müller
30	GK	GER	Niklas Klinger
31	MF	GER	Yannick Gerhardt
32	MF	SWE	Mattias Svanberg
39	FW	AUT	Patrick Wimmer
40	MF	USA	Kevin Paredes

=== Players out on loan ===
Note: Flags indicate national team as defined under FIFA eligibility rules; some limited exceptions apply. Players may hold more than one non-FIFA nationality.

No.	Pos.	Nation	Player
—	GK	GER	Philipp Schulze (at SC Verl until 30 June 2025)
—	DF	GER	Manuel Braun (at Waldhof Mannheim until 30 June 2025)
—	DF	FRA	Nicolas Cozza (at Nantes until 30 June 2025)
—	DF	GER	Moritz Jenz (at Mainz 05 until 30 June 2025)

No.	Pos.	Nation	Player
—	MF	GER	Kofi Amoako (at VfL Osnabrück until 30 June 2025)
—	MF	CRO	Bartol Franjić (at Shakhtar Donetsk until 30 June 2025)
—	FW	CZE	Václav Černý (at Rangers until 30 June 2025)
—	FW	GER	Dženan Pejčinović (at Fortuna Düsseldorf until 30 June 2025)

== Transfers ==
=== In ===
Pos.	Player	Transferred from	Fee	Date	Source
MF	(Germany) Bence Dárdai	(Germany) Hertha BSC	Free	1 July 2024	
GK	(Poland) Kamil Grabara	(Denmark) Copenhagen	€13,500,000	1 July 2024	
GK	(Germany) Marius Müller	(Germany) Schalke 04	€1,500,000	1 July 2024	
FW	(Algeria) Mohamed Amoura	(Belgium) Union Saint-Gilloise	Loan	8 July 2024	
DF	(France) Mathys Angely	(France) Bordeaux	Free	13 August 2024	
MF	(Turkey) Salih Özcan	(Germany) Borussia Dortmund	Loan	28 August 2024	
DF	(Greece) Konstantinos Koulierakis	(Greece) PAOK	€11,750,000	29 August 2024	
DF	(Slovakia) Denis Vavro	(Denmark) Copenhagen	Loan	30 August 2024	
MF	(Croatia) Bartol Franjić	(Ukraine) Shakhtar Donetsk	Loan return	3 January 2025	
FW	(Denmark) Andreas Skov Olsen	(Belgium) Club Brugge	€14,000,000	17 January 2025	

=== Out ===
Pos.	Player	Transferred to	Fee	Date	Source
MF	(Czech Republic) Lukáš Ambros	(Poland) Górnik Zabrze	Free	1 July 2024	
MF	(United States) Ulysses Llanez	Free agent	End of contract	1 July 2024	
FW	(Germany) Maximilian Philipp	(Germany) SC Freiburg	€1,000,000	1 July 2024	
GK	(Belgium) Koen Casteels	(Saudi Arabia) Al Qadsiah	Free	1 July 2024	
FW	(Germany) Luca Waldschmidt	(Germany) 1. FC Köln	Free	1 July 2024	
DF	(Germany) Felix Lange	(Germany) SV Meppen	Free	1 July 2024	
GK	(Germany) Philipp Schulze	(Germany) SC Verl	Loan	1 July 2024	
MF	(Croatia) Bartol Franjić	(Ukraine) Shakhtar Donetsk	Loan	9 July 2024	
FW	(Germany) Dženan Pejčinović	(Germany) Fortuna Düsseldorf	Loan	19 July 2024	
MF	(Czech Republic) Václav Černý	(Scotland) Rangers	Loan	26 July 2024	
MF	(Germany) Kofi Amoako	(Germany) VfL Osnabrück	Loan	12 August 2024	
DF	(France) Nicolas Cozza	(France) Nantes	Loan	28 August 2024	
DF	(Germany) Moritz Jenz	(Germany) Mainz 05	Loan	28 August 2024	
DF	(France) Maxence Lacroix	(England) Crystal Palace	€18,000,000	30 August 2024	
DF	(Germany) Manuel Braun	(Germany) Waldhof Mannheim	Loan	2 September 2024	
MF	(Croatia) Bartol Franjić	(Croatia) Dinamo Zagreb	Loan	10 January 2025	
MF	(Germany) Ridle Baku	(Germany) RB Leipzig	€4,500,000	10 January 2025	
DF	(Switzerland) Cedric Zesiger	(Germany) FC Augsburg	Loan	14 January 2025	

== Pre-season and friendlies ==
The official commencement of training was on 11 July. Between 1 and 9 August, the VfL Wolfsburg team participated in a training camp located in Schladming, Austria.

13 July 2024 Friendly	VfL Wolfsburg	9–0	Beck’s XI	Wolfsburg
16:00 CEST (UTC+2)	Kamiński 16'; Akaegbobi 18'; Fischer 23', 30', 41'; Bröger 40'; Behrens 43'; Baku 66'; Tomás 88'	Report		Stadium: Drömlingstadion; Attendance: 1,300

20 July 2024 Gala match	Anderlecht	2–1	VfL Wolfsburg	Anderlecht, Belgium
13:30 CEST (UTC+2)	Engwanda (yellow card) 15'; Dolberg 66'; Angulo 69'	Report	Amoura 14'; Dárdai (yellow card) 72'	Stadium: Lotto Park; Attendance: 15,000; Referee: Lawrence Visser (Belgium)

24 July 2024 Friendly	VfL Wolfsburg	1–0	Lille	Rheda-Wiedenbrück
16:30 CEST (UTC+2)	Behrens 54' (pen.)	Report	Diakité (yellow card) 22'; André (yellow card) 25'; Virginius (yellow card) 80'; Malouda (yellow card) 88'	Stadium: Jahnstadion; Attendance: 350; Referee: Yannick Rupert (Germany)

27 July 2024 Friendly	Hannover 96	3–2	VfL Wolfsburg	Hanover
15:30 CEST (UTC+2)	Halstenberg 8' (pen.); Dehm (yellow card) 19'; Tresoldi 47'; Ngankam 88'	Report	Kamiński 11'; Amoako (yellow card) 39'; Amoura 44'; Arnold (yellow card) 64'	Stadium: 96 Das Stadion; Attendance: 2,200; Referee: Lukas Benen

3 August 2024 Friendly	Como	0–0	VfL Wolfsburg	Irdning, Austria
15:30 CEST (UTC+2)	Goldaniga (yellow card) 67'	Report	Lacroix (yellow card) 65'	Stadium: ATV-Riesneralm-Arena Irdning; Attendance: 350

9 August 2024 Friendly	Brentford	4–4	VfL Wolfsburg	Brentford, England
19:45 BST (UTC+1)	Mbeumo 17'; Wissa 20'; Jensen 65'; Schade 81'	Report	Wimmer 34', 85'; Lacroix 41'; Arnold 78'	Stadium: Brentford Community Stadium; Attendance: 10,633; Referee: Simon Hooper (England)

6 September 2024 Friendly	VfL Wolfsburg	2–1	Hannover 96	Wolfsburg
12:00 CEST (UTC+2)	Akaegbobi 6'; Behrens 57'	Report	Momuluh 80'	Stadium: Volkswagen Arena; Attendance: 0

== Competitions ==
=== Overall record ===
Competition	First match	Last match	Starting round	Final position	Record							
Competition	First match	Last match	Starting round	Final position	Pld	W	D	L	GF	GA	GD	Win %
Bundesliga	25 August 2024	17 May 2025	Matchday 1	11th	34	11	10	13	56	54	+2	32.35
DFB-Pokal	19 August 2024	26 February 2025	First round	Quarter-finals	4	3	0	1	5	1	+4	75.00
Total					38	14	10	14	61	55	+6	36.84

Source: Soccerway

=== Bundesliga ===
==== League table ====
Pos	Team	Pld	W	D	L	GF	GA	GD	Pts	Qualification or relegation
9	VfB Stuttgart	34	14	8	12	64	53	+11	50	Qualification for the Europa League league phase (Note: VfB Stuttgart qualified for the Europa League league phase by winning the 2024–25 DFB-Pokal.)
10	Borussia Mönchengladbach	34	13	6	15	55	57	−2	45	
11	VfL Wolfsburg	34	11	10	13	56	54	+2	43	
12	FC Augsburg	34	11	10	13	35	51	−16	43	
13	Union Berlin	34	10	10	14	35	51	−16	40	

Source: Bundesliga
Rules for classification: 1) Points; 2) Goal difference; 3) Goals scored; 4) Head-to-head results; 5) Head-to-head away goals scored; 6) Away goals scored; 7) Play-off.
(Rules 4–6 only apply after home and away matches have been played between the tied teams.)

==== Results summary ====
Overall								Home						Away					
Pld	W	D	L	GF	GA	GD	Pts	W	D	L	GF	GA	GD	W	D	L	GF	GA	GD
34	11	10	13	56	54	+2	43	3	7	7	27	30	−3	8	3	6	29	24	+5

Source: DFB

==== Results by round ====
Round	1	2	3	4	5	6	7	8	9	10	11	12	13	14	15	16	17	18	19	20	21	22	23	24	25	26	27	28	29	30	31	32	33	34	35	36	37	38	39	40
Ground	H	A	H	A	H	A	H	A	H	A	H	A	H	A	H	A	H	A	H	A	H	A	H	A	H	A	H	A	H	H	A	A	H	H	A	U	H	A	W/O	
Result	L	W	L	L	D	W	L	D	D	W	W	W	W	L	L	W	W	L	D	D	D	W	D	W	D	L	L	D	L	L	L	L	L	L	D	D	D	D	W	L
Position	14	6	12	13	13	12	13	14	14	12	11	8	5	10	11	10	7	7	7	10	9	3	4	7	9	11	13	15	16	16	16	16	17	16	16	17	16	15	16	17

Updated to match(es) played on 15 March 2025. Source: DFB
A = Away; H = Home; W = Win; D = Draw; L = Loss

==== Matches ====
The league schedule was released on 4 July 2024.

25 August 2024 1	VfL Wolfsburg	2–3	Bayern Munich	Wolfsburg
15:30 CEST (UTC+2)	Majer 47' (pen.), 55'; Svanberg (yellow card) 71'; Zesiger (yellow card) 82'	Report	Musiala 20', (yellow card) 70'; Kane (yellow card) 31'; Boey (yellow card) 46'; Kamiński 65' (o.g.); Gnabry 82'	Stadium: Volkswagen Arena; Attendance: 30,000; Referee: Daniel Siebert

31 August 2024 2	Holstein Kiel	0–2	VfL Wolfsburg	Kiel
15:30 CEST (UTC+2)	Bernhardsson (yellow card) 48'; Knudsen (yellow card) 58'; Arp (yellow card) 90+7'; Geschwill (yellow card) 90+9'	Report	Svanberg (yellow card) 19'; Arnold 27', (yellow card) 89'; Bornauw 30'; Wimmer (yellow card) 35'; Baku (yellow card) 41'; Fischer (yellow card) 43'; Tomás (yellow card) 51'; Zesiger (yellow card) 77'	Stadium: Holstein-Stadion; Attendance: 15,034; Referee: Florian Exner

14 September 2024 3	VfL Wolfsburg	1–2	Eintracht Frankfurt	Wolfsburg
15:30 CEST (UTC+2)	Baku 76'; Arnold (yellow card) 80'	Report	Skhiri (yellow card) 25'; Marmoush 30', 82' (pen.); Chaïbi (yellow card) 46'	Stadium: Volkswagen Arena; Attendance: 26,281; Referee: Harm Osmers

22 September 2024 4	Bayer Leverkusen	4–3	VfL Wolfsburg	Leverkusen
15:30 CEST (UTC+2)	Wirtz 14'; Tah 32'; Belocian (yellow card) 36'; Grimaldo (yellow card) 45+5'; Hincapié 49'; Adli (yellow card) 51'; Frimpong (yellow card) 88'; Boniface 90+3'	Report	Mukiele 5' (o.g.); Bornauw 37'; Svanberg 45+1'; Tomás (yellow card) 50'; Zesiger (yellow card) 80'; Gerhardt (red card) 88'; Grabara (yellow card) 90+1'; Arnold (yellow card) 90+1'; Kamiński (yellow card) 90+7'	Stadium: BayArena; Attendance: 29,250; Referee: Sascha Stegemann

28 September 2024 5	VfL Wolfsburg	2–2	VfB Stuttgart	Wolfsburg
15:30 CET (UTC+1)	Wind 20'; Bornauw (yellow card) 45+1'; Arnold (yellow card) 55'; Amoura 68', (yellow card) 79'; Vranckx (yellow card) 90+2'; Koulierakis (yellow card) 90+4'	Report	Karazor (yellow card) 24' (yellow-red card) 63'; Millot (penalty missed) 32', 32'; Undav 90+7'	Stadium: Volkswagen Arena; Attendance: 27,135; Referee: Sven Jablonski

5 October 2024 6	VfL Bochum	1–3	VfL Wolfsburg	Bochum
15:30	Medić (yellow card) 38'; Boadu 72'	Report	Tomás 21'; Wind 37', 88' (yellow card) 38'; Amoura (yellow card) 56'	Stadium: Vonovia Ruhrstadion; Attendance: 24,630; Referee: Max Burda

20 October 2024 7	VfL Wolfsburg	2–4	Werder Bremen	Wolfsburg
17:30	Tomás 19'; Arnold (yellow card) 42'; Wimmer (red card) 68'; Mæhle 79'	Report	Weiser 45+5'; Agu 51'; Ducksch 67'; Grüll 72'; Deman (yellow card) 87'	Stadium: Volkswagen Arena; Attendance: 28,917; Referee: Daniel Schlager

26 October 2024 8	FC St. Pauli	0–0	VfL Wolfsburg	Hamburg
15:30		Report	Kamiński (yellow card) 76'; Mæhle (yellow card) 81'; Majer (yellow card) 90'	Stadium: Millerntor-Stadion; Attendance: 29,546; Referee: Tobias Reichel

2 November 2024 9	VfL Wolfsburg	1–1	FC Augsburg	Wolfsburg
15:30	Amoura 82', (yellow card) 88'	Report	Tietz 34'; Matsima (yellow card) 74'; Rexhbecaj (yellow card) 77'; Essende (yellow card) 87'	Stadium: Volkswagen Arena; Attendance: 22,654; Referee: Felix Brych

10 November 2024 10	1. FC Heidenheim	1–3	VfL Wolfsburg	Heidenheim
19:30 CET (UTC+1)	Dorsch (yellow card) 29'; Föhrenbach (yellow card) 45+1'; Pieringer 64'	Report	Gerhardt 3'; Dardai 42'; Fischer (yellow card) 48'; Wimmer (yellow card) 70'; Zesiger (yellow card) 74'; Grabara (yellow card) 78'; Tomás (yellow card) 84', (goal) 90'; Behrens (yellow card) 90+1'	Stadium: Voith-Arena; Attendance: 15,000; Referee: Harm Osmers

23 November 2024 11	VfL Wolfsburg	1–0	Union Berlin	Wolfsburg
15:30	Wimmer (yellow card) 15'; R.Baku 71'	Report	Vogt (yellow card) 45+1'; Bénes (yellow card) 90+2'	Stadium: Volkswagen Arena; Attendance: 23,861; Referee: Tobias Stieler

30 November 2024 12	RB Leipzig	1–5	VfL Wolfsburg	Leipzig
15:30	Baumgartner (yellow card) 26'; Vermeeren (yellow card) 52'; Orbán 82'	Report	Amoura 4', 16'; Tomás 5'; Fischer (yellow card) 57'; Mæhle 64'; Behrens 90+1'	Stadium: Red Bull Arena; Attendance: 44,000; Referee: Martin Petersen

8 December 2024 13	VfL Wolfsburg	4–3	Mainz 05	Wolfsburg
15:30	Amoura 19'; Baku (yellow card) 21'; Arnold (yellow card) 22'; Tomás 57', (yellow card) 68'; Wind 84', 90+4'	Report	Nebel 11', 66'; Henriksen (yellow card) 27'; Burkardt 39'; Amiri (yellow card) 43'; Lee (yellow card) 45+2'; Kohr (yellow card) 56'; Leitsch (yellow card) 90+1'	Stadium: Volkswagen Arena; Attendance: 20,036; Referee: Timo Gerach

13 December 2024 14	SC Freiburg	3–2	VfL Wolfsburg	Freiburg im Breisgau
20:30	Kübler (yellow card) 22', (goal) 42', 51'; Gregoritsch (yellow card) 31', (goal) 61'; Rosenfelder (yellow card) 76'; Eggestein (yellow card) 85'	Report	Wind 75'; Svanberg 83'; Vavro (yellow card) 88'	Stadium: Europa-Park Stadion; Attendance: 32,600; Referee: Sascha Stegemann

22 December 2024 15	VfL Wolfsburg	1–3	Borussia Dortmund	Wolfsburg
17:30	Koulierakis (yellow card) 50'; Gerhardt (yellow card) 55'; Vavro 58', (yellow card) 70'	Report	Malen 25', (yellow card) 63'; Beier 28'; Brandt 30'; Groß (red card) 62'; Couto (yellow card) 90+4'	Stadium: Volkswagen Arena; Attendance: 28,917; Referee: Matthias Jöllenbeck

11 January 2025 16	TSG Hoffenheim	0–1	VfL Wolfsburg	Sinsheim
15:30	Moerstedt (yellow card) 68'	Report	Tomás (yellow card) 8'; Amoura 29'; Vavro (yellow card) 83'	Stadium: Rhein-Neckar-Arena; Attendance: 18,114; Referee: Christian Dingert

14 January 2025 17	VfL Wolfsburg	5–1	Borussia Mönchengladbach	Wolfsburg
20:30	Wind 3' (pen.); Arnold (yellow card) 41', (goal) 75'; Mæhle 60'; Nmecha 84', 87'	Report	Fukuda 89'	Stadium: Volkswagen Arena; Attendance: 20,519; Referee: Florian Badstübner

18 January 2025 18	Bayern Munich	3–2	VfL Wolfsburg	Munich
15:30	Goretzka 20', 62'; Olise 39'; Kimmich (yellow card) 79'; Laimer (yellow card) 83'	Report	Amoura 24', 88'; Mæhle (yellow card) 45+2'; Wimmer (yellow card) 61'; Fischer (yellow card) 90+5'	Stadium: Allianz Arena; Attendance: 75,000; Referee: Tobias Reichel

24 January 2025 19	VfL Wolfsburg	2–2	Holstein Kiel	Wolfsburg
20:30	Wimmer 50', (yellow card) 60'; Wind 53'; Mæhle (yellow card) 90+1'	Report	Zec 13', (yellow card) 23'; Skrzybski 80'; Remberg (yellow card) 90+1'; Arp (yellow card) 90+2'; Pichler (yellow card) 90+1'	Stadium: Volkswagen Arena; Attendance: 22,103; Referee: Sven Jablonski

1 February 2025 20	Eintracht Frankfurt	1–1	VfL Wolfsburg	Frankfurt
15:30	Bahoya (yellow card) 72'; Uzun 81'	Report	Mæhle (yellow card) 45+1'; Tuta 50' (o.g.); Svanberg (yellow card) 71'; Gerhardt (yellow card) 90+7'	Stadium: Deutsche Bank Park; Attendance: 56,900; Referee: Benjamin Brand

8 February 2025 21	VfL Wolfsburg	0–0	Bayer Leverkusen	Wolfsburg
15:30	Mæhle (yellow card) 75'; Koulierakis (yellow card) 90+7'	Report	Boniface (yellow card) 15'; Andrich (yellow card) 37'; Mukiele (yellow card) 77'	Stadium: Volkswagen Arena; Referee: Sascha Stegemann

15 February 2025 22	VfB Stuttgart	1–2	VfL Wolfsburg	Stuttgart
15:30	Chabot (yellow card) 45+1'; Karazor (yellow card) 45+4'; Woltemade 72'; Hendriks (yellow card) 90+3'	Report	Fischer (yellow card) 8'; Gerhardt (yellow card) 45+5'; Svanberg (yellow card) 76'; Tomás 77'; Amoura 87' (pen.); Behrens (yellow card) 90+3'	Stadium: MHPArena; Attendance: 58,000; Referee: Tobias Welz

22 February 2025 23	VfL Wolfsburg	1–1	Holstein Kiel	Wolfsburg
15:30	Wind (yellow card) 66'; Svanberg 81'; Bornauw (yellow card) 86'	Report	Bero (yellow card) 7'; Mašović 50'; Ordets (yellow card) 72'; Wittek (yellow card) 90'	Stadium: Volkswagen Arena; Attendance: 23,772; Referee: Timo Gerach

1 March 2025 24	Werder Bremen	1–2	VfL Wolfsburg	Bremen
15:30	Burke (yellow card) 70'; Weiser 90'; Veljković (yellow card) 90+1'	Report	Wimmer 6', 48'	Stadium: Weserstadion; Attendance: 41,152; Referee: Felix Brych

8 March 2025 25	VfL Wolfsburg	1–1	FC St. Pauli	Wolfsburg
15:30	Amoura (yellow card) 46', (goal) 70' (pen.)	Report	Van der Heyden 38'	Stadium: Volkswagen Arena; Attendance: 28,917; Referee: Robert Hartmann

15 March 2025 26	FC Augsburg	1–0	VfL Wolfsburg	Augsburg
15:30	Tietz 53'; Gouweleeuw (yellow card) 90+6'	Report	Amoura (yellow card) 30'; Tomás (yellow card) 90+6'	Stadium: WWK Arena; Attendance: 28,351; Referee: Martin Petersen

29 March 2025 27	VfL Wolfsburg	0–1	1. FC Heidenheim	Wolfsburg
15:30	Gerhardt (yellow card) 51'; Nmecha (yellow card) 90+3'	Report	Pieringer 16' (pen.); Siersleben (yellow card) 32'; Beck (yellow card) 43'; Schöppner (yellow card) 51'; Dorsch (yellow card) 74'	Stadium: Volkswagen Arena; Attendance: 21,545; Referee: Bastian Dankert

6 April 2025 28	Union Berlin	1–0	VfL Wolfsburg	Berlin
17:30	Hollerbach 63'	Report	Gerhardt (yellow card) 77'	Stadium: Stadion An der Alten Försterei; Attendance: 22,012; Referee: Harm Osmers

11 April 2025 29	VfL Wolfsburg	2–3	RB Leipzig	Wolfsburg
20:30 CEST (UTC+2)	Gerhardt (yellow card) 34'; Fischer 58', (yellow card) 60'; Olsen 75'	Report	Openda 11', (yellow card) 76'; Simons 26', 49', (yellow card) 36'; Bitshiabu (yellow card) 36'	Stadium: Volkswagen Arena; Attendance: 23,070; Referee: Florian Exner

19 April 2025 30	Mainz 05	2–2	VfL Wolfsburg	Mainz
15:30 CEST (UTC+2)	Lee Jae-sung 37'; Kohr 40', (yellow card) 51'; Veratschnig (yellow card) 67'	Report	Arnold 3'; Tomás (yellow card) 68'; Vavro 89', (yellow card) 90+3'; Mæhle (yellow card) 90'	Stadium: Mewa Arena; Attendance: 31,500; Referee: Felix Zwayer

26 April 2025 31	VfL Wolfsburg	0–1	SC Freiburg	Wolfsburg

3 May 2025 32	Borussia Dortmund	4–0	VfL Wolfsburg	Dortmund
				Stadium: Signal Iduna Park

9 May 2025 33	VfL Wolfsburg	2–2	TSG Hoffenheim	Wolfsburg

17 May 2025 34	Borussia Mönchengladbach	0–1	VfL Wolfsburg	Mönchengladbach

=== DFB-Pokal ===
19 August 2024 First round	TuS Koblenz	0–1	VfL Wolfsburg	Koblenz
18:00 CEST (UTC+2)	Zeghli (yellow card) 17'; Yaman (red card) 78'; Von der Bracke (yellow card) 80'; Blagojevic (yellow card) 82'; Tuchscherer (yellow card) 88'; Grgić (yellow card) 90'	Report	Wimmer 15'; Bornauw (yellow card) 25'; Svanberg (yellow card) 77'	Stadium: Stadion Oberwerth; Attendance: 9,447; Referee: Sören Storks

29 October 2024 Second round	VfL Wolfsburg	1–0 (a.e.t.)	Borussia Dortmund	Wolfsburg
20:45 CET (UTC+1)	Arnold (yellow card) 62'; Özcan (yellow card) 114'; Wind 117'	Report	Nmecha (yellow card) 56'; Gittens (yellow card) 86'; Schlotterbeck (yellow card) 115'; Bensebaini (yellow card) 120'	Stadium: Volkswagen Arena; Attendance: 30,000; Referee: Daniel Siebert

4 December 2024 Round of 16	VfL Wolfsburg	3–0	TSG Hoffenheim	Wolfsburg
18:00 CET (UTC+1)	Arnold (yellow card) 14'; Dárdai (yellow card) 53'; Vavro 63' (Arnold); Wind 67' (Baku); Gerhardt 85' (Wind)	Report	Kramarić (yellow card) 66'; Baumann (yellow card) 85'	Stadium: Volkswagen Arena; Attendance: 13,909; Referee: Daniel Schlager

26 February 2025 Quarter-finals	RB Leipzig	1–0	VfL Wolfsburg	Leipzig
20:45
