= 2025–26 Bundesliga =

Bundesliga
- Season: 2025–26
- Dates: 22 August 2025 – 16 May 2026
- Champions: Bayern Munich; 34th Bundesliga title 35th German title
- Relegated: VfL Wolfsburg (via play-off); 1. FC Heidenheim; FC St. Pauli
- Champions League: Bayern Munich; Borussia Dortmund; RB Leipzig; VfB Stuttgart
- Europa League: TSG Hoffenheim; Bayer Leverkusen
- Conference League: SC Freiburg
- Matches: 306
- Goals: 990 (3.24 per match)
- Top goalscorer: Harry Kane (36 goals)
- Biggest home win: Munich 8–1 Wolfsburg
- Biggest away win: Augsburg 0–6 Leipzig
- Highest scoring: Mönchengladbach 4–6 Frankfurt
- Longest winning run: 9 games Munich
- Longest unbeaten run: 18 games Munich
- Longest winless run: 15 games Heidenheim
- Longest losing run: 9 games St. Pauli
- Highest attendance: 81,365 sixteen games
- Lowest attendance: 13,000; Heidenheim v Wolfsburg
- Attendance: 12,947,047 (42,311 per match)

The 2025–26 Bundesliga was the 63rd season of the Bundesliga, Germany's premier men's football competition. Bayern Munich were the defending champions. The season began on 22 August 2025 and concluded on 16 May 2026.

On 19 April 2026, Bayern Munich were crowned Bundesliga champions for the 34th time (their 35th overall German title) with four matches to spare following a 4–2 win over VfB Stuttgart. Bayern also broke their own Bundesliga single-season goals record (101, set in 1971–72) with five matches remaining, ultimately finishing the campaign with 122 league goals. Among Europe's top five leagues, this season tally ranks as the second-highest in history, behind only Torino's 125 goals in 1947–48 (which had six more matches). Bayern's 3.59 goals per match is likewise the second-highest in those leagues, trailing only Athletic Bilbao's 4.06 goals per game in 1930–31.

The fixtures were released on 27 June 2025.

== Teams ==
Locations of the 2025–26 Bundesliga teams

=== Team changes ===
Promoted from 2024–25 2. Bundesliga	Relegated from 2024–25 Bundesliga
1. FC Köln; Hamburger SV	Holstein Kiel; VfL Bochum

Hamburger SV and 1. FC Köln returned to the Bundesliga after seven and one year absences, respectively. They replaced Holstein Kiel and VfL Bochum after spending time in the top flight for one and four years respectively.

=== Stadiums and locations ===
Team	Location	Stadium	Capacity	R.
FC Augsburg	Augsburg	WWK Arena	30,660	
Union Berlin	Berlin	Stadion An der Alten Försterei	22,012	
Werder Bremen	Bremen	Weserstadion	42,100	
Borussia Dortmund	Dortmund	Signal Iduna Park	81,365	
Eintracht Frankfurt	Frankfurt	Deutsche Bank Park	59,500	
SC Freiburg	Freiburg im Breisgau	Europa-Park Stadion	34,700	
Hamburger SV	Hamburg	Volksparkstadion	57,000	
1. FC Heidenheim	Heidenheim	Voith-Arena	15,000	
TSG Hoffenheim	Sinsheim	PreZero Arena	30,150	
1. FC Köln	Cologne	RheinEnergieStadion	49,698	
RB Leipzig	Leipzig	Red Bull Arena	47,800	
Bayer Leverkusen	Leverkusen	BayArena	30,210	
Mainz 05	Mainz	MEWA Arena	33,305	
Borussia Mönchengladbach	Mönchengladbach	Borussia-Park	54,057	
Bayern Munich	Munich	Allianz Arena	75,024	
FC St. Pauli	Hamburg	Millerntor-Stadion	29,546	
VfB Stuttgart	Stuttgart	MHPArena	60,058	
VfL Wolfsburg	Wolfsburg	Volkswagen Arena	30,000	

=== Personnel and kits ===
Team	Manager	Captain	Kit manufacturer	Shirt sponsor	
Team	Manager	Captain	Kit manufacturer	Front	Sleeve
FC Augsburg	(Germany) Manuel Baum	(Netherlands) Jeffrey Gouweleeuw	Mizuno	WWK Versicherung	Siegmund
Union Berlin	(Germany) Marie-Louise Eta (interim)	(Austria) Christopher Trimmel	Adidas	Raisin Bank	Kermi
Werder Bremen	(Germany) Daniel Thioune	(Austria) Marco Friedl	Hummel	Matthäi	Ammerländer / Harald Pihl (Note: In cup matches)
Borussia Dortmund	(Croatia) Niko Kovač	(Germany) Emre Can	Puma	Vodafone	Polestar
Eintracht Frankfurt	(Spain) Albert Riera	(Germany) Robin Koch	Adidas	Indeed.com	Deutsche Vermögensberatung / Generali (Note: In cup and European matches)
SC Freiburg	(Germany) Julian Schuster	(Germany) Christian Günter	Nike	JobRad	Lexware
Hamburger SV	(Germany) Merlin Polzin	(Denmark) Yussuf Poulsen	Adidas	HanseMerkur	Plan International / Helm Pharma
1. FC Heidenheim	(Germany) Frank Schmidt	(Germany) Patrick Mainka	Puma	MHP	Voith
TSG Hoffenheim	(Austria) Christian Ilzer	(Germany) Oliver Baumann	Joma	SAP	ProMinent Group / Sparkasse Kraichgau
1. FC Köln	(Germany) René Wagner	(Germany) Marvin Schwäbe	Hummel	REWE	DEVK
RB Leipzig	(Germany) Ole Werner	(Germany) David Raum	Puma	Red Bull	Kraken / IHG Hotels & Resorts
Bayer Leverkusen	(Denmark) Kasper Hjulmand	(Germany) Robert Andrich	New Balance	BarmeniaGothaer	Niedax / Talcid
Mainz 05	(Switzerland) Urs Fischer	(Switzerland) Silvan Widmer	Jako	Kömmerling	iDM Wärmepumpen
Borussia Mönchengladbach	(Poland) Eugen Polanski	(Germany) Tim Kleindienst	Puma	Reuter Gruppe	Sonepar
Bayern Munich	(Belgium) Vincent Kompany	(Germany) Manuel Neuer	Adidas	Deutsche Telekom	Allianz / Audi
FC St. Pauli	(Germany) Alexander Blessin	(Australia) Jackson Irvine	Puma	Congstar	Astra Bier
VfB Stuttgart	(Germany) Sebastian Hoeneß	(Turkey) Atakan Karazor	Jako	Landesbank Baden-Württemberg	hep solar
VfL Wolfsburg	(Germany) Dieter Hecking	(Germany) Maximilian Arnold	Nike	Volkswagen	Mobileye

=== Managerial changes ===
Team	Outgoing	Manner	Exit date		Position in table	Incoming	Incoming date		Ref.
Team	Outgoing	Manner	Announced on	Departed on	Position in table	Incoming	Announced on	Arrived on	Ref.
RB Leipzig	(Hungary) Zsolt Lőw	End of caretaker spell	30 March 2025	30 June 2025	Pre-season	(Germany) Ole Werner	24 June 2025	1 July 2025	
VfL Wolfsburg	(Germany) Daniel Bauer	End of caretaker spell	4 May 2025	30 June 2025	Pre-season	(Netherlands) Paul Simonis	12 June 2025	1 July 2025	
1. FC Köln	(Germany) Friedhelm Funkel	End of caretaker spell	5 May 2025	30 June 2025	Pre-season	(Poland) Lukas Kwasniok	6 June 2025	1 July 2025	
Bayer Leverkusen	(Spain) Xabi Alonso	Mutual consent	9 May 2025	30 June 2025	Pre-season	(Netherlands) Erik ten Hag	26 May 2025	1 July 2025	
FC Augsburg	(Denmark) Jess Thorup	Sacked	23 May 2025	30 June 2025	Pre-season	(Germany) Sandro Wagner	28 May 2025	1 July 2025	
Werder Bremen	(Germany) Ole Werner	Sacked	27 May 2025	30 June 2025	Pre-season	(Germany) Horst Steffen	29 May 2025	1 July 2025	
Bayer Leverkusen	(Netherlands) Erik ten Hag	Sacked	1 September 2025		12th	(Denmark) Kasper Hjulmand	8 September 2025		
Borussia Mönchengladbach	(Switzerland) Gerardo Seoane	Sacked	15 September 2025		16th	(Poland) Eugen Polanski (Note: Polanski was initially appointed as interim manager, before being appointed permanent manager on 18 November 2025.)	15 September 2025		
VfL Wolfsburg	(Netherlands) Paul Simonis	Sacked	9 November 2025		14th	(Germany) Daniel Bauer	9 November 2025		
FC Augsburg	(Germany) Sandro Wagner	Mutual consent	1 December 2025		14th	(Germany) Manuel Baum (Note: Baum was initially appointed as caretaker manager, before being appointed permanent manager on 23 December 2025.)	1 December 2025		
Mainz 05	(Denmark) Bo Henriksen	Mutual consent	3 December 2025		18th	(Germany) Benjamin Hoffmann (interim)	3 December 2025		
Mainz 05	(Germany) Benjamin Hoffmann	End of caretaker spell	7 December 2025		18th	(Switzerland) Urs Fischer	7 December 2025		
Eintracht Frankfurt	(Germany) Dino Toppmöller	Sacked	18 January 2026		7th	(Germany) Dennis Schmitt (interim)	18 January 2026		
Eintracht Frankfurt	(Germany) Dennis Schmitt	End of caretaker spell	30 January 2026	2 February 2026	8th	(Spain) Albert Riera	30 January 2026	2 February 2026	
Werder Bremen	(Germany) Horst Steffen	Sacked	1 February 2026		15th	(Germany) Daniel Thioune	4 February 2026		
VfL Wolfsburg	(Germany) Daniel Bauer	Sacked	8 March 2026		17th	(Germany) Dieter Hecking	8 March 2026		
1. FC Köln	(Poland) Lukas Kwasniok	Sacked	22 March 2026		15th	(Germany) René Wagner (Note: Wagner was initially appointed as caretaker manager, before being appointed permanent manager on 22 May 2026.)	22 March 2026		
Union Berlin	(Germany) Steffen Baumgart	Sacked	11 April 2026		11th	(Germany) Marie-Louise Eta (interim)	11 April 2026		

== League table ==
Pos	Team	Pld	W	D	L	GF	GA	GD	Pts	Qualification or relegation
1	Bayern Munich (C)	34	28	5	1	122	36	+86	89	Qualification for the Champions League league phase
2	Borussia Dortmund	34	22	7	5	70	34	+36	73	Qualification for the Champions League league phase
3	RB Leipzig	34	20	5	9	66	47	+19	65	Qualification for the Champions League league phase
4	VfB Stuttgart	34	18	8	8	71	49	+22	62	Qualification for the Champions League league phase
5	TSG Hoffenheim	34	18	7	9	65	52	+13	61	Qualification for the Europa League league phase (Note: The 2025–26 DFB-Pokal winners qualified for the Europa League league phase. Since the DFB-Pokal winners, Bayern Munich, qualified for the Champions League, the Europa League spot passed to the sixth-placed team, and the Conference League spot passed to the seventh-placed team.)
6	Bayer Leverkusen	34	17	8	9	68	47	+21	59	Qualification for the Europa League league phase
7	SC Freiburg	34	13	8	13	51	57	−6	47	Qualification for the Conference League play-off round
8	Eintracht Frankfurt	34	11	11	12	61	65	−4	44	
9	FC Augsburg	34	12	7	15	45	61	−16	43	
10	Mainz 05	34	10	10	14	44	53	−9	40	
11	Union Berlin	34	10	9	15	44	58	−14	39	
12	Borussia Mönchengladbach	34	9	11	14	42	53	−11	38	
13	Hamburger SV	34	9	11	14	40	54	−14	38	
14	1. FC Köln	34	7	11	16	49	63	−14	32	
15	Werder Bremen	34	8	8	18	37	60	−23	32	
16	VfL Wolfsburg (R)	34	7	8	19	45	69	−24	29	Qualification for the relegation play-offs
17	1. FC Heidenheim (R)	34	6	8	20	41	72	−31	26	Relegation to 2. Bundesliga
18	FC St. Pauli (R)	34	6	8	20	29	60	−31	26	Relegation to 2. Bundesliga

Source: Bundesliga
Rules for classification: 1) Points; 2) Goal difference; 3) Goals scored; 4) Head-to-head results; 5) Head-to-head away goals scored; 6) Away goals scored; 7) Play-off.
(Rules 4–6 only apply after home and away matches have been played between the tied teams.)
(C) Champions; (R) Relegated

== Results ==
Home \ Away	AUG	UNB	BRE	DOR	FRA	FRE	HAM	HEI	HOF	KÖL	LEI	LEV	MAI	MÖN	MUN	STP	STU	WOL
FC Augsburg	—	1–1	0–0	0–1	1–1	2–2	1–0	1–0	2–2	2–0	0–6	2–0	1–4	3–1	2–3	2–1	2–5	3–1
Union Berlin	4–0	—	1–4	0–3	1–1	0–0	0–0	1–2	2–4	2–2	3–1	1–0	2–2	3–1	2–2	1–1	2–1	1–2
Werder Bremen	1–3	1–0	—	0–2	3–3	0–3	3–1	2–0	0–2	1–1	1–2	3–3	0–2	1–1	0–3	1–0	0–4	2–1
Borussia Dortmund	2–0	3–0	3–0	—	3–2	4–0	3–2	3–2	2–0	1–0	1–1	0–1	4–0	2–0	2–3	3–2	3–3	1–0
Eintracht Frankfurt	1–0	3–4	4–1	3–3	—	2–0	1–2	1–0	1–3	2–2	1–3	1–3	1–0	3–0	0–3	2–0	2–2	1–1
SC Freiburg	1–3	0–1	1–0	1–1	2–2	—	2–1	2–1	1–1	2–1	4–1	3–3	4–0	2–1	2–3	2–1	3–1	1–1
Hamburger SV	1–1	3–2	3–2	1–1	1–1	3–2	—	2–1	1–2	1–1	1–2	0–1	4–0	0–0	2–2	0–2	2–1	0–1
1. FC Heidenheim	2–1	3–1	2–2	0–2	1–1	2–1	0–2	—	2–4	2–2	0–3	3–3	0–2	0–3	0–4	2–0	3–3	1–3
TSG Hoffenheim	3–0	3–1	1–0	2–1	1–3	3–0	4–1	3–1	—	0–1	3–1	1–0	1–2	5–1	1–4	0–1	3–3	1–1
1. FC Köln	1–1	0–1	3–1	1–2	3–4	4–1	4–1	1–3	2–2	—	1–2	1–2	2–1	3–3	1–3	1–1	1–2	1–0
RB Leipzig	2–1	3–1	2–0	2–2	6–0	2–0	2–1	2–0	5–0	3–1	—	1–3	1–2	1–0	1–5	2–1	3–1	2–2
Bayer Leverkusen	1–2	2–0	1–0	1–2	3–1	2–0	1–1	6–0	1–2	2–0	4–1	—	1–1	1–1	1–1	4–0	1–4	6–3
Mainz 05	2–0	1–3	1–1	0–2	2–1	0–1	1–1	2–1	1–1	0–1	0–1	3–4	—	0–1	3–4	0–0	2–2	3–1
Borussia Mönchengladbach	4–0	1–0	0–4	1–0	4–6	0–0	0–0	2–2	4–0	3–1	0–0	1–1	1–1	—	0–3	2–0	0–3	1–3
Bayern Munich	1–2	4–0	4–0	2–1	3–2	6–2	5–0	3–3	5–1	5–1	6–0	3–0	2–2	4–1	—	3–1	4–2	8–1
FC St. Pauli	2–1	0–1	2–1	3–3	0–0	1–2	0–0	2–1	0–3	1–1	1–1	1–2	1–2	0–4	0–5	—	2–1	1–3
VfB Stuttgart	3–2	1–1	1–1	0–2	3–2	1–0	4–0	1–0	0–0	3–1	1–0	3–1	2–1	1–0	0–5	2–0	—	4–0
VfL Wolfsburg	2–3	3–1	0–1	1–2	1–2	3–4	1–2	1–1	2–3	3–3	0–1	1–3	1–1	0–0	0–1	2–1	0–3	—

Source: Bundesliga
Legend: Blue = home team win; Yellow = draw; Red = away team win.

== Relegation play-offs ==
The relegation play-offs took place on 21 and 25 May 2026.

=== Overview ===
Team 1	Agg.	Team 2	1st leg	2nd leg
VfL Wolfsburg (B)	1–2	SC Paderborn (2B)	0–0	1–2 (a.e.t.)

=== Matches ===
21 May 2026
20:30

VfL Wolfsburg	0–0	SC Paderborn
	Report

Volkswagen Arena, Wolfsburg
Attendance: 27,800
Referee: Benjamin Brand
25 May 2026
20:30

SC Paderborn	2–1 (a.e.t.)	VfL Wolfsburg
Bilbija 38'; Curda 100'	Report	Pejčinović 3'

Home Deluxe Arena, Paderborn
Attendance: 15,000
Referee: Felix Zwayer

SC Paderborn won 2–1 on aggregate and were promoted to the Bundesliga, while VfL Wolfsburg were relegated to the 2. Bundesliga.

== Statistics ==
=== Top goalscorers ===
Rank	Player	Club	Goals
1	(England) Harry Kane	Bayern Munich	36
2	(Germany) Deniz Undav	VfB Stuttgart	19
3	(Guinea) Serhou Guirassy	Borussia Dortmund	17
4	(Czech Republic) Patrik Schick	Bayer Leverkusen	16
5	(Colombia) Luis Díaz	Bayern Munich	15
5	(France) Michael Olise	Bayern Munich	15
7	(Croatia) Andrej Kramarić	TSG Hoffenheim	14
8	(Austria) Christoph Baumgartner	RB Leipzig	13
8	(Germany) Jonathan Burkardt	Eintracht Frankfurt	13
8	(Germany) Said El Mala	1. FC Köln	13
8	(Bosnia and Herzegovina) Haris Tabaković	Borussia Mönchengladbach	13

=== Hat-tricks ===
Player	Club	Against	Result	Date
(England) Harry Kane	Bayern Munich	RB Leipzig	6–0 (H)	22 August 2025
(England) Harry Kane	Bayern Munich	TSG Hoffenheim	4–1 (A)	20 September 2025
(Scotland) Oliver Burke	Union Berlin	Eintracht Frankfurt	4–3 (A)	21 September 2025
(Germany) Deniz Undav	VfB Stuttgart	Borussia Dortmund	3–3 (A)	22 November 2025
(England) Harry Kane	Bayern Munich	VfB Stuttgart	5–0 (A)	6 December 2025
(Ivory Coast) Yan Diomande	RB Leipzig	Eintracht Frankfurt	6–0 (H)	6 December 2025
(Germany) Dženan Pejčinović	VfL Wolfsburg	SC Freiburg	3–4 (H)	20 December 2025
(Croatia) Andrej Kramarić	TSG Hoffenheim	Borussia Mönchengladbach	5–1 (H)	14 January 2026
(Colombia) Luis Díaz	Bayern Munich	TSG Hoffenheim	5–1 (H)	8 February 2026
(Czech Republic) Patrik Schick	Bayer Leverkusen	RB Leipzig	4–1 (H)	2 May 2026
(England) Harry Kane	Bayern Munich	1. FC Köln	5–1 (H)	16 May 2026

=== Clean sheets ===
Rank	Player	Club	Clean sheets
1	(Switzerland) Gregor Kobel	Borussia Dortmund	15
2	(Germany) Moritz Nicolas	Borussia Mönchengladbach	13
3	(Germany) Alexander Nübel	VfB Stuttgart	11
4	(Hungary) Péter Gulácsi	RB Leipzig	9
5	(Germany) Oliver Baumann	TSG Hoffenheim	7
6	(Germany) Noah Atubolu	SC Freiburg	6
6	(Portugal) Daniel Heuer Fernandes	Hamburger SV	6
6	(Germany) Manuel Neuer	Bayern Munich	6
9	(Germany) Mio Backhaus	SV Werder Bremen	5
9	(Germany) Finn Dahmen	FC Augsburg	5
9	(Netherlands) Mark Flekken	Bayer Leverkusen	5
9	(Denmark) Frederik Rønnow	Union Berlin	5
9	(Germany) Jonas Urbig	Bayern Munich	5
9	(Bosnia and Herzegovina) Nikola Vasilj	FC St. Pauli	5
9	(Germany) Michael Zetterer	Eintracht Frankfurt	5

== Awards ==
=== Monthly awards ===
Month	Player of the Month		Rookie of the Month		Goal of the Month		Ref.
Month	Player	Club	Player	Club	Player	Club	Ref.
August	—N/a		—N/a		(Colombia) Luis Díaz	Bayern Munich	
September	(England) Harry Kane	Bayern Munich	(Croatia) Luka Vušković	Hamburger SV	(Germany) Karim Adeyemi	Borussia Dortmund	
October	(Germany) Jonathan Burkardt	Eintracht Frankfurt	(Croatia) Luka Vušković	Hamburger SV	(Germany) Lennart Karl	Bayern Munich	
November	(France) Michael Olise	Bayern Munich	(Algeria) Ibrahim Maza	Bayer Leverkusen	(Colombia) Luis Díaz	Bayern Munich	
December	(England) Harry Kane	Bayern Munich	(Ivory Coast) Yan Diomande	RB Leipzig	(Croatia) Luka Vušković	Hamburger SV	
January	(France) Michael Olise	Bayern Munich	(Croatia) Luka Vušković	Hamburger SV	(France) Alexis Claude-Maurice	FC Augsburg	
February	(England) Harry Kane	Bayern Munich	(Ivory Coast) Yan Diomande	RB Leipzig	(Germany) Ragnar Ache	1. FC Köln	
March	(Germany) Deniz Undav	VfB Stuttgart	(Croatia) Luka Vušković	Hamburger SV	(Austria) Kevin Stöger	Borussia Mönchengladbach	
April	(Ivory Coast) Yan Diomande	RB Leipzig	(Algeria) Ibrahim Maza	Bayer Leverkusen	(France) Michael Olise	Bayern Munich	
May	—N/a		—N/a		(France) Michael Olise	Bayern Munich	

=== Annual awards ===
Award	Winner	Club	Ref.
Player of the Season	(France) Michael Olise	Bayern Munich	
Rookie of the Season	(Ivory Coast) Yan Diomande	RB Leipzig	
Goal of the Season	(Germany) Ragnar Ache	1. FC Köln	

=== Team of the Season ===
Presenters	Goalkeeper	Defenders	Midfielders	Forwards	Ref.
EA Sports (official)	(Switzerland) Gregor Kobel (Borussia Dortmund)	(Germany) Nico Schlotterbeck (Borussia Dortmund) (Germany) Jonathan Tah (Bayern Munich) (France) Dayot Upamecano (Bayern Munich) (Croatia) Luka Vušković (Hamburger SV)	(Germany) Joshua Kimmich (Bayern Munich) (Germany) Aleksandar Pavlović (Bayern Munich) (Germany) Angelo Stiller (VfB Stuttgart)	(Colombia) Luis Díaz (Bayern Munich) (England) Harry Kane (Bayern Munich) (France) Michael Olise (Bayern Munich)	
VDV	(Germany) Manuel Neuer (Bayern Munich)	(Germany) Nico Schlotterbeck (Borussia Dortmund) (France) Dayot Upamecano (Bayern Munich) (Germany) Jonathan Tah (Bayern Munich)	(Spain) Álex Grimaldo (Bayer Leverkusen) (Germany) Joshua Kimmich (Bayern Munich) (Austria) Konrad Laimer (Bayern Munich)	(Colombia) Luis Díaz (Bayern Munich) (Germany) Deniz Undav (VfB Stuttgart) (France) Michael Olise (Bayern Munich) (England) Harry Kane (Bayern Munich)	
kicker	(Switzerland) Gregor Kobel (Borussia Dortmund)	(Austria) Konrad Laimer (Bayern Munich) (Germany) Jonathan Tah (Bayern Munich) (Germany) Nico Schlotterbeck (Borussia Dortmund) (Czech Republic) Vladimír Coufal (TSG Hoffenheim)	(Germany) Joshua Kimmich (Bayern Munich) (Austria) Christoph Baumgartner (RB Leipzig) (France) Michael Olise (Bayern Munich)	(Colombia) Luis Díaz (Bayern Munich) (England) Harry Kane (Bayern Munich) (Germany) Deniz Undav (VfB Stuttgart)	
