= Jakub Zieliński =

Polish footballer

Personal information
- Full name: Jakub Zieliński
- Date of birth: 21 February 2008 (age 18)
- Place of birth: Gdańsk, Poland
- Height: 1.94 m (6 ft 4 in)
- Position: Goalkeeper

Team information
- Current team: VfL Wolfsburg
- Number: 30

Youth career
- –2022: Jaguar Gdańsk

Senior career*
Years	Team	Apps	(Gls)
2022–2023	Gedania Gdańsk	20	(0)
2023–2025	Legia Warsaw II	31	(0)
2025–	VfL Wolfsburg	7	(0)

International career^{‡}
2022–2023	Poland U15	5	(0)
2023–2024	Poland U16	4	(0)
2024–2025	Poland U17	9	(0)
2025	Poland U18	4	(0)
2026–	Poland U19	4	(0)
- * Club domestic league appearances and goals as of 13:49, 10 November 2026 (UTC) ‡ National team caps and goals as of 21:16, 19 November 2026 (UTC)

Jakub Zieliński (born 21 February 2008) is a Polish professional footballer who plays as a goalkeeper for 2. Bundesliga club VfL Wolfsburg.

== Club career ==
Born in Gdańsk, Zieliński joined the youth team of Polish club Legia Warsaw in 2023 and regularly featured for their reserve side. On 24 June 2025, he signed for German club VfL Wolfsburg on a contract till 2028.

On 8 August 2026, coach Tobias Strobl announced that he would start the first match of 2. Bundesliga campaign against 1. FC Kaiserslautern following an injury to the first choice Timon Wellenreuther and by-passing the experienced Austrian Pavao Pervan. Subsequently, he made his professional debut for Wolfsburg, starting in a 0–0 draw and making three saves. At 18 years, five months and 18 days, he became the youngest goalkeeper ever to play for VfL Wolfsburg.

== International career ==
Zieliński has been capped at the Poland youth levels.

== Career statistics ==
As of match played 10 October 2026

Appearances and goals by club, season and competition
Club	Season	League			National cup (Note: Includes Polish Cup, DFB-Pokal)		Other		Total	
Club	Season	Division	Apps	Goals	Apps	Goals	Apps	Goals	Apps	Goals
Gedania Gdańsk	2022–23	III liga, group II	20	0	—		—		20	0
Legia Warsaw II	2023–24	III liga, group I	13	0	2	0	—		15	0
Legia Warsaw II	2024–25	III liga, group I	17	0	—		1 (Note: Appearance in III liga promotion play-offs)	0	18	0
Legia Warsaw II	Total		30	0	2	0	1	0	33	0
VfL Wolfsburg	2025–26	Bundesliga	0	0	0	0	—		0	0
VfL Wolfsburg	2026–27	2. Bundesliga	7	0	1	0	—		8	0
VfL Wolfsburg	Total		7	0	1	0	—		8	0
Career total			57	0	3	0	1	0	61	0

== Honours ==
Legia Warsaw II

- Polish Cup (Masovia regionals): 2024–25
