= Aaron Zehnter =

German footballer

Personal information
- Date of birth: 31 October 2004 (age 22)
- Place of birth: Sonderhofen, Germany
- Height: 1.80 m (5 ft 11 in)
- Position: Left-back

Team information
- Current team: VfL Wolfsburg
- Number: 25

Youth career
- SV Sonderhofen
- 2016–2017: Würzburger FV
- 2017–2019: Würzburger Kickers
- 2019–2022: FC Augsburg

Senior career*
Years	Team	Apps	(Gls)
2022–2024	FC Augsburg II	31	(4)
2023–2024	FC Augsburg	1	(0)
2024–2025	SC Paderborn	47	(4)
2025–	VfL Wolfsburg	20	(2)

International career^{‡}
2021–2022	Germany U18	6	(0)
2022–2024	Germany U19	5	(0)
2024–2025	Germany U20	3	(0)
2025–	Germany U21	2	(0)
- * Club domestic league appearances and goals as of 25 April 2026 ‡ National team caps and goals as of 18:50, 19 November 2025 (UTC)

Aaron Zehnter (German pronunciation: [ˈaːʁɔn ˈtseːntɐ]; born 31 October 2004) is a German professional footballer who plays as a left-back for 2. Bundesliga club VfL Wolfsburg.

== Club career ==
Zehnter is a youth product of Würzburger FV, Würzburger Kickers, and FC Augsburg. On 8 May 2022, he signed his first professional contract with FC Augsburg until 2024 with an option to extend for two more seasons. He made He made his league debut with the FC Augsburg side in a 1–0 Bundesliga win over Bayer Leverkusen on 3 February 2023.

On 4 January 2024, Zehnter signed with SC Paderborn in 2. Bundesliga.

On 1 July 2025, Zehnter signed a five-year contract with Bundesliga club VfL Wolfsburg.

== International career ==
Zehnter is a youth international for Germany, having played up to the Germany U20s.

== Career statistics ==
As of match played 25 April 2026

Appearances and goals by club, season and competition
Club	Season	League			Cup		Europe		Other		Total	
Club	Season	Division	Apps	Goals	Apps	Goals	Apps	Goals	Apps	Goals	Apps	Goals
FC Augsburg II	2021–22	Regionalliga Bayern	3	0	—		—		—		3	0
FC Augsburg II	2022–23	Regionalliga Bayern	12	2	—		—		—		12	2
FC Augsburg II	2023–24	Regionalliga Bayern	16	2	—		—		—		16	2
FC Augsburg II	Total		31	4	—		—		—		31	4
FC Augsburg	2022–23	Bundesliga	1	0	1	0	—		—		2	0
SC Paderborn	2023–24	2. Bundesliga	15	1	—		—		—		15	1
SC Paderborn	2024–25	2. Bundesliga	32	3	1	0	—		—		33	3
SC Paderborn	Total		47	4	1	0	—		—		48	4
VfL Wolfsburg	2025–26	Bundesliga	20	2	1	0	—		—		21	2
Career total			99	8	3	0	0	0	0	0	102	8
