= Daniel Bauer (footballer) =

German footballer and manager (born 1982)

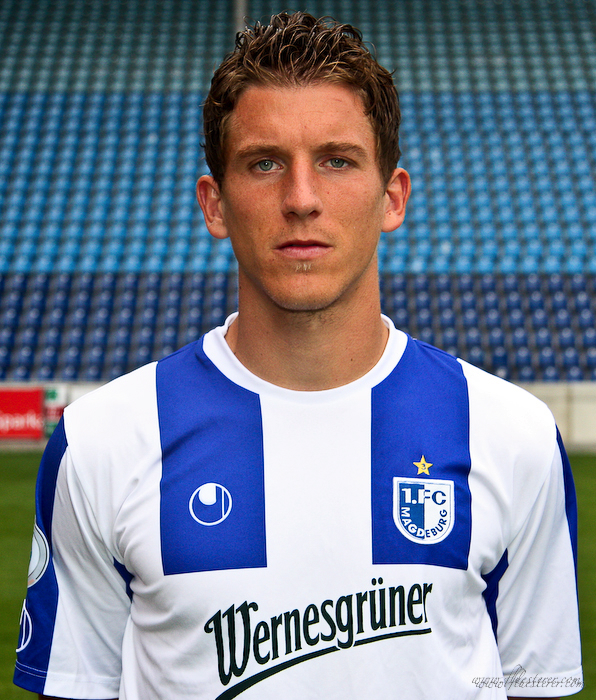
- Bauer in 1. FC Magdeburg's colors in 2010

Personal information
- Date of birth: 17 October 1982 (age 44)
- Place of birth: Andernach, West Germany
- Height: 1.84 m (6 ft 0 in)
- Position: Midfielder

Youth career
- SC Concordia Saffig
- TuS Mayen

Senior career*
| Years | Team | Apps | (Gls) |
| 2001–2002 | TuS Mayen | 30 | (15) |
| 2002–2006 | Eintracht Trier | 36 | (0) |
| 2007 | Union Berlin | 10 | (0) |
| 2008 | RoPS | 9 | (0) |
| 2009–2011 | 1. FC Magdeburg | 63 | (5) |
| 2012 | Eintracht Trier | 13 | (0) |
| 2012–2013 | VfB Oldenburg | 16 | (2) |
| 2013–2014 | Hannover 96 II | 21 | (0) |
| Total | | 198 | (22) |

Managerial career
- 2025: VfL Wolfsburg (caretaker)
- 2025–2026: VfL Wolfsburg
- * Club domestic league appearances and goals

Daniel Bauer (born 17 October 1982) is a German professional football manager and former player.

A midfielder during his playing career, he made 26 2. Bundesliga appearances for Eintracht Trier before recurring injuries reduced him to the lower tiers of the German football pyramid for the remainder of his playing career. He retired in 2014 and spent a decade coaching youth sides at VfL Wolfsburg before serving as the club's head coach from November 2025 until March 2026.

== Playing career ==
=== TuS Mayen and Eintracht Trier ===
Bauer grew up in Andernach and began playing football at local club SC Concordia Saffig before progressing to TuS Mayen, where he featured for both the youth and senior sides. In the Verbandsliga Rheinland, then the fifth tier of German football, he won promotion to the Oberliga Südwest in his first senior season; the club finished twelfth the following year before Bauer moved on.

In 2002, described at the time as a goal-threatening talent, Bauer joined Eintracht Trier—who were entering their first 2. Bundesliga season under coach Paul Linz—and established himself as a defensive midfielder. He made 26 second-division appearances across three seasons, during which Trier were relegated on the final day of the 2004–05 season on goal difference. Bauer remained at the club for the following Regionalliga Süd campaign, adding ten appearances, but a managerial change midway through the season left him on the margins and eventually playing for the reserve side; he departed in the summer of 2006.

=== Union Berlin and RoPS ===
Without a club, Bauer sustained a serious ankle injury—tearing three ligaments—on the final day of a trial at Union Berlin, leaving him unemployed for several months. He eventually signed for Union Berlin the following January and made ten Regionalliga Nord appearances before the season ended, though the two parties could not agree terms on a new contract.

After a further period without a club, Bauer signed for Finnish top-flight side RoPS and made nine Veikkausliiga appearances before fracturing his shoulder blade in June, ruling him out for the remainder of the season. Finnish sports magazine Urheilulehti nonetheless ranked him the eighth-best foreign player in the division that year, but his contract was not renewed at the end of the season.

=== 1. FC Magdeburg ===
On 2 February 2009, Bauer signed a contract with Regionalliga Nord side 1. FC Magdeburg until June 2010. A serious injury limited him to 16 appearances in his first full season, but he extended his contract in May 2010 until June 2011 and was made captain for the 2010–11 season.

With the club struggling at the bottom of the Regionalliga in the 2011–12 season, Bauer had already reported written death threats to police two months before he was attacked, but said he was sent away without action being taken. On the night of 27 October 2011, several masked men wearing club colours entered his apartment building and threatened him verbally, demanding that the side win an upcoming derby against Hallescher FC or face a return visit. Bauer later recalled that "six or seven men, all wearing Magdeburg balaclavas" had stood at his door: "A complete moment of shock." The club filed a criminal complaint, stripped Bauer of the captaincy, and listed him as absent from the derby "for personal reasons" without consulting him. Bauer fled to his hometown near Koblenz and, after club president Peter Fechner publicly dismissed concerns about the incident, requested that his contract be dissolved by mutual consent. Charges were subsequently brought against one identified individual; investigators were unable to identify the remaining perpetrators. He made 64 appearances in total for the club, scoring five goals.

=== Later career ===
Bauer rejoined Eintracht Trier in January 2012, returning to the club where he had spent the first four years of his senior career. Now competing in the Regionalliga Südwest, the fourth tier, he saw out the season before moving on that summer.

Bauer signed with VfB Oldenburg in summer 2012, who had just won promotion to the Regionalliga Nord after a twelve-year absence from the fourth tier, joining alongside his brother Tobias Bauer. Bauer cited the club's persistent interest and signed a two-year contract with an option for a third season, also expressing his intention to begin coaching qualifications during the spell. The arrangement collapsed in January 2013 when sporting director Frank Neubarth announced that both Bauer brothers had been dropped from the squad, stating the club "had no other choice"; Daniel Bauer maintained the pair "had always conducted themselves impeccably".

Bauer joined the reserve side of Hannover 96 for the remainder of the season and retired from playing at the end of 2013–14, aged 31.

== Managerial career ==
=== Hannover 96 ===
Bauer moved directly into coaching upon retiring from playing in the summer of 2014, taking up an assistant coaching role with the reserve side of Hannover 96—the club where he had ended his playing career. He described the two seasons there as his "first steps as a coach".

=== VfL Wolfsburg ===
==== Academy (2016–2025) ====
In 2016, Bauer joined the academy of VfL Wolfsburg after being contacted by two figures he knew well: Fabian Wohlgemuth, the academy's director, and Thomas Reis, who had just been appointed as head coach of the club's under-19 side and with whom Bauer had played at Eintracht Trier more than a decade earlier. Over the following nine years, he held a succession of roles within the academy: assistant coach of the under-19s, assistant coach of the reserve side, head coach of the under-17s from 2020, and head coach of the under-19s from January 2022.

Among the highlights of his academy tenure, Bauer won the youth league title in his first season with the under-19s and led the reserve side to the Regionalliga title. The most painful episode of his time at the club was the 2018–19 3. Liga promotion play-off against Bayern Munich II, in which Wolfsburg's reserves won the first leg 3–1 only to lose the return 4–1 and miss out on promotion: "That defeat left a scar that will never fully heal." Players he developed during this period included Omar Marmoush and Anton Stach, both of whom went on to represent the Germany national team.

==== Head coach (2025–2026) ====
When Ralph Hasenhüttl was dismissed as Bundesliga head coach in May 2025, Bauer stepped up from the academy on a caretaker basis for the final two matches of the season, earning four points. He returned to his under-19 role for the start of the 2025–26 season, but was called upon again in November 2025 following the dismissal of Paul Simonis. He steadied the side, collecting seven points from his first four matches in charge, and on 20 December 2025 was appointed permanently on a contract to June 2027. Managing director Peter Christiansen said that Bauer had "not only managed to bring stability, he's developed the side week by week".

Results deteriorated sharply in the new year. An 8–1 defeat at Bayern Munich on 11 January 2026 marked the start of a run of eight consecutive matches without a win, and the club slipped to 17th place, two points from the relegation play-off position. Following a 2–1 home defeat to Hamburger SV on 7 March, Wolfsburg relieved Bauer of his duties the following morning. Sporting director Pirmin Schwegler described the decision as "anything but easy", but said the club had concluded it needed "a new impulse in order to secure Bundesliga survival". Bauer had accumulated 12 points from 15 matches during his second spell in charge.
