= Daniel von der Bracke =

German footballer (born 1992)

Personal information
- Date of birth: 28 January 1992 (age 34)
- Place of birth: Aachen, Germany
- Height: 1.84 m (6 ft 0 in)
- Position: Centre-back

Team information
- Current team: TuS Koblenz
- Number: 4

Youth career
- –2002: Adler Büsbach
- 2002–2010: Bayer Leverkusen

Senior career*
Years	Team	Apps	(Gls)
2010–2011	Bayer Leverkusen II	2	(0)
2011–2013	VfL Osnabrück II	36	(7)
2011–2013	VfL Osnabrück	5	(0)
2013–2014	TSV Havelse	29	(0)
2014–2015	Goslarer SC	25	(0)
2015–	TuS Koblenz	280	(3)

International career
2009	Germany U17	1	(0)
- * Club domestic league appearances and goals as of 30 June 2026

Daniel von der Bracke (born 28 January 1992) is a German footballer who plays as a centre-back for Oberliga Rheinland-Pfalz/Saar club TuS Koblenz.

== Career ==
Von der Bracke began his career with Bayer Leverkusen, and made a couple of appearances for the reserve team in the 2010–11 season. In July 2011 he signed for VfL Osnabrück of the 3. Liga, and made his debut at this level in February 2012, as a substitute for Rouwen Hennings in a 2–0 win over 1. FC Saarbrücken. In July 2013 he signed for TSV Havelse.

Von der Bracke joined Goslarer Goslarer SC in July 2014. The following year, he joined TuS Koblenz.
