= Maximilian Arnold =

German footballer (born 1994)

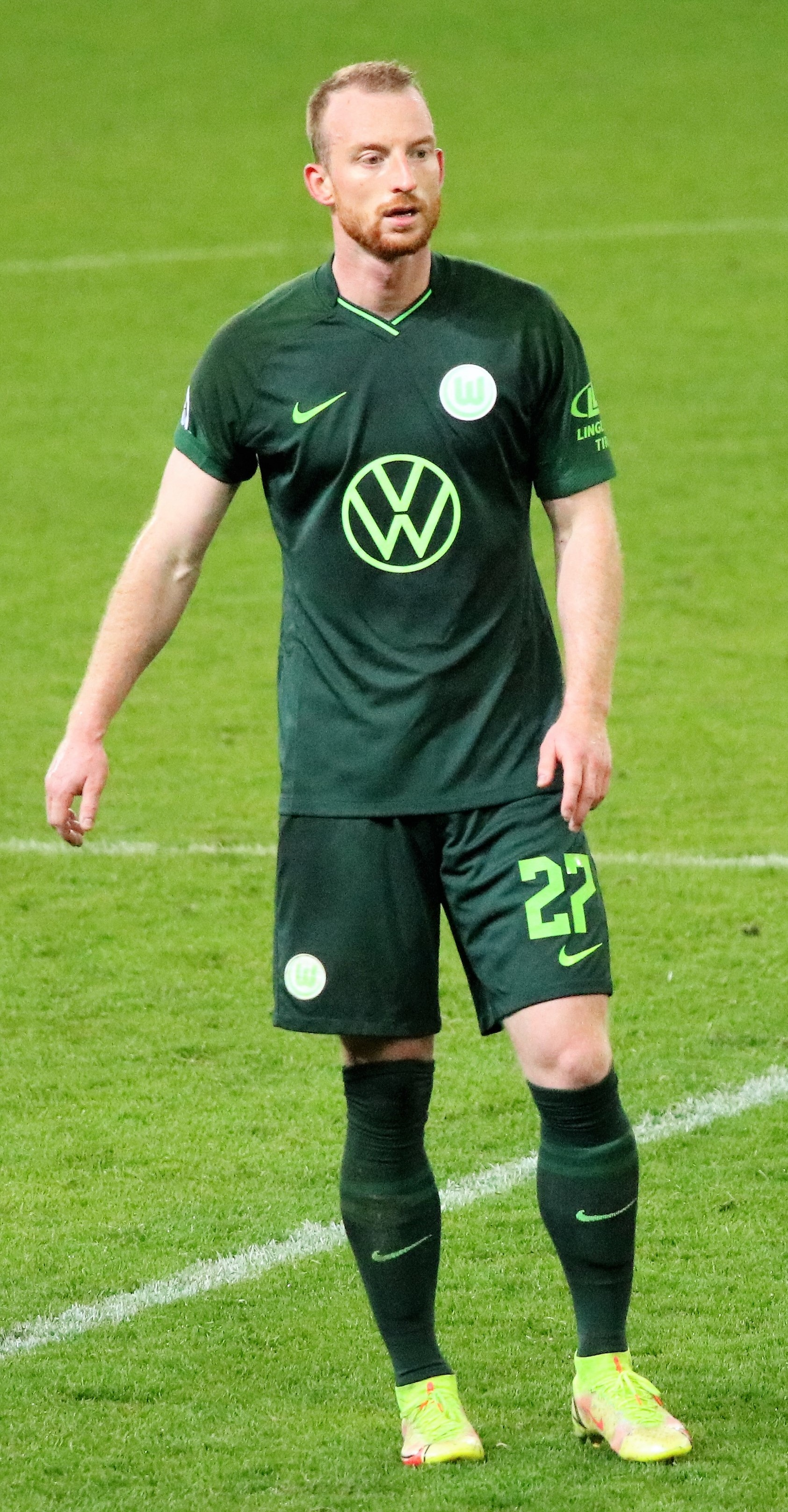
- Arnold with VfL Wolfsburg in 2021

Personal information
- Full name: Maximilian Arnold
- Date of birth: 27 May 1994 (age 32)
- Place of birth: Riesa, Germany
- Height: 1.84 m (6 ft 0 in)
- Position: Defensive midfielder

Team information
- Current team: VfL Wolfsburg
- Number: 27

Youth career
- 2003–2006: SC Riesa
- 2006–2009: Dynamo Dresden
- 2009–2011: VfL Wolfsburg

Senior career*
Years	Team	Apps	(Gls)
2011–	VfL Wolfsburg	405	(45)
2013	VfL Wolfsburg II	2	(0)

International career^{‡}
2009–2010	Germany U16	2	(0)
2010–2011	Germany U17	10	(1)
2011–2012	Germany U18	8	(2)
2012	Germany U19	2	(0)
2013	Germany U20	6	(1)
2013–2017	Germany U21	23	(5)
2021	Germany Olympic	2	(0)
2014–2021	Germany	3	(0)
Medal record
UEFA European Under-21 Championship
Winner	2017
- * Club domestic league appearances and goals as of 20:30, 18 September 2026 (UTC) ‡ National team caps and goals as of 18:53, 14 November 2021 (UTC)

Maximilian Arnold (born 27 May 1994) is a German professional footballer who plays as a defensive midfielder for 2. Bundesliga club VfL Wolfsburg, which he captains. An academy graduate of Wolfsburg, Arnold became the club's youngest ever debutant in 2011 and has since made 400 league appearances for the club.

== Club career ==
=== VfL Wolfsburg ===
==== Youth and early Wolfsburg career ====
Born in Riesa, Germany, Arnold represented local sides BSV Strehla and SC Riesa during his formative years. In 2006, at the age of 12, he left Riesa to join the academy of Dynamo Dresden where he spent the next four years before signing for VfL Wolfsburg. During his time with Wolfsburg's youth sides he helped the club to two German U-19 championships; in 2009 and 2011.

Arnold was handed his first-team debut by Felix Magath on 26 November 2011 when he came on as a late substitute in a 2–0 loss against FC Augsburg. Upon appearing, Arnold became the club's youngest ever debutant at the age of 17 years, five months and 30 days. However, he spent the majority of the season with the U-19 team and made only one further senior appearance for the remainder of the campaign.

After continuing to impress at youth level, Arnold returned to the first team in 2013 under new manager Dieter Hecking. On 13 April, he scored his first professional goal in a 2–2 home draw against 1899 Hoffenheim. By doing so, Arnold also became the club's youngest ever goalscorer. He scored again the following week in a 3–0 victory against Werder Bremen, which helped end a streak of five matches without a victory for Wolfsburg. Following a run of two goals in six matches, Arnold signed an extended four-year contract with the club.

==== First team breakthrough and Cup success ====
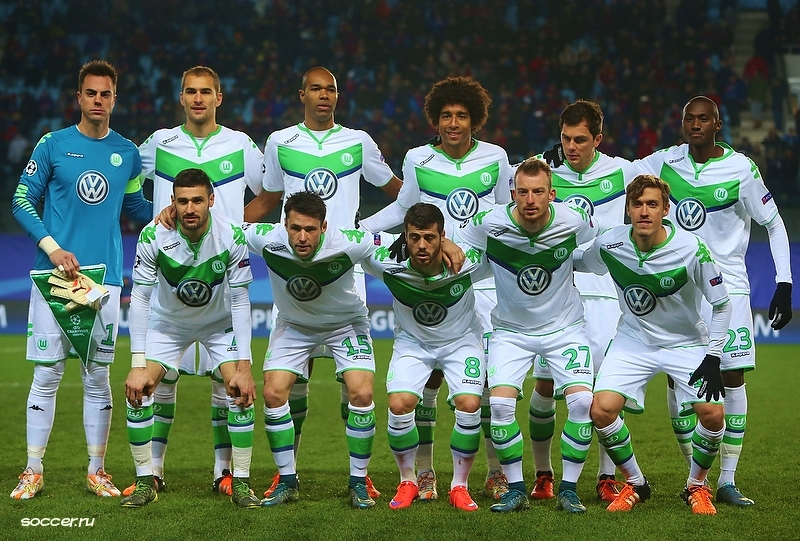
Arnold (bottom row, second from right) prior to Wolfsburg's Champions League match against CSKA Moscow in 2015

The following season, Arnold started in the opening match against Hannover but was sent off after just thirty minutes. He subsequently lost his place in his club and had to wait months before returning. However, upon his return, Arnold scored four goals in five matches to help the club qualify for the following season's Europa League. Arnold's form throughout the season caught the attention of German national team coach Joachim Löw who eventually handed him his first senior call-up. He carried his form into the 2014–15 season where Wolfsburg ended as runners-up to Bayern Munich and won the DFB Pokal after beating Borussia Dortmund 3–1.

By virtue of the club's league position the season before and success in the DFB-Pokal, Wolfsburg took part in the 2015 DFL-Supercup and 2015–16 UEFA Champions League campaigns. On 1 August 2015, Arnold started and played the whole match as Wolfsburg beat Bayern Munich on penalties to claim the Supercup title. He then made his Champions League debut on 15 September 2015, coming as a substitute for André Schürrle in a 1–0 win over CSKA Moscow. He scored his first goal in the competition in April the following year, netting Wolfsburg's second in a 2–0 home victory against Real Madrid in the quarter-finals. However, Wolfsburg failed to progress, as a hat-trick from Madrid's Cristiano Ronaldo in the second leg saw the club eliminated from the competition. Arnold eventually scored four goals in 43 appearances across all competitions as Wolfsburg ended the league season in eighth position.

Wolfsburg struggled during the course of the next two seasons. During the 2016–17 campaign, Arnold scored twice, including one against Hoffenheim in the first match of the Rückrunde as Wolfsburg almost avoided relegation. Wolfsburg ultimately had to defeat Eintracht Braunschweig in the relegation play-off to maintain their spot in the German top-flight. The club again fought relegation the following season and towards the end of the campaign, Arnold and teammates Max Grün and Paul Verhaegh had to try and appease the club's disgruntled supporters following a 3–1 defeat against fellow relegation-threatening opponent, Hamburg. Despite the club's weakness, Arnold had enjoyed some personal success earlier in the season. On 3 January 2018, he signed a new five-year contract with Wolfsburg and later that month scored a contender for goal of the season with a long-range free-kick in a 3–1 loss against Eintracht Frankfurt.

On 23 November 2019, Arnold made his 200th Bundesliga appearance for Wolfsburg and marked the occasion with an assist for Wout Weghorst's goal in the club's 2–0 victory against Eintracht Frankfurt. On 12 February 2021, Arnold signed a contract extension with Wolfsburg until 2026. Later that year, on 23 October, he made his 260th Bundesliga appearance in a 2–0 home defeat to SC Freiburg, surpassing former goalkeeper Diego Benaglio as Wolfsburg's all-time Bundesliga appearance leader, and also his overall club appearance record in all competitions. In July 2022, he was named the club's new captain by head coach Niko Kovač. On 18 April 2026, Arnold made his 400th Bundesliga appearance for Wolfsburg in a 2–1 away victory over Union Berlin.

== International career ==
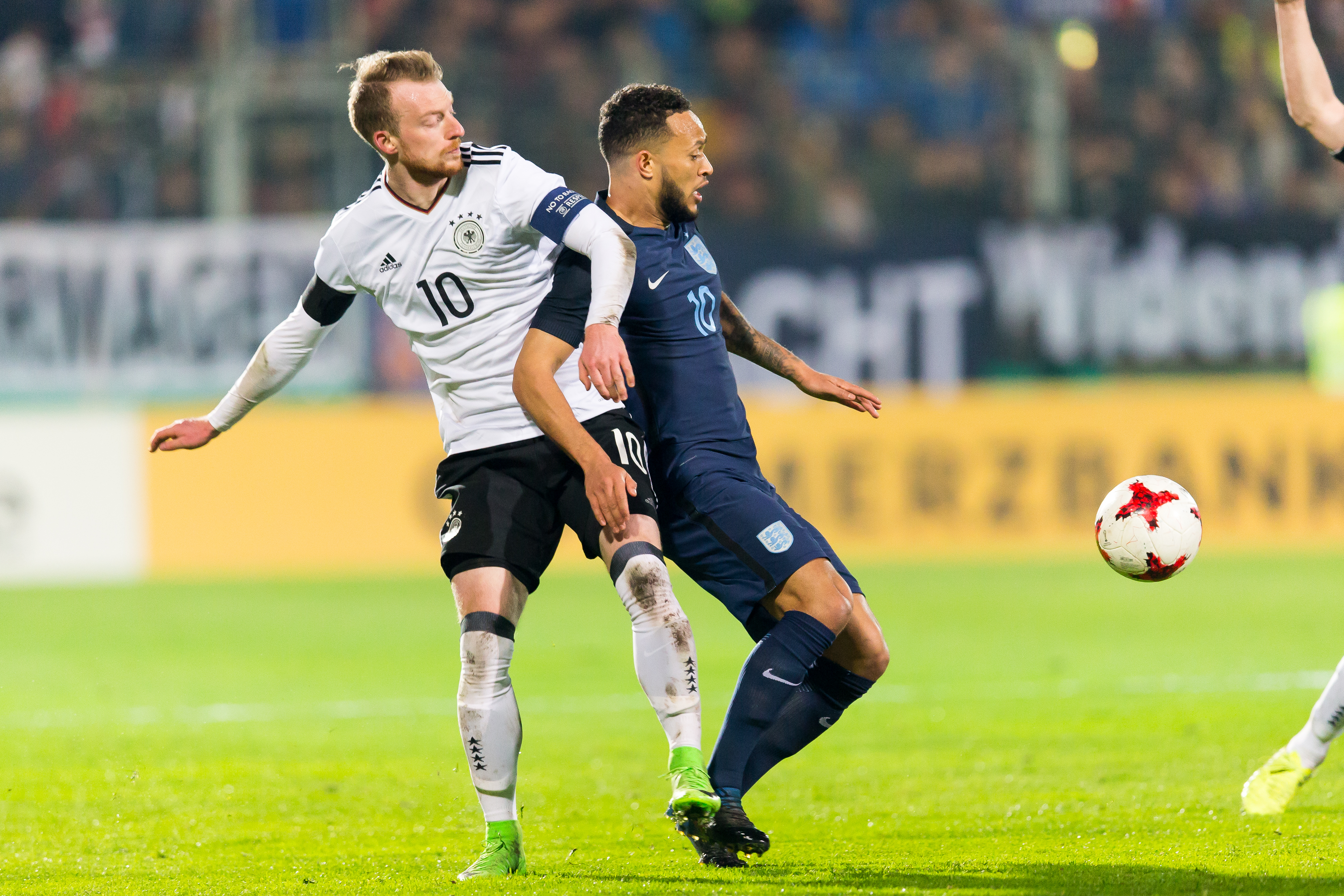
Arnold captaining the German U-21 side at the 2017 UEFA European Under-21 Championship

=== Youth ===
Between 2009 and 2017, Arnold represented Germany at every youth level. In 2017, he served as captain the U-21 team to the title at the 2017 UEFA European Under-21 Championship in Poland. Arnold recorded two assists and scored his spot-kick in a penalty shoot-out victory against England in the semi-finals, as Germany went on to claim their second title with another victory, this time against Spain. His performances throughout the tournament ultimately earned him a spot in the team of the tournament.

Arnold was named as one of the three permitted overage players in Germany's squad for the 2020 Olympics in Tokyo, eventually being selected as captain. Arnold would be sent off in the opening match of the tournament, a 4-2 defeat against Brazil.

=== Senior ===
On 13 May 2014, Arnold made his debut against Poland, but played only the last 14 minutes after replacing Max Meyer.

== Career statistics ==
=== Club ===
As of match played 18 September 2026

Appearances and goals by club, season and competition
Club	Season	League			DFB-Pokal		Europe		Other		Total	
Club	Season	Division	Apps	Goals	Apps	Goals	Apps	Goals	Apps	Goals	Apps	Goals
VfL Wolfsburg	2011–12	Bundesliga	2	0	0	0	—		—		2	0
VfL Wolfsburg	2012–13	Bundesliga	6	3	1	0	—		—		7	3
VfL Wolfsburg	2013–14	Bundesliga	28	7	3	0	—		—		31	7
VfL Wolfsburg	2014–15	Bundesliga	27	4	5	2	8 (Note: Appearances in UEFA Europa League)	0	—		40	6
VfL Wolfsburg	2015–16	Bundesliga	31	3	2	0	10 (Note: Appearances in UEFA Champions League)	1	1 (Note: Appearance in DFL-Supercup)	0	44	4
VfL Wolfsburg	2016–17	Bundesliga	32	2	2	0	—		2 (Note: Appearances in Bundesliga relegation play-offs)	0	36	2
VfL Wolfsburg	2017–18	Bundesliga	29	2	3	0	—		2	0	34	2
VfL Wolfsburg	2018–19	Bundesliga	33	2	3	0	—		—		36	2
VfL Wolfsburg	2019–20	Bundesliga	33	4	2	0	9	1	—		44	5
VfL Wolfsburg	2020–21	Bundesliga	30	3	3	0	3	0	—		36	3
VfL Wolfsburg	2021–22	Bundesliga	34	4	1	0	6	0	—		41	4
VfL Wolfsburg	2022–23	Bundesliga	32	5	2	0	—		—		34	5
VfL Wolfsburg	2023–24	Bundesliga	30	2	3	0	—		—		33	2
VfL Wolfsburg	2024–25	Bundesliga	28	3	2	0	—		—		30	3
VfL Wolfsburg	2025–26	Bundesliga	25	1	2	0	—		0	0	27	1
VfL Wolfsburg	2026–27	2. Bundesliga	5	0	1	2	—		—		6	2
VfL Wolfsburg	Total		405	45	35	4	36	2	5	0	481	51
VfL Wolfsburg II	2013–14	Regionalliga Nord	2	0	—		—		—		2	0
Career total			407	45	35	4	36	2	5	0	483	51

=== International ===
Appearances and goals by national team and year
National team	Year	Apps	Goals
Germany	2014	1	0
Germany	2021	2	0
Total		3	0

== Honours ==
VfL Wolfsburg

- DFB-Pokal: 2014–15
- DFL-Supercup: 2015

Germany U21

- UEFA European Under-21 Championship: 2017

Individual

- UEFA European Under-21 Championship Team of the Tournament: 2017
