= Mathys Angély =

French footballer (born 2007)

Personal information
- Date of birth: 21 April 2007 (age 19)
- Place of birth: Brive-la-Gaillarde, France
- Height: 1.90 m (6 ft 3 in)
- Position: Centre-back

Team information
- Current team: VfL Wolfsburg
- Number: 22

Youth career
- 2012–2022: ESA Brive
- 2020–2022: Pôle Espoir de Talence
- 2022–2023: Bordeaux

Senior career*
Years	Team	Apps	(Gls)
2023–2024	Bordeaux II	8	(1)
2023–2024	Bordeaux	5	(0)
2024–	VfL Wolfsburg	3	(0)
2026	→ Anderlecht (loan)	4	(0)
2026	→ RSCA Futures (loan)	4	(1)

International career^{‡}
2022–2023	France U16	6	(0)
2023–2024	France U17	9	(0)
2024	France U18	5	(0)
2025–	France U19	3	(0)
- * Club domestic league appearances and goals as of 5 September 2026 ‡ National team caps and goals as of 31 March 2026

Mathys Angély (born 21 April 2007) is a French footballer who plays as a centre-back for German 2. Bundesliga club VfL Wolfsburg.

== Early career ==
Angély was born in Brive-la-Gaillarde, and is of Martiniquais and Malagasy descent. He spent most of youth career playing for local team ESA Brive. In 2020, he joined the best regional academy of talents « Pole espoir de Talence » during 2 years, and in 2022, he joined the youth side of Bordeaux.

== Club career ==
Angély was promoted to Bordeaux's second team in December 2023, making his senior debut against Colomiers. On 6 April 2024, at 16 years old, 11 months and 15 days, Angely made his professional debut as substitute for Bordeaux in a 1–0 Ligue 2 victory against Caen. He signed his first professional contract with Bordeaux at the end of the season.

Due to his current club Bordeaux entering into administration as a result of financial difficulties, Angely officially became a free agent. On 13th August 2024 Angely joined Bundesliga club VfL Wolfsburg on a long-term contract.

On 3 February 2026, Angély joined Anderlecht on loan for the remainder of the season, with the Belgian club holding an option to make the transfer permanent.

== International career ==
Angély represented France at youth level, selected with France U16 and France U17. In May 2024, he was named in France U17's 20-men squad for the Euro U17.

== Career statistics ==
As of match played 5 September 2026

Appearances and goals by club, season and competition
Club	Season	League			Cup		Europe		Other		Total	
Club	Season	Division	Apps	Goals	Apps	Goals	Apps	Goals	Apps	Goals	Apps	Goals
Bordeaux II	2023–24	National 3	8	1	—		—		—		8	1
Bordeaux	2023–24	Ligue 2	5	0	—		—		—		5	0
VfL Wolfsburg	2025–26	Bundesliga	0	0	0	0	—		—		0	0
VfL Wolfsburg	2026–27	2. Bundesliga	3	0	0	0	—		—		3	0
VfL Wolfsburg	Total		3	0	0	0	—		—		3	0
Anderlecht (loan)	2025–26	Belgian Pro League	4	0	—		—		—		4	0
RSCA Futures (loan)	2025–26	Challenger Pro League	4	1	—		—		—		4	1
Career total			24	2	0	0	0	0	0	0	24	2
