= Raisin Bank =

German Credit institution

Coordinates: 50.114915°N 8.649043°E

Raisin Bank AG
- former logo of MHB Bank
- Founded: 1973
- Headquarters: Frankfurt am Main, Berlin (Raisin SE), Germany
- Website: www.raisin.bank

Raisin Bank AG, (formerly Mitteleuropäische Handelsbank AG Deutsch-Polnische Bank (MHB)) is a German Credit institution headquartered in Frankfurt am Main. The fully licensed company specializes in corporate clients and acts as a cooperation partner for third-party companies. The bank is part of Raisin SE, based in Berlin.

== History ==
=== Founded in 1973 ===
Raisin Bank was founded in 1973 in Frankfurt, under the name "Mitteleuropäische Handelsbank AG Deutsch-Polnische Bank" by Hessische Landesbank and the Polish Bank Handlowy. The credit institution primarily operates as a service provider in the business-to-business sector. In 2005, the bank became been a subsidiary of the US investment company Lone Star Funds.

=== Raisin SE 2019 ===
In March 2019, it was announced that Raisin SE, based in Berlin (owner of the "Raisin" brand), had acquired the bank. In August 2019, the bank was renamed to Raisin Bank. In June 2022, Raisin Bank expanded its business to include payment services (electronic payments and cash solutions) by acquiring the Payment Services division of Bankhaus August Lenz & Co. Raisin offers credit services to businesses in Ireland.
