= Kofi Amoako (footballer) =

German footballer (born 2005)

Personal information
- Full name: Kofi Jeremy Amoako
- Date of birth: 6 May 2005 (age 21)
- Place of birth: Germany
- Height: 1.86 m (6 ft 1 in)
- Position: Defensive midfielder

Team information
- Current team: Hamburger SV
- Number: 22

Youth career
- 2015–2016: Fortuna Sachsenross
- 2016–2019: Hannover 96
- 2019–2023: VfL Wolfsburg

Senior career*
Years	Team	Apps	(Gls)
2023–2025	VfL Wolfsburg	2	(0)
2024–2025	→ VfL Osnabrück (loan)	33	(0)
2025–2026	Dynamo Dresden	32	(0)
2026–	Hamburger SV	3	(0)

International career^{‡}
2021	Germany U17	1	(0)
2022–2023	Germany U18	3	(0)
2023–2024	Germany U19	7	(0)
2025–	Germany U20	6	(0)
2026–	Germany U21	1	(0)
- * Club domestic league appearances and goals as of 1 November 2026 ‡ National team caps and goals as of 17 November 2026

Kofi Jeremy Amoako (born 6 May 2005) is a German professional footballer who plays as a defensive midfielder for Bundesliga club Hamburger SV.

== Club career ==
Amoako is a youth product of Fortuna Sachsenross, Hannover 96 and VfL Wolfsburg. At VfL Wolsburg, he worked his way up their youth categories and eventually captained their U19 squad. On 9 February 2023, he signed a professional contract with the club. He made his professional debut with Wolfsburg as a late substitute in a 1–0 Bundesliga win over Darmstadt 98 on 16 December 2023.

On 12 August 2024, Amoako joined VfL Osnabrück in 3. Liga on loan.

On 26 June 2025, Amoako signed with Dynamo Dresden, recently promoted to 2. Bundesliga.

On 23 May 2026, Amoako signed with Bundesliga club Hamburger SV.

== International career ==
Born in Germany, Amoako is of Ghanaian descent. He is a youth international for Germany, having played for the Germany U19s in 2023.

Amoako was one of the players who were called up with the Germany U21 national team by head coach Antonio Di Salvo for the friendly match against Croatia U21 on 18 November 2026.

== Career statistics ==
As of match played 1 November 2026

Appearances and goals by club, season and competition
Club	Season	League			Cup		Other		Total	
Club	Season	Division	Apps	Goals	Apps	Goals	Apps	Goals	Apps	Goals
VfL Wolfsburg	2023–24	Bundesliga	2	0	—		—		2	0
VfL Osnabrück (loan)	2024–25	3. Liga	33	0	1	0	2 (Note: Appearances in Lower Saxony Cup)	0	36	0
Dynamo Dresden	2025–26	2. Bundesliga	32	1	1	0	—		33	1
Hamburger SV	2026–27	Bundesliga	3	0	1	0	—		4	0
Career total			70	1	3	0	2	0	75	1
