= Paul Simonis =

Dutch football manager (born 1985)

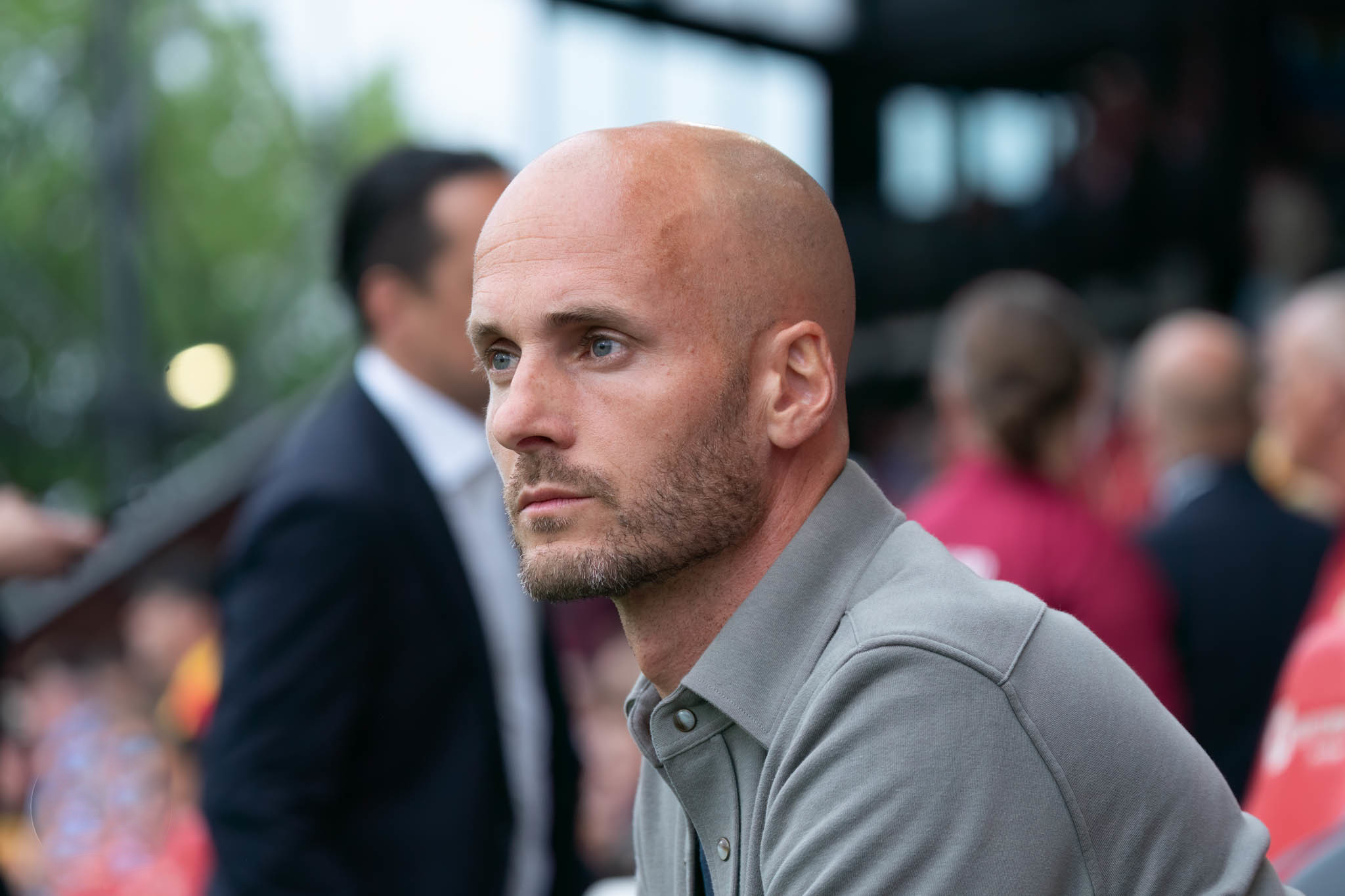
- Simonis in 2024 with Go Ahead Eagles

Personal information
- Date of birth: 14 February 1985 (age 41)
- Place of birth: Leidschendam-Voorburg, Netherlands

Managerial career
- Years: Team
- 2024–2025: Go Ahead Eagles
- 2025: VfL Wolfsburg

Paul Simonis (born 14 February 1985) is a Dutch football manager who was most recently the head coach of VfL Wolfsburg.

Simonis had his first managerial role in charge of Go Ahead Eagles in 2024, and won the KNVB Cup in his first season. He was subsequently appointed manager of VfL Wolfsburg in June 2025.

== Managerial career ==
=== Go Ahead Eagles ===
Before becoming head coach of Go Ahead Eagles in 2024, Paul Simonis spent 15 years (2005–2020) as a youth coach at Sparta Rotterdam, followed by assistant coaching roles at Go Ahead Eagles (2020–2022) and Heerenveen (2022–2024) under Kees van Wonderen.

Paul Simonis was appointed head coach of Go Ahead Eagles ahead of the 2024–25 season, following the departure of René Hake.

In his first year as head coach, Paul Simonis led Go Ahead Eagles to victory in the 2024–25 KNVB Cup, defeating AZ in the final after a penalty shootout. The team finished seventh in the Eredivisie.

=== VfL Wolfsburg ===
Simonis was appointed head coach of Wolfsburg on 12 June 2025 on a two-year contract, succeeding Ralph Hasenhüttl, who had been dismissed in early May. He arrived having just led Go Ahead Eagles to their first major trophy in over 90 years, winning the KNVB Cup in his debut season as head coach by defeating AZ 4–2 on penalties in the final, while also guiding the Deventer side to seventh place in the Eredivisie—their highest finish since 1970–71. Managing director Peter Christiansen said that Simonis "fits our requirement profile perfectly", sharing "the same ideas and concepts in terms of content and structure for how we want to present ourselves on the pitch and realign VfL Wolfsburg with fresh impetus".

Simonis won his first two competitive matches in charge, but form deteriorated rapidly thereafter. A home defeat to second-division Holstein Kiel in the second round of the DFB-Pokal compounded a poor start in the Bundesliga, and the side won just once in their next ten matches across all competitions. Six defeats in seven Bundesliga games left the club two points outside the relegation zone after ten rounds. The final straw came on 7 November, when Wolfsburg led at Werder Bremen until the 83rd minute only for the hosts to score twice late and win 2–1. Simonis was dismissed on 9 November 2025. Christiansen described the decision as "personally painful", saying the club had "greatly valued his work, his ideas, and his approach to the team".

== Managerial statistics ==
As of match played 7 November 2025

Managerial record by team and tenure
| Team | From | To | Record | | | | | | | | Ref. |
| Team | From | To | G | W | D | L | GF | GA | GD | Win % | Ref. |
|---|---|---|---|---|---|---|---|---|---|---|---|
| Go Ahead Eagles | 7 July 2024 | 12 June 2025 | 41 | 17 | 12 | 12 | 68 | 62 | +6 | 41.46 | |
| VfL Wolfsburg | 12 June 2025 | 9 November 2025 | 12 | 3 | 2 | 7 | 21 | 19 | +2 | 25.00 | |
| Total | | | 53 | 20 | 14 | 19 | 89 | 81 | +8 | 37.74 | |

== Honours ==
Go Ahead Eagles

- KNVB Cup: 2024–25
