= VfL Wolfsburg =

Association football club in Germany

- Full name: Verein für Leibesübungen Wolfsburg e. V. (Sports club); Verein für Leibesübungen Wolfsburg Fußball GmbH (Professional football club)
- Nicknames: Die Wölfe (The Wolves); Die Weißgrünen (The White and Greens)
- Founded: 12 September 1945; 81 years ago
- Stadium: Volkswagen Arena
- Capacity: 30,000
- Owner: Volkswagen Group (of GmbH)
- Management board: Dieter Hecking (Managing director sport); Jens Klingfurt (Managing director for Finance)
- Head coach: Tobias Strobl
- League: 2. Bundesliga
- 2025–26: Bundesliga, 16th of 18 (relegated via play-off)
- Website: vfl-wolfsburg.de
Home colours	Away colours	Third colours

Verein für Leibesübungen Wolfsburg e. V., commonly known as VfL Wolfsburg (pronounced [ˌfaʊ ʔɛf ʔɛl ˈvɔlfsbʊɐ̯k]), is a German professional sports club based in Wolfsburg, Lower Saxony. The club grew out of a multi-sports club for Volkswagen workers in the city of Wolfsburg. It is best known for its football department, but other departments include badminton, handball and athletics.

The men’s team plays in the 2. Bundesliga. Wolfsburg have won the Bundesliga once in their history, in the 2008–09 season, the DFB-Pokal in 2015 and the DFL-Supercup in 2015.

Professional football is run by the spin-off organization VfL Wolfsburg-Fußball GmbH, a wholly owned subsidiary of the Volkswagen Group. Since 2002, Wolfsburg's stadium has been the Volkswagen Arena.

== History ==
=== Foundation ===
The city of Wolfsburg was established on 1 July 1938 under the name Stadt des KdF-Wagens bei Fallersleben to accommodate workers for the newly constructed Volkswagen factory, which was intended to produce the KdF-Wagen—later known as the Volkswagen Beetle. The adjacent factory and town were part of a broader initiative to create an affordable car for the German populace during the Third Reich.

The first football club associated with the Volkswagen plant was BSG Volkswagenwerk Stadt des KdF-Wagen, a typical works team of the era. This team competed in the Gauliga Osthannover, the top division of regional football, during the 1943–44 and 1944–45 seasons.

Following the end of World War II, a new club was formed on 12 September 1945, initially named VSK Wolfsburg. The team adopted green and white as its colors, a tradition that continues to this day. According to club lore, local youth coach Bernd Elberskirch provided ten green jerseys, and white shorts were fashioned from donated bed sheets sewn by local women.

On 15 December 1945, the club faced a significant setback when all but one of its players left to join the newly formed 1. FC Wolfsburg. The sole remaining player, Josef Meyer, collaborated with Willi Hilbert to rebuild the team by recruiting new members. The reorganised club adopted the name VfL Wolfsburg, with VfL standing for Verein für Leibesübungen, which translates to "Club for Physical Exercise."

Within a year, VfL Wolfsburg secured the local Gifhorn championship. In late November 1946, the club played a friendly match against the prominent Gelsenkirchen team Schalke 04 at the Volkswagen-owned stadium, marking its emergence as the company's officially supported team.

=== Postwar play ===
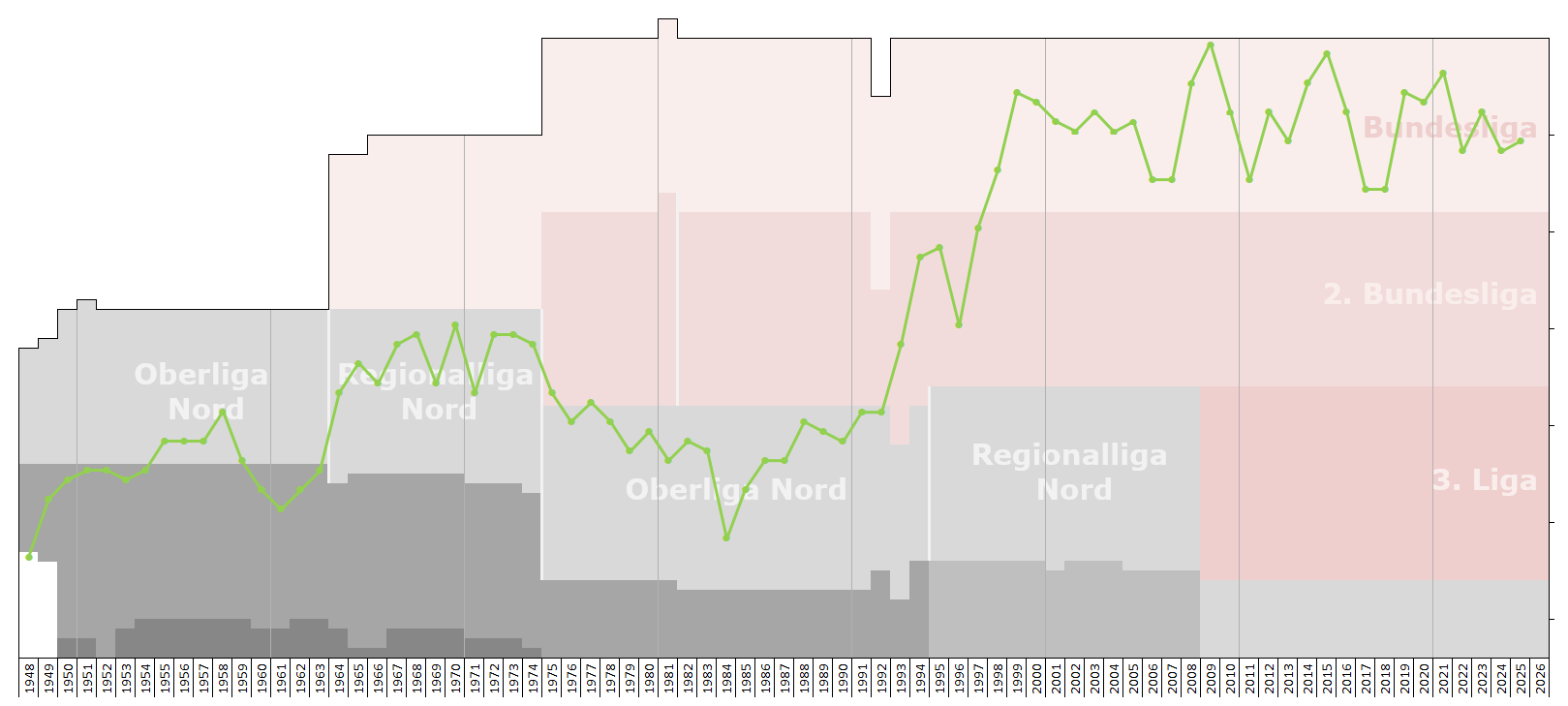
Historical chart of Wolfsburg league performance

The club made slow but steady progress in the following seasons. They captured a number of amateur level championships, but were unable to advance out of the promotion playoffs until finally breaking through to the top tier Oberliga Nord in 1954 with a 2–1 victory over Heider SV. Wolfsburg, however, struggled in the top flight, narrowly missing relegation each season until finally being sent down in 1959. When Germany's first professional football league, the Bundesliga, was formed in 1963, Wolfsburg was playing in the Regionalliga Nord (II), having just moved up from the Verbandsliga Niedersachsen (III), reaching the German Amateur Championship Final that same year (0–1 vs. VfB Stuttgart Amat.).

=== Second division and advance to the Bundesliga ===
Wolfsburg remained a second division team over the next dozen years with their best performance being a second-place finish in 1970. That finish earned the club entry to the promotion round playoffs for the Bundesliga, where they performed poorly and were unable to advance. From the mid-1970s through to the early 1990s, Wolfsburg played as a third division side in the Amateur Oberliga Nord. Consecutive first-place finishes in 1991 and 1992, followed by success in the promotion playoffs, saw the club advance to the 2. Bundesliga for the 1992–93 season.

Wolfsburg continued to experience some success through the 1990s. The team advanced to the final of the German Cup in 1995 where they were beaten 0–3 by Borussia Mönchengladbach, but then went on to the top flight on the strength of a second-place league finish in 1997.

Despite their recent promotion, Wolfsburg developed into a mid-table Bundesliga side. In the 1998–99 season, Wolfsburg, under Wolfgang Wolf, were holding onto the fifth spot in the 33rd round of fixtures, and they had hopes of making fourth place, to gain UEFA Champions League participation. Losing 6–1 away to MSV Duisburg in the final fixture, Wolfsburg finished in sixth place with 55 points and qualified for next season's UEFA Cup. They also qualified for the Intertoto Cup in 2000, 2001, 2003, 2004 and 2005, enjoying their best run in 2003 after reaching the final in which they lost to Italian side Perugia. This was followed by a couple of seasons of little success for the club, just narrowly avoiding relegation with two 15th-place finishes in the 2005–06 and 2006–07 seasons.

=== Bundesliga title and cup success ===
Ahead of the 2007–08 Bundesliga season, Wolfsburg appointed former Bayern Munich manager Felix Magath. The club finished fifth, their highest league position at the time, and qualified for the UEFA Cup for only the second time.

Under Magath, Wolfsburg achieved the greatest success in the club's history by winning the 2008–09 Bundesliga, sealing the title with a 5–1 victory over Werder Bremen on 23 May 2009. The team recorded ten consecutive league wins after the winter break, equalling the Bundesliga record for a single season. Strikers Grafite and Edin Džeko each scored more than 20 league goals, while Zvjezdan Misimović provided 20 assists. The title secured Wolfsburg's first qualification for the UEFA Champions League.

The following season, Wolfsburg dismissed head coach Armin Veh during the winter break with the club tenth in the league. In the 2009–10 UEFA Champions League, they finished third in their group behind Manchester United and CSKA Moscow, entering the 2009–10 UEFA Europa League, where they reached the quarter-finals before being eliminated by Fulham.

Former England manager Steve McClaren was appointed head coach in May 2010, becoming the first English manager in Bundesliga history. He was dismissed in February 2011 and replaced by Pierre Littbarski. Following a run of poor results that left the club in the relegation zone, Wolfsburg reappointed Magath as head coach and sporting director in March 2011. He secured Bundesliga survival but left by mutual consent in October 2012 after a poor start to the season. Dieter Hecking was appointed head coach in December 2012.

Wolfsburg enjoyed renewed success during the 2014–15 season. The club finished runners-up in the 2014–15 Bundesliga and qualified for the 2015–16 UEFA Champions League. On 30 May 2015, Wolfsburg won the 2015 DFB-Pokal final with a 3–1 victory over Borussia Dortmund, securing the first DFB-Pokal in the club's history. They opened the following season by defeating Bayern Munich on penalties in the 2015 DFL-Supercup. During the 2015 summer transfer window, Kevin De Bruyne was sold to Manchester City for a Bundesliga record transfer fee.

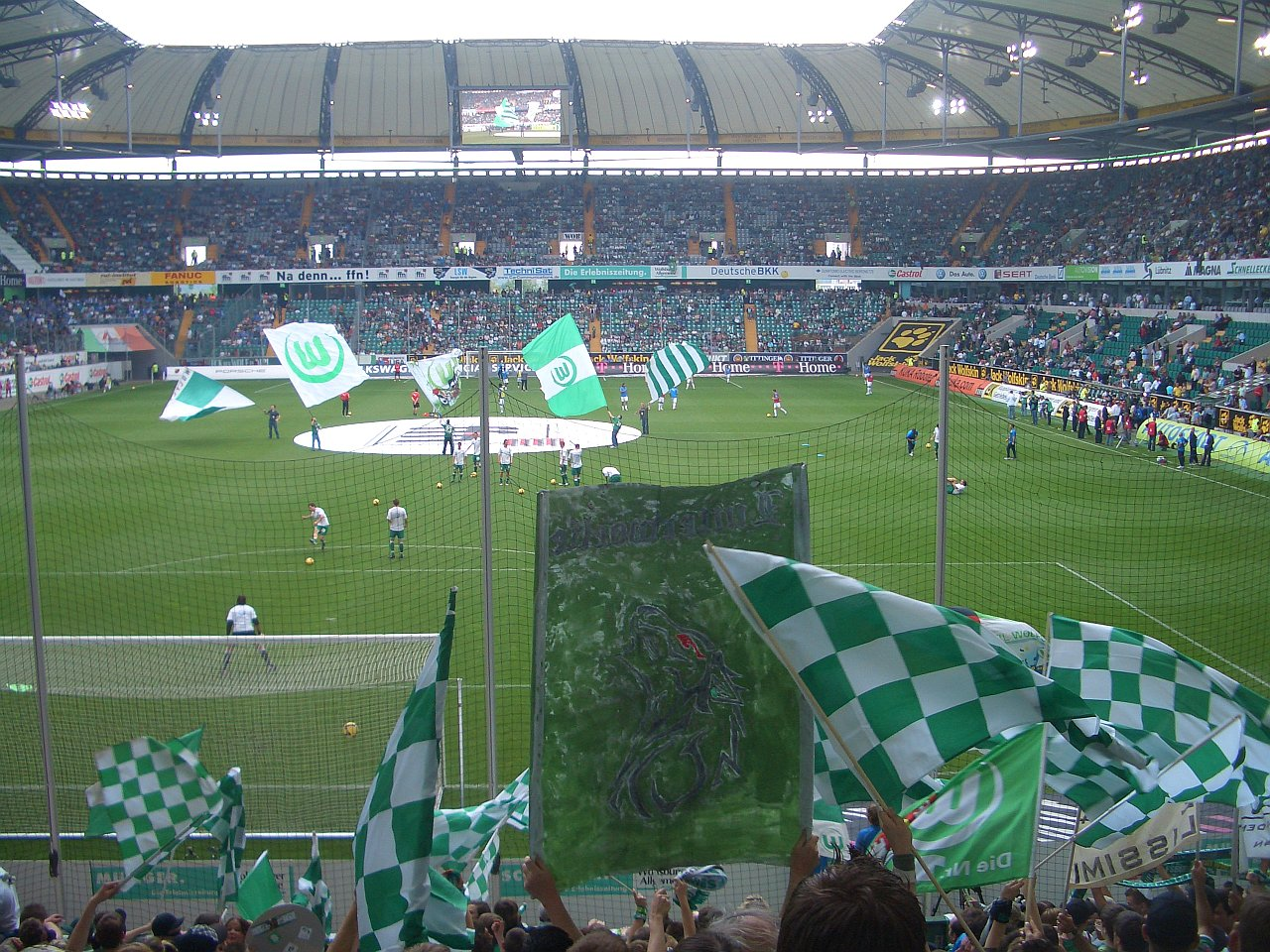
Wolfsburg fans against TSG 1899 Hoffenheim

In the 2015–16 Bundesliga season, Wolfsburg finished eighth. In the Champions League, they reached the quarter-finals for the first time, where they faced Real Madrid and, despite a two-goal aggregate lead from the first match, were eliminated after losing 3–0 at the Bernabéu.

=== Instability, rebuilding and decline ===
Wolfsburg subsequently entered a period of sporting instability marked by relegation battles and frequent managerial changes. On the final matchday of the 2016–17 Bundesliga season, defeat to Hamburger SV dropped the club from 15th to 16th place. Wolfsburg retained their Bundesliga status by defeating regional rivals Eintracht Braunschweig 2–0 on aggregate in the relegation play-offs. The following season brought further upheaval. Head coach Andries Jonker was dismissed in September 2017 and replaced by Martin Schmidt, who resigned in February 2018. Bruno Labbadia took charge and guided the club into the relegation play-offs once again, where Wolfsburg defeated Holstein Kiel 4–1 on aggregate to remain in the Bundesliga.

Ahead of the 2018–19 Bundesliga season, Jörg Schmadtke was appointed managing director for sport, with former Wolfsburg captain Marcel Schäfer becoming sporting director. Under Labbadia, Wolfsburg finished sixth and qualified for the 2019–20 UEFA Europa League. They were eliminated in the qualifying play-off round by AEK Athens.

Labbadia departed in 2019 and was succeeded by Oliver Glasner. Wolfsburg finished seventh in 2019–20 and fourth in the 2020–21 Bundesliga, qualifying for the UEFA Champions League 2021–22. Glasner left the club at the end of the season following disagreements with club management.

Under successor Mark van Bommel, Wolfsburg began the 2021–22 Bundesliga season with four consecutive wins but were eliminated from the DFB-Pokal after a substitution error and subsequently endured a run of poor results. Van Bommel was dismissed in October 2021 and replaced by Florian Kohfeldt, who secured Bundesliga survival with a 12th-place finish but left the club at the end of the season. Wolfsburg finished bottom of their Champions League group.

On 24 May 2022, Wolfsburg appointed Niko Kovač as head coach on a three-year contract. His tenure ended in March 2024. He was replaced by Ralph Hasenhüttl, who led the club to an eleventh-place finish in 2024–25. He was dismissed at the end of the season. Dutch coach Paul Simonis was appointed in June 2025 but was dismissed after ten league matches, with youth coach Daniel Bauer initially taking interim charge before being appointed permanent head coach in December 2025.

After a 2–1 defeat to SC Paderborn 07 in the relegation play-offs, Wolfsburg were relegated from the Bundesliga for the first time, ending a 29-year stay in Germany's top flight.

== Kit manufacturers and shirt sponsors ==
Period	Kit manufacturer
1976–1993	Adidas
1994–1996	Reusch
1997–2003	Puma
2004–2009	Nike
2010–2013	Adidas
2014–2015	Kappa
2016–present	Nike

Period	Shirt sponsor
1986–1989	Volkswagen
1990	VAG Kreditbank
1991	Kelts
1992	Volkswagen
1993	Volkswagen/VAG Kreditbank
1994–present	Volkswagen (2025: Volkswagen T-Roc, 2008: Volkswagen Polo, 2004: Volkswagen GTI, 1995: Volkswagen Golf)

== Home stadium ==
Wolfsburg plays at the Volkswagen Arena, a multi-purpose stadium which seats a total capacity of 30,000 spectators. Before construction was finished in 2002, Wolfsburg played their home games at the 21,600 capacity VfL-Stadium. The stadium is currently used mostly for the home games of Wolfsburg, and is the site where they won their first Bundesliga title in the 2008–09 season. The amateur squad and the women's association football section is playing since 2015 at the newly built AOK Stadion with a capacity of 5200 people. There is also a new VfL-Center with offices and training areas and the VfL-FußballWelt, an interactive exhibition about the VfL.

== Honours ==
=== Domestic ===
- Bundesliga:
  - Winners: 2008–09
- DFB-Pokal:
  - Winners: 2014–15
- DFL-Supercup:
  - Winners: 2015

=== Regional ===
- Deutsche Amateurmeisterschaft:
  - Runners-up: 1963
- Amateuroberliga Niedersachsen-Ost (II):
  - Winners: 1952, 1954, 1963
- Regionalliga Nord (II):
  - Runners-up: 1970
- Oberliga Nord (III):
  - Winners: 1991, 1992
  - Runners-up: 1976, 1978, 1988
- Lower Saxony Cup (Tiers 3–5):
  - Winners: 1962, 2002, 2003

=== Youth ===
- German Under 19 championship:
  - Winners: 2010–11, 2012–13
  - Runners-up: 2007–08
- Under 19 Bundesliga North/Northeast:
  - Winners: 2007–08, 2010–11, 2011–12, 2012–13
- Under 17 Bundesliga North/Northeast:
  - Winners: 2008–09, 2015–16
- Weifang Cup:
  - Winners: 2015, 2017

== Players ==
=== Current squad ===
As of 23 September 2026

Note: Flags indicate national team as defined under FIFA eligibility rules; some limited exceptions apply. Players may hold more than one non-FIFA nationality.

No.	Pos.	Nation	Player
1	GK	GER	Timon Wellenreuther
2	DF	GER	Kilian Fischer
5	MF	BRA	Vini Souza
6	DF	GER	Hauke Wahl
7	FW	JPN	Kento Shiogai
8	MF	HUN	Bence Dárdai
10	FW	SCO	Fraser Hornby
11	FW	GER	Fabian Reese
12	GK	AUT	Pavao Pervan
13	DF	BRA	Rogério
14	MF	GER	Pharell Hensel
17	FW	SWE	Alexander Bernhardsson
18	DF	GHA	Jonas Adjetey
19	FW	GER	Robert Glatzel
20	MF	GER	Muhammed Damar

No.	Pos.	Nation	Player
21	DF	DEN	Joakim Mæhle
22	DF	FRA	Mathys Angély
23	FW	SUI	Alessio Besio
25	DF	GER	Aaron Zehnter
26	DF	FRA	Saël Kumbedi
27	MF	GER	Maximilian Arnold (captain)
30	GK	POL	Jakub Zieliński
31	MF	GER	Yannick Gerhardt
32	MF	SWE	Mattias Svanberg
33	DF	BRA	Cleiton
36	MF	BEL	Aster Vranckx
37	MF	KOS	Elvis Rexhbeçaj
42	FW	FIN	Bruno Katz
43	FW	GER	Trevor Benedict

=== Out on loan ===
Note: Flags indicate national team as defined under FIFA eligibility rules; some limited exceptions apply. Players may hold more than one non-FIFA nationality.

No.	Pos.	Nation	Player
—	GK	POL	Kamil Grabara (at Juventus until 30 June 2027)
—	DF	GER	Till Neininger (at Dynamo Dresden until 30 June 2027)
—	MF	GER	Elia Dittrich (at Eintracht Trier until 30 June 2027)

No.	Pos.	Nation	Player
—	FW	ALG	Mohamed Amoura (at Nice until 30 June 2027)
—	FW	DEN	Andreas Skov Olsen (at İstanbul Başakşehir until 30 June 2027)

=== Retired numbers ===
Following the death of Junior Malanda in 2015, the club retired the number 19 shirt. Subsequently, individual players have been nominated by the club to wear that number in his honour. In the 2019–20 season, Kevin Mbabu wore it, followed by Lovro Majer, and then Jesper Lindstrøm.

=== Women's section ===
The women's team have won a treble of Bundesliga, DFB Pokal and the UEFA Women's Champions League in 2012–13. They defended their Champions League title in 2014.

== Coaching staff & Sports administration ==
As of 6 July 2026

Position	Name
Head coach	(Germany) Tobias Strobl
Assistant coach	(Germany) Jérôme Polenz (Switzerland) Murat Ural (Germany) Julian Klamt (Germany) Sergej Schmik
Goalkeeper coach	(Germany) Pascal Formann
Development coach	(Netherlands) Koen Stam
Managing director	(Germany) Dieter Hecking
Sporting director	(Switzerland) Pirmin Schwegler
Coordinator sport	(Germany) Benjamin Hoppenz
Head of media and communication	(Germany) Dirk Borth
Head of sports communication	(Germany) Barbara Ertel-Leicht
Head match analyst	(Germany) Martin Raschick
Match analyst	(Germany) David Neugebauer
Head of athletic performance	(Germany) Johannes Engert
Fitness coach	(Netherlands) Thijs Tummers
Fitness coach & sports scientist	(Germany) Fabian Klotz
Team doctor	(Germany) Dr. Gunter Wilhelm (Germany) Dr. Stephan Bornhardt
Doctor	(Germany) Dr. Günter Pfeiler
Internist	(Germany) Dr. Gerlinde Menzel
Sport psychologist	(Germany) Sinikka Heisler
Chiropractor	(Germany) Alexander Steinbrenner
Podologist	(Germany) Sara-Elizabeth Schulz
Head physiotherapist	(Germany) Christian Knye
Physiotherapist	(Germany) Sascha Weiß (Germany) Patrick Kasprowski (Germany) Dennis Wöhr (Germany) Alexander Jura
Rehabilitation coach	(Germany) Michele Putaro
Head of team management & operations	(Germany) Jonas Garzke
Team supervisor	(Germany) Ines Buerke (Germany) Lena Hoffmann
Integration & player care coordinator	(Germany) Tibeau Grüßem
Nutritionist	(Germany) Eva Althaus
Chef	(Germany) Andre Göldner (Germany) Luca Jung
Head of kit management	(Germany) Nils Scholz
Kit man	(Croatia) Kristian Vladić
Kit man & fleet manager	(Germany) Ari Mohammad
Laundry	(Germany) Nicole Rößler
Head of greenkeeping	(Germany) Jan Naumann

== Records and statistics ==
=== Most appearances ===
Includes appearances in all competitions.

Rank	Player	Matches
1	(Germany) Maximilian Arnold	475
2	(Switzerland) Diego Benaglio	321
3	(Germany) Marcel Schäfer	312
4	(Germany) Yannick Gerhardt	292
5	(Belgium) Koen Casteels	275
6	(France) Josuha Guilavogui	265
7	(Germany) Detlev Dammeier	247
8	(Germany) Robin Knoche	226
9	(Slovakia) Miroslav Karhan	201
10	(Germany) Alexander Madlung	194

=== Top scorers ===
Includes goals in all competitions.

Rank	Player	Goals
1	(Bosnia and Herzegovina) Edin Džeko	85
2	(Brazil) Grafite	75
3	(Netherlands) Wout Weghorst	70
4	(Argentina) Diego Klimowicz	67
5	(Germany) Maximilian Arnold	49
6	(Netherlands) Bas Dost	48
6	(Poland) Andrzej Juskowiak	48
8	(Germany) Roy Präger	41
9	(Bulgaria) Martin Petrov	38
10	(Denmark) Jonas Wind	35

== Coaches ==
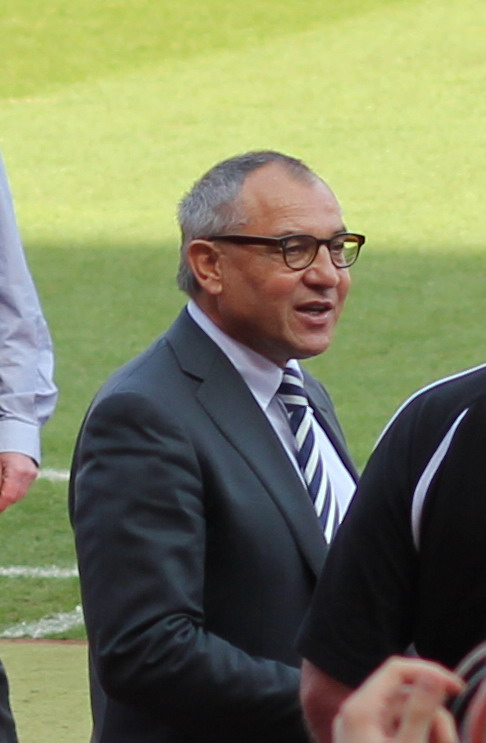
Felix Magath led Wolfsburg to win the Bundesliga in 2009.

- (Germany) Günter Mettke (1949–1954, player-coach)
- (Germany) Ludwig Lachner (1954–55)
- (Germany) Ernst Sontow (1955–56)
- (Germany) Josef Kretschmann (1956–57)
- (Germany) Ludwig Lachner (1957)
- (Germany) Walter Risse (1957–58)
- (Hungary) Imre Farkaszinski (1958–59)
- (Germany) Ludwig Lachner (1 July 1963 – 30 June 1966)
- (Hungary) Imre Farkaszinski (1 July 1966 – 31 December 1974)
- (Germany) Fritz Schollmeyer (1 January 1975 – 29 April 1975)
- (Germany) Günther Brockmeyer (April 1975)
- (Germany) Paul Kietzmann (3 May 1975 – 28 November 1975)
- (Socialist Federal Republic of Yugoslavia) Radoslav Momirski (2 December 1976 – 4 March 1978)
- (Hungary) Imre Farkaszinski (March 1978 – Dec 1978)
- (Netherlands) Henk van Meteren (Dec 1978 – April 1979)
- (Germany) Wilfried Kemmer (April 1979 – Oct 1983)
- (Hungary) Imre Farkaszinski (Oct 1983 – June 1984)
- (Germany) Wolf-Rüdiger Krause (July 1984 – June 1988)
- (Germany) Horst Hrubesch (1 July 1988 – 30 June 1989)
- (Germany) Ernst Menzel (July 1989 – June 1991)
- (Germany) Uwe Erkenbrecher (1 July 1991 – 10 February 1993)
- (Germany) Eckhard Krautzun (16 February 1993 – 4 April 1995)
- (Germany) Gerd Roggensack (6 April 1995 – 22 October 1995)
- (Germany) Willi Reimann (23 October 1995 – 17 March 1998)
- (Germany) Wolfgang Wolf (23 March 1998 – 4 March 2003)
- (Germany) Jürgen Röber (4 March 2003 – 3 April 2004)
- (Belgium) Eric Gerets (4 April 2004 – 29 May 2005)
- (Germany) Holger Fach (1 July 2005 – 19 December 2005)
- (Germany) Klaus Augenthaler (29 December 2005 – 19 May 2007)
- (Germany) Felix Magath (1 July 2007 – 30 June 2009)
- (Germany) Armin Veh (1 July 2009 – 25 January 2010)
- (Germany) L-G. Köstner (interim) (25 January 2010 – 30 June 2010)
- (England) Steve McClaren (1 July 2010 – 7 February 2011)
- (Germany) P. Littbarski (interim) (8 February 2011 – 17 March 2011)
- (Germany) Felix Magath (18 March 2011 – 25 October 2012)
- (Germany) L-G. Köstner (interim) (25 October 2012 – 31 December 2012)
- (Germany) Dieter Hecking (1 January 2013 – 17 October 2016)
- (France) Valérien Ismaël (17 October 2016 – 26 February 2017)
- (Netherlands) Andries Jonker (27 February 2017 – 17 September 2017)
- (Switzerland) Martin Schmidt (18 September 2017 – 19 February 2018)
- (Germany) Bruno Labbadia (20 February 2018 – 29 June 2019)
- (Austria) Oliver Glasner (1 July 2019 – 26 May 2021)
- (Netherlands) Mark van Bommel (1 July 2021 – 24 October 2021)
- (Germany) Florian Kohfeldt (26 October 2021 – 15 May 2022)
- (Croatia) Niko Kovač (24 May 2022 – 17 March 2024)
- (Austria) Ralph Hasenhüttl (17 March 2024 – 4 May 2025)
- (Germany) Daniel Bauer (interim) (4 May 2025 – 12 June 2025)
- (Netherlands) Paul Simonis (12 June 2025 – 9 November 2025)
- (Germany) Daniel Bauer (9 November 2025 – 8 March 2026)
- (Germany) Dieter Hecking (9 March 2026 – )

== See also ==
- Works team
