= Peter Christiansen (footballer, born 1975) =

Danish footballer and scout

Personal information
- Date of birth: 30 January 1975 (age 51)
- Place of birth: Hillerød, Denmark
- Height: 1.87 m (6 ft 2 in)
- Position: Defender

Senior career*
Years	Team	Apps	(Gls)
1993–1999	Vejle Boldklub		
2000–2005	F.C. Copenhagen	90	(2)
2005–2006	Helsingborgs IF	13	(0)
2006–2007	Randers	10	(0)
- * Club domestic league appearances and goals

Peter Christiansen (born 30 January 1975) is a Danish former professional footballer who played as a defender. He is chief scout for Danish Superliga club Randers FC. He started his career with Vejle Boldklub and F.C. Copenhagen in Denmark. Christiansen joined Swedish club Helsingborgs IF in 2005, but after an unsuccessful year at the club, he moved to Randers.

== Honours ==
F.C. Copenhagen

- Danish Superliga: 2000–01, 2002–03
- Danish Cup: 2003–04
- Danish Super Cup: 2001
