= Martens (surname) =

Martens is a surname. Notable people with the surname include:

- Adolf Martens (1850–1914), German metallurgist
- Camilla Martens (born 1989), Danish badminton player
- Camille Martens (born 1976), Canadian rhythmic gymnast
- Carl Christian Martens (1754–1820), Danish master bricklayer and architect
- Caroline Martens (born 1986), Norwegian retired golfer
- Claire Martens (born 1987), Dutch politician
- Conrad Martens (1801–1878), English-born landscape painter in Australia
- Daniel Martens (born 1999), Singaporean footballer
- Dirk Martens (1446 or 1447–1534), Flemish printer and editor
- Eckhard Martens (born 1951), German rower
- Ernesto Martens (1933–2024), Mexican chemical engineer and Secretary of Energy under President Vicente Fox
- Frédéric Martens (1806–1885), Italian-French photographer, engraver and inventor
- Friedrich Martens (1845–1909), Russian diplomat and jurist
- Friderich Martens (1635–1699), German physician and naturalist
- Garth Martens, 21st century Canadian poet
- George Martens (1874–1949), Australian politician
- George Martens (jockey) (born 1958), American jockey who won the 1981 Belmont Stakes
- Gertjan Martens (born 1988), Belgian footballer
- Gustav Ludolf Martens (1818–1882), German architect and state master builder of Kiel
- Harold Martens (1941–2023), Canadian politician
- Henry Martens (1790–1868), English military illustrator and painter
- Hentie Martens (born 1971), South African former rugby union player
- Jacky Martens (born 1963), Belgian motocross race team manager and former racer
- Jamie Martens, Canadian politician
- Jochen Martens (born 1941), German zoologist
- Johan Martens (1861–1932), Norwegian ship broker, politician and sports official
- Johanna Martens (1818–1867), Dutch woman who posed as a man to try to enlist in the Dutch army to be with the man she loved
- Johannes Martens (1870–1938), Norwegian newspaper editor and politician
- Jürgen Martens (born 1959), German politician and lawyer
- Krzysztof Martens, Polish bridge player and author
- Kurt Martens (born 1973), Belgian professor and canon lawyer
- Lieke Martens (born 1992), Dutch footballer
- Ludo Martens (1946–2011), Belgian communist, historian and chairman of the Workers' Party of Belgium
- Ludwig Martens (1875–1948), Russian revolutionary and Soviet diplomat and engineer
- Lukas Märtens (born 2001), German swimmer
- Maarten Martens (born 1984), Belgian footballer
- Marilú Martens, Peruvian politician, Minister of Education of Peru from 2016 to 2017
- Martin Martens (1797–1863), Belgian botanist
- Maria Martens (born 1955), a Dutch politician
- Maurice Martens (born 1947), Belgian footballer
- Patrick Martens (born 1978), Dutch actor
- Paul Martens (born 1983), German former road bicycle racer
- René Martens (born 1955), Belgian cyclist
- Ronny Martens (born 1958), Belgian footballer
- Rudy Martens (born ca. 1958), Belgian organizational theorist
- Sandy Martens (born 1972), Belgian footballer
- Sililo Martens (born 1977), New Zealand-born former Tongan international rugby union player
- Theo Martens (born 1990), Dutch footballer
- Theodor Martens (1822–1884), German painter
- Uwe Martens (born 1970), German writer and poet
- Victoria Martens (2006–2016), American child murder victim
- Walter F. Martens (1890–1969), American architect
- Wilfried Martens (1936–2013), Flemish Belgian politician, twice Prime Minister of Belgium
- Zanda Martens (born 1984), Latvian-German politician

== See also ==
- Von Martens, a surname
