= Von Martens =

Von Martens is a surname. Notable people with the surname include:

- Eduard von Martens (1831–1904), German zoologist, son of Georg Matthias von Martens
- Friedrich Fromhold von Martens (1845–1909), Russian diplomat and jurist
- Georg Friedrich von Martens (1756–1821), German jurist and diplomat
- Georg Matthias von Martens (1788–1872), German lawyer, botanist and phycologist, father of Eduard
- Luise von Martens (1828–1894), German painter and draughtswoman
- Valerie von Martens (1894–1986), German-Austrian actress born Valérie Pajér Edle von Mayersperg

== See also ==
- Martens (surname)
