= Admir Mehmedi =

Swiss footballer (born 1991)

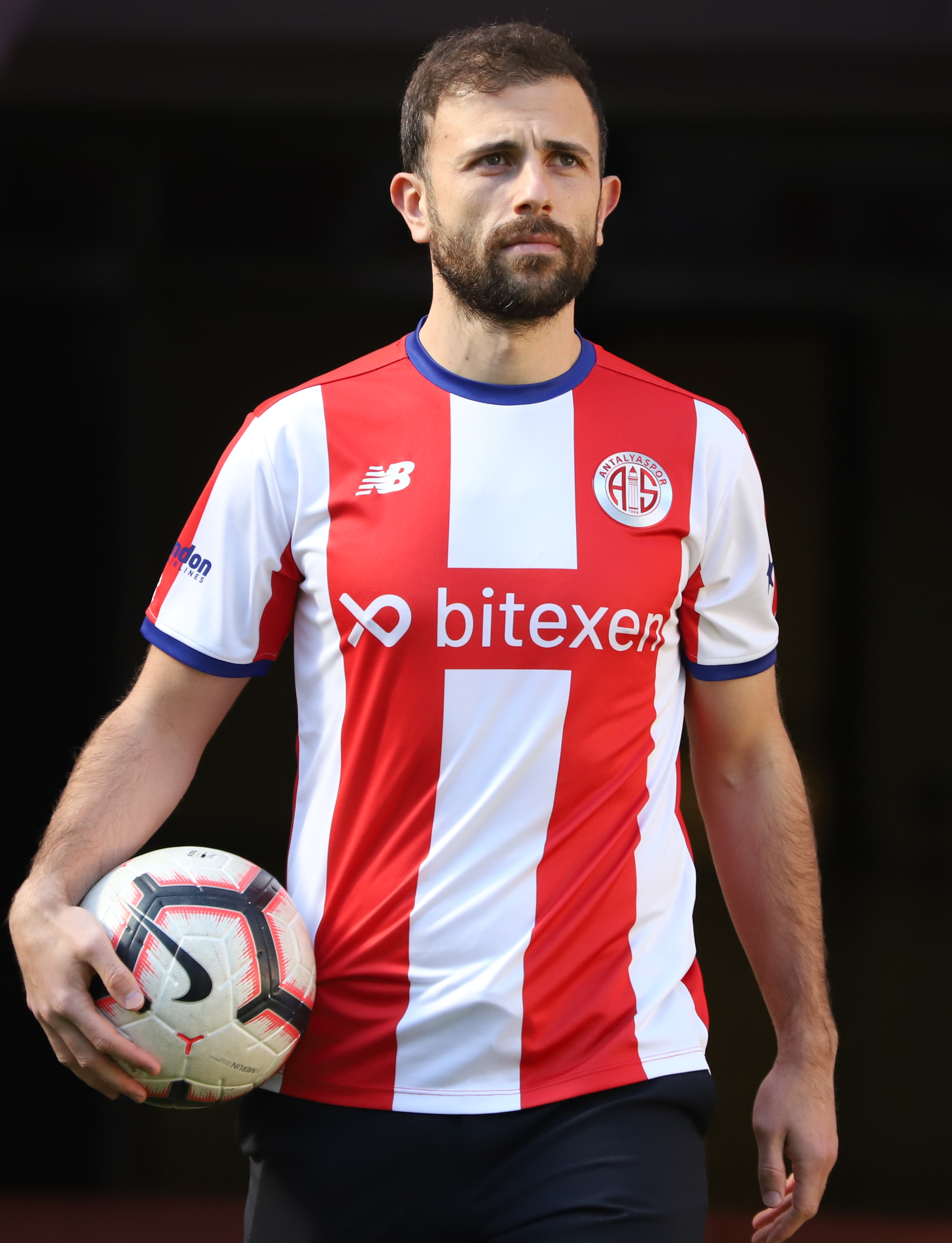
- Mehmedi with Antalyaspor in 2022

Personal information
- Full name: Admir Mehmedi
- Date of birth: 16 March 1991 (age 35)
- Place of birth: Gostivar, SR Macedonia, SFR Yugoslavia
- Height: 1.83 m (6 ft 0 in)
- Positions: Second striker; centre forward

Youth career
- 1999–2000: Bellinzona
- 2000–2006: Winterthur
- 2006–2008: Zürich

Senior career*
| Years | Team | Apps | (Gls) |
| 2008–2012 | Zürich | 84 | (19) |
| 2012–2014 | Dynamo Kyiv | 25 | (1) |
| 2013–2014 | → SC Freiburg (loan) | 32 | (12) |
| 2014–2015 | SC Freiburg | 27 | (4) |
| 2015–2018 | Bayer Leverkusen | 62 | (7) |
| 2018–2022 | VfL Wolfsburg | 72 | (9) |
| 2022–2023 | Antalyaspor | 17 | (1) |
| Total | | 319 | (53) |

International career
| 2006 | Switzerland U16 | 3 | (3) |
| 2007–2008 | Switzerland U17 | 16 | (5) |
| 2008–2010 | Switzerland U19 | 26 | (11) |
| 2010 | Switzerland U20 | 2 | (0) |
| 2010–2011 | Switzerland U21 | 9 | (6) |
| 2011–2021 | Switzerland | 76 | (10) |
| 2012 | Switzerland Olympic | 4 | (1) |

Managerial career
- 2023–2024: Schaffhausen (sporting director)
- * Club domestic league appearances and goals

Admir Mehmedi (born 16 March 1991) is a Swiss former professional footballer who played as a second striker or centre forward. Born in North Macedonia, Mehmedi represented the Switzerland national team. He was most recently the sporting director of FC Schaffhausen.

== Early life ==
Mehmedi was born in Gostivar, North Macedonia. He is of Albanian heritage. At the age of 2, his family emigrated to Switzerland. In 2006, he moved to Zürich.

== Club career ==
=== Zürich ===
Being a first team regular in 2010, Mehmedi established himself as a physical striker, excellent in the box, as well as having a good turn of pace, and he was also technically great. During his time with Zürich, Mehmedi scored nineteen goals and provided nine assists.

In the January transfer window in 2012, Mehmedi moved to Dynamo Kyiv.

=== Freiburg ===
On 11 July 2013, Mehmedi moved to SC Freiburg. Freiburg's acting sporting director Klemens Hartenbach stated that he was "delighted" the transfer went through. Hartenbach stated, "He's a very versatile attacking player who understands the game and has already proven he can play at the highest level". On 26 May 2014, Freiburg decided to buy Mehmedi for a reported €6 million after having a good season, scoring 12 goals in 32 games during his loan spell with the Bundesliga side.

=== Bayer Leverkusen ===
On 11 June 2015, Mehmedi joined Bayer Leverkusen after Freiburg was relegated from the Bundesliga.

=== VfL Wolfsburg ===
On 31 January 2018, Mehmedi joined VfL Wolfsburg on a four-year deal for €8 million.

=== Antalyaspor and retirement ===
On 14 January 2022, Mehmedi signed a 2.5-year contract with Turkish club Antalyaspor.

At the end of the 2022–23 season, the forward terminated his contract with the club by mutual consent; on 30 August 2023, he publicly announced his retirement from professional football, citing his desire to spend more time with his family and pursue a coaching career as the main reasons behind his decision.

== International career ==
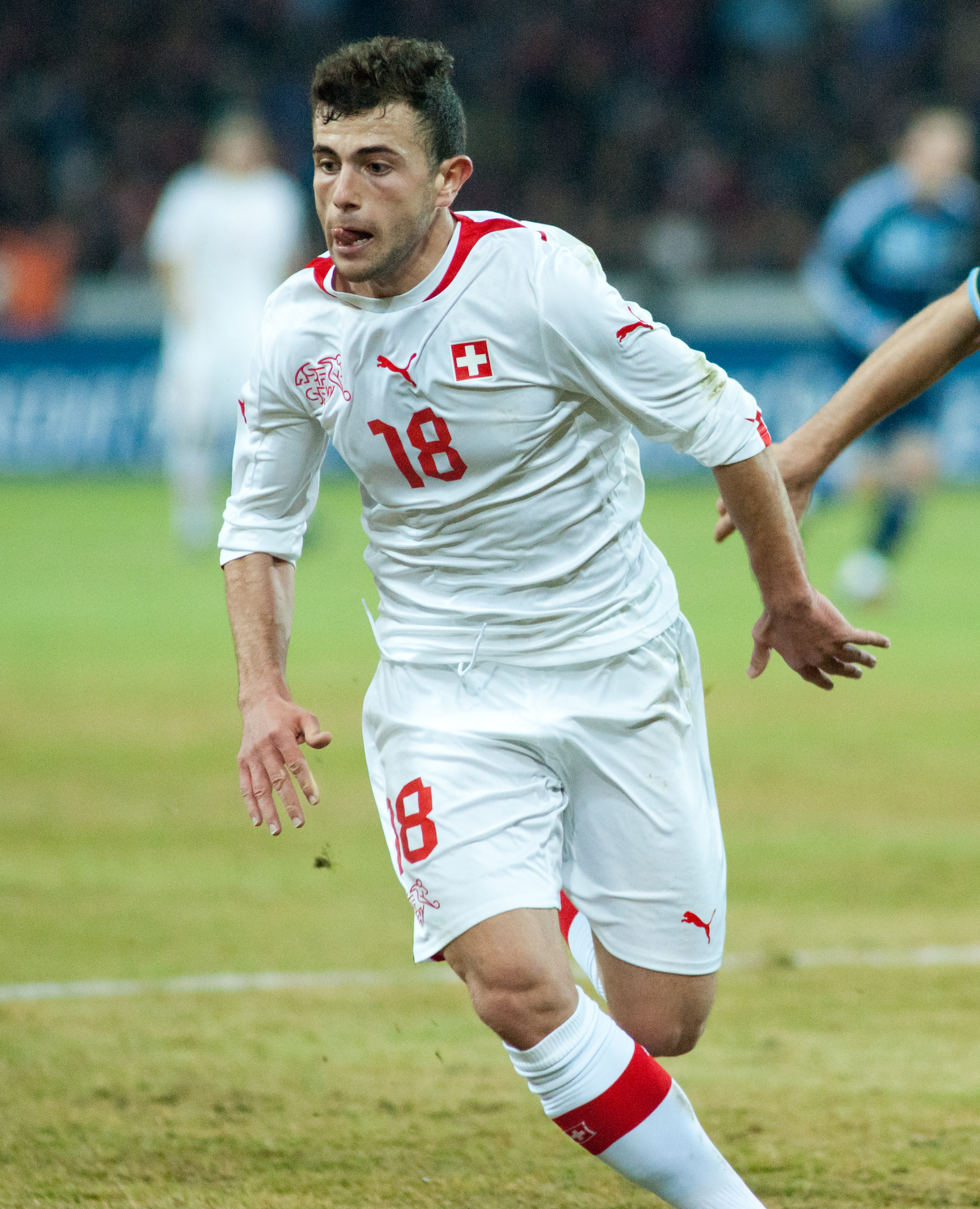
Mehmedi playing for Switzerland in 2012

=== Under-21 ===
Mehmedi was a crucial member of the Swiss U-21 side in the 2011 UEFA European Under-21 Football Championship. Mehmedi received the silver boot with three goals in the tournament and was selected in the UEFA Euro U-21 2011 Team of the Tournament.

=== Senior ===
Mehmedi was part of the Swiss team at the 2012 Summer Olympics.

Mehmedi made his debut for the Swiss national team against England in a UEFA Euro 2012 qualifying match, coming on as a substitute. Mehmedi scored his first goal for Switzerland in his side's 5–3 win over Germany. The Swiss national side had not beaten the Germans since 1956.

On 15 June 2014, he replaced Valentin Stocker at half time in Switzerland's opening 2014 FIFA World Cup match against Ecuador. Two minutes later, he headed in Ricardo Rodríguez's corner to equalise as Switzerland eventually won 2–1.

Two years to the day after he scored in the 2014 World Cup against Ecuador, Mehmedi scored Switzerland's equaliser in their 1–1 group-stage draw against Romania in UEFA Euro 2016.

Following his participation in Switzerland's UEFA Euro 2020 campaign, in which they reached the quarter-finals for the first time, Mehmedi officially announced his retirement from the national side on 16 July 2021.

== Post-playing career ==
Just three months after retiring as an active footballer, he joined FC Schaffhausen as their new sporting director on 5 December 2023. His mission to secure the team's place in the Swiss Challenge League was successful. Despite this, he requested a mutual termination of his contract on 27 May 2024, just six months after his appointment, as he could not agree with the board's proposed budget reductions.

== Personal life ==
In 2016, Mehmedi and his father arranged to build a new house for an impoverished family in Padalište, saying: "You know, building a house is not cheap, but I appreciate what I have, and I want others to feel fine as well."

Mehmedi is a Muslim and he's married with two children.

== Career statistics ==
=== Club ===
As of 1 November 2024

Appearances and goals by club, season and competition
| Club | Season | League | | | Cup | | Europe | | Total | |
| Club | Season | Division | Apps | Goals | Apps | Goals | Apps | Goals | Apps | Goals |
|---|---|---|---|---|---|---|---|---|---|---|
| Zürich | 2008–09 | Swiss Super League | 11 | 2 | 2 | 0 | 2 (Note: Appearances in UEFA Cup) | 0 | 15 | 2 |
| Zürich | 2009–10 | Swiss Super League | 22 | 3 | 2 | 3 | 2 (Note: Appearances in UEFA Champions League) | 0 | 26 | 6 |
| Zürich | 2010–11 | Swiss Super League | 33 | 10 | 4 | 3 | — | | 37 | 13 |
| Zürich | 2011–12 | Swiss Super League | 18 | 4 | 3 | 1 | 10 (Note: Four appearances and two goals in UEFA Champions League, six appearances and one goal in UEFA Europa League) | 3 | 31 | 8 |
| Zürich | Total | | 84 | 19 | 11 | 7 | 14 | 3 | 109 | 29 |
| Dynamo Kyiv | 2011–12 | Ukrainian Premier League | 9 | 1 | 0 | 0 | — | | 9 | 1 |
| Dynamo Kyiv | 2012–13 | Ukrainian Premier League | 16 | 0 | 1 | 0 | 5 (Note: Three appearances in UEFA Champions League, two appearances in UEFA Europa League) | 0 | 22 | 0 |
| Dynamo Kyiv | Total | | 25 | 1 | 1 | 0 | 5 | 0 | 31 | 1 |
| SC Freiburg | 2013–14 | Bundesliga | 32 | 12 | 3 | 0 | 5 | 1 | 40 | 13 |
| SC Freiburg | 2014–15 | Bundesliga | 28 | 4 | 4 | 3 | — | | 32 | 7 |
| SC Freiburg | Total | | 60 | 16 | 7 | 3 | 5 | 1 | 72 | 20 |
| Bayer Leverkusen | 2015–16 | Bundesliga | 28 | 2 | 2 | 0 | 11 (Note: Seven appearances and five goals in UEFA Champions League, four appearances in UEFA Europa League) | 5 | 41 | 7 |
| Bayer Leverkusen | 2016–17 | Bundesliga | 22 | 3 | 2 | 0 | 6 | 1 | 30 | 4 |
| Bayer Leverkusen | 2017–18 | Bundesliga | 12 | 2 | 3 | 0 | — | | 15 | 3 |
| Bayer Leverkusen | Total | | 62 | 7 | 7 | 0 | 17 | 6 | 86 | 13 |
| VfL Wolfsburg | 2017–18 | Bundesliga | 5 | 1 | 1 | 0 | — | | 6 | 1 |
| VfL Wolfsburg | 2018–19 | Bundesliga | 26 | 6 | 2 | 1 | — | | 28 | 7 |
| VfL Wolfsburg | 2019–20 | Bundesliga | 21 | 2 | 0 | 0 | 5 (Note: Appearances in UEFA Europa League) | 1 | 26 | 3 |
| VfL Wolfsburg | 2020–21 | Bundesliga | 18 | 0 | 1 | 0 | 3 | 2 | 22 | 2 |
| VfL Wolfsburg | 2021–22 | Bundesliga | 1 | 0 | 1 | 0 | — | | 2 | 0 |
| VfL Wolfsburg | Total | | 71 | 9 | 5 | 1 | 8 | 3 | 84 | 13 |
| Antalyaspor | 2021–22 | Süper Lig | 7 | 1 | 1 | 0 | — | | 8 | 1 |
| Antalyaspor | 2022–23 | Süper Lig | 10 | 0 | 2 | 0 | — | | 12 | 0 |
| Antalyaspor | Total | | 17 | 1 | 1 | 0 | 0 | 0 | 20 | 1 |
| Career total | | | 319 | 53 | 32 | 11 | 49 | 13 | 402 | 77 |

=== International ===
Appearances and goals by national team and year
| National team | Year | Apps | Goals |
|---|---|---|---|
| Switzerland | 2011 | 7 | 0 |
| Switzerland | 2012 | 6 | 1 |
| Switzerland | 2013 | 5 | 0 |
| Switzerland | 2014 | 12 | 1 |
| Switzerland | 2015 | 8 | 1 |
| Switzerland | 2016 | 12 | 4 |
| Switzerland | 2017 | 8 | 0 |
| Switzerland | 2018 | 2 | 1 |
| Switzerland | 2019 | 5 | 1 |
| Switzerland | 2020 | 5 | 1 |
| Switzerland | 2021 | 6 | 0 |
| Total | | 76 | 10 |

Scores and results list Switzerland's goal tally first, score column indicates score after each Mehmedi goal.

List of international goals scored by Admir Mehmedi
| No. | Date | Venue | Cap | Opponent | Score | Result | Competition |
|---|---|---|---|---|---|---|---|
| 1 | 26 May 2012 | St. Jakob-Park, Basel, Switzerland | 9 | Germany | 5–3 | 5–3 | Friendly |
| 2 | 15 June 2014 | Estádio Nacional Mané Garrincha, Brasília, Brazil | 22 | Ecuador | 1–1 | 2–1 | 2014 FIFA World Cup |
| 3 | 9 October 2015 | AFG Arena, St. Gallen, Switzerland | 35 | San Marino | 3–0 | 7–0 | UEFA Euro 2016 qualification |
| 4 | 3 June 2016 | Cornaredo Stadium, Lugano, Switzerland | 42 | Moldova | 2–1 | 2–1 | Friendly |
| 5 | 15 June 2016 | Parc des Princes, Paris, France | 44 | Romania | 1–1 | 1–1 | UEFA Euro 2016 |
| 6 | 6 September 2016 | St. Jakob-Park, Basel, Switzerland | 47 | Portugal | 2–0 | 2–0 | 2018 FIFA World Cup qualification |
| 7 | 10 October 2016 | Estadi Nacional, Andorra la Vella, Andorra | 49 | Andorra | 2–0 | 2–1 | 2018 FIFA World Cup qualification |
| 8 | 8 September 2018 | Kybunpark, St. Gallen, Switzerland | 59 | Iceland | 6–0 | 6–0 | 2018–19 UEFA Nations League A |
| 9 | 8 September 2019 | Stade Tourbillon, Sion, Switzerland | 63 | Gibraltar | 2–0 | 4–0 | UEFA Euro 2020 qualification |
| 10 | 11 November 2020 | Den Dreef, Leuven, Belgium | 69 | Belgium | 1–0 | 1–2 | Friendly |

== Honours ==
Switzerland U21

- UEFA European Under-21 Championship runner-up: 2011
