= 2020–21 VfL Wolfsburg season =

VfL Wolfsburg
2020–21 season
- Executive director: Frank Witter
- Head coach: Oliver Glasner
- Stadium: Volkswagen Arena
- Bundesliga: 4th
- DFB-Pokal: Quarter-finals
- UEFA Europa League: Play-off round
- Top goalscorer: League: Wout Weghorst (20); All: Wout Weghorst (25)
- Biggest win: VfL Wolfsburg 5–0 Schalke 04
- Biggest defeat: Borussia Dortmund 2–0 VfL Wolfsburg; RB Leipzig 2–0 VfL Wolfsburg
Home colours	Away colours	Third colours

The 2020–21 season was the 76th season in the existence of VfL Wolfsburg and the club's 24th consecutive season in the top flight of German football. In addition to the domestic league, VfL Wolfsburg participated in this season's editions of the DFB-Pokal and in the UEFA Europa League. The season covered the period from 6 August 2020 to 30 June 2021.

== Players ==
=== First-team squad ===
As of 31 January 2021

Note: Flags indicate national team as defined under FIFA eligibility rules; some limited exceptions apply. Players may hold more than one non-FIFA nationality.

No.	Pos.	Nation	Player
1	GK	BEL	Koen Casteels (vice-captain)
3	DF	FRA	Maxence Lacroix
5	DF	NED	Jeffrey Bruma
6	DF	BRA	Paulo Otávio
7	MF	CRO	Josip Brekalo
8	MF	SUI	Renato Steffen
9	FW	NED	Wout Weghorst
12	GK	AUT	Pavao Pervan
14	MF	SUI	Admir Mehmedi
15	DF	FRA	Jérôme Roussillon
17	FW	GER	Maximilian Philipp (on loan from Dynamo Moscow)
19	DF	SUI	Kevin Mbabu
20	MF	GER	Ridle Baku

No.	Pos.	Nation	Player
21	FW	POL	Bartosz Białek
23	MF	FRA	Josuha Guilavogui (captain)
24	MF	AUT	Xaver Schlager
25	DF	USA	John Brooks
27	MF	GER	Maximilian Arnold (3rd captain)
30	GK	GER	Niklas Klinger
31	MF	GER	Yannick Gerhardt
33	FW	GER	Daniel Ginczek
34	DF	CRO	Marin Pongračić
35	GK	GER	Lino Kasten
39	DF	GER	Tim Siersleben
40	MF	BRA	João Victor

=== Players out on loan ===
Note: Flags indicate national team as defined under FIFA eligibility rules; some limited exceptions apply. Players may hold more than one non-FIFA nationality.

No.	Pos.	Nation	Player
2	DF	BRA	William (at Schalke 04 until 30 June 2021)
11	MF	GER	Felix Klaus (at Fortuna Düsseldorf until 30 June 2021)
26	FW	USA	Ulysses Llanez (at Heerenveen until 30 June 2021)
29	FW	EGY	Omar Marmoush (at FC St. Pauli until 30 June 2021)
34	MF	GER	Marvin Stefaniak (at Greuther Fürth until 30 June 2021)
37	MF	GER	Elvis Rexhbeçaj (at 1. FC Köln until 30 June 2021)

== Transfers ==
=== In ===
No.	Pos	Player	Transferred from	Fee	Date	Source
21	FW	(Poland) Bartosz Białek	(Poland) Zagłębie Lubin	€5,000,000	19 August 2020	
3	DF	(France) Maxence Lacroix	(France) Sochaux	€5,000,000	25 August 2020	
20	MF	(Germany) Ridle Baku	(Germany) Mainz 05	€10,000,000	1 October 2020	
17	FW	(Germany) Maximilian Philipp	(Russia) Dynamo Moscow	Loan	2 October 2020	

=== Out ===
No.	Pos	Player	Transferred to	Fee	Date	Source
17	DF	(Germany) Felix Uduokhai	(Germany) FC Augsburg	€7,000,000	1 July 2020	
31	DF	(Germany) Robin Knoche	(Germany) Union Berlin	Free	1 July 2020	
38	MF	(Belgium) Ismail Azzaoui		Free	1 July 2020	
36	GK	(Germany) Phillip Menzel	Austria Klagenfurt	Undisclosed	1 August 2020	
4	MF	(Spain) Ignacio Camacho	Retired	N/A	14 September 2020	
17	MF	(Germany) John Yeboah	(Netherlands) Willem II	Undisclosed	15 September 2020	
32	DF	(Democratic Republic of the Congo) Marcel Tisserand	(Turkey) Fenerbahçe	€4,000,000	15 September 2020	
43	MF	(Germany) Julian Justvan	(Germany) SC Paderborn 07	Undisclosed	15 September 2020	
26	FW	(United States) Ulysses Llanez	(Netherlands) SC Heerenveen	Loan	15 September 2020	
20	DF	(Germany) Luca Horn	(Germany) Hansa Rostock	Undisclosed	29 September 2020	
29	FW	(Egypt) Omar Marmoush	(Germany) FC St. Pauli	Loan	5 January 2021	
11	MF	(Germany) Felix Klaus	(Germany) Fortuna Düsseldorf	Loan	14 January 2021	
2	DF	(Brazil) William	(Germany) Schalke 04	Loan	25 January 2021	
10	MF	(Turkey) Yunus Mallı	(Turkey) Trabzonspor	Free	31 January 2021	

== Pre-season and friendlies ==
Win Draw Loss

15 August 2020 Friendly	VfL Wolfsburg	0–1	Eintracht Braunschweig	Wolfsburg, Germany
11:00 CEST (UTC+2)		Report	Bär 46'	Stadium: AOK-Stadion; Attendance: 0 Referee: Harm Osmers

18 August 2020 Friendly	VfL Wolfsburg	2–0	1. FC Phönix Lübeck	Wolfsburg, Germany
16:00 CEST (UTC+2)	Horn 48'; Klaus 59'	Report		Stadium: AOK-Stadion; Attendance: 0

22 August 2020 Friendly	VfL Wolfsburg	2–0	Holstein Kiel	Wolfsburg, Germany
15:30 CEST (UTC+2)	Brekalo 57', 87'	Report		Stadium: AOK-Stadion; Attendance: 0 Referee: Robert Schröder

29 August 2020 Friendly	1. FC Köln	0–3	VfL Wolfsburg	Cologne, Germany
15:30 CEST (UTC+2)		Report	Lacroix (yellow card) 54'; Białek 69'; João Victor 78'; Mallı 83'	Stadium: Franz-Kremer-Stadion; Attendance: 0 Referee: Mitja Stegemann

5 September 2020 Friendly	1. FC Magdeburg	1–4	VfL Wolfsburg	Magdeburg, Germany
15:30 CEST (UTC+2)	Beck 15'	Report	Mehmedi 8', 64'; Ginczek 12' (pen.), 19'	Stadium: MDCC-Arena; Attendance: 1,098; Referee: Lasse Koslowski

14 November 2020 Friendly	Hannover 96	0–0	VfL Wolfsburg	Hanover, Germany
12:00 CET (UTC+1)	Sulejmani (yellow card) 32'; Hübers (yellow card) 57'	Report	Gerhardt (yellow card) 62'; Marmoush (yellow card) 89'	Stadium: Eilenriedestadion; Attendance: 0 Referee: Harm Osmers

== Competitions ==
=== Overview ===
Competition	First match	Last match	Starting round	Final position	Record							
Competition	First match	Last match	Starting round	Final position	Pld	W	D	L	GF	GA	GD	Win %
Bundesliga	20 September 2020	22 May 2021	Matchday 1	4th	34	17	10	7	61	37	+24	50.00
DFB-Pokal	12 September 2020	3 March 2021	First round	Quarter-finals	4	3	0	1	9	3	+6	75.00
UEFA Europa League	17 September 2020	1 October 2020	Second qualifying round	Play-off round	3	2	0	1	7	2	+5	66.67
Total					41	22	10	9	77	42	+35	53.66

Source: Soccerway

=== Bundesliga ===
==== League table ====
Pos	Team	Pld	W	D	L	GF	GA	GD	Pts	Qualification or relegation
2	RB Leipzig	34	19	8	7	60	32	+28	65	Qualification for the Champions League group stage
3	Borussia Dortmund	34	20	4	10	75	46	+29	64	Qualification for the Champions League group stage
4	VfL Wolfsburg	34	17	10	7	61	37	+24	61	Qualification for the Champions League group stage
5	Eintracht Frankfurt	34	16	12	6	69	53	+16	60	Qualification for the Europa League group stage (Note: Since the winners of the 2020–21 DFB-Pokal, Borussia Dortmund, qualified for the Champions League based on league position, the Europa League group stage spot was passed to the sixth-placed team, and the Europa Conference League play-off round spot was passed to the seventh-placed team.)
6	Bayer Leverkusen	34	14	10	10	53	39	+14	52	Qualification for the Europa League group stage

Source: DFB
Rules for classification: 1) Points; 2) Goal difference; 3) Goals scored; 4) Head-to-head results; 5) Head-to-head away goals scored; 6) Away goals scored; 7) Play-off.

==== Results summary ====
Overall								Home						Away					
Pld	W	D	L	GF	GA	GD	Pts	W	D	L	GF	GA	GD	W	D	L	GF	GA	GD
34	17	10	7	61	37	+24	61	10	4	3	32	16	+16	7	6	4	29	21	+8

Source: DFB

==== Results by round ====
Round	1	2	3	4	5	6	7	8	9	10	11	12	13	14	15	16	17	18	19	20	21	22	23	24	25	26	27	28	29	30	31	32	33	34
Ground	H	A	H	A	H	A	H	A	H	A	H	A	H	A	A	H	A	A	H	A	H	A	H	A	H	A	H	A	H	A	H	H	A	H
Result	D	D	D	D	W	D	W	W	W	D	W	L	W	L	D	D	W	W	W	W	D	W	W	L	W	W	W	L	L	W	L	W	D	L
Position	10	12	15	13	10	11	6	6	5	5	4	5	4	6	6	6	5	4	3	3	4	3	3	3	3	3	3	3	3	3	3	3	4	4

Source: DFB
A = Away; H = Home; W = Win; D = Draw; L = Loss

==== Matches ====
The league fixtures were announced on 7 August 2020.

20 September 2020 1	VfL Wolfsburg	0–0	Bayer Leverkusen	Wolfsburg
18:00 CEST (UTC+2)	Schlager (yellow card) 43'	Report	Aránguiz (yellow card) 33'; Baumgartlinger (yellow card) 90+2'	Stadium: Volkswagen Arena; Attendance: 500; Referee: Sven Jablonski

27 September 2020 2	SC Freiburg	1–1	VfL Wolfsburg	Freiburg
18:00 CEST (UTC+2)	Petersen 11'	Report	Paulo Otávio (yellow card) 32'; Arnold (yellow card) 34'; Brooks (yellow card) 34'; Brekalo 42'	Stadium: Schwarzwald-Stadion; Attendance: 3,200; Referee: Sören Storks

4 October 2020 3	VfL Wolfsburg	0–0	FC Augsburg	Wolfsburg
15:30 CEST (UTC+2)		Report	Gouweleeuw (yellow card) 90+4'	Stadium: Volkswagen Arena; Attendance: 4,632; Referee: Felix Zwayer

17 October 2020 4	Borussia Mönchengladbach	1–1	VfL Wolfsburg	Mönchengladbach
20:30 CEST (UTC+2)	Neuhaus (yellow card) 77'; Hofmann 78' (pen.); Herrmann (yellow card) 90'	Report	Schlager (yellow card) 22'; Guilavogui (yellow card) 77'; Weghorst 85'	Stadium: Borussia-Park; Attendance: 300; Referee: Daniel Schlager

25 October 2020 5	VfL Wolfsburg	2–1	Arminia Bielefeld	Wolfsburg
15:30 CET (UTC+1)	Weghorst 19'; Arnold 20', (yellow card) 49'; Philipp (yellow card) 78'	Report	Klos (yellow card) 10'; Schipplock 80'	Stadium: Volkswagen Arena; Attendance: 4,519; Referee: Manuel Gräfe

1 November 2020 6	Hertha BSC	1–1	VfL Wolfsburg	Berlin
18:00 CET (UTC+1)	Cunha 6'; Plattenhardt (yellow card) 76'; Pekarík (yellow card) 86'; Guendouzi (yellow card) 90+2'	Report	Baku 20'; Gerhardt (yellow card) 90+1'	Stadium: Olympiastadion; Attendance: 0 Referee: Martin Petersen

8 November 2020 7	VfL Wolfsburg	2–1	1899 Hoffenheim	Wolfsburg
15:30 CET (UTC+1)	Steffen 5'; Weghorst 26', (penalty missed) 84'; Brooks (yellow card) 48'	Report	Baumgartner (yellow card) 30'; Rudy (yellow card) 45+3'; Vogt (yellow card) 82'; Adamyan 88'; Dabbur (penalty missed) 90+4'	Stadium: Volkswagen Arena; Attendance: 0 Referee: Sven Jablonski

21 November 2020 8	Schalke 04	0–2	VfL Wolfsburg	Gelsenkirchen
15:30 CET (UTC+1)		Report	Weghorst 3'; Schlager 24', (yellow card) 86'	Stadium: Veltins-Arena; Attendance: 0 Referee: Marco Fritz

27 November 2020 9	VfL Wolfsburg	5–3	Werder Bremen	Wolfsburg
20:30 CET (UTC+1)	Baku 22'; Brooks 25'; Weghorst 37', 76'; Lacroix (yellow card) 73'; Arnold (yellow card) 81'; Białek 90+5'	Report	Bittencourt 13'; Mbom (yellow card) 24'; Möhwald 36', (yellow card) 57' (yellow-red card) 80'; Brooks 47' (o.g.)	Stadium: Volkswagen Arena; Attendance: 0 Referee: Christian Dingert

5 December 2020 10	1. FC Köln	2–2	VfL Wolfsburg	Cologne
15:30 CET (UTC+1)	Thielmann 18'; Duda 43'	Report	Arnold 29'; Weghorst 47'; Paulo Otávio (yellow card) 90+1'	Stadium: RheinEnergieStadion; Attendance: 0 Referee: Sven Jablonski

11 December 2020 11	VfL Wolfsburg	2–1	Eintracht Frankfurt	Wolfsburg
20:30 CET (UTC+1)	Lacroix (yellow card) 42'; Brekalo (yellow card) 59'; Brooks (yellow card) 62'; Weghorst 76' (pen.), 88', (yellow card) 87'; Schlager (yellow card) 82'	Report	Ndicka (yellow card) 15'; Dost 62' (pen.), (yellow card) 90+3'	Stadium: Volkswagen Arena; Attendance: 0 Referee: Markus Schmidt

16 December 2020 12	Bayern Munich	2–1	VfL Wolfsburg	Munich
20:30 CET (UTC+1)	Lewandowski 45+1', 50'; Gnabry (yellow card) 69'; Sané (yellow card) 84'; Coman (yellow card) 90'	Report	Philipp 5'; Arnold (yellow card) 34'	Stadium: Allianz Arena; Attendance: 0 Referee: Marco Fritz

20 December 2020 13	VfL Wolfsburg	1–0	VfB Stuttgart	Wolfsburg
18:00 CET (UTC+1)	Brekalo 49'; Steffen (yellow card) 76'; Gerhardt (yellow card) 90+2'	Report	González (yellow card) 20'; Anton (yellow card) 48'; Mangala (yellow card) 86'	Stadium: Volkswagen Arena; Attendance: 0 Referee: Florian Badstübner

3 January 2021 14	Borussia Dortmund	2–0	VfL Wolfsburg	Dortmund
15:30 CET (UTC+1)	Hummels (yellow card) 25'; Delaney (yellow card) 40'; Akanji 66'; Haaland (yellow card) 80'; Sancho 90+1'	Report	Steffen (yellow card) 38'	Stadium: Signal Iduna Park; Attendance: 0 Referee: Manuel Gräfe

9 January 2021 15	Union Berlin	2–2	VfL Wolfsburg	Berlin
15:30 CET (UTC+1)	Becker 29'; Andrich 52'; Ingvartsen (yellow card) 65'; Hübner (yellow card) 70'; Knoche (yellow card) 90+1'	Report	Steffen 10'; Arnold (red card) 50'; Weghorst (yellow card) 57', (goal) 65' (pen.)	Stadium: Stadion An der Alten Försterei; Attendance: 0 Referee: Patrick Ittrich

16 January 2021 16	VfL Wolfsburg	2–2	RB Leipzig	Wolfsburg
15:30 CET (UTC+1)	Weghorst 22', (yellow card) 59'; Steffen 35'; Paulo Otávio (yellow card) 48'; Mbabu (yellow card) 50'; Lacroix (yellow card) 81'	Report	Mukiele 5', (yellow card) 42'; Orbán 54'; Kampl (yellow card) 71'; Angeliño (yellow card) 90+1'	Stadium: Volkswagen Arena; Attendance: 0 Referee: Tobias Stieler

19 January 2021 17	Mainz 05	0–2	VfL Wolfsburg	Mainz
20:30 CET (UTC+1)	Boëtius (yellow card) 57'	Report	Philipp (yellow card) 53'; Białek 65'; Weghorst 79'; Guilavogui (yellow card) 90+2'	Stadium: Opel Arena; Attendance: 0 Referee: Sören Storks

23 January 2021 18	Bayer Leverkusen	0–1	VfL Wolfsburg	Leverkusen
15:30 CET (UTC+1)	Alario (yellow card) 90+2'	Report	Baku 35'; Lacroix (yellow card) 90+3'	Stadium: BayArena; Attendance: 0 Referee: Marco Fritz

31 January 2021 19	VfL Wolfsburg	3–0	SC Freiburg	Wolfsburg
18:00 CET (UTC+1)	Brooks 21'; Weghorst 39'; Gerhardt 86'	Report		Stadium: Volkswagen Arena; Attendance: 0 Referee: Tobias Reichel

6 February 2021 20	FC Augsburg	0–2	VfL Wolfsburg	Augsburg
15:30 CET (UTC+1)	Bénes (yellow card) 40'; Gumny (yellow card) 52'	Report	Weghorst 38'; Baku 59'	Stadium: WWK Arena; Attendance: 0 Referee: Robert Hartmann

14 February 2021 21	VfL Wolfsburg	0–0	Borussia Mönchengladbach	Wolfsburg
18:00 CET (UTC+1)	Brooks (yellow card) 11'	Report	Bensebaini (yellow card) 7'; Pléa (yellow card) 79'; Embolo (yellow card) 85'	Stadium: Volkswagen Arena; Attendance: 0 Referee: Tobias Stieler

19 February 2021 22	Arminia Bielefeld	0–3	VfL Wolfsburg	Bielefeld
20:30 CET (UTC+1)		Report	Steffen 29', 47'; Brooks (yellow card) 37'; Arnold 54'; Guilavogui (yellow card) 80'	Stadium: Bielefelder Alm; Attendance: 0 Referee: Felix Brych

27 February 2021 23	VfL Wolfsburg	2–0	Hertha BSC	Wolfsburg
15:30 CET (UTC+1)	Klünter 38' (o.g.); Paulo Otávio (yellow card) 45'; Mbabu (yellow card) 47'; Pongračić (yellow card) 48' (yellow-red card) 90+4'; Lacroix 89'; Białek (yellow card) 90+5'	Report		Stadium: Volkswagen Arena; Attendance: 0 Referee: Bastian Dankert

6 March 2021 24	1899 Hoffenheim	2–1	VfL Wolfsburg	Sinsheim
15:30 CET (UTC+1)	Baumgartner 8'; Kramarić 41'; Sessegnon (yellow card) 70'; Dabbur (yellow card) 80'	Report	Weghorst 23'; Steffen (yellow card) 30'; Lacroix (yellow card) 65'; Schlager (yellow card) 72'; Paulo Otávio (yellow card) 88', (red card) 90+4'	Stadium: Rhein-Neckar-Arena; Attendance: 0 Referee: Markus Schmidt

13 March 2021 25	VfL Wolfsburg	5–0	Schalke 04	Wolfsburg
15:30 CET (UTC+1)	Mustafi 32' (o.g.); Weghorst 51'; Baku 58'; Brekalo 64'; Philipp 79'	Report	William (yellow card) 55'	Stadium: Volkswagen Arena; Attendance: 0 Referee: Sören Storks

20 March 2021 26	Werder Bremen	1–2	VfL Wolfsburg	Bremen
15:30 CET (UTC+1)	Möhwald 45'; Sargent (yellow card) 57'; Füllkrug (yellow card) 90+1'; Bittencourt (yellow card) 90+3'	Report	Sargent 9' (o.g.); Weghorst 42'; Schlager (yellow card) 81'	Stadium: Weser-Stadion; Attendance: 0 Referee: Robert Schröder

3 April 2021 27	VfL Wolfsburg	1–0	1. FC Köln	Wolfsburg
15:30 CEST (UTC+2)	Mbabu (yellow card) 22'; Gerhardt (yellow card) 63'; Brekalo 69'	Report	Kainz (yellow card) 90+3'	Stadium: Volkswagen Arena; Attendance: 0 Referee: Robert Hartmann

10 April 2021 28	Eintracht Frankfurt	4–3	VfL Wolfsburg	Frankfurt
15:30 CEST (UTC+2)	Kamada 8', (yellow card) 45+1'; Jović 27'; Ndicka (yellow card) 35'; Silva 54'; Durm 61'; Rode (yellow card) 83'	Report	Baku 6'; Weghorst 46'; Mbabu (yellow card) 74'; Tuta 85' (o.g.); Arnold (yellow card) 90+4'	Stadium: Deutsche Bank Park; Attendance: 0 Referee: Marco Fritz

17 April 2021 29	VfL Wolfsburg	2–3	Bayern Munich	Wolfsburg
15:30 CEST (UTC+2)	Weghorst 35'; Philipp 54'; Paulo Otávio (yellow card) 57'; Mbabu (yellow card) 86'	Report	Musiala 15', 37'; Choupo-Moting 24'; Hernandez (yellow card) 79'	Stadium: Volkswagen Arena; Attendance: 0 Referee: Felix Zwayer

21 April 2021 30	VfB Stuttgart	1–3	VfL Wolfsburg	Stuttgart
20:30 CEST (UTC+2)	Förster (penalty missed) 27'; Ahamada (yellow card) 63'; Castro (yellow card) 77', (goal) 90+2'; Cissé (yellow card) 86'	Report	Schlager 13'; Weghorst 29'; Gerhardt 65'	Stadium: Mercedes-Benz Arena; Attendance: 0 Referee: Felix Brych

24 April 2021 31	VfL Wolfsburg	0–2	Borussia Dortmund	Wolfsburg
15:30 CEST (UTC+2)	Paulo Otávio (yellow card) 72'	Report	Haaland 12', 68'; Bellingham (yellow card) 13' (yellow-red card) 59'; Meunier (yellow card) 88'	Stadium: Volkswagen Arena; Attendance: 0 Referee: Tobias Stieler

8 May 2021 32	VfL Wolfsburg	3–0	Union Berlin	Wolfsburg
15:30 CEST (UTC+2)	Brekalo 12', 63', 90'; Mbabu (yellow card) 31'	Report		Stadium: Volkswagen Arena; Attendance: 0 Referee: Sven Jablonski

16 May 2021 33	RB Leipzig	2–2	VfL Wolfsburg	Leipzig
20:30 CEST (UTC+2)	Henrichs (yellow card) 20'; Konaté (yellow card) 36'; Sabitzer (yellow card) 45', (goal) 78' (pen.); Kluivert 51'	Report	Philipp 12', 45+1'; Mbabu (yellow card) 52'; Arnold (yellow card) 60'; Baku (yellow card) 86'	Stadium: Red Bull Arena; Attendance: 0 Referee: Felix Zwayer

22 May 2021 34	VfL Wolfsburg	2–3	Mainz 05	Wolfsburg
15:30 CEST (UTC+2)	Philipp 47', (yellow card) 75'; Arnold (yellow card) 51'; Schlager (yellow card) 56'; João Victor 66'	Report	Barreiro (yellow card) 29'; Bell (yellow card) 40', (goal) 77'; Boëtius 44', (yellow card) 61'; Quaison 54'	Stadium: Volkswagen Arena; Attendance: 0 Referee: Bastian Dankert

=== DFB-Pokal ===
12 September 2020 First round	Union Fürstenwalde	1–4	VfL Wolfsburg	Wolfsburg
15:30 CEST (UTC+2)	Geurts 9' (pen.)	Report	João Victor 24', 29'; Gerhardt 60'; Otávio (yellow card) 75'; Guilavogui 77'	Stadium: AOK-Stadion; Attendance: 0 Referee: Robert Schröder

23 December 2020 Second round	VfL Wolfsburg	4–0	SV Sandhausen	Wolfsburg
18:30 CET (UTC+1)	Bruma (yellow card) 26'; Gerhardt 27'; Weghorst 29', 90+1'; João Victor 41'; Baku (yellow card) 84'	Report	Contento (yellow card) 23'; Nartey (yellow card) 52'; Esswein (yellow card) 57'	Stadium: Volkswagen Arena; Attendance: 0 Referee: Guido Winkmann

3 February 2021 Round of 16	VfL Wolfsburg	1–0	Schalke 04	Wolfsburg
18:30 CET (UTC+1)	Brooks (yellow card) 28'; Weghorst (penalty missed) 40', 40'; Paulo Otávio (yellow card) 61'	Report	Thiaw (yellow card) 29'; William (yellow card) 76'	Stadium: Volkswagen Arena; Attendance: 0 Referee: Felix Zwayer

3 March 2021 Quarter-finals	RB Leipzig	2–0	VfL Wolfsburg	Leipzig
20:45 CET (UTC+1)	Kampl (yellow card) 20'; Olmo (yellow card) 21'; Nkunku (yellow card) 25'; Poulsen 68'; Hwang 88'	Report	Paulo Otávio (yellow card) 5'; Weghorst (penalty missed) 26'; Lacroix (yellow card) 35'	Stadium: Red Bull Arena; Attendance: 0 Referee: Marco Fritz

=== UEFA Europa League ===
17 September 2020 Second qualifying round	Kukësi (Albania)	0–4	(Germany) VfL Wolfsburg	Tirana, Albania
20:00 CEST (UTC+2)	Demiri (yellow card) 32'; Rroca (penalty missed) 35'; Horić (yellow card) 55'	Report	Weghorst 21', 74'; Paulo Otávio (yellow card) 28'; Lacroix 33', (yellow card) 38'; Klaus (yellow card) 34'; Steffen (yellow card) 44'; Mehmedi (yellow card) 65', (goal) 89'	Stadium: Arena Kombëtare; Attendance: 0 Referee: Duje Strukan (Croatia)

24 September 2020 Third qualifying round	VfL Wolfsburg (Germany)	2–0	(Ukraine) Desna Chernihiv	Wolfsburg, Germany
20:15 CEST (UTC+2)	Guilavogui 16'; Marmoush (yellow card) 50'; Ginczek 90+2'	Report	Tamm (yellow card) 57' (yellow-red card) 60'; Konoplya (yellow card) 66'; Ohirya (yellow card) 70'; Totovytskyi (yellow card) 88'	Stadium: AOK-Stadion; Attendance: 0 Referee: Lawrence Visser (Belgium)

1 October 2020 Play-off round	AEK Athens (Greece)	2–1	(Germany) VfL Wolfsburg	Athens, Greece
20:45 (21:45 EEST)	Insúa (yellow card) 16'; Mantalos (penalty missed) 20'; Simões 64', (yellow card) 89'; Ansarifard 90+4'; Livaja (yellow card) 90+5'	Report	Schlager (yellow card) 19'; Lacroix (yellow card) 22'; Mehmedi 45+1'	Stadium: Olympic Stadium; Attendance: 0 Referee: Artur Soares Dias (Portugal)

== Statistics ==
=== Appearances and goals ===
No.	Pos	Nat	Player	Total		Bundesliga		DFB-Pokal		Europa League	
No.	Pos	Nat	Player	Apps	Goals	Apps	Goals	Apps	Goals	Apps	Goals
Goalkeepers
1	GK	(Belgium) BEL	Koen Casteels	37	0	32	0	3	0	2	0
12	GK	(Austria) AUT	Pavao Pervan	4	0	2	0	1	0	1	0
30	GK	(Germany) GER	Niklas Klinger	0	0	0	0	0	0	0	0
35	GK	(Germany) GER	Lino Kasten	0	0	0	0	0	0	0	0
Defenders
4	DF	(France) FRA	Maxence Lacroix	36	2	29+1	1	3	0	3	1
5	DF	(Netherlands) NED	Jeffrey Bruma	1	0	0	0	1	0	0	0
6	DF	(Brazil) BRA	Paulo Otávio	30	0	19+4	0	4	0	2+1	0
15	DF	(France) FRA	Jérôme Roussillon	23	0	14+6	0	0	0	2+1	0
19	DF	(Switzerland) SUI	Kevin Mbabu	24	0	19+3	0	2	0	0	0
25	DF	(United States) USA	John Brooks	35	2	31+1	2	2	0	0+1	0
34	DF	(Croatia) CRO	Marin Pongračić	11	0	7+3	0	1	0	0	0
39	DF	(Germany) GER	Tim Siersleben	1	0	0+1	0	0	0	0	0
Midfielders
7	MF	(Croatia) CRO	Josip Brekalo	33	7	22+7	7	0+2	0	2	0
8	MF	(Switzerland) SUI	Renato Steffen	28	5	19+2	5	4	0	3	0
11	MF	(Germany) GER	Felix Klaus	8	0	1+5	0	1	0	1	0
14	MF	(Switzerland) SUI	Admir Mehmedi	22	2	8+10	0	1	0	3	2
20	MF	(Germany) GER	Ridle Baku	35	6	31+1	6	3	0	0	0
23	MF	(France) FRA	Josuha Guilavogui	26	2	7+13	0	2+1	1	3	1
24	MF	(Austria) AUT	Xaver Schlager	38	2	30+2	2	2+1	0	3	0
27	MF	(Germany) GER	Maximilian Arnold	36	3	30	3	3	0	3	0
31	MF	(Germany) GER	Yannick Gerhardt	35	4	21+8	2	4	2	0+2	0
40	MF	(Brazil) BRA	João Victor	27	4	3+18	1	2+2	3	1+1	0
Forwards
9	FW	(Netherlands) NED	Wout Weghorst	41	25	33+1	20	4	3	3	2
17	FW	(Germany) GER	Maximilian Philipp	26	6	13+11	6	0+2	0	0	0
21	FW	(Poland) POL	Bartosz Białek	24	2	1+18	2	0+4	0	0+1	0
33	FW	(Germany) GER	Daniel Ginczek	14	1	1+10	0	1+1	0	0+1	1
Players transferred out during the season
2	DF	(Brazil) BRA	William	2	0	0+2	0	0	0	0	0
10	MF	(Turkey) TUR	Yunus Mallı	2	0	1	0	0+1	0	0	0
11	MF	(Germany) GER	Felix Klaus	8	0	1+5	0	1	0	1	0
20	DF	(Germany) GER	Luca Horn	1	0	0	0	0+1	0	0	0
29	FW	(Egypt) EGY	Omar Marmoush	4	0	0+1	0	0+2	0	1	0

Last updated: 22 May 2021
Source: Competitions

=== Goalscorers ===
As of 22 May 2021

Rank	No.	Pos	Nat	Name	Bundesliga	DFB-Pokal	Europa League	Total
1	9	FW	(Netherlands)	Wout Weghorst	20	3	2	25
2	7	MF	(Croatia)	Josip Brekalo	7	0	0	7
3	17	FW	(Germany)	Maximilian Philipp	6	0	0	5
3	20	MF	(Germany)	Ridle Baku	6	0	0	6
5	8	MF	(Switzerland)	Renato Steffen	5	0	0	5
6	31	MF	(Germany)	Yannick Gerhardt	2	2	0	4
6	40	MF	(Brazil)	João Victor	1	3	0	4
8	27	MF	(Germany)	Maximilian Arnold	3	0	0	3
9	4	DF	(France)	Maxence Lacroix	1	0	1	2
9	14	MF	(Switzerland)	Admir Mehmedi	0	0	2	2
9	21	FW	(Poland)	Bartosz Białek	1	1	0	2
9	23	MF	(France)	Josuha Guilavogui	0	1	1	2
9	24	MF	(Austria)	Xaver Schlager	2	0	0	2
9	25	DF	(United States)	John Brooks	2	0	0	2
15	33	FW	(Germany)	Daniel Ginczek	0	0	1	1
Own goals					4	0	0	3
Totals					59	10	7	76
