= 2021–22 VfL Wolfsburg season =

VfL Wolfsburg
2021–22 season
- Owner: Volkswagen AG (of GmbH)
- Executive Director: Frank Witter
- Head coach: Mark van Bommel (until 24 October); Florian Kohfeldt (from 26 October)
- Stadium: Volkswagen Arena
- Bundesliga: 12th
- DFB-Pokal: First round
- UEFA Champions League: Group stage
- Top goalscorer: League: Lukas Nmecha (8); All: Lukas Nmecha (10)
Home colours	Away colours	Third colours

The 2021–22 season was the 77th season in the existence of VfL Wolfsburg and the club's 25th consecutive season in the top flight of German football. In addition to the domestic league, VfL Wolfsburg participated in this season's editions of the DFB-Pokal and the UEFA Champions League, after finishing fourth in the previous Bundesliga season.

== Players ==
=== First-team squad ===
As of 30 January 2022

Note: Flags indicate national team as defined under FIFA eligibility rules; some limited exceptions apply. Players may hold more than one non-FIFA nationality.

No.	Pos.	Nation	Player
1	GK	BEL	Koen Casteels (captain)
2	DF	BRA	William
3	DF	BEL	Sebastiaan Bornauw
4	DF	FRA	Maxence Lacroix
5	DF	NED	Micky van de Ven
6	DF	BRA	Paulo Otávio
7	FW	GER	Luca Waldschmidt
8	MF	BEL	Aster Vranckx
9	FW	GER	Max Kruse
10	FW	GER	Lukas Nmecha
11	MF	SUI	Renato Steffen
12	GK	AUT	Pavao Pervan
15	DF	FRA	Jérôme Roussillon
17	FW	GER	Maximilian Philipp

No.	Pos.	Nation	Player
18	DF	IRL	Anselmo García McNulty
19	DF	SUI	Kevin Mbabu
20	MF	GER	Ridle Baku
21	FW	POL	Bartosz Białek
22	MF	ENG	Felix Nmecha
23	FW	DEN	Jonas Wind
24	MF	AUT	Xaver Schlager
25	DF	USA	John Brooks
27	MF	GER	Maximilian Arnold (vice-captain)
28	FW	BEL	Dodi Lukebakio (on loan from Hertha BSC)
30	GK	GER	Niklas Klinger
31	MF	GER	Yannick Gerhardt
35	GK	GER	Philipp Schulze
40	DF	USA	Kevin Paredes

=== Players out on loan ===
Note: Flags indicate national team as defined under FIFA eligibility rules; some limited exceptions apply. Players may hold more than one non-FIFA nationality.

No.	Pos.	Nation	Player
—	FW	KOR	Hong Yun-sang (on loan at SKN St. Pölten until 29 June 2022)
—	MF	USA	Bryang Kayo (on loan at Nürnberg II until 30 June 2022)
7	MF	CRO	Josip Brekalo (on loan at Torino until 30 June 2022)
23	MF	FRA	Josuha Guilavogui (on loan at Bordeaux until 30 June 2022)
26	FW	USA	Ulysses Llanez (on loan at SKN St. Pölten until 30 June 2022)
29	FW	EGY	Omar Marmoush (on loan at VfB Stuttgart until 30 June 2022)
34	DF	CRO	Marin Pongračić (on loan at Borussia Dortmund until 30 June 2022)
35	GK	GER	Lino Kasten (on loan at SKN St. Pölten until 30 June 2022)
37	MF	GER	Elvis Rexhbeçaj (on loan at VfL Bochum until 30 June 2022)
39	DF	GER	Tim Siersleben (on loan at 1. FC Heidenheim until 30 June 2023)

== Transfers ==
=== In ===
No.	Pos	Player	Transferred from	Fee	Date	Source
8	MF	(Belgium) Aster Vranckx	(Belgium) Mechelen	€8,000,000	1 July 2021	
17	FW	(Germany) Maximilian Philipp	(Russia) Dynamo Moscow	€7,500,000	1 July 2021	
3	DF	(Belgium) Sebastiaan Bornauw	(Germany) 1. FC Köln	€13,500,000	16 July 2021	
10	FW	(Germany) Lukas Nmecha	(England) Manchester City	€8,000,000	16 July 2021	
22	MF	(England) Felix Nmecha	Free transfer		21 July 2021	
7	FW	(Germany) Luca Waldschmidt	(Portugal) Benfica	€12,000,000	22 August 2021	
28	FW	(Belgium) Dodi Lukebakio	(Germany) Hertha BSC	Loan	30 August 2021	
5	DF	(Netherlands) Micky van de Ven	(Netherlands) Volendam	€3,500,000	31 August 2021	
40	DF	(United States) Kevin Paredes	(United States) D.C. United	€6,300,000	28 January 2022	
9	FW	(Germany) Max Kruse	(Germany) Union Berlin	€5,000,000	30 January 2022	
23	FW	(Denmark) Jonas Wind	(Denmark) Copenhagen	€12,000,000	31 January 2022	

=== Out ===
No.	Pos	Player	Transferred to	Fee	Date	Source
5	DF	(Netherlands) Jeffrey Bruma	Free transfer		1 July 2021	
11	MF	(Germany) Felix Klaus	(Germany) Fortuna Düsseldorf	€1,100,000	1 July 2021	
39	DF	(Germany) Tim Siersleben	(Germany) 1. FC Heidenheim	Loan	1 July 2021	
	FW	(South Korea) Yun-sang Hong	(Austria) SKN St. Pölten	Loan	9 July 2021	
26	FW	(United States) Ulysses Llanez	(Austria) SKN St. Pölten	Loan	9 July 2021	
35	GK	(Germany) Lino Kasten	(Austria) SKN St. Pölten	Loan	9 July 2021	
	MF	(United States) Bryang Kayo	(Germany) Viktoria Berlin	Loan	30 July 2021	
37	MF	(Germany) Elvis Rexhbeçaj	(Germany) VfL Bochum	Loan	2 August 2021	
40	MF	(Brazil) João Victor	(United Arab Emirates) Al Jazira	Undisclosed	17 August 2021	
29	FW	(Egypt) Omar Marmoush	(Germany) VfB Stuttgart	Loan	30 August 2021	
42	MF	(Germany) Dominik Marx	Free transfer		30 August 2021	
43	DF	(Germany) Marcel Beifus	(Germany) FC St. Pauli	€100,000	30 August 2021	
7	MF	(Croatia) Josip Brekalo	(Italy) Torino	Loan	31 August 2021	
34	DF	(Croatia) Marin Pongračić	(Germany) Borussia Dortmund	Loan	31 August 2021	
41	MF	(United States) Kobe Hernandez-Foster	Mutual contract termination		1 September 2021	
38	DF	(Germany) Jannis Lang	(Germany) Erzgebirge Aue	Undisclosed	13 January 2022	
14	MF	(Switzerland) Admir Mehmedi	(Turkey) Antalyaspor	Undisclosed	16 January 2022	
44	MF	(Germany) Marvin Stefaniak	(Germany) Würzburger Kickers	Mutual contract termination	17 January 2022	
33	FW	(Germany) Daniel Ginczek	(Germany) Fortuna Düsseldorf	Undisclosed	29 January 2022	
23	MF	(France) Joshua Guilavogui	(France) Bordeaux	Loan	30 January 2022	
9	FW	(Netherlands) Wout Weghorst	(England) Burnley	€14,000,000	31 January 2022	
	MF	(United States) Bryang Kayo	(Germany) Nürnberg II	Loan	31 January 2022	

== Pre-season and friendlies ==
Win Draw Loss

6 July 2021 Friendly	VfL Wolfsburg	2–1	Erzgebirge Aue	Wolfsburg, Germany
16:00 CEST (UTC+2)	Meier 56'; Busch 77'	Report	Messeguem 87'	Stadium: AOK Stadion; Attendance: 390; Referee: Robert Schröder

10 July 2021 Friendly	VfL Wolfsburg	0–3	Hansa Rostock	Wolfsburg, Germany
16:00 CEST (UTC+2)		Report	Munsy 31'; Mamba 71', 88'	Stadium: AOK Stadion; Attendance: 500; Referee: Felix Bickel

14 July 2021 Friendly	VfL Wolfsburg	0–1	Holstein Kiel	Wolfsburg, Germany
16:00 CEST (UTC+2)	Pongračić (yellow card)	Report	Mühling 60'	Stadium: AOK Stadion; Attendance: 399; Referee: Robert Schröder

17 July 2021 Friendly	Lyon	4–1	VfL Wolfsburg	Lyon, France
21:00 CEST (UTC+2)	Toko Ekambi 7', 55'; Dembélé 28'; Bonnet (yellow card) 80'; Wissa 82' (pen.)	Report	Ginczek 29'; Gerhardt (yellow card) 31'; Otávio (yellow card) 62'	Stadium: Groupama Stadium; Attendance: 8,000; Referee: Romain Lissorgue

24 July 2021 Friendly	VfL Wolfsburg	1–2	Monaco	Premstätten, Austria
16:00 CEST (UTC+2)	Gerhardt 39'	Report	Bornauw 65' (o.g.); Golovin 68'	Stadium: Sportpark Premstätten

31 July 2021 Friendly	VfL Wolfsburg	1–2	Atlético Madrid	Wolfsburg, Germany
18:00 CEST (UTC+2)	Weghorst 39'; Mbabu (yellow card) 84'	Report	Simeone (yellow card) 33'; Garcés 69'; Arias (yellow card) 84'; Ricard 85', (yellow card) 89'	Stadium: AOK Stadion; Attendance: 1,750; Referee: Harm Osmers

1 September 2021 Friendly	VfL Wolfsburg	3–3	Hannover 96	Wolfsburg, Germany
12:00 CEST (UTC+2)	Ginczek 26', 32'; L. Nmecha 85'	Report	Ernst 13'; Kerk 57', 68' (pen.)	Stadium: Volkswagen Arena; Referee: Robert Schröder

6 October 2021 Friendly	VfL Wolfsburg	4–1	Hamburger SV	Wolfsburg, Germany
13:00 CEST (UTC+2)	L. Nmecha 15', 30', 60'; Arnold 43'	Report	Meißner (yellow card) 13'; Suhonen 54'; Jatta (penalty missed) 80'	Stadium: AOK Stadion; Referee: Robert Schröder

10 November 2021 Friendly	VfL Wolfsburg	1–3	Hansa Rostock	Wolfsburg, Germany
13:00 CET (UTC+1)	Lukebakio 85'	Report	Duljević 17'; Mamba 60'; Martens 79'	Stadium: AOK Stadion; Attendance: 80; Referee: Rene Dose

4 January 2022 Friendly	VfL Wolfsburg	5–4	SC Paderborn	Wolfsburg, Germany
14:00 CET (UTC+1)	Weghorst 10', 25', 29'; Philipp 22'; Steffen 49'	Report	Platte 34'; Michel 37' (pen.); Yalçın 58'; Pröger 81'	Stadium: AOK Stadion; Attendance: 0 Referee: Robert Schröder

== Competitions ==
=== Overall record ===
Competition	First match	Last match	Starting round	Final position	Record							
Competition	First match	Last match	Starting round	Final position	Pld	W	D	L	GF	GA	GD	Win %
Bundesliga	14 August 2021	14 May 2022	Matchday 1	12th	34	12	6	16	43	54	−11	35.29
DFB-Pokal	8 August 2021		First round	First round	1	0	0	1	0	2	−2	0.00
UEFA Champions League	14 September 2021	8 December 2021	Group stage	Group stage	6	1	2	3	5	10	−5	16.67
Total					41	13	8	20	48	66	−18	31.71

Source: Soccerway

=== Bundesliga ===
==== League table ====
Pos	Team	Pld	W	D	L	GF	GA	GD	Pts	Qualification or relegation
10	Borussia Mönchengladbach	34	12	9	13	54	61	−7	45	
11	Eintracht Frankfurt	34	10	12	12	45	49	−4	42	Qualification for the Champions League group stage (Note: Eintracht Frankfurt qualified for the Champions League group stage by winning the UEFA Europa League.)
12	VfL Wolfsburg	34	12	6	16	43	54	−11	42	
13	VfL Bochum	34	12	6	16	38	52	−14	42	
14	FC Augsburg	34	10	8	16	39	56	−17	38	

Source: DFB
Rules for classification: 1) Points; 2) Goal difference; 3) Goals scored; 4) Head-to-head results; 5) Head-to-head away goals scored; 6) Away goals scored; 7) Play-off.

==== Results summary ====
Overall								Home						Away					
Pld	W	D	L	GF	GA	GD	Pts	W	D	L	GF	GA	GD	W	D	L	GF	GA	GD
34	12	6	16	43	54	−11	42	7	3	7	25	21	+4	5	3	9	18	33	−15

Source: DFB

==== Results by round ====
Round	1	2	3	4	5	6	7	8	9	10	11	12	13	14	15	16	17	18	19	20	21	22	23	24	25	26	27	28	29	30	31	32	33	34
Ground	H	A	H	A	H	A	H	A	H	A	H	A	H	A	H	H	A	A	H	A	H	A	H	A	H	A	H	A	H	A	H	A	A	H
Result	W	W	W	W	D	L	L	L	L	W	W	D	L	L	L	L	L	L	D	L	W	W	L	D	W	L	L	L	W	L	W	D	W	D
Position	5	1	1	1	2	3	5	6	9	7	4	6	7	8	11	11	13	14	14	15	12	12	12	12	12	12	13	14	13	13	12	13	13	12

Source: DFB
A = Away; H = Home; W = Win; D = Draw; L = Loss

==== Matches ====
The league fixtures were announced on 25 June 2021.

14 August 2021 1	VfL Wolfsburg	1–0	VfL Bochum	Wolfsburg
15:30 CEST (UTC+2)	Weghorst (penalty missed) 5', 22'	Report	Tesche (red card) 4'; Leitsch (yellow card) 29'; Rexhbeçaj (yellow card) 88'	Stadium: Volkswagen Arena; Attendance: 8,536; Referee: Frank Willenborg

21 August 2021 2	Hertha BSC	1–2	VfL Wolfsburg	Berlin
15:30 CEST (UTC+2)	Boateng (yellow card) 29'; Lukebakio 60' (pen.)	Report	Mbabu (yellow card) 31'; Roussillon (yellow card) 73'; Baku 74'; L. Nmecha 88'	Stadium: Olympiastadion; Attendance: 18,241; Referee: Matthias Jöllenbeck

29 August 2021 3	VfL Wolfsburg	1–0	RB Leipzig	Wolfsburg
17:30 CEST (UTC+2)	Steffen (yellow card) 35'; Roussillon 52', (yellow card) 89'; Schlager (yellow card) 65'; Guilavogui (yellow card) 70'	Report	Gvardiol (yellow card) 26'; Adams (yellow card) 35'	Stadium: Volkswagen Arena; Attendance: 12,058; Referee: Tobias Stieler

11 September 2021 4	Greuther Fürth	0–2	VfL Wolfsburg	Fürth
15:30 CEST (UTC+2)	Seguin (yellow card) 41'; Griesbeck (yellow card) 90'	Report	L. Nmecha 10'; Weghorst (yellow card) 14', (goal) 90+1' (pen.); Baku (yellow card) 30'; Lukebakio (yellow card) 80'	Stadium: Sportpark Ronhof; Attendance: 9,000; Referee: Robert Hartmann

19 September 2021 5	VfL Wolfsburg	1–1	Eintracht Frankfurt	Wolfsburg
19:30 CEST (UTC+2)	Waldschmidt (yellow card) 35'; Guilavogui (yellow card) 51'; Weghorst 70'	Report	Da Costa (yellow card) 9'; Sow (yellow card) 29'; Lammers 38'; Jakić (yellow card) 45+1'; Durm (yellow card) 53'; Hinteregger (yellow card) 68'; Ndicka (yellow card) 88'	Stadium: Volkswagen Arena; Attendance: 9,266; Referee: Felix Zwayer

25 September 2021 6	1899 Hoffenheim	3–1	VfL Wolfsburg	Sinsheim
15:30 CEST (UTC+2)	Kramarić 45+2'; Kadeřábek (yellow card) 50', (goal) 82'; Baumgartner 74'; Grillitsch (yellow card) 78'	Report	Baku 25'; Arnold (yellow card) 78'; Roussillon (yellow card) 80'	Stadium: Rhein-Neckar-Arena; Attendance: 8,523; Referee: Daniel Siebert

2 October 2021 7	VfL Wolfsburg	1–3	Borussia Mönchengladbach	Wolfsburg
15:30 CEST (UTC+2)	Bornauw (yellow card) 4'; Baku (yellow card) 10'; Waldschmidt 25'; Mbabu (yellow card) 59'; Lacroix (yellow card) 67' (yellow-red card) 76'; Weghorst (yellow card) 81'; Roussillon (yellow card) 90+3'	Report	Embolo 5'; Hofmann 7'; Stindl (yellow card) 35', (penalty missed) 76'; Zakaria (yellow card) 36'; Beyer (yellow card) 71'; Scally 90+5'	Stadium: Volkswagen Arena; Attendance: 12,845; Referee: Frank Willenborg

16 October 2021 8	Union Berlin	2–0	VfL Wolfsburg	Berlin
15:30 CEST (UTC+2)	Gießelmann (yellow card) 38'; Awoniyi 49'; Knoche (yellow card) 55'; Jaeckel (yellow card) 79'; Becker 83'	Report	Brooks (yellow card) 86'	Stadium: Stadion An der Alten Försterei; Attendance: 11,000; Referee: Sascha Stegemann

23 October 2021 9	VfL Wolfsburg	0–2	SC Freiburg	Wolfsburg
15:30 CEST (UTC+2)	Steffen (yellow card) 7'; Guilavogui (yellow card) 26'; Mbabu (yellow card) 71'	Report	Lienhart 27'; Höler 68'	Stadium: Volkswagen Arena; Attendance: 10,251; Referee: Tobias Welz

30 October 2021 10	Bayer Leverkusen	0–2	VfL Wolfsburg	Leverkusen
15:30 CEST (UTC+2)	Tah (yellow card) 28'; Alario (yellow card) 30', (penalty missed) 90+6'; Wirtz (yellow card) 54'	Report	Steffen (yellow card) 28'; Brooks (yellow card) 28'; L. Nmecha 48'; Arnold 51'; Lacroix (red card) 90+5'	Stadium: BayArena; Attendance: 20,132; Referee: Deniz Aytekin

6 November 2021 11	VfL Wolfsburg	1–0	FC Augsburg	Wolfsburg
15:30 CET (UTC+1)	L. Nmecha 14'; Guilavogui (yellow card) 86'; F. Nmecha (yellow card) 90+2'	Report	Strobl (yellow card) 39'; Oxford (yellow card) 87'; Valentin (yellow card) 90+4'	Stadium: Volkswagen Arena; Attendance: 16,095; Referee: Marco Fritz

20 November 2021 12	Arminia Bielefeld	2–2	VfL Wolfsburg	Bielefeld
15:30 CET (UTC+1)	Pieper (yellow card) 2'; Okugawa 11'; Vasiliadis (yellow card) 47'; Klos 54' (pen.); De Medina (yellow card) 89'; Schöpf (yellow card) 90+1'	Report	L. Nmecha (yellow card) 22', (goal) 63'; Weghorst 62'	Stadium: Bielefelder Alm; Attendance: 19,801; Referee: Martin Petersen

27 November 2021 13	VfL Wolfsburg	1–3	Borussia Dortmund	Wolfsburg
15:30 CET (UTC+1)	Weghorst 2'; Lukebakio (yellow card) 25'; Lacroix (yellow card) 32'; L. Nmecha (yellow card) 37'; Arnold (yellow card) 42'	Report	Can 35' (pen.); Malen 55'; Wolf (yellow card) 60'; Haaland 81'	Stadium: Volkswagen Arena; Attendance: 13,281; Referee: Sven Jablonski

4 December 2021 14	Mainz 05	3–0	VfL Wolfsburg	Mainz
15:30 CET (UTC+1)	Burkardt 2'; Stach 4'; Barreiro (yellow card) 78'; Lacroix 90' (o.g.)	Report	Mbabu (yellow card) 82'	Stadium: Opel Arena; Attendance: 10,000; Referee: Florian Badstübner

11 December 2021 15	VfL Wolfsburg	0–2	VfB Stuttgart	Wolfsburg
18:30 CET (UTC+1)	Bornauw (yellow card) 24'; Arnold (yellow card) 79'	Report	Mavropanos 25'; Ito (yellow card) 41'; Förster 63'; Marmoush (yellow card) 71', (penalty missed) 79'	Stadium: Volkswagen Arena; Attendance: 5,000; Referee: Sascha Stegemann

14 December 2021 16	VfL Wolfsburg	2–3	1. FC Köln	Wolfsburg
20:30 CET (UTC+1)	L. Nmecha 8', (yellow card) 14'; Weghorst 51'; Roussillon (yellow card) 80'; Arnold (yellow card) 81'	Report	Modeste 34', 89'; Schmitz (yellow card) 61'; Uth 73'; Czichos (yellow card) 87'	Stadium: Volkswagen Arena; Attendance: 5,000; Referee: Robert Hartmann

17 December 2021 17	Bayern Munich	4–0	VfL Wolfsburg	Munich
20:30 CET (UTC+1)	Müller 7'; Upamecano 57'; Sané 59'; Lewandowski 87'	Report		Stadium: Allianz Arena; Attendance: 0 Referee: Tobias Welz

9 January 2022 18	VfL Bochum	1–0	VfL Wolfsburg	Bochum
17:30 CET (UTC+1)	Pantović 65'; Soares (yellow card) 80'	Report	Waldschmidt (yellow card) 33'; Steffen (yellow card) 87'	Stadium: Vonovia Ruhrstadion; Attendance: 0 Referee: Daniel Schlager

15 January 2022 19	VfL Wolfsburg	0–0	Hertha BSC	Wolfsburg
15:30 CET (UTC+1)	Steffen (yellow card) 39'	Report	Klünter (yellow card) 57'	Stadium: Volkswagen Arena; Attendance: 500; Referee: Robert Hartmann

23 January 2022 20	RB Leipzig	2–0	VfL Wolfsburg	Leipzig
15:30 CET (UTC+1)	Simakan (yellow card) 34'; Henrichs (yellow card) 37'; Kampl (yellow card) 67'; Olmo (yellow card) 73'; Orbán 76'; Adams (yellow card) 82'; Gvardiol 84'	Report	Lacroix (yellow card) 59'	Stadium: Red Bull Arena; Attendance: 1,000; Referee: Daniel Siebert

6 February 2022 21	VfL Wolfsburg	4–1	Greuther Fürth	Wolfsburg
17:30 CET (UTC+1)	Vranckx 7', 49', (yellow card) 58'; Arnold 70'; Philipp 75'	Report	Hrgota 44' (pen.); Seguin (yellow card) 45+1'; Griesbeck (yellow card) 63'	Stadium: Volkswagen Arena; Attendance: 500; Referee: Martin Petersen

12 February 2022 22	Eintracht Frankfurt	0–2	VfL Wolfsburg	Frankfurt
15:30 CET (UTC+1)	Jakić (yellow card) 69'	Report	Kruse 28' (pen.); Brooks (yellow card) 43'; Lukebakio 90+3'; Steffen (yellow card) 90+6'	Stadium: Deutsche Bank Park; Attendance: 10,000; Referee: Frank Willenborg

19 February 2022 23	VfL Wolfsburg	1–2	1899 Hoffenheim	Wolfsburg
15:30 CET (UTC+1)	Philipp (yellow card) 11'; Wind 36'	Report	Bruun Larsen 74', (yellow card) 87'; Kramarić 78'; Raum (yellow card) 90+2'	Stadium: Volkswagen Arena; Attendance: 7,145; Referee: Felix Zwayer

26 February 2022 24	Borussia Mönchengladbach	2–2	VfL Wolfsburg	Mönchengladbach
15:30 CET (UTC+1)	Sommer (yellow card) 34'; Thuram 42'; Beyer (yellow card) 65'; Embolo 82'	Report	Wind 6'; Bornauw 33'; Philipp (yellow card) 37'; Baku (yellow card) 37'; Lacroix (red card) 70'; Casteels (yellow card) 76'; Gerhardt (yellow card) 90+3'	Stadium: Borussia-Park; Attendance: 10,000; Referee: Tobias Reichel

5 March 2022 25	VfL Wolfsburg	1–0	Union Berlin	Wolfsburg
15:30 CET (UTC+1)	Awoniyi 24' (o.g.)	Report	Möhwald (yellow card) 90'	Stadium: Volkswagen Arena; Attendance: 15,703; Referee: Patrick Ittrich

12 March 2022 26	SC Freiburg	3–2	VfL Wolfsburg	Freiburg
15:30 CET (UTC+1)	Grifo 7', 44'; N. Schlotterbeck (yellow card) 55', (goal) 87'; Haberer (yellow card) 64'	Report	Kruse 52'; Arnold 84'	Stadium: Europa-Park Stadion; Attendance: 25,000; Referee: Martin Petersen

20 March 2022 27	VfL Wolfsburg	0–2	Bayer Leverkusen	Wolfsburg
17:30 CET (UTC+1)	Lacroix (yellow card) 83'; Vranckx (yellow card) 83'	Report	Adli (yellow card) 9'; Demirbay (yellow card) 83'; Hincapié (yellow card) 83'; Paulinho 86', 90+2'	Stadium: Volkswagen Arena; Attendance: 16,554; Referee: Felix Brych

3 April 2022 28	FC Augsburg	3–0	VfL Wolfsburg	Augsburg
15:30 CEST (UTC+2)	Iago 1'; Dorsch (yellow card) 3'; Niederlechner 62'; Valentin 69'	Report		Stadium: WWK Arena; Attendance: 23,143; Referee: Sascha Stegemann

9 April 2022 29	VfL Wolfsburg	4–0	Arminia Bielefeld	Wolfsburg
15:30 CEST (UTC+2)	L. Nmecha 11', 38'; Arnold 48'; Kruse 53'	Report	Nilsson (yellow card) 55'	Stadium: Volkswagen Arena; Attendance: 22,512; Referee: Benjamin Brand

16 April 2022 30	Borussia Dortmund	6–1	VfL Wolfsburg	Dortmund
15:30 CEST (UTC+2)	Rothe 24'; Witsel 26'; Akanji 28'; Can 35'; Haaland 38', 54'	Report	Baku (yellow card) 33', (goal) 82'; Gerhardt (yellow card) 41'	Stadium: Signal Iduna Park; Attendance: 79,200; Referee: Robert Schröder

22 April 2022 31	VfL Wolfsburg	5–0	Mainz 05	Wolfsburg
20:30 CEST (UTC+2)	Wind 8', 42'; Kruse 24' (pen.), 35', 45+2'	Report	Tauer (red card) 23'; Kohr (yellow card) 81'; Hack (yellow card) 82'	Stadium: Volkswagen Arena; Attendance: 19,055; Referee: Harm Osmers

30 April 2022 32	VfB Stuttgart	1–1	VfL Wolfsburg	Stuttgart
15:30 CEST (UTC+2)	Sosa (yellow card) 22'; Endo (yellow card) 34'; Karazor (yellow card) 55'; Führich 89'	Report	Brooks 13'; Schlager (yellow card) 61'; L. Nmecha (yellow card) 66'	Stadium: Mercedes-Benz Arena; Attendance: 55,000; Referee: Sven Jablonski

7 May 2022 33	1. FC Köln	0–1	VfL Wolfsburg	Cologne
15:30 CEST (UTC+2)		Report	Gerhardt 43'; L. Nmecha (yellow card) 50'; Białek (yellow card) 90+4'	Stadium: RheinEnergieStadion; Attendance: 50,000; Referee: Tobias Stieler

14 May 2022 34	VfL Wolfsburg	2–2	Bayern Munich	Wolfsburg
15:30 CEST (UTC+2)	L. Nmecha (yellow card) 42'; Wind 45'; Kruse 22'	Report	Stanišić 17'; Lewandowski 40'; Upamecano (yellow card) 77'; Richards (yellow card) 88'	Stadium: Volkswagen Arena; Attendance: 30,000; Referee: Robert Hartmann

=== DFB-Pokal ===
8 August 2021 First round	Preußen Münster	2–0 (awd.)	VfL Wolfsburg	Münster
15:30 CEST (UTC+2)	Hoffmeier (yellow card) 51', (goal) 74'; Remberg (yellow card) 63'; Wegkamp (yellow card) 101'	Report	Philipp (yellow card) 35'; Steffen (yellow card) 35'; Lacroix (yellow card) 40'; Brekalo 90'; Weghorst 103'; Brooks (yellow card) 106'; Baku 120+1'	Stadium: Preußenstadion; Attendance: 6,703; Referee: Christian Dingert
Note: The match originally ended 3–1 for Wolfsburg after extra time. Wolfsburg used a total of six substitutes, while only five were allowed, and were disqualified after a protest by Preußen Münster.

=== UEFA Champions League ===
==== Group stage ====
The draw for the group stage was held on 26 August 2021.

Pos	Team	Pld	W	D	L	GF	GA	GD	Pts	Qualification	LIL	SAL	SEV	WOL
1	(France) Lille	6	3	2	1	7	4	+3	11	Advance to knockout phase	—	1–0	0–0	0–0
2	(Austria) Red Bull Salzburg	6	3	1	2	8	6	+2	10	Advance to knockout phase	2–1	—	1–0	3–1
3	(Spain) Sevilla	6	1	3	2	5	5	0	6	Transfer to Europa League	1–2	1–1	—	2–0
4	(Germany) VfL Wolfsburg	6	1	2	3	5	10	−5	5		1–3	2–1	1–1	—

Source: UEFA
Rules for classification: Group stage tiebreakers

14 September 2021 1	Lille (France)	0–0	(Germany) VfL Wolfsburg	Villeneuve-d'Ascq, France
21:00 CEST (UTC+2)	André (yellow card) 31'; Ikoné (yellow card) 63'	Report	Brooks (yellow card) 45+2' (yellow-red card) 63'; Guilavogui (yellow card) 56'; Waldschmidt (yellow card) 65'; L. Nmecha (yellow card) 70'; Lacroix (yellow card) 86'	Stadium: Stade Pierre-Mauroy; Attendance: 34,314; Referee: Danny Makkelie (Netherlands)

29 September 2021 2	VfL Wolfsburg (Germany)	1–1	(Spain) Sevilla	Wolfsburg, Germany
21:00 CEST (UTC+2)	Lacroix (yellow card) 1'; Steffen (yellow card) 16', (goal) 49'; Mbabu (yellow card) 50'; Guilavogui (yellow card) 79' (yellow-red card) 85'; Weghorst (yellow card) 86'; Roussillon (yellow card) 90+5'	Report	Suso (yellow card) 24'; Mir (yellow card) 45+3'; Rekik (yellow card) 82'; Rakitić 87' (pen.)	Stadium: Volkswagen Arena; Attendance: 11,733; Referee: Georgi Kabakov (Bulgaria)

20 October 2021 3	Red Bull Salzburg (Austria)	3–1	(Germany) VfL Wolfsburg	Salzburg, Austria
18:45 CEST (UTC+2)	Adeyemi 3'; Camara (yellow card) 19'; Okafor 65', 77'; Capaldo (yellow card) 87'	Report	L. Nmecha 15'; Mbabu (yellow card) 47'; Arnold (yellow card) 84'	Stadium: Stadion Wals-Siezenheim; Attendance: 29,520; Referee: Daniele Orsato (Italy)

2 November 2021 4	VfL Wolfsburg (Germany)	2–1	(Austria) Red Bull Salzburg	Wolfsburg, Germany
18:45 CET (UTC+1)	Baku 3'; Weghorst (yellow card) 28'; L. Nmecha 60', (yellow card) 83'; Brooks (yellow card) 68'	Report	Wöber 30'; Ulmer (yellow card) 87'	Stadium: Volkswagen Arena; Attendance: 16,112; Referee: Artur Soares Dias (Portugal)

23 November 2021 5	Sevilla (Spain)	2–0	(Germany) VfL Wolfsburg	Seville, Spain
21:00 CEST (UTC+2)	Jordán 13'; Fernando (yellow card) 37'; Mir 90+7'	Report	Guilavogui (yellow card) 52'; Arnold (yellow card) 82'; L. Nmecha (yellow card) 90'	Stadium: Ramón Sánchez Pizjuán; Attendance: 28,663; Referee: Cüneyt Çakır (Turkey)

8 December 2021 6	VfL Wolfsburg (Germany)	1–3	(France) Lille	Wolfsburg, Germany
21:00 CET (UTC+1)	Bornauw (yellow card) 17'; Arnold (yellow card) 62'; Roussillon (yellow card) 87'; Steffen 89', (yellow card) 90+3'	Report	Yılmaz 11'; Fonte (yellow card) 18'; Ikoné (yellow card) 62'; David 72'; Gomes 78'; Mandava (yellow card) 90+3'	Stadium: Volkswagen Arena; Attendance: 6,544; Referee: Daniele Orsato (Italy)

== Statistics ==
=== Appearances and goals ===
No.	Pos	Nat	Player	Total		Bundesliga		DFB-Pokal		Champions League	
No.	Pos	Nat	Player	Apps	Goals	Apps	Goals	Apps	Goals	Apps	Goals
Goalkeepers
1	GK	(Belgium) BEL	Koen Casteels	34	0	28	0	1	0	5	0
12	GK	(Austria) AUT	Pavao Pervan	7	0	6	0	0	0	1	0
30	GK	(Germany) GER	Niklas Klinger	0	0	0	0	0	0	0	0
35	GK	(Germany) GER	Philipp Schulze	0	0	0	0	0	0	0	0
Defenders
2	DF	(Brazil) BRA	William	0	0	0	0	0	0	0	0
3	DF	(Belgium) BEL	Sebastiaan Bornauw	31	1	23+4	1	0+1	0	2+1	0
4	DF	(France) FRA	Maxence Lacroix	36	0	29	0	1	0	6	0
5	DF	(Netherlands) NED	Micky van de Ven	5	0	2+3	0	0	0	0	0
6	DF	(Brazil) BRA	Paulo Otávio	11	0	5+2	0	0	0	2+2	0
15	DF	(France) FRA	Jérôme Roussillon	33	1	18+8	1	1	0	4+2	0
18	DF	(Republic of Ireland) IRL	Anselmo García McNulty	0	0	0	0	0	0	0	0
19	DF	(Switzerland) SUI	Kevin Mbabu	31	0	14+10	0	0+1	0	4+2	0
25	DF	(United States) USA	John Brooks	36	1	29+2	1	1	0	4	0
40	DF	(United States) USA	Kevin Paredes	2	0	0+2	0	0	0	0	0
Midfielders
8	MF	(Belgium) BEL	Aster Vranckx	28	2	12+12	2	0	0	4	0
11	MF	(Switzerland) SUI	Renato Steffen	26	2	13+7	0	1	0	3+2	2
20	MF	(Germany) GER	Ridle Baku	40	5	27+6	3	1	1	5+1	1
22	MF	(England) ENG	Felix Nmecha	18	0	1+15	0	0	0	0+2	0
24	MF	(Austria) AUT	Xaver Schlager	15	0	13+1	0	1	0	0	0
27	MF	(Germany) GER	Maximilian Arnold	41	4	34	4	0+1	0	6	0
31	MF	(Germany) GER	Yannick Gerhardt	33	1	17+10	1	0+1	0	3+2	0
Forwards
7	FW	(Germany) GER	Luca Waldschmidt	17	1	9+5	1	0	0	1+2	0
9	FW	(Germany) GER	Max Kruse	14	7	14	7	0	0	0	0
10	FW	(Germany) GER	Lukas Nmecha	31	10	18+7	8	1	0	3+2	2
17	FW	(Germany) GER	Maximilian Philipp	25	1	12+10	1	1	0	1+1	0
21	FW	(Poland) POL	Bartosz Białek	12	0	1+11	0	0	0	0	0
23	FW	(Denmark) DEN	Jonas Wind	14	5	14	5	0	0	0	0
28	FW	(Belgium) BEL	Dodi Lukebakio	25	1	7+12	1	0	0	2+4	0
Players transferred out during the season
7	MF	(Croatia) CRO	Josip Brekalo	2	1	0+1	0	0+1	1	0	0
9	FW	(Netherlands) NED	Wout Weghorst	24	7	17+1	6	1	1	5	0
14	MF	(Switzerland) SUI	Admir Mehmedi	2	0	0+1	0	0+1	0	0	0
23	MF	(France) FRA	Josuha Guilavogui	21	0	9+6	0	1	0	5	0
29	FW	(Egypt) EGY	Omar Marmoush	2	0	0+2	0	0	0	0	0
33	FW	(Germany) GER	Daniel Ginczek	3	0	0+2	0	0	0	0+1	0

Last updated: 14 May 2022
Source: Competitions

=== Goalscorers ===
As of 14 May 2022

Rank	No.	Pos	Nat	Name	Bundesliga	DFB-Pokal	Champions League	Total
1	10	FW	(Germany)	Lukas Nmecha	8	0	2	10
2	9	FW	(Germany)	Max Kruse	7	0	0	7
2	9	FW	(Netherlands)	Wout Weghorst	6	1	0	7
4	20	MF	(Germany)	Ridle Baku	3	1	1	5
4	23	FW	(Denmark)	Jonas Wind	5	0	0	5
6	27	MF	(Germany)	Maximilian Arnold	4	0	0	4
7	8	MF	(Belgium)	Aster Vranckx	2	0	0	2
7	11	MF	(Switzerland)	Renato Steffen	0	0	2	2
9	3	DF	(Belgium)	Sebastiaan Bornauw	1	0	0	1
9	7	MF	(Croatia)	Josip Brekalo	0	1	0	1
9	7	FW	(Germany)	Luca Waldschmidt	1	0	0	1
9	15	DF	(France)	Jérôme Roussillon	1	0	0	1
9	17	FW	(Germany)	Maximilian Philipp	1	0	0	1
9	25	DF	(United States)	John Brooks	1	0	0	1
9	28	FW	(Belgium)	Dodi Lukebakio	1	0	0	1
9	31	MF	(Germany)	Yannick Gerhardt	1	0	0	1
Own goals					1	0	0	1
Totals					43	3	5	51
