= Jérôme Roussillon =

Guadeloupean footballer (born 1993)

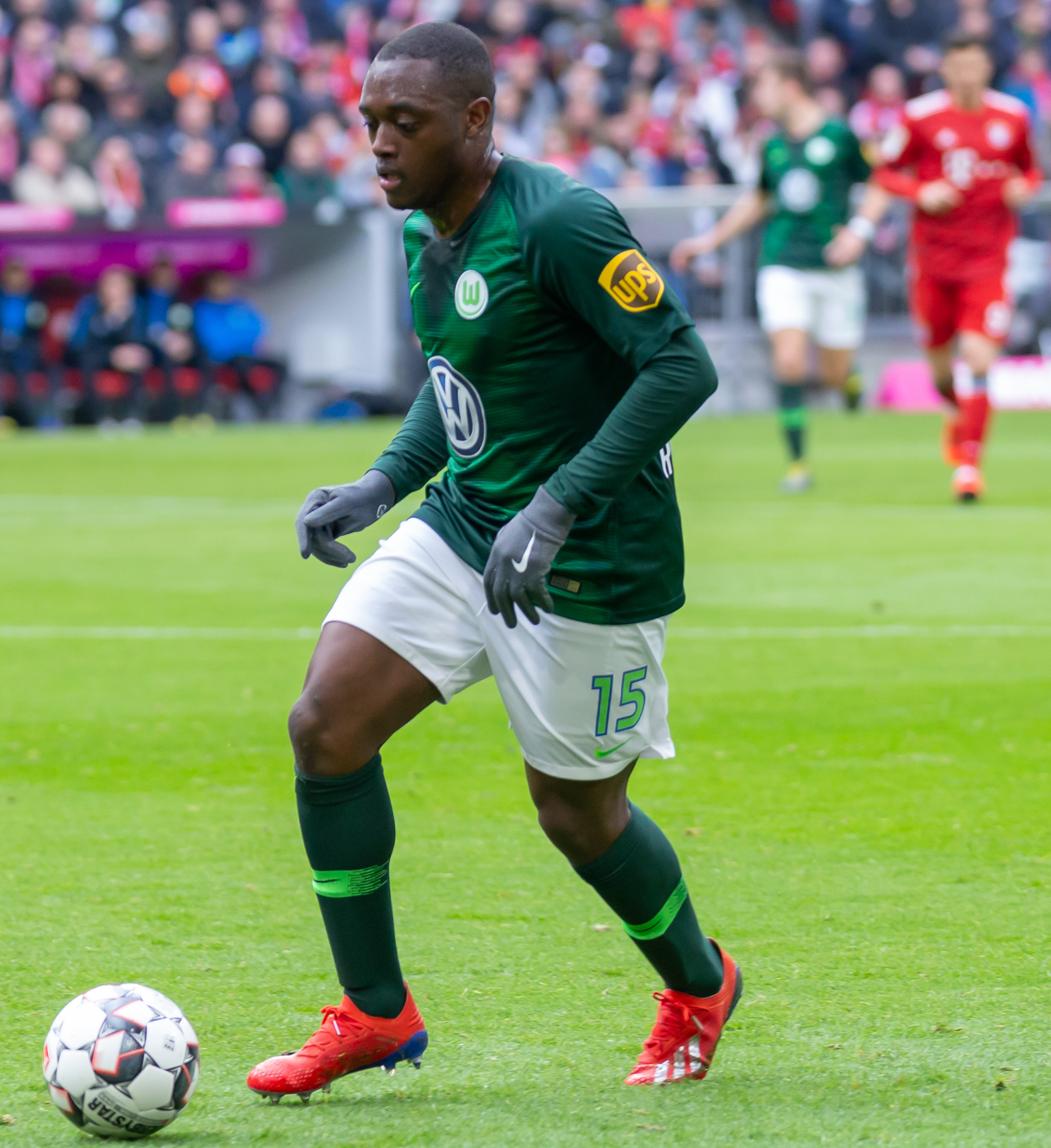
- Roussillon with Wolfsburg in 2019

Personal information
- Full name: Jérôme Xavier Roussillon
- Date of birth: 6 January 1993 (age 33)
- Place of birth: Sarcelles, France
- Height: 1.75 m (5 ft 9 in)
- Position: Left-back

Youth career
- 1999–2008: Saint-Denis
- 2005–2009: INF Clairefontaine
- 2009–2012: Sochaux

Senior career*
Years	Team	Apps	(Gls)
2010–2014	Sochaux II	44	(3)
2012–2015	Sochaux	54	(0)
2015–2018	Montpellier	87	(7)
2017	Montpellier II	1	(0)
2018–2023	VfL Wolfsburg	107	(5)
2023–2025	Union Berlin	46	(0)
2025–2026	Charlton Athletic	0	(0)
2026	Amiens	7	(0)

International career^{‡}
2010–2011	France U18	3	(0)
2013	France U20	2	(0)
2023–	Guadeloupe	17	(2)
- * Club domestic league appearances and goals as of 9 May 2026 ‡ National team caps and goals as of 17:10, 28 November 2025 (UTC)

Jérôme Xavier Roussillon (French: [ʒeʁom ʁusijɔ̃]; born 6 January 1993) is a professional footballer who plays as a left-back. Born in mainland France, he plays for the Guadeloupe national team.

== Career ==
=== Sochaux ===
Roussillon made his professional debut with Sochaux on 2 May 2012 in a league match against Ajaccio appearing as a substitute.

=== Montpellier HSC ===
In January 2015, Roussillon signed a four-year contract with Montpellier, starting from July.

=== VfL Wolfsburg ===
On 6 August 2018, Roussillon joined VfL Wolfsburg on a four-year deal.

=== Union Berlin ===
In January 2023, Roussillon joined Union Berlin.

=== Charlton Athletic ===
On 28 November 2025, Roussillon joined Charlton Athletic on a short-term contract.

=== Amiens SC ===
On 26 January 2026, Roussillon joined Amiens following the conclusion of his short spell at Charlton Athletic where he made no appearances.

== International career ==
Roussillon is a former France youth international, having represented them in under-18 and under-20 levels. In March 2023, he opted to play for the Guadeloupe national team.

He made his senior debut for Guadeloupe on 24 March 2023 in a 1–0 loss against Antigua and Barbuda in the CONCACAF Nations League.

== Career statistics ==
=== Club ===
As of 13 March 2026

Appearances and goals by club, season and competition
Club	Season	League			National Cup (Note: Includes Coupe de France, DFB-Pokal and FA Cup)		League Cup (Note: Includes Coupe de la Ligue and EFL Cup)		Europe		Other		Total	
Club	Season	Division	Apps	Goals	Apps	Goals	Apps	Goals	Apps	Goals	Apps	Goals	Apps	Goals
Sochaux II	2010–11	Championnat National 2	22	1	—		—		—		—		22	1
Sochaux II	2011–12	Championnat National 2	19	2	—		—		—		—		19	2
Sochaux II	2013–14	Championnat National 2	3	0	—		—		—		—		3	0
Sochaux II	Total		44	3	—		—		—		—		44	3
Sochaux	2011–12	Ligue 1	4	0	0	0	0	0	—		—		4	0
Sochaux	2012–13	Ligue 1	25	0	2	0	1	0	—		—		28	0
Sochaux	2013–14	Ligue 1	1	0	0	0	0	0	—		—		1	0
Sochaux	2014–15	Ligue 1	24	0	0	0	1	0	—		—		25	0
Sochaux	Total		54	0	2	0	2	0	0	0	0	0	58	0
Montpellier	2015–16	Ligue 1	33	3	2	0	1	0	—		—		36	3
Montpellier	2016–17	Ligue 1	32	1	1	0	1	0	—		—		34	1
Montpellier	2017–18	Ligue 1	22	3	1	0	2	0	—		—		25	3
Montpellier	Total		87	7	4	0	4	0	0	0	0	0	95	7
Montpellier II	2017–18	Championnat National 3	1	0	—		—		—		—		1	0
VfL Wolfsburg	2018–19	Bundesliga	28	3	3	0	—		—		—		31	3
VfL Wolfsburg	2019–20	Bundesliga	29	1	1	0	—		7 (Note: Appearance(s) in UEFA Europa League)	0	—		37	1
VfL Wolfsburg	2020–21	Bundesliga	20	0	0	0	—		3	0	—		23	0
VfL Wolfsburg	2021–22	Bundesliga	26	1	1	0	—		6 (Note: Appearance(s) in UEFA Champions League)	0	—		33	1
VfL Wolfsburg	2022–23	Bundesliga	4	0	0	0	—		—		—		4	0
VfL Wolfsburg	Total		107	5	5	0	—		16	0	0	0	128	5
Union Berlin	2022–23	Bundesliga	16	0	1	0	—		3	0	—		20	0
Union Berlin	2023–24	Bundesliga	23	0	2	0	—		4	0	—		29	0
Union Berlin	2024–25	Bundesliga	7	0	0	0	—		—		—		7	0
Union Berlin	Total		46	0	3	0	—		7	0	0	0	56	0
Charlton Athletic	2025–26	Championship	0	0	0	0	—		—		—		0	0
Amiens	2025–26	Ligue 2	7	0	1	0	—		—		—		8	0
Career total			346	15	15	0	6	0	23	0	0	0	390	15
