= Bartosz Białek =

Polish footballer (born 2001)

Personal information
- Date of birth: 11 November 2001 (age 24)
- Place of birth: Brzeg, Poland
- Height: 1.91 m (6 ft 3 in)
- Position: Forward

Team information
- Current team: Wieczysta Kraków
- Number: 21

Youth career
- –2011: Stal Brzeg
- 2011–2014: MKS Oława
- 2014–2018: Zagłębie Lubin

Senior career*
Years	Team	Apps	(Gls)
2018–2019	Zagłębie Lubin II	18	(6)
2019–2020	Zagłębie Lubin	19	(9)
2020–2025	VfL Wolfsburg	31	(2)
2022–2023	→ Vitesse (loan)	25	(5)
2023–2024	→ Eupen (loan)	6	(1)
2025–2026	Darmstadt 98	14	(0)
2026–	Wieczysta Kraków	5	(0)

International career
2017	Poland U17	3	(0)
2019	Poland U18	2	(0)
2019	Poland U19	7	(3)
2020–2022	Poland U21	10	(4)
- * Club domestic league appearances and goals as of 13 October 2026

Bartosz Białek (born 11 November 2001) is a Polish professional footballer who plays as a forward for Ekstraklasa club Wieczysta Kraków.

== Career ==
On 19 August 2020, Białek joined VfL Wolfsburg on a four-year contract. On 27 November 2020, he scored the final goal in a 5–3 home victory against Werder Bremen. In late February 2021, he suffered an anterior cruciate ligament injury during training, keeping him out of play until the following January.

On 28 August 2022, Białek joined Eredivisie side Vitesse on loan.

On 12 July 2023, Białek was sent on another loan, this time joining Belgian Pro League side Eupen until the end of the season. Only three days later, during a pre-season friendly against Reims, he suffered another knee injury which sidelined him for the next nine months. He returned to football on 7 April 2024, making his debut in the starting line-up for a 1–1 relegation play-off draw against Kortrijk.

In mid-July 2024, after returning to Wolfsburg, Białek injured his knee again during pre-season training, and was ruled out of play for several months. On 30 April 2025, it was announced he would leave Wolfsburg at the end of his contract in June.

On 15 July 2025, Białek signed with Darmstadt 98 in 2. Bundesliga. He scored once in 17 appearances before being released at the end of the 2025–26 season.

On 11 August 2026, Białek returned to Poland and joined Ekstraklasa newcomers Wieczysta Kraków on a one-year deal, with a one-year extension option.

== Career statistics ==
As of match played 10 May 2026

Appearances and goals by club, season and competition
Club	Season	League			National cup (Note: Includes Polish Cup, DFB-Pokal, KNVB Cup)		Continental		Other		Total	
Club	Season	Division	Apps	Goals	Apps	Goals	Apps	Goals	Apps	Goals	Apps	Goals
Zagłębie Lubin II	2017–18	III liga, group III	1	0	0	0	—		—		1	0
Zagłębie Lubin II	2018–19	III liga, group III	5	2	—		—		—		5	2
Zagłębie Lubin II	2019–20	III liga, group III	12	4	1	1	—		—		13	5
Zagłębie Lubin II	Total		18	6	1	1	—		—		19	7
Zagłębie Lubin	2019–20	Ekstraklasa	19	9	1	0	—		—		20	9
VfL Wolfsburg	2020–21	Bundesliga	19	2	4	0	1 (Note: Appearance in UEFA Europa League)	0	—		24	2
VfL Wolfsburg	2021–22	Bundesliga	12	0	0	0	0	0	—		12	0
VfL Wolfsburg	2024–25	Bundesliga	0	0	0	0	—		—		0	0
VfL Wolfsburg	Total		31	2	4	0	1	0	—		36	2
Vitesse (loan)	2022–23	Eredivisie	25	5	1	1	—		—		26	6
Eupen (loan)	2023–24	Belgian Pro League	6	1	0	0	—		—		6	1
Darmstadt 98	2025–26	2. Bundesliga	14	0	3	1	—		—		17	1
Wieczysta Kraków	2026–27	Ekstraklasa	0	0	0	0	—		—		0	0
Career total			113	23	10	3	1	0	0	0	124	26

== Honours ==
Zagłębie Lubin II

- Polish Cup (Lower Silesia regionals): 2018–19
- Polish Cup (Legnica regionals): 2018–19

Individual

- Ekstraklasa Young Player of the Month: November 2019
