= Lukas Nmecha =

German footballer (born 1998)

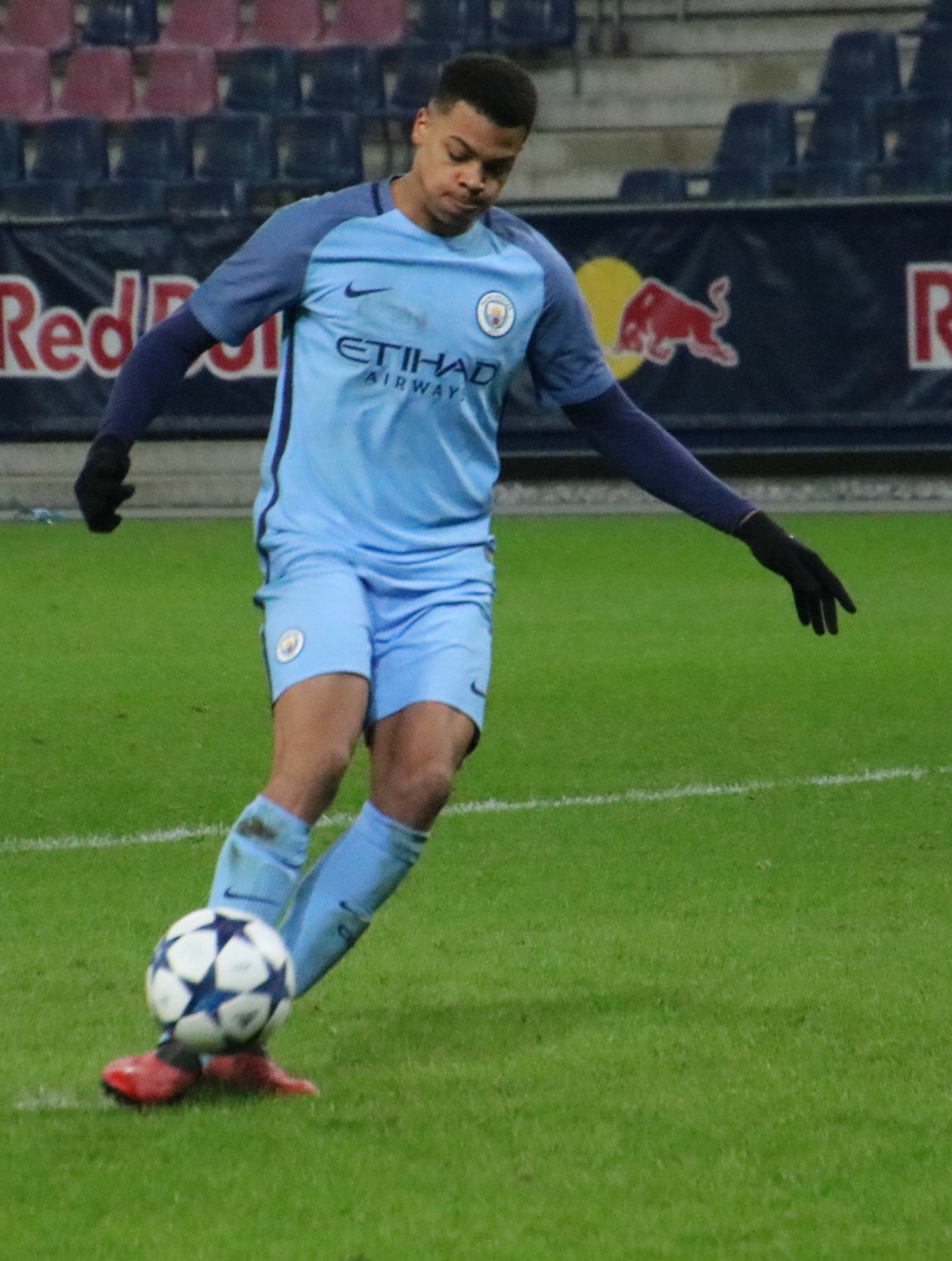
- Nmecha playing for Manchester City in 2017

Personal information
- Full name: Lukas Okechukwu Nmecha
- Date of birth: 14 December 1998 (age 27)
- Place of birth: Hamburg, Germany
- Height: 1.85 m (6 ft 1 in)
- Position: Forward

Team information
- Current team: Leeds United
- Number: 14

Youth career
- 2007–2018: Manchester City

Senior career*
Years	Team	Apps	(Gls)
2017–2021	Manchester City	2	(0)
2018–2019	→ Preston North End (loan)	41	(3)
2019–2020	→ VfL Wolfsburg (loan)	6	(0)
2020	→ Middlesbrough (loan)	11	(0)
2020–2021	→ Anderlecht (loan)	37	(18)
2021–2025	VfL Wolfsburg	63	(16)
2025–	Leeds United	31	(6)

International career
2013	England U16	2	(0)
2014–2015	England U17	10	(2)
2016	England U18	4	(2)
2016–2017	England U19	11	(3)
2018	England U20	1	(1)
2018	England U21	3	(0)
2019–2021	Germany U21	20	(12)
2021–2022	Germany	7	(0)
Medal record
Men's football
Representing Germany
UEFA European Under-21 Championship
Winner	2021
Runner-up	2019
- * Club domestic league appearances and goals as of 23:09, 24 May 2026 (UTC)

Lukas Okechukwu Nmecha (born 14 December 1998) is a German professional footballer who plays as a forward for Premier League club Leeds United.

Nmecha was born in Hamburg, Germany, but relocated to England as a child with his family. He represented his birth country for the first time with the Germany U21 national team, despite being capped by England at the same level.

== Club career ==
=== Manchester City ===
During a football tournament at his primary school team in Wythenshawe, he was scouted by Manchester City, where he played for their youth ranks for over a decade, before making his debut on 19 December 2017 in the EFL Cup. On his debut he scored the third penalty for Manchester City in their penalty shootout win over Leicester City.

He made his Premier League debut on 29 April 2018, as a late substitute for Gabriel Jesus against West Ham United at the London Stadium.

He was involved in several games during Manchester City's first team squad for the 2018–19 pre season tour in the U.S. to compete in the 2018 International Champions Cup. He scored his first goal at first team level on 29 July 2018 in the pre season friendly against Bayern Munich in a 3–2 win.

==== Preston North End (loan) ====
Nmecha was loaned to EFL Championship club Preston North End for the 2018–19 season on 9 August 2018, and made his debut for the club two days later, starting in a 1–0 defeat away to Swansea City. Nmecha would later describe it as a "horrible game" and a "shock" as he had "never received so many long balls before in my life". It took until his 23rd appearance for the club, a 1–1 draw with Aston Villa to score his first goal for the club, with Nmecha admitting it "probably should have come before now", though he got his second goal in the following match, a 2–1 defeat to Rotherham United. In total, he scored 4 times in 25 starts and 19 substitute appearances across the 2018–19 season. Lancashire Evening Post journalist Dave Seddon described Nmecha as "inconsistent" over this loan spell, adding that "at times he looked absolutely fantastic but then in other games he looked a bit lost",

==== VfL Wolfsburg (loan) ====
On 3 August 2019, Nmecha joined Bundesliga club VfL Wolfsburg on a season-long loan.

==== Middlesbrough (loan) ====
Nmecha's loan was ended on 3 January 2020 and he joined Middlesbrough on loan. His loan expired on 31 July 2020.

==== Anderlecht (loan) ====
On 21 August 2020, Nmecha joined former teammate Vincent Kompany's team Anderlecht on loan. On 13 September 2020, he scored his first goal with Anderlecht in a 2–0 win over Cercle Brugge. On 19 September, he scored a brace in a 4–2 win over Waasland-Beveren. He ended the 2020–21 season scoring 18 goals in 37 matches.

=== Return to Wolfsburg ===
Nmecha re-joined VfL Wolfsburg in a permanent deal on 16 July 2021. He scored the winning goal on his Bundesliga debut for the club, in a come-from-behind 2–1 victory over Hertha Berlin on 21 August.

=== Leeds United ===
On 15 June 2025, it was announced that Nmecha would join Leeds United on a free transfer, having agreed to a two-year contract. Nmecha made his Leeds United debut on 18 August, playing Leeds' opening game of the season. He scored the winning (and only) goal against Everton.

On 17 January 2026, Nmecha scored the latest game-winning goal of his senior career, and the latest goal of his Premier League career, driving home a volley in the 91st minute of a 1-0 victory over Fulham at Elland Road on a cross from captain Ethan Ampadu.

== International career ==
Born in Hamburg to a German mother and a Nigerian father, but raised in England, Nmecha was eligible to play for Nigeria, Germany and England.

=== England ===
In October 2014, Nmecha scored for the England Under-17 team in a qualifier against Macedonia. Nmecha was included in the England under-19 squad for the 2017 UEFA European Under-19 Championship. He scored the only goal of the game in the semi-final against the Czech Republic and also scored the winner in the final against Portugal.

On 18 May 2018, Nmecha received a call up to the England U21 team by manager Aidy Boothroyd, for the Toulon Tournament. On 9 June 2018, he came on as a substitute in the 2018 Toulon Tournament final as England defeated Mexico to retain the title. In November 2018, he scored for the England Under-20 team against Germany.

=== Germany ===
In March 2019, Nmecha declared for Germany and was included in their U21 squad for the first time. He made his debut as a 59th minute substitute during the 2–1 victory over England at Bournemouth on 26 March 2019. On 6 June 2021, he scored the only goal in a 1–0 win over Portugal in the 2021 UEFA European Under-21 Championship Final, and finished the competition as top scorer with four goals.

Nmecha made his debut for the senior national team on 11 November 2021 in a World Cup qualifier against Liechtenstein.

== Personal life ==
The son of a German mother and an Igbo Nigerian father, Nmecha – and his younger brother Felix – were born in Hamburg but moved to England with their family in 2007. After honing their skills in the Hamburg borough of Altona, the switch to Manchester brought the young Nmechas to the attention of Premier League team Manchester City. Both went on to join the club's academy.

== Style of play ==
Nmecha's main position is as a centre forward, though he has also played as a winger on either side. He is 6 ft 1 in (1.85 m) tall and noted for his strength and his hold-up play, with Nmecha liking to drop deep to link play. He is often thought of as an all-round striker, with Kevin Schwank of Bild claiming in 2022 that "in Germany everyone raves about Lukas because he is a complete striker", and German national team teammate Thomas Müller claiming that Nmecha "is a player who comes very close to the ideal striker". His style of play has therefore been compared to that of Mario Gómez. He has also been praised for his finishing ability, with his former manager at Middlesbrough, Jonathan Woodgate, claiming that Nmecha was "one of the best finishers I’ve played with or managed".

== Career statistics ==
=== Club ===
As of match played 24 May 2026

Appearances and goals by club, season and competition
Club	Season	League			National cup (Note: Includes FA Cup, DFB-Pokal, Belgian Cup)		League cup (Note: Includes EFL Cup)		Europe		Other		Total	
Club	Season	Division	Apps	Goals	Apps	Goals	Apps	Goals	Apps	Goals	Apps	Goals	Apps	Goals
Manchester City	2017–18	Premier League	2	0	0	0	1	0	0	0	—		3	0
Manchester City U23	2017–18	—			—		—		—		2 (Note: Appearances in EFL Trophy)	1	2	1
Preston North End (loan)	2018–19	Championship	41	4	1	0	2	0	—		—		44	4
VfL Wolfsburg (loan)	2019–20	Bundesliga	6	0	1	0	—		5 (Note: Appearances in UEFA Europa League)	0	—		12	0
Middlesbrough (loan)	2019–20	Championship	11	0	2	0	—		—		—		13	0
Anderlecht (loan)	2020–21	Belgian Pro League	37	18	4	3	—		—		—		41	21
VfL Wolfsburg	2021–22	Bundesliga	25	8	1	0	—		5 (Note: Appearances in UEFA Champions League)	2	—		31	10
VfL Wolfsburg	2022–23	Bundesliga	16	4	2	0	—		—		—		18	4
VfL Wolfsburg	2023–24	Bundesliga	3	1	1	1	—		—		—		4	2
VfL Wolfsburg	2024–25	Bundesliga	19	3	1	0	—		—		—		20	3
VfL Wolfsburg	Total		63	16	5	1	—		5	2	—		73	19
Leeds United	2025–26	Premier League	31	6	5	1	1	0	—		—		37	7
Career total			191	44	18	5	4	0	10	2	2	1	225	52

=== International ===
As of match played 23 September 2022

Appearances and goals by national team and year
National team	Year	Apps	Goals
Germany	2021	2	0
Germany	2022	5	0
Total		7	0

== Honours ==
England U19

- UEFA European Under-19 Championship: 2017

England U21

- Toulon Tournament: 2018

Germany U21

- UEFA European Under-21 Championship: 2021

Individual

- Anderlecht Player of the Season: 2020–21
- UEFA European Under-21 Championship Team of The Tournament: 2021
