= Luise von Martens =

German painter (1828–1894)

Louise Henriette von Martens
- Born: January 15, 1828; Stuttgart
- Died: September 16, 1894 (aged 66); Stuttgart

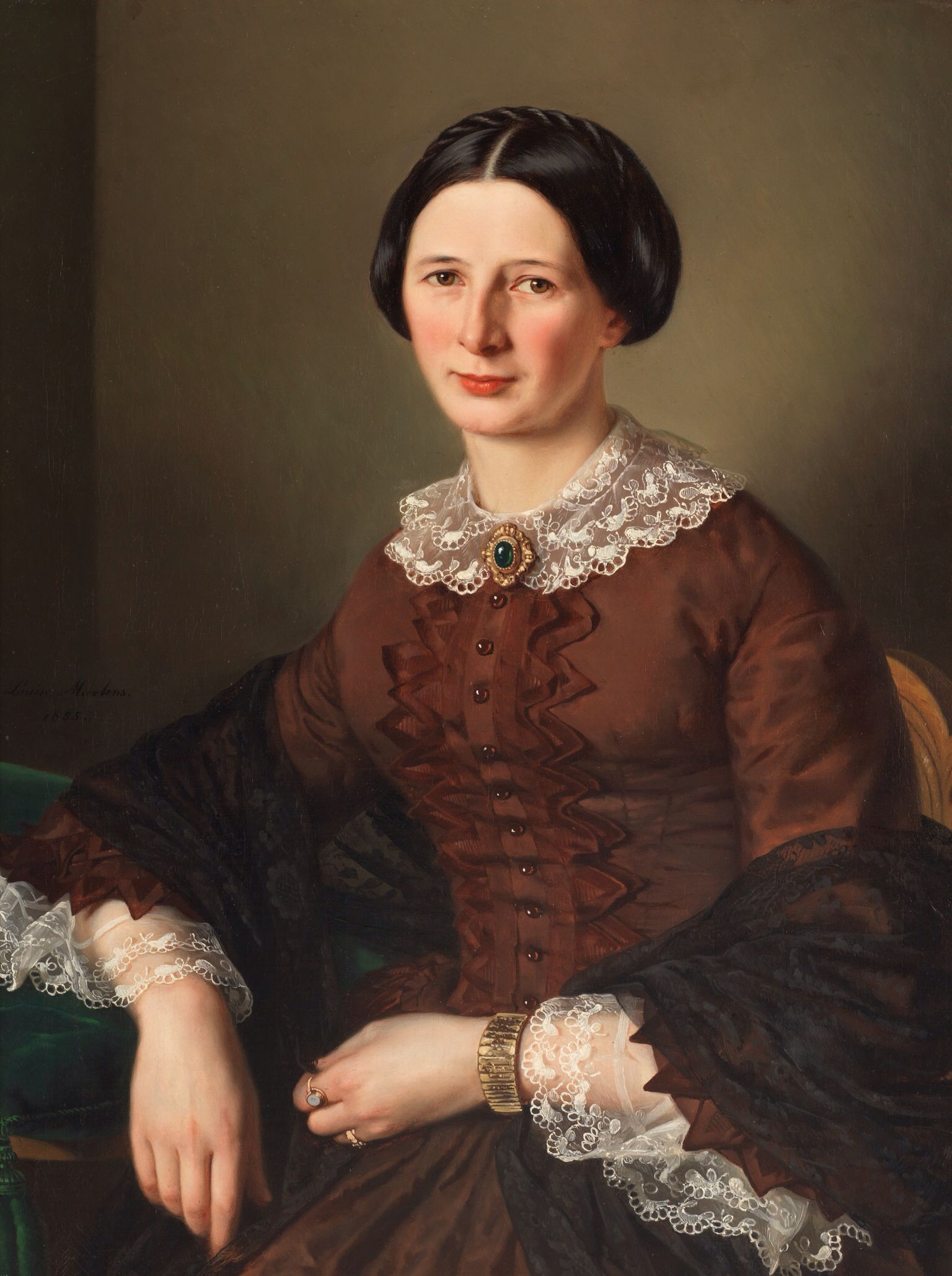
Portrait of a Lady, painted by von Martens in 1855

Luise Henriette von Martens (January 15, 1828 – September 16, 1894) was a German painter and draughtswoman.

== Biography ==
Luise von Martens was born in Stuttgart on 15 January 1828. Her father was Georg Matthias von Martens, a lawyer and botanist, and her brother was the zoologist Eduard von Martens.

Von Martens studied painting in Düsseldorf under Karl Ferdinand Sohn, after which she travelled abroad. Von Mrtens painted or drew portraits and landscapes, as well as still life paintings. She painted her father Georg in 1850; the painting is now held in the permanent collection of the Staatsgalerie Stuttgart.

Von Martens died unmarried on 16 September 1894.
