= Johanna Martens =

Johanna Hendrica Martens (18 October 1818, in Zutphen – 4 March 1867, in Amsterdam) was a Dutch woman, known for the last court case about a woman posing as a man to enlist in the army in the Netherlands.

Martens was born to Engbert Martens and Christina van Bemen, Catholics in Zutphen. She became a maid in Amsterdam and fell in love with an infantryman, to the dislike of both her family and employer.

She followed him, dressed as a man, when he left the town with his regiment to enlist in order to be near him. On her way there, she was arrested for theft and exposed. The case attracted great attention in contemporary Dutch press for its romantic circumstances and the defense used this by claiming that she had been led to her crime blinded by love. She was sentenced to four years in prison in 1839.

After she served her prison time, she became a seamstress and married four times in Amsterdam: Theodorus Hendricus Koster (1821–before 1851) in August 1844; Fredrik Johannes Vrijberg (1823–1854) in August 1851; Harmanus Kok (1805–1857), a widower with nine children, in January 1856; and Antonius Koopman (1820–1898), a widower with four children, on 4 May 1859.
