= Luca Horn =

German footballer (born 1998)

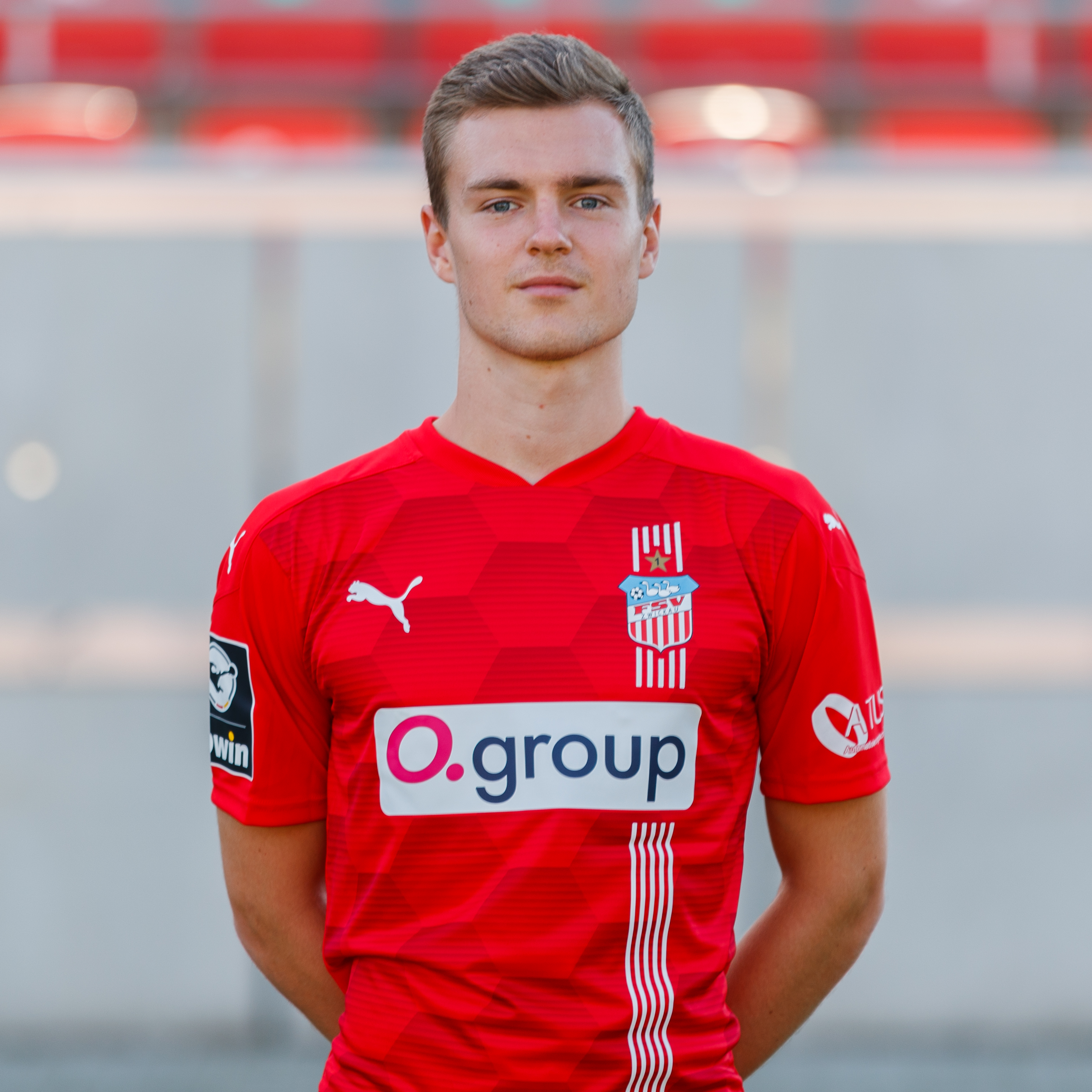
- Horn with FSV Zwickau in 2021

Personal information
- Full name: Luca Finn Horn
- Date of birth: 19 December 1998 (age 27)
- Place of birth: Wilhelmshaven, Germany
- Height: 1.77 m (5 ft 10 in)
- Positions: Left midfielder; left-back

Team information
- Current team: FSV Schöningen
- Number: 13

Youth career
- –2010: WSC Frisia Wilhelmshaven
- 2010–2017: Werder Bremen

Senior career*
Years	Team	Apps	(Gls)
2017–2020	VfL Wolfsburg II	29	(2)
2020	VfL Wolfsburg	1	(0)
2020–2022	Hansa Rostock	8	(0)
2021–2022	→ FSV Zwickau (loan)	23	(1)
2022–2023	Hansa Rostock II	27	(10)
2023–2025	SV Rödinghausen	57	(3)
2025–2026	SF Lotte	29	(3)
2026–	FSV Schöningen	8	(0)
- * Club domestic league appearances and goals as of 22 September 2026

Luca Finn Horn (born 19 December 1998) is a German professional footballer who plays as a left midfielder for Regionalliga Nord club FSV Schöningen.

== Career ==
In September 2020 Horn moved to 3. Liga club FC Hansa Rostock.

In June 2021, he signed for FSV Zwickau on a season-long loan.
