= Padalište =

Padalište Падалиште Patalisht
- Village
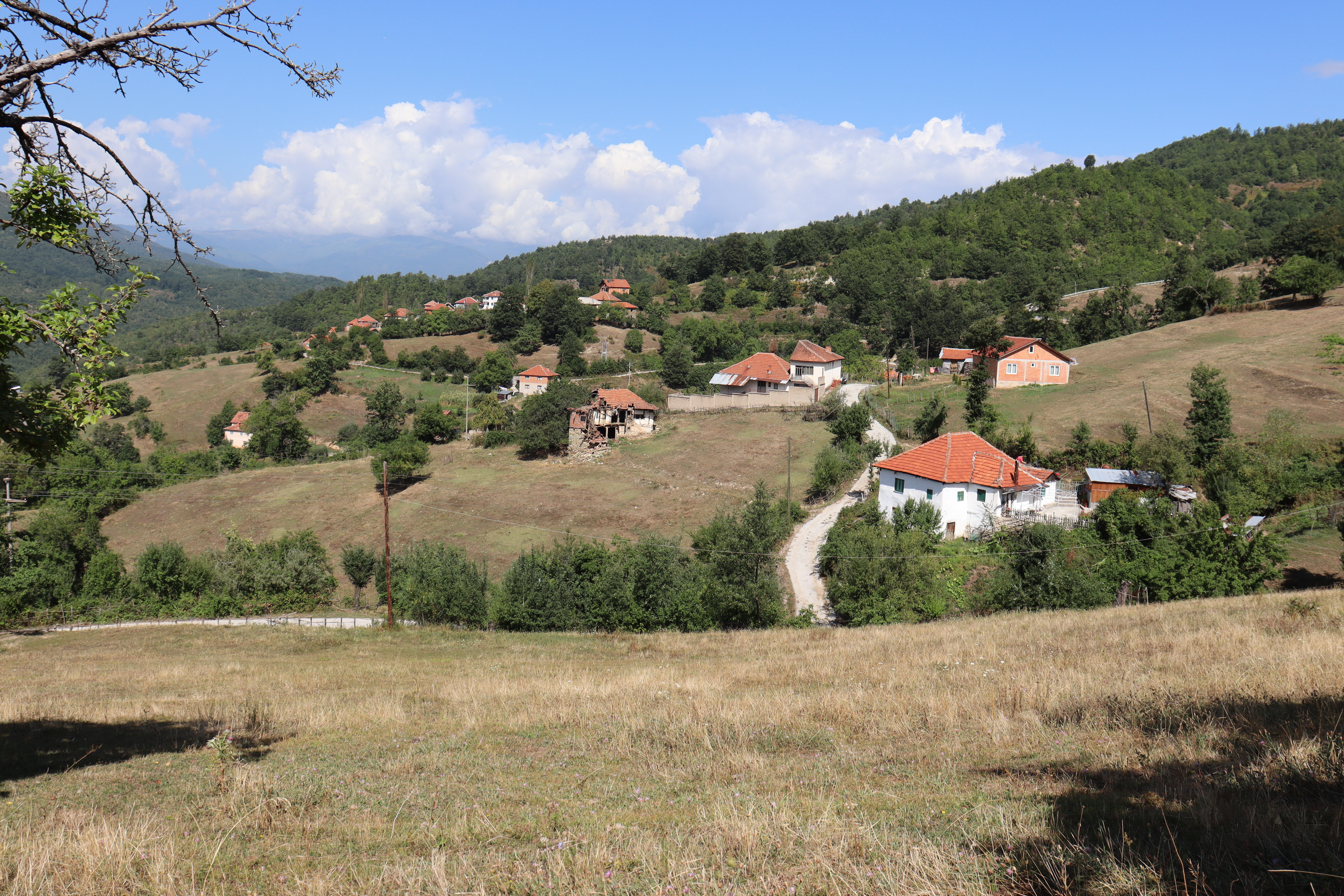
- View of the village

- Location within North Macedonia
- Coordinates: 41°41′N 20°59′E
- Country: North Macedonia
- Region: Polog
- Municipality: Gostivar

Population (2021)
  - Total: 287
- Time zone: UTC+1 (CET)
  - Summer (DST): UTC+2 (CEST)
- Car plates: GV
- Website: .

Padalište (Macedonian: Падалиште, Albanian: Patalisht) is a village in the municipality of Gostivar, North Macedonia.

== Demographics ==
As of the 2021 census, Padalište had 287 residents with the following ethnic composition:

- Albanians 251
- Persons for whom data are taken from administrative sources 34
- Others 2

According to the 2002 census, the village had a total of 721 inhabitants. Ethnic groups in the village include:

- Albanians 717
- Turks 1
- Others 3

According to the 1942 Albanian census, Padalište was inhabited by 764 Muslim Albanians.
