= Theo Martens =

Dutch footballer

Personal information
- Date of birth: 14 September 1990 (age 36)
- Place of birth: Tilburg, Netherlands
- Height: 1.78 m (5 ft 10 in)
- Position: Midfielder

Team information
- Current team: Dongen
- Number: 4

Youth career
- WSJ
- Den Bosch
- Willem II

Senior career*
Years	Team	Apps	(Gls)
2012–2013	Veendam	4	(0)
2013–2014	Witgoor Dessel		
2014–2021	Achilles Veen		
2021–	Dongen	54	(2)
- * Club domestic league appearances and goals as of 17:55, 8 November 2024 (UTC)

Theo Martens (born 14 September 1990) is a Dutch footballer who plays as a midfielder for Dongen in the Vierde Divisie.

== Club career ==
In 2012, Martens played for SC Veendam in the Eerste Divisie, which, however, went bankrupt in early 2013. In the 2013–14 season he played in Belgium for Witgoor Dessel in the Fourth Division C. Since 2014, he has played for Achilles Veen. On 6 January 2021, the club announced that Martens would leave at the end of the season after seven seasons. He subsequently signed with VV Dongen.
