= 2024 DFL-Supercup =

German Supercup
- Event: DFL-Supercup
Bayer Leverkusen	VfB Stuttgart
2	2
- Bayer Leverkusen won 4–3 on penalties
- Date: 17 August 2024
- Venue: BayArena, Leverkusen
- Man of the Match: Deniz Undav (VfB Stuttgart)
- Referee: Tobias Stieler (Hamburg)
- Attendance: 30,210

The 2024 DFL-Supercup was the 15th edition of the German super cup under the name DFL-Supercup, an annual football match contested by the winners of the previous season's Bundesliga and DFB-Pokal competitions. The match was played on 17 August 2024.

The match featured Bayer Leverkusen, the champions of the 2023–24 Bundesliga and winners of the 2023–24 DFB-Pokal (completing a domestic double), and VfB Stuttgart, the runners-up of the Bundesliga. Though the league champions usually played away, the Deutsche Fußball Liga selected Bayer Leverkusen to host the match at the BayArena in Leverkusen. This was the first DFL-Supercup since 2011 not to feature Bayern Munich.

Bayer Leverkusen won the match 4–3 on penalties, following a 2–2 draw after 90 minutes, for their first DFL-Supercup title.

== Teams ==
In the following table, matches until 1996 were in the DFB-Supercup era, since 2010 were in the DFL-Supercup era.

Team	Qualification	Previous appearances (bold indicates winners)
Bayer Leverkusen	2023–24 Bundesliga champions and 2023–24 DFB-Pokal winners	1 (1993)
VfB Stuttgart	2023–24 Bundesliga runners-up	1 (**1992**)

== Match ==
=== Details ===
17 August 2024
20:30 CEST

Bayer Leverkusen	2–2	VfB Stuttgart
Boniface 11'; Schick 88'	Report	Millot 15'; Undav 63'
Penalties
Schick (penalty scored); Grimaldo (penalty scored); García (penalty scored); Tapsoba (penalty scored)	4–3	(penalty scored) Millot; (penalty scored) Demirović; (penalty missed) Krätzig; (penalty scored) Undav; (penalty missed) Silas

BayArena, Leverkusen
Attendance: 30,210
Referee: Tobias Stieler (Hamburg)

**Bayer Leverkusen**	**VfB Stuttgart**

GK	1	(Finland) Lukas Hradecky (c)
CB	12	(Burkina Faso) Edmond Tapsoba	(yellow card) 71'
CB	8	(Germany) Robert Andrich		(substituted off) 73'
CB	3	(Ecuador) Piero Hincapié
RM	19	(Nigeria) Nathan Tella		(substituted off) 73'
CM	34	(Switzerland) Granit Xhaka	(yellow card) 61'
CM	24	(Spain) Aleix García
LM	44	(France) Jeanuël Belocian		(substituted off) 84'
RW	21	(Morocco) Amine Adli		(substituted off) 73'
CF	22	(Nigeria) Victor Boniface	(yellow card) 80'	(substituted off) 41'
LW	11	(France) Martin Terrier	(red card) 37'
Substitutes:
GK	17	(Czech Republic) Matěj Kovář
DF	4	(Germany) Jonathan Tah		(substituted on) 41'
DF	6	(Ivory Coast) Odilon Kossounou
DF	13	(Brazil) Arthur
DF	20	(Spain) Álex Grimaldo		(substituted on) 84'
DF	30	(Netherlands) Jeremie Frimpong	(yellow card) 86'	(substituted on) 73'
MF	7	(Germany) Jonas Hofmann
FW	10	(Germany) Florian Wirtz	(yellow card) 85'	(substituted on) 73'
FW	14	(Czech Republic) Patrik Schick		(substituted on) 73'
Manager:
(Spain) Xabi Alonso			(yellow card) 43'

GK	33	(Germany) Alexander Nübel
RB	15	(Germany) Pascal Stenzel	(yellow card) 82'	(substituted off) 83'
CB	29	(France) Anthony Rouault
CB	24	(Germany) Jeff Chabot	(yellow card) 86'
LB	7	(Germany) Maximilian Mittelstädt		(substituted off) 62'
DM	16	(Germany) Atakan Karazor (c)
DM	6	(Germany) Angelo Stiller	(yellow card) 44'	(substituted off) 62'
RW	18	(Germany) Jamie Leweling		(substituted off) 62'
LW	27	(Germany) Chris Führich		(substituted off) 77'
SS	8	(France) Enzo Millot	(yellow card) 78'
CF	9	(Bosnia and Herzegovina) Ermedin Demirović	(yellow card) 71'
Substitutes:
GK	1	(Germany) Fabian Bredlow
DF	3	(Netherlands) Ramon Hendriks
DF	13	(Germany) Frans Krätzig		(substituted on) 62'
MF	5	(Germany) Yannik Keitel		(substituted on) 83'
MF	32	(Switzerland) Fabian Rieder
FW	11	(Germany) Nick Woltemade
FW	14	(Democratic Republic of the Congo) Silas Katompa Mvumpa		(substituted on) 62'
FW	17	(Germany) Justin Diehl		(substituted on) 77'
FW	26	(Germany) Deniz Undav		(substituted on) 62'
Manager:
(Germany) Sebastian Hoeneß

Man of the Match:
Deniz Undav (VfB Stuttgart)

Assistant referees:
Christian Gittelmann (Gauersheim)
Jonas Weickenmeier (Bad Homburg)
Fourth official:
Florian Exner (Münster)
Video assistant referee:
Pascal Müller (Freudental)
Assistant video assistant referee:
Justus Zorn (Freiburg)

**Match rules**

- 90 minutes
- Penalty shoot-out if scores level
- Maximum of nine named substitutes
- Maximum of five substitutions
- Maximum of three substitution opportunities

== See also ==
- 2024–25 Bundesliga
- 2024–25 DFB-Pokal
