= 2023–24 VfB Stuttgart season =

VfB Stuttgart
2023–24 season
- President: Claus Vogt
- Chairman: Alexander Wehrle
- Head coach: Sebastian Hoeneß
- Stadium: MHPArena
- Bundesliga: 2nd
- DFB-Pokal: Quarter-finals
- Top goalscorer: League: Serhou Guirassy (28); All: Serhou Guirassy (30)
- Highest home attendance: 60,000
- Average home league attendance: 55,118
Home colours	Away colours	Third colours

The 2023–24 season was VfB Stuttgart's 131st season in existence and fourth consecutive season in the Bundesliga. They also competed in the DFB-Pokal.

The club enjoyed a highly successful season under coach Sebastian Hoeneß, culminating in securing a UEFA Champions League spot for the first time since their last participation in 2009–10. In addition, five players were named in the Germany national team preliminary squad for the UEFA Euro 2024 including Alexander Nübel, Chris Führich, Maximilian Mittelstädt, Waldemar Anton and Deniz Undav, the highest number of players ever selected from the club in any major tournament. Despite spending most of the season in third place, the club secured second place on the final matchday, marking their best finish since winning the title in 2007.

== Players ==
=== First-team squad ===
As of 5 March 2024

Note: Flags indicate national team as defined under FIFA eligibility rules; some limited exceptions apply. Players may hold more than one non-FIFA nationality.

No.	Pos.	Nation	Player
1	GK	GER	Fabian Bredlow
2	DF	GER	Waldemar Anton (captain)
4	DF	GER	Josha Vagnoman
5	MF	SYR	Mahmoud Dahoud (on loan from Brighton & Hove Albion)
6	MF	GER	Angelo Stiller
7	DF	GER	Maximilian Mittelstädt
8	MF	FRA	Enzo Millot
9	FW	GUI	Serhou Guirassy
10	MF	KOR	Jeong Woo-yeong
14	FW	COD	Silas
15	DF	GER	Pascal Stenzel
16	MF	GER	Atakan Karazor (vice-captain)
17	MF	JPN	Genki Haraguchi
18	FW	GER	Jamie Leweling (on loan from Union Berlin)

No.	Pos.	Nation	Player
20	DF	SUI	Leonidas Stergiou (on loan from St. Gallen)
21	DF	JPN	Hiroki Ito
23	DF	FRA	Dan-Axel Zagadou
25	MF	GER	Lilian Egloff
26	FW	GER	Deniz Undav (on loan from Brighton & Hove Albion)
27	MF	GER	Chris Führich
28	MF	DEN	Nikolas Nartey
29	DF	FRA	Anthony Rouault
32	MF	GER	Roberto Massimo
33	GK	GER	Alexander Nübel (on loan from Bayern Munich)
36	MF	GER	Laurin Ulrich
41	GK	GER	Dennis Seimen
42	GK	GER	Florian Schock

=== Out on loan ===
Note: Flags indicate national team as defined under FIFA eligibility rules; some limited exceptions apply. Players may hold more than one non-FIFA nationality.

No.	Pos.	Nation	Player
—	FW	COL	Juan José Perea (at (Germany) Hansa Rostock until 30 June 2024)
—	MF	TUR	Ömer Faruk Beyaz (at (Turkey) Hatayspor until 30 June 2024)
—	MF	POR	Gil Dias (at (Poland) Legia Warsaw until 30 June 2024)
—	FW	NED	Mohamed Sankoh (at (Netherlands) Heracles Almelo until 30 June 2024)
—	DF	CRO	Matej Maglica (at (Germany) Darmstadt 98 until 30 June 2024)

No.	Pos.	Nation	Player
—	FW	DEN	Wahid Faghir (at (Germany) SV Elversberg until 30 June 2024)
—	FW	GER	Thomas Kastanaras (at (Germany) SSV Ulm until 30 June 2024)
—	FW	SRB	Jovan Milošević (at (Switzerland) St. Gallen until 30 June 2024)
—	FW	GER	Luca Pfeiffer (at (Germany) Darmstadt 98 until 30 June 2024)

== Transfers ==
=== In ===
Pos.	Player	Transferred from	Fee	Date	Source
FW	Serhou Guirassy (GUI)	Rennes (FRA)	€9,000,000	1 July 2023	
FW	Jovan Milošević (SRB)	Vojvodina (SRB)	€1,200,000	1 July 2023	
DF	Maximilian Mittelstädt (GER)	Hertha BSC (GER)	€500,000	1 July 2023	
DF	Matej Maglica (CRO)	St. Gallen (SUI)	€450,000	2 July 2023	
MF	Jeong Woo-yeong (KOR)	SC Freiburg (GER)	€3,000,000	11 July 2023	
MF	Jamie Leweling (GER)	Union Berlin (GER)	Loan	13 July 2023	
GK	Alexander Nübel (GER)	Bayern Munich (GER)	Loan	25 July 2023	
FW	Deniz Undav (GER)	Brighton & Hove Albion (ENG)	Loan	2 August 2023	
DF	Leonidas Stergiou (SUI)	St. Gallen (SUI)	Loan	22 August 2023	
MF	Angelo Stiller (GER)	1899 Hoffenheim (GER)	€5,500,000	25 August 2023	
DF	Anthony Rouault (FRA)	Toulouse (FRA)	Loan	1 September 2023	
MF	Mahmoud Dahoud (SYR)	Brighton & Hove Albion (ENG)	Loan	1 February 2024	

=== Out ===
Pos.	Player	Transferred to	Fee	Date	Source
DF	Antonis Aidonis (GER)	Aris (GRE)	Free	1 July 2023	
FW	Tanguy Coulibaly (FRA)	Montpellier (FRA)	Free	1 July 2023	
GK	Florian Müller (GER)	SC Freiburg (GER)	€1,500,000	1 July 2023	
DF	Matej Maglica (CRO)	Darmstadt 98 (GER)	Loan	2 July 2023	
FW	Alou Kuol (AUS)	Central Coast Mariners (AUS)	Undisclosed	10 July 2023	
FW	Wahid Faghir (DEN)	SV Elversberg (GER)	Loan	19 July 2023	
MF	Ömer Faruk Beyaz (TUR)	Hatayspor (TUR)	Loan	1 August 2023	
FW	Juan José Perea (COL)	Hansa Rostock (GER)	Loan	4 August 2023	
FW	Luca Pfeiffer (GER)	Darmstadt 98 (GER)	Loan	17 August 2023	
MF	Wataru Endō (JPN)	Liverpool (ENG)	€19,000,000	18 August 2023	
DF	Konstantinos Mavropanos (GRE)	West Ham United (ENG)	€20,000,000	22 August 2023	
DF	Clinton Mola (ENG)	Reading (ENG)	Free	26 August 2023	
FW	Mohamed Sankoh (NED)	Heracles Almelo (NED)	Loan	1 September 2023	
DF	Borna Sosa (CRO)	Ajax (NED)	€8,000,000	1 September 2023	
FW	Gil Dias (POR)	Legia Warsaw (POL)	Loan	4 September 2023	
MF	Mateo Klimowicz (GER)	Atlético San Luis (MEX)	€750,000	1 January 2024	
FW	Thomas Kastanaras (GER)	SSV Ulm (GER)	Loan	2 January 2024	
FW	Jovan Milošević (SRB)	St. Gallen (SUI)	Loan	14 February 2024	

== Pre-season and friendlies ==
Win Draw Loss Fixtures

9 July 2023 Friendly	Schwäbisch Hall	0–3	VfB Stuttgart	Schwäbisch Hall
15:00 CEST (UTC+2)		Report	Sankoh 77', 84'; Dias 81'	Stadium: Optima Sportpark; Attendance: 4,180

15 July 2023 Friendly	SSV Reutlingen	0–4	VfB Stuttgart	Reutlingen
15:00 CEST (UTC+2)		Report	Silas 22'; Führich 28'; Egloff 49'; Pfeiffer 51'	Stadium: Stadion an der Kreuzeiche

22 July 2023 Friendly	VfB Stuttgart	2–1	Vitesse	Zell am See, Austria
15:30 CEST (UTC+2)	Karazor 27'; Perea 78'	Report	Manhoef 47'	Stadium: Alois Latini Stadion

5 August 2023 Friendly	Sheffield United	0–3	VfB Stuttgart	Sheffield, England
13:00 BST (UTC+1)		Report	Guirassy 9', 14', 59'	Stadium: Bramall Lane; Attendance: 10,732

8 September 2023 Friendly	VfB Stuttgart	8–3	St. Gallen	Stuttgart
14:00 CEST (UTC+2)	Leweling 20', 50'; Millot 27'; Egloff 44'; Stiller 56'; Paula 66'; Kastanaras 72', 77' (pen.)	Report	Van Moos 13'; Krasniqi 62'; Karlen 87'	Stadium: Robert-Schlienz-Stadion; Attendance: 0

12 October 2023 Friendly	VfB Stuttgart	5–1	Wehen Wiesbaden	Stuttgart
14:00 CET (UTC+1)	Massimo 27', 30'; Undav 51'; Haraguchi 62'; Raimund 78'	Report	Iredale 54'	Stadium: Robert-Schlienz-Stadion; Attendance: 0

16 November 2023 Friendly	VfB Stuttgart	2–0	1. FC Nürnberg	Stuttgart
14:00 CET (UTC+1)	Haraguchi 48'; Egloff 56'	Report		Stadium: Robert-Schlienz-Stadion; Attendance: 700

6 January 2024 Friendly	VfB Stuttgart	6–1	Greuther Fürth	Stuttgart
15:00 CET (UTC+1)	Millot 20'; Führich 29', 46'; Leweling 58'; Milošević 99', 111'	Report	Srbeny 98'	Stadium: VfB-Clubzentrum; Attendance: 0
Note: Match was played in two periods of 60 minutes.

21 March 2024 Friendly	VfB Stuttgart	Cancelled	SV Elversberg	Stuttgart
13:30 CET (UTC+1)				Stadium: VfB-Clubzentrum
Note: The match was cancelled due to change of plans.

== Competitions ==
=== Overall record ===
Competition	First match	Last match	Starting round	Final position	Record							
Competition	First match	Last match	Starting round	Final position	Pld	W	D	L	GF	GA	GD	Win %
Bundesliga	19 August 2023	18 May 2024	Matchday 1	2nd	34	23	4	7	78	39	+39	67.65
DFB-Pokal	12 August 2023	6 February 2024	First round	Quarter-finals	4	3	0	1	9	3	+6	75.00
Total					38	26	4	8	87	42	+45	68.42

Source: Soccerway

=== Bundesliga ===
==== League table ====
Pos	Team	Pld	W	D	L	GF	GA	GD	Pts	Qualification or relegation
1	Bayer Leverkusen (C)	34	28	6	0	89	24	+65	90	Qualification for the Champions League league phase (Note: The Bundesliga gained an additional Champions League place as a result of Germany finishing as one of the two associations with the highest UEFA coefficient points in 2023–24.)
2	VfB Stuttgart	34	23	4	7	78	39	+39	73	Qualification for the Champions League league phase
3	Bayern Munich	34	23	3	8	94	45	+49	72	Qualification for the Champions League league phase
4	RB Leipzig	34	19	8	7	77	39	+38	65	Qualification for the Champions League league phase
5	Borussia Dortmund	34	18	9	7	68	43	+25	63	Qualification for the Champions League league phase

Source: DFB
Rules for classification: 1) Points; 2) Goal difference; 3) Goals scored; 4) Head-to-head results; 5) Head-to-head away goals scored; 6) Away goals scored; 7) Play-off.
(C) Champions

==== Results summary ====
Overall								Home						Away					
Pld	W	D	L	GF	GA	GD	Pts	W	D	L	GF	GA	GD	W	D	L	GF	GA	GD
34	23	4	7	78	39	+39	73	13	3	1	50	15	+35	10	1	6	28	24	+4

Source: DFB

==== Results by round ====
Round	1	2	3	4	5	6	7	8	9	10	11	12	13	14	15	16	17	18	19	20	21	22	23	24	25	26	27	28	29	30	31	32	33	34
Ground	H	A	H	A	H	A	H	A	H	A	H	A	H	H	A	H	A	A	H	A	H	A	H	A	H	A	H	A	H	A	A	H	A	H
Result	W	L	W	W	W	W	W	W	L	L	W	W	W	D	L	W	L	L	W	W	W	W	D	W	W	W	D	W	W	L	D	W	W	W
Position	1	9	3	4	3	2	2	2	3	3	3	3	3	3	4	3	3	3	3	3	3	3	3	3	3	3	3	3	3	3	3	3	3	2

Source: DFB
A = Away; H = Home; W = Win; D = Draw; L = Loss

==== Matches ====
The league fixtures were unveiled on 30 June 2023.

19 August 2023 1	VfB Stuttgart	5–0	VfL Bochum	Stuttgart
15:30 CEST (UTC+2)	Guirassy 18', 77'; Zagadou 38', (yellow card) 45+4'; Silas 59', 67'	Report	Antwi-Adjei (yellow card) 45+1'	Stadium: MHPArena; Attendance: 53,000; Referee: Daniel Siebert

25 August 2023 2	RB Leipzig	5–1	VfB Stuttgart	Leipzig
20:30 CEST (UTC+2)	Henrichs 51'; Schlager (yellow card) 61'; Olmo 63'; Openda 66'; Kampl 74'; Simons 76'	Report	Guirassy 35'; Egloff (yellow card) 65'	Stadium: Red Bull Arena; Attendance: 46,084; Referee: Frank Willenborg

2 September 2023 3	VfB Stuttgart	5–0	SC Freiburg	Stuttgart
15:30 CEST (UTC+2)	Führich 8', 62'; Guirassy 17', 19'; Itō (yellow card) 38'; Millot 75'	Report	Philipp (yellow card) 86'	Stadium: MHPArena; Attendance: 54,300; Referee: Felix Brych

16 September 2023 4	Mainz 05	1–3	VfB Stuttgart	Mainz
15:30 CEST (UTC+2)	Caci (yellow card) 11'; Barreiro 70'	Report	Guirassy 56', 84', 90+7'; Stiller (yellow card) 60'; Anton (yellow card) 67'	Stadium: Mewa Arena; Attendance: 30,500; Referee: Harm Osmers

22 September 2023 5	VfB Stuttgart	3–1	Darmstadt 98	Stuttgart
20:30 CEST (UTC+2)	Millot 23'; Guirassy 32', 90+3'; Undav (yellow card) 90'	Report	Pfeiffer (yellow card) 8'; Zagadou 17' (o.g.); Holland (yellow card) 45+1'; Riedel (yellow card) 62'; Skarke (yellow card) 71'; Stojilković (yellow card) 77'; Schnellhardt (yellow card) 86'	Stadium: MHPArena; Attendance: 54,000; Referee: Matthias Jöllenbeck

30 September 2023 6	1. FC Köln	0–2	VfB Stuttgart	Cologne
15:30 CEST (UTC+2)	Ljubičić (yellow card) 26'; Huseinbašić (yellow card) 55'	Report	Undav 68', 88'; Millot (yellow card) 79'	Stadium: RheinEnergieStadion; Attendance: 50,000; Referee: Tobias Stieler

7 October 2023 7	VfB Stuttgart	3–1	VfL Wolfsburg	Stuttgart
15:30 CEST (UTC+2)	Guirassy 66' (pen.), 78', 82'; Undav (yellow card) 90+4'	Report	Svanberg (yellow card) 5'; Gerhardt 34'; Wind (yellow card) 42'; Vranckx (yellow card) 73'	Stadium: MHPArena; Attendance: 52,000; Referee: Daniel Siebert

21 October 2023 8	Union Berlin	0–3	VfB Stuttgart	Berlin
15:30 CEST (UTC+2)	Haberer (yellow card) 34'; Behrens (yellow card) 49'	Report	Guirassy 16'; Rouault (yellow card) 34'; Silas 81'; Undav 88'	Stadium: Stadion An der Alten Försterei; Attendance: 22,012; Referee: Bastian Dankert

28 October 2023 9	VfB Stuttgart	2–3	1899 Hoffenheim	Stuttgart
15:30 CEST (UTC+2)	Rouault (yellow card) 21'; Undav (penalty missed) 30', 74'; Führich 61', (yellow card) 80'	Report	Prömel 5'; Akpoguma (yellow card) 17'; Weghorst 21' (pen.); Skov 66'	Stadium: MHPArena; Attendance: 53,200; Referee: Felix Zwayer

5 November 2023 10	1. FC Heidenheim	2–0	VfB Stuttgart	Heidenheim
17:30 CET (UTC+1)	Theuerkauf (yellow card) 44'; Schöppner 70'; Dinkçi (yellow card) 75'; Kleindienst 90+4'	Report	Silas (penalty missed) 57'; Karazor (yellow card) 67'; Anton (yellow card) 74'	Stadium: Voith-Arena; Attendance: 15,000; Referee: Florian Badstübner

11 November 2023 11	VfB Stuttgart	2–1	Borussia Dortmund	Stuttgart
15:30 CET (UTC+1)	Führich (penalty missed) 11'; Undav (yellow card) 15', (goal) 42'; Karazor (yellow card) 59'; Guirassy 83' (pen.)	Report	Kobel (yellow card) 10'; Adeyemi (yellow card) 15'; Füllkrug 36'; Sabitzer (yellow card) 49'	Stadium: MHPArena; Attendance: 55,000; Referee: Tobias Stieler

25 November 2023 12	Eintracht Frankfurt	1–2	VfB Stuttgart	Frankfurt
18:30 CET (UTC+1)	Anton 26' (o.g.)	Report	Undav 1', 45+1'; Mittelstädt (yellow card) 90+5'	Stadium: Deutsche Bank Park; Attendance: 58,000; Referee: Felix Brych

2 December 2023 13	VfB Stuttgart	2–0	Werder Bremen	Stuttgart
18:30 CET (UTC+1)	Undav 17'; Guirassy 75' (pen.); Stenzel (yellow card) 86'	Report		Stadium: MHPArena; Attendance: 54,500; Referee: Bastian Dankert

10 December 2023 14	VfB Stuttgart	1–1	Bayer Leverkusen	Stuttgart
15:30 CET (UTC+1)	Führich 10'; Karazor (yellow card) 65'	Report	Kossounou (yellow card) 6'; Wirtz 47'	Stadium: MHPArena; Attendance: 54,500; Referee: Deniz Aytekin

17 December 2023 15	Bayern Munich	3–0	VfB Stuttgart	Munich
19:30 CET (UTC+1)	Kane 2', 55'; Kim 63'	Report	Mittelstädt (yellow card) 31'; Karazor (yellow card) 69'; Leweling (yellow card) 82'	Stadium: Allianz Arena; Attendance: 75,000; Referee: Tobias Stieler

20 December 2023 16	VfB Stuttgart	3–0	FC Augsburg	Stuttgart
20:30 CET (UTC+1)	Undav 18'; Guirassy 45+1'; Führich 69'	Report	Demirović (yellow card) 12'; Gumny (yellow card) 62'; Valentin (yellow card) 71'; Dorsch (yellow card) 81'	Stadium: MHPArena; Attendance: 53,600; Referee: Daniel Siebert

14 January 2024 17	Borussia Mönchengladbach	3–1	VfB Stuttgart	Mönchengladbach
17:30 CET (UTC+1)	Hack 1', 19'; Weigl (yellow card) 35'; Elvedi (yellow card) 70'; Pefok 90+1'; Kramer (yellow card) 90+5'	Report	Mittelstädt (yellow card) 45+3'; Vagnoman 56'; Millot (yellow card) 83'; Raimund (yellow card) 84'	Stadium: Borussia-Park; Attendance: 53,429; Referee: Harm Osmers

20 January 2024 18	VfL Bochum	1–0	VfB Stuttgart	Bochum
15:30 CET (UTC+1)	Bernardo (yellow card) 36'; Antwi-Adjei (yellow card) 41'; Förster (yellow card) 42'; Bero 50'; Wittek (yellow card) 90+5'; Broschinski (yellow card) 90+6'	Report	Karazor (yellow card) 35'; Massimo (yellow card) 90+1'; Vagnoman (yellow card) 90+5'	Stadium: Vonovia Ruhrstadion; Attendance: 26,000; Referee: Bastian Dankert

27 January 2024 19	VfB Stuttgart	5–2	RB Leipzig	Stuttgart
15:30 CET (UTC+1)	Millot 25' (pen.); Undav 30', 56', 75'; Leweling 48'; Anton (yellow card) 69'	Report	Schlager (yellow card) 5'; Simakan (yellow card) 16'; Šeško 32'; Baumgartner (yellow card) 43'; Openda 55'; Raum (yellow card) 79'	Stadium: MHPArena; Attendance: 52,100; Referee: Sven Jablonski

3 February 2024 20	SC Freiburg	1–3	VfB Stuttgart	Freiburg
15:30 CET (UTC+1)	Röhl (red card) 18'; Ginter (yellow card) 41'; Eggestein (yellow card) 45+4'; Kübler 45+11', (yellow card) 90'; Philipp (yellow card) 90+9'	Report	Undav 3'; Führich 7'; Mittelstädt (yellow card) 72', (goal) 74'; Stiller (yellow card) 90+9'	Stadium: Europa-Park Stadion; Attendance: 34,700; Referee: Daniel Siebert

11 February 2024 21	VfB Stuttgart	3–1	Mainz 05	Stuttgart
15:30 CET (UTC+1)	Mittelstadt 45+2'; Leweling 45+5'; Undav 73'; Karazor (yellow card) 82'	Report	Ajorque 76'; Guilavogui (yellow card) 84'	Stadium: MHPArena; Attendance: 52,500; Referee: Deniz Aytekin

17 February 2024 22	Darmstadt 98	1–2	VfB Stuttgart	Darmstadt
15:30 CET (UTC+1)	Klarer (yellow card) 45+14'; Zimmermann (yellow card) 67'; Brunst (yellow card) 69'; Justvan (yellow card) 90'; Seydel 90+5'	Report	Guirassy 14'; Stenzel (yellow card) 45+13' (yellow-red card) 45+22'; Leweling (yellow card) 45+24'; Führich (yellow card) 67'; Karazor (yellow card) 71'; Dahoud 90+2'	Stadium: Merck-Stadion am Böllenfalltor; Attendance: 17,810; Referee: Tobias Welz

24 February 2024 23	VfB Stuttgart	1–1	1. FC Köln	Stuttgart
15:30 CET (UTC+1)	Rouault (yellow card) 42'; Millot 53'	Report	Martel 62'	Stadium: MHPArena; Attendance: 54,500; Referee: Patrick Ittrich

2 March 2024 24	VfL Wolfsburg	2–3	VfB Stuttgart	Wolfsburg
18:30 CET (UTC+1)	Arnold (yellow card) 3'; Baku (yellow card) 22'; Mæhle 50', (yellow card) 52'; Nmecha 83'	Report	Guirassy 14', 54' (pen.); Anton (yellow card) 58'; Vagnoman 78'	Stadium: Volkswagen Arena; Attendance: 28,917; Referee: Benjamin Brand

8 March 2024 25	VfB Stuttgart	2–0	Union Berlin	Stuttgart
20:30 CET (UTC+1)	Guirassy 19'; Führich 65'; Vagnoman (yellow card) 84'	Report	Khedira (yellow card) 39'; Schäfer (red card) 69'; Tousart (yellow card) 77'	Stadium: MHPArena; Attendance: 53,800; Referee: Robert Schröder

16 March 2024 26	1899 Hoffenheim	0–3	VfB Stuttgart	Sinsheim
18:30 CET (UTC+1)	Kadeřábek (yellow card) 45+3'	Report	Millot 16'; Guirassy 45+1'; Leweling 68'	Stadium: Rhein-Neckar-Arena; Attendance: 30,150; Referee: Sascha Stegemann

31 March 2024 27	VfB Stuttgart	3–3	1. FC Heidenheim	Stuttgart
17:30 CEST (UTC+2)	Guirassy 41'; Stiller 53'; Anton (yellow card) 90+3'; Undav 90+8'	Report	Nübel 62' (o.g.); Kleindienst 84', 85'; Dovedan (red card) 90+6'	Stadium: MHPArena; Attendance: 60,000; Referee: Felix Zwayer

6 April 2024 28	Borussia Dortmund	0–1	VfB Stuttgart	Dortmund
18:30 CEST (UTC+2)	Brandt (yellow card) 45+1'; Adeyemi (yellow card) 72'	Report	Stiller (yellow card) 9'; Millot (yellow card) 26'; Guirassy 64'; Karazor (yellow card) 71'; Nübel (yellow card) 85'	Stadium: Signal Iduna Park; Attendance: 81,365; Referee: Matthias Jöllenbeck

13 April 2024 29	VfB Stuttgart	3–0	Eintracht Frankfurt	Stuttgart
18:30 CEST (UTC+2)	Guirassy 11'; Undav 17'; Leweling 37'; Stiller (yellow card) 74'	Report	Nkounkou (yellow card) 23'; Knauff (yellow card) 25'; Hasebe (yellow card) 50'	Stadium: MHPArena; Attendance: 60,000; Referee: Deniz Aytekin

21 April 2024 30	Werder Bremen	2–1	VfB Stuttgart	Bremen
13:30 CEST (UTC+2)	Ducksch 28' (pen.), 49'; Bittencourt (yellow card) 51'; Zetterer (yellow card) 68'; Agu (yellow card) 74'	Report	Leweling (yellow card) 27'; Millot (yellow card) 35'; Stiller (yellow card) 53'; Undav 71'	Stadium: Weserstadion; Attendance: 42,100; Referee: Robert Schröder

27 April 2024 31	Bayer Leverkusen	2–2	VfB Stuttgart	Leverkusen
18:30 CEST (UTC+2)	Palacios (yellow card) 31'; Kossounou (yellow card) 41'; Andrich (yellow card) 58', (goal) 90+6'; Adli 61'; Hincapié (yellow card) 84'	Report	Undav (yellow card) 42', (goal) 57'; Führich 47'; Millot (yellow card) 69'; Mittelstädt (yellow card) 77'	Stadium: BayArena; Attendance: 30,210; Referee: Felix Zwayer

4 May 2024 32	VfB Stuttgart	3–1	Bayern Munich	Stuttgart
15:30 CEST (UTC+2)	Anton (yellow card) 24'; Stergiou 29'; Jeong 83'; Silas 90+3'	Report	Dier (yellow card) 20'; Kane 37' (pen.); Pavlović (yellow card) 78'	Stadium: MHPArena; Attendance: 60,000; Referee: Tobias Welz

10 May 2024 33	FC Augsburg	0–1	VfB Stuttgart	Augsburg
20:30 CEST (UTC+2)	Demirović (yellow card) 63'; Mbabu (yellow card) 76'; Iago (yellow card) 82'; Gouweleeuw (yellow card) 90+5'	Report	Anton (yellow card) 42'; Guirassy 48'; Jeong (yellow card) 72'	Stadium: WWK Arena; Attendance: 30,660; Referee: Patrick Ittrich

18 May 2024 34	VfB Stuttgart	4–0	Borussia Mönchengladbach	Stuttgart
15:30 CEST (UTC+2)	Guirassy 23', 31'; Jeong 75'; Silas 83'; Undav (yellow card) 90+3'	Report	Friedrich (yellow card) 56'; Herrmann (yellow card) 89'	Stadium: MHPArena; Attendance: 60,000; Referee: Daniel Schlager

=== DFB-Pokal ===
12 August 2023 First round	TSG Balingen	0–4	VfB Stuttgart	Reutlingen
13:00 CEST (UTC+2)		Report	Millot 25'; Silas 34'; Guirassy 43'; Endō 55'	Stadium: Stadion an der Kreuzeiche; Attendance: 13,400; Referee: Robert Kampka
Note: The match took place at the Stadion an der Kreuzeiche, instead of TSG Balingen's home stadium, the Bizerba-Arena in Balingen.

31 October 2023 Second round	VfB Stuttgart	1–0	Union Berlin	Stuttgart
18:00 CET (UTC+1)	Undav 45'; Stergiou (yellow card) 88'; Itō (yellow card) 90+1'	Report	Tousart (yellow card) 85'; Gosens (yellow card) 90+1'	Stadium: MHPArena; Attendance: 54,000; Referee: Sascha Stegemann

6 December 2023 Round of 16	VfB Stuttgart	2–0	Borussia Dortmund	Stuttgart
20:45 CET (UTC+1)	Guirassy 55'; Anton (yellow card) 64'; Silas 77'; Karazor (yellow card) 90+2'	Report	Bensebaini (yellow card) 68'	Stadium: MHPArena; Attendance: 54,500; Referee: Benjamin Brand

6 February 2024 Quarter-finals	Bayer Leverkusen	3–2	VfB Stuttgart	Leverkusen
20:45 CET (UTC+1)	Andrich (yellow card) 18', (goal) 50'; Frimpong (yellow card) 34'; Adli 66'; Tah 90'	Report	Anton 11'; Mittelstädt (yellow card) 25'; Führich 58'	Stadium: BayArena; Attendance: 30,210; Referee: Daniel Schlager

== Statistics ==
=== Appearances and goals ===
No.	Pos	Nat	Player	Total		Bundesliga		DFB-Pokal	
No.	Pos	Nat	Player	Apps	Goals	Apps	Goals	Apps	Goals
Goalkeepers
1	GK	(Germany) GER	Fabian Bredlow	3	0	3	0	0	0
33	GK	(Germany) GER	Alexander Nübel	32	0	28	0	4	0
41	GK	(Germany) GER	Dennis Seimen	0	0	0	0	0	0
42	GK	(Germany) GER	Fabian Schock	0	0	0	0	0	0
Defenders
2	DF	(Germany) GER	Waldemar Anton	35	1	30+1	0	4	1
4	DF	(Germany) GER	Josha Vagnoman	20	2	12+6	2	2	0
7	DF	(Germany) GER	Maximilian Mittelstädt	32	2	21+8	2	2+1	0
15	DF	(Germany) GER	Pascal Stenzel	24	0	14+8	0	2	0
20	DF	(Switzerland) SUI	Leonidas Stergiou	17	1	5+9	1	0+3	0
21	DF	(Japan) JPN	Hiroki Itō	27	0	23+1	0	3	0
23	DF	(France) FRA	Dan-Axel Zagadou	22	1	16+3	1	3	0
29	DF	(France) FRA	Anthony Rouault	22	0	11+9	0	1+1	0
Midfielders
5	MF	(Syria) SYR	Mahmoud Dahoud	14	1	1+12	1	0+1	0
6	MF	(Germany) GER	Angelo Stiller	32	1	28+1	1	3	0
8	MF	(France) FRA	Enzo Millot	33	6	25+4	5	3+1	1
10	MF	(South Korea) KOR	Jeong Woo-yeong	27	1	5+19	1	1+2	0
16	MF	(Germany) GER	Atakan Karazor	35	0	30+1	0	4	0
17	MF	(Japan) JPN	Genki Haraguchi	2	0	0+1	0	0+1	0
25	MF	(Germany) GER	Lilian Egloff	6	0	1+4	0	0+1	0
27	MF	(Germany) GER	Chris Führich	35	9	31+1	8	3	1
28	MF	(Denmark) DEN	Nikolas Nartey	0	0	0	0	0	0
32	MF	(Germany) GER	Roberto Massimo	6	0	0+5	0	0+1	0
36	MF	(Germany) GER	Laurin Ulrich	0	0	0	0	0	0
40	MF	(Germany) GER	Luca Raimund	3	0	0+3	0	0	0
46	MF	(Germany) GER	Samuele Di Benedetto	1	0	0+1	0	0	0
Forwards
9	FW	(Guinea) GUI	Serhou Guirassy	28	27	23+3	25	2	2
14	FW	(Democratic Republic of the Congo) COD	Silas	28	6	8+17	4	1+2	2
18	FW	(Germany) GER	Jamie Leweling	36	4	15+17	4	1+3	0
26	FW	(Germany) GER	Deniz Undav	31	19	21+7	18	3	1
Players transferred out during the season
3	MF	(Japan) JPN	Wataru Endō	1	1	0	0	1	1
5	DF	(Greece) GRE	Konstantinos Mavropanos	0	0	0	0	0	0
19	FW	(Serbia) SRB	Jovan Milošević	6	0	0+5	0	0+1	0
20	FW	(Germany) GER	Luca Pfeiffer	0	0	0	0	0	0
22	FW	(Germany) GER	Thomas Kastanaras	0	0	0	0	0	0
24	DF	(Croatia) CRO	Borna Sosa	2	0	0+2	0	0	0
31	FW	(Portugal) POR	Gil Dias	0	0	0	0	0	0
35	MF	(England) ENG	Clinton Mola	0	0	0	0	0	0
44	FW	(Netherlands) NED	Mohamed Sankoh	0	0	0	0	0	0

Last updated: 4 May 2024
Source: Competitions

=== Goalscorers ===
Rank	Pos.	No.	Nat.	Player	Bundesliga	DFB-Pokal	Total
1	FW	9	(Guinea)	Serhou Guirassy	28	2	30
2	FW	26	(Germany)	Deniz Undav	18	1	19
3	MF	27	(Germany)	Chris Führich	8	1	9
4	FW	14	(Democratic Republic of the Congo)	Silas	5	2	7
5	MF	8	(France)	Enzo Millot	5	1	6
6	FW	18	(Germany)	Jamie Leweling	4	0	4
7	DF	4	(Germany)	Josha Vagnoman	2	0	2
7	DF	7	(Germany)	Maximilian Mittelstädt	2	0	2
7	MF	10	(South Korea)	Jeong Woo-yeong	2	0	2
10	DF	2	(Germany)	Waldemar Anton	0	1	1
10	MF	3	(Japan)	Wataru Endō	0	1	1
10	MF	5	(Syria)	Mahmoud Dahoud	1	0	1
10	MF	6	(Germany)	Angelo Stiller	1	0	1
10	DF	20	(Switzerland)	Leonidas Stergiou	1	0	1
10	DF	23	(France)	Dan-Axel Zagadou	1	0	1
Own goals					0	0	0
Totals					78	9	87
