= 2024–25 VfB Stuttgart season =

VfB Stuttgart
2024–25 season
- President: Claus Vogt
- Chairman: Alexander Wehrle
- Head coach: Sebastian Hoeneß
- Stadium: MHPArena
- Bundesliga: 9th
- DFB-Pokal: Winners
- DFL-Supercup: Runners-up
- UEFA Champions League: League phase
- Top goalscorer: League: Ermedin Demirović (15); All: Ermedin Demirović (17)
- Average home league attendance: 59,265
Home colours	Away colours	Third colours

The 2024–25 season was the 132nd season in the history of VfB Stuttgart, and the club's fifth consecutive season in the Bundesliga. In addition to the domestic league, the club participated in the DFB-Pokal, the DFL-Supercup, and the UEFA Champions League.

On 24 May 2025, Stuttgart defeated Arminia Bielefeld 4–2 in the DFB-Pokal final, winning a first major trophy since 2007 and thus earning qualification to the 2025–26 UEFA Europa League.

== Players ==
=== First-team squad ===
As of 3 February 2025

Note: Flags indicate national team as defined under FIFA eligibility rules; some limited exceptions apply. Players may hold more than one non-FIFA nationality.

No.	Pos.	Nation	Player
1	GK	GER	Fabian Bredlow
2	DF	BEL	Ameen Al-Dakhil
3	DF	NED	Ramon Hendriks
4	DF	GER	Josha Vagnoman
5	MF	GER	Yannik Keitel
6	MF	GER	Angelo Stiller (3rd captain)
7	DF	GER	Maximilian Mittelstädt
8	MF	FRA	Enzo Millot
9	FW	BIH	Ermedin Demirović
10	FW	MLI	El Bilal Touré (on loan from Atalanta)
11	FW	GER	Nick Woltemade
14	DF	SUI	Luca Jaquez
15	DF	GER	Pascal Stenzel
16	MF	TUR	Atakan Karazor (captain)
17	FW	GER	Justin Diehl
18	FW	GER	Jamie Leweling
19	FW	DEN	Wahid Faghir

No.	Pos.	Nation	Player
20	DF	SUI	Leonidas Stergiou
21	GK	GER	Stefan Drljača
22	FW	GER	Thomas Kastanaras
23	DF	FRA	Dan-Axel Zagadou
24	DF	GER	Jeff Chabot
25	FW	DEN	Jacob Bruun Larsen
26	FW	GER	Deniz Undav (vice-captain)
27	MF	GER	Chris Führich
28	MF	DEN	Nikolas Nartey
29	DF	GER	Finn Jeltsch
32	MF	SUI	Fabian Rieder (on loan from Rennes)
33	GK	GER	Alexander Nübel (on loan from Bayern Munich)
36	MF	GER	Laurin Ulrich
40	FW	GER	Luca Raimund
41	GK	GER	Dennis Seimen
45	DF	JPN	Anrie Chase
53	FW	NED	Mohamed Sankoh

=== Out on loan ===
Note: Flags indicate national team as defined under FIFA eligibility rules; some limited exceptions apply. Players may hold more than one non-FIFA nationality.

No.	Pos.	Nation	Player
—	FW	KOR	Jeong Woo-yeong (at (Germany) Union Berlin until 30 June 2025)
—	FW	SRB	Jovan Milošević (at (Serbia) Partizan until 30 June 2025)
—	FW	COL	Juan José Perea (at (Switzerland) Zürich until 30 June 2025)

No.	Pos.	Nation	Player
—	FW	GER	Luca Pfeiffer (at (Germany) Karlsruher SC until 30 June 2025)
—	FW	COD	Silas (at (Serbia) Red Star Belgrade until 30 June 2025)

== Transfers ==
=== In ===
Pos.	Player	Transferred from	Fee	Date	Source
MF	(Turkey) Ömer Faruk Beyaz	(Turkey) Hatayspor	Loan return	30 June 2024	
MF	(Portugal) Gil Dias	(Poland) Legia Warsaw	Loan return	30 June 2024	
FW	(Denmark) Wahid Faghir	(Germany) SV Elversberg	Loan return	30 June 2024	
FW	(Greece) Thomas Kastanaras	(Germany) SSV Ulm	Loan return	30 June 2024	
FW	(Colombia) Juan José Perea	(Germany) Hansa Rostock	Loan return	30 June 2024	
FW	(Germany) Luca Pfeiffer	(Germany) Darmstadt 98	Loan return	30 June 2024	
FW	(Netherlands) Mohamed Sankoh	(Netherlands) Heracles Almelo	Loan return	30 June 2024	
GK	(Germany) Stefan Drljača	(Germany) Dynamo Dresden	Undisclosed	1 July 2024	
GK	(Germany) Alexander Nübel	(Germany) Bayern Munich	Loan	1 July 2024	
DF	(Germany) Jeff Chabot	(Germany) 1. FC Köln	€4,000,000	1 July 2024	
DF	(Netherlands) Ramon Hendriks	(Netherlands) Feyenoord	€700,000	1 July 2024	
DF	(Germany) Frans Krätzig	(Germany) Bayern Munich	Loan (€500,000)	1 July 2024	
DF	(France) Anthony Rouault	(France) Toulouse	€3,000,000	1 July 2024	
DF	(Switzerland) Leonidas Stergiou	(Switzerland) St. Gallen	€2,000,000	1 July 2024	
MF	(Germany) Yannik Keitel	(Germany) SC Freiburg	Free	1 July 2024	
MF	(Germany) Jamie Leweling	(Germany) Union Berlin	€5,100,000	1 July 2024	
MF	(Switzerland) Fabian Rieder	(France) Rennes	Loan	1 July 2024	
FW	(Germany) Justin Diehl	(Germany) 1. FC Köln	Free	1 July 2024	
FW	(Germany) Nick Woltemade	(Germany) Werder Bremen	Free	1 July 2024	
FW	(Bosnia and Herzegovina) Ermedin Demirović	(Germany) FC Augsburg	€21,000,000	16 July 2024	
FW	(Germany) Deniz Undav	(England) Brighton & Hove Albion	€26,700,000	9 August 2024	
FW	(Mali) El Bilal Touré	(Italy) Atalanta	Loan	23 August 2024	
DF	(Belgium) Ameen Al-Dakhil	(England) Burnley	Undisclosed	27 August 2024	
FW	(Denmark) Jacob Bruun Larsen	(Germany) TSG Hoffenheim	€1,700,000	8 January 2025	
DF	(Switzerland) Luca Jaquez	(Switzerland) Luzern	€5,500,000	3 February 2025	
DF	(Germany) Finn Jeltsch	(Germany) 1. FC Nürnberg	€9,500,000	3 February 2025	

=== Out ===
Pos.	Player	Transferred to	Fee	Date	Source
MF	(Syria) Mahmoud Dahoud	(England) Brighton & Hove Albion	End of loan	30 June 2024	
FW	(Germany) Deniz Undav	(England) Brighton & Hove Albion	End of loan	30 June 2024	
GK	(Germany) Florian Schock	(Germany) Fortuna Düsseldorf	End of contract	1 July 2024	
DF	(Japan) Hiroki Itō	(Germany) Bayern Munich	€30,000,000	1 July 2024	
DF	(Croatia) Matej Maglica	(Germany) Darmstadt 98	Undisclosed	1 July 2024	
MF	(Germany) Laurin Ulrich	(Germany) SSV Ulm	Loan	1 July 2024	
MF	(Japan) Genki Haraguchi	(Japan) Urawa Red Diamonds	End of contract	1 July 2024	
FW	(Germany) Dejan Galjen	(Germany) Jahn Regensburg	Undisclosed	1 July 2024	
FW	(Germany) Roberto Massimo	(Germany) Greuther Fürth	End of contract	1 July 2024	
FW	(Serbia) Jovan Milošević	(Switzerland) St. Gallen	Loan	1 July 2024	
FW	(Colombia) Juan José Perea	(Switzerland) Zürich	Loan	1 July 2024	
MF	(Portugal) Gil Dias	(Portugal) Famalicão	Undisclosed	2 July 2024	
DF	(Germany) Waldemar Anton	(Germany) Borussia Dortmund	€22,500,000	8 July 2024	
FW	(Guinea) Serhou Guirassy	(Germany) Borussia Dortmund	€17,500,000	18 July 2024	
FW	(Netherlands) Mohamed Sankoh	(Italy) Cosenza	Loan	21 August 2024	
MF	(South Korea) Jeong Woo-yeong	(Germany) Union Berlin	Loan	27 August 2024	
FW	(Germany) Luca Pfeiffer	(Germany) Karlsruher SC	Loan	27 August 2024	
MF	(Turkey) Ömer Faruk Beyaz	(Turkey) İstanbul Başakşehir	Contract terminated	30 August 2024	
FW	(Democratic Republic of the Congo) Silas	(Serbia) Red Star Belgrade	Loan	3 September 2024	
DF	(Germany) Frans Krätzig	(Germany) Bayern Munich	Loan terminated	2 January 2025	
FW	(Serbia) Jovan Milošević	(Serbia) Partizan	Loan	16 January 2025	
DF	(France) Anthony Rouault	(France) Rennes	€13,000,000	3 February 2025	

== Friendlies ==
=== Pre-season ===
The team participated in the third edition of the Japan Bundesliga Tour from 26 July to 1 August, as announced on 9 May 2024.

7 July 2024 Friendly	FSV Hollenbach	1–8	VfB Stuttgart	Mulfingen
15:00 CEST (UTC+2)	Dörr 63' (pen.)	Report	Stenzel 11'; Silas 30', 35'; Leweling 40'; Faghir 48'; Diehl 56'; Kastanaras 57', 74'	Stadium: Jako-Arena; Attendance: 3,500

13 July 2024 Friendly	Luzern	0–0	VfB Stuttgart	Lucerne, Switzerland
15:00 CEST (UTC+2)		Report	Chabot (yellow card) 38'	Stadium: Swissporarena; Attendance: 5,850

20 July 2024 Friendly	VfB Stuttgart	3–0	Fortuna Sittard	Heilbronn
14:00 CEST (UTC+2)	Silas 12'; Leweling 17'; Diehl 66'	Report		Stadium: Frankenstadion; Attendance: 5,500
Note: Match was played in two periods of sixty minutes each.

28 July 2024 Bundesliga Japan Tour	Kyoto Sanga	3–5	VfB Stuttgart	Kyoto, Japan
19:00 JST (UTC+9)	Elias 21'; Marco Túlio 34'; Hara 46'	Report	Diehl 58'; Leweling 68'; Kastanaras 73'; Cissé 79'; Raimund 90'	Stadium: Sanga Stadium by Kyocera; Attendance: 8,545

1 August 2024 Bundesliga Japan Tour	Sanfrecce Hiroshima	2–5	VfB Stuttgart	Hiroshima, Japan
18:30 JST (UTC+9)	Nakajima 55'; Marcos Júnior 76'	Report	Stiller 17'; Beyaz 63'; Kastanaras 68'; Woltemade 78'; Cissé 90'	Stadium: Edion Peace Wing Hiroshima; Attendance: 20,026; Referee: Hiroki Kasahara (Japan)

10 August 2024 Friendly	VfB Stuttgart	4–0	Athletic Bilbao	Stuttgart
15:30 CEST (UTC+2)	Silas 11', 49'; Demirović 14'; Woltemade 79'	Report	Herrera (yellow card) 15'	Stadium: MHPArena; Attendance: 50,000; Referee: Daniel Schlager (Germany)

=== Mid-season ===
5 September 2024 Friendly	VfB Stuttgart	4–1	1. FC Kaiserslautern	Stuttgart
15:00 CEST (UTC+2)	Stenzel 35'; Leweling 67' (pen.); Münst 72', 83'	Report	Robinson (yellow card) 47'; Mause 87'	Stadium: Robert-Schlienz-Stadion; Attendance: 3,000

10 October 2024 Friendly	VfB Stuttgart	1–1	SSV Ulm	Stuttgart
14:00 CEST (UTC+2)	Münst 62'	Report	Keller 26'	Stadium: Robert-Schlienz-Stadion; Attendance: 0

5 January 2025 Friendly	VfB Stuttgart	2–2	Ajax	Stuttgart
14:00 CET (UTC+1)	Stiller 13'; Führich 19'; Millot (yellow card) 25'	Report	Chabot 52' (o.g.); Klaassen (red card) 56'; Akpom 85'	Stadium: Robert-Schlienz-Stadion; Attendance: 3,000; Referee: Christian Ballweg (Germany)
Note: Despite receiving a red card, Klaassen was allowed to stay on the pitch following consultation between both managers.

== Competitions ==
=== Overall record ===
Competition	First match	Last match	Starting round	Final position	Record							
Competition	First match	Last match	Starting round	Final position	Pld	W	D	L	GF	GA	GD	Win %
Bundesliga	24 August 2024	17 May 2025	Matchday 1	9th	34	14	8	12	64	53	+11	41.18
DFB-Pokal	27 August 2024	24 May 2025	First round	Winners	6	6	0	0	18	4	+14	100.00
DFL-Supercup	17 August 2024		Final	Runners-up	1	0	1	0	2	2	+0	0.00
UEFA Champions League	17 September 2024	29 January 2025	League phase	League phase	8	3	1	4	13	17	−4	37.50
Total					49	23	10	16	97	76	+21	46.94

Source: Soccerway

=== Bundesliga ===
==== League table ====
Pos	Team	Pld	W	D	L	GF	GA	GD	Pts	Qualification or relegation
7	RB Leipzig	34	13	12	9	53	48	+5	51	
8	Werder Bremen	34	14	9	11	54	57	−3	51	
9	VfB Stuttgart	34	14	8	12	64	53	+11	50	Qualification for the Europa League league phase (Note: VfB Stuttgart qualified for the Europa League league phase by winning the 2024–25 DFB-Pokal.)
10	Borussia Mönchengladbach	34	13	6	15	55	57	−2	45	
11	VfL Wolfsburg	34	11	10	13	56	54	+2	43	

Source: Bundesliga
Rules for classification: 1) Points; 2) Goal difference; 3) Goals scored; 4) Head-to-head results; 5) Head-to-head away goals scored; 6) Away goals scored; 7) Play-off.
(Rules 4–6 only apply after home and away matches have been played between the tied teams.)

==== Results summary ====
Overall								Home						Away					
Pld	W	D	L	GF	GA	GD	Pts	W	D	L	GF	GA	GD	W	D	L	GF	GA	GD
34	14	8	12	64	53	+11	50	7	2	8	35	27	+8	7	6	4	29	26	+3

Source: DFB

==== Results by round ====
Round	1	2	3	4	5	6	7	8	9	10	11	12	13	14	15	16	17	18	19	20	21	22	23	24	25	26	27	28	29	30	31	32	33	34
Ground	A	H	A	H	A	H	A	H	A	H	H	A	H	A	H	A	H	H	A	H	A	H	A	H	A	H	A	A	H	A	H	A	H	A
Result	L	D	W	W	D	D	L	W	D	L	W	D	W	W	L	W	W	W	L	L	W	L	D	L	W	L	L	W	L	D	L	W	W	W
Position	16	14	10	7	8	8	10	9	8	11	9	9	8	6	10	7	5	4	4	5	5	6	7	9	8	10	11	9	11	11	11	10	9	9
Points	0	1	4	7	8	9	9	12	13	13	16	17	20	23	23	26	29	32	32	32	35	35	36	36	37	37	37	40	40	41	41	44	47	50

Source: DFB
A = Away; H = Home; W = Win; D = Draw; L = Loss

==== Matches ====
The league schedule was released on 4 July 2024.

24 August 2024 1	SC Freiburg	3–1	VfB Stuttgart	Freiburg
15:30 CEST (UTC+2)	Kübler 27', 61'; Adamu (yellow card) 41'; Dōan 54'; Lienhart (yellow card) 57'	Report	Demirović 2'; Mittelstädt (yellow card) 65'	Stadium: Europa-Park Stadion; Attendance: 34,700; Referee: Tobias Welz

31 August 2024 2	VfB Stuttgart	3–3	Mainz 05	Stuttgart
15:30 CEST (UTC+2)	Millot 8', (yellow card) 57'; Leweling 15'; Karazor (yellow card) 36'; Chabot (yellow card) 53'; Vagnoman (yellow card) 84'; Rieder 88'	Report	Amiri 43' (pen.); Burkardt 62'; Rieß (yellow card) 71'; Widmer (yellow card) 79'; Leitsch 90+4'	Stadium: MHPArena; Attendance: 59,000; Referee: Timo Gerach

14 September 2024 3	Borussia Mönchengladbach	1–3	VfB Stuttgart	Mönchengladbach
15:30 CEST (UTC+2)	Pléa 27'; Weigl (yellow card) 37'; Itakura (yellow card) 90+2'	Report	Vagnoman (yellow card) 14'; Undav 21'; Demirović 58', 61'; Zagadou (yellow card) 89'	Stadium: Borussia-Park; Attendance: 53,756; Referee: Felix Brych

22 September 2024 4	VfB Stuttgart	5–1	Borussia Dortmund	Stuttgart
17:30 CEST (UTC+2)	Undav 4', 90'; Leweling (yellow card) 17'; Demirović 21'; Millot 62'; Touré 80'	Report	Can (yellow card) 73'; Guirassy 75'; Sabitzer (yellow card) 77'; Bensebaini (yellow card) 81'	Stadium: MHPArena; Attendance: 60,000; Referee: Florian Badstübner

28 September 2024 5	VfL Wolfsburg	2–2	VfB Stuttgart	Wolfsburg
15:30 CET (UTC+1)	Wind 20'; Bornauw (yellow card) 45+1'; Arnold (yellow card) 55'; Amoura 68', (yellow card) 79'; Vranckx (yellow card) 90+2'; Koulierakis (yellow card) 90+4'	Report	Karazor (yellow card) 24' (yellow-red card) 63'; Millot (penalty missed) 32', 32'; Undav 90+7'	Stadium: Volkswagen Arena; Attendance: 27,135; Referee: Sven Jablonski

6 October 2024 6	VfB Stuttgart	1–1	TSG Hoffenheim	Stuttgart
19:30 CEST (UTC+2)	Mittelstädt (yellow card) 26'; Demirović (penalty missed) 90+9', 90+9'	Report	Gendrey 45'; Bischof (yellow card) 45+3'; Grillitsch (yellow card) 55'; Kramarić (yellow card) 66'; Chaves (yellow card) 71'	Stadium: MHPArena; Attendance: 58,000; Referee: Harm Osmers

19 October 2024 7	Bayern Munich	4–0	VfB Stuttgart	Munich
18:30 CEST (UTC+2)	Kane 57', 60', 80'; Coman 89'	Report	Undav (yellow card) 53'; Leweling (yellow card) 69'	Stadium: Allianz Arena; Attendance: 75,000; Referee: Tobias Stieler

26 October 2024 8	VfB Stuttgart	2–1	Holstein Kiel	Stuttgart
15:30 CEST (UTC+2)	Undav 19'; Vagnoman (yellow card) 49'; Touré 61'; Chabot (yellow card) 63' (yellow-red card) 66'	Report	Schulz (yellow card) 31'; Remberg (yellow card) 66'; Gigović (yellow card) 71', (goal) 84'; Geschwill (yellow card) 80'; Arp (yellow card) 81' (yellow-red card) 88'	Stadium: MHPArena; Attendance: 59,000; Referee: Robert Hartmann

1 November 2024 9	Bayer Leverkusen	0–0	VfB Stuttgart	Leverkusen
20:30 CET (UTC+1)	Andrich (yellow card) 30'; Mukiele (yellow card) 42'; Xhaka (yellow card) 51'	Report	Karazor (yellow card) 52'; Millot (yellow card) 56'; Chase (yellow card) 68'; Stiller (yellow card) 69'	Stadium: BayArena; Attendance: 30,210; Referee: Daniel Siebert

10 November 2024 10	VfB Stuttgart	2–3	Eintracht Frankfurt	Stuttgart
17:30 CET (UTC+1)	Demirović (penalty missed) 22'; Chabot (yellow card) 57'; Vagnoman 86'; Millot (yellow card) 87'; Woltemade 90'	Report	Tuta (yellow card) 26'; Ekitike 45'; Brown 55'; Marmoush 62'; Chaïbi (yellow card) 90+2'	Stadium: MHPArena; Attendance: 60,000; Referee: Felix Zwayer

23 November 2024 11	VfB Stuttgart	2–0	VfL Bochum	Stuttgart
15:30 CET (UTC+1)	Chabot (yellow card) 6'; Führich 53'; Millot (yellow card) 71'; Diehl 78'	Report	Sissoko (yellow card) 28'; Hofmann (yellow card) 72'; Bero (yellow card) 90'	Stadium: MHPArena; Attendance: 59,000; Referee: Benjamin Brand

30 November 2024 12	Werder Bremen	2–2	VfB Stuttgart	Bremen
15:30 CET (UTC+1)	Njinmah 6'; Stage 77'; Ducksch (yellow card) 87'	Report	Demirović 20', 85'; Stiller (yellow card) 54'	Stadium: Weserstadion; Attendance: 42,100; Referee: Harm Osmers

7 December 2024 13	VfB Stuttgart	3–2	Union Berlin	Stuttgart
20:30 CET (UTC+1)	Mittelstädt (yellow card) 34'; Woltemade 51', 59'; Karazor 69'	Report	Doekhi 37', (yellow card) 90+5'; Rönnow (yellow card) 45+3'; Skov 48'; Skarke (yellow card) 60'; Leite (yellow card) 90+5'; Vertessen (yellow card) 90+5'; Khedira (yellow card) 90+5'	Stadium: MHPArena; Attendance: 59,000; Referee: Tobias Welz

15 December 2024 14	1. FC Heidenheim	1–3	VfB Stuttgart	Heidenheim
15:30 CET (UTC+1)	Gimber (yellow card) 26'; Wanner 41'; Dorsch (yellow card) 75'; Kaufmann (yellow card) 84'; Schöppner (yellow card) 88'	Report	Demirović (yellow card) 10'; Mittelstadt 20'; Woltemade (yellow card) 26', (goal) 85' (pen.); Millot 45+2'; Rouault (yellow card) 90'	Stadium: Voith-Arena; Attendance: 15,000; Referee: Christian Dingert

21 December 2024 15	VfB Stuttgart	0–1	FC St. Pauli	Stuttgart
15:30 CET (UTC+1)	Keitel (yellow card) 76'; Woltemade (yellow card) 90+4'	Report	Eggestein 21', (yellow card) 45+1', (penalty missed) 53'; Sinani (yellow card) 83'	Stadium: MHPArena; Attendance: 60,000; Referee: Felix Brych

12 January 2025 16	FC Augsburg	0–1	VfB Stuttgart	Augsburg
17:30 CET (UTC+1)	Onyeka (yellow card) 15'; Jakić (yellow card) 45+1'; Matsima (yellow card) 67'; Gouweleeuw (yellow card) 73'; Rexhbeçaj (yellow card) 74'	Report	Undav 65'; Chabot (yellow card) 67'	Stadium: WWK Arena; Attendance: 30,660; Referee: Daniel Schlager

15 January 2025 17	VfB Stuttgart	2–1	RB Leipzig	Stuttgart
20:30 CET (UTC+1)	Undav (yellow card) 5'; Bruun Larsen 50'; Woltemade 60'; Leweling (yellow card) 83'	Report	Šeško 10', (yellow card) 20' (yellow-red card) 85'; Orbán (yellow card) 45+1'; Openda (yellow card) 70' (yellow-red card) 88'; Raum (yellow card) 86'; Bitshiabu (yellow card) 90+4'	Stadium: MHPArena; Attendance: 57,500; Referee: Sascha Stegemann

18 January 2025 18	VfB Stuttgart	4–0	SC Freiburg	Stuttgart
15:30 CET (UTC+1)	Rouault 2'; Vagnoman (yellow card) 11'; Demirović 17'; Woltemade 45+5' (pen.); Millot (yellow card) 45+5'; Karazor (yellow card) 53'; Undav 80', (yellow card) 84'; Bruun Larsen (yellow card) 82'	Report	Osterhage (yellow card) 15'; Lienhart (yellow card) 45+5'; Makengo (yellow card) 82'	Stadium: MHPArena; Attendance: 60,000; Referee: Felix Zwayer

25 January 2025 19	Mainz 05	2–0	VfB Stuttgart	Mainz
15:30 CET (UTC+1)	Sano (yellow card) 16'; Weiper 29', (yellow card) 36'; Zentner (yellow card) 41'; Lee Jae-sung (yellow card) 45+2'; Caci 86'	Report	Karazor (yellow card) 57'; Stiller (yellow card) 68'; Chabot (yellow card) 88'	Stadium: Mewa Arena; Attendance: 33,100; Referee: Tobias Stieler

1 February 2025 20	VfB Stuttgart	1–2	Borussia Mönchengladbach	Stuttgart
15:30 CET (UTC+1)	Elvedi 49' (o.g.); Hendriks (yellow card) 57'; Mittelstädt (yellow card) 62'	Report	Ngoumou 25'; Stöger (yellow card) 42'; Kleindienst (yellow card) 57', (goal) 82'	Stadium: MHPArena; Attendance: 60,000; Referee: Robert Hartmann

8 February 2025 21	Borussia Dortmund	1–2	VfB Stuttgart	Dortmund
15:30 CET (UTC+1)	Can (yellow card) 17'; Ryerson (yellow card) 56' (yellow-red card) 89'; Adeyemi (yellow card) 60'; Brandt 81'; Duranville (yellow card) 90+2'	Report	Anton 50' (o.g.); Chabot 61'; Stiller (yellow card) 89'; Karazor (yellow card) 90+6'	Stadium: Signal Iduna Park; Attendance: 81,365; Referee: Jan Seidel

15 February 2025 22	VfB Stuttgart	1–2	VfL Wolfsburg	Stuttgart
15:30 CET (UTC+1)	Chabot (yellow card) 45+1'; Karazor (yellow card) 45+4'; Woltemade 72'; Hendriks (yellow card) 90+3'	Report	Fischer (yellow card) 8'; Gerhardt (yellow card) 45+5'; Svanberg (yellow card) 76'; Tomás 77'; Amoura 87' (pen.); Behrens (yellow card) 90+3'	Stadium: MHPArena; Attendance: 58,000; Referee: Tobias Welz

23 February 2025 23	TSG Hoffenheim	1–1	VfB Stuttgart	Sinsheim
19:30 CET (UTC+1)	Orban 74'	Report	Woltemade 9'	Stadium: Rhein-Neckar-Arena; Attendance: 30,150; Referee: Christian Dingert

28 February 2025 24	VfB Stuttgart	1–3	Bayern Munich	Stuttgart
20:30 CET (UTC+1)	Stiller 34'; Jeltsch (yellow card) 39'; Chabot (yellow card) 42'; Führich (yellow card) 48'; Millot (yellow card) 90+3'; Demirović (yellow card) 90+7'	Report	Olise 45'; Laimer (yellow card) 59'; Goretzka 64', (yellow card) 66'; Coman 90'; Kane (yellow card) 90+3'	Stadium: MHPArena; Attendance: 60,000; Referee: Benjamin Brand

8 March 2025 25	Holstein Kiel	2–2	VfB Stuttgart	Kiel
15:30 CET (UTC+1)	Skrzybski 30', 46'; Remberg (yellow card) 83'	Report	Millot (yellow card) 8'; Leweling 15', (yellow card) 90+1'; Stergiou (red card) 53'; Demirović 55'	Stadium: Holstein-Stadion; Attendance: 15,034; Referee: Bastian Dankert

16 March 2025 26	VfB Stuttgart	3–4	Bayer Leverkusen	Stuttgart
19:30 CET (UTC+1)	Demirović 15'; Karazor (yellow card) 27'; Woltemade 48', (yellow card) 64'; Jeltsch (yellow card) 51'; Xhaka 62' (o.g.)	Report	Frimpong 56'; Hincapié 68', (yellow card) 77'; Andrich (yellow card) 74'; Stiller 88' (o.g.); Schick 90+4'	Stadium: MHPArena; Attendance: 59,000; Referee: Daniel Siebert

29 March 2025 27	Eintracht Frankfurt	1–0	VfB Stuttgart	Frankfurt
18:30 CET (UTC+1)	Tuta (yellow card) 19'; Götze 71'	Report	Millot (yellow card) 34'; Mittelstädt (yellow card) 49'; Al-Dakhil (red card) 58'; Stiller (yellow card) 90'	Stadium: Deutsche Bank Park; Attendance: 58,000; Referee: Deniz Aytekin

5 April 2025 28	VfL Bochum	0–4	VfB Stuttgart	Bochum
15:30 CEST (UTC+2)	Sissoko (yellow card) 79'	Report	Chabot 8'; Demirović 11', 48', 85'; Rieder (yellow card) 80'	Stadium: Vonovia Ruhrstadion; Attendance: 26,000; Referee: Felix Brych

13 April 2025 29	VfB Stuttgart	1–2	Werder Bremen	Stuttgart
15:30 CEST (UTC+2)	Stergiou 19'; Karazor (yellow card) 40'; Woltemade (yellow card) 49' (yellow-red card) 65'	Report	Weiser (yellow card) 6'; Burke 32', 90'; Stage (yellow card) 44'	Stadium: MHPArena; Attendance: 60,000; Referee: Daniel Schlager

19 April 2025 30	Union Berlin	4–4	VfB Stuttgart	Berlin
18:30 CEST (UTC+2)	Ilić 5', 45+6'; Leite 19'; Querfeld 38'	Report	Chabot (yellow card) 18'; Undav 23'; Millot 29'; Chabot 43'; Führich 45+1'; Hendriks (yellow card) 89'	Stadium: Stadion An der Alten Försterei; Attendance: 22,012; Referee: Tobias Stieler

25 April 2025 31	VfB Stuttgart	0–1	1. FC Heidenheim	Stuttgart
20:30 CEST (UTC+2)		Report	Krätzig (yellow card) 21'; Busch (yellow card) 45+2'; Dorsch (yellow card) 62'; Conteh (yellow card) 77'; Honsak 89'	Stadium: MHPArena; Attendance: 60,000; Referee: Tobias Welz

3 May 2025 32	FC St. Pauli	0–1	VfB Stuttgart	Hamburg
15:30 CEST (UTC+2)	Van der Heyden (yellow card) 38' (yellow-red card) 57'; Boukhalfa (yellow card) 51'; Sinani (yellow card) 84'; Vasilj (yellow card) 90+6' (yellow-red card) 90+6'	Report	Chabot (yellow card) 17'; Stiller (yellow card) 53'; Woltemade (penalty missed) 60', 88'; Undav (yellow card) 67'	Stadium: Millerntor-Stadion; Attendance: 29,546; Referee: Florian Exner

11 May 2025 33	VfB Stuttgart	4–0	FC Augsburg	Stuttgart
19:30 CEST (UTC+2)	Karazor 8'; Millot (yellow card) 45+2', (goal) 80'; Woltemade 51'; Demirović 87'	Report	Essende (red card) 12'; Giannoulis (yellow card) 86'	Stadium: MHPArena; Attendance: 49,000; Referee: Timo Gerach

17 May 2025 34	RB Leipzig	2–3	VfB Stuttgart	Leipzig
15:30 CEST (UTC+2)	Simons 8'; Gomis (yellow card) 33'; Baku 44'	Report	Undav 23'; Woltemade 57'; Demirović 78'	Stadium: Red Bull Arena; Attendance: 47,800; Referee: Daniel Siebert

=== DFB-Pokal ===
27 August 2024 First round	Preußen Münster	0–5	VfB Stuttgart	Münster
20:45 CEST (UTC+2)	Hendrix (yellow card) 21'; Kirkeskov (yellow card) 90'	Report	Stiller 7'; Demirović 15'; Stenzel 35'; Woltemade 72'; Karazor 80' (pen.); Hendriks (yellow card) 85'	Stadium: Preußenstadion; Attendance: 12,672; Referee: Matthias Jöllenbeck

29 October 2024 Second round	VfB Stuttgart	2–1	1. FC Kaiserslautern	Stuttgart
20:45 CET (UTC+1)	Woltemade 14'; Führich (yellow card) 35', (goal) 76'; Millot (yellow card) 90+4'	Report	Tomiak 43' (pen.); Ritter (yellow card) 62'; Raschl (yellow card) 80'; Wekesser (yellow card) 86'; Hanslik (yellow card) 90+3'	Stadium: MHPArena; Attendance: 60,000; Referee: Daniel Schlager

3 December 2024 Round of 16	Jahn Regensburg	0–3	VfB Stuttgart	Regensburg
18:00 CET (UTC+1)	Hottmann (yellow card) 38'; Breunig (yellow card) 77'	Report	Millot 10'; Chase 19'; Woltemade 61'	Stadium: Jahnstadion Regensburg; Attendance: 15,210; Referee: Florian Badstübner

4 February 2025 Quarter-finals	VfB Stuttgart	1–0	FC Augsburg	Stuttgart
20:45 CET (UTC+1)	Undav 30'; Demirović (yellow card) 68'; Keitel (yellow card) 73'	Report	Giannoulis (yellow card) 90+4'	Stadium: MHPArena; Attendance: 59,000; Referee: Sascha Stegemann

2 April 2025 Semi-finals	VfB Stuttgart	3–1	RB Leipzig	Stuttgart
20:45 CEST (UTC+2)	Stiller 5'; Woltemade 57'; Leweling 73'	Report	Seiwald (yellow card) 36'; Šeško 62'; Simons (yellow card) 73'	Stadium: MHPArena; Attendance: 60,000; Referee: Sven Jablonski

24 May 2025 Final	Arminia Bielefeld	2–4	VfB Stuttgart	Berlin
20:00 CEST (UTC+2)	Sarenren Bazee (yellow card) 25'; Schneider (yellow card) 53'; Kania 82'; Vagnoman 85' (o.g.); Felix (yellow card) 90'	Report	Woltemade 15'; Millot 22', 66', (yellow card) 67'; Vagnoman (yellow card) 27'; Undav 28'	Stadium: Olympiastadion; Attendance: 74,036; Referee: Christian Dingert

=== DFL-Supercup ===
17 August 2024 Final	Bayer Leverkusen	2–2 (4–3 p)	VfB Stuttgart	Leverkusen
20:30 CEST (UTC+2)	Boniface 11', (yellow card) 80'; Terrier (red card) 37'; Xhaka (yellow card) 61'; Tapsoba (yellow card) 71'; Wirtz (yellow card) 85'; Frimpong (yellow card) 86'; Schick 88'	Report	Millot 15', (yellow card) 78'; Stiller (yellow card) 44'; Undav 63'; Demirović (yellow card) 71'; Stenzel (yellow card) 82'; Chabot (yellow card) 86'	Stadium: BayArena; Attendance: 30,210; Referee: Tobias Stieler
	Penalties
	Schick (penalty scored); Grimaldo (penalty scored); García (penalty scored); Tapsoba (penalty scored)		(penalty scored) Millot; (penalty scored) Demirović; (penalty missed) Krätzig; (penalty scored) Undav; (penalty missed) Silas

=== UEFA Champions League ===
==== League phase ====
The draw for the league phase was held on 29 August 2024.

Pos	Team	Pld	W	D	L	GF	GA	GD	Pts	Qualification
24	(Royal Belgian Football Association) Club Brugge	8	3	2	3	7	11	−4	11	Advance to knockout phase play-offs (unseeded)
25	(Croatian Football Federation) Dinamo Zagreb	8	3	2	3	12	19	−7	11	
26	(German Football Association) VfB Stuttgart	8	3	1	4	13	17	−4	10	
27	(Ukrainian Association of Football) Shakhtar Donetsk	8	2	1	5	8	16	−8	7	
28	(Italian Football Federation) Bologna	8	1	3	4	4	9	−5	6	

Source: UEFA
Rules for classification: League phase tiebreakers

Round	1	2	3	4	5	6	7	8
Ground	A	H	A	H	A	H	A	H
Result	L	D	W	L	L	W	W	L
Position	27	24	18	27	27	26	24	26
Points	0	1	4	4	4	7	10	10

Source: UEFA
A = Away; H = Home; W = Win; D = Draw; L = Loss

17 September 2024 1	Real Madrid (Spain)	3–1	(Germany) VfB Stuttgart	Madrid, Spain
21:00 CEST (UTC+2)	Vázquez (yellow card) 23'; Mbappé 46'; Valverde (yellow card) 78'; Militão (yellow card) 80'; Rüdiger 83'; Modrić (yellow card) 90+5'; Endrick 90+5'	Report	Mittelstädt (yellow card) 30'; Undav 68'	Stadium: Santiago Bernabéu; Attendance: 71,288; Referee: Halil Umut Meler (Turkey)

1 October 2024 2	VfB Stuttgart (Germany)	1–1	(Czech Republic) Sparta Prague	Stuttgart
18:45 CEST (UTC+2)	Millot 7'; Stenzel (yellow card) 12'	Report	Kairinen 32', (yellow card) 77'	Stadium: MHPArena; Attendance: 60,000; Referee: Manfredas Lukjančukas (Lithuania)

22 October 2024 3	Juventus (Italy)	0–1	(Germany) VfB Stuttgart	Turin, Italy
21:00 CEST (UTC+2)	Danilo (yellow card) 81' (yellow-red card) 84'	Report	Demirović (yellow card) 51'; Rouault (yellow card) 54'; Millot (penalty missed) 86'; Touré 90+2'	Stadium: Juventus Stadium; Attendance: 41,306; Referee: Espen Eskås (Norway)

6 November 2024 4	VfB Stuttgart (Germany)	0–2	(Italy) Atalanta	Stuttgart
21:00 CET (UTC+1)	Chase (yellow card) 41'; Demirović (yellow card) 69'	Report	Hien (yellow card) 44'; Lookman 51'; Éderson (yellow card) 55'; Bellanova (yellow card) 79'; Zaniolo 88'	Stadium: MHPArena; Attendance: 60,000; Referee: Rade Obrenović (Slovenia)

27 November 2024 5	Red Star Belgrade (Serbia)	5–1	(Germany) VfB Stuttgart	Belgrade, Serbia
18:45 CET (UTC+1)	Silas 12'; Krunić 31', (yellow card) 52'; Maksimović (yellow card) 45'; Ndiaye (yellow card) 45+2'; Rodić (yellow card) 45+2'; Ivanić 65'; Radonjić 69', 88'	Report	Demirović 5'; Rouault (yellow card) 45+2'	Stadium: Red Star Stadium; Attendance: 41,372; Referee: Erik Lambrechts (Belgium)

11 December 2024 6	VfB Stuttgart (Germany)	5–1	(Switzerland) Young Boys	Stuttgart
21:00 CET (UTC+1)	Stiller 25'; Millot 53'; Führich 61'; Vagnoman 66'; Keitel 75'; Rieder (yellow card) 86'	Report	Łakomy 6', (yellow card) 90'; Benito (yellow card) 58'; Hadjam (yellow card) 60'; Ugrinić (yellow card) 88'	Stadium: MHPArena; Attendance: 60,000; Referee: Giorgi Kruashvili (Georgia)

21 January 2025 7	Slovan Bratislava (Slovakia)	1–3	(Germany) VfB Stuttgart	Bratislava, Slovakia
21:00 CET (UTC+1)	Kashia (yellow card) 30'; Savvidis (yellow card) 45+2'; Metsoko 85'; Barseghyan (yellow card) 90'	Report	Leweling 11', 36'; Rouault (yellow card) 25'; Undav (yellow card) 54'; Keitel (yellow card) 61'; Rieder 87'	Stadium: Tehelné pole Attendance: 22,500; Referee: Chris Kavanagh (England)

29 January 2025 8	VfB Stuttgart (Germany)	1–4	(France) Paris Saint-Germain	Stuttgart
21:00 CET (UTC+1)	Stiller (yellow card) 53'; Karazor (yellow card) 70'; Pacho 77' (o.g.)	Report	Barcola 6'; Dembélé 17', 35', 54'; Neves (yellow card) 66'	Stadium: MHPArena; Attendance: 60,000; Referee: Davide Massa (Italy)

== Statistics ==
=== Appearances and goals ===
No.	Pos	Nat	Player	Total		Bundesliga		DFB-Pokal		DFL-Supercup		Champions League	
No.	Pos	Nat	Player	Apps	Goals	Apps	Goals	Apps	Goals	Apps	Goals	Apps	Goals
Goalkeepers
1	GK	(Germany) GER	Fabian Bredlow	6	0	4	0	0	0	1	0	1	0
21	GK	(Germany) GER	Stefan Drljača	0	0	0	0	0	0	0	0	0	0
33	GK	(Germany) GER	Alexander Nübel	43	0	30	0	6	0	0	0	7	0
41	GK	(Germany) GER	Dennis Seimen	0	0	0	0	0	0	0	0	0	0
Defenders
2	DF	(Belgium) BEL	Ameen Al Dakhil	17	0	12	0	2	0	0	0	3	0
3	DF	(Netherlands) NED	Ramon Hendriks	10	0	8	0	1	0	0	0	1	0
4	DF	(Germany) GER	Josha Vagnoman	37	4	26	2	3	1	1	0	7	1
7	DF	(Germany) GER	Maximilian Mittelstädt	44	1	31	1	4	0	1	0	8	0
15	DF	(Germany) GER	Pascal Stenzel	21	0	14	0	2	0	0	0	5	0
20	DF	(Switzerland) SUI	Leonidas Stergiou	16	1	12	1	1	0	0	0	3	0
23	DF	(France) FRA	Dan-Axel Zagadou	4	0	4	0	0	0	0	0	0	0
24	DF	(Germany) GER	Jeff Chabot	44	3	30	3	5	0	1	0	8	0
45	DF	(Japan) JPN	Anrie Chase	26	0	18	0	2	0	0+1	0	5	0
Midfielders
5	MF	(Germany) GER	Yannik Keitel	16	2	10	1	2	0	0	0	4	1
6	MF	(Germany) GER	Angelo Stiller	47	2	32	1	6	0	1	0	8	1
8	MF	(France) FRA	Enzo Millot	43	10	29	6	5	2	0+1	0	8	2
16	MF	(Germany) GER	Atakan Karazor	42	2	30	2	4	0	1	0	7	0
27	MF	(Germany) GER	Chris Führich	42	5	30	4	4	0	1	0	7	1
28	MF	(Denmark) DEN	Nikolas Nartey	2	0	2	0	0	0	0	0	0	0
32	MF	(Switzerland) SUI	Fabian Rieder	40	2	28	1	3	0	1	0	8	1
Forwards
9	FW	(Bosnia and Herzegovina) BIH	Ermedin Demirović	47	17	33	15	5	1	0+1	0	8	1
10	FW	(Mali) MLI	El Bilal Touré	32	4	24	3	2	0	0	0	6	1
11	FW	(Germany) GER	Nick Woltemade	29	15	20	10	5	5	1	0	3	0
17	FW	(Germany) GER	Justin Diehl	11	1	10	1	1	0	0	0	0	0
18	FW	(Germany) GER	Jamie Leweling	37	5	27	2	4	0	1	1	5	2
19	FW	(Denmark) DEN	Wahid Faghir	0	0	0	0	0	0	0	0	0	0
22	FW	(Germany) GER	Thomas Kastanaras	0	0	0	0	0	0	0	0	0	0
26	FW	(Germany) GER	Deniz Undav	38	14	27	9	4	3	1	1	6	1
40	FW	(Germany) GER	Luca Raimund	1	0	1	0	0	0	0	0	0	0
Players transferred out during the season
13	DF	(Germany) GER	Frans Krätzig	7	0	5	0	2	0	0	0	0	0
14	FW	(Democratic Republic of the Congo) COD	Silas	2	0	1	0	1	0	0	0	0	0
29	DF	(France) FRA	Anthony Rouault	22	1	15	1	2	0	0	0	5	0

Last updated: 31 January 2026
Source: Competitions
