= Dennis Seimen =

German footballer (born 2005)

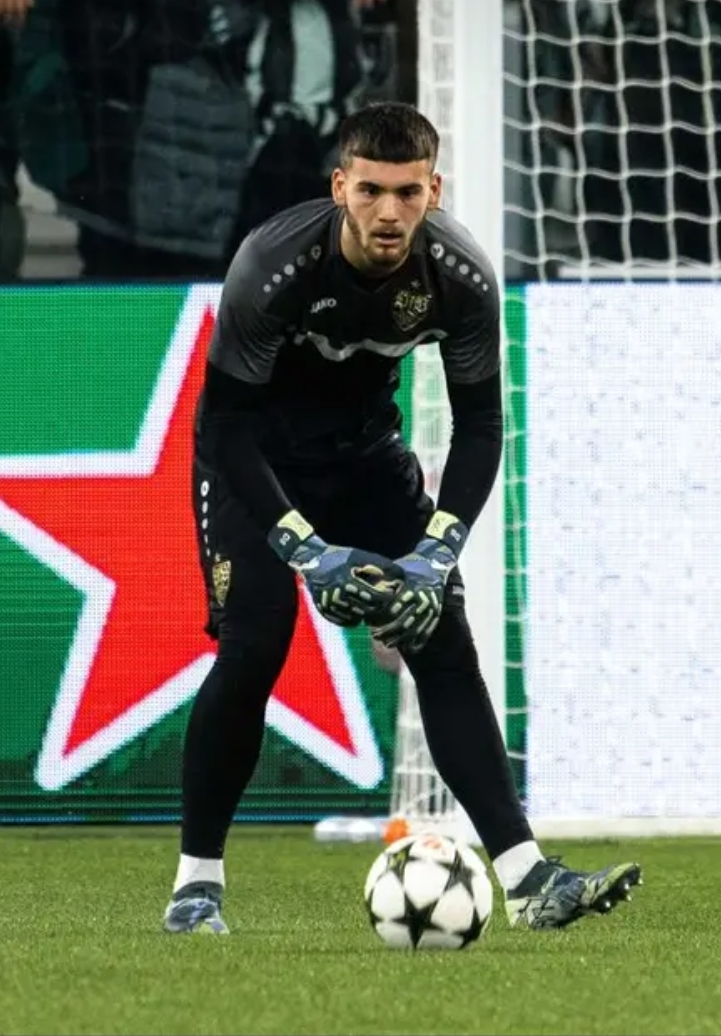
- Seimen training with Stuttgart in 2024

Personal information
- Date of birth: 1 December 2005 (age 20)
- Place of birth: Heilbronn, Germany
- Height: 1.92 m (6 ft 4 in)
- Position: Goalkeeper

Team information
- Current team: VfB Stuttgart
- Number: 41

Youth career
- 2009–2013: FC Heilbronn
- 2013–2015: Karlsruher SC
- 2015–2023: VfB Stuttgart

Senior career*
Years	Team	Apps	(Gls)
2023–2025	VfB Stuttgart II	57	(0)
2023–	VfB Stuttgart	4	(0)
2025–2026	→ Paderborn 07 (loan)	34	(0)

International career^{‡}
2020	Germany U16	1	(0)
2021–2022	Germany U17	8	(0)
2022–2023	Germany U18	3	(0)
2023–2024	Germany U19	3	(0)
2024–2025	Germany U20	2	(0)
2025–	Germany U21	6	(0)
- * Club domestic league appearances and goals as of 31 October 2026 ‡ National team caps and goals as of 20:35, 17 November 2026 (UTC)

Dennis Seimen (German pronunciation: [ˈdɛnɪs ˈzaɪ̯mən]; born 1 December 2005) is a German professional footballer who plays as a goalkeeper for Bundesliga club VfB Stuttgart and the Germany under-21 team.

== Club career ==
Seimen was a youth product of FC Heilbronn and Karlsruher SC, before moving to VfB Stuttgart's academy in 2015. Captaining their U17s, he signed his first professional contract with Stuttgart at the age of 15 on 13 October 2021. He was promoted to VfB Stuttgart II in the Regionalliga in April 2023. He was called up to Stuttgart's senior team for the first time as the backup goalkeeper in a Bundesliga tie with Bayer Leverkusen on 14 May 2023. Seimen was named as the second keeper for the Stuttgart team in advance of the 2023–24 Bundesliga season.

On 13 September 2024, Seimen extended his contract with VfB Stuttgart until June 2029.

On 30 May 2025, Seimen moved on loan to SC Paderborn in 2. Bundesliga. He broke SC Paderborn's record for most clean-sheets in a season, and even kept clean-sheets in all of his first four games.

== International career ==
While being eligible to also play for Romania, he is a youth international for Germany. He was named captain of the Germany U17s in 2022, and was part of the squad at the 2022 UEFA European Under-17 Championship. For the U21s, he made his debut in 2025 as first choice goalkeeper.

== Personal life ==
Born in Heilbronn, Germany, he is the son of Reinhold Seimen and Ana Nita. His father is Transylvanian Saxon, an ethnic German diasporic minority living in Romania, of whom most are Spätaussiedler by now. A football coach, his father was born in Zendersch, a village in Bladenmarkt, Transylvania (Siebenbürgen). His mother is Romanian and used to play football too.

== Career statistics ==
As of match played 31 October 2026

Appearances and goals by club, season and competition
Club	Season	League			DFB-Pokal		Europe		Other		Total	
Club	Season	Division	Apps	Goals	Apps	Goals	Apps	Goals	Apps	Goals	Apps	Goals
VfB Stuttgart II	2022–23	Regionalliga Südwest	4	0	—		—		—		4	0
VfB Stuttgart II	2023–24	Regionalliga Südwest	19	0	—		—		—		19	0
VfB Stuttgart II	2024–25	3. Liga	34	0	—		—		—		34	0
VfB Stuttgart II	Total		57	0	—		—		—		57	0
VfB Stuttgart	2022–23	Bundesliga	0	0	0	0	—		—		0	0
VfB Stuttgart	2023–24	Bundesliga	0	0	0	0	—		—		0	0
VfB Stuttgart	2024–25	Bundesliga	0	0	0	0	0	0	0	0	0	0
VfB Stuttgart	2026–27	Bundesliga	4	0	0	0	1 (Note: Appearances in UEFA Champions League)	0	—		5	0
VfB Stuttgart	Total		4	0	0	0	1	0	0	0	5	0
Paderborn 07 (loan)	2025–26	2. Bundesliga	34	0	0	0	—		2	0	36	0
Career total			95	0	0	0	1	0	2	0	98	0
