= Stefan Drljača =

German footballer (born 1999)

Personal information
- Date of birth: 20 April 1999 (age 27)
- Place of birth: Homburg, Germany
- Height: 1.92 m (6 ft 4 in)
- Position: Goalkeeper

Team information
- Current team: VfB Stuttgart
- Number: 46

Youth career
- FC 08 Homburg
- 2013–2016: SV Elversberg
- 2016–2018: TSG Hoffenheim

Senior career*
Years	Team	Apps	(Gls)
2018–2020	TSG Hoffenheim II	35	(0)
2020–2022	Borussia Dortmund II	29	(0)
2022–2024	Dynamo Dresden	54	(0)
2024–	VfB Stuttgart II	9	(0)
- * Club domestic league appearances and goals as of 30 May 2026

Stefan Drljača (Serbian Cyrillic: Стефан Дрљача; born 20 April 1999) is a German professional footballer who plays as a goalkeeper for Bundesliga club VfB Stuttgart.

== Career ==
Drljača is a youth academy graduate of TSG Hoffenheim II. In August 2020, he joined Borussia Dortmund II on a two-year deal. He made his professional debut for the team on 5 September 2021 in a 1–0 league win against TSV Havelse. He moved to Dynamo Dresden in June 2022.

On 24 May 2024, VfB Stuttgart announced the signing of Drljača on a three-year contract until June 2027.

== Personal life ==
Born in Germany, Drljača is of paternal Bosnian Serb and maternal Croat descent. His father, Nenad Drljača, hails from Bosanski Novi and is a former footballer who played for Serbian club Vojvodina during the Yugoslav First League era. His mother hails from Slavonski Brod.

== Career statistics ==
As of match played 20 December 2023

Appearances and goals by club, season and competition
Club	Season	League			Cup		Europe		Other		Total	
Club	Season	Division	Apps	Goals	Apps	Goals	Apps	Goals	Apps	Goals	Apps	Goals
TSG Hoffenheim II	2017–18	Regionalliga Südwest	1	0	—		—		—		1	0
TSG Hoffenheim II	2018–19	Regionalliga Südwest	16	0	—		—		—		16	0
TSG Hoffenheim II	2019–20	Regionalliga Südwest	18	0	—		—		—		18	0
TSG Hoffenheim II	Total		35	0	—		—		—		35	0
Borussia Dortmund II	2020–21	Regionalliga West	14	0	—		—		—		14	0
Borussia Dortmund II	2021–22	3. Liga	15	0	—		—		—		15	0
Borussia Dortmund II	Total		29	0	—		—		—		29	0
Borussia Dortmund	2020–21	Bundesliga	0	0	0	0	0	0	0	0	0	0
Borussia Dortmund	2021–22	Bundesliga	0	0	0	0	0	0	0	0	0	0
Borussia Dortmund	Total		0	0	0	0	0	0	0	0	0	0
Dynamo Dresden	2022–23	3. Liga	34	0	0	0	—		—		34	0
Dynamo Dresden	2023–24	3. Liga	20	0	0	0	—		—		20	0
Dynamo Dresden	Total		54	0	0	0	—		—		54	0
VfB Stuttgart	2024–25	Bundesliga	0	0	0	0	0	0	—		0	0
Career total			118	0	0	0	0	0	0	0	118	0

== Honours ==
Borussia Dortmund II

- Regionalliga West: 2020–21

Borussia Dortmund

- DFB-Pokal: 2020–21

Dynamo Dresden

- Saxony Cup: 2023–24
