= Anrie Chase =

Japanese footballer

Anrie Chase チェイス・アンリ
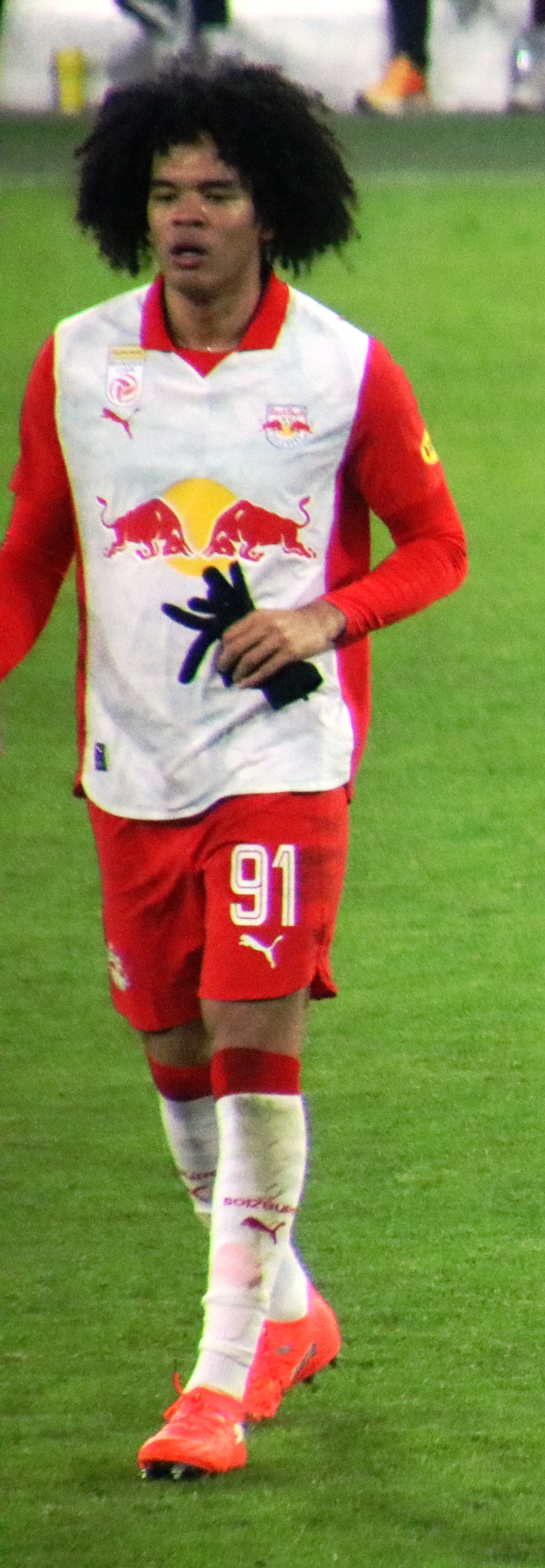
- Chase in 2026

Personal information
- Full name: Anrie Chase
- Date of birth: 24 March 2004 (age 22)
- Place of birth: Yokosuka, Kanagawa, Japan
- Height: 1.87 m (6 ft 2 in)
- Position: Defender

Team information
- Current team: Red Bull Salzburg
- Number: 91

Youth career
- 2016–2018: Nagasawa Junior High School
- 2018: FC Shonan
- 2019–2021: Shoshi High School

Senior career*
Years	Team	Apps	(Gls)
2022–2025	VfB Stuttgart II	46	(2)
2024–2025	VfB Stuttgart	12	(0)
2025–	Red Bull Salzburg	4	(0)
2026–	FC Liefering	2	(0)

International career^{‡}
2023	Japan U20	3	(0)
2021–	Japan U23	6	(0)
- * Club domestic league appearances and goals as of 17 May 2026 ‡ National team caps and goals as of 22:15, 18 October 2023 (UTC)

Anrie Chase (チェイス・アンリ, Cheisu Anri; born 24 March 2004) is a Japanese professional footballer who plays as a defender for Austrian Bundesliga club Red Bull Salzburg.

== Club career ==
Born in Yokosuka, Kanagawa to a Japanese mother and American father of Jamaican descent, Chase moved to Texas at the age of three, spending nine years before returning to Japan. While in the United States, Chase also played basketball, and started his football career as a forward.

Having trained with Dutch side AZ Alkmaar and German side VfB Stuttgart, Chase has aimed to pursue a career overseas. He was also reportedly scouted by Dutch giants Ajax.

On 7 April 2022, Chase signed a contract with VfB Stuttgart II that came into effect on 1 July 2022. In 2024 he was also nominated for the Bundesliga team of VfB Stuttgart.

On 1 August 2025, Chase moved to Austrian Bundesliga club Red Bull Salzburg, and signed a five-year contract.

== International career ==
Although likewise eligible to represent the United States or Jamaica at the senior level, Chase has represented Japan up to under-23 level. He trained with the senior team in 2022. He was praised by coach Hajime Moriyasu for his talent and potential.

Chase was called up to the Japan U-20 squad for the 2023 FIFA U-20 World Cup.

== Career statistics ==
As of match played 17 May 2026

Appearances and goals by club, season and competition
Club	Season	League			National cup (Note: Includes DFB-Pokal)		Europe		Other		Total	
Club	Season	Division	Apps	Goals	Apps	Goals	Apps	Goals	Apps	Goals	Apps	Goals
VfB Stuttgart II	2022–23	Regionalliga Südwest	12	0	—		—		—		12	0
VfB Stuttgart II	2023–24	Regionalliga Südwest	26	2	—		—		—		26	2
VfB Stuttgart II	2024–25	3. Liga	8	0	—		—		—		8	0
VfB Stuttgart II	Total		46	2	—		—		—		46	2
VfB Stuttgart	2024–25	Bundesliga	12	0	3	1	5 (Note: Appearances in UEFA Champions League)	0	0	0	20	1
Red Bull Salzburg	2025–26	Austrian Bundesliga	4	0	0	0	0	0	—		4	0
FC Liefering	2025–26	2. Liga	2	0	—		—		—		2	0
Career total			64	2	3	1	5	0	0	0	72	3
