= Luca Raimund =

German footballer (born 2005)

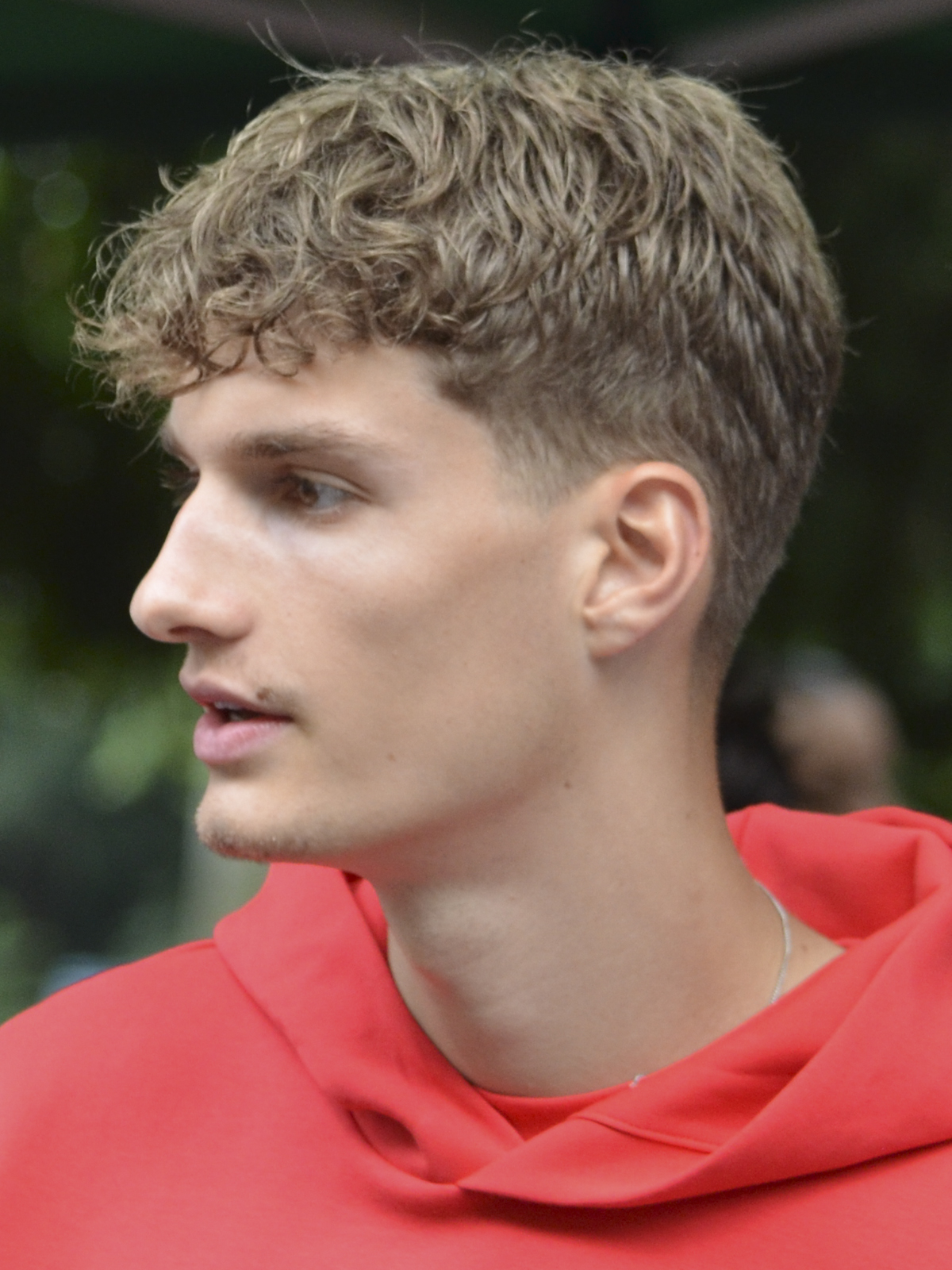
- Luca Raimund

Personal information
- Full name: Luca Joachim Raimund
- Date of birth: 9 April 2005 (age 21)
- Place of birth: Böblingen, Germany
- Height: 1.88 m (6 ft 2 in)
- Position: Winger

Team information
- Current team: VfL Osnabrück
- Number: 17

Youth career
- 2019–2023: VfB Stuttgart

Senior career*
Years	Team	Apps	(Gls)
2023–2025	VfB Stuttgart	3	(0)
2024–2025	VfB Stuttgart II	12	(1)
2025–2026	Fortuna Düsseldorf	15	(1)
2026–	VfL Osnabrück	0	(0)

International career
2021	Germany U17	2	(0)
2022	Germany U18	6	(0)
- * Club domestic league appearances and goals as of 18 May 2026

Luca Joachim Raimund (born 9 April 2005) is a German professional footballer who plays as a winger for 2. Bundesliga club VfL Osnabrück.

== Club career ==
Raimund joined the youth academy of VfB Stuttgart in 2019. On 10 August 2022, he signed his first professional contract with Stuttgart. He made his senior debut with Stuttgart as a substitute in a 2–0 Bundesliga loss to 1. FC Heidenheim on 5 November 2023.

On 26 June 2025, Raimund signed with Fortuna Düsseldorf in 2. Bundesliga.

On 19 June 2026, Raimund moved to VfL Osnabrück.

== International career ==
Raimund is a youth international for Germany, having played up to the Germany U18s.

== Personal life ==
The German ski jumper Philipp Raimund is Luca's cousin.

== Career statistics ==
As of match played 18 May 2024

Appearances and goals by club, season and competition
Club	Season	League			DFB-Pokal		Europe		Other		Total	
Club	Season	Division	Apps	Goals	Apps	Goals	Apps	Goals	Apps	Goals	Apps	Goals
VfB Stuttgart	2023–24	Bundesliga	3	0	0	0	—		—		3	0
VfB Stuttgart II	2023–24	Regionalliga Südwest	7	1	—		—		—		7	1
Career total			10	1	0	0	0	0	0	0	10	1
