= Angelo Stiller =

German footballer (born 2001)

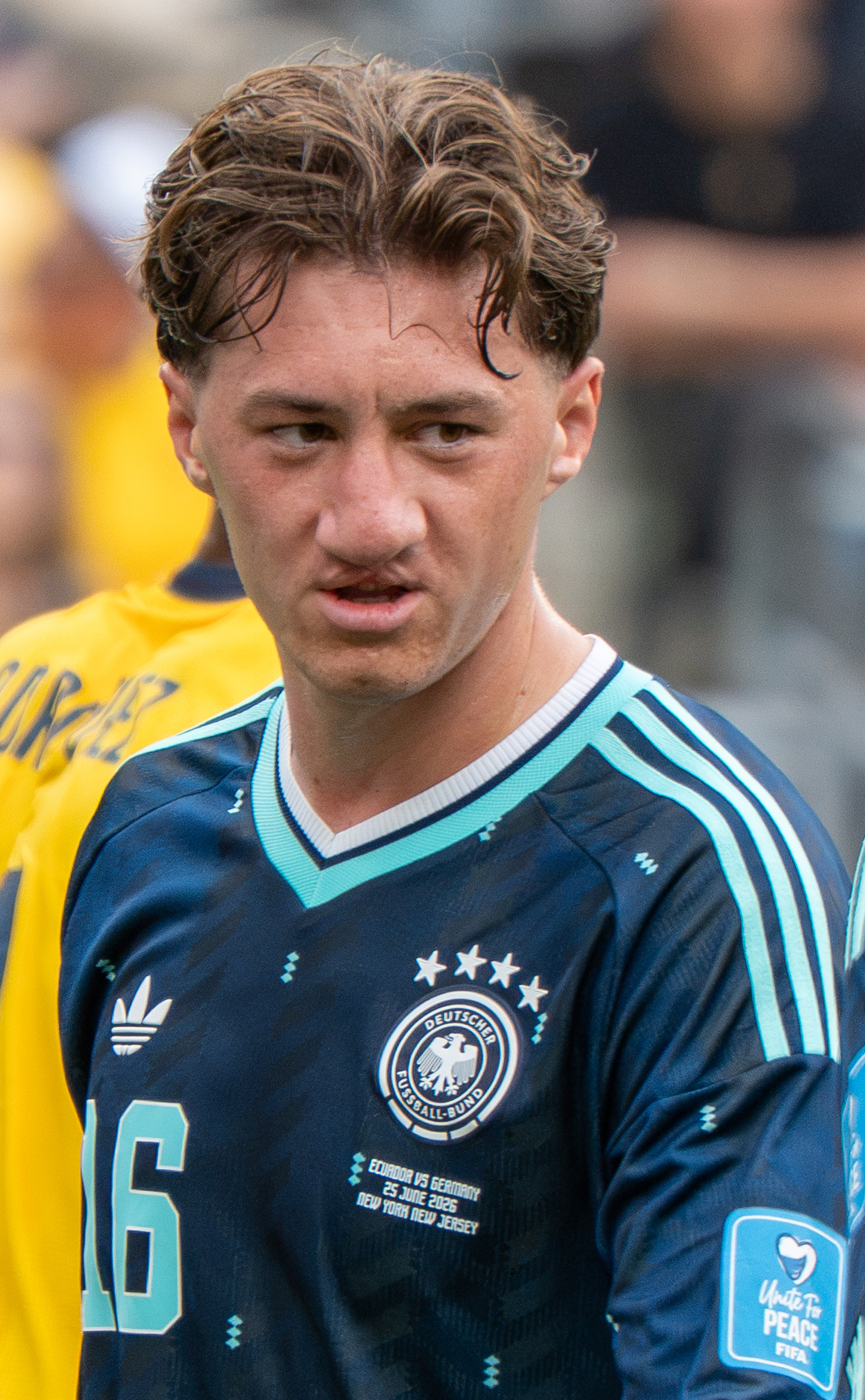
- Stiller with Germany in 2026

Personal information
- Full name: Angelo Nicolas Stiller
- Date of birth: 4 April 2001 (age 25)
- Place of birth: Munich, Germany
- Height: 1.83 m (6 ft 0 in)
- Position: Defensive midfielder

Team information
- Current team: VfB Stuttgart
- Number: 6

Youth career
- –2010: TSV Milbertshofen
- 2010–2019: Bayern Munich

Senior career*
Years	Team	Apps	(Gls)
2019–2021	Bayern Munich II	50	(1)
2020–2021	Bayern Munich	0	(0)
2021–2023	TSG Hoffenheim	47	(3)
2023–	VfB Stuttgart	104	(4)

International career^{‡}
2018	Germany U17	2	(0)
2019	Germany U18	1	(0)
2020	Germany U20	1	(0)
2021–2023	Germany U21	17	(2)
2024–	Germany	9	(0)
- * Club domestic league appearances and goals as of 22:20, 23 October 2026 (UTC) ‡ National team caps and goals as of 22:15, 25 June 2026 (UTC)

Angelo Nicolas Stiller (German pronunciation: [ˈandʒelo ˈʃtɪlɐ]; born 4 April 2001) is a German professional footballer who plays as a defensive midfielder for Bundesliga club VfB Stuttgart and the Germany national team.

== Early life ==
Stiller was born in Munich, Germany. He has a cleft lip, which affects the shape of his nose.

== Club career ==
=== Bayern Munich ===
Stiller made his professional debut for Bayern's reserve team making 17 appearances during the 2019–20 season. In October 2020, he made his debut for Bayern Munich in a 3–0 victory against 1. FC Düren in the 2020–21 DFB-Pokal, replacing Niklas Süle in the second half. On 1 December 2020, Stiller made his Champions League debut in a 1–1 away draw against Atlético Madrid.

=== TSG Hoffenheim ===
On 18 January 2021, Stiller joined TSG Hoffenheim for the 2021–22 season. Later that year, on 15 December, he scored his first Bundesliga goal in a 2–2 away draw against Bayer Leverkusen.

=== VfB Stuttgart ===
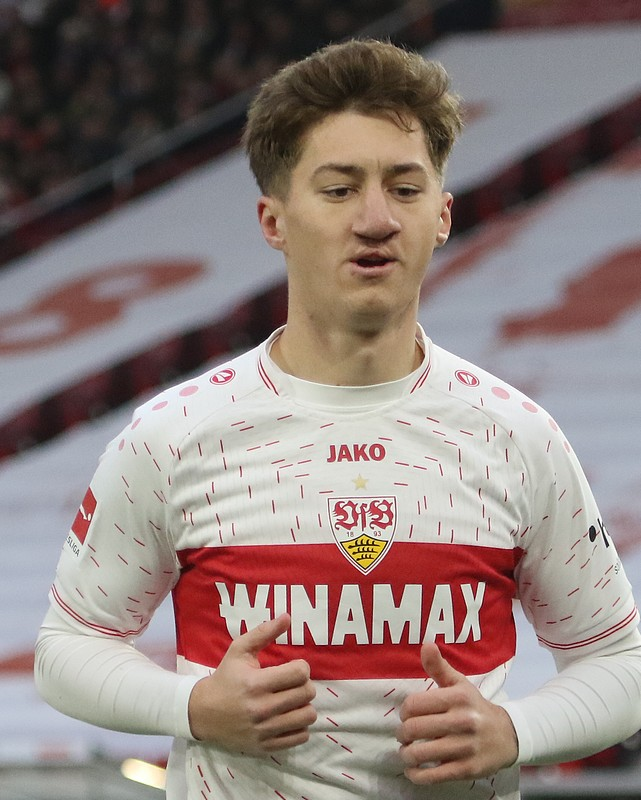
Stiller playing for VfB Stuttgart in 2023

On 25 August 2023, Stiller moved to VfB Stuttgart and signed a four-year deal. He scored his first goal for the club and provided an assist in a 3–3 draw against Heidenheim on 31 March 2024. Later that year, on 11 December, he netted his first UEFA Champions League goal in a 5–1 victory over Young Boys. In January 2025, Stiller extended his contract until 2028.

== International career ==
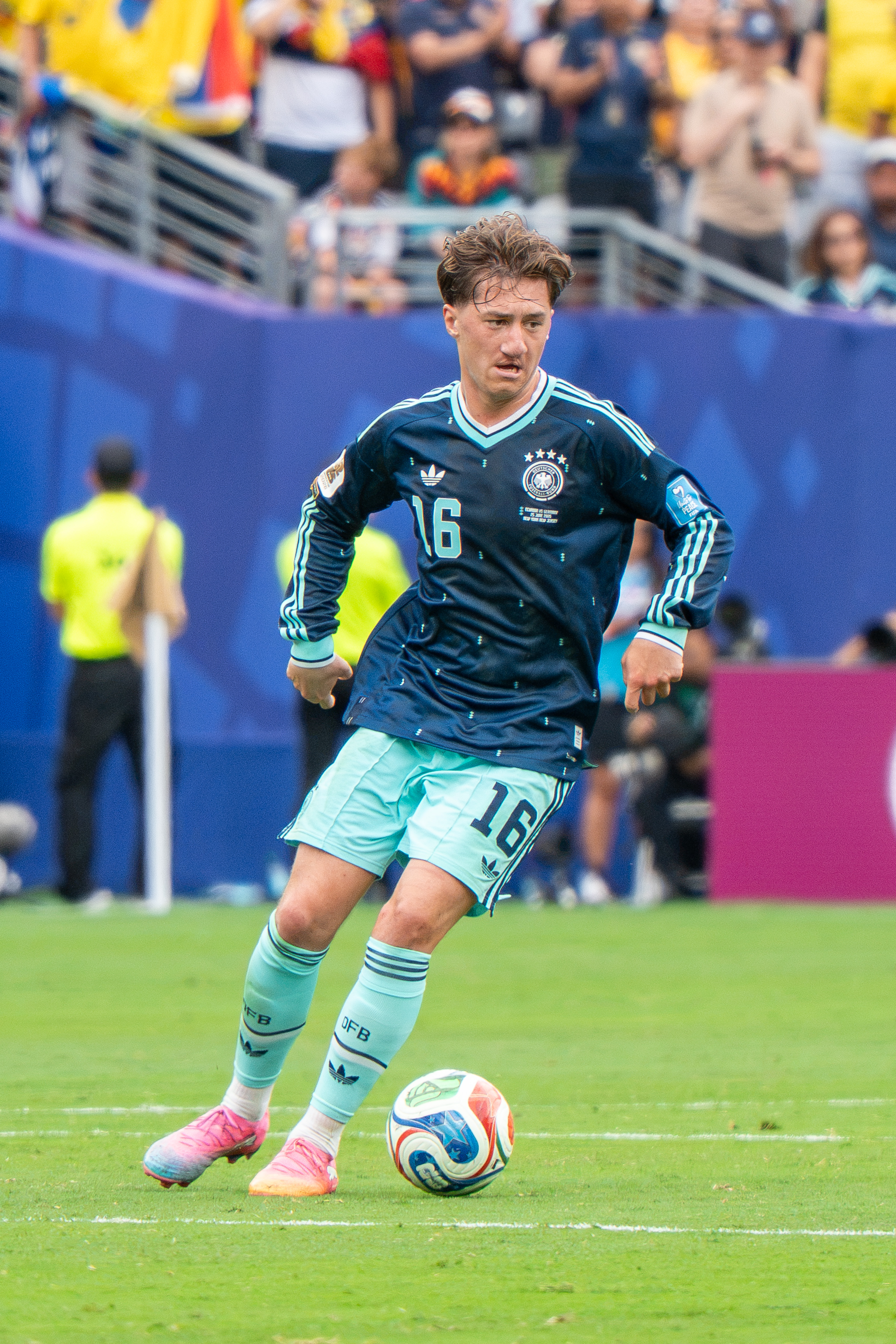
Stiller with Germany during the 2026 FIFA World Cup

Stiller was a youth international footballer for Germany; he was also eligible to represent Croatia internationally due to his maternal Croatian heritage. In August 2024, he was called up for the Germany national team ahead of the 2024–25 UEFA Nations League matches against Hungary and the Netherlands. Stiller debuted for the senior team 7 September 2024 against Hungary at the Merkur Spiel-Arena, replacing Robert Andrich in the 82nd minute of Germany's 5–0 victory. On 21 May 2026, he was called up by Julian Nagelsmann for the FIFA World Cup, marking his first international tournament.

== Career statistics ==
=== Club ===
As of match played 23 October 2026

Appearances and goals by club, season and competition
Club	Season	League			DFB-Pokal		Europe		Other		Total	
Club	Season	Division	Apps	Goals	Apps	Goals	Apps	Goals	Apps	Goals	Apps	Goals
Bayern Munich II	2019–20	3. Liga	17	0	—		—		—		17	0
Bayern Munich II	2020–21	3. Liga	33	1	—		—		—		33	1
Bayern Munich II	Total		50	1	—		—		—		50	1
Bayern Munich	2020–21	Bundesliga	0	0	1	0	2 (Note: Appearances in UEFA Champions League)	0	—		3	0
TSG Hoffenheim	2021–22	Bundesliga	26	2	3	1	—		—		29	3
TSG Hoffenheim	2022–23	Bundesliga	20	1	1	0	—		—		21	1
TSG Hoffenheim	2023–24	Bundesliga	1	0	1	0	—		—		2	0
TSG Hoffenheim	Total		47	3	5	1	—		—		52	4
TSG Hoffenheim II	2022–23	Regionalliga Südwest	2	0	—		—		—		2	0
VfB Stuttgart	2023–24	Bundesliga	31	1	3	0	—		—		34	1
VfB Stuttgart	2024–25	Bundesliga	32	1	6	2	8	1	1 (Note: Appearance in DFL-/Franz Beckenbauer Supercup)	0	47	4
VfB Stuttgart	2025–26	Bundesliga	34	2	6	0	11 (Note: Appearances in UEFA Europa League)	0	1	0	52	2
VfB Stuttgart	2026–27	Bundesliga	7	0	1	0	3	0	—		11	0
VfB Stuttgart	Total		104	4	16	2	22	1	2	0	144	7
Career total			203	8	22	3	24	1	2	0	251	12

=== International ===
As of match played 25 June 2026

Appearances and goals by national team and year
National team	Year	Apps	Goals
Germany	2024	3	0
Germany	2025	2	0
Germany	2026	4	0
Total		9	0

== Honours ==
Bayern Munich II

- 3. Liga: 2019–20

VfB Stuttgart

- DFB-Pokal: 2024–25

Individual

- Bundesliga Team of the Season: 2025–26
- The Athletic Bundesliga Team of the Season: 2023–24
