= Wahid Faghir =

Danish footballer (born 2003)

Personal information
- Full name: Wahidullah Faghir
- Date of birth: 29 July 2003 (age 23)
- Place of birth: Vejle, Denmark
- Height: 1.86 m (6 ft 1 in)
- Position: Forward

Team information
- Current team: Vejle
- Number: 19

Youth career
- 2009–2020: Vejle

Senior career*
| Years | Team | Apps | (Gls) |
| 2020–2021 | Vejle | 43 | (11) |
| 2021–2025 | VfB Stuttgart II | 30 | (12) |
| 2021–2025 | VfB Stuttgart | 6 | (1) |
| 2022–2023 | → Nordsjælland (loan) | 16 | (4) |
| 2023–2024 | → SV Elversberg (loan) | 17 | (3) |
| 2025– | Vejle | 25 | (5) |

International career^{‡}
| 2018–2019 | Denmark U16 | 6 | (3) |
| 2019–2020 | Denmark U17 | 14 | (8) |
| 2020 | Denmark U18 | 2 | (1) |
| 2022 | Denmark U19 | 2 | (0) |
| 2022 | Denmark U20 | 1 | (1) |
| 2021–2023 | Denmark U21 | 11 | (2) |
- * Club domestic league appearances and goals as of 10:07, 24 October 2026 (UTC) ‡ National team caps and goals as of 11 September 2023

Wahidullah Faghir (born 29 July 2003) is a Danish professional footballer who plays as a forward for Danish 1st Division club Vejle.

== Early life ==
Faghir was born in Vejle, Region Syddanmark, Denmark. His parents are both Afghans who fled to Denmark from Taliban rule.

== Club career ==
=== Vejle ===
Faghir started his footballing career with the Vejle BK youth academy in 2009, and signed his first official youth contract in October 2018 at age 15. Upon signing, Vejle head of youth Steen Thychosen stated that "There is a bit of 'Zlatan' [Ibrahimović, red.] about him, because he performs with an indomitable self-confidence in practice and matches."

On 13 July 2020, Faghir made his first professional appearance for Vejle, coming on as a substitute for Lucas Jensen in the 23rd minute in a match against Kolding IF. On 14 September 2020, he made his debut in the Danish Superliga in a match against AGF.

=== VfB Stuttgart ===
On the last day of the transfer window 31 August 2021, Faghir moved to Bundesliga club VfB Stuttgart, where he signed a five-year contract. A year after his arrival to the German club, Faghir was loaned out to Danish Superliga side FC Nordsjælland for the 2022–23 season. He returned to Stuttgart at the end of the season. On 19 July 2023, Faghir moved on a new season-long loan to SV Elversberg in 2. Bundesliga.

=== Return to Vejle ===
On 12 July 2025, Faghir returned to Vejle.

== International career ==
Faghir has played internationally for Denmark at under-16, under-17 and under-18 levels.

== Career statistics ==
As of match played 7 December 2024

Appearances and goals by club, season and competition
| Club | Season | League | | | National cup (Note: Includes Danish Cup, DFB-Pokal) | | Total | |
| Club | Season | Division | Apps | Goals | Apps | Goals | Apps | Goals |
|---|---|---|---|---|---|---|---|---|
| Vejle | 2019–20 | Danish 1st Division | 10 | 3 | 0 | 0 | 10 | 3 |
| Vejle | 2020–21 | Danish Superliga | 26 | 6 | 4 | 0 | 30 | 6 |
| Vejle | 2021–22 | Danish Superliga | 7 | 2 | 0 | 0 | 7 | 2 |
| Vejle | Total | | 43 | 11 | 4 | 0 | 47 | 11 |
| VfB Stuttgart | 2021–22 | Bundesliga | 6 | 1 | 1 | 0 | 7 | 1 |
| VfB Stuttgart | 2022–23 | Bundesliga | 0 | 0 | 0 | 0 | 0 | 0 |
| VfB Stuttgart | 2024–25 | Bundesliga | 0 | 0 | 0 | 0 | 0 | 0 |
| VfB Stuttgart | Total | | 6 | 1 | 1 | 0 | 7 | 1 |
| VfB Stuttgart II | 2021–22 | Regionalliga Südwest | 8 | 4 | – | | 8 | 4 |
| VfB Stuttgart II | 2024–25 | 3. Liga | 11 | 4 | – | | 11 | 4 |
| VfB Stuttgart II | Total | | 19 | 8 | – | | 19 | 8 |
| FC Nordsjælland (loan) | 2022–23 | Danish Superliga | 16 | 4 | 3 | 1 | 19 | 5 |
| SV Elversberg (loan) | 2023–24 | 2. Bundesliga | 17 | 3 | 1 | 0 | 18 | 3 |
| Career total | | | 97 | 27 | 9 | 1 | 106 | 28 |
