= Anthony Rouault =

French footballer (born 2001)

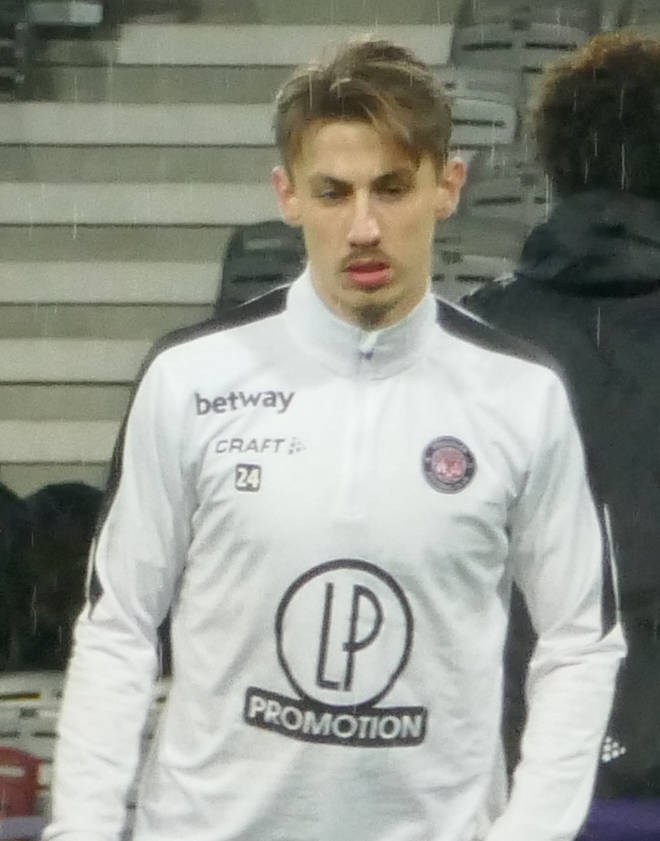
- Rouault with Toulouse in 2022

Personal information
- Date of birth: 29 May 2001 (age 25)
- Place of birth: Villeneuve-sur-Lot, France
- Height: 1.86 m (6 ft 1 in)
- Position: Centre-back

Team information
- Current team: Rennes
- Number: 24

Youth career
- 2006–2015: Saint Colomb
- 2015–2016: Marmande
- 2016–2019: Toulouse

Senior career*
Years	Team	Apps	(Gls)
2019–2020	Toulouse II	17	(1)
2020–2024	Toulouse	79	(6)
2023–2024	→ VfB Stuttgart (loan)	22	(0)
2024–2025	VfB Stuttgart	18	(1)
2025–	Rennes	32	(1)
- * Club domestic league appearances and goals as of 19 May 2026

Anthony Rouault (born 29 May 2001) is a French professional footballer who plays as a centre-back for Ligue 1 club Rennes.

== Career ==
Rouault joined the youth academy of Toulouse in 2016. He made his professional debut with Toulouse in a 1–0 Ligue 2 win over Ajaccio on 17 October 2020.

On 1 September 2023, Rouault was loaned out to VfB Stuttgart until the end of the season. When Stuttgart's place in the 2024–25 Bundesliga was mathematically confirmed in March 2024, Rouault joined the German club automatically in a permanent deal with a contract until June 2027.

On 3 February 2025, Rouault returned to France and signed a four-and-a-half year contract with Rennes.

== Career statistics ==
As of match played 1 February 2025

Appearances and goals by club, season and competition
Club	Season	League			National cup (Note: Includes Coupe de France, DFB-Pokal)		Europe		Other		Total	
Club	Season	Division	Apps	Goals	Apps	Goals	Apps	Goals	Apps	Goals	Apps	Goals
Toulouse II	2018–19	CFA 2	8	0	—		—		—		8	0
Toulouse II	2019–20	CFA 2	8	0	—		—		—		8	0
Toulouse II	2020–21	CFA 2	1	1	—		—		—		1	1
Toulouse II	Total		17	1	—		—		—		17	1
Toulouse	2020–21	Ligue 2	15	0	3	0	—		0	0	18	0
Toulouse	2021–22	Ligue 2	27	4	1	0	—		—		28	4
Toulouse	2022–23	Ligue 1	37	2	3	0	—		—		40	2
Toulouse	2023–24	Ligue 1	0	0	0	0	—		—		0	0
Toulouse	Total		79	6	7	0	—		—		86	6
VfB Stuttgart (loan)	2023–24	Bundesliga	22	0	2	0	—		—		24	0
VfB Stuttgart	2024–25	Bundesliga	18	1	2	0	7 (Note: Appearances in UEFA Champions League)	0	1 (Note: Appearance in DFL Supercup)	0	28	1
Rennes	2024–25	Ligue 1	0	0	0	0	—		—		0	0
Career total			136	8	11	0	7	0	1	0	155	8

== Honours ==
VfB Stuttgart

- DFB-Pokal: 2024–25

Toulouse

- Coupe de France: 2022–23
- Ligue 2: 2021–22

Individual

- UNFP Ligue 2 Team of the Year: 2021–22
