= Ermedin Demirović =

Bosnian footballer (born 1998)

Personal information
- Date of birth: 25 March 1998 (age 28)
- Place of birth: Hamburg, Germany
- Height: 1.85 m (6 ft 1 in)
- Position: Forward

Team information
- Current team: VfB Stuttgart
- Number: 9

Youth career
- 2004–2014: Hamburger SV
- 2014–2017: RB Leipzig

Senior career*
Years	Team	Apps	(Gls)
2017	RB Leipzig II	1	(1)
2017–2020	Alavés	3	(1)
2018–2019	→ Sochaux (loan)	16	(4)
2019	→ Almería (loan)	13	(0)
2019–2020	→ St. Gallen (loan)	28	(14)
2020–2022	SC Freiburg	61	(7)
2022–2024	FC Augsburg	63	(23)
2024–	VfB Stuttgart	69	(32)

International career^{‡}
2014–2015	Bosnia and Herzegovina U17	14	(4)
2015–2017	Bosnia and Herzegovina U19	16	(5)
2017–2020	Bosnia and Herzegovina U21	13	(4)
2021–	Bosnia and Herzegovina	50	(4)
- * Club domestic league appearances and goals as of 21 November 2026 ‡ National team caps and goals as of 17 November 2026

Ermedin Demirović (pronounced [ermědin děmiroʋitɕ]; born 25 March 1998) is a professional footballer who plays as a forward for Bundesliga club VfB Stuttgart. Born in Germany, he plays for the Bosnia and Herzegovina national team.

Demirović started his professional career at RB Leipzig, playing mainly in its reserve team, before joining Alavés in 2017. He was loaned to Sochaux in 2018, to Almería in 2019 and to St. Gallen later that year. In 2020, he moved to SC Freiburg. Two years later, Demirović signed with FC Augsburg. In 2024, he was transferred to VfB Stuttgart.

A former youth international for Bosnia and Herzegovina, Demirović made his senior international debut in 2021, earning 50 caps since. He represented the nation at the 2026 FIFA World Cup.

== Club career ==
=== Early career ===
Demirović started playing football at his hometown club Hamburger SV, before joining RB Leipzig's youth academy in 2014.

=== Alavés ===
In May, Demirović signed a four-year deal with Spanish team Alavés. He made his professional debut in a Copa del Rey game against Formentera on 3 January 2018 and scored a brace. Three weeks later, he made his league debut against Barcelona. On 6 May, he scored his first league goal in a triumph over Málaga.

In July, Demirović was loaned to French side Sochaux until the end of the season.

In January 2019, he was sent on a six-month loan to Almería.

In September, he was loaned to Swiss outfit St. Gallen for the remainder of the campaign.

=== SC Freiburg ===
In July 2020, Demirović was transferred to SC Freiburg for an undisclosed fee. He made his official debut for the club in a DFB-Pokal match against Waldhof Mannheim on 13 September. Two weeks later, he made his league debut against VfL Wolfsburg. On 20 December, he scored his first goal for SC Freiburg in a defeat of Hertha BSC.

=== FC Augsburg ===
In July 2022, Demirović switched to FC Augsburg on a contract until June 2026. He made his competitive debut for the squad in a DFB-Pokal tie on 31 July against Blau-Weiß Lohne. A week later, he made his league debut against SC Freiburg. On 20 August, he scored his first goal for FC Augsburg against Mainz 05.

In August 2023, he was named team captain.

=== VfB Stuttgart ===
In July 2024, Demirović moved to VfB Stuttgart on a four-year deal. He debuted officially for the side in the DFL-Supercup fixture against Bayer Leverkusen on 17 August. A week later, he made his league debut against SC Freiburg and managed to score a goal.

He debuted in the UEFA Champions League away at Real Madrid on 17 September. Two months later, he scored his first goal in the competition against Red Star Belgrade.

Demirović scored his first career hat-trick in a victory over VfL Bochum on 5 April 2025.

He won his first trophy with the club on 24 May, by beating Arminia Bielefeld in the DFB-Pokal final.

Demirović scored his first UEFA Champions League hat-trick in a win over Viking on 9 September 2026.

He made his 100th appearance for the squad on 31 October against Bayer Leverkusen and managed to score a brace.

== International career ==
Demirović represented Bosnia and Herzegovina at all youth levels.

In November 2018, he received his first senior call up, for a 2018–19 UEFA Nations League B game against Austria and a friendly match against Spain, but had to wait until 24 March 2021 to make his debut in a 2022 FIFA World Cup qualifier against Finland.

On 23 September 2022, in a 2022–23 UEFA Nations League B tie against Montenegro, he scored his first senior international goal, which secured the victory for his team.

In June 2026, Demirović was named in Bosnia and Herzegovina's squad for the 2026 FIFA World Cup. He made his tournament debut in the opening group fixture against Canada on 12 June.

== Personal life ==
Demirović married his long-time girlfriend Sandra in September 2024. Together they have a daughter named Leana.

He is a practising Muslim; together with international teammates Amar Dedić, Tarik Muharemović and Dženis Burnić he visited a mosque in Sarajevo during the national team's concentration.

== Career statistics ==
=== Club ===
As of match played 21 November 2026

Appearances and goals by club, season and competition
Club	Season	League			National cup (Note: Includes Copa del Rey, DFB-Pokal)		League cup (Note: Includes Coupe de la Ligue)		Continental		Other		Total	
Club	Season	Division	Apps	Goals	Apps	Goals	Apps	Goals	Apps	Goals	Apps	Goals	Apps	Goals
RB Leipzig II	2016–17	Regionalliga Nordost	1	1	–		–		–		–		1	1
Alavés	2017–18	La Liga	3	1	3	3	–		–		–		6	4
Sochaux (loan)	2018–19	Ligue 2	16	4	0	0	1	0	–		–		17	4
Almería (loan)	2018–19	Segunda División	13	0	–		–		–		–		13	0
St. Gallen (loan)	2019–20	Swiss Super League	28	14	0	0	–		–		–		28	14
SC Freiburg	2020–21	Bundesliga	30	5	2	0	–		–		–		32	5
SC Freiburg	2021–22	Bundesliga	31	2	6	1	–		–		–		37	3
SC Freiburg	Total		61	7	8	1	–		–		–		69	8
FC Augsburg	2022–23	Bundesliga	30	8	2	0	–		–		–		32	8
FC Augsburg	2023–24	Bundesliga	33	15	1	0	–		–		–		34	15
FC Augsburg	Total		63	23	3	0	–		–		–		66	23
VfB Stuttgart	2024–25	Bundesliga	34	15	6	1	–		8 (Note: Appearances in UEFA Champions League)	1	1 (Note: Appearance in Franz Beckenbauer Supercup)	0	49	17
VfB Stuttgart	2025–26	Bundesliga	25	12	4	2	–		8 (Note: Appearances in UEFA Europa League)	1	1	0	38	15
VfB Stuttgart	2026–27	Bundesliga	10	5	2	0	–		4	4	–		16	9
VfB Stuttgart	Total		69	32	12	3	–		20	6	2	0	103	41
Career total			254	82	26	7	1	0	20	6	2	0	303	95

=== International ===
As of match played 17 November 2026

Appearances and goals by national team and year
National team	Year	Apps	Goals
Bosnia and Herzegovina
Bosnia and Herzegovina	2021	10	0
Bosnia and Herzegovina	2022	5	1
Bosnia and Herzegovina	2023	8	0
Bosnia and Herzegovina	2024	8	2
Bosnia and Herzegovina	2025	5	1
Bosnia and Herzegovina	2026	14	0
Total		50	4

Scores and results list Bosnia and Herzegovina's goal tally first, score column indicates score after each Demirović goal.

List of international goals scored by Ermedin Demirović
No.	Date	Venue	Cap	Opponent	Score	Result	Competition
1	23 September 2022	Bilino Polje, Zenica, Bosnia and Herzegovina	14	Montenegro	1–0	1–0	2022–23 UEFA Nations League B
2	7 September 2024	Philips Stadion, Eindhoven, Netherlands	27	Netherlands	1–1	2–5	2024–25 UEFA Nations League A
3	19 November 2024	Bilino Polje, Zenica, Bosnia and Herzegovina	31	Netherlands	1–1	1–1	2024–25 UEFA Nations League A
4	24 March 2025	Bilino Polje, Zenica, Bosnia and Herzegovina	33	Cyprus	1–0	2–1	2026 FIFA World Cup qualification

== Honours ==
VfB Stuttgart

- DFB-Pokal: 2024–25
