= Enzo Millot =

French footballer (born 2002)

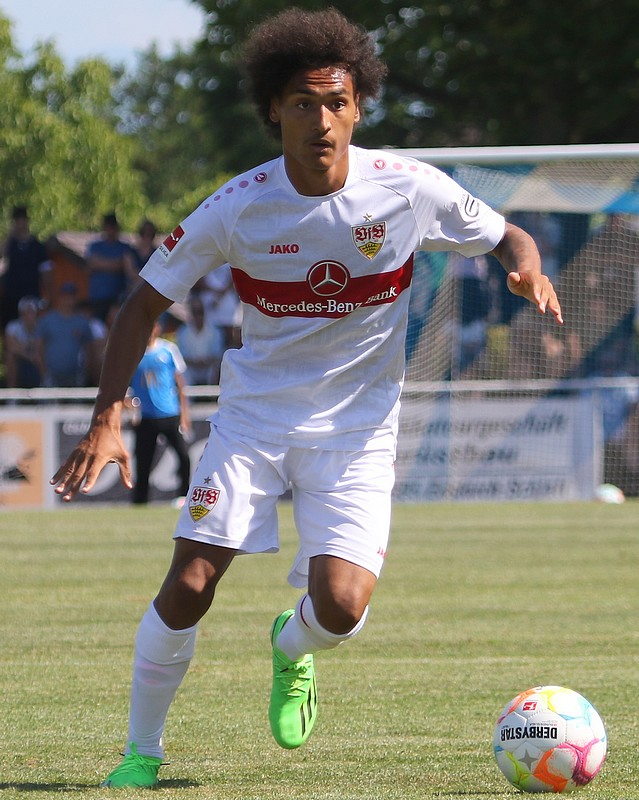
- Millot playing for VfB Stuttgart in 2022

Personal information
- Full name: Enzo Camille Alain Millot
- Date of birth: 17 July 2002 (age 24)
- Place of birth: Le Chesnay, Yvelines, France
- Height: 1.75 m (5 ft 9 in)
- Position: Midfielder

Team information
- Current team: Al-Diriyah (on loan from Al-Ahli)
- Number: 20

Youth career
- 2008–2010: Étoile de Brou
- 2010–2015: Chartres
- 2015–2017: Drouais
- 2017–2019: Monaco

Senior career*
Years	Team	Apps	(Gls)
2019–2020	Monaco II	9	(2)
2020–2021	Monaco	2	(0)
2021	VfB Stuttgart II	2	(0)
2021–2025	VfB Stuttgart	89	(11)
2025–	Al-Ahli	24	(3)
2026–	→ Al-Diriyah (loan)	8	(0)

International career^{‡}
2018	France U16	10	(2)
2018–2019	France U17	17	(2)
2019	France U18	6	(1)
2024–2025	France U21	6	(0)
2024	France Olympic	8	(2)
Medal record
Men's football
Representing (France) France
Olympic Games
Silver medal – second place	2024 Paris	Team
FIFA U-17 World Cup
Third place	2019
UEFA European Under-17 Championship
Bronze medal – third place	2019
- * Club domestic league appearances and goals as of 23:50, 20 October 2026 (UTC) ‡ National team caps and goals as of 24 March 2025

Enzo Camille Alain Millot (born 17 July 2002) is a French professional footballer who plays as a midfielder for Saudi Pro League club Al-Diriyah, on loan from Al-Ahli.

== Club career ==
=== Monaco ===
On 30 July 2019, Millot signed his first professional contract with Monaco. Millot made his professional debut with Monaco in a 1–0 Ligue 1 loss to Brest on 4 October 2020.

=== VfB Stuttgart ===
On 14 August 2021, Millot signed a four-year-contract with VfB Stuttgart. On 5 April 2023, he scored his first ever goal for VfB Stuttgart against 1. FC Nürnberg in quarter-finals DFB-Pokal.

On 12 January 2024, Millot extended his contract with VfB Stuttgart until June 2028.

=== Al-Ahli ===
On 9 August 2025, Millot signed a three-year contract with Al-Ahli in Saudi Arabia. A month later, on 15 September, he scored his first goals by netting a brace in a 4–2 victory over Nasaf Qarshi in the AFC Champions League Elite.

On 22 August 2026, Millot joined newly promoted fellow Saudi side Al-Diriyah on loan for the 2026–27 season.

== Personal life ==
Millot was born in Le Chesnay, Yvelines, France, and is of Martiniquais and Malagasy descent. His father was a former amateur footballer. He is married to his wife Louana and has two children: a son and a daughter. He is a Christian.

== Career statistics ==
As of match played 20 October 2026

Appearances and goals by club, season and competition
Club	Season	League			National cup (Note: Includes Coupe de France, DFB-Pokal, King's Cup)		Continental		Other		Total	
Club	Season	Division	Apps	Goals	Apps	Goals	Apps	Goals	Apps	Goals	Apps	Goals
Monaco II	2019–20	CFA 2	9	2	—		—		—		9	2
Monaco	2020–21	Ligue 1	2	0	1	0	—		—		3	0
VfB Stuttgart II	2021–22	Regionalliga Südwest	2	0	—		—		—		2	0
VfB Stuttgart	2021–22	Bundesliga	6	0	0	0	—		—		6	0
VfB Stuttgart	2022–23	Bundesliga	23	0	4	2	—		2 (Note: Appearances in Bundesliga relegation play-offs)	2	29	4
VfB Stuttgart	2023–24	Bundesliga	31	5	4	1	—		—		35	6
VfB Stuttgart	2024–25	Bundesliga	29	6	5	3	8 (Note: Appearances in UEFA Champions League)	2	1 (Note: Appearance in DFL-Supercup)	1	43	12
VfB Stuttgart	Total		89	11	13	6	8	2	3	3	113	22
Al-Ahli	2025–26	Saudi Pro League	24	3	2	1	11 (Note: Appearances in AFC Champions League Elite)	4	3 (Note: Two appearances and one goal in Saudi Super Cup, one appearance in FIFA Intercontinental Cup)	1	40	9
Al-Diriyah (loan)	2026–27	Saudi Pro League	8	0	—		—		—		8	0
Career total			134	16	16	7	19	6	6	4	175	33

== Honours ==
VfB Stuttgart

- DFB-Pokal: 2024–25

Al-Ahli

- AFC Champions League Elite: 2025–26
- Saudi Super Cup: 2025

France U17

- FIFA U-17 World Cup third place: 2019

France U23

- Summer Olympics silver medal: 2024

Individual

- UEFA European Under-17 Championship Team of the Tournament: 2019

Orders

- Knight of the National Order of Merit: 2024
