= Justin Diehl =

German footballer (born 2004)

Personal information
- Date of birth: 27 November 2004 (age 21)
- Place of birth: Cologne, Germany
- Height: 1.74 m (5 ft 9 in)
- Position: Forward

Team information
- Current team: VfB Stuttgart
- Number: 31

Youth career
- –2011: JFS Köln
- 2011–2022: 1. FC Köln

Senior career*
Years	Team	Apps	(Gls)
2022–2024	1. FC Köln	9	(0)
2023–2024	1. FC Köln II	19	(12)
2024–	VfB Stuttgart	6	(1)
2024–	VfB Stuttgart II	28	(4)

International career^{‡}
2019–2020	Germany U16	5	(1)
2021	Germany U18	3	(2)
2022–	Germany U19	7	(1)
- * Club domestic league appearances and goals as of 30 May 2026 ‡ National team caps and goals as of 28 March 2023

Justin Diehl (born 27 November 2004) is a German professional footballer who plays as a forward for Bundesliga club VfB Stuttgart.

== Club career ==
On 7 August 2020, Diehl signed his first professional contract with FC Köln until 2023. He made his professional debut for Köln on 21 January 2023.

On 22 May 2024, VfB Stuttgart announced that they had signed Diehl on a five-year-contract. He officially joined on 1 July 2024.

== International career ==
Born in Germany, Diehl is of Ghanaian descent. He is a youth international for Germany, having played up to the Germany U19s.

== Career statistics ==
As of match played 15 February 2025

Appearances and goals by club, season and competition
Club	Season	League			Cup		Europe		Other		Total	
Club	Season	Division	Apps	Goals	Apps	Goals	Apps	Goals	Apps	Goals	Apps	Goals
1. FC Köln	2022–23	Bundesliga	2	0	0	0	—		—		2	0
1. FC Köln	2023–24	Bundesliga	7	0	0	0	—		—		7	0
1. FC Köln	Total		9	0	0	0	—		—		9	0
1. FC Köln II	2023–24	Regionalliga West	19	12	—		—		—		19	12
VfB Stuttgart	2024–25	Bundesliga	5	1	2	0	0	0	1 (Note: Appearance in DFL-Supercup)	0	8	1
Career total			33	1	2	0	0	0	1	0	36	13
