= Yannik Keitel =

German footballer (born 2000)

Personal information
- Date of birth: 15 February 2000 (age 26)
- Place of birth: Breisach, Germany
- Height: 1.86 m (6 ft 1 in)
- Position: Defensive midfielder

Team information
- Current team: FC Augsburg (on loan from VfB Stuttgart)
- Number: 14

Youth career
- –2011: SV Breisach
- 2011–2019: SC Freiburg

Senior career*
Years	Team	Apps	(Gls)
2018–2021	SC Freiburg II	23	(3)
2020–2024	SC Freiburg	64	(1)
2024–	VfB Stuttgart	11	(0)
2025–	VfB Stuttgart II	2	(0)
2026–	→ FC Augsburg (loan)	10	(0)

International career^{‡}
2015	Germany U15	1	(0)
2016–2017	Germany U16	16	(3)
2020–2023	Germany U21	15	(0)
- * Club domestic league appearances and goals as of 31 October 2026 ‡ National team caps and goals as of 19:14, 28 June 2023 (UTC)

Yannik Keitel (born 15 February 2000) is a German professional footballer who plays as a central or defensive midfielder for Bundesliga club FC Augsburg, on loan from VfB Stuttgart. He has represented Germany internationally at several youth levels.

== Club career ==
Keitel joined SC Freiburg in 2010 from SV Breisach. On 29 February 2020, he made his professional debut in the Bundesliga in a 1–0 league defeat away to Borussia Dortmund. He came on as a substitute at halftime for the injured Janik Haberer. In April 2020, he signed his first professional contract.

=== VfB Stuttgart ===
On 21 May 2024, VfB Stuttgart announced the signing of Keitel on a free transfer for the 2024–25 season. Keitel signed a contract until 2028.

On 3 January 2026, Keitel was loaned by FC Augsburg, with an option to buy.

== Career statistics ==
As of match played 31 October 2026

Appearances and goals by club, season and competition
Club	Season	League			DFB-Pokal		Continental		Other		Total	
Club	Season	Division	Apps	Goals	Apps	Goals	Apps	Goals	Apps	Goals	Apps	Goals
SC Freiburg II	2018–19	Regionalliga Südwest	1	0	—		—		—		1	0
SC Freiburg II	2019–20	Regionalliga Südwest	17	2	—		—		—		17	2
SC Freiburg II	2020–21	Regionalliga Südwest	5	1	—		—		—		5	1
SC Freiburg II	Total		23	3	—		—		—		23	3
SC Freiburg	2019–20	Bundesliga	3	0	0	0	—		—		3	0
SC Freiburg	2020–21	Bundesliga	12	0	1	0	—		—		13	0
SC Freiburg	2021–22	Bundesliga	12	0	2	0	—		—		14	0
SC Freiburg	2022–23	Bundesliga	22	0	2	0	7 (Note: Appearances in UEFA Europa League)	0	—		31	0
SC Freiburg	2023–24	Bundesliga	14	0	1	0	2	0	—		17	0
SC Freiburg	Total		63	0	6	0	9	0	0	0	78	0
VfB Stuttgart	2024–25	Bundesliga	11	0	2	0	4 (Note: Appearances in UEFA Champions League)	1	1 (Note: Appearance in DFL Supercup)	0	18	1
Augsburg (loan)	2025–26	Bundesliga	6	0	—		—		—		6	0
Augsburg (loan)	2026–27	Bundesliga	4	0	2	0	—		—		6	0
Augsburg (loan)	Total		10	0	2	0	—		—		12	0
Career total			107	3	10	0	13	1	1	0	131	4

== Honours ==
VfB Stuttgart

- DFB-Pokal: 2024–25
