= Mohamed Sankoh =

Dutch footballer

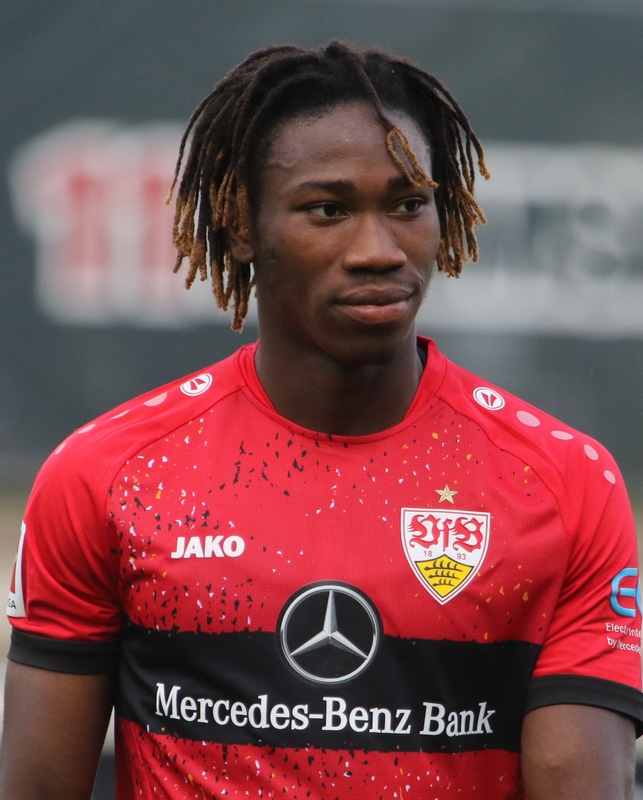
- Sankoh with VfB Stuttgart in 2021

Personal information
- Full name: Mohamed Ortaim Sankoh
- Date of birth: 16 October 2003 (age 23)
- Place of birth: Rijswijk, Netherlands
- Height: 1.83 m (6 ft 0 in)
- Position: Striker

Team information
- Current team: Randers
- Number: 30

Youth career
- –2013: KRSV Vredenburch
- 2013–2018: Sparta Rotterdam
- 2018–2020: Stoke City
- 2020–2021: VfB Stuttgart

Senior career*
| Years | Team | Apps | (Gls) |
| 2020–2026 | VfB Stuttgart II | 62 | (18) |
| 2021–2026 | VfB Stuttgart | 2 | (1) |
| 2022–2023 | → Vitesse (loan) | 21 | (2) |
| 2023–2024 | → Heracles Almelo (loan) | 28 | (6) |
| 2024–2025 | → Cosenza (loan) | 9 | (0) |
| 2026– | Randers | 0 | (0) |

International career
| 2018 | Netherlands U16 | 3 | (0) |
| 2019 | Netherlands U17 | 3 | (0) |
- * Club domestic league appearances and goals as of 30 May 2026

Mohamed Ortaim Sankoh (born 16 October 2003) is a Dutch professional footballer who plays as a striker for Danish Superliga club Randers.

== Club career ==
In the summer of 2020, Sankoh moved to VfB Stuttgart. He made his debut for the first team of Stuttgart in the Bundesliga on 25 April 2021 against RB Leipzig.

On 18 November 2021, Sankoh extended his contract with VfB Stuttgart until June 2026.

On 22 July 2022, he moved to Vitesse on loan.

On 1 September 2023, Sankoh returned to the Netherlands and joined Heracles Almelo on loan.

On 21 August 2024, Sankoh was loaned by Cosenza in the Italian Serie B. On 3 January 2025, Sankoh was recalled from loan early.

On 6 July 2026, Sankoh signed a four-season deal with Randers in Denmark.

== International career ==
Born in the Netherlands, Sankoh is of Sierra Leonean descent. He is a youth international for the Netherlands, and helped the Netherlands U17s win the 2019 UEFA European Under-17 Championship.

== Honours ==
Netherlands U17

- UEFA European Under-17 Championship: 2019
