= Thomas Kastanaras =

German footballer (born 2003)

Personal information
- Date of birth: 9 January 2003 (age 23)
- Place of birth: Stuttgart, Germany
- Height: 1.85 m (6 ft 1 in)
- Position: Forward

Team information
- Current team: Würzburger Kickers
- Number: 19

Youth career
- TB Untertürkheim
- FSV Waiblingen
- 2011–2022: VfB Stuttgart

Senior career*
| Years | Team | Apps | (Gls) |
| 2021–2026 | VfB Stuttgart II | 71 | (23) |
| 2022–2025 | VfB Stuttgart | 4 | (0) |
| 2024 | → SSV Ulm (loan) | 16 | (3) |
| 2026 | FC Augsburg II | 18 | (6) |
| 2026– | Würzburger Kickers | 0 | (0) |

International career^{‡}
| 2019 | Greece U17 | 3 | (0) |
| 2021 | Greece U19 | 4 | (0) |
| 2022 | Germany U20 | 2 | (0) |
- * Club domestic league appearances and goals as of 1 September 2026 ‡ National team caps and goals as of 26 September 2022

Thomas Kastanaras (Greek: Θωμάς Καστανάρας; born 9 January 2003) is a professional footballer who plays as a forward for 3. Liga club Würzburger Kickers. Born in Germany, he represented Greece internationally on junior levels, before switching allegiance to Germany.

== Club career ==
Kastanaras played for the youth teams of TB Untertürkheim and FSV Waiblingen before he joined VfB Stuttgart in 2011. On 3 March 2022, he extended his contract with VfB Stuttgart until June 2025. After leading the club's under-19 side in scoring with 26 goals during the 2021–22 season, Kastanaras was promoted to Stuttgart's senior side for the 2022–23 season. Kastanaras made his Bundesliga debut for Stuttgart on 17 September 2022 against Eintracht Frankfurt.

On 2 January 2024, Kastanaras joined SSV Ulm in 3. Liga on loan.

On 2 February 2026, Kastanaras signed a one-and-a-half-year contract with FC Augsburg and was assigned to their reserve team FC Augsburg II.

== International career ==
Born in Germany, Kastanaras is of Greek descent. He formerly represented Greece internationally up to the Greece U19s, before switching to represent the Germany U20s in 2022.
