= 2025 Franz Beckenbauer Supercup =

German Supercup
- Event: Franz Beckenbauer Supercup
VfB Stuttgart	Bayern Munich
1	2
- Date: 16 August 2025
- Venue: MHPArena, Stuttgart
- Man of the Match: Manuel Neuer (Bayern Munich)
- Referee: Harm Osmers (Hanover)
- Attendance: 60,000

The 2025 Franz Beckenbauer Supercup was the 16th edition of the German super cup organised by the DFL, known as the Franz Beckenbauer Supercup, an annual football match contested by the winners of the previous season's Bundesliga and DFB-Pokal competitions. The match was played on 16 August 2025.

The match featured VfB Stuttgart, the winners of the 2024–25 DFB-Pokal, and Bayern Munich, the winners of the 2024–25 Bundesliga. The match was hosted by VfB Stuttgart at the MHPArena in Stuttgart. This was the first edition of the competition since being renamed in honour of Franz Beckenbauer, who died in January 2024.

Bayern Munich won the match 2–1 for their 11th Supercup title.

== Teams ==
In the following table, matches until 1996 were in the DFB-Supercup era, since 2010 were in the DFL-Supercup era.

Team	Qualification	Previous appearances (bold indicates winners)
VfB Stuttgart	2024–25 DFB-Pokal winners	2 (**1992**, 2024)
Bayern Munich	2024–25 Bundesliga champions	17 (**1987**, 1989, **1990**, 1994, **2010**, **2012**, 2013, 2014, 2015, **2016**, **2017**, **2018**, 2019, **2020**, **2021**, **2022**, 2023)

== Match ==
=== Details ===
16 August 2025
20:30 CEST

VfB Stuttgart	1–2	Bayern Munich
Leweling 90+3'	Report (DFB); Report (DFL)	Kane 18'; Díaz 77'

MHPArena, Stuttgart
Attendance: 60,000
Referee: Harm Osmers (Hanover)

**VfB Stuttgart**	**Bayern Munich**

GK	**1**	(Germany) Fabian Bredlow
RB	**4**	(Germany) Josha Vagnoman		(substituted off) 81'
CB	**14**	(Switzerland) Luca Jaquez
CB	**24**	(Germany) Jeff Chabot		(substituted off) 71'
LB	**7**	(Germany) Maximilian Mittelstädt	(yellow card) 44'
RM	**18**	(Germany) Jamie Leweling
CM	**16**	(Turkey) Atakan Karazor (c)		(substituted off) 81'
CM	**6**	(Germany) Angelo Stiller		(substituted off) 87'
LM	**10**	(Germany) Chris Führich		(substituted off) 71'
SS	**26**	(Germany) Deniz Undav
CF	**11**	(Germany) Nick Woltemade
Substitutes:
GK	**21**	(Germany) Stefan Drljača
DF	**3**	(Netherlands) Ramon Hendriks		(substituted on) 71'
DF	**15**	(Germany) Pascal Stenzel
DF	**22**	(France) Lorenz Assignon		(substituted on) 81'
DF	**29**	(Germany) Finn Jeltsch
MF	**28**	(Denmark) Nikolas Nartey		(substituted on) 81'
MF	**30**	(Spain) Chema Andrés		(substituted on) 87'
FW	**9**	(Bosnia and Herzegovina) Ermedin Demirović		(substituted on) 71'
FW	**45**	(Serbia) Lazar Jovanović
Other disciplinary actions:
TS	—	(Germany) David Krecidlo	(yellow card) 60'
Manager:
(Germany) Sebastian Hoeneß

GK	**1**	(Germany) Manuel Neuer (c)
RB	**27**	(Austria) Konrad Laimer		(substituted off) 72'
CB	**2**	(France) Dayot Upamecano	(yellow card) 35'	(substituted off) 80'
CB	**4**	(Germany) Jonathan Tah
LB	**44**	(Croatia) Josip Stanišić
CM	**6**	(Germany) Joshua Kimmich
CM	**8**	(Germany) Leon Goretzka		(substituted off) 90+3'
RW	**7**	(Germany) Serge Gnabry		(substituted off) 80'
AM	**17**	(France) Michael Olise	(yellow card) 45'	(substituted off) 90+3'
LW	**14**	(Colombia) Luis Díaz
CF	**9**	(England) Harry Kane	(yellow card) 57'
Substitutes:
GK	**26**	(Germany) Sven Ulreich
GK	**40**	(Germany) Jonas Urbig
DF	**3**	(South Korea) Kim Min-jae		(substituted on) 80'
DF	**22**	(Portugal) Raphaël Guerreiro		(substituted on) 80'
DF	**23**	(France) Sacha Boey		(substituted on) 72'
MF	**20**	(Germany) Tom Bischof		(substituted on) 90+3'
MF	**42**	(Germany) Lennart Karl		(substituted on) 90+3'
FW	**36**	(Germany) Wisdom Mike
FW	**41**	(Sweden) Jonah Kusi-Asare
Other disciplinary actions:
TS	—	(England) Aaron Danks	(yellow card) 60'
Manager:
(Belgium) Vincent Kompany

Man of the Match:
Manuel Neuer (Bayern Munich)

Assistant referees:
Dominik Schaal (Tübingen)
Christian Gittelmann (Gauersheim)
Fourth official:
Tom Bauer (Mainz)
Video assistant referee:
Sascha Stegemann (Niederkassel)
Assistant video assistant referee:
Frederick Assmuth (Cologne)

**Match rules**

- 90 minutes
- Penalty shoot-out if scores level
- Maximum of nine named substitutes
- Maximum of five substitutions
- Maximum of three substitution opportunities

== See also ==
- 2024–25 Bundesliga
- 2024–25 DFB-Pokal
