= 2026 DFB-Pokal final =

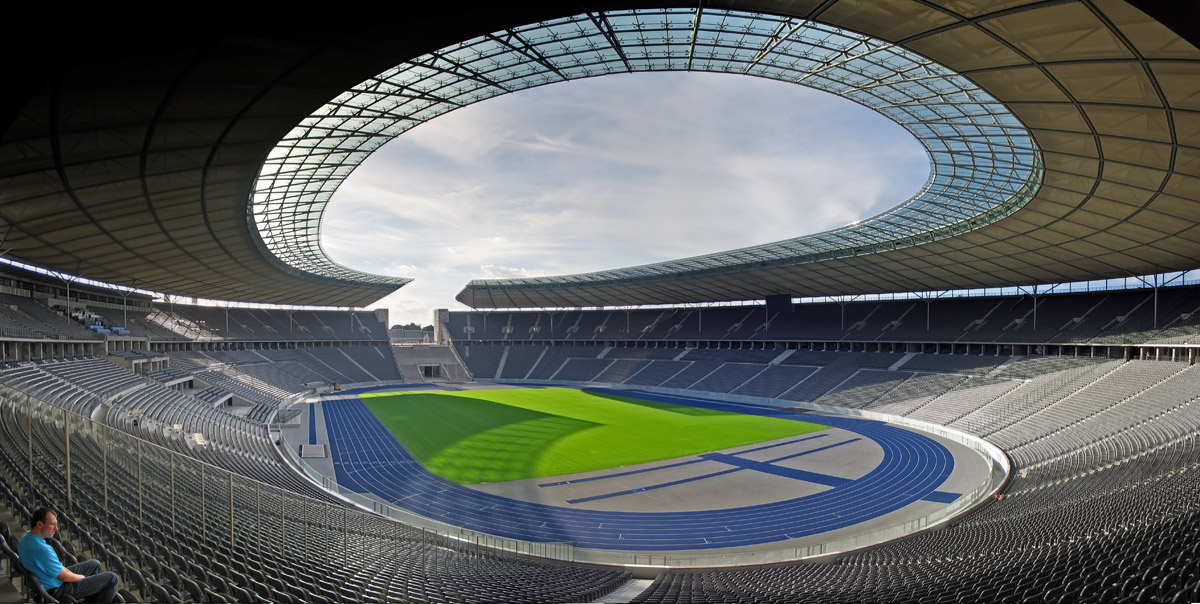
- The Olympiastadion in Berlin hosted the final.
- Event: 2025–26 DFB-Pokal
Bayern Munich	VfB Stuttgart
3	0
- Date: 23 May 2026
- Venue: Olympiastadion, Berlin
- Referee: Sven Jablonski (Bremen)
- Attendance: 74,036

The 2026 DFB-Pokal final decided the winner of the 2025–26 DFB-Pokal, the 83rd season of the annual German football cup competition. The match was played on 23 May 2026 at the Olympiastadion in Berlin.

The match featured Bayern Munich, record 20-time winners of the competition, and VfB Stuttgart, the defending champions.

Bayern Munich won the match 3–0, thanks to Harry Kane's second half flawless hat-trick or lupenreiner, a hat-trick uninterrupted by half-time or goals by other players.

It was Bayern's 21st DFB-Pokal title and the win completed a domestic double; they therefore faced Bundesliga runners-up Borussia Dortmund in the 2026 Franz Beckenbauer Supercup.

Furthermore, since Bayern already qualified for the Champions League through the Bundesliga, the sixth-placed team in the Bundesliga, Bayer Leverkusen, earned qualification for the group stage of the 2026–27 UEFA Europa League, and the play-off round spot of the 2026–27 UEFA Conference League went to the team in seventh, SC Freiburg.

== Teams ==
In the following table, finals until 1943 were in the Tschammerpokal era, since 1953 were in the DFB-Pokal era.

Team	Previous final appearances (bold indicates winners)
Bayern Munich	24 (**1957**, **1966**, **1967**, **1969**, **1971**, **1982**, **1984**, 1985, **1986**, **1998**, 1999, **2000**, **2003**, **2005**, **2006**, **2008**, **2010**, 2012, **2013**, **2014**, **2016**, 2018, **2019**, **2020**)
VfB Stuttgart	7 (**1954**, **1958**, 1986, **1997**, 2007, 2013, **2025**)

== Route to the final ==
The DFB-Pokal began with 64 teams in a single-elimination knockout cup competition. There were a total of five rounds leading up to the final. Teams were drawn against each other, and the winner after 90 minutes advanced. If still tied, 30 minutes of extra time were played. If the score was still level, a penalty shoot-out was used to determine the winner.

Note: In all results below, the score of the finalist is given first (H: home; A: away).

Bayern Munich		Round	VfB Stuttgart	
Opponent	Result	2025–26 DFB-Pokal	Opponent	Result
Wehen Wiesbaden	3–2 (A)	First round	Eintracht Braunschweig	4–4 (a.e.t.) (8–7 p) (A)
1. FC Köln	4–1 (A)	Second round	Mainz 05	2–0 (A)
Union Berlin	3–2 (A)	Round of 16	VfL Bochum	2–0 (A)
RB Leipzig	2–0 (H)	Quarter-finals	Holstein Kiel	3–0 (A)
Bayer Leverkusen	2–0 (A)	Semi-finals	SC Freiburg	2–1 (a.e.t.) (H)

== Match ==
=== Details ===
23 May 2026
20:00 CEST

Bayern Munich	3–0	VfB Stuttgart
Kane 55', 80', 90+2' (pen.)	Report

Olympiastadion, Berlin
Attendance: 74,036
Referee: Sven Jablonski (Bremen)

**Bayern Munich**	**VfB Stuttgart**

GK	40	(Germany) Jonas Urbig
RB	27	(Austria) Konrad Laimer	(substituted off) 90+4'
CB	2	(France) Dayot Upamecano
CB	4	(Germany) Jonathan Tah
LB	44	(Croatia) Josip Stanišić	(substituted off) 90+4'
CM	6	(Germany) Joshua Kimmich (c)
CM	45	(Germany) Aleksandar Pavlović	(substituted off) 90'
RW	17	(France) Michael Olise	(substituted off) 90+4'
AM	10	(Germany) Jamal Musiala	(substituted off) 76'
LW	14	(Colombia) Luis Díaz
CF	9	(England) Harry Kane
Substitutes:
GK	26	(Germany) Sven Ulreich
DF	3	(South Korea) Kim Min-jae
DF	21	(Japan) Hiroki Itō	(substituted on) 90+4'
DF	22	(Portugal) Raphaël Guerreiro	(substituted on) 90+4'
MF	8	(Germany) Leon Goretzka	(substituted on) 90'
MF	20	(Germany) Tom Bischof	(substituted on) 90+4'
MF	39	(Senegal) Bara Sapoko Ndiaye
MF	42	(Germany) Lennart Karl	(substituted on) 76'
FW	11	(Senegal) Nicolas Jackson
Manager:
(Belgium) Vincent Kompany

GK	33	(Germany) Alexander Nübel
CB	14	(Switzerland) Luca Jaquez		(substituted off) 64'
CB	24	(Germany) Jeff Chabot	(yellow card) 82'
CB	3	(Netherlands) Ramon Hendriks
RM	18	(Germany) Jamie Leweling
CM	30	(Spain) Chema Andrés		(substituted off) 84'
CM	6	(Germany) Angelo Stiller
LM	7	(Germany) Maximilian Mittelstädt
RW	26	(Germany) Deniz Undav (c)
LW	10	(Germany) Chris Führich	(yellow card) 54'	(substituted off) 78'
CF	9	(Bosnia and Herzegovina) Ermedin Demirović		(substituted off) 84'
Substitutes:
GK	1	(Germany) Fabian Bredlow
DF	4	(Germany) Josha Vagnoman
DF	22	(France) Lorenz Assignon
DF	29	(Germany) Finn Jeltsch		(substituted on) 64'
MF	11	(Morocco) Bilal El Khannouss		(substituted on) 78'
MF	16	(Turkey) Atakan Karazor
MF	28	(Denmark) Nikolas Nartey		(substituted on) 84'
FW	8	(Portugal) Tiago Tomás		(substituted on) 84'
FW	27	(Algeria) Badredine Bouanani
Manager:
(Germany) Sebastian Hoeneß

Assistant referees:
Sascha Thielert (Buchholz in der Nordheide)
Eduard Beitinger (Bad Abbach)
Fourth official:
Frank Willenborg (Osnabrück)
Reserve assistant referee:
Eric Müller (Bremen)
Video assistant referee:
Sören Storks (Velen)
Assistant video assistant referee:
Christian Fischer (Hemer)

**Match rules**

- 90 minutes
- 30 minutes of extra time if necessary
- Penalty shoot-out if scores still level
- Maximum of nine named substitutes
- Maximum of five substitutions
- Maximum of three substitution opportunities

== See also ==
- 2026 Franz Beckenbauer Supercup
- Football in Berlin
