= 2025–26 VfB Stuttgart season =

VfB Stuttgart
2025–26 season
- President: Dietmar Allgaier
- CEO: Alexander Wehrle
- Head coach: Sebastian Hoeneß
- Stadium: MHPArena
- Bundesliga: 4th
- DFB-Pokal: Runners-up
- UEFA Europa League: Round of 16
- Franz Beckenbauer Supercup: Runners-up
- Top goalscorer: League: Deniz Undav (19); All: Deniz Undav (25)
- Highest home attendance: 60,449
- Lowest home attendance: 57,000
- Average home league attendance: 59,358
- Biggest win: Go Ahead Eagles 0–4 VfB Stuttgart, Europa League, 27 November 2025; VfB Stuttgart 4–0 VfL Wolfsburg, Bundesliga, 1 March 2026; VfB Stuttgart 4–0 Hamburger SV, Bundesliga, 12 April 2026
- Biggest defeat: VfB Stuttgart 0–5 Bayern Munich, Bundesliga, 6 December 2025
| Home colours | Away colours | Third colours |

The 2025–26 season was the 133rd season in the history of VfB Stuttgart, and the club's sixth consecutive campaign in the Bundesliga. In addition to the domestic league, Stuttgart competed in the DFB-Pokal, the Franz Beckenbauer Supercup and the UEFA Europa League, having qualified for the latter two competitions by winning the 2024–25 DFB-Pokal.

On 16 August 2025, Stuttgart hosted the newly-renamed Franz Beckenbauer Supercup at the MHPArena, losing 2–1 to Bayern Munich.

== Players ==
=== First-team squad ===
As of 16 April 2026

Note: Flags indicate national team as defined under FIFA eligibility rules; some limited exceptions apply. Players may hold more than one non-FIFA nationality.

| No. | Pos. | Nation | Player |
|---|---|---|---|
| 1 | GK | GER | Fabian Bredlow |
| 2 | DF | BEL | Ameen Al-Dakhil |
| 3 | DF | NED | Ramon Hendriks |
| 4 | DF | GER | Josha Vagnoman |
| 6 | MF | GER | Angelo Stiller (4th captain) |
| 7 | DF | GER | Maximilian Mittelstädt |
| 8 | FW | POR | Tiago Tomás |
| 9 | FW | BIH | Ermedin Demirović (3rd captain) |
| 10 | MF | GER | Chris Führich |
| 11 | MF | MAR | Bilal El Khannouss |
| 14 | DF | SUI | Luca Jaquez |
| 15 | DF | GER | Pascal Stenzel |
| 16 | MF | TUR | Atakan Karazor (captain) |
| 17 | FW | GER | Justin Diehl |
| 18 | FW | GER | Jamie Leweling |
| 19 | MF | GER | Noah Darvich |

| No. | Pos. | Nation | Player |
|---|---|---|---|
| 20 | DF | SUI | Leonidas Stergiou |
| 21 | GK | GER | Stefan Drljača |
| 22 | DF | FRA | Lorenz Assignon |
| 23 | DF | FRA | Dan-Axel Zagadou |
| 24 | DF | GER | Jeff Chabot |
| 25 | FW | ECU | Jeremy Arévalo |
| 26 | FW | GER | Deniz Undav (vice-captain) |
| 27 | FW | ALG | Badredine Bouanani |
| 28 | MF | DEN | Nikolas Nartey |
| 29 | DF | GER | Finn Jeltsch |
| 30 | MF | ESP | Chema Andrés |
| 33 | GK | GER | Alexander Nübel |
| 35 | MF | GER | Mirza Catovic |
| 44 | GK | GER | Florian Hellstern |
| 45 | FW | SRB | Lazar Jovanović |
| 56 | MF | AUT | Yanik Spalt |

=== Out on loan ===
Note: Flags indicate national team as defined under FIFA eligibility rules; some limited exceptions apply. Players may hold more than one non-FIFA nationality.

| No. | Pos. | Nation | Player |
|---|---|---|---|
| — | GK | GER | Dennis Seimen (at SC Paderborn until 30 June 2026) |
| — | MF | GER | Luca Raimund (at Fortuna Düsseldorf until 30 June 2026) |
| — | MF | GER | Laurin Ulrich (at 1. FC Magdeburg until 30 June 2026) |

| No. | Pos. | Nation | Player |
|---|---|---|---|
| — | FW | GER | Jarzinho Malanga (at SV Elversberg until 30 June 2026) |
| — | MF | GER | Yannik Keitel (at FC Augsburg until 30 June 2026) |
| — | FW | SRB | Jovan Milošević (at Werder Bremen until 30 June 2026) |

== Transfers ==
=== In ===
| Pos. | Player | Transferred from | Fee | Date | Source |
|---|---|---|---|---|---|
| DF | (France) Lorenz Assignon | (France) Rennes | €12.0m | 6 June 2025 | |
| MF | (Germany) Noah Darvich | (Spain) Barcelona | €2.1m | 1 July 2025 | |
| DF | (Switzerland) Luca Jaquez | (Switzerland) Luzern | €4.7m | 3 February 2025 | |
| DF | (Germany) Finn Jeltsch | (Germany) 1. FC Nürnberg | €5.2m | 3 February 2025 | |
| FW | (Serbia) Lazar Jovanović | (Serbia) Red Star Belgrade | €2.1m | 8 July 2025 | |
| MF | (Spain) Chema Andrés | (Spain) Real Madrid | €0.81m | 27 July 2025 | |
| FW | (Portugal) Tiago Tomás | (Germany) VfL Wolfsburg | €15.0m | 17 August 2025 | |
| MF | (Algeria) Badredine Bouanani | (France) Nice | €11.0m | 31 August 2025 | |
| MF | (Morocco) Bilal El Khannouss | (England) Leicester City | Loan | 1 September 2025 | |
| FW | (Spain) Jeremy Arévalo | (Spain) Racing Santander | €1.8m | 2 January 2026 | |

=== Out ===
| Pos. | Player | Transferred to | Fee | Date | Source |
|---|---|---|---|---|---|
| ST | (Germany) Luca Pfeiffer | (Germany) SV Elversberg | €0.63m | 28 May 2025 | |
| AM | (South Korea) Woo-Yeong Jeong | (Germany) Union Berlin | €4.2m | 28 May 2025 | |
| LM | (Germany) Luca Raimund | (Germany) Fortuna Düsseldorf | €0.41m | 26 June 2025 | |
| RM | (Germany) Benjamin Boakye | (Germany) Arminia Bielefeld | €0.51m | 1 July 2025 | |
| ST | (Colombia) Juan José Perea | (Switzerland) Zürich | €1.5m | 26 July 2025 | |
| ST | (Denmark) Jacob Bruun Larsen | (England) Burnley | €5.3m | 12 July 2025 | |
| ST | (Denmark) Wahid Faghir | (Denmark) Vejle | Free transfer | 13 July 2025 | |
| CB | (Japan) Anrie Chase | (Austria) Red Bull Salzburg | €3.1m | 1 August 2025 | |
| AM | (France) Enzo Millot | (Saudi Arabia) Al-Ahli | €44.2m | 9 August 2025 | |
| ST | (Germany) Nick Woltemade | (England) Newcastle United | €37.0m | 30 August 2025 | |
| RW | (Democratic Republic of the Congo) Silas | (Germany) Mainz 05 | €3.1m | 6 January 2026 | |

== Friendlies ==
=== Pre-season ===
| 12 July 2025 Friendly | SV Fellbach | 1–7 | VfB Stuttgart | Fellbach |
| 15:00 CEST (UTC+2) | Bresic 70' | Report | Diehl 6'; Jovanović 8'; 13' (o.g.); Korkut 25'; Sankoh 73'; Penna 78', 90' | Stadium: Max Graser Stadion |

| 26 July 2025 Friendly | VfB Stuttgart | 2–1 | Celta Vigo | Reutlingen |
| 15:00 CEST (UTC+2) | Leweling 35'; Starfelt 82' (o.g.) | Report | Stenzel 116' (o.g.) | Stadium: Stadion an der Kreuzeiche |
Note: Match was played in four periods of 30 minutes each.

| 2 August 2025 Friendly | VfB Stuttgart | 6–0 | Toulouse | Kirchheim |
| 15:00 CEST (UTC+2) | Undav 11'; Führich 29'; Chabot 61'; Jovanović 101'; Demirović 107', 119' | Report | | Stadium: Sportpark Heimstetten |
Note: Match was 120 minutes long.

| 9 August 2025 Friendly | VfB Stuttgart | 0–1 | Bologna | Stuttgart |
| 17:00 CEST (UTC+2) | | Report | Vitík 32' | Stadium: MHPArena |

=== Mid-season ===
| 3 September 2025 Friendly | Sonnenhof Großaspach | 2–6 | VfB Stuttgart | Aspach |
| 18:30 CEST (UTC+2) | Maier 35'; Landwehr 81' | Report | Nartey 12'; Bouanani 15'; Keitel 34'; Führich 58', 62', 72' | Stadium: WIRmachenDRUCK Arena |

| 9 October 2025 Friendly | VfB Stuttgart | 2–0 | SV Elversberg | Aspach |
| 18:30 CEST (UTC+2) | Mittelstädt 11' (pen.); Führich 23' | Report | | Stadium: Robert-Schlienz-Stadion |

| 5 January 2026 Friendly | VfB Stuttgart | 3–2 | Luzern | Aspach |
| 14:00 CET (UTC+1) | Nartey 19'; Diehl 22'; Führich 68' | Report | Villiger 84'; Vasovic 86' | Stadium: Robert-Schlienz-Stadion |

== Competitions ==
=== Overall record ===
| Competition | First match | Last match | Starting round | Final position | Record | | | | | | | |
| Competition | First match | Last match | Starting round | Final position | Pld | W | D | L | GF | GA | GD | Win % |
|---|---|---|---|---|---|---|---|---|---|---|---|---|
| Bundesliga | 23 August 2025 | 16 May 2026 | Matchday 1 | 4th | 34 | 18 | 8 | 8 | 71 | 49 | +22 | 52.94 |
| DFB-Pokal | 26 August 2025 | 23 May 2026 | First round | Runners-up | 6 | 4 | 1 | 1 | 13 | 8 | +5 | 66.67 |
| Franz Beckenbauer Supercup | 16 August 2025 | | Final | Runners-up | 1 | 0 | 0 | 1 | 1 | 2 | −1 | 0.00 |
| UEFA Europa League | 25 September 2025 | 19 March 2026 | League phase | Round of 16 | 12 | 6 | 0 | 6 | 20 | 15 | +5 | 50.00 |
| Total | | | | | 53 | 28 | 9 | 16 | 105 | 74 | +31 | 52.83 |

Source: VfB Stuttgart

=== Bundesliga ===
==== League table ====
| Pos | Team | Pld | W | D | L | GF | GA | GD | Pts | Qualification or relegation |
|---|---|---|---|---|---|---|---|---|---|---|
| 2 | Borussia Dortmund | 34 | 22 | 7 | 5 | 70 | 34 | +36 | 73 | Qualification for the Champions League league phase |
| 3 | RB Leipzig | 34 | 20 | 5 | 9 | 66 | 47 | +19 | 65 | Qualification for the Champions League league phase |
| 4 | VfB Stuttgart | 34 | 18 | 8 | 8 | 71 | 49 | +22 | 62 | Qualification for the Champions League league phase |
| 5 | TSG Hoffenheim | 34 | 18 | 7 | 9 | 65 | 52 | +13 | 61 | Qualification for the Europa League league phase (Note: The 2025–26 DFB-Pokal winners qualified for the Europa League league phase. Since the DFB-Pokal winners, Bayern Munich, qualified for the Champions League, the Europa League spot passed to the sixth-placed team, and the Conference League spot passed to the seventh-placed team.) |
| 6 | Bayer Leverkusen | 34 | 17 | 8 | 9 | 68 | 47 | +21 | 59 | Qualification for the Europa League league phase |

Source: Bundesliga
Rules for classification: 1) Points; 2) Goal difference; 3) Goals scored; 4) Head-to-head results; 5) Head-to-head away goals scored; 6) Away goals scored; 7) Play-off.
(Rules 4–6 only apply after home and away matches have been played between the tied teams.)

==== Results summary ====
| Overall | | | | | | | | Home | | | | | | Away | | | | | |
| Pld | W | D | L | GF | GA | GD | Pts | W | D | L | GF | GA | GD | W | D | L | GF | GA | GD |
|---|---|---|---|---|---|---|---|---|---|---|---|---|---|---|---|---|---|---|---|
| 34 | 18 | 8 | 8 | 71 | 49 | +22 | 62 | 12 | 3 | 2 | 30 | 16 | +14 | 6 | 5 | 6 | 41 | 33 | +8 |

Source: Bundesliga

==== Results by round ====
| Round | 1 | 2 | 3 | 4 | 5 | 6 | 7 | 8 | 9 | 10 | 11 | 12 | 13 | 14 | 15 | 16 | 17 | 18 | 19 | 20 | 21 | 22 | 23 | 24 | 25 | 26 | 27 | 28 | 29 | 30 | 31 | 32 | 33 | 34 |
|---|---|---|---|---|---|---|---|---|---|---|---|---|---|---|---|---|---|---|---|---|---|---|---|---|---|---|---|---|---|---|---|---|---|---|
| Ground | A | H | A | H | A | H | A | H | A | H | A | A | H | A | H | A | H | H | A | H | A | H | A | H | A | H | A | H | H | A | H | A | H | A |
| Result | L | W | L | W | W | W | W | W | L | W | D | L | L | W | D | W | W | D | W | W | L | W | D | W | D | W | W | L | W | L | D | D | W | D |
| Position | 12 | 8 | 12 | 8 | 5 | 4 | 3 | 3 | 4 | 4 | 5 | 6 | 6 | 6 | 6 | 5 | 4 | 4 | 4 | 4 | 5 | 4 | 4 | 4 | 4 | 4 | 3 | 4 | 3 | 4 | 4 | 5 | 4 | 4 |
| Points | 0 | 3 | 3 | 6 | 9 | 12 | 15 | 18 | 18 | 21 | 22 | 22 | 22 | 25 | 26 | 29 | 32 | 33 | 36 | 39 | 39 | 42 | 43 | 46 | 47 | 50 | 53 | 53 | 56 | 56 | 57 | 58 | 61 | 62 |

Source: Bundesliga
A = Away; H = Home; W = Win; D = Draw; L = Loss

==== Matches ====
| 23 August 2025 1 | Union Berlin | 2–1 | VfB Stuttgart | Berlin |
| 15:30 CEST (UTC+2) | Ansah 18', 45+4'; Trimmel (yellow card) 26'; Haberer (yellow card) 50'; Khedira (yellow card) 58'; Ilić (yellow card) 82' | Report | Undav (yellow card) 33'; Demirović (yellow card) 36'; Vagnoman (yellow card) 52'; Leweling (yellow card) 83'; Tomás 86' | Stadium: Stadion An der Alten Försterei; Attendance: 22,012; Referee: Robert Hartmann |

| 30 August 2025 2 | VfB Stuttgart | 1–0 | Borussia Mönchengladbach | Stuttgart |
| 15:30 CEST (UTC+2) | Mittelstädt (yellow card) 24'; Leweling (yellow card) 54'; Andrés 79' | Report | Scally (yellow card) 75' | Stadium: MHPArena; Attendance: 60,000; Referee: Sven Jablonski |

| 13 September 2025 3 | SC Freiburg | 3–1 | VfB Stuttgart | Freiburg |
| 15:30 CEST (UTC+2) | Matanović 81', 90+2' (pen.); Scherhant 86'; Manzambi (red card) 90+8'; Schuster (yellow card) 90+9' | Report | Demirović 20'; El Khannouss (yellow card) 90+3' | Stadium: Europa-Park Stadion; Attendance: 34,700; Referee: Daniel Siebert |

| 19 September 2025 4 | VfB Stuttgart | 2–0 | FC St. Pauli | Stuttgart |
| 20:30 CEST (UTC+2) | Stiller (penalty missed) 24'; Demirović 43'; El Khannouss 50' | Report | Sands (yellow card) 40'; Afolayan (yellow card) 67' | Stadium: MHPArena; Attendance: 60,000; Referee: Sascha Stegemann |

| 28 September 2025 5 | 1. FC Köln | 1–2 | VfB Stuttgart | Cologne |
| 17:30 CEST (UTC+2) | Kaminski 4'; Schmied (yellow card) 66'; Krauß (yellow card) 76' | Report | Demirović 28' (pen.); Jaquez (yellow card) 78'; Vagnoman 81'; Bouanani (yellow card) 90+1' | Stadium: RheinEnergieStadion; Attendance: 50,000; Referee: Matthias Jöllenbeck |

| 5 October 2025 6 | VfB Stuttgart | 1–0 | 1. FC Heidenheim | Stuttgart |
| 15:30 CEST (UTC+2) | El Khannouss (yellow card) 55', (goal) 65' | Report | Kerber (yellow card) 64' | Stadium: MHPArena; Attendance: 60,000; Referee: Tobias Stieler |

| 18 October 2025 7 | VfL Wolfsburg | 0–3 | VfB Stuttgart | Wolfsburg |
| 15:30 CEST (UTC+2) | Jenz (yellow card) 20' | Report | Mittelstädt (yellow card) 6', (goal) 55'; Tomás 35'; Stiller 80' | Stadium: Volkswagen Arena; Attendance: 26,145; Referee: Florian Badstübner |

| 26 October 2025 8 | VfB Stuttgart | 2–1 | Mainz 05 | Stuttgart |
| 17:30 CET (UTC+1) | Stenzel (yellow card) 45+1'; Führich 45+4'; Jeltsch (yellow card) 66'; Assignon (yellow card) 77'; Undav 80'; Tomás (yellow card) 90+8' | Report | Amiri 41' (pen.), (yellow card) 90+8'; Mwene (yellow card) 59'; Kohr (yellow card) 63' | Stadium: MHPArena; Attendance: 59,000; Referee: Felix Zwayer |

| 1 November 2025 9 | RB Leipzig | 3–1 | VfB Stuttgart | Leipzig |
| 15:30 CET (UTC+1) | Baumgartner (yellow card) 38'; Chabot 45' (o.g.); Diomande 53'; Rômulo 90+1' | Report | Undav (yellow card) 57'; Tomás 65'; Hendriks (yellow card) 84' | Stadium: Red Bull Arena; Attendance: 47,800; Referee: Sven Jablonski |

| 9 November 2025 10 | VfB Stuttgart | 3–2 | FC Augsburg | Stuttgart |
| 17:30 CET (UTC+1) | Mittelstädt 18' (pen.); Undav 39', 80'; Assignon (yellow card) 68'; Nartey (yellow card) 85' | Report | Rieder 8'; Schlotterbeck (yellow card) 17'; Massengo 26'; Matsima (yellow card) 50'; Giannoulis (yellow card) 74' | Stadium: MHPArena; Attendance: 58,500; Referee: Harm Osmers |

| 22 November 2025 11 | Borussia Dortmund | 3–3 | VfB Stuttgart | Dortmund |
| 15:30 CET (UTC+1) | Can 34' (pen.); Beier 41', (yellow card) 81'; Adeyemi 89' | Report | Jeltsch (yellow card) 24'; Undav 47', 71', 90+1' | Stadium: Signal Iduna Park; Attendance: 81,365; Referee: Benjamin Brand |

| 30 November 2025 12 | Hamburger SV | 2–1 | VfB Stuttgart | Hamburg |
| 15:30 CET (UTC+1) | Glatzel 17'; Røssing-Lelesiit (yellow card) 65' (yellow-red card) 81'; Vieira 90+4' | Report | Stenzel (yellow card) 23'; Undav 54', (yellow card) 81'; Andrés (yellow card) 74'; Vagnoman (yellow card) 87' | Stadium: Volksparkstadion; Attendance: 57,000; Referee: Sören Storks |

| 6 December 2025 13 | VfB Stuttgart | 0–5 | Bayern Munich | Stuttgart |
| 15:30 CET (UTC+1) | Al-Dakhil (yellow card) 2'; Leweling (yellow card) 4'; Assignon (red card) 81' | Report | Laimer 11'; Bischof (yellow card) 39'; Upamecano (yellow card) 44'; Goretzka (yellow card) 58'; Díaz (yellow card) 62'; Kane 66', 82' (pen.), 88'; Stanišić 78' | Stadium: MHPArena; Attendance: 60,000; Referee: Tobias Stieler |

| 14 December 2025 14 | Werder Bremen | 0–4 | VfB Stuttgart | Bremen |
| 19:30 CET (UTC+1) | Coulibaly (yellow card) 11' (yellow-red card) 59' | Report | El Khannouss 40'; Leweling 44'; Undav 79'; Führich 90+7' | Stadium: Weserstadion; Attendance: 42,100; Referee: Robert Hartmann |

| 20 December 2025 15 | VfB Stuttgart | 0–0 | TSG Hoffenheim | Stuttgart |
| 15:30 CET (UTC+1) | Stiller (yellow card) 32'; Karazor (yellow card) 48'; Tomás (yellow card) 68' | Report | Hranáč (yellow card) 60'; Hajdari (yellow card) 66' | Stadium: MHPArena; Attendance: 59,000; Referee: Daniel Siebert |

| 10 January 2026 16 | Bayer Leverkusen | 1–4 | VfB Stuttgart | Leverkusen |
| 18:30 CET (UTC+1) | Flekken (yellow card) 38'; Grimaldo 66' (pen.), (yellow card) 79'; Badé (yellow card) 70'; García (yellow card) 80' | Report | Leweling 7', 45', (yellow card) 38'; Mittelstädt 29' (pen.); Undav 45+2'; Jeltsch (yellow card) 77' | Stadium: BayArena; Attendance: 30,210; Referee: Daniel Schlager |

| 13 January 2026 17 | VfB Stuttgart | 3–2 | Eintracht Frankfurt | Stuttgart |
| 18:30 CET (UTC+1) | Demirović 27'; Undav 35'; Chabot (yellow card) 56'; Nartey 87'; Hendriks (yellow card) 90+4' | Report | Kristensen 5'; Kalimuendo (yellow card) 9'; Amaimouni 80'; Theate (yellow card) 90+6' | Stadium: MHPArena; Attendance: 59,500; Referee: Matthias Jöllenbeck |

| 18 January 2026 18 | VfB Stuttgart | 1–1 | Union Berlin | Stuttgart |
| 15:30 CET (UTC+1) | Vagnoman (yellow card) 41'; Führich 59' | Report | Burcu (yellow card) 1'; Jeong 83' | Stadium: MHPArena; Attendance: 59,500; Referee: Deniz Aytekin |

| 25 January 2026 19 | Borussia Mönchengladbach | 0–3 | VfB Stuttgart | Mönchengladbach |
| 15:30 CET (UTC+1) | Tabaković (penalty missed) 13'; Ullrich (yellow card) 85' | Report | Leweling 30'; Karazor (yellow card) 43'; Scally 67' (o.g.); Undav 74' | Stadium: Borussia-Park; Attendance: 48,844; Referee: Sören Storks |

| 1 February 2026 20 | VfB Stuttgart | 1–0 | SC Freiburg | Stuttgart |
| 15:30 CET (UTC+1) | Karazor (yellow card) 52'; Demirović 89', (yellow card) 90+3'; Mittelstädt (yellow card) 90+5' | Report | Beste (yellow card) 53'; Schuster (yellow card) 90+5' | Stadium: MHPArena; Attendance: 60,000; Referee: Florian Badstübner |

| 7 February 2026 21 | FC St. Pauli | 2–1 | VfB Stuttgart | Hamburg |
| 15:30 CET (UTC+1) | Saliakas 35'; Sinani 55' (pen.) | Report | Undav (yellow card) 58'; Demirović (yellow card) 72'; Leweling 90' | Stadium: Millerntor-Stadion; Attendance: 29,546; Referee: Benjamin Brand |

| 14 February 2026 22 | VfB Stuttgart | 3–1 | 1. FC Köln | Stuttgart |
| 18:30 CET (UTC+1) | Demirović 15', 84', (yellow card) 60'; Führich (yellow card) 29'; Chabot (yellow card) 53'; El Khannouss (yellow card) 76'; Undav 90+2' | Report | Ache 79'; Kamiński (yellow card) 90+5' | Stadium: MHPArena; Attendance: 60,000; Referee: Robert Hartmann |

| 22 February 2026 23 | 1. FC Heidenheim | 3–3 | VfB Stuttgart | Heidenheim |
| 19:30 CET (UTC+1) | Dinkçi 20'; Ibrahimović 35' (pen.); Siersleben (yellow card) 73'; Conteh 82' | Report | Führich 5'; Mittelstädt 45' (pen.); Undav 88'; El Khannouss (yellow card) 90+2'; Andrés (yellow card) 90+2' | Stadium: Voith-Arena; Attendance: 15,000; Referee: Sascha Stegemann |

| 1 March 2026 24 | VfB Stuttgart | 4–0 | VfL Wolfsburg | Stuttgart |
| 15:30 CET (UTC+1) | Undav 21'; Leweling 30', 42'; El Khannouss (yellow card) 88'; Nartey 90+5' | Report | Bauer (yellow card) 19' | Stadium: MHPArena; Attendance: 60,449; Referee: Patrick Ittrich |

| 7 March 2026 25 | Mainz 05 | 2–2 | VfB Stuttgart | Mainz |
| 15:30 CET (UTC+1) | Lee 39'; Da Costa 90+1' | Report | Demirović 76'; Undav 76'; Tomás (yellow card) 82'; Chabot (yellow card) 90+5' | Stadium: Mewa Arena; Attendance: 33,305; Referee: Matthias Jöllenbeck |

| 15 March 2026 26 | VfB Stuttgart | 1–0 | RB Leipzig | Stuttgart |
| 19:30 CET (UTC+1) | Undav 56'; Karazor (yellow card) 68' | Report | Rômulo (yellow card) 39'; Schlager (yellow card) 83' | Stadium: MHPArena; Attendance: 57,500; Referee: Deniz Aytekin |

| 22 March 2026 27 | FC Augsburg | 2–5 | VfB Stuttgart | Augsburg |
| 19:30 CET (UTC+1) | Rieder 57'; Kade 72'; Giannoulis (yellow card) 79' | Report | Undav 12', 58'; Tomás 29'; Nartey 31', (yellow card) 63'; Andrés (yellow card) 68'; Assignon (yellow card) 78'; Demirović 83' | Stadium: WWK Arena; Attendance: 30,660; Referee: Felix Zwayer |

| 4 April 2026 28 | VfB Stuttgart | 0–2 | Borussia Dortmund | Stuttgart |
| 18:30 CEST (UTC+2) | Hendriks (yellow card) 65'; Karazor (yellow card) 90+7' | Report | Chukwuemeka (yellow card) 29'; Sabitzer (yellow card) 71'; Adeyemi (yellow card) 80', (goal) 90+4'; Brandt 90+6'; Ryerson (yellow card) 90+7' | Stadium: MHPArena; Attendance: 60,000; Referee: Robert Schröder |

| 12 April 2026 29 | VfB Stuttgart | 4–0 | Hamburger SV | Stuttgart |
| 17:30 CEST (UTC+2) | Stiller 21'; Andrés (yellow card) 24'; Führich 32'; Mittelstädt 56'; Undav (yellow card) 80', (penalty missed) 82'; El Khannouss 86' | Report | Capaldo (yellow card) 80' | Stadium: MHPArena; Attendance: 60,000; Referee: Sven Jablonski |

| 19 April 2026 30 | Bayern Munich | 4–2 | VfB Stuttgart | Munich |
| 17:30 CEST (UTC+2) | Guerreiro 31'; Jackson 33'; Davies 37'; Kane 52' | Report | Führich 21'; Andrés 88' | Stadium: Allianz Arena; Attendance: 75,000; Referee: Sören Storks |

| 26 April 2026 31 | VfB Stuttgart | 1–1 | Werder Bremen | Stuttgart |
| 15:30 CEST (UTC+2) | Demirović 61' | Report | Stage 18'; Backhaus (yellow card) 78' | Stadium: MHPArena; Attendance: 60,000; Referee: Christian Dingert |

| 2 May 2026 32 | TSG Hoffenheim | 3–3 | VfB Stuttgart | Sinsheim |
| 15:30 CEST (UTC+2) | Kramarić 7', 49', (yellow card) 49'; Touré 24'; Bernardo (yellow card) 68'; Kabak (yellow card) 83' | Report | Führich 20'; El Khannouss (yellow card) 58'; Demirović 64'; Karazor (red card) 69'; Tomás 90+5' | Stadium: PreZero Arena; Attendance: 30,150; Referee: Sascha Stegemann |

| 9 May 2026 33 | VfB Stuttgart | 3–1 | Bayer Leverkusen | Stuttgart |
| 15:30 CEST (UTC+2) | Demirović 5'; Mittelstädt 45+7' (pen.); Undav 58'; Führich (yellow card) 80'; Tomás (yellow card) 90+7' | Report | García 1'; Palacios (yellow card) 90+7' | Stadium: MHPArena; Attendance: 60,000; Referee: Robert Schröder |

| 16 May 2026 34 | Eintracht Frankfurt | 2–2 | VfB Stuttgart | Frankfurt |
| 15:30 CEST (UTC+2) | Chaïbi (yellow card) 47'; Amenda (yellow card) 60'; Burkardt 72' (pen.), 90+2' (pen.) | Report | Andrés 10', (yellow card) 27'; Nartey 45+4'; Mittelstädt (yellow card) 63'; Demirović (yellow card) 66' | Stadium: Deutsche Bank Park; Attendance: 59,400; Referee: Tobias Welz |

=== DFB-Pokal ===
| 26 August 2025 First round | Eintracht Braunschweig | 4–4 (a.e.t.) (7–8 p) | VfB Stuttgart | Braunschweig |
| 20:45 CEST (UTC+2) | Köhler 8', (yellow card) 25'; Di Michele Sanchez 77', 85'; Conteh 104', (yellow card) 117'; Marie (yellow card) 105+1' | Report | Demirović 11', 60'; Hendriks (yellow card) 32'; Karazor (yellow card) 41'; Woltemade 89'; Jeltsch (yellow card) 90+8'; Ba 92' (o.g.); Assignon (yellow card) 117'; Leweling (yellow card) 120+2' | Stadium: Eintracht-Stadion; Attendance: 20,865; Referee: Florian Exner |
| | Penalties |
| | Szabó (penalty scored); Gómez (penalty missed); Marie (penalty missed); Aydın (penalty scored); Polter (penalty scored); Bell Bell (penalty scored); Ba (penalty scored); Ehlers (penalty scored); Conteh (penalty scored); Frenkert (penalty missed) | | (penalty scored) Woltemade; (penalty scored) Mittelstädt; (penalty missed) Andrés; (penalty missed) Zagadou; (penalty scored) Leweling; (penalty scored) Demirović; (penalty scored) Hendriks; (penalty scored) Vagnoman; (penalty scored) Karazor; (penalty scored) Assignon |

| 29 October 2025 Second round | Mainz 05 | 0–2 | VfB Stuttgart | Mainz |
| 18:00 CET (UTC+1) | Hanche-Olsen (yellow card) 1'; Kohr (yellow card) 39'; Zentner (yellow card) 73'; Veratschnig (yellow card) 75'; Amiri (yellow card) 86' | Report | Jaquez 6'; Undav (yellow card) 61'; Karazor 73'; Assignon (yellow card) 83'; Führich (yellow card) 86' | Stadium: Mewa Arena; Attendance: 29,400; Referee: Deniz Aytekin |

| 3 December 2025 Round of 16 | VfL Bochum | 0–2 | VfB Stuttgart | Bochum |
| 18:00 CET (UTC+1) | Strompf (red card) 45+1' | Report | Strompf 12' (o.g.); Undav 47' | Stadium: Vonovia Ruhrstadion; Attendance: 25,940; Referee: Florian Badstübner |

| 4 February 2026 Quarter-finals | Holstein Kiel | 0–3 | VfB Stuttgart | Kiel |
| 20:45 CET (UTC+1) | | Report | El Khannouss (yellow card) 42'; Undav 56'; Führich 89'; Karazor 90+2' | Stadium: Holstein-Stadion; Attendance: 15,034; Referee: Tobias Welz |

| 23 April 2026 Semi-finals | VfB Stuttgart | 2–1 (a.e.t.) | SC Freiburg | Stuttgart |
| 20:45 CEST (UTC+2) | Nartey (yellow card) 15'; Leweling (yellow card) 17'; Undav 70'; Hendriks (yellow card) 95'; Tomás 119', (yellow card) 120+1' | Report | Makengo (yellow card) 13'; Manzambi (yellow card) 17'; Eggestein 28'; Grifo (yellow card) 56'; Matanović (yellow card) 74'; Höler (yellow card) 94' | Stadium: MHPArena; Attendance: 60,000; Referee: Tobias Welz |

| 23 May 2026 Final | Bayern Munich | 3–0 | VfB Stuttgart | Berlin |
| 20:00 CEST (UTC+2) | Kane 55', 80', 90+2' (pen.) | Report | Führich (yellow card) 54'; Chabot (yellow card) 82' | Stadium: Olympiastadion; Attendance: 74,036; Referee: Sven Jablonski |

=== Franz Beckenbauer Supercup ===
| 16 August 2025 Final | VfB Stuttgart | 1–2 | Bayern Munich | Stuttgart |
| 20:30 CEST (UTC+2) | Mittelstädt (yellow card) 44'; Leweling 90+3' | Report | Kane 18', (yellow card) 57'; Upamecano (yellow card) 35'; Olise (yellow card) 45'; Díaz 77' | Stadium: MHPArena; Attendance: 60,000; Referee: Harm Osmers |

=== UEFA Europa League ===
Stuttgart qualified for the league phase as 2024–25 DFB-Pokal winners.

==== League phase ====
The draw for the league phase was held on 29 August 2025.

| Pos | Team | Pld | W | D | L | GF | GA | GD | Pts | Qualification |
|---|---|---|---|---|---|---|---|---|---|---|
| 9 | (Royal Belgian Football Association) Genk | 8 | 5 | 1 | 2 | 11 | 7 | +4 | 16 | Advance to knockout phase play-offs (seeded) |
| 10 | (Italian Football Federation) Bologna | 8 | 4 | 3 | 1 | 14 | 7 | +7 | 15 | Advance to knockout phase play-offs (seeded) |
| 11 | (German Football Association) VfB Stuttgart | 8 | 5 | 0 | 3 | 15 | 9 | +6 | 15 | Advance to knockout phase play-offs (seeded) |
| 12 | (Hungarian Football Federation) Ferencváros | 8 | 4 | 3 | 1 | 12 | 11 | +1 | 15 | Advance to knockout phase play-offs (seeded) |
| 13 | (The Football Association) Nottingham Forest | 8 | 4 | 2 | 2 | 15 | 7 | +8 | 14 | Advance to knockout phase play-offs (seeded) |

Source: UEFA
Rules for classification: League phase tiebreakers

| Round | 1 | 2 | 3 | 4 | 5 | 6 | 7 | 8 |
|---|---|---|---|---|---|---|---|---|
| Ground | H | A | A | H | A | H | A | H |
| Result | W | L | L | W | W | W | L | W |
| Position | 6 | 23 | 29 | 20 | 12 | 9 | 13 | 11 |
| Points | 3 | 3 | 3 | 6 | 9 | 12 | 12 | 15 |

Source: UEFA
A = Away; H = Home; W = Win; D = Draw; L = Loss

| 25 September 2025 1 | VfB Stuttgart (Germany) | 2–1 | (Spain) Celta Vigo | Stuttgart, Germany |
| 21:00 CEST (UTC+2) | Demirović (yellow card) 35'; Bouanani 51'; El Khannouss 68'; Assignon (yellow card) 85' | Report | Swedberg (yellow card) 63'; Iglesias 86'; Moriba (yellow card) 90+5' | Stadium: MHP Arena; Attendance: 58,000; Referee: Nick Walsh (Scotland) |

| 2 October 2025 2 | Basel (Switzerland) | 2–0 | (Germany) VfB Stuttgart | Basel, Switzerland |
| 21:00 CEST (UTC+2) | Ajeti 3', (yellow card) 30'; Schmid (yellow card) 69'; Salah (yellow card) 78'; Shaqiri 84' | Report | | Stadium: St. Jakob-Park; Attendance: 33,650; Referee: Davide Massa (Italy) |

| 23 October 2025 3 | Fenerbahçe (Turkey) | 1–0 | (Germany) VfB Stuttgart | Istanbul, Turkey |
| 19:45 TRT (UTC+3) | Álvarez (yellow card) 27'; Aktürkoğlu 34' (pen.); Semedo (yellow card) 45+4'; Oosterwolde (yellow card) 82'; Škriniar (yellow card) 85'; Durán (yellow card) 89'; Yüksek (yellow card) 90+8'; Aydın (yellow card) 90+9' | Report | El Khannouss (yellow card) 21'; Stiller (yellow card) 32'; Undav (yellow card) 90+8'; Chabot (yellow card) 90+8' | Stadium: Şükrü Saracoğlu Stadium; Attendance: 38,891; Referee: Jakob Kehlet (Denmark) |

| 6 November 2025 4 | VfB Stuttgart (Germany) | 2–0 | (Netherlands) Feyenoord | Stuttgart, Germany |
| 21:00 CET (UTC+1) | Chabot (yellow card) 23'; Mittelstädt (yellow card) 45+2'; El Khannouss 84'; Andrés (yellow card) 89'; Undav 90+1' | Report | Hadj Moussa (yellow card) 32'; Read (yellow card) 57'; Timber (yellow card) 64'; Smal (yellow card) 68' | Stadium: MHPArena; Attendance: 60,000; Referee: Horațiu Feșnic (Romania) |

| 27 November 2025 5 | Go Ahead Eagles (Netherlands) | 0–4 | (Germany) VfB Stuttgart | Deventer, Netherlands |
| 21:00 CET (UTC+1) | James (yellow card) 37'; Edvardsen (yellow card) 74'; Adelgaard (yellow card) 83' | Report | Leweling 20', 35'; El Khannouss 59'; Stiller (yellow card) 74'; Undav (yellow card) 75'; Bouanani (yellow card) 85', (goal) 90+3'; Chabot (yellow card) 90' | Stadium: De Adelaarshorst; Attendance: 9,448; Referee: Mohammed Al-Hakim (Sweden) |

| 11 December 2025 6 | VfB Stuttgart (Germany) | 4–1 | (Israel) Maccabi Tel Aviv | Stuttgart, Germany |
| 18:45 CET (UTC+1) | Assignon 24'; Jovanović (yellow card) 30'; Tomás 37'; Mittelstädt 50' (pen.); El Khannouss (yellow card) 65'; Vagnoman 90+4' | Report | Revivo 52'; Camara (yellow card) 54'; Ben Hamo (yellow card) 82' | Stadium: MHPArena; Attendance: 57,000; Referee: Marian Barbu (Romania) |

| 22 January 2026 7 | Roma (Italy) | 2–0 | (Germany) VfB Stuttgart | Rome, Italy |
| 21:00 CET (UTC+1) | Pisilli 40', 90+3'; Çelik (yellow card) 87' | Report | Mittelstädt (yellow card) 18'; Chabot (yellow card) 85' | Stadium: Stadio Olimpico; Attendance: 65,183; Referee: John Brooks (England) |

| 29 January 2026 8 | VfB Stuttgart (Germany) | 3–2 | (Switzerland) Young Boys | Stuttgart, Germany |
| 21:00 CET (UTC+1) | Undav 6'; Demirović 7'; Andrés 90'; Karazor (yellow card) 90+5' | Report | Monteiro (yellow card) 41'; Gigović 42'; Lauper 57' | Stadium: MHPArena; Attendance: 57,000; Referee: Javier Alberola Rojas (Spain) |

==== Knockout phase ====
===== Knockout phase play-offs =====
The draw for the knockout phase play-offs was held on 30 January 2026.

| 19 February 2026 First leg | Celtic (Scotland) | 1–4 | (Germany) VfB Stuttgart | Glasgow, Scotland |
| 20:00 GMT (UTC+0) | Nygren 21' | Report | El Khannouss 15', 28'; Chabot (yellow card) 50'; Leweling 57'; Tomás 90+3' | Stadium: Celtic Park; Attendance: 52,901; Referee: Erik Lambrechts (Belgium) |

| 26 February 2026 Second leg | VfB Stuttgart (Germany) | 0–1 (4–2 agg.) | (Scotland) Celtic | Stuttgart, Germany |
| 18:45 CET (UTC+1) | | Report | McCowan 1'; Donovan (yellow card) 45' | Stadium: MHPArena; Attendance: 58,500; Referee: Irfan Peljto (Bosnia and Herzegovina) |

===== Round of 16 =====
The draw for the round of 16 was held on 27 February 2026.

| 12 March 2026 First leg | VfB Stuttgart (Germany) | 1–2 | (Portugal) Porto | Stuttgart, Germany |
| 18:45 CET (UTC+1) | Undav 40'; Jeltsch (yellow card) 48'; El Khannouss (yellow card) 90+3' | Report | Moffi 21'; Mora 27'; William Gomes (yellow card) 45+2'; Thiago Silva (yellow card) 65'; Varela (yellow card) 86'; Sanusi (yellow card) 90+4' | Stadium: MHPArena; Attendance: 60,000; Referee: Donatas Rumšas (Lithuania) |

| 19 March 2026 Second leg | Porto (Portugal) | 2–0 (4–1 agg.) | (Germany) VfB Stuttgart | Porto, Portugal |
| 20:00 WET (UTC+0) | Rosario (yellow card) 7'; William Gomes 21'; Sanusi (yellow card) 23'; Mora (yellow card) 25'; Froholdt 72' | Report | Demirović (yellow card) 35'; Jaquez (yellow card) 63'; Nartey (yellow card) 76' (yellow-red card) 77'; Assignon (yellow card) 89' | Stadium: Estádio do Dragão; Attendance: 40,675; Referee: Anthony Taylor (England) |

== Statistics ==
=== Appearances and goals ===
| No. | Pos | Nat | Player | Total | | Bundesliga | | DFB-Pokal | | Franz Beckenbauer Supercup | | Europa League | |
| No. | Pos | Nat | Player | Apps | Goals | Apps | Goals | Apps | Goals | Apps | Goals | Apps | Goals |
Goalkeepers
| 1 | GK | (Germany) GER | Fabian Bredlow | 4 | 0 | 0 | 0 | 2 | 0 | 1 | 0 | 1 | 0 |
| 21 | GK | (Germany) GER | Stefan Drljača | 0 | 0 | 0 | 0 | 0 | 0 | 0 | 0 | 0 | 0 |
| 33 | GK | (Germany) GER | Alexander Nübel | 49 | 0 | 34 | 0 | 4 | 0 | 0 | 0 | 11 | 0 |
Defenders
| 2 | DF | (Belgium) BEL | Ameen Al-Dakhil | 8 | 0 | 3+5 | 0 | 0 | 0 | 0 | 0 | 0 | 0 |
| 3 | DF | (Netherlands) NED | Ramon Hendriks | 50 | 0 | 22+9 | 0 | 6 | 0 | 0+1 | 0 | 9+3 | 0 |
| 4 | DF | (Germany) GER | Josha Vagnoman | 40 | 2 | 18+9 | 1 | 1+3 | 0 | 1 | 0 | 3+5 | 1 |
| 7 | DF | (Germany) GER | Maximilian Mittelstädt | 50 | 7 | 24+8 | 6 | 6 | 0 | 1 | 0 | 10+1 | 1 |
| 14 | DF | (Switzerland) SUI | Luca Jaquez | 26 | 1 | 10+4 | 0 | 2+1 | 1 | 1 | 0 | 4+4 | 0 |
| 15 | DF | (Germany) GER | Pascal Stenzel | 2 | 0 | 2 | 0 | 0 | 0 | 0 | 0 | 0 | 0 |
| 20 | DF | (Switzerland) SUI | Leonidas Stergiou | 2 | 0 | 0+1 | 0 | 0+1 | 0 | 0 | 0 | 0 | 0 |
| 22 | DF | (France) FRA | Lorenz Assignon | 37 | 1 | 12+12 | 0 | 3 | 0 | 0+1 | 0 | 8+1 | 1 |
| 23 | DF | (France) FRA | Dan-Axel Zagadou | 5 | 0 | 3 | 0 | 0+1 | 0 | 0 | 0 | 0+1 | 0 |
| 24 | DF | (Germany) GER | Jeff Chabot | 41 | 0 | 26+1 | 0 | 5 | 0 | 1 | 0 | 8 | 0 |
| 29 | DF | (Germany) GER | Finn Jeltsch | 37 | 0 | 17+6 | 0 | 2+2 | 0 | 0 | 0 | 9+1 | 0 |
Midfielders
| 6 | MF | (Germany) GER | Angelo Stiller | 52 | 2 | 30+4 | 2 | 6 | 0 | 1 | 0 | 10+1 | 0 |
| 11 | MF | (Morocco) MAR | Bilal El Khannouss | 41 | 9 | 19+6 | 4 | 3+2 | 0 | 0 | 0 | 7+4 | 5 |
| 16 | MF | (Turkey) TUR | Atakan Karazor | 44 | 2 | 22+6 | 0 | 5 | 2 | 1 | 0 | 8+2 | 0 |
| 19 | MF | (Germany) GER | Noah Darvich | 0 | 0 | 0 | 0 | 0 | 0 | 0 | 0 | 0 | 0 |
| 27 | MF | (Algeria) ALG | Badredine Bouanani | 28 | 2 | 5+9 | 0 | 1+3 | 0 | 0 | 0 | 5+5 | 2 |
| 28 | MF | (Denmark) DEN | Nikolas Nartey | 38 | 4 | 14+14 | 4 | 1+3 | 0 | 0+1 | 0 | 1+4 | 0 |
| 30 | MF | (Spain) ESP | Chema Andrés | 39 | 4 | 14+11 | 3 | 1+3 | 0 | 0+1 | 0 | 6+3 | 1 |
| 45 | MF | (Serbia) SRB | Lazar Jovanović | 6 | 0 | 0+3 | 0 | 0 | 0 | 0 | 0 | 1+2 | 0 |
| 56 | MF | (Austria) AUT | Yanik Spalt | 1 | 0 | 0 | 0 | 0 | 0 | 0 | 0 | 0+1 | 0 |
Forwards
| 8 | FW | (Portugal) POR | Tiago Tomás | 39 | 8 | 10+17 | 5 | 1+2 | 1 | 0 | 0 | 5+4 | 2 |
| 9 | FW | (Bosnia and Herzegovina) BIH | Ermedin Demirović | 38 | 15 | 17+8 | 12 | 3+1 | 2 | 0+1 | 0 | 6+2 | 1 |
| 10 | FW | (Germany) GER | Chris Führich | 52 | 8 | 20+13 | 7 | 4+2 | 1 | 1 | 0 | 4+8 | 0 |
| 17 | FW | (Germany) GER | Justin Diehl | 0 | 0 | 0 | 0 | 0 | 0 | 0 | 0 | 0 | 0 |
| 18 | FW | (Germany) GER | Jamie Leweling | 50 | 11 | 26+6 | 7 | 4+2 | 0 | 1 | 1 | 7+4 | 3 |
| 25 | FW | (Ecuador) ECU | Jeremy Arévalo | 7 | 0 | 0+7 | 0 | 0 | 0 | 0 | 0 | 0 | 0 |
| 26 | FW | (Germany) GER | Deniz Undav | 46 | 25 | 25+4 | 19 | 6 | 3 | 1 | 0 | 9+1 | 3 |
Players transferred/loaned out during the season
| 11 | FW | (Germany) GER | Nick Woltemade | 3 | 1 | 1 | 0 | 1 | 1 | 1 | 0 | 0 | 0 |

Source: Competitions

=== Goalscorers ===
| Rank | Pos. | No. | Nat. | Player | Bundesliga | DFB-Pokal | Franz Beckenbauer Supercup | Europa League | Total |
|---|---|---|---|---|---|---|---|---|---|
| 1 | FW | 26 | (Germany) | Deniz Undav | 19 | 3 | 0 | 3 | 25 |
| 2 | FW | 9 | (Bosnia and Herzegovina) | Ermedin Demirović | 12 | 2 | 0 | 1 | 15 |
| 3 | FW | 18 | (Germany) | Jamie Leweling | 7 | 0 | 1 | 3 | 11 |
| 4 | MF | 11 | (Morocco) | Bilal El Khannouss | 4 | 0 | 0 | 5 | 9 |
| 5 | FW | 8 | (Portugal) | Tiago Tomás | 5 | 1 | 0 | 2 | 8 |
| 5 | FW | 10 | (Germany) | Chris Führich | 7 | 1 | 0 | 0 | 8 |
| 7 | DF | 7 | (Germany) | Maximilian Mittelstädt | 6 | 0 | 0 | 1 | 7 |
| 8 | MF | 28 | (Denmark) | Nikolas Nartey | 4 | 0 | 0 | 0 | 4 |
| 8 | MF | 30 | (Spain) | Chema Andrés | 3 | 0 | 0 | 1 | 4 |
| 10 | DF | 4 | (Germany) | Josha Vagnoman | 1 | 0 | 0 | 1 | 2 |
| 10 | MF | 6 | (Germany) | Angelo Stiller | 2 | 0 | 0 | 0 | 2 |
| 10 | MF | 16 | (Turkey) | Atakan Karazor | 0 | 2 | 0 | 0 | 2 |
| 10 | MF | 27 | (Algeria) | Badredine Bouanani | 0 | 0 | 0 | 2 | 2 |
| 14 | FW | 11 | (Germany) | Nick Woltemade | 0 | 1 | 0 | 0 | 1 |
| 14 | DF | 14 | (Switzerland) | Luca Jaquez | 0 | 1 | 0 | 0 | 1 |
| 14 | DF | 22 | (France) | Lorenz Assignon | 0 | 0 | 0 | 1 | 1 |
| Own goals | | | | | 1 | 2 | 0 | 0 | 3 |
| Totals | | | | | 71 | 13 | 1 | 20 | 105 |

=== Assists ===
The list is sorted by squad number when total assists are equal.

| Rank | No. | Pos. | Nat. | Player | Bundesliga | DFB-Pokal | Franz Beckenbauer Supercup | Europa League | Total |
|---|---|---|---|---|---|---|---|---|---|
| 1 | 26 | FW | (Germany) | Deniz Undav | 6 | 2 | 0 | 6 | 14 |
| 2 | 18 | FW | (Germany) | Jamie Leweling | 9 | 2 | 0 | 1 | 12 |
| 3 | 6 | MF | (Germany) | Angelo Stiller | 5 | 1 | 0 | 2 | 8 |
| 3 | 10 | FW | (Germany) | Chris Führich | 7 | 0 | 0 | 1 | 8 |
| 5 | 11 | MF | (Morocco) | Bilal El Khannouss | 5 | 2 | 0 | 0 | 7 |
| 6 | 7 | DF | (Germany) | Maximilian Mittelstädt | 4 | 1 | 0 | 1 | 6 |
| 7 | 9 | FW | (Bosnia and Herzegovina) | Ermedin Demirović | 3 | 1 | 0 | 0 | 4 |
| 8 | 3 | DF | (Netherlands) | Ramon Hendriks | 3 | 0 | 0 | 0 | 3 |
| 8 | 4 | DF | (Germany) | Josha Vagnoman | 3 | 0 | 0 | 0 | 3 |
| 8 | 8 | FW | (Portugal) | Tiago Tomás | 3 | 0 | 0 | 0 | 3 |
| 8 | 22 | DF | (France) | Lorenz Assignon | 0 | 0 | 0 | 3 | 3 |
| 8 | 28 | MF | (Denmark) | Nikolas Nartey | 3 | 0 | 0 | 0 | 3 |
| 13 | 33 | GK | (Germany) | Alexander Nübel | 1 | 0 | 0 | 1 | 2 |
| 14 | 14 | DF | (Switzerland) | Luca Jaquez | 1 | 0 | 0 | 0 | 1 |
| 14 | 16 | MF | (Turkey) | Atakan Karazor | 1 | 0 | 0 | 0 | 1 |
| 14 | 25 | FW | (Ecuador) | Jeremy Arévalo | 1 | 0 | 0 | 0 | 1 |
| 14 | 27 | MF | (Algeria) | Badredine Bouanani | 0 | 1 | 0 | 0 | 1 |
| 14 | 29 | DF | (Germany) | Finn Jeltsch | 1 | 0 | 0 | 0 | 1 |
| 14 | 30 | MF | (Spain) | Chema Andrés | 0 | 0 | 1 | 0 | 1 |
| Totals | | | | | 56 | 10 | 1 | 15 | 82 |

Source: FotMob

== Notes ==
- President Dietmar Allgaier was confirmed by member vote on 22 March 2025 (91.5%).
