= Mirza Catovic =

German footballer (born 2007)

Personal information
- Date of birth: 1 May 2007 (age 19)
- Place of birth: Tutin, Serbia
- Height: 1.90 m (6 ft 3 in)
- Position: Defensive midfielder

Team information
- Current team: Barcelona B (on loan from VfB Stuttgart)
- Number: 12

Youth career
- –2022: Rot-Weiss Frankfurt
- 2022–2025: VfB Stuttgart

Senior career*
Years	Team	Apps	(Gls)
2024–2026	VfB Stuttgart II	45	(2)
2025–	VfB Stuttgart	0	(0)
2026–	→ Barcelona B (loan)	8	(0)

International career^{‡}
2026–	Germany U19	8	(0)
- * Club domestic league appearances and goals as of 22 August 2026 ‡ National team caps and goals as of 11 July 2026

Mirza Catovic (Serbian Cyrillic: Мирза Ћатовић; born 1 May 2007) is a professional footballer who plays as a defensive midfielder for Segunda Federación club Barcelona Atlètic, on loan from Bundesliga club VfB Stuttgart. Born in Serbia, he is a Germany youth international.

== Club career ==
As a youth player, Catovic joined the youth academy of Rot-Weiss Frankfurt. Following his stint there, he joined the youth academy of VfB Stuttgart. Ahead of the 2024–25 season, he was promoted to the club's under-19 team, where he played in the UEFA Youth League.

The same year, he was promoted to their reserve team, where he was regarded to have established himself as a regular starter while playing for them. Subsequently, he was sent on loan to Spanish La Liga side Barcelona's reserve team ahead of the 2026–27 season.

== International career ==
Catovic has represented Germany internationally at youth level and has represented the country internationally at under-19 level. Besides Germany, he is eligible to represent Serbia and Bosnia and Herzegovina internationally.

During the spring of 2026, he played for the Germany national under-19 football team for 2026 UEFA European Under-19 Championship qualification. Three months later, he played for the Germany national under-19 football team at the 2026 UEFA European Under-19 Championship, helping the team achieve second place in the competition.

== Style of play ==
Catovic plays as a midfielder and is left-footed. He can also play as a defender.

Croatian news website Index.hr wrote in 2025 that he "is a defensive midfielder with exceptional tactical understanding of the game and physical strength. Ćatović is 190 cm tall, left-handed, known for accurate long balls and aggressive defensive style".
