= Bilal El Khannouss =

Footballer (born 2004)

- El Khannouss with Morocco in 2026

Personal information
- Full name: Bilal El Khannouss
- Date of birth: 10 May 2004 (age 22)
- Place of birth: Molenbeek-Saint-Jean, Belgium
- Height: 1.80 m (5 ft 11 in)
- Position: Attacking midfielder

Team information
- Current team: VfB Stuttgart
- Number: 11

Youth career
- 2009–2019: Anderlecht
- 2019–2022: Genk

Senior career*
Years	Team	Apps	(Gls)
2022–2024	Genk	78	(4)
2024–2026	Leicester City	34	(2)
2025–2026	→ VfB Stuttgart (loan)	25	(4)
2026–	VfB Stuttgart	8	(2)

International career^{‡}
2019	Belgium U15	3	(1)
2019–2020	Belgium U16	7	(2)
2021	Belgium U18	3	(1)
2022	Morocco U20	4	(0)
2022–	Morocco U23	12	(1)
2022–	Morocco	46	(3)
Medal record
Men's football
Representing Morocco
Africa Cup of Nations
Winner	2025 Morocco
U-23 Africa Cup of Nations
Winner	2023 Morocco
Olympic Games
Bronze medal – third place	2024 Paris	Team
- * Club domestic league appearances and goals as of 17:30, 31 October 2026 (UTC) ‡ National team caps and goals as of 19:33, 5 October 2026 (UTC)

Bilal El Khannouss (Arabic: بلال الخنوس; born 10 May 2004) is a professional footballer who plays as an attacking midfielder for Bundesliga club VfB Stuttgart. Born in Belgium, he plays for the Morocco national team.

== Club career ==
=== Genk ===
El Khannouss joined Anderlecht in 2009, but moved to Genk in 2019 due to a lack of playing opportunities. On 24 July 2020, he signed his first professional contract. He made his league debut on 21 May 2022 in a 0–0 draw against Mechelen.

On 1 November 2023, El Khannouss was nominated for the 2023 African Young Player of the Year by CAF.

=== Leicester City ===
El Khannouss signed for Premier League club Leicester City on 29 August 2024 on a four-year deal for a reported £21m fee. He was assigned the number 11 shirt. He made his Leicester debut on 31 August 2024 in a 2–1 loss against Aston Villa. His first start came in a 1–1 draw against Everton on 21 September 2024. He scored his first goal for the Foxes on 3 December 2024 in a 3–1 home league victory against West Ham United.

=== VfB Stuttgart ===
On 1 September 2025, El Khannouss joined VfB Stuttgart on loan. Later that month, on 19 September, he scored his first goal in a 2–0 victory over St. Pauli. On 25 May 2026, his loan spell was made permanent as he signed a long-term contract with the club.

== International career ==
Born in Belgium, El Khannouss is of Moroccan descent with origins in Tangier. A former youth international for Belgium, he switched to represent the Morocco U20s.

On 10 November 2022, El Khannous was named in Morocco's 26-man squad for the 2022 FIFA World Cup in Qatar. On 17 December, he made his international debut in the World Cup third-place playoff against Croatia, which ended in a 2–1 defeat.

In June 2023, El Khannous was included in the final squad of the under-23 national team for the 2023 U-23 Africa Cup of Nations, hosted by Morocco itself, where the Atlas Lions won their first title, and qualified for the 2024 Summer Olympics. On 21 March 2025, he scored his first international goal in a 2–1 victory over Niger during the 2026 FIFA World Cup qualification.

On 11 December 2025, El Khannouss was called up to the Morocco squad for the 2025 Africa Cup of Nations.

On 26 May 2026, El Khannouss was selected in the 26-man squad for the 2026 FIFA World Cup.

== Career statistics ==
=== Club ===
As of match played 3 November 2026

Appearances and goals by club, season and competition
Club	Season	League			National cup (Note: Includes Belgian Cup, FA Cup, DFB-Pokal)		League cup (Note: Includes EFL Cup)		Europe		Total	
Club	Season	Division	Apps	Goals	Apps	Goals	Apps	Goals	Apps	Goals	Apps	Goals
Genk	2021–22	Belgian Pro League	1	0	0	0	—		0	0	1	0
Genk	2022–23	Belgian Pro League	39	1	2	0	—		—		41	1
Genk	2023–24	Belgian Pro League	37	3	2	0	—		12 (Note: Two appearances in UEFA Champions League, two appearances in UEFA Europa League, eight appearances in UEFA Europa Conference League)	0	51	3
Genk	2024–25	Belgian Pro League	1	0	—		—		—		1	0
Genk	Total		78	4	4	0	—		12	0	94	4
Leicester City	2024–25	Premier League	32	2	2	0	2	1	—		36	3
Leicester City	2025–26	Championship	2	0	0	0	1	0	—		3	0
Leicester City	Total		34	2	2	0	3	1	—		39	3
VfB Stuttgart (loan)	2025–26	Bundesliga	25	4	5	0	—		11 (Note: Appearances in UEFA Europa League)	5	41	9
VfB Stuttgart	2026–27	Bundesliga	8	2	2	0	—		4 (Note: Appearances in UEFA Champions League)	0	14	2
Career total			144	11	13	0	3	1	27	5	186	17

=== International ===
As of match played 4 October 2026

Appearances and goals by national team and year
National team	Year	Apps	Goals
Morocco	2022	1	0
Morocco	2023	6	0
Morocco	2024	11	0
Morocco	2025	11	2
Morocco	2026	17	1
Total		46	3

Morocco score listed first, score column indicates score after each El Khannouss goal.

List of international goals scored by Bilal El Khannouss
No.	Date	Venue	Opponent	Score	Result	Competition
1	21 March 2025	Honor Stadium, Oujda, Morocco	Niger	2–1	2–1	2026 FIFA World Cup qualification
2	18 November 2025	Ibn Batouta Stadium, Tangier, Morocco	Uganda	4–0	4–0	Friendly
3	31 March 2026	Stade Bollaert-Delelis, Lens, France	Paraguay	1–0	2–1	Friendly

== Honours ==
VfB Stuttgart

- DFB-Pokal runner-up: 2025–26

Morocco U23

- U-23 Africa Cup of Nations: 2023
- Olympic Bronze Medal: 2024

Morocco

- Africa Cup of Nations: 2025

Individual

- Belgian Golden Shoe Best Young Player: 2022, 2024
- Belgian Lion Award: 2023
- Dominique D'Onofrio Award: 2022
- Genk Player of the Season: 2023–24
- Belgian Pro League Young Professional Footballer of the Season: 2023–24

Orders

- Order of the Throne: 2022
