= Finn Jeltsch =

German footballer (born 2006)

Personal information
- Full name: Finn Jahn Jeltsch
- Date of birth: 17 July 2006 (age 20)
- Place of birth: Neuendettelsau, Germany
- Height: 1.88 m (6 ft 2 in)
- Positions: Centre-back; defensive midfielder

Team information
- Current team: VfB Stuttgart
- Number: 29

Youth career
- 2013–2015: SV Raitersaich
- 2015–2023: 1. FC Nürnberg

Senior career*
Years	Team	Apps	(Gls)
2023–2025	1. FC Nürnberg	31	(1)
2025–	VfB Stuttgart	43	(0)

International career^{‡}
2021–2022	Germany U16	4	(2)
2022–2023	Germany U17	25	(0)
2024–2025	Germany U18	1	(0)
2024–2025	Germany U19	7	(0)
2025–2026	Germany U21	6	(0)
2026–	Germany	1	(0)
Medal record
Men's football
Representing Germany
FIFA U-17 World Cup
Winner	2023 Indonesia
UEFA European Under-17 Championship
Winner	2023 Hungary
- * Club domestic league appearances and goals as of 17:28, 31 October 2026 (UTC) ‡ National team caps and goals as of 16 November 2026

Finn Jahn Jeltsch (German pronunciation: [fɪn jɛltʃ]; born 17 July 2006) is a German professional footballer who plays as a centre-back or defensive midfielder for Bundesliga club VfB Stuttgart and the Germany national team.

== Club career ==
Jeltsch started his playing career with SV Raitersaich before joining 1. FC Nürnberg in 2015. On 18 February 2024, the U-17 European and World Champion made his professional debut for Nürnberg in the 2. Bundesliga, coming on as a half-time substitute during a 1–1 against 1. FC Kaiserslautern. In June 2024, he signed a new long-term contract with the club.

On 3 February 2025, Jeltsch signed a five-and-a-half-year contract with VfB Stuttgart until June 2030. He made his Bundesliga debut on 15 February, coming on as a substitute in a 2–1 loss to Wolfsburg. Ever since, the talented centre-back has become part of the starting line-up in the majority of Stuttgart's matches, e.g. by starting against Bayern Munich in a 3–1 away loss; although he was praised for his performances by his coach. On 2 April, he played full 90 minutes and a crucial role in the DFB-Pokal semi-final, a 3–1 victory over RB Leipzig, helping his team advance to the final for the first time in 12 years. Fabian Wohlgemuth, CEO of sports at VfB Stuttgart, praised the 18-year old for his performances: "He's currently a regular at the back. He's stabilized even further over the past few weeks and has become an important factor in our defense." Jeltsch would play in the final and help his side win the DFB-Pokal and thus their first title in 18 years.

On 25 September 2026, he would make his European debut in the Europa League league phase, a 2–1 victory over Celta Vigo. On 23 May 2026, he would play in his second DFB-Pokal final, a 3–0 loss to Bayern Munich.

== International career ==
Jeltsch was part of the Germany U17 side who won both the FIFA U-17 World Cup and the UEFA European Under-17 Championship in 2023. He has represented Germany up to under–19 level.

In May 2025, he was called up to the Germany U21 national team for the UEFA European Under-21 Championship, but he ultimately had to withdraw due to an injury. His side reached the final, but lost.

In September 2026, Jeltsch was one of players who were called up with the Germany national team by head coach Jürgen Klopp for the 2026–27 UEFA Nations League matches against Netherlands, Greece, Serbia and Greece between 24 September and 4 October 2026.

== Career statistics ==
As of match played 31 October 2026

Appearances and goals by club, season and competition
Club	Season	League			DFB-Pokal		Europe		Other		Total	
Club	Season	Division	Apps	Goals	Apps	Goals	Apps	Goals	Apps	Goals	Apps	Goals
1. FC Nürnberg	2023–24	2. Bundesliga	13	0	0	0	—		—		13	0
1. FC Nürnberg	2024–25	2. Bundesliga	18	1	2	0	—		—		20	1
1. FC Nürnberg	Total		31	1	2	0	—		—		33	1
VfB Stuttgart	2024–25	Bundesliga	12	0	2	0	0	0	—		14	0
VfB Stuttgart	2025–26	Bundesliga	23	0	4	0	10 (Note: Appearances in UEFA Europa League)	0	0	0	37	0
VfB Stuttgart	2026–27	Bundesliga	8	0	1	0	2 (Note: Appearances in UEFA Champions League)	0	—		11	0
VfB Stuttgart	Total		43	0	7	0	12	0	0	0	62	0
Career total			74	1	9	0	12	0	0	0	95	1

=== International ===
As of match played 16 November 2026

Appearances and goals by national team and year
National team	Year	Apps	Goals
Germany	2026	1	0
Total		1	0

== Honours ==
VfB Stuttgart

- DFB-Pokal: 2024–25; runner-up:2025–26

Germany U17

- UEFA European Under-17 Championship: 2023
- FIFA U-17 World Cup: 2023

Individual

- UEFA European Under-17 Championship Team of the Tournament: 2023
- Fritz Walter Medal U19 Gold: 2025
