= Lazar Jovanović (footballer, born 2006) =

Serbian footballer

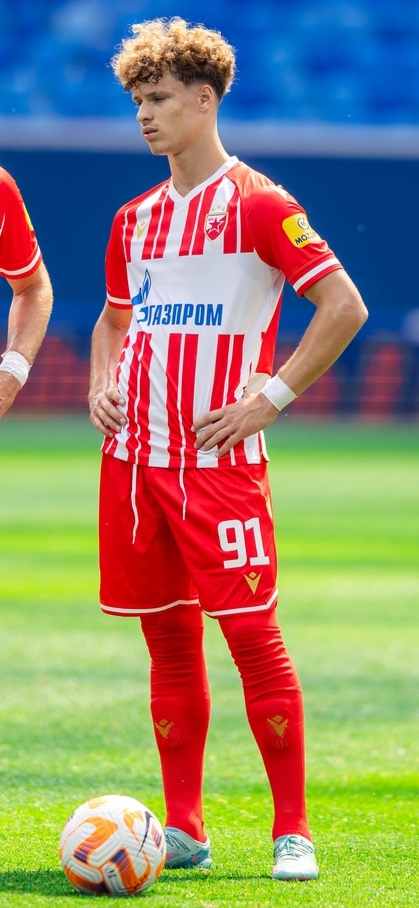
- Jovanović with Red Star Belgrade in 2024

Personal information
- Date of birth: 30 November 2006 (age 19)
- Place of birth: Novi Sad, Serbia
- Height: 1.84 m (6 ft 0 in)
- Position: Forward

Team information
- Current team: Udinese
- Number: 91

Youth career
- Vojvodina

Senior career*
Years	Team	Apps	(Gls)
2023–2024	Vojvodina	16	(1)
2024–2025	Red Star Belgrade	5	(1)
2025	→ OFK Beograd (loan)	15	(4)
2025–2026	VfB Stuttgart	3	(0)
2026–	Udinese	1	(0)

International career^{‡}
2022–2023	Serbia U17	4	(3)
2025	Serbia U19	5	(2)
2025–	Serbia U21	5	(1)
- * Club domestic league appearances and goals as of 12 October 2026 ‡ National team caps and goals as of 18 November 2025

Lazar Jovanović (Serbian Cyrillic: Лазар Јовановић; born 30 November 2006) is a Serbian professional footballer who plays as a forward for Serie A club Udinese.

== Club career ==
=== Vojvodina ===
In late December 2022, Jovanović signed his first professional contract with Vojvodina, penning a three-year deal with the club. On 30 July 2023, Jovanović made his first-team debut, replacing another first-team debutant Stefan Bukinac in the 72nd minute, in a 0–5 away loss to Red Star Belgrade. He scored for the first time in the Serbian SuperLiga in March 2024 against FK Voždovac.

=== Red Star Belgrade ===
In the summer of 2024, Jovanović moved to Red Star Belgrade.

==== Loan to OFK Beograd ====
In February 2025, Jovanović was loaned out to OFK Beograd until the end of the season.

=== VfB Stuttgart ===
On 8 July 2025, Jovanović signed a four-year-contract with VfB Stuttgart.

=== Udinese ===
On 1 September 2026, Jovanović moved to Udinese in Italy on a five-year contract.

== Personal life ==
Lazar is the eldest son of Serbian former professional footballer Milan Jovanović. He was born in Novi Sad, and has two brothers, Dušan and Miloš.

== Career statistics ==
As of match played 11 December 2025

Appearances and goals by club, season and competition
Club	Season	League			National cup		Europe		Other		Total	
Club	Season	Division	Apps	Goals	Apps	Goals	Apps	Goals	Apps	Goals	Apps	Goals
Vojvodina	2023–24	Serbian SuperLiga	16	1	1	0	0	0	—		17	1
Red Star Belgrade	2024–25	Serbian SuperLiga	5	1	0	0	0	0	—		5	1
OFK Beograd (loan)	2024–25	Serbian SuperLiga	15	4	—		—		—		15	4
VfB Stuttgart	2025–26	Bundesliga	3	0	0	0	3 (Note: Appearances in UEFA Europa League)	0	—		6	0
Career total			39	6	1	0	3	0	0	0	43	6
