= Ramon Hendriks =

Dutch footballer

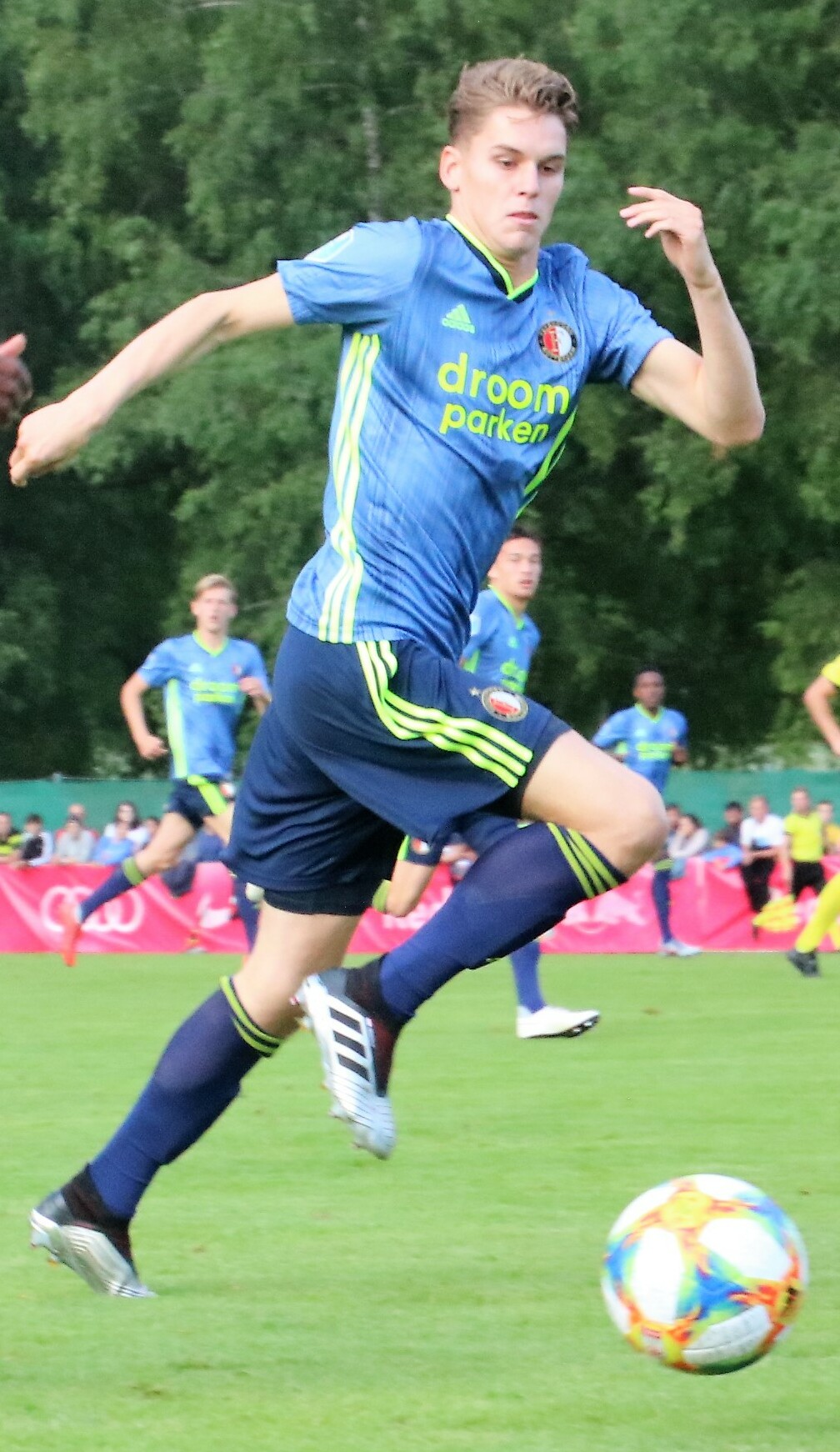
- Hendriks playing for Feyenoord in 2019

Personal information
- Date of birth: 18 July 2001 (age 25)
- Place of birth: Dordrecht, Netherlands
- Height: 1.89 m (6 ft 2 in)
- Position: Centre-back

Team information
- Current team: VfB Stuttgart
- Number: 3

Youth career
- –2017: ASWH
- 2017–2021: Feyenoord

Senior career*
Years	Team	Apps	(Gls)
2021–2024	Feyenoord	8	(0)
2021	→ NAC (loan)	19	(0)
2022–2023	→ Utrecht (loan)	4	(0)
2022–2023	→ Jong Utrecht (loan)	2	(0)
2023–2024	→ Vitesse (loan)	31	(0)
2024–	VfB Stuttgart	63	(0)

International career
2017–2018	Netherlands U17	14	(0)
2018	Netherlands U18	3	(0)
2019	Netherlands U19	7	(0)
- * Club domestic league appearances and goals as of 31 October 2026

Ramon Hendriks (born 18 July 2001) is a Dutch professional footballer who plays as a defender for Bundesliga club VfB Stuttgart.

== Club career ==
Born in Hendrik-Ido-Ambacht, Hendriks played youth football for local amateur side ASWH before joining Feyenoord in 2017. In January 2021, he joined NAC Breda on loan until the end of the season, where he made 19 appearances. He made his Eredivisie debut for Feyenoord on 15 August 2021 as a substitute in a 4–0 win over Willem II.

On 8 June 2022, Hendriks was loaned to Utrecht for the season, with an option to buy. On 31 August 2023, he was loaned to Vitesse for the 2023–24 season.

On 26 June 2024, he signed a four-year contract with Bundesliga club VfB Stuttgart.

== International career ==
Hendriks has represented the Netherlands at under-17, under-18 and under-19 international levels. He made 5 appearances as the Netherlands won the 2018 UEFA European Under-17 Championship.

== Career statistics ==
As of match played 3 November 2026

Appearances and goals by club, season and competition
Club	Season	League			National cup (Note: Includes KNVB Cup, DFB-Pokal)		Europe		Other		Total	
Club	Season	Division	Apps	Goals	Apps	Goals	Apps	Goals	Apps	Goals	Apps	Goals
Feyenoord	2020–21	Eredivisie	0	0	0	0	0	0	0	0	0	0
Feyenoord	2021–22	Eredivisie	5	0	0	0	2 (Note: Appearance(s) in UEFA Europa Conference League)	0	0	0	7	0
Feyenoord	Total		5	0	0	0	2	0	0	0	7	0
NAC Breda (loan)	2020–21	Eerste Divisie	19	0	0	0	—		3 (Note: Appearances in Eerste Divisie promotion play-offs)	0	22	0
Utrecht (loan)	2022–23	Eredivisie	4	0	0	0	—		—		4	0
Jong FC Utrecht (loan)	2022–23	Eerste Divisie	2	0	—		—		—		2	0
Vitesse (loan)	2023–24	Eredivisie	31	0	4	0	—		—		35	0
VfB Stuttgart	2024–25	Bundesliga	25	0	5	0	0	0	0	0	30	0
VfB Stuttgart	2025–26	Bundesliga	31	0	6	0	12 (Note: Appearances in UEFA Europa League)	0	1 (Note: Appearance in Franz Beckenbauer Supercup)	0	50	0
VfB Stuttgart	2026–27	Bundesliga	7	0	1	0	4 (Note: Appearances in UEFA Champions League)	0	—		12	0
VfB Stuttgart	Total		63	0	12	0	16	0	1	0	92	0
Career total			124	0	16	0	18	0	4	0	162	0

== Honours ==
Feyenoord

- UEFA Europa Conference League runner-up: 2021–22

VfB Stuttgart

- DFB-Pokal: 2024–25

Netherlands U17

- UEFA European Under-17 Championship: 2018
