= Nikolas Nartey =

Danish footballer (born 2000)

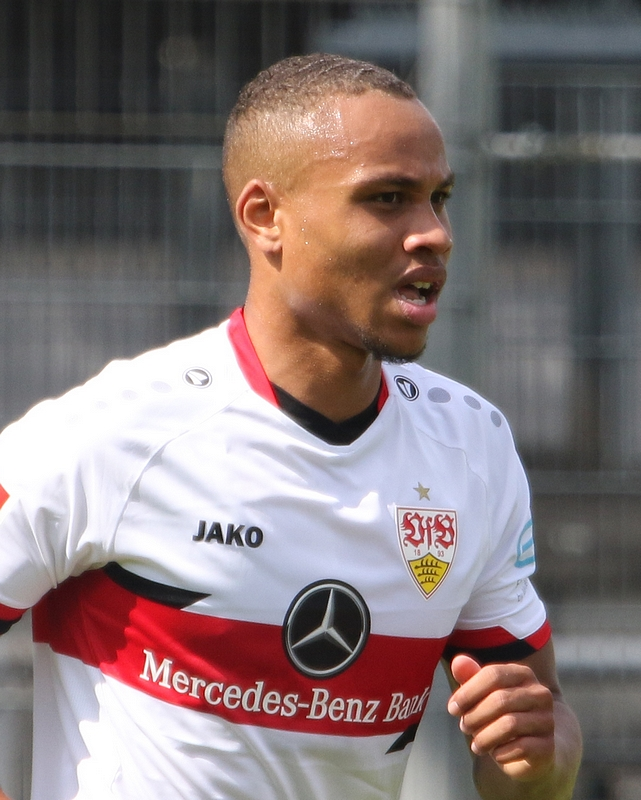
- Nartey with VfB Stuttgart in 2021

Personal information
- Full name: Nikolas Terkelsen Nartey
- Date of birth: 22 February 2000 (age 26)
- Place of birth: Bagsværd, Denmark
- Height: 1.85 m (6 ft 1 in)
- Position: Midfielder

Team information
- Current team: VfB Stuttgart
- Number: 28

Youth career
- 2008–2013: AB
- 2013–2017: Copenhagen
- 2017–2018: 1. FC Köln

Senior career*
Years	Team	Apps	(Gls)
2017–2019	1. FC Köln II	27	(3)
2017–2019	1. FC Köln	2	(0)
2019–	VfB Stuttgart	48	(4)
2021–2025	VfB Stuttgart II	9	(1)
2019–2020	→ Hansa Rostock (loan)	19	(1)
2020–2021	→ SV Sandhausen (loan)	24	(0)

International career^{‡}
2015–2016	Denmark U16	5	(0)
2016–2017	Denmark U17	11	(6)
2017–2018	Denmark U18	4	(1)
2018–2019	Denmark U19	5	(0)
2019–2022	Denmark U21	16	(2)
2026–	Denmark	2	(0)
- * Club domestic league appearances and goals as of 17:31, 31 October 2026 (UTC) ‡ National team caps and goals as of 23:10, 1 October 2026 (UTC)

Nikolas Terkelsen Nartey (born 22 February 2000) is a Danish professional footballer who plays as a midfielder for Bundesliga club VfB Stuttgart and the Denmark national team.

== Club career ==
=== Youth career ===
Nartey began his career at the age of 8 at AB. He then joined F.C. Copenhagen at the age of 12. At 16 years old, he had already played for the U19 squad of F.C. Copenhagen. He played five UEFA Youth League games.

=== 1. FC Köln ===
At the age of 16, Nartey joined 1. FC Köln in Germany on 31 January 2017 for about 4 million danish krone. Meanwhile, he was not able to play until 19 April because of some problems with his papers. He only managed to play four games in that first half season for the reserve team.

He got his professional debut for 1. FC Köln on 26 November 2017 when he came in from the bench with 7 minutes left against Hertha BSC. However, it was not a successful year for Nartey, due to several knee-injuries in the 2017–18 season.

=== VfB Stuttgart ===
On 29 August 2019, Nartey joined VfB Stuttgart on a four-year deal. A day later after joining Stuttgart, Nartey was loaned out to Hansa Rostock for the 2019–20 season.

On 31 July 2020, Nartey was loaned out to SV Sandhausen until the end of the season.

On 17 May 2025, Nartey returned to the Bundesliga after long injury. He extended his contract with VfB Stuttgart for another year, until 30 June 2026.

== International career ==
Nartey is a Denmark youth international, having represented the U16, U17, U18, U19 and U21 teams.

He was one of the players who were called-up with the Denmark national team by head coach Brian Riemer for the UEFA Nations League matches against Norway, Wales (home and away) and Portugal on 24, 27 September and 1, 4 October 2026.

== Personal life ==
Nartey is of Ghanaian descent through his father and his mother is Danish. His younger brother, Noah Nartey, is also a professional footballer.

== Career statistics ==
=== Club ===
As of match played 3 November 2026

Appearances and goals by club, season and competition
Club	Season	League			DFB-Pokal		Europe		Other		Total	
Club	Season	Division	Apps	Goals	Apps	Goals	Apps	Goals	Apps	Goals	Apps	Goals
1. FC Köln II	2016–17	Regionalliga West	4	0	—		—		—		4	0
1. FC Köln II	2017–18	Regionalliga West	4	0	—		—		—		4	0
1. FC Köln II	2018–19	Regionalliga West	17	3	—		—		—		17	3
1. FC Köln II	2019–20	Regionalliga West	2	0	—		—		—		2	0
1. FC Köln II	Total		27	3	—		—		—		27	3
1. FC Köln	2017–18	Bundesliga	1	0	0	0	0	0	—		1	0
1. FC Köln	2018–19	2. Bundesliga	1	0	—		—		—		1	0
1. FC Köln	Total		2	0	0	0	0	0	—		2	0
VfB Stuttgart	2021–22	Bundesliga	8	0	0	0	—		—		8	0
VfB Stuttgart	2022–23	Bundesliga	9	0	2	0	—		2 (Note: Appearances in Bundesliga relegation play-offs)	0	13	0
VfB Stuttgart	2023–24	Bundesliga	0	0	0	0	—		—		0	0
VfB Stuttgart	2024–25	Bundesliga	1	0	1	0	0	0	0	0	2	0
VfB Stuttgart	2025–26	Bundesliga	28	4	4	0	5 (Note: Appearances in UEFA Europa League)	0	1 (Note: Appearance in Franz Beckenbauer Supercup)	0	38	4
VfB Stuttgart	2026–27	Bundesliga	2	0	1	0	1 (Note: Apeparances in UEFA Champions League)	0	—		4	0
VfB Stuttgart	Total		48	4	8	0	6	0	3	0	65	4
VfB Stuttgart II	2020–21	Regionalliga Südwest	1	0	—		—		—		1	0
VfB Stuttgart II	2024–25	3. Liga	7	1	—		—		—		7	1
VfB Stuttgart II	2025–26	3. Liga	1	0	—		—		—		1	0
VfB Stuttgart II	Total		9	1	—		—		—		9	1
Hansa Rostock (loan)	2019–20	3. Liga	19	1	—		—		—		19	1
SV Sandhausen (loan)	2020–21	2. Bundesliga	24	0	2	0	—		—		26	0
Career total			129	9	10	0	6	0	3	0	148	9

=== International ===
As of match played 1 October 2026

Appearances and goals by national team and year
National team	Year	Apps	Goals
Denmark	2026	2	0
Total		2	0

== Honours ==
VfB Stuttgart

- DFB-Pokal: 2024–25
