= Jeff Chabot =

German footballer

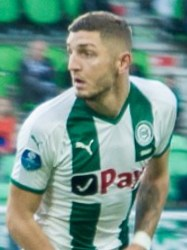
- Chabot with Groningen in 2018

Personal information
- Full name: Julian Jeffrey Gaston Chabot
- Date of birth: 12 February 1998 (age 28)
- Place of birth: Hanau, Germany
- Height: 1.95 m (6 ft 5 in)
- Position: Centre-back

Team information
- Current team: VfB Stuttgart
- Number: 24

Youth career
- Darmstadt 98
- 2005–2010: Eintracht Frankfurt
- 2010–2011: 1. FC Nürnberg
- 2011–2014: Eintracht Frankfurt
- 2014–2017: RB Leipzig

Senior career*
Years	Team	Apps	(Gls)
2016–2017	RB Leipzig II	1	(0)
2017–2018	Sparta Rotterdam	20	(2)
2018–2019	Groningen	28	(1)
2019–2023	Sampdoria	19	(1)
2020–2021	→ Spezia (loan)	25	(1)
2022–2023	→ 1. FC Köln (loan)	25	(0)
2023–2024	1. FC Köln	32	(0)
2024–	VfB Stuttgart	66	(4)

International career^{‡}
2014	Germany U17	1	(0)
2016–2017	Germany U19	6	(1)
2017	Germany U20	2	(0)
2019	Germany U21	4	(0)
- * Club domestic league appearances and goals as of 22:30, 31 October 2026 (UTC) ‡ National team caps and goals as of 15 October 2019

Julian Jeffrey Gaston Chabot (born 12 February 1998), better known as Jeff Chabot (German pronunciation: [d͡ʒef ʃaˈboː]), is a German professional footballer who plays as a centre-back for Bundesliga club VfB Stuttgart.

== Early life ==
Chabot was born on 12 February 1998 in Hanau to a German father and a French mother. He grew up in Dieburg, a small town in Hesse near Darmstadt.

== Club career ==
Chabot started his career with Eintracht Frankfurt in 2010, before joining RB Leipzig in 2014; he joined the reserve squad in 2016.

=== Sparta Rotterdam (2017–2018) ===
In 2017, he joined Sparta Rotterdam, and made his Eredivisie debut for the club on 12 August 2017 in a game against VVV-Venlo.

=== Groningen (2018–2019) ===
Chabot joined FC Groningen in 2018; he made 29 competitive appearances for the club during the 2018–19 season, scoring a goal and providing one assist, helping the club to an eighth-place finish in the Eredivisie.

=== Sampdoria (2019–2022) ===
On 24 May 2019, Chabot signed with Serie A club Sampdoria for €3.7 million, on a five-year contract that would keep him at the club until 30 June 2024; the deal officially went through on 1 July, once the transfer window had re-opened.

==== Loan to Spezia: 2020–2021 ====
On 24 September 2020, Chabot joined Spezia on loan until 30 June 2021.

=== 1. FC Köln (2022–2024) ===
On 26 January 2022, he joined Bundesliga club 1. FC Köln on loan until 30 June 2023. On 24 January 2023, Chabot made his first assist for Köln by assisting Ellyes Skhiri after receiving the ball from a Florian Kainz corner. In May 2023, Köln announced that Chabot would join the club on a permanent basis and sign a contract until 2026.

Chabot announced his departure from Köln on 23 May 2024, following relegation from the Bundesliga.

=== VfB Stuttgart (2024–present) ===
On 25 May 2024, fellow Bundesliga club VfB Stuttgart announced the signing of Chabot on a contract lasting until 2028. He made his debut in a pre-season friendly against FSV Hollenbach on 7 June 2024. Chabot made his UEFA Champions League debut on 17 September 2024 against Real Madrid. After a game against Juventus on matchday 3 of the Champions League, Chabot was announced as part of the team of the week.

On 26 October 2024 Chabot received his first red card of the season on the 66th minute of a match against Holstein Kiel, following a second booking after a conflict with Nicolai Remberg.

== Player profile ==
=== Style of play ===
Chabot is a physically robust, left-footed centre-back, who is known for his tough tackling. Pace is one of his weak points, as noted by Luca Vaccaro of Gazetta della Spezia. The German media has dubbed him Türsteher (doorman) for his ability of stopping strikers from scoring into the "door" (net).

== Personal life ==
Chabot has a tattoo of himself as a child alongside his brother on his arm.

== International career ==
Chabot's heritage means he can either represent France or Germany. He is a youth international for Germany, and has represented the nation at U17, U19, and U20s level.

== Career statistics ==
As of match played 3 November 2026

Appearances and goals by club, season and competition
Club	Season	League			National cup		Europe		Other		Total	
Club	Season	Division	Apps	Goals	Apps	Goals	Apps	Goals	Apps	Goals	Apps	Goals
RB Leipzig II	2016–17	Regionalliga Nordost	1	0	—		—		—		1	0
Sparta Rotterdam	2017–18	Eredivisie	20	2	1	0	—		—		21	2
Jong Sparta Rotterdam	2017–18	Tweede Divisie	2	0	—		—		—		2	0
Groningen	2018–19	Eredivisie	28	1	1	0	—		0	0	29	1
Sampdoria	2019–20	Serie A	8	1	1	0	—		—		9	1
Sampdoria	2020–21	Serie A	0	0	0	0	—		—		0	0
Sampdoria	Total		8	1	1	0	0	0	0	0	9	1
Spezia (loan)	2020–21	Serie A	25	1	2	0	—		—		27	1
1. FC Köln (loan)	2021–22	Bundesliga	4	0	0	0	—		0	0	4	0
1. FC Köln (loan)	2022–23	Bundesliga	21	0	1	0	1 (Note: Appearance in UEFA Europa Conference League)	0	—		23	0
1. FC Köln (loan)	Total		25	0	1	0	1	0	0	0	27	0
1. FC Köln	2023–24	Bundesliga	32	0	2	1	—		—		34	1
VfB Stuttgart	2024–25	Bundesliga	31	3	5	0	8 (Note: Appearances in UEFA Champions League)	0	1 (Note: Appearance in Franz Beckenbauer Supercup)	0	45	3
VfB Stuttgart	2025–26	Bundesliga	27	0	5	0	8 (Note: Appearances in UEFA Europa League)	0	1	0	41	0
VfB Stuttgart	2026–27	Bundesliga	8	1	2	0	4	0	—		14	1
VfB Stuttgart	Total		66	4	12	0	20	0	2	0	101	4
Career total			207	9	20	1	21	0	2	0	250	10

== Honours ==
VfB Stuttgart

- DFB-Pokal: 2024–25
