= Chema Andrés =

Spanish footballer (born 2005)

Personal information
- Full name: José María Andrés Baixauli
- Date of birth: 25 April 2005 (age 21)
- Place of birth: Valencia, Spain
- Height: 1.93 m (6 ft 4 in)
- Position: Defensive midfielder

Team information
- Current team: Brighton & Hove Albion
- Number: 14

Youth career
- 2010–2013: Bétera
- 2013–2018: Levante
- 2018–2024: Real Madrid

Senior career*
Years	Team	Apps	(Gls)
2024	Real Madrid C	7	(3)
2024–2025	Real Madrid B	35	(0)
2025	Real Madrid	2	(0)
2025–2026	VfB Stuttgart	26	(3)
2026–	Brighton & Hove Albion	7	(1)

International career^{‡}
2022–2023	Spain U18	4	(0)
2023–2024	Spain U19	10	(1)
2025–	Spain U21	7	(0)
Medal record
Men's football
Representing Spain
UEFA European Under-19 Championship
Winner	2024 Northern Ireland
- * Club domestic league appearances and goals as of 8 November 2026 ‡ National team caps and goals as of 25 September 2026

José María Andrés Baixauli (born 25 April 2005), known as Chema Andrés or simply Chema, is a Spanish professional footballer who plays as a defensive midfielder for Premier League club Brighton & Hove Albion.

== Early life ==
Chema was born in 2005 in Valencia, Spain. He joined the youth academy of Spanish side Levante at the age of eight. In 2018, he joined the Real Madrid Academy from Levante at just 13 years old and has since played across various categories, progressing from Infantil to Real Madrid Castilla.

== Club career ==
=== Real Madrid ===
Chema was a key member of the Real Madrid Juvenil A team that won the under-19 domestic treble during the 2022–23 season, claiming the Copa del Rey Juvenil, finishing first in Group 5 of the División de Honor Juvenil, and winning the Copa de Campeones.

He began his senior career with Real Madrid Castilla in 2024, after being promoted directly from the Juvenil A team to the reserves, bypassing the usual step of joining Real Madrid C. He made his senior debut with Real Madrid in a round of 32 Copa del Rey fixture against Minera on January 6, 2025. He came on in the 63rd minute of the second half, replacing Brahim Díaz.

On January 19, 2025, Chema made his senior debut in La Liga during a match against Las Palmas, substituting Dani Ceballos in the 83rd minute. The match ended with 4-1 victory for Real Madrid.

=== VfB Stuttgart ===
On 27 July 2025, Chema joined German Bundesliga club VfB Stuttgart for €3 million. He signed a contract with the club until 30 June 2030 and was assigned the number 30 shirt.

=== Brighton & Hove Albion ===
On 1 September 2026, Chema signed for Premier League club Brighton & Hove Albion on a five-year contract. He made his Brighton debut on 13 September 2026 in a 5–0 Premier League victory over Coventry City at the CBS Arena, before scoring his first goal for the club six days later in a 3–0 home league win over Arsenal.

== International career ==
Chema is a youth international for Spain. He was called up for the 2024 UEFA European Under-19 Championship in Northern Ireland. He scored his first goal for the Spain U19 in a Group B match against Denmark, which ended in a 2–1 victory. He started in four of Spain's five matches during the tournament, including the final, where Spain defeated France 2–0 to win their 12th UEFA European Under-19 Championship title.

== Style of play ==
Chema mainly operates as a defensive midfielder. He has received comparisons to Spain international Sergio Busquets. Chema has also frequently been compared to Madrid native Rodri due to their similar physical attributes, playing position, and style of play.

Chema is known for his tactical discipline, maintaining good positioning on the field, and rarely making mistakes in possession. He is capable of progressing the ball through vertical passes and typically plays as a classic pivot or number 5. His strengths include tactical intelligence, vision, and the ability to deliver high-quality vertical passes.

== Personal life ==
During his time at Real Madrid's academy, Chema began studying a degree in Business Administration with Business Analytics in English, having enrolled in the bilingual program.

== Career statistics ==
As of match played 8 November 2026

Appearances and goals by club, season and competition
Club	Season	League			National cup (Note: Includes Copa del Rey, DFB-Pokal)		League cup (Note: Includes EFL Cup)		Europe		Other		Total	
Club	Season	Division	Apps	Goals	Apps	Goals	Apps	Goals	Apps	Goals	Apps	Goals	Apps	Goals
Real Madrid C	2023–24	Tercera Federación	7	3	—		—		—		—		7	3
Real Madrid Castilla	2023–24	Primera Federación	3	0	—		—		—		—		3	0
Real Madrid Castilla	2024–25	Primera Federación	32	0	—		—		—		0	0	32	0
Real Madrid Castilla	Total		35	0	—		—		—		0	0	35	0
Real Madrid	2024–25	La Liga	2	0	1	0	—		0	0	0	0	3	0
VfB Stuttgart	2025–26	Bundesliga	25	3	4	0	—		9 (Note: Appearances in UEFA Europa League)	1	1 (Note: Appearance in Franz Beckenbauer Supercup)	0	39	4
VfB Stuttgart	2026–27	Bundesliga	1	0	1	0	—		—		—		2	0
VfB Stuttgart	Total		26	3	4	0	—		9	1	1	0	41	4
Brighton & Hove Albion	2026–27	Premier League	7	1	0	0	1	0	1 (Note: Appearances in UEFA Conference League)	0	–		9	1
Career total			77	7	6	0	1	0	10	1	1	0	95	8

== Honours ==
Spain U19

- UEFA European Under-19 Championship: 2024
