= Chris Führich =

German footballer

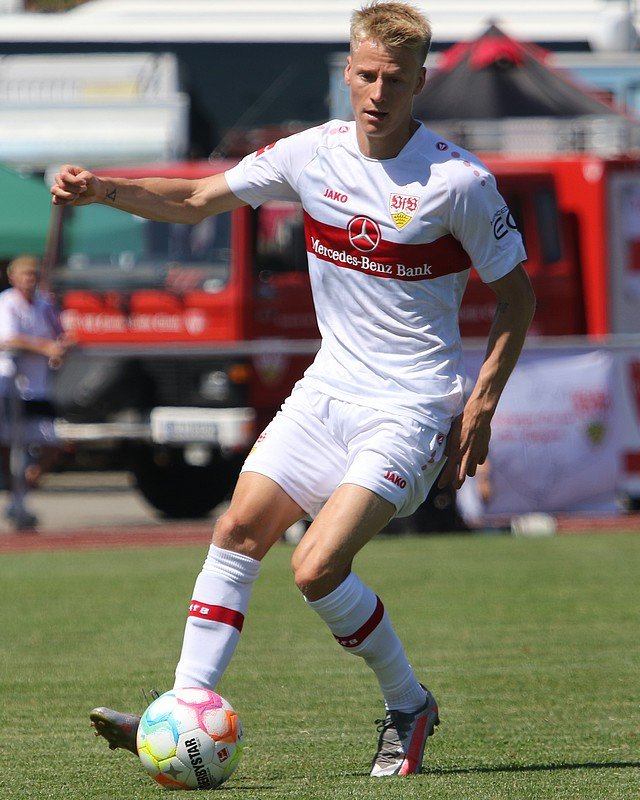
- Führich playing for VfB Stuttgart in 2022

Personal information
- Full name: Chris Jan Führich
- Date of birth: 9 January 1998 (age 28)
- Place of birth: Castrop-Rauxel, Germany
- Height: 1.81 m (5 ft 11 in)
- Positions: Left winger; left wing-back; attacking midfielder

Team information
- Current team: VfB Stuttgart
- Number: 10

Youth career
- 2005–2006: SG Suderwich
- 2006–2013: Schalke 04
- 2013–2015: Borussia Dortmund
- 2015: VfL Bochum
- 2015–2017: Rot-Weiß Oberhausen

Senior career*
Years	Team	Apps	(Gls)
2017–2019	1. FC Köln II	64	(7)
2017–2019	1. FC Köln	2	(0)
2019–2021	Borussia Dortmund II	24	(8)
2020–2021	→ SC Paderborn (loan)	34	(13)
2021–	VfB Stuttgart	165	(26)

International career^{‡}
2023–	Germany	10	(0)
- * Club domestic league appearances and goals as of 17:30, 31 October 2026 (UTC) ‡ National team caps and goals as of 09:32, 25 September 2026 (UTC)

Chris Jan Führich (German pronunciation: [kʁɪs ˈfyːʁɪç]; born 9 January 1998) is a German professional footballer who plays as a left winger or left wing-back for Bundesliga club VfB Stuttgart and the Germany national team.

== Club career ==
Führich started his career at 1. FC Köln, before joining Borussia Dortmund II in 2019. He signed a four-year contract with VfB Stuttgart on 19 July 2021.

On 31 October 2021, he scored his first Bundesliga goal for Stuttgart in a 4–1 defeat against Augsburg. On 3 September 2022, he scored his first goal of the 2022–23 season in a 1–1 draw against his former youth club, Schalke 04, followed by Stuttgart's first goal in a 2–2 draw against Bayern Munich on 10 September. On 1 February 2024, Führich extended his contract with VfB Stuttgart until June 2028.

== International career ==
In October 2023, Führich received his first call-up to the German senior national team for two friendly matches against the United States and Mexico. He debuted against the former in a 3–1 victory on 12 October. Führich was named in Germany's squad for UEFA Euro 2024.

== Personal life ==
He is a Christian.

== Career statistics ==
=== Club ===
As of match played 3 November 2026

Appearances and goals by club, season and competition
Club	Season	League			DFB-Pokal		Europe		Other		Total	
Club	Season	Division	Apps	Goals	Apps	Goals	Apps	Goals	Apps	Goals	Apps	Goals
1. FC Köln II	2017–18	Regionalliga West	31	2	—		—		—		31	2
1. FC Köln II	2018–19	Regionalliga West	33	5	—		—		—		33	5
1. FC Köln II	Total		64	7	—		—		—		64	7
1. FC Köln	2017–18	Bundesliga	2	0	1	0	—		—		3	0
Borussia Dortmund II	2019–20	Regionalliga West	24	8	—		—		—		24	8
Borussia Dortmund	2019–20	Bundesliga	0	0	0	0	0	0	0	0	0	0
SC Paderborn (loan)	2020–21	2. Bundesliga	34	13	3	1	—		—		37	14
VfB Stuttgart	2021–22	Bundesliga	25	3	1	0	—		—		26	3
VfB Stuttgart	2022–23	Bundesliga	33	5	5	0	—		2 (Note: Appearances in Bundesliga relegation play-offs)	0	40	5
VfB Stuttgart	2023–24	Bundesliga	34	8	4	1	—		—		38	9
VfB Stuttgart	2024–25	Bundesliga	33	2	5	1	7 (Note: Appearances in UEFA Champions League)	1	1 (Note: Appearance in DFL-/Franz Beckenbauer Supercup)	0	46	4
VfB Stuttgart	2025–26	Bundesliga	33	7	6	1	12 (Note: Appearances in UEFA Europa League)	0	1	0	52	8
VfB Stuttgart	2026–27	Bundesliga	7	1	2	0	4	0	—		13	1
VfB Stuttgart	Total		165	26	22	3	23	1	4	0	215	30
Career total			289	54	27	4	23	1	4	0	343	59

=== International ===
As of match played 24 September 2026

Appearances and goals by national team and year
National team	Year	Apps	Goals
Germany
Germany	2023	1	0
Germany	2024	7	0
Germany	2026	2	0
Total		10	0

== Honours ==
VfB Stuttgart

- DFB-Pokal: 2024–25
