= Atakan Karazor =

German-born Turkish footballer (born 1996)

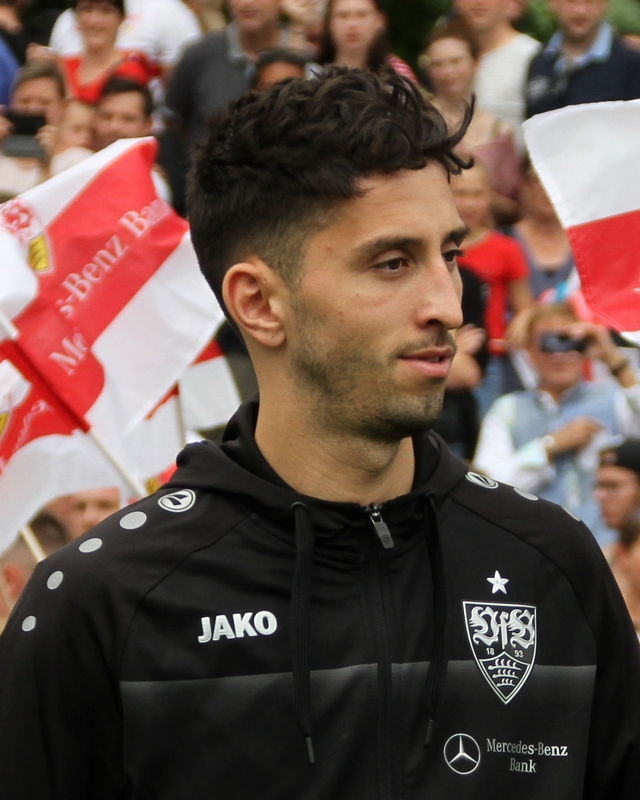
- Karazor with VfB Stuttgart in 2019

Personal information
- Full name: Atakan Karazor
- Date of birth: 13 October 1996 (age 30)
- Place of birth: Essen, Germany
- Height: 1.91 m (6 ft 3 in)
- Position: Defensive midfielder

Team information
- Current team: VfB Stuttgart
- Number: 16

Youth career
- –2012: Schwarz-Weiß Essen
- 2012–2015: VfL Bochum

Senior career*
Years	Team	Apps	(Gls)
2015–2017	Borussia Dortmund II	59	(1)
2017–2018	Holstein Kiel II	7	(1)
2017–2019	Holstein Kiel	26	(2)
2019–	VfB Stuttgart	192	(4)
2020	VfB Stuttgart II	2	(0)

International career^{‡}
2025–	Turkey	2	(0)
- * Club domestic league appearances and goals as of 31 October 2026 (UTC) ‡ National team caps and goals as of 18 November 2025 (UTC)

Atakan Karazor (born 13 October 1996) is a professional footballer who plays as a defensive midfielder for Bundesliga club VfB Stuttgart. Born in Germany, he plays for the Turkey national team.

He began his senior career at Borussia Dortmund II in the Regionalliga West before playing for Holstein Kiel for two seasons in the 2. Bundesliga. In 2019, he joined Stuttgart, where he won promotion to the Bundesliga in his first season.

== Club career ==
=== Early years ===
Born in Essen, North Rhine-Westphalia, Karazor played as a youth for local Schwarz-Weiß Essen and VfL Bochum.

In 2015, Karazor joined Borussia Dortmund, where he made his senior debut with the reserve team in the Regionalliga West, playing 59 games over two seasons and scoring on 4 October 2015 in a 2–0 win at 1. FC Köln II.

=== Holstein Kiel ===
In June 2017, Karazor left his native region and signed for Holstein Kiel in the 2. Bundesliga on a three-year deal. He injured his ankle ligaments in pre-season, recovering to make the squad in November, before making his professional debut on 23 January by starting in a 2–2 home draw with Union Berlin. He scored his first professional goals in 2018–19, equalising in a draw of the same score against SpVgg Greuther Fürth at the Holstein-Stadion on 17 February, and in a 1–1 draw away to FC Ingolstadt on 14 April.

=== VfB Stuttgart ===
In May 2019, it was announced Karazor would move to VfB Stuttgart on a contract until 2023. The transfer fee paid to Kiel was reported as about €1 million or €800,000. He played 23 games in his first season as the team won promotion to the Bundesliga as runners-up, and he scored twice on 21 June 2020 in a 6–0 win at 1. FC Nürnberg. Karazor made his top-flight debut on 3 October 2020 in a 1–1 draw at home to Bayer Leverkusen, as an 84th-minute substitute for Daniel Didavi. On 24 October the following year, he was sent off for the first time in his career in a game of the same score against Union Berlin at the Mercedes-Benz Arena for two yellow cards in the space of 35 seconds.

On 19 May 2022, Karazor extended his contract with VfB Stuttgart until June 2026. He returned to training and playing after his arrest and bail in Spain over the summer; the decision for the club to play him was endorsed by sporting director Sven Mislintat who cited the presumption of innocence. On 12 June 2024, Karazor and VfB Stuttgart extended his contract with the club until June 2028. In the summer of 2024, he became the new captain of VfB Stuttgart. He lost the captaincy to Deniz Undav in August 2026, ahead of the first matchday of the 2026–27 Bundesliga.

== International career ==
Karazor was eligible to represent Germany or Turkey at international level, and ended up choosing the latter.

On 14 March 2025, Karazor was called up by Vincenzo Montella to the Turkey national team for the 2024–25 UEFA Nations League promotion/relegation play-offs against Hungary. He made his debut for Turkey on 15 November 2025 against Bulgaria in the 2026 FIFA World Cup qualification.

== Personal life ==
Born in Germany, Karazor is of Turkish descent.

On 11 June 2022, VfB Stuttgart confirmed via the club's website that Karazor had been arrested while on holiday in Ibiza. He was remanded in custody while investigations continue; Spanish law permits a maximum of two years' pre-trial detention. On 21 July, he was released after paying €50,000 in bail and permitted to leave Spain, due to Germany's law enforcement cooperation with Spain and his professional career presenting a low risk of absconding to a third country.

== Career statistics ==
=== Club ===
As of match played 3 November 2026

Appearances and goals by club, season and competition
Club	Season	League			DFB-Pokal		Europe		Other		Total		Ref.
Club	Season	Division	Apps	Goals	Apps	Goals	Apps	Goals	Apps	Goals	Apps	Goals	Ref.
Borussia Dortmund II	2015–16	Regionalliga West	30	1	—		—		—		30	1	
Borussia Dortmund II	2016–17	Regionalliga West	29	0	—		—		—		29	0	
Borussia Dortmund II	Total		59	1	—		—		—		59	1	—
Holstein Kiel	2017–18	2. Bundesliga	4	0	0	0	—		—		4	0	
Holstein Kiel	2018–19	2. Bundesliga	22	2	2	0	—		—		24	2	
Holstein Kiel	Total		26	2	2	0	—		—		28	2	—
Holstein Kiel II	2017–18	Oberliga Schleswig-Holstein	5	0	—		—		—		5	0	
Holstein Kiel II	2018–19	Regionalliga Nord	2	1	—		—		—		2	1	
Holstein Kiel II	Total		7	1	—		—		—		7	1	—
VfB Stuttgart	2019–20	2. Bundesliga	23	2	2	0	—		—		25	2	
VfB Stuttgart	2020–21	Bundesliga	19	0	0	0	—		—		19	0	
VfB Stuttgart	2021–22	Bundesliga	24	0	1	0	—		—		25	0	
VfB Stuttgart	2022–23	Bundesliga	29	0	4	0	—		2 (Note: Appearances in Bundesliga relegation play-offs)	0	35	0	
VfB Stuttgart	2023–24	Bundesliga	33	0	4	0	—		—		37	0	
VfB Stuttgart	2024–25	Bundesliga	32	2	6	1	7 (Note: Appearances in UEFA Champions League)	0	1 (Note: Appearance in Franz Beckenbauer Supercup)	0	46	3	
VfB Stuttgart	2025–26	Bundesliga	28	0	5	2	10 (Note: Appearances in UEFA Europa League)	0	1	0	44	2	
VfB Stuttgart	2026–27	Bundesliga	4	0	1	0	2	0	—		7	0	
VfB Stuttgart	Total		192	4	23	3	19	0	4	0	238	7	—
VfB Stuttgart II	2020–21	Regionalliga Südwest	2	0	—		—		—		2	0	
Career total			286	8	25	3	19	0	4	0	334	11	—

=== International ===
As of match played 18 November 2025

Appearances and goals by national team and year
National team	Year	Apps	Goals
Turkey	2025	2	0
Total		2	0

== Honours ==
VfB Stuttgart

- DFB-Pokal: 2024–25
