= Jamie Leweling =

German footballer (born 2001)

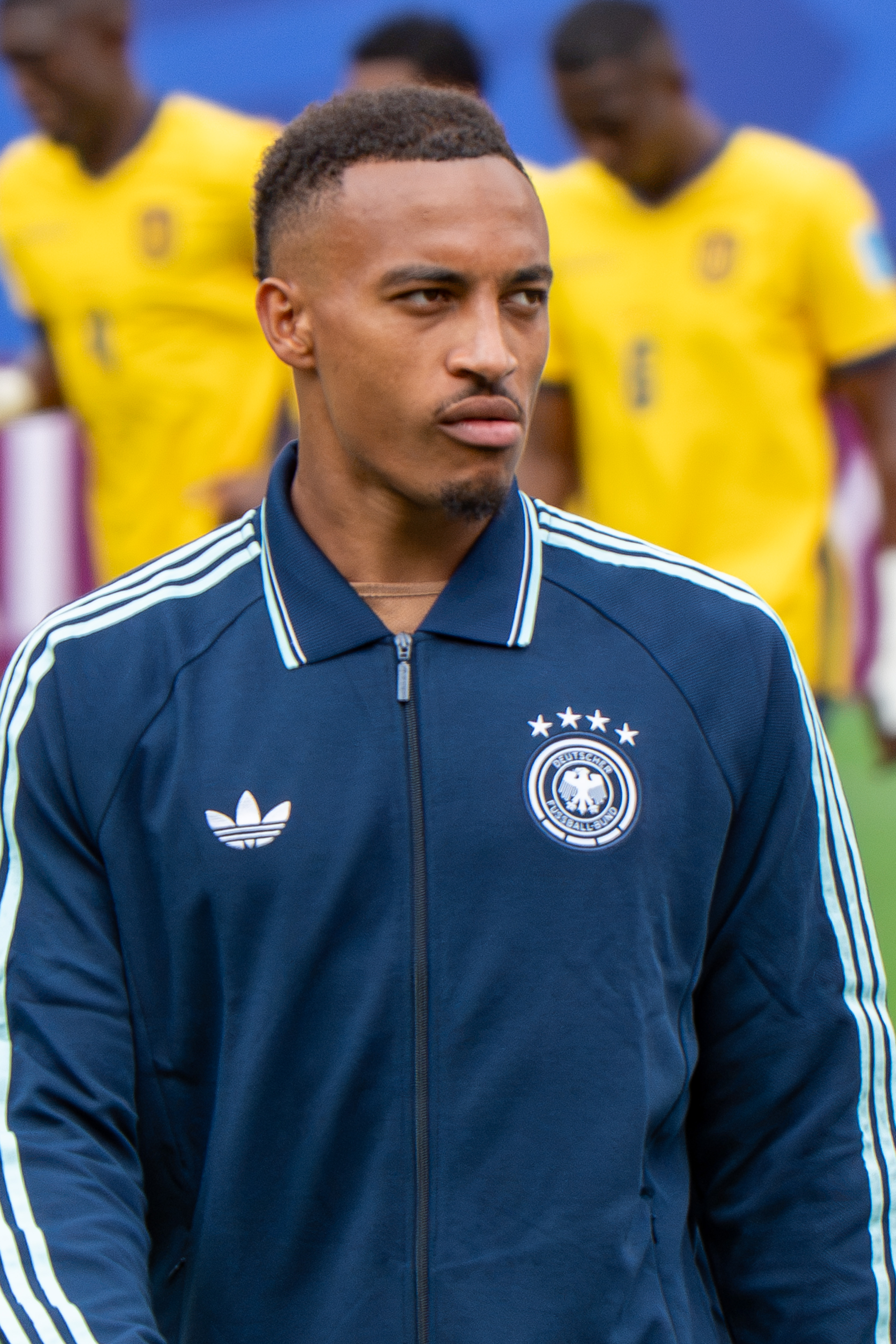
- Leweling with Germany in 2026

Personal information
- Full name: Jamie Jaleel Jeremy Leweling
- Date of birth: 26 February 2001 (age 25)
- Place of birth: Nuremberg, Germany
- Height: 1.84 m (6 ft 0 in)
- Positions: Winger; right wing-back

Team information
- Current team: VfB Stuttgart
- Number: 18

Youth career
- 2010–2012: 1. SC Feucht
- 2012–2017: 1. FC Nürnberg
- 2017–2020: Greuther Fürth

Senior career*
Years	Team	Apps	(Gls)
2019–2022	Greuther Fürth	79	(9)
2022–2024	Union Berlin	16	(1)
2023–2024	→ VfB Stuttgart (loan)	34	(4)
2024–	VfB Stuttgart	67	(10)

International career^{‡}
2019	Germany U19	3	(0)
2020	Germany U20	3	(1)
2021–2023	Germany U21	11	(1)
2024–	Germany	6	(1)
- * Club domestic league appearances and goals as of 17:30, 31 October 2026 (UTC) ‡ National team caps and goals as of 22:11, 20 June 2026 (UTC)

Jamie Jaleel Jeremy Leweling (born 26 February 2001) is a German professional footballer who plays as a Winger or right wing-back for Bundesliga club VfB Stuttgart and the Germany national team.

== Club career ==
=== Greuther Fürth ===
Leweling made his professional debut for Greuther Fürth in the 2. Bundesliga on 28 July 2019, coming on as a substitute in the 85th minute for Tobias Mohr in 2–0 home loss against Erzgebirge Aue. Later that year, on 7 December, he recorded his first goal and assist for the club in a 3–1 victory against Bochum.

Following the club's promotion to the Bundesliga, he scored five goals during the 2021–22 season, opening his account with a goal against VfB Stuttgart in a 5–1 loss in the season's opening match.

=== Union Berlin ===
On 17 May 2022, following Greuther Fürth's relegation from Bundesliga, it was confirmed that Leweling would join Bundesliga club Union Berlin for the 2022–23 season. On 21 January 2023, he scored his first goal for the club in a 3–1 league victory against Hoffenheim.

=== VfB Stuttgart ===
On 13 July 2023, Leweling moved to VfB Stuttgart on loan. On 27 January 2024, he scored his first goal in a 5–2 victory against RB Leipzig. On 19 May 2024, Leweling signed for Stuttgart permanently with a contract until June 2028. In December 2024, Leweling extended his contract with VfB Stuttgart until June 2029. On 21 January 2025, he scored his first Champions League brace in a 3–1 away victory against Slovan Bratislava.

== International career ==
Born in Germany, Leweling is of German, French, and Ghanaian descent. His mother is German, his father is Ghanaian. In addition to German, Leweling holds both Ghanaian and French citizenships. He was called up to the Ghana national team in October 2020, but he never made an appearance.

In October 2024, Leweling was selected by coach Julian Nagelsmann to represent Germany, replacing injured Jamal Musiala, for the UEFA Nations League matches against Bosnia and Herzegovina and the Netherlands. On 14 October, he made his debut whilst scoring the only goal in 1–0 victory against the latter opponent.

On 21 May 2026, he was selected in Germany’s 26-man squad for the 2026 FIFA World Cup.

== Career statistics ==
=== Club ===
As of match played 3 November 2026

Appearances and goals by club, season and competition
Club	Season	League			DFB-Pokal		Europe		Other		Total	
Club	Season	Division	Apps	Goals	Apps	Goals	Apps	Goals	Apps	Goals	Apps	Goals
Greuther Fürth	2019–20	2. Bundesliga	22	3	1	0	—		—		23	3
Greuther Fürth	2020–21	2. Bundesliga	24	1	3	0	—		—		27	1
Greuther Fürth	2021–22	Bundesliga	33	5	1	0	—		—		34	5
Greuther Fürth	Total		79	9	5	0	—		—		84	9
Union Berlin	2022–23	Bundesliga	16	1	2	0	7 (Note: Appearances in UEFA Europa League)	0	—		25	1
VfB Stuttgart (loan)	2023–24	Bundesliga	34	4	4	0	—		—		38	4
VfB Stuttgart	2024–25	Bundesliga	27	2	4	1	5 (Note: Appearances in UEFA Champions League)	2	1 (Note: Appearance in DFL-/Franz Beckenbauer Supercup)	0	37	5
VfB Stuttgart	2025–26	Bundesliga	32	7	6	0	11	3	1	1	50	11
VfB Stuttgart	2026–27	Bundesliga	8	1	1	0	4	1	—		13	2
VfB Stuttgart	Stuttgart total		101	14	15	1	20	6	2	1	138	22
Career total			196	24	22	1	27	6	2	1	247	32

=== International ===
As of match played 20 June 2026

Appearances and goals by national team and year
National team	Year	Apps	Goals
Germany	2024	1	1
Germany	2025	3	0
Germany	2026	2	0
Total		6	1

Germany score listed first, score column indicates score after each Leweling goal.

List of international goals scored by Jamie Leweling
No.	Date	Venue	Cap	Opponent	Score	Result	Competition
1	14 October 2024	Allianz Arena, Munich, Germany	1	Netherlands	1–0	1–0	2024–25 UEFA Nations League A

== Honours ==
VfB Stuttgart

- DFB-Pokal: 2024–25
