= Lorenz Assignon =

French footballer (born 2000)

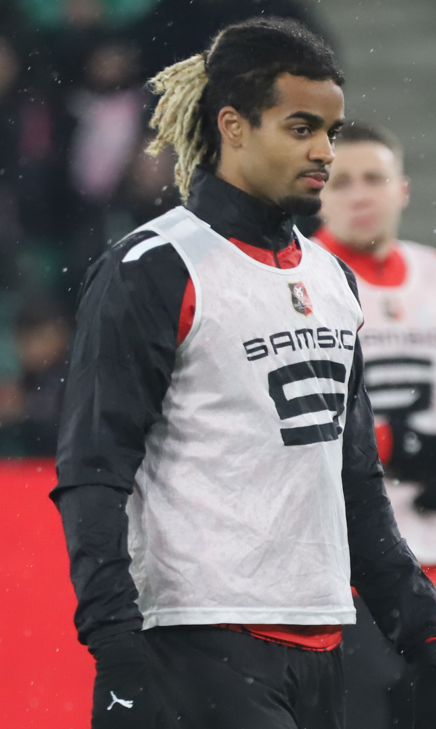
- Assignon with Rennes in 2025

Personal information
- Full name: Lorenz Assignon
- Date of birth: 22 June 2000 (age 26)
- Place of birth: Grasse, Alpes-Maritimes, France
- Height: 1.81 m (5 ft 11 in)
- Position: Right-back

Team information
- Current team: VfB Stuttgart
- Number: 22

Youth career
- Stade Poitevin
- –2015: Pôle Espoirs Châteauroux
- 2015–2019: Rennes

Senior career*
Years	Team	Apps	(Gls)
2019–2023	Rennes II	24	(3)
2020–2025	Rennes	78	(4)
2021	→ Bastia (loan)	13	(1)
2024	→ Burnley (loan)	15	(1)
2025–	VfB Stuttgart	26	(0)
- * Club domestic league appearances and goals as of 23 October 2026

Lorenz Assignon (born 22 June 2000) is a French professional footballer who plays as a right-back for German Bundesliga club VfB Stuttgart.

== Career ==
=== Rennes ===
On 3 March 2020, Assignon signed his first professional contract with Rennes. During the second half of the 2020–21 season, he was loaned to third-tier Bastia, where he helped the club win the Championnat National, contributing one goal in thirteen appearances.

Assignon made his professional debut for Rennes as a substitute in a 3–1 UEFA Europa Conference League win over Rosenborg on 26 August 2021. On 8 September 2022, he scored his first professional goal for Rennes, a last-minute winner in a 2–1 UEFA Europa League victory over AEK Larnaca. Sports newspaper L'Équipe described his goal as "Zlatan-esque".

==== Burnley (loan) ====
On 1 February 2024, Assignon was loaned out to English side Burnley until the end of the season with an option to buy. On 30 March 2024, Assignon gave away a penalty and got a red card after receiving his second booking for a foul on Mykhailo Mudryk, with the game against Chelsea ending in a 2-2 draw. After his second yellow card, Vincent Kompany was also sent off for protesting against the referee Darren England over awarding the home side the penalty. On 20 April 2024 he became just the second Burnley defender to both score and assist in a single Premier League game, in a 4-1 away win at Sheffield United. On 21 May 2024, Burnley said it was moving to make the loan permanent.

=== VfB Stuttgart ===
On 6 June 2025, Assignon signed a four-year contract with VfB Stuttgart in Germany.

== Personal life ==
Assignon is the son of Togolese former footballer Komlan Assignon.

== Career statistics ==
As of match played 3 November 2026

Appearances and goals by club, season and competition
Club	Season	League			National cup (Note: Includes Coupe de France, DFB-Pokal)		Europe		Other		Total	
Club	Season	Division	Apps	Goals	Apps	Goals	Apps	Goals	Apps	Goals	Apps	Goals
Rennes II	2018–19	CFA 2	2	0	—		—		—		2	0
Rennes II	2019–20	CFA 2	16	2	—		—		—		16	2
Rennes II	2020–21	CFA 2	3	0	—		—		—		3	0
Rennes II	2022–23	CFA	2	1	—		—		—		2	1
Rennes II	2023–24	CFA 2	1	0	—		—		—		1	0
Rennes II	Total		24	3	—		—		—		24	3
Rennes	2020–21	Ligue 1	0	0	0	0	0	0	—		0	0
Rennes	2021–22	Ligue 1	20	0	2	0	4 (Note: Appearances in UEFA Conference League)	0	—		26	0
Rennes	2022–23	Ligue 1	12	0	1	0	5 (Note: Appearances in UEFA Europa League)	1	—		18	1
Rennes	2023–24	Ligue 1	14	1	1	0	5	1	—		20	2
Rennes	2024–25	Ligue 1	32	3	2	1	—		—		34	4
Rennes	Total		78	4	6	1	14	2	—		98	7
Bastia (loan)	2020–21	Ligue 3	13	1	—		—		—		13	1
Burnley (loan)	2023–24	Premier League	15	1	—		—		—		15	1
VfB Stuttgart	2025–26	Bundesliga	24	0	3	0	9	1	1 (Note: Appearance in Franz Beckenbauer Supercup)	0	37	1
VfB Stuttgart	2026–27	Bundesliga	2	0	1	0	3 (Note: Appearances in UEFA Champions League)	0	—		6	0
VfB Stuttgart	Total		26	0	4	0	12	0	1	0	43	1
Career total			156	9	10	1	26	3	1	0	193	13

== Honours ==
Bastia

- Championnat National: 2020–21
