= Luca Jaquez =

Swiss footballer (born 2003)

Personal information
- Full name: Luca Antony Jaquez
- Date of birth: 2 June 2003 (age 23)
- Place of birth: Lucerne, Switzerland
- Height: 1.87 m (6 ft 2 in)
- Position: Centre-back

Team information
- Current team: VfB Stuttgart
- Number: 14

Youth career
- SC Obergeissenstein
- 2013–2022: Luzern

Senior career*
Years	Team	Apps	(Gls)
2021–2023	Luzern U21	31	(2)
2022–2025	Luzern	60	(3)
2025–	VfB Stuttgart	21	(0)

International career^{‡}
2017	Switzerland U15	2	(0)
2021	Switzerland U19	2	(0)
2022–2023	Switzerland U20	3	(0)
2024–	Switzerland U21	3	(0)
2025–	Switzerland	5	(0)
- * Club domestic league appearances and goals as of 7 November 2026 ‡ National team caps and goals as of 24 June 2026

Luca Antony Jaquez (born 2 June 2003) is a Swiss professional footballer who plays as a centre-back for German Bundesliga club VfB Stuttgart and the Switzerland national team.

== Club career ==
Jaquez is a youth product of SC Obergeissenstein, before moving to the youth academy of Luzern in 2013. He signed his first professional contract with Luzern on 27 January 2022 until 2025. He made his professional debut with Luzern in a 3–0 Swiss Super League loss to Basel on 30 January 2022. On 24 November 2022, he extended his contract with Luzern until 2026.

On 3 February 2025, Jaquez moved to German club VfB Stuttgart on a four-and-a-half-year contract.

== International career ==
Jaquez was born in Switzerland to a Dominican father and Swiss mother. He is a youth international for Switzerland, having played for the Switzerland U20s in 2022. He was called up to the senior Switzerland national team for a set of 2026 FIFA World Cup qualification – UEFA Group B matches in October 2025.

On 20 May 2026, Jaquez was selected in the 26-man squad for the 2026 FIFA World Cup.

== Career statistics ==
=== Club ===
As of match played 7 November 2026

Appearances and goals by club, season and competition
Club	Season	League			National cup (Note: Includes Swiss Cup, DFB-Pokal)		Europe		Other		Total	
Club	Season	Division	Apps	Goals	Apps	Goals	Apps	Goals	Apps	Goals	Apps	Goals
Luzern	2021–22	Swiss Super League	1	0	0	0	—		0	0	1	0
Luzern	2022–23	Swiss Super League	10	0	1	0	—		—		11	0
Luzern	2023–24	Swiss Super League	30	0	2	0	2 (Note: Appearances in UEFA Europa Conference League)	0	—		34	0
Luzern	2024–25	Swiss Super League	19	3	1	0	—		—		20	3
Luzern	Total		60	3	4	0	2	0	—		66	3
VfB Stuttgart	2024–25	Bundesliga	5	0	1	0	—		—		6	0
VfB Stuttgart	2025–26	Bundesliga	14	0	3	1	8 (Note: Appearances in UEFA Europa League)	0	1 (Note: Appearance in Franz Beckenbauer Supercup)	0	26	1
VfB Stuttgart	2026–27	Bundesliga	2	0	1	0	0	0	—		3	0
VfB Stuttgart	Total		21	0	5	1	8	0	1	0	35	1
Career total			81	3	9	1	10	0	1	0	101	4

=== International ===
As of match played 24 June 2026

Appearances and goals by national team and year
National team	Year	Apps	Goals
Switzerland	2025	1	0
Switzerland	2026	4	0
Total		5	0

== Honours ==
VfB Stuttgart

- DFB-Pokal: 2024–25
