= 2026–27 VfB Stuttgart season =

VfB Stuttgart
2026–27 season
- President: Dietmar Allgaier
- CEO: Alexander Wehrle
- Head coach: Sebastian Hoeneß
- Stadium: MHPArena
- Bundesliga: 8th
- DFB-Pokal: Round of 16
- UEFA Champions League: League phase
- Top goalscorer: League: Ermedin Demirović (5); All: Ermedin Demirović (9)
- Highest home attendance: 60,058
- Lowest home attendance: 57,500
- Average home league attendance: 59,259
- Biggest win: Hansa Rostock 0–4 VfB Stuttgart, DFB-Pokal, 21 August 2026
- Biggest defeat: Bayern Munich 5–1 VfB Stuttgart, Bundesliga, 28 August 2026
Home colours	Away colours	Third colours

The 2026–27 season is the 134th season in the history of VfB Stuttgart, and the club's seventh consecutive campaign in the Bundesliga. In addition to the domestic league, Stuttgart is participating in the DFB-Pokal and the UEFA Champions League.

== Players ==
=== First-team squad ===
As of 5 September 2026

Note: Flags indicate national team as defined under FIFA eligibility rules; some limited exceptions apply. Players may hold more than one non-FIFA nationality.

No.	Pos.	Nation	Player
1	GK	GER	Fabian Bredlow
2	DF	BEL	Ameen Al-Dakhil
3	DF	NED	Ramon Hendriks
4	DF	GER	Josha Vagnoman
6	MF	GER	Angelo Stiller
7	DF	GER	Maximilian Mittelstädt
8	FW	POR	Tiago Tomás
9	FW	BIH	Ermedin Demirović
10	MF	GER	Chris Führich
11	MF	MAR	Bilal El Khannouss
14	DF	SUI	Luca Jaquez
16	MF	TUR	Atakan Karazor
17	FW	GER	Dženan Pejčinović
18	FW	GER	Jamie Leweling
20	DF	SUI	Leonidas Stergiou

No.	Pos.	Nation	Player
21	MF	GER	Grischa Prömel
22	DF	FRA	Lorenz Assignon
23	DF	FRA	Dan-Axel Zagadou
24	DF	GER	Jeff Chabot
26	FW	GER	Deniz Undav (captain)
28	MF	DEN	Nikolas Nartey
29	DF	GER	Finn Jeltsch
31	FW	GER	Justin Diehl
33	GK	GER	Marius Funk
39	MF	GER	Ertuğrul Yiğit
41	GK	GER	Dennis Seimen
43	FW	GER	Jarzinho Malanga
44	FW	SVK	Leo Sauer
46	GK	GER	Stefan Drljača

=== Out on loan ===
Note: Flags indicate national team as defined under FIFA eligibility rules; some limited exceptions apply. Players may hold more than one non-FIFA nationality.

No.	Pos.	Nation	Player
—	GK	GER	Florian Hellstern (at Greuther Fürth until 30 June 2027)
—	MF	GER	Mirza Catovic (at Barcelona Atlètic until 30 June 2027)
—	MF	GER	Noah Darvich (at SV Elversberg until 30 June 2027)
—	MF	GER	Yannik Keitel (at FC Augsburg until 30 June 2027)

No.	Pos.	Nation	Player
—	MF	GER	Laurin Ulrich (at SC Paderborn until 30 June 2027)
—	FW	ECU	Jeremy Arévalo (at Estrela da Amadora until 30 June 2027)
—	FW	ALG	Badredine Bouanani (at Rangers until 30 June 2027)

== Transfers ==
=== In ===
Date	Pos.	Player	From	Type	Fee	Ref.
1 July 2026	MF	(Morocco) Bilal El Khannouss	(England) Leicester City	Transfer	€15,000,000	
1 July 2026	MF	(Germany) Grischa Prömel	(Germany) TSG Hoffenheim	Transfer	Free	
1 July 2026	GK	(Germany) Marius Funk	(Germany) Energie Cottbus	Transfer	Free	
1 July 2026	FW	(Netherlands) Tim van der Leij	(Netherlands) RKC Waalwijk	Transfer	€1,200,000	
29 July 2026	FW	(Slovakia) Leo Sauer	(Netherlands) Feyenoord	Transfer	€12,500,000	
10 August 2026	FW	(Germany) Dženan Pejčinović	(Germany) VfL Wolfsburg	Transfer	€25,000,000	

=== Loans in ===
Date	Pos.	Player	From	Type	Fee	Ref.
No incoming loans confirmed as of 16 August 2026.

=== Out ===
Date	Pos.	Player	To	Type	Fee	Ref.
1 July 2026	GK	(Germany) Alexander Nübel	(Germany) Bayern Munich	End of loan	—N/a	
1 July 2026	DF	(Germany) Pascal Stenzel	Unattached	End of contract	—N/a	
10 August 2026	MF	(Austria) Christopher Olivier	(Denmark) Brøndby IF	Transfer	€1,000,000	
17 August 2026	FW	(Serbia) Jovan Milošević	(Portugal) Braga	Transfer	€8,000,000	
1 September 2026	MF	(Spain) Chema Andrés	(England) Brighton & Hove Albion	Transfer	€23,000,000	
1 September 2026	MF	(Serbia) Lazar Jovanović	(Italy) Udinese	Transfer	€8,000,000	

=== Loans out ===
Date	Pos.	Player	Loaned to	Type	Fee	Ref.
1 July 2026	GK	(Germany) Florian Hellstern	(Germany) Greuther Fürth	Loan	Undisclosed	
1 July 2026	MF	(Germany) Noah Darvich	(Germany) SV Elversberg	Loan	Undisclosed	
1 July 2026	MF	(Germany) Yannik Keitel	(Germany) FC Augsburg	Loan	Undisclosed	
16 August 2026	MF	(Germany) Laurin Ulrich	(Germany) SC Paderborn	Loan	€600,000	
1 September 2026	FW	(Algeria) Badredine Bouanani	(Scotland) Rangers	Loan	Undisclosed	
5 September 2026	FW	(Ecuador) Jeremy Arévalo	(Portugal) Estrela da Amadora	Loan	Undisclosed	

== Pre-season and friendlies ==
19 July 2026 Friendly	TSG Balingen	0–7	VfB Stuttgart	Balingen, Germany
14:30 CEST (UTC+2)		Report	Milošević 5', 26'; Führich 41'; Tomás 45+4'; Jovanović 60', 80'; Malanga 90'	Stadium: Bizerba Arena

25 July 2026 Friendly	FSV Hollenbach	0–5	VfB Stuttgart	Hollenbach, Germany
15:00 CEST (UTC+2)		Report	Tomás 24'; Führich 42'; Mittelstädt 51'; Milošević 59'; Nartey 64'	Stadium: Jako Arena

29 July 2026 Friendly	Kickers Offenbach	1–8	VfB Stuttgart	Offenbach, Germany
18:45 CEST (UTC+2)	Olivier 6'; Führich 10'; Tomás 18'; Ulrich 45+1'; Jovanović 53', 76'; Spalt 62'; Milošević 89'	Report	Von Hagen 42'	Stadium: Stadion am Bieberer Berg

8 August 2026 Friendly	VfB Stuttgart	2–2	Paris FC	Beutelsbach, Germany
15:00 CEST (UTC+2)	Jovanović 15'; Zagadou 54'	Report	Koleosho 71', 90+15'	Stadium: Stadion Benzach

8 August 2026 Friendly	VfB Stuttgart	3–1	Everton	Stuttgart, Germany
17:00 CEST (UTC+2)	Nartey 16'; Hendriks 65'; Bouanani 90+1'	Report	Barry 71' (pen.)	Stadium: MHPArena

15 August 2026 Friendly	Fulham	1–0	VfB Stuttgart	London, England
16:00 BST (UTC+1)	Castagne 67'	Report		Stadium: Craven Cottage

25 September 2026 Friendly	VfB Stuttgart	3–0	1. FC Heidenheim	Beutelsbach, Germany
CEST (UTC+2)	Karazor 42'; Assignon 71'; Chabot 86'	Report		Stadium: Stadion Benzach

1 October 2026 Friendly	VfB Stuttgart	5-0	Greuther Fürth	Aspach, Germany
17:30 CEST (UTC+2)	Undav 15', 37'; Prömel 17'; van der Leij 77'; Leweling 86'	Report		Stadium: WIRmachenDRUCK Arena

== Competitions ==
=== Overall record ===
Competition	First match	Last match	Starting round	Final position	Record							
Competition	First match	Last match	Starting round	Final position	Pld	W	D	L	GF	GA	GD	Win %
Bundesliga	28 August 2026	22 May 2027	Matchday 1	TBD	10	4	1	5	15	15	+0	40.00
DFB-Pokal	21 August 2026	TBD	First round	TBD	2	2	0	0	5	0	+5	100.00
UEFA Champions League	9 September 2026	TBD	League phase	TBD	4	2	1	1	7	4	+3	50.00
Total					16	8	2	6	27	19	+8	50.00

Last updated: 21 November 2026
Source: Fotmob

=== Bundesliga ===
==== League table ====
Pos	Team	Pld	W	D	L	GF	GA	GD	Pts	Qualification or relegation
6	Werder Bremen	10	5	3	2	21	15	+6	18	Qualification for the Conference League play-off round
7	Eintracht Frankfurt	10	4	3	3	16	20	−4	15	
8	VfB Stuttgart	10	4	1	5	15	15	0	13	
9	SV Elversberg	10	4	1	5	17	19	−2	13	
10	FC Augsburg	10	3	3	4	23	21	+2	12	

Updated to match(es) played on 22 November 2026. Source: Bundesliga
Rules for classification: 1) Points; 2) Goal difference; 3) Goals scored; 4) Head-to-head aggregate results; 5) Head-to-head away goals scored; 6) Away goals scored; 7) Play-off at neutral site.
(Rules 4–6 only apply after all home-and-away matches have been played between the tied teams. Rule 7 only applies after the completion of the season.)

==== Results summary ====
Overall								Home						Away					
Pld	W	D	L	GF	GA	GD	Pts	W	D	L	GF	GA	GD	W	D	L	GF	GA	GD
10	4	1	5	15	15	0	13	2	0	2	7	5	+2	2	1	3	8	10	−2

Last updated: 22 November 2026.
Source: Bundesliga

==== Results by round ====
Round	1	2	3	4	5	6	7	8	9	10	11	12	13	14	15	16	17	18	19	20	21	22	23	24	25	26	27	28	29	30	31	32	33	34
Ground	A	H	A	H	A	A	H	A	H	A	H	A	H	A	H	A	H	H	A	H	A	H	H	A	H	A	H	A	H	A	H	A	H	A
Result	L	W	L	L	W	L	L	W	W	D																								
Position	18	10	14	15	11	13	15	11	8	8																								
Points	0	3	3	3	6	6	6	9	12	13																								

Updated to match(es) played on 22 November 2026. Source: Bundesliga
A = Away; H = Home; W = Win; D = Draw; L = Loss

==== Matches ====
28 August 2026 1	Bayern Munich	5–1	VfB Stuttgart	Munich
20:30 CEST (UTC+2)	Upamecano 21'; Olise 55'; Vagnoman 58' (o.g.); Kim (yellow card) 81'; Pavlović 82'; Díaz 90+2'	Report	Vagnoman 52'; Chabot (yellow card) 62'; Jeltsch (yellow card) 68'; Prömel (yellow card) 90+2'	Stadium: Allianz Arena; Attendance: 75,024; Referee: Sören Storks

4 September 2026 2	VfB Stuttgart	4–1	1. FC Köln	Stuttgart
20:30 CEST (UTC+2)	El Khannouss 39'; Mittelstädt (yellow card) 51'; Prömel 60'; Demirović 75'; Vagnoman 90'	Report	Simpson-Pusey (yellow card) 42'; Hendriks 81' (o.g.); Krauß (yellow card) 85'; Castro-Montes (yellow card) 86'	Stadium: MHPArena; Attendance: 60,058; Referee: Christian Dingert

12 September 2026 3	TSG Hoffenheim	2–1	VfB Stuttgart	Sinsheim
	Hložek 13', 67'; Burger (yellow card) 63'	Report	Mittelstadt 48'	Stadium: SNP Arena; Attendance: 30,150; Referee: Sven Jablonski

19 September 2026 4	VfB Stuttgart	0–1	Borussia Dortmund	Stuttgart
18:30 CEST (UTC+2)	Demirović (yellow card) 13'; Stiller (yellow card) 17'	Report	Schlotterbeck (yellow card) 32'; Veerman (yellow card) 47'; Gadou (yellow card) 57'; Beier 70'; Bellingham (yellow card) 81'; Ryerson (yellow card) 82'	Stadium: MHPArena; Attendance: 60,000; Referee: Tobias Stieler

10 October 2026 5	SC Paderborn	0–2	VfB Stuttgart	Paderborn
15:30	Pieringer (yellow card) 45'	Report	Chabot 25'; Führich 83'	Stadium: Home Deluxe Arena; Attendance: 15,000; Referee: Felix Zwayer

17 October 2026 6	Hamburger SV	1–0	VfB Stuttgart	Hamburg
15:30 CEST	Omari (yellow card) 54'; Capaldo (yellow card) 82'; Stange (yellow card) 85'; Muheim 88'	Report		Stadium: Volksparkstadion; Attendance: 57,000; Referee: Robert Hartmann

24 October 2026 7	VfB Stuttgart	2–3	Borussia Mönchengladbach	Stuttgart
20:30	Demirović 5', 83'; Sauer (yellow card) 44'; Karazor (yellow card) 45'	Report	Scally 38', (yellow card) 54'; Neuhaus (yellow card) 45+3'; Machino 51'; Uno (yellow card) 53'; Mohya 66'; Ullrich (yellow card) 79'	Stadium: MHPArena; Attendance: 60,000; Referee: Matthias Jöllenbeck

31 October 2026 8	Bayer Leverkusen	2–4	VfB Stuttgart	Leverkusen
15:30 CET (UTC+1)	Fernández (yellow card) 17'; Schick 28'; Medina (yellow card) 40'; García (yellow card) 40'; Maza (yellow card) 53', (goal) 79'	Report	Demirović 14', 65', (yellow card) 64'; Leweling 22'; Jaquez (yellow card) 40'; Chabot (yellow card) 40'; El Khannouss 51'; Karazor (yellow card) 58'	Stadium: BayArena; Attendance: 30,210; Referee: Benjamin Brand

7 November 2026 9	VfB Stuttgart	1–0	Werder Bremen	Stuttgart
16:30 CET (UTC+1)	Mittelstädt 7'	Report	Füllkrug (yellow card) 24'; Deman (yellow card) 45'; Grüll (yellow card) 53'	Stadium: MHPArena; Attendance: 60,000; Referee: Sören Storks

21 November 2026 10	Schalke 04	0-0	VfB Stuttgart	Gelsenkirchen
18:30 CET (UTC+1)		Report	Mittelstädt (yellow card) 65'	Stadium: Veltins-Arena; Attendance: 62,094; Referee: Daniel Siebert

28 November 2026 11	VfB Stuttgart	v	Eintracht Frankfurt	Stuttgart
				Stadium: MHPArena

4–6 December 2026 12	SV Elversberg	v	VfB Stuttgart	Elversberg
				Stadium: URSAPHARM-Arena an der Kaiserlinde

11–13 December 2026 13	VfB Stuttgart	v	Union Berlin	Stuttgart
				Stadium: MHPArena

18–20 December 2026 14	SC Freiburg	v	VfB Stuttgart	Freiburg
				Stadium: Europa-Park Stadion

8–10 January 2027 15	VfB Stuttgart	v	FC Augsburg	Stuttgart
				Stadium: MHPArena

12–14 January 2027 16	RB Leipzig	v	VfB Stuttgart	Leipzig
				Stadium: Red Bull Arena

15–17 January 2027 17	VfB Stuttgart	v	Mainz 05	Stuttgart
				Stadium: MHPArena

22–24 January 2027 18	VfB Stuttgart	v	Bayern Munich	Stuttgart
				Stadium: MHPArena

29–31 January 2027 19	1. FC Köln	v	VfB Stuttgart	Cologne
				Stadium: RheinEnergieSTADION

5–7 February 2027 20	VfB Stuttgart	v	TSG Hoffenheim	Stuttgart
				Stadium: MHPArena

12–14 February 2027 21	Borussia Dortmund	v	VfB Stuttgart	Dortmund
				Stadium: Signal Iduna Park

19–21 February 2027 22	VfB Stuttgart	v	SC Paderborn	Stuttgart
				Stadium: MHPArena

26–28 February 2027 23	VfB Stuttgart	v	Hamburger SV	Stuttgart
				Stadium: MHPArena

2–4 March 2027 24	Borussia Mönchengladbach	v	VfB Stuttgart	Mönchengladbach
				Stadium: Borussia-Park

5–7 March 2027 25	VfB Stuttgart	v	Bayer Leverkusen	Stuttgart
				Stadium: MHPArena

12–14 March 2027 26	Werder Bremen	v	VfB Stuttgart	Bremen
				Stadium: Weserstadion

19–21 March 2027 27	VfB Stuttgart	v	Schalke 04	Stuttgart
				Stadium: MHPArena

2–4 April 2027 28	Eintracht Frankfurt	v	VfB Stuttgart	Frankfurt
				Stadium: Deutsche Bank Park

9–11 April 2027 29	VfB Stuttgart	v	SV Elversberg	Stuttgart
				Stadium: MHPArena

16–18 April 2027 30	Union Berlin	v	VfB Stuttgart	Berlin
				Stadium: Stadion An der Alten Försterei

23–25 April 2027 31	VfB Stuttgart	v	SC Freiburg	Stuttgart
				Stadium: MHPArena

7–9 May 2027 32	FC Augsburg	v	VfB Stuttgart	Augsburg
				Stadium: WWK Arena

14–16 May 2027 33	VfB Stuttgart	v	RB Leipzig	Stuttgart
				Stadium: MHPArena

22 May 2027 34	Mainz 05	v	VfB Stuttgart	Mainz
15:30 CEST (UTC+2)				Stadium: Mewa Arena

=== DFB-Pokal ===
21 August 2026 First round	Hansa Rostock	0–4	VfB Stuttgart	Rostock
20:45 CEST (UTC+2)	Bohnert (yellow card) 33'	Report	Pejčinović 18', 37', 82'; Stiller (yellow card) 32'; Tomás 74'	Stadium: Ostseestadion; Attendance: 27,453; Referee: Sascha Stegemann

28 October 2026 Second round	SC Paderborn	0–1	VfB Stuttgart	Paderborn
18:00 CET (UTC+1)	Curda (red card) 37'; Obermair (yellow card) 85'	Report	Leweling (yellow card) 33'; Chabot (yellow card) 41'; Undav 90'	Stadium: Home Deluxe Arena; Referee: Florian Badstübner

1 December 2026 Round of 16	VfB Stuttgart	v	Dynamo Dresden	Stuttgart
CET (UTC+1)				Stadium: MHPArena

=== UEFA Champions League ===
==== League phase ====
The draw for the league phase was held on 27 August 2026.

Pos	Team	Pld	W	D	L	GF	GA	GD	Pts	Qualification
12	(Germany) Borussia Dortmund	4	3	0	1	7	5	+2	9	Advance to knockout phase play-offs (seeded)
13	(Germany) Bayern Munich	4	2	2	0	12	5	+7	8	Advance to knockout phase play-offs (seeded)
14	(Germany) VfB Stuttgart	4	2	1	1	7	4	+3	7	Advance to knockout phase play-offs (seeded)
15	(Italy) Inter Milan	4	2	0	2	8	6	+2	6	Advance to knockout phase play-offs (seeded)
16	(Austria) LASK	4	2	0	2	10	9	+1	6	Advance to knockout phase play-offs (seeded)

Updated to match(es) played on 4 November 2026. Source: UEFA
Rules for classification: League phase tiebreakers

Round	1	2	3	4	5	6	7	8
Ground	H	A	H	A	A	H	H	A
Result	W	W	D	L				
Position	6	4	6	14				
Points	3	6	7	7				

Updated to match(es) played on 3 November 2026. Source: UEFA
A = Away; H = Home; W = Win; D = Draw; L = Loss

9 September 2026 1	VfB Stuttgart (Germany)	3–1	(Norway) Viking	Stuttgart, Germany
18:45 CEST (UTC+2)	Demirović 20', 26', 32'	Report	Tripić 22'; Askildsen (yellow card) 42'; Christiansen (yellow card) 54'; Bell (yellow card) 59'	Stadium: MHP Arena; Attendance: 57,500; Referee: Nenad Minaković (Serbia)

14 October 2026 2	Slovan Bratislava (Slovakia)	0–3	(Germany) VfB Stuttgart	Bratislava, Slovakia
21:00 CEST (UTC+2)	Pokorný (yellow card) 86'	Report	Hendriks (yellow card) 12'; El Khannouss (yellow card) 26'; Undav 29'; Cruz 64' (o.g.); Vagnoman (yellow card) 77'; Demirović 90'	Stadium: Tehelné pole Attendance: 19,725; Referee: Irfan Peljto (Bosnia and Herzegovina)

20 October 2026 3	VfB Stuttgart (Germany)	1–1	(Spain) Atlético Madrid	Stuttgart, Germany
21:00 CEST (UTC+2)	Mittelstädt (yellow card) 17'; Leweling 36'	Report	Alvarez 47'; Hjulmand (red card) 64'	Stadium: MHPArena; Attendance: 58,000; Referee: Serdar Gözübüyük (Netherlands)

3 November 2026 4	Galatasaray (Turkey)	2–0	(Germany) VfB Stuttgart	Istanbul, Turkey
20:45 TRT (UTC+3)	Batrakov 12', 15'; Yılmaz (yellow card) 38'; Sallai (yellow card) 62'; Torreira (yellow card) 85'	Report	Karazor (yellow card) 2'; Undav (yellow card) 38'; Spalt (yellow card) 45+2'; Prömel (yellow card) 61'; Hendriks (yellow card) 79'	Stadium: Rams Park; Attendance: 45,162; Referee: Chris Kavanagh (England)

25 November 2026 5	Inter Milan (Italy)	v	(Germany) VfB Stuttgart	Milan, Italy
21:00 CET (UTC+1)		Report		Stadium: San Siro

9 December 2026 6	VfB Stuttgart (Germany)	v	(France) Lille	Stuttgart, Germany
21:00 CET (UTC+1)		Report		Stadium: MHPArena

19 January 2027 7	VfB Stuttgart (Germany)	v	(Belgium) Club Brugge	Stuttgart, Germany
21:00 CET (UTC+1)		Report		Stadium: MHPArena

27 January 2027 8	PSV Eindhoven (Netherlands)	v	(Germany) VfB Stuttgart	Eindhoven, Netherlands
21:00 CET (UTC+1)		Report		Stadium: Philips Stadion

== Statistics ==
=== Appearances and goals ===
As of 22 November 2026

No.	Pos	Nat	Player	Total		Bundesliga		DFB-Pokal		Champions League	
No.	Pos	Nat	Player	Apps	Goals	Apps	Goals	Apps	Goals	Apps	Goals
Goalkeepers
1	GK	(Germany) GER	Fabian Bredlow	9	0	4	0	2	0	3	0
33	GK	(Germany) GER	Marius Funk	0	0	0	0	0	0	0	0
41	GK	(Germany) GER	Dennis Seimen	7	0	6	0	0	0	1	0
46	GK	(Germany) GER	Stefan Drljača	0	0	0	0	0	0	0	0
Defenders
2	DF	(Belgium) BEL	Ameen Al-Dakhil	3	0	0+1	0	0+1	0	0+1	0
3	DF	(Netherlands) NED	Ramon Hendriks	14	0	8+1	0	1	0	3+1	0
4	DF	(Germany) GER	Josha Vagnoman	11	2	6+1	2	0+1	0	2+1	0
7	DF	(Germany) GER	Maximilian Mittelstädt	14	2	8+1	2	2	0	3	0
14	DF	(Switzerland) SUI	Luca Jaquez	3	0	2	0	0+1	0	0	0
20	DF	(Switzerland) SUI	Leonidas Stergiou	1	0	0+1	0	0	0	0	0
22	DF	(France) FRA	Lorenz Assignon	6	0	1+1	0	1	0	0+3	0
23	DF	(France) FRA	Dan-Axel Zagadou	0	0	0	0	0	0	0	0
24	DF	(Germany) GER	Jeff Chabot	16	1	9+1	1	2	0	4	0
29	DF	(Germany) GER	Finn Jeltsch	12	0	7+2	0	1	0	2	0
Midfielders
6	MF	(Germany) GER	Angelo Stiller	12	0	7	0	2	0	3	0
10	MF	(Germany) GER	Chris Führich	15	1	8+1	1	1+1	0	4	0
11	MF	(Morocco) MAR	Bilal El Khannouss	16	2	5+5	2	1+1	0	4	0
16	MF	(Turkey) TUR	Atakan Karazor	7	0	4	0	0+1	0	1+1	0
21	MF	(Germany) GER	Grischa Prömel	16	1	7+3	1	2	0	4	0
28	MF	(Denmark) DEN	Nikolas Nartey	5	0	0+3	0	1	0	0+1	0
35	MF	(Serbia) SRB	Mirza Ćatović	0	0	0	0	0	0	0	0
36	MF	(Germany) GER	Laurin Ulrich	0	0	0	0	0	0	0	0
56	MF	(Austria) AUT	Yanik Spalt	5	0	2+2	0	0	0	0+1	0
Forwards
8	FW	(Portugal) POR	Tiago Tomás	4	1	1+1	0	1	1	0+1	0
9	FW	(Bosnia and Herzegovina) BIH	Ermedin Demirović	15	9	7+2	5	1+1	0	2+2	4
17	FW	(Germany) GER	Dženan Pejčinović	15	3	4+5	0	1+1	3	1+3	0
18	FW	(Germany) GER	Jamie Leweling	15	2	5+5	1	1	0	3+1	1
25	FW	(Ecuador) ECU	Jeremy Arévalo	0	0	0	0	0	0	0	0
26	FW	(Germany) GER	Deniz Undav	16	2	8+2	0	2	1	4	1
34	FW	(Netherlands) NED	Tim van der Leij	0	0	0	0	0	0	0	0
44	FW	(Slovakia) SVK	Leo Sauer	9	0	1+5	0	0	0	0+3	0
45	FW	(Serbia) SRB	Lazar Jovanović	0	0	0	0	0	0	0	0
Players transferred/loaned out during the season
30	MF	(Spain) ESP	Chema Andrés	2	0	0+1	0	0+1	0	0	0

Last updated: 22 November 2026
Source: Competitions

=== Goalscorers ===
Rank	Pos.	No.	Nat.	Player	Bundesliga	DFB-Pokal	Champions League	Total
1	FW	9	(Bosnia and Herzegovina)	Ermedin Demirović	5	0	4	9
2	FW	17	(Germany)	Dženan Pejčinović	0	3	0	3
3	DF	4	(Germany)	Josha Vagnoman	2	0	0	2
3	FW	26	(Germany)	Deniz Undav	0	1	1	2
3	FW	11	(Algeria)	Bilal El Khannouss	2	0	0	2
3	MF	18	(Germany)	Jamie Leweling	1	0	1	2
3	DF	7	(Germany)	Maximilian Mittelstädt	2	0	0	2
4	FW	8	(Portugal)	Tiago Tomás	0	1	0	1
4	MF	21	(Germany)	Grischa Prömel	1	0	0	1
4	DF	7	(Germany)	Maximilian Mittelstädt	1	0	0	1
4	DF	24	(Germany)	Jeff Chabot	1	0	0	1
Own goals					0	0	1	1
Totals					15	5	7	29

Last updated: 8 November 2026.
Source: FotMob

=== Assists ===
The list is sorted by squad number when total assists are equal.

Rank	No.	Pos.	Nat.	Player	Bundesliga	DFB-Pokal	Champions League	Total
1	26	FW	(Germany)	Deniz Undav	1	2	2	5
2	6	MF	(Germany)	Angelo Stiller	2	0	2	4
3	4	DF	(Germany)	Josha Vagnoman	1	1	0	2
3	10	MF	(Germany)	Chris Führich	1	1	0	2
4	8	FW	(Portugal)	Tiago Tomás	0	1	0	1
4	7	DF	(Germany)	Maximilian Mittelstädt	1	0	0	1
4	29	DF	(Germany)	Finn Jeltsch	1	0	0	1
4	18	FW	(Germany)	Jamie Leweling	1	0	0	1
4	17	FW	(Germany)	Dženan Pejčinović	1	0	0	1
4	22	DF	(France)	Lorenz Assignon	0	0	1	1
4	21	MF	(Germany)	Grischa Prömel	1	0	0	1
Totals					10	5	5	20

Last updated: 8 November 2026.
Source: FotMob
