= 2023–24 SC Paderborn 07 season =

SC Paderborn 07
2023–24 season
- Head coach: Lukas Kwasniok
- Stadium: Home Deluxe Arena
- 2. Bundesliga: 7th
- DFB-Pokal: Round of 16
- Top goalscorer: League: Adriano Grimaldi (9); All: Filip Bilbija; Adriano Grimaldi (9 each)
- Average home league attendance: 13,128

The 2023–24 SC Paderborn 07 season was the club's 117th season in existence and their fourth consecutive season in the 2. Bundesliga. They also competed in the DFB-Pokal.

== Players ==
=== Current squad ===
As of 24 January 2024

Note: Flags indicate national team as defined under FIFA eligibility rules; some limited exceptions apply. Players may hold more than one non-FIFA nationality.

No.	Pos.	Nation	Player
1	GK	NED	Pelle Boevink
4	DF	GER	Calvin Brackelmann
6	MF	GER	Marco Schuster
7	FW	GER	Filip Bilbija
8	MF	GER	David Kinsombi
10	FW	NED	Koen Kostons
11	FW	GER	Sirlord Conteh
12	GK	GER	Florian Pruhs
13	MF	GER	Robert Leipertz
16	DF	MKD	Visar Musliu
17	DF	GER	Laurin Curda
19	MF	GER	Kimberly Ezekwem (on loan from SC Freiburg)
20	DF	GER	Justus Henke
21	GK	GER	Jannik Huth (captain)

No.	Pos.	Nation	Player
22	MF	GER	Mattes Hansen
23	DF	GER	Raphael Obermair
24	DF	GER	Jannis Heuer
25	DF	GER	Jesse Tugbenyo
26	MF	GER	Sebastian Klaas
27	MF	GER	Kai Klefisch
29	FW	GER	Ilyas Ansah
31	DF	GER	Maximilian Rohr
32	DF	GER	Aaron Zehnter
33	DF	GER	Marcel Hoffmeier
34	DF	GER	Dawyn-Paul Donner
35	GK	GER	Arne Schulz
36	FW	GER	Felix Platte
39	FW	GER	Adriano Grimaldi

=== Out on loan ===
Note: Flags indicate national team as defined under FIFA eligibility rules; some limited exceptions apply. Players may hold more than one non-FIFA nationality.

No. / Pos. / Nation / Player; — / DF / SUI / Jasper van der Werff (at Hansa Rostock until 30 June 2024)	No. / Pos. / Nation / Player; — / MF / GER / Niclas Nadj (at SC Verl until 30 June 2024)

== Competitions ==
=== Overall record ===
Competition	First match	Last match	Starting round	Final position	Record							
Competition	First match	Last match	Starting round	Final position	Pld	W	D	L	GF	GA	GD	Win %
2. Bundesliga	29 July 2023	19 May 2024	Matchday 1		22	10	4	8	34	37	−3	45.45
DFB-Pokal	13 August 2023	6 December 2023	First round	Round of 16	3	2	0	1	11	4	+7	66.67
Total					25	12	4	9	45	41	+4	48.00

Last updated: 17 February 2024
Source: Soccerway

=== 2. Bundesliga ===
==== League table ====
Pos	Team	Pld	W	D	L	GF	GA	GD	Pts
5	Karlsruher SC	34	15	10	9	68	48	+20	55
6	Hannover 96	34	13	13	8	59	44	+15	52
7	SC Paderborn	34	15	7	12	54	54	0	52
8	Greuther Fürth	34	14	8	12	50	49	+1	50
9	Hertha BSC	34	13	9	12	69	59	+10	48

Source: DFB
Rules for classification: 1) Points; 2) Goal difference; 3) Goals scored; 4) Head-to-head results; 5) Head-to-head away goals scored; 6) Away goals scored; 7) Play-off.
(Rules 4–6 only apply after home and away matches have been played between the tied teams.)

==== Results summary ====
Overall								Home						Away					
Pld	W	D	L	GF	GA	GD	Pts	W	D	L	GF	GA	GD	W	D	L	GF	GA	GD
22	10	4	8	34	37	−3	34	5	2	4	18	18	0	5	2	4	16	19	−3

Last updated: 17 February 2024.
Source: DFB

==== Results by round ====
Round	1	2	3	4	5	6	7	8	9	10	11	12	13	14	15	16	17	18	19	20	21	22	23	24
Ground	A	H	A	H	A	H	A	H	A	H	A	A	H	A	H	A	H	H	A	H	A	H	A	H
Result	L	D	W	L	L	W	D	W	W	D	L	W	L	L	W	W	W	L	D	W	W	L	W	
Position	18	15	12	13	16	14	15	10	7	8	12	9	11	12	10	9	6	6	7	7	6	6	6	

Updated to match(es) played on 23 February 2024. Source: DFB
A = Away; H = Home; W = Win; D = Draw; L = Loss

==== Matches ====
The league fixtures were unveiled on 30 June 2023.

30 July 2023 1	SpVgg Greuther Fürth	5–0	SC Paderborn	Fürth
13:30 UTC+2	Hrgota 35', 45+3'; Lemperle 43'; Sieb 65'; Michalski 77'	Report		Stadium: Sportpark Ronhof Thomas Sommer; Attendance: 10,547; Referee: Richard Hempel

4 August 2023 2	SC Paderborn	1–1	VfL Osnabrück	Paderborn
				Stadium: Home Deluxe Arena

19 August 2023 3	Fortuna Düsseldorf	1–2	SC Paderborn	Düsseldorf
13:00 CEST (UTC+2)	De Wijs 57'	Report	Muslija 5'; Conteh 59'	Stadium: Merkur Spiel-Arena; Attendance: 30,312; Referee: Robert Hartmann

25 August 2023 4	SC Paderborn	1–2	1. FC Kaiserslautern	Paderborn
18:30 UTC+2	Muslija 73'	Report	Ritter 59'; Ache 65'	Stadium: Home Deluxe Arena; Attendance: 13,475; Referee: Robin Braun

2 September 2023 5	Holstein Kiel	2–1	SC Paderborn	Kiel
13:00 UTC+2	Rothe 31'; Skrzybski 61'	Report	Leipertz 12'	Stadium: Holstein-Stadion; Attendance: 11,454; Referee: Wolfgang Haslberger

15 September 2023 6	SC Paderborn	2–1	SV Wehen Wiesbaden	Paderborn

22 September 2023 7	1. FC Magdeburg	1–1	SC Paderborn	Magdeburg

29 September 2023 8	SC Paderborn	3–1	FC Schalke 04	Paderborn

8 October 2023 9	Eintracht Braunschweig	1–3	SC Paderborn	Braunschweig

21 October 2023 10	SC Paderborn	2–2	FC St. Pauli	Paderborn

28 October 2023 11	Hertha BSC	3–1	SC Paderborn	Berlin

5 November 2023 12	Karlsruher SC	0–3	SC Paderborn	Karlsruhe

11 November 2023 13	SC Paderborn	1–3	1. FC Nürnberg	Paderborn

25 November 2023 14	SV Elversberg	4–1	SC Paderborn	Elversberg

3 December 2023 15	SC Paderborn	1–0	Hannover 96	Paderborn
				Stadium: Home Deluxe Arena

9 December 2023 16	Hamburger SV	1–2	SC Paderborn	Hamburg
13:00	Bénes 11', (yellow card) 86'; Muheim (red card) 78'; Heyer (yellow card) 90+5'		Bilbija 21', (red card) 69'; Ansah 62'; Boevenik (yellow card) 85'	Stadium: Volksparkstadion; Attendance: 52,244; Referee: Christian Dingert

15 December 2023 17	SC Paderborn	3–0	Hansa Rostock	Paderborn
				Stadium: Home Deluxe Arena

21 January 2024 18	SC Paderborn	0–1	Greuther Fürth	Paderborn
13:30			Sieb 33'	Stadium: Home Deluxe Arena; Attendance: 10,975; Referee: Max Burda

27 January 2024 19	VfL Osnabrück	0–0	SC Paderborn	Osnabrück
13:00 UTC+1		Report		Stadium: Stadion an der Bremer Brücke; Attendance: 15,741; Referee: Michael Bacher

4 February 2024 20	SC Paderborn	4–3	Fortuna Düsseldorf	Paderborn
13:30 UTC+1		Report		Stadium: Home Deluxe Arena; Attendance: 12,852; Referee: Tobias Welz

10 February 2024 21	1. FC Kaiserslautern	1–2	SC Paderborn	Kaiserslautern
20:30 UTC+1		Report		Stadium: Fritz-Walter-Stadion; Attendance: 40,000; Referee: Martin Petersen

17 February 2024 22	SC Paderborn	0–4	Holstein Kiel	Paderborn
13:00 UTC+1	Ens (red card) 90+1'	Report	Porath 16'; Skrzybski 33'; Schulz 52'; Niehoff 90+10'	Stadium: Home Deluxe Arena; Attendance: 12,000; Referee: Patrick Alt

23 February 2024 23	Wehen Wiesbaden	1–2	SC Paderborn	Wiesbaden
18:30 UTC+1	Kovačević 30'	Report	Kostons 39'; Bilbija 82'	Stadium: Brita-Arena; Attendance: 6,119; Referee: Florian Lechner

3 March 2024 24	SC Paderborn	0–0	1. FC Magdeburg	Paderborn
13:30 UTC+1		Report		Stadium: Home Deluxe Arena; Attendance: 13,566; Referee: Nicolas Winter

9 March 2024 25	FC Schalke 04	3–3	SC Paderborn	Gelsenkirchen
13:00 UTC+1	Karaman 32' Lasme 50' Topp 90+2'	Report	Zehnter 60' Kinsombi 78' Klaas 86'	Stadium: Veltins Arena; Attendance: 61,475; Referee: Robert Kampka

15 March 2024 26	SC Paderborn	1–2	Eintracht Braunschweig	Paderborn
18:30 UTC+1	Grimaldi 61'	Report	Kurucay 59' Philippe 80'	Stadium: Home Deluxe Arena; Attendance: 14,093; Referee: Daniel Siebert

31 March 2024 27	FC St. Pauli	2–1	SC Paderborn	Hamburg

5 April 2024 28	SC Paderborn	2–3	Hertha BSC	Paderborn

13 April 2024 29	SC Paderborn	1–1	Karlsruher SC	Paderborn

19 April 2024 30	1. FC Nürnberg	0–2	SC Paderborn	Nürnberg

27 April 2024 31	SC Paderborn	3–1	SV Elversberg	Paderborn

5 May 2024 32	Hannover 96	3–2	SC Paderborn	Hannover

10 May 2024 33	SC Paderborn	1–0	Hamburger SV	Paderborn

19 May 2024 34	FC Hansa Rostock	1–2	SC Paderborn	Rostock

=== DFB-Pokal ===
13 August 2023 First round	Energie Cottbus	0–7	SC Paderborn	Cottbus
18:00		Report	Pelivan 4' (pen.); Musliu 11'; Bilbija 20', 51'; Muslija 64'; Klaas 83'; Hansen 85'	Stadium: Stadion der Freundschaft; Attendance: 12,469; Referee: Robert Schröder

1 November 2023 Second round	SC Freiburg	1–3	SC Paderborn	Freiburg
18:00 CET (UTC+1)	Gulde (yellow card) 32'; Eggestein 69'	Report	Bilbija 4', 56', (yellow card) 82'; Muslija (yellow card) 18', (goal) 33'; Conteh (yellow card) 45+3'; Obermair (yellow card) 64'; Leipertz (yellow card) 73'; Boevink (yellow card) 77'; Nadj (yellow card) 90+7'	Stadium: Europa-Park Stadion; Attendance: 31,500; Referee: Christian Dingert

6 December 2023 Round of 16	Bayer Leverkusen	3–1	SC Paderborn	Leverkusen
18:00 CET (UTC+1)	Boniface 12'; Palacios 28'; Schick 87'	Report	Bilbija (yellow card) 44'; Klaas 83'; Kinsombi (yellow card) 85'	Stadium: BayArena; Attendance: 29,249; Referee: Tobias Stieler
