= Sebastian Klaas =

German footballer

Personal information
- Full name: Sebastian Reinhard Klaas
- Date of birth: 30 June 1998 (age 28)
- Place of birth: Ibbenbüren, Germany
- Height: 1.78 m (5 ft 10 in)
- Position: Midfielder

Team information
- Current team: SC Paderborn
- Number: 26

Youth career
- VfL Osnabrück

Senior career*
| Years | Team | Apps | (Gls) |
| 2016–2017 | VfL Osnabrück II | 2 | (0) |
| 2017–2022 | VfL Osnabrück | 66 | (11) |
| 2022– | SC Paderborn | 82 | (10) |

International career^{‡}
| 2017 | Germany U19 | 1 | (0) |
- * Club domestic league appearances and goals as of 18 May 2026 ‡ National team caps and goals as of 14:41, 13 May 2017 (UTC)

Sebastian Reinhard Klaas (born 30 June 1998) is a German professional footballer who plays as a midfielder for Bundesliga club SC Paderborn.

== Club career ==
On 12 May 2022, Klaas signed with SC Paderborn.

== Career statistics ==
As of match played 25 May 2026

Appearances and goals by club, season and competition
| Club | Season | League | | | DFB-Pokal | | Other | | Total | |
| Club | Season | Division | Apps | Goals | Apps | Goals | Apps | Goals | Apps | Goals |
|---|---|---|---|---|---|---|---|---|---|---|
| VfL Osnabrück II | 2016–17 | Oberliga Niedersachsen | 2 | 0 | — | | – | | 2 | 0 |
| VfL Osnabrück | 2016–17 | 3. Liga | 1 | 0 | — | | 1 (Note: Appearance in Lower Saxony Cup) | 0 | 2 | 0 |
| VfL Osnabrück | 2017–18 | 3. Liga | 15 | 1 | 1 | 0 | 1 | 0 | 17 | 1 |
| VfL Osnabrück | 2018–19 | 3. Liga | 4 | 1 | 0 | 0 | 1 | 0 | 5 | 1 |
| VfL Osnabrück | 2019–20 | 2. Bundesliga | 8 | 0 | 0 | 0 | — | | 8 | 0 |
| VfL Osnabrück | 2020–21 | 2. Bundesliga | 2 | 0 | 1 | 1 | 0 | 0 | 3 | 1 |
| VfL Osnabrück | 2021–22 | 2. Bundesliga | 36 | 9 | 2 | 1 | — | | 38 | 10 |
| VfL Osnabrück | Total | | 66 | 11 | 4 | 1 | — | | 70 | 12 |
| SC Paderborn | 2022–23 | 2. Bundesliga | 5 | 0 | 0 | 0 | — | | 5 | 0 |
| SC Paderborn | 2023–24 | 2. Bundesliga | 32 | 3 | 3 | 2 | — | | 35 | 5 |
| SC Paderborn | 2024–25 | 2. Bundesliga | 19 | 2 | 1 | 0 | — | | 20 | 2 |
| SC Paderborn | 2025–26 | 2. Bundesliga | 26 | 5 | 1 | 0 | 2 (Note: Appearances in 2. Bundesliga promotion play-offs) | 0 | 29 | 5 |
| SC Paderborn | 2026–27 | Bundesliga | 0 | 0 | 0 | 0 | — | | 0 | 0 |
| SC Paderborn | Total | | 82 | 10 | 5 | 0 | 2 | 0 | 89 | 10 |
| Career total | | | 150 | 21 | 9 | 4 | 5 | 0 | 164 | 25 |
