= Tjark Scheller =

German footballer

Personal information
- Full name: Tjark Lasse Scheller
- Date of birth: 12 January 2002 (age 24)
- Place of birth: Rendsburg, Germany
- Height: 1.92 m (6 ft 4 in)
- Position: Centre-back

Team information
- Current team: SC Paderborn
- Number: 25

Youth career
- TSV Kropp
- 2016–2019: Holstein Kiel
- 2019–2021: Schalke 04

Senior career*
Years	Team	Apps	(Gls)
2021–2023	Schalke 04 II	31	(0)
2023–2024	FC St. Pauli II	35	(1)
2024	FC St. Pauli	2	(0)
2024–	SC Paderborn	70	(3)

International career
2017–2018	Germany U16	2	(0)
- * Club domestic league appearances and goals as of 17:30, 31 October 2026 (UTC)

Tjark Lasse Scheller (born 12 January 2002) is a German professional footballer who plays as a centre-back for Bundesliga club SC Paderborn.

== Club career ==
Scheller is a product of the youth academies of the German clubs TSV Kropp and Holstein Kiel, before moving to Schalke 04 on 2 August 2019. On 13 January 2023, he transferred to FC St. Pauli where he was assigned to their reserves. He made a couple of appearances with the St. Pauli as they achieved promotion to the Bundesliga. On 10 April 2024, he moved to SC Paderborn on a free-transfer. For the 2025–26 season, he again achieved promotion, this time with Paderborn.

== Career statistics ==
As of match played 31 October 2026

Appearances and goals by club, season and competition
Club	Season	League			DFB-Pokal		Europe		Other		Total	
Club	Season	Division	Apps	Goals	Apps	Goals	Apps	Goals	Apps	Goals	Apps	Goals
Schalke 04 II	2020–21	Regionalliga West	1	0	—		—		—		1	0
Schalke 04 II	2021–22	Regionalliga West	27	0	—		—		—		27	0
Schalke 04 II	2022–23	Regionalliga West	3	0	—		—		—		3	0
Schalke 04 II	Total		31	0	—		—		—		31	0
FC St. Pauli II	2022–23	Regionalliga Nord	15	1	—		—		—		15	1
FC St. Pauli II	2023–24	Regionalliga Nord	20	0	—		—		—		20	0
FC St. Pauli II	Total		35	1	—		—		—		35	1
FC St. Pauli	2023–24	2. Bundesliga	2	0	0	0	—		—		2	0
SC Paderborn	2024–25	2. Bundesliga	30	1	1	0	—		—		31	1
SC Paderborn	2025–26	2. Bundesliga	32	2	2	0	—		2 (Note: Appearances in 2. Bundesliga promotion play-offs)	0	36	2
SC Paderborn	2026–27	Bundesliga	8	0	2	0	—		—		10	0
SC Paderborn	Total		70	3	5	0	—		2	0	77	3
Career total			138	4	5	0	0	0	2	0	145	4

== Honours ==
FC St. Pauli

- 2. Bundesliga: 2023–24
