= 2023–24 2. Bundesliga =

2. Bundesliga
- Season: 2023–24
- Dates: 28 July 2023 – 19 May 2024
- Champions: FC St. Pauli
- Promoted: FC St. Pauli; Holstein Kiel
- Relegated: Wehen Wiesbaden (via play-off); Hansa Rostock; VfL Osnabrück
- Matches: 306
- Goals: 947 (3.09 per match)
- Top goalscorer: Robert Glatzel; Haris Tabaković; Christos Tzolis (22 goals each)
- Biggest home win: Hannover 7–0 Osnabrück; Karlsruhe 7–0 Magdeburg
- Biggest away win: Elversberg 0–5 Düsseldorf; Nürnberg 0–5 Düsseldorf
- Highest scoring: Magdeburg 6–4 Hertha
- Longest winning run: 6 games Düsseldorf; Kiel
- Longest unbeaten run: 20 games St. Pauli
- Longest winless run: 15 games Osnabrück
- Longest losing run: 7 games Kaiserslautern
- Highest attendance: 69,156; Hertha v Schalke
- Lowest attendance: 6,119; Wiesbaden v Paderborn
- Attendance: 8,811,550 (28,796 per match)

The 2023–24 2. Bundesliga was the 50th season of the 2. Bundesliga. It began on 28 July 2023 and concluded on 28 May 2024.

The fixtures were announced on 30 June 2023.

== Teams ==
Locations of the 2023–24 2. Bundesliga teams

=== Team changes ===
Promoted from 2022–23 3. Liga	Relegated from 2022–23 Bundesliga	Promoted to 2023–24 Bundesliga	Relegated to 2023–24 3. Liga
SV Elversberg; VfL Osnabrück; Wehen Wiesbaden	Schalke 04; Hertha BSC	1. FC Heidenheim; Darmstadt 98	Arminia Bielefeld; Jahn Regensburg; SV Sandhausen

SV Elversberg played in the 2. Bundesliga for the first time in the club's history, VfL Osnabrück returned to the 2. Bundesliga after a two-season spell in the third tier and Wehen Wiesbaden returned after a three-season spell in the third tier.

=== Stadiums and locations ===
Team	Location	Stadium	Capacity
Eintracht Braunschweig	Braunschweig	Eintracht-Stadion	23,325
Hertha BSC	Berlin	Olympiastadion	74,649
Fortuna Düsseldorf	Düsseldorf	Merkur Spiel-Arena	54,600
SV Elversberg	Spiesen-Elversberg	Waldstadion an der Kaiserlinde	10,000
Greuther Fürth	Fürth	Sportpark Ronhof Thomas Sommer	16,626
Hamburger SV	Hamburg	Volksparkstadion	57,000
Hannover 96	Hanover	Heinz von Heiden Arena	49,000
1. FC Kaiserslautern	Kaiserslautern	Fritz-Walter-Stadion	49,327
Karlsruher SC	Karlsruhe	BBBank Wildpark	34,302
Holstein Kiel	Kiel	Holstein-Stadion	15,034
1. FC Magdeburg	Magdeburg	MDCC-Arena	30,098
1. FC Nürnberg	Nuremberg	Max-Morlock-Stadion	49,923
VfL Osnabrück	Osnabrück	Stadion an der Bremer Brücke	16,667
SC Paderborn	Paderborn	Home Deluxe Arena	15,000
Hansa Rostock	Rostock	Ostseestadion	29,000
Schalke 04	Gelsenkirchen	Veltins-Arena	62,271
FC St. Pauli	Hamburg	Millerntor-Stadion	29,546
Wehen Wiesbaden	Wiesbaden	BRITA-Arena	12,250

=== Personnel and kits ===
Team	Manager	Captain	Kit manufacturer	Shirt sponsor	
Team	Manager	Captain	Kit manufacturer	Front	Sleeve
Eintracht Braunschweig	(Germany) Daniel Scherning	(Germany) Jannis Nikolaou	Puma	Kosatec Computer	Jochen Staake Stiftung
Hertha BSC	(Hungary) Pál Dárdai	(Germany) Toni Leistner	Nike	CrazyBuzzer	CG Elementum
Fortuna Düsseldorf	(Germany) Daniel Thioune	(Germany) André Hoffmann	Adidas	Targobank	Metro Chef
SV Elversberg	(Germany) Horst Steffen	(Germany) Kevin Conrad	Nike	HYLO	Pure Steel+
Greuther Fürth	(Germany) Alexander Zorniger	(Sweden) Branimir Hrgota	Puma	Hofmann Personal	Signia
Hamburger SV	(Germany) Steffen Baumgart	(Germany) Sebastian Schonlau	Adidas	HanseMerkur	Popp Feinkost
Hannover 96	(Germany) Stefan Leitl	(Germany) Ron-Robert Zieler	Macron	BRAINHOUSE247/ÜSTRA (April 2024 onwards)	Xylem
1. FC Kaiserslautern	(Germany) Friedhelm Funkel	(Germany) Jean Zimmer	Nike	Allgäuer Latschenkiefer	Lotto Rheinland-Pfalz
Karlsruher SC	(Germany) Christian Eichner	(Germany) Jérôme Gondorf	Macron	CG Elementum	Schauinsland-Reisen
Holstein Kiel	(Germany) Marcel Rapp	(Germany) Philipp Sander	Puma	Famila	Lotto Schleswig-Holstein
1. FC Magdeburg	(Germany) Christian Titz	(Germany) Amara Condé	Hummel	Humanas	SWM Magdeburg
1. FC Nürnberg	(Germany) Cristian Fiél	(Germany) Enrico Valentini	Adidas	Nürnberger Versicherung	Helmsauer
VfL Osnabrück	(Germany) Uwe Koschinat	(Germany) Timo Beermann	Puma	SO-TECH	JOPA
SC Paderborn	(Poland) Lukas Kwasniok	(Germany) Jannik Huth	Saller	Four 20 Pharma	Personalco
Hansa Rostock	(Bosnia and Herzegovina) Mersad Selimbegović	(Germany) Markus Kolke	Mizuno	28 Black	APEX Group
Schalke 04	(Belgium) Karel Geraerts	(Germany) Simon Terodde	Adidas	Veltins	hülsta
FC St. Pauli	(Germany) Fabian Hürzeler	(Australia) Jackson Irvine	DIIY	Congstar	Astra Brauerei
Wehen Wiesbaden	(Germany) Nils Döring	(Germany) Sascha Mockenhaupt	Capelli	Brita	Mobilebet

=== Managerial changes ===
Team	Outgoing	Manner	Exit date		Position in table	Incoming	Incoming date		Ref.
Team	Outgoing	Manner	Announced on	Departed on	Position in table	Incoming	Announced on	Arrived on	Ref.
1. FC Nürnberg	(Germany) Dieter Hecking (interim)	End of caretaker	20 February 2023	30 June 2023	Pre-season	(Germany) Cristian Fiél	10 June 2023	1 July 2023	
Eintracht Braunschweig	(Germany) Michael Schiele	Sacked	9 June 2023	30 June 2023	Pre-season	(Germany) Jens Härtel	11 June 2023	1 July 2023	
Schalke 04	(Germany) Thomas Reis	Sacked	27 September 2023		16th	(Germany) Matthias Kreutzer (interim)	27 September 2023		
Schalke 04	(Germany) Matthias Kreutzer (interim)	End of caretaker	9 October 2023		16th	(Belgium) Karel Geraerts	9 October 2023		
Eintracht Braunschweig	(Germany) Jens Härtel	Sacked	23 October 2023		18th	(Germany) Marc Pfitzner (interim)	23 October 2023		
Eintracht Braunschweig	(Germany) Marc Pfitzner (interim)	End of caretaker spell	7 November 2023		18th	(Germany) Daniel Scherning	7 November 2023		
VfL Osnabrück	(Germany) Tobias Schweinsteiger	Sacked	14 November 2023		18th	(Germany) Martin Heck / (Germany) Tim Danneberg (interim)	14 November 2023		
VfL Osnabrück	(Germany) Martin Heck / Tim Danneberg (interim)	End of caretaker spell	27 November 2023		18th	(Germany) Uwe Koschinat	27 November 2023		
1. FC Kaiserslautern	(Germany) Dirk Schuster	Sacked	30 November 2023		11th	(Germany) Niklas Martin (interim)	30 November 2023		
1. FC Kaiserslautern	(Germany) Niklas Martin (interim)	End of caretaker spell	3 December 2023		13th	(Greece) Dimitrios Grammozis	3 December 2023		
Hansa Rostock	(Germany) Alois Schwartz	Sacked	13 December 2023		16th	(Germany) Uwe Speidel (interim)	13 December 2023		
Hansa Rostock	(Germany) Uwe Speidel (interim)	End of caretaker spell	18 December 2023		16th	(Bosnia and Herzegovina) Mersad Selimbegović	18 December 2023	2 January 2024	
Hamburger SV	(Germany) Tim Walter	Sacked	12 February 2024		3rd	(Germany) Merlin Polzin (interim)	12 February 2024		
1. FC Kaiserslautern	(Greece) Dimitrios Grammozis	Sacked	13 February 2024		16th	(Germany) Friedhelm Funkel	14 February 2024		
Hamburger SV	(Germany) Merlin Polzin (interim)	End of caretaker spell	20 February 2024		3rd	(Germany) Steffen Baumgart	20 February 2024		
Wehen Wiesbaden	(Germany) Markus Kauczinski	Sacked	28 April 2024		16th	(Germany) Nils Döring (interim)	30 April 2024		

== League table ==
Pos	Team	Pld	W	D	L	GF	GA	GD	Pts	Qualification or relegation
1	FC St. Pauli (C, P)	34	20	9	5	62	36	+26	69	Promotion to Bundesliga
2	Holstein Kiel (P)	34	21	5	8	65	39	+26	68	Promotion to Bundesliga
3	Fortuna Düsseldorf	34	18	9	7	72	40	+32	63	Qualification for promotion play-offs
4	Hamburger SV	34	17	7	10	64	44	+20	58	
5	Karlsruher SC	34	15	10	9	68	48	+20	55	
6	Hannover 96	34	13	13	8	59	44	+15	52	
7	SC Paderborn	34	15	7	12	54	54	0	52	
8	Greuther Fürth	34	14	8	12	50	49	+1	50	
9	Hertha BSC	34	13	9	12	69	59	+10	48	
10	Schalke 04	34	12	7	15	53	60	−7	43	
11	SV Elversberg	34	12	7	15	49	63	−14	43	
12	1. FC Nürnberg	34	11	7	16	43	64	−21	40	
13	1. FC Kaiserslautern	34	11	6	17	59	64	−5	39	
14	1. FC Magdeburg	34	9	11	14	46	54	−8	38	
15	Eintracht Braunschweig	34	11	5	18	37	53	−16	38	
16	Wehen Wiesbaden (R)	34	8	8	18	36	50	−14	32	Qualification for relegation play-offs
17	Hansa Rostock (R)	34	9	4	21	30	57	−27	31	Relegation to 3. Liga
18	VfL Osnabrück (R)	34	6	10	18	31	69	−38	28	Relegation to 3. Liga

Source: DFB
Rules for classification: 1) Points; 2) Goal difference; 3) Goals scored; 4) Head-to-head results; 5) Head-to-head away goals scored; 6) Away goals scored; 7) Play-off.
(Rules 4–6 only apply after home and away matches have been played between the tied teams.)
(C) Champions; (P) Promoted; (R) Relegated

== Results ==
Home \ Away	BRA	BSC	DÜS	ELV	FÜR	HAM	HAN	KAI	KAR	KIE	MAG	NÜR	OSN	PAD	ROS	SCH	STP	WIE
Eintracht Braunschweig	—	1–1	1–4	5–0	0–1	0–4	0–0	2–1	2–0	0–1	1–0	2–2	3–2	1–3	0–1	1–0	1–1	1–0
Hertha BSC	3–0	—	2–2	5–1	5–0	1–2	1–1	3–1	2–2	2–2	3–2	3–3	0–0	3–1	4–0	5–2	1–2	0–1
Fortuna Düsseldorf	2–0	1–0	—	1–1	1–0	2–0	1–1	4–3	3–1	0–1	3–2	3–1	1–1	1–2	2–0	5–3	1–2	1–3
SV Elversberg	3–0	4–2	0–5	—	1–1	2–1	2–2	2–1	0–3	0–2	0–0	0–1	3–1	4–1	1–2	1–1	0–2	0–3
Greuther Fürth	3–3	1–2	1–0	1–4	—	1–1	1–3	2–1	4–3	2–1	1–1	2–1	4–0	5–0	1–0	2–0	0–0	2–0
Hamburger SV	2–1	3–0	1–0	1–0	2–0	—	3–4	2–1	3–4	0–1	2–0	4–1	1–2	1–2	2–0	5–3	1–0	3–0
Hannover 96	2–0	2–2	2–2	2–2	2–1	0–1	—	1–1	2–2	1–2	2–1	3–0	7–0	3–2	2–1	1–1	1–2	2–0
1. FC Kaiserslautern	5–0	1–2	1–3	3–2	0–2	3–3	3–1	—	0–4	0–3	4–1	3–1	3–2	1–2	3–1	4–1	1–2	1–1
Karlsruher SC	2–0	3–2	2–2	3–2	4–0	2–2	1–2	1–1	—	0–2	7–0	4–1	2–1	0–3	2–2	3–0	2–1	2–2
Holstein Kiel	1–2	2–3	1–1	1–1	2–1	4–2	3–0	1–3	1–0	—	2–4	0–2	4–0	2–1	2–0	1–0	3–4	3–2
1. FC Magdeburg	2–1	6–4	2–3	1–2	0–0	1–1	0–3	4–1	1–1	1–1	—	0–1	1–1	1–1	1–2	3–0	1–0	1–0
1. FC Nürnberg	2–1	3–1	0–5	3–0	1–1	0–2	2–2	1–1	0–1	0–4	1–0	—	2–2	0–2	3–0	1–2	0–2	2–1
VfL Osnabrück	0–3	2–1	0–4	0–1	2–0	2–1	1–0	2–2	2–3	1–1	0–2	2–3	—	0–0	0–0	0–4	1–1	0–2
SC Paderborn	1–2	2–3	4–3	3–1	0–1	1–0	1–0	1–2	1–1	0–4	0–0	1–3	1–1	—	3–0	3–1	2–2	2–1
Hansa Rostock	1–0	0–0	1–3	2–1	1–0	2–2	1–2	0–3	1–2	1–3	0–2	2–0	2–1	1–2	—	0–2	2–3	3–1
Schalke 04	1–0	1–2	1–1	1–2	2–2	0–2	3–2	3–0	0–0	0–2	4–3	2–0	4–0	3–3	2–1	—	3–1	1–0
FC St. Pauli	1–0	2–0	0–0	3–4	3–2	2–2	0–0	2–0	2–1	5–1	0–0	5–1	3–1	2–1	1–0	3–1	—	1–1
Wehen Wiesbaden	1–3	3–1	0–2	0–2	3–5	1–1	1–1	2–1	1–0	0–1	1–1	1–1	0–1	1–2	1–0	1–1	1–2	—

Source: DFB
Legend: Blue = home team win; Yellow = draw; Red = away team win.

== Promotion/relegation play-offs ==
The promotion/relegation play-offs took place on 24 and 28 May 2024.

=== Overview ===
Team 1	Agg.	Team 2	1st leg	2nd leg
Jahn Regensburg (3L)	4–3	Wehen Wiesbaden (2B)	2–2	2–1

=== Matches ===
24 May 2024
20:30

Jahn Regensburg	2–2	Wehen Wiesbaden
Ganaus 27'; Kother 79'	Report	Heußer 66'; Iredale 71'

Jahnstadion Regensburg, Regensburg
Attendance: 13,358
Referee: Tobias Reichel
28 May 2024
20:30

Wehen Wiesbaden	1–2	Jahn Regensburg
Prtajin 81'	Report	Kother 45+2'; Faber 47'

BRITA-Arena, Wiesbaden
Referee: Martin Petersen

Jahn Regensburg won 4–3 on aggregate and was promoted to the 2. Bundesliga. Wehen Wiesbaden is relegated to the 3. Liga.

== Statistics ==
=== Top goalscorers ===
Rank	Player	Club	Goals
1	(Germany) Robert Glatzel	Hamburger SV	22
1	(Bosnia and Herzegovina) Haris Tabaković	Hertha BSC	22
1	(Greece) Christos Tzolis	Fortuna Düsseldorf	22
4	(Germany) Marcel Hartel	FC St. Pauli	17
5	(Germany) Ragnar Ache	1. FC Kaiserslautern	16
5	(Turkey) Can Uzun	1. FC Nürnberg	16
7	(Croatia) Igor Matanović	Karlsruher SC	14
8	(Slovakia) László Bénes	Hamburger SV	13
8	(Turkey) Kenan Karaman	Schalke 04	13
8	(Croatia) Ivan Prtajin	Wehen Wiesbaden	13

=== Hat-tricks ===
Player	Club	Against	Result	Date
(Bosnia and Herzegovina) Haris Tabaković	Hertha BSC	Eintracht Braunschweig	3–0 (H)	17 September 2023
(Germany) Ragnar Ache	1. FC Kaiserslautern	Hansa Rostock	3–0 (A)	2 March 2024
(Germany) Paul Stock	SV Elversberg	Greuther Fürth	4–1 (A)	10 March 2024
(Greece) Christos Tzolis	Fortuna Düsseldorf	1. FC Magdeburg	3–2 (H)	19 May 2024
(Germany) Robert Glatzel	Hamburger SV	1. FC Nürnberg	4–1 (H)	19 May 2024
(Germany) Marlon Ritter	1. FC Kaiserslautern	Eintracht Braunschweig	5–0 (H)	19 May 2024

=== Clean sheets ===
Rank	Player	Club	Clean sheets
1	(Germany) Timon Weiner	Holstein Kiel	14
2	(Germany) Florian Kastenmeier	Fortuna Düsseldorf	10
2	(Germany) Jonas Urbig	Greuther Fürth	10
2	(Bosnia and Herzegovina) Nikola Vasilj	FC St. Pauli	10
5	(Germany) Dominik Reimann	1. FC Magdeburg	9
6	(Portugal) Daniel Heuer Fernandes	Hamburger SV	8
7	(Germany) Patrick Drewes	Karlsruher SC	7
7	(Germany) Ron-Thorben Hoffmann	Eintracht Braunschweig	7
7	(Germany) Ron-Robert Zieler	Hannover 96	7
10	(Netherlands) Pelle Boevink	Paderborn 07	6
10	(Germany) Markus Kolke	Hansa Rostock	6
10	(Germany) Philipp Kühn	VfL Osnabrück	6
10	(Germany) Marius Müller	Schalke 04	6

== Attendances ==
#	Football club	Home games	Average attendance
1	Schalke 04	17	61,388
2	Hamburger SV	17	55,908
3	Hertha BSC	17	50,559
4	1. FC Kaiserslautern	17	43,888
5	Fortuna Düsseldorf	17	39,672
6	Hannover 96	17	37,700
7	1. FC Nürnberg	17	34,416
8	FC St. Pauli	17	29,424
9	Karlsruher SC	17	27,099
10	Hansa Rostock	17	26,215
11	1. FC Magdeburg	17	24,988
12	Eintracht Braunschweig	17	20,692
13	VfL Osnabrück	17	14,366
14	Holstein Kiel	17	13,919
15	SC Paderborn 07	17	13,128
16	Greuther Fürth	17	12,503
17	SV Wehen Wiesbaden	17	9,385
18	SV 07 Elversberg	17	8,913

Source: European Football Statistics
