= Mattes Hansen =

German footballer

Personal information
- Full name: Mattes Hansen
- Date of birth: 15 May 2004 (age 22)
- Place of birth: Parchim, Germany
- Height: 1.83 m (6 ft 0 in)
- Position: Defensive midfielder

Team information
- Current team: SC Paderborn
- Number: 22

Youth career
- VfL Wolfsburg
- Schalke 04

Senior career*
Years	Team	Apps	(Gls)
2023–2026	SC Paderborn II	4	(0)
2023–	SC Paderborn	70	(2)

International career^{‡}
2019	Germany U16	1	(0)
2020	Germany U17	1	(0)
2022	Germany U19	1	(0)
2023–2025	Germany U20	6	(1)
- * Club domestic league appearances and goals as of 17:30, 31 October 2026 (UTC) ‡ National team caps and goals as of 15:16, 24 July 2026 (UTC)

Mattes Hansen (born 15 May 2004) is a German professional footballer who plays as a defensive midfielder for Bundesliga club SC Paderborn.

== Club career ==
Hansen is a product of the youth academies of VfL Wolfsburg and Schalke 04 where he captained their U19s. On 24 May 2023, he joined SC Paderborn in the 2. Bundesliga, where he began his senior career. On 1 February 2024, he extended his contract with Paderborn.

== International career ==
Hansen is a youth international for Germany, having first been called up to the Germany U20s in September 2023.

== Career statistics ==
As of match played 31 October 2026

Appearances and goals by club, season and competition
Club	Season	League			DFB-Pokal		Other		Total	
Club	Season	Division	Apps	Goals	Apps	Goals	Apps	Goals	Apps	Goals
SC Paderborn II	2023–24	Regionalliga West	2	0	—		—		2	0
SC Paderborn II	2024–25	Regionalliga West	1	0	—		—		1	0
SC Paderborn II	2025–26	Regionalliga West	1	0	—		—		1	0
SC Paderborn II	Total		4	0	—		—		4	0
SC Paderborn	2023–24	2. Bundesliga	18	2	1	1	—		19	3
SC Paderborn	2024–25	2. Bundesliga	15	0	0	0	—		15	0
SC Paderborn	2025–26	2. Bundesliga	29	0	2	0	2 (Note: Appearances in 2. Bundesliga promotion play-offs)	0	33	0
SC Paderborn	2026–27	Bundesliga	8	0	2	0	—		10	0
SC Paderborn	Total		70	2	5	1	2	0	77	3
Career total			74	2	5	1	2	0	81	3
