= Koen Kostons =

Dutch footballer (born 1999)

Personal information
- Date of birth: 18 September 1999 (age 27)
- Place of birth: Genk, Belgium
- Height: 1.85 m (6 ft 1 in)
- Position: Striker

Team information
- Current team: PEC Zwolle
- Number: 10

Youth career
- 2004–2013: Lanaken VV
- 2013–2017: MVV

Senior career*
Years	Team	Apps	(Gls)
2017–2021	MVV	97	(12)
2021–2022	Dalkurd	20	(12)
2022–2024	MVV	56	(18)
2024–2025	SC Paderborn	32	(7)
2025	→ Kortrijk (loan)	13	(0)
2025–	PEC Zwolle	34	(11)
- * Club domestic league appearances and goals as of 21 May 2026

Koen Kostons (born 18 September 1999) is a Dutch professional footballer who plays as a striker for Eredivisie club PEC Zwolle.

== Career ==
=== MVV ===
Kostons progressed through MVV's youth academy, joining their setup as a thirteen-year-old from boyhood club Lanaken VV. In the 2016–17 Eerste Divisie season, he was included in the matchday squad of the first team on several occasions, but did not yet make his debut. He made his debut on 19 September 2017 in a 3–2 loss to AZ in the KNVB Cup, replacing Christophe Janssens in the 90th minute. Kostons made his league debut on 6 October 2017 in a 3–2 loss against Almere City, coming off the bench in the 88th minute for Shermaine Martina. On 24 November 2017, he scored his first professional goal in a 3–1 victory against Helmond Sport.

=== Dalkurd ===
On 27 July 2021, Kostons joined Swedish third-tier Ettan club Dalkurd. He made his debut for Dalkurd on 15 August 2021, also scoring his first goal for the club, in a 1–1 draw against Umeå FC.

He was part of Dalkurd's promotion to the second highest level in Sweden, Superettan, scoring 11 goals in 16 appearances.

=== Return to MVV ===
On 4 July 2022, Kostons returned to his former club MVV on a two-year contract. He made his return debut for MVV on the first matchday of the 2022–23 season, starting at forward alongside Orhan Džepar in a 3–1 loss to Jong AZ. The following week he scored his first goal for the club upon returning, opening the score in a 3–1 home win over NAC Breda.

=== SC Paderborn ===
In January 2024 Kostons joined 2. Bundesliga club SC Paderborn.

==== Loan to Kortrijk ====
On 30 January 2025, Kostons moved on loan to Kortrijk in Belgium until the end of the 2024–25 season.

=== PEC Zwolle ===
On 17 July 2025, Kostons joined PEC Zwolle on a four-year contract.

== Career statistics ==
As of match played 7 February 2026

Appearances and goals by club, season and competition
Club	Season	League			National cup (Note: Includes KNVB Cup)		Other		Total	
Club	Season	Division	Apps	Goals	Apps	Goals	Apps	Goals	Apps	Goals
MVV	2017–18	Eerste Divisie	13	1	1	0	1 (Note: Appearances in Eerste Divisie play-offs)	0	15	1
MVV	2018–19	Eerste Divisie	33	6	0	0	—		33	6
MVV	2019–20	Eerste Divisie	21	1	1	0	—		22	1
MVV	2020–21	Eerste Divisie	30	4	1	1	—		31	5
MVV	Total		97	12	3	1	1	0	101	13
Dalkurd	2021	Ettan Norra	14	11	0	0	2 (Note: Appearances in Ettan promotion play-offs)	0	16	11
Dalkurd	2022	Superettan	6	1	0	0	—		6	1
Dalkurd	Total		20	12	0	0	2	0	22	12
MVV	2022–23	Eerste Divisie	36	9	1	1	0	0	37	9
MVV	2023–24	Eerste Divisie	20	9	1	0	—		21	9
MVV	Total		56	18	2	1	0	0	58	19
SC Paderborn	2023–24	2. Bundesliga	17	4	0	0	—		17	4
SC Paderborn	2024–25	2. Bundesliga	15	3	0	0	—		15	3
SC Paderborn	Total		32	7	0	0	—		32	7
K.V. Kortrijk (loan)	2024–25	Belgian Pro League	13	0	0	0	—		13	0
PEC Zwolle	2025–26	Eredivisie	22	10	2	1	—		24	11
Career total			240	59	7	3	3	0	250	62
