= 2026–27 SC Paderborn 07 season =

SC Paderborn 07
2026–27 season
- Manager: Ralf Kettemann
- Stadium: Home Deluxe Arena
- Bundesliga: Pre-season
- DFB-Pokal: Pre-season
Home colours	Away colours	Third colours

The 2026–27 season is the 120th season in the history of Sport-Club Paderborn 07 and their first season back in the Bundesliga since 2020. The club will also compete in the DFB-Pokal.

== Transfers ==
=== In ===
Pos.	Player	Transferred from	Fee	Date	Source
MF	(Germany) Tom Baack	(Germany) 1. FC Nürnberg	Free	1 July 2026	
FW	(Germany) Oliver Batista Meier	(Germany) Preußen Münster	Undisclosed	1 July 2026	
DF	(Germany) Jano ter Horst	(Germany) Preußen Münster	Undisclosed	1 July 2026	
FW	(Germany) Marvin Pieringer	(Germany) Heidenheim	€3,000,000	25 August 2026	

== Pre-season ==
5 July 2026 Friendly	SC Blau Weiß Ostenland (Germany)	0–18	(Germany) SC Paderborn
15:00			10', 30'; 12', 24'; 15'; 25'; 28'; 58'; 60'; 65'; 69'; 71'; 73'; 77'; 82', 90'; 84', 87'

25 July 2026 Friendly	SC Paderborn (Germany)	v	(Germany) 1. FC Magdeburg
14:00

1 August 2026 Friendly	SC Paderborn (Germany)	v	(Germany) VfL Osnabrück

== Competitions ==
=== Bundesliga ===
Pos	Team	Pld	W	D	L	GF	GA	GD	Pts	Qualification or relegation
12	Mainz 05	9	3	1	5	18	19	−1	10	
13	1. FC Köln	10	2	4	4	11	15	−4	10	
14	SC Paderborn	10	2	4	4	8	15	−7	10	
15	FC Augsburg	9	2	3	4	20	20	0	9	
16	Union Berlin	10	1	4	5	8	26	−18	7	Qualification for the relegation play-offs

Updated to match(es) played on 21 November 2026. Source: Bundesliga
Rules for classification: 1) Points; 2) Goal difference; 3) Goals scored; 4) Head-to-head aggregate results; 5) Head-to-head away goals scored; 6) Away goals scored; 7) Play-off at neutral site.
(Rules 4–6 only apply after all home-and-away matches have been played between the tied teams. Rule 7 only applies after the completion of the season.)

29 August 2026 1	Mainz 05	0–0	SC Paderborn	Mainz
15:30 CEST	Mwene (yellow card) 90+1'	Report	Castaneda (yellow card) 38'; Hansen (yellow card) 72'	Stadium: MEWA Arena; Attendance: 33,005; Referee: Tobias Stieler

5 September 2026 2	SC Paderborn	0–1	SC Freiburg	Paderborn
15:30 CEST	Curda (yellow card) 38'; Ter Horst (yellow card) 48'; Scheller (yellow card) 90+3'	Report	Eggestein 26'; Suzuki (yellow card) 43'; Lienhart (yellow card) 56'; Engelhardt (yellow card) 59'	Stadium: Home Deluxe Arena; Attendance: 15,000; Referee: Max Burda

12 September 2026 3	Borussia Dortmund	3–0	SC Paderborn	Dortmund
15:30 CEST	Silva 5'; Bellingham (yellow card) 66'; Nmecha 80', 89'	Report	Ulrich (yellow card) 39'	Stadium: Signal Iduna Park; Referee: Harm Osmers

20 September 2026 4	SC Paderborn	3–1	TSG Hoffenheim	Paderborn
19:30 CEST	Castañeda 29'; Marino 42'; Tigges 69'		Burger (yellow card) 45'; Daghim 50'	Stadium: Home Deluxe Arena; Referee: Daniel Schlager

10 October 2026 5	SC Paderborn	0–2	VfB Stuttgart	Paderborn
15:30 CEST	Pieringer (yellow card) 45'	Report	Chabot 25'; Führich 83'	Stadium: Home Deluxe Arena; Referee: Felix Zwayer

17 October 2026 6	Werder Bremen	2–2	Paderborn	Bremen
14:30 CEST (UTC+2)	Füllkrug 59', 65' (pen.); Regeer (yellow card) 86'	Report	Marino (yellow card) 4', (goal) 18'; Tigges 30'	Stadium: Weserstadion; Attendance: 40,517; Referee: Robert Schröder

24 October 2026 7	Paderborn	1–0	Hamburger SV	Paderborn
15:30 CEST (UTC+2)	ter Horst (yellow card) 58'; Philippe 88'		Nandja (yellow card) 53'; Lokonga (yellow card) 87'	Stadium: Home Deluxe Arena; Attendance: 15,000; Referee: Martin Petersen

31 October 2026 8	Borussia Mönchengladbach	0–0	SC Paderborn	Mönchengladbach
15:30 CET	Hashioka (yellow card) 41'; Chiarodia (yellow card) 50'	Report	Baack (yellow card) 29'; Scheller (yellow card) 81'; Ulrich (yellow card) 90+1'	Stadium: Borussia-Park; Attendance: 51,581; Referee: Timo Gerach

7 November 2026 9	SC Paderborn	2–2	Eintracht Frankfurt	Paderborn
15:30 CET (UTC+1)	Obermair 45'; Pieringer 73' (pen.); Zeitler (yellow card) 80'	Report	Burkardt 23', 90+3'; Baum (yellow card) 60' (yellow-red card) 75'; Collins (yellow card) 86'	Stadium: Home Deluxe Arena; Attendance: 15,000; Referee: Bastian Dankert

21 November 2026 10	Bayer Leverkusen	4–0	SC Paderborn	Leverkusen
15:30 CET (UTC+1)	Moreira 14', 47'; Schick 51'; Fernández (yellow card) 54', (goal) 59'; Gutiérrez (yellow card) 55'	Report		Stadium: BayArena; Attendance: 29,500; Referee: Tobias Reichel

=== DFB-Pokal ===
23 August 2026 First round	Phönix Lübeck	2–4	SC Paderborn	Lübeck
18:00	Kretzer 43'; Scheller 75' (o.g.)	Report	Ter Horst 22'; Castañeda 41'; Marino 61'; Vidović 71'	Stadium: Stadion an der Lohmühle; Attendance: 4,414; Referee: Felix Prigan

28 October 2026 Second round	SC Paderborn	0–1	VfB Stuttgart	Paderborn
18:00	Curda (red card) 37'; Obermair (yellow card) 85'	Report	Leweling (yellow card) 33'; Chabot (yellow card) 41'; Undav 90'	Stadium: Home Deluxe Arena; Attendance: 14,846; Referee: Florian Badstübner
