= Yanik Spalt =

Austrian footballer (born 2007)

Personal information
- Full name: Yanik Noah Spalt
- Date of birth: 3 September 2007 (age 19)
- Place of birth: Bludenz, Austria
- Height: 1.84 m (6 ft 0 in)
- Position: Midfielder

Team information
- Current team: VfB Stuttgart
- Number: 47

Youth career
- 2014–2020: FC Nüziders
- 2020–2023: Vorarlberg Academy
- 2023–: VfB Stuttgart

Senior career*
Years	Team	Apps	(Gls)
2025–	VfB Stuttgart II	25	(0)
2026–	VfB Stuttgart	2	(0)

International career^{‡}
2021–2022	Austria U15	6	(0)
2022–2023	Austria U16	12	(1)
2023–2024	Austria U17	12	
2024–2025	Austria U18	6	(1)
2025–	Austria U19	10	(1)
2026–	Austria U21	1	(0)
2026–	Austria	1	(0)
- * Club domestic league appearances and goals as of 17:33, 12 September 2026 (UTC) ‡ National team caps and goals as of 17 November 2026

Yanik Noah Spalt (born 3 September 2007) is an Austrian professional footballer who plays as a midfielder for Bundesliga club VfB Stuttgart and the Austria national team.

== Club career ==
From Nüziders, Spalt first represented Austria at under-15 level. A left-footed midfielder, Spalt moved from the Vorarlberg Academy to VfB Stuttgart in the summer of 2023, initially linking up with the Stuttgart U17 team. He went on to feature for the club in the UEFA Youth League, as well as captaining Austria at under-18 level. He signed a new contract with Stuttgart in February 2025. By the November of that year, he had extended his contract with the club again with a new long-term deal, having captained the club at under-19 level and having started consecutive matches on the left flank for VfB Stuttgart II in the 3. Liga.

Spalt made his Bundesliga debut for Stuttgart as a 19 year-old, appearing as a second-half substitute for Angelo Stiller during a 4–1 win over 1. FC Köln on 4 September 2026.

== International career ==
Spalt is a youth international for Austria, having represented the U15, U16, U17, U18, U19 and U21 teams.

He was one of the players who were called up with the Austria national team by head coach Ralf Rangnick for the 2026–27 UEFA Nations League B matches against Republic of Ireland on 14 November and Israel on 17 November 2026.

== Career statistics ==
As of match played 3 November 2026

Appearances and goals by club, season and competition
Club	Season	League			National cup (Note: Includes Slovak Cup, KNVB Cup)		Europe		Other		Total	
Club	Season	Division	Apps	Goals	Apps	Goals	Apps	Goals	Apps	Goals	Apps	Goals
VfB Stuttgart II	2025–26	3. Liga	22	0	—		—		—		22	0
VfB Stuttgart II	2026–27	3. Liga	3	0	—		—		—		3	0
VfB Stuttgart II	Total		25	0	—		—		—		25	0
VfB Stuttgart	2026–27	Bundesliga	2	0	0	0	1 (Note: Appearances in UEFA Champions League)	0	—		3	0
Career total			27	0	0	0	1	0	0	0	28	0

=== International ===
As of match played 17 November 2026

Appearances and goals by national team and year
National team	Year	Apps	Goals
Austria	2026	1	0
Total		1	0
