= Tim van der Leij =

Dutch footballer (born 2006)

Personal information
- Date of birth: 6 March 2006 (age 20)
- Place of birth: 's-Hertogenbosch, Netherlands
- Height: 1.93 m (6 ft 4 in)
- Position: Forward

Team information
- Current team: VfB Stuttgart II
- Number: 9

Youth career
- 2014–2017: PSV
- 2017–2025: Vitesse

Senior career*
Years	Team	Apps	(Gls)
2025–2026	RKC Waalwijk	33	(13)
2026–	VfB Stuttgart II	1	(1)
- * Club domestic league appearances and goals as of 28 August 2026

Tim van der Leij (born 6 March 2006) is a Dutch professional footballer who plays as a forward for 3. Liga club VfB Stuttgart II.

== Career ==
=== RKC Waalwijk ===
Originally a product of the RKC Waalwijk academy, van der Leij played for the senior team from 2025 to 2026. Van der Leij was a frequent starter for Waalwijk since their relegation from the Eredivisie to the Eerste Divisie, including in a 2–2 draw against Jong Utrecht, where he scored a brace.

=== VfB Stuttgart ===
Van der Leij was signed by German Bundesliga club VfB Stuttgart in June 2026, with a contract until 2030. He was initially assigned to their reserve team VfB Stuttgart II in 3. Liga.

== Career statistics ==
As of match played 23 May 2026

Appearances and goals by club, season and competition
Club	Season	League			Cup		Europe		Other		Total	
Club	Season	Division	Apps	Goals	Apps	Goals	Apps	Goals	Apps	Goals	Apps	Goals
RKC Waalwijk	2025–26	Eerste Divisie	33	13	3	4	—		2 (Note: Appearances in promotion play-offs)	0	38	17
VfB Stuttgart	2026–27	Bundesliga	0	0	0	0	0	0	—		0	0
Career total			33	13	3	4	0	0	2	0	38	17
