= Laurin Curda =

German footballer (born 2001)

Personal information
- Date of birth: 30 October 2001 (age 25)
- Place of birth: Ludwigsburg, Germany
- Height: 1.85 m (6 ft 1 in)
- Position: Centre-back

Team information
- Current team: SC Paderborn
- Number: 17

Youth career
- FV Löchgau
- ?–2017: VfB Stuttgart
- 2017–2020: TSG Hoffenheim

Senior career*
Years	Team	Apps	(Gls)
2019	TSG Hoffenheim II	1	(0)
2020–2021	SV Sandhausen II	12	(1)
2021–2023	TSG Balingen	61	(2)
2023–	SC Paderborn	80	(8)
2023–2024	SC Paderborn II	3	(0)

International career
2017	Germany U17	1	(0)
- * Club domestic league appearances and goals as of 31 October 2026

Laurin Curda (born 30 October 2001) is a German professional footballer who plays as a centre-back for Bundesliga club SC Paderborn.

== Career ==
Curda came through the youth systems of VfB Stuttgart and TSG Hoffenheim. In the 2022–23 season he won the Württemberg Cup with Regionalliga Südwest side TSG Balingen.

Curda left TSG Balingen in summer 2023 to join 2. Bundesliga club SC Paderborn. He had a good first season with Paderborn, making 20 appearances, including 16 as a starter in the 2. Bundesliga.

Ahead of the 2024–25 season, Curda faced competition for a position in Paderborn's defence from Marcel Hoffmeier und Visar Musliu and new signings Felix Götze and Tjark Schelle. On 13 December 2025, he scored his first ever double in a 4–0 away win at Karlsruher SC. On 25 May 2026, he netted an extra-time goal in the 100th minute to seal a 2–1 win over VfL Wolfsburg in the promotion play-offs, securing his club's promotion to the Bundesliga.

== Style of play ==
In September 2024, Paderborn manager Lukas Kwasniok highlighted Curda's strengths: "Laurin actually has everything a centre-back needs. He can dribble and head, he has power and pace. Laurin may not be a giant, but he's very stable. And he can play extremely well out the back.", naming "securing his own back" as a weakness of Curda.

== Career statistics ==
As of match played 31 October 2026

Appearances and goals by club, season and competition
Club	Season	League			DFB-Pokal		Other		Total	
Club	Season	Division	Apps	Goals	Apps	Goals	Apps	Goals	Apps	Goals
TSG Hoffenheim II	2018–19	Regionalliga Südwest	1	0	—		—		1	0
SV Sandhausen II	2020–21	Oberliga Baden-Württemberg	12	1	—		—		12	0
TSG Balingen	2021–22	Regionalliga Südwest	31	0	—		—		30	2
TSG Balingen	2022–23	Regionalliga Südwest	30	2	—		—		30	2
TSG Balingen	Total		61	2	—		—		61	2
SC Paderborn II	2023–24	Regionalliga West	3	0	—		—		3	0
SC Paderborn	2023–24	2. Bundesliga	20	0	2	0	—		22	0
SC Paderborn	2024–25	2. Bundesliga	20	1	2	0	—		22	1
SC Paderborn	2025–26	2. Bundesliga	32	7	2	0	2 (Note: Appearances in 2. Bundesliga promotion play-offs)	1	36	8
SC Paderborn	2026–27	Bundesliga	8	0	1	0	—		9	0
SC Paderborn	Total		80	8	7	0	2	1	89	9
Career total			157	11	7	0	2	1	166	12

== Honours ==
TSG Balingen

- Württemberg Cup: 2022–23
