= Jannik Huth =

German footballer (born 1994)

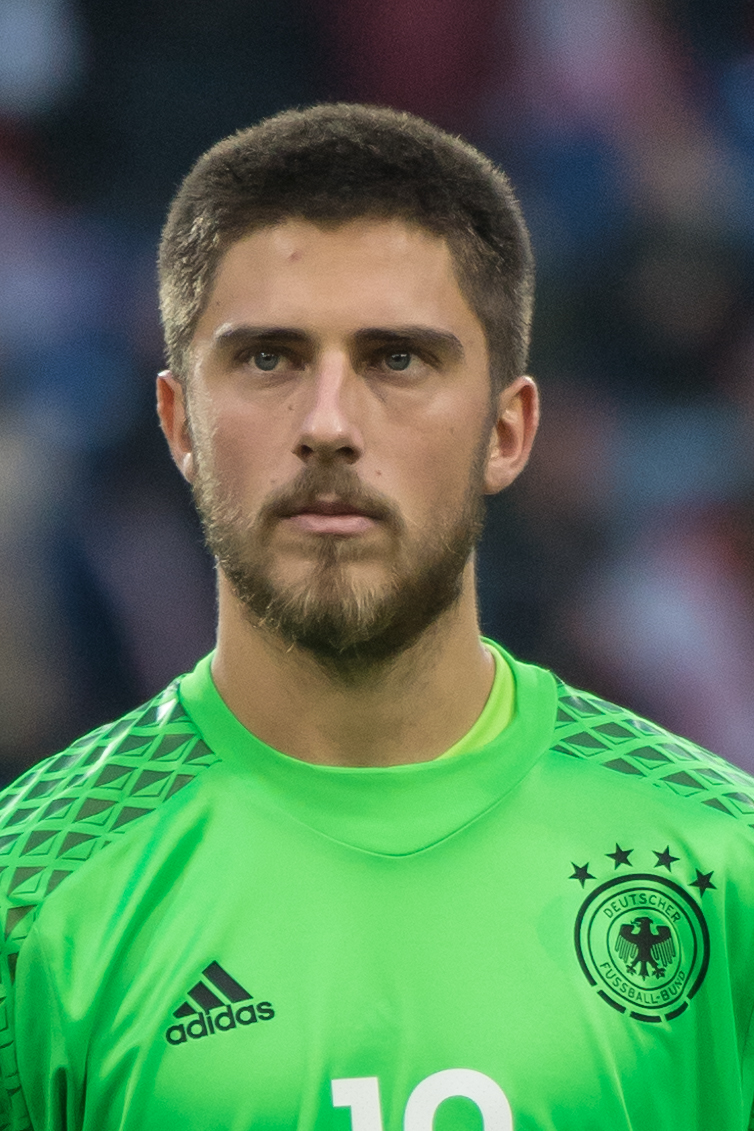
- Huth with Germany U21 in 2016

Personal information
- Date of birth: 15 April 1994 (age 32)
- Place of birth: Bad Kreuznach, Germany
- Height: 1.83 m (6 ft 0 in)
- Position: Goalkeeper

Team information
- Current team: SC Freiburg
- Number: 24

Youth career
- SG Guldental
- –2007: Hassia Bingen
- 2007–2013: Mainz 05

Senior career*
Years	Team	Apps	(Gls)
2013–2019	Mainz 05 II	49	(0)
2015–2019	Mainz 05	7	(0)
2018	→ Sparta Rotterdam (loan)	14	(0)
2019–2024	SC Paderborn	86	(0)
2024–	SC Freiburg	0	(0)

International career
2015	Germany U21	2	(0)
Medal record
Olympic Games
Silver medal – second place	2016 Rio de Janeiro	Team
- * Club domestic league appearances and goals as of 23 May 2024

Jannik Huth (born 15 April 1994) is a German professional footballer who plays as a goalkeeper for Bundesliga club SC Freiburg.

== Club career ==
=== Mainz 05 ===
Born in Bad Kreuznach, Huth grew up in nearby Guldental and started playing football with local clubs SG Guldental and Hassia Bingen.

Subsequently, he joined the youth ranks of Mainz 05 and eventually made it to their second team squad. He made his 3. Liga debut with Mainz 05 II at 5 October 2014 against Holstein Kiel.

In January 2018, Huth joined Eredivisie side Sparta Rotterdam on loan until the end of the season.

=== SC Paderborn ===
In May 2019, Huth joined newly promoted Bundesliga club SC Paderborn on a three-year contract, effective 1 July. He was expected to compete with Leopold Zingerle for the starting goalkeeper position. Huth began the season as Paderborn's first-choice goalkeeper due to Zingerle recovering from a shoulder injury sustained the previous season. However, after Zingerle's return, Huth was relegated to a backup role.

Following Paderborn's relegation to the 2. Bundesliga, Huth became the club's starting goalkeeper for the 2021–22 season. He held the position for more than two seasons before losing his place to Pelle Boevink midway through the 2023–24 campaign. He made 91 appearances for the club.

=== SC Freiburg ===
On 3 June 2024, Huth signed with SC Freiburg, effective in July. There, he was set to become the third goalkeeper behind Noah Atubolu and Florian Müller.

== International career ==
In late August 2015, Huth received his first ever call for a Germany youth team. He was nominated as a replacement for Odisseas Vlachodimos in the under-21 team.

He was part of the squad for the 2016 Summer Olympics, where Germany won the silver medal.

== Career statistics ==
As of match played 25 November 2023

Appearances and goals by club, season and competition
Club	Season	League			Cup		Europe		Other		Total	
Club	Season	Division	Apps	Goals	Apps	Goals	Apps	Goals	Apps	Goals	Apps	Goals
Mainz 05 II	2013–14	Regionalliga Südwest	1	0	—		—		—		1	0
Mainz 05 II	2014–15	3. Liga	15	0	—		—		—		15	0
Mainz 05 II	2015–16	3. Liga	31	0	—		—		—		31	0
Mainz 05 II	2016–17	3. Liga	2	0	—		—		—		2	0
Mainz 05 II	Total		49	0	—		—		—		49	0
Mainz 05	2015–16	Bundesliga	0	0	0	0	—		—		0	0
Mainz 05	2016–17	Bundesliga	7	0	0	0	—		—		7	0
Mainz 05	2017–18	Bundesliga	0	0	0	0	—		—		0	0
Mainz 05	2018–19	Bundesliga	0	0	0	0	—		—		05	0
Mainz 05	Total		7	0	0	0	—		—		7	0
Sparta Rotterdam (loan)	2017–18	Eredivisie	14	0	—		—		0	0	14	0
SC Paderborn	2019–20	Bundesliga	6	0	2	0	—		—		8	0
SC Paderborn	2020–21	2. Bundesliga	1	0	0	0	—		—		1	0
SC Paderborn	2021–22	2. Bundesliga	34	0	1	0	—		—		35	0
SC Paderborn	2022–23	2. Bundesliga	31	0	1	0	—		—		32	0
SC Paderborn	2023–24	2. Bundesliga	14	0	1	0	—		—		15	0
SC Paderborn	Total		86	0	5	0	—		—		91	0
SC Freiburg	2024–25	Bundesliga	0	0	0	0	—		—		0	0
SC Freiburg	2025–26	Bundesliga	0	0	0	0	0	0	—		0	0
SC Freiburg	Total		0	0	0	0	0	0	—		0	0
Career total			156	0	5	0	0	0	0	0	161	0

== Honours ==
SC Freiburg

- UEFA Europa League runner-up: 2025–26

Germany

- Summer Olympic Games: Silver Medal, 2016
