= Raphael Obermair =

Filipino footballer

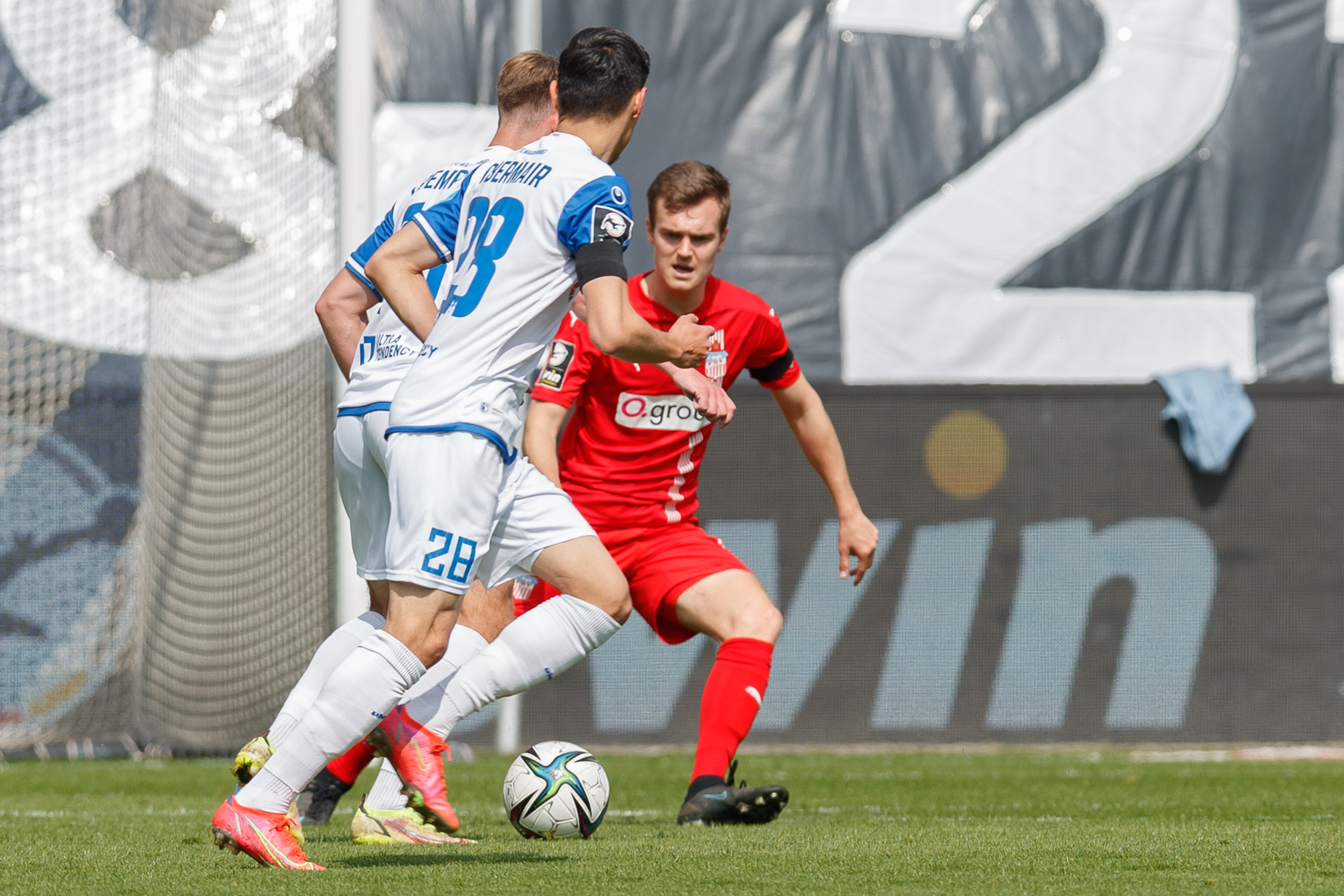
- Obermair in foreground, number 28

Personal information
- Full name: Raphael Obermair
- Date of birth: 1 April 1996 (age 30)
- Place of birth: Prien am Chiemsee, Germany
- Height: 1.82 m (6 ft 0 in)
- Position: Winger

Team information
- Current team: SC Paderborn
- Number: 23

Youth career
- 1860 Rosenheim

Senior career*
Years	Team	Apps	(Gls)
2014–2016	1860 Rosenheim	68	(4)
2016–2018	Bayern Munich II	61	(9)
2016–2018	Bayern Munich	0	(0)
2018–2019	Sturm Graz	4	(0)
2019–2020	Carl Zeiss Jena	30	(1)
2020–2022	1. FC Magdeburg	71	(7)
2022–	SC Paderborn	131	(15)

International career^{‡}
2026–	Philippines	1	(1)
- * Club domestic league appearances and goals as of 31 October 2026 ‡ National team caps and goals as of 31 March 2026

Raphael Obermair (born 1 April 1996) is a professional footballer who plays as a winger for Bundesliga club SC Paderborn. Born in Germany, he represents the Philippines national team.

== Club career ==
=== Youth ===
Obermair was born in Prien am Chiemsee, Bavaria. He spent his youth career at 1860 Rosenheim.

=== TSV 1860 Rosenheim ===
In 2014, Obermair was promoted to the first team of 1860 Rosenheim. He played in a total of 84 games, scoring 4 goals in his two-year spell with the senior team.

=== Bayern Munich ===
In 2016, Obermair joined the reserve team of Bundesliga club Bayern Munich.

=== Sturm Graz ===
In 2018, Obermair signed a two-year deal with Austrian Bundesliga club Sturm Graz.

=== Carl Zeiss Jena ===
In August 2019, Obermair signed a two-year contract with 3. Liga club Carl Zeiss Jena, joining the club on a free transfer. He scored his first and only goal for Carl Zeiss Jena in a 3–2 away defeat against Chemnitzer FC. In June 2020, after playing for one season, it was announced that Obermair have left the club.

=== 1. FC Magdeburg ===
In summer of 2020, Obermair joined 3. Liga club 1. FC Magdeburg on a free transfer, signing a deal until June 2022. Magdeburg won the 2021–22 3. Liga title and were promoted to 2. Bundesliga for the 2022–23 season.

=== SC Paderborn ===
In 2022, it was announced that Obermair had joined 2. Bundesliga club SC Paderborn on a free transfer.

== International career ==
Obermair was born and raised in Prien am Chiemsee, Germany to a German father and a Filipino mother, making him eligible to represent either Germany or the Philippines at international level.

=== Philippines ===
In May 2021, he was called up to the Philippines for three 2022 FIFA World Cup qualification matches.

In November 2021, Obermair was once again called up for the Philippines in the 2020 AFF Championship, but was not able to secure a release from his club.

In March 2026, Obermair was again called up to the Philippines for the remaining 2027 AFC Asian Cup qualification match against Tajikistan, where he made his debut and also scored his first goal against the latter.

== Career statistics ==
=== Club ===
As of match played 31 October 2026

Appearances and goals by club, season and competition
Club	Season	League			National cup		Europe		Other		Total	
Club	Season	Division	Apps	Goals	Apps	Goals	Apps	Goals	Apps	Goals	Apps	Goals
1860 Rosenheim	2014–15	Bayernliga Süd	30	2	–		–		–		30	2
1860 Rosenheim	2015–16	Bayernliga Süd	38	2	–		–		–		38	2
1860 Rosenheim	Total		68	4	–		–		–		68	4
Bayern Munich II	2016–17	Regionalliga Bayern	32	4	–		–		–		32	4
Bayern Munich II	2017–18	Regionalliga Bayern	29	5	–		–		–		29	5
Bayern Munich II	Total		61	9	–		–		–		61	9
Bayern Munich	2016–17	Bundesliga	0	0	0	0	0	0	0	0	0	0
Sturm Graz	2018–19	Austrian Bundesliga	4	0	1	0	2 (Note: One appearance in UEFA Champions League, one appearance in UEFA Europa League)	0	–		7	0
Sturm Graz II	2018–19	Austrian Regionalliga Central	8	1	–		–		–		8	1
Carl Zeiss Jena	2019–20	3. Liga	30	1	4	0	–		–		34	1
1. FC Magdeburg	2020–21	3. Liga	35	5	2	0	–		–		37	5
1. FC Magdeburg	2021–22	3. Liga	36	2	4	1	–		–		40	3
1. FC Magdeburg	Total		71	7	6	1	–		–		77	8
SC Paderborn	2022–23	2. Bundesliga	30	2	3	0	–		–		33	2
SC Paderborn	2023–24	2. Bundesliga	32	5	2	0	–		0	0	34	5
SC Paderborn	2024–25	2. Bundesliga	33	6	2	0	–		–		35	6
SC Paderborn	2025–26	2. Bundesliga	28	2	2	0	–		0	0	30	2
SC Paderborn	2026–27	Bundesliga	8	0	1	0	–		–		9	0
SC Paderborn	Total		131	15	10	0	–		0	0	141	15
Career total			373	35	21	1	2	0	0	0	396	36

=== International ===
As of match played 31 March 2026

Appearances and goals by national team and year
National team	Year	Apps	Goals
Philippines	2026	1	1
Total		1	1

Scores and results list Philippines' goal tally first.

List of international goals scored by Raphael Obermair
No.	Date	Venue	Opponent	Score	Result	Competition
1	31 March 2026	Hisor Central Stadium, Hisor, Tajikistan	Tajikistan	1–0	1–1	2027 AFC Asian Cup qualification

== Honours ==
=== Club ===
Magdeburg

- 3. Liga: 2021–22
