= Jano ter Horst =

German footballer

Personal information
- Date of birth: 19 June 2002 (age 24)
- Place of birth: Bad Bentheim, Germany
- Height: 1.84 m (6 ft 1/2 in)
- Position: Right-back

Team information
- Current team: SC Paderborn
- Number: 21

Youth career
- 2016–2021: SC Preußen Münster

Senior career*
Years	Team	Apps	(Gls)
2021–2023	SC Preußen Münster II	52	(1)
2021–2026	SC Preußen Münster	119	(5)
2026–	SC Paderborn	8	(0)
- * Club domestic league appearances and goals as of 17:30, 31 October 2026 (UTC)

Jano ter Horst (born 19 June 2002) is a German footballer who plays as a right-back for Bundesliga club SC Paderborn.

== Club career ==
In 2016, ter Horst joined the youth academy of SC Preußen Münster. He was promoted to their reserves in 2021, and also started making appearances with their senior team. On 1 December 2023, he extended his contract with the club, having won promotion to the 3. Liga in the previous season. Preußen Münster was promoted to the 2. Bundesliga for the 2024–25 season, and on 11 June 2025 he extended his contract with Preußen Münster until 2028.

In 2026, ter Horst transferred to newly-promoted Bundesliga side SC Paderborn.

== Career statistics ==
As of match played 31 October 2026

Appearances and goals by club, season and competition
Club	Season	League			DFB-Pokal		Europe		Other		Total	
Club	Season	Division	Apps	Goals	Apps	Goals	Apps	Goals	Apps	Goals	Apps	Goals
SC Preußen Münster II	2021–22	Oberliga Westfalen	27	0	—		—		—		27	0
SC Preußen Münster II	2022–23	Oberliga Westfalen	25	1	—		—		—		25	1
SC Preußen Münster II	Total		52	1	—		—		—		52	1
SC Preußen Münster	2021–22	Regionalliga West	1	0	—		—		1 (Note: Appearance(s) in Westphalian Cup)	0	2	0
SC Preußen Münster	2022–23	Regionalliga West	33	0	—		—		1	0	34	0
SC Preußen Münster	2023–24	3. Liga	26	3	1	0	—		3	1	30	4
SC Preußen Münster	2024–25	2. Bundesliga	27	1	0	0	—		—		27	1
SC Preußen Münster	2025–26	2. Bundesliga	32	1	1	0	—		—		33	1
SC Preußen Münster	Total		119	5	2	0	—		5	1	126	6
SC Paderborn	2026–27	Bundesliga	8	0	2	1	—		—		10	1
Career total			179	6	5	1	0	0	5	1	189	8

== Honours ==
SC Preußen Münster

- Regionalliga: 2022–23
