= Filip Bilbija =

German footballer

Personal information
- Full name: Filip Bilbija
- Date of birth: 24 April 2000 (age 26)
- Place of birth: Berlin, Germany
- Height: 1.89 m (6 ft 2 in)
- Position: Midfielder

Team information
- Current team: Derby County
- Number: 13

Youth career
- –2016: Tennis Borussia Berlin
- 2016–2018: Hertha Zehlendorf
- 2018–2019: FC Ingolstadt

Senior career*
Years	Team	Apps	(Gls)
2019–2020	FC Ingolstadt II	4	(2)
2019–2022	FC Ingolstadt	86	(12)
2022–2023	Hamburger SV	13	(1)
2023–2026	SC Paderborn	89	(29)
2026–	Derby County	7	(1)
- * Club domestic league appearances and goals as of 22:17, 6 November 2026 (UTC)

Filip Bilbija (born 24 April 2000) is a German professional footballer who plays as a midfielder for EFL Championship club Derby County.

== Personal life ==
Born in Germany, Bilbija is of Montenegrin and Serbian descent.

== Career ==
=== Youth and Early Career ===
Born in Berlin, Bilbija moved from the youth setup of Tennis Borussia Berlin to Hertha 03 Zehlendorf ahead of the 2016–17 season. In his first year there, he played in the second-tier Under 17 Regionalliga Northeast, before moving up to the Under 19 team for the 2017–18 season. After scoring 11 goals in 21 games in the Under 19 Regionalliga Northeast, he moved to FC Ingolstadt for the 2018–19 season, immediately becoming a regular under Roberto Pätzold. Bilbija scored six goals in 24 Under 19 Bundesliga appearances in that season, as his side finished in 4th place in the South/Southwest division.

As a result of his performances for the U19s, Bilbija was promoted to the professional team, who had previously been relegated to the 3. Liga, for the 2019–20 season. He made his professional debut in the 3. Liga on 22 July 2019, coming on as a substitute in the 67th minute for Fatih Kaya in a 2–1 away win against Carl Zeiss Jena. In his first year as a professional, he was used mostly as a reserve, starting seven times and scoring no goals in 23 3. Liga appearances. Ingolstadt finished in 4th place that season, advancing to the 3. Liga Promotion Round due to the ineligibility of FC Bayern Munich II to be promoted to the 2. Bundesliga. Bilbija featured in both the 2–0 first-leg defeat and the 3–1 second-leg win of that round against 1. FC Nürnberg, but his side remained in the third tier as a result of the away goals rule.

Bilbija became an important part of Tomas Oral's team in the 2020–21 season, making 35 league appearances and scoring five goals as Ingolstadt finished in 3rd place to qualify for the Promotion Round for the second successive season. Again, Bilbija played in both matches, scoring a decisive away goal in the second leg against VfL Osnabrück to earn his side a return to the 2. Bundesliga.

Following Oral's resignation immediately after promotion, three head coaches were appointed amid a difficult 2021–22 for the club - Bilbija's former U19 coach Pätzold, along with André Schubert and Rüdiger Rehm. Bilbija was a regular under all three, making 28 appearances and top scoring for his side with seven goals, but Ingolstadt were relegated in last place. Bilbija subsequently left the club at the end of his contract.

=== Hamburger SV ===
On 3 June 2022, Bilbija signed a four-year contract with 2. Bundesliga side Hamburger SV. During his first season, other attacking options were preferred by head coach Tim Walter, and Bilbija made just 13 substitute appearances scoring one goal. His side finished third, but were defeated 5–1 on aggregate by VfB Stuttgart in the Bundesliga Promotion Round.

=== SC Paderborn ===
On 7 July 2023, he signed for SC Paderborn. He made 27 league appearances in his debut season for the club, scoring five goals. In a three-year spell at the club, he scored 35 goals in 98 appearances as he helped the club gain promotion the Bundesliga in 2026.

=== Derby County ===
On 22 July 2026, upon expiry of his contract at Paderborn, Bilbija moved to England and signed with EFL Championship club Derby County on a three-year contract. On 8 August 2026, Bilbija made his debut for Derby County in a 2–1 EFL Cup defeat to Lincoln City. Bilbija scored his first Derby County goal in a 1–4 Championship defeat to Millwall.

== Career statistics ==
As of match played 3 November 2026

Appearances and goals by club, season and competition
Club	Season	League			National cup (Note: Includes DFB-Pokal, FA Cup)		League cup (Note: Includes EFL Cup)		Other		Total	
Club	Season	Division	Apps	Goals	Apps	Goals	Apps	Goals	Apps	Goals	Apps	Goals
FC Ingolstadt II	2019–20	Bayernliga Süd	0	0	—		—		—		0	0
FC Ingolstadt II	2020–21	Bayernliga Süd	4	2	—		—		—		4	2
FC Ingolstadt II	Total		4	2	—		—		—		4	2
Ingolstadt 04	2019–20	3. Liga	23	0	1	0	—		4 (Note: Two appearances and two goals in Bavarian Cup, two appearances in promotion play-offs)	2	28	2
Ingolstadt 04	2020–21	3. Liga	35	5	1	0	—		2 (Note: Appearances in promotion play-offs)	1	38	6
Ingolstadt 04	2021–22	3. Liga	28	7	2	1	—		—		30	8
Ingolstadt 04	Total		86	12	4	1	—		6	3	96	16
Hamburger SV	2022–23	2. Bundesliga	13	1	2	0	—		1	0	16	1
Paderborn 07	2023–24	2. Bundesliga	27	5	3	4	—		—		30	9
Paderborn 07	2024–25	2. Bundesliga	33	9	2	0	—		—		35	9
Paderborn 07	2025–26	2. Bundesliga	29	15	2	1	—		2	1 (Note: Appearances in promotion play-offs)	33	17
Paderborn 07	Total		89	29	7	5	—		2	1	98	35
Derby County	2026–27	EFL Championship	7	1	0	0	1	0	—		8	1
Career total			199	45	13	6	1	0	9	4	222	55
