= Nils Döring =

German footballer

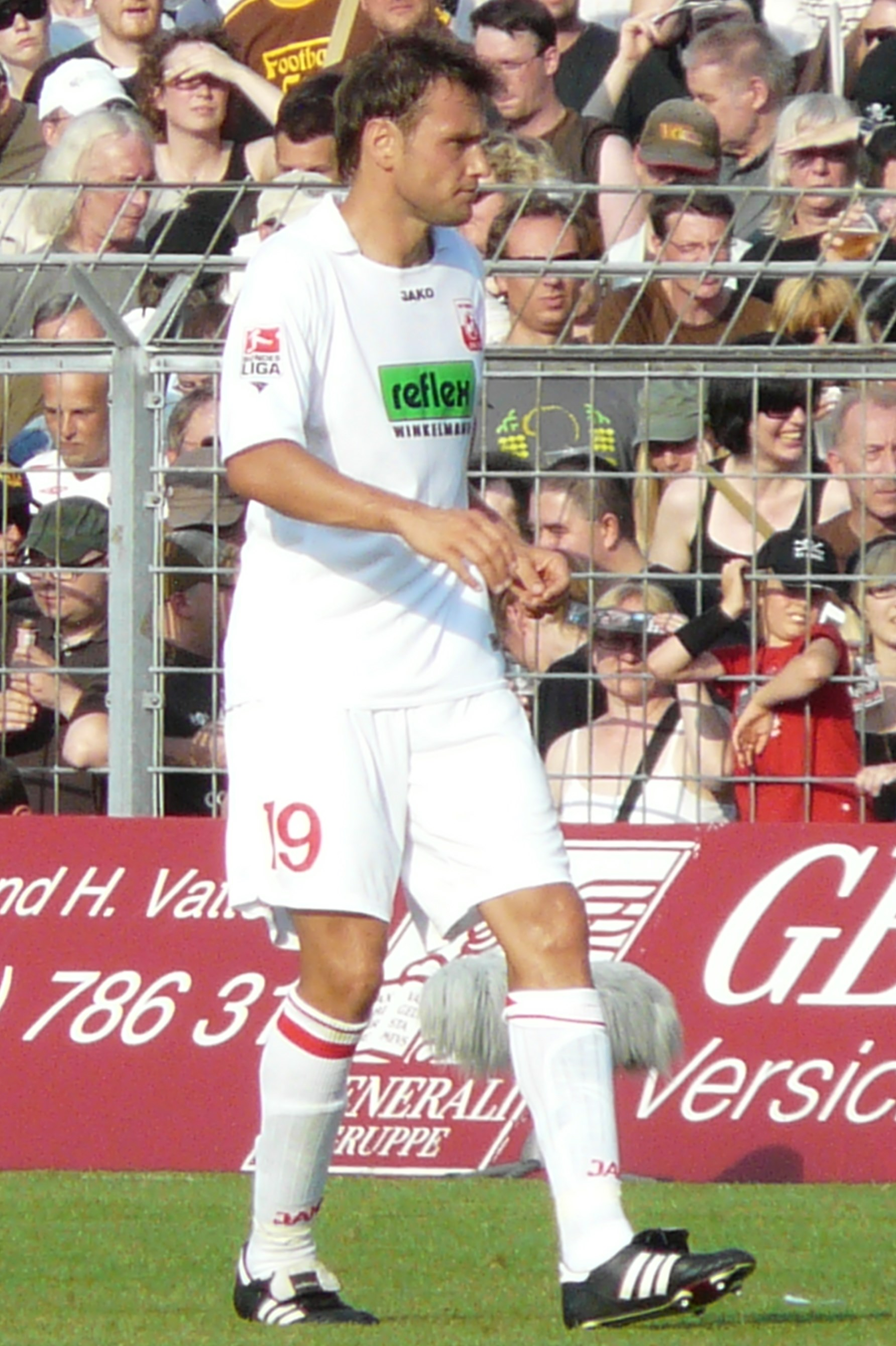

Personal information
- Date of birth: 23 April 1980 (age 46)
- Place of birth: Wiesbaden, West Germany
- Height: 1.92 m (6 ft 4 in)
- Position: Defender

Youth career
- –1996: SpVgg Wiesbaden-Sonnenberg
- 1996–: Mainz 05
- –2002: 1. FC Kaiserslautern

Senior career*
Years	Team	Apps	(Gls)
2002–2004	1. FC Kaiserslautern II	58	(1)
2004–2006	Sportfreunde Siegen	56	(5)
2006–2008	SC Paderborn	38	(1)
2008–2010	Rot Weiss Ahlen	51	(2)
2010–2011	Wehen Wiesbaden	9	(0)
2011–2014	TSV Schott Mainz		
2014–2015	Wehen Wiesbaden II	19	(3)

Managerial career
- 2021: Wehen Wiesbaden (interim)
- 2024: Wehen Wiesbaden (interim)
- 2024–2025: Wehen Wiesbaden
- * Club domestic league appearances and goals

Nils Döring (born 23 April 1980) is a German footballer, who last managed Wehen Wiesbaden.

Born in Wiesbaden, he was playing for SV Wehen Wiesbaden's reserves, while being both team manager and assistant for the sport director for the first team, SV Wehen Wiesbaden. He was named interim manager of the first team on 25 October 2021. He took over the same role in April 2024 and was named permanent head coach in June 2024. He was sacked in October 2025.
