= Pelle Boevink =

Dutch footballer (born 1998)

Personal information
- Date of birth: 6 January 1998 (age 28)
- Place of birth: Hengelo, Netherlands
- Height: 1.90 m (6 ft 3 in)
- Position: Goalkeeper

Team information
- Current team: Groningen
- Number: 30

Youth career
- 2009–2017: Twente

Senior career*
Years	Team	Apps	(Gls)
2016–2017	Jong FC Twente		
2017	Twente	0	(0)
2017–2019	Jong FC Groningen	18	(0)
2018–2019	FC Groningen	0	(0)
2019–2020	SSV Jeddeloh	16	(0)
2020–2022	VfB Oldenburg	35	(0)
2022–2025	SC Paderborn	30	(0)
2022	→ VfB Oldenburg (loan)	10	(0)
2023	SC Paderborn II	1	(0)
2025	FC Ingolstadt	16	(0)
2025–2026	Greuther Fürth	10	(0)
2026–	Groningen	0	(0)
- * Club domestic league appearances and goals as of 29 August 2026

Pelle Boevink (born 6 January 1998) is a Dutch professional footballer who plays as a goalkeeper for Eredivisie club Groningen.

== Career ==
Boevink joined Regionalliga Nord club SSV Jeddeloh from FC Groningen in June 2018, having agreed to a one-year contract with the option of a further year. In November 2019 he lost his regular place in the team and his contract was not renewed at the end of the 2019–20 season.

In June 2020 Boevink moved to Jeddeloh's local rivals VfB Oldenburg, also playing in the Regionalliga Nord. In the 2021–22 season he achieved promotion to the 3. Liga with Oldenburg.

Boevink signed with 2. Bundesliga side SC Paderborn in summer 2022 and was loaned back to VfB Oldenburg for the 2022–23 season with Oldenburg receiving a transfer fee. He made ten 3. Liga appearances, sharing goalkeeping duties with Sebastian Mielitz, before the loan was terminated in December and he moved to Paderborn.

Boevink replaced Paderborn's captain Jannik Huth as the club's first-choice goalkeeper in December 2023. Also in the same month, he had a good performance against Hamburger SV in the league and was voted player of the month by Paderborn's fans.

On 23 January 2025, Boevink moved to FC Ingolstadt in the 3. Liga.

On 17 June 2025, Boevink signed a two-year contract with Greuther Fürth in 2. Bundesliga.

On 2 September 2026, he returned to Groningen until the end of the 2026–27 season.

== Career statistics ==
As of match played 1 July 2024

Appearances and goals by club, season and competition
Club	Season	League			National cup (Note: Includes DFB-Pokal.)		Other		Total	
Club	Season	Division	Apps	Goals	Apps	Goals	Apps	Goals	Apps	Goals
Jong FC Groningen	2017–18	Derde Divisie	1	0	–		–		1	0
Jong FC Groningen	2018–19	Derde Divisie	17	0	–		–		17	0
Jong FC Groningen	Total		18	0	0	0	0	0	18	0
SSV Jeddeloh	2019–20	Regionalliga Nord	16	0	–		–		16	0
VfB Oldenburg	2020–21	Regionalliga Nord	7	0	–		–		7	0
VfB Oldenburg	2021–22	Regionalliga Nord	28	0	–		2 (Note: Appearances in promotion play-offs)	0	30	0
VfB Oldenburg	Total		35	0	0	0	2	0	37	0
VfB Oldenburg (loan)	2022–23	3. Liga	10	0	–		–		10	0
SC Paderborn II	2023–24	Regionalliga West	1	0	–		–		1	0
SC Paderborn	2023–24	2. Bundesliga	20	0	2	0	–		22	0
Career total			100	0	2	0	2	0	104	0
