= Uwe Speidel =

German football coach (born 1971)

Uwe Speidel (born 27 March 1971) is a German football coach.

He spent most of his career as a conditioning coach or assistant manager, having two spells as interim manager of MSV Duisburg and Hansa Rostock in the 2. Bundesliga. At the start of his career, he worked at S.L. Benfica in Portugal and Xerez CD in Spain, under Germans Jupp Heynckes and Bernd Schuster respectively.

== Career ==
Born in Creglingen, Baden-Württemberg, Speidel began his career as a conditioning coach at Fortuna Köln and 1. FC Köln. In July 2000 he moved to S.L. Benfica of the Portuguese Primeira Liga, managed by compatriot Jupp Heynckes; he signed a one-year deal to work at all levels of the club, especially the youth and B-team.

In 2001, Speidel moved across the border to work at Xerez CD in the Spanish Segunda División under German manager Bernd Schuster. Spanish newspaper ABC noted the strictness of Speidel's pre-season training sessions for the team in Germany, and that his limited Spanish vocabulary concentrated on the word "¡Más!" ("More!"). In October, he refused to work until his wage backlog was sorted. In 2003, after Schuster left Xerez, Speidel returned home to Schalke 04 to work under Heynckes.

Speidel was Heynckes's assistant at Borussia Mönchengladbach from 2005 to January 2007, being let go at a difficult time that saw Heynckes under police protection from fans. He was assistant manager at MSV Duisburg in the 2. Bundesliga and Bundesliga between 2008 and 2010; after the dismissal of Peter Neururer he was the interim manager on 1 November 2009 for a 3–0 win at TuS Koblenz in the second tier.

Speidel returned to conditioning coaching at Bayern Munich II and was assistant manager at Energie Cottbus and Arminia Bielefeld. In February 2017, incoming VfL Wolfsburg manager Andries Jonker named him and Freddie Ljungberg as assistants. All three were fired in September.

In 2021, Speidel returned to work at Hansa Rostock's academy. He was put in charge of the first team in the 2. Bundesliga on an interim basis, losing 3–0 at SC Paderborn on his debut on 15 December 2023.
