= 2024–25 SC Paderborn 07 season =

SC Paderborn 07
2024–25 season
- Manager: Lukas Kwasniok
- Stadium: Home Deluxe Arena
- 2. Bundesliga: 6th
- DFB-Pokal: Second round
- Top goalscorer: League: Filip Bilbija (5); All: Filip Bilbija (5)

The 2024–25 season is the 118th season in the history of SC Paderborn 07 and the fifth consecutive season in 2. Bundesliga. In addition to the domestic league, the team is scheduled to participate in the DFB-Pokal.

== Transfers ==
=== In ===
Pos.	Player	Transferred from	Fee	Date	Source
FW	(Germany) Sven Michel	(Germany) FC Augsburg	€300,000	5 July 2024	
MF	(Finland) Casper Terho	(Belgium) Union Saint-Gilloise	Loan	1 January 2025	
MF	(Germany) Marvin Mehlem	(England) Hull City	Loan	3 January 2025	

=== Out ===
Pos.	Player	Transferred to	Fee	Date	Source
DF	(Germany) Maximilian Rohr	(Germany) SV Elversberg	Undisclosed	5 August 2024	

== Friendlies ==
=== Pre-season ===
30 June 2024 Friendly	SC Paderborn (Germany)	6–2	(Germany) Kickers Emden
12:00

5 July 2024 Friendly	Viktoria Köln (Germany)	0–1	(Germany) SC Paderborn
12:30			Platte 16'

10 July 2024 Friendly	SC Paderborn (Germany)	0–0	(Ukraine) Dynamo Kyiv	Walchsee, Austria
17:00 UTC+2				Stadium: Ramsbachstadion Walchsee

13 July 2024 Friendly	SC Paderborn (Germany)	5–0	(England) Birmingham City	Thiersee, Austria
17:00	Michel 12', 13'; Bilbija 59', 80'; Ansah 61'	Report		Stadium: Sportplatz Thiersee; Attendance: 800

27 July 2024 Friendly	Twente (Netherlands)	0–3	(Germany) SC Paderborn
13:15

=== Mid-season ===
6 January 2025 Friendly	SC Paderborn (Germany)	1–1	(Netherlands) sc Heerenveen	Oliva, Spain
14:00				Stadium: Oliva Nova Sports Center

9 January 2025 Friendly	Viktoria Plzeň (Czech Republic)	2–2	(Germany) SC Paderborn
15:00 UTC+1

13 January 2025 Friendly	SC Paderborn (Germany)	2–1	(Germany) SC Verl
13:00

20 March 2025 Friendly	Hannover 96 (Germany)	0–1	(Germany) SC Paderborn
13:00

== Competitions ==
=== Overall record ===
Competition	First match	Last match	Starting round	Final position	Record							
Competition	First match	Last match	Starting round	Final position	Pld	W	D	L	GF	GA	GD	Win %
2. Bundesliga	3 August 2024	18 May 2025	Matchday 1		17	7	7	3	29	24	+5	41.18
DFB-Pokal	19 August 2024	30 October 2024	First round	Second round	2	1	0	1	4	1	+3	50.00
Total					19	8	7	4	33	25	+8	42.11

Last updated: 21 December 2024
Source: Soccerway

=== 2. Bundesliga ===
==== League table ====
Pos	Team	Pld	W	D	L	GF	GA	GD	Pts	Promotion, qualification or relegation
2	Hamburger SV (P)	34	16	11	7	78	44	+34	59	Promotion to Bundesliga
3	SV Elversberg	34	16	10	8	64	37	+27	58	Qualification for promotion play-offs
4	SC Paderborn	34	15	10	9	56	46	+10	55	
5	1. FC Magdeburg	34	14	11	9	64	52	+12	53	
6	Fortuna Düsseldorf	34	14	11	9	57	52	+5	53	

Source: Bundesliga
Rules for classification: 1) Points; 2) Goal difference; 3) Goals scored; 4) Head-to-head results; 5) Head-to-head away goals scored; 6) Away goals scored; 7) Play-off.
(Rules 4–6 only apply after home and away matches have been played between the tied teams.)
(P) Promoted

==== Results summary ====
Overall								Home						Away					
Pld	W	D	L	GF	GA	GD	Pts	W	D	L	GF	GA	GD	W	D	L	GF	GA	GD
1	1	0	0	2	1	+1	3	0	0	0	0	0	0	1	0	0	2	1	+1

==== Results by round ====
Round	1	2
Ground	A	H
Result	W	
Position		

A = Away; H = Home; W = Win; D = Draw; L = Loss

==== Matches ====
The match schedule was released on 4 July 2024.

3 August 2024 1	Hertha BSC	1–2	SC Paderborn	Berlin
13:00	Maza 72'	Report	Götze 42'; Bilbija 48'	Stadium: Olympiastadion; Attendance: 48,591; Referee: Wolfgang Haslberger

11 August 2024 2	SC Paderborn	3–1	Darmstadt 98	Paderborn
13:30				Stadium: Home Deluxe Arena

14 December 2024 16	Magdeburg	1–1	SC Paderborn	Magdeburg

21 December 2024 17	SC Paderborn	1–2	Karlsruher SC	Paderborn

19 January 2025 18	SC Paderborn	1–2	Hertha BSC	Paderborn

26 January 2025 19	Darmstadt 98	0–1	SC Paderborn	Darmstadt

2 February 2025 20	SC Paderborn	1–2	Greuther Fürth	Paderborn

8 February 2025 21	SSV Ulm	0–2	SC Paderborn	Ulm

14 February 2025 22	SC Paderborn	2–0	Preußen Münster	Paderborn

22 February 2025 23	Hannover 96	1–1	SC Paderborn	Hanover

2 March 2025 24	SC Paderborn	2–0	Hamburger SV	Paderborn

9 March 2025 25	Jahn Regensburg	0–0	SC Paderborn	Regensburg

15 March 2025 26	SC Paderborn	5–3	Kaiserslautern	Paderborn

29 March 2025 27	SC Paderborn	1–2	1. FC Köln	Paderborn

4 April 2025 28	Eintracht Braunschweig	3–2	SC Paderborn	Braunschweig

13 April 2025 29	SC Paderborn	1–2	Fortuna Düsseldorf	Paderborn

19 April 2025 30	Nürnberg	2–3	SC Paderborn	Nuremberg

26 April 2025 31	SC Paderborn	v	Elversberg	Paderborn
13:00

=== DFB-Pokal ===
18 August 2024 First round	Bremer SV	0–4	SC Paderborn	Bremen
15:30				Stadium: Stadion am Panzenberg
