= 1954 DFB-Pokal final =

- Event: 1953–54 DFB-Pokal
VfB Stuttgart	1. FC Köln
1	0
- After extra time
- Date: 17 April 1954
- Venue: Südweststadion, Ludwigshafen
- Referee: Albert Dusch (Kaiserslautern)
- Attendance: 60,000

The 1954 DFB-Pokal final decided the winner of the 1953–54 DFB-Pokal, the 11th season of Germany's knockout football cup competition. It was played on 17 April 1954 at the Südweststadion in Ludwigshafen. VfB Stuttgart won the match 1–0 after extra time against 1. FC Köln, to claim their 1st cup title.

== Route to the final ==
The DFB-Pokal began with 8 teams in a single-elimination knockout cup competition. There were a total of two rounds leading up to the final. Teams were drawn against each other, and the winner after 90 minutes would advance. If still tied, 30 minutes of extra time was played. If the score was still level, a replay would take place at the original away team's stadium. If still level after 90 minutes, 30 minutes of extra time was played. If the score was still level, a drawing of lots would decide who would advance to the next round.

Note: In all results below, the score of the finalist is given first (H: home; A: away).

VfB Stuttgart		Round	1. FC Köln
Opponent	Result	1953–54 DFB-Pokal	Opponent	Result
Bergisch Gladbach 09 (H) (A)	1–1 (a.e.t.); 6–0 (replay)	Quarter-finals	Viktoria 89 Berlin (H)	3–2
TuS Neuendorf (H) (A)	2–2 (a.e.t.); 2–0 (replay)	Semi-finals	Hamburger SV (A)	3–1 (a.e.t.)

== Match ==
=== Details ===
17 April 1954

VfB Stuttgart	1–0 (a.e.t.)	1. FC Köln
Waldner 94'	Report

Südweststadion, Ludwigshafen
Attendance: 60,000
Referee: Albert Dusch (Kaiserslautern)

VfB Stuttgart	1. FC Köln

GK	1	(West Germany) Karl Bögelein
RB		(West Germany) Erich Retter
LB		(West Germany) Richard Steimle
RH		(West Germany) Pit Krieger
CH		(West Germany) Robert Schlienz (c)
LH		(West Germany) Karl Barufka
OR		(West Germany) Ludwig Hinterstocker
IR		(West Germany) Otto Baitinger
CF		(West Germany) Walter Bühler
IL		(West Germany) Rolf Blessing
OL		(West Germany) Erwin Waldner
Manager:
(West Germany) Georg Wurzer

GK	1	(Netherlands) Frans de Munck
RB		(West Germany) Stefan Langen
LB		(West Germany) Hans Graf (c)
RH		(West Germany) Paul Mebus
CH		(West Germany) Benno Hartmann
LH		(West Germany) Herbert Dörner
OR		(West Germany) Walter Müller
IR		(West Germany) Georg Stollenwerk
CF		(West Germany) Berthold Nordmann
IL		(West Germany) Josef Röhrig
OL		(West Germany) Hans Schäfer
Manager:
(West Germany) Karl Winkler

Match rules

- 90 minutes.
- 30 minutes of extra time if necessary.
- Replay if scores still level.
- No substitutions.
