= Stuttgart Spring Festival =

Annual fair that takes place in the German city of Stuttgart

Coordinates: 48°47′49″N 9°13′02″E

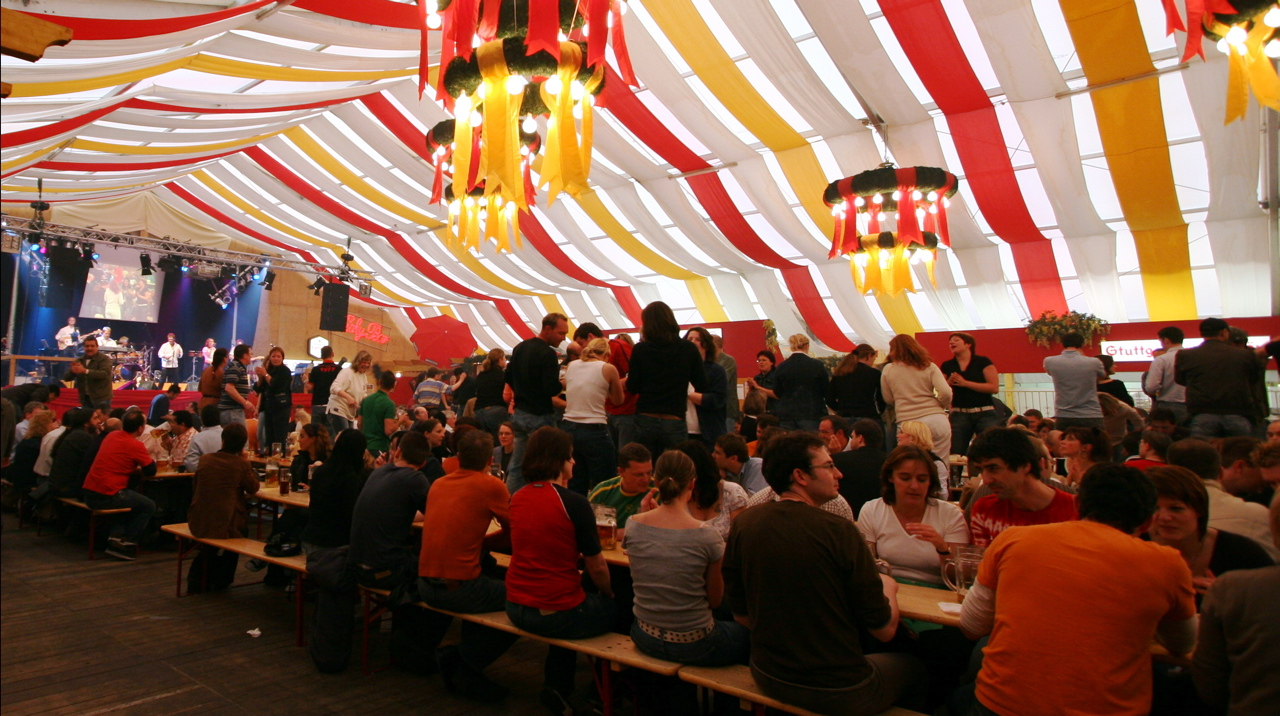
Inside the Stuttgarter Hofbräu Beer Tent

Stuttgart Spring Festival (in German called Stuttgarter Frühlingsfest or sometimes vernacular Cannstatter Wasen or just Wasen) is an annual fair that takes place in the German city of Stuttgart between the middle of April and the beginning of May. The festival takes place on the Cannstatter Wasen, traditional fairgrounds in Stuttgart's Bad Cannstatt district. It is slightly smaller than the festival in the autumn (and therefore occasionally also called the "small Wasen"), but it is the largest spring festival in Europe. Like the autumn fair, the Frühlingsfest offers a variety of fairground attractions. The tallest attraction is the 47 metre Ferris wheel and the fair almost invariably features a major roller coaster.

The Frühlingsfest starts on a Saturday with the traditional opening of a beer barrel by the Stuttgart mayor.

The Fruit Column, a tall wooden structure decorated with fruits, was introduced to the Stuttgarter Frühlingsfest in 1995. Originally it was only present at the autumn Volksfest but in 1995 it was left to stand on the festival site all year round. However, in later years, this practice was changed and once again the column began to be dismantled in the autumn of each year, leaving just the base. This carried a large can during the Stuttgarter Frühlingsfest.

== Periods of operation ==
- The festival opened Monday - Friday at noon, Saturday, Sunday and holidays at 11 am.
- Closing time was 11 pm on Sunday - Thursday and midnight on Friday, Saturday and before holidays.
- Musical performances ended in the main tents half an hour before closing.

== See also ==
- Beer festival
- The autumn fair in Stuttgart (Cannstatter Wasen)
