= VfB Stuttgart =

Association football club in Germany

- Full name: Verein für Bewegungsspiele Stuttgart 1893 e. V.
- Nicknames: Die Roten (The Reds); Die Schwaben (The Swabians)
- Short name: VfB
- Founded: 9 September 1893; 133 years ago
- Stadium: MHPArena
- Capacity: 60,058
- Owner(s): Mercedes-Benz Group (10.4%); Porsche AG (10.4%); Jako AG (1.0%)
- President: Dietmar Allgaier
- Head coach: Sebastian Hoeneß
- League: Bundesliga
- 2025–26: Bundesliga, 4th of 18
- Website: vfb.de
| Home colours | Away colours | Third colours |

Verein für Bewegungsspiele Stuttgart 1893 e. V. (lit. 'Association for Movement Games Stuttgart 1893'), commonly known as VfB Stuttgart (German pronunciation: [faʊ̯ɛfˈbeː ˈʃtʊtɡaʁt]), is a German professional sports club based in Stuttgart, Baden-Württemberg. The club's football team is currently part of Germany's first division, the Bundesliga. VfB Stuttgart has won the national championship five times, most recently in 2006–07, the DFB-Pokal four times and the UEFA Intertoto Cup a record two times. In the all-time Bundesliga table the club sits in fourth place.

The football team plays its home games at the MHPArena, in the Neckarpark which is located near the Cannstatter Wasen, where the city's fall beer festival takes place. Second team side VfB Stuttgart II currently plays in the 3. Liga, which is the highest division allowed for a reserve team. The club's junior teams have won the national under 19 championships a record ten times and the national under 17 championships seven times.

A membership-based club with over 100,000 members, VfB is the largest sports club in Baden-Württemberg and the eighth-largest football club in Germany. It has departments for fistball, field hockey, track and field, table tennis, and football referees, all of which compete only at the amateur level. The club also maintains an esports department and a social department, the VfB-Garde.

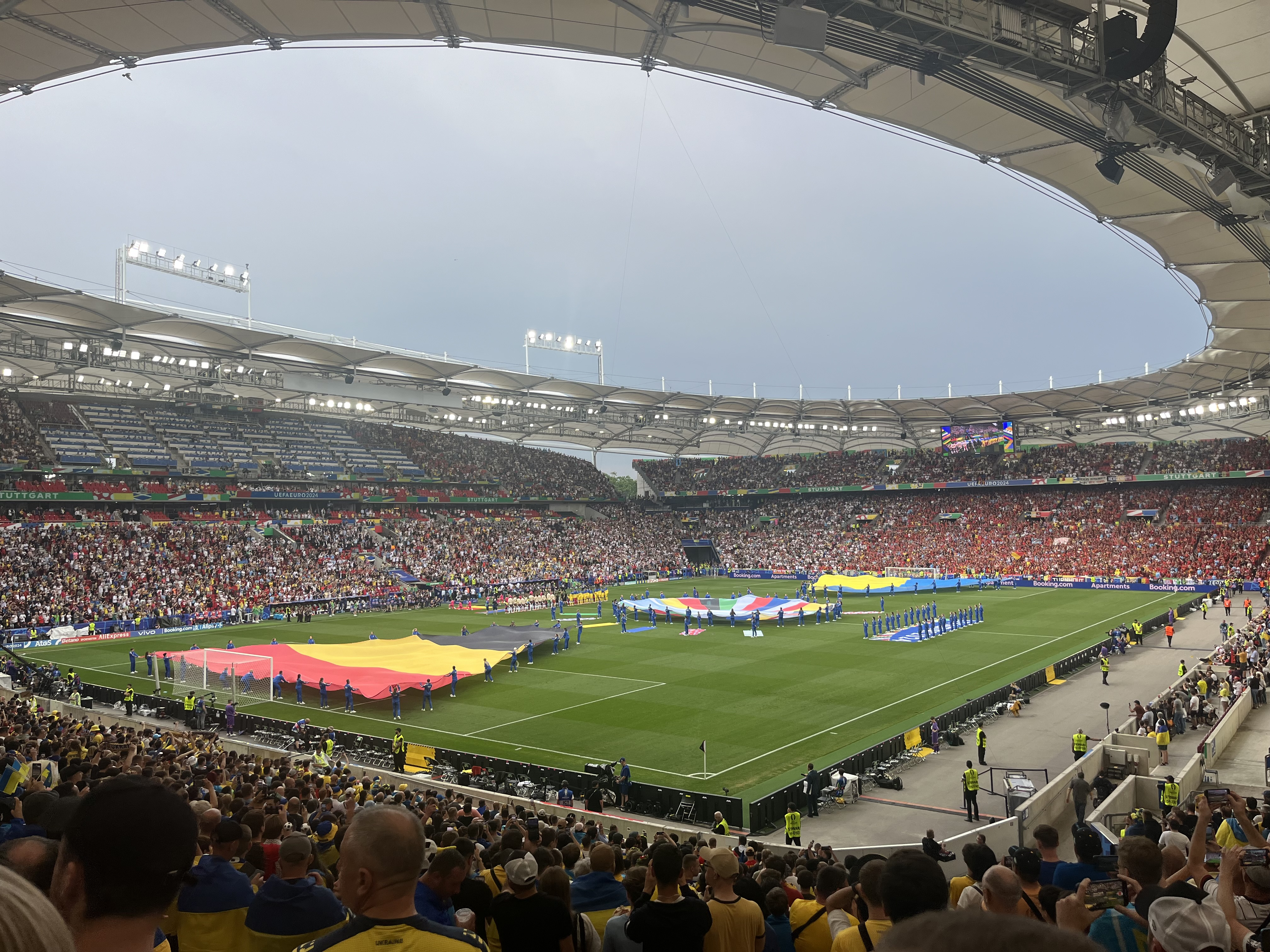
The MHP Arena and the renovated main stand of the stadium during a group match between Ukraine and Belgium of the 2024 European Championship

== History ==
=== Foundation to WWII ===
Verein für Bewegungsspiele Stuttgart was formed through a 2 April 1912 merger of predecessor sides Stuttgarter FV and FC Krone Cannstatt following a meeting in the Concordia hotel in Cannstatt. Each of these clubs was made up of school pupils with middle-class roots who learned new sports such as rugby union and football from English expatriates such as William Cail who introduced rugby in 1865.

==== FV Stuttgart ====
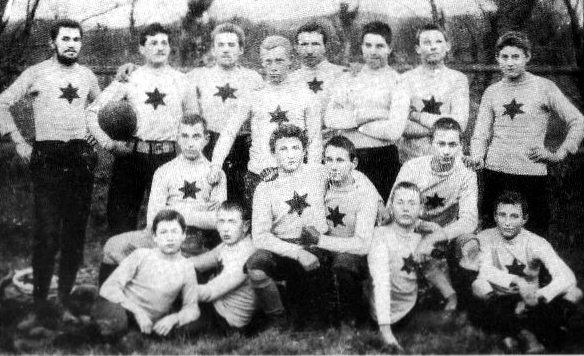
FV Stuttgart in 1894

Stuttgarter Fußballverein was founded at the Zum Becher hotel in Stuttgart on 9 September 1893. FV were initially a rugby club, playing games at Stöckach-Eisbahn before moving to Cannstatter Wasen in 1894. The rugby club established a football section in 1908. The team drew players primarily from local schools, under the direction of teacher Carl Kaufmann, and quickly achieved its first success; in 1909, they were runners-up to FSV 1897 Hannover in the national rugby final, losing 6–3. Rugby was soon replaced by association football within the club, as spectators found the game too complicated to follow.

In 1909, FV joined the Süddeutschen Fußballverband (South German Football Association), playing in the second tier B-Klasse. In their second season FV won a district final against future merger partner Kronen-Klub Cannstatt before being defeated by FV Zuffenhausen in the county championship that would have seen the side promoted. They eventually advanced to the senior Südkreis-Liga in 1912.

==== Kronenclub Cannstatt ====
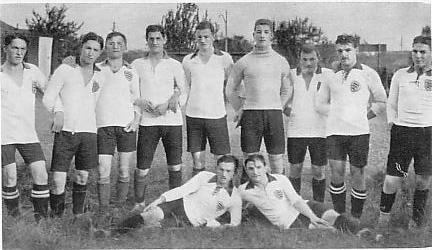
The first team in 1912

Cannstatter Fußballklub was formed as a rugby club in 1890 and also quickly established a football team. This club was dissolved after just a few years of play and the former membership re-organized themselves as FC Krone Cannstatt in 1897 to compete as a football-only side. The new team joined the Süddeutschen Fußballverband (SFV) as a second division club and won promotion in 1904. Krone possessed their own ground, which still exists today as the home of TSV Münster.

Following the 1912 merger of these two clubs, the combined side played at first in the Kreisliga Württemberg and then in the Bezirksliga Württemberg-Baden, earning a number of top three finishes and claiming a title there in 1927. The club also made several appearances in the final rounds of the SFV in the late 1920s and early 1930s.

=== 1930s and 1940s ===
In 1933, VfB moved to Neckar Stadium, the site of its current ground. German football was re-organized that same year under the Third Reich into sixteen top-flight divisions called Gauligen. Stuttgart played in the Gauliga Württemberg and won division titles in 1935, 1937, 1938, 1940, and 1943 before the Gauliga system collapsed part way through the 1944–45 season due to World War II. The club had an intense rivalry with Stuttgarter Kickers throughout this period.

VfB's Gauliga titles earned the team entry to the national playoff rounds, with their best result coming in 1935 when they advanced to the final where they lost 4–6 to defending champions Schalke 04, the dominant side of the era. After a third-place result at the national level in 1937, Stuttgart was not able to advance out of the preliminary rounds in subsequent appearances.

=== Successes through the 1950s ===
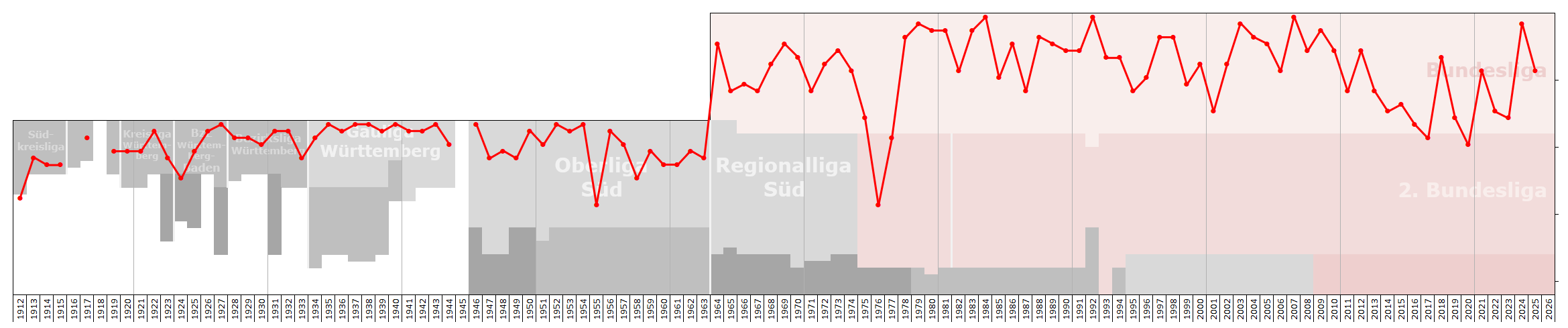
Historical chart of Stuttgart league performance

VfB continued to play first division football in the Oberliga Süd, capturing titles in 1946, 1952, and 1954. They made regular appearances in the German championship rounds, emerging as national champions in 1950 and 1952, finishing as runner-up in 1953, and winning two DFB-Pokal titles in 1954 and 1958. The team which won four titles in eight years was led by Robert Schlienz who had lost his left arm in a car crash. Despite these successes, no player from the Stuttgart squad had a place in the team that won the 1954 FIFA World Cup.

=== Original Bundesligist ===
Due to disappointing results in international competition including the 1958 and 1962 FIFA World Cup, and in response to the growth of professionalism in the sport, the German Football Association (DFB) replaced the regional top flight competitions with a single nationwide professional league in 1963. Stuttgart's consistently solid play through the 1950s earned them a place among the 16 clubs that would make up the original Bundesliga. As an amateur organisation, and due to proverbial Swabian austerity, the club hesitated to spend money, and some players continued to work in an everyday job. Throughout the balance of the decade and until the mid-1970s, the club would generally earn mid-table results.

In 1973, the team qualified for the UEFA Cup for the first time and advanced to the semi-finals of the 1974 tournament where they were eliminated by eventual winners Feyenoord (1–2, 2–2).

=== 1975–2000: Era of president MV ===
VfB Stuttgart was in crisis in the mid-1970s, having missed new trends in football such as club sponsorship. Attempts to catch up with new levels of professionalism by spending money failed. Towards the end of the 1974–75 season, with the team in imminent danger of being relegated to Second Bundesliga, local politician Gerhard Mayer-Vorfelder was elected as new president. However, a draw in the final game of the season meant that VfB would be ranked 16th and lose its Bundesliga status. The first season in the second league, considered the worst in its history, ended with VfB being ranked 11th, having even lost a home game against local rival SSV Reutlingen in front of just 1,200 spectators.

With new coach Jürgen Sundermann and new talents like Karlheinz Förster and Hansi Müller (1975/76-1981/82), the team built around Ottmar Hitzfeld scored one hundred goals in 1976–77 and thus returned to the top-flight after just two seasons.

The young team were renowned for offensive and high-scoring play, but suffered from lack of experience. At the end of 1977–78, VfB was ranked fourth, but the average attendance of over 53,000 set the league record until the 1990s. In 1978/79 they finished second in the Bundesliga. They made another UEFA Cup semi-final appearance in 1980 and delivered a number of top four finishes on their way to their first Bundesliga title – the club's third national title – in the 1983/84 season, now under coach Helmut Benthaus.

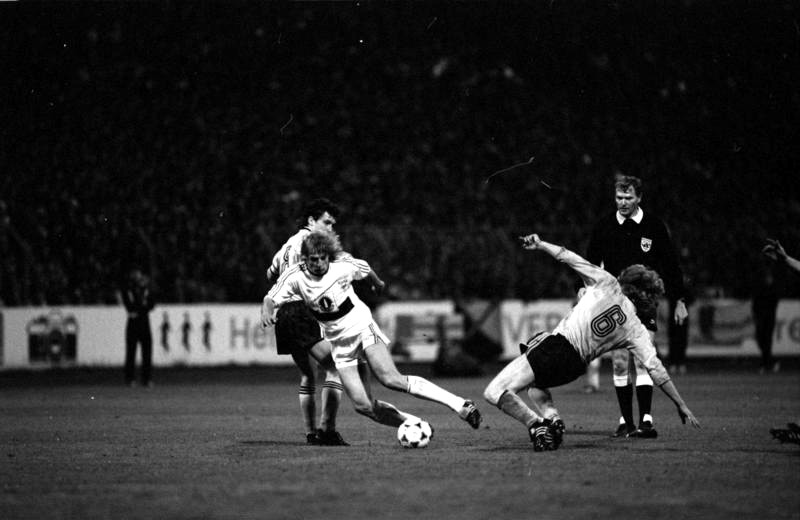
Jürgen Klinsmann (centre) against Dynamo Dresden in the semi-final of the 1988–89 UEFA Cup

In 1986, VfB lost the DFB-Pokal final 2–5 to Bayern Munich. In the 1989 UEFA Cup Final, with Jürgen Klinsmann in their ranks, they lost out to Napoli (1–2, 3–3), where Diego Maradona was playing at the time.

In 1991–92, Stuttgart clinched its fourth title, in one of the closest races in Bundesliga history, finishing ahead of Borussia Dortmund on goal difference. Internationally, they had been eliminated from UEFA Cup play that season (1991–92) after losing their second round match to Spanish side Osasuna (2–3). As national champions, the club qualified to play in the UEFA Champions League in 1992–93, but were eliminated in the first round by Leeds United after a tie-breaking third match in Barcelona which was required due to coach Christoph Daum having substituted a fourth non-German player in the tie's second leg.

VfB did not qualify for any European competition again until 1997, by way of their third German Cup win, with coach Joachim Löw. They advanced to the 1998 European Cup Winners' Cup final, where they lost to Chelsea in what was the penultimate year of the competition. Only one player of the "magic triangle", captain Krassimir Balakov, remained after Giovane Élber and Fredi Bobic left. Löw's contract was not renewed, and he was replaced by Winfried Schäfer, who in turn was sacked after one season.

Stuttgart's performance, however, fell off after this as the club earned just mid-table results over the next two seasons despite spending money on the transfer market and having veterans like Balakov.

=== 2000–2007: The post-MV-era return to success ===
Due to high debts and the lack of results, Gerhard Mayer-Vorfelder finally resigned from VfB in 2000 to take over offices at the DFB, UEFA, and FIFA. New president Manfred Haas had to renegotiate expensive contracts with players who seldom appeared on the field anyway. As in 1976, when Mayer-Vorfelder had taken over, the team had to be rebuilt by relying on talents from the youth teams. The VfB has Germany's most successful program in the German youth Championship.

Coach Ralf Rangnick had started a restructuring of the team that won the Intertoto Cup, but the resulting extra strain of the UEFA Cup participation ended in narrowly escaping from relegation in 2001 by clinching the 15th spot in the league table. Rangnick was replaced by Felix Magath.

With players like Andreas Hinkel, Kevin Kurányi, Timo Hildebrand, and Alexander Hleb earning themselves the nickname "the young and wild", the club soon re-bounded and finished as Bundesliga runners-up in the 2002–03 season. In July 2003, Erwin Staudt became the new president of the club.

==== 2003–04 Champions League ====
VfB qualified for their second Champions League appearance for 2003–04, beating Manchester United and Rangers once and Panathinaikos twice to advance from the group stage as runners-up to Manchester United. They were then matched against Chelsea in the round of 16, falling 0–1 and 0–0 over two legs.

Stuttgart continued to play as one of the top teams in the country, earning fourth and fifth place Bundesliga finishes in 2003–04 and 2004–05 respectively, and again taking part in the UEFA Cup, but without great success. In addition, coach Magath and several players left for another clubs: Kevin Kurányi for Schalke 04, Philipp Lahm for Bayern Munich and Alexander Hleb for Arsenal.

Halfway through the disappointing 2005–06 season, Giovanni Trapattoni was sacked and replaced by Armin Veh. The new coach was designated as a stop-gap due to having resigned from Hansa Rostock in 2003 to focus on his family and having no football job since 2004, save for coaching his home team FC Augsburg for one season. Supported by new manager Horst Heldt, Veh could establish himself and his concept of focusing on promising inexpensive players rather than established stars. Team captain, Zvonimir Soldo, retired, and other veterans left the team that slipped to ninth place and did not qualify for European competition for the first time in four years.

==== Bundesliga champions 2006–07 ====
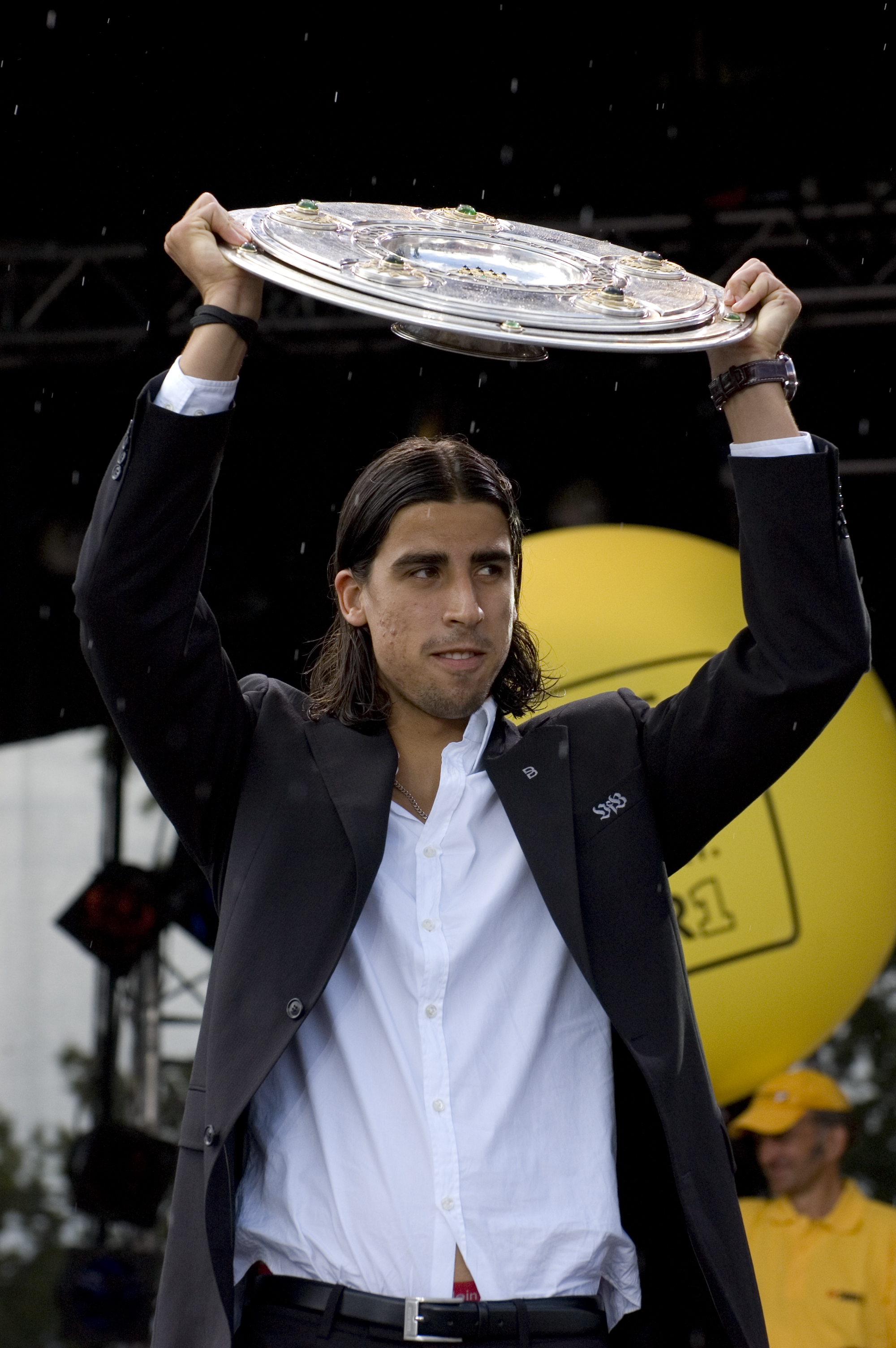
Sami Khedira with the Meisterschale

Despite early-season losses and ensuing criticism in 2006–07, including a 3–0 loss at home to 1. FC Nürnberg, Veh managed to turn the collection of new players like Mexicans Pável Pardo, and Ricardo Osorio, Brazilian Antônio da Silva and fresh local talents, including Mario Gómez, Serdar Tasci, and Sami Khedira, into a strong contender that led the league on 12 November 2006 for the first time in two years. Stuttgart established themselves among the top five and delivered a strong challenge for the Bundesliga title by winning their final eight games. In the penultimate week on 12 May 2007, Stuttgart beat VfL Bochum 3–2 away from home, taking the Bundesliga lead from Schalke 04 and at minimum securing a spot in the 2007–08 Champions League. After trailing 0–1 in the final match of the season against Energie Cottbus, Stuttgart came back to win 2–1 and claim their first Bundesliga title in 15 years. The victory celebrations in Stuttgart, totalling 250,000 people, even topped those of Germany's third place win over Portugal in the 2006 FIFA World Cup.

In addition, VfB had their first ever chance to win the double as they also reached the final of the German Cup for the first time since their victory there ten years former. Their opponents in the cup final in Berlin were 1. FC Nürnberg, a team that had beaten them twice by three goals in regular season, 3–0 and 4–1, and had last won the cup in 1962. With the game level at 1–1 in the first half, Stuttgart's scorer Cacau was sent off. Nürnberg gained a 2–1 lead early in the second half, but the ten men of VfB managed to fight back and equalize. In the second half of extra time, however, with both teams suffering from exhaustion and the humid conditions, Nürnberg scored the winning goal.

=== 2007 to 2018: Decline and two relegations ===
==== 2007–08 UEFA Champions League ====
The 2007–08 UEFA Champions League draw on 30 August 2007 paired the German champions with Spanish giants Barcelona, French champions Lyon and Scottish Old Firm side Rangers. Like in the 2003–04 UEFA Champions League season, Stuttgart's 2007–08 European campaign started with a match at Ibrox Park in Glasgow against Rangers. It ended in a 2–1 defeat. The second match at home against Barcelona was likewise lost, 0–2, as well as the third match, against Lyon at home, with the visitors coming out 2–0 winners from two-second-half strikes. Five defeats and just one win (over Rangers) meant the early exit on the European stage. In the league, they managed to finish in sixth place after a poor start. New German international star Mario Gómez scored 19 goals.

Subsequently, UEFA Cup qualification was ensured in the summer by succeeding in the 2008 UEFA Intertoto Cup.

==== Post-championship seasons 2008–12 ====
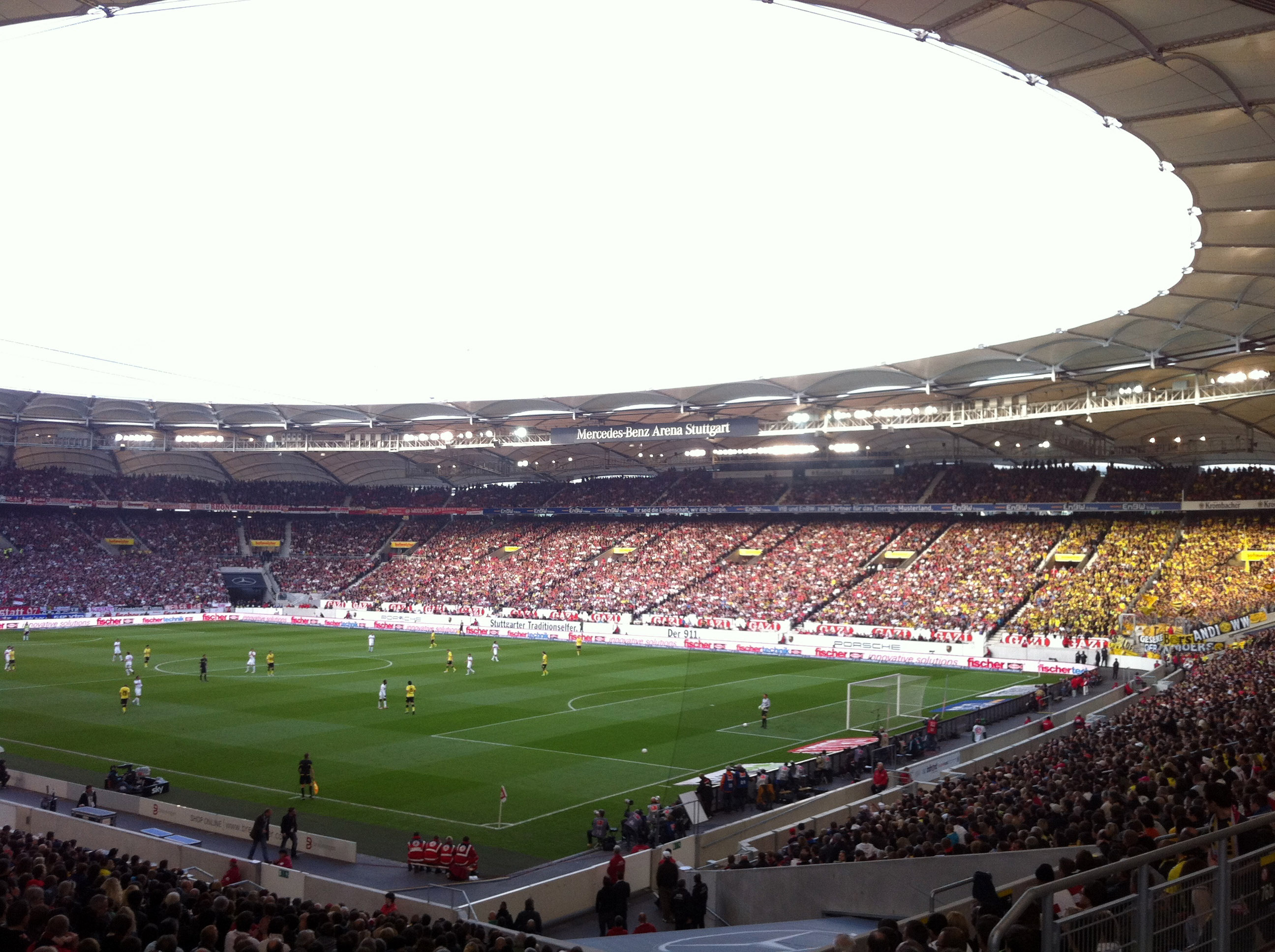
Stuttgart against Borussia Dortmund in 2011

The 2008–09 season, like the one before it, got off to a bad start. After matchday 14 in November, VfB was only 11th in the table and as a result, Armin Veh was sacked and replaced by Markus Babbel. After exiting the German Cup after a 1–5 thrashing from Bayern Munich in January, prospects improved considerably and the team ended third in the table, with second place just being missed after a loss to Bayern on the last matchday. That meant the chance of making the Champions League again.

Internationally, VfB mastered the group stages of the 2008–09 UEFA Cup, but lost to Cup defenders Zenit Saint Petersburg in the round of the last 32 in February.

Stuttgart went into the 2009–10 season with Mario Gómez leaving for Bayern Munich, just as Pavel Pogrebnyak arrived from Zenit Saint Petersburg and Alexander Hleb returning on loan from Barcelona.

On the European level, Stuttgart started the season with a huge success by qualifying for the group stage of the 2009–10 UEFA Champions League. Stuttgart entered that competition for the third time in six years (after 2003 and 2007) by defeating Romanian side Politehnica Timișoara in the Champions League play-off round on 18 and 26 August 2009. VfB were then drawn into Group G against Spanish side Sevilla, Scottish champions Rangers, against whom they had also been drawn against in their previous two Champions League Group stage appearances, and Romanian champions Unirea Urziceni. With two wins (one each against Rangers and Unirea), three draws (one each against all opponents) and a loss (to Sevilla) they managed second spot in the group, thus qualifying for the round of the last 16, where they had to face title holders Barcelona in late winter. After a 1–1 home draw, Stuttgart were eliminated after a 4–0 loss at Camp Nou.

In the 2009–10 DFB-Pokal, they did not proceed further than the last 16 either, losing to second-tier side SpVgg Greuther Fürth. That defeat came in the course of a disappointing first half of the 2009–10 Bundesliga. As a consequence of slipping to 16th spot in December, young coach Markus Babbel was fired after matchday 15 and replaced by the more experienced Swiss Christian Gross. Under his tenure, VfB improved their situation domestically as well as internationally before the winter break. During that break, Thomas Hitzlsperger, Jan Šimák and Ludovic Magnin left the club; Cristian Molinaro was loaned out from Juventus. In the later half of the season, the team – as in the 2008–09 season – were the best performing side of the second half of the Bundesliga, and under Gross they climbed into the upper half of the table and, eventually managed to secure European football for the following season by qualifying for the Europa League.

The 2010–11 season was a mediocre one—after again spending the first half of the season almost always in the relegation zone (17th and 18th spot), with Christian Gross being fired and interim coach Jens Keller taking over for the rest of the first leg, Bruno Labbadia was hired as new coach in January and managed to save VfB from relegation. Eventually, the team finished 12th after a decent second-half performance. In July 2011, Erwin Staudt did not participate again in the election of the president and Gerd E. Mäuser was elected as president.

In the following 2011–12 season, they managed to constantly climb up the table; this was especially thanks to a long unbeaten streak in the spring. Subsequently, VfB qualified for the 2012–13 UEFA Europa League. Key players during that season were Martin Harnik, who scored 17 goals, as well as winger Gōtoku Sakai and forward Vedad Ibišević, who both came to Stuttgart in January 2012.

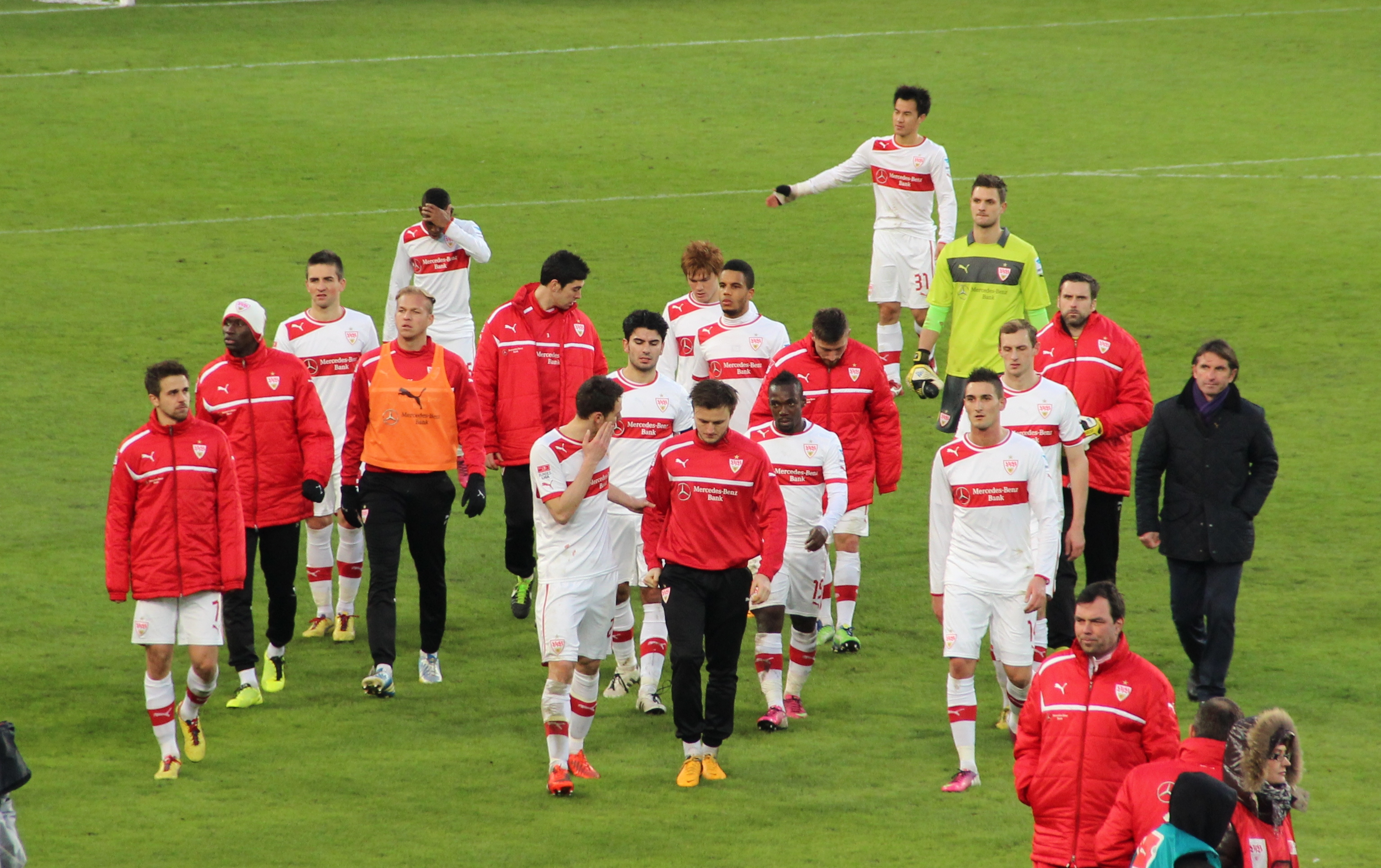
Stuttgart in 2013

With effect from 3 June 2013, Gerd E. Mäuser announced his resignation as president of VfB Stuttgart. On 2 July 2013, the supervisory board of the club named Bernd Wahler as the candidate for the presidential elections. On 22 July 2013, Wahler was elected by 97.4% of the votes cast.

After barely avoiding relegation from the Bundesliga in the 2014–15 season, Stuttgart were relegated to the 2. Bundesliga in the 2015–16 season after finishing in 17th place, having been unable to lift themselves out of the bottom three positions until the end of the season. Following matchday 13, a home match against FC Augsburg and their second consecutive 4–0 loss, Stuttgart decided to terminate Alexander Zorniger's contract and appointed Jürgen Kramny as their manager for an indefinite period. After Stuttgart were relegated to the 2. Bundesliga, Wahler resigned as president on 15 May 2016. Kramny was subsequently sacked as coach.

On 17 May 2016, Jos Luhukay was announced as the new head coach. In July 2016, Jan Schindelmeiser became the sporting director and member of the executive board. Head coach Luhukay resigned on 15 September 2016 and was replaced by Hannes Wolf. At the end of the season, Stuttgart returned to the Bundesliga as the 2. Bundesliga champions. On 22 December 2017, after nearly 10 years since his departure, Bundesliga title winning striker Mario Gomez returned to the team from fellow Bundesliga side VfL Wolfsburg, The team made a solid return season to the Bundesliga, finishing in 7th place. However, they slumped to 16th the following season, eventually ending up relegated via play-offs against Union Berlin.

=== 2019–present: Re-emergence ===
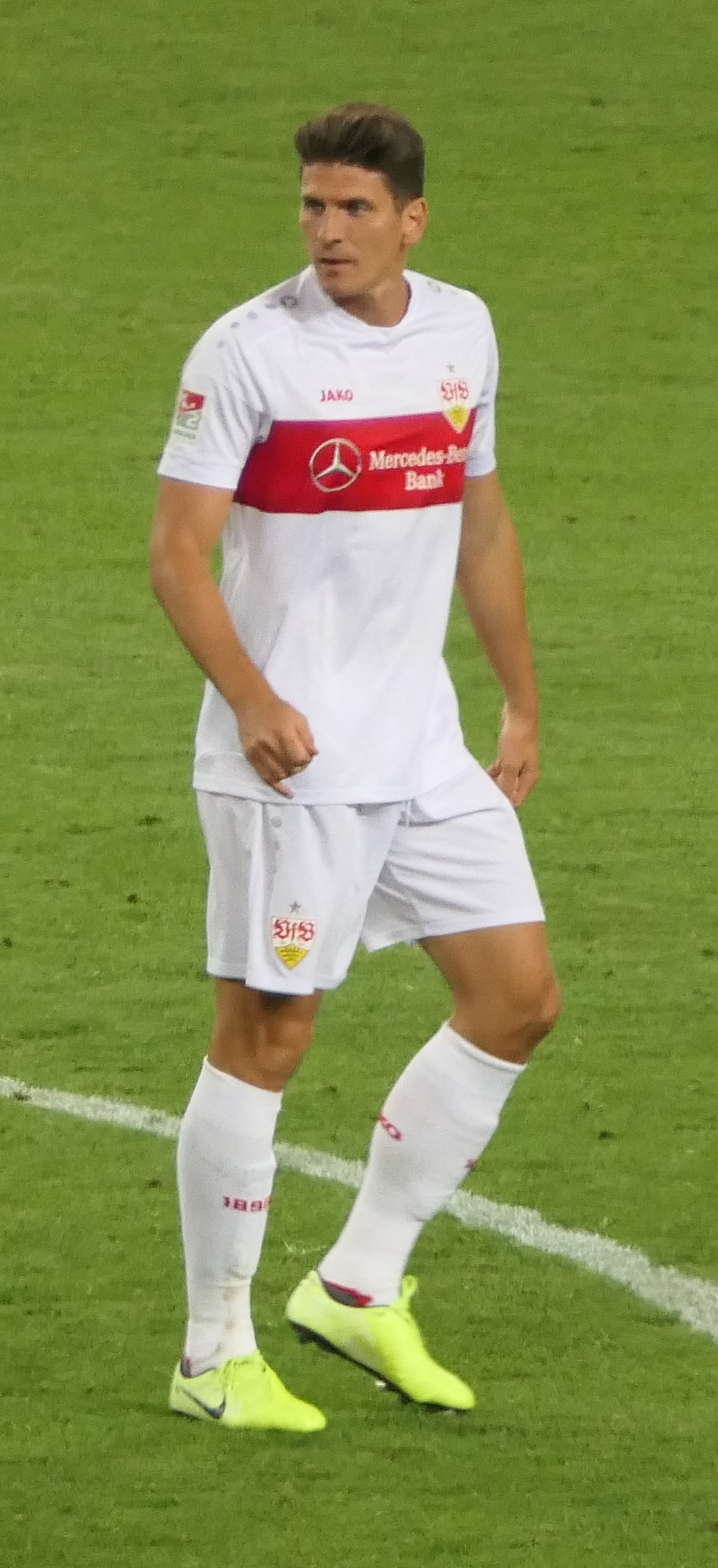
Mario Gómez in 2019

Stuttgart appointed Thomas Hitzlsperger as the sporting CEO, and in April they appointed Sven Mislintat as the sporting director, coming from Borussia Dortmund and Arsenal. In July 2019, Stuttgart was relegated to the second division, and started to rebuild the team. In mid-season, December 2019, former coach Tim Walter was fired and Pellegrino Matarazzo was signed. After one season, Stuttgart returned to the Bundesliga after finishing second in the 2019–20 2. Bundesliga season.

Stuttgart stayed in the Bundesliga in the 2020–21 season, finishing in ninth place in the league. In the 2021–22 season, the team narrowly avoided relegation; a last-minute-win against 1. FC Köln on the last match day guaranteed them a spot in the first league for a third consecutive season. In the 2022–23 season, Stuttgart managed to stay in the Bundesliga for a fourth consecutive season, but again only very closely, with Stuttgart finishing in 16th place and only qualifying for the next season thanks to successful play-offs.

The 2023–24 season for Stuttgart was one of the most successful ones of the club's history. Stuttgart was frequently called "the surprise team of the season". In Bundesliga, they played their best season ever based on the number and rate of victories. They remained in 3rd place of the Bundesliga for most of the matchdays, only behind Leverkusen and Bayern, until they surpassed Bayern Munich on the final matchday to finish as Bundesliga runners-up. It was the club's best performance since winning the league in 2007. They also reached the quarter-finals in the DFB Pokal, where they defeated 1. FC Union Berlin and Borussia Dortmund before losing to eventual winners Bayer Leverkusen 3–2. Strikers Serhou Guirassy and Deniz Undav were among the top goalscorers worldwide, with Guirassy breaking the all-time Stuttgart record of most goals in a season despite missing some games. Deniz Undav, Alexander Nübel, Chris Führich, Maximilian Mittelstädt and Waldemar Anton were nominated for the preliminary squad of the Germany national team for the UEFA Euro 2024, a club record high for number of players ever selected from the club in a major tournament.

The club began 2024–25 season with a 4–3 shootout loss in the 2024 DFL-Supercup to Leverkusen after a 2–2 draw in regular time, a competition they qualified for due to finishing second in the league the previous season. They were unable to repeat the heroics of the previous season, as the club finished in ninth, even setting a miserable club record of six straight defeats in Bundesliga home games. They finished 26th in the 2024–25 UEFA Champions League league phase, missing out on knockout playoffs after a 4–1 defeat to PSG on final matchday. Their Champions League campaign included a 1–0 away win against Juventus FC. However, the club still qualified for Europe as they broke an 18-year long trophy drought by winning the 2024–25 DFB-Pokal, winning 4–2 against third-tier side Arminia Bielefeld in the final, which qualified them for 2025–26 UEFA Europa League and for hosting the newly renamed Franz Beckenbauer Supercup against league winners Bayern Munich in the 2025 edition.

== Kits ==
| For a complete development see VfB Stuttgart kits |

- Current sports brand: Jako.
- Home uniform: White shirt with a horizontal red stripe, white shorts and white socks.
- Alternative uniform: Red shirt, red shorts and red socks.
- Third uniform: Dark green or yellow shirt, dark green or yellow shorts and dark green or yellow socks.

| First | (See evolution) | Currently |

=== Kit suppliers and shirt sponsors ===
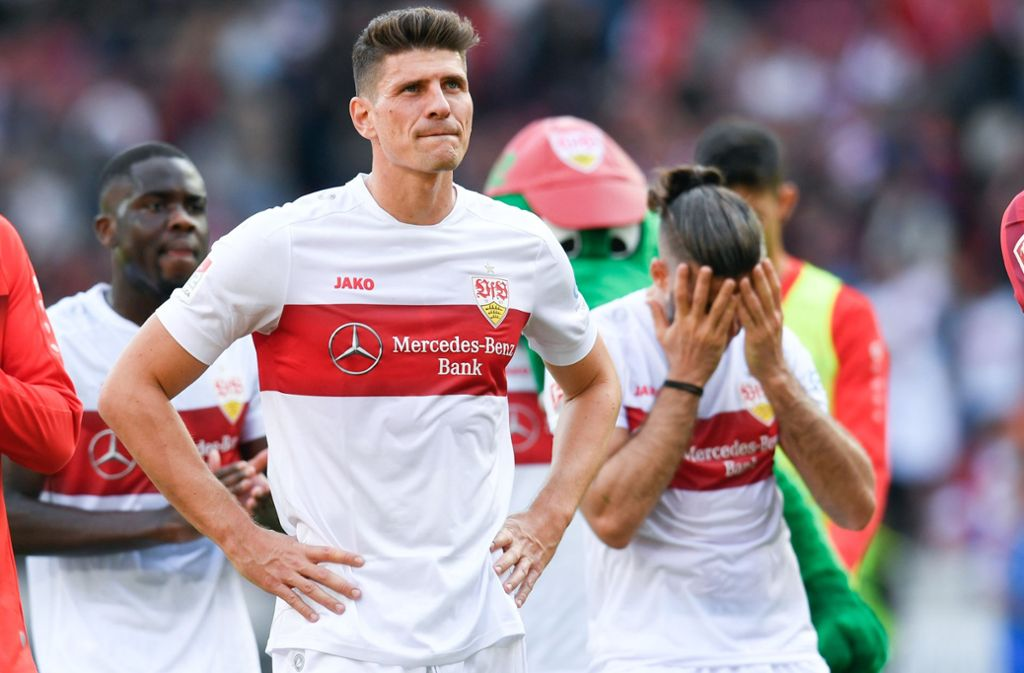
Kit used in 2019 season featuring German international star Mario Gómez

| Period | Kit manufacturers | Shirt sponsor | Sleeve sponsor |
|---|---|---|---|
| 1975–1976 | Adidas | None | None |
| 1976–1977 | Adidas | Frottesana | None |
| 1977–1978 | Erima | Frottesana | None |
| 1978–1979 | Adidas | Frottesana | None |
| 1979–1980 | Erima | Canon | None |
| 1980–1982 | Adidas | Canon | None |
| 1982–1986 | Adidas | Dinkelacker | None |
| 1986–1987 | Adidas | Sanwald Extra | None |
| 1987–1997 | Adidas | Südmilch | None |
| 1997–1999 | Adidas | Göttinger Gruppe | None |
| 1999–2002 | Adidas | Debitel | None |
| 2002–2005 | Puma | Debitel | None |
| 2005–2010 | Puma | EnBW | None |
| 2010–2012 | Puma | GAZİ | None |
| 2012–2017 | Puma | Mercedes-Benz Bank | None |
| 2017–2019 | Puma | Mercedes-Benz Bank | GAZİ |
| 2019–2023 | Jako | Mercedes-Benz Bank | Mercedes-EQ |
| 2023–2025 | Jako | Winamax | hep Global |
| 2025– | Jako | Landesbank Baden-Württemberg | hep Global |

== Crest ==
Badge of Stuttgarter FV 93 (1893–1912)

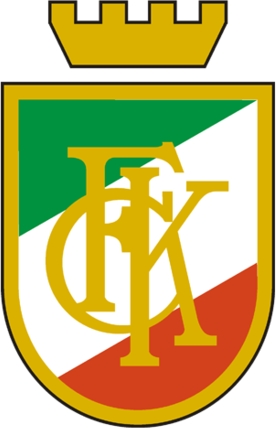
Badge of FC Krone Cannstatt (1897–1912)

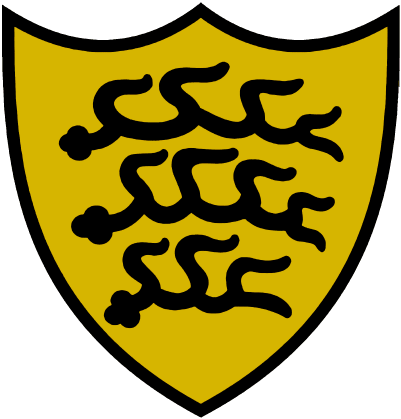
Badge of VfB Stuttgart (1912–1949)

Badge of VfB Stuttgart (1994–2014)

Badge of VfB Stuttgart (1949–1994, 2014–)

== Stadium ==
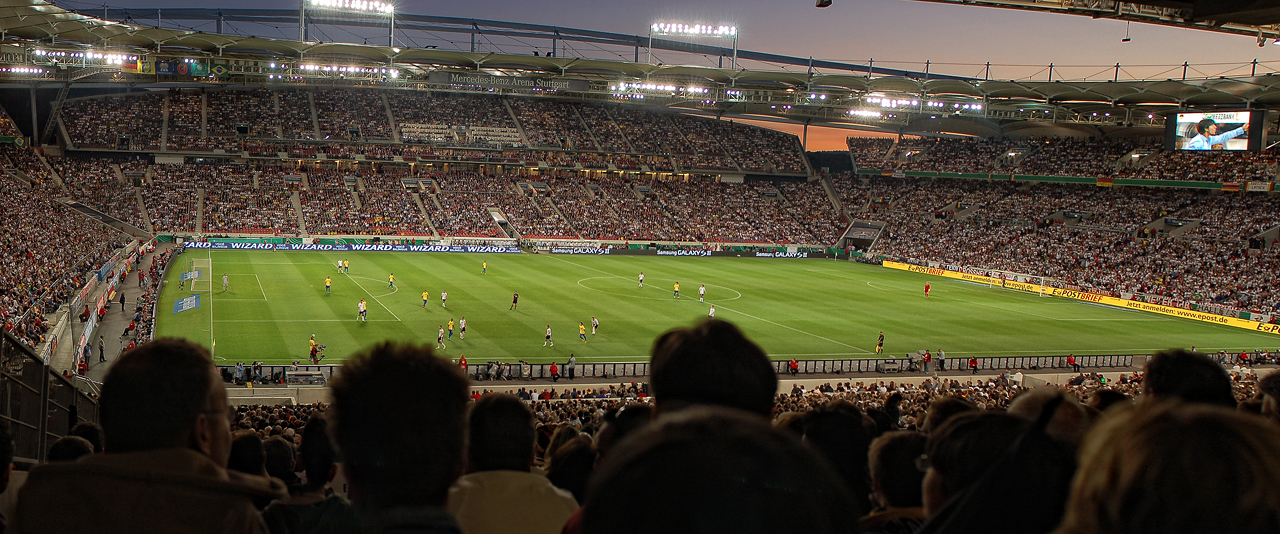
The MHPArena

The home ground of VfB Stuttgart is the MHPArena which was originally built in 1933. It lies close to the River Neckar on Bad Cannstatt's Mercedesstraße near the new Mercedes-Benz Museum and Mercedes-Benz factory. After being renovated several times, the stadium was able to hold a maximum capacity of 55,896 spectators (50,000 for international matches). For the 1974 FIFA World Cup, the Gottlieb-Daimler-Stadion (its original name) was one of the venues for the 2006 FIFA World Cup, hosting five preliminary round matches, a first knockout round match (England vs. Ecuador) and the third place play-off (Germany vs. Portugal). From the 2008–09 season, the stadium was named the Mercedes-Benz-Arena, starting with a pre-season friendly against Arsenal on 30 July 2008. The stadium recently went through extensive restructuring and rebuilding as it was being converted into a pure football arena. In 2011, the capacity was increased to 60,449.

== Rivalries, friendships and cooperations ==
The longest rivalry of VfB is the city rivalry with Stuttgarter Kickers (Die Roten/Reds against Die Blauen/Blues). However, the respective first teams of the two clubs have not played each other since Kickers were relegated to the 2. Bundesliga in 1992. Thus, this derby has increasingly been overtaken in importance by the Baden-Württemberg-Derby between VfB and Karlsruher SC. In this derby, old Badenese-Württembergian animosities are played out. The rivalry with Bavarian side Bayern Munich ("Süd-/South Derby") is mainly one-sided, as VfB fans maintain animosity towards Bayern for buying some of Stuttgart's best players and coaches in recent years, such as Giovane Élber, Felix Magath, Mario Gómez, and Benjamin Pavard.

Regional friendships exist between VfB and the South Württemberg side SSV Reutlingen 05 (the "little brother" of VfB) as well as with North Württembergers SpVgg Ludwigsburg but also with Heidenheim. On a national level, supporters groups of VfB used to be closely connected with those of Energie Cottbus, 1. FC Saarbrücken, Bayer Leverkusen and Eintracht Frankfurt. All of these supporter group friendships have been discontinued by today or are only maintained by few supporter groups. Current ultras friendships are with the ultras of SSV Reutlingen 05, 1. FC Kaiserslautern and Italian club Cesena.

In 2005, a cooperation treaty between VfB and Swiss Super League side St. Gallen was signed, with particular emphasis on the youth sectors of both clubs.

== Honours ==
=== National ===
- German Championship/Bundesliga
  - Champions: 1950, 1952, 1983–84, 1991–92, 2006–07
  - Runners-up: 1935, 1953, 1978–79, 2002–03, 2023–24
- 2. Bundesliga
  - Winners: 1976–77, 2016–17
  - Runners-up: 2019–20
- DFB-Pokal
  - Winners: 1953–54, 1957–58, 1996–97, 2024–25
  - Runners-up: 1985–86, 2006–07, 2012–13, 2025–26
- DFB/DFL-Supercup
  - Winners: 1992
  - Runners-up: 2024, 2025
- DFL-Ligapokal
  - Runners-up: 1997, 1998, 2005

=== International ===
- UEFA Cup
  - Runners-up: 1988–89
- UEFA Cup Winners' Cup
  - Runners-up: 1997–98
- UEFA Intertoto Cup
  - Winners: 2000, 2002 (shared record)

=== Pre-season ===
- Fuji-Cup
  - Winners: 1989
- Uhrencup
  - Winners: 2010

=== Regional ===
- Oberliga Süd
  - Winners: 1945–46, 1951–52, 1953–54
- 2nd Bundesliga Süd
  - Winners: 1977
- Bezirksliga Württemberg-Baden
  - Winners: 1926–27, 1929–30
- Gauliga Württemberg
  - Winners: 1934–35, 1936–37, 1937–38, 1942–43

=== Reserve team ===
- German amateur champions: 1962–63, 1979–80

=== Youth ===
- German Under 19 championship
  - Champions: 1972–73, 1974–75, 1980–81, 1983–84, 1987–88, 1988–89, 1989–90, 1990–91, 2002–03, 2004–05 (record)
  - Runners-up: 1971–72, 1976–77, 1981–82, 1998–99, 2001–02, 2018–19
- Under 19 Bundesliga Division South/Southwest
  - Champions: 2004–05, 2007–08, 2009–10, 2018–19
- Under 19 Juniors DFB-Pokal
  - Winners: 1996–97, 2000–01, 2018–19, 2021–22, 2025–26
  - Runners-up: 2001–02
- German Under 17 championship
  - Champions: 1985–86, 1993–94, 1994–95, 1998–99, 2003–04, 2008–09, 2012–13, 2025–26
  - Runners-up: 1987–88, 1989–90, 1997–98, 2001–02, 2002–03, 2011–12, 2014–15, 2021–22
- Under 17 Bundesliga Division South/Southwest
  - Champions: 2010–11, 2012–13, 2014–15, 2015–16, 2021–22

== European record ==
Scores and results list Stuttgart's goal tally first.

| Competition | Round | Country | Opponent | Home | Away | Aggregate |
|---|---|---|---|---|---|---|
| 1964–65 Inter-Cities Fairs Cup | First round | Denmark | B 1913 | 1–0 | 3–1 | 4–1 |
| 1964–65 Inter-Cities Fairs Cup | Second round | Scotland | Dunfermline Athletic | 0–0 | 0–1 | 0–1 |
| 1965–66 Inter-Cities Fairs Cup | First round | England | Burnley | 1–1 | 0–2 | 1–3 |
| 1969–70 Inter-Cities Fairs Cup | Round of 64 | Sweden | Malmö FF | 3–0 | 1–1 | 4–1 |
| 1969–70 Inter-Cities Fairs Cup | Round of 32 | Italy | Napoli | 0–0 | 0–1 | 0–1 |
| 1973–74 UEFA Cup | Round of 64 | Cyprus | Olympiakos Nicosia | 9–0 | 4–0 | 13–0 |
| 1973–74 UEFA Cup | Round of 32 | Czechoslovakia | Tatran Prešov | 3–1 | 5–3 | 8–4 |
| 1973–74 UEFA Cup | Round of 16 | Soviet Union | Dynamo Kyiv | 3–0 | 0–2 | 3–2 |
| 1973–74 UEFA Cup | Quarter-final | Portugal | Vitória de Setúbal | 1–0 | 2–2 | 3–2 |
| 1973–74 UEFA Cup | Semi-final | Netherlands | Feyenoord | 2–2 | 1–2 | 3–4 |
| 1978–79 UEFA Cup | Round of 64 | Switzerland | Basel | 4–1 | 3–2 | 7–3 |
| 1978–79 UEFA Cup | Round of 32 | Soviet Union | Torpedo Moscow | 2–0 | 1–2 | 3–2 |
| 1978–79 UEFA Cup | Round of 16 | Czechoslovakia | Dukla Prague | 4–1 | 0–4 | 4–5 |
| 1979–80 UEFA Cup | Round of 64 | Italy | Torino | 1–0 | 1–2 | 2–2 (a) |
| 1979–80 UEFA Cup | Round of 32 | East Germany | Dynamo Dresden | 0–0 | 1–1 | 1–1 (a) |
| 1979–80 UEFA Cup | Round of 16 | Switzerland | Grasshoppers | 3–0 | 2–0 | 5–0 |
| 1979–80 UEFA Cup | Quarter-final | Bulgaria | Lokomotiv Sofia | 3–1 | 1–0 | 4–1 |
| 1979–80 UEFA Cup | Semi-final | West Germany | Borussia Mönchengladbach | 2–1 | 0–2 | 2–3 |
| 1980–81 UEFA Cup | Round of 64 | Cyprus | Pezoporikos Larnaca | 6–0 | 4–1 | 10–1 |
| 1980–81 UEFA Cup | Round of 32 | East Germany | Vorwärts Frankfurt | 5–1 | 2–1 | 7–2 |
| 1980–81 UEFA Cup | Round of 16 | West Germany | 1. FC Köln | 3–1 | 1–4 | 4–5 |
| 1981–82 UEFA Cup | Round of 64 | Yugoslavia | Hajduk Split | 2–2 | 1–3 | 3–5 |
| 1983–84 UEFA Cup | Round of 64 | Bulgaria | Levski-Spartak Sofia | 1–1 | 0–1 | 1–2 |
| 1984–85 European Cup | Round of 64 | Bulgaria | Levski-Spartak Sofia | 1–1 | 2–2 | 3–3 (a) |
| 1986–87 Cup Winners' Cup | Round of 32 | Czechoslovakia | Spartak Trnava | 1–0 | 0–0 | 1–0 |
| 1986–87 Cup Winners' Cup | Round of 16 | Soviet Union | Torpedo Moscow | 3–5 | 0–2 | 3–7 |
| 1988–89 UEFA Cup | Round of 64 | Hungary | Tatabányai Bányász | 2–0 | 1–2 | 3–2 |
| 1988–89 UEFA Cup | Round of 32 | Yugoslavia | Dinamo Zagreb | 1–1 | 3–1 | 4–2 |
| 1988–89 UEFA Cup | Round of 16 | Netherlands | Groningen | 2–0 | 3–1 | 5–1 |
| 1988–89 UEFA Cup | Quarter-final | Spain | Real Sociedad | 1–0 | 0–1 | 1–1 (4–2 p) |
| 1988–89 UEFA Cup | Semi-final | East Germany | Dynamo Dresden | 1–0 | 1–1 | 2–1 |
| 1988–89 UEFA Cup | Final | Italy | Napoli | 3–3 | 1–2 | 4–5 |
| 1989–90 UEFA Cup | Round of 64 | Netherlands | Feyenoord | 2–0 | 1–2 | 3–2 |
| 1989–90 UEFA Cup | Round of 32 | Soviet Union | Zenit Saint Petersburg | 5–0 | 1–0 | 6–0 |
| 1989–90 UEFA Cup | Round of 16 | Belgium | Antwerp | 1–1 | 0–1 | 1–2 |
| 1991–92 UEFA Cup | Round of 64 | Hungary | Pécsi MFC | 4–1 | 2–2 | 6–3 |
| 1991–92 UEFA Cup | Round of 32 | Spain | Osasuna | 2–3 | 0–0 | 2–3 |
| 1992–93 Champions League | First round | England | Leeds United | 3–0 | 1–4 | 4–4 (1–2 p/o) |
| 1997–98 Cup Winners' Cup | Round of 32 | Iceland | ÍBV | 2–1 | 3–1 | 5–2 |
| 1997–98 Cup Winners' Cup | Round of 16 | Belgium | Germinal Ekeren | 2–4 | 4–0 | 6–4 |
| 1997–98 Cup Winners' Cup | Quarter-final | Czech Republic | Slavia Prague | 2–0 | 1–1 | 3–1 |
| 1997–98 Cup Winners' Cup | Semi-final | Russia | Lokomotiv Moscow | 2–1 | 1–0 | 3–1 |
| 1997–98 Cup Winners' Cup | Final | England | Chelsea | 0–1 | | |
| 1998–99 UEFA Cup | Round of 64 | Netherlands | Feyenoord | 1–3 | 3–0 | 4–3 |
| 1998–99 UEFA Cup | Round of 32 | Belgium | Club Brugge | 1–1 | 2–3 | 3–4 |
| 2000–01 UEFA Cup | First round | Scotland | Heart of Midlothian | 1–0 | 2–3 | 3–3 (a) |
| 2000–01 UEFA Cup | Second round | Austria | Tirol Innsbruck | 3–1 | 0–1 | 3–2 |
| 2000–01 UEFA Cup | Round of 32 | Netherlands | Feyenoord | 2–1 | 2–2 | 4–3 |
| 2000–01 UEFA Cup | Round of 16 | Spain | Celta Vigo | 0–0 | 1–2 | 1–2 |
| 2002–03 UEFA Cup | First round | Latvia | Ventspils | 4–1 | 4–1 | 8–2 |
| 2002–03 UEFA Cup | Second round | Hungary | Ferencváros | 2–0 | 0–0 | 2–0 |
| 2002–03 UEFA Cup | Round of 32 | Belgium | Club Brugge | 1–0 | 2–1 | 3–1 |
| 2002–03 UEFA Cup | Round of 16 | Scotland | Celtic | 3–2 | 1–3 | 4–5 |
| 2003–04 Champions League | Group stage | Scotland | Rangers | 1–0 | 1–2 | 2nd |
| 2003–04 Champions League | Group stage | England | Manchester United | 2–1 | 0–2 | 2nd |
| 2003–04 Champions League | Group stage | Greece | Panathinaikos | 2–0 | 3–1 | 2nd |
| 2003–04 Champions League | Round of 16 | England | Chelsea | 0–1 | 0–0 | 0–1 |
| 2004–05 UEFA Cup | First round | Hungary | Újpest | 4–0 | 3–1 | 7–1 |
| 2004–05 UEFA Cup | Group stage | Belgium | Beveren | | 5–1 | 1st |
| 2004–05 UEFA Cup | Group stage | Portugal | Benfica | 3–1 | | 1st |
| 2004–05 UEFA Cup | Group stage | Netherlands | Heerenveen | | 0–1 | 1st |
| 2004–05 UEFA Cup | Group stage | Croatia | Dinamo Zagreb | 2–1 | | 1st |
| 2004–05 UEFA Cup | Round of 32 | Italy | Parma | 0–2 | 0–0 | 0–2 |
| 2005–06 UEFA Cup | First round | Slovenia | Domžale | 2–0 | 0–1 | 2–1 |
| 2005–06 UEFA Cup | Group stage | France | Rennes | | 2–0 | 3rd |
| 2005–06 UEFA Cup | Group stage | Ukraine | Shakhtar Donetsk | 0–2 | | 3rd |
| 2005–06 UEFA Cup | Group stage | Greece | PAOK | | 2–1 | 3rd |
| 2005–06 UEFA Cup | Group stage | Romania | Rapid București | 2–1 | | 3rd |
| 2005–06 UEFA Cup | Round of 32 | England | Middlesbrough | 1–2 | 1–0 | 2–2 (a) |
| 2007–08 Champions League | Group stage | Scotland | Rangers | 3–2 | 1–2 | 4th |
| 2007–08 Champions League | Group stage | Spain | Barcelona | 0–2 | 1–3 | 4th |
| 2007–08 Champions League | Group stage | France | Lyon | 0–2 | 2–4 | 4th |
| 2008–09 UEFA Cup | Second qualifying round | Hungary | Győri ETO | 2–1 | 4–1 | 6–2 |
| 2008–09 UEFA Cup | First round | Bulgaria | Cherno More Varna | 2–2 | 2–1 | 4–3 |
| 2008–09 UEFA Cup | Group stage | Spain | Sevilla | | 0–2 | 2nd |
| 2008–09 UEFA Cup | Group stage | Serbia | Partizan | 2–0 | | 2nd |
| 2008–09 UEFA Cup | Group stage | Italy | Sampdoria | | 1–1 | 2nd |
| 2008–09 UEFA Cup | Group stage | Belgium | Standard Liège | 3–0 | | 2nd |
| 2008–09 UEFA Cup | Round of 32 | Russia | Zenit Saint Petersburg | 1–2 | 1–2 | 2–4 |
| 2009–10 Champions League | Third qualifying round | Romania | Politehnica Timișoara | 0–0 | 2–0 | 2–0 |
| 2009–10 Champions League | Group stage | Scotland | Rangers | 1–1 | 2–0 | 2nd |
| 2009–10 Champions League | Group stage | Spain | Sevilla | 1–3 | 1–1 | 2nd |
| 2009–10 Champions League | Group stage | Romania | Unirea Urziceni | 3–1 | 1–1 | 2nd |
| 2009–10 Champions League | Round of 16 | Spain | Barcelona | 1–1 | 0–4 | 1–5 |
| 2010–11 Europa League | Third qualifying round | Norway | Molde | 2–2 | 3–2 | 5–4 |
| 2010–11 Europa League | Play-off round | Slovakia | Slovan Bratislava | 2–2 | 1–0 | 3–2 |
| 2010–11 Europa League | Group stage | Switzerland | Young Boys | 3–0 | 2–4 | 1st |
| 2010–11 Europa League | Group stage | Spain | Getafe | 1–0 | 3–0 | 1st |
| 2010–11 Europa League | Group stage | Denmark | Odense | 5–1 | 2–1 | 1st |
| 2010–11 Europa League | Round of 32 | Portugal | Benfica | 0–2 | 1–2 | 1–4 |
| 2012–13 Europa League | Play-off round | Russia | Dynamo Moscow | 2–0 | 1–1 | 3–1 |
| 2012–13 Europa League | Group stage | Romania | FCSB | 2–2 | 5–1 | 2nd |
| 2012–13 Europa League | Group stage | Norway | Molde | 0–1 | 0–2 | 2nd |
| 2012–13 Europa League | Group stage | Denmark | Copenhagen | 0–0 | 2–0 | 2nd |
| 2012–13 Europa League | Round of 32 | Belgium | Genk | 1–1 | 2–0 | 3–1 |
| 2012–13 Europa League | Round of 16 | Italy | Lazio | 0–2 | 1–3 | 1–5 |
| 2013–14 Europa League | Third qualifying round | Bulgaria | Botev Plovdiv | 0–0 | 1–1 | 1–1 (a) |
| 2013–14 Europa League | Play-off round | Croatia | Rijeka | 2–2 | 1–2 | 3–4 |
| 2024–25 Champions League | League phase | Spain | Real Madrid | | 1–3 | 26th |
| 2024–25 Champions League | League phase | Czech Republic | Sparta Prague | 1–1 | | 26th |
| 2024–25 Champions League | League phase | Italy | Juventus | | 1–0 | 26th |
| 2024–25 Champions League | League phase | Italy | Atalanta | 0–2 | | 26th |
| 2024–25 Champions League | League phase | Serbia | Red Star Belgrade | | 1–5 | 26th |
| 2024–25 Champions League | League phase | Switzerland | Young Boys | 5–1 | | 26th |
| 2024–25 Champions League | League phase | Slovakia | Slovan Bratislava | | 3–1 | 26th |
| 2024–25 Champions League | League phase | France | Paris Saint-Germain | 1–4 | | 26th |
| 2025–26 Europa League | League phase | Spain | Celta Vigo | 2–1 | | 11th |
| 2025–26 Europa League | League phase | Switzerland | Basel | | 0–2 | 11th |
| 2025–26 Europa League | League phase | Turkey | Fenerbahçe | | 0–1 | 11th |
| 2025–26 Europa League | League phase | Netherlands | Feyenoord | 2–0 | | 11th |
| 2025–26 Europa League | League phase | Netherlands | Go Ahead Eagles | | 4–0 | 11th |
| 2025–26 Europa League | League phase | Israel | Maccabi Tel Aviv | 4–1 | | 11th |
| 2025–26 Europa League | League phase | Italy | Roma | | 0–2 | 11th |
| 2025–26 Europa League | League phase | Switzerland | Young Boys | 3–2 | | 11th |
| 2025–26 Europa League | Knockout phase play-off | Scotland | Celtic | 0–1 | 4–1 | 4–2 |
| 2025–26 Europa League | Round of 16 | Portugal | Porto | 1–2 | 0–2 | 1–4 |
| 2026–27 Champions League | League phase | Norway | Viking | 3–1 | | |
| 2026–27 Champions League | League phase | Slovakia | Slovan Bratislava | | 3–0 | |
| 2026–27 Champions League | League phase | Spain | Atlético Madrid | 1–1 | | |
| 2026–27 Champions League | League phase | Turkey | Galatasaray | | 0-2 | |
| 2026–27 Champions League | League phase | Italy | Inter Milan | | | |
| 2026–27 Champions League | League phase | France | Lille | | | |
| 2026–27 Champions League | League phase | Belgium | Club Brugge | | | |
| 2026–27 Champions League | League phase | Netherlands | PSV Eindhoven | | | |

== Club management ==
| Position | Name |
|---|---|
| Interim President (since 1 August 2024) | Dietmar Allgaier |
| Chairman, Executive board representative for Strategy and Communications | Alexander Wehrle |
| Executive board representative for Sport | Fabian Wohlgemuth |
| Executive board representative for Finances, Administration and Operations | Thomas Ignatzi |
| Executive board representative for Marketing and Distribution | Rouven Kasper |

== Players ==
=== Current squad ===
As of 12 September 2026

Note: Flags indicate national team as defined under FIFA eligibility rules; some limited exceptions apply. Players may hold more than one non-FIFA nationality.

| No. | Pos. | Nation | Player |
|---|---|---|---|
| 1 | GK | GER | Fabian Bredlow |
| 2 | DF | BEL | Ameen Al-Dakhil |
| 3 | DF | NED | Ramon Hendriks |
| 4 | DF | GER | Josha Vagnoman |
| 6 | MF | GER | Angelo Stiller |
| 7 | DF | GER | Maximilian Mittelstädt |
| 8 | FW | POR | Tiago Tomás |
| 9 | FW | BIH | Ermedin Demirović |
| 10 | MF | GER | Chris Führich |
| 11 | MF | MAR | Bilal El Khannouss |
| 14 | DF | SUI | Luca Jaquez |
| 16 | MF | TUR | Atakan Karazor |
| 17 | FW | GER | Dženan Pejčinović |
| 18 | FW | GER | Jamie Leweling |
| 20 | DF | SUI | Leonidas Stergiou |

| No. | Pos. | Nation | Player |
|---|---|---|---|
| 21 | MF | GER | Grischa Prömel |
| 22 | DF | FRA | Lorenz Assignon |
| 23 | DF | FRA | Dan-Axel Zagadou |
| 24 | DF | GER | Jeff Chabot |
| 26 | FW | GER | Deniz Undav (captain) |
| 28 | MF | DEN | Nikolas Nartey |
| 29 | DF | GER | Finn Jeltsch |
| 31 | FW | GER | Justin Diehl |
| 33 | GK | GER | Marius Funk |
| 39 | MF | GER | Ertuğrul Yiğit |
| 41 | GK | GER | Dennis Seimen |
| 43 | FW | GER | Jarzinho Malanga |
| 44 | FW | SVK | Leo Sauer |
| 46 | GK | GER | Stefan Drljača |
| 47 | MF | AUT | Yanik Spalt |

=== Out on loan ===
Note: Flags indicate national team as defined under FIFA eligibility rules; some limited exceptions apply. Players may hold more than one non-FIFA nationality.

| No. | Pos. | Nation | Player |
|---|---|---|---|
| — | GK | GER | Florian Hellstern (at Greuther Fürth until 30 June 2027) |
| — | MF | GER | Mirza Catovic (at Barcelona B until 30 June 2027) |
| — | MF | GER | Noah Darvich (at SV Elversberg until 30 June 2027) |
| — | MF | GER | Yannik Keitel (at FC Augsburg until 30 June 2027) |

| No. | Pos. | Nation | Player |
|---|---|---|---|
| — | MF | GER | Laurin Ulrich (at SC Paderborn until 30 June 2027) |
| — | FW | ECU | Jeremy Arévalo (at Estrela da Amadora until 30 June 2027) |
| — | FW | ALG | Badredine Bouanani (at Rangers until 30 June 2027) |

== Past players ==
=== Notable former players ===
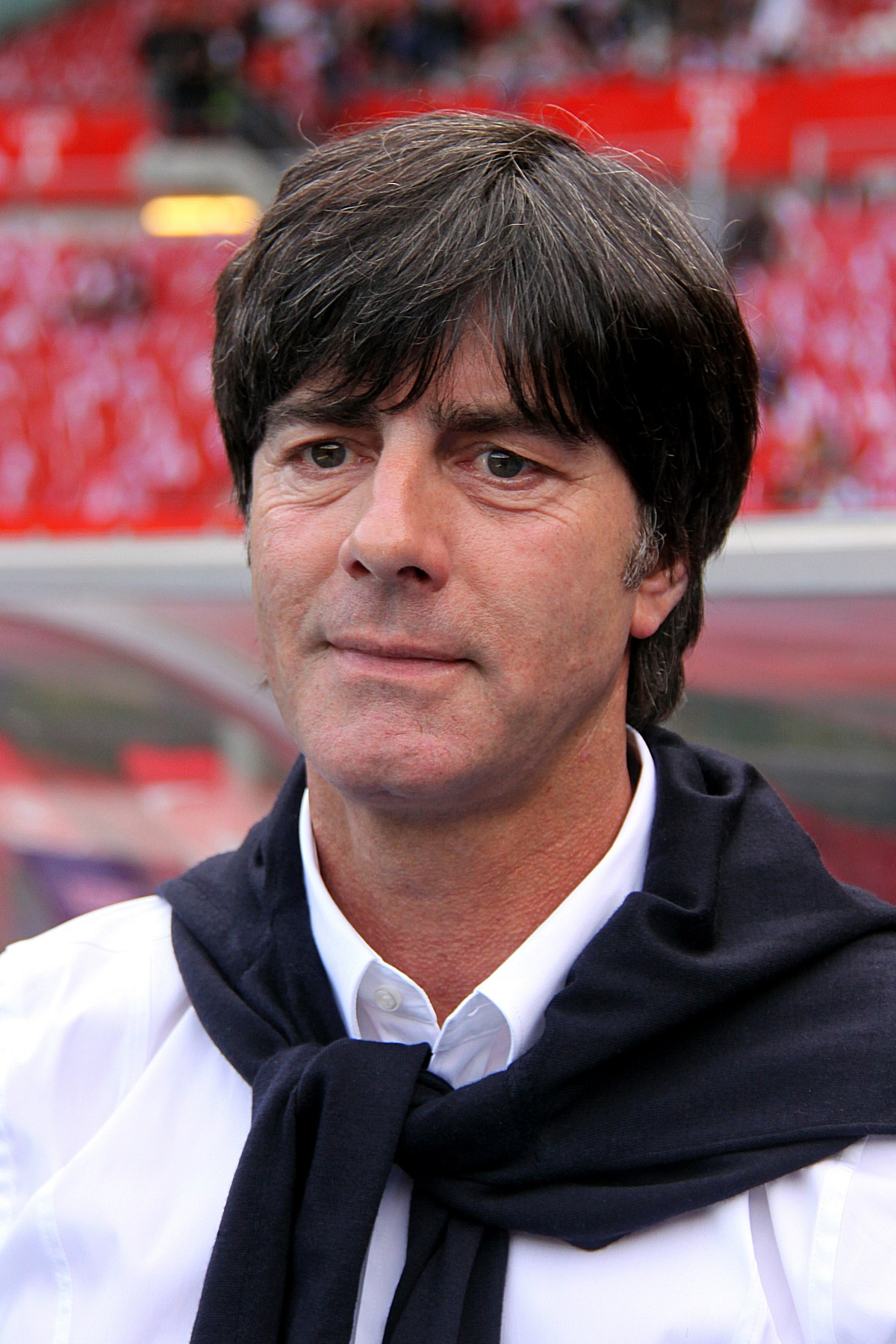
Joachim Löw was chosen as the head coach of VfB Stuttgart's "Centenary Eleven".

In the year 2012, for the 100th anniversary of the merger of FV Stuttgart and Kronen-Klub Cannstatt, the supporters voted for Jahrhundert-Elf, the "Centenary Eleven":

Note: Flags indicate national team as defined under FIFA eligibility rules; some limited exceptions apply. Players may hold more than one non-FIFA nationality.

| No. | Pos. | Nation | Player |
|---|---|---|---|
| — | GK | GER | Timo Hildebrand |
| — | DF | GER | Karlheinz Förster |
| — | DF | GER | Günther Schäfer |
| — | DF | BRA | Marcelo Bordon |
| — | MF | BUL | Krasimir Balakov |
| — | MF | GER | Guido Buchwald |

| No. | Pos. | Nation | Player |
|---|---|---|---|
| — | MF | GER | Karl Allgöwer |
| — | MF | GER | Sami Khedira |
| — | MF | GER | Robert Schlienz |
| — | FW | GER | Jürgen Klinsmann |
| — | FW | BRA | Giovane Élber |

=== Records ===
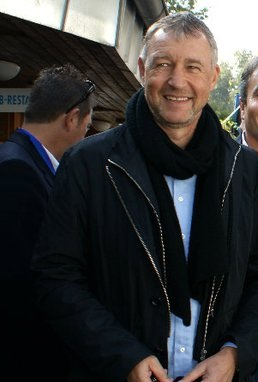
Karl Allgöwer scored the most goals in VfB Stuttgart's history.

Most Stuttgart appearances
| Rank | Nat. | Player | Period | Apps |
|---|---|---|---|---|
| 1 | (Germany) | Hermann Ohlicher | 1973–1985 | 460 |
| 2 | (Germany) | Helmut Roleder | 1972–1986 | 411 |
| 3 | (Germany) | Karl Allgöwer | 1980–1991 | 410 |
| 4 | (Germany) | Günther Schäfer | 1980–1996 | 399 |
| 4 | (Croatia) | Zvonimir Soldo | 1996–2006 | 399 |
| 6 | (Germany) | Guido Buchwald | 1983–1994 | 387 |
| 7 | (Germany) | Christian Gentner | 2004–2007; 2010–2019 | 373 |
| 8 | (Germany) | Karlheinz Förster | 1977–1986 | 365 |
| 9 | (Germany) | Cacau | 2003–2014 | 346 |
| 10 | (Germany) | Eike Immel | 1986–1995 | 340 |

Top scorers
| Rank | Nat. | Player | Period | Goals |
|---|---|---|---|---|
| 1 | (Germany) | Karl Allgöwer | 1980–1991 | 166 |
| 2 | (Germany) | Hermann Ohlicher | 1973–1985 | 157 |
| 3 | (Germany) | Fritz Walter | 1987–1994 | 123 |
| 4 | (Germany) | Cacau | 2003–2014 | 109 |
| 4 | (Germany) | Mario Gómez | 2003–2009; 2018–2020 | 109 |
| 6 | (Germany) | Jürgen Klinsmann | 1984–1989 | 94 |
| 7 | (Germany) | Fredi Bobic | 1994–1999 | 86 |
| 8 | (Germany) | Hansi Müller | 1975–1982 | 81 |
| 9 | (Bulgaria) | Krasimir Balakov | 1995–2003 | 73 |
| 10 | (Germany) | Karl-Heinz Handschuh | 1966–1974 | 72 |

== Coaches ==
=== Current coaching staff ===
| Name | Position |
|---|---|
| (Germany) Sebastian Hoeneß | Head coach |
| (Germany) David Krecidlo | Assistant coach |
| (Germany) Malik Fathi | Assistant coach |
| (Germany) Steffen Krebs | Goalkeeping coach |
| (Germany) Matthias Schiffers | Fitness coach |
| (Germany) Dr. André Filipović | Fitness coach |
| (Germany) Jan Schimpchen | Fitness coach |
| (Germany) Martin Franz | Preventative coach |
| (Germany) Florian Mohr | Performance manager |
| (United States) Nathaniel Weiss | Technical coach |
| (Germany) Philip Kipp | Individual coach |
| (Germany) Marcus Fregin | Chief analyst |
| (Germany) Jasper Smets | Match analyst |
| (Germany) Günther Schäfer | Team manager |
| (Germany) Peter Reichert | Team official |
| (Germany) Prof. Dr. Raymond Best | Club doctor |
| (Germany) Prof. Dr. Dr. Heiko Striegel | Club doctor |
| (Germany) Dr. Mario Bucher | Club doctor |
| (Germany) Matthias Hahn | Physiotherapist |
| (Germany) Manuel Roth | Physiotherapist |
| (Germany) Michael Schuhmacher | Physiotherapist |
| (Germany) Gregor Ludwig | Physiotherapist |
| (Germany) Michael Meusch | Kit manager |
| (Serbia) Gordana Marković-Mašala | Kit manager |
| (Germany) Thomas Schultheiss | Kit manager |
| (Germany) Nina Fischer | Nutritionist |

=== Management since 1920 ===
Managers of the club since 1920:

| Manager | Period | Honours |
| (Germany) Grünwald | 1920 | |
| (England) Edward Hanney (1889–1964) | 1 July 1924 – 27 Jan | Bezirksliga Württemberg-Baden champions 1927 |
| (Hungary) Lajos Kovács (1894–1961) | September 1927 – 31 December 1929 | Württemberg division champions 1930 |
| (Germany) Emil Friz (1904–1966) | 1 January 1930 – 15 June 1930 | |
| (Germany) Karl Preuß | 15 June 1930–33 | |
| (Germany) Willi Rutz (1907–1993) | July 1933–34 | |
| (Germany) Emil Gröner (1892–1944) | 1934–35 | |
| (Germany) Fritz Teufel (1910–1950) | 1935 – 30 June 1936 | German championship runners-up 1935, Gauliga Württemberg champions 1935 |
| (Germany) Leonhard "Lony" Seiderer (1895–1940) | 1 July 1936 – 30 June 1939 | Gauliga Württemberg champions 1937, 1938 |
| (Germany) Karl Becker (1902–1942) | March 1939 – April 39 | |
| (Germany) Josef Pöttinger (1903–1970) | 1 May 1939 – Oct 39 | |
| (Germany) Fritz Teufel (1910–1950) | 1 July 1945 – 30 June 1947 | Oberliga Süd champions 1946 |
| (Germany) Georg Wurzer (1907–1982) | 1 July 1947 – 30 April 1960 | German champions 1950, 1952, Runners-up 1953, Oberliga Süd champions 1952, 1954, German Cup 1954, 1958 |
| (Germany) Kurt Baluses (1914–1972) | 1 May 1960 – 24 February 1965 | |
| (Germany) Franz Seybold (1912–1978) | 25 February 1965 – 7 March 1965 | |
| (Germany) Rudi Gutendorf (1926–2019) | 8 March 1965 – 6 December 1966 | |
| (Germany) Albert Sing (1917–2008) | 7 December 1966 – 30 June 1967 | |
| (Germany) Gunther Baumann (1921–1998) | 1 July 1967 – 30 June 1969 | |
| (Germany) Franz Seybold (1912–1978) | 1 July 1969 – 30 June 1970 | |
| (Socialist Federal Republic of Yugoslavia) Branko Zebec (1929–1988) | 1 July 1970 – 18 April 1972 | |
| (Germany) Karl Bögelein (1927–2016) | 19 April 1972 – 30 June 1972 | |
| (Germany) Hermann Eppenhoff (1919–1992) | 1 July 1972 – 1 December 1974 | |
| (Germany) Fritz Millinger (b. 1935) | 2 December 1974 – 13 December 1974 | |
| (Germany) Albert Sing (1917–2008) | 14 December 1974 – 30 June 1975 | |
| (Hungary) István Sztani (b. 1937) | 1 July 1975 – 31 March 1976 | |
| (Germany) Karl Bögelein (1927–2016) | 1 April 1976 – 30 June 1976 | |
| (Germany) Jürgen Sundermann (1940–2022) | 1 July 1976 – 30 June 1979 | Bundesliga runners-up 1979 |
| (Germany) Lothar Buchmann (b. 1936) | 1 July 1979 – 30 June 1980 | |
| (Germany) Jürgen Sundermann (1940–2022) | 1 July 1980 – 30 June 1982 | |
| (Germany) Helmut Benthaus (b. 1935) | 1 July 1982 – 30 June 1985 | German champions 1984 |
| (Croatia) Otto Barić (b. 1932) | 1 July 1985 – 4 March 1986 | |
| (Germany) Willi Entenmann (1943–2012) | 5 March 1986 – 30 June 1986 | German Cup runners-up 1986 |
| (Germany) Egon Coordes (b. 1944) | 1 July 1986 – 30 June 1987 | |
| (Netherlands) Arie Haan (b. 1948) | 1 July 1987 – 26 March 1990 | UEFA Cup runners-up 1989 |
| (Germany) Willi Entenmann (1943–2012) | 27 March 1990 – 19 November 1990 | |
| (Germany) Christoph Daum (b. 1953) | 20 November 1990 – 10 December 1993 | German champions 1992 |
| (Germany) Jürgen Röber (b. 1953) | 15 December 1993 – 25 April 1995 | |
| (Germany) Jürgen Sundermann (b. 1940) | 26 April 1995 – 30 June 1995 | |
| (Austria) Rolf Fringer (b. 1957) | 1 July 1995 – 13 August 1996 | |
| (Germany) Joachim Löw (b. 1960) | 14 August 1996 – 30 June 1998 | German Cup 1997, UEFA Cup Winners' Cup runners-up 1998 |
| (Germany) Winfried Schäfer (b. 1950) | 1 July 1998 – 4 December 1998 | |
| (Germany) Wolfgang Rolff (b. 1959) | 5 December 1998 – 31 December 1998 | |
| (Germany) Rainer Adrion (b. 1953) | 1 January 1999 – 2 May 1999 | |
| (Germany) Ralf Rangnick (b. 1958) | 3 May 1999 – 23 February 2001 | |
| (Germany) Felix Magath (b. 1953) | 24 February 2001 – 30 June 2004 | Bundesliga runners-up 2003 |
| (Germany) Matthias Sammer (b. 1967) | 1 July 2004 – 3 June 2005 | |
| (Italy) Giovanni Trapattoni (b. 1939) | 17 June 2005 – 9 February 2006 | |
| (Germany) Armin Veh (b. 1961) | 10 February 2006 – 23 November 2008 | German champions 2007, German Cup runners-up 2007 |
| (Germany) Markus Babbel (b. 1972) | 23 November 2008 – 6 December 2009 | |
| (Switzerland) Christian Gross (b. 1954) | 6 December 2009 – 13 October 2010 | |
| (Germany) Jens Keller (b. 1970) | 13 October 2010 – 12 December 2010 | |
| (Germany) Bruno Labbadia (b. 1966) | 12 December 2010 – 26 August 2013 | German Cup runners-up 2013 |
| (Germany) Thomas Schneider (b. 1972) | 26 August 2013 – 9 March 2014 | |
| (Netherlands) Huub Stevens (b. 1953) | 10 March 2014 – 30 June 2014 | |
| (Germany) Armin Veh (b. 1961) | 1 July 2014 – 23 November 2014 | |
| (Netherlands) Huub Stevens (b. 1953) | 25 November 2014 – 28 June 2015 | |
| (Germany) Alexander Zorniger (b. 1967) | 29 June 2015 – 24 November 2015 | |
| (Germany) Jürgen Kramny (b. 1971) | 24 November 2015 – 15 May 2016 | |
| (Netherlands) Jos Luhukay (b. 1967) | 15 May 2016 – 15 September 2016 | |
| (Germany) Olaf Janßen (b. 1966) | 15 September 2016 – 20 September 2016 | |
| (Germany) Hannes Wolf (b. 1981) | 20 September 2016 – 28 January 2018 | |
| (Turkey) Tayfun Korkut (b. 1974) | 29 January 2018 – 7 October 2018 | |
| (Germany) Markus Weinzierl (b. 1974) | 9 October 2018 – 20 April 2019 | |
| (Germany) Nico Willig (b. 1980) | 20 April 2019 – 18 June 2019 | |
| (Germany) Tim Walter (b. 1975) | 19 June 2019 – 23 December 2019 | |
| (United States) Pellegrino Matarazzo (b. 1977) | 30 December 2019 – 10 October 2022 | |
| (Germany) Michael Wimmer (b. 1980) | 11 October 2022 – 5 December 2022 | |
| (Germany) Bruno Labbadia (b. 1966) | 5 December 2022 – 3 April 2023 | |
| (Germany) Sebastian Hoeneß (b. 1982) | 3 April 2023 – | Bundesliga runners-up 2024, German Cup 2025 |

== Bundesliga positions ==
The season-by-season performance of the club since 1963 (Bundesliga era):

| Season | Division | Tier | Position |
| 1963–64 | Bundesliga | I | 5th |
| 1964–65 | Bundesliga | I | 12th |
| 1965–66 | Bundesliga | I | 11th |
| 1966–67 | Bundesliga | I | 12th |
| 1967–68 | Bundesliga | I | 8th |
| 1968–69 | Bundesliga | I | 5th |
| 1969–70 | Bundesliga | I | 7th |
| 1970–71 | Bundesliga | I | 12th |
| 1971–72 | Bundesliga | I | 8th |
| 1972–73 | Bundesliga | I | 6th |
| 1973–74 | Bundesliga | I | 9th |
| 1974–75 | Bundesliga | I | 16th ↓ |
| 1975–76 | 2. Bundesliga | II | 11th |
| 1976–77 | 2. Bundesliga | II | 1st ↑ |
| 1977–78 | Bundesliga | I | 4th |
| 1978–79 | Bundesliga | I | 2nd |
| 1979–80 | Bundesliga | I | 3rd |
| 1980–81 | Bundesliga | I | 3rd |
| 1981–82 | Bundesliga | I | 9th |
| 1982–83 | Bundesliga | I | 3rd |
| 1983–84 | Bundesliga | I | 1st |
| 1984–85 | Bundesliga | I | 10th |
| 1985–86 | Bundesliga | I | 5th |
| 1986–87 | Bundesliga | I | 12th |
| 1987–88 | Bundesliga | I | 4th |
| 1988–89 | Bundesliga | I | 5th |
| 1989–90 | Bundesliga | I | 6th |
| 1990–91 | Bundesliga | I | 6th |
| 1991–92 | Bundesliga | I | 1st |
| 1992–93 | Bundesliga | I | 7th |
| 1993–94 | Bundesliga | I | 7th |

| Season | Division | Tier | Position |
| 1994–95 | Bundesliga | I | 12th |
| 1995–96 | Bundesliga | I | 10th |
| 1996–97 | Bundesliga | I | 4th |
| 1997–98 | Bundesliga | I | 4th |
| 1998–99 | Bundesliga | I | 11th |
| 1999–2000 | Bundesliga | I | 8th |
| 2000–01 | Bundesliga | I | 15th |
| 2001–02 | Bundesliga | I | 8th |
| 2002–03 | Bundesliga | I | 2nd |
| 2003–04 | Bundesliga | I | 4th |
| 2004–05 | Bundesliga | I | 5th |
| 2005–06 | Bundesliga | I | 9th |
| 2006–07 | Bundesliga | I | 1st |
| 2007–08 | Bundesliga | I | 6th |
| 2008–09 | Bundesliga | I | 3rd |
| 2009–10 | Bundesliga | I | 6th |
| 2010–11 | Bundesliga | I | 12th |
| 2011–12 | Bundesliga | I | 6th |
| 2012–13 | Bundesliga | I | 12th |
| 2013–14 | Bundesliga | I | 15th |
| 2014–15 | Bundesliga | I | 14th |
| 2015–16 | Bundesliga | I | 17th ↓ |
| 2016–17 | 2. Bundesliga | II | 1st ↑ |
| 2017–18 | Bundesliga | I | 7th |
| 2018–19 | Bundesliga | I | 16th ↓ |
| 2019–20 | 2. Bundesliga | II | 2nd ↑ |
| 2020–21 | Bundesliga | I | 9th |
| 2021–22 | Bundesliga | I | 15th |
| 2022–23 | Bundesliga | I | 16th |
| 2023–24 | Bundesliga | I | 2nd |
| 2024–25 | Bundesliga | I | 9th |
| 2025–26 | Bundesliga | I | 4th |
| 2026–27 | Bundesliga | I | |

Key

| 1st Champions | ↑ Promoted | ↓ Relegated |
