= Jos Luhukay =

Dutch football manager (born 1963)

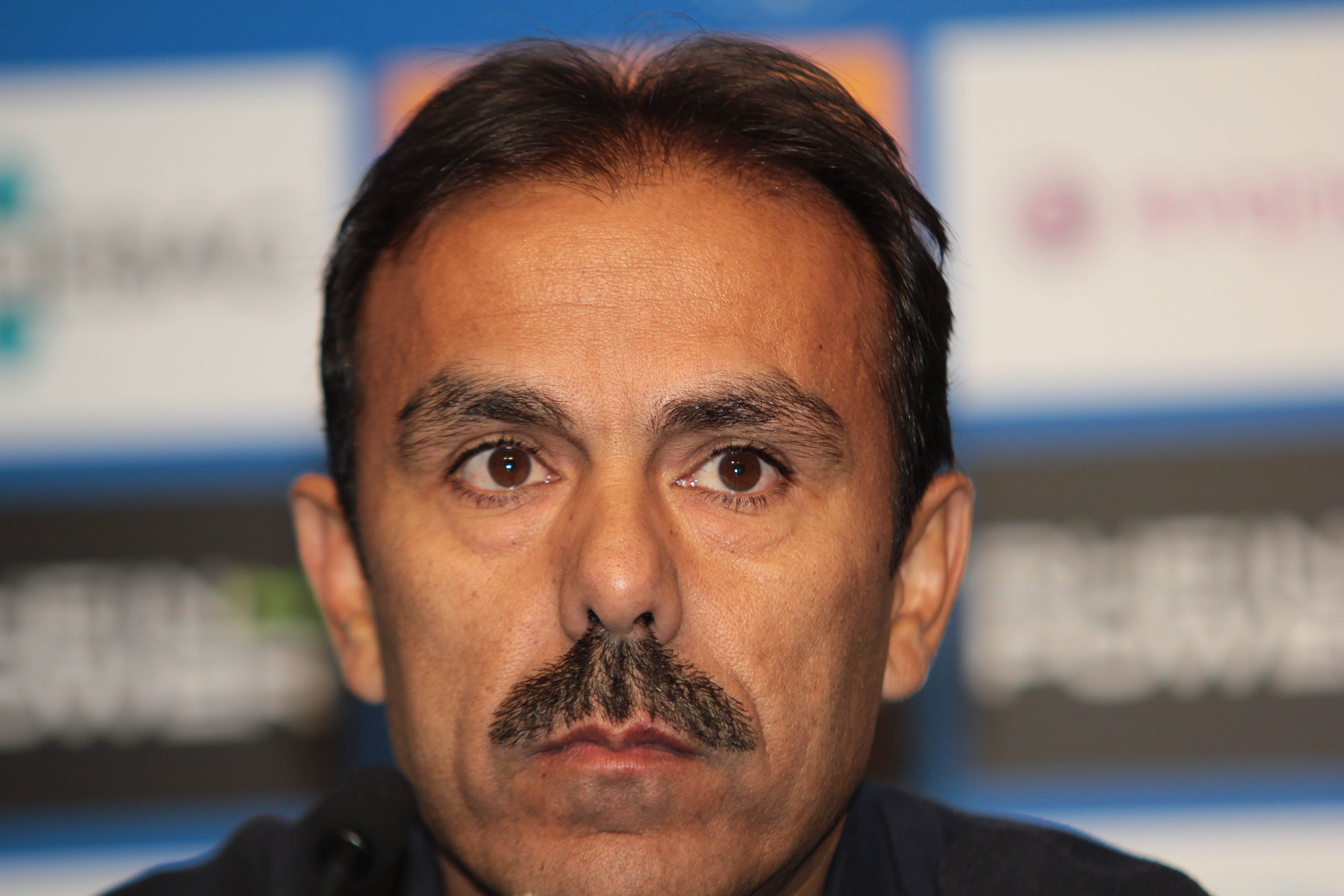
- Luhukay in 2012

Personal information
- Date of birth: 13 June 1963 (age 63)
- Place of birth: Venlo, Netherlands
- Height: 1.70 m (5 ft 7 in)
- Position: Midfielder

Senior career*
Years	Team	Apps	(Gls)
1979–1982	VVV-Venlo	20	(4)
1986–1989	VVV-Venlo	75	(19)
1989–1991	SVV	57	(12)
1991–1993	RKC Waalwijk	35	(6)
1993–1995	SV Straelen		
1995–1996	KFC Uerdingen	2	(0)
1996–1998	SV Straelen		

Managerial career
- 1998–2000: SV Straelen
- 2000–2002: KFC Uerdingen
- 2003: 1. FC Köln (caretaker)
- 2005–2006: SC Paderborn
- 2007–2008: Borussia Mönchengladbach
- 2009–2012: FC Augsburg
- 2012–2015: Hertha BSC
- 2016: VfB Stuttgart
- 2018: Sheffield Wednesday
- 2019–2020: FC St. Pauli
- 2021–2022: VVV-Venlo
- * Club domestic league appearances and goals

Jos Luhukay (born 13 June 1963) is a Dutch football manager and former player, who was most recently head coach of VVV-Venlo.

== Playing career ==
He began his career at the age of 15 at his hometown club FC VVV and he made his league debut in January 1981 against FC Den Bosch. In 1989, he went to play at SVV Schiedam, where he stayed until 1991. After playing for RKC Waalwijk from 1991 until 1993, he left his homeland for Germany, where he had two stints at SV Straelen (1993 to 1995 and 1996 to 1998), in-between playing for KFC Uerdingen from 1995 to 1996. At KFC Uerdingen, Luhukay played two games in the Bundesliga. In 1998, he quit his active career at SV Straelen. Jos Luhukay always played as midfielder.

== Managerial career ==
=== Early coaching career ===
Just one month after the end of his career as a player, he became the manager at SV Straelen. Two years later he went to KFC Uerdingen again and in 2002 he was hired as an assistant coach at Bundesliga side 1. FC Köln. In 2005, he became manager at 2. Bundesliga team SC Paderborn 07, finishing the 2005–06 season in 9th place. He resigned there on 11 August 2006.

=== Borussia Mönchengladbach ===
On 2 January 2007, he was hired by Bundesliga side Borussia Mönchengladbach as assistant manager to Jupp Heynckes. Heynckes resigned shortly after on 31 January 2007 following a run of 13 games without a win, leaving Luhukay to take over. Luhukay was unable to save Gladbach from relegation, and they finished the 2007–08 season in 18th position in the Bundesliga. In his first full season in charge, Luhukay guided Gladbach to an immediate return to the top flight, finishing the season as 2. Bundesliga as champions with 66 points. On 5 October 2008, Luhukay was sacked by Borussia Mönchengladbach, with the team 18th in the table.

=== FC Augsburg ===
On 23 March 2009, Luhukay signed with FC Augsburg as manager, with a view to taking over on 1 July that summer. Following the sacking of Holger Fach on 15 April 2009, Luhukay stepped into the managerial role earlier than planned. In his first full season in charge, Luhukay guided Augsburg to 3rd position in the 2. Bundesliga where they met Nürnberg in the play-offs, losing 3–0 on aggregate and missing out on promotion. During this season, Augsburg also reached the semi-final of the DFB-Pokal, where they lost 2–0 to Werder Bremen. The following season, Augsburg won promotion to the Bundesliga for the first time in their history, finishing 2nd in the league. In their first season in the top flight, Augsburg finished 14th, avoiding relegation by 7 points. Luhukay resigned immediately after the final league match of the 2011–12 season after just over three years in charge.

=== Hertha BSC ===
On 17 May 2012, Luhukay became the new manager of Hertha BSC. He officially took over coaching duties on 1 July 2012. In his first game in charge on 3 August 2012, Hertha drew 2–2 with Luhukay's former club Paderborn 07. In the 2012–13 season, Hertha broke the record for the most points in a 2. Bundesliga season, winning promotion back to the top flight as league champions with 76 points. They also reached the quarter final of the DFB-Pokal. In Luhukay's second season with Hertha, they finished 11th in the Bundesliga. On 5 February 2015, Hertha sacked Luhukay, naming Pál Dárdai as replacement along with assistant Rainer Widmayer. Hertha had lost 1–0 the previous day and were 17th in the table at the time. They eventually finished 15th, avoiding the relegation play-off on goal difference.

=== VfB Stuttgart ===
On 17 May 2016, he was appointed as the new head coach of VfB Stuttgart. After conflicts with sporting director Jan Schindelmeiser, Luhukay resigned as the coach of VfB Stuttgart with immediate effect on 15 September 2016. Schindelmeiser stated that Luhukay opposed the signings of Carlos Mané, Takuma Asano and Benjamin Pavard. He had a record of three wins, no draws, and two losses.

=== Sheffield Wednesday ===
On 5 January 2018, Luhukay was announced as the new manager of Sheffield Wednesday, replacing Carlos Carvalhal. Becoming the Owls' 33rd manager, Luhukay also became the first Dutch, and only the second non-British manager of the club. Luhukay's first match in charge of the club was an away match against local rivals Sheffield United, which ended in a goalless draw and saw the Owls go down to ten men following the dismissal of club captain Glenn Loovens.

His first victory as manager came on 16 January 2018, when Sheffield Wednesday defeated Carlisle United 2–0 in an FA Cup third round replay. Luhukay's first victory in the league came on 13 February 2018, when Sheffield Wednesday defeated Derby County 2–0 at Hillsborough.

On 21 December 2018, Luhukay was sacked by Sheffield Wednesday after a run of only 1 win and 7 defeats in 10 games with the team sitting 18th in the table.

=== FC St. Pauli ===
On 10 April 2019, Luhukay was announced as the new manager of FC St. Pauli, replacing Markus Kauczinski. He left the club on 29 June 2020.

=== VVV-Venlo ===
Lukuhay replaced Hans de Koning as manager of VVV in March 2021, only his first manager job in his home country. He left the club by mutual consent on 30 May 2022 after a disappointing season as the club finished 10th in the second tier.

== Managerial statistics ==
As of matches played on 6 May 2022

Team	From	To	Record					
Team	From	To	G	W	D	L	Win %	Ref.
Uerdingen	1 July 2000	30 June 2002	73	29	19	25	39.73	
Köln	30 October 2003	2 November 2003	1	0	0	1	0.00	
Paderborn	1 July 2005	11 August 2006	35	13	7	15	37.14	
Borussia Mönchengladbach	31 January 2007	5 October 2008	60	23	16	21	38.33	
Augsburg	15 April 2009	5 May 2012	123	53	37	33	43.09	
Hertha BSC	1 July 2012	5 February 2015	92	40	22	30	43.48	
Stuttgart	17 May 2016	15 September 2016	5	3	0	2	60.00	
Sheffield Wednesday	8 January 2018	21 December 2018	48	16	13	19	33.33	
FC St. Pauli	10 April 2019	30 June 2020	49	14	17	18	28.57	
VVV-Venlo	17 March 2021	30 May 2022	47	14	8	25	29.79	
Total			523	199	137	187	38.05	—

== Honours ==
=== Manager ===
Borussia Mönchengladbach

- 2. Bundesliga Champions: 2007–08

FC Augsburg

- 2. Bundesliga Runners-up: 2010–11

Hertha BSC

- 2. Bundesliga Champions: 2012–13

University of Utrecht

- Extended Project Qualification – The Success of Dutch Managers in the English Second Tier Football: 1998–99
