= Georg Pfäfflin =

German Protestant pastor and author

Georg Pfäfflin (Georg Pfaefflin) (November 3, 1908 in Bösenlustnau in Germany – April 3, 1972 near Göttingen) was a German Protestant dean and pastor of the Evangelical-Lutheran Church in Württemberg in Germany.

== Biography ==
Georg was the second of the seven children of the Lutheran clergyman Friedrich Pfäfflin and his wife Anna, née Breidenbach. Friedrich Pfäfflin was parish priest at the Luther Church in Cannstatt and became known as the author of a German-language translation of the Bible (1939). Georg Pfäfflin's marriage to his wife Ursula, née Bossert (born March 27, 1913 in Stuttgart; † April 3, 1972 near Göttingen) took place in Stuttgart in 1936. She was heavily involved in community work and in the Müttergenesungswerk during her marriage. Ursula Pfäfflin was the district representative of the Evangelical Women's Aid. In 1966 she was elected to the Evangelical State Synod for the Open Church group with the most votes in the Württemberg regional church.

After studying theology in Tübingen and Erlangen, Georg Pfäfflin was vicar in Sulzbach an der Murr and youth vicar in Stuttgart, assistant at the practical theological seminar in Tübingen and vicar and youth pastor in Ulm.

From 1936 to 1942 he was a foreign pastor in the German-speaking community of Lima. On the return journey the couple was interned in Texas, but they finally returned home in August 1942.

After his return, Pfäfflin became pastor in Waldenbuch from 1942 to 1945; he was introduced to the pastorate on July 11, 1943. Here Pfäfflin made the Protestant church available to Catholic Christians for church services. During the war Pfäfflin and his wife took part in rescuing persecuted Jews, and they gave shelter to the Jew Elfriede Friedemann, alias Ella Braun. After the end of the war, he was appointed pastor at the Magdalenenkirchengemeinde in Stuttgart (1946–1952).

In 1950 he was invited to travel to the USA for 90 days as an exchange priest as part of a reconciliation program run by the American government. Afterwards he visited his former parish in Peru.

He was dean in Aalen (1952–1967). Here he carried out the parish service with great commitment, built community centers and renovated churches. When he said goodbye to Aalen, the newspaper Schwäbische Post paid tribute to him: A distinguished personality in intellectual life is leaving Aalen. In the last phase of his professional activity, Pfäfflin worked as dean in Bad Cannstatt from July 2, 1967 – 1972. Here in the city of Stuttgart, his grandfather and father had already worked as pastors.

When the family was on a trip to Hamburg on Easter Monday 1972, Georg Pfäfflin, his wife and two of their eleven children were killed in a traffic accident on the motorway. The funeral took place on April 7, 1972 at the Steinhaldenfriedhof (main cemetery) in Stuttgart. The funeral service was held in the town church in Bad Cannstatt, in which regional bishop Helmut Class gave the eulogy.

== Honors ==
- The town of Waldenbuch commemorates the work of Georg Pfäfflin with the column (Stele) number 10 on Marktstrasse.
- The Evangelical Church Community of Waldenbuch has named its community center the Georg-Pfäfflin Community Center.
- The Evangelische Steigkirchengemeinde, Auf der Steig 25, 70376 Stuttgart, commemorates Ursula Pfäfflin's great commitment to community work with the Ursula Pfäfflin Kindergarten.
- Pfäfflinstrasse (Pfäfflin Street) in 70378 Stuttgart is reminiscent of the work of the Pfäfflin family.

== Literature ==
- Georg Friedrich Pfäfflin: Mein Vater Georg Pfäfflin (My father Georg Pfäfflin), November 3, 1908 – April 3, 1972. A picture of life for the 100th birthday, Tübingen 2008.
- Official Gazette of the City of Stuttgart (April 13, 1972): Article on the funeral service of Dean Pfäfflin, Stuttgart.
- Stuttgarter Zeitung: On the death of Dean Pfäfflin, April 5, 1972
- HNA Hessische/Niedersächsische Allgemeine, April 4, 1972 Lower Saxony page: Four dead and six seriously injured on Easter Monday
