= Karl Bögelein =

German footballer and coach

Personal information
- Full name: Karl Bögelein
- Date of birth: 28 January 1927
- Place of birth: Bamberg, Bavaria, Germany
- Date of death: 9 August 2016 (aged 89)
- Position: Goalkeeper

Senior career*
Years	Team	Apps	(Gls)
–1951	1. FC Bamberg		
1951–1957	VfB Stuttgart	166	(0)
1957–1963	SSV Reutlingen 05	154	(0)

International career
1951	West Germany	1	(0)

Managerial career
- 1972: VfB Stuttgart
- 1976: VfB Stuttgart
- * Club domestic league appearances and goals

Karl Bögelein (28 January 1927 – 9 August 2016) was a German football goalkeeper and coach.

== Honours ==
With VfB Stuttgart:

- German Champion (1952)
- DFB-Pokal (1954)
