= Cannstatter Volksfest =

Folk festival in Stuttgart, Germany

Coordinates: 48.7960°N 9.2190°E

The Cannstatter Volksfest is an annual three-week Volksfest (beer festival and travelling funfair) in Stuttgart, Germany. It is sometimes also referred to by foreign visitors as the Stuttgart Beer Festival, although it is actually more of an autumnal fair.

The festival takes place at the Cannstatter Wasen from late September to early October, spanning a period over three weekends, ending the second Sunday in October. The extensive Wasen area is in the Stuttgart city district of Bad Cannstatt, near the river Neckar. A smaller variant of the Stuttgart festival, the Stuttgart Spring Festival, is also held each year in Wasen.

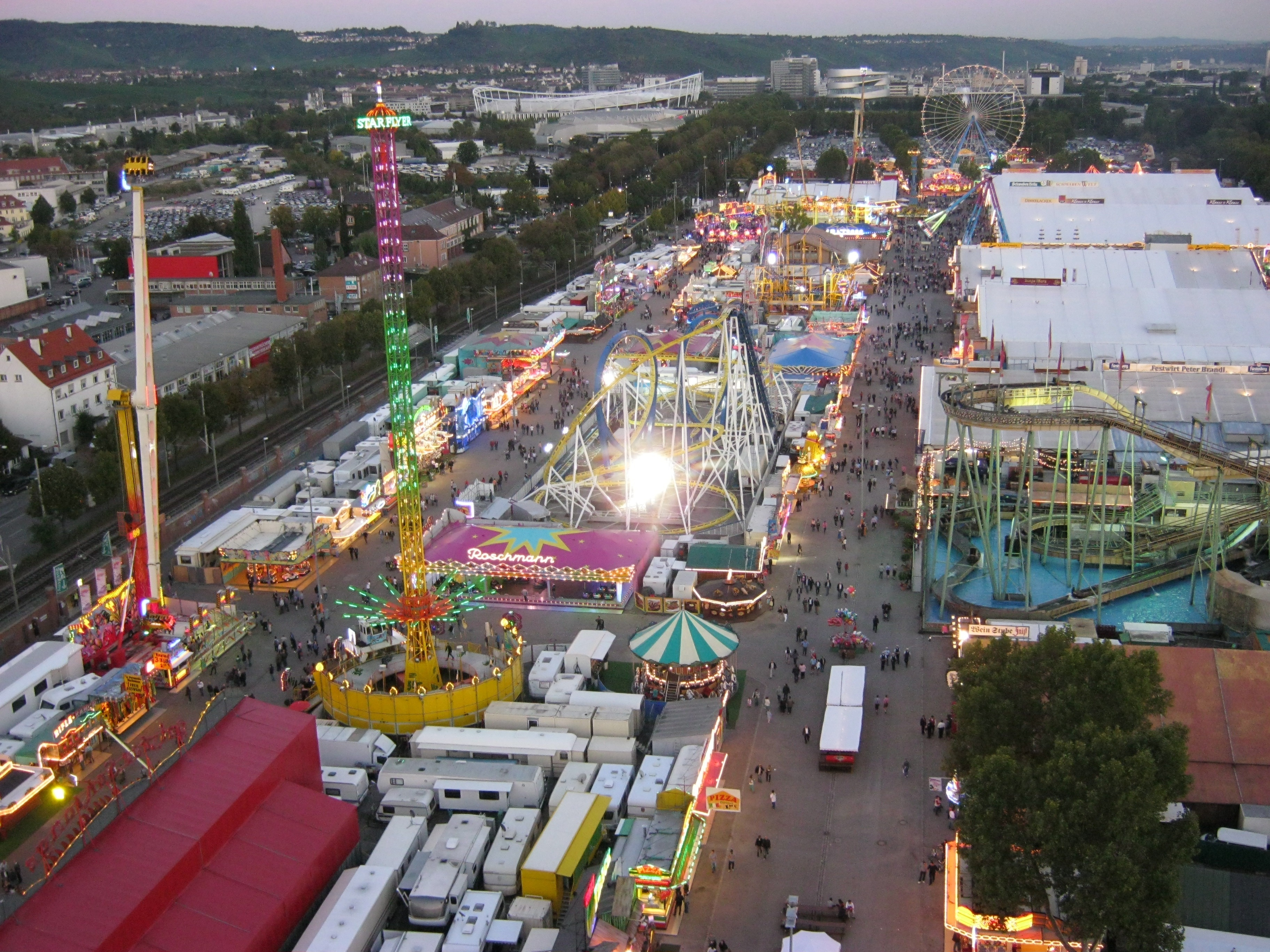
Cannstatter Volksfest 2012

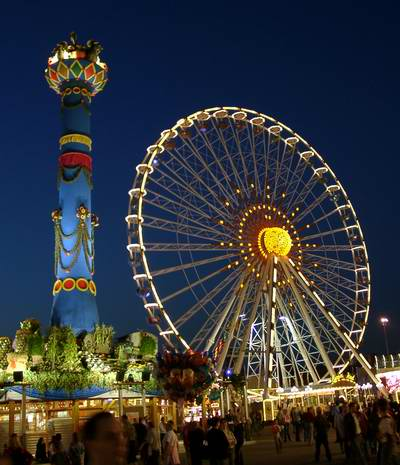
Cannstatter Volksfest 2004

Although the Volksfest is not strictly speaking a beer festival, it is considered by many to be the second largest beer celebration in the world after the Munich Oktoberfest. According to estimates about 4.2 million people visited the festival in 2006. The Volksfest begins one week later than the Oktoberfest.

== History ==
The first Cannstatter Volksfest was conceived as a celebration of agriculture after a period of crop failures and famine as a result of the volcanic winter following the 1815 eruption of Mount Tambora in Indonesia. The inaugural event was held in a meadow near the River Neckar on 28 September 1818, and featured displays of agricultural technology and a "Fruchtsäule" (Fruit Column) display covered with fruits, vegetables, and grains donated by King Wilhelm I.

In the following decades, the Volksfest grew and evolved beyond its agricultural focus. In 1841, the festival's first parade was held, which featured over 10,000 participants and 100,000 spectators.

The festival grounds underwent improvements in 1905 following the merger of Cannstatt with Stuttgart. The festival was suspended from 1914 to 1918 due to World War I. Radio broadcasting from the festival began in 1924; however, the festival was again cancelled and replaced with an agricultural exhibition in 1925.

In Nazi Germany, only five Cannstatter Volksfests took place between 1933 and 1939. The 1933 event was canceled in favor of the German Gymnastics Festival. For the 100th Volksfest in 1935, the fruit column returned alongside a single Agricultural Festival (LWH). The 103rd festival in 1938 was the final festival under Nazi control before Germany's invasion of Poland in September 1939. Following World War II, the first postwar festival was held in 1949 as a modest "Autumn Festival."

== Parade ==
Traditionally a parade also takes place at the Wasen, usually on the first Sunday. In 1954 a record number of spectators attended the parade along the route from Stuttgart's central square to the Wasen site: 300,000. The Mohrenköpfle is a pig in the parade. On the orders of King Wilhelm I, Maskenschweine (Meishan pigs) were imported from Central China in 1820–21, in order to improve pig breeding in the kingdom of Baden-Württemberg. This crossbreeding with the "Chinese pigs" was particularly successful within the stocks of domestic pigs in the Hohenlohe region and the area around the town of Schwäbisch Hall.
