= Fruit Column =

Coordinates: 48°47′43.89″N 9°13′11.90″E

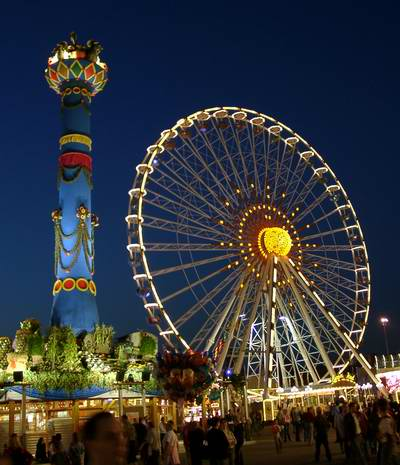
Fruit Column at Cannstatter Volksfest

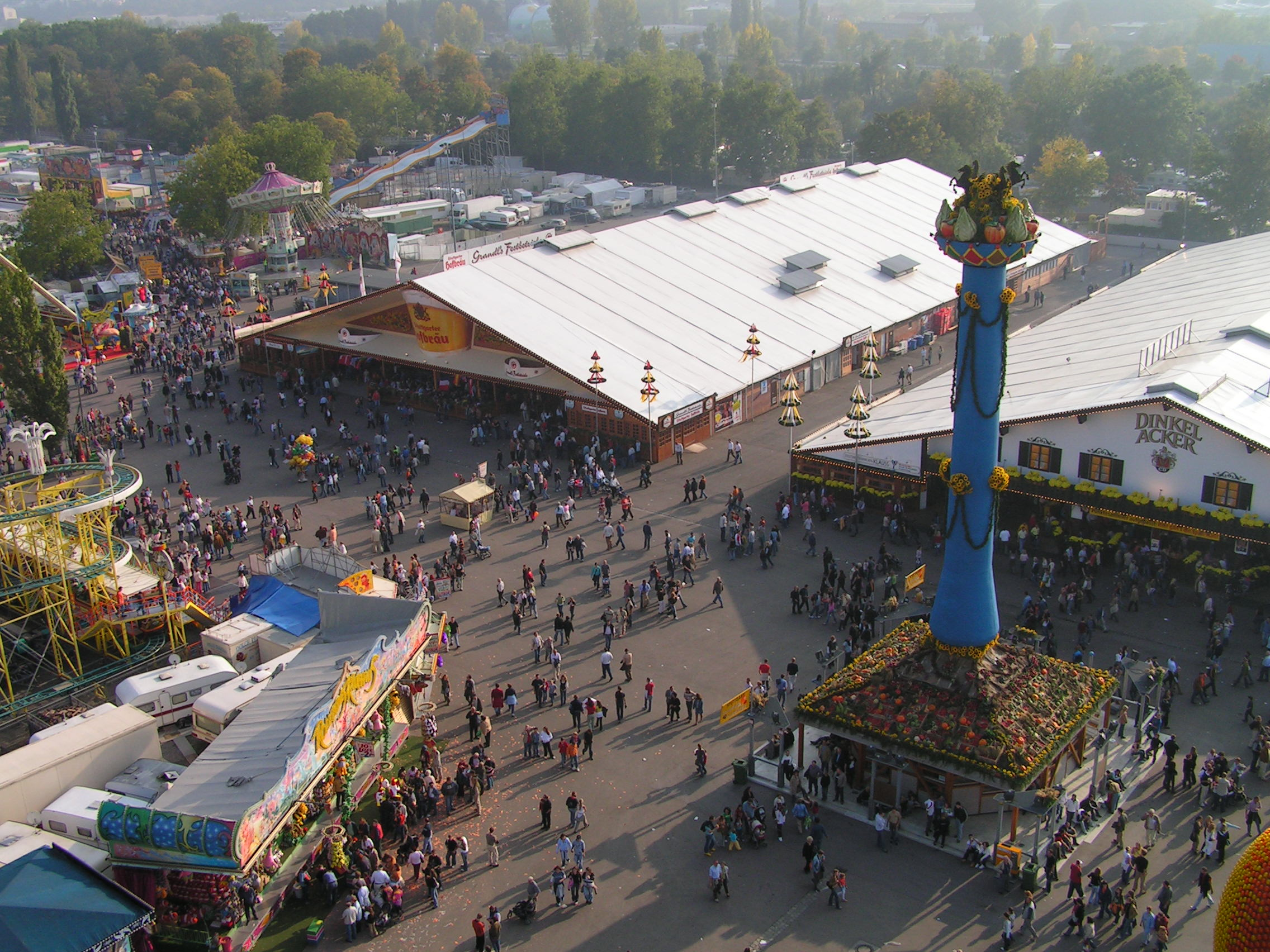
The Fruit Column from above

The fruit column (German: Fruchtsäule) is a 26-metre-high (85 ft) wood column decorated with fruits in Stuttgart, Germany. It was designed in 1818 by the German architect Nikolaus Friedrich von Thouret.

It weighs 3.5 tons and is remains the landmark of the Cannstatter Wasen in Stuttgart although it is towered by numerous roundabouts. Already at the first celebration in 1818 there was a fruit column as landmark, which had been sketched and built by the master of building of yards of Wuerttemberg at that time, Nikolaus Thouret.

After the First World War, with which beginning of the first German republic became, the fruit column was banned as "monarchistic" leftover from the Cannstatter Wasen. Since 1935, it stands for the 100th anniversary again on its traditional place. The fruit column, whose design was changed in the course of the years, was dismantled until recently annually after conclusion of the people celebration. Every few years a new fruit column with other Design was established again and again. Starting in 1995 it was experimentally let long all-season stand by way of trial and was thus also on Stuttgart spring celebrations to be seen for the first time. Since a few years only the column is dismantled and the underbody, in which some statuses of information are and which carries the Cannstatter city can during the spring celebration, left untouched.

== See also ==
- List of towers
