= Bad Cannstatt =

- Borough of Stuttgart
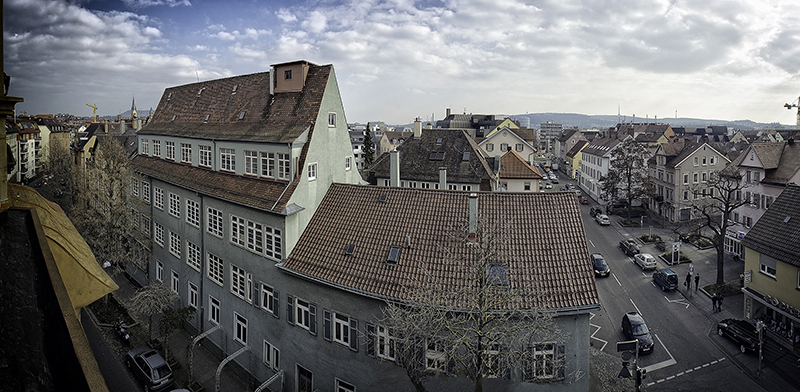

- Coat of arms

- Location in Stuttgart
- Interactive map of Bad Cannstatt
- Location within Germany Location within Baden-Württemberg
- Coordinates: 48°48′20.16″N 9°12′50.76″E
- Country: Germany
- State: Baden-Württemberg
- Admin. region: Stuttgart
- District: Urban district
- City: Stuttgart
- Subdivisions: 19 Boroughs

Area
  - Total: 15.713 km^{2} (6.067 sq mi)
- Elevation: 205 m (673 ft)

Population (2020-12-31)
  - Total: 70,600
  - Density: 4,490/km^{2} (11,600/sq mi)
- Time zone: UTC+01:00 (CET)
  - Summer (DST): UTC+02:00 (CEST)
- Postal codes: 70331–70378
- Dialling codes: 0711
- Vehicle registration: S
- Website: www.stuttgart.de

Bad Cannstatt (German pronunciation: [baːt ˈkanʃtat]), also called Cannstatt (until July 23, 1933) or Kannstadt (until 1900), is one of the outer Stadtbezirke, or city boroughs, of Stuttgart in Baden-Württemberg, Germany. Bad Cannstatt is the oldest and most populous of Stuttgart's boroughs, and one of the most historically significant towns in the area of Stuttgart. (Note: For most of Stuttgart's early history, Bad Cannstatt overshadowed the comparably small town of Stuttgart in importance.) The town is home to the Cannstatter Wasen and Cannstatter Volksfest beer festivals, the MHPArena (VfB Stuttgart), the Hanns-Martin-Schleyer-Halle, and the Porsche-Arena.

== Name ==
Bad Cannstatt's name originates from a Castra stativa, Cannstatt Castrum, the massive Roman castra that was erected on the hilly ridge in AD 90 to protect the valuable river crossing and local trade. In the past, Bad Cannstatt has been known as simply Cannstatt or Kannstatt, Cannstadt, Canstatt, Kanstatt, and Condistat. Its name was changed to include "Bad" (German: Bath) to mention the town's spas on 23 July 1933.

== History ==
Bad Cannstatt lies on the Neckar at the convergence of various regional trails. The area was inhabited by the Seelberg mammoth hunters during the last glacial period. The town was founded during the Roman period, records survive of Roman knowledge of the area's springs. The nearby Sielberg is notable for its caverns and fossils.

In 746 Carloman, Mayor of the Palace of Austrasia, called a council at Cannstatt, arrested and executed virtually all nobles of the Alemanni. This marks the transfer of power from the Alemanni to the emerging Carolingians. The present name first appeared as the seat of a court held by Charlemagne in the 8th century while trying the rebellious dukes of Alemannia and Bavaria.

Cannstatt was the capital of the county of Württemberg into the 14th or 15th century; the Rotenberg was the location of the ruling house's ancestral castle. Cannstatt subsequently formed part of the duchy, electorate, and kingdom of Württemberg. It lay about 2.5 miles (4 km) from Stuttgart proper, although it has since grown to include Bad Cannstatt. In the 13th or 14th century, Louis the Bavarian expanded its rights and privileges to equality with Esslingen. Its 15th-century cathedral was dedicated to St Uffo. In 1755, the Great Lisbon earthquake caused the town hall to subside about 3 feet (1 m). During the wars which followed the French Revolution, the town was the site on 21 July 1796 of a French victory over the Austrian Empire.

In the 19th century, it boasted an attractive town hall, a royal theater, a market house, the Wilhelma and Rosenstein palaces, and extensive industry including wool-spinning, dyeing, steelmaking, and construction of machinery. There were then about 40 mineral springs, which were considered beneficial for "dyspepsia and weakness of the nervous system", as well as "diseases of the throat". Cannstatt was the site of Gottlieb Daimler's invention of the first petroleum-fueled automobile in 1886 and housed an automotive factory before the First World War. Around that time, it also had notable railway and chemical works and a brewery. Cannstatt was incorporated into Stuttgart in 1904.

Of the 19 surviving mineral springs, 11 are recognized as state wells. In the world, it is now second to only Újbuda in Budapest, Hungary, in scale. The Mombach spring is the only one that releases its water without pressure in large quantities; its outflow is used in the adjacent baths and the Wilhelma spa.

== Famous residents ==
Famous people associated with Bad Cannstatt include:

- Gottlieb Daimler, inventor of the first automobile, developed in Cannstatt, and part-founder of Daimler-Benz. (Karl Benz independently invented a successful automobile in the same year, 96 km away in Ladenburg.)
- Emy Gordon (née von Beulwitz), writer, translator and Catholic activist
- Georg Pfäfflin (1908–1972), German Lutheran pastor
