= Jan Schindelmeiser =

German director of football (born 1963)

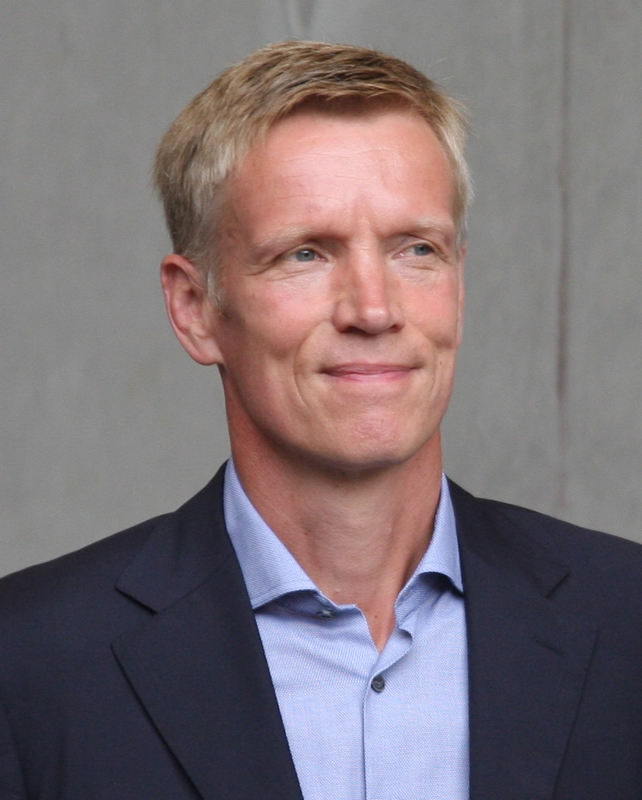
- Born: 17 December 1963 (age 62); Flensburg

Jan Schindelmeiser (born 17 December 1963 in Flensburg) is a German director of football who last worked as the executive board representative for sport of VfB Stuttgart.

== Career ==
From 1981 to 1994 Schindelmeiser played for the second team of KSV Hessen Kassel in the Hessenliga and 1. SC Göttingen 05 in the Oberliga Nord. In 1996, he was signed by Eintracht Braunschweig as director of football. From 1998 to 2000 he took over the same office for Tennis Borussia Berlin. In 2005 Schindelmeiser was sporting director of FC Augsburg. He worked for TSG Hoffenheim from 2006 to 2010 as director of football and CEO.

In July 2016 Schindelmeiser became the sporting director and member of the executive board of VfB Stuttgart. However, after just a year, VfB Stuttgart announced that they have relieved Schindelmeiser of his duties as the club's executive board representative for sport.
