= Cannstatter Wasen =

Festival area in Stuttgart, Germany

Coordinates: 48°47′38″N 9°13′20″E

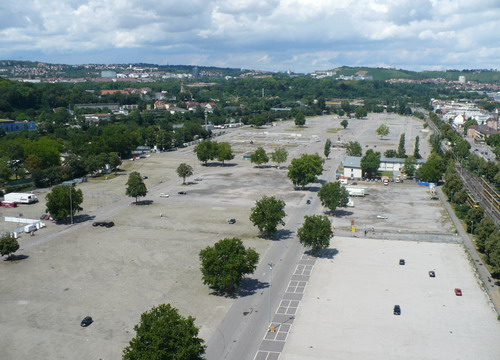

The Cannstatter Wasen is a 35 hectare festival area on the banks of the Neckar river in the part of Stuttgart known as Bad Cannstatt.

The Cannstatter Wasen form part of the Neckar Park Fairground.

Each year the Wasen hosts the Cannstatter Volksfest and the Stuttgart Spring Festival, along with other events such as concerts and circuses.

== History ==
The Cannstatter Wasen, also known as the Cannstatter Volksfest, was first held in 1818 in Stuttgart, Germany. Initiated by King Wilhelm I of Württemberg and his wife Katharina in response to a severe famine and economic hardship, the event was originally conceived as an agricultural festival aimed at revitalising the regional economy and fostering optimism for the future. Due to its initial success, the festival became an annual tradition. Over time, it has evolved significantly, incorporating a wide range of cultural and entertainment elements, while maintaining its original spirit of celebration and community.

== See also ==
- Fruit Column
- Beer festival
