= 1953–54 DFB-Pokal =

Tournament details
- Country: West Germany
- Teams: 8

Final positions
- Champions: VfB Stuttgart
- Runners-up: FC Köln

Tournament statistics
- Matches played: 9

The 1953–54 DFB-Pokal was the 11th season of the annual German football cup competition. 8 teams competed in the tournament of three rounds. It began on 1 August 1953 and ended on 17 April 1954. In the final VfB Stuttgart defeated FC Köln 1–0 after extra time.

== Matches ==
=== Quarter-finals ===
1 August 1953
| 1. FC Kaiserslautern | 2 – 3 | Hamburger SV |
| 1. FC Köln | 3 – 2 | Viktoria 89 Berlin |
| TuS Neuendorf | 2 – 1 | 1. FC Nürnberg |
| VfB Stuttgart | 1 – 1 | SC 09 Bergisch Gladbach | (AET) |

==== Replay ====
1 August 1953
| SC 09 Bergisch Gladbach | 0 – 6 | VfB Stuttgart |

=== Semi-finals ===
13 December 1953
| Hamburger SV | 1 – 3 | 1. FC Köln | (AET) |
| VfB Stuttgart | 2 – 2 | TuS Neuendorf | (AET) |

==== Replay ====
25 March 1954
| TuS Neuendorf | 0 – 2 | VfB Stuttgart |

=== Final ===
17 April 1954

| VfB Stuttgart | 1–0 (a.e.t.) | 1. FC Köln |
|---|---|---|
| Waldner 94' | Report |

Südweststadion, Ludwigshafen
Attendance: 60,000
Referee: Albert Dusch (Kaiserslautern)
