= Marcel Schäfer =

German footballer (born 1984)

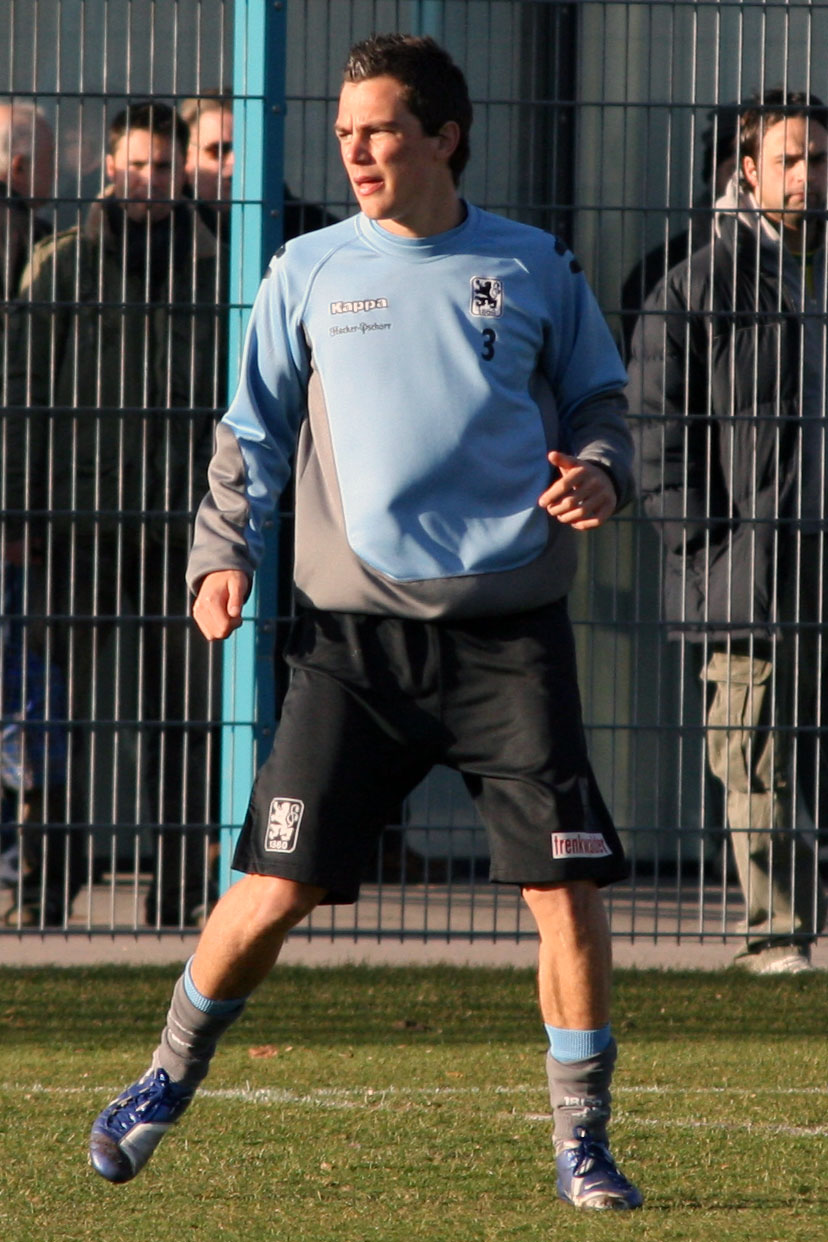
- Schäfer training with 1860 Munich in 2007

Personal information
- Full name: Marcel Schäfer
- Date of birth: 7 June 1984 (age 42)
- Place of birth: Aschaffenburg, West Germany
- Height: 1.84 m (6 ft 0 in)
- Position: Left wing back

Team information
- Current team: RB Leipzig (managing director for sport)

Youth career
- 1989–1996: SV Eintracht Straßbessenbach
- 1996–2000: Viktoria Aschaffenburg
- 2000–2003: 1860 Munich

Senior career*
Years	Team	Apps	(Gls)
2003–2007	1860 Munich	91	(3)
2004	1860 Munich II	7	(3)
2007–2017	VfL Wolfsburg	256	(13)
2014	VfL Wolfsburg II	2	(1)
2017–2018	Tampa Bay Rowdies	43	(5)
Total		399	(25)

International career
2005	Germany B	1	(0)
2008–2010	Germany	8	(0)
- * Club domestic league appearances and goals

Marcel Schäfer (born 7 June 1984) is a German former professional footballer. He is currently the managing director for sport of Bundesliga club RB Leipzig.

== Club career ==
=== 1860 Munich ===
Schäfer made his debut in the Bundesliga on matchday 11, 1 November 2003, as TSV 1860 Munich defeated VfL Bochum 3–1. After descending to the 2. Bundesliga at the end of that season, he established himself in the following years as a regular player. On 4 March 2005, Schäfer scored his first goal for 1860, helping the club to a 3–0 league win over Wacker Burghausen. On the final day of the 2004–05 season, he opened the scoring for 1860 in the 12th minute, but his side fell to a 4–3 defeat to LR Ahlen.

His only goal of the 2005–06 2. Bundesliga season came on the third matchday, heading in 1860's second goal of their 2–2 draw with SpVgg Greuther Fürth on 29 August 2005. In the 2006-07 campaign he appeared in 31 of the 34 scheduled matches.

=== VfL Wolfsburg ===
On 1 July 2007 he returned to the Bundesliga, signing for VfL Wolfsburg in a €1.2 million deal. He made his Bundesliga debut for Wolfsburg in Felix Magath's managerial debut on 11 August 2007, playing the full 90 minutes in the 1–3 defeat to Arminia Bielefeld. His first goal for the club came on 4 November, scoring on a pass from Marcelinho in the 49th minute, but Wolfsburg fell in an entertaining 3–5 defeat to Bochum.

He opened the scoring for Wolfsburg and provided two assists in their match against Borussia Dortmund on 15 December, scoring on the volley after 'keeper Roman Weidenfeller parried an initial shot from Ashkan Dejagah to Schäfer's feet, sending Wolfsburg on their way to a 4–0 victory. In his next appearance for the club, a league match against MSV Duisburg on 9 February 2008, Schäfer scored Wolfsburg's equalizer after an assist from Sascha Riether, helping the Wolves to a 2–1 comeback victory. On matchday 32, he picked up a pass from Christian Gentner and scored from the edge of the penalty-box to put Wolfsburg up 2–1 in the 28th minute over Eintracht Frankfurt, and a late Edin Džeko strike secured a 3–2 win for the Wolves, their first in five games. On the final day of the Bundesliga season, 17 May 2008, Schäfer received the ball from Grafite and hammered the ball into the goal from twenty yards out to score the game winner in the Wolves' 4–2 defeat of Dortmund and secure a spot for Wolfsburg in the UEFA Cup.

On 18 September 2008, Schäfer made his first appearance in European football, helping his side keep a clean sheet in the first round first-leg 1–0 victory over Rapid București. On 24 September, he scored his first DFB-Pokal goal for Wolfsburg, netting with his left foot after a cross from Mahir Sağlık, and also provided an assist to Džeko as the Wolves comfortably defeated FC Oberneuland 7–0. Down 0–2 against Milan at the San Siro on 17 December, he picked out Cristian Zaccardo for Wolfsburg's first goal and a late Sağlık strike completed the comeback, securing a point and top spot in Group E. On 4 March 2009, he provided the assist for Džeko's first goal as Wolfsburg came from 0–2 down to draw level at half-time, but two second-half goals from Claudio Pizarro and a Diego strike secured a 5–2 win for Werder Bremen and a spot in the semi-finals of the German Cup.

On 4 April 2009, Schäfer assisted the go-ahead goal to Džeko in the 63rd minute, as Wolfsburg notched an eighth successive victory and completed an historic 5–1 defeat of Bayern Munich. On 2 May, he provided his eighth Bundesliga assist of the season, picking out Grafite for Wolfsburg's final goal of their 4–0 win over Hoffenheim. On 23 May, Schäfer played the entire match as Wolfsburg defeated Bremen 5–1 at the Volkswagen Arena, securing the club and the player their first Bundesliga title.

In his first Champions League match, Schäfer provided an assist for one of Grafite's three goals as the Wolves dispatched CSKA Moscow 3–1 to top Group B after the first round of fixtures. Schäfer received the first red card of his professional career in the second round of the DFB-Pokal on 23 September 2009, picking up two yellow cards in stoppage time as Wolfsburg fell to a 2–3 defeat to 1. FC Köln.

He made his first appearance of the 2014–15 season in the league on 21 September 2014, coming on as a late substitute for Junior Malanda in the Wolves' 4–1 defeat of Bayer Leverkusen. Schäfer made his first start of the campaign on matchday 3 of the Europa League, playing the entirety of Wolfsburg's 4–2 win over Krasnodar on 23 October. Schäfer continued to deputize in Ricardo Rodríguez's absence, providing an assist for Naldo and helping keep a clean-sheet in a 3–0 win over Mainz on 26 October.

=== Tampa Bay Rowdies ===
In March 2017, Schäfer signed a contract with Tampa Bay Rowdies. He scored seven goals in 45 matches for the club in the United Soccer League.

== International career ==
He made his international debut for Germany on 19 November 2008 in a friendly against England, replacing Marvin Compper in the 2–1 loss. He made his full debut for Germany on 29 May 2009, playing the entirety of their 1–1 draw with China at the Shanghai Stadium. On 12 August 2009, Schäfer participated in his first competitive game for the national side, a 2–0 win over Azerbaijan in a World Cup qualifying match in Baku. His 8th and last international was a friendly against Denmark in August 2010.

== After football ==
In July 2018, Schäfer was appointed as sporting director of VfL Wolfsburg, and in September 2022, it was announced that he would become the club's managing director from February 2023. On 11 April 2024, it was announced that he had left his position at the club with immediate effect.

On 30 June 2024, he was announced as the new managing director for sport at RB Leipzig, effective from 1 August.

== Career statistics ==
=== Club ===
Appearances and goals by club, season and competition
Club	Season	League			National cup (Note: Includes DFB-Pokal, U.S. Open Cup)		Europe		Other		Total	
Club	Season	Division	Apps	Goals	Apps	Goals	Apps	Goals	Apps	Goals	Apps	Goals
1860 Munich	2003–04	Bundesliga	1	0	0	0	—		—		1	0
1860 Munich	2004–05	2. Bundesliga	27	2	1	0	—		—		28	2
1860 Munich	2005–06	2. Bundesliga	32	1	3	0	—		—		35	1
1860 Munich	2006–07	2. Bundesliga	31	0	1	0	—		—		32	0
1860 Munich	Total		91	3	5	0	0	0	0	0	96	3
1860 Munich II	2004–05	Regionalliga Süd	7	3	—		—		—		7	3
VfL Wolfsburg	2007–08	Bundesliga	29	6	3	0	—		—		32	6
VfL Wolfsburg	2008–09	Bundesliga	34	0	4	1	8 (Note: Appearances in UEFA Cup)	0	—		46	1
VfL Wolfsburg	2009–10	Bundesliga	32	0	2	0	12 (Note: Six appearances in UEFA Champions League, six appearances in UEFA Europa League)	0	—		46	0
VfL Wolfsburg	2010–11	Bundesliga	34	0	2	1	—		—		36	1
VfL Wolfsburg	2011–12	Bundesliga	34	5	1	0	—		—		35	5
VfL Wolfsburg	2012–13	Bundesliga	31	0	4	0	—		—		35	0
VfL Wolfsburg	2013–14	Bundesliga	21	1	4	1	—		—		25	2
VfL Wolfsburg	2014–15	Bundesliga	16	0	3	0	6 (Note: Appearances in UEFA Europa League)	0	—		25	0
VfL Wolfsburg	2015–16	Bundesliga	21	1	1	0	5 (Note: Appearances in UEFA Champions League)	0	0	0	27	1
VfL Wolfsburg	2016–17	Bundesliga	4	0	1	0	—		—		5	0
VfL Wolfsburg	Total		256	13	25	3	31	0	0	0	312	16
VfL Wolfsburg II	2013–14	Regionalliga Nord	2	1	—		—		—		2	1
Tampa Bay Rowdies	2017	United Soccer League	30	5	1	0	—		2 (Note: Appearances in USL Cup playoffs)	2	33	7
Tampa Bay Rowdies	2018	United Soccer League	13	0	0	0	—		—		13	0
Tampa Bay Rowdies	Total		43	5	1	0	0	0	2	2	46	7
Career total			399	25	31	3	31	0	2	2	463	30

=== International ===
Appearances and goals by national team and year
National team	Year	Apps	Goals
Germany	2008	1	0
Germany	2009	6	0
Germany	2010	1	0
Total		8	0

== Honours ==
VfL Wolfsburg

- Bundesliga: 2008–09
- DFB-Pokal: 2014–15
- DFL-Supercup: 2015

Individual

- Lower Saxony Footballer of the Year: 2009
- United Soccer League Best XI: 2017
