= Luiz Gustavo =

Brazilian footballer (born 1987)

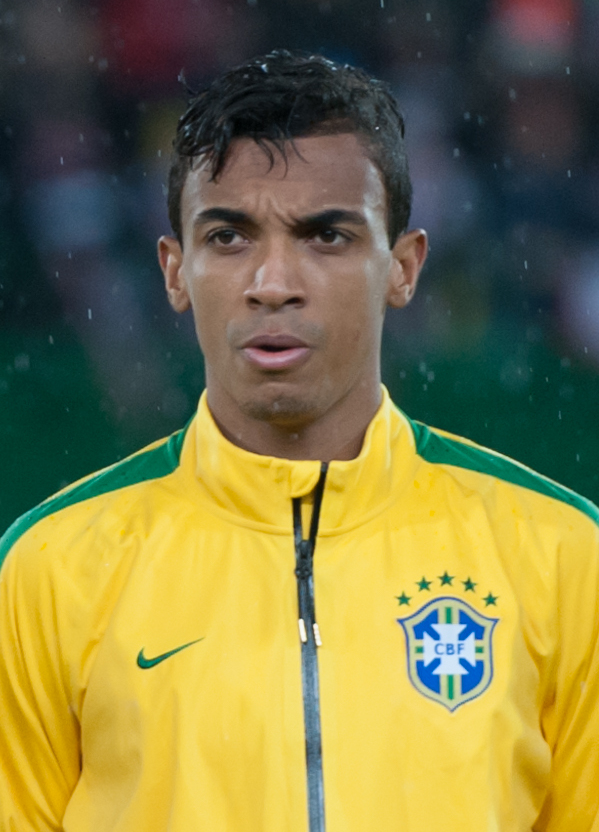
- Luiz Gustavo in 2014

Personal information
- Full name: Luiz Gustavo Dias
- Date of birth: 23 July 1987 (age 39)
- Place of birth: Pindamonhangaba, Brazil
- Height: 1.86 m (6 ft 1 in)
- Position: Defensive midfielder

Team information
- Current team: Athletico Paranaense
- Number: 14

Youth career
- 2005: CRB

Senior career*
Years	Team	Apps	(Gls)
2006	Ipanema		
2006	Universal-AL		
2007–2008	Corinthians Alagoano	21	(2)
2007	→ CRB (loan)	14	(1)
2007–2008	→ TSG Hoffenheim (loan)	27	(0)
2008–2011	TSG Hoffenheim	72	(2)
2011–2013	Bayern Munich	64	(6)
2013–2017	VfL Wolfsburg	109	(7)
2017–2019	Marseille	67	(7)
2019–2022	Fenerbahçe	84	(5)
2022–2023	Al-Nassr	29	(5)
2024–2025	São Paulo	46	(5)
2026–	Athletico Paranaense	29	(4)

International career^{‡}
2011–2016	Brazil	41	(2)
Medal record
Representing Brazil
FIFA Confederations Cup
Winner	2013 Brazil
- * Club domestic league appearances and goals as of 16:09, 10 November 2026 (UTC) ‡ National team caps and goals as of 22:37, 7 August 2021 (UTC)

Luiz Gustavo Dias (born 23 July 1987) is a Brazilian professional footballer who plays as a defensive midfielder for Campeonato Brasileiro Série A club Athletico Paranaense.

From 2007 to 2017 Luiz Gustavo played in Germany, where he represented TSG Hoffenheim, Bayern Munich and VfL Wolfsburg, making 245 Bundesliga appearances and scoring 15 goals. He won six trophies in his time in the country, including the 2012–13 UEFA Champions League with Bayern.

A full international with over 40 caps since his debut in 2011, Luiz Gustavo represented Brazil as they won the 2013 FIFA Confederations Cup and came fourth at the 2014 FIFA World Cup, both on home soil.

== Club career ==
=== Early career ===
Born in Pindamonhangaba, São Paulo, Luiz Gustavo started his professional career at Corinthians Alagoano. In August 2007, he was loaned to German club 1899 Hoffenheim, then of the 2. Bundesliga. On 1 April 2008, Hoffenheim signed Luiz Gustavo on a permanent contract. He went on to play two and a half Bundesliga seasons for the club.

=== Bayern Munich ===
On 3 January 2011, Luiz Gustavo was signed by Bayern Munich. The amount of the transfer fee varies from €15–20 million, depending on different sources. Twelve days later, he made his debut for the Bavarian club, coming on as a second-half substitute in the 1–1 away draw with VfL Wolfsburg. He scored his first goal for the club on 26 February, the equaliser in the 1–3 home loss against Borussia Dortmund, by volleying in Franck Ribéry's cross.

In his first full season at Bayern, he played 46 matches in total, with Bayern finishing runner-up in all three competitions which they contested. His only goal came on 13 August, an added-time strike which won a league match away to VfL Wolfsburg. On 12 May 2012, Luiz Gustavo was selected to start in the centre of midfield in the DFB-Pokal Final, but he was substituted at half-time for Thomas Müller as Bayern were beaten 5–2 by Dortmund. He missed their defeat a week later in the Champions League final, as he was booked in the second leg of their semi-final victory over Real Madrid.

Luiz Gustavo began the 2012–13 season by featuring in Bayern's 2–1 win over Borussia Dortmund in the DFL-Supercup on 12 August. He scored four times in 22 matches as they won the league title. On 25 May 2013, Luiz Gustavo appeared as an added-time substitute for Franck Ribéry as Bayern defeated Borussia Dortmund 2–1 in the Champions League final at Wembley Stadium.

=== VfL Wolfsburg ===
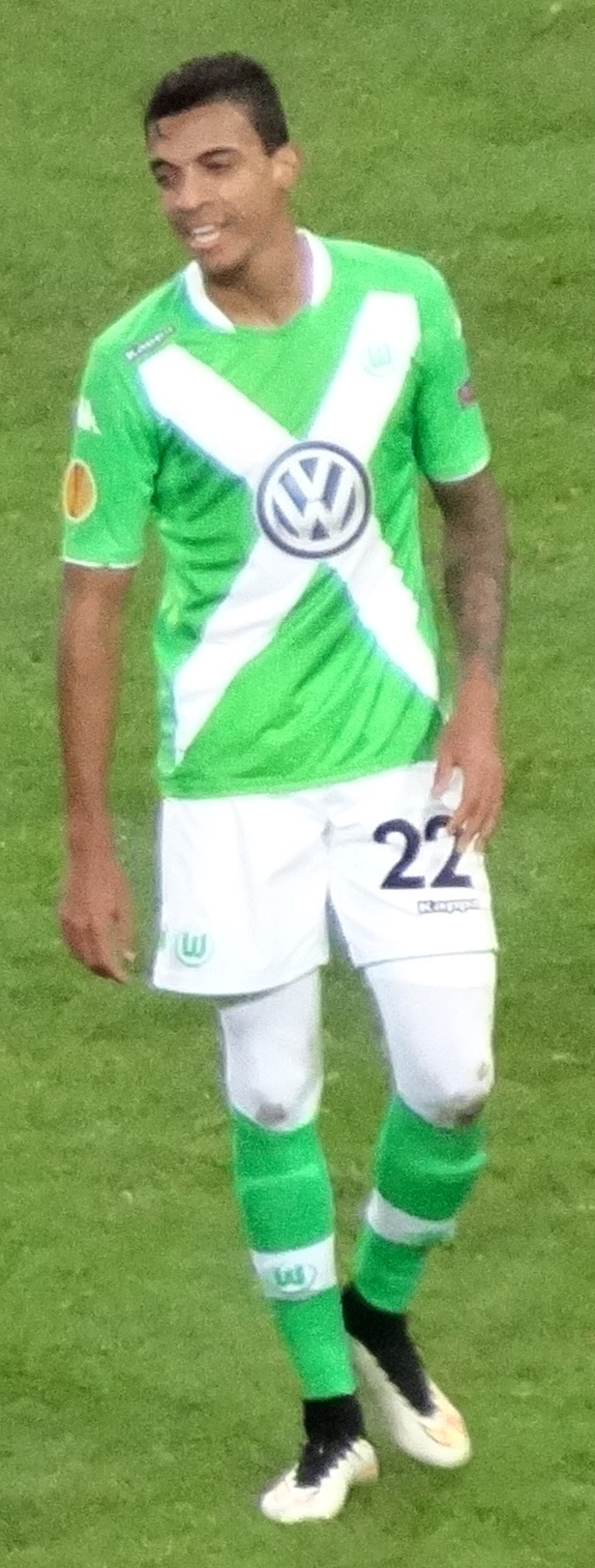
Luiz Gustavo with VfL Wolfsburg in 2014

On 16 August 2013, it was reported that Luiz Gustavo had signed for VfL Wolfsburg for an unspecified amount, on a contract that would tie him to the club till 2018. He made his debut the following day, starting in a 4–0 win over Schalke 04 at the Volkswagen Arena. One week later, in his next appearance, he was sent off for two bookings as his team lost 0–2 at Mainz 05, and he was also dismissed on his return on 14 September in a 1–3 defeat at Bayer Leverkusen. He scored 4 goals in 29 matches as Wolfsburg came fifth to qualify automatically for the group stage of the next season's UEFA Europa League, receiving a third red card on 19 April 2014 in a 3–1 win at rivals Hamburger SV.

Luiz Gustavo scored four times in five matches as Wolfsburg won the DFB-Pokal in his second season, starting with a brace in a 4–1 win over 1. FC Heidenheim in the second round on 29 October 2014, and continuing with a goal in their 4–0 victory at Arminia Bielefeld in the semi-final on 29 April 2015. On 30 May, he scored from a rebounded shot by compatriot Naldo to equalise in the final against Borussia Dortmund, with Wolfsburg eventually winning 3–1 for their first cup honour.

On 29 April 2017 Luiz Gustavo was sent off for the eighth time in his career in a 6–0 defeat to his former club Bayern Munich, in doing so becoming tied with Jens Nowotny for the most red cards in Bundesliga history. Referee Felix Zwayer sent Gustavo off in the 78 minute after he picking up a second yellow card for fouling Renato Sanches. Gustavo had to be restrained by his teammates as he sarcastically applauded the referee and refused to leave the field.

=== Olympique de Marseille ===
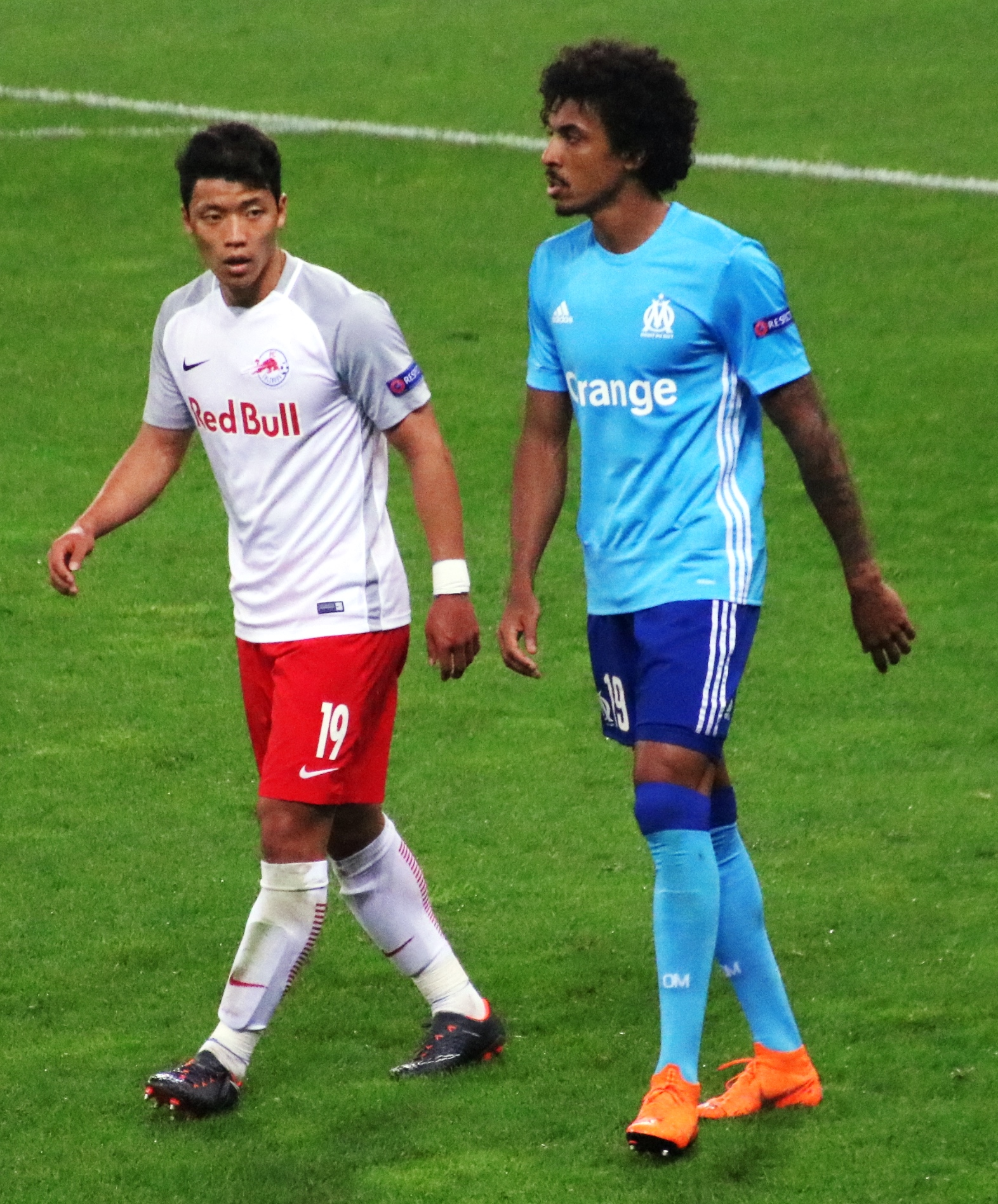
Luiz Gustavo and Salzburg's Hwang Hee-chan in the Europa League semi-finals, May 2018

On 4 July 2017, Luiz Gustavo ended his decade-long spell in German football, signing for France's Olympique de Marseille for a fee of €8 million. He agreed a four-year deal with a club record monthly salary of €750,000. He made his debut 23 days later in a 4–2 home win over Belgium's KV Oostende in the third round of Europa League qualification.

He made his Ligue 1 debut on 6 August, starting in a 3–0 home win over Dijon in the first game of the new season, contributing to the first goal from Clinton N'Jie. On 1 October, he scored his first goal to conclude a 4–2 win at Nice, but was later sent off for a shin-high-challenge on Pierre Lees-Melou. On his return three weeks later, he scored again from 30 yards to open the scoring in a 2–2 draw with rivals Paris Saint-Germain in Le Classique, again at the Stade Vélodrome.

Luiz Gustavo was an ever-present in the 2017–18 UEFA Europa League, playing all of Marseille's 19 matches as they reached the final, losing 3–0 to Atlético Madrid in Lyon. He made 56 official appearances in his first season in France, making him the most selected player by manager Rudi Garcia that year. He was named in the Ligue 1 team of the year at the Trophées UNFP du football.

=== Fenerbahçe ===
On 2 September 2019, Luiz Gustavo signed a four-year deal with Turkish club Fenerbahçe. He made his debut on 16 September in a 3–1 away loss against Alanyaspor. He scored his first goal for the club on 26 October, in a 5–1 home win over Konyaspor.

In his first season at Fenerbahçe, he played 32 matches and scored 3 goals with 1 assist in total. In his second season, he was named one of Fenerbahçe's vice-captains. On 18 October 2020, he captained Fenerbahçe for the first time in a 3–2 away win over Göztepe. Gustavo scored his first goal of the season in Fenerbahçe's 4–1 home win over İstanbul Başakşehir on 23 December.

=== Al-Nassr ===
On 24 July 2022, Luiz Gustavo joined Saudi Arabian club Al-Nassr on a one-year contract, reuniting with former manager Rudi Garcia.

=== São Paulo ===
Signed with São Paulo FC for 2024 season with no transfer costs.

== International career ==
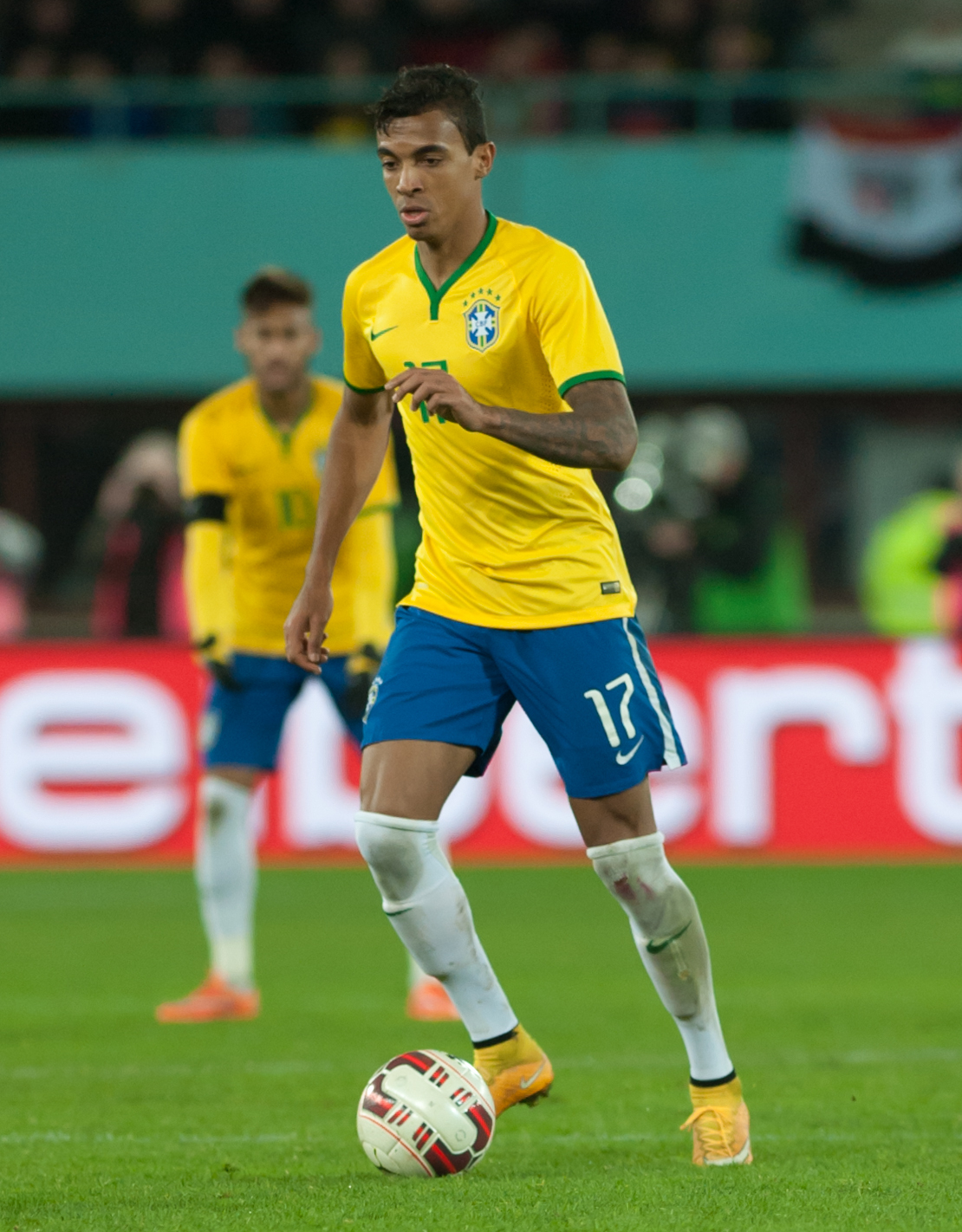
Luiz Gustavo guards the ball playing for Brazil, in a friendly match against Austria in 2014.

Luiz Gustavo made his debut for Brazil on 10 August 2011, coming on as a second-half substitute in a friendly match against Germany.

He was a member of Luiz Felipe Scolari's 23-man squad for the 2013 FIFA Confederations Cup on home soil, and played the full 90 minutes as Brazil defeated world champions Spain 3–0 in the final at the Estádio do Maracanã on 30 June. He scored his first goal for Brazil in a friendly match against Australia on 7 September, later that year.

During the 2014 FIFA World Cup on home soil, and having played every minute up to that point, he was suspended for the quarter-final match against Colombia due to accumulation of yellow cards. He returned to the starting eleven for the next two games as the team finished fourth.

Luiz Gustavo was initially called into Dunga's squad for the 2015 Copa América in Chile, but withdrew with a knee injury which required surgery, and was replaced by Fred.

== Personal life ==
Luiz Gustavo is a devout Catholic, commenting that he "read[s] the Bible a lot and pray[s] twice a day". He became engaged to his girlfriend Milene on 25 December 2010, while on holiday in Brazil. He cites his mother as a big source of inspiration for him because of her dream that he would one day succeed as a player, before her death when he was just 16 years old.

== Career statistics ==
=== Club ===
As of 10 November 2026

Appearances and goals by club, season and competition
Club	Season	League			State league (Note: Includes Campeonato Alagoano, Campeonato Paulista, Campeonato Paranaense)		National cup (Note: Includes Copa do Brasil, DFB-Pokal, Coupe de France, Turkish Cup)		League cup (Note: Includes Coupe de la Ligue)		Continental		Other		Total	
Club	Season	Division	Apps	Goals	Apps	Goals	Apps	Goals	Apps	Goals	Apps	Goals	Apps	Goals	Apps	Goals
Corinthians Alagoano	2007	Alagoano	—		21	2	—		—		—		—		21	2
CRB (loan)	2007	Série B	14	1	—		—		—		—		—		14	1
TSG Hoffenheim	2007–08	2. Bundesliga	27	0	—		3	0	—		—		—		30	0
TSG Hoffenheim	2008–09	Bundesliga	28	0	—		1	0	—		—		—		29	0
TSG Hoffenheim	2009–10	Bundesliga	27	0	—		3	0	—		—		—		30	0
TSG Hoffenheim	2010–11	Bundesliga	17	2	—		3	0	—		—		—		20	2
TSG Hoffenheim	Total		99	2	—		10	0	—		—		—		109	2
Bayern Munich	2010–11	Bundesliga	14	1	—		2	0	—		2 (Note: Appearances in UEFA Champions League)	0	0	0	18	1
Bayern Munich	2011–12	Bundesliga	28	1	—		6	0	—		12	0	—		46	1
Bayern Munich	2012–13	Bundesliga	22	4	—		3	0	—		10	0	1 (Note: Appearance in DFL-Supercup)	0	36	4
Bayern Munich	Total		64	6	—		11	0	—		24	0	1	0	100	6
VfL Wolfsburg	2013–14	Bundesliga	29	4	—		4	0	—		—		—		33	4
VfL Wolfsburg	2014–15	Bundesliga	31	2	—		5	4	—		11 (Note: Appearances in UEFA Europa League)	1	—		47	7
VfL Wolfsburg	2015–16	Bundesliga	22	1	—		1	0	—		7	0	0	0	30	1
VfL Wolfsburg	2016–17	Bundesliga	27	0	—		3	0	—		—		2 (Note: Appearances in Bundesliga relegation play-offs)	0	32	0
VfL Wolfsburg	Total		109	7	—		13	4	—		18	1	2	0	142	12
Marseille	2017–18	Ligue 1	34	5	—		3	1	1	0	19	0	—		57	6
Marseille	2018–19	Ligue 1	30	2	—		1	0	1	1	6	1	—		38	4
Marseille	2019–20	Ligue 1	3	0	—		—		—		—		—		3	0
Marseille	Total		67	7	—		4	1	2	1	25	1	—		98	10
Fenerbahçe	2019–20	Süper Lig	28	3	—		4	0	—		—		—		32	3
Fenerbahçe	2020–21	Süper Lig	34	1	—		3	0	—		—		—		37	1
Fenerbahçe	2021–22	Süper Lig	22	1	—		0	0	—		6	0	—		28	1
Fenerbahçe	Total		84	5	—		7	0	—		6	0	—		97	5
Al-Nassr	2022–23	Saudi Pro League	29	5	—		2	0	—		—		1 (Note: Appearance in Saudi Super Cup)	0	32	5
São Paulo	2024	Série A	28	2	6	2	6	1	—		6 (Note: Appearance(s) in Copa Libertadores)	0	—		46	5
São Paulo	2025	Série A	12	1	0	0	0	0	—		1	0	—		13	1
São Paulo	Total		40	3	6	2	6	1	—		7	0	—		59	6
Athletico Paranaense	2026	Série A	28	4	1	0	3	0	—		—		—		32	4
Career total			535	40	28	4	57	6	2	1	80	2	4	0	694	53

=== International ===
As of match played 29 May 2016

Appearances and goals by national team and year
National team	Year	Apps	Goals
Brazil	2011	2	0
Brazil	2012	0	0
Brazil	2013	14	1
Brazil	2014	15	0
Brazil	2015	7	1
Brazil	2016	3	0
Total		41	2

Scores and results list Brazil's goal tally first.

List of international goals scored by Luiz Gustavo
No.	Date	Venue	Opponent	Score	Result	Competition
1.	7 September 2013	Estádio Nacional Mané Garrincha, Brasília, Brazil	Australia	6–0	6–0	Friendly
2.	26 March 2015	Stade de France, Saint-Denis, France	France	3–1	3–1	Friendly

== Honours ==
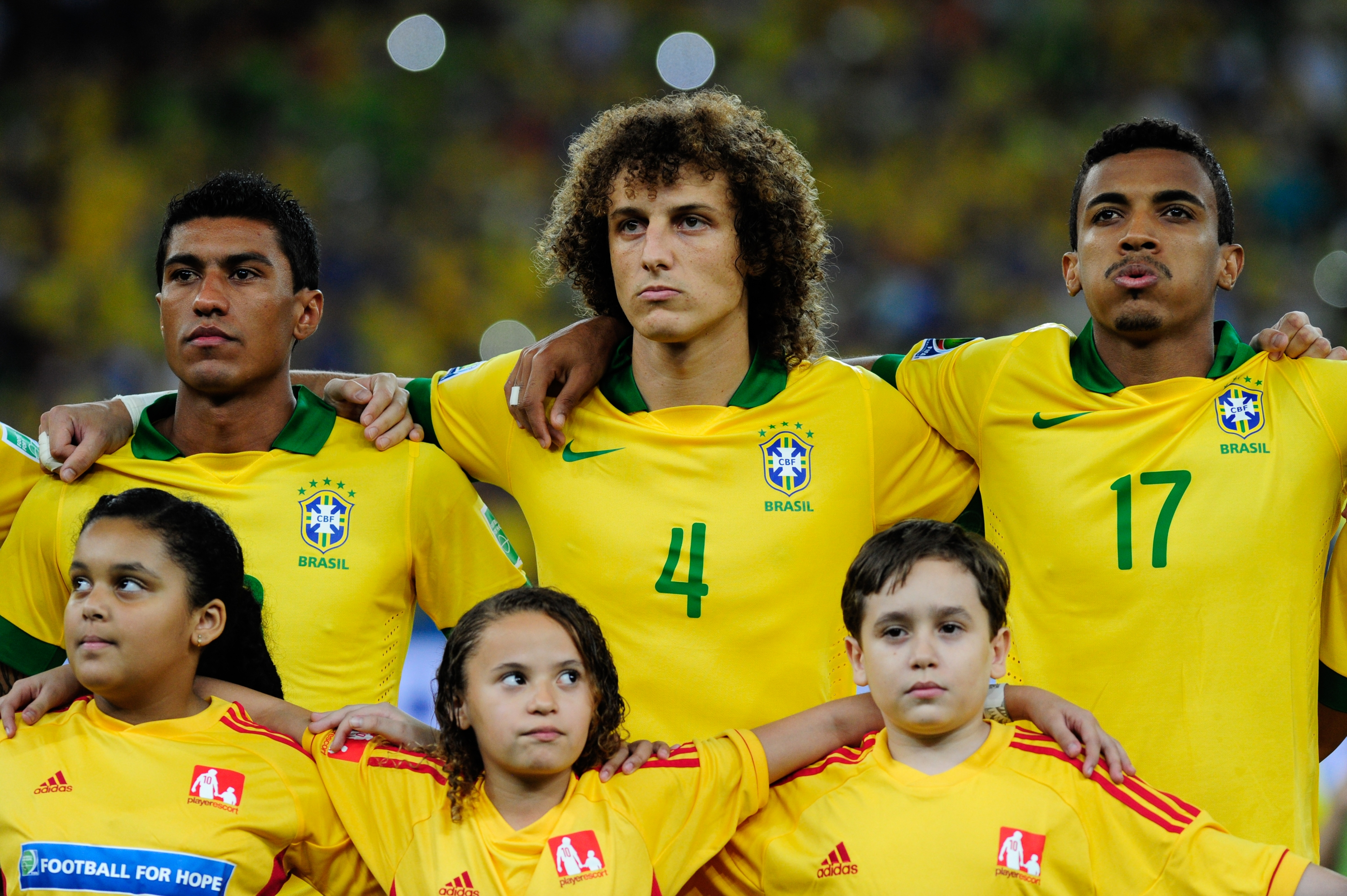
Brazil's Paulinho, David Luiz and Luiz Gustavo lining up before the 2013 FIFA Confederations Cup final, which they won

Bayern Munich

- Bundesliga: 2012–13
- DFB-Pokal: 2012–13
- DFL-Supercup: 2012
- UEFA Champions League: 2012–13

VfL Wolfsburg

- DFB-Pokal: 2014–15
- DFL-Supercup: 2015

São Paulo

- Supercopa do Brasil: 2024

Brazil

- FIFA Confederations Cup: 2013

Individual

- UEFA Europa League Squad of the Season: 2017–18
- Ligue 1 Team of the Year: 2017–18
- Saudi Pro League Player of the Month: October 2022
- Saudi Pro League Team of the Season: 2022–23
