= 2013–14 VfL Wolfsburg season =

VfL Wolfsburg
2013–14 season
- Manager: Dieter Hecking
- Stadium: Volkswagen Arena
- Bundesliga: 5th
- DFB-Pokal: Semi-finals
- Top goalscorer: League: Ivica Olić (14); All: Ivica Olić (15)
Home colours	Away colours	Third colours

The 2013–14 season was the 69th season in the history of VfL Wolfsburg.

In 2013–14 the club played in the Bundesliga, the top tier of German football. It was the club's 17th consecutive season in this league, having been promoted from the 2. Bundesliga in 1997.

The club also took part in the 2013–14 edition of the DFB-Pokal, where it reached the semi-finals before losing to Borussia Dortmund.

== Transfers ==
=== In ===
Date	Position	Player	Club	Fee	Ref
1 July 2013	MF	Luiz Gustavo	Bayern Munich	€16,000,000	
1 July 2013	DF	Timm Klose	FC Basel	€6,000,000	
1 July 2013	MF	Daniel Caligiuri	SC Freiburg	€4,000,000	
28 July 2013	MF	Junior Malanda	Zulte Waregem	€1,500,000	
31 August 2013	DF	Stefan Kutschke	RB Leipzig	Free	
18 January 2014	MF	Kevin De Bruyne	Chelsea	Undisclosed	

=== Out ===
Date	Position	Name	Club	Fee	Ref
1 July 2013	FW	Giovanni Sio	FC Basel	€2,400,000	
1 July 2013	GK	Marwin Hitz	FC Augsburg	€1,000,000	
1 July 2013	DF	Simon Kjær	Lille OSC	€4,000,000	
1 July 2013	MF	Yohandry Orozco	Deportivo Táchira	Free	
25 July 2013	FW	Patrick Helmes	1. FC Köln	Free	
28 July 2013	FW	Rasmus Jönsson	AaB Fodbold	Loan	
28 July 2013	DF	Fagner	Vasco da Gama	Loan	
13 August 2013	MF	Tolga Ciğerci	Hertha BSC	Free	
1 September 2013	MF	Makoto Hasebe	1. FC Nürnberg	€2,000,000	
2 September 2013	FW	Ferhan Hasani	Dynamo Dresden	Free	
13 January 2014	DF	Diego	Atlético Madrid	€5,000,000	
18 January 2014	MF	Koo Ja-cheol	Mainz 05	Loan	

== Matches ==
=== Legend ===
Win Draw Loss Postponed

=== Bundesliga ===
==== League fixtures and results ====
Bundesliga match details
Match	Date	Time	Opponent	Venue	Result F–A	Scorers	Attendance	League position	Ref.
1	10 August 2013	15:30	Hannover 96	A	0–2		44,800	16th	
2	17 August 2013	15:30	Schalke 04	H	4–0	Knoche 55', Vieirinha 61', Naldo 67', Kutschke 90+1'	28,405	8th	
3	24 August 2013	15:30	Mainz 05	A	0–2		27,103	9th	
4	31 August 2013	15:30	Hertha BSC	H	2–0	Olić 42', Diego 45+2' pen.	28,625	8th	
5	14 September 2013	15:30	Bayer Leverkusen	A	1–3	Olić 39'	27,149	12th	
6	21 September 2013	15:30	1899 Hoffenheim	H	2–1	Olić 44', 48'	29,837	6th	
7	28 September 2013	15:30	Bayern Munich	A	0–1		71,000	11th	
8	5 October 2013	15:30	Eintracht Braunschweig	H	0–2		30,000	14th	
9	20 October 2013	17:30	FC Augsburg	A	2–1	Arnold 35', Luiz Gustavo 42'	27,554	9th	
10	26 October 2013	18:30	Werder Bremen	H	3–0	Arnold 7', Olić 72', Perišić 89'	29,488	6th	
11	2 November 2013	18:30	Eintracht Frankfurt	A	2–1	Anderson 2' o.g., Arnold 82'	44,300	5th	
12	9 November 2013	15:30	Borussia Dortmund	H	2–1	Rodriguez 56', Olić 69'	30,000	5th	
13	23 November 2013	15:30	1. FC Nürnberg	A	1–1	Arnold 39'	35,678	5th	
14	29 November 2013	20:30	Hamburger SV	H	1–1	Rodriguez 31' pen.	28,648	6th	
15	8 December 2013	15:30	SC Freiburg	A	3–0	Arnold 8', Olić 11', Schäfer 90+1'	22,800	5th	
16	14 December 2013	18:30	VfB Stuttgart	H	3–1	Rodriguez 38', Diego 53', Perišić 78'	25,501	5th	
17	22 December 2013	15:30	Borussia Mönchengladbach	A	2–2	Diego 53', Dost 85'	53,301	5th	
18	25 January 2014	15:30	Hannover 96	H	1–3	Olić 35'	28,139	6th	
19	1 February 2014	15:30	Schalke 04	A	1–2	Arnold 65'	61,142	6th	
20	8 February 2014	15:30	Mainz 05	H	3–0	Rodriguez 59' pen., Dost 66', Luiz Gustavo 75'	23,520	6th	
21	16 February 2014	17:30	Hertha BSC	A	2–1	Knoche 58', Caligiuri 78'	40,648	5th	
22	22 February 2014	18:30	Bayer Leverkusen	H	3–1	Dost 13', Luiz Gustavo 58', Rodriguez 73'	27,721	5th	
23	2 March 2014	15:30	1899 Hoffenheim	A	2–6	Dost 15', Perišić 76'	24,519	5th	
24	8 March 2014	15:30	Bayern Munich	H	1–6	Naldo 17'	30,000	5th	
25	15 March 2014	15:30	Eintracht Braunschweig	A	1–1	Luiz Gustavo 36'	23,150	6th	
26	22 March 2014	15:30	FC Augsburg	H	1–1	Olić 81'	25,645	6th	
27	25 March 2014	20:00	Werder Bremen	A	3–1	Malanda 2', Perišić 10', Arnold 80'	37,270	5th	
28	29 March 2014	15:30	Eintracht Frankfurt	H	2–1	Olić 69', Naldo 89'	29,159	5th	
29	5 April 2014	18:30	Borussia Dortmund	A	1–2	Olić 34'	80,000	6th	
30	12 April 2014	15:30	1. FC Nürnberg	H	4–1	Olić 19', Perišić 22', 82', Malanda 69'	28,431	5th	
31	19 April 2014	18:30	Hamburger SV	A	3–1	Perišić 2', De Bruyne 42', Olić 49'	56,279	5th	
32	26 April 2014	15:30	SC Freiburg	H	2–2	Perišić 3', 70'	28,255	5th	
33	3 May 2014	15:30	VfB Stuttgart	A	2–1	De Bruyne 13', Olić 90+1'	58,000	5th	
34	10 May 2014	15:30	Borussia Mönchengladbach	H	3–1	De Bruyne 30', Perišić 68', Knoche 81'	30,000	5th	

==== League table ====
Pos	Team	Pld	W	D	L	GF	GA	GD	Pts	Qualification or relegation
3	Schalke 04	34	19	7	8	63	43	+20	64	Qualification for the Champions League group stage
4	Bayer Leverkusen	34	19	4	11	60	41	+19	61	Qualification for the Champions League play-off round
5	VfL Wolfsburg	34	18	6	10	63	50	+13	60	Qualification for the Europa League group stage (Note: The 2013–14 DFB-Pokal finalists (Borussia Dortmund and Bayern Munich) qualified for the UEFA Champions League, thus the three Europa League places were distributed through league positions.)
6	Borussia Mönchengladbach	34	16	7	11	59	43	+16	55	Qualification for the Europa League play-off round
7	Mainz 05	34	16	5	13	52	54	−2	53	Qualification for the Europa League third qualifying round

Source: DFB
Rules for classification: 1) points; 2) goal difference; 3) number of goals scored.

=== DFB-Pokal ===
DFB-Pokal match details
Round	Date	Time	Opponent	Venue	Result F–A	Scorers	Attendance	Ref.
First round	3 August 2013	20:30	Karlsruher SC	A	3–1	Perišić 15', Diego 69', Schäfer 90+2'	15,710	
Second round	24 September 2013	19:00	VfR Aalen	H	2–0	Diego 45+2', Klose 83'	6,718	
Round of 16	3 December 2013	19:00	FC Ingolstadt	H	2–1	Naldo 66', Olić 89'	7,846	
Quarter-finals	12 February 2014	19:00	TSG 1899 Hoffenheim	A	3–2	Rodriguez 26' pen., 44' pen., Dost 64'	13,840	
Semi-finals	15 April 2014	20:30	Borussia Dortmund	A	0–2		80,200	

== Squad ==
=== Squad, appearances and goals ===
No.	Pos	Nat	Player	Total		Bundesliga		DFB-Pokal	
No.	Pos	Nat	Player	Apps	Goals	Apps	Goals	Apps	Goals
1	GK	(Switzerland) SUI	Diego Benaglio	33	0	29	0	4	0
2	DF	(Germany) GER	Patrick Ochs	19	0	17	0	2	0
4	DF	(Germany) GER	Marcel Schäfer	25	0	21	0	4	0
5	DF	(Switzerland) SUI	Timm Klose	12	1	10	0	2	1
6	MF	(Serbia) SRB	Slobodan Medojević	22	0	20	0	2	0
7	MF	(Germany) GER	Daniel Caligiuri	27	1	24	0	3	1
8	FW	(Portugal) POR	Vieirinha	14	1	11	1	3	0
9	FW	(Croatia) CRO	Ivan Perišić	38	11	33	10	5	1
11	FW	(Croatia) CRO	Ivica Olić	39	15	34	14	5	1
12	FW	(Netherlands) NED	Bas Dost	15	5	13	4	2	1
14	MF	(Belgium) BEL	Kevin De Bruyne	18	3	16	3	2	0
15	DF	(Germany) GER	Christian Träsch	26	0	22	0	4	0
19	MF	(Belgium) BEL	Junior Malanda	8	2	7	2	1	0
20	GK	(Germany) GER	Max Grün	7	0	6	0	1	0
21	GK	(Germany) GER	Patrick Drewes	0	0	0	0	0	0
22	MF	(Brazil) BRA	Luiz Gustavo	33	4	29	4	4	0
25	DF	(Brazil) BRA	Naldo	38	4	33	3	5	1
26	DF	(Brazil) BRA	Felipe Lopes	0	0	0	0	0	0
27	MF	(Germany) GER	Maximilian Arnold	30	7	27	7	3	0
29	MF	(Czech Republic) CZE	Jan Polák	21	0	18	0	3	0
30	MF	(Germany) GER	Stefan Kutschke	9	0	8	0	1	0
31	DF	(Germany) GER	Robin Knoche	35	3	32	3	3	0
32	MF	(Germany) GER	Willi Evseev	4	0	3	0	1	0
34	DF	(Switzerland) SUI	Ricardo Rodríguez	38	7	34	5	4	2
39	DF	(Germany) GER	Paul Seguin	0	0	0	0	0	0
Players who left during the season
13	MF	(Japan) JPN	Makoto Hasebe	1	0	1	0	0	0
18	MF	(South Korea) KOR	Koo Ja-cheol	12	0	10	0	2	0
28	MF	(Brazil) BRA	Diego	16	4	13	2	3	2

== Notes ==
- 1.Kickoff time in Central European Time/Central European Summer Time.
