= 2014–15 VfL Wolfsburg season =

VfL Wolfsburg
2014–15 season
- Manager: Dieter Hecking
- Stadium: Volkswagen Arena
- Bundesliga: 2nd
- DFB-Pokal: Winners
- UEFA Europa League: Quarter-finals
- Top goalscorer: League: Bas Dost (16); All: Bas Dost (20)
Home colours	Away colours	Third colours

The 2014–15 VfL Wolfsburg season was the 70th season in the club's football history. In the previous season, Wolfsburg had finished in the fifth place, with only one point separating them from the UEFA Champions League spot occupied by Bayer Leverkusen. Nevertheless, they were granted a place in the UEFA Europa League group stage.

== Players ==
As of 15 September 2014

Note: Flags indicate national team as defined under FIFA eligibility rules; some limited exceptions apply. Players may hold more than one non-FIFA nationality.

No.	Pos.	Nation	Player
1	GK	SUI	Diego Benaglio (captain)
2	DF	GER	Patrick Ochs
3	FW	DEN	Nicklas Bendtner
4	DF	GER	Marcel Schäfer
5	DF	SUI	Timm Klose
7	MF	GER	Daniel Caligiuri
8	MF	POR	Vieirinha
9	MF	CRO	Ivan Perišić
10	MF	GER	Aaron Hunt
12	FW	NED	Bas Dost
14	MF	BEL	Kevin De Bruyne
15	DF	GER	Christian Träsch
17	FW	GER	André Schürrle
19	MF	BEL	Junior Malanda
20	GK	GER	Max Grün

No.	Pos.	Nation	Player
21	GK	GER	Patrick Drewes
22	MF	BRA	Luiz Gustavo
23	MF	FRA	Josuha Guilavogui (on loan from Atlético Madrid)
24	DF	GER	Sebastian Jung
25	DF	BRA	Naldo
26	DF	BRA	Felipe
27	MF	GER	Maximilian Arnold
28	MF	POL	Mateusz Klich
29	MF	CHN	Zhang Xizhe
30	MF	GER	Paul Seguin
31	DF	GER	Robin Knoche
34	DF	SUI	Ricardo Rodríguez
37	DF	GER	Moritz Sprenger

Players out on loan

Note: Flags indicate national team as defined under FIFA eligibility rules; some limited exceptions apply. Players may hold more than one non-FIFA nationality.

No.	Pos.	Nation	Player
—	DF	BRA	Fagner (at Corinthians until December 31)
—	MF	CZE	Václav Pilař (at Viktoria Plzeň)

== Transfers ==
=== In ===
Note: Flags indicate national team as defined under FIFA eligibility rules; some limited exceptions apply. Players may hold more than one non-FIFA nationality.

No.	Pos.	Nation	Player
3	FW	DEN	Nicklas Bendtner (from Arsenal)
10	MF	GER	Aaron Hunt (from Werder Bremen)
23	MF	FRA	Josuha Guilavogui (from Atlético Madrid)
24	DF	GER	Sebastian Jung (from Eintracht Frankfurt)
28	MF	POL	Mateusz Klich (from PEC Zwolle)
17	FW	GER	André Schürrle (from Chelsea)

=== Out ===
Note: Flags indicate national team as defined under FIFA eligibility rules; some limited exceptions apply. Players may hold more than one non-FIFA nationality.

No.	Pos.	Nation	Player
—	MF	GER	Tolga Ciğerci (at Hertha BSC)
—	MF	SRB	Slobodan Medojević (at Eintracht Frankfurt)
—	MF	CIV	Ibrahim Sissoko (at Eskişehirspor)
—	MF	CZE	Jan Polák (at 1. FC Nürnberg)
—	FW	GER	Stefan Kutschke (at SC Paderborn)
—	FW	TUN	Nassim Ben Khalifa (at Grasshoppers)
—	FW	SWE	Rasmus Jönsson (at Aalborg BK)
—	FW	GER	Kevin Scheidhauer (at MSV Duisburg)

== Competitions ==
=== Bundesliga ===
==== League table ====
Pos	Team	Pld	W	D	L	GF	GA	GD	Pts	Qualification or relegation
1	Bayern Munich (C)	34	25	4	5	80	18	+62	79	Qualification for the Champions League group stage
2	VfL Wolfsburg	34	20	9	5	72	38	+34	69	Qualification for the Champions League group stage
3	Borussia Mönchengladbach	34	19	9	6	53	26	+27	66	Qualification for the Champions League group stage
4	Bayer Leverkusen	34	17	10	7	62	37	+25	61	Qualification for the Champions League play-off round
5	FC Augsburg	34	15	4	15	43	43	0	49	Qualification for the Europa League group stage (Note: Since the winners of the 2014–15 DFB-Pokal, VfL Wolfsburg, qualified for the Champions League based on league position, the Europa League group stage spot was passed to the sixth-placed team, Schalke 04; and the Europa League third qualifying round spot was passed to the seventh-placed team, Borussia Dortmund.)

Source: DFB
Rules for classification: 1) points; 2) goal difference; 3) number of goals scored
(C) Champions

==== Results summary ====
Overall								Home						Away					
Pld	W	D	L	GF	GA	GD	Pts	W	D	L	GF	GA	GD	W	D	L	GF	GA	GD
34	20	9	5	72	38	+34	69	13	4	0	38	13	+25	7	5	5	34	25	+9

Last updated: 10 May 2015.
Source: Competitive matches

==== Results by round ====
Round	1	2	3	4	5	6	7	8	9	10	11	12	13	14	15	16	17	18	19	20	21	22	23	24	25	26	27	28	29	30	31	32	33	34
Ground	A	H	A	H	A	H	H	A	H	A	H	A	H	A	H	A	H	H	A	H	A	H	A	A	H	A	H	A	H	A	H	A	H	A
Result	L	D	D	W	L	W	W	W	W	W	W	L	W	W	D	D	W	W	D	W	W	W	W	L	W	D	W	W	D	L	D	W	W	D
Position	14	12	13	11	12	8	5	3	3	2	2	2	2	2	2	2	2	2	2	2	2	2	2	2	2	2	2	2	2	2	2	2	2	2

Updated to match(es) played on 10 May 2015. Source: Competitive matches
A = Away; H = Home; W = Win; D = Draw; L = Loss

==== Matches ====
22 August 2014 1	Bayern Munich	2–1	VfL Wolfsburg	Munich
20:30 CEST (UTC+02:00)	Müller 37'; Robben 47'	Report	Olić 52'; Luiz Gustavo (yellow card) 69'; Arnold (yellow card) 88'	Stadium: Allianz Arena; Attendance: 71,000; Referee: Felix Zwayer

30 August 2014 2	VfL Wolfsburg	2–2	Eintracht Frankfurt	Wolfsburg
15:30 CEST (UTC+02:00)	Naldo 19'; Luiz Gustavo (yellow card) 21'; Guilavogui (yellow card) 59'; Arnold 79' (yellow card) 90+3'	Report	Jung 23' (o.g.); Zambrano (yellow card) 84'; Kadlec 86'	Stadium: Volkswagen Arena; Attendance: 27,528; Referee: Günter Perl

13 September 2014 3	1899 Hoffenheim	1–1	VfL Wolfsburg	Hoffenheim
15:30 CEST (UTC+02:00)	Modeste 55'; Polanski (yellow card) 72'	Report	Guilavogui (yellow card) 84' (yellow-red card) 90+3'; Olić 89'	Stadium: Rhein-Neckar-Arena; Attendance: 23,813; Referee: Wolfgang Stark

21 September 2014 4	VfL Wolfsburg	4–1	Bayer Leverkusen	Wolfsburg
15:30 CEST (UTC+02:00)	Rodríguez 8' (pen.), 63'; Luiz Gustavo (yellow card) 11'; Vieirinha 45'; Hunt 81'	Report	Donati (red card) 7'; Bender (yellow card) 25'; Drmić 29'	Stadium: Volkswagen Arena; Attendance: 27,811; Referee: Deniz Aytekin

24 September 2014 5	Hertha BSC	1–0	VfL Wolfsburg	Berlin
20:00 CEST (UTC+02:00)	Kalou 35'; Ndjeng (yellow card) 47'; Haraguchi (yellow card) 56'; Hosogai (yellow card) 61'	Report	Luiz Gustavo (yellow card) 14'; De Bruyne (yellow card) 90'	Stadium: Olympiastadion; Attendance: 35,847; Referee: Robert Hartmann

27 September 2014 6	VfL Wolfsburg	2–1	Werder Bremen	Wolfsburg
18:30 CEST (UTC+02:00)	Rodríguez 15'; Olić 57'	Report	Busch 37'	Stadium: Volkswagen Arena; Attendance: 29,117; Referee: Peter Sippel

5 October 2014 7	VfL Wolfsburg	1–0	FC Augsburg	Wolfsburg
15:30 CEST (UTC+02:00)	Naldo 58'	Report	Werner (yellow card) 32'; Altıntop (yellow card) 90'	Stadium: Volkswagen Arena; Attendance: 25,734; Referee: Markus Schmidt

18 October 2014 8	SC Freiburg	1–2	VfL Wolfsburg	Freiburg im Breisgau
15:30 CEST (UTC+02:00)	Kerk 90+1'; Sorg (yellow card) 90+3'	Report	Caligiuri 8', 66'; Naldo (yellow card) 33'	Stadium: Dreisamstadion; Attendance: 23,500; Referee: Christian Dingert

26 October 2014 9	VfL Wolfsburg	3–0	Mainz 05	Wolfsburg
15:30 CET (UTC+01:00)	Naldo 15'; Perišić 59'; Guilavogui (yellow card) 63'; Caligiuri 87'	Report	Soto (yellow card) 26'; Geis (yellow card) 49'; Mallı (yellow card) 85'	Stadium: Volkswagen Arena; Attendance: 26,238; Referee: Guido Winkmann

1 November 2014 10	VfB Stuttgart	0–4	VfL Wolfsburg	Stuttgart
15:30 CET (UTC+01:00)	Sararer (yellow card) 28'	Report	Perišić 15', 88'; Knoche 45+1'; De Bruyne 48'	Stadium: Mercedes-Benz Arena; Attendance: 50,050; Referee: Bastian Dankert

9 November 2014 11	VfL Wolfsburg	2–0	Hamburger SV	Wolfsburg
15:30 CET (UTC+01:00)	Olić 27'; Naldo (yellow card) 63'; Hunt 64', (yellow card) 67'	Report	Diekmeier (yellow card) 18'; Ostrzolek (yellow card) 22'; Lasogga (yellow card) 45'	Stadium: Volkswagen Arena; Attendance: 30,000; Referee: Knut Kircher

22 November 2014 12	Schalke 04	3–2	VfL Wolfsburg	Gelsenkirchen
15:30 CET (UTC+01:00)	Choupo-Moting 10', 22'; Fuchs 25'; Huntelaar (yellow card) 87'	Report	Olić 37'; Bendtner 74'; Luiz Gustavo (yellow card) 77'	Stadium: Veltins-Arena; Attendance: 60,989; Referee: Robert Hartmann

30 November 2014 13	VfL Wolfsburg	1–0	Borussia Mönchengladbach	Wolfsburg
15:30 CET (UTC+01:00)	Knoche 12'	Report	Domínguez (yellow card) 53'; Nordtveit (yellow card) 73'	Stadium: Volkswagen Arena; Attendance: 30,000; Referee: Wolfgang Stark

6 December 2014 14	Hannover 96	1–3	VfL Wolfsburg	Hanover
15:30 CET (UTC+01:00)	Joselu 45+1'; Marcelo (yellow card) 71'; Sakai (yellow card) 90+2'	Report	De Bruyne 4', (yellow card) 84'; Dost 69'; Arnold 85'	Stadium: Niedersachsenstadion; Attendance: 41,400; Referee: Markus Schmidt

14 December 2014 15	VfL Wolfsburg	1–1	SC Paderborn	Wolfsburg
17:30 CET (UTC+01:00)	Rafa 17' (o.g.); Perišić (yellow card) 20'; Naldo (yellow card) 50'; Luiz Gustavo (yellow card) 57'; Arnold (yellow card) 73'	Report	Hünemeier (yellow card) 24'; Strohdiek (yellow card) 29'; Meha 51' (pen.)	Stadium: Volkswagen Arena; Attendance: 26,044; Referee: Manuel Gräfe

17 December 2014 16	Borussia Dortmund	2–2	VfL Wolfsburg	Dortmund
20:00 CET (UTC+01:00)	Aubameyang 8'; Subotić (yellow card) 74'; Immobile 78'	Report	De Bruyne 29'; Naldo 85'	Stadium: Westfalenstadion; Attendance: 80,467; Referee: Tobias Welz

20 December 2014 17	VfL Wolfsburg	2–1	1. FC Köln	Wolfsburg
18:30 CET (UTC+01:00)	Dost 16'; Naldo 78'	Report	Maroh 11'	Stadium: Volkswagen Arena; Attendance: 26,824; Referee: Peter Gagelmann

30 January 2015 18	VfL Wolfsburg	4–1	Bayern Munich	Wolfsburg
20:30 CET (UTC+01:00)	Dost 4', 45+2'; Arnold (yellow card) 43'; De Bruyne 53', 73'; Luiz Gustavo (yellow card) 90+1'	Report	Alonso (yellow card) 43'; Schweinsteiger (yellow card) 47'; Bernat 55'	Stadium: Volkswagen Arena; Attendance: 30,000; Referee: Tobias Welz

3 February 2015 19	Eintracht Frankfurt	1–1	VfL Wolfsburg	Frankfurt
20:00 CET (UTC+01:00)	Aigner 58'; Hasebe (yellow card) 72'; Russ (yellow card) 90+2'	Report	Luiz Gustavo (yellow card) 28'; Rodríguez (yellow card) 49'; De Bruyne 88'	Stadium: Commerzbank-Arena; Attendance: 34,400; Referee: Günter Perl

7 February 2015 20	VfL Wolfsburg	3–0	1899 Hoffenheim	Wolfsburg
15:30 CET (UTC+01:00)	Dost 3'; De Bruyne 28', 84'; Schürrle (yellow card) 40'; Guilavogui (yellow card) 80'	Report	Polanski (yellow card) 51'	Stadium: Volkswagen Arena; Attendance: 26,356; Referee: Jochen Drees

14 February 2015 21	Bayer Leverkusen	4–5	VfL Wolfsburg	Leverkusen
15:30 CET (UTC+01:00)	Spahić (yellow card) 50' (yellow-red card) 82'; Son 57', 62', 67'; Boenisch (yellow card) 61'; Bellarabi 72'; Rolfes (yellow card) 79'; Papadopoulos (yellow card) 86'; Castro (yellow card) 88'	Report	Dost 6', 29', 63', 90+3'; Naldo 17' (yellow card) 75'	Stadium: BayArena; Attendance: 29,227; Referee: Bastian Dankert

22 February 2015 22	VfL Wolfsburg	2–1	Hertha BSC	Wolfsburg
17:30 CET (UTC+01:00)	Dost 10', 74'; Rodríguez (yellow card) 37'	Report	Schieber 30'; Schulz (yellow card) 49'; Stocker (yellow card) 69'	Stadium: Volkswagen Arena; Attendance: 27,683; Referee: Guido Winkmann

1 March 2015 23	Werder Bremen	3–5	VfL Wolfsburg	Bremen
15:30 CET (UTC+01:00)	Junuzović 9'; Di Santo 16'; Vieirinha 28' (o.g.); Kroos (yellow card) 69'; Vestergaard (yellow card) 79'	Report	Caligiuri 10', 53'; Arnold 18'; Dost 48', 51'; Guilavogui (yellow card) 58'	Stadium: Weserstadion; Attendance: 40,126; Referee: Marco Fritz

7 March 2015 24	FC Augsburg	1–0	VfL Wolfsburg	Augsburg
15:30 CET (UTC+01:00)	Hitz (yellow card) 12'; Kohr 63'	Report	Naldo (yellow card) 90+2'	Stadium: SGL arena Attendance: 28,721; Referee: Manuel Gräfe

15 March 2015 25	VfL Wolfsburg	3–0	SC Freiburg	Wolfsburg
15:30 CET (UTC+01:00)	De Bruyne 19'; Rodríguez 78' (pen.); Arnold 84'	Report	Torrejón (yellow card) 18'	Stadium: Volkswagen Arena; Attendance: 26,538; Referee: Sascha Stegemann

22 March 2015 26	Mainz 05	1–1	VfL Wolfsburg	Mainz
15:30 CET (UTC+01:00)	Bungert 7'	Report	Luiz Gustavo 61', (yellow card) 66'; Arnold (yellow card) 83'	Stadium: Coface Arena; Attendance: 32,236; Referee: Wolfgang Stark

4 April 2015 27	VfL Wolfsburg	3–1	VfB Stuttgart	Wolfsburg
15:30 CEST (UTC+02:00)	Rodríguez 41' (pen.), 65'; Luiz Gustavo (yellow card) 75'; Schürrle 76'	Report	Harnik 44'; Die (yellow card) 55'; Romeu (yellow card) 64'	Stadium: Volkswagen Arena; Attendance: 30,000; Referee: Tobias Welz

11 April 2015 28	Hamburger SV	0–2	VfL Wolfsburg	Hamburg
18:30 CEST (UTC+02:00)	Díaz (yellow card) 44'; Olić (yellow card) 57'; Müller (yellow card) 72'; Djourou (yellow card) 85' (yellow-red card) 88'	Report	Guilavogui 10'; Arnold (yellow card) 71'; Caligiuri 73'	Stadium: Volksparkstadion; Attendance: 57,000; Referee: Felix Zwayer

19 April 2015 29	VfL Wolfsburg	1–1	Schalke 04	Wolfsburg
17:30 CEST (UTC+02:00)	Benaglio (yellow card) 53'; Perišić (yellow card) 77'; De Bruyne 78'	Report	Kolašinac (yellow card) 33'; Sané 53'; Aogo (yellow card) 65'	Stadium: Volkswagen Arena; Attendance: 30,000; Referee: Christian Dingert

26 April 2015 30	Borussia Mönchengladbach	1–0	VfL Wolfsburg	Mönchengladbach
17:30 CEST (UTC+02:00)	Herrmann (yellow card) 47'; Raffael (yellow card) 77'; Kruse 90'	Report	Arnold (yellow card) 31'; Luiz Gustavo (yellow card) 75'	Stadium: Borussia-Park; Attendance: 52,147; Referee: Bastian Dankert

2 May 2015 31	VfL Wolfsburg	2–2	Hannover 96	Wolfsburg
15:30 CEST (UTC+02:00)	Dost 24'; Perišić 45'; Vieirinha (yellow card) 88'	Report	Briand 47'; Prib (yellow card) 56'; Sané 58'	Stadium: Volkswagen Arena; Attendance: 29,514; Referee: Felix Brych

10 May 2015 32	SC Paderborn	1–3	VfL Wolfsburg	Paderborn
15:30 CEST (UTC+02:00)	Rupp 90+1'	Report	Klose 16'; Dost 25', 82', (yellow card) 72'; Caligiuri (yellow card) 46'; Perišić (yellow card) 77'	Stadium: Benteler Arena; Attendance: 14,659; Referee: Markus Schmidt

16 May 2015 33	VfL Wolfsburg	2–1	Borussia Dortmund	Wolfsburg
15:30 CEST (UTC+02:00)	Caligiuri 1'; Benaglio (yellow card) 11'; Naldo 49'; Perišić (yellow card) 71'; Arnold (yellow card) 83'; De Bruyne (yellow card) 90+2'	Report	Aubameyang 11' (pen.); Subotić (yellow card) 62'; Gündoğan (yellow card) 72'	Stadium: Volkswagen Arena; Attendance: 30,000; Referee: Marco Fritz

23 May 2015 34	1. FC Köln	2–2	VfL Wolfsburg	Cologne
15:30 CEST (UTC+02:00)	Osako 3'; Knoche 61' (o.g.)	Report	Luiz Gustavo 8'; Perišić 15'	Stadium: RheinEnergieStadion; Attendance: 49,200; Referee: Peter Gagelmann

=== DFB-Pokal ===
17 August 2014 Round 1	Darmstadt 98	0–0 (a.e.t.) (4–5 p)	VfL Wolfsburg	Darmstadt
20:30 CEST (UTC+02:00)	Gondorf (yellow card) 17'; Stroh-Engel (yellow card) 81'	Report	Malanda (yellow card) 30'; Arnold (yellow card) 89'; Vieirinha (yellow card) 95'	Stadium: Stadion am Böllenfalltor; Attendance: 13,900; Referee: Peter Gagelmann
	Penalties
	Brégerie (penalty scored); Behrens (penalty scored); Holland (penalty scored); Exslager (penalty missed); Stroh-Engel (penalty scored); Ivana (penalty missed)		(penalty missed) Naldo; (penalty scored) Dost; (penalty scored) Rodríguez; (penalty scored) De Bruyne; (penalty scored) Olić; (penalty scored) Vieirinha

29 October 2014 Round 2	VfL Wolfsburg	4–1	1. FC Heidenheim	Wolfsburg
20:30 CET (UTC+01:00)	Klose (yellow card) 18'; Caligiuri 28', (yellow card) 67'; Dost 43'; Luiz Gustavo 65', 78'; Naldo (yellow card) 82'	Report	Schnatterer 12'; Leipertz (yellow card) 30'	Stadium: Volkswagen Arena; Attendance: 7,608; Referee: Thorsten Kinhöfer

4 March 2015 Round 3	RB Leipzig	0–2	VfL Wolfsburg	Leipzig
19:00 CET (UTC+01:00)	Demme (yellow card) 59'	Report	Caligiuri 20'; Klose 57'	Stadium: Red Bull Arena; Attendance: 43,348; Referee: Thorsten Kinhöfer

7 April 2015 Quarterfinals	VfL Wolfsburg	1–0	SC Freiburg	Wolfsburg
19:00 CEST (UTC+02:00)	Rodríguez 72' (pen.)	Report	Mitrović (yellow card) 60'; Schuster (yellow card) 71'; Sorg (yellow card) 77'	Stadium: Volkswagen Arena; Attendance: 15,237; Referee: Tobias Stieler

29 April 2015 Semifinals	Arminia Bielefeld	0–4	VfL Wolfsburg	Bielefeld
20:30 CEST (UTC+02:00)		Report	Arnold 8', 55'; De Bruyne (yellow card) 27'; Luiz Gustavo 31'; Perišić 51'	Stadium: Bielefelder Alm; Attendance: 26,137; Referee: Tobias Welz

30 May 2015 Final	Borussia Dortmund	1–3	VfL Wolfsburg	Berlin
20:00 CEST (UTC+02:00)	Aubameyang 5'; Mkhitaryan (yellow card) 61'; Schmelzer (yellow card) 84'	Report	Luiz Gustavo 22'; De Bruyne 33', (yellow card) 88'; Dost 38'; Vieirinha (yellow card) 90+3'	Stadium: Olympiastadion; Attendance: 75,815; Referee: Felix Brych

=== UEFA Europa League ===
==== Group stage ====
Pos	Team	Pld	W	D	L	GF	GA	GD	Pts	Qualification	EVE	WOL	KRA	LIL
1	(England) Everton	6	3	2	1	10	3	+7	11	Advance to knockout phase	—	4–1	0–1	3–0
2	(Germany) VfL Wolfsburg	6	3	1	2	14	10	+4	10	Advance to knockout phase	0–2	—	5–1	1–1
3	(Russia) Krasnodar	6	1	3	2	7	12	−5	6		1–1	2–4	—	1–1
4	(France) Lille	6	0	4	2	3	9	−6	4		0–0	0–3	1–1	—

Source: Soccerway
Rules for classification: Group stage tiebreakers

18 September 2014 1	Everton (England)	4–1	VfL Wolfsburg	Liverpool, England
21:05 CEST (UTC+02:00)	Rodríguez 15' (o.g.); Coleman 45+1'; Baines 47' (pen.); Naismith (yellow card) 54'; Mirallas (yellow card) 72', (goal) 89'	Report	Knoche (yellow card) 46'; Rodríguez 90+4'	Stadium: Goodison Park; Attendance: 29,593; Referee: Luca Banti (Italy)

2 October 2014 2	VfL Wolfsburg	1–1	(France) Lille	Wolfsburg, Germany
19:00 CEST (UTC+02:00)	Rodríguez (yellow card) 75'; Perišić (yellow card) 79'; De Bruyne 82'; Luiz Gustavo (yellow card) 90'	Report	Origi 77' (pen.); Gueye (yellow card) 84'	Stadium: Volkswagen Arena; Attendance: 16,097; Referee: Ovidiu Hațegan (Romania)

23 October 2014 3	Krasnodar (Russia)	2–4	VfL Wolfsburg	Krasnodar, Russia
18:00 CEST (UTC+02:00)	Granqvist 51' (pen.); Sigurðsson (yellow card) 56'; Laborde (yellow card) 73'; Wánderson 86'	Report	Granqvist 37' (o.g.); De Bruyne 46', 79'; Naldo (yellow card) 51'; Luiz Gustavo 64'	Stadium: Kuban Stadium; Attendance: 22,500; Referee: Artur Soares Dias (Portugal)

6 November 2014 4	VfL Wolfsburg	5–1	(Russia) Krasnodar	Wolfsburg, Germany
21:05 CET (UTC+01:00)	Hunt 47', 57'; De Bruyne (yellow card) 63'; Guilavogui 73'; Bendtner 89' (pen.), 90+1'	Report	Laborde (yellow card) 39'; Wánderson 72'; Sigurðsson (yellow card) 85'	Stadium: Volkswagen Arena; Attendance: 16,674; Referee: Pol van Boekel (Netherlands)

27 November 2014 5	VfL Wolfsburg	0–2	(England) Everton	Wolfsburg, Germany
19:00 CET (UTC+01:00)	Luiz Gustavo (yellow card) 45+2'; Perišić (yellow card) 58'	Report	Lukaku 43'; Bešić (yellow card) 73'; Mirallas 75'	Stadium: Volkswagen Arena; Attendance: 23,375; Referee: Fernando Teixeira Vitienes (Spain)

11 December 2014 6	Lille (France)	0–3	VfL Wolfsburg	Villeneuve-d'Ascq, France
21:05 CET (UTC+01:00)	Mavuba (yellow card) 63'; Balmont (yellow card) 73'; Souaré (yellow card) 88'	Report	Vieirinha 45+1'; Guilavogui (yellow card) 47' (yellow-red card) 55'; Rodríguez 65', 90' (pen.); Luiz Gustavo (yellow card) 90+1'	Stadium: Stade Pierre-Mauroy; Attendance: 33,559; Referee: Halis Özkahya (Turkey)

==== Knockout phase ====
===== Round of 32 =====
19 February 2015 First leg	VfL Wolfsburg	2–0	(Portugal) Sporting CP	Wolfsburg, Germany
19:00 CET (UTC+01:00)	Dost 46', 63'; Arnold (yellow card) 51'	Report	Rosell (yellow card) 13'; Carrillo (yellow card) 48'	Stadium: Volkswagen Arena; Attendance: 19,207; Referee: Alon Yefet (Israel)

26 February 2015 Second leg	Sporting CP (Portugal)	0–0 (0–2 agg.)	VfL Wolfsburg	Lisbon, Portugal
21:05 CET (UTC+01:00)	Oliveira (yellow card) 21'	Report	Naldo (yellow card) 81'; Caligiuri (yellow card) 85'	Stadium: Estádio José Alvalade; Attendance: 23,097; Referee: Ruddy Buquet (France)

===== Round of 16 =====
12 March 2015 First leg	VfL Wolfsburg	3–1	(Italy) Internazionale	Wolfsburg, Germany
19:00 CET (UTC+01:00)	Naldo 28', (yellow card) 71'; De Bruyne 63', 76'	Report	Palacio 6'; Icardi (yellow card) 30'; D'Ambrosio (yellow card) 34'; Vidić (yellow card) 74'; Ranocchia (yellow card) 83'	Stadium: Volkswagen Arena; Attendance: 25,374; Referee: Szymon Marciniak (Poland)

19 March 2015 Second leg	Internazionale (Italy)	1–2 (2–5 agg.)	VfL Wolfsburg	Milan, Italy
21:05 CET (UTC+01:00)	Palacio 71'; Medel (yellow card) 87'	Report	Caligiuri 24'; De Bruyne (yellow card) 84'; Arnold (yellow card) 87'; Bendtner 89'	Stadium: San Siro; Attendance: 38,800; Referee: Mark Clattenburg (England)

===== Quarterfinals =====
16 April 2015 First leg	VfL Wolfsburg	1–4	(Italy) Napoli	Wolfsburg, Germany
21:05 CEST (UTC+02:00)	Bendtner 80' (yellow card) 80'	Report	Higuaín 15'; Hamšík 23', 64'; Gabbiadini 76'	Stadium: Volkswagen Arena; Attendance: 25,112; Referee: Antonio Mateu Lahoz (Spain)

23 April 2015 Second leg	Napoli (Italy)	2–2 (6–3 agg.)	VfL Wolfsburg	Naples, Italy
21:05 CEST (UTC+02:00)	Callejón 50'; Mertens 65'	Report	Klose 71'; Perišić 73'	Stadium: Stadio San Paolo; Attendance: 27,262; Referee: Cüneyt Çakır (Turkey)

== Statistics ==
=== Appearances and goals ===
No.	Pos	Nat	Player	Total		Bundesliga		DFB-Pokal		UEFA Europa League	
No.	Pos	Nat	Player	Apps	Goals	Apps	Goals	Apps	Goals	Apps	Goals
Goalkeepers
1	GK	(Switzerland) SUI	Diego Benaglio	48	0	31	0	5	0	12	0
20	GK	(Germany) GER	Max Grün	4	0	3	0	1	0	0	0
21	GK	(Germany) GER	Patrick Drewes	0	0	0	0	0	0	0	0
Defenders
2	DF	(Germany) GER	Patrick Ochs	0	0	0	0	0	0	0	0
4	DF	(Germany) GER	Marcel Schäfer	25	0	7+9	0	2+1	0	3+3	0
5	DF	(Switzerland) SUI	Timm Klose	19	3	11+1	1	4	1	2+1	1
15	DF	(Germany) GER	Christian Träsch	21	0	8+4	0	1+2	0	5+1	0
24	DF	(Germany) GER	Sebastian Jung	30	0	17+5	0	2	0	5+1	0
25	DF	(Brazil) BRA	Naldo	49	8	32	7	6	0	11	1
26	DF	(Brazil) BRA	Felipe	0	0	0	0	0	0	0	0
31	DF	(Germany) GER	Robin Knoche	41	2	25+2	2	2+1	0	11	0
34	DF	(Switzerland) SUI	Ricardo Rodríguez	39	10	26	6	4	1	9	3
37	DF	(Germany) GER	Moritz Sprenger	0	0	0	0	0	0	0	0
Midfielders
7	MF	(Germany) GER	Daniel Caligiuri	45	10	18+10	7	5+1	2	6+5	1
8	MF	(Portugal) POR	Vieirinha	46	2	25+6	1	5	0	8+2	1
9	MF	(Croatia) CRO	Ivan Perišić	35	7	21+3	5	2	1	6+3	1
10	MF	(Germany) GER	Aaron Hunt	22	4	3+12	2	1+1	0	3+2	2
14	MF	(Belgium) BEL	Kevin De Bruyne	51	16	34	10	6	1	11	5
22	MF	(Brazil) BRA	Luiz Gustavo	47	7	30+1	2	5	4	11	1
23	MF	(France) FRA	Josuha Guilavogui	42	2	21+6	1	2+3	0	9+1	1
27	MF	(Germany) GER	Maximilian Arnold	40	6	17+10	4	4+1	2	2+6	0
28	MF	(Poland) POL	Mateusz Klich	0	0	0	0	0	0	0	0
29	MF	(China) CHN	Zhang Xizhe	0	0	0	0	0	0	0	0
30	MF	(Germany) GER	Paul Seguin	1	0	0	0	0+1	0	0	0
Forwards
3	FW	(Denmark) DEN	Nicklas Bendtner	28	5	5+13	1	0+2	0	2+6	4
12	FW	(Netherlands) NED	Bas Dost	36	20	17+4	16	5+1	2	6+3	2
17	FW	(Germany) GER	André Schürrle	22	1	7+7	1	2+2	0	4	0
Players transferred out during the season
6	MF	(Serbia) SRB	Slobodan Medojević	1	0	0	0	0+1	0	0	0
11	FW	(Croatia) CRO	Ivica Olić	20	5	12+2	5	1	0	4+1	0
19	MF	(Belgium) BEL	Junior Malanda	15	0	4+6	0	1+1	0	2+1	0

Last updated: 30 May 2015
Source: Competitions

=== Goalscorers ===
This includes all competitive matches. The list is sorted by shirt number when total goals are equal.

Rank	Pos.	No.	Nat.	Name	Bundesliga	DFB-Pokal	Europa League	Total
1	FW	12	(Netherlands)	Bas Dost	16	2	2	20
2	MF	14	(Belgium)	Kevin De Bruyne	10	1	5	16
3	DF	34	(Switzerland)	Ricardo Rodríguez	6	1	3	10
3	MF	7	(Germany)	Daniel Caligiuri	7	2	1	10
5	DF	25	(Brazil)	Naldo	7	0	1	8
6	FW	9	(Croatia)	Ivan Perišić	5	1	1	7
6	MF	22	(Brazil)	Luiz Gustavo	2	4	1	7
8	MF	27	(Germany)	Maximilian Arnold	4	2	0	6
9	FW	3	(Denmark)	Nicklas Bendtner	1	0	4	5
9	FW	11	(Croatia)	Ivica Olić	5	0	0	5
11	MF	10	(Germany)	Aaron Hunt	2	0	2	4
12	DF	5	(Switzerland)	Timm Klose	1	1	1	3
13	MF	8	(Portugal)	Vieirinha	1	0	1	2
13	MF	23	(France)	Josuha Guilavogui	1	0	1	2
13	DF	31	(Germany)	Robin Knoche	2	0	0	2
16	MF	17	(Germany)	André Schürrle	1	0	0	1
Own goals					1	0	1	2
Total					72	14	24	109

Last updated on 30 May 2015
