= Ricardo Rodriguez (footballer) =

Swiss footballer (born 1992)

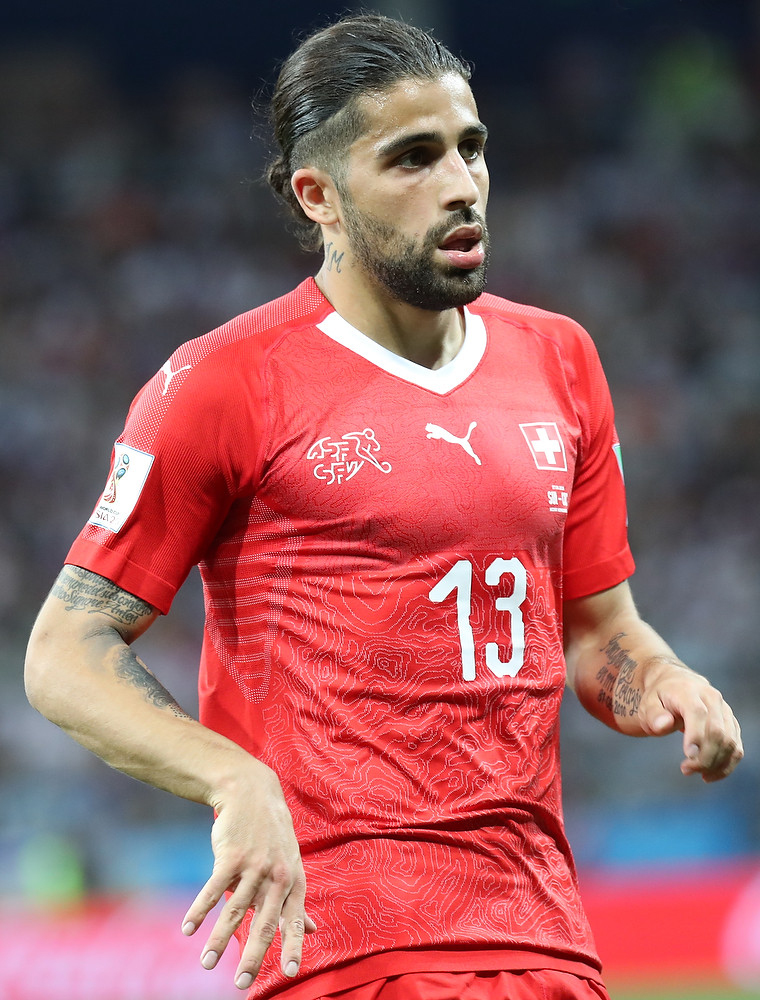
- Rodriguez playing for Switzerland at the 2018 FIFA World Cup

Personal information
- Full name: Ricardo Iván Rodríguez Araya
- Date of birth: 25 August 1992 (age 34)
- Place of birth: Zürich, Switzerland
- Height: 1.82 m (6 ft 0 in)
- Position: Left-back

Team information
- Current team: Torino
- Number: 13

Youth career
- 2001–2002: FC Schwamendingen
- 2002–2010: Zürich

Senior career*
Years	Team	Apps	(Gls)
2010–2012	Zürich	35	(2)
2012–2017	VfL Wolfsburg	149	(15)
2017–2020	AC Milan	74	(1)
2020	→ PSV (loan)	6	(0)
2020–2024	Torino	120	(1)
2024–2026	Betis	41	(0)
2026–	Torino	0	(0)

International career^{‡}
2009–2010	Switzerland U17	5	(3)
2009–2010	Switzerland U18	10	(4)
2010–2011	Switzerland U19	15	(5)
2011–2012	Switzerland U23	3	(0)
2011–	Switzerland	150	(10)
Medal record
Men's football
Representing Switzerland
FIFA U-17 World Cup
Winner	2009	U-17 Team
- * Club domestic league appearances and goals as of 23:03, 23 May 2026 (UTC) ‡ National team caps and goals as of 22:28, 16 November 2026 (UTC)

Ricardo Iván Rodríguez Araya (born 25 August 1992) is a Swiss professional footballer who plays as a left-back for Serie A club Torino and the Switzerland national team.

Rodriguez began his professional career at local club FC Zürich in 2010, having spent eight years in the youth setup. After breaking through into the first team at Zürich, he was sold to VfL Wolfsburg in January 2012 for £7.5 million. Rodriguez played 184 games across all competitions for Wolfsburg, scoring 22 goals and winning the DFB-Pokal and DFL-Supercup in 2015. In 2017, he signed for AC Milan, where he played for three seasons. He was also loaned to Dutch side PSV before joining fellow Italian club Torino in 2020. After his four-year stint at Torino, he joined La Liga team Real Betis in 2024, guiding them to reach their first European final in the club's history.

Rodriguez has earned caps at every level of the Swiss national team setup, winning the FIFA U17 World Cup in 2009. A full international for Switzerland since 2011, Rodriguez has earned over 140 caps for the country. He was part of the Swiss team at the 2012 Olympics, and also represented the senior side at four FIFA World Cups (in 2014, 2018, 2022 and 2026), and three UEFA European Championships (in 2016, 2020 and 2024). In 2014, he was voted Swiss Footballer of the Year.

== Club career ==
=== Zürich ===
Born to a Galician father and a Chilean mother of Spanish (Basque) descent, Rodriguez began playing football at the highly regarded youth club FC Schwamendingen in 2001 before joining the youth setup of FC Zürich as an 10-year-old in 2002. He was promoted to the senior squad in 2009 at age 16, making the bench for Zürich's 2–3 defeat to NK Maribor in the first leg of their third qualifying round Champions League tie on 29 July 2009.

He made his Zürich debut as a 17-year-old in the 25th round of the Swiss Super League on 21 March 2010, replacing the injured Hannu Tihinen in the first half of the 2–0 win over Bellinzona. His full debut came in the Zürich Derby against Grasshoppers on 5 April, playing the entire 3–2 win for the hosts.

He made only his second start in the first match of the Swiss Super League season on 20 July 2010, playing the full 90 minutes in a 2–3 defeat to rivals FC Basel. On 28 April 2011, he scored his first professional goal for the club, opening the scoring for the hosts as they ran out 3–0 winners over Neuchâtel Xamax at the Letzigrund.

Rodriguez made his European debut in the first-leg of their third qualifying round tie against Standard Liège on 27 July 2011. He played the entire match and provided the cross for fellow Zürich youth team graduate Admir Mehmedi as the Swiss secured a 1–1 draw at the Stade Maurice Dufrasne in Belgium. In the second leg, Rodriguez missed from an open goal from close range but Zürich won 1–0 to earn a spot in the play-off round against Bayern Munich. He played the entirety of both play-off matches against Bayern, but the Swiss side fell 0–3 on aggregate and dropped into the Europa League.

On 26 October 2011, Rodriguez scored his second goal for the club, netting his side's second from the penalty spot, in a 2–0 win over FC Thun. The club's final Super League match before the winter break on 10 December 2011, turned out to be Rodriguez's last in a Zürich shirt, playing the entire 1–1 draw with FC Sion. On 11 January 2012, Zürich officials announced that the club had accepted a bid for Rodriguez by German side VfL Wolfsburg and that he was on the verge of completing the transfer, subject to a medical. Despite being sold midway through the season, Rodriguez was voted as the Fans' Player of the Season on 4 June 2012, ahead of Oliver Buff and Pedro Henrique.

=== VfL Wolfsburg ===
==== Early career ====
VfL Wolfsburg purchased Rodriguez as a 19-year-old on 13 January 2012 for £7.5 million with the player signing a four-and-a-half-year deal. He quickly asserted himself into the first-team lineup, making his Bundesliga debut the next day against 1. FC Köln, a 1–0 victory for the Wolves. Rodriguez went on to play every game of the season from that point on without being substituted, becoming a favorite on the left of the defense for manager Felix Magath.

Through the first ten league games of the following campaign, Rodriguez was once again an ever-present in the squad, featuring in all the outings, starting eight. But Magath was sacked after a poor run of form in the league and when Lorenz-Günther Köstner was installed as interim manager, the more experienced Marcel Schäfer was preferred at left back. Once Dieter Hecking was appointed manager though, Rodriguez won his place back in the first team.

==== 2013–14 season ====
On 9 November 2013, he scored his first goal for Wolfsburg, from a direct free kick in a home Bundesliga match against Borussia Dortmund. The match ended in a 2–1 win for Wolfsburg, although they were losing at half-time. His second goal for Wolfsburg came from the penalty spot against Hamburg on 29 November, earning his side a 1–1 draw. He opened the scoring in their Bundesliga match on 14 December, curling the ball past keeper Sven Ulreich, as Wolfsburg won 3–1.

He finished the 2013–14 season with five league goals, in addition to nine assists. He failed to make it into the Bundesliga Team of the Season, but was included in a list of the Best Defenders for the 2013–14 campaign. Rodriguez's nine assists also meant that he created more goals than any other full-back in Europe. His impressive displays during the season included 2.3 key passes per game, the same number as Andrea Pirlo, the two-time reigning Serie A Footballer of the Year, and 2.6 successful dribbles per game, more than Cristiano Ronaldo, the reigning Ballon d'Or winner.

==== 2014–15 season ====
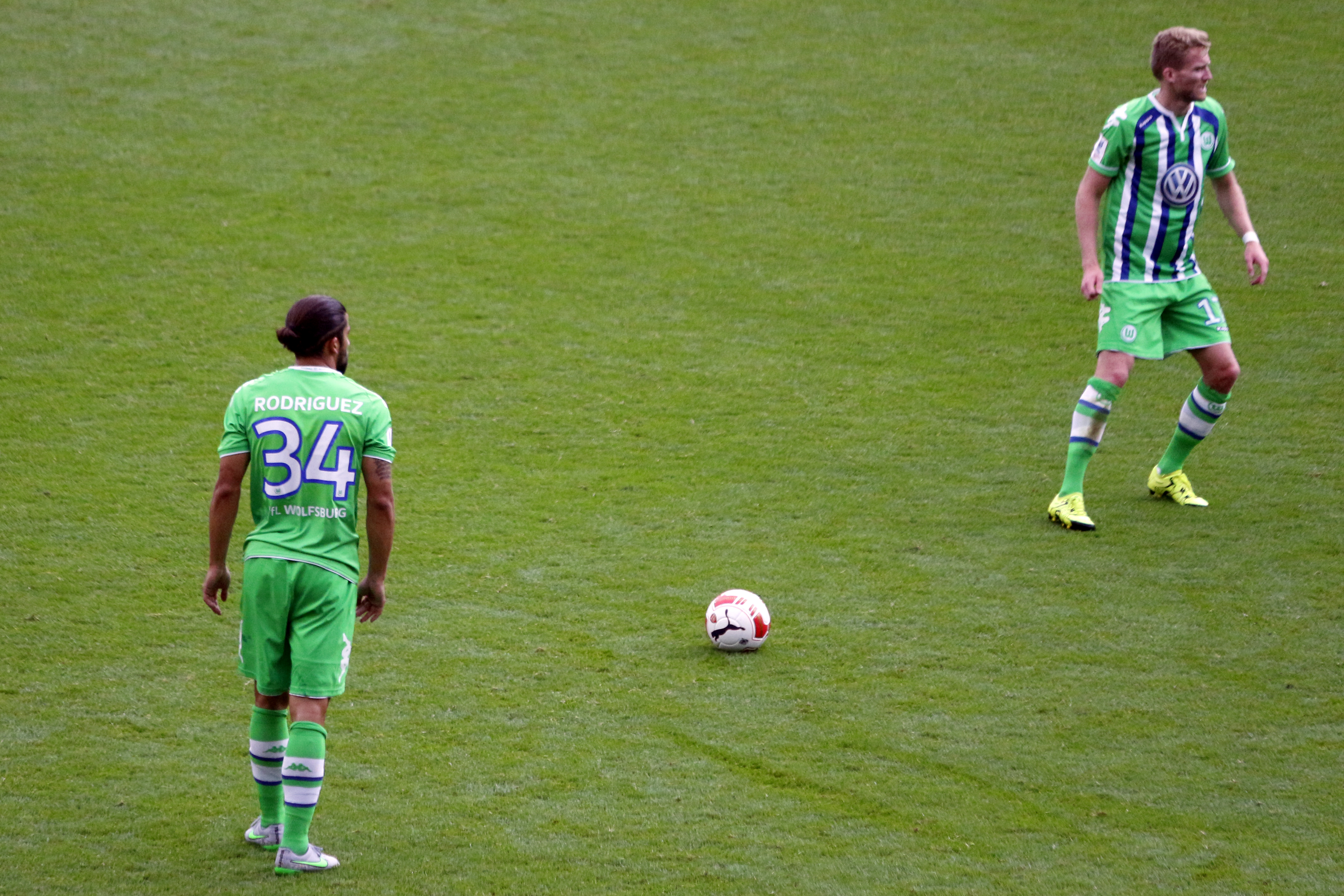
Rodriguez taking a free-kick for Wolfsburg in 2015

He scored his first ever goal in European football for Wolfsburg on 18 September 2014, netting directly from a free-kick after having previously scored an own-goal in a 4–1 defeat to English side Everton. Three days later, Rodriguez scored twice more for Wolfsburg, once from the penalty spot and a volley from a Kevin De Bruyne corner, as Wolfsburg defeated Bayer Leverkusen 4–1. He scored his third league goal of the season against Werder Bremen on 27 September, converting a De Bruyne cross to put Wolfsburg up 1–0 in an eventual 2–1 victory.

In October 2014, Rodriguez was ruled out for a number of weeks with a troubled patella tendon and thigh. On 31 October, his agent, Roger Wittman, confirmed that Rodriguez and Wolfsburg had opened contract talks to extend his current deal beyond 2016. Rodriguez scored twice in Wolfsburg's 3–0 win away to Lille on 11 December, a result which advanced his side into the Europa League knockout stage instead of their opponents. In January 2015, he signed a new contract up to June 2019. He scored the only goal of the game from the penalty spot on 7 April, as Wolfsburg defeated SC Freiburg to reach the semi-finals of the DFB-Pokal, also making a goalline clearance later on. In the final on 30 May, he played the full 90 minutes as Wolfsburg won their first cup, defeating Borussia Dortmund 3–1.

==== 2015–16 season ====
Rodriguez played the full 90 minutes of Wolfsburg's victory over Bayern Munich in the 2015 DFL-Supercup on 1 August, scoring their first attempt in the penalty shootout after a 1–1 draw.

On 28 August 2015, he managed to score his first goal of the season against from the spot. He also assisted Timm Klose's goal later in that match as Wolfsburg beat Schalke 3–0. He scored another penalty in a 2–1 loss against Borussia Dortmund on 5 December.

On 6 April 2016, as Wolfsburg hosted Real Madrid in the first leg of the quarter-finals of the 2015–16 UEFA Champions League, Rodriguez scored a penalty to open a surprise 2–0 victory. By sending Keylor Navas the wrong way, he was the first player to score against Real's goalkeeper in the tournament for 738 minutes.

==== 2016–17 season ====
On 20 August 2016, Rodriguez played his first game of the season in a 2–1 win over FSV Frankfurt in DFB-Pokal. He also played Wolfsburg's opening ‌Bundesliga match of the season, in which he scored a freekick in a 2–0 win over Augsburg.

In January 2017, Rodriguez was a target for Inter Milan and agreed to a move, but the Italian club refused to pay a fee high enough to trigger his release clause of £18.5 million.

=== AC Milan ===
On 8 June 2017, it was announced that Rodriguez joined Serie A club AC Milan on a four-year deal. The fee was reported as €15 million plus €2 million in bonuses. He chose the number 68 shirt, after the year his mother was born.

He played his first official match for Milan and managed to score his first goal, a free kick, to win the first leg of Milan's Europa League qualification match against CS U Craiova on 27 July. He also played in the second leg the following week and assisted Patrick Cutrone's goal from the set piece as Milan beat their opponent 2–0. Rodriguez made his Serie A debut in a 3–0 home victory against Crotone on 21 August, and his first league goal came from a penalty kick in a 2–0 win against SPAL at the San Siro on 20 September. On 15 October in the Derby della Madonnina, he gave away a late penalty from which Mauro Icardi completed his hat-trick to win the game 3–2 for Inter. Since then, whilst being a regular for Milan, he has not reached the heights that were expected of him, with Milan failing repeatedly to reach the Champions League. Most recently they failed in 2019 when Atalanta qualified for the first time at their expense.

==== Loan to PSV ====
On 30 January 2020, he was loaned to Dutch club PSV until the end of the 2019–20 season.

=== Torino ===
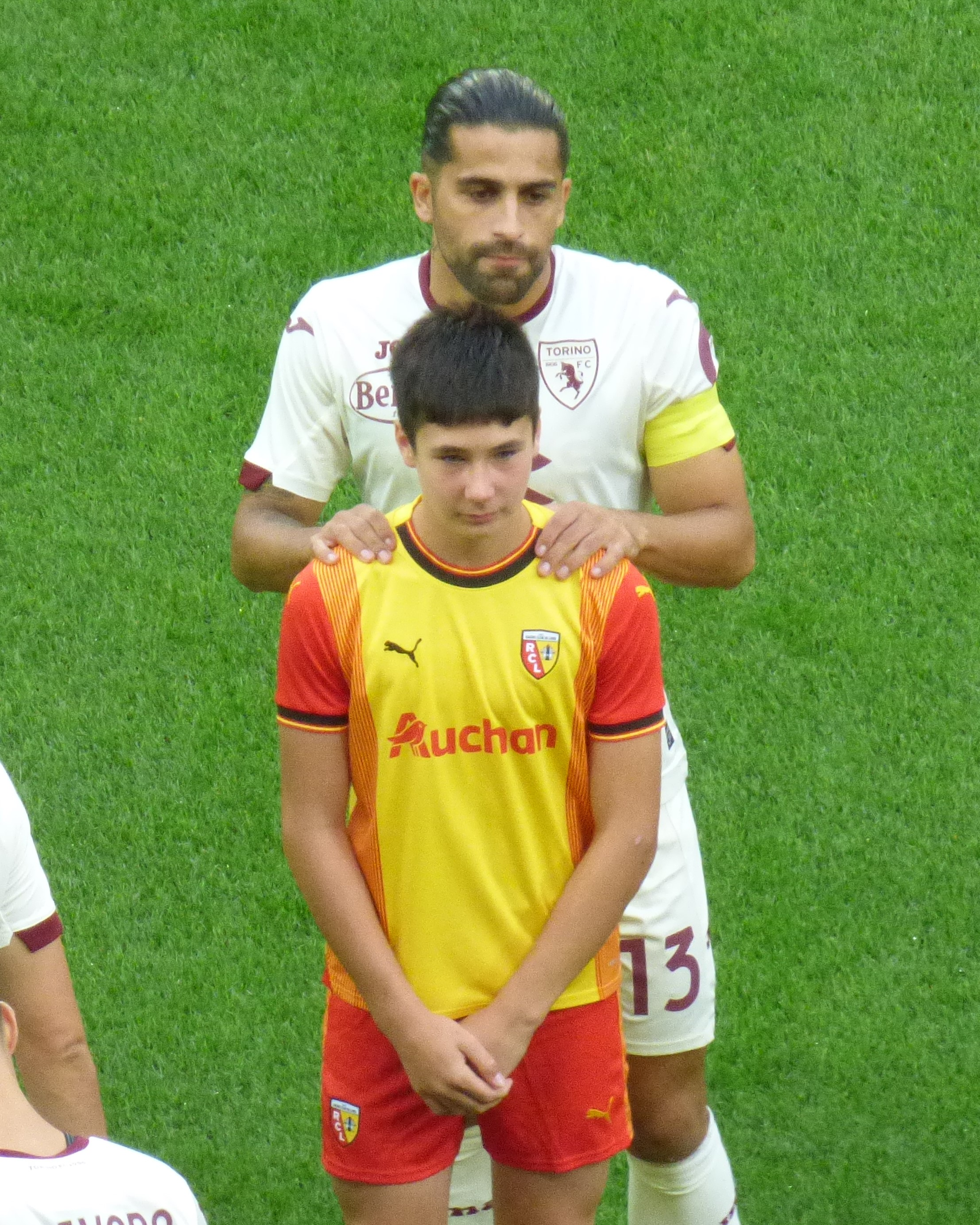
Rodriguez with Torino in 2023

On 19 August 2020, Rodriguez signed with Torino on a 4-year deal.

Rodriguez left the club on 1 July 2024 when his contract expired. In his four years with the club, he made 129 appearances across all competitions, scoring one goal.

=== Betis ===
On 6 August 2024, La Liga club Real Betis announced the signing of Rodriguez, contract until 30 June 2026.

=== Return to Torino ===
On 3 September 2026, Rodriguez returned to Torino permanently, signing a one-year contract with the club.

== International career ==
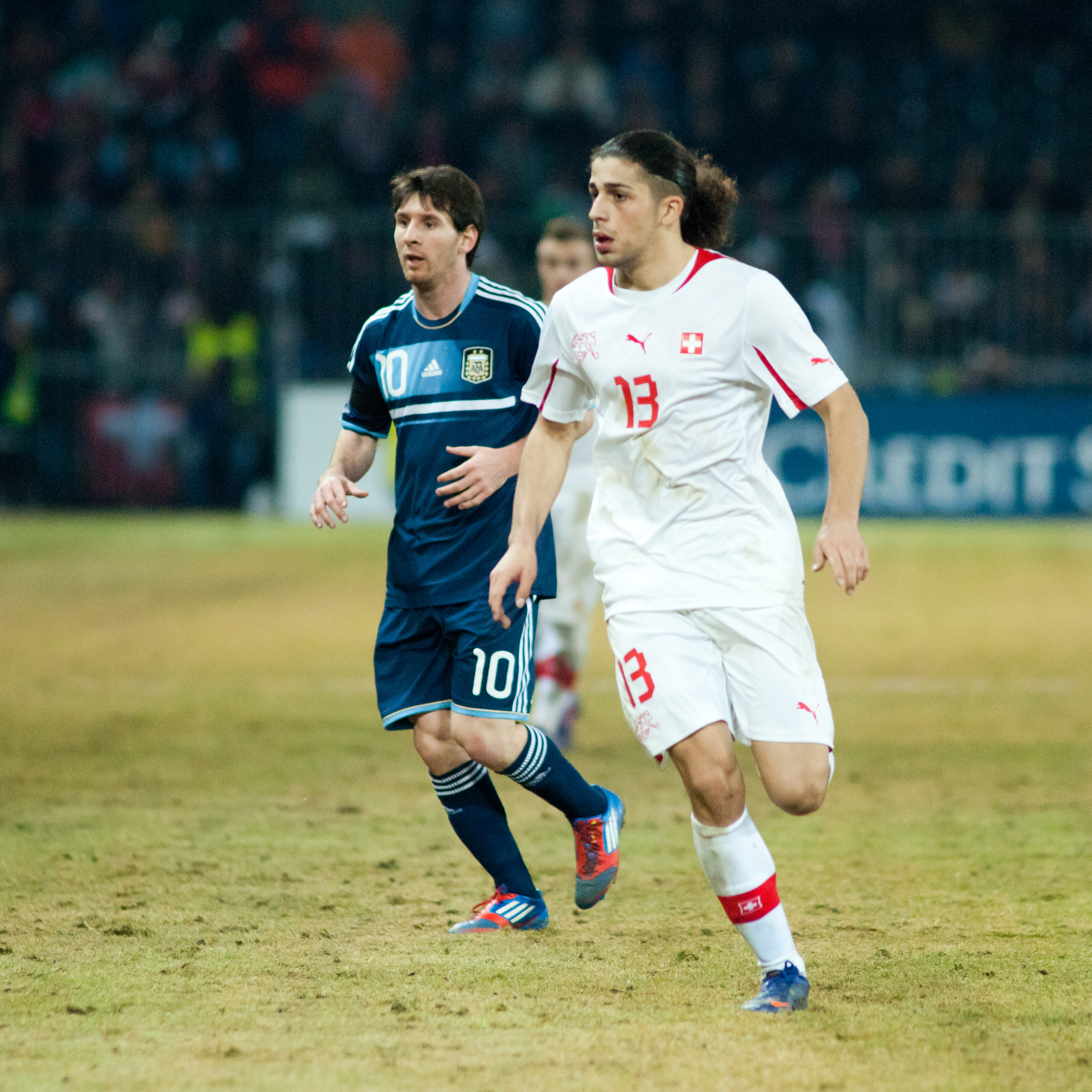
Rodriguez marking Argentina's Lionel Messi in a friendly in 2012

In 2009, he was part of the Swiss U17 team who won the 2009 FIFA U-17 World Cup. His first goal of the tournament came in Switzerland's second group game against Japan on 27 October 2009, netting the winning goal as the match ended 4–3. He opened the scoring for the Swiss in the 35th minute against Germany in the Round of 16 as Switzerland eventually won 4–3 in added extra time. In the semi-finals against Colombia, he scored Switzerland's final goal of their 4–0 win to reach their first final of a FIFA competition since a 3–0 loss to Uruguay in the 1924 Olympics. He played the entire final against Nigeria on 15 November, helping Switzerland to a 1–0 victory to become just the third European nation to lift the trophy.

Rodriguez made his debut for the Swiss senior national team in a Euro 2012 qualifying match against Wales on 7 October 2011, replacing Xherdan Shaqiri in the second half of the 0–2 loss. In his full debt four days later, Rodriguez played the entire match as the Swiss defeated Montenegro 2–0 to end their qualification campaign on a high, despite missing out on a playoff spot to the Balkan side. In a friendly match against the Netherlands on 11 November 2011, he played the entire match as the Swiss kept a clean sheet in Amsterdam.

He played all three matches for Switzerland at the 2012 Olympics, in which they were eliminated in the group stage.

Rodriguez featured in nine of ten World Cup qualifying matches for the Swiss, totaling 810 minutes, as they qualified for the World Cup with a game to spare, thanks to a 2–1 win over Albania on 11 October 2013. On 13 May 2014, Rodriguez was named in Switzerland's squad for the 2014 FIFA World Cup. In their opening group game against Ecuador on 15 June, he took the corner which was headed by Admir Mehmedi for the equaliser, as well as crossing for Haris Seferovic to score the winner in a 2–1 victory. During the tournament finals in Brazil, he averaged 5 tackles and 2.5 interceptions per game, earning plaudits for his strong tackling as well as his ability to read the game.

At UEFA Euro 2016 in France, Rodriguez played every minute as Switzerland reached the last 16. They were eliminated on penalties by Poland in Saint-Étienne, although Rodriguez scored his attempt.

On 8 October 2016, he scored his first international goal on his 43rd cap, putting the Swiss into the lead in a 2018 FIFA World Cup qualifying win over Hungary at the Groupama Arena. He netted another penalty on 3 September 2017 to conclude a 3–0 away win over Latvia. The Swiss finished second in their group behind Portugal, qualifying for the play-offs where they faced Northern Ireland. Rodriguez scored the only goal of the tie in the first leg at Windsor Park in Belfast, when a penalty was controversially awarded against Corry Evans. In the second leg in Basel, he made a goalline clearance from a Jonny Evans header to ensure the Swiss victory.

He was included in Switzerland's 23-man squad for the 2018 FIFA World Cup. He started at left-back in all three of the team's Group E matches, as well as the round of 16 loss to Sweden.

In May 2019, he played for 2019 UEFA Nations League Finals. In the first match he scored a penalty against Portugal, but it did not help the team win, Switzerland lost 3–1. Four days later, Rodriguez played 87 minutes in the third-place play-off, as Swiss drew 0–0 with England and lost 6–5 in the penalty shootout.

In June 2021, Rodriguez was included in the 26-man Swiss squad for the postponed UEFA Euro 2020, where he started in all five matches for the Nati. On 28 June 2021, in the round of 16 match against France, Rodriguez had a 55th minute penalty kick saved by Hugo Lloris. The game ended in a 3–3 draw, with Switzerland winning the penalty shootout 5–4 to qualify for the quarter-finals, where they lost to Spain.

On 27 September 2022, Rodriguez played his 100th match for Switzerland in the Nations League game against Czech Republic.

Rodriguez was a member of the Swiss squad for the 2022 FIFA World Cup in Qatar, playing in all four of the team's matches as they reached the round of 16, losing 6–1 to Portugal.

On 15 June 2024, Rodriguez started in Switzerland's opening match of UEFA Euro 2024, where they beat Hungary 3–1. This was his 22nd appearance at a major international tournament, setting a new record for the Swiss national team.

On 20 May 2026, Rodriguez was selected in the 26-man squad for the 2026 FIFA World Cup. He made his 13th World Cup appearance for Switzerland in the opening 1–1 draw against Qatar, becoming his country's joint-record appearance holder in the competition, alongside his teammate Granit Xhaka.

== Style of play ==
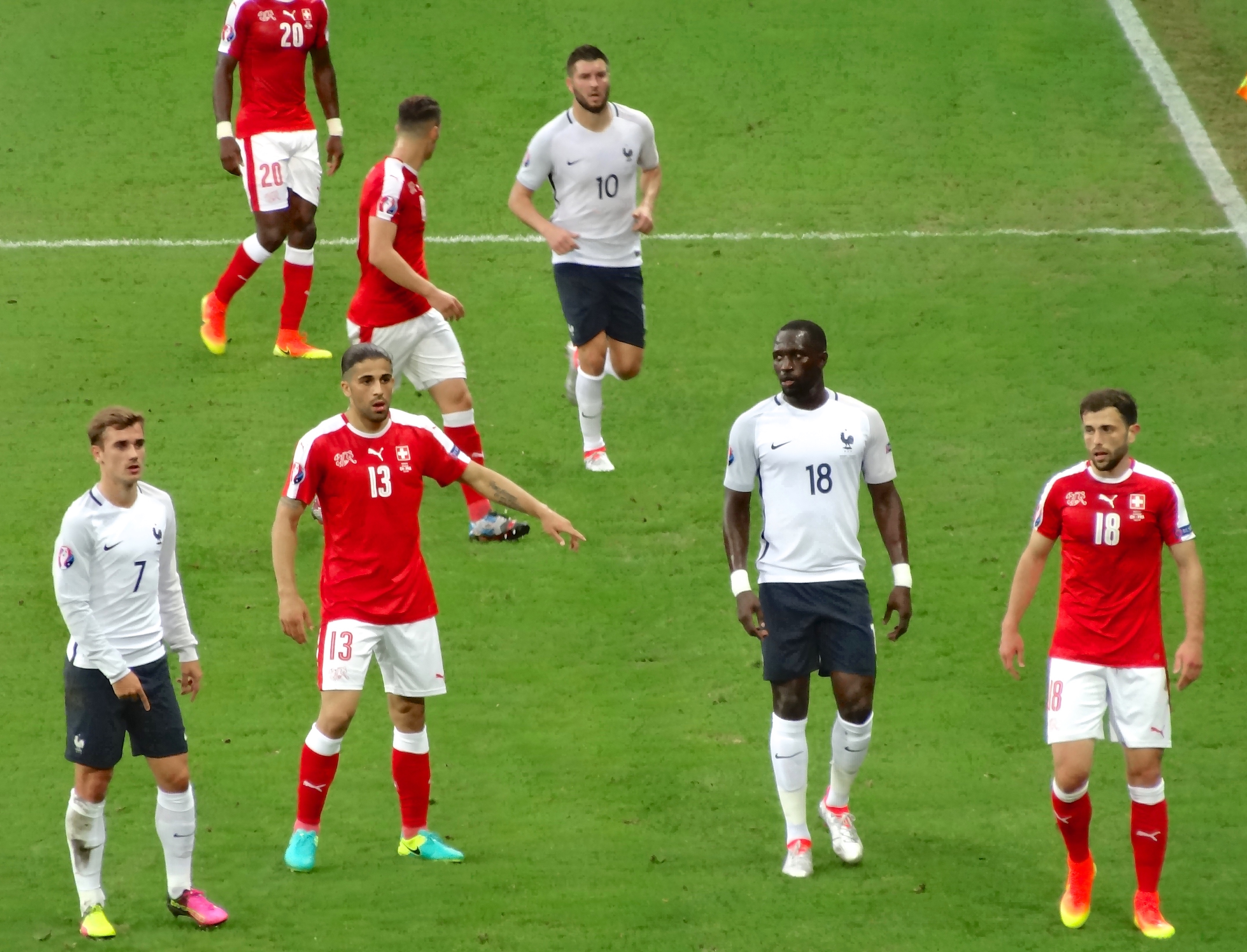
Rodriguez (red, number 13) defending against France at Euro 2016

Due to his wide range of skills, Rodriguez is known for being equally adept at defending as he is going forward. Although usually a left-back, his size and physique have also seen him be deployed as a centre-back on occasion. Experts consider him an accomplished defender and note his strong heading ability, as well as his personality. He is also considered a continual attacking threat, and has been noted by analysts for his exceptional stamina and pace, which allow for his constant, buccaneering runs up the wing; he has also drawn praise from pundits for rarely conceding careless fouls. Conversely, he has been criticised for giving too much room to opposition attackers, taking up poor positioning and lacking in defensive discipline, while other analysts have criticised his concentration.

Possessing good technique and distribution, he has become known for his pinpoint crossing and accurate left foot, which have earned him comparisons with Everton and England left back Leighton Baines. He is also noted for his speciality in dead ball situations, such as corner kicks, direct free kicks, and indirect free kicks, as well as for his excellent penalty taking abilities, emerging as Wolfsburg's first-choice penalty taker during the 2013–14 season. In 2014, his manager Dieter Hecking praised Rodriguez as "the best left-back in the Bundesliga".

== Personal life ==
Rodriguez was born in Zürich to a Spanish father and a Chilean mother. His mother, Marcela Araya, died of cancer in 2015. Rodriguez had the number 68, the year of her birth, tattooed on his back, and chose it as his shirt number at AC Milan. Rodriguez was born with a diaphragmatic hernia, meaning that his stomach, spleen, liver and intestine had migrated into the chest. Rodriguez was given a 50% chance of survival and was monitored every six months for the first three years of his life. He is the younger brother of midfielder Roberto Rodríguez and the older brother of midfielder Francisco Rodríguez.

== Career statistics ==
=== Club ===
As of match played 23 May 2026

Appearances and goals by club, season and competition
Club	Season	League			National cup (Note: Includes Swiss Cup, DFB-Pokal, Coppa Italia, Copa del Rey)		Europe		Other		Total	
Club	Season	Division	Apps	Goals	Apps	Goals	Apps	Goals	Apps	Goals	Apps	Goals
Zürich	2009–10	Swiss Super League	6	0	0	0	0	0	—		6	0
Zürich	2010–11	Swiss Super League	13	1	1	0	0	0	—		14	1
Zürich	2011–12	Swiss Super League	16	1	1	0	9	0	—		26	1
Zürich	Total		35	2	2	0	9	0	—		46	2
VfL Wolfsburg	2011–12	Bundesliga	17	0	0	0	—		—		17	0
VfL Wolfsburg	2012–13	Bundesliga	24	0	3	0	—		–		27	0
VfL Wolfsburg	2013–14	Bundesliga	34	5	4	2	—		—		38	7
VfL Wolfsburg	2014–15	Bundesliga	26	6	4	1	9 (Note: Appearances in UEFA Europa League)	3	—		39	10
VfL Wolfsburg	2015–16	Bundesliga	24	2	2	0	9 (Note: Appearances in UEFA Champions League)	1	1 (Note: Appearance in DFL-Supercup)	0	36	3
VfL Wolfsburg	2016–17	Bundesliga	24	2	3	0	—		0	0	27	2
VfL Wolfsburg	Total		149	15	16	3	18	4	1	0	184	22
AC Milan	2017–18	Serie A	34	1	4	0	9	3	—		47	4
AC Milan	2018–19	Serie A	35	0	2	0	3	0	1 (Note: Appearance in Supercoppa Italiana)	0	41	0
AC Milan	2019–20	Serie A	5	0	0	0	—		—		5	0
AC Milan	Total		74	1	6	0	12	3	1	0	93	4
PSV (loan)	2019–20	Eredivisie	6	0	—		—		—		6	0
Torino	2020–21	Serie A	16	0	2	0	—		—		18	0
Torino	2021–22	Serie A	34	0	2	0	—		—		36	0
Torino	2022–23	Serie A	35	0	3	0	—		—		38	0
Torino	2023–24	Serie A	35	1	2	0	—		—		37	1
Torino	Total		120	1	9	0	—		—		129	1
Betis	2024–25	La Liga	18	0	3	0	12 (Note: Appearances in UEFA Conference League)	0	—		33	0
Betis	2025–26	La Liga	23	0	3	0	9	0	—		35	0
Betis	Total		41	0	6	0	21	0	—		68	0
Career total			425	19	39	3	60	7	2	0	536	29

=== International ===
As of match played 16 November 2026

Appearances and goals by national team and year
National team	Year	Apps	Goals
Switzerland	2011	4	0
Switzerland	2012	7	0
Switzerland	2013	7	0
Switzerland	2014	10	0
Switzerland	2015	5	0
Switzerland	2016	12	1
Switzerland	2017	5	2
Switzerland	2018	11	3
Switzerland	2019	10	2
Switzerland	2020	6	0
Switzerland	2021	15	1
Switzerland	2022	12	0
Switzerland	2023	9	0
Switzerland	2024	11	0
Switzerland	2025	10	0
Switzerland	2026	15	1
Total		150	10

Scores and results list Switzerland's goal tally first, score column indicates score after each Rodriguez goal.

List of international goals scored by Ricardo Rodriguez
No.	Date	Venue	Opponent	Score	Result	Competition
1	7 October 2016	Groupama Arena, Budapest, Hungary	Hungary	2–1	3–2	2018 FIFA World Cup qualification
2	3 September 2017	Skonto Stadium, Riga, Latvia	Latvia	3–0	3–0	2018 FIFA World Cup qualification
3	9 November 2017	Windsor Park, Belfast, Northern Ireland	Northern Ireland	1–0	1–0	2018 FIFA World Cup qualification
4	3 June 2018	Estadio de la Cerámica, Villarreal, Spain	Spain	1–1	1–1	Friendly
5	8 June 2018	Cornaredo Stadium, Lugano, Switzerland	Japan	1–0	2–0	Friendly
6	18 November 2018	Swissporarena, Lucerne, Switzerland	Belgium	1–2	5–2	2018–19 UEFA Nations League A
7	5 June 2019	Estádio do Dragão, Porto, Portugal	Portugal	1–1	1–3	2019 UEFA Nations League Finals
8	8 September 2019	Stade Tourbillon, Sion, Switzerland	Gibraltar	3–0	4–0	UEFA Euro 2020 qualification
9	30 May 2021	Kybunpark, St. Gallen, Switzerland	United States	1–1	2–1	Friendly
10	29 September 2026	Hampden Park, Glasgow, Scotland	Scotland	1–0	3–0	2026–27 UEFA Nations League B

== Honours ==
VfL Wolfsburg

- DFB-Pokal: 2014–15
- DFL-Supercup: 2015

Betis

- UEFA Conference League runner-up: 2024–25

Switzerland U17

- FIFA U-17 World Cup: 2009

Individual

- FC Zürich Fans' Player of the Season: 2011–12
- Swiss Footballer of the Year: 2014

== See also ==
- List of men's footballers with 100 or more international caps
