= Junior Malanda =

Belgian footballer (1994–2015)

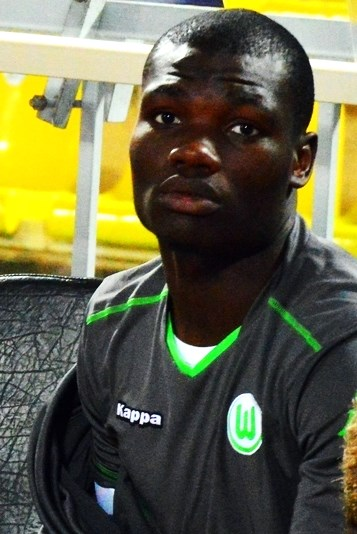
- Malanda with VfL Wolfsburg in 2014

Personal information
- Full name: Bernard Malanda-Adje
- Date of birth: 28 August 1994
- Place of birth: Brussels, Belgium
- Date of death: 10 January 2015 (aged 20)
- Place of death: Porta Westfalica, Germany
- Height: 1.81 m (5 ft 11 in)
- Position: Defensive midfielder

Youth career
- 2000–2001: VK Sint-Agatha-Berchem
- 2001–2003: FC Ganshoren
- 2003–2004: RSCUP Dieleghem Jette
- 2004–2005: Brussels
- 2005–2007: Anderlecht
- 2007–2012: Lille

Senior career*
Years	Team	Apps	(Gls)
2011–2012	Lille II	17	(1)
2012–2013	Zulte Waregem	35	(3)
2013–2015	VfL Wolfsburg	17	(2)
2013	→ Zulte Waregem (loan)	17	(3)
Total		86	(9)

International career
2009	Belgium U15	8	(0)
2009–2010	Belgium U16	10	(0)
2010–2011	Belgium U17	9	(0)
2011–2012	Belgium U18	4	(0)
2012	Belgium U19	7	(0)
2013–2014	Belgium U21	15	(2)
- * Club domestic league appearances and goals

Bernard Malanda-Adje (28 August 1994 – 10 January 2015) known as his nickname Junior Malanda, was a Belgian professional footballer who played for German club VfL Wolfsburg as a defensive midfielder.

He was a youth team player at Brussels, Anderlecht and Lille, going on to play in the reserve team of the latter. In 2012, he joined Zulte Waregem, and was a regular player as they finished runners-up of the 2012–13 Belgian Pro League. After that he was signed by Wolfsburg of the Bundesliga on a five-year contract, loaning him back for the first season before recalling him. He also represented Belgium up to under-21 level.

Malanda died at the age of 20, when a car in which he was travelling crashed in northern Germany, killing him instantly. The crash was attributed to excessive speed and wet conditions. Over 1,000 mourners attended his funeral at the Basilica of the Sacred Heart in his native Brussels.

== Club career ==
=== Early career ===
Formerly of the youth teams of the Belgian clubs RWDM Brussels FC and R.S.C. Anderlecht, Malanda joined French Ligue 1 club Lille OSC in 2007. He spent the 2010–11 season with their reserves in the Championnat de France amateur, the fourth tier of football in the country. He made his debut on 9 October 2011, playing the entirety of a 1–0 win away to Drancy. Malanda made 17 league appearances that season, scoring a solitary goal, an 88th-minute equaliser in a 1–1 home draw against Poissy on 20 May 2012.

=== Zulte Waregem ===
On 7 July 2012, 17-year-old Malanda returned to Belgium, signing a three-year deal with Zulte Waregem, with the option of an additional two. He made his debut in the Belgian Pro League on 5 August, replacing Hernán Hinostroza in the 57th minute of a 3–1 win against Gent at the Regenboogstadion. Malanda played 36 league matches as his team finished as runners-up to Anderlecht, scoring 3 goals, starting with an equaliser on 16 December as Zulte Waregem came from a goal down to defeat Genk in a home fixture. He also scored the decisive goal on 21 April 2013, when his team defeated the eventual champions 2–1.

On 1 August 2013, VfL Wolfsburg signed Malanda on a five-year deal, with him being loaned back to Zulte Waregem for the rest of the season. Six days later, he made his debut in a European competition, featuring in a 0–3 home defeat against Dutch club PSV Eindhoven which saw Zulte Waregem eliminated from the UEFA Champions League. Malanda played 8 matches in the club's UEFA Europa League campaign, and scored twice: opening a 1–1 draw against APOEL Nicosia in the play-offs, and netting an 88th-minute winner in a 2–1 group stage triumph away to Wigan Athletic on 28 November 2013.

=== VfL Wolfsburg ===
Malanda was recalled by Wolfsburg manager Dieter Hecking on 1 January 2014. On the 25 January, he was included in a Wolfsburg matchday squad for the first time, an unused substitute in a 1–3 home defeat against Hannover 96. He made his debut on 8 February, replacing Christian Träsch for the last 8 minutes of a 3–0 home win against Mainz 05.

On 25 March, he scored his first goal for the club, opening a 3–1 win at Werder Bremen in the second minute. He added a second on 12 April, finishing off a 4–1 win against 1. FC Nürnberg. However, an injury then put Malanda out for the remainder of the 2013–14 season.

== International career ==
While aged 17, Malanda captained the Belgium national under-19 football team.

== Style of play ==
Earlier in his career, Malanda played as a right back before establishing himself as a defensive midfielder.

== Personal life ==
Malanda was from a Belgian family of Congolese descent, and was survived by his brother named Rudy. He was a close friend of Kevin De Bruyne and Ivan Perišić, teammates at Wolfsburg.

== Death ==
=== Crash and funeral ===
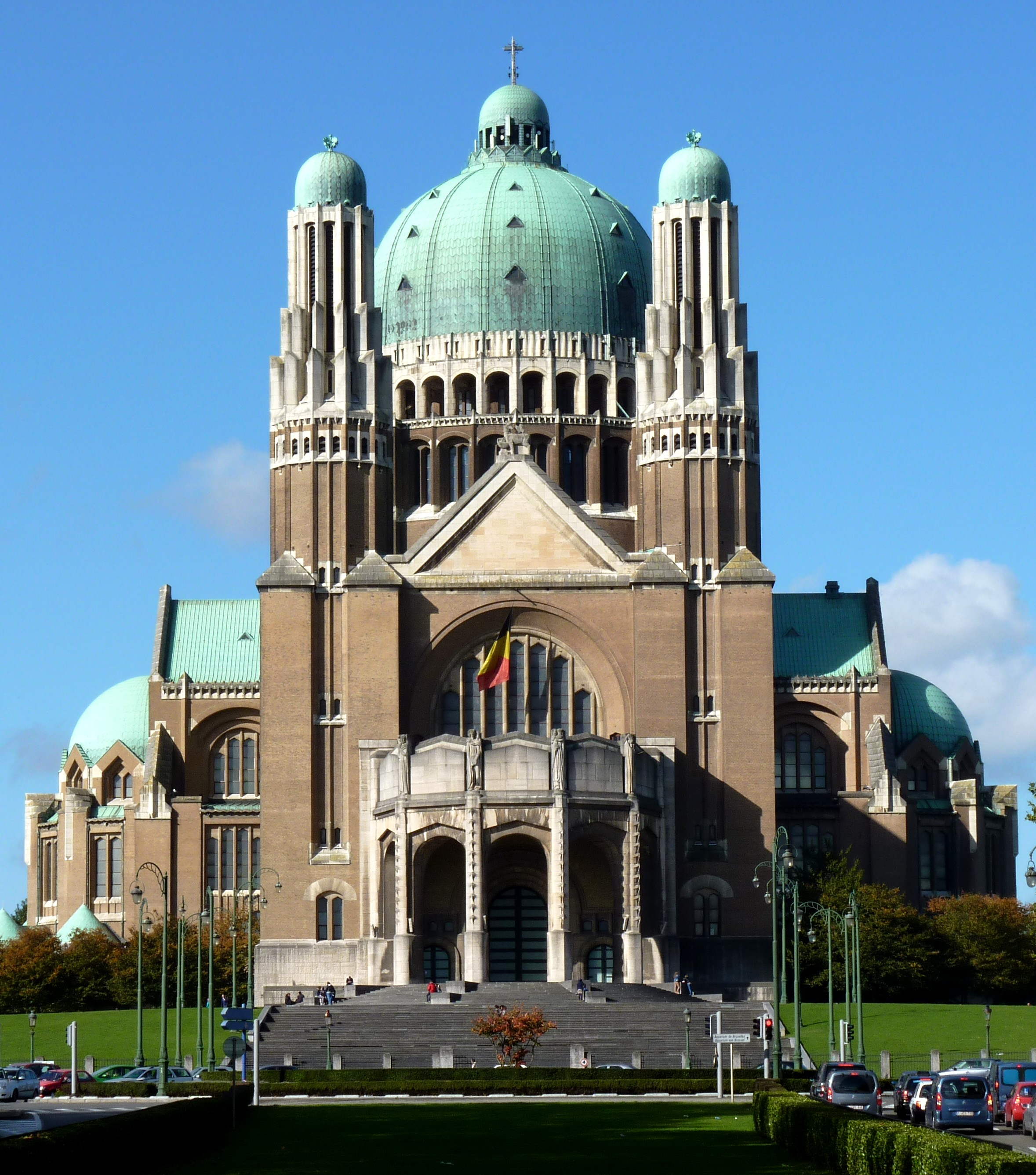
Over 1,000 mourners attended Malanda's funeral at the Basilica of the Sacred Heart, Brussels

On 10 January 2015, at 15:25 local time (CET), Malanda was travelling in the back seat of a Volkswagen Touareg, on the A2 near the town of Porta Westfalica in northern Germany, to catch a flight to a training camp in South Africa. Apparently without outside influence, the car cleared the guardrail on the side of the road and crashed into a tree and overturned multiple times, Malanda was catapulted from the back seat of the car. The police confirmed Malanda was not wearing his seat-belt at the time of the crash, resulting in him being thrown forward at the collision and being killed instantly, Malanda was pronounced dead at the scene at 4:00 PM.

According to the police report, the crash was caused due to inappropriate speed for the very rainy weather, and an investigation into possible manslaughter was opened. His agent Peter Smeets stated Malanda's car was caught speeding 21 times in the last 6 months, of which it was faster than 200 km/h in ten instances. He reported that Malanda was almost never driving the car himself. The road was blocked for two hours to clear the scene after the crash.

Malanda's funeral was held on 20 January at the Basilica of the Sacred Heart, Brussels. It drew over 1,000 mourners, among them Wolfsburg manager Dieter Hecking and Sporting Director Klaus Allofs as well as Marc Wilmots, the former manager of the Belgium national football team. Songs and dances from his family's ancestral Congo were performed. After the funeral his body was buried in Berchem-Sainte-Agathe, Brussels, where he grew up.

=== Reactions ===
Notable footballers including Thibaut Courtois, Ivan Perišić, Nicklas Bendtner, Benedikt Höwedes, Kevin De Bruyne, Mario Götze, and others, paid tribute to him on social media. Fellow Belgian Romelu Lukaku dedicated his next goal to him after scoring for Everton in the FA Cup on 13 January. Bundesliga club Bayern Munich observed a minute's silence for Malanda at their training camp in Qatar.

Fans marched outside the Volkswagen Arena in tribute to Malanda in Wolfsburg, Wolfsburg played its first match since his death, against Bayern Munich on 30 January, a giant banner with Malanda's name and image was displayed by fans at the stadium.

At the end of his final season, Wolfsburg reached the 2015 DFB-Pokal final against Borussia Dortmund, where they wore shirts with his squad number 19 within a heart. They subsequently retired his number for the upcoming season.

== Career statistics ==
As of 20 December 2014 .

Appearances and goals by club, season and competitions.

Club	Season	League			National Cup (Note: Includes Belgian Cup & DFB-Pokal)		Europe		Total	
Club	Season	Division	Apps	Goals	Apps	Goals	Apps	Goals	Apps	Goals
Lille II	2011−12	Championnat de France amateur	17	1	−		−		17	1
Zulte Waregem	2012–13	Belgian Pro League	35	3	4	0	−		39	3
Zulte Waregem	Total		35	3	4	0	0	0	56	3
VfL Wolfsburg	2013−14	Bundesliga	7	2	1	0	−		8	2
VfL Wolfsburg	2014–15	Bundesliga	10	0	2	0	3 (Note: Appearances in UEFA Europa League)	0	15	0
VfL Wolfsburg	Total		17	2	2	0	3	0	22	2
Zulte Waregem (loan)	2013–14	Belgian Pro League	17	3	1	0	9 (Note: One appearance in the UEFA Champions League and eight appearances and one goal in the UEFA Europa League)	1	17	3
Career total			86	9	8	0	12	1	96	9

== Honours ==
VfL Wolfsburg

- DFB-Pokal: 2014–15 (posthumous)
