= 2011–12 VfL Wolfsburg season =

VfL Wolfsburg
2011–12 season
- Manager: Felix Magath
- Stadium: Volkswagen Arena
- Bundesliga: 8th
- DFB Pokal: First round
Home colours	Away colours	Third colours

The 2011–12 season was the 67th season in VfL Wolfsburg's football history.

== Season summary ==
Wolfsburg finished 8th in the Bundesliga, rising from 15th the previous season, but were knocked out in the first round of the DFB Pokal.

== Players ==
=== First-team squad ===
Squad at end of season

Note: Flags indicate national team as defined under FIFA eligibility rules; some limited exceptions apply. Players may hold more than one non-FIFA nationality.

No.	Pos.	Nation	Player
1	GK	SUI	Diego Benaglio
2	DF	GER	Patrick Ochs
3	DF	BRA	Felipe Lopes
4	DF	GER	Marcel Schäfer
6	DF	SRB	Slobodan Medojević
7	MF	BRA	Josué
8	MF	POR	Vieirinha
10	MF	GER	Thomas Hitzlsperger
11	MF	BIH	Hasan Salihamidžić
12	GK	GER	André Lenz
13	MF	JPN	Makoto Hasebe
15	MF	GER	Christian Träsch
17	DF	GER	Alexander Madlung
18	FW	CRO	Mario Mandžukić
19	FW	SWE	Rasmus Jönsson
20	MF	CZE	Petr Jiráček
21	FW	GER	Kevin Scheidhauer
22	MF	POL	Mateusz Klich
23	DF	GER	Marco Russ

No.	Pos.	Nation	Player
24	FW	IRI	Ashkan Dejagah
25	DF	BRA	Chris
26	DF	CRO	Hrvoje Čale
27	MF	GER	Maximilian Arnold
28	MF	BRA	Diego
28	MF	CIV	Ibrahim Sissoko
29	MF	CZE	Jan Polák
30	MF	VEN	Yohandry Orozco
31	DF	GER	Robin Knoche
32	MF	GER	Sebastian Schindzielorz
33	FW	GER	Patrick Helmes
34	DF	SUI	Ricardo Rodríguez
35	GK	SUI	Marwin Hitz
36	DF	GER	Bjarne Thoelke
37	MF	MKD	Ferhan Hasani
39	DF	GER	Michael Schulze
40	FW	GER	Sebastian Polter
44	FW	CIV	Giovanni Sio

=== Left club during season ===
Note: Flags indicate national team as defined under FIFA eligibility rules; some limited exceptions apply. Players may hold more than one non-FIFA nationality.

No.	Pos.	Nation	Player
3	DF	GER	Arne Friedrich (released)
5	MF	KOR	Koo Ja-cheol (on loan to FC Augsburg)
6	MF	TUR	Tuncay Şanlı (on loan to Bolton Wanderers)
6	MF	BLR	Alexander Hleb (on loan from Barcelona)
8	MF	DEN	Thomas Kahlenberg (on loan to Evian)

No.	Pos.	Nation	Player
9	FW	CRO	Srđan Lakić (on loan to 1899 Hoffenheim)
14	MF	TUR	Tolga Ciğerci (on loan to Borussia Monchengladbach)
16	DF	GRE	Sotirios Kyrgiakos (on loan to Sunderland)
19	DF	SVK	Peter Pekarík (on loan to Kayserispor)
34	DF	DEN	Simon Kjær (on loan to Roma)
