= Christian Träsch =

German footballer

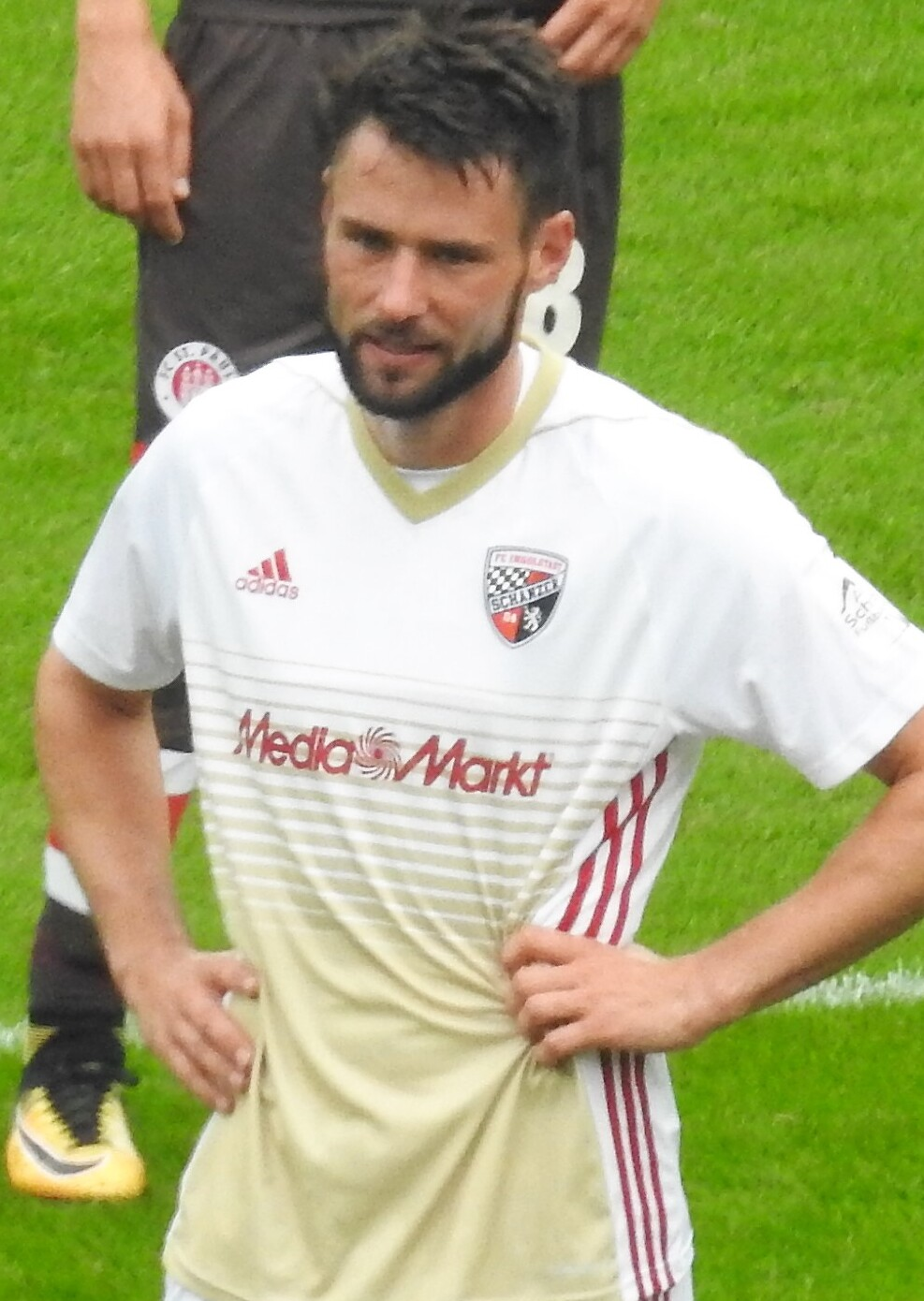
- Träsch with FC Ingolstadt 04 in 2017

Personal information
- Date of birth: 1 September 1987 (age 39)
- Place of birth: Ingolstadt, West Germany
- Height: 1.80 m (5 ft 11 in)
- Positions: Right-back; defensive midfielder

Youth career
- 1992–2000: TV 1861 Ingolstadt
- 2000–2003: MTV Ingolstadt
- 2003–2006: 1860 Munich

Senior career*
Years	Team	Apps	(Gls)
2006–2007	1860 Munich II	39	(2)
2007–2008	VfB Stuttgart II	39	(1)
2008–2011	VfB Stuttgart	83	(5)
2011–2017	VfL Wolfsburg	124	(0)
2014	VfL Wolfsburg II	1	(1)
2017–2019	FC Ingolstadt	35	(1)
2020	Al-Wasl	1	(0)
Total		322	(10)

International career
2009–2011	Germany	10	(0)
- * Club domestic league appearances and goals

Christian Träsch (born 1 September 1987) is a German former professional footballer who played as a right-back or defensive midfielder.

== Club career ==
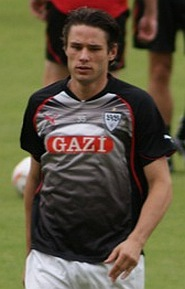
Träsch with VfB Stuttgart in 2010

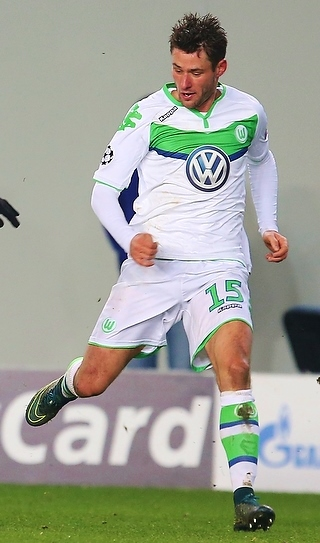
Träsch with VfL Wolfsburg in 2015

Träsch made his professional debut as a player of VfB Stuttgart on 3 February 2008 against Schalke 04. He scored his first goal for the team on 5 October 2008 against Werder Bremen from a 25-meter volley. On 21 January 2009, he extended his contract with Stuttgart until the summer of 2012.

On 25 July 2011, Träsch moved to VfL Wolfsburg. On 25 October 2014, he played 89 minutes in a reserve team match where he scored a 10th-minute goal. On 30 May 2015, he played as Wolfsburg won the German Cup for the first time defeating Borussia Dortmund 3–1 at the Olympic Stadium, Berlin.

Träsch announced his retirement from playing in October 2020, aged 33. He appeared in over 240 matches in the top two divisions of German football.

== International career ==
Träsch was nominated to the senior Germany squad on 19 May 2009 for a tour of Asia. He made his debut on this tour in a match against United Arab Emirates on 2 June. He was substituted on in the 79th minute for Andreas Hinkel. His tenth and last international match was a 3–3 between Ukraine and Germany on 11 November 2011 in Kyiv.

== Career statistics ==
Appearances and goals by club, season and competition
Club	Season	League			Cup		Continental		Other		Total		Ref.
Club	Season	League	Apps	Goals	Apps	Goals	Apps	Goals	Apps	Goals	Apps	Goals	Ref.
1860 Munich II	2005–06	Regionalliga Süd	15	2	—		—		—		15	2	
1860 Munich II	2006–07	Regionalliga Süd	24	0	—		—		—		24	0	
1860 Munich II	Total		39	2	0	0	0	0	0	0	39	2	—
VfB Stuttgart II	2007–08	Regionalliga Süd	32	0	—		—		—		32	0	
VfB Stuttgart II	2008–09	3. Liga	7	1	—		—		—		7	1	
VfB Stuttgart II	Total		39	1	0	0	0	0	0	0	39	1	—
VfB Stuttgart	2007–08	Bundesliga	1	0	0	0	0	0	—		1	0	
VfB Stuttgart	2008–09	Bundesliga	19	1	0	0	5	0	—		24	1	
VfB Stuttgart	2009–10	Bundesliga	29	3	3	0	6	1	—		38	4	
VfB Stuttgart	2010–11	Bundesliga	34	1	3	0	8	0	—		45	1	
VfB Stuttgart	Total		83	5	6	0	19	1	0	0	108	6	—
VfL Wolfsburg	2011–12	Bundesliga	33	0	1	0	—		—		34	0	
VfL Wolfsburg	2012–13	Bundesliga	17	0	4	1	—		—		21	1	
VfL Wolfsburg	2013–14	Bundesliga	22	0	4	0	—		—		26	0	
VfL Wolfsburg	2014–15	Bundesliga	12	0	3	0	6	0	—		21	0	
VfL Wolfsburg	2015–16	Bundesliga	29	0	1	0	8	0	—		37	0	
VfL Wolfsburg	2016–17	Bundesliga	11	0	1	0	—		2 (Note: Appearances in Bundesliga relegation play-off matches)	0	14	0	
VfL Wolfsburg	Total		124	0	14	1	14	0	2	0	154	1	—
VfL Wolfsburg II	2014–15	Regionalliga Nord	1	1	—		—		—		1	1	
FC Ingolstadt 04	2017–18	2. Bundesliga	24	1	2	0	—		—		26	1	
FC Ingolstadt 04	2018–19	2. Bundesliga	11	0	0	0	—		—		11	0	
FC Ingolstadt 04	Total		35	1	2	0	0	0	0	0	37	1	—
Al-Wasl	2019–20	UAE Pro League	1	0	1	0	—		—		2	0	
Career total			322	10	23	1	33	1	2	0	380	12	—

== Honours ==
1860 Munich

- Under 17 Bundesliga: 2005–06

VfL Wolfsburg

- DFB-Pokal: 2014–15
- DFL-Supercup: 2015
