= 2015–16 VfL Wolfsburg season =

VfL Wolfsburg
2015–16 season
- Manager: Dieter Hecking
- Stadium: Volkswagen Arena
- Bundesliga: 8th
- DFB-Pokal: Round 2
- DFL-Supercup: Winners
- UEFA Champions League: Quarter-finals
- Top goalscorer: League: Bas Dost (8); All: Bas Dost (10)
Home colours	Away colours	Third colours

The 2015–16 VfL Wolfsburg season was the 71st season in the club's football history. In the previous season, Wolfsburg had finished in second place and qualified for the UEFA Champions League. Additionally, they won their first DFB-Pokal trophy in the club's history, defeating Borussia Dortmund in the final.

They opened their season by winning their first DFL-Supercup in the club's history by defeating Bayern Munich in the 2015 final on penalties following a 1–1 draw after 90 minutes.

== Players ==
As of 30 August 2015

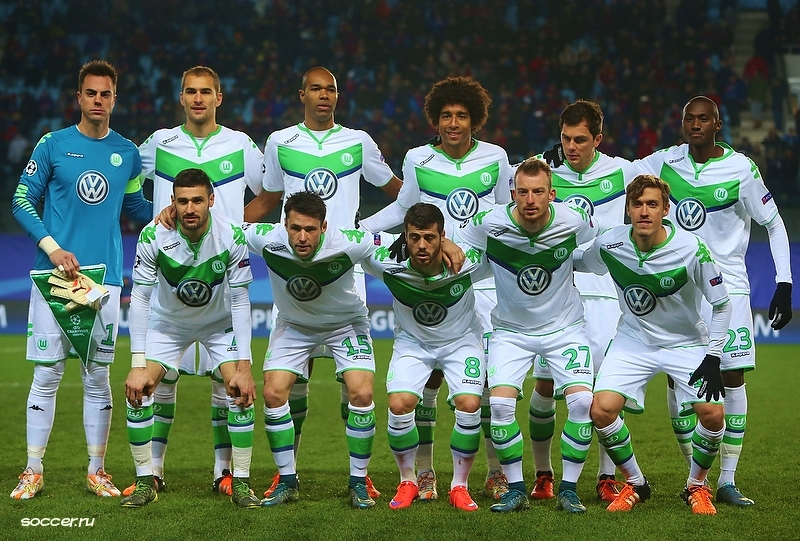
Wolfsburg prior to its Champions League match against CSKA Moscow on 25 November 2015.

Note: Flags indicate national team as defined under FIFA eligibility rules; some limited exceptions apply. Players may hold more than one non-FIFA nationality.

No.	Pos.	Nation	Player
1	GK	SUI	Diego Benaglio (captain)
3	FW	DEN	Nicklas Bendtner
4	DF	GER	Marcel Schäfer
5	DF	SUI	Timm Klose
6	DF	PER	Carlos Ascues
7	MF	ITA	Daniel Caligiuri
8	MF	POR	Vieirinha
10	MF	GER	Julian Draxler
11	FW	GER	Max Kruse
12	FW	NED	Bas Dost
15	DF	GER	Christian Träsch
17	MF	GER	André Schürrle
18	DF	BRA	Dante
20	GK	GER	Max Grün

No.	Pos.	Nation	Player
22	MF	BRA	Luiz Gustavo
23	MF	FRA	Josuha Guilavogui (on loan from Atlético Madrid)
24	DF	GER	Sebastian Jung
25	DF	BRA	Naldo
26	DF	BRA	Felipe
27	MF	GER	Maximilian Arnold
28	GK	BEL	Koen Casteels
30	MF	GER	Paul Seguin
31	DF	GER	Robin Knoche
32	FW	POL	Oskar Zawada
33	FW	GER	Sebastian Stolze
34	DF	SUI	Ricardo Rodríguez
35	MF	SUI	Francisco Rodríguez
37	DF	GER	Moritz Sprenger

== Transfers ==
=== In ===
No.	Pos.	Nat.	Name	Age	EU	Moving from	Type	Transfer window	Ends	Transfer fee	Source
6	DF	(Peru)	Carlos Ascues	23	Non-EU	(Peru) Melgar	Transfer	Summer	2018	€1.5m	
10	MF	(Germany)	Julian Draxler	21	EU	(Germany) Schalke 04	Transfer	Summer	2020	€36m	
11	FW	(Germany)	Max Kruse	27	EU	(Germany) Borussia Mönchengladbach	Transfer	Summer	2019	€12m	
18	DF	(Brazil)	Dante	31	Non-EU	(Germany) Bayern Munich	Transfer	Summer	2018	€4.5m	
28	GK	(Belgium)	Koen Casteels	23	EU	(Germany) Werder Bremen	Loan return	Summer			
35	MF	(Switzerland)	Francisco Rodríguez	20	EU	(Switzerland) Zürich	Transfer	Summer	2018		
38	MF	(Belgium)	Ismail Azzaoui	17	EU	(England) Tottenham Hotspur	Transfer	Summer			

=== Out ===
No.	Pos.	Nat.	Name	Age	EU	Moving to	Type	Transfer window	Transfer fee	Source
9	LW	(Croatia)	Ivan Perišić	26	EU	(Italy) Internazionale	Transfer	Summer	€18m	
10	MF	(Germany)	Aaron Hunt	28	EU	(Germany) Hamburger SV	Transfer	Summer	€3m	
14	MF	(Belgium)	Kevin De Bruyne	24	EU	(England) Manchester City	Transfer	Summer	€75m	
3	FW	(Denmark)	Nicklas Bendtner	28	EU	Unattached	Contract terminated	Winter	N/A	

== Competitions ==
Win Draw Loss

=== DFL-Supercup ===
1 August 2015 Final	VfL Wolfsburg	1–1 (5–4 p)	Bayern Munich	Wolfsburg
20:30 CEST (UTC+02:00)	Guilavogui (yellow card) 35'; Naldo (yellow card) 71'; Perišić (yellow card) 77'; Bendtner 89'	Report	Douglas Costa (yellow card) 21'; Robben 49'; Vidal (yellow card) 82'	Stadium: Volkswagen Arena; Attendance: 30,000; Referee: Marco Fritz
	Penalties
	R. Rodríguez (penalty scored); De Bruyne (penalty scored); Schürrle (penalty scored); Kruse (penalty scored); Bendtner (penalty scored)		(penalty scored) Vidal; (penalty missed) Alonso; (penalty scored) Robben; (penalty scored) Lahm; (penalty scored) Douglas Costa

=== Bundesliga ===
==== League table ====
Pos	Team	Pld	W	D	L	GF	GA	GD	Pts	Qualification or relegation
6	Mainz 05	34	14	8	12	46	42	+4	50	Qualification for the Europa League group stage (Note: Since the winners of the 2015–16 DFB-Pokal, Bayern Munich, qualified for the Champions League based on league position, the Europa League group stage spot was passed to the sixth-placed team, Mainz 05; and the Europa League third qualifying round spot was passed to the seventh-placed team, Hertha BSC.)
7	Hertha BSC	34	14	8	12	42	42	0	50	Qualification for the Europa League third qualifying round
8	VfL Wolfsburg	34	12	9	13	47	49	−2	45	
9	1. FC Köln	34	10	13	11	38	42	−4	43	
10	Hamburger SV	34	11	8	15	40	46	−6	41	

Source: DFB
Rules for classification: 1) Points; 2) Goal difference; 3) Goals scored; 4) Head-to-head points; 5) Head-to-head goal difference; 6) Head-to-head away goals scored; 7) Away goals scored; 8) Play-offs.

==== Results summary ====
Overall								Home						Away					
Pld	W	D	L	GF	GA	GD	Pts	W	D	L	GF	GA	GD	W	D	L	GF	GA	GD
34	12	9	13	47	49	−2	45	9	5	3	32	17	+15	3	4	10	15	32	−17

Last updated: 14 May 2016.
Source: Bundesliga

==== Results by round ====
Round	1	2	3	4	5	6	7	8	9	10	11	12	13	14	15	16	17	18	19	20	21	22	23	24	25	26	27	28	29	30	31	32	33	34
Ground	H	A	H	A	H	A	H	A	H	A	H	A	H	A	H	H	A	A	H	A	H	A	H	A	H	A	H	A	H	A	H	A	A	H
Result	W	D	W	D	W	L	D	L	W	W	W	L	W	D	L	D	L	L	D	L	W	D	L	W	W	L	D	L	D	L	L	L	W	W
Position	5	6	3	3	3	4	4	9	4	4	3	3	3	3	5	4	7	7	7	8	8	8	8	8	7	8	8	8	8	8	10	10	8	8

Updated to match(es) played on 14 May 2016. Source: Bundesliga
A = Away; H = Home; W = Win; D = Draw; L = Loss

==== Matches ====
16 August 2015 1	VfL Wolfsburg	2–1	Eintracht Frankfurt	Wolfsburg
15:30 CEST (UTC+02:00)	Perišić 13'; Dost 17'; De Bruyne (yellow card) 45+3'	Report	Reinartz 19'; Zambrano (yellow card) 45+3'	Stadium: Volkswagen Arena; Attendance: 29,126; Referee: Christian Dingert

22 August 2015 2	1. FC Köln	1–1	VfL Wolfsburg	Cologne
15:30 CEST (UTC+02:00)	Zoller 30'; Lehmann (yellow card) 72'; Vogt (yellow card) 78'	Report	Bendtner 83'; Klose (yellow card) 88'	Stadium: RheinEnergieSTADION; Attendance: 46,000; Referee: Knut Kircher

28 August 2015 3	VfL Wolfsburg	3–0	Schalke 04	Wolfsburg
20:30 CEST (UTC+02:00)	Dost 17'; Luiz Gustavo (yellow card) 51'; R. Rodríguez 59' (pen.); Klose 61'	Report	Riether (yellow card) 52'; Aogo (yellow card) 73'	Stadium: Volkswagen Arena; Attendance: 30,000; Referee: Felix Brych

12 September 2015 4	FC Ingolstadt	0–0	VfL Wolfsburg	Ingolstadt
15:30 CEST (UTC+02:00)	Morales (yellow card) 35'; Levels (yellow card) 83'	Report	Guilavogui (yellow card) 26'; Luiz Gustavo (yellow card) 79'; Draxler (yellow card) 83'	Stadium: Audi Sportpark; Attendance: 14,095; Referee: Sascha Stegemann

19 September 2015 5	VfL Wolfsburg	2–0	Hertha BSC	Wolfsburg
15:30 CEST (UTC+02:00)	Draxler (yellow card) 57'; Dost 76', 88' (pen.)	Report	Plattenhardt (yellow card) 19'; Lustenberger (yellow card) 88'	Stadium: Volkswagen Arena; Attendance: 30,000; Referee: Günter Perl

22 September 2015 6	Bayern Munich	5–1	VfL Wolfsburg	Munich
20:00 CEST (UTC+02:00)	Lewandowski 51', 52', 55', 57', 60'; Vidal (yellow card) 82'	Report	Caligiuri 26', (yellow card) 42'; R. Rodríguez (yellow card) 74'	Stadium: Allianz Arena; Attendance: 75,000; Referee: Tobias Stieler

26 September 2015 7	VfL Wolfsburg	1–1	Hannover 96	Wolfsburg
15:30 CEST (UTC+02:00)	Guilavogui (yellow card) 26'; Dost 40'; Arnold (yellow card) 69'	Report	Kiyotake 57'; Felipe (yellow card) 83'; Marcelo (yellow card) 90+3'	Stadium: Volkswagen Arena; Attendance: 29,236; Referee: Deniz Aytekin

3 October 2015 8	Borussia Mönchengladbach	2–0	VfL Wolfsburg	Mönchengladbach
15:30 CEST (UTC+02:00)	Xhaka (yellow card) 44'; Johnson (yellow card) 44'; Nordtveit 75'; Traoré 79'	Report	Schäfer (yellow card) 41'; R. Rodríguez (yellow card) 68'; Kruse (yellow card) 77'	Stadium: Stadion im Borussia-Park; Attendance: 52,581; Referee: Felix Zwayer

17 October 2015 9	VfL Wolfsburg	4–2	TSG Hoffenheim	Wolfsburg
15:30 CEST (UTC+02:00)	Kruse 1', 62', 83'; Dost 7'; Caligiuri (yellow card) 57'; Träsch (yellow card) 59'; Luiz Gustavo (yellow card) 71'; Vieirinha (yellow card) 85'	Report	Toljan 29'; Schmid 54'	Stadium: Volkswagen Arena; Attendance: 28,148; Referee: Felix Brych

24 October 2015 10	Darmstadt 98	0–1	VfL Wolfsburg	Darmstadt
15:30 CEST (UTC+02:00)	Rausch (yellow card) 59'; Wagner (yellow card) 62'	Report	Dante (yellow card) 75'; Caligiuri 78'	Stadium: Merck-Stadion am Böllenfalltor; Attendance: 15,800; Referee: Günter Perl

31 October 2015 11	VfL Wolfsburg	2–1	Bayer Leverkusen	Wolfsburg
18:30 CET (UTC+01:00)	Bendtner 34'; Draxler 77'	Report	Papadopoulos (yellow card) 17'; Hernández 40'; Wendell (yellow card) 78'	Stadium: Volkswagen Arena; Attendance: 28,766; Referee: Manuel Gräfe

7 November 2015 12	Mainz 05	2–0	VfL Wolfsburg	Mainz
15:30 CET (UTC+01:00)	de Blasis 31'; Jairo (yellow card) 34'; Latza (yellow card) 57'; Mallı 75'	Report	Draxler (red card) 13'; Luiz Gustavo (yellow card) 35'; Caligiuri (yellow card) 76'; Dante (yellow card) 80'	Stadium: Coface Arena; Attendance: 26,331; Referee: Daniel Siebert

21 November 2015 13	VfL Wolfsburg	6–0	Werder Bremen	Wolfsburg
15:30 CET (UTC+01:00)	Gálvez 11' (o.g.); Kruse 44', 87'; Vieirinha 56'; Guilavogui 67'; Dost 78'	Report	Gálvez (yellow card) 26'; Fritz (yellow card) 43'	Stadium: Volkswagen Arena; Attendance: 30,000; Referee: Peter Sippel

29 November 2015 14	FC Augsburg	0–0	VfL Wolfsburg	Augsburg
17:30 CET (UTC+01:00)	Bobadilla (yellow card) 39'; Koo (yellow card) 53'; Caiuby (yellow card) 60'	Report	Naldo (yellow card) 44'; Dante (yellow card) 65' (yellow-red card) 85'; Caligiuri (yellow card) 83'	Stadium: WWK ARENA; Attendance: 27,081; Referee: Christian Dingert

5 December 2015 15	VfL Wolfsburg	1–2	Borussia Dortmund	Wolfsburg
18:30 CET (UTC+01:00)	Arnold (yellow card) 46'; Vieirinha (yellow card) 54'; Träsch (yellow card) 81'; R. Rodríguez 90+1' (pen.)	Report	Reus 32', (yellow card) 44'; Piszczek (yellow card) 90'; Kagawa 90+3'	Stadium: Volkswagen Arena; Attendance: 30,000; Referee: Tobias Stieler

12 December 2015 16	VfL Wolfsburg	1–1	Hamburger SV	Wolfsburg
15:30 CET (UTC+01:00)	Draxler (yellow card) 71'; Arnold 78'	Report	Lasogga (yellow card) 16'; N. Müller 21'; Jung (yellow card) 58'; Ostrzolek (yellow card) 74'; Gregoritsch (yellow card) 82'	Stadium: Volkswagen Arena; Attendance: 30,000; Referee: Wolfgang Stark

19 December 2015 17	VfB Stuttgart	3–1	VfL Wolfsburg	Stuttgart
18:30 CET (UTC+01:00)	Didavi 22', 47'; Kostić 31'; Šunjić (yellow card) 56' (yellow-red card) 70'; Niedermeier (yellow card) 76'	Report	Arnold 14'; Schürrle (yellow card) 68'	Stadium: Mercedes-Benz Arena; Attendance: 47,343; Referee: Felix Brych

24 January 2016 18	Eintracht Frankfurt	3–2	VfL Wolfsburg	Frankfurt
15:30 CET (UTC+01:00)	Huszti (yellow card) 56'; Meier 66', 73', 90+3'; Hasebe (yellow card) 85'	Report	Dante 25'; Schürrle 79'	Stadium: Commerzbank-Arena; Attendance: 35,000; Referee: Knut Kircher

31 January 2016 19	VfL Wolfsburg	1–1	1. FC Köln	Wolfsburg
15:30 CET (UTC+01:00)	Draxler 67'; Luiz Gustavo (yellow card) 77'; Jung (yellow card) 82'; Bendtner (yellow card) 89'	Report	Lehmann (yellow card) 45'; Modeste 75'	Stadium: Volkswagen Arena; Attendance: 29,156; Referee: Wolfgang Stark

6 February 2016 20	Schalke 04	3–0	VfL Wolfsburg	Gelsenkirchen
15:30 CET (UTC+01:00)	Huntelaar 24', (yellow card) 26'; Geis 35', (yellow card) 49'; Schöpf 87'	Report	Kruse (yellow card) 30'; Bendtner (yellow card) 58'; Knoche (yellow card) 62'	Stadium: Veltins-Arena; Attendance: 61,483; Referee: Tobias Welz

13 February 2016 21	VfL Wolfsburg	2–0	FC Ingolstadt	Wolfsburg
15:30 CET (UTC+01:00)	Draxler 29'; Knoche 39'	Report		Stadium: Volkswagen Arena; Attendance: 26,884; Referee: Patrick Ittrich

20 February 2016 22	Hertha BSC	1–1	VfL Wolfsburg	Berlin
15:30 CET (UTC+01:00)	Darida (yellow card) 10'; Skjelbred (yellow card) 42'; Kalou 60'; Ibišević (yellow card) 89'	Report	Schäfer 53'; Luiz Gustavo (yellow card) 90+1'; R. Rodríguez (yellow card) 90+3'	Stadium: Olympiastadion; Attendance: 40,126; Referee: Sascha Stegemann

27 February 2016 23	VfL Wolfsburg	0–2	Bayern Munich	Wolfsburg
15:30 CET (UTC+01:00)		Report	Coman 66'; Lewandowski 74'; Bernat (yellow card) 78'	Stadium: Volkswagen Arena; Attendance: 30,000; Referee: Manuel Gräfe

1 March 2016 24	Hannover 96	0–4	VfL Wolfsburg	Hanover
20:00 CET (UTC+01:00)	Wolf (yellow card) 42'; Schulz (yellow card) 56'	Report	Luiz Gustavo (yellow card) 24'; Schürrle 36', 59', 62'; Draxler 69'	Stadium: HDI-Arena; Attendance: 34,500; Referee: Bastian Dankert

5 March 2016 25	VfL Wolfsburg	2–1	Borussia Mönchengladbach	Wolfsburg
15:30 CET (UTC+01:00)	Draxler 15'; Kruse 17'; Schürrle (yellow card) 45+1'; Guilavogui (yellow card) 70'	Report	Raffael 23'; Dahoud (yellow card) 32'; Christensen (yellow card) 40'; Hazard (yellow card) 73'	Stadium: Volkswagen Arena; Attendance: 29,224; Referee: Daniel Siebert

12 March 2016 26	TSG Hoffenheim	1–0	VfL Wolfsburg	Sinsheim
15:30 CET (UTC+01:00)	Kramarić 3'; Baumann (yellow card) 89'	Report	Casteels (yellow card) 56'	Stadium: Wirsol Rhein-Neckar-Arena; Attendance: 25,231; Referee: Robert Hartmann

19 March 2016 27	VfL Wolfsburg	1–1	Darmstadt 98	Wolfsburg
15:30 CET (UTC+01:00)	Schürrle (yellow card) 45+1', (goal) 90+3'	Report	Wagner 82'; Gondorf (yellow card) 89'	Stadium: Volkswagen Arena; Attendance: 26,422; Referee: Markus Schmidt

1 April 2016 28	Bayer Leverkusen	3–0	VfL Wolfsburg	Leverkusen
20:30 CEST (UTC+02:00)	Brandt 27'; Hernández 73'; Yurchenko 87'	Report	Dante (yellow card) 58'; Draxler (yellow card) 76'; Arnold (yellow card) 82'; Schürrle (yellow card) 84'	Stadium: BayArena; Attendance: 29,239; Referee: Felix Brych

9 April 2016 29	VfL Wolfsburg	1–1	Mainz 05	Wolfsburg
18:30 CEST (UTC+02:00)	Naldo (yellow card) 27'; Schürrle 53'; Henrique (yellow card) 84'; Dante (yellow card) 86' (yellow-red card) 90+1'	Report	Latza (yellow card) 3'; Jairo 66'; Clemens (yellow card) 72'	Stadium: Volkswagen Arena; Attendance: 27,844; Referee: Günter Perl

16 April 2016 30	Werder Bremen	3–2	VfL Wolfsburg	Bremen
15:30 CEST (UTC+02:00)	S. García (yellow card) 26'; Pizarro 32' (pen.); Bartels 64'; Yatabaré 83'	Report	Schürrle (yellow card) 17'; Vieirinha (yellow card) 31'; Guilavogui 36'; Luiz Gustavo (yellow card) 77'; Benaglio (yellow card) 83'; Dost 86'; Arnold (yellow card) 88'	Stadium: Weserstadion; Attendance: 40,557; Referee: Wolfgang Stark

23 April 2016 31	VfL Wolfsburg	0–2	FC Augsburg	Wolfsburg
15:30 CEST (UTC+02:00)		Report	Finnbogason 1'; Baier (yellow card) 54'; Altıntop 57'; Caiuby (yellow card) 90+2'	Stadium: Volkswagen Arena; Attendance: 27,261; Referee: Knut Kircher

30 April 2016 32	Borussia Dortmund	5–1	VfL Wolfsburg	Dortmund
15:30 CEST (UTC+02:00)	Kagawa 7'; Ramos 9'; Weigl (yellow card) 44'; Reus (yellow card) 53', (goal) 59'; Aubameyang 77', 78'	Report	Schürrle 86'	Stadium: Signal Iduna Park; Attendance: 81,359; Referee: Robert Hartmann

7 May 2016 33	Hamburger SV	0–1	VfL Wolfsburg	Hamburg
15:30 CEST (UTC+02:00)		Report	Luiz Gustavo 73'	Stadium: Volksparkstadion; Attendance: 57,000; Referee: Benjamin Brand

14 May 2016 34	VfL Wolfsburg	3–1	VfB Stuttgart	Wolfsburg
15:30 CEST (UTC+02:00)	Arnold 11'; Schürrle 29', 90+2'; Kruse (yellow card) 36'; Dante (yellow card) 85'	Report	Kostić (yellow card) 55'; Didavi 78'; Schwaab (yellow card) 88'	Stadium: Volkswagen Arena; Attendance: 30,000; Referee: Manuel Gräfe

=== DFB-Pokal ===
8 August 2015 Round 1	Stuttgarter Kickers	1–4	VfL Wolfsburg	Stuttgart
15:30 CEST (UTC+02:00)	Bahn (yellow card) 73'; Badiane 79'; Gaiser (yellow card) 83'	Report	Kruse 4'; Dost 45'; De Bruyne 47'; Bendtner 86'	Stadium: GAZİ-Stadion auf der Waldau; Attendance: 9,760; Referee: Sascha Stegemann

27 October 2015 Round 2	VfL Wolfsburg	1–3	Bayern Munich	Wolfsburg
20:30 CET (UTC+01:00)	Naldo (yellow card) 62'; Dante (yellow card) 77'; Schürrle 90'	Report	Douglas Costa 15'; Coman (yellow card) 19'; Müller 20', 34'; Alonso (yellow card) 53'	Stadium: Volkswagen Arena; Attendance: 30,000; Referee: Knut Kircher

=== UEFA Champions League ===
==== Group stage ====
Pos	Team	Pld	W	D	L	GF	GA	GD	Pts	Qualification	WOL	PSV	MUN	CSKA
1	(Germany) VfL Wolfsburg	6	4	0	2	9	6	+3	12	Advance to knockout phase	—	2–0	3–2	1–0
2	(Netherlands) PSV Eindhoven	6	3	1	2	8	7	+1	10	Advance to knockout phase	2–0	—	2–1	2–1
3	(England) Manchester United	6	2	2	2	7	7	0	8	Transfer to Europa League	2–1	0–0	—	1–0
4	(Russia) CSKA Moscow	6	1	1	4	5	9	−4	4		0–2	3–2	1–1	—

Source: UEFA
Rules for classification: Group stage tiebreakers

15 September 2015 1	VfL Wolfsburg (Germany)	1–0	(Russia) CSKA Moscow	Wolfsburg, Germany
20:45 CEST (UTC+02:00)	Draxler 40'	Report		Stadium: Volkswagen Arena; Attendance: 20,126; Referee: Svein Oddvar Moen (Norway)

30 September 2015 2	Manchester United (England)	2–1	(Germany) VfL Wolfsburg	Manchester, England
20:45 CEST (UTC+02:00)	Mata 34' (pen.); Schneiderlin (yellow card) 39'; Schweinsteiger (yellow card) 41'; Smalling 53'; Depay (yellow card) 61'; Young (yellow card) 79'	Report	Caligiuri 4', (yellow card) 33'	Stadium: Old Trafford; Attendance: 74,811; Referee: Viktor Kassai (Hungary)

21 October 2015 3	VfL Wolfsburg (Germany)	2–0	(Netherlands) PSV Eindhoven	Wolfsburg, Germany
20:45 CEST (UTC+02:00)	Naldo (yellow card) 43'; Dost 46'; Kruse 57'; Benaglio (yellow card) 90'	Report		Stadium: Volkswagen Arena; Attendance: 23,375; Referee: Alberto Undiano Mallenco (Spain)

3 November 2015 4	PSV Eindhoven (Netherlands)	2–0	(Germany) VfL Wolfsburg	Eindhoven, Netherlands
20:45 CET (UTC+01:00)	Guardado (yellow card) 45+2'; Locadia 55'; Arias (yellow card) 81'; De Jong (yellow card) 85', (goal) 86'	Report	Arnold (yellow card) 30'; Caligiuri (yellow card) 39'; Naldo (yellow card) 90'	Stadium: Philips Stadion; Attendance: 35,000; Referee: Jonas Eriksson (Sweden)

25 November 2015 5	CSKA Moscow (Russia)	0–2	(Germany) VfL Wolfsburg	Khimki, Russia
18:00 CET (UTC+01:00)	Musa (yellow card) 17'; Fernandes (yellow card) 28'; Wernbloom (yellow card) 62'; Natcho (yellow card) 90+3'	Report	Akinfeev 67' (o.g.); Schürrle 88'	Stadium: Arena Khimki; Attendance: 16,450; Referee: Gianluca Rocchi (Italy)

8 December 2015 6	VfL Wolfsburg (Germany)	3–2	(England) Manchester United	Wolfsburg, Germany
20:45 CET (UTC+01:00)	Naldo 13', 84', (yellow card) 72'; Vieirinha 29'; Schürrle (yellow card) 59'	Report	Martial 10'; Darmian (yellow card) 17'; Guilavogui 82' (o.g.); Varela (yellow card) 90+2'	Stadium: Volkswagen Arena; Attendance: 26,400; Referee: Milorad Mažić (Serbia)

==== Knockout phase ====
===== Round of 16 =====
17 February 2016 First leg	Gent (Belgium)	2–3	(Germany) VfL Wolfsburg	Ghent, Belgium
20:45 CET (UTC+01:00)	Kums (yellow card) 59', (goal) 80'; Coulibaly 89'	Report	Draxler 44', 54'; Luiz Gustavo (yellow card) 47'; Vieirinha (yellow card) 48'; Kruse 60'	Stadium: Ghelamco Arena; Attendance: 19,978; Referee: Svein Oddvar Moen (Norway)

8 March 2016 Second leg	VfL Wolfsburg (Germany)	1–0 (4–2 agg.)	(Belgium) Gent	Wolfsburg, Germany
20:45 CET (UTC+01:00)	Schürrle 74'	Report		Stadium: Volkswagen Arena; Attendance: 23,475; Referee: Damir Skomina (Slovenia)

===== Quarter-finals =====
6 April 2016 First leg	VfL Wolfsburg (Germany)	2–0	(Spain) Real Madrid	Wolfsburg, Germany
20:45 CEST (UTC+02:00)	R. Rodríguez 18' (pen.); Vieirinha (yellow card) 19'; Arnold 25', (yellow card) 69'; Benaglio (yellow card) 50'; Luiz Gustavo (yellow card) 61'	Report	Bale (yellow card) 69'	Stadium: Volkswagen Arena; Attendance: 26,400; Referee: Gianluca Rocchi (Italy)

12 April 2016 Second leg	Real Madrid (Spain)	3–0 (3–2 agg.)	(Germany) VfL Wolfsburg	Madrid, Spain
20:45 CEST (UTC+02:00)	Ronaldo 15', 17', 77', (yellow card) 80'	Report	Arnold (yellow card) 45+2'; Luiz Gustavo (yellow card) 76'; Dante (yellow card) 85'; Vieirinha (yellow card) 90+1'	Stadium: Santiago Bernabéu; Attendance: 76,684; Referee: Viktor Kassai (Hungary)

== Statistics ==
=== Appearances and goals ===
No.	Pos	Nat	Player	Total		Bundesliga		DFB-Pokal		DFL-Supercup		UEFA Champions League	
No.	Pos	Nat	Player	Apps	Goals	Apps	Goals	Apps	Goals	Apps	Goals	Apps	Goals
Goalkeepers
1	GK	(Switzerland) SUI	Diego Benaglio	30	0	21	0	1	0	0	0	8	0
20	GK	(Germany) GER	Max Grün	0	0	0	0	0	0	0	0	0	0
28	GK	(Belgium) BEL	Koen Casteels	17	0	13	0	1	0	1	0	2	0
Defenders
4	DF	(Germany) GER	Marcel Schäfer	27	1	14+7	1	0+1	0	0	0	1+4	0
5	DF	(Switzerland) SUI	Timm Klose	12	1	7+1	1	1	0	1	0	1+1	0
6	DF	(Peru) PER	Carlos Ascues	1	0	0+1	0	0	0	0	0	0	0
15	DF	(Germany) GER	Christian Träsch	38	0	23+6	0	1	0	0	0	7+1	0
18	DF	(Brazil) BRA	Dante	33	1	23	1	1	0	0	0	9	0
24	DF	(Germany) GER	Sebastian Jung	16	0	5+6	0	0+1	0	0	0	2+2	0
25	DF	(Brazil) BRA	Naldo	40	2	29	0	2	0	1	0	8	2
26	DF	(Brazil) BRA	Felipe	0	0	0	0	0	0	0	0	0	0
31	DF	(Germany) GER	Robin Knoche	13	1	9+2	1	0	0	0	0	2	0
34	DF	(Switzerland) SUI	Ricardo Rodríguez	36	3	23+1	2	2	0	1	0	9	1
37	DF	(Germany) GER	Moritz Sprenger	0	0	0	0	0	0	0	0	0	0
Midfielders
7	MF	(Italy) ITA	Daniel Caligiuri	40	3	20+9	2	1+1	0	1	0	5+3	1
8	MF	(Portugal) POR	Vieirinha	37	2	22+4	1	2	0	1	0	5+3	1
10	MF	(Germany) GER	Julian Draxler	31	8	19+2	5	1	0	0	0	8+1	3
17	MF	(Germany) GER	André Schürrle	41	9	21+8	6	0+1	1	0+1	0	6+4	2
22	MF	(Brazil) BRA	Luiz Gustavo	30	0	22	0	1	0	0	0	7	0
23	MF	(France) FRA	Josuha Guilavogui	42	2	26+4	2	2	0	1	0	8+1	0
27	MF	(Germany) GER	Maximilian Arnold	44	3	22+9	2	1+1	0	1	0	8+2	1
30	MF	(Germany) GER	Paul Seguin	4	0	2+2	0	0	0	0	0	0	0
35	MF	(Switzerland) SUI	Francisco Rodríguez	1	0	0+1	0	0	0	0	0	0	0
38	MF	(Belgium) BEL	Ismail Azzaoui	2	0	0+2	0	0	0	0	0	0	0
Forwards
11	FW	(Germany) GER	Max Kruse	43	9	28+4	6	1	1	0+1	0	7+2	2
12	FW	(Netherlands) NED	Bas Dost	31	10	14+8	8	2	1	1	0	5+1	1
16	FW	(Brazil) BRA	Bruno Henrique	10	0	2+5	0	0	0	1	0	0+2	0
32	FW	(Poland) POL	Oskar Zawada	5	0	0+4	0	0	0	0	0	0+1	0
33	FW	(Germany) GER	Sebastian Stolze	0	0	0	0	0	0	0	0	0	0
Players transferred out during the season
10	MF	(Germany) GER	Aaron Hunt	3	0	1+1	0	0	0	1	0	0	0
14	MF	(Belgium) BEL	Kevin De Bruyne	4	1	2	0	1	1	1	0	0	0
3	FW	(Denmark) DEN	Nicklas Bendtner	19	4	4+9	2	0+1	1	0+1	1	0+4	0
9	FW	(Croatia) CRO	Ivan Perišić	4	1	2	1	1	0	1	0	0	0

Last updated: 14 May 2016
Source: Competitions

=== Goalscorers ===
This includes all competitive matches. The list is sorted by shirt number when total goals are equal.

Rank	Pos.	No.	Nat.	Name	Bundesliga	DFB-Pokal	Champions League	Super Cup	Total
1	FW	12	(Netherlands)	Bas Dost	8	1	1	0	10
2	FW	11	(Germany)	Max Kruse	6	1	2	0	9
2	FW	17	(Germany)	André Schürrle	6	1	2	0	9
3	MF	10	(Germany)	Julian Draxler	5	0	3	0	8
5	FW	3	(Denmark)	Nicklas Bendtner	2	1	0	1	4
6	MF	7	(Italy)	Daniel Caligiuri	2	0	1	0	3
6	MF	27	(Germany)	Maximilian Arnold	2	0	1	0	3
6	DF	34	(Switzerland)	Ricardo Rodríguez	2	0	1	0	3
7	MF	8	(Portugal)	Vieirinha	1	0	1	0	2
7	MF	23	(France)	Josuha Guilavogui	2	0	0	0	2
7	DF	25	(Brazil)	Naldo	0	0	2	0	2
11	DF	4	(Germany)	Marcel Schäfer	1	0	0	0	1
11	DF	5	(Switzerland)	Timm Klose	1	0	0	0	1
11	FW	9	(Croatia)	Ivan Perišić	1	0	0	0	1
11	MF	14	(Belgium)	Kevin De Bruyne	0	1	0	0	1
11	DF	18	(Brazil)	Dante	1	0	0	0	1
11	DF	31	(Germany)	Robin Knoche	1	0	0	0	1
Own Goals					1	0	1	0	2
Total					42	5	15	1	63
