= VfL Wolfsburg in European football =

German club in European football

- Club: VfL Wolfsburg
- Seasons played: 8
- First entry: 1999–2000 UEFA Cup
- Latest entry: 2021–22 UEFA Champions League

Titles
- Champions League: 0
- Europa League: 0
- Cup Winners' Cup: 0
- Intertoto Cup: 0
- Super Cup: 0

VfL Wolfsburg is a German association football club based in Wolfsburg, Lower Saxony. The club was founded in 1945, as VSK Wolfsburg, growing out of a multi-sports club for Volkswagen workers in the city of Wolfsburg. Men's professional football is run by the spin-off organization VfL Wolfsburg-Fußball GmbH, a wholly owned subsidiary of the Volkswagen Group. VfL Wolfsburg plays its home matches at the Volkswagen Arena.

== History ==
Having finished as sixth place in 1999 in the German top flight, Wolfsburg gained entry to continental football for the first time, specifically the 1999–2000 UEFA Cup, where they fell in the third round against Atlético Madrid. They also qualified for the UEFA Intertoto Cup in 2000, 2001, 2003, 2004 and 2005, enjoying their best run in 2003 after reaching the final in which they lost to Italian side Perugia.

In the 2008–09 season, Wolfsburg won their maiden Bundesliga title, thus qualifying for the UEFA Champions League for the first time in their history. They came third in their group, behind Manchester United and CSKA Moscow, losing the chance for a place in the competition's successive round. As a result, they qualified for the Round of 32 phase of the UEFA Europa League. They defeated Spanish side Villarreal 6–3 on aggregate and Russian champions Rubin Kazan 3–2. In the quarter-finals, however, they were beaten 3–1 by eventual finalists Fulham.

Their best performance in Europe was during the 2015–16 season, when they reached the quarter-finals of the Champions League after passing through a group with Manchester United, CSKA Moscow and PSV Eindhoven, and beating Gent in the round of 32. They faced Spanish giants Real Madrid, winning the first leg on Volkswagen Arena 2–0, only to lose the return leg in Santiago Bernabéu 0–3.

== Matches ==
| Season | Competition | Round | Opponent | Home | Away | Aggregate |
|---|---|---|---|---|---|---|
| 1999–2000 | UEFA Cup | First round | (Hungary) Debrecen | 2–0 | 1–2 | 3–2 |
| 1999–2000 | UEFA Cup | Second round | (Netherlands) Roda | 1–0 | 0–0 | 1–0 |
| 1999–2000 | UEFA Cup | Third round | (Spain) Atlético Madrid | 2–3 | 1–2 | 3–5 |
| 2000 | UEFA Intertoto Cup | Third round | (France) Sedan | 2–1 | 0–0 | 2–1 |
| 2000 | UEFA Intertoto Cup | Semi-finals | (France) Auxerre | 1–2 (a.e.t.) | 1–1 | 2–3 |
| 2001 | UEFA Intertoto Cup | Third round | (Belarus) Dinamo Minsk | 4–3 | 0–0 | 4–3 |
| 2001 | UEFA Intertoto Cup | Semi-finals | (France) Troyes | 2–2 | 0–1 | 2–3 |
| 2003 | UEFA Intertoto Cup | Second round | (Bulgaria) Marek Dupnitsa | 2–0 | 1–1 | 3–1 |
| 2003 | UEFA Intertoto Cup | Third round | (Czech Republic) Slovácko | 2–0 | 1–0 | 3–0 |
| 2003 | UEFA Intertoto Cup | Semi-finals | (Croatia) Cibalia | 4–0 | 4–1 | 8–1 |
| 2003 | UEFA Intertoto Cup | Finals | (Italy) Perugia | 0–2 | 0–1 | 0–3 |
| 2004 | UEFA Intertoto Cup | Second round | (Switzerland) Thun | 2–3 | 1–4 | 3–7 |
| 2005 | UEFA Intertoto Cup | Second round | (Austria) Sturm Graz | 2–2 | 3–1 | 5–3 |
| 2005 | UEFA Intertoto Cup | Third round | (Sweden) IFK Göteborg | 2–0 | 2–0 | 4–0 |
| 2005 | UEFA Intertoto Cup | Semi-finals | (France) Lens | 0–0 | 0–4 | 0–4 |
| 2008–09 | UEFA Cup | First round | (Romania) Rapid București | 1–0 | 1–1 | 2–1 |
| 2008–09 | UEFA Cup | Group E | (Italy) Milan | —N/a | 2–2 | 1st |
| 2008–09 | UEFA Cup | Group E | (Portugal) Braga | —N/a | 3-2 | 1st |
| 2008–09 | UEFA Cup | Group E | (England) Portsmouth | 3–2 | —N/a | 1st |
| 2008–09 | UEFA Cup | Group E | (Netherlands) Heerenveen | 5–1 | —N/a | 1st |
| 2008–09 | UEFA Cup | Round of 32 | (France) Paris Saint-Germain | 1–3 | 0–2 | 1–5 |
| 2009–10 | UEFA Champions League | Group B | (England) Manchester United | 1–3 | 1–2 | 3rd |
| 2009–10 | UEFA Champions League | Group B | (Russia) CSKA Moscow | 3–1 | 1–2 | 3rd |
| 2009–10 | UEFA Champions League | Group B | (Turkey) Beşiktaş | 0–0 | 3–0 | 3rd |
| 2009–10 | UEFA Europa League | Round of 32 | (Spain) Villarreal | 4–1 | 2–2 | 6–3 |
| 2009–10 | UEFA Europa League | Round of 16 | (Russia) Rubin Kazan | 2–1 (a.e.t.) | 1–1 | 3–2 |
| 2009–10 | UEFA Europa League | Quarter-finals | (England) Fulham | 0–1 | 1–2 | 1–3 |
| 2014–15 | UEFA Europa League | Group H | (England) Everton | 0–2 | 1–4 | 2nd |
| 2014–15 | UEFA Europa League | Group H | (France) Lille | 1–1 | 3–0 | 2nd |
| 2014–15 | UEFA Europa League | Group H | (Russia) Krasnodar | 5–1 | 4–2 | 2nd |
| 2014–15 | UEFA Europa League | Round of 32 | (Portugal) Sporting CP | 2–0 | 0–0 | 2–0 |
| 2014–15 | UEFA Europa League | Round of 16 | (Italy) Inter Milan | 3–1 | 2–1 | 5–2 |
| 2014–15 | UEFA Europa League | Quarter-finals | (Italy) Napoli | 1–4 | 2–2 | 3–5 |
| 2015–16 | UEFA Champions League | Group B | (England) Manchester United | 3–2 | 1–2 | 1st |
| 2015–16 | UEFA Champions League | Group B | (Netherlands) PSV Eindhoven | 2–0 | 0–2 | 1st |
| 2015–16 | UEFA Champions League | Group B | (Russia) CSKA Moscow | 1–0 | 2–0 | 1st |
| 2015–16 | UEFA Champions League | Round of 16 | (Belgium) Gent | 1–0 | 3–2 | 4–2 |
| 2015–16 | UEFA Champions League | Quarter-finals | (Spain) Real Madrid | 2–0 | 0–3 | 2–3 |
| 2019–20 | UEFA Europa League | Group I | (Belgium) Gent | 1–3 | 2–2 | 2nd |
| 2019–20 | UEFA Europa League | Group I | (France) Saint-Étienne | 1–0 | 1–1 | 2nd |
| 2019–20 | UEFA Europa League | Group I | (Ukraine) Oleksandriya | 3–1 | 1–0 | 2nd |
| 2019–20 | UEFA Europa League | Round of 32 | (Sweden) Malmö FF | 2–1 | 3–0 | 5–1 |
| 2019–20 | UEFA Europa League | Round of 16 | (Ukraine) Shakhtar Donetsk | 1–2 | 0–3 | 1–5 |
| 2020–21 | UEFA Europa League | Second qualifying round | (Albania) Kukësi | —N/a | 4–0 | —N/a |
| 2020–21 | UEFA Europa League | Third qualifying round | (Ukraine) Desna Chernihiv | 2–0 | —N/a | —N/a |
| 2020–21 | UEFA Europa League | Play-off round | (Greece) AEK Athens | —N/a | 1–2 | —N/a |
| 2021–22 | UEFA Champions League | Group G | (France) Lille | 1–3 | 0–0 | 4th |
| 2021–22 | UEFA Champions League | Group G | (Spain) Sevilla | 1–1 | 0–2 | 4th |
| 2021–22 | UEFA Champions League | Group G | (Austria) Red Bull Salzburg | 2–1 | 1–3 | 4th |

== Overall record ==
=== By competition ===
| Competition | Pld | W | D | L | GF | GA | GD | Win% |
|---|---|---|---|---|---|---|---|---|
| UEFA Champions League | 22 | 10 | 3 | 9 | 29 | 29 | +0 | 45.45 |
| UEFA Cup / Europa League | 45 | 21 | 10 | 14 | 79 | 61 | +18 | 46.67 |
| UEFA Intertoto Cup | 24 | 10 | 7 | 7 | 36 | 29 | +7 | 41.67 |
| Total | 91 | 41 | 20 | 30 | 144 | 119 | +25 | 45.05 |

=== By country ===
As of 1 October 2020

| Country | Pld | W | D | L | GF | GA | GD |
|---|---|---|---|---|---|---|---|
| Albania | 1 | 1 | 0 | 0 | 4 | 0 | +4 |
| Austria | 2 | 1 | 1 | 0 | 5 | 3 | +2 |
| Belarus | 2 | 1 | 1 | 0 | 4 | 3 | +1 |
| Belgium | 4 | 2 | 1 | 1 | 7 | 7 | 0 |
| Greece | 1 | 0 | 0 | 1 | 1 | 2 | –2 |
| Bulgaria | 2 | 1 | 1 | 0 | 3 | 1 | +2 |
| Croatia | 2 | 2 | 0 | 0 | 8 | 1 | +7 |
| Czech Republic | 2 | 2 | 0 | 0 | 3 | 0 | +3 |
| England | 9 | 2 | 0 | 7 | 11 | 20 | −9 |
| France | 14 | 3 | 6 | 5 | 13 | 18 | −5 |
| Hungary | 2 | 1 | 0 | 1 | 3 | 2 | +1 |
| Italy | 7 | 2 | 2 | 3 | 10 | 13 | −3 |
| Netherlands | 5 | 3 | 1 | 1 | 8 | 3 | +5 |
| Portugal | 3 | 2 | 1 | 0 | 5 | 2 | +3 |
| Romania | 2 | 1 | 1 | 0 | 2 | 1 | +1 |
| Russia | 8 | 6 | 1 | 1 | 19 | 8 | +11 |
| Spain | 6 | 2 | 1 | 3 | 11 | 11 | 0 |
| Switzerland | 2 | 0 | 0 | 2 | 3 | 7 | −4 |
| Sweden | 4 | 4 | 0 | 0 | 9 | 1 | +8 |
| Turkey | 2 | 1 | 1 | 0 | 3 | 0 | +3 |
| Ukraine | 5 | 3 | 0 | 2 | 7 | 6 | +1 |
