= 2015–16 UEFA Europa League knockout phase =

International football competition

The 2015–16 UEFA Europa League knockout phase began on 16 February and concluded on 18 May 2016 with the final at St. Jakob-Park in Basel, Switzerland, to decide the champions of the 2015–16 UEFA Europa League. A total of 32 teams competed in the knockout phase.

Times up to 26 March 2016 (round of 32 and round of 16) were CET (UTC+1), thereafter (quarter-finals and beyond) times were CEST (UTC+2).

== Round and draw dates ==
All draws were held at UEFA headquarters in Nyon, Switzerland.

Round	Draw date and time	First leg	Second leg
Round of 32	14 December 2015, 13:00	18 February 2016	25 February 2016
Round of 16	26 February 2016, 13:00	10 March 2016	17 March 2016
Quarter-finals	18 March 2016, 13:00	7 April 2016	14 April 2016
Semi-finals	15 April 2016, 12:30	28 April 2016	5 May 2016
Final	15 April 2016, 12:30	18 May 2016 at St. Jakob-Park, Basel	

Matches may have also been played on Tuesdays or Wednesdays instead of the regular Thursdays due to scheduling conflicts.

== Format ==
The knockout phase involved 32 teams: the 24 teams which qualified as winners and runners-up of each of the twelve groups in the group stage, and the eight third-placed teams from the Champions League group stage.

Each tie in the knockout phase, apart from the final, was played over two legs, with each team playing one leg at home. The team that scored more goals on aggregate over the two legs advanced to the next round. If the aggregate score was level, the away goals rule would be applied, i.e. the team that scored more goals away from home over the two legs advanced. If away goals were also equal, then thirty minutes of extra time would be played. The away goals rule would be again applied after extra time, i.e. if there were goals scored during extra time and the aggregate score was still level, the visiting team would advance by virtue of more away goals scored. If no goals were scored during extra time, the tie would be decided by penalty shoot-out. In the final, which was played as a single match, if scores were level at the end of normal time, extra time would be played, followed by penalty shoot-out if scores remained tied.

The mechanism of the draws for each round was as follows:

- In the draw for the round of 32, the twelve group winners and the four third-placed teams from the Champions League group stage with the better group records were seeded, and the twelve group runners-up and the other four third-placed teams from the Champions League group stage were unseeded. The seeded teams were drawn against the unseeded teams, with the seeded teams hosting the second leg. Teams from the same group or the same association could not be drawn against each other.
- In the draws for the round of 16 onwards, there were no seedings, and teams from the same group or the same association could be drawn against each other.

On 17 July 2014, the UEFA emergency panel ruled that Ukrainian and Russian clubs would not be drawn against each other "until further notice" due to the political unrest between the countries.

== Qualified teams ==
=== Europa League group stage winners and runners-up ===
Group	Winners (Seeded in round of 32 draw)	Runners-up (Unseeded in round of 32 draw)
A	(Norway) Molde	(Turkey) Fenerbahçe
B	(England) Liverpool	(Switzerland) Sion
C	(Russia) Krasnodar	(Germany) Borussia Dortmund
D	(Italy) Napoli	(Denmark) Midtjylland
E	(Austria) Rapid Wien	(Spain) Villarreal
F	(Portugal) Braga	(France) Marseille
G	(Italy) Lazio	(France) Saint-Étienne
H	(Russia) Lokomotiv Moscow	(Portugal) Sporting CP
I	(Switzerland) Basel	(Italy) Fiorentina
J	(England) Tottenham Hotspur	(Belgium) Anderlecht
K	(Germany) Schalke 04	(Czech Republic) Sparta Prague
L	(Spain) Athletic Bilbao	(Germany) FC Augsburg

=== Champions League group stage third-placed teams ===
Pos	Grp	Team	Pld	W	D	L	GF	GA	GD	Pts	Seeding
1	G	(Portugal) Porto	6	4	0	2	16	6	+10	12	Seeded in round of 32 draw
2	F	(Greece) Olympiacos	6	3	1	2	8	13	−5	10	Seeded in round of 32 draw
3	B	(England) Manchester United	6	2	2	2	7	7	0	8	Seeded in round of 32 draw
4	E	(Germany) Bayer Leverkusen	6	1	3	2	13	12	+1	6	Seeded in round of 32 draw
5	D	(Spain) Sevilla	6	2	0	4	4	11	−7	6	Unseeded in round of 32 draw
6	H	(Spain) Valencia	6	2	0	4	5	9	−4	6	Unseeded in round of 32 draw
7	C	(Turkey) Galatasaray	6	1	2	3	6	10	−4	5	Unseeded in round of 32 draw
8	A	(Ukraine) Shakhtar Donetsk	6	1	0	5	7	14	−7	3	Unseeded in round of 32 draw

Source: UEFA
Rules for classification: 1) Points; 2) Goal difference; 3) Goals scored; 4) Away goals scored; 5) Wins; 6) Away wins; 7) Disciplinary points; 8) Club coefficient.

== Bracket ==
Round of 32
(Spain) Villarreal	1	1	2
(Italy) Napoli	0	1	1
(Portugal) Sporting CP	0	1	1
(Germany) Bayer Leverkusen	1	3	4
(Czech Republic) Sparta Prague	1	3	4
(Russia) Krasnodar	0	0	0
(Turkey) Galatasaray	1	1	2
(Italy) Lazio	1	3	4
(Germany) Borussia Dortmund	2	1	3
(Portugal) Porto	0	0	0
(Italy) Fiorentina	1	0	1
(England) Tottenham Hotspur	1	3	4
(Germany) FC Augsburg	0	0	0
(England) Liverpool	0	1	1
(Denmark) Midtjylland	2	1	3
(England) Manchester United	1	5	6
(Turkey) Fenerbahçe	2	1	3
(Russia) Lokomotiv Moscow	0	1	1
(Switzerland) Sion	1	2	3
(Portugal) Braga	2	2	4
(Ukraine) Shakhtar Donetsk	0	3	3
(Germany) Schalke 04	0	0	0
(Belgium) Anderlecht (a.e.t.)	1	2	3
(Greece) Olympiacos	0	1	1
(France) Marseille	0	1	1
(Spain) Athletic Bilbao	1	1	2
(Spain) Valencia	6	4	10
(Austria) Rapid Wien	0	0	0
(France) Saint-Étienne	3	1	4
(Switzerland) Basel (a)	2	2	4
(Spain) Sevilla	3	0	3
(Norway) Molde	0	1	1

Round of 16
(Spain) Villarreal	2	0	2
(Germany) Bayer Leverkusen	0	0	0
(Czech Republic) Sparta Prague	1	3	4
(Italy) Lazio	1	0	1
(Germany) Borussia Dortmund	3	2	5
(England) Tottenham Hotspur	0	1	1
(England) Liverpool	2	1	3
(England) Manchester United	0	1	1
(Turkey) Fenerbahçe	1	1	2
(Portugal) Braga	0	4	4
(Ukraine) Shakhtar Donetsk	3	1	4
(Belgium) Anderlecht	1	0	1
(Spain) Athletic Bilbao (a)	1	1	2
(Spain) Valencia	0	2	2
(Switzerland) Basel	0	0	0
(Spain) Sevilla	0	3	3

Quarter-finals
(Spain) Villarreal	2	4	6
(Czech Republic) Sparta Prague	1	2	3
(Germany) Borussia Dortmund	1	3	4
(England) Liverpool	1	4	5
(Portugal) Braga	1	0	1
(Ukraine) Shakhtar Donetsk	2	4	6
(Spain) Athletic Bilbao	1	2	3 (4)
(Spain) Sevilla (p)	2	1	3 (5)

Semi-finals
(Spain) Villarreal	1	0	1
(England) Liverpool	0	3	3
(Ukraine) Shakhtar Donetsk	2	1	3
(Spain) Sevilla	2	3	5

Final
18 May – Basel
(England) Liverpool	1
(Spain) Sevilla	3

== Round of 32 ==
The draw was held on 14 December 2015. The first legs were played on 16 and 18 February, and the second legs were played on 24 and 25 February 2016.

=== Summary ===
Team 1	Agg.	Team 2	1st leg	2nd leg
Valencia (Spain)	10–0	(Austria) Rapid Wien	6–0	4–0
Fiorentina (Italy)	1–4	(England) Tottenham Hotspur	1–1	0–3
Borussia Dortmund (Germany)	3–0	(Portugal) Porto	2–0	1–0
Fenerbahçe (Turkey)	3–1	(Russia) Lokomotiv Moscow	2–0	1–1
Anderlecht (Belgium)	3–1	(Greece) Olympiacos	1–0	2–1 (a.e.t.)
Midtjylland (Denmark)	3–6	(England) Manchester United	2–1	1–5
FC Augsburg (Germany)	0–1	(England) Liverpool	0–0	0–1
Sparta Prague (Czech Republic)	4–0	(Russia) Krasnodar	1–0	3–0
Galatasaray (Turkey)	2–4	(Italy) Lazio	1–1	1–3
Sion (Switzerland)	3–4	(Portugal) Braga	1–2	2–2
Shakhtar Donetsk (Ukraine)	3–0	(Germany) Schalke 04	0–0	3–0
Marseille (France)	1–2	(Spain) Athletic Bilbao	0–1	1–1
Sevilla (Spain)	3–1	(Norway) Molde	3–0	0–1
Sporting CP (Portugal)	1–4	(Germany) Bayer Leverkusen	0–1	1–3
Villarreal (Spain)	2–1	(Italy) Napoli	1–0	1–1
Saint-Étienne (France)	4–4 (a)	(Switzerland) Basel	3–2	1–2

=== Matches ===
18 February 2016
21:05

Valencia (Spain)	6–0	(Austria) Rapid Wien
Mina 4', 25'; Parejo 10'; Negredo 29'; Gomes 35'; Rodrigo 89'	Report

Mestalla, Valencia
Attendance: 28,831
Referee: Miroslav Zelinka (Czech Republic)
25 February 2016
19:00

Rapid Wien (Austria)	0–4	(Spain) Valencia
	Report	Rodrigo 59'; Feghouli 64'; Piatti 72'; Vezo 88'

Ernst-Happel-Stadion, Vienna
Attendance: 39,800
Referee: Paolo Tagliavento (Italy)

Valencia won 10–0 on aggregate.

18 February 2016
19:00

Fiorentina (Italy)	1–1	(England) Tottenham Hotspur
Bernardeschi 59'	Report	Chadli 37' (pen.)

Stadio Artemio Franchi, Florence
Attendance: 15,200
Referee: Felix Zwayer (Germany)
25 February 2016
21:05

Tottenham Hotspur (England)	3–0	(Italy) Fiorentina
Mason 25'; Lamela 63'; Gonzalo 81' (o.g.)	Report

White Hart Lane, London
Attendance: 34,880
Referee: Ovidiu Hațegan (Romania)

Tottenham Hotspur won 4–1 on aggregate.

18 February 2016
19:00

Borussia Dortmund (Germany)	2–0	(Portugal) Porto
Piszczek 6'; Reus 71'	Report

Signal Iduna Park, Dortmund
Attendance: 65,851
Referee: Luca Banti (Italy)
25 February 2016
21:05

Porto (Portugal)	0–1	(Germany) Borussia Dortmund
	Report	Casillas 23' (o.g.)

Estádio do Dragão, Porto
Attendance: 32,707
Referee: Mark Clattenburg (England)

Borussia Dortmund won 3–0 on aggregate.

16 February 2016
18:00

Fenerbahçe (Turkey)	2–0	(Russia) Lokomotiv Moscow
Souza 18', 72'	Report

Şükrü Saracoğlu Stadium, Istanbul
Attendance: 36,195
Referee: Martin Strömbergsson (Sweden)
25 February 2016
17:00

Lokomotiv Moscow (Russia)	1–1	(Turkey) Fenerbahçe
Samedov 45'	Report	Topal 83'

Lokomotiv Stadium, Moscow
Attendance: 15,695
Referee: Ivan Kružliak (Slovakia)

Fenerbahçe won 3–1 on aggregate.

18 February 2016
19:00

Anderlecht (Belgium)	1–0	(Greece) Olympiacos
Mbodji 67'	Report

Constant Vanden Stock Stadium, Brussels
Attendance: 15,397
Referee: Ivan Bebek (Croatia)
25 February 2016
21:05

Olympiacos (Greece)	1–2 (a.e.t.)	(Belgium) Anderlecht
Fortounis 29' (pen.)	Report	Acheampong 102', 111'

Karaiskakis Stadium, Piraeus
Attendance: 31,005
Referee: Arnold Hunter (Northern Ireland)

Anderlecht won 3–1 on aggregate.

18 February 2016
19:00

Midtjylland (Denmark)	2–1	(England) Manchester United
Sisto 44'; Onuachu 77'	Report	Depay 37'

MCH Arena, Herning
Attendance: 9,182
Referee: Artur Soares Dias (Portugal)
25 February 2016
21:05

Manchester United (England)	5–1	(Denmark) Midtjylland
Bodurov 32' (o.g.); Rashford 64', 75'; Herrera 88' (pen.); Depay 90'	Report	Sisto 28'

Old Trafford, Manchester
Attendance: 58,609
Referee: István Vad (Hungary)

Manchester United won 6–3 on aggregate.

18 February 2016
21:05

FC Augsburg (Germany)	0–0	(England) Liverpool
	Report

WWK ARENA, Augsburg
Attendance: 25,000
Referee: David Fernández Borbalán (Spain)
25 February 2016
19:00

Liverpool (England)	1–0	(Germany) FC Augsburg
Milner 5' (pen.)	Report

Anfield, Liverpool
Attendance: 43,081
Referee: Clément Turpin (France)

Liverpool won 1–0 on aggregate.

18 February 2016
21:05

Sparta Prague (Czech Republic)	1–0	(Russia) Krasnodar
Juliš 64'	Report

Generali Arena, Prague
Attendance: 14,120
Referee: Slavko Vinčić (Slovenia)
25 February 2016
19:00

Krasnodar (Russia)	0–3	(Czech Republic) Sparta Prague
	Report	Mareček 51'; Frýdek 57'; Fatai 70'

Kuban Stadium, Krasnodar
Attendance: 14,850
Referee: Stefan Johannesson (Sweden)

Sparta Prague won 4–0 on aggregate.

18 February 2016
21:05

Galatasaray (Turkey)	1–1	(Italy) Lazio
Sarıoğlu 12'	Report	Milinković-Savić 21'

Türk Telekom Arena, Istanbul
Attendance: 33,353
Referee: Michael Oliver (England)
25 February 2016
19:00

Lazio (Italy)	3–1	(Turkey) Galatasaray
Parolo 59'; Felipe Anderson 61'; Klose 72'	Report	Öztekin 62'

Stadio Olimpico, Rome
Attendance: 14,019
Referee: Vladislav Bezborodov (Russia)

Lazio won 4–2 on aggregate.

18 February 2016
21:05

Sion (Switzerland)	1–2	(Portugal) Braga
Konaté 53'	Report	Stojiljković 13'; Rafa 61'

Stade de Tourbillon, Sion
Attendance: 9,000
Referee: Yevhen Aranovsky (Ukraine)
24 February 2016
18:00

Braga (Portugal)	2–2	(Switzerland) Sion
Josué 27' (pen.); Stojiljković 48'	Report	Gekas 16', 29'

Estádio Municipal, Braga
Attendance: 6,759
Referee: Liran Liany (Israel)

Braga won 4–3 on aggregate.

18 February 2016
21:05

Shakhtar Donetsk (Ukraine)	0–0	(Germany) Schalke 04
	Report

Arena Lviv, Lviv (Note: Shakhtar Donetsk played their home matches at Arena Lviv, Lviv, instead of their regular stadium Donbas Arena, Donetsk, due to the war conditions in Eastern Ukraine.)
Attendance: 23,615
Referee: Hüseyin Göçek (Turkey)
25 February 2016
19:00

Schalke 04 (Germany)	0–3	(Ukraine) Shakhtar Donetsk
	Report	Marlos 27'; Ferreyra 63'; Kovalenko 77'

Veltins-Arena, Gelsenkirchen
Attendance: 45,308
Referee: Matej Jug (Slovenia)

Shakhtar Donetsk won 3–0 on aggregate.

18 February 2016
21:05

Marseille (France)	0–1	(Spain) Athletic Bilbao
	Report	Aduriz 54'

Stade Vélodrome, Marseille
Attendance: 29,727
Referee: Craig Thomson (Scotland)
25 February 2016
19:00

Athletic Bilbao (Spain)	1–1	(France) Marseille
S. Merino 81'	Report	Batshuayi 40'

San Mamés, Bilbao
Attendance: 38,259
Referee: Aleksei Kulbakov (Belarus)

Athletic Bilbao won 2–1 on aggregate.

18 February 2016
19:00

Sevilla (Spain)	3–0	(Norway) Molde
Llorente 35', 49'; Gameiro 72'	Report

Ramón Sánchez Pizjuán, Seville
Attendance: 28,920
Referee: Gediminas Mažeika (Lithuania)
25 February 2016
21:05

Molde (Norway)	1–0	(Spain) Sevilla
E. Hestad 43'	Report

Aker Stadion, Molde
Attendance: 7,284
Referee: Bobby Madden (Scotland)

Sevilla won 3–1 on aggregate.

18 February 2016
21:05

Sporting CP (Portugal)	0–1	(Germany) Bayer Leverkusen
	Report	Bellarabi 26'

Estádio José Alvalade, Lisbon
Attendance: 26,201
Referee: Björn Kuipers (Netherlands)
25 February 2016
19:00

Bayer Leverkusen (Germany)	3–1	(Portugal) Sporting CP
Bellarabi 30', 65'; Çalhanoğlu 87'	Report	João Mário 38'

BayArena, Leverkusen
Attendance: 26,585
Referee: Ruddy Buquet (France)

Bayer Leverkusen won 4–1 on aggregate.

18 February 2016
19:00

Villarreal (Spain)	1–0	(Italy) Napoli
Suárez 82'	Report

El Madrigal, Villarreal
Attendance: 17,686
Referee: Bas Nijhuis (Netherlands)
25 February 2016
21:05

Napoli (Italy)	1–1	(Spain) Villarreal
Hamšík 17'	Report	Pina 59'

Stadio San Paolo, Naples
Attendance: 23,928
Referee: Deniz Aytekin (Germany)

Villarreal won 2–1 on aggregate.

18 February 2016
19:00

Saint-Étienne (France)	3–2	(Switzerland) Basel
Sall 9'; Monnet-Paquet 39'; Bahebeck 77'	Report	Samuel 44'; Janko 56' (pen.)

Stade Geoffroy-Guichard, Saint-Étienne
Attendance: 27,013
Referee: Anastasios Sidiropoulos (Greece)
25 February 2016
21:05

Basel (Switzerland)	2–1	(France) Saint-Étienne
Zuffi 15', 90+2'	Report	Sall 90'

St. Jakob-Park, Basel
Attendance: 20,976
Referee: Danny Makkelie (Netherlands)

4–4 on aggregate; Basel won on away goals.

== Round of 16 ==
The draw was held on 26 February 2016. The first legs were played on 10 March, and the second legs were played on 17 March 2016.

=== Summary ===
Team 1	Agg.	Team 2	1st leg	2nd leg
Shakhtar Donetsk (Ukraine)	4–1	(Belgium) Anderlecht	3–1	1–0
Basel (Switzerland)	0–3	(Spain) Sevilla	0–0	0–3
Villarreal (Spain)	2–0	(Germany) Bayer Leverkusen	2–0	0–0
Athletic Bilbao (Spain)	2–2 (a)	(Spain) Valencia	1–0	1–2
Liverpool (England)	3–1	(England) Manchester United	2–0	1–1
Sparta Prague (Czech Republic)	4–1	(Italy) Lazio	1–1	3–0
Borussia Dortmund (Germany)	5–1	(England) Tottenham Hotspur	3–0	2–1
Fenerbahçe (Turkey)	2–4	(Portugal) Braga	1–0	1–4

=== Matches ===
10 March 2016
19:00

Shakhtar Donetsk (Ukraine)	3–1	(Belgium) Anderlecht
Taison 21'; Kucher 24'; Eduardo 79'	Report	Acheampong 69'

Arena Lviv, Lviv
Attendance: 23,621
Referee: Artur Soares Dias (Portugal)
17 March 2016
21:05

Anderlecht (Belgium)	0–1	(Ukraine) Shakhtar Donetsk
	Report	Eduardo 90+3'

Constant Vanden Stock Stadium, Brussels
Attendance: 13,785
Referee: Antonio Mateu Lahoz (Spain)

Shakhtar Donetsk won 4–1 on aggregate.

10 March 2016
19:00

Basel (Switzerland)	0–0	(Spain) Sevilla
	Report

St. Jakob-Park, Basel
Attendance: 22,403
Referee: Anthony Taylor (England)
17 March 2016
21:05

Sevilla (Spain)	3–0	(Switzerland) Basel
Rami 35'; Gameiro 44', 45'	Report

Ramón Sánchez Pizjuán, Seville
Attendance: 35,546
Referee: Deniz Aytekin (Germany)

Sevilla won 3–0 on aggregate.

10 March 2016
21:05

Villarreal (Spain)	2–0	(Germany) Bayer Leverkusen
Bakambu 4', 56'	Report

El Madrigal, Villarreal
Attendance: 16,211
Referee: Gianluca Rocchi (Italy)
17 March 2016
19:00

Bayer Leverkusen (Germany)	0–0	(Spain) Villarreal
	Report

BayArena, Leverkusen
Attendance: 23,409
Referee: Willie Collum (Scotland)

Villarreal won 2–0 on aggregate.

10 March 2016
21:05

Athletic Bilbao (Spain)	1–0	(Spain) Valencia
R. García 20'	Report

San Mamés, Bilbao
Attendance: 35,765
Referee: Björn Kuipers (Netherlands)
17 March 2016
19:00

Valencia (Spain)	2–1	(Spain) Athletic Bilbao
Mina 13'; Santos 37'	Report	Aduriz 76'

Mestalla, Valencia
Attendance: 31,681
Referee: Daniele Orsato (Italy)

2–2 on aggregate; Athletic Bilbao won on away goals.

10 March 2016
21:05

Liverpool (England)	2–0	(England) Manchester United
Sturridge 20' (pen.); Firmino 73'	Report

Anfield, Liverpool
Attendance: 43,228
Referee: Carlos Velasco Carballo (Spain)
17 March 2016
21:05 (Note: The Manchester United v Liverpool match was originally to kick off at 19:00 (18:00 UTC+0), but was put back to 21:05 (20:05 UTC+0) after a request from the Trafford Metropolitan Borough Council.)

Manchester United (England)	1–1	(England) Liverpool
Martial 32' (pen.)	Report	Coutinho 45'

Old Trafford, Manchester
Attendance: 75,180
Referee: Milorad Mažić (Serbia)

Liverpool won 3–1 on aggregate.

10 March 2016
21:05

Sparta Prague (Czech Republic)	1–1	(Italy) Lazio
Frýdek 13'	Report	Parolo 38'

Generali Arena, Prague
Attendance: 17,482
Referee: Alberto Undiano Mallenco (Spain)
17 March 2016
19:00

Lazio (Italy)	0–3	(Czech Republic) Sparta Prague
	Report	Dočkal 10'; Krejčí 12'; Juliš 44'

Stadio Olimpico, Rome
Attendance: 18,827
Referee: Ruddy Buquet (France)

Sparta Prague won 4–1 on aggregate.

10 March 2016
19:00

Borussia Dortmund (Germany)	3–0	(England) Tottenham Hotspur
Aubameyang 30'; Reus 61', 70'	Report

Signal Iduna Park, Dortmund
Attendance: 65,848
Referee: Cüneyt Çakır (Turkey)
17 March 2016
21:05

Tottenham Hotspur (England)	1–2	(Germany) Borussia Dortmund
Son Heung-min 74'	Report	Aubameyang 24', 71'

White Hart Lane, London
Attendance: 34,593
Referee: Nicola Rizzoli (Italy)

Borussia Dortmund won 5–1 on aggregate.

10 March 2016
19:00

Fenerbahçe (Turkey)	1–0	(Portugal) Braga
Topal 82'	Report

Şükrü Saracoğlu Stadium, Istanbul
Attendance: 40,197
Referee: Clément Turpin (France)
17 March 2016
21:05

Braga (Portugal)	4–1	(Turkey) Fenerbahçe
Hassan 11'; Josué 69' (pen.); Stojiljković 74'; Rafa 83'	Report	Potuk 45+3'

Estádio Municipal, Braga
Attendance: 16,431
Referee: Ivan Bebek (Croatia)

Braga won 4–2 on aggregate.

== Quarter-finals ==
The draw was held on 18 March 2016. The first legs were played on 7 April, and the second legs were played on 14 April 2016.

=== Summary ===
Team 1	Agg.	Team 2	1st leg	2nd leg
Braga (Portugal)	1–6	(Ukraine) Shakhtar Donetsk	1–2	0–4
Villarreal (Spain)	6–3	(Czech Republic) Sparta Prague	2–1	4–2
Athletic Bilbao (Spain)	3–3 (4–5 p)	(Spain) Sevilla	1–2	2–1 (a.e.t.)
Borussia Dortmund (Germany)	4–5	(England) Liverpool	1–1	3–4

=== Matches ===
7 April 2016
21:05

Braga (Portugal)	1–2	(Ukraine) Shakhtar Donetsk
Eduardo 89'	Report	Rakitskiy 45'; Ferreyra 75'

Estádio Municipal, Braga
Attendance: 21,645
Referee: Jonas Eriksson (Sweden)
14 April 2016
21:05

Shakhtar Donetsk (Ukraine)	4–0	(Portugal) Braga
Srna 25' (pen.); Ferreira 43', 73' (o.g.); Kovalenko 50'	Report

Arena Lviv, Lviv
Attendance: 33,617
Referee: Pavel Královec (Czech Republic)

Shakhtar Donetsk won 6–1 on aggregate.

7 April 2016
21:05

Villarreal (Spain)	2–1	(Czech Republic) Sparta Prague
Bakambu 3', 63'	Report	Brabec 45+4'

El Madrigal, Villarreal
Attendance: 15,803
Referee: Ovidiu Hațegan (Romania)
14 April 2016
21:05

Sparta Prague (Czech Republic)	2–4	(Spain) Villarreal
Dočkal 65'; Krejčí 71'	Report	Bakambu 5', 49'; Castillejo 43'; Lafata 45+1' (o.g.)

Generali Arena, Prague
Attendance: 18,201
Referee: Martin Atkinson (England)

Villarreal won 6–3 on aggregate.

7 April 2016
21:05

Athletic Bilbao (Spain)	1–2	(Spain) Sevilla
Aduriz 48'	Report	Kolodziejczak 56'; Iborra 83'

San Mamés, Bilbao
Attendance: 40,856
Referee: Mark Clattenburg (England)
14 April 2016
21:05

Sevilla (Spain)	1–2 (a.e.t.)	(Spain) Athletic Bilbao
Gameiro 59'	Report	Aduriz 57'; R. García 80'
Penalties
Coke (penalty scored); Krychowiak (penalty scored); Konoplyanka (penalty scored); Nzonzi (penalty scored); Gameiro (penalty scored)	5–4	(penalty scored) R. García; (penalty scored) Viguera; (penalty scored) San José; (penalty missed) Beñat; (penalty scored) Susaeta

Ramón Sánchez Pizjuán, Seville
Attendance: 38,567
Referee: Damir Skomina (Slovenia)

3–3 on aggregate; Sevilla won 5–4 on penalties.

7 April 2016
21:05

Borussia Dortmund (Germany)	1–1	(England) Liverpool
Hummels 48'	Report	Origi 36'

Signal Iduna Park, Dortmund
Attendance: 65,848
Referee: Carlos Velasco Carballo (Spain)
14 April 2016
21:05

Liverpool (England)	4–3	(Germany) Borussia Dortmund
Origi 48'; Coutinho 66'; Sakho 78'; Lovren 90+1'	Report	Mkhitaryan 5'; Aubameyang 9'; Reus 57'

Anfield, Liverpool
Attendance: 42,984
Referee: Cüneyt Çakır (Turkey)

Liverpool won 5–4 on aggregate.

== Semi-finals ==
The draw was held on 15 April 2016. The first legs were played on 28 April, and the second legs were played on 5 May 2016.

=== Summary ===
Team 1	Agg.	Team 2	1st leg	2nd leg
Shakhtar Donetsk (Ukraine)	3–5	(Spain) Sevilla	2–2	1–3
Villarreal (Spain)	1–3	(England) Liverpool	1–0	0–3

=== Matches ===
28 April 2016
21:05

Shakhtar Donetsk (Ukraine)	2–2	(Spain) Sevilla
Marlos 23'; Stepanenko 36'	Report	Vitolo 6'; Gameiro 82' (pen.)

Arena Lviv, Lviv
Attendance: 34,267
Referee: Szymon Marciniak (Poland)
5 May 2016
21:05

Sevilla (Spain)	3–1	(Ukraine) Shakhtar Donetsk
Gameiro 9', 47'; Mariano 59'	Report	Eduardo 44'

Ramón Sánchez Pizjuán, Seville
Attendance: 41,286
Referee: Björn Kuipers (Netherlands)

Sevilla won 5–3 on aggregate.

28 April 2016
21:05

Villarreal (Spain)	1–0	(England) Liverpool
López 90+2'	Report

El Madrigal, Villarreal
Attendance: 21,606
Referee: Damir Skomina (Slovenia)
5 May 2016
21:05

Liverpool (England)	3–0	(Spain) Villarreal
Soriano 7' (o.g.); Sturridge 63'; Lallana 81'	Report

Anfield, Liverpool
Attendance: 43,074
Referee: Viktor Kassai (Hungary)

Liverpool won 3–1 on aggregate.

== Final ==
The final was played on 18 May 2016 at the St. Jakob-Park in Basel, Switzerland. The "home" team (for administrative purposes) was determined by an additional draw held after the semi-final draw.

18 May 2016
20:45

Liverpool (England)	1–3	(Spain) Sevilla
Sturridge 35'	Report	Gameiro 46'; Coke 64', 70'

St. Jakob-Park, Basel
Attendance: 34,429
Referee: Jonas Eriksson (Sweden)
