= Moritz Sprenger =

German footballer

Personal information
- Date of birth: 22 February 1995 (age 31)
- Place of birth: Magdeburg, Germany
- Height: 1.90 m (6 ft 3 in)
- Position: Defender

Youth career
- –2007: MTV Gifhorn
- 2007–2014: VfL Wolfsburg

Senior career*
Years	Team	Apps	(Gls)
2014–2018	VfL Wolfsburg II	38	(0)
2016–2017	→ 1. FC Magdeburg (loan)	12	(0)
- * Club domestic league appearances and goals as of 31 July 2017

Moritz Sprenger (born 22 February 1995) is a German former footballer who played as a defender.

Born in Magdeburg, Sprenger started playing football in Gifhorn, Lower Saxony. He moved to VfL Wolfsburg at age 12, eventually joining their reserve squad in 2014. After playing in 38 league matches and winning the Regionalliga Nord in 2016, Sprenger also played in the promotion play-offs. However, Wolfsburg lost to Jahn Regensburg and remained in the Regionalliga.

For the next season, Sprenger joined 1. FC Magdeburg in the 3. Liga on loan. He made his professional league debut in a 3–0 loss to Fortuna Köln.

== Honours ==
VfL Wolfsburg II

- Regionalliga Nord: 2016
