= 2015–16 UEFA Champions League knockout phase =

International football competition

The 2015–16 UEFA Champions League knockout phase began on 16 February and concluded on 28 May 2016 with the final at Stadio San Siro in Milan, Italy, to decide the champions of the 2015–16 UEFA Champions League. A total of 16 teams competed in the knockout phase.

Times are CET/CEST, (Note: CET (UTC+1) for matches from 5 April 2016, and CEST (UTC+2) for matches to 16 March 2016.) as listed by UEFA (local times, if different, are in parentheses).

== Round and draw dates ==
All draws were held at UEFA headquarters in Nyon, Switzerland.

| Round | Draw date and time | First leg | Second leg |
|---|---|---|---|
| Round of 16 | 14 December 2015, 12:00 | 16–17 & 23–24 February 2016 | 8–9 & 15–16 March 2016 |
| Quarter-finals | 18 March 2016, 12:00 | 5–6 April 2016 | 12–13 April 2016 |
| Semi-finals | 15 April 2016, 11:30 | 26–27 April 2016 | 3–4 May 2016 |
| Final | 15 April 2016, 11:30 | 28 May 2016 at Stadio San Siro, Milan | |

== Format ==
The knockout phase involved the 16 teams which qualified as winners and runners-up of each of the eight groups in the group stage.

Each tie in the knockout phase, apart from the final, was played over two legs, with each team playing one leg at home. The team that scored more goals on aggregate over the two legs advanced to the next round. If the aggregate score was level, the away goals rule would be applied, i.e. the team that scored more goals away from home over the two legs advanced. If away goals were also equal, then thirty minutes of extra time would be played. The away goals rule would be again applied after extra time, i.e. if there were goals scored during extra time and the aggregate score was still level, the visiting team would advance by virtue of more away goals scored. If no goals were scored during extra time, the tie would be decided by penalty shoot-out. In the final, which was played as a single match, if scores were level at the end of normal time, extra time would be played, followed by penalty shoot-out if scores remained tied.

The mechanism of the draws for each round was as follows:

- In the draw for the round of 16, the eight group winners were seeded, and the eight group runners-up were unseeded. The seeded teams were drawn against the unseeded teams, with the seeded teams hosting the second leg. Teams from the same group or the same association could not be drawn against each other.
- In the draws for the quarter-finals onwards, there were no seedings, and teams from the same group or the same association could be drawn against each other.

On 17 July 2014, the UEFA emergency panel ruled that Ukrainian and Russian clubs would not be drawn against each other "until further notice" due to the political unrest between the countries.

== Qualified teams ==
| Group | Winners (Seeded in round of 16 draw) | Runners-up (Unseeded in round of 16 draw) |
|---|---|---|
| A | (Spain) Real Madrid | (France) Paris Saint-Germain |
| B | (Germany) VfL Wolfsburg | (Netherlands) PSV Eindhoven |
| C | (Spain) Atlético Madrid | (Portugal) Benfica |
| D | (England) Manchester City | (Italy) Juventus |
| E | (Spain) Barcelona | (Italy) Roma |
| F | (Germany) Bayern Munich | (England) Arsenal |
| G | (England) Chelsea | (Ukraine) Dynamo Kyiv |
| H | (Russia) Zenit Saint Petersburg | (Belgium) Gent |

== Bracket ==
Round of 16
(France) Paris Saint-Germain | 2 | 2 | 4
(England) Chelsea | 1 | 1 | 2
(Ukraine) Dynamo Kyiv | 1 | 0 | 1
(England) Manchester City | 3 | 0 | 3
(Belgium) Gent | 2 | 0 | 2
(Germany) VfL Wolfsburg | 3 | 1 | 4
(Italy) Roma | 0 | 0 | 0
(Spain) Real Madrid | 2 | 2 | 4
(England) Arsenal | 0 | 1 | 1
(Spain) Barcelona | 2 | 3 | 5
(Netherlands) PSV Eindhoven | 0 | 0 | 0 (7)
(Spain) Atlético Madrid (p) | 0 | 0 | 0 (8)
(Italy) Juventus | 2 | 2 | 4
(Germany) Bayern Munich (a.e.t.) | 2 | 4 | 6
(Portugal) Benfica | 1 | 2 | 3
(Russia) Zenit Saint Petersburg | 0 | 1 | 1

Quarter-finals
(France) Paris Saint-Germain | 2 | 0 | 2
(England) Manchester City | 2 | 1 | 3
(Germany) VfL Wolfsburg | 2 | 0 | 2
(Spain) Real Madrid | 0 | 3 | 3
(Spain) Barcelona | 2 | 0 | 2
(Spain) Atlético Madrid | 1 | 2 | 3
(Germany) Bayern Munich | 1 | 2 | 3
(Portugal) Benfica | 0 | 2 | 2

Semi-finals
(England) Manchester City | 0 | 0 | 0
(Spain) Real Madrid | 0 | 1 | 1
(Spain) Atlético Madrid (a) | 1 | 1 | 2
(Germany) Bayern Munich | 0 | 2 | 2

Final
28 May – Milan
(Spain) Real Madrid (p) | 1 (5)
(Spain) Atlético Madrid | 1 (3)

== Round of 16 ==
The draw was held on 14 December 2015. The first legs were played on 16, 17, 23 and 24 February, and the second legs were played on 8, 9, 15 and 16 March 2016.

=== Summary ===
| Team 1 | Agg. | Team 2 | 1st leg | 2nd leg |
|---|---|---|---|---|
| Gent (Belgium) | 2–4 | (Germany) VfL Wolfsburg | 2–3 | 0–1 |
| Roma (Italy) | 0–4 | (Spain) Real Madrid | 0–2 | 0–2 |
| Paris Saint-Germain (France) | 4–2 | (England) Chelsea | 2–1 | 2–1 |
| Arsenal (England) | 1–5 | (Spain) Barcelona | 0–2 | 1–3 |
| Juventus (Italy) | 4–6 | (Germany) Bayern Munich | 2–2 | 2–4 (a.e.t.) |
| PSV Eindhoven (Netherlands) | 0–0 (7–8 p) | (Spain) Atlético Madrid | 0–0 | 0–0 (a.e.t.) |
| Benfica (Portugal) | 3–1 | (Russia) Zenit Saint Petersburg | 1–0 | 2–1 |
| Dynamo Kyiv (Ukraine) | 1–3 | (England) Manchester City | 1–3 | 0–0 |

=== Matches ===
17 February 2016
20:45

| Gent (Belgium) | 2–3 | (Germany) VfL Wolfsburg |
|---|---|---|
| Kums 80'; Coulibaly 89' | Report | Draxler 44', 54'; Kruse 60' |

Ghelamco Arena, Ghent
Attendance: 19,978
Referee: Svein Oddvar Moen (Norway)
8 March 2016
20:45

| VfL Wolfsburg (Germany) | 1–0 | (Belgium) Gent |
|---|---|---|
| Schürrle 74' | Report |

Volkswagen Arena, Wolfsburg
Attendance: 23,457
Referee: Damir Skomina (Slovenia)

VfL Wolfsburg won 4–2 on aggregate.

17 February 2016
20:45

| Roma (Italy) | 0–2 | (Spain) Real Madrid |
|---|---|---|
| | Report | Ronaldo 57'; Jesé 86' |

Stadio Olimpico, Rome
Attendance: 55,612
Referee: Pavel Královec (Czech Republic)
8 March 2016
20:45

| Real Madrid (Spain) | 2–0 | (Italy) Roma |
|---|---|---|
| Ronaldo 64'; Rodríguez 68' | Report |

Santiago Bernabéu, Madrid
Attendance: 76,654
Referee: Szymon Marciniak (Poland)

Real Madrid won 4–0 on aggregate.

16 February 2016
20:45

| Paris Saint-Germain (France) | 2–1 | (England) Chelsea |
|---|---|---|
| Ibrahimović 39'; Cavani 78' | Report | Mikel 45+1' |

Parc des Princes, Paris
Attendance: 46,505
Referee: Carlos Velasco Carballo (Spain)
9 March 2016
20:45 (19:45 UTC+0)

| Chelsea (England) | 1–2 | (France) Paris Saint-Germain |
|---|---|---|
| Costa 27' | Report | Rabiot 16'; Ibrahimović 67' |

Stamford Bridge, London
Attendance: 37,591
Referee: Felix Brych (Germany)

Paris Saint-Germain won 4–2 on aggregate.

23 February 2016
20:45 (19:45 UTC+0)

| Arsenal (England) | 0–2 | (Spain) Barcelona |
|---|---|---|
| | Report | Messi 71', 83' (pen.) |

Emirates Stadium, London
Attendance: 59,889
Referee: Cüneyt Çakır (Turkey)
16 March 2016
20:45

| Barcelona (Spain) | 3–1 | (England) Arsenal |
|---|---|---|
| Neymar 18'; Suárez 65'; Messi 88' | Report | Elneny 51' |

Camp Nou, Barcelona
Attendance: 76,092
Referee: Sergei Karasev (Russia)

Barcelona won 5–1 on aggregate.

23 February 2016
20:45

| Juventus (Italy) | 2–2 | (Germany) Bayern Munich |
|---|---|---|
| Dybala 63'; Sturaro 76' | Report | Müller 43'; Robben 55' |

Juventus Stadium, Turin
Attendance: 41,332
Referee: Martin Atkinson (England)
16 March 2016
20:45

| Bayern Munich (Germany) | 4–2 (a.e.t.) | (Italy) Juventus |
|---|---|---|
| Lewandowski 73'; Müller 90+1'; Thiago 108'; Coman 110' | Report | Pogba 5'; Cuadrado 28' |

Allianz Arena, Munich
Attendance: 70,000
Referee: Jonas Eriksson (Sweden)

Bayern Munich won 6–4 on aggregate.

24 February 2016
20:45

| PSV Eindhoven (Netherlands) | 0–0 | (Spain) Atlético Madrid |
|---|---|---|
| | Report |

Philips Stadion, Eindhoven
Attendance: 34,948
Referee: Daniele Orsato (Italy)
15 March 2016
20:45

| Atlético Madrid (Spain) | 0–0 (a.e.t.) | (Netherlands) PSV Eindhoven |
|---|---|---|
| | Report |
Penalties
| Griezmann (penalty scored); Gabi (penalty scored); Koke (penalty scored); Saúl (penalty scored); F. Torres (penalty scored); Giménez (penalty scored); Filipe Luís (penalty scored); Juanfran (penalty scored) | 8–7 | (penalty scored) Van Ginkel; (penalty scored) Guardado; (penalty scored) Pröpper; (penalty scored) Bruma; (penalty scored) Moreno; (penalty scored) Lestienne; (penalty scored) Arias; (penalty missed) Narsingh |

Vicente Calderón, Madrid
Attendance: 50,135
Referee: Mark Clattenburg (England)

0–0 on aggregate; Atlético Madrid won 8–7 on penalties.

16 February 2016
20:45 (19:45 UTC+0)

| Benfica (Portugal) | 1–0 | (Russia) Zenit Saint Petersburg |
|---|---|---|
| Jonas 90+1' | Report |

Estádio da Luz, Lisbon
Attendance: 48,615
Referee: Gianluca Rocchi (Italy)
9 March 2016
18:00 (20:00 UTC+3)

| Zenit Saint Petersburg (Russia) | 1–2 | (Portugal) Benfica |
|---|---|---|
| Hulk 69' | Report | Gaitán 85'; Talisca 90+6' |

Petrovsky Stadium, Saint Petersburg
Attendance: 17,688
Referee: Viktor Kassai (Hungary)

Benfica won 3–1 on aggregate.

24 February 2016
20:45 (21:45 UTC+2)

| Dynamo Kyiv (Ukraine) | 1–3 | (England) Manchester City |
|---|---|---|
| Buyalskyi 59' | Report | Agüero 15'; Silva 40'; Touré 90' |

Olympic Stadium, Kyiv
Attendance: 53,691
Referee: Antonio Mateu Lahoz (Spain)
15 March 2016
20:45 (19:45 UTC+0)

| Manchester City (England) | 0–0 | (Ukraine) Dynamo Kyiv |
|---|---|---|
| | Report |

City of Manchester Stadium, Manchester
Attendance: 43,630
Referee: Ovidiu Hațegan (Romania)

Manchester City won 3–1 on aggregate.

== Quarter-finals ==
The draw was held on 18 March 2016. The first legs were played on 5 and 6 April, and the second legs were played on 12 and 13 April 2016.

=== Summary ===
| Team 1 | Agg. | Team 2 | 1st leg | 2nd leg |
|---|---|---|---|---|
| VfL Wolfsburg (Germany) | 2–3 | (Spain) Real Madrid | 2–0 | 0–3 |
| Bayern Munich (Germany) | 3–2 | (Portugal) Benfica | 1–0 | 2–2 |
| Barcelona (Spain) | 2–3 | (Spain) Atlético Madrid | 2–1 | 0–2 |
| Paris Saint-Germain (France) | 2–3 | (England) Manchester City | 2–2 | 0–1 |

=== Matches ===
6 April 2016
20:45

| VfL Wolfsburg (Germany) | 2–0 | (Spain) Real Madrid |
|---|---|---|
| Rodriguez 18' (pen.); Arnold 25' | Report |

Volkswagen Arena, Wolfsburg
Attendance: 26,400
Referee: Gianluca Rocchi (Italy)
12 April 2016
20:45

| Real Madrid (Spain) | 3–0 | (Germany) VfL Wolfsburg |
|---|---|---|
| Ronaldo 15', 17', 77' | Report |

Santiago Bernabéu, Madrid
Attendance: 76,684
Referee: Viktor Kassai (Hungary)

Real Madrid won 3–2 on aggregate.

5 April 2016
20:45

| Bayern Munich (Germany) | 1–0 | (Portugal) Benfica |
|---|---|---|
| Vidal 2' | Report |

Allianz Arena, Munich
Attendance: 70,000
Referee: Szymon Marciniak (Poland)
13 April 2016
20:45 (19:45 UTC+1)

| Benfica (Portugal) | 2–2 | (Germany) Bayern Munich |
|---|---|---|
| Jiménez 27'; Talisca 76' | Report | Vidal 38'; Müller 52' |

Estádio da Luz, Lisbon
Attendance: 63,235
Referee: Björn Kuipers (Netherlands)

Bayern Munich won 3–2 on aggregate.

5 April 2016
20:45

| Barcelona (Spain) | 2–1 | (Spain) Atlético Madrid |
|---|---|---|
| Suárez 63', 74' | Report | F. Torres 25' |

Camp Nou, Barcelona
Attendance: 88,534
Referee: Felix Brych (Germany)
13 April 2016
20:45

| Atlético Madrid (Spain) | 2–0 | (Spain) Barcelona |
|---|---|---|
| Griezmann 36', 88' (pen.) | Report |

Vicente Calderón, Madrid
Attendance: 52,851
Referee: Nicola Rizzoli (Italy)

Atlético Madrid won 3–2 on aggregate.

6 April 2016
20:45

| Paris Saint-Germain (France) | 2–2 | (England) Manchester City |
|---|---|---|
| Ibrahimović 41'; Rabiot 59' | Report | De Bruyne 38'; Fernandinho 72' |

Parc des Princes, Paris
Attendance: 47,228
Referee: Milorad Mažić (Serbia)
12 April 2016
20:45 (19:45 UTC+1)

| Manchester City (England) | 1–0 | (France) Paris Saint-Germain |
|---|---|---|
| De Bruyne 76' | Report |

City of Manchester Stadium, Manchester
Attendance: 53,039
Referee: Carlos Velasco Carballo (Spain)

Manchester City won 3–2 on aggregate.

== Semi-finals ==
The draw was held on 15 April 2016. The first legs were played on 26 and 27 April, and the second legs were played on 3 and 4 May 2016.

=== Summary ===
| Team 1 | Agg. | Team 2 | 1st leg | 2nd leg |
|---|---|---|---|---|
| Manchester City (England) | 0–1 | (Spain) Real Madrid | 0–0 | 0–1 |
| Atlético Madrid (Spain) | 2–2 (a) | (Germany) Bayern Munich | 1–0 | 1–2 |

=== Matches ===
26 April 2016
20:45 (19:45 UTC+1)

| Manchester City (England) | 0–0 | (Spain) Real Madrid |
|---|---|---|
| | Report |

City of Manchester Stadium, Manchester
Attendance: 52,221
Referee: Cüneyt Çakır (Turkey)
4 May 2016
20:45

| Real Madrid (Spain) | 1–0 | (England) Manchester City |
|---|---|---|
| Fernando 20' (o.g.) | Report |

Santiago Bernabéu, Madrid
Attendance: 78,300
Referee: Damir Skomina (Slovenia)

Real Madrid won 1–0 on aggregate.

27 April 2016
20:45

| Atlético Madrid (Spain) | 1–0 | (Germany) Bayern Munich |
|---|---|---|
| Saúl 11' | Report |

Vicente Calderón, Madrid
Attendance: 52,127
Referee: Mark Clattenburg (England)
3 May 2016
20:45

| Bayern Munich (Germany) | 2–1 | (Spain) Atlético Madrid |
|---|---|---|
| Alonso 31'; Lewandowski 74' | Report | Griezmann 54' |

Allianz Arena, Munich
Attendance: 70,000
Referee: Cüneyt Çakır (Turkey)

2–2 on aggregate; Atlético Madrid won on away goals.

== Final ==
The final was played on 28 May 2016 at Stadio San Siro in Milan, Italy. The "home" team (for administrative purposes) was determined by an additional draw held after the semi-final draw.

28 May 2016
20:45

| Real Madrid (Spain) | 1–1 (a.e.t.) | (Spain) Atlético Madrid |
|---|---|---|
| Ramos 15' | Report | Carrasco 79' |
Penalties
| Vázquez (penalty scored); Marcelo (penalty scored); Bale (penalty scored); Ramos (penalty scored); Ronaldo (penalty scored) | 5–3 | (penalty scored) Griezmann; (penalty scored) Gabi; (penalty scored) Saúl; (penalty missed) Juanfran |

Stadio San Siro, Milan
Attendance: 71,942
Referee: Mark Clattenburg (England)
