= 2015–16 UEFA Champions League group stage =

International football competition

The 2015–16 UEFA Champions League group stage began on 15 September and ended on 9 December 2015. A total of 32 teams competed in the group stage to decide the 16 places in the knockout phase of the 2015–16 UEFA Champions League.

== Draw ==
The draw was held on 27 August 2015, 17:45 CEST, at the Grimaldi Forum in Monaco. The 32 teams were drawn into eight groups of four, with the restriction that teams from the same association could not be drawn against each other. For the draw, the teams were seeded into four pots based on the following principles (introduced starting this season):

- Pot 1 contained the title holders and the champions of the top seven associations based on their 2014 UEFA country coefficients. As the title holders (Barcelona) were one of the champions of the top seven associations, the champions of the association ranked eighth were also seeded into Pot 1 (regulations Article 13.05).
- Pots 2, 3 and 4 contained the remaining teams, seeded based on their 2015 UEFA club coefficients.

Moreover, the draw was controlled for teams from the same association in order to split the teams evenly into the two sets of groups (A–D, E–H) for maximum television coverage.

The fixtures were decided after the draw. On each matchday, four groups played their matches on Tuesday, while the other four groups played their matches on Wednesday, with the two sets of groups (A–D, E–H) alternating between each matchday. There were other restrictions: for example, teams from the same city (e.g., Real Madrid and Atlético Madrid, Chelsea and Arsenal, Manchester City and Manchester United) in general did not play at home on the same matchday (UEFA tried to avoid teams from the same city playing at home on the same day or on consecutive days, due to logistics and crowd control), and teams in certain countries (e.g., Belarus, Russia, Kazakhstan) did not play at home on the last matchday (due to cold weather and simultaneous kick-off times).

On 17 July 2014, the UEFA emergency panel ruled that Ukrainian and Russian clubs would not be drawn against each other "until further notice" due to the political unrest between the countries. Therefore, Ukrainian clubs Shakhtar Donetsk and Dynamo Kyiv (both Pot 3), and Russian clubs Zenit Saint Petersburg (Pot 1) and CSKA Moscow (Pot 3) could not be drawn into the same group.

== Teams ==
Below are the 32 teams which qualified for the group stage (with their 2015 UEFA club coefficients), grouped by their seeding pot. They include 22 teams which entered in this stage, and the 10 winners of the play-off round (5 in Champions Route, 5 in League Route).

Key to colours
Group winners and runners-up advanced to the round of 16
Third-placed teams entered the Europa League round of 32

Pot 1 (by association rank)
Assoc.	Team	Notes	Coeff
1	(Spain) Barcelona		164.999
2	(England) Chelsea		142.078
3	(Germany) Bayern Munich		154.883
4	(Italy) Juventus		95.102
5	(Portugal) Benfica		118.276
6	(France) Paris Saint-Germain		100.483
7	(Russia) Zenit Saint Petersburg		90.099
8	(Netherlands) PSV Eindhoven		58.195

Pot 2
Team	Notes	Coeff
(Spain) Real Madrid		171.999
(Spain) Atlético Madrid		120.999
(Portugal) Porto		111.276
(England) Arsenal		110.078
(England) Manchester United		103.078
(Spain) Valencia		99.999
(Germany) Bayer Leverkusen		87.883
(England) Manchester City		87.078

Pot 3
Team	Notes	Coeff
(Ukraine) Shakhtar Donetsk		86.033
(Spain) Sevilla		80.499
(France) Lyon		72.983
(Ukraine) Dynamo Kyiv		65.033
(Greece) Olympiacos		62.380
(Russia) CSKA Moscow		55.599
(Turkey) Galatasaray		50.020
(Italy) Roma		43.602

Pot 4
Team	Notes	Coeff
(Belarus) BATE Borisov		35.150
(Germany) Borussia Mönchengladbach		33.883
(Germany) VfL Wolfsburg		31.883
(Croatia) Dinamo Zagreb		24.700
(Israel) Maccabi Tel Aviv		18.200
(Belgium) Gent		13.440
(Sweden) Malmö FF		12.545
(Kazakhstan) Astana		3.825

Notes

1. ^{TH} Title holders, automatically placed at the top position of seeding list.
2. ^{EL} Europa League title holders, qualified automatically
3. ^{CR} Winners of the play-off round (Champions Route).
4. ^{LR} Winners of the play-off round (League Route).

== Format ==
In each group, teams played against each other home-and-away in a round-robin format. The group winners and runners-up advanced to the round of 16, while the third-placed teams entered the Europa League round of 32.

=== Tiebreakers ===
The teams were ranked according to points (3 points for a win, 1 point for a draw, 0 points for a loss). If two or more teams were equal on points on completion of the group matches, the following criteria were applied in the order given to determine the rankings (regulations Article 17.01):

1. higher number of points obtained in the group matches played among the teams in question;
2. superior goal difference from the group matches played among the teams in question;
3. higher number of goals scored in the group matches played among the teams in question;
4. higher number of goals scored away from home in the group matches played among the teams in question;
5. if, after having applied criteria 1 to 4, teams still had an equal ranking, criteria 1 to 4 were reapplied exclusively to the matches between the teams in question to determine their final rankings. If this procedure did not lead to a decision, criteria 6 to 12 applied;
6. superior goal difference in all group matches;
7. higher number of goals scored in all group matches;
8. higher number of away goals scored in all group matches;
9. higher number of wins in all group matches;
10. higher number of away wins in all group matches;
11. lower disciplinary points total based only on yellow and red cards received in all group matches (red card = 3 points, yellow card = 1 point, expulsion for two yellow cards in one match = 3 points);
12. higher club coefficient.

== Groups ==
The matchdays were 15–16 September, 29–30 September, 20–21 October, 3–4 November, 24–25 November, and 8–9 December 2015. The match kickoff times were 20:45 CEST/CET, except for matchday 5 in Belarus and Russia and matchday 2 in Kazakhstan which were 18:00 CEST/CET, and matchdays 4 and 5 in Kazakhstan which were 16:00 CET.

Times are CET/CEST, (Note: CET (UTC+1) for matches from 2 November 2015, and CEST (UTC+2) for matches to 22 October 2015.) as listed by UEFA (local times, if different, are in parentheses).

=== Group A ===
Pos	Team	Pld	W	D	L	GF	GA	GD	Pts	Qualification	RMA	PAR	SHK	MAL
1	(Spain) Real Madrid	6	5	1	0	19	3	+16	16	Advance to knockout phase	—	1–0	4–0	8–0
2	(France) Paris Saint-Germain	6	4	1	1	12	1	+11	13	Advance to knockout phase	0–0	—	2–0	2–0
3	(Ukraine) Shakhtar Donetsk	6	1	0	5	7	14	−7	3	Transfer to Europa League	3–4	0–3	—	4–0
4	(Sweden) Malmö FF	6	1	0	5	1	21	−20	3		0–2	0–5	1–0	—

Source: UEFA
Rules for classification: Group stage tiebreakers
15 September 2015
20:45

Paris Saint-Germain (France)	2–0	(Sweden) Malmö FF
Di María 4'; Cavani 61'	Report

Parc des Princes, Paris
Attendance: 46,612
Referee: Sergei Karasev (Russia)
15 September 2015
20:45

Real Madrid (Spain)	4–0	(Ukraine) Shakhtar Donetsk
Benzema 30'; Ronaldo 55' (pen.), 63' (pen.), 81'	Report

Santiago Bernabéu, Madrid
Attendance: 66,389
Referee: Ivan Bebek (Croatia)

30 September 2015
20:45 (21:45 UTC+3)

Shakhtar Donetsk (Ukraine)	0–3	(France) Paris Saint-Germain
	Report	Aurier 7'; David Luiz 23'; Srna 90' (o.g.)

Arena Lviv, Lviv (Note: Shakhtar Donetsk played their home matches at Arena Lviv, Lviv, instead of their regular stadium, the Donbas Arena in Donetsk, due to the war in Donbas.)
Attendance: 32,730
Referee: Deniz Aytekin (Germany)
30 September 2015
20:45

Malmö FF (Sweden)	0–2	(Spain) Real Madrid
	Report	Ronaldo 29', 90'

Swedbank Stadion, Malmö
Attendance: 20,500
Referee: Cüneyt Çakır (Turkey)

21 October 2015
20:45

Malmö FF (Sweden)	1–0	(Ukraine) Shakhtar Donetsk
Rosenberg 17'	Report

Swedbank Stadion, Malmö
Attendance: 20,500
Referee: Anastasios Sidiropoulos (Greece)
21 October 2015
20:45

Paris Saint-Germain (France)	0–0	(Spain) Real Madrid
	Report

Parc des Princes, Paris
Attendance: 46,858
Referee: Nicola Rizzoli (Italy)

3 November 2015
20:45 (21:45 UTC+2)

Shakhtar Donetsk (Ukraine)	4–0	(Sweden) Malmö FF
Hladkyy 29'; Srna 48' (pen.); Eduardo 55'; Teixeira 73'	Report

Arena Lviv, Lviv
Attendance: 23,712
Referee: Ovidiu Hațegan (Romania)
3 November 2015
20:45

Real Madrid (Spain)	1–0	(France) Paris Saint-Germain
Nacho 35'	Report

Santiago Bernabéu, Madrid
Attendance: 78,300
Referee: Mark Clattenburg (England)

25 November 2015
20:45

Malmö FF (Sweden)	0–5	(France) Paris Saint-Germain
	Report	Rabiot 3'; Di María 14', 68'; Ibrahimović 50'; Lucas 82'

Swedbank Stadion, Malmö
Attendance: 20,500
Referee: Willie Collum (Scotland)
25 November 2015
20:45 (21:45 UTC+2)

Shakhtar Donetsk (Ukraine)	3–4	(Spain) Real Madrid
Teixeira 77' (pen.), 88'; Dentinho 83'	Report	Ronaldo 18', 70'; Modrić 50'; Carvajal 52'

Arena Lviv, Lviv
Attendance: 33,990
Referee: Bas Nijhuis (Netherlands)

8 December 2015
20:45

Paris Saint-Germain (France)	2–0	(Ukraine) Shakhtar Donetsk
Lucas 57'; Ibrahimović 86'	Report

Parc des Princes, Paris
Attendance: 44,408
Referee: Anthony Taylor (England)
8 December 2015
20:45

Real Madrid (Spain)	8–0	(Sweden) Malmö FF
Benzema 12', 24', 74'; Ronaldo 39', 47', 50', 59'; Kovačić 70'	Report

Santiago Bernabéu, Madrid
Attendance: 60,663
Referee: Daniele Orsato (Italy)

=== Group B ===
Pos	Team	Pld	W	D	L	GF	GA	GD	Pts	Qualification	WOL	PSV	MUN	CSKA
1	(Germany) VfL Wolfsburg	6	4	0	2	9	6	+3	12	Advance to knockout phase	—	2–0	3–2	1–0
2	(Netherlands) PSV Eindhoven	6	3	1	2	8	7	+1	10	Advance to knockout phase	2–0	—	2–1	2–1
3	(England) Manchester United	6	2	2	2	7	7	0	8	Transfer to Europa League	2–1	0–0	—	1–0
4	(Russia) CSKA Moscow	6	1	1	4	5	9	−4	4		0–2	3–2	1–1	—

Source: UEFA
Rules for classification: Group stage tiebreakers
15 September 2015
20:45

VfL Wolfsburg (Germany)	1–0	(Russia) CSKA Moscow
Draxler 40'	Report

Volkswagen Arena, Wolfsburg
Attendance: 20,126
Referee: Svein Oddvar Moen (Norway)
15 September 2015
20:45

PSV Eindhoven (Netherlands)	2–1	(England) Manchester United
Moreno 45+2'; Narsingh 57'	Report	Depay 41'

Philips Stadion, Eindhoven
Attendance: 35,292
Referee: Nicola Rizzoli (Italy)

30 September 2015
20:45 (19:45 UTC+1)

Manchester United (England)	2–1	(Germany) VfL Wolfsburg
Mata 34' (pen.); Smalling 53'	Report	Caligiuri 4'

Old Trafford, Manchester
Attendance: 74,811
Referee: Viktor Kassai (Hungary)
30 September 2015
20:45 (21:45 UTC+3)

CSKA Moscow (Russia)	3–2	(Netherlands) PSV Eindhoven
Musa 7'; Doumbia 21', 36' (pen.)	Report	Lestienne 60', 68'

Arena Khimki, Khimki
Attendance: 16,152
Referee: Ruddy Buquet (France)

21 October 2015
20:45 (21:45 UTC+3)

CSKA Moscow (Russia)	1–1	(England) Manchester United
Doumbia 15'	Report	Martial 65'

Arena Khimki, Khimki
Attendance: 18,456
Referee: Carlos Velasco Carballo (Spain)
21 October 2015
20:45

VfL Wolfsburg (Germany)	2–0	(Netherlands) PSV Eindhoven
Dost 46'; Kruse 57'	Report

Volkswagen Arena, Wolfsburg
Attendance: 23,375
Referee: Alberto Undiano Mallenco (Spain)

3 November 2015
20:45 (19:45 UTC+0)

Manchester United (England)	1–0	(Russia) CSKA Moscow
Rooney 79'	Report

Old Trafford, Manchester
Attendance: 75,165
Referee: Szymon Marciniak (Poland)
3 November 2015
20:45

PSV Eindhoven (Netherlands)	2–0	(Germany) VfL Wolfsburg
Locadia 55'; De Jong 86'	Report

Philips Stadion, Eindhoven
Attendance: 35,000
Referee: Jonas Eriksson (Sweden)

25 November 2015
18:00 (20:00 UTC+3)

CSKA Moscow (Russia)	0–2	(Germany) VfL Wolfsburg
	Report	Akinfeev 67' (o.g.); Schürrle 88'

Arena Khimki, Khimki
Attendance: 16,450
Referee: Gianluca Rocchi (Italy)
25 November 2015
20:45 (19:45 UTC+0)

Manchester United (England)	0–0	(Netherlands) PSV Eindhoven
	Report

Old Trafford, Manchester
Attendance: 75,321
Referee: Pavel Královec (Czech Republic)

8 December 2015
20:45

VfL Wolfsburg (Germany)	3–2	(England) Manchester United
Naldo 13', 84'; Vieirinha 29'	Report	Martial 10'; Guilavogui 82' (o.g.)

Volkswagen Arena, Wolfsburg
Attendance: 26,400
Referee: Milorad Mažić (Serbia)
8 December 2015
20:45

PSV Eindhoven (Netherlands)	2–1	(Russia) CSKA Moscow
De Jong 78'; Pröpper 86'	Report	Ignashevich 76' (pen.)

Philips Stadion, Eindhoven
Attendance: 34,000
Referee: David Fernández Borbalán (Spain)

=== Group C ===
Pos	Team	Pld	W	D	L	GF	GA	GD	Pts	Qualification	ATM	BEN	GAL	AST
1	(Spain) Atlético Madrid	6	4	1	1	11	3	+8	13	Advance to knockout phase	—	1–2	2–0	4–0
2	(Portugal) Benfica	6	3	1	2	10	8	+2	10	Advance to knockout phase	1–2	—	2–1	2–0
3	(Turkey) Galatasaray	6	1	2	3	6	10	−4	5	Transfer to Europa League	0–2	2–1	—	1–1
4	(Kazakhstan) Astana	6	0	4	2	5	11	−6	4		0–0	2–2	2–2	—

Source: UEFA
Rules for classification: Group stage tiebreakers
15 September 2015
20:45 (21:45 UTC+3)

Galatasaray (Turkey)	0–2	(Spain) Atlético Madrid
	Report	Griezmann 18', 25'

Türk Telekom Arena, Istanbul
Attendance: 33,469
Referee: Szymon Marciniak (Poland)
15 September 2015
20:45 (19:45 UTC+1)

Benfica (Portugal)	2–0	(Kazakhstan) Astana
Gaitán 51'; Mitroglou 62'	Report

Estádio da Luz, Lisbon
Attendance: 32,799
Referee: Anastasios Sidiropoulos (Greece)

30 September 2015
18:00 (22:00 UTC+6)

Astana (Kazakhstan)	2–2	(Turkey) Galatasaray
Balta 77' (o.g.); Carole 89' (o.g.)	Report	Kısa 31'; Erić 86' (o.g.)

Astana Arena, Astana
Attendance: 27,264
Referee: Martin Strömbergsson (Sweden)
30 September 2015
20:45

Atlético Madrid (Spain)	1–2	(Portugal) Benfica
Correa 23'	Report	Gaitán 36'; Guedes 51'

Vicente Calderón, Madrid
Attendance: 40,938
Referee: Gianluca Rocchi (Italy)

21 October 2015
20:45

Atlético Madrid (Spain)	4–0	(Kazakhstan) Astana
Saúl 23'; Martínez 29'; Ó. Torres 63'; Dedechko 89' (o.g.)	Report

Vicente Calderón, Madrid
Attendance: 33,853
Referee: Aleksei Kulbakov (Belarus)
21 October 2015
20:45 (21:45 UTC+3)

Galatasaray (Turkey)	2–1	(Portugal) Benfica
İnan 19' (pen.); Podolski 33'	Report	Gaitán 2'

Türk Telekom Arena, Istanbul
Attendance: 33,615
Referee: Willie Collum (Scotland)

3 November 2015
16:00 (21:00 UTC+6)

Astana (Kazakhstan)	0–0	(Spain) Atlético Madrid
	Report

Astana Arena, Astana
Attendance: 29,231
Referee: Anthony Taylor (England)
3 November 2015
20:45 (19:45 UTC+0)

Benfica (Portugal)	2–1	(Turkey) Galatasaray
Jonas 52'; Luisão 67'	Report	Podolski 58'

Estádio da Luz, Lisbon
Attendance: 35,726
Referee: Milorad Mažić (Serbia)

25 November 2015
16:00 (21:00 UTC+6)

Astana (Kazakhstan)	2–2	(Portugal) Benfica
Twumasi 19'; Aničić 31'	Report	Jiménez 40', 72'

Astana Arena, Astana
Attendance: 15,089
Referee: Ruddy Buquet (France)
25 November 2015
20:45

Atlético Madrid (Spain)	2–0	(Turkey) Galatasaray
Griezmann 13', 65'	Report

Vicente Calderón, Madrid
Attendance: 35,753
Referee: Nicola Rizzoli (Italy)

8 December 2015
20:45 (21:45 UTC+2)

Galatasaray (Turkey)	1–1	(Kazakhstan) Astana
İnan 64'	Report	Twumasi 62'

Türk Telekom Arena, Istanbul
Attendance: 26,464
Referee: Craig Thomson (Scotland)
8 December 2015
20:45 (19:45 UTC+0)

Benfica (Portugal)	1–2	(Spain) Atlético Madrid
Mitroglou 75'	Report	Saúl 33'; Vietto 55'

Estádio da Luz, Lisbon
Attendance: 47,630
Referee: Ovidiu Hațegan (Romania)

=== Group D ===
Pos	Team	Pld	W	D	L	GF	GA	GD	Pts	Qualification	MCI	JUV	SEV	BMG
1	(England) Manchester City	6	4	0	2	12	8	+4	12	Advance to knockout phase	—	1–2	2–1	4–2
2	(Italy) Juventus	6	3	2	1	6	3	+3	11	Advance to knockout phase	1–0	—	2–0	0–0
3	(Spain) Sevilla	6	2	0	4	8	11	−3	6	Transfer to Europa League	1–3	1–0	—	3–0
4	(Germany) Borussia Mönchengladbach	6	1	2	3	8	12	−4	5		1–2	1–1	4–2	—

Source: UEFA
Rules for classification: Group stage tiebreakers
15 September 2015
20:45 (19:45 UTC+1)

Manchester City (England)	1–2	(Italy) Juventus
Chiellini 57' (o.g.)	Report	Mandžukić 70'; Morata 81'

City of Manchester Stadium, Manchester
Attendance: 50,363
Referee: Damir Skomina (Slovenia)
15 September 2015
20:45

Sevilla (Spain)	3–0	(Germany) Borussia Mönchengladbach
Gameiro 47' (pen.); Banega 66' (pen.); Konoplyanka 84'	Report

Ramón Sánchez Pizjuán, Seville
Attendance: 36,959
Referee: Pavel Královec (Czech Republic)

30 September 2015
20:45

Borussia Mönchengladbach (Germany)	1–2	(England) Manchester City
Stindl 54'	Report	Demichelis 65'; Agüero 90' (pen.)

Stadion im Borussia-Park, Mönchengladbach
Attendance: 46,217
Referee: Clément Turpin (France)
30 September 2015
20:45

Juventus (Italy)	2–0	(Spain) Sevilla
Morata 41'; Zaza 87'	Report

Juventus Stadium, Turin
Attendance: 36,499
Referee: Jonas Eriksson (Sweden)

21 October 2015
20:45

Juventus (Italy)	0–0	(Germany) Borussia Mönchengladbach
	Report

Juventus Stadium, Turin
Attendance: 40,940
Referee: Craig Thomson (Scotland)
21 October 2015
20:45 (19:45 UTC+1)

Manchester City (England)	2–1	(Spain) Sevilla
Rami 36' (o.g.); De Bruyne 90+1'	Report	Konoplyanka 30'

City of Manchester Stadium, Manchester
Attendance: 45,595
Referee: Bas Nijhuis (Netherlands)

3 November 2015
20:45

Borussia Mönchengladbach (Germany)	1–1	(Italy) Juventus
Johnson 18'	Report	Lichtsteiner 44'

Stadion im Borussia-Park, Mönchengladbach
Attendance: 46,217
Referee: Björn Kuipers (Netherlands)
3 November 2015
20:45

Sevilla (Spain)	1–3	(England) Manchester City
Trémoulinas 25'	Report	Sterling 8'; Fernandinho 11'; Bony 36'

Ramón Sánchez Pizjuán, Seville
Attendance: 39,261
Referee: Svein Oddvar Moen (Norway)

25 November 2015
20:45

Juventus (Italy)	1–0	(England) Manchester City
Mandžukić 18'	Report

Juventus Stadium, Turin
Attendance: 38,193
Referee: Felix Brych (Germany)
25 November 2015
20:45

Borussia Mönchengladbach (Germany)	4–2	(Spain) Sevilla
Stindl 29', 83'; Johnson 68'; Raffael 78'	Report	Vitolo 82'; Banega 90+1' (pen.)

Stadion im Borussia-Park, Mönchengladbach
Attendance: 45,177
Referee: Damir Skomina (Slovenia)

8 December 2015
20:45 (19:45 UTC+0)

Manchester City (England)	4–2	(Germany) Borussia Mönchengladbach
Silva 16'; Sterling 80', 81'; Bony 85'	Report	Korb 19'; Raffael 42'

City of Manchester Stadium, Manchester
Attendance: 41,829
Referee: Danny Makkelie (Netherlands)
8 December 2015
20:45

Sevilla (Spain)	1–0	(Italy) Juventus
Llorente 65'	Report

Ramón Sánchez Pizjuán, Seville
Attendance: 35,583
Referee: Szymon Marciniak (Poland)

=== Group E ===
Pos	Team	Pld	W	D	L	GF	GA	GD	Pts	Qualification	BAR	ROM	LEV	BATE
1	(Spain) Barcelona	6	4	2	0	15	4	+11	14	Advance to knockout phase	—	6–1	2–1	3–0
2	(Italy) Roma	6	1	3	2	11	16	−5	6	Advance to knockout phase	1–1	—	3–2	0–0
3	(Germany) Bayer Leverkusen	6	1	3	2	13	12	+1	6	Transfer to Europa League	1–1	4–4	—	4–1
4	(Belarus) BATE Borisov	6	1	2	3	5	12	−7	5		0–2	3–2	1–1	—

Source: UEFA
Rules for classification: Group stage tiebreakers
16 September 2015
20:45

Bayer Leverkusen (Germany)	4–1	(Belarus) BATE Borisov
Mehmedi 4'; Çalhanoğlu 47', 76' (pen.); Hernández 59'	Report	Milunović 13'

BayArena, Leverkusen
Attendance: 24,280
Referee: Danny Makkelie (Netherlands)
16 September 2015
20:45

Roma (Italy)	1–1	(Spain) Barcelona
Florenzi 31'	Report	Suárez 21'

Stadio Olimpico, Rome
Attendance: 57,836
Referee: Björn Kuipers (Netherlands)

29 September 2015
20:45

Barcelona (Spain)	2–1	(Germany) Bayer Leverkusen
Roberto 80'; Suárez 82'	Report	Papadopoulos 22'

Camp Nou, Barcelona
Attendance: 68,694
Referee: Martin Atkinson (England)
29 September 2015
20:45 (21:45 UTC+3)

BATE Borisov (Belarus)	3–2	(Italy) Roma
Stasevich 8'; Mladenović 12', 30'	Report	Gervinho 66'; Torosidis 82'

Borisov Arena, Barysaw
Attendance: 12,767
Referee: Mark Clattenburg (England)

20 October 2015
20:45 (21:45 UTC+3)

BATE Borisov (Belarus)	0–2	(Spain) Barcelona
	Report	Rakitić 48', 64'

Borisov Arena, Barysaw
Attendance: 13,074
Referee: Jorge Sousa (Portugal)
20 October 2015
20:45

Bayer Leverkusen (Germany)	4–4	(Italy) Roma
Hernández 4' (pen.), 19'; Kampl 84'; Mehmedi 86'	Report	De Rossi 29', 38'; Pjanić 54'; Falque 73'

BayArena, Leverkusen
Attendance: 29,412
Referee: Viktor Kassai (Hungary)

4 November 2015
20:45

Barcelona (Spain)	3–0	(Belarus) BATE Borisov
Neymar 30' (pen.), 83'; Suárez 60'	Report

Camp Nou, Barcelona
Attendance: 68,502
Referee: István Vad (Hungary)
4 November 2015
20:45

Roma (Italy)	3–2	(Germany) Bayer Leverkusen
Salah 2'; Džeko 29'; Pjanić 80' (pen.)	Report	Mehmedi 46'; Hernández 51'

Stadio Olimpico, Rome
Attendance: 38,361
Referee: Sergei Karasev (Russia)

24 November 2015
18:00 (20:00 UTC+3)

BATE Borisov (Belarus)	1–1	(Germany) Bayer Leverkusen
Gordeichuk 2'	Report	Mehmedi 68'

Borisov Arena, Barysaw
Attendance: 12,601
Referee: Clément Turpin (France)
24 November 2015
20:45

Barcelona (Spain)	6–1	(Italy) Roma
Suárez 15', 44'; Messi 18', 60'; Piqué 56'; Adriano 77'	Report	Džeko 90+1'

Camp Nou, Barcelona
Attendance: 71,433
Referee: Cüneyt Çakır (Turkey)

9 December 2015
20:45

Bayer Leverkusen (Germany)	1–1	(Spain) Barcelona
Hernández 23'	Report	Messi 20'

BayArena, Leverkusen
Attendance: 29,412
Referee: Mark Clattenburg (England)
9 December 2015
20:45

Roma (Italy)	0–0	(Belarus) BATE Borisov
	Report

Stadio Olimpico, Rome
Attendance: 29,489
Referee: Martin Atkinson (England)

=== Group F ===
Pos	Team	Pld	W	D	L	GF	GA	GD	Pts	Qualification	BAY	ARS	OLY	DZG
1	(Germany) Bayern Munich	6	5	0	1	19	3	+16	15	Advance to knockout phase	—	5–1	4–0	5–0
2	(England) Arsenal	6	3	0	3	12	10	+2	9	Advance to knockout phase	2–0	—	2–3	3–0
3	(Greece) Olympiacos	6	3	0	3	6	13	−7	9	Transfer to Europa League	0–3	0–3	—	2–1
4	(Croatia) Dinamo Zagreb	6	1	0	5	3	14	−11	3		0–2	2–1	0–1	—

Source: UEFA
Rules for classification: Group stage tiebreakers
16 September 2015
20:45

Dinamo Zagreb (Croatia)	2–1	(England) Arsenal
Pivarić 24'; Fernandes 58'	Report	Walcott 79'

Stadion Maksimir, Zagreb
Attendance: 17,840
Referee: Ovidiu Hațegan (Romania)
16 September 2015
20:45 (21:45 UTC+3)

Olympiacos (Greece)	0–3	(Germany) Bayern Munich
	Report	Müller 52', 90+2' (pen.); Götze 89'

Karaiskakis Stadium, Piraeus
Attendance: 31,688
Referee: Carlos Velasco Carballo (Spain)

29 September 2015
20:45

Bayern Munich (Germany)	5–0	(Croatia) Dinamo Zagreb
Douglas Costa 13'; Lewandowski 21', 28', 55'; Götze 25'	Report

Allianz Arena, Munich
Attendance: 70,000
Referee: Aleksei Kulbakov (Belarus)
29 September 2015
20:45 (19:45 UTC+1)

Arsenal (England)	2–3	(Greece) Olympiacos
Walcott 35'; Sánchez 65'	Report	Pardo 33'; Ospina 40' (o.g.); Finnbogason 66'

Emirates Stadium, London
Attendance: 59,428
Referee: Bas Nijhuis (Netherlands)

20 October 2015
20:45 (19:45 UTC+1)

Arsenal (England)	2–0	(Germany) Bayern Munich
Giroud 77'; Özil 90+4'	Report

Emirates Stadium, London
Attendance: 49,824
Referee: Cüneyt Çakır (Turkey)
20 October 2015
20:45

Dinamo Zagreb (Croatia)	0–1	(Greece) Olympiacos
	Report	Ideye 79'

Stadion Maksimir, Zagreb
Attendance: 13,678
Referee: Paolo Tagliavento (Italy)

4 November 2015
20:45

Bayern Munich (Germany)	5–1	(England) Arsenal
Lewandowski 10'; Müller 29', 89'; Alaba 44'; Robben 55'	Report	Giroud 69'

Allianz Arena, Munich
Attendance: 70,000
Referee: Gianluca Rocchi (Italy)
4 November 2015
20:45 (21:45 UTC+2)

Olympiacos (Greece)	2–1	(Croatia) Dinamo Zagreb
Pardo 65', 90'	Report	Hodžić 21'

Karaiskakis Stadium, Piraeus
Attendance: 31,473
Referee: Antonio Mateu Lahoz (Spain)

24 November 2015
20:45 (19:45 UTC+0)

Arsenal (England)	3–0	(Croatia) Dinamo Zagreb
Özil 29'; Sánchez 33', 69'	Report

Emirates Stadium, London
Attendance: 58,978
Referee: Viktor Kassai (Hungary)
24 November 2015
20:45

Bayern Munich (Germany)	4–0	(Greece) Olympiacos
Douglas Costa 8'; Lewandowski 16'; Müller 20'; Coman 69'	Report

Allianz Arena, Munich
Attendance: 70,000
Referee: Jonas Eriksson (Sweden)

9 December 2015
20:45

Dinamo Zagreb (Croatia)	0–2	(Germany) Bayern Munich
	Report	Lewandowski 61', 64'

Stadion Maksimir, Zagreb
Attendance: 19,681
Referee: Martin Strömbergsson (Sweden)
9 December 2015
20:45 (21:45 UTC+2)

Olympiacos (Greece)	0–3	(England) Arsenal
	Report	Giroud 29', 49', 67' (pen.)

Karaiskakis Stadium, Piraeus
Attendance: 31,388
Referee: Nicola Rizzoli (Italy)

=== Group G ===
Pos	Team	Pld	W	D	L	GF	GA	GD	Pts	Qualification	CHE	DKV	POR	MTA
1	(England) Chelsea	6	4	1	1	13	3	+10	13	Advance to knockout phase	—	2–1	2–0	4–0
2	(Ukraine) Dynamo Kyiv	6	3	2	1	8	4	+4	11	Advance to knockout phase	0–0	—	2–2	1–0
3	(Portugal) Porto	6	3	1	2	9	8	+1	10	Transfer to Europa League	2–1	0–2	—	2–0
4	(Israel) Maccabi Tel Aviv	6	0	0	6	1	16	−15	0		0–4	0–2	1–3	—

Source: UEFA
Rules for classification: Group stage tiebreakers
16 September 2015
20:45 (21:45 UTC+3)

Dynamo Kyiv (Ukraine)	2–2	(Portugal) Porto
Husyev 20'; Buyalskyi 89'	Report	Aboubakar 23', 81'

Olympic Stadium, Kyiv
Attendance: 52,369
Referee: Felix Brych (Germany)
16 September 2015
20:45 (19:45 UTC+1)

Chelsea (England)	4–0	(Israel) Maccabi Tel Aviv
Willian 15'; Oscar 45+4' (pen.); Costa 58'; Fàbregas 78'	Report

Stamford Bridge, London
Attendance: 40,684
Referee: Felix Zwayer (Germany)

29 September 2015
20:45 (21:45 UTC+3)

Maccabi Tel Aviv (Israel)	0–2	(Ukraine) Dynamo Kyiv
	Report	Yarmolenko 4'; Moraes 50'

Sammy Ofer Stadium, Haifa (Note: Maccabi Tel Aviv played their home matches at Sammy Ofer Stadium, Haifa, instead of their regular stadium, Bloomfield Stadium, Tel Aviv.)
Attendance: 27,100
Referee: David Fernández Borbalán (Spain)
29 September 2015
20:45 (19:45 UTC+1)

Porto (Portugal)	2–1	(England) Chelsea
André 39'; Maicon 52'	Report	Willian 45+2'

Estádio do Dragão, Porto
Attendance: 46,120
Referee: Antonio Mateu Lahoz (Spain)

20 October 2015
20:45 (19:45 UTC+1)

Porto (Portugal)	2–0	(Israel) Maccabi Tel Aviv
Aboubakar 37'; Brahimi 41'	Report

Estádio do Dragão, Porto
Attendance: 35,209
Referee: Clément Turpin (France)
20 October 2015
20:45 (21:45 UTC+3)

Dynamo Kyiv (Ukraine)	0–0	(England) Chelsea
	Report

Olympic Stadium, Kyiv
Attendance: 60,291
Referee: Damir Skomina (Slovenia)

4 November 2015
20:45 (21:45 UTC+2)

Maccabi Tel Aviv (Israel)	1–3	(Portugal) Porto
Zahavi 75' (pen.)	Report	Tello 19'; André 49'; Layún 72'

Sammy Ofer Stadium, Haifa
Attendance: 26,646
Referee: Anastasios Sidiropoulos (Greece)
4 November 2015
20:45 (19:45 UTC+0)

Chelsea (England)	2–1	(Ukraine) Dynamo Kyiv
Dragović 34' (o.g.); Willian 83'	Report	Dragović 78'

Stamford Bridge, London
Attendance: 41,241
Referee: Pavel Královec (Czech Republic)

24 November 2015
20:45 (19:45 UTC+0)

Porto (Portugal)	0–2	(Ukraine) Dynamo Kyiv
	Report	Yarmolenko 35' (pen.); González 64'

Estádio do Dragão, Porto
Attendance: 31,220
Referee: Carlos Velasco Carballo (Spain)
24 November 2015
20:45 (21:45 UTC+2)

Maccabi Tel Aviv (Israel)	0–4	(England) Chelsea
	Report	Cahill 20'; Willian 73'; Oscar 77'; Zouma 90+1'

Sammy Ofer Stadium, Haifa
Attendance: 29,121
Referee: Alberto Undiano Mallenco (Spain)

9 December 2015
20:45 (21:45 UTC+2)

Dynamo Kyiv (Ukraine)	1–0	(Israel) Maccabi Tel Aviv
Harmash 16'	Report

Olympic Stadium, Kyiv
Attendance: 475 (Note: The Dynamo Kyiv v Maccabi Tel Aviv match was played behind closed doors due to UEFA punishment.)
Referee: Björn Kuipers (Netherlands)
9 December 2015
20:45 (19:45 UTC+0)

Chelsea (England)	2–0	(Portugal) Porto
Marcano 12' (o.g.); Willian 52'	Report

Stamford Bridge, London
Attendance: 41,096
Referee: Cüneyt Çakır (Turkey)

=== Group H ===
Pos	Team	Pld	W	D	L	GF	GA	GD	Pts	Qualification	ZEN	GNT	VAL	LYO
1	(Russia) Zenit Saint Petersburg	6	5	0	1	13	6	+7	15	Advance to knockout phase	—	2–1	2–0	3–1
2	(Belgium) Gent	6	3	1	2	8	7	+1	10	Advance to knockout phase	2–1	—	1–0	1–1
3	(Spain) Valencia	6	2	0	4	5	9	−4	6	Transfer to Europa League	2–3	2–1	—	0–2
4	(France) Lyon	6	1	1	4	5	9	−4	4		0–2	1–2	0–1	—

Source: UEFA
Rules for classification: Group stage tiebreakers
16 September 2015
20:45

Valencia (Spain)	2–3	(Russia) Zenit Saint Petersburg
Cancelo 55'; Gomes 73'	Report	Hulk 9', 44'; Witsel 76'

Mestalla, Valencia
Attendance: 28,005
Referee: Craig Thomson (Scotland)
16 September 2015
20:45

Gent (Belgium)	1–1	(France) Lyon
Milićević 68'	Report	Jallet 58'

Ghelamco Arena, Ghent
Attendance: 19,601
Referee: Willie Collum (Scotland)

29 September 2015
20:45

Lyon (France)	0–1	(Spain) Valencia
	Report	Feghouli 42'

Stade de Gerland, Lyon
Attendance: 33,534
Referee: Milorad Mažić (Serbia)
29 September 2015
20:45 (21:45 UTC+3)

Zenit Saint Petersburg (Russia)	2–1	(Belgium) Gent
Dzyuba 35'; Shatov 67'	Report	Matton 56'

Petrovsky Stadium, Saint Petersburg
Attendance: 18,095
Referee: Matej Jug (Slovenia)

20 October 2015
20:45 (21:45 UTC+3)

Zenit Saint Petersburg (Russia)	3–1	(France) Lyon
Dzyuba 3'; Hulk 56'; Danny 82'	Report	Lacazette 49'

Petrovsky Stadium, Saint Petersburg
Attendance: 17,517
Referee: Martin Atkinson (England)
20 October 2015
20:45

Valencia (Spain)	2–1	(Belgium) Gent
Feghouli 15'; Mitrović 72' (o.g.)	Report	Foket 40'

Mestalla, Valencia
Attendance: 38,207
Referee: Felix Zwayer (Germany)

4 November 2015
20:45

Lyon (France)	0–2	(Russia) Zenit Saint Petersburg
	Report	Dzyuba 25', 57'

Stade de Gerland, Lyon
Attendance: 30,173
Referee: Felix Brych (Germany)
4 November 2015
20:45

Gent (Belgium)	1–0	(Spain) Valencia
Kums 49' (pen.)	Report

Ghelamco Arena, Ghent
Attendance: 19,452
Referee: Daniele Orsato (Italy)

24 November 2015
18:00 (20:00 UTC+3)

Zenit Saint Petersburg (Russia)	2–0	(Spain) Valencia
Shatov 15'; Dzyuba 74'	Report

Petrovsky Stadium, Saint Petersburg
Attendance: 17,002
Referee: Svein Oddvar Moen (Norway)
24 November 2015
20:45

Lyon (France)	1–2	(Belgium) Gent
Ferri 7'	Report	Milićević 32'; Coulibaly 90+5'

Stade de Gerland, Lyon
Attendance: 30,206
Referee: Sergei Karasev (Russia)

9 December 2015
20:45

Valencia (Spain)	0–2	(France) Lyon
	Report	Cornet 37'; Lacazette 76'

Mestalla, Valencia
Attendance: 32,494
Referee: Matej Jug (Slovenia)
9 December 2015
20:45

Gent (Belgium)	2–1	(Russia) Zenit Saint Petersburg
Depoitre 18'; Milićević 78'	Report	Dzyuba 65'

Ghelamco Arena, Ghent
Attendance: 19,978
Referee: Jorge Sousa (Portugal)
