= Cüneyt Çakır =

Turkish football referee

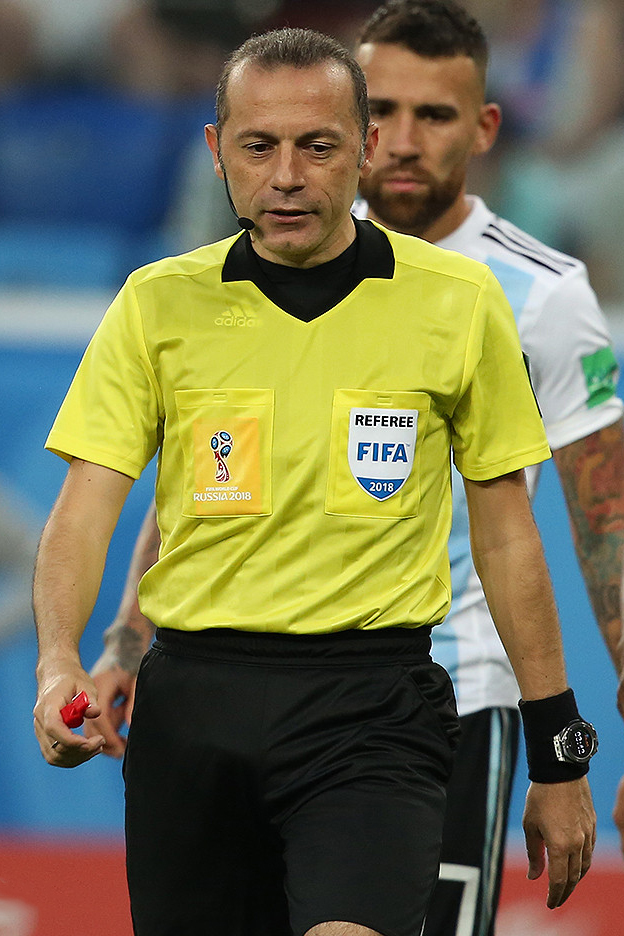
- Çakır refereeing in 2018
- Born: 23 November 1976 (age 49); Istanbul, Turkey
- Other occupation: Insurance agent

Domestic
| Years | League | Role |
| 2001–2022 | Süper Lig | Referee |

International
| Years | League | Role |
| 2006–2022 | FIFA listed | Referee |
| 2010–2022 | UEFA Elite | Referee |

Cüneyt Çakır (Turkish pronunciation: [ˈd͡ʒynejt ˈt͡ʃakɯɾ], born 23 November 1976) is a Turkish former football referee. He is best known for refereeing the 2015 UEFA Champions League Final between Juventus and Barcelona. He was FIFA listed since 2006 and a member of the UEFA Elite since 2010 until his retirement. He is currently serving as head of the Refereeing Department of the Georgian Football Federation.

== Honors and awards ==
Çakır was identified as the second best referee in the world by the International Federation of Football History and Statistics based on statistics from 2010–2020.

== Refereeing career ==
Çakır has refereed more than 250 matches including 12 Super Lig derbies, 5 of those being The Intercontinental Derby; between Fenerbahçe vs Galatasaray, and was selected for the UEFA European Under-21 Championship finals in Sweden in 2009, taking charge of three games including England's penalty shoot-out win against the hosts in the semi-finals.

He made his UEFA debut as the fourth official in the UEFA Champions League first qualifying round game between Skonto FC and Sliema Wanderers in July 2003. He took charge of two matches at the 2007 UEFA European Under-19 Championship in Austria and was also the referee for two UEFA Euro 2008 qualifying fixtures.

He made his international refereeing debut in the 2008–09 UEFA Cup, taking charge of two games including the group stage fixture between FC Twente and Schalke 04 in December 2008. He oversaw Fulham's second-leg win against Hamburger SV in the 2009–10 UEFA Europa League semi-finals, one of seven matches he refereed in total in the competition that season.

On 29 September 2010, Çakır made his debut in the Champions League Group Stage when he took charge of group D fixture between Rubin Kazan and Barcelona, ending in a 1–1 draw. He also took charge of the match between Chelsea F.C. and Spartak Moscow on 3 November 2010.

He has also refereed the UEFA Europa League Round of 32 match Manchester City-Dynamo Kyiv on 17 March 2011, which ended in a 1–0 win for Manchester City, but Dynamo Kyiv advanced to the next round after winning 2–1 on aggregate. In that game, Çakır sent off Mario Balotelli and dished out eight yellow cards. In August 2011, he officiated five games including semi-final between Portugal and France 2011 FIFA U-20 World Cup, hosted in Colombia.

On 24 April 2012, he officiated the Champions League semi final between FC Barcelona and Chelsea at Camp Nou, Barcelona. Çakır sent off John Terry in first half. Following a 2–2 draw, Chelsea advanced to the final 3–2 on aggregate.

Later that year, on 11 June, he officiated the Euro 2012 Group D Match between hosts Ukraine and Sweden, with the former side winning 2–1. On 18 June, he also officiated the final Euro 2012 group C match between Italy and Ireland where he was very precise when it came to ensuring the correct distance from the ball to the defenders' wall, though he also angered the Irish by sending off Keith Andrews one minute before the end of the game; Italy won the match 2–0 to advance to the knock-out stages at Ireland's expense. He was not selected to referee a quarter-final game but he was fourth official in the England vs. Italy quarter-final, in which the Italians prevailed on penalties after a goalless draw. On 27 June 2012, he officiated the semi-final match between Portugal and eventual champions Spain, with Spain also advancing to on penalties after a goalless draw. Çakır showed 9 yellow cards in this match in 120 minutes.

On 1 July 2012, he was appointed as fourth official in the Euro 2012 final, between Spain and Italy, which was played in Kyiv; the former team won 4–0. On 14 December 2012, he was appointed to referee the 2012 FIFA Club World Cup Final, between Corinthians and Chelsea, which was played in Yokohama. Corinthians won 1–0. Çakır sent off Gary Cahill in this game.

On 5 March 2013, Çakır officiated second leg of the round of 16 UEFA Champions League match between Manchester United and Real Madrid, and, in a controversial decision, sent off Manchester United player Nani during the second half of the match, a decision that enraged Alex Ferguson in what became his last Champions League game as United manager; Manchester United were leading 1–0 at the time, but eventually lost 2–1, with Real Madrid advancing to the next round 4–3 on aggregate.

On 9 July 2014, he refereed the 2014 FIFA World Cup semi-final match, between Netherlands and Argentina, which was played in São Paulo; Argentina advanced to the final on penalties after a goalless draw.

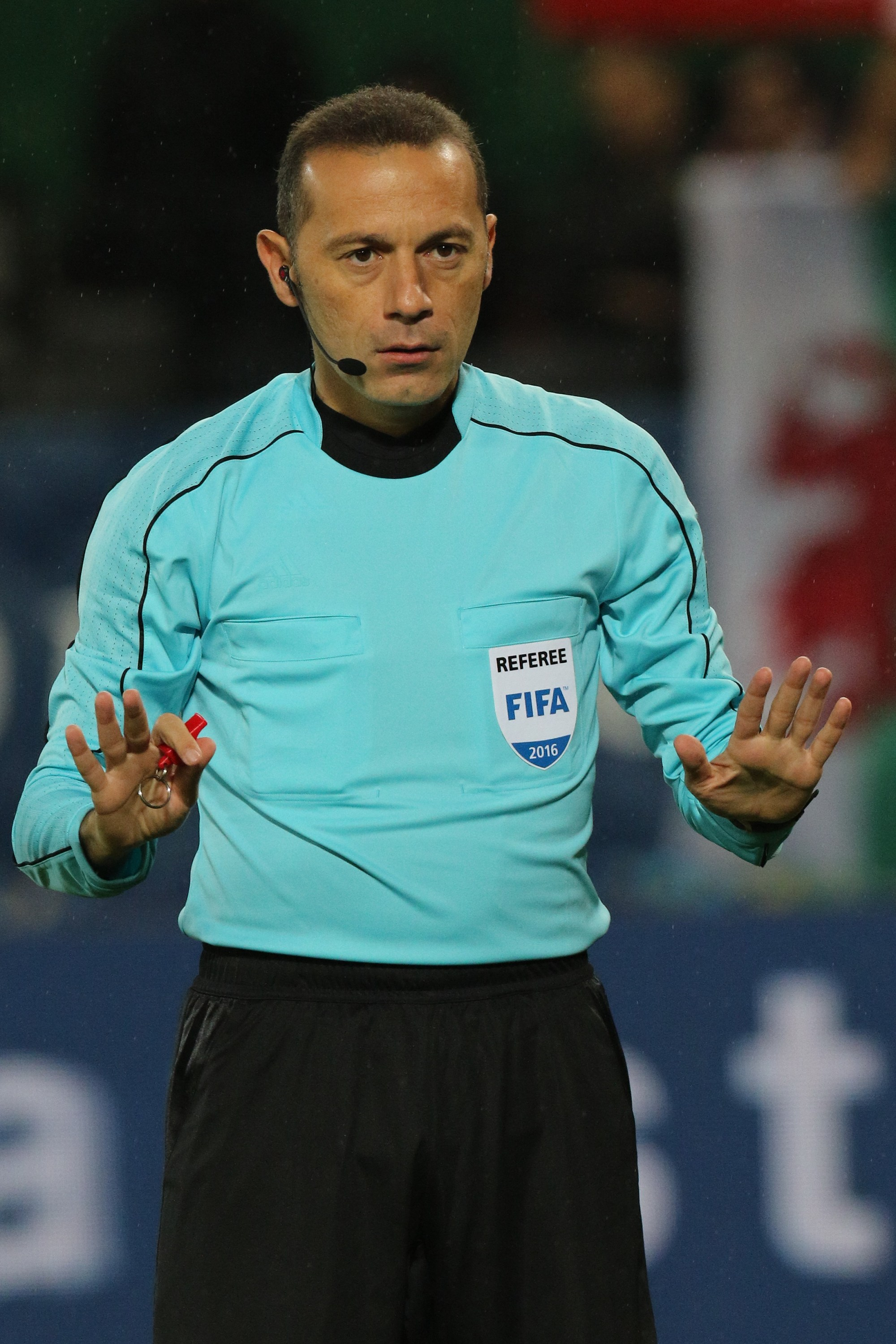
Çakır in October 2016

Çakır officiated the 2015 UEFA Champions League Final match between Juventus and Barcelona at Olympiastadion in Berlin, Germany on 6 June 2015 and showed his yellow card three times; he also disallowed a goal by Neymar in the second half for a handball. Barcelona won the match 3–1. In 2016, Çakır officiated two different semi-final matches in the 2015–16 UEFA Champions League, the first referee to do so. Çakır officiated the 2016–17 UEFA Champions League semi-final match between Atlético Madrid and Real Madrid at Vicente Calderón in Madrid, Spain on 10 May 2017.

In the 2017–18 UEFA Champions League, Çakır officiated the group stage match between Bayern Munich and Paris Saint-Germain in December 2017, as well as the round of 16 game between FC Barcelona and Chelsea at the Stamford Bridge on 20 February 2018. Later, he refereed the semifinal second leg match between Real Madrid and Bayern Munich in Madrid.

Çakır officiated the first round of the 2018–19 UEFA Champions League between Liverpool and Paris Saint-Germain. and the famous Liverpool F.C second-leg semi-final comeback against FC Barcelona of the 2018–19 season of the Champions League, in which Liverpool won 4–0 after losing the first leg 3–0.

On 5 August 2022, via the official website of the Turkish Football Association his retirement was announced; from now on, his role will consist in training young referees.

== FIFA World Cup matches ==
2014 FIFA World Cup – Brazil
| Date | Match | Venue | Round |
|---|---|---|---|
| 17 June 2014 | Brazil – Mexico | Fortaleza | Group stage |
| 26 June 2014 | Algeria – Russia | Curitiba | Group stage |
| 9 July 2014 | Netherlands – Argentina | São Paulo | Semi-Final |
2018 FIFA World Cup – Russia
| Date | Match | Venue | Round |
| 15 June 2018 | Morocco – Iran | Saint Petersburg | Group stage |
| 26 June 2018 | Nigeria – Argentina | Saint Petersburg | Group stage |
| 11 July 2018 | Croatia – England | Moscow | Semi-final |

== Major club matches refereed ==
| Date | Match | Tournament | Venue | Result | Ref |
|---|---|---|---|---|---|
| 16 December 2012 | Corinthians vs. Chelsea | 2012 FIFA Club World Cup final | International Stadium Yokohama, Yokohama | 1–0 | |
| 6 June 2015 | Juventus vs. Barcelona | 2015 UEFA Champions League final | Olympiastadion, Berlin | 1–3 | |
