= 2012–13 VfL Wolfsburg season =

VfL Wolfsburg
2012–13 season
- Manager: Dieter Hecking
- Stadium: Volkswagen Arena, Wolfsburg, Lower Saxony
- Bundesliga: 11th
- DFB-Pokal: Semi-finalist
- Top goalscorer: League: Bas Dost (8); All: Bas Dost (10)
Home colours	Away colours	Third colours

The 2012–13 VfL Wolfsburg season was the 68th season in the club's football history. In 2012–13 the club played in the Bundesliga, the top tier of German football. It was the club's 16th consecutive season in this league, having been promoted from the 2. Bundesliga in 1997.

The club also took part in the 2012–13 edition of the DFB-Pokal, the German Cup, where it reached the semi-finals before losing to eventual champion Bayern Munich.

== Matches ==
=== Legend ===
Win Draw Loss Postponed

=== Friendly matches ===
VfL Wolfsburg	2–1	Odense
		Schäfer; Lakić

Midtjylland	0–0	VfL Wolfsburg

Esbjerg	2–2	VfL Wolfsburg
		Polák; Jönsson

10 July 2012	FC St. Pauli	3–1	VfL Wolfsburg	Streichmühle
19:00

ETSV Weiche	0–2	VfL Wolfsburg
		Lakić; Dost

17 July 2012	Helmstedter SV	–	VfL Wolfsburg
19:00

Germania Egestorf	2–8	VfL Wolfsburg
Goal		Dost; Helmes; Hasani; Naldo; Kahlenberg; Medojević; Lakić

Germania Halberstadt	2–4	VfL Wolfsburg
Goal		Lakić; Dost; Helmes

26 July 2012 Audi Football Summit	Bayern Munich	2–1	VfL Wolfsburg	Guangdong Olympic Stadium
14:00 CEST	Mandžukić 29' (pen.); Robben 39'		Pilař 90+2'

Changchun Yatai F.C.	2–3	VfL Wolfsburg
Goal		Orozco; Jönsson; Dejagah

Shanghai Shenxin F.C.	1–0	VfL Wolfsburg
Goal

4 August 2012	VfL Wolfsburg	0–2	Manchester City	Wolfsburg, Germany
			Agüero 41'; Y. Touré 57'	Stadium: Volkswagen Arena

7 August 2012	Wolfsberger AC	1–0	VfL Wolfsburg
19:00	Goal

=== Bundesliga ===
25 August 2012 1	VfB Stuttgart	0–1	VfL Wolfsburg	Stuttgart
20:45		Report	90' Dost	Stadium: Mercedes-Benz Arena; Attendance: 48.280; Referee: Tobias Welz

2 September 2012 2	Wolfsburg	0–4	Hannover 96	Wolfsburg
15:30		Report	Haggui 10'; Sobiech 26', 56'; Andreasen 52'	Stadium: Volkswagen Arena; Attendance: 29,451; Referee: Wolfgang Stark

14 September 2012 3	FC Augsburg	0–0	Wolfsburg	Augsburg
20:30		Report		Stadium: SGL arena Attendance: 28,512; Referee: Guido Winkmann

22 September 2012 4	Wolfsburg	1–1	SpVgg Greuther Fürth	Wolfsburg
14:30	Olić 42'	Summary	Pogatetz 28' (o.g.); Mavraj (yellow card) 64'; Petsos (yellow card) 73'	Stadium: Volkswagen Arena; Attendance: 25,552; Referee: Markus Schmidt

25 September 2012 5	Bayern Munich	3–0	Wolfsburg	Munich
20:00	Schweinsteiger 24', (yellow card) 82'; Mandžukić 57', 65'	Summary	Kahlenberg (yellow card) 35'	Stadium: Allianz Arena; Attendance: 71,000; Referee: Christian Dingert

30 September 2012 6	Wolfsburg	0–2	Mainz 05	Wolfsburg
17:30	Josué (yellow card) 42'; Träsch (yellow card) 44'; Olić (yellow card) 51'	Summary	Díaz 26'; Szalai 37'; Soto (yellow card) 53'; Baumgartlinger (yellow card) 77'; Caligiuri (yellow card) 78'	Stadium: Volkswagen Arena; Attendance: 23,795; Referee: Marco Fritz

6 October 2012 7	Schalke 04	3–0	Wolfsburg	Gelsenkirchen
15:30	Farfán 33'; Afellay 46', (yellow card) 54'; Neustädter 58'	Summary		Stadium: Veltins-Arena; Attendance: 60,671; Referee: Peter Sippel

20 October 2012 8	VfL Wolfsburg	0–2	SC Freiburg	Wolfsburg
15:30	Naldo (yellow card) 39'	Summary	Mujdža (yellow card) 11'; Caligiuri 40' (pen.); Schuster 84'; Diagne (yellow card) 86'	Stadium: Volkswagen Arena; Attendance: 25,080; Referee: Robert Hartmann

27 October 2012 9	Fortuna Düsseldorf	1–4	VfL Wolfsburg	Düsseldorf
15:30	Fink (yellow card) 59' (red card) 77'; Langeneke 71' (pen.); Ilsø (yellow card) 82'	Summary	Dost 50', 64'; Olić 53'; Josué (yellow card) 72'; Diego 78' (pen.)	Stadium: Esprit Arena; Attendance: 45,673; Referee: Tobias Welz

3 November 2012 10	1. FC Nürnberg	1–0	VfL Wolfsburg	Nuremberg
15:30	Gebhart 76'; Kiyotake (yellow card) 84'; Chandler (yellow card) 90+1'	Summary	Josué (yellow card) 49'; Fagner (yellow card) 85'; Kjær (yellow card) 90+2'	Stadium: Frankenstadion; Attendance: 37,586; Referee: Christian Dingert

11 November 2012 11	VfL Wolfsburg	3–1	Bayer Leverkusen	Wolfsburg
15:30	Diego 4', 16'; Naldo (yellow card) 7'; Dost 33'	Report (in German)	(yellow card) 48' Boenisch; (yellow card) 68' Wollscheid; (yellow card) 87' Reinartz; 90+1' Kießling	Stadium: Volkswagen Arena; Attendance: 24,825; Referee: Bastian Dankert

18 November 2012 12	1899 Hoffenheim	1–3	VfL Wolfsburg	Hoffenheim
17:30	Rudy (yellow card) 55'; Jensen (yellow card) 77'; Derdiyok 88'	Report	7' Hasebe; 24' Dost; (yellow card) 63' Josué; 78' Naldo	Stadium: Rhein-Neckar Arena; Attendance: 20,500; Referee: Günther Perl

24 November 2012 13	VfL Wolfsburg	1–1	Werder Bremen	Wolfsburg
15:30	Olić (yellow card) 26'; Dost 64'; Josué (yellow card) 88'	Report (in German)	Arnautović 35', (yellow card) 82'; Schmitz (yellow card) 40' (yellow-red card) 62'; De Bruyne (yellow card) 87'	Stadium: Volkswagen-Arena; Attendance: 29,723; Referee: Markus Schmidt

28 November 2012 14	Borussia Mönchengladbach	2–0	VfL Wolfsburg	Mönchengladbach
20:00	Arango 11'; Jantschke (yellow card) 38', (goal) 44'	Report (in German)	Polák (yellow card) 65'; Jönsson (yellow card) 90+3'	Stadium: Borussia-Park; Attendance: 40,165; Referee: Robert Hartmann

2 December 2012 15	VfL Wolfsburg	1–1	Hamburger SV	Wolfsburg
17:30 CET (UTC+01:00)	Naldo (yellow card) 22'; Kjær 68'	Report (in German)	Beister 26'; Rincón (yellow card) 64'; Adler (yellow card) 68'; Westermann (yellow card) 83'	Stadium: Volkswagen Arena; Attendance: 28,121; Referee: Peter Sippel

8 December 2012 16	Borussia Dortmund	2–3	VfL Wolfsburg	Dortmund
15:30	Reus 6', (yellow card) 49'; Schmelzer (red card) 35'; Błaszczykowski 61' (pen.); Gündoğan (yellow card) 64'; Götze (yellow card) 83'	Report (in German)	Diego 36' (pen.); Naldo 41'; Kjær (yellow card) 61'; Josué (yellow card) 63'; Dost 73'; Kahlenberg (yellow card) 90'	Stadium: Westfalenstadion; Attendance: 80,000; Referee: Wolfgang Stark

15 December 2012 17	VfL Wolfsburg	0–2	Eintracht Frankfurt	Wolfsburg
15:30	Josué (red card) 16'; Diego (yellow card) 56'; Naldo (yellow card) 89'	Report	Meier 12'; Inui 18', (yellow card) 78'	Stadium: Volkswagen Arena; Attendance: 26,452; Referee: (Germany) Peter Gagelmann

19 January 2013 18	VfL Wolfsburg	2–0	VfB Stuttgart	Wolfsburg
15:30	Diego 51'; Madlung 67'	Report	Niedermeier (yellow card) 54'; Rüdiger (yellow card) 66'	Stadium: Volkswagen Arena; Attendance: 24,125; Referee: (Germany) Felix Brych

26 January 2013 19	Hannover 96	2–1	VfL Wolfsburg	Hannover
15:30	Abdellaoue 3'; Pocognoli (red card) 34'; Diouf 38'; Huszti (yellow card) 42'; Chahed (yellow card) 83'; Hoffmann (yellow card) 90+3'	Summary	Madlung 46'; Naldo (yellow card) 47'; Diego (yellow card) 88'	Stadium: AWD-Arena; Attendance: 38,800; Referee: (Germany) Günter Perl

2 February 2013 20	VfL Wolfsburg	1–1	FC Augsburg	Wolfsburg
15:30	Naldo 23'; Diego (yellow card) 28'; Fagner (yellow card) 47'	Summary	Werner (yellow card) 6'; Morávek 25'; Baier (yellow card) 29'; Ostrzolek (yellow card) 49'	Stadium: Volkswagen Arena; Attendance: 22,257; Referee: (Germany) Marco Fritz

9 February 2013 21	Greuther Fürth	0–1	VfL Wolfsburg	Fürth
15:30	Klaus (yellow card) 9'; Sobiech (yellow card) 53'; Peković (yellow card) 55'	Summary	Dost 23'; Naldo (yellow card) 60'; Fagner (yellow card) 64'; Träsch (yellow card) 73'	Stadium: Trolli Arena; Attendance: 15,045; Referee: (Germany) Guido Winkmann

15 February 2013 22	VfL Wolfsburg	0–2	Bayern Munich	Wolfsburg
20:30	Madlung (yellow card) 24'; Vieirinha (yellow card) 35'; Dost (yellow card) 45+2'; Hasebe (yellow card) 73'; Naldo (yellow card) 80'	Summary	Mandžukić 36'; Ribéry (yellow card) 57'; Dante (yellow card) 76'; Robben 90+2'	Stadium: Volkswagen Arena; Attendance: 30,000; Referee: (Germany) Felix Zwayer

23 February 2013 23	Mainz 05	1–1	VfL Wolfsburg	Mainz
15:30	Zimling 5', (yellow card) 72'	Summary	Naldo 15'; Madlung (red card) 29'; Diego (yellow card) 39'; Kjær (yellow card) 42'	Stadium: Coface Arena; Attendance: 27,175; Referee: (Germany) Peter Sippel

2 March 2013 24	VfL Wolfsburg	1–4	Schalke 04	Wolfsburg
15:30	Olić 50'; Fagner (yellow card) 82'	Summary	Draxler 33', 63'; Jones (yellow card) 73'; Farfán 79'; Huntelaar 86'	Stadium: Volkswagen Arena; Attendance: 29,236; Referee: (Germany) Manuel Gräfe

9 March 2013 25	SC Freiburg	2–5	VfL Wolfsburg	Freiburg
15:30	Kruse 2', (yellow card) 85'; Krmas (yellow card) 15'; Flum 65'	Report	Makiadi 7' (o.g.); Vieirinha 16'; Olić (yellow card) 19', (goal) 22', 49'; Polák (yellow card) 57'; Diego (yellow card) 78', (goal) 90'; Benaglio (yellow card) 90'	Attendance: 22,900; Referee: Markus Schmidt (Stuttgart)

15 March 2013 26	VfL Wolfsburg	1–1	Fortuna Düsseldorf	Wolfsburg
20:30	Josué (yellow card) 17'; Olić 51'; Orozco (yellow card) 84'	Report	Bolly 37'; Malezas (yellow card) 83'; Tesche (yellow card) 88'	Stadium: Volkswagen Arena; Attendance: 22,540; Referee: Christian Dingert (Lebecksmühle)

31 March 2013 27	VfL Wolfsburg	2–2	1. FC Nürnberg	Wolfsburg
15:30	Diego 3', (yellow card) 65'; Olić 27'; Polák (yellow card) 40'; Hasebe (yellow card) 84'	Report	Simons 61'; Nilsson 66'	Stadium: Volkswagen Arena; Attendance: 25,524; Referee: Thorsten Kinhöfer

6 April 2013 28	Bayer Leverkusen	1–1	VfL Wolfsburg	Leverkusen
15:30	Schürrle 12'; Reinartz (yellow card) 49'; Boenisch (yellow card) 84'	Report	Kjær (yellow card) 65' (goal) 70'; Fagner (yellow card) 81'; Helmes (yellow card) 90+2'	Stadium: BayArena; Attendance: 29,288; Referee: Peter Sippel

13 April 2013 29	VfL Wolfsburg	2–2	1899 Hoffenheim	Wolfsburg
15:30 CEST	Arnold 13' (yellow card) 41'; Medojević (yellow card) 43'; Naldo 86'	Report	Salihović 35' (pen.); Roberto Firmino (yellow card) 45'; Beck 63'	Stadium: Volkswagen Arena; Attendance: 24,221; Referee: Daniel Siebert

20 April 2013 30	Werder Bremen	0–3	VfL Wolfsburg	Bremen
18:30 CEST	Fritz (yellow card) 53'; Bargfrede (yellow card) 57'; Arnautović (yellow card) 80'	Report	Arnold 13'; Olić 27'; Diego 66'; Träsch (yellow card) 84'	Stadium: Weser-Stadion; Attendance: 41,000; Referee: Felix Brych

27 April 2013 31	VfL Wolfsburg	3–1	Borussia Mönchengladbach	Wolfsburg
15:30 CEST	Arnold 34'; Olić 61'; Diego 75'	Report	Mlapa 52'; De Jong (yellow card) 83'	Stadium: Volkswagen Arena; Attendance: 30,000; Referee: Tobias Stieler

5 May 2013 32	Hamburger SV	1–1	VfL Wolfsburg	Hamburg
17:30 CEST	Son (yellow card) 20'; Westermann 45'; Rincón (yellow card) 60'; Diekmeier (yellow card) 90'	Report	Vieirinha (yellow card) 31'; Hasebe 65'; Perišić (yellow card) 90+2'	Stadium: Volksparkstadion; Attendance: 50,135; Referee: Jochen Drees

11 May 2013 33	VfL Wolfsburg	3–3	Borussia Dortmund	Wolfsburg
15:30 CEST	Perišić 14', 22'; Naldo 26'; Polák (yellow card) 63'	Report	Bender 5'; Reus (yellow card) 44' (goal) 84', 87'; Gündoğan (yellow card) 62'	Stadium: Volkswagen Arena; Attendance: 30,000; Referee: Günter Perl

18 May 2013 34	Eintracht Frankfurt	2–2	VfL Wolfsburg	Frankfurt
15:30 CEST	Meier 36' (pen.); Zambrano (yellow card) 45+1'; Rode (yellow card) 60'; Russ (yellow card) 68'; Rodríguez 90' (o.g.)	Report	Polák 8'; Diego 19' (yellow card) 28'; Hasebe (red card) 35'	Stadium: Commerzbank-Arena; Attendance: 51,500; Referee: Felix Zwayer

=== DFB-Pokal ===
18 August 2012 1st Round	Schönberg 95	0–5	VfL Wolfsburg	Lübeck
20:30		Report	Olić 28', 30', 67'; Diego 43'; Dost 66'	Stadium: PokerStars.de – Stadion an der Lohmühle; Attendance: 3,500; Referee: Robert Kampka

31 October 2012 2nd Round	VfL Wolfsburg	2–0	FSV Frankfurt	Wolfsburg
20:30	Polák (yellow card) 17'; Diego 51'; Dost 61'	Summary		Stadium: Volkswagen Arena; Attendance: 7,538; Referee: Manuel Gräfe

17 December 2012 3rd Round	VfL Wolfsburg	2–1	Bayer Leverkusen	Wolfsburg
19:00	Träsch 78'; Bost 90'		Fagner 31' (o.g.)	Stadium: Volkswagen Arena; Attendance: 10,781

26 February 2013 Quarterfinals	Kickers Offenbach	1–2	VfL Wolfsburg	Offenbach am Main
20:30	Stadel 81'		Olić 49'; Dost 71'	Stadium: Sparda Bank Hessen Stadion; Attendance: 20,000

16 April 2013 Semifinals	Bayern München	6–1	VfL Wolfsburg	Munich
20:30				Stadium: Allianz Arena; Attendance: 71,000

== Squad ==
=== Squad, appearances and goals ===
As of 27 November 2012

No.	Pos	Nat	Player	Total		Bundesliga		DFB-Pokal	
No.	Pos	Nat	Player	Apps	Goals	Apps	Goals	Apps	Goals
Goalkeepers
1	GK	(Switzerland) SUI	Diego Benaglio	23	0	22	0	1	0
21	GK	(Germany) GER	Patrick Drewes	0	0	0	0	0	0
35	GK	(Switzerland) SUI	Marwin Hitz	1	0	0	0	1	0
Defenders
5	DF	(Austria) AUT	Emanuel Pogatetz	9	0	8	0	1	0
16	DF	(Greece) GRE	Sotirios Kyrgiakos	0	0	0	0	0	0
17	DF	(Germany) GER	Alexander Madlung	9	2	9	2	0	0
25	DF	(Brazil) BRA	Naldo	23	3	21	3	2	0
26	DF	(Croatia) CRO	Hrvoje Čale	0	0	0	0	0	0
31	DF	(Germany) GER	Robin Knoche	8	0	6	0	2	0
34	DF	(Switzerland) SUI	Ricardo Rodríguez	14	0	13	0	1	0
39	DF	(Germany) GER	Michael Schulze	0	0	0	0	0	0
40	DF	(Denmark) DEN	Simon Kjær	15	1	14	1	1	0
Midfielders
4	MF	(Germany) GER	Marcel Schäfer	23	0	21	0	2	0
6	MF	(Serbia) SRB	Slobodan Medojević	0	0	0	0	0	0
7	MF	(Brazil) BRA	Josué	13	0	12	0	1	0
8	MF	(Portugal) POR	Vieirinha	19	0	17	0	2	0
13	MF	(Japan) JPN	Makoto Hasebe	14	1	13	1	1	0
14	MF	(Czech Republic) CZE	Václav Pilař	0	0	0	0	0	0
15	MF	(Germany) GER	Christian Träsch	11	0	10	0	1	0
18	MF	(Germany) GER	Kevin Pannewitz	1	0	1	0	0	0
22	MF	(Poland) POL	Mateusz Klich	0	0	0	0	0	0
27	MF	(Germany) GER	Maximilian Arnold	1	0	0	0	1	0
29	MF	(Czech Republic) CZE	Jan Polák	16	0	15	0	1	0
30	MF	(Venezuela) VEN	Yohandry Orozco	0	0	0	0	0	0
37	MF	(North Macedonia) MKD	Ferhan Hasani	3	0	3	0	0	0
38	MF	(Denmark) DEN	Thomas Kahlenberg	12	0	12	0	0	0
Strikers
11	FW	(Croatia) CRO	Ivica Olić	22	5	20	2	2	3
9	FW	(Netherlands) NED	Bas Dost	23	10	21	8	2	2
No longer at club
3	DF	(Brazil) BRA	Felipe Lopes	1	0	1	0	0	0
19	FW	(Sweden) SWE	Rasmus Jönsson	4	1	4	1	0	0
23	DF	(Germany) GER	Marco Russ	0	0	0	0	0	0
24	MF	(Iran) IRI	Ashkan Dejagah	1	0	1	0	0	0
36	FW	(Croatia) CRO	Srđan Lakić	7	0	6	0	1	0
