= 2012–13 TSG 1899 Hoffenheim season =

1899 Hoffenheim
2012–13 season
- Chairman: Jochen A. Rotthaus
- Manager: Frank Kramer
- Stadium: Rhein-Neckar Arena, Sinsheim, Baden-Württemberg
- Bundesliga: 16th
- DFB-Pokal: First round
Home colours	Away colours	Third colours

The 2012–13 TSG 1899 Hoffenheim season was the 114th season in the club's football history. In 2012–13 the club played in the Bundesliga, the top tier of German football. It was the club's fifth consecutive season in this league, having been promoted from the 2. Bundesliga in 2008.

The club also took part in the 2012–13 edition of the DFB-Pokal, where they were eliminated in the first round by fourth division side Berliner AK 07, losing 4–0.

== Review and events ==
1899 Hoffenheim began their season with a 4–0 defeat against regional team Berliner AK, the largest victory for a fourth division club against a Bundesliga side. Tim Wiese made his competitive debut for the club. On 3 December, manager Markus Babbel was released because of poor results, with the team in 16th place in the Bundesliga.

== Competitions ==
=== Bundesliga ===
==== League table ====
Pos	Team	Pld	W	D	L	GF	GA	GD	Pts	Qualification or relegation
14	Werder Bremen	34	8	10	16	50	66	−16	34	
15	FC Augsburg	34	8	9	17	33	51	−18	33	
16	1899 Hoffenheim (O)	34	8	7	19	42	67	−25	31	Qualification for the relegation play-offs
17	Fortuna Düsseldorf (R)	34	7	9	18	39	57	−18	30	Relegation to 2. Bundesliga
18	Greuther Fürth (R)	34	4	9	21	26	60	−34	21	Relegation to 2. Bundesliga

Source: Bundesliga.de, kicker.de
Rules for classification: 1) points; 2) goal difference; 3) number of goals scored.
(O) Play-off winners; (R) Relegated

==== Matches ====
Win Draw Loss Postponed

25 August 2012 1	Borussia Mönchengladbach	2–1	1899 Hoffenheim	Mönchengladbach
15:30 CEST (UTC+02:00)	Jantschke (yellow card) 22'; Hanke 33'; Arango 79'; Xhaka (yellow card) 88'	Report	Roberto Firmino 66'	Stadium: Borussia-Park; Attendance: 50,146; Referee: Peter Sippel

1 September 2012 2	1899 Hoffenheim	0–4	Eintracht Frankfurt	Sinsheim
15:30 CEST (UTC+02:00)	Schröck (yellow card) 30' (yellow-red card) 73'; Weis (yellow card) 57'; Salihović (yellow card) 69' (yellow-red card) 70'	Report (in German)	Oczipka (yellow card) 4'; Meier 39', 83' (pen.) Schwegler 43'; Inui (yellow card) 73'; Lanig 90'	Stadium: Rhein-Neckar-Arena; Attendance: 29,650; Referee: Michael Weiner

16 September 2012 3	SC Freiburg	5–3	1899 Hoffenheim	Freiburg
15:30 CEST (UTC+02:00)	Guédé 17'; Kruse 27'; Sorg (yellow card) 45'; Schuster (yellow card) 63'; Diagne 68'; Makiadi 83'; Freis 87'	Report (in German)	Delpierre 2', (yellow card) 51'; Ochs (yellow card) 30'; Rudy (yellow card) 45'; Vukčević 57'; Usami 76'; Williams (yellow card) 82'	Stadium: Mage Solar Stadion; Attendance: 22,800; Referee: Felix Zwayer

23 September 2012 4	1899 Hoffenheim	3–1	Hannover 96	Sinsheim
17:30 CEST (UTC+02:00)	Johnson 27'; Williams (yellow card) 36'; Beck (yellow card) 64'; Salihović 82'; Williams 90+2'	Report (in German)	Delpierre 26' (o.g.); Felipe (yellow card) 56'; Eggimann (yellow card) 90'	Stadium: Rhein-Neckar-Arena; Attendance: 23,575; Referee: Marco Fritz

26 September 2012 5	VfB Stuttgart	0–3	1899 Hoffenheim	Stuttgart
20:00 CEST (UTC+02:00)	Kvist (yellow card) 51'; Cacau (yellow card) 75'	Report (in German)	Usami 5'; Williams (yellow card) 42'; Joselu 47', (yellow card) 78'; Johnson 58'	Stadium: Mercedes-Benz Arena; Attendance: 41,720; Referee: Peter Sippel

29 September 2012 6	1899 Hoffenheim	0–0	FC Augsburg	Sinsheim
15:30 CEST (UTC+02:00)	Volland (yellow card) 11'; Williams (yellow card) 84'; Salihović (red card) 88'	Report (in German)	Vogt (yellow card) 90+1'	Stadium: Rhein-Neckar-Arena; Attendance: 22,000; Referee: Markus Schmidt

6 October 2012 7	Bayern Munich	2–0	1899 Hoffenheim	Munich
15:30 CEST (UTC+02:00)	Ribéry 19', 47'	Report (in German)	Williams (yellow card) 55'; Beck (yellow card) 59'; Roberto Firmino (yellow card) 65'	Stadium: Allianz Arena; Attendance: 71,000; Referee: Tobias Stieler

19 October 2012 8	1899 Hoffenheim	3–3	Greuther Fürth	Sinsheim
20:30 CEST (UTC+02:00)	Roberto Firmino 8'; Joselu 67', 89'	Report (in German)	Stieber (yellow card) 25', (goal) 39'; Fürstner (yellow card) 42'; Prib (yellow card) 45+1', (goal) 84'; Sararer (yellow card) 49'; Kleine (yellow card) 79'; Sobiech 90+3'	Stadium: Rhein-Neckar-Arena; Attendance: 22,150; Referee: Daniel Siebert

27 October 2012 9	Mainz 05	3–0	1899 Hoffenheim	Mainz
15:30 CEST (UTC+02:00)	Szalai 21', 46', 64'	Report (in German)	Baumgartlinger (yellow card) 34'; Williams (yellow card) 68'; Rudy (yellow card) 69'	Stadium: Coface Arena; Attendance: 28,067; Referee: Guido Winkmann

3 November 2012 10	1899 Hoffenheim	3–2	Schalke 04	Sinsheim
15:30 CET (UTC+01:00)	Volland 13'; Rudy (yellow card) 20'; Roberto Firmino 67' (pen.); Schipplock 90+1'	Report (in German)	Neustädter 37'; Fuchs (yellow card) 63'; Afellay (yellow card) 64'; Huntelaar (yellow card) 73'; Uchida 82'	Stadium: Rhein-Neckar-Arena; Attendance: 30,150; Referee: Deniz Aytekin

10 November 2012 11	Fortuna Düsseldorf	1–1	1899 Hoffenheim	Düsseldorf
15:30 CET (UTC+01:00)	Kruse 4'; Levels (yellow card) 77'	Report (in German)	Roberto Firmino (yellow card) 33'; Joselu 39'; Compper (yellow card) 47' (yellow-red card) 51'	Stadium: Esprit Arena; Attendance: 41,200; Referee: Robert Hartmann

18 November 2012 12	1899 Hoffenheim	1–3	VfL Wolfsburg	Sinsheim
17:30 CET (UTC+01:00)	Rudy (yellow card) 55'; Jensen (yellow card) 77'; Derdiyok 88'	Report	Hasebe 7'; Dost 24'; Josué (yellow card) 63'; Naldo 78'	Stadium: Rhein-Neckar-Arena; Attendance: 20,500; Referee: Günter Perl

25 November 2012 13	1899 Hoffenheim	1–2	Bayer Leverkusen	Sinsheim
17:30 CET (UTC+01:00)	Delpierre (yellow card) 9'; Johnson 59'	Report (in German)	Bender 15'; Carvajal 38'; Toprak (yellow card) 40'; Reinartz (yellow card) 78'	Stadium: Rhein-Neckar-Arena; Attendance: 22,100; Referee: Christian Dingert

28 November 2012 14	1. FC Nürnberg	4–2	1899 Hoffenheim	Nuremberg
20:45 CET (UTC+01:00)	Kiyotake 6', 86'; Klose (yellow card) 23'; Nilsson 43'; Polter 69'	Report (in German)	Roberto Firmino (yellow card) 14'; Delpierre (yellow card) 18'; Schipplock 33'; Rudy (yellow card) 65'; Salihović 81' (pen.); Beck (yellow card) 89'	Stadium: Stadion Nürnberg; Attendance: 30,397; Referee: Jochen Drees

2 December 2012 15	1899 Hoffenheim	1–4	Werder Bremen	Sinsheim
15:30 CET (UTC+01:00)	Schipplock (yellow card) 10'; Schröck (yellow card) 21'; Salihović (yellow card) 43', (goal) 50'	Report (in German)	Prödl (yellow card) 9', (goal) 21'; Arnautović 29', 73', 79'	Stadium: Rhein-Neckar-Arena; Attendance: 23,500; Referee: Knut Kircher

7 December 2012 16	Hamburger SV	2–0	1899 Hoffenheim	Hamburg
20:30 CET (UTC+01:00)	Rudņevs 27', 74'; Skjelbred (yellow card) 84'	Report (in German)	Volland (yellow card) 46'	Stadium: Imtech Arena; Attendance: 47,000; Referee: Michael Weiner

16 December 2012 17	1899 Hoffenheim	1–3	Borussia Dortmund	Sinsheim
15:30 CET (UTC+01:00)	Schipplock 35'; Weis (yellow card) 53'	Report (in German)	Götze 26'; Großkreutz 58'; Lewandowski 66'	Stadium: Rhein-Neckar-Arena; Attendance: 30,150; Referee: Florian Meyer

19 January 2013 18	1899 Hoffenheim	0–0	Borussia Mönchengladbach	Sinsheim
15:30 CET (UTC+01:00)	Vestergaard (yellow card) 30'; Weis (yellow card) 52'; Usami (yellow card) 71'	Report (in German)	Brouwers (yellow card) 43'; Herrmann (yellow card) 87'	Stadium: Rhein-Neckar-Arena; Attendance: 26,750; Referee: Peter Sippel

26 January 2013 19	Eintracht Frankfurt	2–1	1899 Hoffenheim	Frankfurt
15:30 CET (UTC+01:00)	Rode (yellow card) 5'; Lanig 35'; Aigner 67'; Zambrano (yellow card) 77'	Report (in German)	Advíncula (yellow card) 22'; Usami (yellow card) 44'; Volland 65'	Stadium: Commerzbank Arena; Attendance: 38,100; Referee: Jochen Drees

2 February 2013 20	1899 Hoffenheim	2–1	SC Freiburg	Sinsheim
15:30 CET (UTC+01:00)	Volland 10', 27'; Beck (yellow card) 28'; Polanski (yellow card) 65'; Roberto Firmino (yellow card) 83'	Report (in German)	Kruse 4'; Hedenstad (yellow card) 45'; Schuster (yellow card) 90+2'	Stadium: Rhein-Neckar-Arena; Attendance: 24,000; Referee: Robert Hartmann

9 February 2013 21	Hannover 96	1–0	1899 Hoffenheim	Hannover
15:30 CET (UTC+01:00)	Diouf 8', (yellow card) 89'; Pander (yellow card) 12'	Report (in German)	Roberto Firmino (yellow card) 16'; Polanski (yellow card) 45'	Stadium: AWD Arena; Attendance: 35,200; Referee: Daniel Siebert

17 February 2013 22	1899 Hoffenheim	0–1	VfB Stuttgart	Sinsheim
15:30 CET (UTC+01:00)	Williams (yellow card) 44'; Joselu (yellow card) 73'	Report (in German)	Harnik 3', (yellow card) 83'; Boka (yellow card) 19'; Traoré (yellow card) 63'; Okazaki (yellow card) 90+1'; Rüdiger (yellow card) 90+3'; Ibišević (yellow card) 90+4'	Stadium: Rhein-Neckar-Arena; Attendance: 28,750; Referee: Guido Winkmann

23 February 2013 23	FC Augsburg	2–1	1899 Hoffenheim	Augsburg
15:30 CET (UTC+01:00)	Hahn (yellow card) 1'; Ji 45'; Mölders 79'; De Camargo 90+2'	Report (in German)	Volland (yellow card) 4'; Beck (yellow card) 39'; Polanski (yellow card) 50'; Vestergaard (yellow card) 70'; Schröck (yellow card) 88'	Stadium: SGL arena Attendance: 28,211; Referee: Florian Meyer

3 March 2013 24	1899 Hoffenheim	0–1	Bayern Munich	Sinsheim
15:30 CET (UTC+01:00)	Williams (yellow card) 54'; Schröck (yellow card) 69'; Derdiyok (yellow card) 82'	Report (in German)	Boateng (yellow card) 44'; Gómez 38'	Stadium: Rhein-Neckar-Arena; Attendance: 30,150; Referee: Thorsten Kinhöfer

9 March 2013 25	Greuther Fürth	0–3	1899 Hoffenheim	Fürth
15:30	Petsos (yellow card) 26'; Peković (yellow card) 88'	Summary	Roberto Firmino 10', (yellow card) 11'; Joselu 16'; Volland (yellow card) 38'; Weis 50'	Stadium: Trolli Arena; Attendance: 15,760; Referee: Knut Kircher

16 March 2013 26	1899 Hoffenheim	0–0	Mainz 05	Sinsheim
15:30	Ochs (yellow card) 48'; Vestergaard (yellow card) 73'	Summary	Wetklo (yellow card) 61'	Stadium: Rhein-Neckar-Arena; Attendance: 24,500; Referee: Robert Hartmann

30 March 2013 27	Schalke 04	3–0	1899 Hoffenheim	Gelsenkirchen
15:30	Neustädter (yellow card) 61'; Höger 72'; Raffael 79'; Pukki 83'	Summary	Vestergaard (yellow card) 21'; Roberto Firmino (yellow card) 69'	Stadium: Veltins-Arena; Attendance: 60,743; Referee: Felix Brych

5 April 2013 28	1899 Hoffenheim	3–0	Fortuna Düsseldorf	Sinsheim
20:30	Roberto Firmino 11'; Salihović (yellow card) 45+1'; Lambertz 75' (o.g.); Schipplock (yellow card) 77'; Weis (yellow card) 83'; Volland 90+4'	Summary	Latka (yellow card) 14'; Tesche (yellow card) 36'; Ilsø (yellow card) 77'	Stadium: Rhein-Neckar-Arena; Attendance: 28,000; Referee: Wolfgang Stark

13 April 2013 29	VfL Wolfsburg	2–2	1899 Hoffenheim	Wolfsburg
15:30	Arnold 13', (yellow card) 41'; Medojević (yellow card) 43'; Naldo 86'	Summary	Salihović 35' (pen.); Roberto Firmino (yellow card) 45'; Beck 63'	Stadium: Volkswagen Arena; Attendance: 24,221; Referee: Daniel Siebert

20 April 2013 30	Bayer Leverkusen	5–0	1899 Hoffenheim	Leverkusen
15:30	Kießling 16', 65'; Schürrle 31', 69'; Sam (yellow card) 78'; Reinartz 79'	Summary	Polanski (red card) 23'	Stadium: BayArena; Attendance: 28,683; Referee: Guido Winkmann

27 April 2013 31	1899 Hoffenheim	2–1	1. FC Nürnberg	Sinsheim
15:30	Weis 11'; Salihović 19'; Rudy (yellow card) 32'; Casteels (yellow card) 57'	Summary	Esswein (yellow card) 39'; Simons 58' (pen.); Balitsch (yellow card) 68'	Stadium: Rhein-Neckar-Arena; Attendance: 28,675; Referee: Markus Schmidt

4 May 2013 32	Werder Bremen	2–2	1899 Hoffenheim	Bremen
15:30	Hunt 2' (pen.); De Bruyne 24'; Fritz (yellow card) 45+1'; Kroos (yellow card) 58'; Bargfrede (yellow card) 62'	Summary	Abraham (yellow card) 1'; Vestergaard (yellow card) 74'; Schipplock (yellow card) 79', (goal) 85', 90+1'	Stadium: Weserstadion; Attendance: 41,000; Referee: Robert Hartmann

11 May 2013 33	1899 Hoffenheim	1–4	Hamburger SV	Sinsheim
15:30	Volland 61'	Summary	Son 18'; Aogo 35'; Jiráček 60'; Diekmeier (yellow card) 85'; Rudņevs 88'	Stadium: Rhein-Neckar-Arena; Attendance: 30,150; Referee: Christian Dingert

18 May 2013 34	Borussia Dortmund	1–2	1899 Hoffenheim	Dortmund
15:30	Lewandowski 6'; Weidenfeller (red card) 80'; Reus (yellow card) 85'	Summary	Rudy (yellow card) 26'; Vestergaard (yellow card) 30'; Schipplock (yellow card) 71'; Salihović 77' (pen.), 82' (pen.); Roberto Firmino (yellow card) 80'	Stadium: Westfalenstadion; Attendance: 80,645; Referee: Jochen Drees

==== Relegation play-offs ====
1899 Hoffenheim, as the 16th-placed team, faced third-placed 2012–13 2. Bundesliga side Kaiserslautern in a two-legged play-off.

23 May 2013 First leg	1899 Hoffenheim	3–1	1. FC Kaiserslautern	Sinsheim
20:30 CEST	Roberto Firmino 11', 29'; Schipplock 67'	Report	Idrissou 58'	Stadium: Rhein-Neckar Arena; Attendance: 30,135; Referee: Felix Brych

27 May 2013 Second leg	1. FC Kaiserslautern	1–2 (2–5 agg.)	1899 Hoffenheim	Kaiserslautern
20:30 CEST	Baumjohann 65'	Report	Abraham 44'; Vestergaard 74'	Stadium: Fritz-Walter-Stadion; Attendance: 49,780; Referee: Florian Meyer
Note: 1899 Hoffenheim won 5–2 on aggregate and retained its Bundesliga spot for the 2013–14 season.

=== DFB-Pokal ===
18 August 2012 1st Round	Berliner AK	4–0	1899 Hoffenheim	Berlin
15:30 CEST (UTC+02:00)	Cakmak 3', 49'; Gerlach 31'; Kruschke 40'			Stadium: Poststadion; Attendance: 1.468; Referee: Sascha Stegemann (Niederkassel)

== Squad ==
=== Squad and statistics ===
As of 4 March 2013

No.	Pos	Nat	Player	Total		Bundesliga		DFB-Pokal	
No.	Pos	Nat	Player	Apps	Goals	Apps	Goals	Apps	Goals
Goalkeepers
1	GK	(Germany) GER	Tim Wiese	11	0	10	0	1	0
19	GK	(Germany) GER	Jens Grahl	0	0	0	0	0	0
30	GK	(Belgium) BEL	Koen Casteels	9	0	9	0	0	0
34	GK	(Brazil) BRA	Heurelho Gomes	5	0	5	0	0	0
Defenders
2	DF	(Germany) GER	Andreas Beck	22	0	21	0	1	0
3	DF	(Germany) GER	Matthias Jaissle	0	0	0	0	0	0
4	DF	(Germany) GER	Stefan Thesker	1	0	0	0	1	0
12	DF	(Argentina) ARG	David Abraham	5	1	5	0	0	1
14	DF	(Brazil) BRA	Chris	0	0	0	0	0	0
15	DF	(France) FRA	Matthieu Delpierre	20	1	19	1	1	0
16	DF	(United States) USA	Fabian Johnson (Note: Johnson was born in Munich, West Germany, and represented them at every youth level between U-17 and U-21, but also qualifies to represent the United States internationally through his father and made his international debut for the United States in November 2011.)	23	3	23	3	0	0
21	DF	(Germany) GER	Patrick Ochs	6	0	6	0	0	0
28	DF	(Germany) GER	Pelle Jensen	2	0	2	0	0	0
29	DF	(Denmark) DEN	Jannik Vestergaard	8	0	7	0	1	0
35	DF	(Germany) GER	Kevin Conrad	0	0	0	0	0	0
40	DF	(Philippines) PHI	Stephan Schröck (Note: Schröck was born in Schweinfurt, West Germany, and represented them at every youth level between U-18 and U-20, but also qualifies to represent the Philippines internationally through his mother and made his international debut for the Philippines in June 2011.)	8	0	8	0	0	0
Midfielders
6	MF	(Germany) GER	Sebastian Rudy	17	0	16	0	1	0
7	MF	(Germany) GER	Boris Vukčević (Note: Vukčević was born in Osijek, Yugoslavia (now Croatia), but also qualifies to represent Germany internationally and has represented them at U-19, U-20 and U-21 level.)	6	0	5	0	1	0
8	MF	(Serbia) SRB	Filip Malbašić	0	0	0	0	0	0
13	MF	(United States) USA	Danny Williams (Note: Williams was born in Karlsruhe, West Germany, and represented them at U-15 level, but also qualifies to represent the United States internationally through his father and made his international debut for the United States in October 2011.)	18	1	18	1	0	0
17	MF	(Germany) GER	Tobias Weis	11	0	10	0	1	0
20	MF	(Tunisia) TUN	Ahmed Sassi	0	0	0	0	0	0
22	MF	(Brazil) BRA	Roberto Firmino	24	3	23	3	1	0
23	MF	(Bosnia and Herzegovina) BIH	Sejad Salihović	13	3	12	3	1	0
25	MF	(Peru) PER	Luis Advíncula	1	0	1	0	0	0
27	MF	(Liechtenstein) LIE	Sandro Wieser	0	0	0	0	0	0
32	MF	(Germany) GER	Vincenzo Grifo (Note: Grifo was born in Pforzheim, Germany, but also qualifies to represent Italy internationally through his parents and would represent them at U-20 level.)	12	0	12	0	0	0
33	MF	(Japan) JPN	Takashi Usami	20	2	19	2	1	0
37	MF	(Germany) GER	Andreas Schön	0	0	0	0	0	0
39	MF	(Germany) GER	Andreas Ludwig	0	0	0	0	0	0
41	MF	(Ghana) GHA	Afriyie Acquah	0	0	0	0	0	0
42	MF	(Poland) POL	Eugen Polanski (Note: Polanski was born in Sosnowiec, Poland, but also qualifies to represent Germany internationally and represented them at U-21 level before making his international debut for Poland in August 2011.)	18	0	17	0	1	0
Strikers
9	FW	(Germany) GER	Sven Schipplock	10	3	9	3	1	0
10	FW	(Belgium) BEL	Igor de Camargo (Note: De Camargo was born in Porto Feliz, Brazil, but received Belgian citizenship in 2009 and made his international debut for Belgium in 2009.)	21	3	19	3	2	0
11	FW	(Switzerland) SUI	Eren Derdiyok	20	1	19	1	1	0
18	FW	(Spain) ESP	Joselu (Note: Joselu was born in Stuttgart, West Germany, but was raised in Spain and has represented them at U-19, U-20, and U-21 level.)	20	4	20	4	0	0
24	FW	(Austria) AUT	Michael Gregoritsch	0	0	0	0	0	0
31	FW	(Germany) GER	Kevin Volland	25	4	24	4	1	0
38	FW	(Germany) GER	Kai Herdling	0	0	0	0	0	0

==== In ====
No.	Pos.	Nat.	Name	Age	EU	Moving from	Type	Transfer window	Ends	Transfer fee	Source
	MF	(Japan)	Takashi Usami	20		Gamba Osaka (Japan)	Loan	Summer	2013	Undisclosed	
	MF	(United States)	Joseph-Claude Gyau	19		Youth system	Promoted	Summer	2012	N/A	
	MF	(Switzerland)	Eren Derdiyok	23		Bayer Leverkusen (Germany)	Transfer	Summer	2016	£5 M	
	GK	(Germany)	Tim Wiese	30		Werder Bremen	Transfer	Summer		Free	

==== Out ====
No.	Pos.	Nat.	Name	Age	EU	Moving to	Type	Transfer window	Transfer fee	Source
37	DF	(Germany)	Manuel Gulde	21	EU	SC Paderborn	End of contract	Summer	N/A	
41	DF	(Germany)	Philipp Klingmann	21	EU	Karlsruher SC	End of contract	Summer	N/A	
15	FW	(Germany)	Peniel Mlapa	21	EU	Borussia Mönchengladbach	Transfer	Summer	Undisclosed	
8	FW	(Zimbabwe)	Knowledge Musona	22		FC Augsburg	Loaned out	Summer	Undisclosed	
1	GK	(Germany)	Daniel Haas	28	EU	Union Berlin	End of contract	Summer	N/A	
33	GK	(Germany)	Tom Starke	31	EU	Bayern Munich	Transfer	Summer	Undisclosed	
26	DF	(Austria)	Andreas Ibertsberger	29	EU	Free agent	End of contract	Summer	N/A	
39	FW	(Croatia)	Srđan Lakić	28		VfL Wolfsburg	End of loan	Summer	N/A	
