= Fagner (footballer, born 1989) =

Brazilian footballer (born 1989)

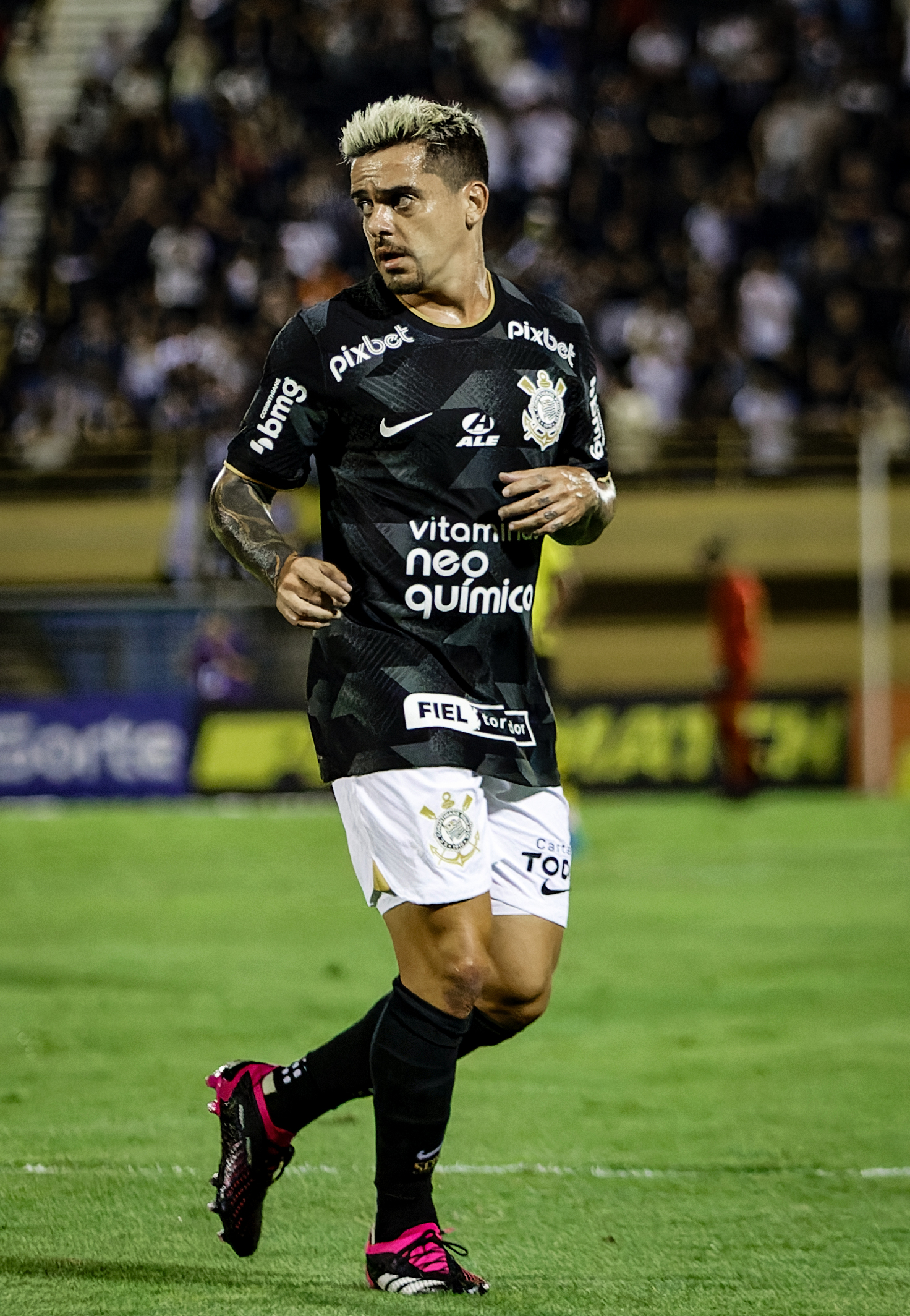
- Fagner with Corinthians at the 2022 Campeonato Paulista

Personal information
- Full name: Fagner Conserva Lemos
- Date of birth: 11 June 1989 (age 37)
- Place of birth: São Paulo, Brazil
- Height: 1.68 m (5 ft 6 in)
- Position: Right-back

Team information
- Current team: Cruzeiro
- Number: 23

Youth career
- 1998–2006: Corinthians

Senior career*
Years	Team	Apps	(Gls)
2006–2007	Corinthians	7	(0)
2007–2008	PSV	3	(1)
2007	→ Vitória (loan)	0	(0)
2009–2012	Vasco da Gama	117	(14)
2012–2014	VfL Wolfsburg	26	(0)
2013	→ Vasco da Gama (loan)	26	(0)
2014–2026	Corinthians	294	(6)
2025	→ Cruzeiro (loan)	13	(0)
2026–	Cruzeiro	9	(0)

International career^{‡}
2007	Brazil U20	3	(0)
2017–2019	Brazil	10	(0)
Medal record
Men's football
Representing Brazil
Copa América
Winner	2019 Brazil
- * Club domestic league appearances and goals as of 9 April 2026 ‡ National team caps and goals as of 23:41, 10 September 2019 (UTC)

Fagner Conserva Lemos (born 11 June 1989), simply known as Fagner, is a Brazilian professional footballer who plays as a right-back for Campeonato Brasileiro Série A club Cruzeiro.

== Club career ==
Fagner made his debut aged just 17 and helped Corinthians by trouncing Fortaleza 4–0 in an away match for the 2006 Campeonato Brasileiro Série A.

In 2007, he moved to PSV.

In 2009, he went to Vasco da Gama. In Vasco he was the champion of Série B in 2009. In 2011, he won the Copa do Brasil.

On 24 July 2012, he joined VfL Wolfsburg on a four-year contract. After one season in the Bundesliga he returned to former club Vasco da Gama on loan until the end of 2013.

in 2014, after seven years, Fagner returned to Corinthians on loan from Wolfsburg. At the beginning of 2015, Corinthians acquired half of his economical rights and signed him exclusively.

== International career ==
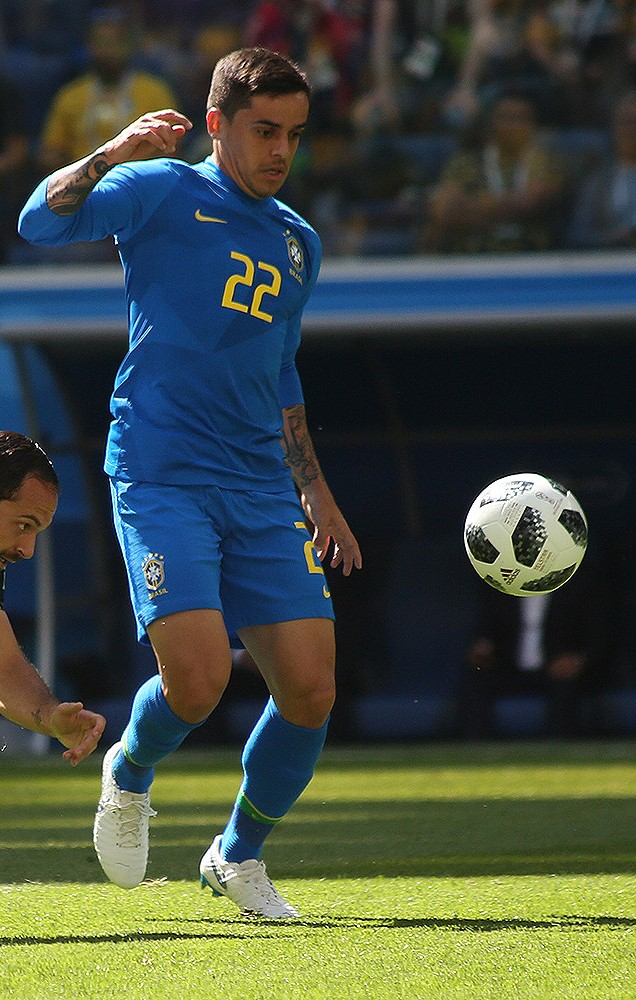
Fagner in action against Costa Rica in the 2018 FIFA World Cup

Fagner was a member of the Brazilian under-20 team on 2007 South American U-20 Championship, which Brazil went on to win.

Fagner was named in Brazil's provisional squad for Copa América Centenario but was cut from the final squad.

On 22 August 2016, Fagner was called up by new Brazil national team coach Tite to 2018 World Cup qualification games against Ecuador and Colombia. According to Fagner, this is a "unique moment" in his career.

On 14 May 2018, Fagner was included by Tite in the 23-man Brazil squad for the 2018 FIFA World Cup in Russia. Initially a back-up to Dani Alves, and then to Danilo who replaced the injured Alves, Fagner made his debut in the competition in the second group stage game, against Costa Rica, which Brazil won 2–0, starting the game due to Danilo's injury. He then proceeded to play the next three games, as Danilo's injuries persisted, with Brazil eventually falling to Belgium in the quarter-finals.

In May 2019, he was called for the Copa América, which Brazil was due to host. With Dani Alves playing the entire tournament as captain and starting right-back, Fagner was the only outfield player from the squad to not enter a match during the competition, and the third overall alongside reserve keepers Ederson and Cássio, as Brazil eventually conquered their 9th continental title.

== Career statistics ==
=== Club ===
As of 10 November 2024

Appearances and goals by club, season and competition
Club	Season	League			State League		National cup		Continental		Other		Total	
Club	Season	Division	Apps	Goals	Apps	Goals	Apps	Goals	Apps	Goals	Apps	Goals	Apps	Goals
Corinthians	2006	Série A	7	0	—		—		—		—		7	0
Vitória	2007	Série B	0	0	0	0	0	0	—		0	0	0	0
PSV	2007–08	Eredivisie	3	1	—		0	0	0	0	—		3	1
Vasco da Gama	2009	Série B	13	2	2	0	0	0	—		—		15	2
Vasco da Gama	2010	Série A	28	2	8	3	3	0	—		—		39	5
Vasco da Gama	2011	Série A	35	4	9	1	4	0	8 (Note: Appearance(s) in Copa Sudamericana)	0	—		56	5
Vasco da Gama	2012	Série A	7	1	15	1	—		9 (Note: Appearance(s) in Copa Libertadores)	0	—		31	2
Vasco da Gama	Total		83	9	34	5	7	0	17	0	—		141	14
VfL Wolfsburg	2012–13	Bundesliga	26	0	—		4	0	—		—		30	0
Vasco da Gama (loan)	2013	Série A	26	0	—		3	0	—		—		29	0
Corinthians	2014	Série A	35	2	11	0	7	0	—		—		53	2
Corinthians	2015	Série A	26	0	11	1	1	0	10	1	—		48	2
Corinthians	2016	Série A	24	1	13	2	3	0	7	0	—		47	3
Corinthians	2017	Série A	31	0	13	0	6	0	3	0	—		53	0
Corinthians	2018	Série A	20	0	15	0	7	0	5	0	—		47	0
Corinthians	2019	Série A	30	1	13	0	6	0	10	0	—		59	1
Corinthians	2020	Série A	32	2	16	0	2	1	2	0	—		52	3
Corinthians	2021	Série A	35	0	6	1	3	0	3	0	—		47	1
Corinthians	2022	Série A	17	0	12	0	8	0	6	0	—		45	0
Corinthians	2023	Série A	30	0	11	0	8	0	8	0	—		57	0
Corinthians	2024	Série A	14	0	11	0	7	0	9	0	—		41	0
Corinthians	Total		294	6	132	4	58	1	61	1	0	0	549	12
Career total			439	16	166	9	72	1	80	1	0	0	759	27

=== International ===
As of match played 10 September 2019

Appearances and goals by national team and year
National team	Year	Apps	Goals
Brazil	2017	3	0
Brazil	2018	5	0
Brazil	2019	2	0
Total		10	0

== Honours ==
EC Vitória

- Campeonato Baiano: 2007

PSV

- Eredivisie: 2008
- Johan Cruyff Shield: 2008

Vasco da Gama

- Campeonato Brasileiro Série B: 2009
- Copa do Brasil: 2011

Corinthians

- Campeonato Brasileiro Série A: 2015, 2017
- Campeonato Paulista: 2017, 2018, 2019

Cruzeiro

- Campeonato Mineiro: 2026

Brazil

- Copa América: 2019

Individual

- Campeonato Brasileiro Série A Team of the Year: 2011, 2017, 2020
- Best Right-back in Brazil: 2017, 2020
- Campeonato Paulista Team of the Year: 2015, 2016, 2017
- Bola de Prata: 2017
