= Tom Trybull =

German footballer (born 1993)

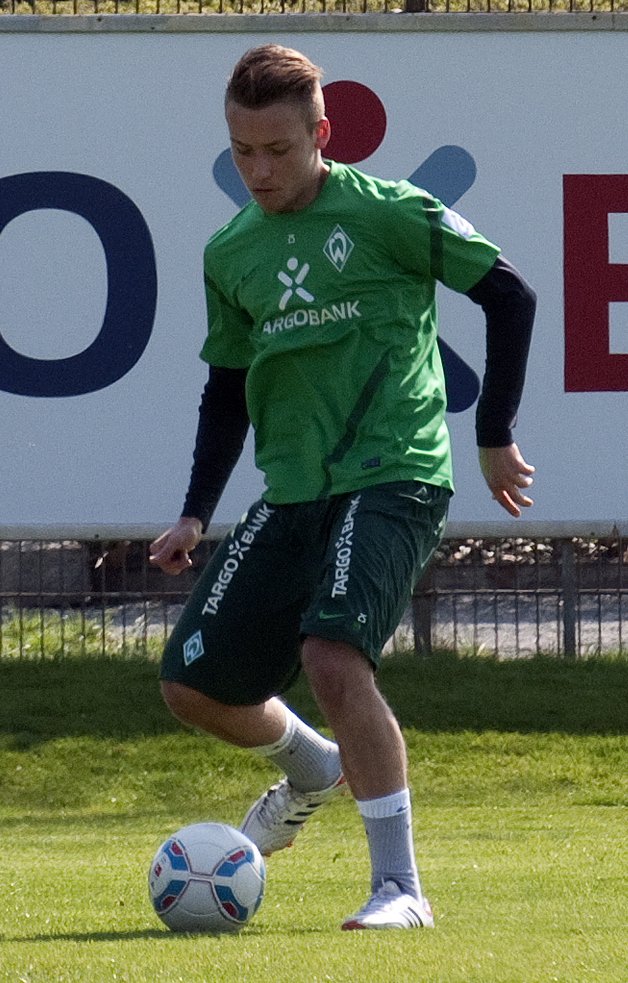
- Trybull training with Werder Bremen in 2012

Personal information
- Full name: Tom Trybull
- Date of birth: 9 March 1993 (age 33)
- Place of birth: Berlin, Germany
- Height: 1.81 m (5 ft 11 in)
- Position: Defensive midfielder

Youth career
- 1998–1999: FC Berlin
- 1999–2002: SV Lichtenberg
- 2002–2008: Union Berlin
- 2008–2010: Hansa Rostock

Senior career*
Years	Team	Apps	(Gls)
2010–2011	Hansa Rostock	17	(0)
2011–2014	Werder Bremen	21	(1)
2011–2014	Werder Bremen II	30	(0)
2014–2015	FC St. Pauli	15	(0)
2014–2015	FC St. Pauli II	10	(1)
2015–2016	Greuther Fürth	0	(0)
2015–2016	Greuther Fürth II	18	(1)
2016–2017	ADO Den Haag	23	(1)
2017–2021	Norwich City	67	(3)
2020–2021	→ Blackburn Rovers (loan)	26	(0)
2021–2022	Hannover 96	5	(0)
2021	Hannover 96 II	1	(1)
2022–2023	SV Sandhausen	25	(2)
2023	Blackpool	3	(0)
2023–2026	OB	47	(2)

International career
2009–2010	Germany U17	2	(0)
2010–2011	Germany U18	1	(0)
2011	Germany U19	2	(0)
2012–2013	Germany U20	4	(0)
- * Club domestic league appearances and goals as of 12:50, 10 August 2026 (UTC)

Tom Trybull (born 9 March 1993) is a German professional footballer who plays as a defensive midfielder. A technically sound and combative midfielder, he has played across Germany, the Netherlands, England, and Denmark, and is known for his positional intelligence, tackling ability, and composure in possession. Trybull came through the youth academies of Union Berlin and Hansa Rostock, where he won the 2010 German Youth Championship, before making his professional debut as a teenager.

He rose to the Bundesliga with Werder Bremen, where he scored his first top-flight goal in the Nordderby against Hamburger SV. After inconsistent spells with St. Pauli and Greuther Fürth, his career regained momentum at ADO Den Haag in the Eredivisie. A successful season in the Netherlands led to a move to Norwich City in 2017, where he became a fan favourite and helped the club win the EFL Championship title in 2018–19. His time in England included spells with Blackburn Rovers and Blackpool, as well as a brief return to German football with Hannover 96 and SV Sandhausen. Trybull joined Danish club OB in 2023 and re-signed with the club in 2024, helping them gain promotion back to the Danish Superliga.

At international level, Trybull represented Germany at four youth levels, earning nine caps from under-17 to under-20. Though widely regarded as a promising talent in his early years, he never received a call-up to the senior national team.

== Club career ==
=== Early years ===
Born in Berlin, Trybull came up through local youth teams—starting at FC Berlin and SV Lichtenberg 47, then joining the academy of 1. FC Union Berlin. Despite being only 15, he was fast-tracked to Union's under-17 squad in early 2008 due to his talent.

=== Hansa Rostock ===
==== Youth career ====
In the summer of 2008, Trybull was signed by Hansa Rostock, which had identified him as a standout youth prospect. He immediately became a regular for Hansa's under-17 side in the 2008–09 Under 17 Bundesliga, making 25 appearances that season. By the winter of 2009–10, while still a youth player, Trybull was training with Rostock's under-19 squad under coach Michael Hartmann. He broke into the U19 team in 2010 and helped them top their division, ultimately winning the 2010 German Youth Championship – Hansa's first national youth title since reunification – by playing in the semifinal and final of the competition.

==== First-team breakthrough ====
During the 2010–11 season, Hansa Rostock competed in the 3. Liga following relegation from the second tier of German football. At the start of the campaign, Trybull, having recently turned 17, was promoted to the club's under-19 side. Despite his youth, a succession of injuries to key first-team defenders—including regulars Matthias Holst and Stephan Gusche—prompted manager Peter Vollmann to draft Trybull and fellow teenager Pelle Jensen into the senior squad.

Trybull made his professional debut on 23 October 2010, appearing as a late substitute in a 2–2 league draw against Dynamo Dresden. Over the remainder of the campaign, he balanced appearances for both the youth and senior teams, gradually gaining experience at senior level. In December 2010, still aged 17, Trybull chose to leave formal education—then in the 11th grade at a specialist sports-focused gymnasium in Rostock-Evershagen—in order to concentrate fully on his football development.

By the close of the season, he had made 18 league appearances as Hansa Rostock secured a second-place finish in the 3. Liga, achieving promotion to the 2. Bundesliga at the first attempt. In addition to league success, he also featured in the club's run to the semifinals of the Mecklenburg-Vorpommern Cup, a regional competition which Rostock ultimately won.

=== Werder Bremen ===
In June 2011, Trybull signed a three-year contract with Bundesliga club Werder Bremen, set to run until 2014. The transfer terms remained undisclosed, though it included midfielder Timo Perthel moving to Hansa Rostock as part of the arrangement. Trybull became the second youth international to join Bremen from Hansa within a year, following the arrival of Felix Kroos.

Initially, the 18-year-old was assigned to Werder Bremen II, the club's reserve side competing in the 3. Liga under coach Thomas Wolter. He made 18 league appearances during the first half of the 2011–12 season while also training with the first team, then managed by Thomas Schaaf. Trybull was handed his Bundesliga debut on 21 January 2012, starting in an away fixture against 1. FC Kaiserslautern. Less than a month later, on 18 February, he scored his first top-flight goal in a 3–1 Nordderby victory over Hamburger SV. Following his promotion to the senior side, he ceased appearing for the reserves—who were later relegated to the Regionalliga—and featured regularly in the Bundesliga through the second half of the campaign. He concluded his debut top-flight season with 15 appearances, helping Werder Bremen secure a ninth-place finish.

The 2012–13 season proved more challenging. A combination of injuries and inconsistent form restricted Trybull's involvement in the first team, limiting him to just four Bundesliga appearances. To maintain match fitness, he also played in six Regionalliga fixtures for Werder Bremen II, who were unsuccessful in their bid for promotion.

With the arrival of head coach Robin Dutt in 2013, Trybull's role diminished further. During the first half of the 2013–14 season, he was limited to two brief substitute appearances in the Bundesliga. In search of regular playing time, he opted to leave during the winter transfer window. Although Werder Bremen offered a contract extension and proposed a loan move, Trybull declined, stating a preference for a permanent transfer in order to fully commit to a new club. Reflecting on the decision in 2019, he expressed some regret, acknowledging that frustration had influenced his departure: "I wasn't well advised and wouldn't do it the same way again," he admitted. By the time he left Bremen, Trybull had made 21 Bundesliga appearances and scored once.

=== FC St. Pauli ===
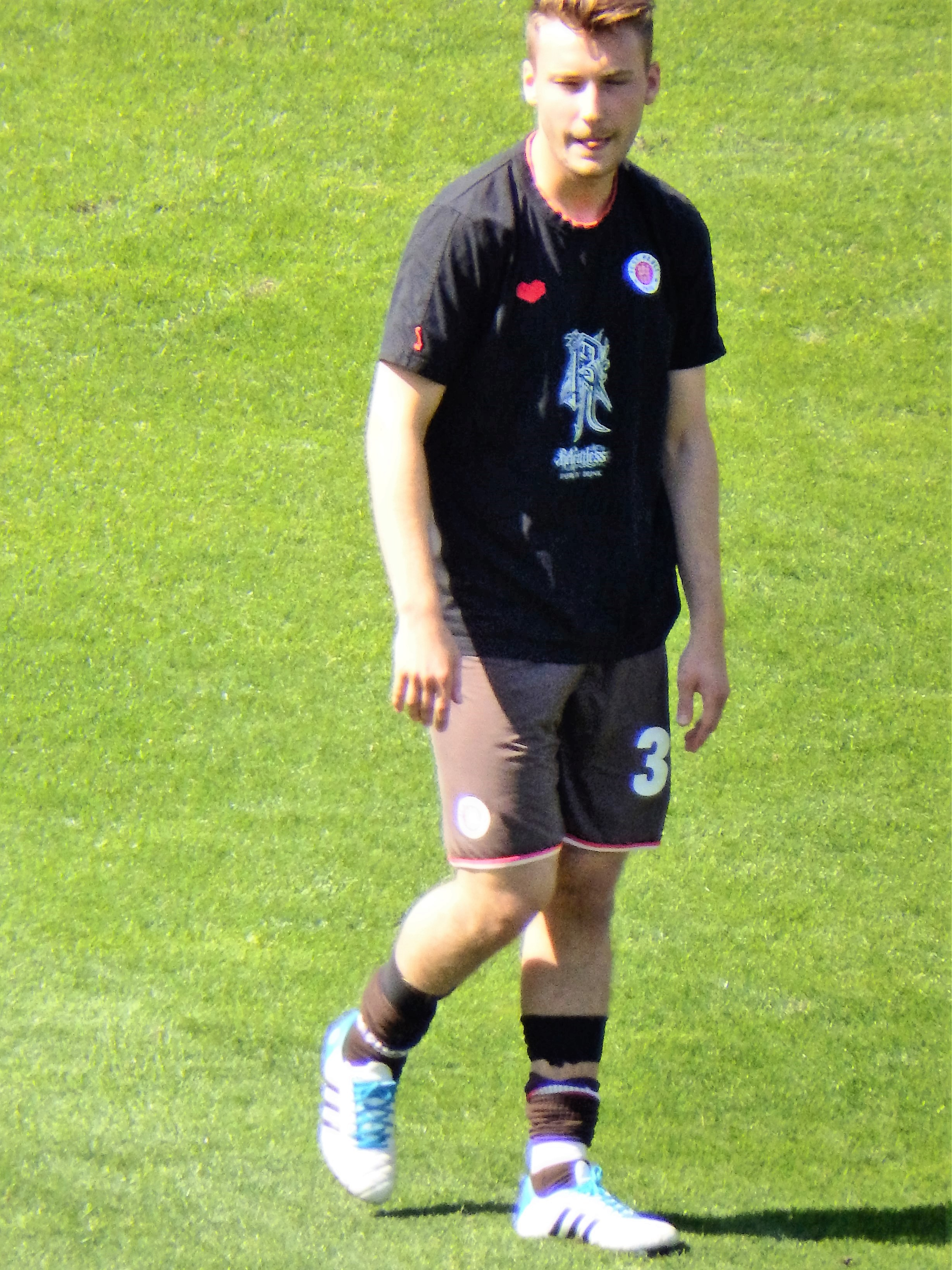
Trybull with FC St. Pauli in 2014.

In January 2014, Trybull joined FC St. Pauli, signing a contract through to the summer of 2017. The move to the 2. Bundesliga side was intended as a fresh start following limited opportunities at Werder Bremen. Upon arrival, Trybull expressed optimism, citing the club's attacking style of play and its reputation as a platform for career revival—highlighting former teammate Max Kruse's time at St. Pauli as a point of inspiration.

Despite his initial enthusiasm, Trybull found it difficult to establish himself as a regular in the first team. Over the course of the 2014–15 season, he made 15 league appearances for the senior side, while also turning out 17 times for FC St. Pauli II in the Regionalliga. His tenure was marked by limited playing opportunities and reported tensions with the coaching staff. Under manager Roland Vrabec, he was increasingly sidelined, and the arrival of Thomas Meggle did not improve his prospects. Media reports at the time suggested that off-field issues—ranging from disagreements over personal conduct to perceptions of arrogance—contributed to his marginalisation. Trybull later acknowledged that matters unrelated to football, including his personal presentation, had become distractions during this period.

At the end of the 2014–15 season, Trybull departed the club by mutual agreement, despite having signed a three-and-a-half-year deal. Reflecting on his time at St. Pauli, he described it as one of the most difficult spells of his career, noting a loss of confidence and the challenges of performing amid off-field tensions.

=== Greuther Fürth ===
On 14 June 2015, Trybull joined 2. Bundesliga club Greuther Fürth, signing a three-year contract. The move to Fürth was intended to give him a clean slate, but it ultimately did little to revive his career at that time. Trybull did not make any first-team appearances for Greuther Fürth. Instead, he found himself playing primarily for Fürth's reserve team in the fourth-tier Regionalliga Bayern, where he made 18 appearances and scored one goal. The circumstances at Fürth were unfavourable from the start: the club's president had signed Trybull before appointing a new manager, and when coach Stefan Ruthenbeck arrived, he brought in his own preferred midfielders and had no role for Trybull. As a result, Trybull was confined to the reserves and could not break into the senior squad. "Eventually your self-confidence takes a hit – that's only natural," he admitted of this stagnant phase.

After one season in Fürth, Trybull's contract was effectively cut short. In 2016, recognising that his career had stalled in Germany, he sought an opportunity abroad.

=== ADO Den Haag ===
On 29 July 2016, Trybull signed a one-year contract with Eredivisie club ADO Den Haag ahead of the 2016–17 season. Encouraged by his then-partner (later wife), Anna, to pursue the opportunity abroad, Trybull later described the move as a "rebirth" for his career. He quickly established himself as a regular starter in midfield, benefiting from consistent playing time at a top-flight level.

Over the course of the season, he made 23 league appearances and scored once. His lone goal came on 30 September 2016 in a 2–1 league defeat to PEC Zwolle.

His resurgence in the Netherlands attracted interest from clubs abroad. Following the expiration of his contract in 2017, Trybull opted to pursue a new challenge in England—a decision he later described as "the best thing I could have done."

=== Norwich City ===
Trybull moved to English club Norwich City in August 2017 following a successful trial, signing an initial one-year contract with the Championship side. At Carrow Road, he joined fellow German Daniel Farke, Norwich's head coach, and sporting director Stuart Webber—both instrumental in building a squad centered around players with Bundesliga experience who were seen as having untapped potential. Trybull fit this profile and soon established himself as a key member of the team.

He made his debut on 22 August 2017 in an EFL Cup tie against Charlton Athletic, marking the occasion by scoring a goal in a 4–1 victory. His league debut followed shortly after, and on 1 January 2018 he scored his first Championship goal in a 2–1 win over Millwall. Initially brought in on a short-term basis, Trybull's performances earned him an extended contract through to June 2022, with an option for an additional year.

Trybull quickly became a fan favourite. Supporters dubbed him "Super Tommy Trybull" and created a terrace chant in his honour, set to the tune of Earth, Wind & Fire's song "September", referring to him as a "midfield maestro" who "never gives the ball away". he attention marked a turning point for Trybull, who only two years earlier had been playing in Germany's lower divisions. He later referred to the chant as an "acoustic accolade" that affirmed his emergence at a higher level.

Trybull was a key contributor during Norwich City's 2018–19 season, which proved to be a triumph. He made 31 league appearances in midfield as Norwich won the Championship title and earned promotion to the Premier League after a three-year absence. His ball-winning abilities and positional sense provided balance to Norwich's attacking style, and he was considered a core member of the side.

In the Premier League, Trybull found playing time harder to come by. He appeared 16 times in the 2019–20 top-flight campaign, as Norwich City fought against relegation. The club ultimately finished at the bottom of the table and was relegated after just one season. Despite some solid individual displays, Trybull was unable to cement a consistent starting role at the top level.

With Norwich preparing for another Championship campaign in 2020–21, squad reshaping left Trybull on the periphery. In October 2020, he joined Blackburn Rovers on a season-long loan. At Blackburn, he featured regularly, making 25 league appearances—18 of them starts—and contributing to a mid-table finish.

Following his return from loan, Trybull and Norwich City mutually agreed to terminate his contract in August 2021, a year before its scheduled expiration. He was not part of the club's plans for their return to the Premier League, having secured promotion again in his absence. Trybull departed Norwich with 80 appearances across all competitions. Reflecting on his time at the club, he expressed gratitude for the opportunity to revive his career and for the connection he built with the fans, calling his spell at Norwich a "second chance" that he embraced fully.

=== Hannover 96 ===
On 27 August 2021, Trybull signed a one-year contract with Hannover 96 in Germany's 2. Bundesliga. The move marked a homecoming to northern Germany, the region where he had developed as a youth player. Hannover recruited Trybull to bolster the midfield with experience and physicality, with local media highlighting his "English tackling hardness"—a nod to the combative style he had adopted during his time in the Championship and Premier League.

Trybull made his debut for Hannover early in the 2021–22 season, but his time there was brief and impacted by the team's competitive situation. He logged only five league appearances for Hannover 96 in the first half of the season, plus one outing with the club's reserve team. Amid a disappointing start to the season and lingering in the lower mid-table, Hannover began reshaping the squad over the winter.

After just five months, Trybull's contract was terminated by mutual consent in January 2022 to allow him to pursue opportunities elsewhere. Despite the short stay, Hannover's sporting director acknowledged Trybull's professionalism and the leadership he brought from his Premier League experience, even if it didn't translate to a long-term role.

=== SV Sandhausen ===
On 31 January 2022, Trybull signed with 2. Bundesliga club SV Sandhausen on a free transfer. The move marked his fourth club in the space of a year, following short spells in both Germany and England. Despite the frequent transitions, Trybull adapted quickly at Sandhausen, slotting into the midfield and bringing valuable experience to a side engaged in a relegation battle.

During the remainder of the 2021–22 campaign and the first half of the 2022–23 season, he made 25 league appearances and scored twice.

However, Sandhausen continued to struggle near the bottom of the table. Amid concerns over the club's form and a need to refresh the squad, Sandhausen announced in early January 2023 that Trybull's contract had been terminated by mutual consent. Head coach Alois Schwartz later explained that Trybull had expressed a desire to leave the club as early as the previous summer and had struggled to meet the club's expectations. "Tom wasn't entirely happy here – for whatever reason. He had already tried to leave the club in August. His attitude and athletic performance were no longer up to scratch," Schwartz told Heidelberg24.

=== Blackpool ===
Following his departure from SV Sandhausen, Trybull returned to English football, signing an 18-month contract with Championship side Blackpool on 11 January 2023. Brought in to reinforce the squad during a relegation battle, his arrival was welcomed by manager Michael Appleton, who praised Trybull's composure and positional intelligence, describing him as "very calm on the ball" with "awareness of being in the right place at the right time."

Trybull expressed enthusiasm for the move, stating his comfort operating in central midfield and his intent to help dictate play through tackling and distribution. He made his debut shortly after joining and went on to feature in three Championship matches during the second half of the 2022–23 season. His involvement, however, was curtailed by injuries, squad competition and a change in managerial leadership.

Blackpool's form remained inconsistent, and the club was ultimately relegated to League One at the end of the campaign. As part of the ensuing squad overhaul, Trybull's contract was terminated by mutual consent on 31 August 2023, making him a free agent after less than eight months at the club.

=== OB ===
On 30 September 2023, Trybull signed with Danish club Odense Boldklub (OB) on a contract for the remainder of the 2023–24 Danish Superliga season. He made his debut on 2 October, coming on as a 76th-minute substitute for Sven Köhler in a 2–1 home defeat to Lyngby. Trybull made 20 league appearances and scored once during the campaign. Although OB finished ninth in the regular season, they were relegated after placing second-to-bottom in the relegation round. Statistically, he led all midfielders in the Danish Superliga in ball recoveries that season, underscoring his defensive contribution. His contract expired at the end of June 2024.

On 14 August 2024, OB announced that Trybull had rejoined the club on a new contract running until June 2026, ahead of their campaign in the second-tier Danish 1st Division. He was part of the team securing promotion back to the Danish Superliga at the first attempt.

== International career ==
Trybull represented Germany at multiple youth levels, earning a total of nine caps across the under-17, under-18, under-19, and under-20 national teams. His first appearances came in late 2009 with the Germany U17 side, for whom he featured in two matches. In 2011, he progressed to the U18 and U19 squads, playing in several friendly fixtures, including a pair of matches against Egypt's U19 team later that year.

Between 2012 and 2013, he made four appearances for the Germany U20 team, continuing to operate primarily as a defensive or central midfielder—roles consistent with his club career. Throughout his time in the national youth system, Trybull was a regular participant in training camps and matches alongside a cohort of players from his generation.

Despite his involvement at youth level, Trybull was never called up to the senior Germany national team.

== Career statistics ==
As of match played 17 May 2025

Appearances and goals by club, season and competition
Club	Season	League			National cup		League cup		Other		Total	
Club	Season	Division	Apps	Goals	Apps	Goals	Apps	Goals	Apps	Goals	Apps	Goals
Hansa Rostock	2010–11	3. Liga	17	0	0	0	—		0	0	17	0
Werder Bremen II	2011–12	3. Liga	17	0	—		—		0	0	17	0
Werder Bremen II	2012–13	Regionalliga Nord	6	0	—		—		0	0	6	0
Werder Bremen II	2013–14	Regionalliga Nord	7	0	—		—		0	0	7	0
Werder Bremen II	Total		30	0	0	0	0	0	0	0	30	0
Werder Bremen	2011–12	Bundesliga	15	1	0	0	—		0	0	15	1
Werder Bremen	2012–13	Bundesliga	4	0	0	0	—		0	0	4	0
Werder Bremen	2013–14	Bundesliga	2	0	0	0	—		0	0	2	0
Werder Bremen	Total		21	1	0	0	0	0	0	0	21	1
FC St. Pauli	2013–14	2. Bundesliga	12	0	0	0	—		0	0	12	0
FC St. Pauli	2014–15	2. Bundesliga	3	0	1	0	—		0	0	4	0
FC St. Pauli	Total		15	0	1	0	0	0	0	0	16	0
FC St. Pauli II	2014–15	Regionalliga Nord	10	1	0	0	—		0	0	10	1
Greuther Fürth II	2015–16	Regionalliga Bayern	18	1	0	0	—		0	0	18	1
ADO Den Haag	2016–17	Eredivisie	23	1	3	0	—		0	0	26	1
Norwich City	2017–18	Championship	20	2	1	0	3	1	0	0	24	3
Norwich City	2018–19	Championship	31	1	1	0	4	1	0	0	36	2
Norwich City	2019–20	Premier League	16	0	4	0	0	0	0	0	20	0
Norwich City	2020–21	Championship	0	0	0	0	0	0	0	0	0	0
Norwich City	Total		67	3	6	0	7	2	0	0	80	5
Blackburn Rovers (loan)	2020–21	Championship	25	0	1	0	0	0	0	0	26	0
Hannover 96	2021–22	2. Bundesliga	5	0	1	0	—		0	0	6	0
Hannover 96 II	2021–22	Regionalliga Nord	1	1	—		—		0	0	1	1
SV Sandhausen	2021–22	2. Bundesliga	13	2	0	0	—		—		13	2
SV Sandhausen	2022–23	2. Bundesliga	12	0	1	0	—		—		13	0
SV Sandhausen	Total		25	2	1	0	—		—		26	2
Blackpool	2022–23	Championship	3	0	1	0	0	0	0	0	4	0
Blackpool	2023–24	League One	0	0	0	0	1	0	0	0	1	0
Blackpool	Total		3	0	1	0	1	0	0	0	5	0
OB	2023–24	Danish Superliga	20	1	0	0	—		—		20	1
OB	2024–25	Danish 1st Division	25	1	0	0	—		—		25	1
OB	Total		45	2	0	0	—		—		45	2
Career total			305	12	14	0	8	2	0	0	327	14

== Honours ==
Norwich City

- EFL Championship: 2018–19

OB

- Danish 1st Division: 2024–25
