= Simon Kjær =

Danish footballer (born 1989)

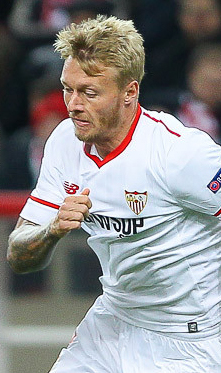
- Kjær playing for Sevilla in 2017

Personal information
- Full name: Simon Thorup Kjær
- Date of birth: 26 March 1989 (age 37)
- Place of birth: Horsens, Denmark
- Height: 1.90 m (6 ft 3 in)
- Position: Centre-back

Youth career
- 1993–2001: Lund IF
- 2001–2007: Midtjylland

Senior career*
Years	Team	Apps	(Gls)
2007–2008	Midtjylland	19	(0)
2008–2010	Palermo	62	(5)
2010–2013	VfL Wolfsburg	57	(3)
2011–2012	→ Roma (loan)	22	(0)
2013–2015	Lille	66	(1)
2015–2017	Fenerbahçe	54	(3)
2017–2020	Sevilla	46	(2)
2019–2020	→ Atalanta (loan)	5	(0)
2020	→ AC Milan (loan)	15	(0)
2020–2024	AC Milan	76	(0)
Total		422	(14)

International career
2006	Denmark U18	1	(0)
2006–2008	Denmark U19	10	(1)
2008	Denmark U20	2	(0)
2008–2011	Denmark U21	2	(0)
2009–2024	Denmark	132	(5)
- * Club domestic league appearances and goals

Simon Thorup Kjær (Danish pronunciation: [ˈsiː.mʊn ˈkʰjæːɐ̯]; born 26 March 1989) is a Danish former professional footballer who played as a centre-back.

Kjær was named 2007 Danish under-19 talent of the year and 2009 Danish Talent of the Year. He played 132 matches for Denmark, including participation at the FIFA World Cup in 2010, 2018 and 2022, and the UEFA European Championship in 2012, 2020 and 2024.

== Club career ==
=== Midtjylland ===
Born in Horsens, Kjær started playing football when he was four years old. This led him to join a small-time club, Lund IF near Horsens, before moving to the youth team of Danish Superliga club FC Midtjylland (FCM) in 2004, where his father, Jørn Kjær, was the club's equipment manager. He was one of the first players to graduate from FCM's football academy, the first of its kind in Denmark, coming through the system alongside Midtjylland teammates Jesper Weinkouff, Christian Sivebæk and former teammate, Winston Reid. Kjær started out playing in the midfield position before one of his coaches switched him to a defender position, a position he played until retirement. While at the club system, Kjær was named the best player of a French youth tournament in April 2006. This resulted in Midtjylland subsequently rejecting offers from Lille OSC for Kjær and Jesper Juelsgård.

Kjær made his senior debut for Midtjylland in the Viasat Cup training matches in June 2006, Two months later, he signed his first professional contract, keeping him until 2009. Kjær was promoted to the first team squad in January 2007. He had a successful trial with Real Madrid in August 2007, but their transfer offer was refused by FC Midtjylland. Soon after, Kjær signed a five-year contract with Midtjylland instead in September 2007.

Kjær made his Superliga debut on 30 September 2007, in the 2–0 victory against AGF By October 2007, his performances attracted the likes of Premier League clubs Middlesbrough and Chelsea. He went on to play three more matches in the first half of the Danish Superliga 2007–08 season. Kjær played all 15 games in the second half of the Superliga season, forming a defensive partnership with Magnus Troest. He kept three consecutive clean sheets between 29 March 2008 and 13 April 2008 against OB, Copenhagen and AaB.

=== Palermo ===
In February 2008, Kjær signed a five-year contract with Italian club Palermo, effective from the summer 2008, earning Midtjylland a €4 million transfer fee. On 5 June 2008, he was presented at the club's press conference alongside new signing, Andrea Raggi.

However, his start to his Palermo's career suffered a setback when Kjær faced competitions in the club's defence, as well as, adapting in Italy. On 26 October 2008, he made his Palermo debut, coming on as a half-time substitute against Fiorentina in Serie A, as they lost 3–1. After the match, his performance was praised by the club. This was followed by making his first start for the club, as they drew 1–1 against Lecce three days later. Kjær scored his first goal for Palermo in his third appearance on 2 November 2008, as well as, setting up the club's first goal of the game, in a 3–0 win over Chievo. He has been involved in the first team, establishing himself in the starting eleven, playing in the centre-back position. Due to his physical strength and tenacity, Kjær's performance continued to improve and was named the second best player under 21 in Serie A by La Gazzetta dello Sport. It wasn't until 15 March 2009 when he scored his second goal of the season, in a 5–2 win against Lecce. Kjær then scored his third goal of the season, in a 4–1 win against Bologna on 19 April 2009. For his performance, he was named Serie A's Team of the Week. Kjær ended the 2008–09 season as the club's top scoring defender in Serie A with three goals in 27 appearances in all competitions.

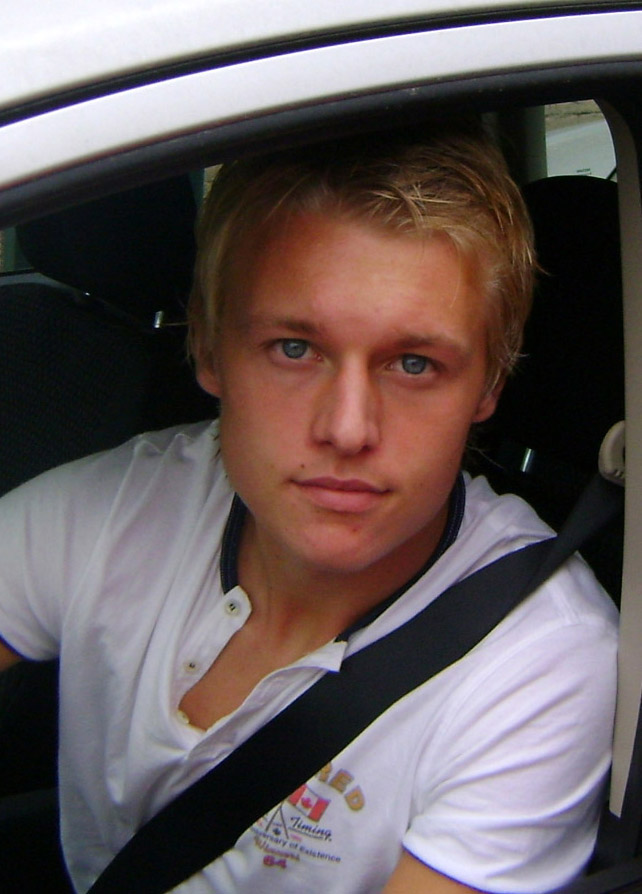
Kjær during his time at Palermo in 2009

Kjær confirmed his reputation as a first team regular in the 2009–10 season, and formed a strong defensive partnership with fellow centre-back Cesare Bovo. As a result, he signed an improved contract with the Sicilian club in September 2009. From the start of the 2009–10 season, Kjær started in every match until he missed one match, due to suspension. He returned to the starting line-up from suspension, playing the whole game, as Palermo lost 5–3 against Inter Milan on 29 October 2009. A week later on 8 November 2009, Kjær scored his first goal of the season, in a 3–1 loss against Bologna. He was named 2009 Danish Talent of the Year in November 2009, beating Arsenal's Nicklas Bendtner and Ajax's Christian Eriksen after his successful first season in Palermo. In January 2010, he was also named as Danish Footballer of the Year for 2009. The next day, Kjær celebrated with a goal against Cagliari that decided the match for Palermo as the match ended 2–1. Since returning from suspension, he started in the next ten league matches before being suspended once again. After serving a one match suspension, Kjær returned to the starting line-up against Fiorentina on 24 January 2010 and helped the club keep a clean sheet, in a 3–0 win. He started in the next nine league matches before being sent–off for a second bookable offence, in a 2–2 draw against Genoa on 24 March 2010. After serving a one match suspension, Kjær returned to the starting line–up against Catania on 3 April 2010, as they lost 2–0. He later started the remaining matches of the 2009–10 season and helped the side finish fifth place to qualify for the UEFA Europa League. At the end of the 2009–10 season, Kjær scored twice in a total 35 Serie A games (which was 38 appearances and scoring two times in all competitions).

=== VfL Wolfsburg ===
On 30 June 2010, VfL Wolfsburg confirmed they had opened talks with Kjær. It came after reported interest from teams across Europe, including English sides Manchester United, Manchester City and Tottenham Hotspur plus Italian side Juventus. The move was confirmed on 8 July 2010, as the club signed Kjær for an undisclosed fee believed to be in excess of £10 million. Following his move to Wolfsburg, Kjær said: "The transfer means I have the chance to play for a top club, I think this is the right step for me. We have a strong team that can challenge at the top of the Bundesliga. First, I need to secure a regular place." The deal made Kjær the most expensive Danish footballer of all time. Making the shift from Serie A football to the Bundesliga meant that Kjær would become one of the best paid Danish footballers with an annual salary of around €3 million. Both national coach Morten Olsen and the player, himself, agreed that the move to Wolfsburg was not only economically justifiable for the young Danish defender but also the shift that this was a step in the right direction for his development.

Kjær made his unofficial debut for VfL Wolfsburg in a pre-season fixture against FC Augsburg, in which Wolfsburg ran out 1–0 winners. His VfL Wolfsburg debut came on 15 August 2010, starting the whole game, in a 2–1 win against Preußen Münster in the first round of the DFB-Pokal. He made his Bundesliga debut for Wolfsburg in a 2–1 loss against Bayern Munich five days later on 20 August 2010. After a poor start to the season for Wolfsburg, with varying results and unmet expectations; Kjær scored his first goal for Wolfsburg in a 2–0 win over Stuttgart when he headed the ball in over the line after a corner kick. However, the goal was eventually credited to Edin Džeko after it was shown that the ball took a deflection from Džeko's shot. Despite much criticism from the media for his poor performances, Kjær played in the starting line-up in all 17 Bundesliga matches in the autumn 2010 season. After having formed a successful partnership with Italy international Andrea Barzagli in Wolfsburg's central defence, he then featured alongside German international Arne Friedrich. On 22 January 2011, Kjær scored his first Bundesliga goal with a headed goal in the 83rd minute, in a 1–0 win against Mainz 05, a win that secured the first club victory in eight matches – after seven drawn games in a row. Following Steve McClaren's sacking (who brought him to the club) due to further poor results in February 2011, Felix Magath returned to Wolfsburg (the manager guided the club to win their first Bundesliga title) and commented on criticising the 'poor condition' of the players he inherited (including Kjær) from McClaren. In connection with the dismissal, Kjær declared affection for Steve McClaren in public. Kjær said he was sorry for the firing, and was happy to work with Steve McClaren. Despite the comment from Magath, Kjær continued to regain his first team place for the rest of the 2010–11 season, though it was met by frustration, as the club narrowly avoided the drop the previous season and he had come under fire for some lacklustre displays. Despite being on the sidelines on three occasions during the 2010–11 season, he made 34 appearances and scoring once in all competitions.

In the summer transfer window 2011, Kjær revealed that head coach Magath told him that he would be allowed to leave that summer and reported that he had fallen out of favor with Magath. Amid the transfer speculation, Kjær made four appearances for Wolfsburg before departing for Roma.

==== Loan to Roma ====
Italian side Roma revealed the club were on the verge of signing Kjær on a €10 million move from Wolfsburg as a replacement for centre-back Philippe Mexès who left for AC Milan on a free transfer. However, the move to Roma was put back on hold after reports in Italy claimed the defender had been recalled by his club Wolfsburg. Instead on 30 August 2011, Kjær went out on a season-long loan deal to Roma, with the option to purchase at the end of the season.

Kjær made his debut for Roma in a 0–0 draw against Inter Milan on 17 September 2011. However, in a 2–1 loss against rivals, Lazio on 16 October 2011, he received a straight red card in the 50th minute for a foul on Cristian Brocchi, resulting in a penalty and was successfully converted by the opposition team. After the match, Kjær missed the next four matches, due to suspension and his own injury concern. On 20 November 2011, he returned to the starting line-up against Leece, as the club won 2–1. However, his return was short-lived when Kjær suffered an injury that kept him out for a month. On 11 January 2012, he returned to the starting line–up for Roma's match against Fiorentina in the Round of 16 of the Coppa Italia and helped the side keep a clean sheet, in a 3–0 win. However, during the club's 4–2 defeat to Cagliari on 1 February 2012, Kjær was at fault for his poor performance and was largely disappointing for Roma. After the match, Roma director Walter Sabatini dropped a strong hint that the club may decide against signing Kjær on a permanent basis due to his poor performance at Roma. He continued to remain in the first team for the rest of the 2011–12 season. Despite being sidelined on two more occasions later in the 2011–12 season, Kjær made 24 appearances in all competitions. Following this, Roma decided against signing Kjær permanently, citing his poor performances.

==== Return to Wolfsburg ====
After his loan-spell at Roma ended, Kjær stated he would not return to Wolfsburg, after coach Magath decided the Dane was not going to be part of his first team plans for the club's 2012–13 season. However, Magath changed his mind by announcing that he was willing to bury the hatchet with Kjær, and keen to bring him into his first team at Wolfsburg.

He made his first appearance for Wolfsburg in the opening game of the 2012–13 season against VfB Stuttgart, coming on as a late substitute, in a 1–0 win. After missing the follow-up match against Hannover 96 due to a potential transfer to Galatasaray, which later collapsed, Kjær returned to the starting line-up against FC Augsburg on 16 September 2012, as they drew 0–0. After the match, both he and his Danish compatriot Thomas Kahlenberg were praised by Manager Magath. However, Kjær found himself placed on the substitute bench in the first three months to the season. Following Magath's sacking, he returned to the starting line-up against Fortuna Düsseldorf on 27 October 2012, as the club won 4–1. Soon after, Kjær regained his first team place, playing in the centre-back position under the new management of Lorenz-Günther Köstner and Dieter Hecking. On 2 December 2012, he scored his first goal of the season, in a 1–1 draw against Hamburger SV. A month later on 19 January 2013, Kjær set up the club's second goal of the game, in a 2–0 win against Stuttgart. Following the criticism of his performance against Hannover 96 on 26 January 2013, he was dropped to the substitute bench for the next three matches. But Kjær made his return to the starting line–up against Mainz 05 on 23 February 2013, in a 1–1 draw. Following the match, he regained his first team place for the next seven matches. Kjær then scored his second goal of the season, in a 1–1 draw against Bayer Leverkusen on 6 April 2013. Two weeks later on 20 April 2013 against Werder Bremen, he set up Wolfsburg's first goal of the game before being substituted in the 54th minute after suffering an abductor problem. Following the match, Kjær never played for the club for the rest of the 2012–13 season. At the end of the 2012–13 season, he went on to make 25 appearances and scored two times in all competitions.

=== Lille LOSC ===
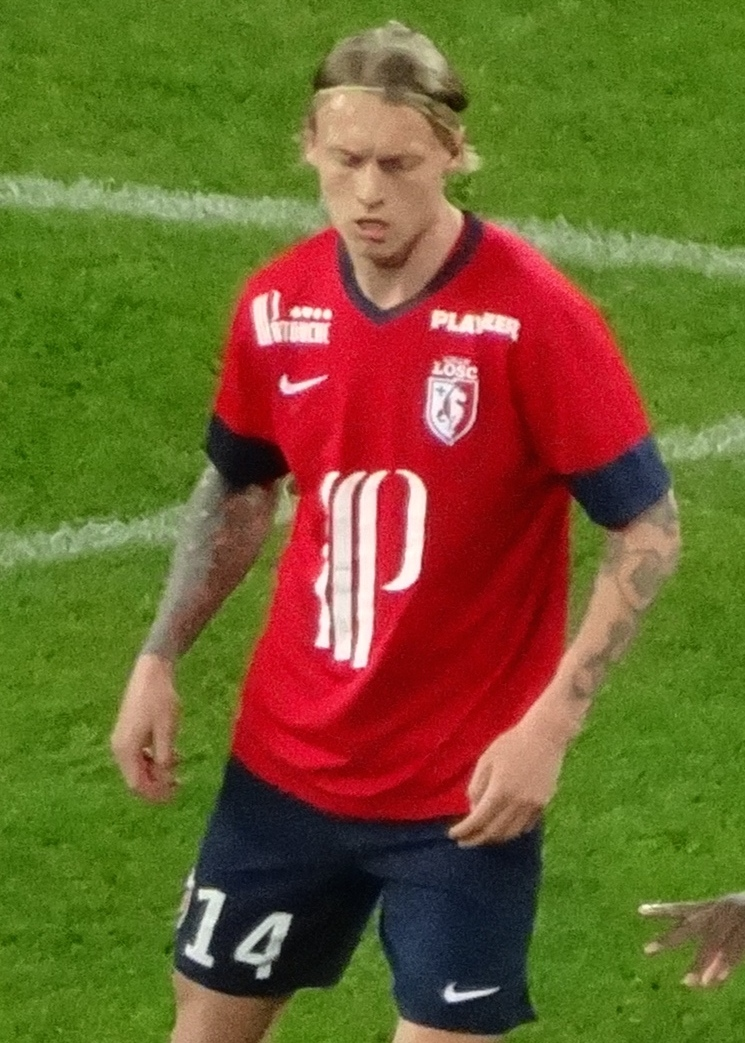
Kjær playing for Lille in 2014

On 5 July 2013, it was announced that Kjær had signed a four-year deal with Ligue 1 side, Lille. About the club, he said: "I think this is the right time for me to come to LOSC. Whether it is in my progression, from a geographical point of view, or in relation to the people who live in this region, it is obvious that the idea of joining such a club can only be the good one."

Kjær made his Lille debut in the opening game of the season against FC Lorient, where he kept a clean sheet, in a 1–0 win. Since making his debut for the club, he quickly established himself in the starting eleven, playing in the centre-back position, forming a partnership with Marko Baša. Kjær helped Lille keep two consecutive clean sheets between 25 August 2013 and 31 August 2013 against Saint-Étienne and Rennes. Once again, he helped the club keep ten consecutive clean sheets between 24 September 2013 and 3 December 2013. Kjær then set up Lille's only goal of the game, as they lost 2–1 against Stade de Reims on 12 January 2014. Nine days later on 21 January 2014, he scored his first goal for the club, in a 3–0 win against Iris Club de Croix in the second round of the Coupe de France. Kjær impressed during his first season in the French Ligue 1 as leader of the best defence in the major European national leagues in the 2013–14 season conceding only 26 goals in 38 matches including an impressive number of 21 clean sheets. As a result of the solid performances Kjær frequently appeared on various media's team of the week during the entire season, eventually earning a spot on "the Ligue 1 Team of the Season" alongside teammate and goalkeeper Vincent Enyeama. Despite missing three matches during the 2013–14 season, he made 37 appearances and scoring once in all competitions.

At the start of the 2014–15 season, Kjær played in both legs in the third round of the UEFA Champions League qualifying round against Grasshopper, as he helped Lille win 3–1 on aggregate to advance to the next round. Kjær then kept three consecutive clean sheets in the first three league matches, including scoring his first ever Ligue 1 goal against Lorient with a deflected free kick. He continued to regain his first team place, playing in the centre-back position. Kjær then scored on his UEFA Europa League debut, in a 1–1 draw against FC Krasnodar on 18 September 2014. Once again, he kept three consecutive clean sheets between 7 January 2015 and 14 January 2015, including scoring his second goal of the season, in a 2–0 win against FC Nantes in the quarter–finals of the Coupe de la Ligue. However, Kjær suffered a thigh injury during a match against Lorient on 17 January 2015 and was substituted in the 33rd minute, resulting in him missing two matches. He returned to the starting line-up against Montpellier on 7 February 2015, as the club won 2–1. Since returning to the first team from injury, Kjær continued to regain his first team place, playing in the centre-back position. Despite being sidelined on five occasions during the 2014–15 season, he went on to make 42 appearances and scored three times in all competitions.

=== Fenerbahçe ===
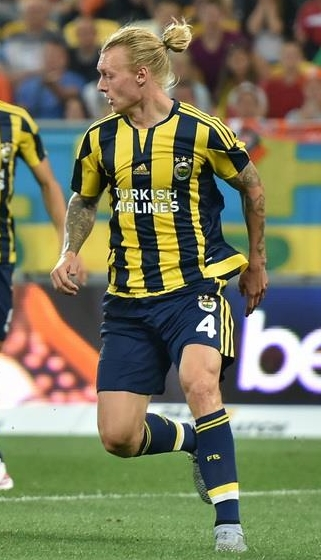
Kjær playing for Fenerbahçe in a UEFA Champions League match against Shakhtar Donetsk in 2015

Following a transfer speculation over the summer, it was announced on 16 June 2015 that Kjær joined Turkish side Fenerbahçe, signing a four-year deal for €7.65 million.

Kjær made his Fenerbahçe debut, starting the whole game, in a 0–0 draw against Shakhtar Donetsk in the first leg of the UEFA Champions League third round. However, in a return leg, he was sent–off for the second bookable offence, as the club lost 3–0, eliminating them from the tournament. Kjær then made his league debut for Fenerbahçe, starting the whole game, as they drew 1–1 against Çaykur Rizespor. However while on international duty, he suffered an ankle injury that saw him out for three weeks. On 27 September 2015, Kjær returned to the starting line–up against Beşiktaş, only for him to score an own goal, as the club lost 3–2. As a result, his performance was subjected of criticism, due to picking up cards in his first seven official matches. Despite this, he continued to regain first team place, playing in the centre–back position. Over time, his performance began to improve. On 28 December 2015, Kjær scored his first goal for Fenerbahçe, in a 2–1 win against Sivasspor. He then helped the club keep five consecutive clean sheets between 20 February 2016 and 3 April 2016. Kjær, once again, helped Fenerbahçe keep four consecutive clean sheets between 20 April 2016 and 5 May 2016, including helping the side reach the final of the Turkish Cup by beating Konyaspor 5–0 on aggregate and scoring his second goal of the season, in a 3–0 win against Gaziantepspor. He then started in the final against rivals, Galatasaray, as they lost 1–0. Despite being sidelined on three more occasions later in the 2015–16 season, Kjær made 45 appearances and scoring two times in all competitions.

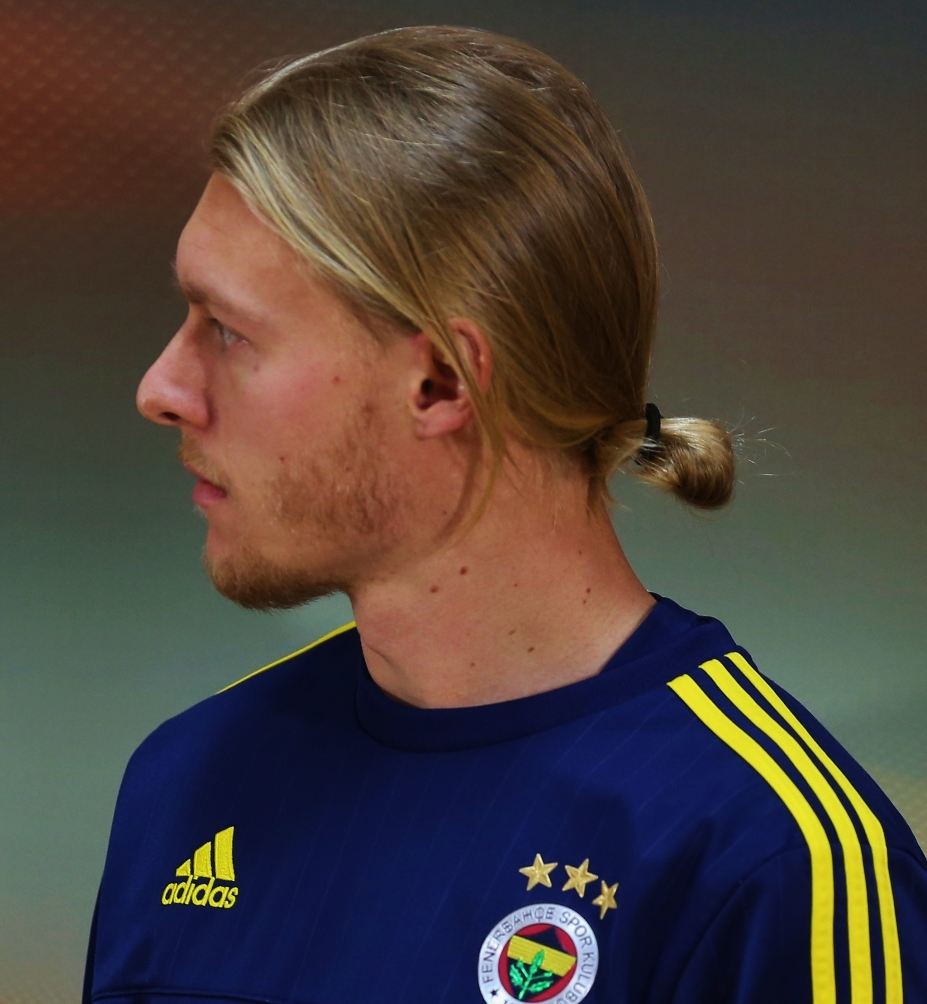
Kjær training with Fenerbahçe in 2016

At the start of the 2016–17 season, Kjær captained in both legs of the UEFA Champions League third round qualifying round against AS Monaco, losing 4–3 on aggregate. In a match against Kayserispor on 28 August 2016, he scored Fenerbahçe's first goal of the game but was sent off for a straight red card nine minutes later, as the club drew 3–3. After serving a one match suspension, Kjær scored on his return in the UEFA Europa League match against Zorya Luhansk on 15 September 2016. Since returning from suspension, he continued to regain his first team place, playing in the centre-back position. Two months later on 24 November 2016, Kjær scored against Zorya Luhansk in the UEFA Europa League match, as the club won 2–0. He then helped the club keep two consecutive clean sheets on two separate occasions throughout December. However, later in the 2016–17 season, Kjær was plagued with injuries on five occasions. Despite this, he continued to be involved in the first team for Fenerbahçe. In his second season at the club, Kjær went on to make 43 appearances and scoring three times in all competitions.

=== Sevilla ===
As a result of Fenerbahçe's ban from playing European football next season, this led Kjær wanting to leave the club as a result. On 2 August 2017, Kjær joined Spanish side Sevilla, signing a four-year deal for a transfer fee of €12,500,000.

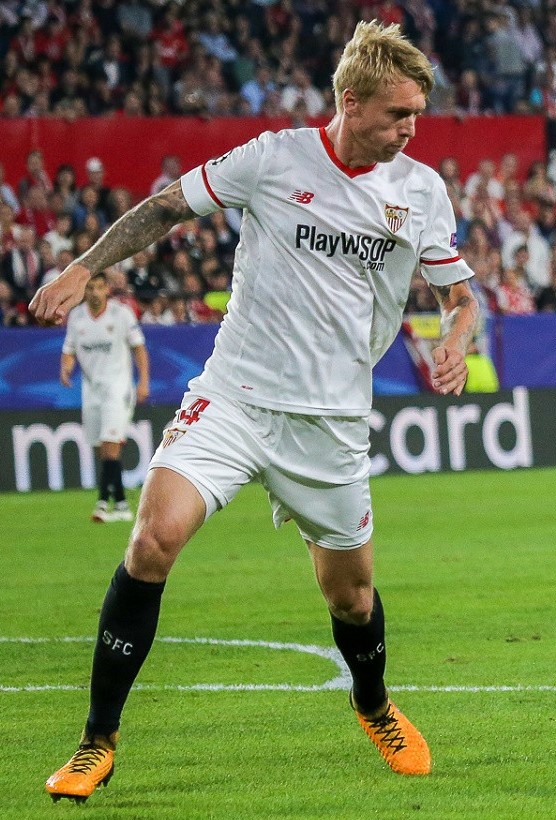
Kjær attempting to make a tackle during a match against Spartak Moscow in 2017

Kjær made his Sevilla debut in the opening game of the season, starting the whole game, in a 1–1 draw against RCD Espanyol. By September, he was sidelined with injuries on two occasions. Kjær then scored his first goal for the club, in a 5–1 loss against Spartak Moscow on 17 October 2017. He became a first team regular for the next two months, playing in the centre–back position. This lasted until Kjær injured his left abductor muscle while training and missed three matches as a result. On 6 December 2017, he returned to the starting line-up against Maribor and helped the club draw 1–1. In the first leg of the Copa Del Rey Round of 16, Kjær set up the club's second goal of the game, in a 2–1 win. Three days later on 6 January 2018, he scored his first league goal for Sevilla, in a 5–3 loss against rivals, Real Betis. However, Kjær suffered a back injury that kept him out for a month. On 28 February 2018, he returned to the starting line-up against Málaga and helped the club keep a clean sheet, in a 1–0 win. Kjær started in the next five matches for Sevilla since returning from injury and proved to be instrumental as he helped the club beat Manchester United in the second leg of the UEFA Champions League Round of 16. However, during a 4–0 loss against Celta Vigo on 7 April 2018, Kjær suffered a knee injury and was substituted in the 40th minute. On 12 May 2018, he returned to the starting line–up against rivals, Real Betis, and scored his second league goal of the season, in a 2–2 draw, a result that guaranteed Sevilla's qualification of playing European football next season. At the end of the 2017–18 season, Kjær made 27 appearances and scoring three times in all competitions. Following this, he reflected on his first season at the club, saying: "Personally, it has been a strange year ... Next year I will continue to improve. Not having injuries would be a great help."

At the start of the 2018–19 season, Kjær started the whole game in the Supercopa de España against Barcelona, as Sevilla lost 2–1. He regained his first team place, playing in the centre-back position, for the club. This lasted until a match against SD Huesca on 28 October 2018 when Kjær suffered a hamstring injury in the 24th minute and was substituted as Sevilla won 2–1. Following this, it was announced that he would be sidelined for a month. On 25 November 2018, Kjær returned to the starting line-up against Real Valladolid and kept a clean sheet, in a 1–0 win. He continued to found in and out of the starting line-up despite being plagued by injuries as the 2018–19 season progressed. Despite this, Kjær made 37 appearances in all competitions. Following this, it was expected that he'll be leaving Sevilla ahead of the 2019–20 season.

==== Loan to Atalanta ====
On 1 September 2019, Kjær was loaned to Atalanta.

Kjær made his Atalanta debut, starting the whole game, in a 2–0 win against Roma on 24 September 2019. He then appeared four more times throughout October. However, just like Martin Škrtel (his former teammate at Fenerbahçe who signed and terminated his contract with Atalanta within August 2019), he failed to convince the team's head coach Gian Piero Gasperini. As a result, the club chose to terminate the loan deal six months ahead of expiration.

=== AC Milan and retirement ===
On 13 January 2020, Kjær signed with AC Milan on loan for the rest of the 2019–20 season, with the option to make the transfer permanent for an undisclosed sum. He had been linked with the club in the late 2000s and early 2010s during his time with Palermo and even praised in the media by then-current Milan's head coach Carlo Ancelotti yet the move eventually broke down as two clubs failed to agree on his transfer fee. Desiring to pick up a squad number that would have number 4 in it, Kjær chose 24 that once belonged to fellow Danish international defender Martin Laursen who played for Milan from 2001 to 2004. He also became the first Dane to play for the club since 2005, when Jon Dahl Tomasson transferred out.

On 15 January 2020, Kjær made his debut for the club, playing for 82 minutes in a home 3–0 win against S.P.A.L. in the round of 16 of the Coppa Italia. Four days later, he played his first game in Serie A as a Milan player in a dramatic 3–2 home win against Udinese. After missing one match due to illness, Kjær returned to the starting line-up, playing in the centre–back position, losing 4–2 against rivals, Inter Milan on 9 February 2020. However, his return was short–lived when he torn his muscle injury and was substituted in the 44th minute, in a 1–0 win against Torino on 17 February 2020. After the match, it was announced that Kjær would be out of action for a few months. Due to the COVID-19 pandemic which resulted in the suspension of League matches, he managed to recover from his injury and returned to the starting line-up in the second leg of the Coppa Italia semi-finals against Juventus; the club drew 0–0, resulting in Milan's elimination from the tournament. In his debut season under head coach Stefano Pioli, Kjær would compete with other central defenders, namely Mateo Musacchio, Léo Duarte, and Matteo Gabbia, for a starting line-up spot in the team's back four alongside left central defender and captain Alessio Romagnoli. He would make 11 more appearances for Milan (9 in Serie A and 4 in Coppa Italia) before the club bought him out from Sevilla for €3.5 million on 15 July 2020, the expiry date of the buy-out clause in his loan deal.

On 15 July 2020, Kjær signed a permanent deal with Milan until 30 June 2022. On 11 March 2021, Kjær scored his first goal for the Rossoneri in a 1–1 away draw against Manchester United in the first leg of the Europa League round of 16 tie.

On 27 October 2021, Kjær extended his contract with Milan until 2024. On 1 December, in the opening minutes of the Serie A away game against Genoa, Kjær sustained an injury to his left knee and had to be stretchered off the pitch. After surgery on the anterior cruciate ligament, he was ruled out for six months.

On 22 May 2022, as Milan won 3–1 against Sassuolo at the Stadio Città del Tricolore, Kjær became the Serie A champion with the rest of the team, helping the club win its first major silverware in 11 years as well as winning the first major trophy in his own entire career.

On 21 May 2024, AC Milan announced that Kjær would leave the club after his contract expired ahead of the last game of the season, a home game against Salernitana.

On 13 January 2025, after spending six months as a free agent, Kjær officially announced his retirement from professional football at 35 years old.

== International career ==
Kjær made his only appearance for Denmark U18 on 19 September 2006, in a 4–1 win against Slovakia U18. He made his debut for the Denmark national under-19 football team on 6 September 2006, at the age of 17, beating Portugal U19 3–2. He played a total 10 games and scored one goal for the under-19s until October 2007, and was named 2007 Danish under-19 talent of the year as the under-19s coach found Kjær had shown himself a talented defender despite his young age. Following his breakthrough with Midtjylland, Kjær was rested from the under-19s in March 2008 to avoid wearing him out.

Kjær was called up for the Denmark national under-21 football team in May 2008 as a replacement for Michael Jakobsen, making his debut in a 0–4 defeat against the Germany under-21s. He was out of the under-21 team during his first time at Palermo, but was recalled in October 2008, spending the game as an unused substitute to Magnus Troest and Mathias Jørgensen. Kjær was an unused substitute for the friendly match against Greece, and returned to the under-21s for a single game in March 2009, playing well enough that under-21 coach Keld Bordinggaard recommended him for a recall to Olsen's squad. He went on to make two appearances for the U21 side.

Kjær made his only Denmark U20, coming against France U20 on 19 November 2008.

=== Senior team ===
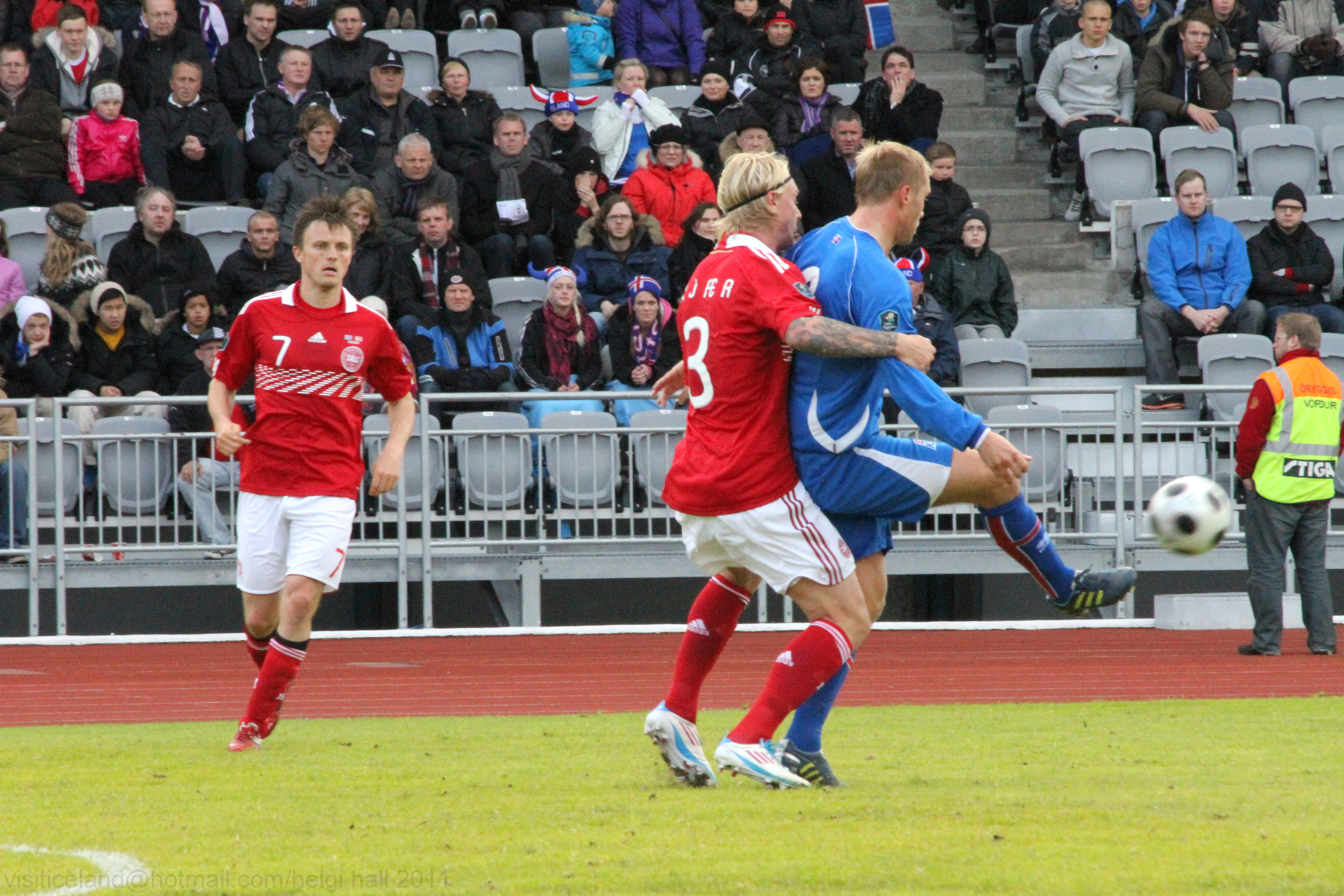
Kjær marking Eiður Guðjohnsen during a match between Denmark and Iceland in 2011

Kjær was called up to the senior Danish national team in February 2009, as national team coach Morten Olsen was impressed by his form for Palermo, and saw him and Per Krøldrup as main competitors to replace the retired defender Martin Laursen.

Kjær was once again a part of the senior squad for the 2010 FIFA World Cup qualification game against Sweden on 6 June 2009 after Per Krøldrup was unavailable due to injury. He played the full game despite an injury of his own, as Denmark won 1–0. Kjær established himself in the Danish starting line-up, played the following three qualification games, and helped Denmark qualify for the 2010 World Cup despite facing injury along the way. For the September 2009 qualification game against Portugal, Kjær told reporters that Cristiano Ronaldo should be stopped by a series of small fouls and one hard tackle. This prompted a complaint to FIFA by the Portuguese Football Federation requesting Kjær be suspended for unsportsman-like conduct, but the case was dropped following the mediation of the Danish Football Association.

On 28 May 2010, Denmark coach Morten Olsen announced that the player would be part of the final squad of 23 participating in the 2010 FIFA World Cup in South Africa. Kjær was in the starting eleven in Denmark's first two games, against the Netherlands and Cameroon, where he received a yellow card in both games and therefore missed the third and crucial group game against Japan. However, in the match against Cameroon, Kjær was highly praised for his excellent long-range passing which helped to set up Nicklas Bendtner's first goal. Despite, his performance in the World Cup was praised by the media and Samuel Eto'o, himself. He said playing in the tournament benefited him, claiming it has strengthened him a lot.

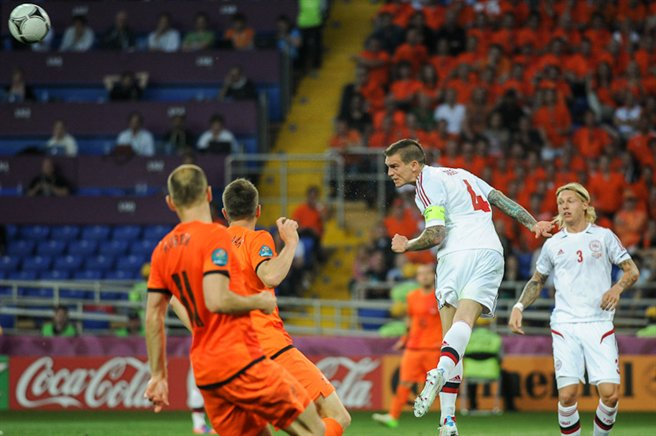
Kjær (right) looking on as Daniel Agger attempts to take a header against the Netherlands at UEFA Euro 2012

Following Denmark's win over Iceland in the UEFA Euro 2012 qualifying, Stig Tøfting criticised his performance, as he witnessed him for making too many mistakes during the match. This led to Kjær responded and criticised Tøfting saying: "These statements hit me personally! It is the first time that I have come under pressure and I try to take these words as a motivation. I am not happy about his (Tøfting's) opinion. He just says that to stay in the public attention. He should be serious!" Tøfting continued to remain critical of the player, criticising him once again throughout his Denmark's career. The next two years saw the player regaining his first team place for the national side and helped them qualify for the UEFA Euro 2012 following their 2–1 win against Portugal on 11 October 2011. In May 2012, he was inducted in the final squad for Euro 2012. Kjær was among the starting 11 in each of the three group games, against the Netherlands, Portugal and Germany, as they were eliminated in the group stage.

Following the end of the UEFA Euro 2012 tournament, Kjær appeared four more times by the end of the year. On 22 March 2013, he scored his first goal for Denmark, in a 3–0 win against Czech Republic for the 2014 FIFA World Cup qualification. However, Kjær sat out the remaining matches of the qualification, as the national side failed to earn a place in the World Cup after finishing second place.

Following Denmark's unsuccessful qualification at the World Cup, Kjær regained his place for the national side. He then scored his second Denmark's goal, in a 3–1 win against Serbia in the UEFA Euro 2016 qualification on 14 November 2014. Kjær then helped the national side keep three consecutive clean sheets between 13 June 2015 and 7 September 2015 against Serbia, Albania and Armenia. In the UEFA Euro 2016 qualifying play-offs against Sweden, Kjær played in both legs, as he failed to help Denmark qualify for the UEFA Euro 2016 following a 4–3 defeat on aggregate.

Following the national side's unsuccessful qualification to the UEFA Euro 2016, Kjær captained Denmark for the first time in his career against Bosnia and Herzegovina on 3 June 2016, as Denmark lost, 4–3, in a penalty shootout after playing 120 minutes, in a 2–2 draw. Following the retirement of Daniel Agger, it was announced he would succeed him as the national side's captain. Once again, Kjær helped the national side keep three consecutive clean sheets between 7 June 2016 and 4 September 2016 against Bulgaria, Liechtenstein and Armenia. He then helped Denmark finish second place in the Group E of the FIFA World Cup qualification. Kjær played in both legs of the World Cup play-offs for a place in the World Cup against Republic of Ireland, as the national side won 5–1 on aggregate and qualified for the 2018 FIFA World Cup. He helped the national side keep four consecutive clean sheets in friendly matches between 22 March 2018 and 9 June 2018 against Panama, Chile, Sweden and Mexico. In May 2018, Kjær was named in Denmark's 23-man squad for the 2018 FIFA World Cup in Russia. He served as Denmark's captain at the 2018 FIFA World Cup. Kjær captained his first World Cup match against Peru and helped the national side win 1–0 on 16 June 2018. He helped the national side reach the knockout stage following a draw against Australia and France. Denmark ultimately progressed from their group after which they were drawn with Croatia in the Round of 16. There they were defeated after a penalty shoot-out, with Kjær being one of the two players to have his spot-kick successfully converted.

Following the World Cup, Kjær captained three more matches for the national side's matches by the end of the year and helping them keep three consecutive clean sheets against Wales, Republic of Ireland and Austria. He then played an important role for Denmark by setting up two goals, in a 5–1 win against Georgia on 10 June 2019. This was followed up by keeping four consecutive clean sheets against Gibraltar, Georgia, Switzerland, Luxembourg and Gibraltar. Kjær captained the side against Republic of Ireland on 18 November 2019 and helped Denmark to qualify for UEFA Euro 2020. On 14 October 2020, Kjær played his 100th match for Denmark in a 1–0 away win against England.

He captained the side for the UEFA Euro 2020. On 12 June 2021, while playing their opening match against Finland, when Christian Eriksen collapsed on the pitch, Kjær was the first to help him and summon the medical team to quickly get onto the pitch. He also made sure that Eriksen's airways stayed unobstructed when he was unconscious. Afterwards, he guided his teammates to cover Eriksen while he received medical treatment, and consoled Eriksen's wife Sabrina afterward. Eriksen was taken off the pitch on a stretcher and the match was suspended. Around an hour after the incident, UEFA and Danish Football Association officials confirmed from the Rigshospitalet that Eriksen had been stabilized and was awake. The match re-commenced later that evening, resulting in 1–0 victory for Finland. Despite the opening loss, Denmark went on to advance to the semi-finals of the UEFA Euro 2020 losing to England in extra time. On 27 August 2021 Kjær was awarded the UEFA President's Award together with the medical team that stabilized Eriksen at the Finland game.

On 22 August 2024, Kjær announced his retirement from international football. He scored five goals in 132 international appearances.

== Personal life ==
In addition to speaking Danish, Kjær speaks five languages, including English and Italian (having learnt the language from his time at Palermo). Growing up, he idolised John Terry and Fabio Cannavaro and supported Liverpool. While his father was supportive of him becoming a footballer, his mother, a teacher, was not.

Despite not liking studying while attending school, Kjær was able to receive his diploma. He married his long-term girlfriend, Camilla. They have known each other since they were fifteen. However they divorced and later Kjær began a relationship with Elina Gollert, a Swedish national. Together, they have two children, Milas and Viggo. In the summer of 2017, they were married.

Kjær talked about superstitions, saying: "I am a believer but not a practitioner. The first sock I wear is always the right one. But not just before every game. I do it every morning."

== Career statistics ==
=== Club ===
Appearances and goals by club, season and competition
Club	Season	League			National cup (Note: Includes Danish Cup, Coppa Italia, DFB-Pokal, Coupe de France, Turkish Cup, Copa del Rey)		Europe		Other		Total	
Club	Season	Division	Apps	Goals	Apps	Goals	Apps	Goals	Apps	Goals	Apps	Goals
Midtjylland	2007–08	Danish Superliga	19	0	2	0	—		—		21	0
Palermo	2008–09	Serie A	27	3	0	0	—		—		27	3
Palermo	2009–10	Serie A	35	2	3	0	—		—		38	2
Palermo	Total		62	5	3	0	—		—		65	5
VfL Wolfsburg	2010–11	Bundesliga	32	1	2	0	—		—		34	1
VfL Wolfsburg	2011–12	Bundesliga	3	0	1	0	—		—		4	0
VfL Wolfsburg	2012–13	Bundesliga	22	2	3	0	—		—		25	2
VfL Wolfsburg	Total		57	3	6	0	—		—		63	3
Roma (loan)	2011–12	Serie A	22	0	2	0	—		—		24	0
Lille	2013–14	Ligue 1	35	0	2	1	—		—		37	1
Lille	2014–15	Ligue 1	31	1	2	1	9 (Note: Four appearances in UEFA Champions League, five appearances and one goal in UEFA Europa League)	1	—		42	3
Lille	Total		66	1	4	2	9	1	—		79	4
Fenerbahçe	2015–16	Süper Lig	28	2	6	0	11 (Note: Two appearances in UEFA Champions League, nine appearances in UEFA Europa League)	0	—		45	2
Fenerbahçe	2016–17	Süper Lig	27	1	5	0	11 (Note: Two appearances in UEFA Champions League, nine appearances and two goals in UEFA Europa League)	2	—		43	3
Fenerbahçe	Total		55	3	11	0	22	2	—		88	5
Sevilla	2017–18	La Liga	20	2	1	0	6 (Note: Appearance(s) in UEFA Champions League)	1	—		27	3
Sevilla	2018–19	La Liga	26	0	3	0	7 (Note: Appearances in UEFA Europa League)	0	1 (Note: Appearance in Supercopa de España)	0	37	0
Sevilla	Total		46	2	4	0	13	1	1	0	64	3
Atalanta (loan)	2019–20	Serie A	5	0	0	0	1	0	—		6	0
Milan (loan)	2019–20	Serie A	15	0	4	0	—		—		19	0
Milan	2020–21	Serie A	28	0	1	0	10	1	—		39	1
Milan	2021–22	Serie A	11	0	0	0	3	0	—		14	0
Milan	2022–23	Serie A	17	0	0	0	6	0	1 (Note: Appearance in Supercoppa Italiana)	0	24	0
Milan	2023–24	Serie A	20	0	1	0	4 (Note: One appearance in UEFA Champions League, three appearances in UEFA Europa League)	0	—		25	0
Milan	Total		91	0	6	0	23	1	1	0	121	1
Career total			422	14	39	2	68	5	2	0	531	21

=== International ===
Appearances and goals by national team and year
National team	Year	Apps	Goals
Denmark	2009	7	0
Denmark	2010	8	0
Denmark	2011	6	0
Denmark	2012	10	0
Denmark	2013	7	1
Denmark	2014	8	1
Denmark	2015	10	0
Denmark	2016	10	1
Denmark	2017	8	0
Denmark	2018	11	0
Denmark	2019	10	0
Denmark	2020	7	0
Denmark	2021	17	2
Denmark	2022	3	0
Denmark	2023	8	0
Denmark	2024	2	0
Total		132	5

Scores and results list Denmark's goal tally first.

List of international goals scored by Simon Kjær
No.	Date	Venue	Opponent	Score	Result	Competition
1.	22 March 2013	Andrův stadion, Olomouc, Czech Republic	Czech Republic	2–0	3–0	2014 FIFA World Cup qualification
2.	14 November 2014	Partizan Stadium, Belgrade, Serbia	Serbia	2–1	3–1	UEFA Euro 2016 qualification
3.	3 June 2016	Toyota Stadium, Toyota, Japan	Bosnia and Herzegovina	1–0	2–2 (3–4 p)	2016 Kirin Cup
4.	7 September 2021	Parken Stadium, Copenhagen, Denmark	Israel	2–0	5–0	2022 FIFA World Cup qualification
5.	9 October 2021	Zimbru Stadium, Chișinău, Moldova	Moldova	2–0	4–0	2022 FIFA World Cup qualification

== Honours ==
AC Milan

- Serie A: 2021–22

Individual

- Danish Talent of the Year: 2009
- Danish Player of the Year: 2009, 2021
- The Guardian Footballer of the Year: 2021
- Ballon d'Or nominee: 2021

== See also ==
- List of men's footballers with 100 or more international caps
