= Pelle Jensen =

German footballer

Personal information
- Full name: Pelle Jensen
- Date of birth: 24 May 1992 (age 34)
- Place of birth: Hamburg, Germany
- Height: 1.93 m (6 ft 4 in)
- Position: Defender

Senior career*
Years	Team	Apps	(Gls)
2010–2012	FC Hansa Rostock	1	(0)
2010–2012	FC Hansa Rostock II	4	(0)
2012–2016	TSG 1899 Hoffenheim II	50	(1)
2012	TSG 1899 Hoffenheim	2	(0)
- * Club domestic league appearances and goals as of 29 June 2015

Pelle Jensen is a German Association football player who played as a defender for TSG 1899 Hoffenheim II.

== Career ==
=== Youth in Rostock ===
Jensen moved with his parents to the Rostock area at the age of five, where he began playing football in 1998, joining SG Warnow-Papendorf from Papendorf. Two years later, he transferred to local rivals Hansa Rostock, where he progressed through all of their youth teams. Jensen was part of the Rostock U-17 team when they participated as founding members in the newly established U-17 Bundesliga during the 2007/08 season. With 23 appearances out of 26, he was one of the key players on the team, which brought him to the attention of the German Football Association (DFB). He was called up to the U-16 national team and made his debut in a friendly match against France on May 29, 2008, alongside his club teammate Tommy Grupe in central defense.

In the following 2008/09 season, Jensen was limited to only eight appearances due to injury and was not considered for the national team. In the 2009/10 season, Jensen moved up to the A-youth team and played in the A-Junior Bundesliga, where he made 16 appearances under coach Michael Hartmann. His performances earned him a place in the DFB's U-18 team, where he made five appearances, some of which as team captain. With Rostock, he won the A-Junior Bundesliga North/Northeast championship, securing qualification for the final stage of the German Youth Championship. However, due to injury, he was unable to play in the semifinals against Mainz or the final against Leverkusen, which Hansa won 1-0, claiming their first national youth title since reunification.

=== Beginnings at Hansa Rostock ===
In the 2010/11 season, Jensen continued to play for Rostock's U-19 team, now coached by Roland Kroos, and also earned a spot in the U-19 national team. However, when the professional team, which had been relegated to the 3. Liga in the 2010/11 season, suffered injuries to regular center-backs Matthias Holst and Stephan Gusche, the 18-year-old Jensen was called up to the senior squad under coach Peter Vollmann, alongside 17-year-old Tom Trybull. While Trybull soon made his debut in the 3. Liga, Jensen remained on the bench. To gain match experience, he was loaned to Rostock's reserve team, which played in the fifth-tier Oberliga Nordost, on November 7, 2010. Jensen also appeared in the Mecklenburg-Vorpommern Cup for the first team, making his debut on February 23, 2011, in a match against Rostocker FC. His second appearance for the professional team came on May 14, 2011, in the final league match against Ahlen, where he came on as a substitute.

In June 2011, Jensen graduated from the CJD Jugenddorf-Christophorusschule Rostock with a final grade of 1.0. However, his sporting development took a less successful turn in the following year: during the entire 2011/12 season, Jensen did not make any appearances for Rostock's first team under coach Vollmann or his successor Wolfgang Wolf, and instead played exclusively for the reserve team in the Oberliga. Some media outlets speculated that his exclusion from the first team was due to a possible transfer to TSG Hoffenheim in the summer of 2012, a move that had been rumored in the spring of 2012. While the second-division team was relegated to the 3. Liga at the end of the season, Jensen's reserve team won the Oberliga Nordost title.

=== Jensen at 1899 Hoffenheim ===
In May 2012, Hoffenheim announced Jensen's signing for their second team, which played in the fourth-tier Regionalliga in the 2012/13 season. He immediately became a regular starter in central defense.

On November 10, 2012, during the 11th match day of the 2012/13 Bundesliga season, Jensen made his debut for Hoffenheim's first team in a 1-1 away draw against Fortuna Düsseldorf, as four center-backs from the first team were injured. Jensen stayed in the first team and started in the next home match against VfL Wolfsburg, his second and final Bundesliga appearance. He returned to the second team, and a difficult period began for him due to severe injuries to both ankles, leading to almost a year of rehabilitation. He ultimately ended his professional career after his contract with Hoffenheim expired in 2016 and began studying medicine at LMU Munich.
