= 2015–16 in English football =

Football in England
- Season: 2015–16

Men's football
- Premier League: Leicester City
- Championship: Burnley
- League One: Wigan Athletic
- League Two: Northampton Town
- National League: Cheltenham Town
- FA Cup: Manchester United
- EFL Trophy: Barnsley
- League Cup: Manchester City
- Community Shield: Arsenal

Women's football
- WSL 1: Manchester City
- WSL 2: Yeovil Town
- FA Women's Premier League: Brighton & Hove Albion
- Women's FA Cup: Arsenal
- WSL Cup: Manchester City

The 2015–16 season was the 136th season of competitive association football in England.

== Promotion and relegation ==
=== Pre-season ===
| League Division | Promoted to league ▲ | Relegated from league ▼ |
|---|---|---|
| Premier League | Bournemouth ▲; Watford ▲; Norwich City ▲ | Hull City ▼; Burnley ▼; QPR ▼ |
| Championship | Bristol City ▲; MK Dons ▲; Preston North End ▲ | Millwall ▼; Wigan Athletic ▼; Blackpool ▼ |
| League One | Burton Albion ▲; Shrewsbury Town ▲; Bury ▲; Southend United ▲ | Notts County ▼; Crawley Town ▼; Leyton Orient ▼; Yeovil Town ▼ |
| League Two | Barnet ▲; Bristol Rovers ▲ | Cheltenham Town ▼; Tranmere Rovers ▼ |
| National League | Barrow ▲; Guiseley ▲; Bromley ▲; Boreham Wood ▲ | Alfreton Town ▼; Dartford ▼; AFC Telford United ▼; Nuneaton ▼ |

== New clubs ==
- Hereford F.C., a new club formed and owned by fans of defunct Hereford United F.C. were accepted into the Midland Football League Premier Division (Level 9)
- Hackney Wick F.C., a new club founded in mid-2015 by Robert "Bobby" Kasanga, a non-league footballer since there were very few football clubs located within the Hackney Wick area, Kasanga proposed to others the formation of a community-based club. They were accepted into the Middlesex County Football League Division One Central & East (Level 12).

== National teams ==
=== England national football team ===
==== UEFA Euro 2016 qualifying ====
| Pos | Team | Pld | W | D | L | GF | GA | GD | Pts | Qualification | (England) | (Switzerland) | (Slovenia) | (Estonia) | (Lithuania) | (San Marino) |
|---|---|---|---|---|---|---|---|---|---|---|---|---|---|---|---|---|
| 1 | England | 10 | 10 | 0 | 0 | 31 | 3 | +28 | 30 | Qualify for final tournament | — | 2–0 | 3–1 | 2–0 | 4–0 | 5–0 |
| 2 | Switzerland | 10 | 7 | 0 | 3 | 24 | 8 | +16 | 21 | Qualify for final tournament | 0–2 | — | 3–2 | 3–0 | 4–0 | 7–0 |
| 3 | Slovenia | 10 | 5 | 1 | 4 | 18 | 11 | +7 | 16 | Advance to play-offs | 2–3 | 1–0 | — | 1–0 | 1–1 | 6–0 |
| 4 | Estonia | 10 | 3 | 1 | 6 | 4 | 9 | −5 | 10 (Note: Tied on head-to-head results. Overall goal difference was used as the tiebreaker.) | | 0–1 | 0–1 | 1–0 | — | 1–0 | 2–0 |
| 5 | Lithuania | 10 | 3 | 1 | 6 | 7 | 18 | −11 | 10 | | 0–3 | 1–2 | 0–2 | 1–0 | — | 2–1 |
| 6 | San Marino | 10 | 0 | 1 | 9 | 1 | 36 | −35 | 1 | | 0–6 | 0–4 | 0–2 | 0–0 | 0–2 | — |

Source: UEFA
Rules for classification: Qualification tiebreakers
Notes:

| 14 June 2015 Euro 2016 qualifying | Slovenia | 2–3 | England | Ljubljana, Slovenia |
| 17:00 BST | Novaković 37'; Pečnik 84'; Ilić (yellow card) 58'; Kampl (yellow card) 90+2' | Report | Wilshere 57', 73'; Rooney 86' | Stadium: Stadion Stožice; Referee: Alberto Undiano Mallenco (Spain) |

| 5 September 2015 Euro 2016 qualifying | San Marino | 0–6 | England | Serravalle, San Marino |
| 17:00 BST | Beradi (yellow card) 12' | Report | Rooney 13' (pen.); Brolli 30' (o.g.); Barkley 46'; Walcott 67', 78'; Kane 77' | Stadium: Stadio Olimpico; Attendance: 4,378; Referee: Leontios Trattou (Cyprus) |

| 8 September 2015 Euro 2016 qualifying | England | 2–0 | Switzerland | London, England |
| 19:45 BST | Kane 67'; Rooney 84' (pen.); Milner (yellow card) 28'; Smalling (yellow card) 71' | Report | | Stadium: Wembley Stadium; Attendance: 75,751; Referee: Gianluca Rocchi (Italy) |

| 9 October 2015 Euro 2016 qualifying | England | 2–0 | Estonia | London, England |
| 19:45 BST | Walcott 45'; Sterling 85' | Report | Pikk (yellow card) 73' | Stadium: Wembley Stadium; Attendance: 75,427; Referee: Istvan Vad (Hungary) |

| 12 October 2015 Euro 2016 qualifying | Lithuania | 0–3 | England | Vilnius, Lithuania |
| 19:45 BST | Spalvis (yellow card) 84'; Vaitkunas (yellow card) 89' | Report | Barkley 29'; Arlaiskis 35' (o.g.); Oxlade-Chamberlain 62'; Shelvey (yellow card) 78'; Vardy (yellow card) 79' | Stadium: LFF Stadium; Referee: Kenn Hansen (Denmark) |

==== UEFA Euro 2016 ====
11 June 2016
21:00

| England | 1–1 | Russia |
|---|---|---|
| Dier 73' | Report | V. Berezutski 90+2' |

Stade Vélodrome, Marseille
Attendance: 62,343
Referee: Nicola Rizzoli (Italy)
16 June 2016
15:00

| England | 2–1 | Wales |
|---|---|---|
| Vardy 56'; Sturridge 90+2' | Report | Bale 42' |

Stade Bollaert-Delelis, Lens
Attendance: 34,033
Referee: Felix Brych (Germany)
20 June 2016
21:00

| Slovakia | 0–0 | England |
|---|---|---|
| | Report |

Stade Geoffroy-Guichard, Saint-Étienne
Attendance: 39,051
Referee: Carlos Velasco Carballo (Spain)
27 June 2016
21:00

| England | 1–2 | Iceland |
|---|---|---|
| Rooney 4' (pen.) | Report | R. Sigurðsson 6'; Sigþórsson 18' |

Stade de Nice, Nice
Attendance: 33,901
Referee: Damir Skomina (Slovenia)

==== Friendlies ====
| 7 June 2015 Friendly | Republic of Ireland | 0–0 | England | Dublin, Ireland |
| 13:00 BST | McCarthy (yellow card) 44' | Report | | Stadium: Aviva Stadium; Attendance: 43,486; Referee: Arnold Hunter (Northern Ireland) |

| 13 November 2015 Friendly | Spain | 2–0 | England | Alicante, Spain |
| 20:00 GMT | Mario 72'; Cazorla 84' | Report | Hart (yellow card) 85' | Stadium: Estadio José Rico Pérez; Attendance: 28,000; Referee: Paolo Mazzoleni (Italy) |

| 17 November 2015 Friendly | England | 2–0 | France | London, England |
| 20:00 GMT | Alli 39'; Rooney 48' | Report | | Stadium: Wembley Stadium; Attendance: 71,223; Referee: Jonas Eriksson (Sweden) |

| 26 March 2016 Friendly | Germany | 2–3 | England | Berlin, Germany |
| 19:45 GMT | Kroos 43'; Gómez 57' | Report | Kane 61'; Vardy 74'; Dier 90+1' | Stadium: Olympiastadion; Attendance: 73,779; Referee: Gianluca Rocchi (Italy) |

=== England women's national football team ===
==== 2015 FIFA Women's World Cup ====
===== Group stage =====
| Pos | Team | Pld | W | D | L | GF | GA | GD | Pts | Qualification |
|---|---|---|---|---|---|---|---|---|---|---|
| 1 | France | 3 | 2 | 0 | 1 | 6 | 2 | +4 | 6 | Advance to knockout stage |
| 2 | England | 3 | 2 | 0 | 1 | 4 | 3 | +1 | 6 | Advance to knockout stage |
| 3 | Colombia | 3 | 1 | 1 | 1 | 4 | 3 | +1 | 4 | Advance to knockout stage |
| 4 | Mexico | 3 | 0 | 1 | 2 | 2 | 8 | −6 | 1 | |

Source: FIFA
Rules for classification: Group stage tiebreakers

| 9 June 2015 2015 FIFA Women's World Cup Group F | France | 1–0 | England | Moncton, Canada |
| 17:00 BST | Le Sommer 29' | Report | | Stadium: Moncton Stadium; Attendance: 11,686; Referee: Efthalia Mitsi |

| 13 June 2015 2015 FIFA Women's World Cup Group F | England | 2–1 | Mexico | Moncton, Canada |
| 20:00 BST | Kirby 71'; Carney 82' (yellow card) 90+2' | Report | Ibarra 90+1'; Garciamendez (yellow card) 64' | Stadium: Moncton Stadium; Attendance: 13,138; Referee: Anna-Marie Keighley |

| 17 June 2015 2015 FIFA Women's World Cup Group F | England | 2–1 | Colombia | Montreal, Canada |
| 20:00 BST | Carney 15'; Williams 38' (pen.); Scott (yellow card) 66' | Report | Andrade 90+3'; Arias (yellow card) 35'; Usme (yellow card) 36'; Sepúlveda (yellow card) 84' | Stadium: Olympic Stadium; Attendance: 11,450; Referee: Carol Anne Chenard |

===== Knockout rounds =====
| 22 June 2015 2015 FIFA Women's World Cup Round of 16 | Norway | 1–2 | England | Ottawa, Canada |
| 21:00 BST | Gulbrandsen 54' | Report | Houghton 61'; Bronze 76' | Stadium: Lansdowne Park; Attendance: 19,829; Referee: Esther Staubli |

| 27 June 2015 2015 FIFA Women's World Cup Quarter Final | England | 2–1 | Canada | Vancouver, Canada |
| 00:30 BST | Taylor 11'; Bronze 14'; Moore (yellow card) 63' | Report | Sinclair 42'; Sesselmann (yellow card) 90+3' | Stadium: BC Place; Attendance: 54,027; Referee: Claudia Umpierrez |

| 1 July 2015 2015 FIFA Women's World Cup Semi-Final | Japan | 2–1 | England | Edmonton, Canada |
| 00:00 BST | Miyama 33' (pen.); Bassett 90+2' (o.g.); Ōgimi (yellow card) 90' | Report | Williams 40' (pen.); Rafferty (yellow card) 31' | Stadium: Commonwealth Stadium; Attendance: 31,467; Referee: Anna-Marie Keighley |

| 4 July 2015 2015 FIFA Women's World Cup Third Place Play-Off | Germany | 0–1 (a.e.t.) | England | Edmonton, Canada |
| 00:00 BST | | Report | Williams 108' (pen.); Chapman (yellow card) 77'; Bardsley (yellow card) 83'; Bassett (yellow card) 92' | Stadium: Commonwealth Stadium; Attendance: 21,483; Referee: Ri Hyang-ok |

==== 2017 UEFA Women's European Championship qualification ====
===== Group 7 =====
| Pos | Team | Pld | W | D | L | GF | GA | GD | Pts | Qualification | England | Belgium | Serbia | Bosnia and Herzegovina | Estonia |
|---|---|---|---|---|---|---|---|---|---|---|---|---|---|---|---|
| 1 | England | 8 | 7 | 1 | 0 | 32 | 1 | +31 | 22 | Final tournament | — | 1–1 | 7–0 | 1–0 | 5–0 |
| 2 | Belgium | 8 | 5 | 2 | 1 | 27 | 5 | +22 | 17 | Final tournament | 0–2 | — | 1–1 | 6–0 | 6–0 |
| 3 | Serbia | 8 | 3 | 1 | 4 | 10 | 21 | −11 | 10 | | 0–7 | 1–3 | — | 0–1 | 3–0 |
| 4 | Bosnia and Herzegovina | 8 | 3 | 0 | 5 | 8 | 17 | −9 | 9 | | 0–1 | 0–5 | 2–4 | — | 4–0 |
| 5 | Estonia | 8 | 0 | 0 | 8 | 0 | 33 | −33 | 0 | | 0–8 | 0–5 | 0–1 | 0–1 | — |

Source: UEFA

== UEFA competitions ==
=== 2015–16 UEFA Champions League ===
==== Play-off round ====
| Team 1 | Agg. | Team 2 | 1st leg | 2nd leg |
|---|---|---|---|---|
| Manchester United (England) | 7–1 | (Belgium) Club Brugge | 3–1 | 4–0 |

==== Group stage ====
===== Group B =====
| Pos | Team | Pld | W | D | L | GF | GA | GD | Pts | Qualification | WOL | PSV | MUN | CSKA |
|---|---|---|---|---|---|---|---|---|---|---|---|---|---|---|
| 1 | (Germany) VfL Wolfsburg | 6 | 4 | 0 | 2 | 9 | 6 | +3 | 12 | Advance to knockout phase | — | 2–0 | 3–2 | 1–0 |
| 2 | (Netherlands) PSV Eindhoven | 6 | 3 | 1 | 2 | 8 | 7 | +1 | 10 | Advance to knockout phase | 2–0 | — | 2–1 | 2–1 |
| 3 | (England) Manchester United | 6 | 2 | 2 | 2 | 7 | 7 | 0 | 8 | Transfer to Europa League | 2–1 | 0–0 | — | 1–0 |
| 4 | (Russia) CSKA Moscow | 6 | 1 | 1 | 4 | 5 | 9 | −4 | 4 | | 0–2 | 3–2 | 1–1 | — |

Source: UEFA

===== Group D =====
| Pos | Team | Pld | W | D | L | GF | GA | GD | Pts | Qualification | MCI | JUV | SEV | BMG |
|---|---|---|---|---|---|---|---|---|---|---|---|---|---|---|
| 1 | (England) Manchester City | 6 | 4 | 0 | 2 | 12 | 8 | +4 | 12 | Advance to knockout phase | — | 1–2 | 2–1 | 4–2 |
| 2 | (Italy) Juventus | 6 | 3 | 2 | 1 | 6 | 3 | +3 | 11 | Advance to knockout phase | 1–0 | — | 2–0 | 0–0 |
| 3 | (Spain) Sevilla | 6 | 2 | 0 | 4 | 8 | 11 | −3 | 6 | Transfer to Europa League | 1–3 | 1–0 | — | 3–0 |
| 4 | (Germany) Borussia Mönchengladbach | 6 | 1 | 2 | 3 | 8 | 12 | −4 | 5 | | 1–2 | 1–1 | 4–2 | — |

Source: UEFA

===== Group F =====
| Pos | Team | Pld | W | D | L | GF | GA | GD | Pts | Qualification | BAY | ARS | OLY | DZG |
|---|---|---|---|---|---|---|---|---|---|---|---|---|---|---|
| 1 | (Germany) Bayern Munich | 6 | 5 | 0 | 1 | 19 | 3 | +16 | 15 | Advance to knockout phase | — | 5–1 | 4–0 | 5–0 |
| 2 | (England) Arsenal | 6 | 3 | 0 | 3 | 12 | 10 | +2 | 9 | Advance to knockout phase | 2–0 | — | 2–3 | 3–0 |
| 3 | (Greece) Olympiacos | 6 | 3 | 0 | 3 | 6 | 13 | −7 | 9 | Transfer to Europa League | 0–3 | 0–3 | — | 2–1 |
| 4 | (Croatia) Dinamo Zagreb | 6 | 1 | 0 | 5 | 3 | 14 | −11 | 3 | | 0–2 | 2–1 | 0–1 | — |

Source: UEFA

===== Group G =====
| Pos | Team | Pld | W | D | L | GF | GA | GD | Pts | Qualification | CHE | DKV | POR | MTA |
|---|---|---|---|---|---|---|---|---|---|---|---|---|---|---|
| 1 | (England) Chelsea | 6 | 4 | 1 | 1 | 13 | 3 | +10 | 13 | Advance to knockout phase | — | 2–1 | 2–0 | 4–0 |
| 2 | (Ukraine) Dynamo Kyiv | 6 | 3 | 2 | 1 | 8 | 4 | +4 | 11 | Advance to knockout phase | 0–0 | — | 2–2 | 1–0 |
| 3 | (Portugal) Porto | 6 | 3 | 1 | 2 | 9 | 8 | +1 | 10 | Transfer to Europa League | 2–1 | 0–2 | — | 2–0 |
| 4 | (Israel) Maccabi Tel Aviv | 6 | 0 | 0 | 6 | 1 | 16 | −15 | 0 | | 0–4 | 0–2 | 1–3 | — |

Source: UEFA

==== Knockout phase ====
===== Round of 16 =====
The draw for the round of 16 was held on 14 December 2015. The first legs were played on 16, 17, 23 and 24 February, and the second legs were played on 8, 9, 15 and 16 March 2016.

| Team 1 | Agg. | Team 2 | 1st leg | 2nd leg |
|---|---|---|---|---|
| Gent (Belgium) | 2–4 | (Germany) VfL Wolfsburg | 2–3 | 0–1 |
| Roma (Italy) | 0–4 | (Spain) Real Madrid | 0–2 | 0–2 |
| Paris Saint-Germain (France) | 4–2 | (England) Chelsea | 2–1 | 2–1 |
| Arsenal (England) | 1–5 | (Spain) Barcelona | 0–2 | 1–3 |
| Juventus (Italy) | 4–6 | (Germany) Bayern Munich | 2–2 | 2–4 (a.e.t.) |
| PSV Eindhoven (Netherlands) | 0–0 (7–8 p) | (Spain) Atlético Madrid | 0–0 | 0–0 (a.e.t.) |
| Benfica (Portugal) | 3–1 | (Russia) Zenit Saint Petersburg | 1–0 | 2–1 |
| Dynamo Kyiv (Ukraine) | 1–3 | (England) Manchester City | 1–3 | 0–0 |

===== Quarter-finals =====
The draw for the quarter-finals was held on 18 March 2016. The first legs were played on 5 and 6 April, and the second legs were played on 12 and 13 April 2016.

| Team 1 | Agg. | Team 2 | 1st leg | 2nd leg |
|---|---|---|---|---|
| VfL Wolfsburg (Germany) | 2–3 | (Spain) Real Madrid | 2–0 | 0–3 |
| Bayern Munich (Germany) | 3–2 | (Portugal) Benfica | 1–0 | 2–2 |
| Barcelona (Spain) | 2–3 | (Spain) Atlético Madrid | 2–1 | 0–2 |
| Paris Saint-Germain (France) | 2–3 | (England) Manchester City | 2–2 | 0–1 |

===== Semi-finals =====
The draw for the semi-finals was held on 15 April 2016. The first legs were played on 26 and 27 April, and the second legs were played on 3 and 4 May 2016.

| Team 1 | Agg. | Team 2 | 1st leg | 2nd leg |
|---|---|---|---|---|
| Manchester City (England) | 0–1 | (Spain) Real Madrid | 0–0 | 0–1 |
| Atlético Madrid (Spain) | 2–2 (a) | (Germany) Bayern Munich | 1–0 | 1–2 |

=== 2015–16 UEFA Europa League ===
==== Qualifying rounds ====
===== First qualifying round =====
| Team 1 | Agg. | Team 2 | 1st leg | 2nd leg |
|---|---|---|---|---|
| West Ham United (England) | 4–0 | (Andorra) Lusitanos | 3–0 | 1–0 |

===== Second qualifying round =====
| Team 1 | Agg. | Team 2 | 1st leg | 2nd leg |
|---|---|---|---|---|
| West Ham United (England) | 1–1 (5–3 p) | (Malta) Birkirkara | 1–0 | 0–1 (a.e.t.) |

===== Third qualifying round =====
| Team 1 | Agg. | Team 2 | 1st leg | 2nd leg |
|---|---|---|---|---|
| West Ham United (England) | 3–4 | (Romania) Astra Giurgiu | 2–2 | 1–2 |
| Southampton (England) | 5–0 | (Netherlands) Vitesse | 3–0 | 2–0 |

===== Play-off round =====
| Team 1 | Agg. | Team 2 | 1st leg | 2nd leg |
|---|---|---|---|---|
| Southampton (England) | 1–2 | (Denmark) Midtjylland | 1–1 | 0–1 |

==== Group stage ====
===== Group B =====
| Pos | Team | Pld | W | D | L | GF | GA | GD | Pts | Qualification | LIV | SIO | RUB | BOR |
|---|---|---|---|---|---|---|---|---|---|---|---|---|---|---|
| 1 | (England) Liverpool | 6 | 2 | 4 | 0 | 6 | 4 | +2 | 10 | Advance to knockout phase | — | 1–1 | 1–1 | 2–1 |
| 2 | (Switzerland) Sion | 6 | 2 | 3 | 1 | 5 | 5 | 0 | 9 | Advance to knockout phase | 0–0 | — | 2–1 | 1–1 |
| 3 | (Russia) Rubin Kazan | 6 | 1 | 3 | 2 | 6 | 6 | 0 | 6 | | 0–1 | 2–0 | — | 0–0 |
| 4 | (France) Bordeaux | 6 | 0 | 4 | 2 | 5 | 7 | −2 | 4 | | 1–1 | 0–1 | 2–2 | — |

Source: Soccerway

===== Group J =====
| Pos | Team | Pld | W | D | L | GF | GA | GD | Pts | Qualification | TOT | AND | MON | QAR |
|---|---|---|---|---|---|---|---|---|---|---|---|---|---|---|
| 1 | (England) Tottenham Hotspur | 6 | 4 | 1 | 1 | 12 | 6 | +6 | 13 | Advance to knockout phase | — | 2–1 | 4–1 | 3–1 |
| 2 | (Belgium) Anderlecht | 6 | 3 | 1 | 2 | 8 | 6 | +2 | 10 | Advance to knockout phase | 2–1 | — | 1–1 | 2–1 |
| 3 | (France) Monaco | 6 | 1 | 3 | 2 | 5 | 9 | −4 | 6 | | 1–1 | 0–2 | — | 1–0 |
| 4 | (Azerbaijan) Qarabağ | 6 | 1 | 1 | 4 | 4 | 8 | −4 | 4 | | 0–1 | 1–0 | 1–1 | — |

Source: Soccerway

==== Knockout phase ====
===== Round of 32 =====
The draw for the round of 32 was held on 14 December 2015. The first legs were played on 16 and 18 February, and the second legs were played on 24 and 25 February 2016.

| Team 1 | Agg. | Team 2 | 1st leg | 2nd leg |
|---|---|---|---|---|
| Valencia (Spain) | 10–0 | (Austria) Rapid Wien | 6–0 | 4–0 |
| Fiorentina (Italy) | 1–4 | (England) Tottenham Hotspur | 1–1 | 0–3 |
| Borussia Dortmund (Germany) | 3–0 | (Portugal) Porto | 2–0 | 1–0 |
| Fenerbahçe (Turkey) | 3–1 | (Russia) Lokomotiv Moscow | 2–0 | 1–1 |
| Anderlecht (Belgium) | 3–1 | (Greece) Olympiacos | 1–0 | 2–1 (a.e.t.) |
| Midtjylland (Denmark) | 3–6 | (England) Manchester United | 2–1 | 1–5 |
| FC Augsburg (Germany) | 0–1 | (England) Liverpool | 0–0 | 0–1 |
| Sparta Prague (Czech Republic) | 4–0 | (Russia) Krasnodar | 1–0 | 3–0 |
| Galatasaray (Turkey) | 2–4 | (Italy) Lazio | 1–1 | 1–3 |
| Sion (Switzerland) | 3–4 | (Portugal) Braga | 1–2 | 2–2 |
| Shakhtar Donetsk (Ukraine) | 3–0 | (Germany) Schalke 04 | 0–0 | 3–0 |
| Marseille (France) | 1–2 | (Spain) Athletic Bilbao | 0–1 | 1–1 |
| Sevilla (Spain) | 3–1 | (Norway) Molde | 3–0 | 0–1 |
| Sporting CP (Portugal) | 1–4 | (Germany) Bayer Leverkusen | 0–1 | 1–3 |
| Villarreal (Spain) | 2–1 | (Italy) Napoli | 1–0 | 1–1 |
| Saint-Étienne (France) | 4–4 (a) | (Switzerland) Basel | 3–2 | 1–2 |

===== Round of 16 =====
The draw for the round of 16 was held on 26 February 2016. The first legs were played on 10 March, and the second legs were played on 17 March 2016.

| Team 1 | Agg. | Team 2 | 1st leg | 2nd leg |
|---|---|---|---|---|
| Shakhtar Donetsk (Ukraine) | 4–1 | (Belgium) Anderlecht | 3–1 | 1–0 |
| Basel (Switzerland) | 0–3 | (Spain) Sevilla | 0–0 | 0–3 |
| Villarreal (Spain) | 2–0 | (Germany) Bayer Leverkusen | 2–0 | 0–0 |
| Athletic Bilbao (Spain) | 2–2 (a) | (Spain) Valencia | 1–0 | 1–2 |
| Liverpool (England) | 3–1 | (England) Manchester United | 2–0 | 1–1 |
| Sparta Prague (Czech Republic) | 4–1 | (Italy) Lazio | 1–1 | 3–0 |
| Borussia Dortmund (Germany) | 5–1 | (England) Tottenham Hotspur | 3–0 | 2–1 |
| Fenerbahçe (Turkey) | 2–4 | (Portugal) Braga | 1–0 | 1–4 |

===== Quarter-finals =====
The draw for the quarter-finals was held on 18 March 2016. The first legs were played on 7 April, and the second legs were played on 14 April 2016.

| Team 1 | Agg. | Team 2 | 1st leg | 2nd leg |
|---|---|---|---|---|
| Braga (Portugal) | 1–6 | (Ukraine) Shakhtar Donetsk | 1–2 | 0–4 |
| Villarreal (Spain) | 6–3 | (Czech Republic) Sparta Prague | 2–1 | 4–2 |
| Athletic Bilbao (Spain) | 3–3 (4–5 p) | (Spain) Sevilla | 1–2 | 2–1 (a.e.t.) |
| Borussia Dortmund (Germany) | 4–5 | (England) Liverpool | 1–1 | 3–4 |

===== Semi-finals =====
The draw for the semi-finals was held on 15 April 2016. The first legs were played on 28 April, and the second legs were played on 5 May 2016.

| Team 1 | Agg. | Team 2 | 1st leg | 2nd leg |
|---|---|---|---|---|
| Shakhtar Donetsk (Ukraine) | 3–5 | (Spain) Sevilla | 2–2 | 1–3 |
| Villarreal (Spain) | 1–3 | (England) Liverpool | 1–0 | 0–3 |

===== Final =====
The final was played on 18 May 2016 at the St. Jakob-Park in Basel, Switzerland. The "home" team (for administrative purposes) was determined by an additional draw held after the semi-final draw.

18 May 2016
20:45 UTC+2

| Liverpool (England) | 1–3 | (Spain) Sevilla |
|---|---|---|
| Sturridge 35' | Report | Gameiro 46'; Coke 64', 70' |

St. Jakob-Park, Basel
Attendance: 34,429
Referee: Jonas Eriksson (Sweden)

== League season ==
=== Premier League ===
The most unexpected title race in Premier League history saw Leicester City defy all of their critics and win their first ever top-flight title in their 132-year history. Despite being tipped for relegation following the pre-season sacking of Nigel Pearson and replacing him with Claudio Ranieri, the Foxes remained in contention all season long and never once fell outside of the top seven, taking top spot in early January and never relinquishing it. This stunning achievement, coupled with a solid defence and the free-scoring efforts of Jamie Vardy (who broke the record for scoring in 11 consecutive Premier League games) and Riyad Mahrez, saw the club receive mass acclaim at home and abroad for their efforts. Leicester's triumph would mark the first first-time champion of English football since Nottingham Forest's first title win during the 1977–78 season, as well as the first time this happened in the Premier League era.

Growing fan protests towards manager Arsène Wenger saw Arsenal endure another trophyless season after a collapse in form, but they recovered well to secure their first second-placed finish in 11 years, while goalkeeper Petr Čech won the Golden Glove for having the most clean sheets. Tottenham Hotspur finished an unlikely third, their first since 1990 – despite a very slow start, a six-match winning run in early January saw them become Leicester's closest title challengers, until multiple slip-ups in their remaining games ruined their chances of finishing above North London rivals Arsenal and saw them miss out on the top two. Nevertheless, it was still a fantastic achievement for the club, who qualified for the Champions League for only the third time, whilst Harry Kane was the league's highest scorer with 25 goals.

Manchester City endured a disappointing league season, only just securing a Champions League spot, but made up for it in Manuel Pellegrini's last season in charge by winning the Football League Cup, as well as reaching the semi-finals of the Champions League for the first time, only narrowly losing to Real Madrid. Manchester United also suffered a similarly underwhelming season; like City they had looked like potential title challengers early on, before a dreadful run of form in the winter derailed any such hopes and led to growing anger from the fans towards manager Louis van Gaal's defensive style of play. While the emergence of promising young striker Marcus Rashford helped revitalise their season somewhat and they won the FA Cup for the first time since 2004, they ultimately missed out on a Champions League spot on goal difference, and as a result, at the end of the season, van Gaal was sacked.

Having finished seventh the previous year, Southampton went one further and finished in sixth place, successfully ensuring qualification for the Europa League group stages. Whilst they had spent the first half of the season surprisingly hovering above the relegation zone, the return of goalkeeper Fraser Forster from injury saw a massive change in fortunes. In their last ever season at Upton Park before moving to the Olympic Stadium, West Ham United enjoyed arguably their greatest league campaign since their highest-ever finish thirty years prior and qualified for the Europa League. Although too many draws prevented them from securing a Champions League spot, Slaven Bilić had a successful first campaign as manager, which included victories at Arsenal, Liverpool and Manchester City before the end of September.

A poor start to the season saw Liverpool replace Brendan Rodgers with Jürgen Klopp, which bought about a successful change in both performance and results. Though several dropped points prevented them from finishing higher than eighth, the club enjoyed a stunning Europa League run that took them to the final where they ultimately lost to Sevilla and ensured no European football for the following season. Chelsea endured a torrid campaign as they made arguably the worst title defence in modern footballing history, hovering above the relegation zone by mid-December; while the sacking of José Mourinho (just seven months after leading the club to their fourth Premier League title) for Guus Hiddink on a caretaker basis saw a massive improvement in league results, a lack of success in their other competitions saw the club finish in their lowest league position for 20 years and fail to qualify for any European competitions for the first time in 19 years.

Of the three promoted teams, Watford surprisingly performed the best, finishing in 13th place with more wins than their previous two top-flight campaigns combined. Despite suffering a steep drop in form in 2016, the Hornets were never seriously threatened with relegation and alongside reaching the FA Cup semi-finals, the club ensured a second successive top-flight campaign for the first time in nearly 30 years whilst star strike duo Odion Ighalo and Troy Deeney netted 28 goals between them. Swansea City finished 12th having made a decent start, only for it to turn into a disastrous run of form that saw them slip into the relegation places by January. But the appointment of Francesco Guidolin saw them rise up the table and thus finishing well clear of the relegation zone.

Having been in contention for their highest league finish in their history and fighting for qualification for the UEFA Champions League for the first time in their history by Christmas, a run of just two wins in 2016 saw Crystal Palace only just secure their place in the Premier League for the fourth season in a row, though a stunning run to the FA Cup Final more than made amends in Alan Pardew's first full season in charge. AFC Bournemouth's first-ever top-flight season quickly turned into a nightmare as long-term injuries to key players saw their form plummet and the chances of instant relegation increase – however, a six-match unbeaten run before Christmas which included successive wins over Chelsea and Manchester United, coupled with several bursts of good form, saw the Cherries secure their survival with several games to spare, however a poor end to a season prevented them a top half finish in their first season in the top flight.

After nearly 30 years in the top-flight and a succession of lower finishes since the departure of Martin O'Neill in 2010, Aston Villa finally ran out of luck and were relegated in bottom place in a season that saw them change managers three times – after winning away on the opening day, they proceeded to win just two more games in the season as they finished their campaign with the third lowest points total in Premier League history of 17 points, their season not being helped further by growing fan protests towards the owners as well as a failure to replace key players such as Fabian Delph and Christian Benteke in the summer. Finishing above them were Norwich City; despite being tipped to finish higher than both their promotion rivals as well as making several signings in both transfer windows, the Canaries were simply unable to re-adapt to the fast pace of the top-flight and their inability to score was once again their downfall, despite a famous victory over Manchester United at Old Trafford in December. Taking the final relegation spot were Newcastle United, whose steep decline in form since qualifying for the Europa League in 2012 finally took its toll and they endured their second relegation from the top-flight in seven years, in spite of spending nearly £100 million on new players, as well as the managerial presence of both Steve McClaren and then Rafael Benítez late in the season.

| Pos | Team | Pld | W | D | L | GF | GA | GD | Pts | Qualification or relegation |
|---|---|---|---|---|---|---|---|---|---|---|
| 1 | Leicester City (C) | 38 | 23 | 12 | 3 | 68 | 36 | +32 | 81 | Qualification for the Champions League group stage |
| 2 | Arsenal | 38 | 20 | 11 | 7 | 65 | 36 | +29 | 71 | Qualification for the Champions League group stage |
| 3 | Tottenham Hotspur | 38 | 19 | 13 | 6 | 69 | 35 | +34 | 70 | Qualification for the Champions League group stage |
| 4 | Manchester City | 38 | 19 | 9 | 10 | 71 | 41 | +30 | 66 | Qualification for the Champions League play-off round |
| 5 | Manchester United | 38 | 19 | 9 | 10 | 49 | 35 | +14 | 66 | Qualification for the Europa League group stage (Note: Manchester United qualified for the Europa League group stage by winning the 2015–16 FA Cup. As they had also qualified by their virtue of their league position (5th), this spot was passed to the next-highest ranked team (6th), Southampton.) |
| 6 | Southampton | 38 | 18 | 9 | 11 | 59 | 41 | +18 | 63 | Qualification for the Europa League group stage |
| 7 | West Ham United | 38 | 16 | 14 | 8 | 65 | 51 | +14 | 62 | Qualification for the Europa League third qualifying round (Note: Manchester City qualified for the Europa League third qualifying round by winning the 2015–16 Football League Cup. However, since they already qualified for European competition based on their league position, the spot awarded to the League Cup winners was passed to the next best-placed team (seventh-placed West Ham United).) |
| 8 | Liverpool | 38 | 16 | 12 | 10 | 63 | 50 | +13 | 60 | |
| 9 | Stoke City | 38 | 14 | 9 | 15 | 41 | 55 | −14 | 51 | |
| 10 | Chelsea | 38 | 12 | 14 | 12 | 59 | 53 | +6 | 50 | |
| 11 | Everton | 38 | 11 | 14 | 13 | 59 | 55 | +4 | 47 | |
| 12 | Swansea City | 38 | 12 | 11 | 15 | 42 | 52 | −10 | 47 | |
| 13 | Watford | 38 | 12 | 9 | 17 | 40 | 50 | −10 | 45 | |
| 14 | West Bromwich Albion | 38 | 10 | 13 | 15 | 34 | 48 | −14 | 43 | |
| 15 | Crystal Palace | 38 | 11 | 9 | 18 | 39 | 51 | −12 | 42 | |
| 16 | Bournemouth | 38 | 11 | 9 | 18 | 45 | 67 | −22 | 42 | |
| 17 | Sunderland | 38 | 9 | 12 | 17 | 48 | 62 | −14 | 39 | |
| 18 | Newcastle United (R) | 38 | 9 | 10 | 19 | 44 | 65 | −21 | 37 | Relegation to EFL Championship |
| 19 | Norwich City (R) | 38 | 9 | 7 | 22 | 39 | 67 | −28 | 34 | Relegation to EFL Championship |
| 20 | Aston Villa (R) | 38 | 3 | 8 | 27 | 27 | 76 | −49 | 17 | Relegation to EFL Championship |

Source: Barclays Premier League
Rules for classification: 1) Points; 2) Goal difference; 3) Goals scored; 4) Play-offs (only if needed to decide champion, teams for relegation or teams for UEFA competitions).
(C) Champions; (R) Relegated

=== Football League Championship ===
In one of the tightest second-tier title races in history, Burnley ultimately edged out the opposition to win the title and secure an immediate return to the Premier League, their first top-flight bounce-back since the end of the 19th century. Having been adrift of the automatic promotion places at Christmas, the Clarets finished the season unbeaten in 23 games and record signing Andre Gray was their top scorer with 25 goals. Despite a nervy end to their season, Middlesbrough ultimately shook off their disappointing play-off final loss the previous season and returned to the Premier League after a seven-year absence, recording the best defense for the second year running and conceding just eight goals at home. Taking the final place through the play-offs were Hull City, who scraped past Sheffield Wednesday in the final and secured their own instant return to the top-flight, earning Steve Bruce his fourth promotion as a manager.

Brighton Hove & Albion enjoyed arguably their most successful season for many years, as they enjoyed their own unbeaten run of 21 games in the first half of the season and lost just five times overall, only just missing out on automatic promotion on goal difference and then losing in the playoffs. Having been well in the mix for promotion the previous season, Ipswich Town struggled to mount a real promotion charge and finished just five points off of the playoffs. Despite suffering from low home attendances, Cardiff City mounted a surprise promotion challenge, staying well in the fight until defeat in their penultimate game ended their hopes – manager Russell Slade was then promoted to head of football at the season's end.

At the bottom of the table, Bolton Wanderers were relegated in last place after a miserable season that saw them threatened with going out of business and failing to win one away game all season, falling into the third tier for the first time since 1993. Finishing above them were Milton Keynes Dons, who were unable to adapt to the fast pace of the second tier like both Preston North End (who made a surprise push for the playoffs after having been tipped to struggle) and Bristol City (who flirted with relegation throughout the season before a late surge pushed them up the table), and in stark contrast to their free-scoring promotion season a year prior, were ultimately undone by their complete inability to score. Filling the final relegation place were Charlton Athletic, whose bright start rapidly fell away and many of their results resulting in heavy losses – as with Aston Villa, their season was not helped by several fan protests against the club's owners and their policies on managerial and player signings.

| Pos | Team | Pld | W | D | L | GF | GA | GD | Pts | Promotion, qualification or relegation |
|---|---|---|---|---|---|---|---|---|---|---|
| 1 | Burnley (C, P) | 46 | 26 | 15 | 5 | 72 | 35 | +37 | 93 | Promotion to the Premier League |
| 2 | Middlesbrough (P) | 46 | 26 | 11 | 9 | 63 | 31 | +32 | 89 | Promotion to the Premier League |
| 3 | Brighton & Hove Albion | 46 | 24 | 17 | 5 | 72 | 42 | +30 | 89 | Qualification for the Championship play-offs (Note: Four teams play for one spot and promotion to the Premier League.) |
| 4 | Hull City (O, P) | 46 | 24 | 11 | 11 | 69 | 35 | +34 | 83 | Qualification for the Championship play-offs |
| 5 | Derby County | 46 | 21 | 15 | 10 | 66 | 43 | +23 | 78 | Qualification for the Championship play-offs |
| 6 | Sheffield Wednesday | 46 | 19 | 17 | 10 | 66 | 45 | +21 | 74 | Qualification for the Championship play-offs |
| 7 | Ipswich Town | 46 | 18 | 15 | 13 | 53 | 51 | +2 | 69 | |
| 8 | Cardiff City | 46 | 17 | 17 | 12 | 56 | 51 | +5 | 68 | |
| 9 | Brentford | 46 | 19 | 8 | 19 | 72 | 67 | +5 | 65 | |
| 10 | Birmingham City | 46 | 16 | 15 | 15 | 53 | 49 | +4 | 63 | |
| 11 | Preston North End | 46 | 15 | 17 | 14 | 45 | 45 | 0 | 62 | |
| 12 | Queens Park Rangers | 46 | 14 | 18 | 14 | 54 | 54 | 0 | 60 | |
| 13 | Leeds United | 46 | 14 | 17 | 15 | 50 | 58 | −8 | 59 | |
| 14 | Wolverhampton Wanderers | 46 | 14 | 16 | 16 | 53 | 58 | −5 | 58 | |
| 15 | Blackburn Rovers | 46 | 13 | 16 | 17 | 46 | 46 | 0 | 55 | |
| 16 | Nottingham Forest | 46 | 13 | 16 | 17 | 43 | 47 | −4 | 55 | |
| 17 | Reading | 46 | 13 | 13 | 20 | 52 | 59 | −7 | 52 | |
| 18 | Bristol City | 46 | 13 | 13 | 20 | 54 | 71 | −17 | 52 | |
| 19 | Huddersfield Town | 46 | 13 | 12 | 21 | 59 | 70 | −11 | 51 | |
| 20 | Fulham | 46 | 12 | 15 | 19 | 66 | 79 | −13 | 51 | |
| 21 | Rotherham United | 46 | 13 | 10 | 23 | 53 | 71 | −18 | 49 | |
| 22 | Charlton Athletic (R) | 46 | 9 | 13 | 24 | 40 | 80 | −40 | 40 | Relegation to EFL League One |
| 23 | Milton Keynes Dons (R) | 46 | 9 | 12 | 25 | 39 | 69 | −30 | 39 | Relegation to EFL League One |
| 24 | Bolton Wanderers (R) | 46 | 5 | 15 | 26 | 41 | 81 | −40 | 30 | Relegation to EFL League One |

Source: BBC Sport
Rules for classification: 1) Points; 2) Goal difference; 3) Number of goals scored
(C) Champions; (O) Play-off winners; (P) Promoted; (R) Relegated

=== Football League One ===
In their first season at this level for 12 years, Wigan Athletic ensured their drop in form was only temporary as they secured an immediate promotion back to the Championship, in no small part due a twenty-match unbeaten run mid-season. Burton Albion's first-ever season in the third tier resulted in a second successive promotion; for the second season in a row they lost their manager while heading the table, when Jimmy Floyd Hasselbaink moved to Queens Park Rangers, but the club's re-hiring of Nigel Clough for a second spell as manager kept their promotion challenge on-track, though several bursts of indifferent form (and a somewhat poor goal-scoring record) ensured that their promotion went to the last day. With this feat, Albion also brought second-tier League football back to their town since the dismissal of their predecessor club Burton United in 1907. Taking the final spot through the play-offs and returning to the Championship after two years were Barnsley – despite being bottom of League One in November and then losing their manager to Bristol City in January, in addition to only just scraping into the play-offs in the last few games, the Tykes ultimately enjoyed a successful season which also included winning the Football League Trophy, their first major trophy in over a hundred years.

After achieving survival in the previous two seasons, Crewe Alexandra ran out of luck at last, and they were relegated back to League Two after four years at this level, after a season in which they were never outside the bottom two after their fifth league game and won just seven times – their season was not helped by growing anger from the fans towards the owners for their continual refusal to sack manager Steve Davis. Colchester United fared little better as their awful defensive record, which saw them very nearly concede 100 goals in the league, helped doom them to the fourth tier for the first time since 1998. Blackpool suffered their second successive relegation and their third relegation in six years, falling into the fourth tier for the first time since 2001 amid ever-increasing supporter unrest at the Oyston family's ownership of the club and their continual refusal to sell. Doncaster Rovers occupied the final relegation spot; after poor early-season results, the appointment of Darren Ferguson as manager seemed to have revived their fortunes, but a terrible run of form after the turn of the year helped condemn them to relegation, with even a win against Wigan counting for nothing.

| Pos | Team | Pld | W | D | L | GF | GA | GD | Pts | Promotion, qualification or relegation |
|---|---|---|---|---|---|---|---|---|---|---|
| 1 | Wigan Athletic (C, P) | 46 | 24 | 15 | 7 | 82 | 45 | +37 | 87 | Promotion to EFL Championship |
| 2 | Burton Albion (P) | 46 | 25 | 10 | 11 | 57 | 37 | +20 | 85 | Promotion to EFL Championship |
| 3 | Walsall | 46 | 24 | 12 | 10 | 71 | 49 | +22 | 84 | Qualification for the League One play-offs (Note: Four teams play for one spot and promotion to Football League Championship.) |
| 4 | Millwall | 46 | 24 | 9 | 13 | 73 | 49 | +24 | 81 | Qualification for the League One play-offs |
| 5 | Bradford City | 46 | 23 | 11 | 12 | 55 | 40 | +15 | 80 | Qualification for the League One play-offs |
| 6 | Barnsley (O, P) | 46 | 22 | 8 | 16 | 70 | 54 | +16 | 74 | Qualification for the League One play-offs |
| 7 | Scunthorpe United | 46 | 21 | 11 | 14 | 60 | 47 | +13 | 74 | |
| 8 | Coventry City | 46 | 19 | 12 | 15 | 67 | 49 | +18 | 69 | |
| 9 | Gillingham | 46 | 19 | 12 | 15 | 71 | 56 | +15 | 69 | |
| 10 | Rochdale | 46 | 19 | 12 | 15 | 68 | 61 | +7 | 69 | |
| 11 | Sheffield United | 46 | 18 | 12 | 16 | 64 | 59 | +5 | 66 | |
| 12 | Port Vale | 46 | 18 | 11 | 17 | 56 | 58 | −2 | 65 | |
| 13 | Peterborough United | 46 | 19 | 6 | 21 | 82 | 73 | +9 | 63 | |
| 14 | Southend United | 46 | 16 | 11 | 19 | 58 | 64 | −6 | 59 | |
| 15 | Swindon Town | 46 | 16 | 11 | 19 | 64 | 71 | −7 | 59 | |
| 16 | Bury | 46 | 16 | 12 | 18 | 56 | 73 | −17 | 57 (Note: Bury were deducted 3 points for playing the unregistered Callum Styles against Southend United on 8 May.) | |
| 17 | Oldham Athletic | 46 | 12 | 18 | 16 | 44 | 58 | −14 | 54 | |
| 18 | Chesterfield | 46 | 15 | 8 | 23 | 58 | 70 | −12 | 53 | |
| 19 | Fleetwood Town | 46 | 12 | 15 | 19 | 52 | 56 | −4 | 51 | |
| 20 | Shrewsbury Town | 46 | 13 | 11 | 22 | 58 | 79 | −21 | 50 | |
| 21 | Doncaster Rovers (R) | 46 | 11 | 13 | 22 | 48 | 64 | −16 | 46 | Relegation to EFL League Two |
| 22 | Blackpool (R) | 46 | 12 | 10 | 24 | 40 | 63 | −23 | 46 | Relegation to EFL League Two |
| 23 | Colchester United (R) | 46 | 9 | 13 | 24 | 57 | 99 | −42 | 40 | Relegation to EFL League Two |
| 24 | Crewe Alexandra (R) | 46 | 7 | 13 | 26 | 46 | 83 | −37 | 34 | Relegation to EFL League Two |

Updated to match(es) played on 1 July 2016. Source: BBC Sport
Rules for classification: 1) Points; 2) Goal difference; 3) Number of goals scored
(C) Champions; (O) Play-off winners; (P) Promoted; (R) Relegated

=== Football League Two ===
Despite facing an uncertain future off-pitch towards the end of 2015, Northampton Town were promoted as champions, refusing to let the issues off-pitch affect their style of play and enjoying an impressive unbeaten run throughout 2016 – perhaps their only disappointment was suffering several draws in their last 10 games which just prevented them breaking the 100 point mark. Oxford United filled the second automatic spot in a successful season where they reached the final of the Football League Trophy competition, in which they narrowly lost to Barnsley and made the fourth round of the FA Cup. Finishing in third place on goal difference were Bristol Rovers, securing promotion in their first season back in the Football League and being in the promotion chase for virtually the whole season. Taking the final spot through the playoffs were AFC Wimbledon, who won promotion to the third tier for the first time in their 14-year history – coupled with the relegation of Milton Keynes Dons from the Championship, the two sides both claiming to be continuing the original Wimbledon club would be facing off in the same league for the first time from next season.

Portsmouth enjoyed their first successful season since winning the FA Cup in 2008, as they mounted a real promotion charge and were among the highest scorers in the league – their only real disappointment was suffering too many draws over the season which pushed them into the playoffs, where they narrowly lost to Plymouth. Yeovil Town almost suffered a third relegation in a row, but a good run of form following the appointment of former player Darren Way saw the club rocket up the table and survive comfortably in mid-table. Teddy Sheringham's first managerial role ended in disaster as he very nearly led Stevenage to relegation – it was only after his sacking that the club surged back up the table and secured their place in the Football League.

At the bottom of the table, York City's 4-year spell in the Football League was ended in a dreadful season where their defensive record was only marginally better than that of Morecambe and where they never once looked like staying up. Finishing just above them were Dagenham & Redbridge, whose run in the Football League came to an end despite a good late run of form.

| Pos | Team | Pld | W | D | L | GF | GA | GD | Pts | Promotion, qualification or relegation |
|---|---|---|---|---|---|---|---|---|---|---|
| 1 | Northampton Town (C, P) | 46 | 29 | 12 | 5 | 82 | 46 | +36 | 99 | Promotion to EFL League One |
| 2 | Oxford United (P) | 46 | 24 | 14 | 8 | 84 | 41 | +43 | 86 | Promotion to EFL League One |
| 3 | Bristol Rovers (P) | 46 | 26 | 7 | 13 | 77 | 46 | +31 | 85 | Promotion to EFL League One |
| 4 | Accrington Stanley | 46 | 24 | 13 | 9 | 74 | 48 | +26 | 85 | Qualification for League Two play-offs (Note: Four teams play for one spot and promotion to Football League One.) |
| 5 | Plymouth Argyle | 46 | 24 | 9 | 13 | 72 | 46 | +26 | 81 | Qualification for League Two play-offs |
| 6 | Portsmouth | 46 | 21 | 15 | 10 | 75 | 44 | +31 | 78 | Qualification for League Two play-offs |
| 7 | AFC Wimbledon (O, P) | 46 | 21 | 12 | 13 | 64 | 50 | +14 | 75 | Qualification for League Two play-offs |
| 8 | Leyton Orient | 46 | 19 | 12 | 15 | 60 | 61 | −1 | 69 | |
| 9 | Cambridge United | 46 | 18 | 14 | 14 | 66 | 55 | +11 | 68 | |
| 10 | Carlisle United | 46 | 17 | 16 | 13 | 67 | 62 | +5 | 67 | |
| 11 | Luton Town | 46 | 19 | 9 | 18 | 63 | 61 | +2 | 66 | |
| 12 | Mansfield Town | 46 | 17 | 13 | 16 | 61 | 53 | +8 | 64 | |
| 13 | Wycombe Wanderers | 46 | 17 | 13 | 16 | 45 | 44 | +1 | 64 | |
| 14 | Exeter City | 46 | 17 | 13 | 16 | 63 | 65 | −2 | 64 | |
| 15 | Barnet | 46 | 17 | 11 | 18 | 67 | 68 | −1 | 62 | |
| 16 | Hartlepool United | 46 | 15 | 6 | 25 | 49 | 72 | −23 | 51 | |
| 17 | Notts County | 46 | 14 | 9 | 23 | 54 | 83 | −29 | 51 | |
| 18 | Stevenage | 46 | 11 | 15 | 20 | 52 | 67 | −15 | 48 | |
| 19 | Yeovil Town | 46 | 11 | 15 | 20 | 43 | 59 | −16 | 48 | |
| 20 | Crawley Town | 46 | 13 | 8 | 25 | 45 | 78 | −33 | 47 | |
| 21 | Morecambe | 46 | 12 | 10 | 24 | 69 | 91 | −22 | 46 | |
| 22 | Newport County | 46 | 10 | 13 | 23 | 43 | 64 | −21 | 43 | |
| 23 | Dagenham & Redbridge (R) | 46 | 8 | 10 | 28 | 46 | 81 | −35 | 34 | Relegation to the National League |
| 24 | York City (R) | 46 | 7 | 13 | 26 | 51 | 87 | −36 | 34 | Relegation to the National League |

Updated to match(es) played on 7 May 2016. Source: BBC Sport
Rules for classification: 1) Points; 2) Goal difference; 3) Number of goals scored
(C) Champions; (O) Play-off winners; (P) Promoted; (R) Relegated

=== National League Top Division ===
Cheltenham Town secured an immediate return to the Football League as champions, becoming the first club to immediately bounce back as Conference/National League champions since Darlington in 1990 – throughout the season, they were rarely outside the top 2 and took advantage of the teams slipping up below them, breaking the 100 point mark in the process. Grimsby Town ultimately emerged victorious in the play-offs, ensuring a return to the Football League for the first time in six years.

Welling, who had only avoided relegation on goal difference the previous season, finished in bottom place. Kidderminster Harriers suffered from off-pitch turmoil and a financial crisis throughout the season, culminating in their relegation though they did finish the season with a six-game unbeaten run. Altrincham were relegated back to the Conference North after two seasons. FC Halifax Town occupied the final relegation spot, recovering well from terrible early-season form, but ultimately going down after other results went against them on the final day.

| Pos | Team | Pld | W | D | L | GF | GA | GD | Pts | Promotion, qualification or relegation |
|---|---|---|---|---|---|---|---|---|---|---|
| 1 | Cheltenham Town (C, P) | 46 | 30 | 11 | 5 | 87 | 30 | +57 | 101 | Promotion to EFL League Two |
| 2 | Forest Green Rovers | 46 | 26 | 11 | 9 | 69 | 42 | +27 | 89 | Qualification for the National League play-offs |
| 3 | Braintree Town | 46 | 23 | 12 | 11 | 56 | 38 | +18 | 81 | Qualification for the National League play-offs |
| 4 | Grimsby Town (O, P) | 46 | 22 | 14 | 10 | 82 | 45 | +37 | 80 | Qualification for the National League play-offs |
| 5 | Dover Athletic | 46 | 23 | 11 | 12 | 75 | 53 | +22 | 80 | Qualification for the National League play-offs |
| 6 | Tranmere Rovers | 46 | 22 | 12 | 12 | 61 | 44 | +17 | 78 | |
| 7 | Eastleigh | 46 | 21 | 12 | 13 | 64 | 53 | +11 | 75 | |
| 8 | Wrexham | 46 | 20 | 9 | 17 | 71 | 56 | +15 | 69 | |
| 9 | Gateshead | 46 | 19 | 10 | 17 | 59 | 70 | −11 | 67 | |
| 10 | Macclesfield Town | 46 | 19 | 9 | 18 | 60 | 48 | +12 | 66 | |
| 11 | Barrow | 46 | 17 | 14 | 15 | 64 | 71 | −7 | 65 | |
| 12 | Woking | 46 | 17 | 10 | 19 | 71 | 68 | +3 | 61 | |
| 13 | Lincoln City | 46 | 16 | 13 | 17 | 69 | 68 | +1 | 61 | |
| 14 | Bromley | 46 | 17 | 9 | 20 | 67 | 72 | −5 | 60 | |
| 15 | Aldershot Town | 46 | 16 | 8 | 22 | 54 | 72 | −18 | 56 | |
| 16 | Southport | 46 | 14 | 13 | 19 | 52 | 65 | −13 | 55 | |
| 17 | Chester | 46 | 14 | 12 | 20 | 67 | 71 | −4 | 54 | |
| 18 | Torquay United | 46 | 13 | 12 | 21 | 54 | 76 | −22 | 51 | |
| 19 | Boreham Wood | 46 | 12 | 14 | 20 | 44 | 49 | −5 | 50 | |
| 20 | Guiseley | 46 | 11 | 16 | 19 | 47 | 70 | −23 | 49 | |
| 21 | FC Halifax Town (R) | 46 | 12 | 12 | 22 | 55 | 82 | −27 | 48 | Relegation to National League North |
| 22 | Altrincham (R) | 46 | 10 | 14 | 22 | 48 | 73 | −25 | 44 | Relegation to National League North |
| 23 | Kidderminster Harriers (R) | 46 | 9 | 13 | 24 | 49 | 71 | −22 | 40 | Relegation to National League North |
| 24 | Welling United (R) | 46 | 8 | 11 | 27 | 35 | 73 | −38 | 35 | Relegation to National League South |

Rules for classification: 1) Points; 2) Goal difference; 3) Number of goals scored
(C) Champions; (O) Play-off winners; (P) Promoted; (R) Relegated

== Cup competitions ==
=== FA Cup ===
==== Final ====
21 May 2016
17:30 BST

| Crystal Palace | 1–2 (a.e.t.) | Manchester United |
|---|---|---|
| Puncheon 78' | Report | Mata 81'; Lingard 110' |

Wembley Stadium, London
Attendance: 88,619
Referee: Mark Clattenburg

=== League Cup ===
==== Final ====
28 February 2016
16:30 GMT

| Liverpool | 1–1 (a.e.t.) | Manchester City |
|---|---|---|
| Coutinho 83' | Report | Fernandinho 49' |
Penalties
| Can (penalty scored); Lucas (penalty missed); Coutinho (penalty missed); Lallana (penalty missed) | 1–3 | (penalty missed) Fernandinho; (penalty scored) Navas; (penalty scored) Agüero; (penalty scored) Touré |

Wembley Stadium, London
Attendance: 86,206
Referee: Michael Oliver

=== Community Shield ===
2 August 2015
15:00 BST

| Arsenal | 1–0 | Chelsea |
|---|---|---|
| Oxlade-Chamberlain 24' | Report |

Wembley
Attendance: 85,437
Referee: Anthony Taylor (Cheshire)

=== Football League Trophy ===
==== Final ====
3 April 2016
14:30 BST

| Barnsley | 3–2 | Oxford United |
|---|---|---|
| Dunkley 52' (o.g.); Fletcher 68'; Hammill 74' | Report | O'Dowda 29'; Hylton 76' |

Wembley Stadium, London
Attendance: 59,230
Referee: Andy Woolmer

== Women's football ==
=== Women's Super League ===
==== Women's Super League 1 ====
| Pos | Team | Pld | W | D | L | GF | GA | GD | Pts | Qualification or relegation |
|---|---|---|---|---|---|---|---|---|---|---|
| 1 | Manchester City (C) | 16 | 13 | 3 | 0 | 36 | 4 | +32 | 42 | Qualification for the Champions League knockout phase |
| 2 | Chelsea | 16 | 12 | 1 | 3 | 42 | 17 | +25 | 37 | Qualification for the Champions League knockout phase |
| 3 | Arsenal | 16 | 10 | 2 | 4 | 33 | 14 | +19 | 32 | |
| 4 | Birmingham City | 16 | 7 | 6 | 3 | 18 | 13 | +5 | 27 | |
| 5 | Liverpool | 16 | 7 | 4 | 5 | 27 | 23 | +4 | 25 | |
| 6 | Notts County | 16 | 4 | 4 | 8 | 16 | 26 | −10 | 16 | |
| 7 | Sunderland | 16 | 2 | 4 | 10 | 17 | 41 | −24 | 10 | |
| 8 | Reading | 16 | 1 | 6 | 9 | 15 | 26 | −11 | 9 | |
| 9 | Doncaster Rovers (R) | 16 | 1 | 0 | 15 | 8 | 48 | −40 | 3 | Relegation to the FA WSL 2 |

Source: FA WSL
Rules for classification: 1) Points; 2) Goal difference; 3) Number of goals scored
(C) Champions; (R) Relegated

==== Women's Super League 2 ====
| Pos | Team | Pld | W | D | L | GF | GA | GD | Pts | Promotion |
|---|---|---|---|---|---|---|---|---|---|---|
| 1 | Yeovil Town (C) | 18 | 12 | 3 | 3 | 41 | 16 | +25 | 39 | Promotion to FA WSL 1 |
| 2 | Bristol City | 18 | 12 | 3 | 3 | 37 | 16 | +21 | 39 | Promotion to FA WSL 1 |
| 3 | Everton | 18 | 10 | 4 | 4 | 35 | 18 | +17 | 34 | |
| 4 | Durham | 18 | 10 | 3 | 5 | 30 | 19 | +11 | 33 | |
| 5 | Sheffield | 18 | 7 | 5 | 6 | 25 | 18 | +7 | 26 | |
| 6 | Aston Villa | 18 | 7 | 3 | 8 | 26 | 27 | −1 | 24 | |
| 7 | London Bees | 18 | 6 | 4 | 8 | 28 | 39 | −11 | 22 | |
| 8 | Millwall Lionesses | 18 | 3 | 7 | 8 | 24 | 31 | −7 | 16 | |
| 9 | Oxford United | 18 | 4 | 1 | 13 | 20 | 42 | −22 | 13 | |
| 10 | Watford | 18 | 2 | 1 | 15 | 13 | 53 | −40 | 7 | |

Source: FA WSL
Rules for classification: 1) Points; 2) Goal difference; 3) Number of goals scored
(C) Champions

=== Women's Premier League ===
==== Northern Division ====
| Pos | Team | Pld | W | D | L | GF | GA | GD | Pts | Promotion or relegation |
|---|---|---|---|---|---|---|---|---|---|---|
| 1 | Sporting Club Albion (C) | 22 | 17 | 2 | 3 | 55 | 22 | +33 | 53 | Qualification for the Championship play-off |
| 2 | Preston North End | 22 | 15 | 4 | 3 | 71 | 20 | +51 | 49 | |
| 3 | Blackburn Rovers | 22 | 14 | 4 | 4 | 39 | 20 | +19 | 46 | |
| 4 | Stoke City | 22 | 14 | 2 | 6 | 59 | 28 | +31 | 44 | |
| 5 | Bradford City | 22 | 12 | 2 | 8 | 48 | 31 | +17 | 38 | |
| 6 | Nottingham Forest | 22 | 11 | 4 | 7 | 37 | 27 | +10 | 37 | |
| 7 | Derby County | 22 | 9 | 1 | 12 | 37 | 47 | −10 | 28 | |
| 8 | Huddersfield Town | 22 | 7 | 4 | 11 | 47 | 56 | −9 | 25 | |
| 9 | Newcastle United | 22 | 7 | 1 | 14 | 33 | 57 | −24 | 22 | |
| 10 | Nuneaton Town | 22 | 4 | 2 | 16 | 26 | 67 | −41 | 14 | |
| 11 | Guiseley Vixens (R) | 22 | 3 | 4 | 15 | 26 | 71 | −45 | 13 | Relegation to the Division One North |
| 12 | Loughborough Foxes (R) | 22 | 3 | 2 | 17 | 26 | 58 | −32 | 11 | Relegation to the Division One Midlands |

Source: The Football Association
Rules for classification: 1) Points; 2) Goal difference; 3) Number of goals scored
(C) Champions; (R) Relegated

==== Southern Division ====
| Pos | Team | Pld | W | D | L | GF | GA | GD | Pts | Promotion, qualification or relegation |
|---|---|---|---|---|---|---|---|---|---|---|
| 1 | Brighton & Hove Albion (C, O, P) | 22 | 17 | 3 | 2 | 58 | 18 | +40 | 54 | Qualification for the Championship play-off |
| 2 | Charlton Athletic | 22 | 16 | 4 | 2 | 68 | 20 | +48 | 52 | |
| 3 | Cardiff City | 22 | 15 | 2 | 5 | 66 | 27 | +39 | 47 | |
| 4 | Coventry United | 22 | 13 | 5 | 4 | 64 | 18 | +46 | 44 | |
| 5 | Portsmouth | 22 | 14 | 2 | 6 | 61 | 27 | +34 | 44 | |
| 6 | Tottenham Hotspur | 22 | 11 | 1 | 10 | 34 | 30 | +4 | 34 | |
| 7 | Lewes | 22 | 8 | 1 | 13 | 30 | 42 | −12 | 25 | |
| 8 | C & K Basildon | 22 | 7 | 4 | 11 | 38 | 55 | −17 | 25 | |
| 9 | Queens Park Rangers | 22 | 6 | 3 | 13 | 25 | 45 | −20 | 21 | |
| 10 | West Ham United | 22 | 5 | 4 | 13 | 21 | 60 | −39 | 19 | |
| 11 | Forest Green Rovers | 22 | 2 | 2 | 18 | 19 | 76 | −57 | 8 | |
| 12 | Plymouth Argyle (R) | 22 | 1 | 3 | 18 | 23 | 89 | −66 | 6 | Relegation to Division One South West |

Source: The Football Association
Rules for classification: 1) Points; 2) Goal difference; 3) Number of goals scored
(C) Champions; (O) Play-off winners; (P) Promoted; (R) Relegated

==== Northern Division One ====
| Pos | Team | Pld | W | D | L | GF | GA | GD | Pts | Promotion or relegation |
|---|---|---|---|---|---|---|---|---|---|---|
| 1 | Middlesbrough (C, P) | 22 | 17 | 3 | 2 | 90 | 22 | +68 | 54 | Promotion to the Northern Division |
| 2 | Liverpool Marshall Feds | 22 | 15 | 1 | 6 | 79 | 39 | +40 | 46 | |
| 3 | Chorley | 22 | 13 | 3 | 6 | 60 | 46 | +14 | 42 | |
| 4 | Hull City | 22 | 10 | 7 | 5 | 47 | 39 | +8 | 37 | |
| 5 | Leeds | 22 | 11 | 2 | 9 | 35 | 41 | −6 | 35 | |
| 6 | Mossley Hill | 22 | 11 | 1 | 10 | 46 | 37 | +9 | 34 | |
| 7 | Morecambe | 22 | 9 | 2 | 11 | 50 | 59 | −9 | 29 | |
| 8 | Blackpool Wren Rovers | 22 | 9 | 1 | 12 | 42 | 68 | −26 | 28 | |
| 9 | Chester-le-Street | 22 | 7 | 6 | 9 | 39 | 47 | −8 | 27 | |
| 10 | Tranmere Rovers | 22 | 5 | 4 | 13 | 38 | 52 | −14 | 19 | |
| 11 | Stockport County (Note: Stockport had three points deducted) (R) | 22 | 5 | 4 | 13 | 46 | 65 | −19 | 16 | Relegation from the Premier League. |
| 12 | Norton & Stockton Ancients (R) | 22 | 2 | 2 | 18 | 20 | 77 | −57 | 8 | Relegation from the Premier League. |

Source: The Football Association
Rules for classification: 1) Points; 2) Goal difference; 3) Number of goals scored
(C) Champions; (P) Promoted; (R) Relegated

==== Midlands Division One ====
| Pos | Team | Pld | W | D | L | GF | GA | GD | Pts | Promotion or relegation |
|---|---|---|---|---|---|---|---|---|---|---|
| 1 | Leicester City (C, P) | 22 | 22 | 0 | 0 | 93 | 19 | +74 | 66 | Promotion to the Northern Division |
| 2 | Wolverhampton Wanderers | 22 | 14 | 3 | 5 | 62 | 30 | +32 | 45 | |
| 3 | Radcliffe Olympic | 22 | 11 | 5 | 6 | 52 | 29 | +23 | 38 | |
| 4 | Solihull | 22 | 11 | 2 | 9 | 43 | 47 | −4 | 35 | |
| 5 | Birmingham & West Midlands | 22 | 10 | 3 | 9 | 39 | 42 | −3 | 33 | |
| 6 | Loughborough Students | 22 | 9 | 1 | 12 | 44 | 54 | −10 | 28 | |
| 7 | Steel City Wanderers | 22 | 8 | 3 | 11 | 35 | 58 | −23 | 27 | |
| 8 | Leicester City Ladies | 22 | 7 | 5 | 10 | 46 | 55 | −9 | 26 | |
| 9 | Rotherham United | 22 | 7 | 3 | 12 | 42 | 53 | −11 | 24 | |
| 10 | Sporting Khalsa | 22 | 6 | 2 | 14 | 27 | 53 | −26 | 20 | |
| 11 | Peterborough Northern Star (R) | 22 | 5 | 4 | 13 | 37 | 44 | −7 | 19 | Relegation from the Premier League. |
| 12 | Leafield Athletic (R) | 22 | 6 | 1 | 15 | 30 | 66 | −36 | 19 | Relegation from the Premier League. |

Source: The Football Association
Rules for classification: 1) Points; 2) Goal difference; 3) Number of goals scored
(C) Champions; (P) Promoted; (R) Relegated

==== South East Division One ====
| Pos | Team | Pld | W | D | L | GF | GA | GD | Pts | Promotion or relegation |
|---|---|---|---|---|---|---|---|---|---|---|
| 1 | Crystal Palace (C, P) | 22 | 20 | 2 | 0 | 90 | 17 | +73 | 62 | Promotion to the Southern Division |
| 2 | Gillingham | 22 | 16 | 3 | 3 | 84 | 20 | +64 | 51 | |
| 3 | Milton Keynes Dons | 22 | 13 | 5 | 4 | 63 | 26 | +37 | 44 | |
| 4 | Luton Town | 22 | 12 | 4 | 6 | 45 | 32 | +13 | 40 | |
| 5 | Ipswich Town | 22 | 11 | 3 | 8 | 52 | 44 | +8 | 36 | |
| 6 | Cambridge United | 22 | 10 | 5 | 7 | 54 | 24 | +30 | 35 | |
| 7 | Enfield Town | 22 | 7 | 5 | 10 | 34 | 29 | +5 | 26 | |
| 8 | Norwich City | 22 | 8 | 2 | 12 | 43 | 53 | −10 | 26 | |
| 9 | Denham United | 22 | 6 | 5 | 11 | 26 | 35 | −9 | 23 | |
| 10 | Old Actonians | 22 | 5 | 2 | 15 | 25 | 63 | −38 | 17 | |
| 11 | Lowestoft Town | 22 | 2 | 3 | 17 | 17 | 97 | −80 | 9 | |
| 12 | Bedford (R) | 22 | 2 | 1 | 19 | 16 | 109 | −93 | 7 | Relegated from the Premier League. |

Source: The Football Association
Rules for classification: 1) Points; 2) Goal difference; 3) Number of goals scored
(C) Champions; (P) Promoted; (R) Relegated

==== South West Division One ====
| Pos | Team | Pld | W | D | L | GF | GA | GD | Pts | Promotion or relegation |
|---|---|---|---|---|---|---|---|---|---|---|
| 1 | Swindon Town (C, P) | 18 | 15 | 2 | 1 | 49 | 12 | +37 | 47 | Promotion to the Southern Division |
| 2 | Chichester City | 18 | 14 | 2 | 2 | 44 | 8 | +36 | 44 | |
| 3 | Keynsham Town | 18 | 12 | 3 | 3 | 45 | 19 | +26 | 39 | |
| 4 | Larkhall Athletic | 18 | 11 | 3 | 4 | 43 | 23 | +20 | 36 | |
| 5 | Exeter City | 18 | 8 | 1 | 9 | 36 | 37 | −1 | 25 | |
| 6 | Southampton Saints | 18 | 7 | 2 | 9 | 29 | 35 | −6 | 23 | |
| 7 | Maidenhead United | 18 | 7 | 1 | 10 | 28 | 37 | −9 | 22 | |
| 8 | Cheltenham Town | 18 | 4 | 0 | 14 | 17 | 49 | −32 | 12 | |
| 9 | Shanklin | 18 | 3 | 0 | 15 | 16 | 54 | −38 | 9 | |
| 10 | St Nicholas | 18 | 2 | 0 | 16 | 19 | 52 | −33 | 6 | |
| 11 | Gloucester City (X) | 0 | 0 | 0 | 0 | 0 | 0 | 0 | 0 | Resigned from league. Record expunged. |
| 12 | Swindon Spitfires (X) | 0 | 0 | 0 | 0 | 0 | 0 | 0 | 0 | Resigned from league. Record expunged. |

Source: The Football Association
Rules for classification: 1) Points; 2) Goal difference; 3) Number of goals scored
(C) Champions; (P) Promoted; (X) Resigned

=== Women's FA Cup ===
==== Final ====
14 May 2016
14:00 BST

| Arsenal | 1–0 | Chelsea |
|---|---|---|
| Carter 18' | Report |

Wembley Stadium, London
Attendance: 32,912
Referee: Sarah Garratt (Birmingham)

=== FA WSL Cup ===
==== Final ====
2 October 2016
16:00 BST

| Manchester City | 1–0 (a.e.t.) | Birmingham City |
|---|---|---|
| Bronze 104' | Report |

Academy Stadium, Manchester
Attendance: 4,214
Referee: Rebecca Welch

== Managerial changes ==
This is a list of changes of managers within English league football:

| Team | Outgoing manager | Manner of departure | Date of departure | Position in table | Incoming manager | Date of appointment |
|---|---|---|---|---|---|---|
| Blackpool | (England) Lee Clark | Resigned | 9 May 2015 | Pre-season | (England) Neil McDonald | 2 June 2015 |
| Chesterfield | (England) Paul Cook | Signed by Portsmouth | 12 May 2015 | Pre-season | (Wales) Dean Saunders | 13 May 2015 |
| Crawley Town | (Wales) Dean Saunders | Signed by Chesterfield | 13 May 2015 | Pre-season | (England) Mark Yates | 19 May 2015 |
| Leyton Orient | (Italy) Fabio Liverani | Mutual consent | 13 May 2015 | Pre-season | (England) Ian Hendon | 28 May 2015 |
| Brentford | (England) Mark Warburton | Contract expired | 15 May 2015 | Pre-season | (Netherlands) Marinus Dijkhuizen | 1 June 2015 |
| Leeds United | (England) Neil Redfearn | End of contract | 20 May 2015 | Pre-season | (Germany) Uwe Rösler | 20 May 2015 |
| West Ham United | (England) Sam Allardyce | End of contract | 24 May 2015 | Pre-season | (Croatia) Slaven Bilić | 9 June 2015 |
| Derby County | (England) Steve McClaren | Sacked | 25 May 2015 | Pre-season | (England) Paul Clement | 1 June 2015 |
| Watford | (Serbia) Slaviša Jokanović | End of Contract | 5 June 2015 | Pre-season | (Spain) Quique Sánchez Flores | 5 June 2015 |
| Newcastle United | (England) John Carver | Sacked | 9 June 2015 | Pre-season | (England) Steve McClaren | 10 June 2015 |
| Leicester City | (England) Nigel Pearson | Sacked | 30 June 2015 | Pre-season | (Italy) Claudio Ranieri | 13 July 2015 |
| Peterborough United | (England) Dave Robertson | Sacked | 6 September 2015 | 20th | (England) Graham Westley | 21 September 2015 |
| Doncaster Rovers | (Scotland) Paul Dickov | Sacked | 8 September 2015 | 17th | (Scotland) Darren Ferguson | 16 October 2015 |
| Oldham Athletic | (Northern Ireland) Darren Kelly | Sacked | 12 September 2015 | 19th | (England) David Dunn | 7 October 2015 |
| Brentford | (Netherlands) Marinus Dijkhuizen | Mutual consent | 28 September 2015 | 19th | (England) Lee Carsley | 28 September 2015 |
| Rotherham United | (Scotland) Steve Evans | Mutual consent | 28 September 2015 | 20th | (England) Neil Redfearn | 9 October 2015 |
| Fleetwood Town | (Scotland) Graham Alexander | Sacked | 30 September 2015 | 20th | (Scotland) Steven Pressley | 6 October 2015 |
| Newport County | (England) Terry Butcher | Sacked | 1 October 2015 | 24th | (England) John Sheridan | 2 October 2015 |
| Sunderland | (Netherlands) Dick Advocaat | Resigned | 4 October 2015 | 19th | (England) Sam Allardyce | 9 October 2015 |
| Liverpool | (Northern Ireland) Brendan Rodgers | Sacked | 4 October 2015 | 10th | (Germany) Jürgen Klopp | 8 October 2015 |
| Swindon Town | (England) Mark Cooper | Sacked | 17 October 2015 | 20th | (England) Martin Ling | 3 November 2015 |
| Leeds United | (Germany) Uwe Rösler | Sacked | 19 October 2015 | 18th | (Scotland) Steve Evans | 19 October 2015 |
| Charlton Athletic | (Israel) Guy Luzon | Sacked | 24 October 2015 | 22nd | (Belgium) Karel Fraeye | 24 October 2015 |
| Aston Villa | (England) Tim Sherwood | Sacked | 25 October 2015 | 19th | (France) Rémi Garde | 2 November 2015 |
| York City | (England) Russ Wilcox | Sacked | 26 October 2015 | 21st | (Scotland) Jackie McNamara | 4 November 2015 |
| Cambridge United | (England) Richard Money | Sacked | 2 November 2015 | 18th | (England) Shaun Derry | 12 November 2015 |
| Huddersfield Town | (England) Chris Powell | Sacked | 4 November 2015 | 18th | (United States) David Wagner | 5 November 2015 |
| Queens Park Rangers | (England) Chris Ramsey | Sacked | 4 November 2015 | 13th | (Netherlands) Jimmy Floyd Hasselbaink | 4 December 2015 |
| Fulham | (Wales) Kit Symons | Sacked | 8 November 2015 | 12th | (Serbia) Slaviša Jokanović | 27 December 2015 |
| Blackburn Rovers | (England) Gary Bowyer | Sacked | 10 November 2015 | 16th | (Scotland) Paul Lambert | 15 November 2015 |
| Colchester United | (England) Tony Humes | Mutual consent | 26 November 2015 | 19th | (England) Kevin Keen | 21 December 2015 |
| Chesterfield | (Wales) Dean Saunders | Sacked | 28 November 2015 | 16th | (Northern Ireland) Danny Wilson | 24 December 2015 |
| Brentford | (England) Lee Carsley | Resigned | 30 November 2015 | 11th | (England) Dean Smith | 30 November 2015 |
| Walsall | (England) Dean Smith | Signed by Brentford | 30 November 2015 | 4th | (Republic of Ireland) Seán O'Driscoll | 18 December 2015 |
| Yeovil Town | (Scotland) Paul Sturrock | Sacked | 1 December 2015 | 24th | (England) Darren Way | 31 December 2015 |
| Reading | (Scotland) Steve Clarke | Sacked | 4 December 2015 | 9th | (England) Brian McDermott | 17 December 2015 |
| Burton Albion | (Netherlands) Jimmy Floyd Hasselbaink | Signed by Queens Park Rangers | 4 December 2015 | 1st | (England) Nigel Clough | 7 December 2015 |
| Swansea City | (England) Garry Monk | Sacked | 9 December 2015 | 15th | (Wales) Alan Curtis | 7 January 2016 |
| Luton Town | (England) John Still | Sacked | 17 December 2015 | 17th | (Wales) Nathan Jones | 6 January 2016 |
| Chelsea | (Portugal) José Mourinho | Sacked | 17 December 2015 | 16th | (Netherlands) Guus Hiddink | 19 December 2015 |
| Dagenham & Redbridge | (England) Wayne Burnett | Sacked | 21 December 2015 | 24th | (England) John Still | 31 December 2015 |
| Swindon Town | (England) Martin Ling | Resigned | 29 December 2015 | 16th | (England) Luke Williams | 21 January 2016 |
| Notts County | (Netherlands) Ricardo Moniz | Sacked | 29 December 2015 | 15th | (Scotland) Jamie Fullarton | 10 January 2016 |
| Oldham Athletic | (England) David Dunn | Sacked | 12 January 2016 | 22nd | (England) John Sheridan | 13 January 2016 |
| Newport County | (England) John Sheridan | Signed by Oldham Athletic | 13 January 2016 | 20th | (Northern Ireland) Warren Feeney | 13 January 2016 |
| Charlton Athletic | (Belgium) Karel Fraeye | Sacked | 13 January 2016 | 23rd | (Belgium) José Riga | 14 January 2016 |
| Bristol City | (England) Steve Cotterill | Sacked | 14 January 2016 | 22nd | (England) Lee Johnson | 6 February 2016 |
| Leyton Orient | (England) Ian Hendon | Sacked | 18 January 2016 | 11th | (England) Kevin Nolan | 21 January 2016 |
| Scunthorpe United | (England) Mark Robins | Sacked | 18 January 2016 | 16th | (Scotland) Graham Alexander | 22 March 2016 |
| Swansea City | (Wales) Alan Curtis | End of caretaker spell | 18 January 2016 | 18th | (Italy) Francesco Guidolin | 18 January 2016 |
| Stevenage | (England) Teddy Sheringham | Sacked | 1 February 2016 | 19th | (England) Darren Sarll | 8 May 2016 |
| Barnsley | (England) Lee Johnson | Signed by Bristol City | 6 February 2016 | 12th | (England) Paul Heckingbottom | 15 June 2016 |
| Rotherham United | (England) Neil Redfearn | Sacked | 8 February 2016 | 22nd | (England) Neil Warnock | 12 February 2016 |
| Derby County | (England) Paul Clement | Sacked | 8 February 2016 | 5th | (England) Darren Wassall | 8 February 2016 |
| Hartlepool United | (England) Ronnie Moore | Mutual consent | 10 February 2016 | 22nd | (England) Craig Hignett | 11 February 2016 |
| Walsall | (Republic of Ireland) Sean O'Driscoll | Sacked | 6 March 2016 | 4th | (England) Jon Whitney | 7 March 2016 |
| Newcastle United | (England) Steve McClaren | Sacked | 11 March 2016 | 19th | (Spain) Rafael Benítez | 11 March 2016 |
| Nottingham Forest | (Scotland) Dougie Freedman | Sacked | 13 March 2016 | 14th | (France) Philippe Montanier | 27 June 2016 |
| Bolton Wanderers | (Northern Ireland) Neil Lennon | Mutual consent | 15 March 2016 | 24th | (England) Phil Parkinson | 10 June 2016 |
| Notts County | (Scotland) Jamie Fullarton | Sacked | 19 March 2016 | 19th | (England) Mark Cooper | 20 March 2016 |
| Aston Villa | (France) Rémi Garde | Mutual consent | 29 March 2016 | 20th | (Italy) Roberto Di Matteo | 2 June 2016 |
| Leyton Orient | (England) Kevin Nolan | Sacked | 12 April 2016 | 11th | (England) Andy Hessenthaler | 3 June 2016 |
| Peterborough United | (England) Graham Westley | Sacked | 23 April 2016 | 14th | (Northern Ireland) Grant McCann | 16 May 2016 |
| Crawley Town | (England) Mark Yates | Sacked | 25 April 2016 | 18th | (England) Dermot Drummy | 27 April 2016 |
| Colchester United | (England) Kevin Keen | Resigned | 26 April 2016 | 23rd | (England) John McGreal | 4 May 2016 |
| Charlton Athletic | (Belgium) José Riga | Resigned | 7 May 2016 | 22nd | (England) Russell Slade | 6 June 2016 |
| Notts County | (England) Mark Cooper | End of contract | 7 May 2016 | 17th | (England) John Sheridan | 29 May 2016 |
| Everton | (Spain) Roberto Martínez | Sacked | 12 May 2016 | 12th | (Netherlands) Ronald Koeman | 14 June 2016 |

== Deaths ==
- 2 June 2015: Dennis Fidler, 76, Manchester City, Port Vale, Grimsby Town, Halifax Town and Darlington winger.
- 4 June 2015: Roy Stroud, 90, West Ham United forward.
- 4 June 2015: Ray Weigh, 86, A.F.C. Bournemouth, Stockport County, Shrewsbury Town and Aldershot forward.
- 7 June 2015: Ken Barrett, 77, Aston Villa and Lincoln City winger.
- 10 June 2015: Johnny Fullam, 75, Republic of Ireland and Preston North End winger.
- 11 June 2015: Ian McKechnie, 73, Arsenal, Southend United and Hull City goalkeeper.
- 11 June 2015: Jimmy Robertson, 86, Arsenal and Brentford winger.
- 15 June 2015: Doug Anderson, 51, Oldham Athletic, Tranmere Rovers, Plymouth Argyle, Cambridge United and Northampton Town winger
- June 2015: Howard Johnson, 89, Sheffield United and York City defender.
- 18 June 2015: Brian Taylor, 78, Walsall, Shrewsbury Town, Birmingham City, Rotherham United, Port Vale and Barnsley winger.
- 25 June 2015: Gordon Fearnley, 65, Sheffield Wednesday and Bristol Rovers forward.
- 26 June 2015: Denis Thwaites, 70, Birmingham City outside left.
- 26 June 2015: Larry Carberry, 79, Ipswich Town and Barrow right back.
- 10 July 2015: Jimmy Murray, 82, Scotland and Reading forward.
- 16 July 2015: Brian Hall, 68, Liverpool, Plymouth Argyle and Burnley midfielder.
- 20 July 2015: Fred Else, 82, Preston North End, Blackburn Rovers and Barrow goalkeeper.
- 20 July 2015: Des Horne, 75, Wolverhampton Wanderers and Blackpool winger.
- 22 July 2015: Bobby Jones, 76, Bristol Rovers, Northampton Town and Swindon Town forward.
- 5 August 2015: Tony Millington, 72, West Bromwich Albion, Crystal Palace, Peterborough United, Swansea City and Wales goalkeeper.
- 6 August 2015: Danny Hegan, 72, Northern Ireland, Ipswich Town, West Bromwich Albion, Wolverhampton Wanderers and Sunderland midfielder.
- 9 August 2015: Jack Hadlington, 82, Walsall winger.
- 12 August 2015: Chris Marustik, 54, Swansea City, Cardiff City, Newport County and Wales defender.
- 16 August 2015: Derek Stroud, 85, AFC Bournemouth and Grimsby Town winger.
- 17 August 2015: Sandy Kennon, 81, Huddersfield Town, Norwich City and Colchester United goalkeeper.
- 18 August 2015: Edgar Rumney, 78, Colchester United full back.
- 22 August 2015: Tommy Lowry, 69, Crewe Alexandra and Liverpool defender.
- 29 August 2015: Graham Leggat, 81, Scotland, Fulham, Birmingham City and Rotherham United winger.
- 30 August 2015: George Fisher, 90, Millwall, Fulham and Colchester United full back.
- September 2015: Ken Horne, 89, Brentford wing half.
- 6 September 2015: Ralph Milne, 54, Charlton Athletic, Bristol City and Manchester United midfielder.
- 6 September 2015: Tom Paul, 82, Grimsby Town winger.
- 11 September 2015: Fred Lucas (footballer), 81, Charlton Athletic and Crystal Palace wing half.
- 12 September 2015: Jim Doherty, 61, Notts County midfielder.
- 12 September 2015: Malcolm Graham, 81, Barnsley, Bristol City, Leyton Orient and Queens Park Rangers striker.
- 12 September 2015: Ron Springett, 80, England, Sheffield Wednesday and Queens Park Rangers goalkeeper.
- 14 September 2015: Bob Ledger, 77, Huddersfield Town, Oldham Athletic, Mansfield Town and Barrow midfielder.
- 14 September 2015: Barrie Meyer, 83, Bristol Rovers, Plymouth Argyle, Newport County and Bristol City inside forward.
- 15 September 2015: Tommy Thompson, 86, England, Newcastle United, Aston Villa, Preston North End, Stoke City and Barrow inside forward.
- 25 September 2015: Pat Dunne, 72, Republic of Ireland, Manchester United and Plymouth Argyle goalkeeper.
- 25 September 2015: Joe Wilson, 78, Workington, Nottingham Forest, Wolverhampton Wanderers and Newport County full back.
- 2 October 2015: Johnny Paton, 92, Chelsea, Brentford and Watford outside left, who also had a short spell as manager of Watford.
- 10 October 2015: Kane Ashcroft, 29, York City midfielder.
- 14 October 2015: Bobby Braithwaite, 78, Northern Ireland and Middlesbrough winger.
- 17 October 2015: Howard Kendall, 69, Preston North End, Everton, Birmingham City, Stoke City and Blackburn Rovers midfielder, who had successfully managed Everton and also had spells in charge of Blackburn Rovers, Manchester City, Notts County and Sheffield United.
- 17 October 2015: Johnny Hamilton, 66, Millwall midfielder.
- 19 October 2015: Ron Greener, 81, Newcastle United and Darlington centre half.
- 23 October 2015: Peter Price, 83, Darlington forward.
- 2 November 2015: Arthur Shaw, 91, Arsenal, Brentford and Watford wing half.
- 6 November 2015: Bobby Campbell, 78, Liverpool, Portsmouth and Aldershot wing half, who also managed Fulham, Portsmouth and Chelsea.
- 7 November 2015: David Shawcross, 74, Manchester City, Stockport County and Halifax Town wing half.
- 8 November 2015: Harry Clarke, 94, Darlington, Leeds United and Hartlepool United forward.
- 12 November 2015: Márton Fülöp, 32, Hungary, Sunderland, Manchester City, Ipswich Town and West Bromwich Albion goalkeeper.
- 17 November 2015: Jackie McGugan, 76, Leeds United and Tranmere Rovers defender.
- 27 November 2015: Ian Dargie, 84, Brentford centre half.
- 28 November 2015: Gerry Byrne, 77, England and Liverpool left back.
- 29 November 2015: Joe Marston, 89, Australia and Preston North End defender.
- 6 December 2015: Mick McLaughlin, 72, Newport County and Hereford United defender.
- 8 December 2015: Alan Hodgkinson, 79, England and Sheffield United goalkeeper.
- 19 December 2015: Jimmy Hill, 87, Brentford and Fulham forward, who also managed Coventry City and was chairman at Coventry, Charlton Athletic and Fulham.
- 23 December 2015: Don Howe, 80, England, West Bromwich Albion and Arsenal full back, who managed West Bromwich Albion, Arsenal and Queens Park Rangers as well as assistant coach with the England national team.
- 27 December 2015: Roy Swinbourne, 86, Wolverhampton Wanderers forward.
- 29 December 2015: Pavel Srnicek, 47, Czech Republic, Newcastle United, Sheffield Wednesday, Portsmouth and West Ham United goalkeeper.
- 31 December 2015: Steve Gohouri, 34, Ivory Coast and Wigan Athletic defender.
- 3 January 2016: Amby Fogarty, 82, Republic of Ireland, Sunderland and Hartlepool United midfielder.
- 4 January 2016: John Roberts, 69, Wales, Swansea City, Northampton Town, Arsenal, Birmingham City, Wrexham and Hull City defender.
- 5 January 2016: Percy Freeman, 70, West Bromwich Albion, Lincoln City and Reading forward.
- 12 January 2016: Tommy Mulgrew, 86, Northampton Town, Newcastle United, Southampton and Aldershot forward.
- 20 January 2016: Stuart Cowden, 90, Stoke City half back.
- 22 January 2016: Tommy Bryceland, 76, Norwich City and Oldham Athletic forward.
- 22 January 2016: John Dowie, 60, Fulham and Doncaster Rovers midfielder.
- 24 January 2016: Ken Satchwell, 76, Coventry City and Walsall striker.
- 24 January 2016: Eric Webster, 84, Manchester City wing half, who also had a spell as manager of Stockport County.
- 26 January 2016: Ray Pointer, 79, England, Burnley, Bury, Coventry City and Portsmouth striker.
- 27 January 2016: Peter Baker, 84, Tottenham Hotspur right back.
- 28 January 2016: Dave Thomson, 77, Leicester City forward.
- 4 February 2016: David Sloan, 74, Northern Ireland, Scunthorpe United, Oxford United and Walsall midfielder. (death announced on this date)
- 9 February 2016: Graham Moore, 74, Wales, Cardiff City, Chelsea, Manchester United, Northampton Town, Charlton Athletic and Doncaster Rovers midfielder.
- 10 February 2016: Phil Gartside, 63, Bolton Wanderers chairman.
- 15 February 2016: Paul Bannon, 58, Carlisle United and Bristol Rovers forward.
- 16 February 2016: Ronnie Blackman, 90, Reading, Nottingham Forest and Ipswich Town forward.
- 18 February 2016: Johnny Miller, 65, Ipswich Town, Norwich City, Mansfield Town and Port Vale winger.
- 19 February 2016: Freddie Goodwin, 82, Manchester United, Leeds United and Scunthorpe United wing half, who also managed Scunthorpe, Brighton & Hove Albion and Birmingham City.
- 28 February 2016: Alex Stenhouse, 83, Portsmouth and Southend United winger.
- 6 March 2016: Wally Bragg, 86, Brentford centre half.
- 14 March 2016: Davy Walsh, 92, Ireland (FAI), West Bromwich Albion, Aston Villa and Walsall centre forward.
- 16 March 2016: Alan Spavin, 74, Preston North End inside forward.
- March 2016: Jack Boxley, 84, Bristol City and Coventry City outside left.
- 19 March 2016: Jack Mansell, 88, Brighton & Hove Albion, Cardiff City and Portsmouth defender, who also managed Rotherham United and Reading amongst others.
- 30 March 2016: John King, 77, Everton, Bournemouth & Boscombe Athletic, Tranmere Rovers and Port Vale wing half, who had two notable spells as manager of Tranmere Rovers.
- 31 March 2016: Ian Britton, 61, Chelsea, Blackpool and Burnley midfielder.
- 31 March 2016: Jimmy Toner, 91. Leeds United winger.
- 4 April 2016: Ken Waterhouse, 86, Preston North End, Rotherham United, Bristol City and Darlington wing half.
- 5 April 2016: John Waite, 74, Grimsby Town winger.
- 6 April 2016: Garry Jones, 65, Bolton Wanderers, Blackpool and Hereford United forward.
- 8 April 2016: Fred Middleton, 85, Lincoln City wing half.
- 22 April 2016: John Lumsden, 55, Stoke City midfielder.
- 23 April 2016: Errol Crossan, 85, Gillingham, Southend United, Norwich City and Leyton Orient winger.
- 6 May 2016: Chris Mitchell, 27, Bradford City midfielder.
- 7 May 2016: George Ross, 73, Preston North End and Southport full back.
- 15 May 2016: Bobby McIlvenny, 89, Oldham Athletic, Bury, Southport and Barrow inside forward.
- 21 May 2016: Alan Lewis, 61, Derby County, Brighton & Hove Albion and Reading full back.
- 25 May 2016: Ian Gibson, 73, Accrington Stanley, Bradford Park Avenue, Middlesbrough, Coventry City, Cardiff City and A.F.C. Bournemouth midfielder.

== Retirements ==
- 8 June 2015: Wade Elliott, 36, former Bournemouth, Burnley, Birmingham City and Bristol City midfielder.
- 16 June 2015: John Oster, 36, former Wales, Grimsby Town, Everton, Sunderland, Burnley, Reading, Crystal Palace, Doncaster Rovers and Barnet midfielder.
- 10 July 2015: Jason Koumas, 35, former Wales, Tranmere Rovers, West Bromwich Albion and Wigan Athletic midfielder.
- 14 July 2015: Steven Caldwell, 34, former Scotland, Newcastle United, Sunderland, Burnley, Wigan Athletic and Birmingham City defender.
- 17 July 2015: James Chambers, 34, former West Bromwich Albion, Watford, Leicester City, Doncaster Rovers and Walsall full back
- 20 July 2015: Cherno Samba, 29, former Gambia and Plymouth Argyle striker.
- 4 August 2015: Keith Andrews, 34, former Republic of Ireland, Wolverhampton Wanderers, Hull City. Milton Keynes Dons, Blackburn Rovers, West Bromwich Albion and Bolton Wanderers midfielder.
- 9 August 2015: Lee Bell, 32, former Crewe Alexandra, Mansfield Town, Macclesfield Town and Burton Albion midfielder.
- 16 August 2015: Steve Banks, 43, former Gillingham, Blackpool, Bolton Wanderers, Stoke City and Wimbledon goalkeeper.
- 27 August 2015: Ian Harte, 37, former Republic of Ireland, Leeds United, Sunderland, Blackpool, Carlisle United, Reading and Bournemouth defender.
- 4 September 2015: Kevin Davies, 38, former England, Chesterfield, Southampton, Blackburn Rovers, Bolton Wanderers and Preston North End forward.
- 10 September 2015: Stuart Parnaby, 33, former Middlesbrough, Birmingham City and Hartlepool United defender.
- 14 September 2015: Anthony Griffith, 28, former Montserrat, Doncaster Rovers, Port Vale, Leyton Orient, Shrewsbury Town and Carlisle United midfielder.
- 15 September 2015: Johannes Ertl, 32, former Austria, Crystal Palace, Sheffield United and Portsmouth midfielder.
- 19 October 2015: Mitchell Hanson, 27, former Oxford United defender.
- 20 October 2015: Djibril Cissé, 34, former France, Liverpool and Queens Park Rangers forward.
- 2 November 2015: Anders Svensson, 39, former Sweden and Southampton midfielder.
- 10 November 2015: Anthony Réveillère, 35, former Sunderland defender.
- 11 December 2015: Gilberto Silva, 39, former Brazil and Arsenal midfielder.
- 21 December 2015: Damien Duff, 36, former Republic of Ireland, Blackburn Rovers, Chelsea, Newcastle United and Fulham winger.
- 7 January 2016: Jermaine Jenas, 32, former England, Nottingham Forest, Newcastle United, Tottenham Hotspur and Queens Park Rangers midfielder.
- 21 January 2016: Brett Ormerod, 39, former Blackpool, Southampton and Preston North End forward.
- 28 January 2016: Robert Earnshaw, 34, former Wales, Cardiff City, West Bromwich Albion, Norwich City, Derby County, Nottingham Forest and Blackpool forward.
- 28 January 2016: Darius Vassell, 35, former England, Aston Villa, Manchester City and Leicester City forward.
- 29 January 2016: Nemanja Vidić, 34, former Serbia and Manchester United defender.
- 1 February 2016: John Heitinga, 32, former Netherlands, Everton and Fulham defender.
- 3 February 2016: Keith Southern, 34, former Blackpool, Huddersfield Town and Fleetwood Town midfielder.
- 3 February 2016: Stuart Holden, 30, former USA and Bolton Wanderers midfielder.
- 13 February 2016: Jack Collison, 27, former Wales, West Ham United and Peterborough United midfielder.
- 19 February 2016: Andy Wilkinson, 31, former Stoke City right back.
- 1 May 2016: Patrick Kisnorbo, 35, former Australia, Leicester City, Leeds United and Ipswich Town defender.
- 9 May 2016: Michael Duff, 38, former Northern Ireland, Cheltenham Town and Burnley defender.
- 8 May 2016: Ruben Zadkovich, 29, former Australia, Notts County and Derby County midfielder.
- 17 May 2016: Richard Wright, 38, former England, Ipswich Town, Arsenal, Everton, West Ham United and Sheffield United goalkeeper.
- 18 May 2016: Barry Robson, 37, former Scotland, Middlesbrough and Sheffield United midfielder.
- 29 May 2016: Stephen Hunt, 34, former Republic of Ireland, Crystal Palace, Brentford, Reading, Hull City, Wolverhampton Wanderers, Ipswich Town and Coventry City midfielder.
- 30 May 2016: Richie Foran, 35, former Carlisle United and Southend United midfielder.
