= Stroud (disambiguation) =

Stroud is a town and civil parish in the county of Gloucestershire, England.

Stroud, Strouden or Strouds may also refer to:

== Places ==
In the United Kingdom

- Stroud District, Gloucestershire
- Stroud (UK Parliament constituency)
- Stroud, Hampshire, near Petersfield
- Stroud, Surrey, a place in England
- Stroud Green, a suburb in London, England
- Strouden Park, Bournemouth, UK

In the United States

- Strouds, Georgia
- Stroud, Oklahoma
- Stroud Township, Pennsylvania
- Strouds, West Virginia
- Strouds, Wyoming
- Stroud Preserve, a nature reserve in Chester County, Pennsylvania

Elsewhere

- Stroud, New South Wales, Australia
- Stroud, Ontario, Canada

== Other uses ==
- Stroud (surname)
- Stroud's, a restaurant in the Kansas City area in the United States
- Stroud, a coarse woollen fabric as used in blankets and traded to Native Americans for use in garments
- Stroud pound, a local currency in Stroud, Gloucestershire, England

== See also ==
- Strood, a town in the unitary authority of Medway in South East England
- Shroud, an item
