= Stroud (surname) =

Stroud is a surname. Notable people with the surname include:

- Angela Stroud (born 1981), Wisconsin politician
- Barry Stroud (1935–2019), American philosopher
- Byron Stroud (born 1969), Canadian musician
- Carlos Stroud (born 1942), American physicist
- C. J. Stroud (born 2001), American football player
- Chris Stroud (born 1982), American golfer
- David Stroud (born 1987), British footballer
- Derek Stroud (1930–2015), English footballer
- Don Stroud (born 1943), American actor
- Donna Stroud (born 1964), American lawyer and jurist
- Gregory Stroud (1892–1974), English operatic singer in Australia
- John Stroud (born 1957), American basketball player
- John Stroud (director) (1955–2009), British television director and producer
- Jonathan Stroud, author of the Bartimaeus Trilogy
- Ken Stroud (1908–2000), author of mathematics textbooks
- Kenny Stroud, British footballer
- Les Stroud, Canadian television survival enthusiast
- Marcus Stroud (born 1978), American football player
- Marion Boulton Stroud (1939–2015), American curator, author, and museum director
- Mike Stroud (disambiguation), several people with this name

- Mike Stroud (physician) (born 1955), British physician and explorer
- Mike Stroud (musician), guitarist in the New York electronic rock duo Ratatat

- Morris Stroud (1946–2016), American football player
- Peter Stroud, American guitarist
- Peter Stroud (soccer) (born 2002), American soccer player
- Philippa Stroud, Baroness Stroud, (born 1965) British think tanker
- Reuben W. Stroud (1841–1875), New York engineer and politician
- Rhonda Stroud (born 1971), American materials scientist and planetary scientist
- Robert Stroud (1890–1963), murderer, author, and subject of the book and film "Birdman of Alcatraz"
- Ronald S. Stroud (1933–2021), Canadian historian, academic, archeologist, and epigraphist.
