= Stroux =

Stroux is a surname. Notable people with the surname include:

- Johannes Stroux (1886–1954), German classicist
- Karl Heinz Stroux (1908–1985), German actor and director

== See also ==
- Stroud (surname)
