= Strouds, West Virginia =

Strouds
- Unincorporated community
- Location within the state of West Virginia Strouds (the United States)
- Coordinates: 38°23′16″N 80°36′59″W
- Country: United States
- State: West Virginia
- County: Webster
- Elevation: 2,106 ft (642 m)
- Time zone: UTC-5 (Eastern (EST))
  - Summer (DST): UTC-4 (EDT)
- GNIS ID: 1553100

Strouds is an unincorporated community in Webster County, West Virginia, United States.

The community takes its name from nearby Strouds Creek.
