= Rhonda Stroud =

American materials physicist

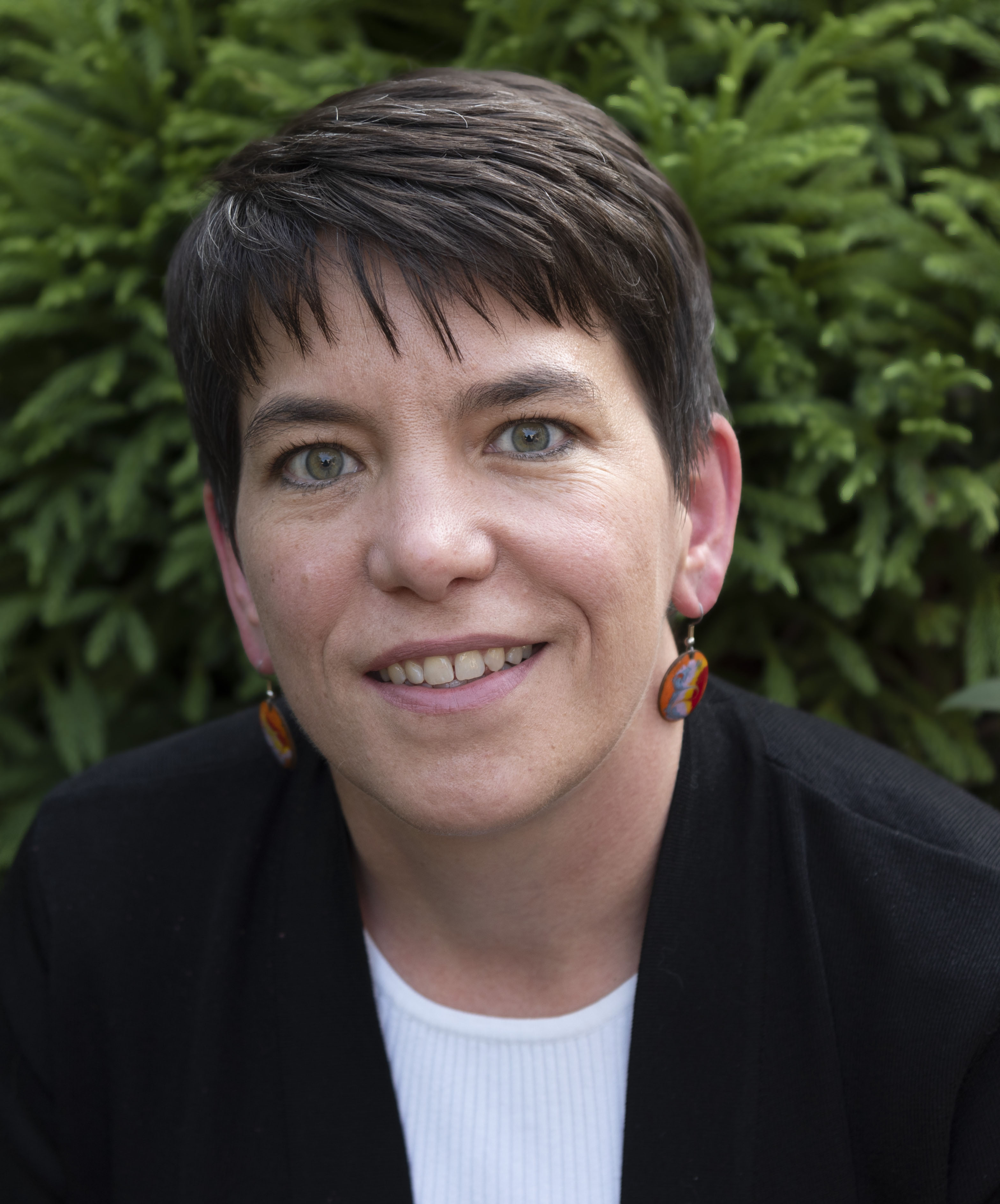
- Rhonda Stroud
- Born: Rochester, New York
- Education: Cornell University; California Institute of Technology; Washington University in St. Louis
- Scientific career
- Fields: materials physics, planetary science
- Workplaces: Naval Research Laboratory; Arizona State University

Rhonda M. Stroud (born 1971) is a materials physicist and planetary scientist at Arizona State University, where she serves as Director of the Buseck Center for Meteorite Studies. From 1998- 2022, she was a Research Physicist at the United States Naval Research Laboratory, where she led the Nanoscale Materials Section. She is known for her research on nanostructures, including quasicrystals and aerogel, and on the materials that make up comets and cosmic dust. She pioneered the use of focused ion beam technology in the study of meteorites.

== Education and career ==
Stroud graduated from Cornell University in 1991 and completed a Ph.D. in 1996 at Washington University in St. Louis. She joined the Naval Research Laboratory in 1996 as a postdoctoral researcher, and two years later obtained a permanent position there as a Research Physicist.

She served as president of the Microanalysis Society for 2018–2020.

== Recognition ==
Stroud was elected as a Fellow of the American Physical Society in 2010, of the Microscopy Society of America in 2021., and of the Microanalysis society in 2022. She is also a fellow of the Meteoritical Society. Asteroid 8468 Rhondastroud was named after her in 2012.
