= David Stroud =

English footballer

Personal information
- Place of birth: Swindon, England
- Height: 5 ft 10 in (1.78 m)
- Position: Midfielder

Senior career*
Years	Team	Apps	(Gls)
2005–2006	Swindon Town	2	(0)
2005	→ Basingstoke Town (loan)	5	(0)
2006	→ Basingstoke Town (loan)	2	(0)
2006–2008	Swindon Supermarine		
2009	Highworth Town		
- * Club domestic league appearances and goals

David Stroud (born 10 November 1987) is a footballer. He is the son of former Swindon Town favourite Kenny Stroud.

Stroud made his breakthrough into the Swindon Town first team in October 2005 when still a youth team player. With manager Iffy Onuora previously responsible for youth development, he gave Stroud a chance in a match at Huddersfield Town, Stroud produced a solid performance that impressed Onuora—his pace being his main attribute

After continuing in the first team the following week, a hamstring injury sidelined Stroud for a period, and he did not appear in the first team again until the New Year.

On 30 December 2006 it was announced that Stroud's contract would not be extended and was released from Swindon.

After being released from Swindon, David signed for Swindon Supermarine, and subsequently scored in their play off final win over Taunton Town on 5 May 2007.

He also spent two occasions on loan at Basingstoke Town whilst going up through the ranks at Swindon Town. In his second spell with Basingstoke he played in the club's famous first round F.A Cup win away at Chesterfield before being recalled by Swindon manager Paul Sturrock, forcing him to miss the second round tie against Aldershot Town
