= Stroud's (restaurant) =

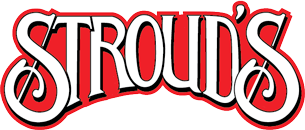

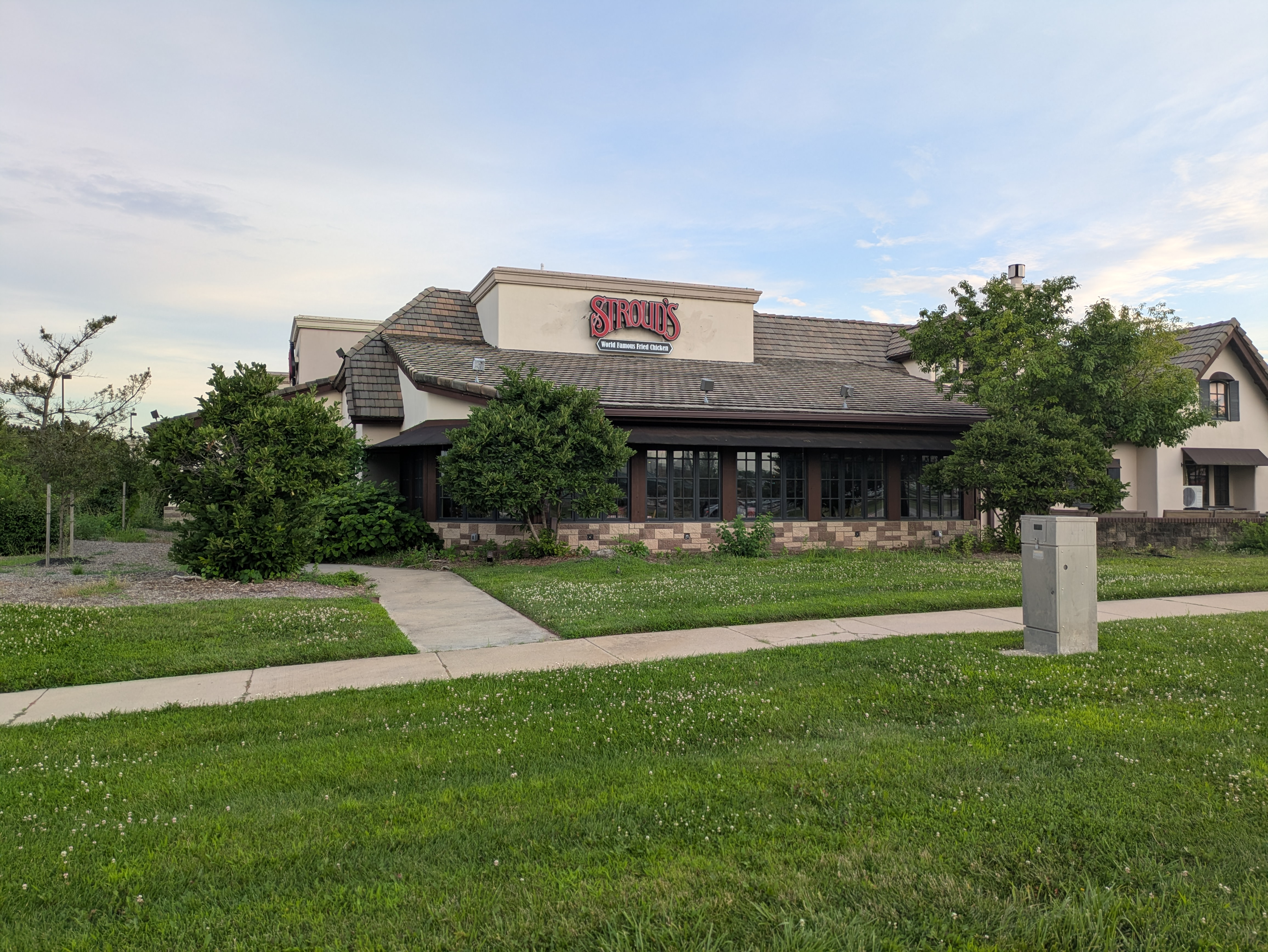
- Stroud's in Overland Park
- Interactive map of Stroud's

Restaurant information
- Established: 1933
- Location: 5410 NE Oak Ridge Drive, Kansas City, Missouri, 64119, United States
- Coordinates: 39.1947°N 94.5129°W
- Other locations: Overland Park, Kansas
- Website: www.stroudsrestaurant.com

Stroud's is a restaurant in the Kansas City metropolitan area, in the United States. The business was named one of "America's Classics" by the James Beard Foundation Awards.

== History ==
In 1933, Guy and Helen Stroud started a BBQ restaurant on the county line at 85th and Troost Avenue. When beef was rationed during World War II, the restaurant began serving a pan-fried chicken dinner for 35 cents. Other menu items at this time included long end ribs for 15 cents and goose livers for 10 cents.

In 1977, Mike Donegan and Jim Hogan purchased the restaurant, retaining several of the original recipes. The restaurant opened a second location in 1983 with the purchase of Oak Ridge Manor, a restored 1840s log cabin, by Mike Donegan, his twin brother Dennis Donegan, and Hogan. A third location followed in Wichita, Kansas, in 1992.

The original Troost Avenue location closed in 2006 due to eminent domain, but the restaurant subsequently opened locations in Fairway, Kansas, in 2008 and Overland Park, Kansas, in 2014. The Fairway location operated for over a decade before closing in October 2019; the building was demolished in March 2021 to make way for a retail development.

Following the Fairway closure, a carryout-focused spin-off called "Stroud’s Express" opened in Mission, Kansas, in May 2021. Despite expanding to full-service dining in 2022, the Mission location closed permanently in April 2023. A similar "Stroud's Express" location in Lee's Summit, Missouri, also closed around the same time. While Hogan sold his interest in the company in 2000, the Donegan family maintained operations until Mike Donegan's death in 2021. As of 2026, Stroud's continues to operate at its Overland Park and Oak Ridge Manor locations.

== Notable menu items ==
Stroud's is best known for their pan-fried chicken. Other popular dishes include fried catfish, homemade chicken noodle soup, and cinnamon rolls.

== Awards ==
- James Beard Award for Excellence
- Zagat Award for Best Restaurant

== Media ==
- Travel Channel's Man v. Food
- No Reservations
- Food Network's The Best Thing I Ever Ate
- KCPT's Check Please
