= Strouds Creek =

Stream in West Virginia, U.S.

Coordinates: 38°21′30″N 80°36′35″W

Strouds Creek is a stream in the U.S. state of West Virginia.

Strouds Creek was named after Adam Stroud, a pioneer settler.

== See also ==
- List of rivers of West Virginia
