= Kenny Stroud =

English footballer

Personal information
- Full name: Kenneth Allan Stroud
- Date of birth: 1 December 1953 (age 72)
- Place of birth: Fulham, England
- Positions: Midfielder; defender

Youth career
- Swindon Town

Senior career*
Years	Team	Apps	(Gls)
1971–1982	Swindon Town	311	(16)
1982–1983	Newport County	48	(0)
1983–1985	Bristol City	69	(4)
- * Club domestic league appearances and goals

Kenneth Allan "Kenny" Stroud (born 1 December 1953) is an English former footballer who made more than 400 appearances in the Football League playing for Swindon Town, where he spent the majority of his career, Newport County and Bristol City. He played as a midfielder or defender.

Stroud was born in Fulham, London. He played for the Swindon schools team that reached the national boys' final in 1969, and went on to become an England youth international. He made his first-team debut for Swindon Town on 4 September 1971, a goalless draw with Queens Park Rangers in the Second Division, a match in which highlights were shown that evening on BBC1's Match of the Day programme. Over the next eleven seasons he made 373 appearances for Swindon in all first-team competitions, scoring 19 goals. He finished his professional career at Newport County and then Bristol City.

Stroud's son David also played professionally for Swindon Town.
