= Jack Hadlington =

English footballer

Personal information
- Full name: John Hadlington
- Date of birth: 16 August 1933
- Place of birth: Brierley Hill, England
- Date of death: 9 August 2015 (aged 81)
- Place of death: Dudley, England
- Position: Forward

Senior career*
Years	Team	Apps	(Gls)
- Cradley Heath
1954–1955	Walsall	1	(0)
- Halesowen Town
- * Club domestic league appearances and goals

John Hadlington (16 August 1933 – 9 August 2015) was an English footballer who played in the Football League for Walsall.
