= Kane Ashcroft =

English footballer

Personal information
- Full name: Kane John Ashcroft
- Date of birth: 19 March 1986
- Place of birth: Leeds, England
- Date of death: 8 October 2015 (aged 29)
- Position: Midfielder

Youth career
- Sheffield Wednesday
- York City

Senior career*
Years	Team	Apps	(Gls)
2004–2006	York City	4	(0)
- * Club domestic league appearances and goals

Kane John Ashcroft (19 March 1986 – 10 October 2015) was an English footballer who played for York City.

He died at the age of 29 in October 2015 from cancer.
