= Mike Stroud =

Mike Stroud may refer to:

- Mike Stroud (physician) (born 1955), British physician and explorer
- Mike Stroud (musician), guitarist in the New York electronic rock duo Ratatat
