= Tom Paul (footballer) =

English footballer

Personal information
- Full name: Thomas Paul
- Date of birth: 14 May 1933
- Place of birth: Grimsby, England
- Date of death: 2015 (aged 81–82)
- Position: Winger

Senior career*
Years	Team	Apps	(Gls)
1954–1955	Immingham St Andrew's		
1955–1959	Grimsby Town	1	(0)
- * Club domestic league appearances and goals

Thomas Paul (14 May 1933 – 2015) was an English professional footballer who played as a winger.
