= Derek Stroud =

English footballer

Personal information
- Full name: Derek Neville Lester Stroud
- Date of birth: 11 February 1930
- Place of birth: Wimborne, England
- Date of death: 2015 (aged 84–85)
- Height: 5 ft 9 in (1.75 m)
- Position: Winger

Senior career*
| Years | Team | Apps | (Gls) |
| 1947–1948 | Wimborne Town | | |
| 1948–1950 | Poole Town | | |
| 1950–1953 | Bournemouth & Boscombe Athletic | 79 | (17) |
| 1953–1955 | Grimsby Town | 71 | (12) |
| 1955–1963 | Dorchester Town | | |
| 1963–1964 | Portland United | | |
| 1964–196? | Ringwood Town | | |
- * Club domestic league appearances and goals

Derek Neville Lester Stroud (11 February 1930 – 2015) was an English professional footballer who played as a winger.
