= 2016–17 1. FSV Mainz 05 season =

Mainz 05
2016–17 season
- Sport director: Christian Heidel
- President: Harald Strutz
- Manager: Martin Schmidt
- Stadium: OPEL ARENA
- Bundesliga: 15th
- DFB-Pokal: Second round
- Europa League: Group stage
- Top goalscorer: League: Yunus Mallı (6 goals); All: Yunus Mallı (8 goals)
- Highest home attendance: 34,000
- Lowest home attendance: 12,860
- Average home league attendance: 29,096
- Biggest win: Augsburg 1–3 Mainz; Mainz 2–0 Ingolstadt; Mainz 4–2 Freiburg; Mainz 2–0 Gabala; Mainz 3–1 Hamburg; Mainz 2–0 Augsburg; Leverkusen 0–2 Mainz; Mainz 4–2 Frankfurt
- Biggest defeat: Anderlecht 6–1 Mainz
Home colours	Away colours	Third colours
- All statistics correct as of 27 May 2017.

The 2016–17 1. FSV Mainz 05 season is the 112th season in the football club's history and 8th consecutive and 11th overall season in the top flight of German football, the Bundesliga, having been promoted from the 2. Bundesliga in 2009. In addition to the domestic league, Mainz will also participate in this season's edition of the domestic cup, the DFB-Pokal. This will be the 6th season for the club in the Opel Arena, located in Mainz, Germany. The stadium has a capacity of 34,034. The season covers a period from 1 July 2016 to 30 June 2017.

== Players ==
=== Squad ===
Note: Flags indicate national team as defined under FIFA eligibility rules; some limited exceptions apply. Players may hold more than one non-FIFA nationality.

No.	Pos.	Nation	Player
1	GK	DEN	Jonas Lössl
2	DF	ITA	Giulio Donati
3	DF	NGR	Leon Balogun
6	MF	GER	Danny Latza
7	MF	SWE	Robin Quaison
8	MF	GER	Levin Öztunalı
9	FW	JPN	Yoshinori Muto
10	FW	ESP	Bojan Krkić (on loan from Stoke City)
11	FW	DEN	Emil Berggreen
15	FW	COL	Jhon Córdoba
16	DF	GER	Stefan Bell
17	MF	ESP	Jairo Samperio
18	DF	GER	Daniel Brosinski
19	DF	CRO	Marin Šverko
20	MF	SUI	Fabian Frei
21	FW	AUT	Karim Onisiwo

No.	Pos.	Nation	Player
22	DF	BRA	André Ramalho (on loan from Bayer Leverkusen)
24	DF	FRA	Gaëtan Bussmann
25	MF	CIV	Jean-Philippe Gbamin
26	DF	GER	Niko Bungert (Captain)
29	MF	GER	Devante Parker
30	MF	KOS	Besar Halimi
32	FW	ARG	Pablo de Blasis
33	GK	GER	Jannik Huth
36	FW	GER	Aaron Seydel
38	MF	GER	Gerrit Holtmann
42	DF	GER	Alexander Hack
45	MF	GER	Suat Serdar
46	GK	GER	Florian Müller
47	MF	GER	Philipp Klement
—	MF	GER	Maximilian Beister

== Competitions ==
Win Draw Loss

=== Overview ===
Competition	First match	Last match	Starting round	Final position	Record							
Competition	First match	Last match	Starting round	Final position	Pld	W	D	L	GF	GA	GD	Win %
Bundesliga	27 August 2016	20 May 2017	Matchday 1	15th	34	10	7	17	44	55	−11	29.41
DFB-Pokal	21 August 2016	26 October 2016	First round	Second round	2	0	1	1	4	5	−1	0.00
Europa League	15 September 2016	8 December 2016	Group stage	Group stage	6	2	3	1	8	10	−2	33.33
Total					42	12	11	19	56	70	−14	28.57

Last updated: 27 May 2017
Source: Competitions

=== Bundesliga ===
==== League table ====
Pos	Team	Pld	W	D	L	GF	GA	GD	Pts	Qualification or relegation
13	FC Augsburg	34	9	11	14	35	51	−16	38	
14	Hamburger SV	34	10	8	16	33	61	−28	38	
15	Mainz 05	34	10	7	17	44	55	−11	37	
16	VfL Wolfsburg (O)	34	10	7	17	34	52	−18	37	Qualification for the relegation play-offs
17	FC Ingolstadt (R)	34	8	8	18	36	57	−21	32	Relegation to 2. Bundesliga

Source: DFB
Rules for classification: 1) Points; 2) Goal difference; 3) Goals scored; 4) Head-to-head points; 5) Head-to-head goal difference; 6) Head-to-head away goals scored; 7) Away goals scored; 8) Play-off.
(O) Play-off winners; (R) Relegated

==== Results summary ====
Overall								Home						Away					
Pld	W	D	L	GF	GA	GD	Pts	W	D	L	GF	GA	GD	W	D	L	GF	GA	GD
34	10	7	17	44	55	−11	37	7	4	6	30	26	+4	3	3	11	14	29	−15

Last updated: 27 May 2017.
Source: Bundesliga

==== Results by round ====
Round	1	2	3	4	5	6	7	8	9	10	11	12	13	14	15	16	17	18	19	20	21	22	23	24	25	26	27	28	29	30	31	32	33	34
Ground	A	H	A	A	H	A	H	A	H	A	H	A	H	A	H	A	H	H	A	H	H	A	H	A	H	A	H	A	H	A	H	A	H	A
Result	L	D	W	W	L	D	W	L	W	L	W	L	L	L	W	L	D	D	L	W	L	W	D	L	L	L	L	L	W	D	L	D	W	L
Position	12	14	9	7	8	11	7	9	9	10	8	9	10	11	8	10	11	10	13	12	12	11	11	12	12	15	15	15	15	13	14	15	13	15

Updated to match(es) played on 27 May 2017. Source: Bundesliga
A = Away; H = Home; W = Win; D = Draw; L = Loss

==== Matches ====
27 August 2016 1	Borussia Dortmund	2–1	Mainz 05	Dortmund
15:30 CEST (UTC+2)	Aubameyang 17', 89' (pen.)	Report	Brosinski (yellow card) 13'; Serdar (yellow card) 44'; Onisiwo (yellow card) 88'; Muto 90+2'	Stadium: SIGNAL IDUNA PARK; Attendance: 81,360; Referee: Robert Hartmann

11 September 2016 2	Mainz 05	4–4	1899 Hoffenheim	Mainz
17:30 CEST (UTC+2)	de Blasis 3', 23', (yellow card) 45+2'; Córdoba 27'; Öztunalı 43'; Bussmann (red card) 57'	Report	Wagner 39', (yellow card) 60'; Uth (yellow card) 67', (goal) 71', 72'; Szalai 84'; Rupp (yellow card) 86'	Stadium: OPEL ARENA; Attendance: 27,408; Referee: Markus Schmidt

18 September 2016 3	FC Augsburg	1–3	Mainz 05	Augsburg
15:30 CEST (UTC+2)	Stafylidis 73'; Gouweleeuw (yellow card) 77'	Report	Córdoba 7', (yellow card) 49'; Mallı 75'; Onisiwo (yellow card) 76'; Muto 81'; Rodríguez (red card) 90+3'	Stadium: WWK ARENA; Attendance: 26,115; Referee: Bastian Dankert

21 September 2016 4	Werder Bremen	1–2	Mainz 05	Bremen
20:00 CEST (UTC+2)	Hajrović 12'; Manneh (yellow card) 24'; Grillitsch (yellow card) 88'	Report	Frei (yellow card) 71'; Mallı 87'; de Blasis 90+2', (yellow card) 90+3'	Stadium: Weser-Stadion; Attendance: 37,108; Referee: Wolfgang Stark

24 September 2016 5	Mainz 05	2–3	Bayer Leverkusen	Mainz
15:30 CEST (UTC+2)	Brosinski (yellow card) 11'; Mallı 31'; Bell 35', (yellow card) 42'; Córdoba (yellow card) 45'	Report	Dragović (yellow card) 21'; Hernández 32', 66', 90+2'; Aránguiz (yellow card) 45+1'	Stadium: OPEL ARENA; Attendance: 25,274; Referee: Günter Perl

2 October 2016 6	VfL Wolfsburg	0–0	Mainz 05	Wolfsburg
15:30 CEST (UTC+2)		Report		Stadium: VOLKSWAGEN ARENA; Attendance: 25,876; Referee: Benjamin Brand

16 October 2016 7	Mainz 05	2–1	Darmstadt 98	Mainz
15:30 CEST (UTC+2)	de Blasis 5'; Brosinski (yellow card) 38'; Mallı 56' (pen.); Bell (yellow card) 61'; Córdoba (yellow card) 90+3'	Report	Milošević (yellow card) 23'; Gondorf 90+2'	Stadium: OPEL ARENA; Attendance: 29,987; Referee: Felix Brych

23 October 2016 8	Schalke 04	3–0	Mainz 05	Gelsenkirchen
17:30 CEST (UTC+2)	Bentaleb 23', 61'; Meyer 48'; Höwedes (yellow card) 72'; Kolašinac (yellow card) 77'	Report	Balogun (yellow card) 21'; Córdoba (yellow card) 41'; Bell (yellow card) 82'	Stadium: VELTINS-Arena; Attendance: 59,357; Referee: Daniel Siebert

29 October 2016 9	Mainz 05	2–0	FC Ingolstadt	Mainz
15:30 CEST (UTC+2)	Mallı 51' (pen.); Jairo (yellow card) 64'; Öztunalı 85'	Report	Christiansen (yellow card) 72' (yellow-red card) 86'	Stadium: OPEL ARENA; Attendance: 24,197; Referee: Manuel Gräfe

6 November 2016 10	RB Leipzig	3–1	Mainz 05	Leipzig
15:30 CET (UTC+1)	Werner 3', 44'; Forsberg 21'	Report	Brosinski (yellow card) 54'; Bell 74', (yellow card) 80'; Ramalho (yellow card) 85'	Stadium: Red Bull Arena; Attendance: 42,558; Referee: Marco Fritz

19 November 2016 11	Mainz 05	4–2	SC Freiburg	Mainz
15:30 CET (UTC+1)	Bungert 15'; Mallı 20' (pen.); Bell (yellow card) 37', (goal) 82'; Frei (yellow card) 57'; Onisiwo (yellow card) 65', (goal) 90+5'; Brosinski (yellow card) 88'	Report	Niederlechner (yellow card) 1'; Söyüncü (yellow card) 19'; Grifo 67', (yellow card) 88'; Petersen 85'	Stadium: OPEL ARENA; Attendance: 26,573; Referee: Patrick Ittrich

27 November 2016 12	Hertha BSC	2–1	Mainz 05	Berlin
17:30 CET (UTC+1)	Ibišević 36', 67', (yellow card) 58' (yellow-red card) 74'; Darida (yellow card) 88'	Report	Seydel 25'; Gbamin (yellow card) 30' (yellow-red card) 62'	Stadium: Olympiastadion Berlin; Attendance: 37,852; Referee: Guido Winkmann

2 December 2016 13	Mainz 05	1–3	Bayern Munich	Mainz
20:30 CET (UTC+1)	Córdoba 4', (yellow card) 83'; Bell (yellow card) 85'; Balogun (yellow card) 90+1'	Report	Lewandowski 8', 90+2', (yellow card) 76'; Robben 21'; Martínez (yellow card) 44'	Stadium: OPEL ARENA; Attendance: 34,000; Referee: Daniel Siebert

11 December 2016 14	Borussia Mönchengladbach	1–0	Mainz 05	Mönchengladbach
15:30 CET (UTC+1)	Hahn (yellow card) 12'; Christensen 76'; Jantschke (yellow card) 90+3'	Report	Gbamin (yellow card) 79' (yellow-red card) 90'	Stadium: BORUSSIA-PARK; Attendance: 48,037; Referee: Robert Hartmann

17 December 2016 15	Mainz 05	3–1	Hamburger SV	Mainz
15:30 CET (UTC+1)	Latza 35', 56', 67', (yellow card) 68'; de Blasis (yellow card) 41'	Report	Wood 21'; Spahić (yellow card) 43'; Gregoritsch (yellow card) 53'; Ostrzolek (yellow card) 79'	Stadium: OPEL ARENA; Attendance: 30,179; Referee: Deniz Aytekin

20 December 2016 16	Eintracht Frankfurt	3–0	Mainz 05	Frankfurt
20:00 CET (UTC+1)	Hrgota 18', 85', (yellow card) 48'; Rebić (yellow card) 53'; Mascarell (yellow card) 64'; Barkok 75'	Report	Córdoba (red card) 55'	Stadium: Commerzbank-Arena; Attendance: 48,500; Referee: Günter Perl

22 January 2017 17	Mainz 05	0–0	1. FC Köln	Mainz
17:30 CET (UTC+1)	Bussmann (yellow card) 41'	Report	Sørensen (yellow card) 64'	Stadium: OPEL ARENA; Attendance: 29,314; Referee: Felix Brych

29 January 2017 18	Mainz 05	1–1	Borussia Dortmund	Mainz
17:30 CET (UTC+1)	Gbamin (yellow card) 54'; Jairo (yellow card) 75'; Latza 83'	Report	Reus 3'; Schürrle (yellow card) 75'	Stadium: OPEL ARENA; Attendance: 34,000; Referee: Felix Zwayer

4 February 2017 19	1899 Hoffenheim	4–0	Mainz 05	Sinsheim
15:30 CET (UTC+1)	Uth 5'; Baumann (yellow card) 51'; Kadeřábek (yellow card) 59'; Terrazzino 81'; Szalai 86', 90+1'	Report	Córdoba (yellow card) 37'; Öztunalı (yellow card) 90'	Stadium: WIRSOL Rhein-Neckar-Arena; Attendance: 26,078; Referee: Guido Winkmann

10 February 2017 20	Mainz 05	2–0	FC Augsburg	Mainz
20:30 CET (UTC+1)	Öztunalı 31'; Latza (yellow card) 49'; Jairo 62' (pen.)	Report	Hitz (yellow card) 60'; Hinteregger (yellow card) 71'; Gouweleeuw (yellow card) 73'	Stadium: OPEL ARENA; Attendance: 23,371; Referee: Manuel Gräfe

18 February 2017 21	Mainz 05	0–2	Werder Bremen	Mainz
15:30 CET (UTC+1)	Donati (yellow card) 39'; Latza (yellow card) 50'; Jairo (yellow card) 56'	Report	Gnabry 16'; Delaney 23'; Junuzović (yellow card) 25'; Gebre Selassie (yellow card) 44'; Fritz (yellow card) 76'; Wiedwald (yellow card) 90+2'	Stadium: OPEL ARENA; Attendance: 27,281; Referee: Deniz Aytekin

25 February 2017 22	Bayer Leverkusen	0–2	Mainz 05	Leverkusen
15:30 CET (UTC+1)	Bender (yellow card) 10'	Report	Bell 3'; Öztunalı 11'; Muto (yellow card) 74'; Latza (yellow card) 83'; Gbamin (yellow card) 90+4'	Stadium: BayArena; Attendance: 27,086; Referee: Benjamin Brand

4 March 2017 23	Mainz 05	1–1	VfL Wolfsburg	Mainz
15:30 CET (UTC+1)	Córdoba 24'	Report	Gómez 20'	Stadium: OPEL ARENA; Attendance: 27,238; Referee: Benjamin Cortus

11 March 2017 24	Darmstadt 98	2–1	Mainz 05	Darmstadt
15:30 CET (UTC+1)	Sulu 5'; Sam 12' (pen.); Vrančić (yellow card) 53' (yellow-red card) 59'; Gondorf (yellow card) 77'; Platte (yellow card) 90+1'; Niemeyer (yellow card) 90+1'	Report	Ramalho (yellow card) 18'; Bell (yellow card) 45' (yellow-red card) 89'; Quaison 45+3'; Córdoba (yellow card) 66'	Stadium: Jonathan-Heimes-Stadion am Böllenfalltor; Attendance: 17,400; Referee: Frank Willenborg

19 March 2017 25	Mainz 05	0–1	Schalke 04	Mainz
15:30 CET (UTC+1)	Jairo (yellow card) 25'; Bungert (yellow card) 63'	Report	Burgstaller (yellow card) 28'; Kolašinac 50'; Badstuber (yellow card) 69'; Schöpf (yellow card) 82'; Choupo-Moting (yellow card) 90+4'	Stadium: OPEL ARENA; Attendance: 30,847; Referee: Wolfgang Stark

2 April 2017 26	FC Ingolstadt	2–1	Mainz 05	Ingolstadt
15:30 CEST (UTC+2)	Brégerie 10'; Matip (yellow card) 59'; Hadergjonaj (yellow card) 65', (goal) 73'; Tisserand (yellow card) 85'; Hansen (yellow card) 90+3'	Report	Balogun (yellow card) 33'; Ramalho (yellow card) 68'; Matip 71' (o.g.); Latza (yellow card) 76'	Stadium: Audi Sportpark; Attendance: 14,000; Referee: Patrick Ittrich

5 April 2017 27	Mainz 05	2–3	RB Leipzig	Mainz
20:00 CEST (UTC+2)	Jairo 69' (pen.), (yellow card) 74'; Brosinski (yellow card) 71'; Córdoba (yellow card) 75'; Frei (yellow card) 78'; Gbamin (red card) 89'; Muto 90+1'; de Blasis (yellow card) 90+3'; Donati (yellow card) 90+4'	Report	Upamecano (yellow card) 30'; Sabitzer 48', (yellow card) 71'; Werner 52'; Bernardo (yellow card) 56'; Keïta 81'; Ilsanker (yellow card) 90+3'	Stadium: OPEL ARENA; Attendance: 26,379; Referee: Tobias Stieler

8 April 2017 28	SC Freiburg	1–0	Mainz 05	Freiburg im Breisgau
15:30 CEST (UTC+2)	Petersen 70'	Report	Bell (yellow card) 39'; Ramalho (yellow card) 59'; Latza (yellow card) 89'	Stadium: Schwarzwald-Stadion; Attendance: 24,000; Referee: Harm Osmers

15 April 2017 29	Mainz 05	1–0	Hertha BSC	Mainz
15:30 CEST (UTC+2)	Brooks 45+1' (o.g.); Donati (yellow card) 71'	Report	Mittelstädt (yellow card) 45+2'; Esswein (yellow card) 63'; Brooks (yellow card) 90'	Stadium: OPEL ARENA; Attendance: 30,579; Referee: Deniz Aytekin

22 April 2017 30	Bayern Munich	2–2	Mainz 05	Munich
15:30 CEST (UTC+2)	Robben 16'; Rafinha (yellow card) 43'; Thiago 73'	Report	Bojan 3'; Brosinski 40' (pen.); Onisiwo (yellow card) 89'	Stadium: Allianz Arena; Attendance: 75,000; Referee: Frank Willenborg

29 April 2017 31	Mainz 05	1–2	Borussia Mönchengladbach	Mainz
15:30 CEST (UTC+2)	Muto (yellow card) 66', (goal) 89'	Report	Stindl 31'; N. Schulz 46'; Elvedi (yellow card) 87'	Stadium: OPEL ARENA; Attendance: 34,000; Referee: Sascha Stegemann

7 May 2017 32	Hamburger SV	0–0	Mainz 05	Hamburg
15:30 CEST (UTC+2)	Sakai (yellow card) 70'; Mavraj (yellow card) 80'	Report	Donati (yellow card) 78'	Stadium: Volksparkstadion; Attendance: 53,915; Referee: Daniel Siebert

13 May 2017 33	Mainz 05	4–2	Eintracht Frankfurt	Mainz
15:30 CEST (UTC+2)	Córdoba 60'; Bell 62', (yellow card) 72'; Muto 76', (yellow card) 77'; Bojan (yellow card) 89'; de Blasis 90+3' (pen.), (yellow card) 90+4'	Report	Chandler (yellow card) 12'; Hrgota 42'; Seferovic 50'; Fabián (yellow card) 53'; Rebić (yellow card) 84'; Besuschkow (yellow card) 90'	Stadium: OPEL ARENA; Attendance: 34,000; Referee: Marco Fritz

20 May 2017 34	1. FC Köln	2–0	Mainz 05	Cologne
15:30 CEST (UTC+2)	Rausch (yellow card) 20'; Hector 43'; Klünter (yellow card) 64'; Osako 87'	Report	Bell (yellow card) 45+1'	Stadium: RheinEnergieSTADION; Attendance: 50,000; Referee: Robert Hartmann

=== DFB-Pokal ===
21 August 2016 First round	SpVgg Unterhaching	3–3 (2–4 p)	Mainz 05	Unterhaching
15:30 CEST (UTC+2)	Winkler (yellow card) 15'; Hain 33', 89'; Welzmüller (yellow card) 40'; Lux 90+3'; Bauer (yellow card) 117'	Report	Córdoba 21'; Donati (yellow card) 25' (yellow-red card) 114'; Bungert (yellow card) 37'; Frei 64'; Mallı 88'	Stadium: Alpenbauer Sportpark; Attendance: 7,000; Referee: Arne Aarnink
	Penalties
	Stahl (penalty missed); Hain (penalty missed); Dombrowka (penalty scored); Einsiedler (penalty scored)		(penalty scored) de Blasis; (penalty scored) Mallı; (penalty scored) Clemens; (penalty scored) Rodríguez

26 October 2016 Second round	Greuther Fürth	2–1	Mainz 05	Fürth
18:30 CEST (UTC+2)	Žulj (yellow card) 43'; Sararer 79'; Berisha 90'	Report	Hack (yellow card) 55'; Córdoba 68'	Stadium: Sportpark Ronhof Thomas Sommer; Attendance: 5,975; Referee: Guido Winkmann

=== UEFA Europa League ===
==== Group stage ====
Pos	Team	Pld	W	D	L	GF	GA	GD	Pts	Qualification	SET	AND	MNZ	QAB
1	(France) Saint-Étienne	6	3	3	0	8	5	+3	12	Advance to knockout phase	—	1–1	0–0	1–0
2	(Belgium) Anderlecht	6	3	2	1	16	8	+8	11	Advance to knockout phase	2–3	—	6–1	3–1
3	(Germany) Mainz 05	6	2	3	1	8	10	−2	9		1–1	1–1	—	2–0
4	(Azerbaijan) Gabala	6	0	0	6	5	14	−9	0		1–2	1–3	2–3	—

Source: UEFA
Rules for classification: Group stage tiebreakers

15 September 2016 1	Mainz 05 (Germany)	1–1	(France) Saint-Étienne	Mainz, Germany
19:00 CEST (UTC+2)	Bungert 57', (yellow card) 78'; Donati (yellow card) 83'	Report	Berić 88'	Stadium: OPEL ARENA; Attendance: 20,275; Referee: Svein Oddvar Moen (Norway)

29 September 2016 2	Gabala (Azerbaijan)	2–3	(Germany) Mainz 05	Baku, Azerbaijan
19:00 AZT (UTC+4); 17:00 CEST (UTC+2)	Ozobić (yellow card) 47'; Qurbanov 57' (pen.); Zenjov 62', (yellow card) 70'; Vernydub (yellow card) 78'; Stanković (yellow card) 90+1'	Report	Hack (yellow card) 14'; Muto 41'; Lössl (yellow card) 57'; Córdoba 68'; Öztunalı 78', (yellow card) 87'	Stadium: Bakcell Arena; Attendance: 6,500; Referee: Gediminas Mažeika (Lithuania)

20 October 2016 3	Mainz 05 (Germany)	1–1	(Belgium) Anderlecht	Mainz, Germany
21:05 CEST (UTC+2)	Mallı 10' (pen.); Bell (yellow card) 52'; Brosinski (yellow card) 64'	Report	Hanni (yellow card) 22'; Nuytinck (yellow card) 54'; Teodorczyk 65'; Deschacht (yellow card) 70'; Capel (yellow card) 90'	Stadium: OPEL ARENA; Attendance: 21,317; Referee: Jesús Gil Manzano (Spain)

3 November 2016 4	Anderlecht (Belgium)	6–1	(Germany) Mainz 05	Anderlecht, Belgium
19:00 CET (UTC+1)	Stanciu 9', 41'; Tielemans 62'; Acheampong (yellow card) 68'; Teodorczyk 89', 90+4' (pen.); Bruno 90+2'	Report	de Blasis 15'; Donati (yellow card) 50'; Bell (yellow card) 73'	Stadium: Constant Vanden Stockstadion; Attendance: 13,275; Referee: Andreas Ekberg (Sweden)

24 November 2016 5	Saint-Étienne (France)	0–0	(Germany) Mainz 05	Saint-Étienne, France
21:05 CET (UTC+1)	Perrin (yellow card) 35'	Report	Balogun (yellow card) 17'; Onisiwo (yellow card) 22'; Brosinski (yellow card) 65'; Öztunalı (yellow card) 88'; Mallı (yellow card) 90+1'	Stadium: Stade Geoffroy-Guichard; Attendance: 21,750; Referee: Bas Nijhuis (Netherlands)

8 December 2016 6	Mainz 05 (Germany)	2–0	(Azerbaijan) Gabala	Mainz, Germany
19:00 CET (UTC+1)	Hack 30'; de Blasis 40'; Bussmann (yellow card) 66'; Jairo (yellow card) 76'	Report		Stadium: OPEL ARENA; Attendance: 12,860; Referee: Simon Lee Evans (Wales)

== Statistics ==
=== Appearances and goals ===
No.	Pos	Nat	Player	Total		Bundesliga		DFB-Pokal		Europa League	
No.	Pos	Nat	Player	Apps	Goals	Apps	Goals	Apps	Goals	Apps	Goals
Goalkeepers
1	GK	(Denmark) DEN	Jonas Lössl	34	0	27	0	2	0	5	0
33	GK	(Germany) GER	Jannik Huth	8	0	7	0	0	0	1	0
46	GK	(Germany) GER	Florian Müller	0	0	0	0	0	0	0	0
Defenders
2	DF	(Italy) ITA	Giulio Donati	37	0	31+1	0	1	0	4	0
3	DF	(Nigeria) NGR	Leon Balogun	20	0	13+4	0	0+1	0	2	0
16	DF	(Germany) GER	Stefan Bell	38	5	30+1	5	1	0	6	0
18	DF	(Germany) GER	Daniel Brosinski	35	1	27+2	1	2	0	3+1	0
19	DF	(Croatia) CRO	Marin Šverko	0	0	0	0	0	0	0	0
22	DF	(Brazil) BRA	André Ramalho	20	0	12+6	0	0	0	2	0
24	DF	(France) FRA	Gaëtan Bussmann	20	0	12+2	0	1	0	5	0
25	DF	(Ivory Coast) CIV	Jean-Philippe Gbamin	31	0	21+4	0	1	0	5	0
26	DF	(Germany) GER	Niko Bungert	14	2	9+1	1	2	0	2	1
42	DF	(Germany) GER	Alexander Hack	18	1	13+2	0	1	0	2	1
Midfielders
6	MF	(Germany) GER	Danny Latza	21	4	18+3	4	0	0	0	0
7	MF	(Sweden) SWE	Robin Quaison	11	1	6+5	1	0	0	0	0
8	MF	(Germany) GER	Levin Öztunalı	36	5	23+7	4	1	0	1+4	1
17	MF	(Spain) ESP	Jairo Samperio	22	2	11+6	2	1	0	1+3	0
20	MF	(Switzerland) SUI	Fabian Frei	29	1	19+5	0	1	1	2+2	0
29	MF	(Germany) GER	Devante Parker	0	0	0	0	0	0	0	0
30	MF	(Kosovo) KOS	Besar Halimi	0	0	0	0	0	0	0	0
38	MF	(Germany) GER	Gerrit Holtmann	6	0	1+4	0	0	0	0+1	0
45	MF	(Germany) GER	Suat Serdar	14	0	4+4	0	1+1	0	3+1	0
47	MF	(Germany) GER	Philipp Klement	0	0	0	0	0	0	0	0
Forwards
9	FW	(Japan) JPN	Yoshinori Muto	21	6	10+9	5	0	0	2	1
10	FW	(Spain) ESP	Bojan Krkić	11	1	8+3	1	0	0	0	0
11	FW	(Denmark) DEN	Emil Berggreen	0	0	0	0	0	0	0	0
15	FW	(Colombia) COL	Jhon Córdoba	37	8	27+2	5	1+1	2	4+2	1
21	FW	(Austria) AUT	Karim Onisiwo	21	1	10+6	1	1+1	0	3	0
32	FW	(Argentina) ARG	Pablo de Blasis	39	7	17+15	5	2	0	5	2
36	FW	(Germany) GER	Aaron Seydel	8	1	1+5	1	0	0	0+2	0
41	FW	(France) FRA	Mounir Bouziane	1	0	0+1	0	0	0	0	0
Players transferred out during the season
5	MF	(Spain) ESP	José Rodríguez	5	0	0+2	0	2	0	1	0
10	MF	(Turkey) TUR	Yunus Mallı	24	8	15+1	6	1+1	1	5+1	1
23	GK	(Italy) ITA	Gianluca Curci	0	0	0	0	0	0	0	0
27	MF	(Germany) GER	Christian Clemens	6	0	2+1	0	0+1	0	2	0

Last updated: 20 May 2017
Source: Competitions

=== Goalscorers ===
Rank	No.	Pos	Nat	Name	Bundesliga	DFB-Pokal	UEFA EL	Total
1	10	MF	(Turkey)	Yunus Mallı	6	1	1	8
1	15	FW	(Colombia)	Jhon Córdoba	5	2	1	8
3	32	FW	(Argentina)	Pablo de Blasis	5	0	2	7
4	9	FW	(Japan)	Yoshinori Muto	5	0	1	6
5	8	MF	(Germany)	Levin Öztunalı	4	0	1	5
5	16	DF	(Germany)	Stefan Bell	5	0	0	5
7	6	MF	(Germany)	Danny Latza	4	0	0	4
8	17	MF	(Spain)	Jairo Samperio	2	0	0	2
8	26	DF	(Germany)	Niko Bungert	1	0	1	2
10	7	MF	(Sweden)	Robin Quaison	1	0	0	1
10	10	FW	(Spain)	Bojan Krkić	1	0	0	1
10	18	DF	(Germany)	Daniel Brosinski	1	0	0	1
10	20	MF	(Switzerland)	Fabian Frei	0	1	0	1
10	21	FW	(Austria)	Karim Onisiwo	1	0	0	1
10	36	FW	(Germany)	Aaron Seydel	1	0	0	1
10	42	DF	(Germany)	Alexander Hack	0	0	1	1
Own goal					2	0	0	2
Totals					44	4	8	56

Last updated: 13 May 2017

=== Clean sheets ===
Rank	No.	Pos	Nat	Name	Bundesliga	DFB-Pokal	UEFA EL	Total
1	1	GK	(Denmark)	Jonas Lössl	5	0	1	6
2	33	GK	(Germany)	Jannik Huth	2	0	1	3
Totals					7	0	2	9

Last updated: 7 May 2017

=== Disciplinary record ===
No.	Pos	Nat	Player	Bundesliga			DFB-Pokal			UEFA EL			Total		
No.	Pos	Nat	Player	Yellow card	(yellow card) (yellow-red card)	Red card	Yellow card	(yellow card) (yellow-red card)	Red card	Yellow card	(yellow card) (yellow-red card)	Red card	Yellow card	(yellow card) (yellow-red card)	Red card
1	GK	(Denmark)	Jonas Lössl	0	0	0	0	0	0	1	0	0	1	0	0
2	DF	(Italy)	Giulio Donati	4	0	0	0	1	0	2	0	0	6	1	0
3	DF	(Nigeria)	Leon Balogun	3	0	0	0	0	0	1	0	0	4	0	0
5	MF	(Spain)	José Rodríguez	0	0	1	0	0	0	0	0	0	0	0	1
6	MF	(Germany)	Danny Latza	6	0	0	0	0	0	0	0	0	6	0	0
8	MF	(Germany)	Levin Öztunalı	1	0	0	0	0	0	2	0	0	3	0	0
9	FW	(Japan)	Yoshinori Muto	3	0	0	0	0	0	0	0	0	3	0	0
10	MF	(Turkey)	Yunus Mallı	0	0	0	0	0	0	1	0	0	1	0	0
10	FW	(Spain)	Bojan Krkić	1	0	0	0	0	0	0	0	0	1	0	0
15	FW	(Colombia)	Jhon Córdoba	8	0	1	0	0	0	0	0	0	8	0	1
16	DF	(Germany)	Stefan Bell	9	1	0	0	0	0	2	0	0	11	1	0
17	MF	(Spain)	Jairo Samperio	5	0	0	0	0	0	1	0	0	6	0	0
18	DF	(Germany)	Daniel Brosinski	6	0	0	0	0	0	2	0	0	8	0	0
20	MF	(Switzerland)	Fabian Frei	3	0	0	0	0	0	0	0	0	3	0	0
21	FW	(Austria)	Karim Onisiwo	4	0	0	0	0	0	1	0	0	5	0	0
22	DF	(Brazil)	André Ramalho	4	0	0	0	0	0	0	0	0	4	0	0
24	DF	(France)	Gaëtan Bussmann	1	0	1	0	0	0	1	0	0	2	0	1
25	DF	(Ivory Coast)	Jean-Philippe Gbamin	2	2	1	0	0	0	0	0	0	2	2	1
26	DF	(Germany)	Niko Bungert	1	0	0	1	0	0	1	0	0	3	0	0
32	FW	(Argentina)	Pablo de Blasis	5	0	0	0	0	0	0	0	0	5	0	0
42	DF	(Germany)	Alexander Hack	0	0	0	1	0	0	1	0	0	2	0	0
45	MF	(Germany)	Suat Serdar	1	0	0	0	0	0	0	0	0	1	0	0
Totals				63	3	4	2	1	0	16	0	0	81	4	4

Last updated: 20 May 2017
