= 2017–18 1. FSV Mainz 05 season =

Mainz 05
2017–18 season
- President: Harald Strutz
- Sporting director: Rouven Schröder
- Manager: Sandro Schwarz
- Stadium: Opel Arena
- Bundesliga: 14th
- DFB-Pokal: Quarter-finals
- Top goalscorer: League: Yoshinori Muto (8 goals); All: Yoshinori Muto (10 goals)
- Highest home attendance: 34,000
- Lowest home attendance: 10,441
- Average home league attendance: 28,766
- Biggest win: Mainz 3–0 Leipzig
- Biggest defeat: Bayern 4–0 Mainz
Home colours	Away colours	Third colours
- All statistics correct as of 21 May 2018.

The 2017–18 1. FSV Mainz 05 season is the 113th season in the football club's history and 9th consecutive and 12th overall season in the top flight of German football, the Bundesliga, having been promoted from the 2. Bundesliga in 2009. In addition to the domestic league, Mainz 05 also are participating in this season's edition of the domestic cup, the DFB-Pokal. This is the 7th season for Mainz in the Opel Arena, located in Mainz, Rhineland-Palatinate, Germany. The season covers a period from 1 July 2017 to 30 June 2018.

== Players ==
=== Squad information ===
As of 29 April 2018

Note: Flags indicate national team as defined under FIFA eligibility rules; some limited exceptions apply. Players may hold more than one non-FIFA nationality.

No.	Pos.	Nation	Player
1	GK	(Germany) GER	René Adler
2	DF	(Italy) ITA	Giulio Donati
3	DF	(Nigeria) NGA	Leon Balogun
4	DF	(France) FRA	Abdou Diallo
5	MF	(Netherlands) NED	Nigel de Jong
6	MF	(Germany) GER	Danny Latza
7	MF	(Sweden) SWE	Robin Quaison
8	MF	(Germany) GER	Levin Öztunalı
9	FW	(Japan) JPN	Yoshinori Mutō
10	MF	(Romania) ROU	Alexandru Maxim
11	FW	(Denmark) DEN	Emil Berggreen
13	DF	(Croatia) CRO	Marin Šverko
16	DF	(Germany) GER	Stefan Bell (captain)

No.	Pos.	Nation	Player
18	DF	(Germany) GER	Daniel Brosinski
20	FW	(Nigeria) NGA	Anthony Ujah
21	FW	(Austria) AUT	Karim Onisiwo
22	GK	(Germany) GER	Florian Müller
23	MF	(Germany) GER	Suat Serdar
25	MF	(Ivory Coast) CIV	Jean-Philippe Gbamin
26	DF	(Germany) GER	Niko Bungert
27	GK	(Germany) GER	Robin Zentner
32	FW	(Argentina) ARG	Pablo de Blasis
34	MF	(Germany) GER	Bote Baku
38	MF	(Germany) GER	Gerrit Holtmann
42	DF	(Germany) GER	Alexander Hack

== Competitions ==
Win Draw Loss

=== Overview ===
Competition	First match	Last match	Starting round	Final position	Record							
Competition	First match	Last match	Starting round	Final position	Pld	W	D	L	GF	GA	GD	Win %
Bundesliga	19 August 2017	12 May 2018	Matchday 1		34	9	9	16	38	52	−14	26.47
DFB-Pokal	12 August 2017	7 February 2018	First round	Quarter-finals	4	3	0	1	9	7	+2	75.00
Total					38	12	9	17	47	59	−12	31.58

Last updated: 21 May 2018
Source: Competitions

=== Bundesliga ===
==== League table ====
Pos	Team	Pld	W	D	L	GF	GA	GD	Pts	Qualification or relegation
12	FC Augsburg	34	10	11	13	43	46	−3	41	
13	Hannover 96	34	10	9	15	44	54	−10	39	
14	Mainz 05	34	9	9	16	38	52	−14	36	
15	SC Freiburg	34	8	12	14	32	56	−24	36	
16	VfL Wolfsburg (O)	34	6	15	13	36	48	−12	33	Qualification for the relegation play-offs

Source: DFB
Rules for classification: 1) Points; 2) Goal difference; 3) Goals scored; 4) Head-to-head results; 5) Head-to-head away goals scored; 6) Away goals scored; 7) Play-off.
(O) Play-off winners

==== Results summary ====
Overall								Home						Away					
Pld	W	D	L	GF	GA	GD	Pts	W	D	L	GF	GA	GD	W	D	L	GF	GA	GD
34	9	9	16	38	52	−14	36	7	3	7	22	21	+1	2	6	9	16	31	−15

Last updated: 21 May 2018.
Source: Bundesliga

==== Results by round ====
Round	1	2	3	4	5	6	7	8	9	10	11	12	13	14	15	16	17	18	19	20	21	22	23	24	25	26	27	28	29	30	31	32	33	34
Ground	H	A	H	A	H	H	A	H	A	H	A	H	A	H	A	H	A	A	H	A	H	A	A	H	A	H	A	H	A	H	A	H	A	H
Result	L	L	W	L	L	W	D	W	L	D	D	W	L	L	D	L	D	L	W	L	L	L	W	D	D	L	L	D	D	W	L	W	W	L
Position	11	16	13	15	15	14	13	10	12	13	13	12	13	14	14	15	15	15	15	15	16	16	16	16	16	16	16	16	16	15	15	14	14	14

Updated to match(es) played on 21 May 2018. Source: Bundesliga
A = Away; H = Home; W = Win; D = Draw; L = Loss

==== Matches ====
19 August 2017 1	Mainz 05	0–1	Hannover 96	Mainz
15:30 CEST (UTC+2)		Report	Harnik 73'	Stadium: Opel Arena; Attendance: 28,279; Referee: Felix Brych

26 August 2017 2	VfB Stuttgart	1–0	Mainz 05	Stuttgart
15:30 CEST (UTC+2)	Badstuber 53'	Report		Stadium: Mercedes-Benz Arena; Attendance: 53,100; Referee: Benjamin Brand

9 September 2017 3	Mainz 05	3–1	Bayer Leverkusen	Mainz
15:30 CEST (UTC+2)	Mutō 45'; Diallo 57'; Serdar 71'	Report	Kohr 22'	Stadium: Opel Arena; Attendance: 24,876; Referee: Markus Schmidt

16 September 2017 4	Bayern Munich	4–0	Mainz 05	Munich
15:30 CEST (UTC+2)	Müller 11'; Robben 23'; Lewandowski 50', 77'	Report		Stadium: Allianz Arena; Attendance: 75,000; Referee: Sascha Stegemann

20 September 2017 5	Mainz 05	2–3	1899 Hoffenheim	Mainz
20:30 CEST (UTC+2)	Latza 5'; Mutō 16'	Report	Amiri 23'; Wagner 45+1'; Uth 90+2'	Stadium: Opel Arena; Attendance: 23,477; Referee: Manuel Gräfe

23 September 2017 6	Mainz 05	1–0	Hertha BSC	Mainz
15:30 CEST (UTC+2)	de Blasis 54' (pen.)	Report		Stadium: Opel Arena; Attendance: 23,517; Referee: Tobias Stieler

30 September 2017 7	VfL Wolfsburg	1–1	Mainz 05	Wolfsburg
15:30 CEST (UTC+2)	Guilavogui 55'	Report	Mutō 74'	Stadium: Volkswagen Arena; Attendance: 24,352; Referee: Robert Hartmann

14 October 2017 8	Mainz 05	3–2	Hamburger SV	Mainz
15:30 CEST (UTC+2)	Maxim 2'; Bell 52'; Latza 58'	Report	Walace 9'; Salihović 90+2' (pen.)	Stadium: Opel Arena; Attendance: 30,371; Referee: Felix Brych

20 October 2017 9	Schalke 04	2–0	Mainz 05	Gelsenkirchen
20:30 CEST (UTC+2)	Goretzka 13'; Burgstaller 74'	Report		Stadium: Veltins-Arena; Attendance: 59,476; Referee: Bibiana Steinhaus

27 October 2017 10	Mainz 05	1–1	Eintracht Frankfurt	Mainz
20:30 CEST (UTC+2)	Serdar 71'	Report	Bell 37' (o.g.)	Stadium: Opel Arena; Attendance: 33,794; Referee: Sascha Stegemann

4 November 2017 11	Borussia Mönchengladbach	1–1	Mainz 05	Mönchengladbach
15:30 CET (UTC+1)	Vestergaard 67'	Report	Diallo 19'	Stadium: Borussia-Park; Attendance: 52,659; Referee: Sven Jablonski

18 November 2017 12	Mainz 05	1–0	1. FC Köln	Mainz
15:30 CET (UTC+1)	Brosinski 43' (pen.)	Report		Stadium: Opel Arena; Attendance: 30,473; Referee: Felix Brych

25 November 2017 13	SC Freiburg	2–1	Mainz 05	Freiburg
15:30 CET (UTC+1)	Petersen 51'; Kath 90+1'	Report	Berggreen 90+2'	Stadium: Schwarzwald-Stadion; Attendance: 24,000; Referee: Daniel Siebert

2 December 2017 14	Mainz 05	1–3	FC Augsburg	Mainz
15:30 CET (UTC+1)	Holtmann 85'	Report	Gregoritsch 22'; Finnbogason 43' (pen.), 86'	Stadium: Opel Arena; Attendance: 25,037; Referee: Frank Willenborg

9 December 2017 15	RB Leipzig	2–2	Mainz 05	Leipzig
15:30 CET (UTC+1)	Kampl 29'; Werner 45+3' (pen.)	Report	Quaison 39'; Berggreen 86'	Stadium: Red Bull Arena; Attendance: 32,817; Referee: Patrick Ittrich

12 December 2017 16	Mainz 05	0–2	Borussia Dortmund	Mainz
20:30 CET (UTC+1)		Report	Papastathopoulos 55'; Kagawa 89'	Stadium: Opel Arena; Attendance: 32,976; Referee: Benjamin Brand

16 December 2017 17	Werder Bremen	2–2	Mainz 05	Bremen
15:30 CET (UTC+1)	Bargfrede 2'; Belfodil 17'	Report	Quaison 70'; Frei 90+3'	Stadium: Weser-Stadion; Attendance: 39,000; Referee: Benjamin Cortus

13 January 2018 18	Hannover 96	3–2	Mainz 05	Hanover
15:30 CET (UTC+1)	Füllkrug 33', 38' (pen.), 75'	Report	Mutō 26'; Hack 31'	Stadium: HDI-Arena; Attendance: 34,500; Referee: Bastian Dankert

20 January 2018 19	Mainz 05	3–2	VfB Stuttgart	Mainz
15:30 CET (UTC+1)	Mutō 45+2', 54'; Holtmann 64'	Report	Badstuber 19'; Ginczek 90+1'	Stadium: Opel Arena; Attendance: 25,736; Referee: Harm Osmers

28 January 2018 20	Bayer Leverkusen	2–0	Mainz 05	Leverkusen
15:30 CET (UTC+1)	Bailey 48'; Wendell 68' (pen.)	Report		Stadium: BayArena; Attendance: 25,471; Referee: Frank Willenborg

3 February 2018 21	Mainz 05	0–2	Bayern Munich	Mainz
15:30 CET (UTC+1)		Report	Ribéry 33'; Rodríguez 44'	Stadium: Opel Arena; Attendance: 34,000; Referee: Sören Storks

10 February 2018 22	1899 Hoffenheim	4–2	Mainz 05	Sinsheim
15:30 CET (UTC+1)	Szalai 27', 74'; Kramarić 67', 88'	Report	Berggreen 28', 80'	Stadium: Wirsol Rhein-Neckar-Arena; Attendance: 24,105; Referee: Benjamin Cortus

16 February 2018 23	Hertha BSC	0–2	Mainz 05	Berlin
20:30 CET (UTC+1)		Report	Quaison 40', 65'	Stadium: Olympiastadion Berlin; Attendance: 30,908; Referee: Martin Petersen

23 February 2018 24	Mainz 05	1–1	VfL Wolfsburg	Mainz
20:30 CET (UTC+1)	Mutō 44'	Report	Brekalo 6'	Stadium: Opel Arena; Attendance: 25,173; Referee: Bastian Dankert

3 March 2018 25	Hamburger SV	0–0	Mainz 05	Hamburg
15:30 CET (UTC+1)		Report		Stadium: Volksparkstadion; Attendance: 46,739; Referee: Markus Schmidt

9 March 2018 26	Mainz 05	0–1	Schalke 04	Mainz
20:30 CET (UTC+1)		Report	Caligiuri 55'	Stadium: Opel Arena; Attendance: 30,655; Referee: Felix Brych

17 March 2018 27	Eintracht Frankfurt	3–0	Mainz 05	Frankfurt
15:30 CET (UTC+1)	Boateng 6'; Jović 23'; Rebić 41'	Report		Stadium: Commerzbank-Arena; Attendance: 49,500; Referee: Daniel Siebert

1 April 2018 28	Mainz 05	0–0	Borussia Mönchengladbach	Mainz
18:00 CEST (UTC+2)		Report		Stadium: Opel Arena; Attendance: 30,173; Referee: Manuel Gräfe

7 April 2018 29	1. FC Köln	1–1	Mainz 05	Cologne
15:30 CEST (UTC+2)	Hector 7'	Report	De Blasis 50'	Stadium: RheinEnergieStadion; Attendance: 50,000; Referee: Benjamin Cortus

16 April 2018 30	Mainz 05	2–0	SC Freiburg	Mainz
20:30 CEST (UTC+2)	de Blasis 45+7' (pen.), 78'	Report		Stadium: Opel Arena; Attendance: 26,407; Referee: Guido Winkmann

22 April 2018 31	FC Augsburg	2–0	Mainz 05	Augsburg
15:30 CEST (UTC+2)	Gregoritsch 29'; Finnbogason 90+2'	Report		Stadium: WWK Arena; Attendance: 29,110; Referee: Frank Willenborg

29 April 2018 32	Mainz 05	3–0	RB Leipzig	Mainz
15:30 CEST (UTC+2)	De Blasis 29' (pen.); Maxim 85'; Baku 90'	Report		Stadium: Opel Arena; Attendance: 30,083; Referee: Bastian Dankert

5 May 2018 33	Borussia Dortmund	1–2	Mainz 05	Dortmund
15:30 CEST (UTC+2)	Philipp 16'	Report	Baku 4'; Mutō 13'	Stadium: Signal Iduna Park; Attendance: 81,360; Referee: Daniel Siebert

12 May 2018 34	Mainz 05	1–2	Werder Bremen	Mainz
15:30 CEST (UTC+2)	Gbamin 12'	Report	Kainz 23'; Gebre Selassie 79'	Stadium: Opel Arena; Attendance: 34,000; Referee: Martin Petersen

=== DFB-Pokal ===
12 August 2017 First round	LSK Hansa	1–3	Mainz 05	Lüneburg
15:30 CEST (UTC+2)	Vobejda 31'	Report	Mutō 13', 60'; Brosinski 45' (pen.)	Stadium: Sportanlage Sülzwiesen; Attendance: 4,000; Referee: Sven Jablonski

24 October 2017 Second round	Mainz 05	3–2 (a.e.t.)	Holstein Kiel	Mainz
20:45 CEST (UTC+2)	Fischer 22', 67'; Brosinski 101'	Report	Schindler 54' (pen.); Drexler 75' (pen.)	Stadium: Opel Arena; Attendance: 10,441; Referee: Daniel Schlager

19 December 2017 Round of 16	Mainz 05	3–1	VfB Stuttgart	Mainz
18:30 CET (UTC+1)	Berggreen 62'; Diallo 71'; Serdar 90+3'	Report	Gentner 41'	Stadium: Opel Arena; Attendance: 22,143; Referee: Tobias Stieler

7 February 2018 Quarter-finals	Eintracht Frankfurt	3–0	Mainz 05	Frankfurt
18:30 CET (UTC+1)	Rebić 17'; Hack 53' (o.g.); Mascarell 62'	Report		Stadium: Commerzbank-Arena; Attendance: 48,200; Referee: Deniz Aytekin
