= 2018–19 1. FSV Mainz 05 season =

Mainz 05
2018–19 season
- President: Harald Strutz
- Sporting director: Rouven Schröder
- Manager: Sandro Schwarz
- Stadium: Opel Arena
- Bundesliga: 12th
- DFB-Pokal: Second round
- Top goalscorer: League: Jean-Philippe Mateta (14 goals); All: Jean-Philippe Mateta (14 goals)
- Highest home attendance: 33,305
- Lowest home attendance: 19,205
- Average home league attendance: 26,246
- Biggest win: Mainz 5–0 Freiburg
- Biggest defeat: Bayern 6–0 Mainz
Home colours	Away colours	Third colours

The 2018–19 1. FSV Mainz 05 season was the 114th season in the football club's history and 10th consecutive and 13th overall season in the top flight of German football, the Bundesliga, having been promoted from the 2. Bundesliga in 2009. In addition to the domestic league, Mainz 05 also participated in this season's edition of the domestic cup, the DFB-Pokal. This was the eighth season for Mainz in the Opel Arena, located in Mainz, Rhineland-Palatinate, Germany. The season covered a period from 1 July 2018 to 30 June 2019.

== Friendly matches ==
Win Draw Loss

8 January 2019 Friendly	Mainz 05	2–3	Standard Liège
16:00 CET (UTC+1)	Boetius 14'; Mateta 37'	Report	Emond 66' (pen.), 85' (pen.); Marin 82'

== Competitions ==
Win Draw Loss

=== Overview ===
Competition	First match	Last match	Starting round	Final position	Record							
Competition	First match	Last match	Starting round	Final position	Pld	W	D	L	GF	GA	GD	Win %
Bundesliga	26 August 2018	18 May 2019	Matchday 1		34	12	7	15	46	57	−11	35.29
DFB-Pokal	18 August 2018	30 October 2018	First round	Second round	2	1	0	1	5	4	+1	50.00
Total					36	13	7	16	51	61	−10	36.11

Last updated: 25 May 2019
Source: Competitions

=== Bundesliga ===
==== League table ====
Pos	Team	Pld	W	D	L	GF	GA	GD	Pts
10	Fortuna Düsseldorf	34	13	5	16	49	65	−16	44
11	Hertha BSC	34	11	10	13	49	57	−8	43
12	Mainz 05	34	12	7	15	46	57	−11	43
13	SC Freiburg	34	8	12	14	46	61	−15	36
14	Schalke 04	34	8	9	17	37	55	−18	33

Source: DFB
Rules for classification: 1) Points; 2) Goal difference; 3) Goals scored; 4) Head-to-head results; 5) Head-to-head away goals scored; 6) Away goals scored; 7) Play-off

==== Results summary ====
Overall								Home						Away					
Pld	W	D	L	GF	GA	GD	Pts	W	D	L	GF	GA	GD	W	D	L	GF	GA	GD
34	12	7	15	46	57	−11	43	8	5	4	31	22	+9	4	2	11	15	35	−20

Last updated: 25 May 2019.
Source: Bundesliga

==== Results by round ====
Round	1	2	3	4	5	6	7	8	9	10	11	12	13	14	15	16	17	18	19	20	21	22	23	24	25	26	27	28	29	30	31	32	33	34
Ground	H	A	H	A	H	A	H	A	H	H	A	H	A	H	A	H	A	A	H	A	H	A	H	A	H	A	A	H	A	H	A	H	A	H
Result	W	D	W	L	D	L	D	L	L	W	W	L	W	D	L	D	D	W	W	L	L	L	W	L	L	L	L	W	L	W	L	D	W	W
Position	7	8	6	7	7	9	8	12	13	12	9	10	10	10	10	11	12	11	10	11	11	11	11	12	13	13	13	12	12	12	12	12	12	12

Updated to match(es) played on 25 May 2019. Source: DFB
A = Away; H = Home; W = Win; D = Draw; L = Loss

==== Matches ====
26 August 2018 1	Mainz 05	1–0	VfB Stuttgart	Mainz
15:30 CEST (UTC+2)	Ujah 76'	Report		Stadium: Opel Arena; Attendance: 28,705; Referee: Daniel Siebert

1 September 2018 2	1. FC Nürnberg	1–1	Mainz 05	Nuremberg
15:30 CEST (UTC+2)	Ishak 48'	Report	Mateta 25'	Stadium: Max-Morlock-Stadion; Attendance: 37,781; Referee: Guido Winkmann

15 September 2018 3	Mainz 05	2–1	FC Augsburg	Mainz
15:30 CEST (UTC+2)	Ujah 87'; Maxim 90+3'	Report	Ji 82'	Stadium: Opel Arena; Attendance: 21,105; Referee: Martin Petersen

23 September 2018 4	Bayer Leverkusen	1–0	Mainz 05	Leverkusen
15:30 CEST (UTC+2)	Havertz 62'	Report		Stadium: BayArena; Attendance: 27,473; Referee: Marco Fritz

26 September 2018 5	Mainz 05	0–0	VfL Wolfsburg	Mainz
20:30 CEST (UTC+2)		Report		Stadium: Opel Arena; Attendance: 19,205; Referee: Tobias Stieler

29 September 2018 6	Schalke 04	1–0	Mainz 05	Gelsenkirchen
15:30 CEST (UTC+2)	Schöpf 11'	Report		Stadium: Veltins-Arena; Attendance: 61,810; Referee: Benjamin Cortus

6 October 2018 7	Mainz 05	0–0	Hertha BSC	Mainz
15:30 CEST (UTC+2)		Report		Stadium: Opel Arena; Attendance: 22,405; Referee: Daniel Schlager

21 October 2018 8	Borussia Mönchengladbach	4–0	Mainz 05	Mönchengladbach
18:00 CEST (UTC+2)	Hofmann 21', 53', 63'; Hazard 58'	Report		Stadium: Borussia-Park; Attendance: 51,123; Referee: Sören Storks

27 October 2018 9	Mainz 05	1–2	Bayern Munich	Mainz
15:30 CEST (UTC+2)	Boëtius 48'	Report	Goretzka 39'; Thiago 62'	Stadium: Opel Arena; Attendance: 33,305; Referee: Harm Osmers

4 November 2018 10	Mainz 05	2–1	Werder Bremen	Mainz
18:00 CET (UTC+1)	Mateta 25'; Gbamin 51'	Report	Pizarro 78'	Stadium: Opel Arena; Attendance: 25,105; Referee: Guido Winkmann

10 November 2018 11	SC Freiburg	1–3	Mainz 05	Freiburg
15:30 CET (UTC+1)	Sallai 72'	Report	Gbamin 6'; Mateta 18'; Onisiwo 75'	Stadium: Schwarzwald-Stadion; Attendance: 24,000; Referee: Sascha Stegemann

24 November 2018 12	Mainz 05	1–2	Borussia Dortmund	Mainz
15:30 CET (UTC+1)	Quaison 70'	Report	Alcácer 66'; Piszczek 76'	Stadium: Opel Arena; Attendance: 33,305; Referee: Deniz Aytekin

30 November 2018 13	Fortuna Düsseldorf	0–1	Mainz 05	Düsseldorf
20:30 CET (UTC+1)		Report	Mateta 67'	Stadium: Merkur Spiel-Arena; Attendance: 37,091; Referee: Manuel Gräfe

9 December 2018 14	Mainz 05	1–1	Hannover 96	Mainz
15:30 CET (UTC+1)	Brosinski 89' (pen.)	Report	Weydandt 12'	Stadium: Opel Arena; Attendance: 23,305; Referee: Robert Hartmann

16 December 2018 15	RB Leipzig	4–1	Mainz 05	Leipzig
15:30 CET (UTC+1)	Poulsen 14', 19'; Werner 74', 88'	Report	Onisiwo 38'	Stadium: Red Bull Arena; Attendance: 30,136; Referee: Martin Petersen

19 December 2018 16	Mainz 05	2–2	Eintracht Frankfurt	Mainz
20:30 CET (UTC+1)	Quaison 10', 36'	Report	Jović 31', 45+1'	Stadium: Opel Arena; Attendance: 30,805; Referee: Daniel Siebert

23 December 2018 17	1899 Hoffenheim	1–1	Mainz 05	Sinsheim
18:00 CET (UTC+1)	Demirbay 11'	Report	Mateta 16'	Stadium: Wirsol Rhein-Neckar-Arena; Attendance: 28,216; Referee: Sascha Stegemann

19 January 2019 18	VfB Stuttgart	2–3	Mainz 05	Stuttgart
15:30 CET (UTC+1)	González 83'; Kempf 85'	Report	Ascacíbar 22' (o.g.); Mateta 28'; Hack 72'	Stadium: Mercedes-Benz Arena; Attendance: 51,881; Referee: Tobias Stieler

26 January 2019 19	Mainz 05	2–1	1. FC Nürnberg	Mainz
15:30 CET (UTC+1)	Brosinski 12' (pen.); Quaison 73'	Report	Margreitter 43'	Stadium: Opel Arena; Attendance: 22,005; Referee: Bastian Dankert

3 February 2019 20	FC Augsburg	3–0	Mainz 05	Augsburg
15:30 CET (UTC+1)	Finnbogason 8' (pen.), 34' (pen.), 54'	Report		Stadium: WWK Arena; Attendance: 25,733; Referee: Sören Storks

8 February 2019 21	Mainz 05	1–5	Bayer Leverkusen	Mainz
20:30 CET (UTC+1)	Quaison 9'	Report	Wendell 5'; Havertz 19'; Brandt 30', 64'; Bellarabi 43'	Stadium: Opel Arena; Attendance: 21,905; Referee: Robert Schröder

16 February 2019 22	VfL Wolfsburg	3–0	Mainz 05	Wolfsburg
15:30 CET (UTC+1)	Arnold 4'; Weghorst 69' (pen.); Knoche 76'	Report		Stadium: Volkswagen Arena; Attendance: 20,334; Referee: Benjamin Cortus

23 February 2019 23	Mainz 05	3–0	Schalke 04	Mainz
15:30 CET (UTC+1)	Onisiwo 18', 84'; Mateta 73'	Report		Stadium: Opel Arena; Attendance: 26,005; Referee: Sven Jablonski

2 March 2019 24	Hertha BSC	2–1	Mainz 05	Berlin
15:30 CET (UTC+1)	Grujić 50'; Stark 60'	Report	Stark 46' (o.g.)	Stadium: Olympiastadion Berlin; Attendance: 33,981; Referee: Deniz Aytekin

9 March 2019 25	Mainz 05	0–1	Borussia Mönchengladbach	Mainz
18:30 CET (UTC+1)		Report	Elvedi 63'	Stadium: Opel Arena; Attendance: 30,405; Referee: Markus Schmidt

17 March 2019 26	Bayern Munich	6–0	Mainz 05	Munich
18:00 CET (UTC+1)	Lewandowski 3'; Rodríguez 33', 51', 55'; Coman 39'; Davies 70'	Report		Stadium: Allianz Arena; Attendance: 75,000; Referee: Frank Willenborg

30 March 2019 27	Werder Bremen	3–1	Mainz 05	Bremen
15:30 CET (UTC+1)	Rashica 3'; Kruse 36', 63'	Report	Quaison 52'	Stadium: Weser-Stadion; Attendance: 40,711; Referee: Marco Fritz

5 April 2019 28	Mainz 05	5–0	SC Freiburg	Mainz
20:30 CEST (UTC+2)	Boëtius 20'; Mateta 25', 33', 77'; Onisiwo 73'	Report		Stadium: Opel Arena; Attendance: 27,305; Referee: Sven Jablonski

13 April 2019 29	Borussia Dortmund	2–1	Mainz 05	Dortmund
18:30 CEST (UTC+2)	Sancho 17', 24'	Report	Quaison 83'	Stadium: Signal Iduna Park; Attendance: 81,365; Referee: Deniz Aytekin

20 April 2019 30	Mainz 05	3–1	Fortuna Düsseldorf	Mainz
15:30 CEST (UTC+2)	Mateta 1', 87'; Onisiwo 67'	Report	Lukebakio 19'	Stadium: Opel Arena; Attendance: 29,205; Referee: Markus Schmidt

27 April 2019 31	Hannover 96	1–0	Mainz 05	Hanover
15:30 CEST (UTC+2)	Weydandt 66'	Report		Stadium: HDI-Arena; Attendance: 30,400; Referee: Sören Storks

3 May 2019 32	Mainz 05	3–3	RB Leipzig	Mainz
20:30 CEST (UTC+2)	Onisiwo 43'; Niakhaté 67'; Mateta 83'	Report	Klostermann 20', 32'; Werner 49'	Stadium: Opel Arena; Attendance: 23,805; Referee: Bibiana Steinhaus

12 May 2019 33	Eintracht Frankfurt	0–2	Mainz 05	Frankfurt
18:00 CEST (UTC+2)		Report	Ujah 53', 57'	Stadium: Commerzbank-Arena; Attendance: 51,500; Referee: Harm Osmers
Note: The Eintracht Frankfurt v Mainz 05 match, originally scheduled for 11 May 2019, 15:30 CEST, was moved to the following day due to Eintracht Frankfurt's participation in the semi-finals of the UEFA Europa League.

18 May 2019 34	Mainz 05	4–2	1899 Hoffenheim	Mainz
15:30 CEST (UTC+2)	Brosinski 66' (pen.); Boëtius 83', 90'; Mateta 90+3'	Report	Belfodil 12'; Kramarić 34'	Stadium: Opel Arena; Attendance: 28,305; Referee: Deniz Aytekin

=== DFB-Pokal ===
18 August 2018 First round	Erzgebirge Aue	1–3	Mainz 05	Aue
18:30 CEST (UTC+2)	Testroet 83'	Report	Maxim 31', 65'; Quaison 59'	Stadium: Erzgebirgsstadion; Attendance: 7,600; Referee: Felix Zwayer

30 October 2018 Second round	FC Augsburg	3–2 (a.e.t.)	Mainz 05	Augsburg
20:45 CET (UTC+1)	Bell 40' (o.g.); Gregoritsch 86'; Caiuby 105'	Report	Mwene 19'; Quaison 45'	Stadium: WWK Arena; Attendance: 15,561; Referee: Manuel Gräfe

== Statistics ==
=== Appearances and goals ===
No.	Pos	Nat	Player	Total		Bundesliga		DFB-Pokal	
No.	Pos	Nat	Player	Apps	Goals	Apps	Goals	Apps	Goals
Goalkeepers
1	GK	(Germany) GER	René Adler	0	0	0	0	0	0
22	GK	(Germany) GER	Florian Müller	21	0	20	0	1	0
27	GK	(Germany) GER	Robin Zentner	10	0	9	0	1	0
33	GK	(Germany) GER	Jannik Huth	0	0	0	0	0	0
37	GK	(Germany) GER	Finn Dahmen	0	0	0	0	0	0
Defenders
2	DF	(Italy) ITA	Giulio Donati	6	0	4+2	0	0	0
3	DF	(Spain) ESP	Aarón Martín	28	0	27+1	0	0	0
16	DF	(Germany) GER	Stefan Bell	27	0	25	0	2	0
18	DF	(Germany) GER	Daniel Brosinski	25	2	23	2	2	0
19	DF	(France) FRA	Moussa Niakhaté	29	0	27+1	0	1	0
23	DF	(Austria) AUT	Phillipp Mwene	7	1	2+4	0	1	1
24	DF	(France) FRA	Gaëtan Bussmann	2	0	1	0	1	0
26	DF	(Germany) GER	Niko Bungert	5	0	2+2	0	0+1	0
31	DF	(Germany) GER	Ahmet Gürleyen	1	0	0+1	0	0	0
42	DF	(Germany) GER	Alexander Hack	11	1	7+3	1	1	0
Midfielders
5	MF	(Netherlands) NED	Jean-Paul Boëtius	26	2	20+5	2	0+1	0
6	MF	(Germany) GER	Danny Latza	20	0	18+2	0	0	0
7	MF	(Sweden) SWE	Robin Quaison	27	9	22+3	7	1+1	2
8	MF	(Germany) GER	Levin Öztunalı	14	0	11+2	0	0+1	0
10	MF	(Romania) ROU	Alexandru Maxim	20	3	2+16	1	2	2
14	MF	(Cameroon) CMR	Pierre Kunde	27	0	21+4	0	0+2	0
25	MF	(Ivory Coast) CIV	Jean-Philippe Gbamin	28	2	25+1	2	2	0
34	MF	(Germany) GER	Bote Baku	13	0	9+3	0	1	0
35	MF	(Luxembourg) LUX	Leandro Barreiro	1	0	1	0	0	0
38	MF	(Germany) GER	Gerrit Holtmann	5	0	1+3	0	1	0
Forwards
9	FW	(France) FRA	Jean-Philippe Mateta	31	10	25+4	10	1+1	0
11	FW	(Denmark) DEN	Emil Berggreen	0	0	0	0	0	0
20	FW	(Nigeria) NGA	Anthony Ujah	20	2	4+15	2	1	0
21	FW	(Austria) AUT	Karim Onisiwo	23	5	8+14	5	1	0
28	FW	(Ghana) GHA	Abass Issah	1	0	0+1	0	0	0
29	FW	(Germany) GER	Jonathan Burkardt	4	0	4	0	0	0
Players transferred out during the season
32	MF	(Argentina) ARG	Pablo de Blasis	2	0	1	0	1	0

Last updated: 13 April 2019
Source: Competitions
