= Levin Öztunalı =

German footballer

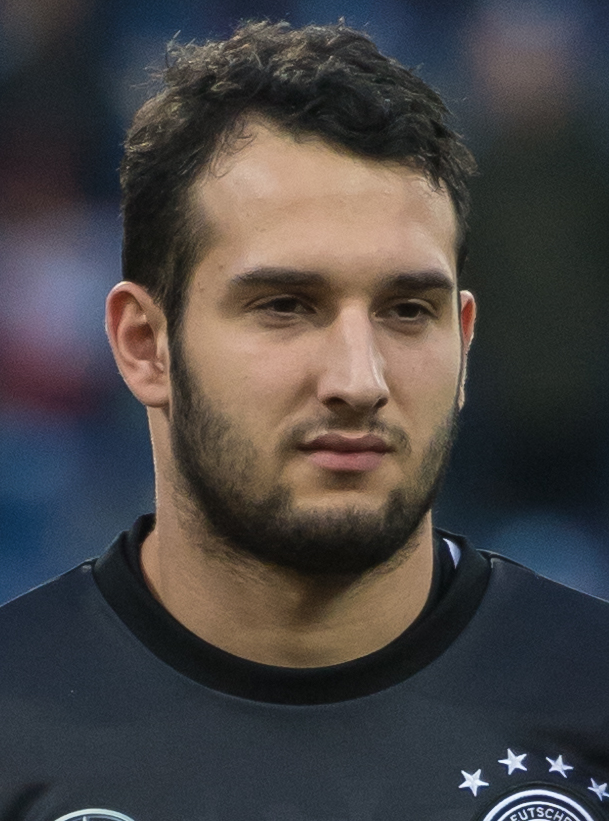
- Öztunalı representing Germany U21 in 2016

Personal information
- Full name: Levin Mete Öztunalı
- Date of birth: 15 March 1996 (age 30)
- Place of birth: Hamburg, Germany
- Height: 1.84 m (6 ft 0 in)
- Position: Midfielder

Youth career
- TuRa Harksheide
- 2004–2006: Eintracht Norderstedt
- 2006–2013: Hamburger SV

Senior career*
Years	Team	Apps	(Gls)
2013–2014	Bayer Leverkusen II	13	(1)
2013–2016	Bayer Leverkusen	15	(0)
2015–2016	→ Werder Bremen (loan)	41	(2)
2016–2021	Mainz 05	114	(9)
2021–2023	Union Berlin	20	(0)
2023–2025	Hamburger SV	21	(0)
2025–2026	Hamburger SV II	17	(0)

International career
2010–2011	Germany U15	4	(1)
2011–2012	Germany U16	5	(0)
2012–2013	Germany U17	14	(0)
2013–2014	Germany U19	11	(3)
2014–2015	Germany U20	11	(1)
2015–2019	Germany U21	30	(7)
Medal record
Representing Germany
UEFA European Under-21 Championship
Winner	2017 Poland
UEFA European Under-19 Championship
Winner	2014 Hungary
- * Club domestic league appearances and goals as of 20 June 2026

Levin Mete Öztunalı (born 15 March 1996) is a German professional footballer who plays as a midfielder.

Following seven years in the academy of Hamburger SV, Öztunalı made his senior debut with Bayer Leverkusen in 2013. He made 15 league appearances for the club before joining Werder Bremen on a season-and-a-half loan deal two years later. Following the expiration of the loan in 2016, Öztunalı joined Mainz, where he spent 5 years before joining Union Berlin in 2021. After two years there, he returned to Hamburg in 2023.

He has also represented Germany at various youth levels and was part of the squads which won the UEFA European Under-19 Championship in 2014 and the UEFA European Under-21 Championship in 2017. He gained 30 caps and scored 7 goals until 2019.

== Club career ==
=== Bayer Leverkusen ===
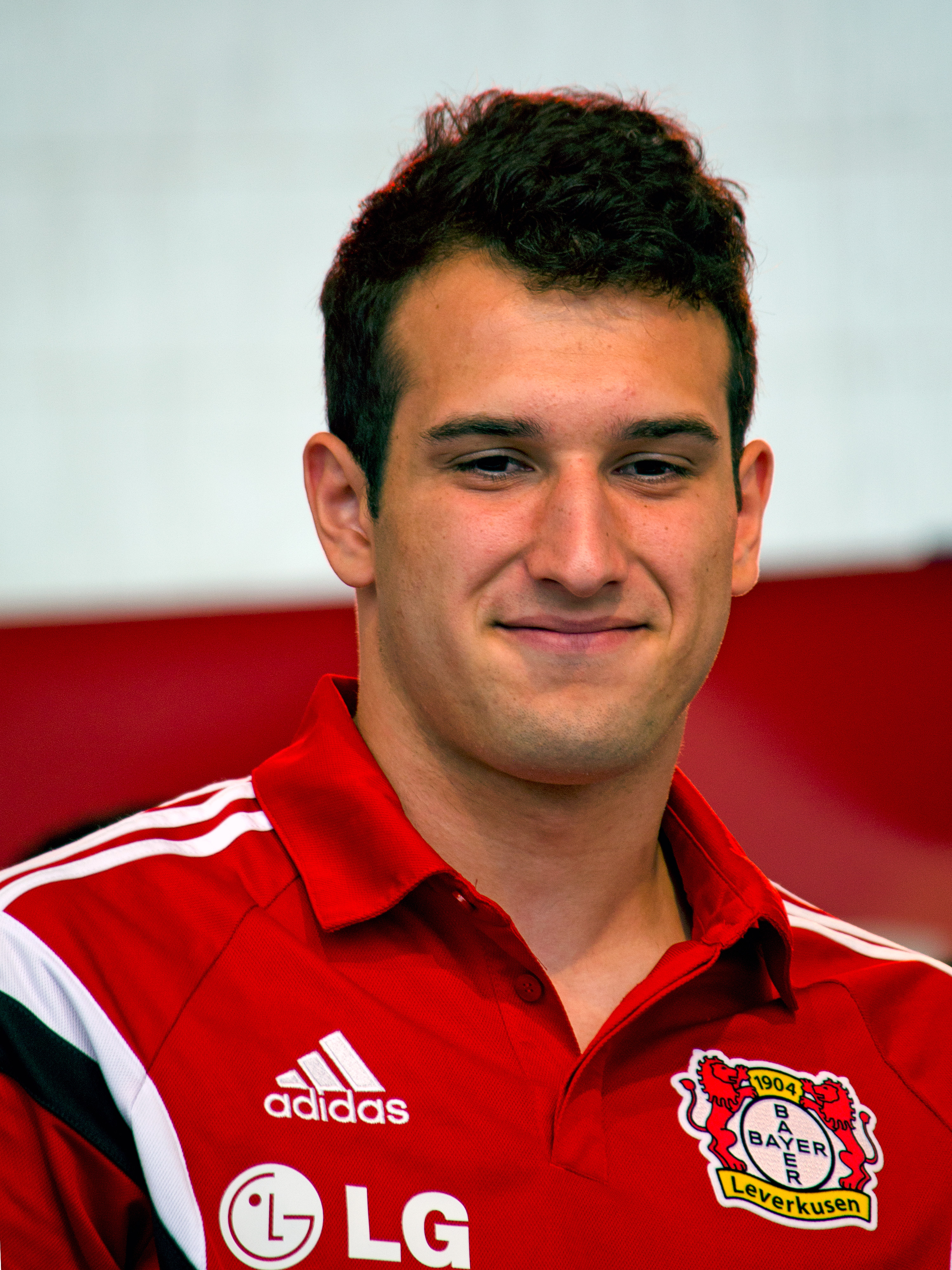
Öztunalı with Leverkusen in 2014

On 2 February 2013, Bayer Leverkusen announced the signing of Öztunalı from Bundesliga rivals Hamburg on a five-year deal, with the transfer to be completed at the end of the season. He made his debut on 10 August, coming on as a late substitute for Gonzalo Castro in a 3-1 win over Freiburg. At 17 years and 146 days old, Öztunalı became the youngest player to ever play for Leverkusen in the Bundesliga and the 11th youngest player in the history of the competition. On 26 August 2014, Öztunalı was voted the second-best u-18 player in Germany behind teammate Julian Brandt, and in doing so, he was awarded the silver Fritz Walter Medal.

==== Loan spell at Werder Bremen ====
On 21 December 2014, Öztunalı joined Werder Bremen on an 18-month loan deal, running until the end of the 2015–16 campaign. Upon his arrival in Bremen, Chief Executive Thomas Eichin described Öztunalı as "one of the most sought-after talents in the Bundesliga." His first goal for Die Grün-Weißen came on the final day of the 2014–15 season when he netted in a 3–2 loss to Borussia Dortmund. Öztunalı had to wait until May of the following season to score his next goal for the club, netting one and assisting another in a 6–2 drubbing of Stuttgart. The result saw Bremen climb out of the relegation zone at the expense of their opponents. He made his final appearance for the club on 14 May, playing for 77 minutes as Bremen beat Eintracht Frankfurt 1–0 to avoid relegation.

On 2 June 2016, amid speculation that Öztunalı would remain at Werder Bremen, Bayer Leverkusen director of football Rudi Völler confirmed that he would be returning to Leverkusen and would be part of the squad for the following season. Öztunalı amassed a total of 46 appearances across all competitions during his 18-month spell with Werder Bremen.

=== Mainz 05 ===
On 25 August 2016, Leverkusen's Bundesliga rivals Mainz 05 announced the signing of Öztunalı on a five-year deal. He made his debut against Borussia Dortmund on 27 August, coming on as a second half substitute for Suat Serdar, and scored his first goal for the club in the following match-week in a 4–4 draw with Hoffenheim. He scored his first-ever European goal on 29 September, netting the winner in a 3–2 UEFA Europa League victory over Azerbaijani side Qabala. He ultimately made 36 appearances in the season across all competitions, including 23 starts and five goals in the league as Mainz narrowly avoided the relegation play-offs.

=== Hamburger SV ===
On 27 June 2023, Öztunalı joined Hamburger SV on a free transfer, on a contract until 2026.

== International career ==
He has represented various German youth teams, however, as he is not capped at senior international level, he is eligible to represent for Germany or Turkey.

=== German national youth teams ===
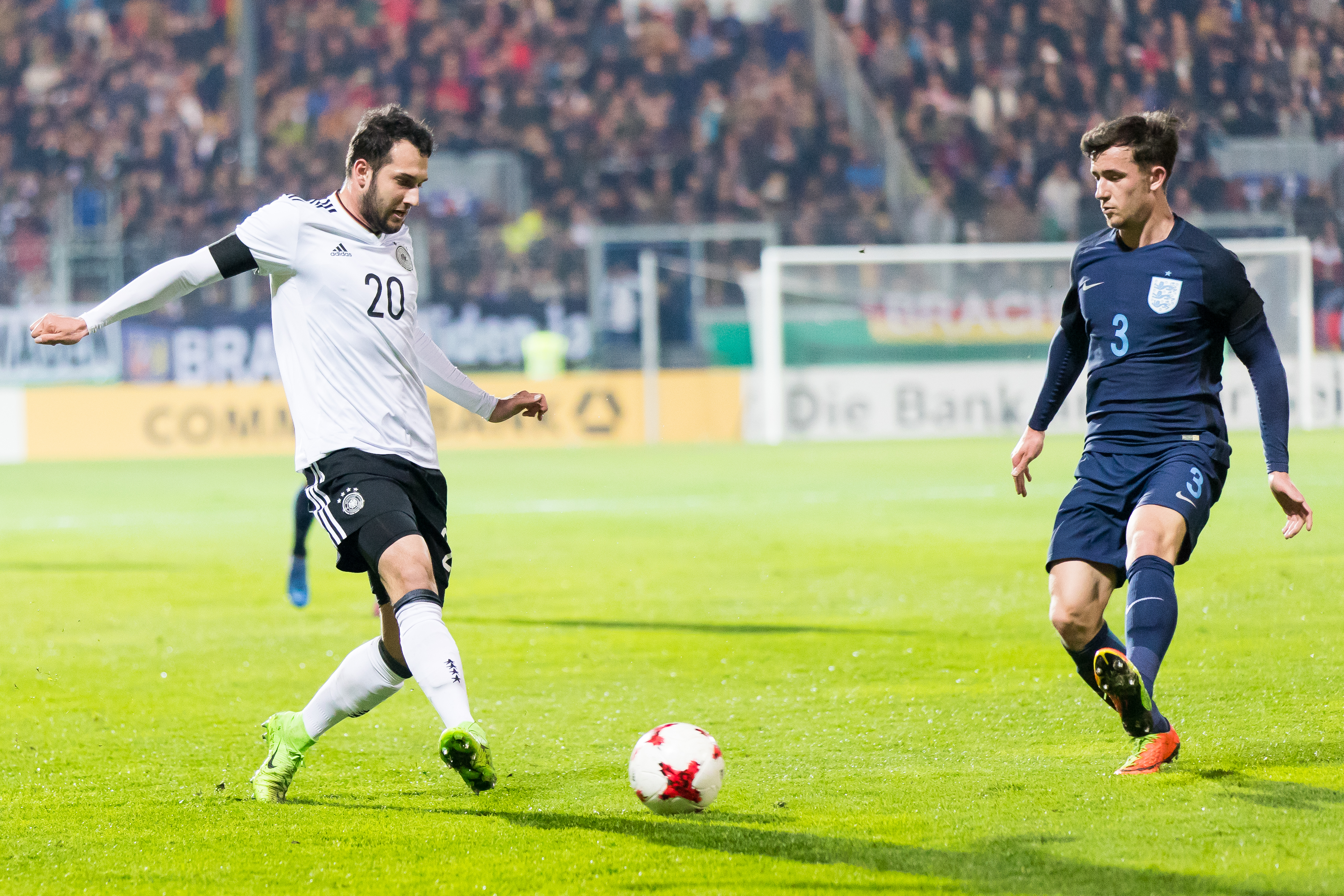
Öztunalı (left) in action for Germany against England U21 in 2017

Öztunalı has represented Germany at various youth levels since his debut for the U15 side in 2010. In 2014, he was part of the squad which took part in the UEFA European Under-19 Championship in Hungary. He scored the third goal in a semi-final victory over Austria and started in the final as Germany claimed the title with a 1–0 win over Portugal. His form throughout the competition saw him named in the Team of the Tournament alongside top scorer Davie Selke and four other countrymen.

In 2017, Öztunalı was one of 23 players selected in Stefan Kuntz's squad for the 2017 UEFA European Under-21 Championship in Poland. Germany were ultimately crowned champions, beating Spain 1–0 in the final to claim the title.

== Personal life ==
Öztunalı is the grandson of former German international footballer and World Cup finalist Uwe Seeler. His father is Turkish and previously served as a scout for Hamburger SV.

== Career statistics ==
As of 23 August 2024

Appearances and goals by club, season and competition
Club	Season	League			Cup (Note: Includes DFB Pokal matches)		Continental (Note: Includes UEFA Champions League, UEFA Europa League and UEFA Europa Conference League matches.)		Total	
Club	Season	League	Apps	Goals	Apps	Goals	Apps	Goals	Apps	Goals
Bayer Leverkusen II	2013–14	Regionalliga	13	1	0	0	0	0	13	1
Bayer Leverkusen	2013–14	Bundesliga	9	0	0	0	0	0	9	0
Bayer Leverkusen	2014–15	Bundesliga	6	0	1	0	1	0	8	0
Bayer Leverkusen	Total		15	0	1	0	1	0	17	0
Werder Bremen (loan)	2014–15	Bundesliga	16	1	1	0	0	0	17	1
Werder Bremen (loan)	2015–16	Bundesliga	25	1	4	0	0	0	29	1
Werder Bremen (loan)	Total		41	2	5	0	0	0	46	2
Mainz 05	2016–17	Bundesliga	30	4	1	0	5	1	36	5
Mainz 05	2017–18	Bundesliga	25	0	1	0	0	0	26	0
Mainz 05	2018–19	Bundesliga	15	0	1	0	0	0	16	0
Mainz 05	2019–20	Bundesliga	27	4	0	0	0	0	31	4
Mainz 05	2020–21	Bundesliga	17	1	1	0	0	0	18	1
Mainz 05	Total		114	9	8	0	5	1	127	10
Union Berlin	2021–22	Bundesliga	18	0	1	0	5 (Note: Includes one appearance in UEFA Europa Conference League qualifying phase.)	0	24	0
Union Berlin	2022–23	Bundesliga	2	0	0	0	0	0	2	0
Union Berlin	Total		20	0	1	0	5	0	26	0
Hamburger SV	2023–24	2. Bundesliga	19	0	3	0	0	0	22	0
Hamburger SV	2024–25	2. Bundesliga	2	0	0	0	0	0	2	0
Hamburger SV	2025–26	Bundesliga	0	0	0	0	0	0	0	0
Hamburger SV	Total		21	0	3	0	0	0	24	0
Career total			224	12	18	0	11	1	253	13

== Honours ==
Germany U19

- UEFA European Under-19 Championship: 2014

Germany U21

- UEFA European Under-21 Championship: 2017

Individual

- UEFA European Under-19 Championship Team of the Tournament: 2014
- Fritz Walter Medal U18 Silver: 2014
