= Danny Latza =

German footballer (born 1989)

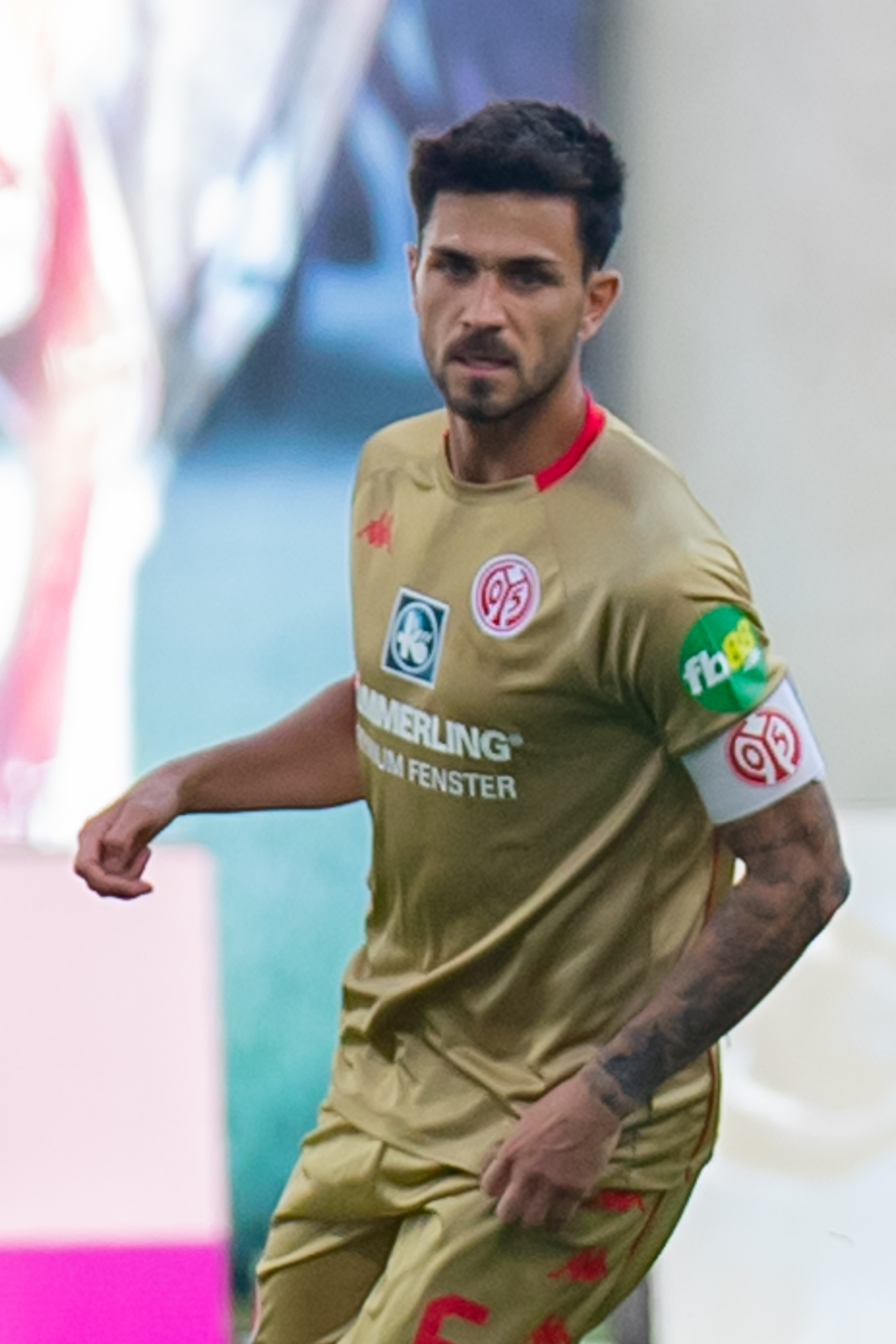
- Latza with Mainz 05 in 2020

Personal information
- Date of birth: 7 December 1989 (age 36)
- Place of birth: Gelsenkirchen, West Germany
- Height: 1.79 m (5 ft 10 in)
- Position: Midfielder

Team information
- Current team: Fortuna Düsseldorf II
- Number: 6

Youth career
- 1995–1998: DJK Arminia Ückendorf
- 1998–2007: Schalke 04

Senior career*
Years	Team	Apps	(Gls)
2007–2011	Schalke 04 II	65	(9)
2009	Schalke 04	3	(0)
2011–2013	Darmstadt 98	73	(10)
2013–2015	VfL Bochum	64	(4)
2015–2021	Mainz 05	153	(6)
2021–2024	Schalke 04	46	(3)
2024–	Fortuna Düsseldorf II	25	(1)
2025	Fortuna Düsseldorf	1	(0)

International career
2004–2005	Germany U16	6	(0)
2005–2006	Germany U17	9	(0)
2006–2007	Germany U18	4	(0)
2007–2008	Germany U19	15	(0)
2008–2009	Germany U20	8	(3)
- * Club domestic league appearances and goals as of 24 June 2026

Danny Latza (born 7 December 1989) is a German footballer who plays as a midfielder for Regionalliga club Fortuna Düsseldorf II.

== Career ==
Latza began his footballing career in 1995, at the age of five, as a youth player with his local team, DJK Arminia Ückendorf. He stayed as a player for three years before moving to Schalke 04 where he started his professional career. Latza's first professional appearance was in the Bundesliga on 14 February 2009 against VfL Bochum, when he came on as a substitute for Levan Kobiashvili.

Latza joined the SV Darmstadt 98 for the 2011–12 3. Liga season. On 22 May 2013, it was announced that the MSV Duisburg had signed Latza. However this contract was valid only for the 2. Bundesliga and was voided when the Deutsche Fußball Liga denied Duisburg the license to play in the 2013–14 2. Bundesliga season. After a brief trial spell, Latza signed with the 2. Bundesliga side Bochum.

On 17 December 2016, Latza scored his first Bundesliga goals, a hat-trick for 1. FSV Mainz 05, in a 3–1 home victory against Hamburger SV.

On 17 March 2021, Latza agreed to rejoin Schalke 04 on a free transfer for the 2021–22 season, signing a two-year contract which will be extended by an extra year should Schalke achieve promotion in that time. He was promptly appointed the team's captain under the head coach Dimitrios Grammozis.

On 12 November 2024, Latza joined Fortuna Düsseldorf II.

== Career statistics ==
As of 5 May 2025

Appearances and goals by club, season and competition
Club	Season	League			Cup		Total	
Club	Season	Division	Apps	Goals	Apps	Goals	Apps	Goals
Schalke 04 II	2006–07	Oberliga Westfalen	2	0	—		2	0
Schalke 04 II	2007–08	Oberliga Westfalen	1	0	—		1	0
Schalke 04 II	2008–09	Regionalliga West	23	5	—		23	5
Schalke 04 II	2009–10	Regionalliga West	19	2	—		19	2
Schalke 04 II	2010–11	Regionalliga West	20	2	—		20	2
Schalke 04 II	Total		65	9	—		65	9
Schalke 04	2008–09	Bundesliga	3	0	0	0	3	0
Darmstadt 98	2011–12	3. Liga	36	6	—		36	6
Darmstadt 98	2012–13	3. Liga	37	4	—		37	4
Darmstadt 98	Total		73	10	—		73	10
VfL Bochum	2013–14	2. Bundesliga	34	3	2	1	36	4
VfL Bochum	2014–15	2. Bundesliga	30	1	2	0	32	1
VfL Bochum	Total		64	4	4	1	68	5
Mainz 05	2015–16	Bundesliga	27	0	2	0	29	0
Mainz 05	2016–17	Bundesliga	21	4	0	0	21	4
Mainz 05	2017–18	Bundesliga	29	2	4	0	33	2
Mainz 05	2018–19	Bundesliga	24	0	0	0	24	0
Mainz 05	2019–20	Bundesliga	23	0	1	0	24	0
Mainz 05	2020–21	Bundesliga	29	0	2	1	31	1
Mainz 05	Total		153	6	9	1	162	7
Schalke 04	2021–22	2. Bundesliga	15	2	1	0	16	2
Schalke 04	2022–23	Bundesliga	20	0	1	0	21	0
Schalke 04	2023–24	2. Bundesliga	11	1	2	1	13	2
Schalke 04	Total		46	3	4	1	50	4
Fortuna Düsseldorf II	2024–25	Regionalliga West	14	1	—		14	1
Fortuna Düsseldorf	2024–25	2. Bundesliga	1	0	—		1	0
Career totals			419	33	17	3	436	36

== Honours ==
Schalke 04

- 2. Bundesliga: 2021–22
