= Stefan Bell =

German footballer

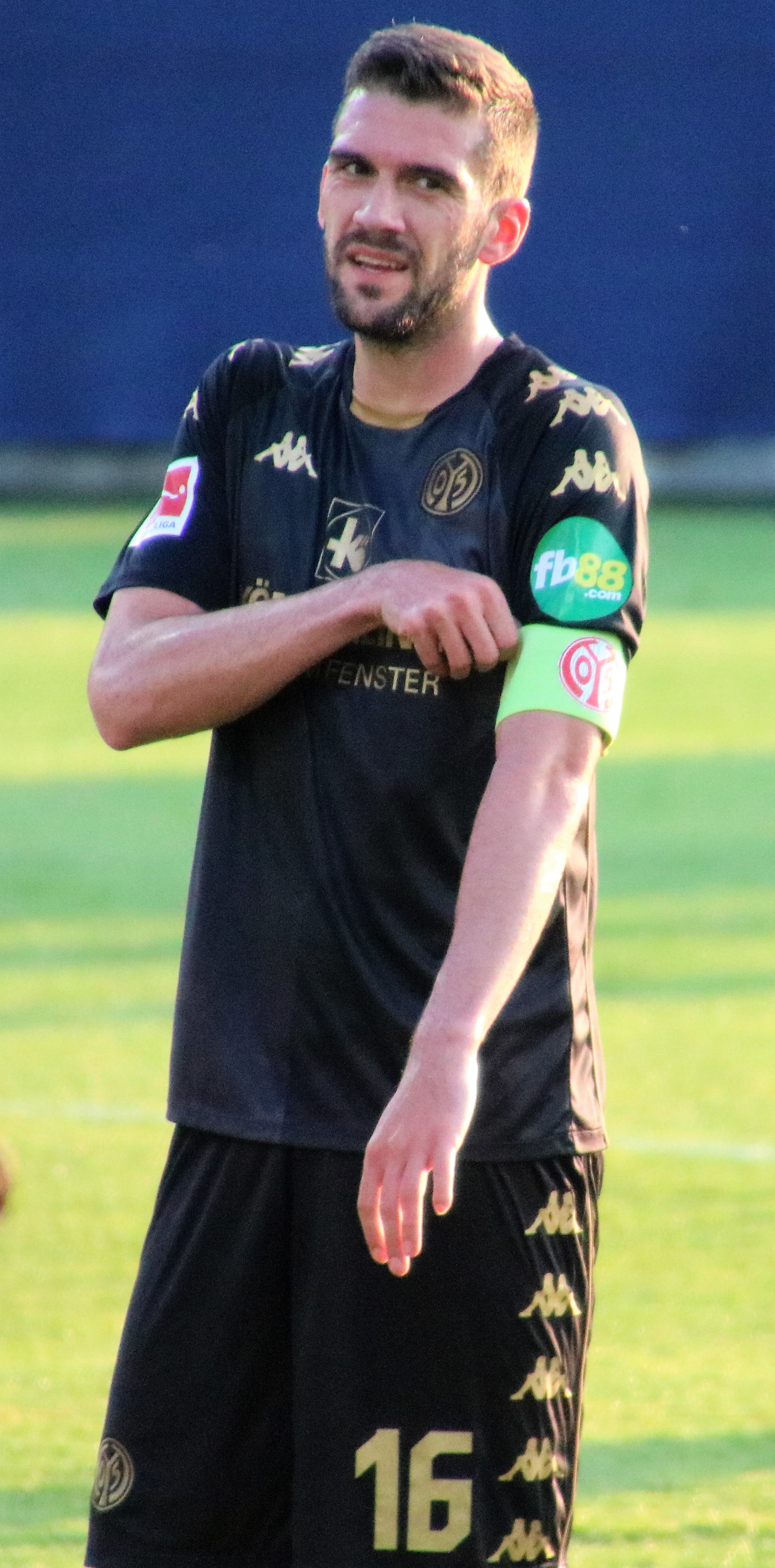
- Bell with 1. FSV Mainz 05 in 2021

Personal information
- Full name: Stefan Bell
- Date of birth: 24 August 1991 (age 35)
- Place of birth: Andernach, Germany
- Height: 1.92 m (6 ft 4 in)
- Positions: Centre back; right-back

Team information
- Current team: Mainz 05
- Number: 16

Youth career
- 1995–2006: JSG Wehr/Rieden/Volkesfeld
- 2006–2007: TuS Mayen
- 2007–2010: Mainz 05

Senior career*
Years	Team	Apps	(Gls)
2010–2020	Mainz 05 II	29	(4)
2010–	Mainz 05	302	(15)
2010–2011	→ 1860 Munich (loan)	24	(2)
2011–2012	→ Eintracht Frankfurt (loan)	2	(0)
2011–2012	→ Eintracht Frankfurt II (loan)	3	(0)

International career
2010	Germany U19	7	(0)
2011	Germany U20	1	(0)
2010–2011	Germany U21	5	(1)
- * Club domestic league appearances and goals as of 13 February 2026

Stefan Bell (German pronunciation: [ˈʃtɛfan ˈbɛl]; born 24 August 1991) is a German footballer who plays as a centre back or right-back for Bundesliga club Mainz 05.

== Career ==
In his early years, Bell played in the Jugendspielgemeinschaft Wehr/Rieden/Volkesfeld and afterwards he switched to the TuS Mayen. In 2007, he started playing in the youth team of 1. FSV Mainz 05. He started his professional career on 29 August 2010 with 1. FSV Mainz 05 where he is currently playing.

== Career statistics ==
As of match played 13 February 2026

Appearances and goals by club, season and competition
Club	Season	League			DFB-Pokal		Europe		Total	
Club	Season	Division	Apps	Goals	Apps	Goals	Apps	Goals	Apps	Goals
Mainz 05 II	2009–10	Regionalliga West	3	0	—		—		3	0
Mainz 05 II	2010–11	Regionalliga West	1	0	—		—		1	0
Mainz 05 II	2011–12	Regionalliga West	2	0	—		—		2	0
Mainz 05 II	2012–13	Regionalliga Südwest	20	4	—		—		20	4
Mainz 05 II	2013–14	Regionalliga Südwest	2	0	—		—		2	0
Mainz 05 II	2020–21	Regionalliga Südwest	1	0	—		—		1	0
Mainz 05 II	Total		29	4	—		—		29	4
Mainz	2009–10	Bundesliga	0	0	0	0	—		0	0
Mainz	2010–11	Bundesliga	0	0	0	0	—		0	0
Mainz	2011–12	Bundesliga	0	0	0	0	0	0	0	0
Mainz	2012–13	Bundesliga	8	0	0	0	—		8	0
Mainz	2013–14	Bundesliga	27	0	1	0	—		28	0
Mainz	2014–15	Bundesliga	31	3	1	0	2 (Note: Appearances in UEFA Europa League)	0	34	3
Mainz	2015–16	Bundesliga	30	1	2	0	—		32	1
Mainz	2016–17	Bundesliga	31	5	1	0	6	0	38	5
Mainz	2017–18	Bundesliga	25	1	3	0	—		28	1
Mainz	2018–19	Bundesliga	25	0	2	0	—		27	0
Mainz	2019–20	Bundesliga	0	0	1	0	—		1	0
Mainz	2020–21	Bundesliga	16	1	0	0	—		16	1
Mainz	2021–22	Bundesliga	33	2	3	0	—		36	2
Mainz	2022–23	Bundesliga	30	0	1	0	—		31	0
Mainz	2023–24	Bundesliga	10	0	1	0	—		11	0
Mainz	2024–25	Bundesliga	18	0	2	0	—		20	0
Mainz	2025–26	Bundesliga	18	2	1	0	4 (Note: Appearances in UEFA Conference League)	1	23	3
Mainz	Total		302	15	19	0	12	1	333	16
1860 Munich (loan)	2010–11	2. Bundesliga	24	2	1	0	—		25	2
Eintracht Frankfurt (loan)	2010–11	2. Bundesliga	2	0	0	0	—		2	0
Eintracht Frankfurt II (loan)	2011–12	Regionalliga Südwest	3	0	—		—		3	0
Career total			360	21	20	0	12	1	392	22

== Honours ==
Individual

- Fritz Walter Medal U19 silver: 2010
