= Florian Müller (footballer, born 1997) =

German association football player

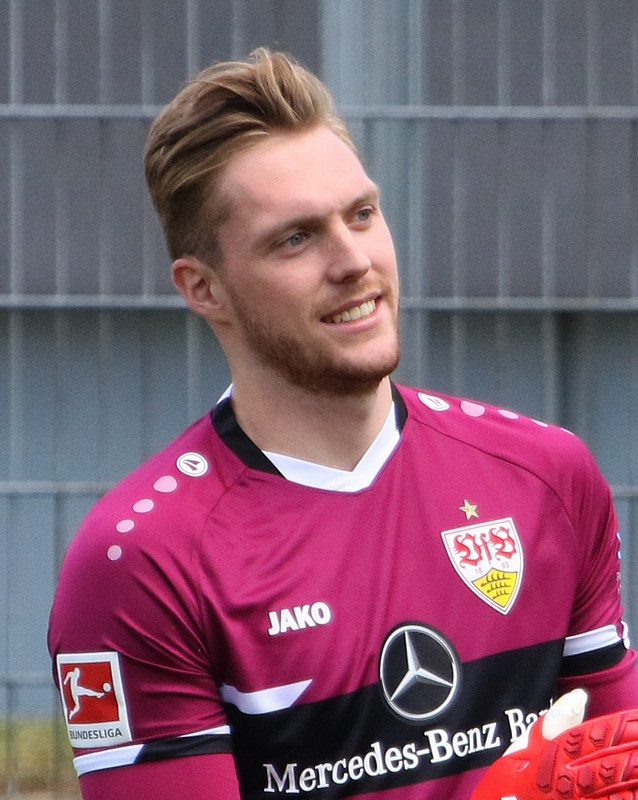
- Müller with VfB Stuttgart in 2021

Personal information
- Full name: Florian Lorenz Müller
- Date of birth: 13 November 1997 (age 29)
- Place of birth: Saarlouis, Germany
- Height: 1.90 m (6 ft 3 in)
- Position: Goalkeeper

Team information
- Current team: SC Freiburg
- Number: 21

Youth career
- 2001–2010: FV Lebach
- 2010–2013: 1. FC Saarbrücken
- 2013–2016: Mainz 05

Senior career*
Years	Team	Apps	(Gls)
2016–2020	Mainz 05 II	29	(0)
2016–2021	Mainz 05	42	(0)
2020–2021	→ SC Freiburg (loan)	31	(0)
2021–2023	VfB Stuttgart	49	(0)
2023–	SC Freiburg	9	(0)

International career
2015–2016	Germany U19	3	(0)
2016	Germany U20	4	(0)
2019	Germany U21	2	(0)
2021	Germany Olympic	3	(0)
Medal record
UEFA European Under-21 Championship
Runner-up	2019
- * Club domestic league appearances and goals as of 4 May 2025

Florian Lorenz Müller (German pronunciation: [ˈfloːʁi̯aːn ˈmʏlɐ]; born 13 November 1997) is a German professional footballer who plays as a goalkeeper for Bundesliga club SC Freiburg.

== Club career ==
Müller playing football with FV Lebach until he joined 1. FC Saarbrücken. He played at Saarbrücken until he joined in the youth academy of Mainz 05 in 2013. In Mainz he played for the U-17 and U-19 teams, and on 1 July 2016 he signed a professional contract for the second team, playing in the 3. Liga.

In the 3. Liga, Müller made his competitive debut during the 2015–16 season when he played in the 5–1 defeat to Chemnitzer FC on matchday 32, taking the place of goalkeeper Jannik Huth.

For the 2016–17 season, Müller was included in Mainz's first team squad, playing in the Bundesliga.

On 15 September 2020, Müller joined SC Freiburg on a season-long loan deal. As a result, Müller initially became the first-choice goalkeeper ahead of Benjamin Uphoff and Mark Flekken, following Alexander Schwolow's departure to Hertha BSC.

On 16 June 2021, Müller signed a four-year deal with VfB Stuttgart.

== International career ==
In October 2015, Müller was called up by the coach of the Germany national under-19 team, Marcus Sorg. He made his debut on 9 October 2015 during the 1–0 victory in the friendly match against the Mexico national under-19 football team, after coming on at the start of the second half for Timo Königsmann. He also made additional appearances in friendlies against the under-19 teams of Serbia on 15 November 2015 and South Korea on 29 March 2016, both ending in 1–0 wins.

== Career statistics ==
As of match played 28 October 2026

Appearances and goals by club, season and competition
Club	Season	League			Cup		Europe		Other		Total	
Club	Season	Division	Apps	Goals	Apps	Goals	Apps	Goals	Apps	Goals	Apps	Goals
Mainz 05 II	2015–16	3. Liga	2	0	—		—		—		2	0
Mainz 05 II	2016–17	3. Liga	18	0	—		—		—		18	0
Mainz 05 II	2017–18	Regionalliga Südwest	8	0	—		—		—		8	0
Mainz 05 II	2019–20	Regionalliga Südwest	1	0	—		—		—		1	0
Mainz 05 II	Total		29	0	—		—		—		29	0
Mainz 05	2016–17	Bundesliga	0	0	0	0	0	0	—		0	0
Mainz 05	2017–18	Bundesliga	5	0	0	0	—		—		5	0
Mainz 05	2018–19	Bundesliga	24	0	1	0	—		—		25	0
Mainz 05	2019–20	Bundesliga	13	0	1	0	—		—		14	0
Mainz 05	2020–21	Bundesliga	0	0	0	0	—		—		0	0
Mainz 05	Total		42	0	2	0	—		—		44	0
SC Freiburg (loan)	2020–21	Bundesliga	31	0	0	0	—		—		31	0
VfB Stuttgart	2021–22	Bundesliga	30	0	0	0	—		—		30	0
VfB Stuttgart	2022–23	Bundesliga	19	0	1	0	—		2 (Note: Appearances in relegation play-offs)	0	22	0
VfB Stuttgart	Total		49	0	1	0	—		2	0	52	0
SC Freiburg	2023–24	Bundesliga	0	0	1	0	0	0	—		1	0
SC Freiburg	2024–25	Bundesliga	9	0	3	0	—		—		12	0
SC Freiburg	2025–26	Bundesliga	0	0	4	0	—		—		4	0
SC Freiburg	2026–27	Bundesliga	0	0	1	0	0	0	—		1	0
SC Freiburg	Total		9	0	9	0	—		—		18	0
Career total			160	0	12	0	0	0	2	0	174	0

== Honours ==
SC Freiburg

- UEFA Europa League runner-up: 2025–26
