= Ridle Baku =

German footballer (born 1998)

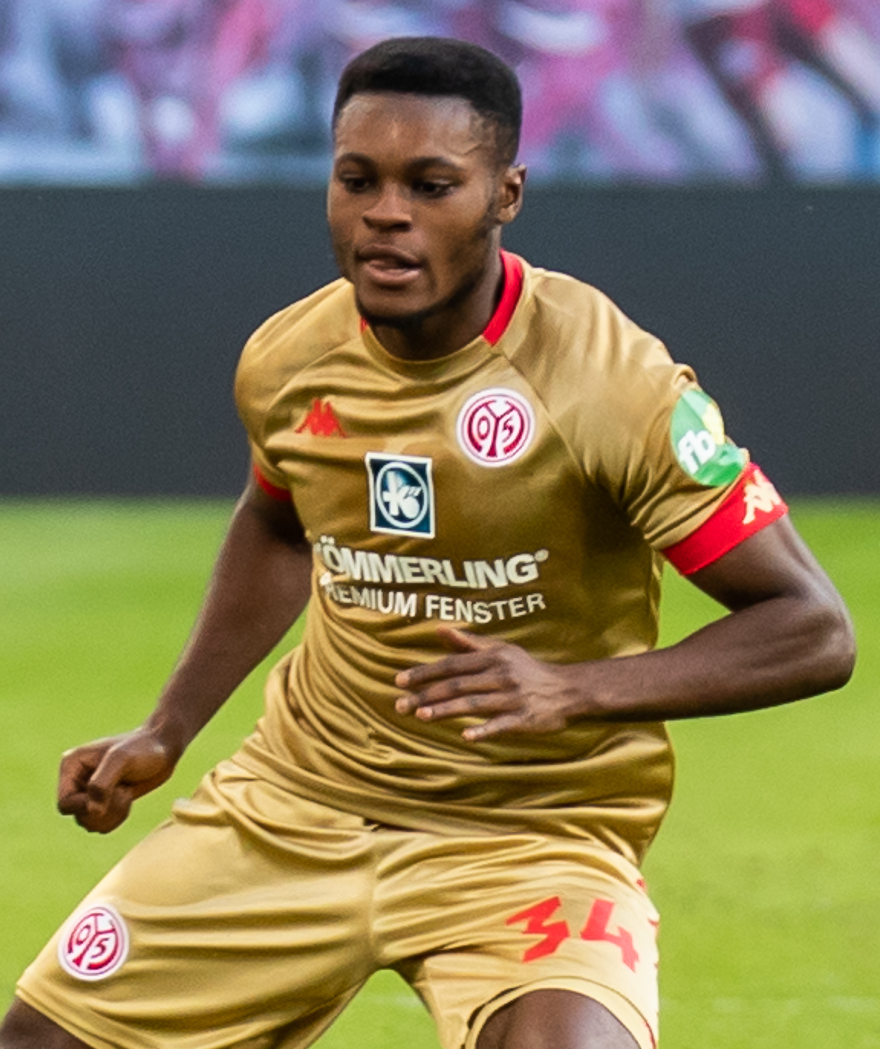
- Baku playing for Mainz 05 in 2020

Personal information
- Full name: Bote Ridle Nzuzi Baku
- Birth name: Bote Nzuzi Baku
- Date of birth: 8 April 1998 (age 28)
- Place of birth: Mainz, Germany
- Height: 1.76 m (5 ft 9 in)
- Positions: Right-back; winger; midfielder

Team information
- Current team: RB Leipzig
- Number: 17

Youth career
- 2007–2018: Mainz 05

Senior career*
Years	Team	Apps	(Gls)
2017–2019	Mainz 05 II	27	(1)
2018–2020	Mainz 05	50	(3)
2020–2025	VfL Wolfsburg	147	(17)
2025–	RB Leipzig	57	(6)

International career^{‡}
2015–2016	Germany U18	10	(1)
2016–2017	Germany U19	10	(3)
2018–2019	Germany U20	3	(0)
2019–2021	Germany U21	14	(2)
2020–	Germany	9	(2)
Medal record
Representing Germany
UEFA European Under-21 Championship
Winner	2021 Hungary–Slovenia
- * Club domestic league appearances and goals as of 17:31, 31 October 2026 (UTC) ‡ National team caps and goals as of 21:49, 13 November 2026 (UTC)

Bote Ridle Nzuzi Baku (born Bote Nzuzi Baku; 8 April 1998) is a German professional footballer who plays as a right-back, winger or midfielder for Bundesliga club RB Leipzig and the Germany national team.

== Club career ==
=== Mainz 05 ===
In the 2017–18 season, Baku joined the squad of Mainz 05 II, making his debut in the Regionalliga Südwest on 30 July 2017 in a 3–0 home win against FSV Frankfurt. Baku scored his first goal for the reserve team on 16 September 2017, scoring Mainz's second in the 82nd minute of the 2–0 home win against Kickers Offenbach.

Baku made his professional debut for Mainz 05 in the 2017–18 DFB-Pokal on 19 December 2017, starting in the 3–1 home win against VfB Stuttgart. He made his Bundesliga debut on 29 April 2018 in the 3–0 home win against RB Leipzig. Baku secured the victory for Mainz, scoring the final goal of the match in the 90th minute.

=== VfL Wolfsburg ===
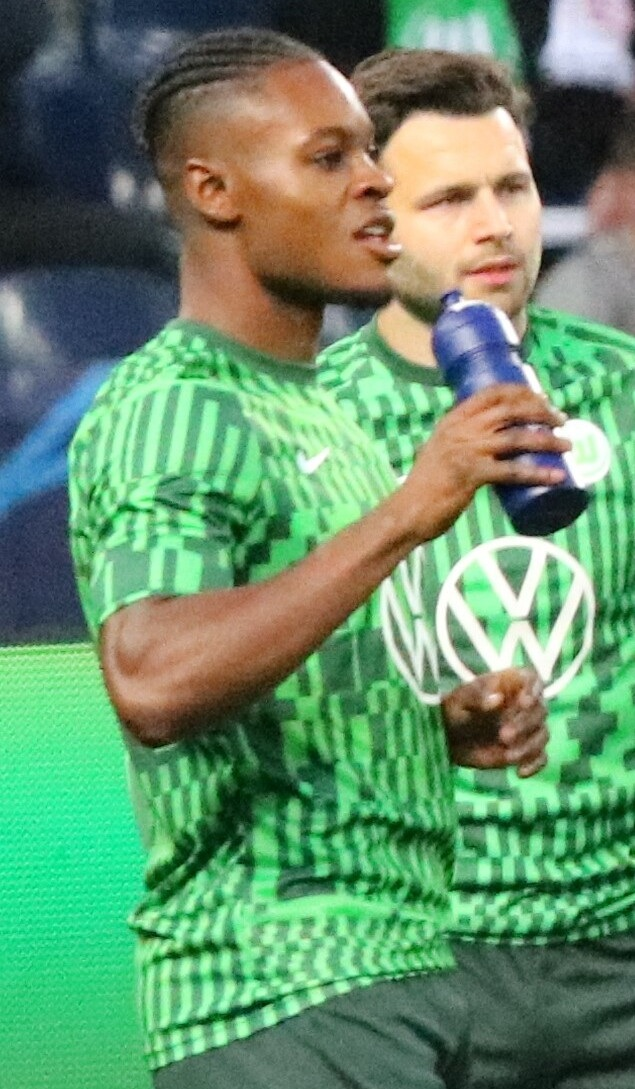
Baku with VfL Wolfsburg in 2021

==== 2020–21 season ====
On 1 October 2020, Baku completed a move to fellow Bundesliga side VfL Wolfsburg, for an undisclosed fee on a five-year contract. He made his club debut three days later in a 0–0 draw with Augsburg, replacing Renato Steffen who had tested positive for COVID-19. He scored his first goal for the club in a 1–1 draw with Hertha Berlin on 1 November.

Baku impressed in his first season at the club and was named to the Bundesliga Team of the Season. He contributed with a league-leading 2583 intensive runs after 31 matchdays, including an also league-leading 993 sprints, over 150 more than the second name on that particular list. He scored six goals and supplied a further four assists to go with 82 crosses, 32 shots, and 305 successful tackles.

==== 2021–22 season ====
Baku scored in Wolfsburg's opening match of the 2021–22 season on 8 August 2021, a 3–1 win over fourth division club SC Preußen Münster in the first round of the DFB-Pokal. However, Wolfsburg used a total of six substitutes, while only five were allowed, and were disqualified after a protest by Preußen Münster. Baku scored again two weeks later in a come-from-behind league win over Hertha Berlin.

=== RB Leipzig ===
On 10 January 2025, Baku signed a two-and-a-half-year contract with RB Leipzig. Later that year, on 5 April, he scored his first goal for the club in a 3–1 win over Hoffenheim.

== International career ==
Baku earned his first call-up for the German senior team on 8 November 2020. His debut came on 11 November 2020, in a friendly game against the Czech Republic. On 6 June 2021, he won the UEFA Under-21 Euro 2021 with the Germany U21, giving the assist to the solitary goal against Portugal.

On 11 November 2021, he scored his first senior international goal in a 9–0 victory over Liechtenstein during the 2022 FIFA World Cup qualification.

== Style of play ==
Baku has been described as an energetic right full-back who can both inflict damage going forward while possessing the defensive nous to hold things together defensively when on the back foot.

== Personal life ==
Born Bote Nzuzi Baku on 8 April 1998 in Mainz, Germany, Baku is of Congolese descent. He is the twin brother of Makana Baku, who is also a professional footballer. He was given the nickname "Ridle" by his father, who was a fan of German footballer Karl-Heinz Riedle. In 2018, Baku had his name legally changed to include Ridle.

== Career statistics ==
=== Club ===
As of match played 4 November 2026

Appearances and goals by club, season and competition
Club	Season	League			DFB-Pokal		Europe		Total	
Club	Season	Division	Apps	Goals	Apps	Goals	Apps	Goals	Apps	Goals
Mainz 05	2017–18	Bundesliga	3	2	1	0	—		4	2
Mainz 05	2018–19	Bundesliga	15	0	1	0	—		16	0
Mainz 05	2019–20	Bundesliga	30	1	1	0	—		31	1
Mainz 05	2020–21	Bundesliga	2	0	1	0	—		3	0
Mainz 05	Total		50	3	4	0	—		54	3
VfL Wolfsburg	2020–21	Bundesliga	32	6	3	0	—		35	6
VfL Wolfsburg	2021–22	Bundesliga	34	3	1	1	6 (Note: Appearances in UEFA Champions League)	1	41	5
VfL Wolfsburg	2022–23	Bundesliga	33	5	3	0	—		36	5
VfL Wolfsburg	2023–24	Bundesliga	33	1	3	1	—		36	2
VfL Wolfsburg	2024–25	Bundesliga	15	2	3	0	—		18	2
VfL Wolfsburg	Total		147	17	13	2	6	1	166	20
RB Leipzig	2024–25	Bundesliga	19	2	2	0	—		21	2
RB Leipzig	2025–26	Bundesliga	32	2	3	0	—		35	2
RB Leipzig	2026–27	Bundesliga	6	2	2	0	4	1	12	3
RB Leipzig	Total		57	6	7	0	4	1	68	7
Career total			254	26	24	2	10	2	288	30

=== International ===
As of match played 13 November 2026

Appearances and goals by national team and year
National team	Year	Apps	Goals
Germany
Germany	2020	1	0
Germany	2021	3	1
Germany	2025	4	1
Germany	2026	1	0
Total		9	2

Germany score listed first, score column indicates score after each Baku goal

List of international goals scored by Ridle Baku
No.	Date	Venue	Cap	Opponent	Score	Result	Competition
1	11 November 2021	Volkswagen Arena, Wolfsburg, Germany	3	Liechtenstein	7–0	9–0	2022 FIFA World Cup qualification
2	17 November 2025	Red Bull Arena, Leipzig, Germany	8	Slovakia	5–0	6–0	2026 FIFA World Cup qualification

== Honours ==
Germany U21

- UEFA European Under-21 Championship: 2021

Individual

- UEFA European Under-21 Championship Team of the Tournament: 2021
- Bundesliga Team of the Season: 2020–21
