= Jean-Philippe Gbamin =

Ivorian footballer (born 1995)

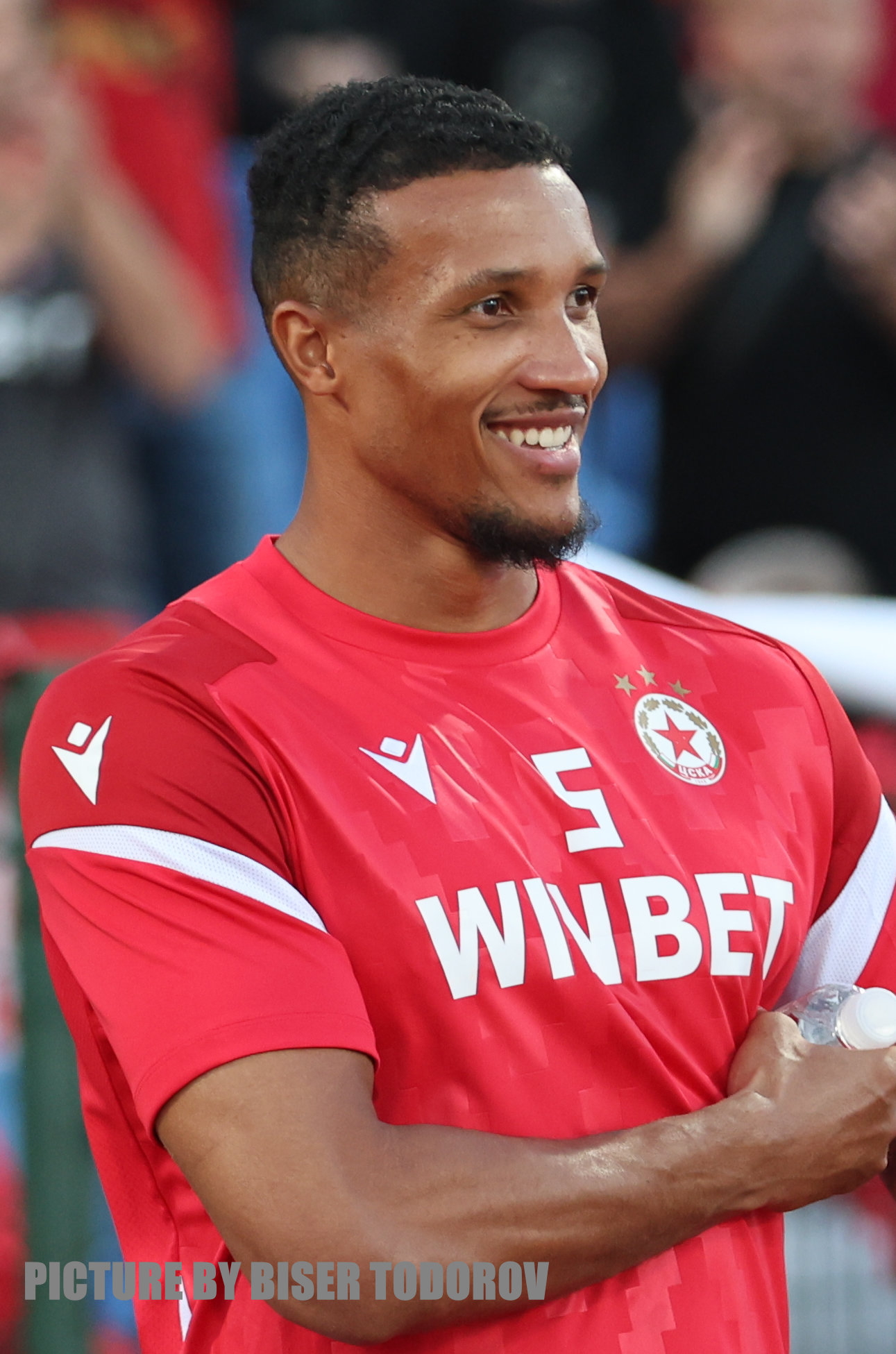
- Gbamin with CSKA Sofia in 2026

Personal information
- Full name: Jean-Philippe Gbamin
- Date of birth: 25 September 1995 (age 31)
- Place of birth: San Pédro, Ivory Coast
- Height: 1.86 m (6 ft 1 in)
- Positions: Centre-back; defensive midfielder

Team information
- Current team: CSKA Sofia
- Number: 5

Youth career
- 2005–2006: US Saint-Quentin Blessy
- 2006–2007: Aire-sur-la-Lys
- 2007–2012: Lens

Senior career*
| Years | Team | Apps | (Gls) |
| 2012–2015 | Lens B | 22 | (2) |
| 2013–2016 | Lens | 91 | (3) |
| 2016–2019 | Mainz 05 | 86 | (3) |
| 2019–2023 | Everton | 6 | (0) |
| 2022 | → CSKA Moscow (loan) | 11 | (2) |
| 2022–2023 | → Trabzonspor (loan) | 19 | (0) |
| 2023–2024 | Dunkerque | 21 | (2) |
| 2024–2025 | Nantes | 14 | (0) |
| 2024 | Nantes B | 2 | (0) |
| 2025 | Zürich | 15 | (1) |
| 2025–2026 | Metz | 31 | (1) |
| 2026– | CSKA Sofia | 14 | (2) |

International career^{‡}
| 2012–2013 | France U18 | 3 | (1) |
| 2013 | France U19 | 9 | (1) |
| 2015–2016 | France U20 | 1 | (0) |
| 2014–2016 | France U21 | 11 | (0) |
| 2017– | Ivory Coast | 24 | (0) |
- * Club domestic league appearances and goals as of 17:56, 22 November 2026 (UTC) ‡ National team caps and goals as of 22:24, 28 December 2025 (UTC)

Jean-Philippe Gbamin (born 25 September 1995) is an Ivorian professional footballer who plays as a centre-back or defensive midfielder for Bulgarian First League club CSKA Sofia and the Ivory Coast national team.

== Club career ==
=== Lens ===
Born in San Pédro, Ivory Coast, Gbamin had spells with French clubs Aire-sur-la-Lys and US Saint-Quentin Blessy, before joining Lens in 2007. In 2013, Gbamin broke into the first team after impressing in the second team, making his debut on 10 May in a 7–0 defeat against Guingamp, in which he replaced Alexandre Coeff fourteen minutes in. Gbamin was assigned the number 25 ahead of the 2013–14 Ligue 2 campaign. On 17 August 2013, Gbamin was given his first Lens start by manager Antoine Kombouaré in a 4–1 victory against Auxerre. On 30 September 2013, Gbamin scored his first goal for Lens in a 3–2 victory over Metz. On 23 November 2013, he scored again in a 2–0 victory over Châteauroux. On 13 February 2014, Gbamin scored the winning goal in extra time, helping Lens to a 2–1 victory over Ligue 1 side Lyon to advance to the quarter-finals of the 2013–14 Coupe de France. By the end of the 2013–14 campaign, Gbamin started to make his Lens breakthrough as a regular starter, assisting them in their promotion to Ligue 1.

=== Mainz 05 ===
On 13 July 2016, Gbamin joined Bundesliga side Mainz 05 on a five-year contract. On 12 May 2018, Gbamin scored his first goal for Mainz in a 1–2 loss to Werder Bremen. On 4 November 2018, he scored another goal against Werder Bremen, this time in a 2–1 victory. He scored again on the next match day, 10 November 2018, opening the scoring in a 3–1 victory over SC Freiburg at the Dreisamstadion. He made 86 league appearances for Mainz over three seasons, featuring at both the defensive midfield and center back positions.

=== Everton ===
Gbamin signed for Premier League club Everton on 2 August 2019 on a five-year contract for a £25 million fee. He made appearances in the club's first two games of the season, before being ruled out for eight weeks due to a thigh injury. In October, it was announced Gbamin would be out injured until January 2020 after having surgery on a thigh injury, but in January he suffered a further setback when additional surgery would keep him out until the end of the season. In May, he injured an Achilles tendon in training, with it estimated he would be injured until November.

Everton manager Carlo Ancelotti stated during an interview in January 2021 that he was hopeful to have Gbamin back in training as soon as possible, but stressed the need for patience with his recovery, insisting he had a role to play in the team despite an extended spell on the sidelines. On 5 April, Gbamin came on as a substitute for James Rodríguez in Everton's 1–1 home league draw against Crystal Palace, making his first appearance for the club since August 2019 due to injury. However, a week later, Gbamin would again be sidelined following a knee injury.

Gbamin made his return from injury in October 2021 when he was listed for selection on the Everton bench for three successive Premier League games. On 1 November, Gbamin started for Everton for the first time since returning from injury, playing Wolverhampton Wanderers away in a 2–1 loss.

==== CSKA Moscow loan ====
On 21 February 2022, CSKA Moscow announced the loan signing of Gbamin until the end of the season. On 20 March, Gbamin scored his first goal with CSKA in a 6–1 rout of Rubin Kazan. On 19 May, CSKA confirmed that Gbamin would leave the club upon the expiration of his loan deal, and he would return to Everton.

==== Trabzonspor loan ====
On 22 August 2022, Gbamin joined Turkish side Trabzonspor on loan for the season. Gbamin made his debut with Trabzonspor on 28 August, coming on for Emmanouil Siopis at halftime in a 0–0 draw with Galatasaray. He ended the season making 24 appearances for the Turkish side.

==== Return to Everton and departure ====
On 30 May 2023, Gbamin's agent said the player's time at Everton had been "a nightmare" and he wanted to leave the club, albeit he had one year left on his contract. On 2 September, Gbamin left Everton by mutual consent.

=== Dunkerque ===
On 8 November 2023, Gbamin joined Ligue 2 club Dunkerque on a free transfer, signing a contract until the end of the season. On 3 May 2024, Gbamin scored his first goal with Dunkerque, the winner in an important 2–1 victory over Quevilly-Rouen, a match between two sides trying to avoid relegation. A week later, on 10 May, Gbamin scored another important goal for Dunkerque, the equalizer in a 2–2 draw with Caen, a result that helped maintain his club in Ligue 2.

=== Nantes ===
On 28 August 2024, Gbamin signed for Ligue 1 club Nantes for one season.

=== Zürich ===
On 3 February 2025, Gbamin signed a half-season contract with Zürich in Switzerland.

=== Metz ===
On 15 July 2025, Gbamin moved to Metz in France on a one-season contract.

=== CSKA Sofia ===
On 5 July 2026, Gbamin joined Bulgarian First League side CSKA Sofia on a two-year contract.

== International career ==
Gbamin represented France at under-18, under-19, under-20 and under-21 level, making his under-21 debut in a 1–1 draw against Italy U-20 on 13 November 2014.

Gbamin was also eligible to represent Ivory Coast at international level due to his parents' nationalities and his birthplace. In April 2017, it was announced that Gbamin had committed himself to playing for the Ivory Coast internationally. He made his senior debut for Ivory Coast in a 5–0 friendly loss to the Netherlands on 4 June 2017.

In June 2019, Gbamin was named among the twenty-three Ivorian players selected to take part in the 2019 Africa Cup of Nations. He featured in three matches during the tournament, in which Ivory Coast were eliminated in the quarter-finals by Algeria, the eventual champions.

Gbamin was included in the list of Ivorian players selected by coach Emerse Faé to participate in the 2025 Africa Cup of Nations.

== Career statistics ==
=== Club ===
As of match played 22 November 2026

Appearances and goals by club, season and competition
| Club | Season | League | | | National Cup | | League Cup | | Europe | | Other | | Total | |
| Club | Season | Division | Apps | Goals | Apps | Goals | Apps | Goals | Apps | Goals | Apps | Goals | Apps | Goals |
|---|---|---|---|---|---|---|---|---|---|---|---|---|---|---|
| Lens B | 2012–13 | CFA | 20 | 2 | — | | — | | — | | — | | 20 | 2 |
| Lens B | 2015–16 | CFA | 2 | 0 | — | | — | | — | | — | | 2 | 0 |
| Lens B | Total | | 22 | 2 | — | | — | | — | | — | | 22 | 2 |
| Lens | 2012–13 | Ligue 2 | 2 | 0 | 0 | 0 | 0 | 0 | — | | — | | 2 | 0 |
| Lens | 2013–14 | Ligue 2 | 30 | 2 | 4 | 1 | 2 | 0 | — | | — | | 36 | 3 |
| Lens | 2014–15 | Ligue 1 | 33 | 0 | 1 | 0 | 1 | 0 | — | | — | | 35 | 0 |
| Lens | 2015–16 | Ligue 2 | 26 | 1 | 0 | 0 | 0 | 0 | — | | — | | 26 | 1 |
| Lens | Total | | 91 | 3 | 5 | 1 | 3 | 0 | 0 | 0 | 0 | 0 | 99 | 4 |
| Mainz 05 | 2016–17 | Bundesliga | 25 | 0 | 1 | 0 | — | | — | | 5 | 0 | 31 | 0 |
| Mainz 05 | 2017–18 | Bundesliga | 30 | 1 | 1 | 0 | — | | — | | — | | 31 | 1 |
| Mainz 05 | 2018–19 | Bundesliga | 31 | 2 | 2 | 0 | — | | — | | — | | 33 | 2 |
| Mainz 05 | Total | | 86 | 3 | 4 | 0 | 0 | 0 | 0 | 0 | 5 | 0 | 95 | 3 |
| Everton | 2019–20 | Premier League | 2 | 0 | 0 | 0 | — | | — | | — | | 2 | 0 |
| Everton | 2020–21 | Premier League | 1 | 0 | 0 | 0 | 0 | 0 | — | | — | | 1 | 0 |
| Everton | 2021–22 | Premier League | 3 | 0 | 1 | 0 | 1 | 0 | — | | — | | 5 | 0 |
| Everton | Total | | 6 | 0 | 1 | 0 | 1 | 0 | 0 | 0 | 0 | 0 | 8 | 0 |
| CSKA Moscow (loan) | 2021–22 | Russian Premier League | 11 | 2 | 2 | 0 | — | | — | | — | | 13 | 2 |
| Trabzonspor (loan) | 2022–23 | Süper Lig | 19 | 0 | 1 | 0 | — | | — | | 4 | 0 | 24 | 0 |
| Dunkerque | 2023–24 | Ligue 2 | 21 | 2 | 0 | 0 | 0 | 0 | — | | 0 | 0 | 21 | 2 |
| Nantes | 2024–25 | Ligue 1 | 14 | 0 | 1 | 0 | — | | — | | — | | 15 | 0 |
| Nantes B | 2024–25 | National 3 | 14 | 0 | 1 | 0 | — | | — | | — | | 15 | 0 |
| Zürich | 2024–25 | Swiss Super League | 15 | 1 | 1 | 0 | — | | — | | — | | 16 | 1 |
| Metz | 2025–26 | Ligue 1 | 31 | 1 | 0 | 0 | — | | — | | — | | 31 | 1 |
| CSKA Sofia | 2026–27 | First League | 14 | 2 | 0 | 0 | — | | 8 | 0 | 1 | 0 | 23 | 2 |
| Career total | | | 330 | 15 | 15 | 1 | 4 | 0 | 8 | 0 | 10 | 0 | 367 | 17 |

=== International ===
As of match played 28 December 2025

Ivory Coast
| Year | Apps | Goals |
|---|---|---|
| 2017 | 4 | 0 |
| 2018 | 1 | 0 |
| 2019 | 6 | 0 |
| 2022 | 4 | 0 |
| 2023 | 2 | 0 |
| 2025 | 7 | 0 |
| Total | 24 | 0 |

== Honours ==
France U19

- UEFA European Under-19 Championship runner-up: 2013

CSKA Sofia

- Bulgarian Supercup: 2026
