= Suat Serdar =

German footballer (born 1997)

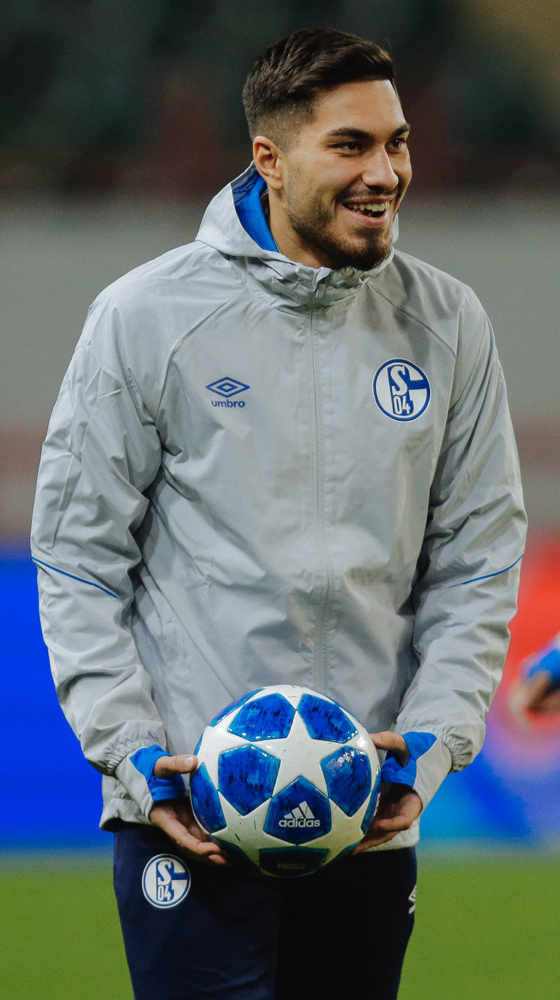
- Serdar with Schalke 04 in 2018

Personal information
- Full name: Suat Serdar
- Date of birth: 11 April 1997 (age 29)
- Place of birth: Bingen am Rhein, Germany
- Height: 1.84 m (6 ft 0 in)
- Position: Midfielder

Team information
- Current team: Hellas Verona
- Number: 8

Youth career
- –2008: Hassia Bingen
- 2008–2015: Mainz 05

Senior career*
Years	Team	Apps	(Gls)
2015–2017	Mainz 05 II	13	(0)
2015–2018	Mainz 05	45	(2)
2018–2021	Schalke 04	71	(10)
2021–2024	Hertha BSC	62	(7)
2023–2024	→ Hellas Verona (loan)	25	(0)
2024–	Hellas Verona	42	(4)

International career
2012	Germany U16	4	(0)
2013	Germany U17	4	(0)
2014–2015	Germany U18	4	(0)
2015–2016	Germany U19	11	(3)
2017	Germany U20	8	(1)
2017–2019	Germany U21	8	(2)
2019–2020	Germany	4	(0)
Medal record
Men's football
Representing Germany
UEFA European Under-21 Championship
Runner-up	2019 Italy-San Marino
- * Club domestic league appearances and goals as of 25 May 2026

Suat Serdar (born 11 April 1997) is a German professional footballer who plays as a midfielder for and captains Serie B club Hellas Verona.

== Club career ==
=== Mainz ===
Serdar made his Bundesliga debut on 18 September 2015 against TSG Hoffenheim replacing Yunus Mallı after 88 minutes in a 3–1 home win.

=== Schalke 04 ===
On 17 May 2018, it was announced that Serdar would be joining Schalke 04 on a four-year contract. Many people consider that Serdar was Schalke's best player during the 2019/20 season.

=== Hertha BSC ===
On 15 June 2021, Serdar signed a five-year contract with Hertha BSC. He made his debut in the DFB-Pokal first round against SV Meppen, as Hertha advanced following a late goal in a 1–0 victory. His league debut followed on 15 August in a 3–1 loss away against FC Köln. He tested positive for SARS‑CoV‑2 amid its pandemic.

=== Hellas Verona ===
On 22 August 2023, Serdar was loaned with an option to buy to Hellas Verona, where he played 26 games and gave two assists. He was a key player in Hellas' midfield, helping them to avoid relegation with a match to spare and securing top flight football for the sixth time in a row. After the end of the season, the Scaligeri decided to trigger the buy option and sign him on a permanent transfer for the term of four years.

== International career ==
Born in Germany, Serdar is of Turkish descent. He represented Germany at the U16, 17, 18, 19 and 20 levels.

He made his Germany national team debut on 9 October 2019 in a friendly against Argentina. He replaced Serge Gnabry in the 72nd minute.

== Career statistics ==
As of match played 29 October 2025

Appearances and goals by club, season and competition
Club	Season	League			National Cup		Other		Total	
Club	Season	Division	Apps	Goals	Apps	Goals	Apps	Goals	Apps	Goals
Mainz 05 II	2015–16	3. Liga	7	0	—		—		7	0
Mainz 05 II	2016–17	3. Liga	6	0	—		—		6	0
Mainz 05 II	Total		13	0	—		—		13	0
Mainz 05	2015–16	Bundesliga	12	0	0	0	—		12	0
Mainz 05	2016–17	Bundesliga	8	0	2	0	4 (Note: Appearances in UEFA Europa League)	0	14	0
Mainz 05	2017–18	Bundesliga	25	2	3	1	—		28	3
Mainz 05	Total		45	2	5	1	4	0	54	3
Schalke 04	2018–19	Bundesliga	26	2	2	0	7 (Note: Appearances in UEFA Champions League)	0	35	2
Schalke 04	2019–20	Bundesliga	20	7	2	0	—		22	7
Schalke 04	2020–21	Bundesliga	25	1	1	1	—		26	2
Schalke 04	Total		71	10	5	1	7	0	83	11
Hertha BSC	2021–22	Bundesliga	30	3	3	1	2 (Note: Appearances in Bundesliga relegation play-offs)	0	35	4
Hertha BSC	2022–23	Bundesliga	32	4	1	0	—		33	4
Hertha BSC	2023–24	2. Bundesliga	0	0	1	0	—		1	0
Hertha BSC	Total		62	7	5	1	2	0	69	8
Hellas Verona (loan)	2023–24	Serie A	25	0	1	0	—		26	0
Hellas Verona	2024–25	Serie A	22	2	0	0	—		22	2
Hellas Verona	2025–26	Serie A	9	2	1	0	—		10	2
Hellas Verona	Total		56	4	2	0	—		58	4
Career total			247	23	17	3	13	0	277	26

=== International ===
As of 3 September 2020

National team	Year	Apps	Goals
Germany	2019	3	0
Germany	2020	1	0
Total		4	0

== Honours ==
Germany U21

- UEFA European Under-21 Championship runner-up: 2019
