= Daniel Brosinski =

German footballer (born 1988)

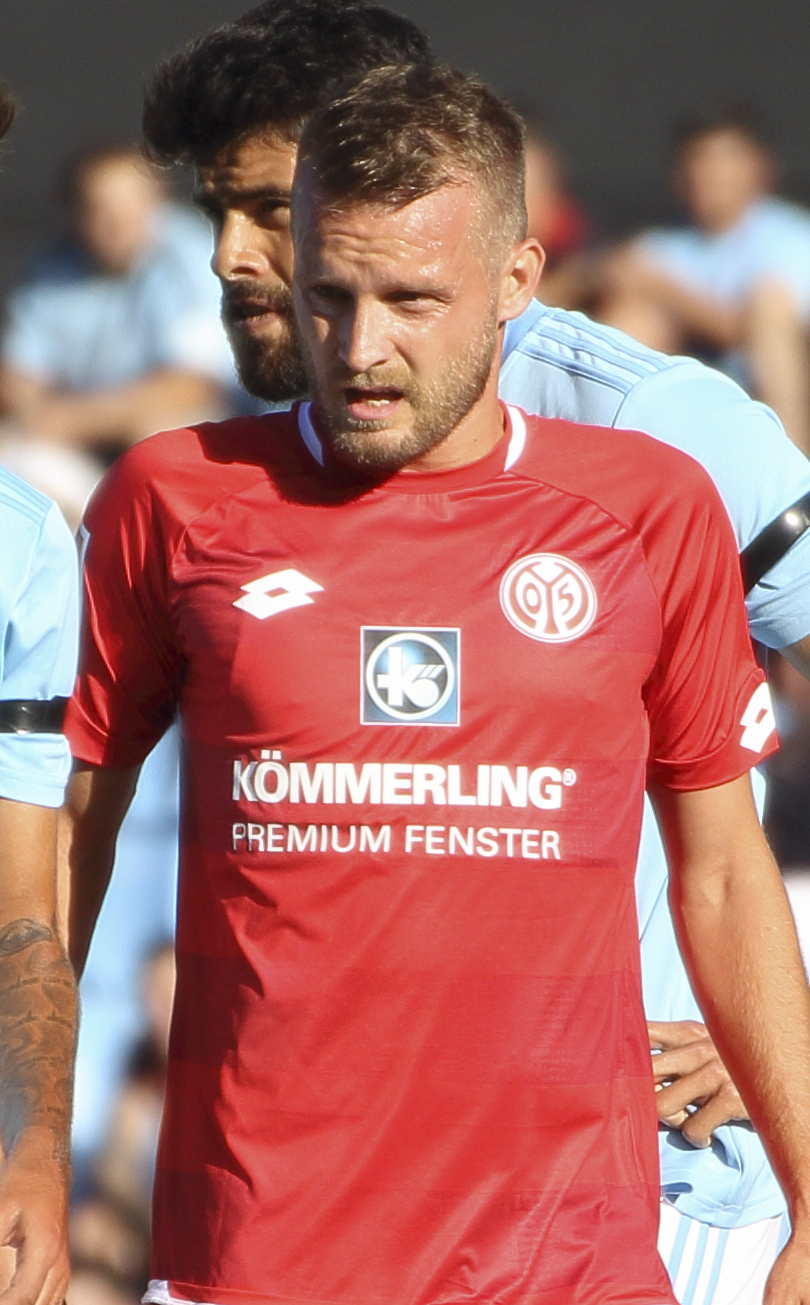
- Brosinski with Mainz 05 in 2018

Personal information
- Date of birth: 17 July 1988 (age 38)
- Place of birth: Karlsruhe, West Germany
- Height: 1.78 m (5 ft 10 in)
- Position: Right-back

Team information
- Current team: FV Fortuna Kirchfeld

Youth career
- –2001: SG Siemens Karlsruhe
- 2001–2006: Karlsruher SC

Senior career*
Years	Team	Apps	(Gls)
2006–2008	Karlsruher SC II	31	(3)
2008–2011	1. FC Köln II	3	(0)
2008–2011	1. FC Köln	20	(1)
2011	SV Wehen Wiesbaden	19	(5)
2011–2013	MSV Duisburg	65	(8)
2013–2014	Greuther Fürth	34	(3)
2014–2022	Mainz 05	204	(10)
2023–2024	Karlsruher SC	27	(0)
2024–	FV Fortuna Kirchfeld		

International career
2007–2008	Germany U20	4	(1)
- * Club domestic league appearances and goals as of 22 May 2024

Daniel Brosinski (born 17 July 1988) is a German professional footballer who plays as a right-back for an amateur side FV Fortuna Kirchfeld.

== Career ==
Brosinski was born in Karlsruhe. He played his first Bundesliga match for 1. FC Köln (which was his first fully professional match) on 21 February 2009 in a 2–1 away win against Bayern Munich. He scored 1. FC Köln's second goal.

Although he had signed for Greuther Fürth a two-year contract until 2015, after Fürth's failed to gain promotion in 2014, Brosinski stated his desire to play in the Bundesliga. On 3 July 2014, Fürth complied with his wishes and allowed him to join 1. FSV Mainz 05 for transfer believed to be about €1 million. He signed a four-year contract expiring June 2018. At Mainz he was planned to be the successor of Zdeněk Pospěch who left the club at the age of 35 and went back home to the Czech Republic.

On 3 January 2023, Brosinski signed for his hometown club Karlsruher SC on a contract until the end of the season. On 15 August 2023, Brosinski and Karlsruher SC extended the contract until 30 June 2024. In April 2024 he announced he would retire from playing at the end of the season, becoming the third Karlsruhe player to do so during the season after teammates Jérôme Gondorf and Lars Stindl.

== Career statistics ==
As of 30 January 2018

Appearances and goals by club, season and competition
Club	Season	League			Cup		Other		Total	
Club	Season	Division	Apps	Goals	Apps	Goals	Apps	Goals	Apps	Goals
Karlsruher SC II	2006–07	Regionalliga Süd	3	0	0	0	0	0	3	0
Karlsruher SC II	2007–08	Regionalliga Süd	28	3	0	0	0	0	28	3
Karlsruher SC II	Total		31	3	0	0	0	0	31	3
Karlsruher SC	2007–08	Bundesliga	0	0	0	0	0	0	0	0
1. FC Köln II	2008–09	Regionalliga West	3	0	0	0	0	0	3	0
1. FC Köln	2008–09	Bundesliga	10	1	0	0	0	0	10	1
1. FC Köln	2009–10	Bundesliga	9	0	1	0	0	0	10	0
1. FC Köln	2010–11	Bundesliga	1	0	0	0	0	0	1	0
1. FC Köln	Total		20	1	1	0	0	0	21	1
Wehen Wiesbaden	2010–11	3. Liga	19	5	0	0	0	0	19	5
MSV Duisburg	2011–12	2. Bundesliga	33	5	2	0	0	0	35	5
MSV Duisburg	2012–13	2. Bundesliga	32	3	2	0	0	0	34	3
MSV Duisburg	Total		65	8	4	0	0	0	69	8
Greuther Fürth	2013–14	2. Bundesliga	34	3	2	0	2 (Note: Appearances in Bundesliga Relegation play-offs)	0	36	3
Mainz 05	2014–15	Bundesliga	32	0	1	0	2 (Note: Appearances in UEFA Europa League)	0	35	0
Mainz 05	2015–16	Bundesliga	30	1	2	0	0	0	32	1
Mainz 05	2016–17	Bundesliga	29	1	2	0	4	0	35	1
Mainz 05	2017–18	Bundesliga	29	1	3	2	0	0	32	3
Mainz 05	Total		120	3	8	2	6	0	134	5
Career total			292	23	15	2	8	0	315	25
