= Pablo de Blasis =

Argentine footballer

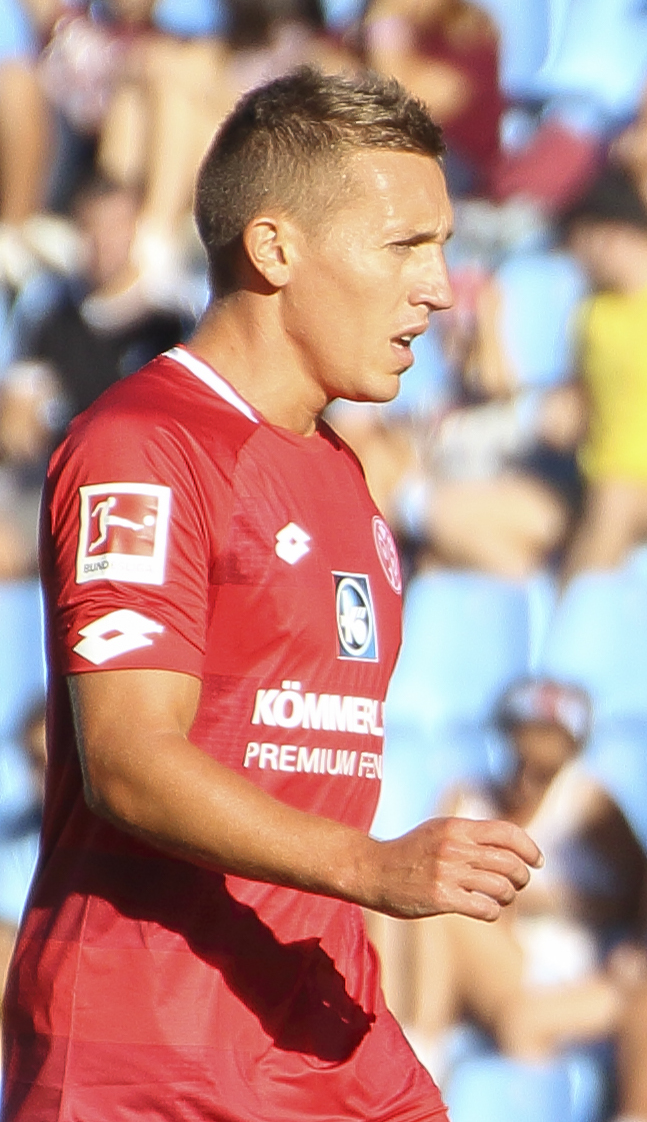
- De Blasis with Mainz 05 in 2018

Personal information
- Full name: Pablo Ezequiel de Blasis
- Date of birth: 4 February 1988 (age 38)
- Place of birth: La Plata, Argentina
- Height: 1.66 m (5 ft 5 1/2 in)
- Positions: Attacking midfielder; winger

Team information
- Current team: Cartagena
- Number: 8

Youth career
- Gimnasia

Senior career*
Years	Team	Apps	(Gls)
2008–2012	Gimnasia	27	(4)
2010–2011	→ Ferro Carril Oeste (loan)	33	(0)
2012–2014	Asteras Tripolis	71	(14)
2014–2018	Mainz 05	103	(15)
2018–2020	Eibar	54	(4)
2021–2023	Cartagena	96	(8)
2023–2025	Gimnasia	59	(4)
2025–	Cartagena	30	(3)
- * Club domestic league appearances and goals as of 10 June 2026

Pablo Ezequiel de Blasis (born 4 February 1988) is an Argentine professional footballer who plays as an attacking midfielder or a winger for Spanish Primera Federación club Cartagena.

== Career ==
He made his senior debut on 30 May 2008 for Gimnasia against Vélez Sarsfield. In January 2010 the second division team Ferro Carril Oeste signed the attacking midfielder on loan from Gimnasia y Esgrima until June 2011. Pablo de Blasis has got the most assist at Ferro Carril Oeste assisting 5 goals in 15 matches. In 2011, he returned to Gimnasia y Esgrima, which was playing in the Argentine second division. He started the majority of the games for Gimnasia. At the end of the season, he became a free agent. In July 2012, he signed with Asteras Tripolis, which was playing in the Super League. He made his debut with the club on 2 September 2012 in a 3–0 home victory against Kerkyra.

On 31 August 2014, after playing against them with Asteras Tripolis in the UEFA Europa League, 1. FSV Mainz 05 completed the signing of Pablo de Blasis. The 26-year-old attacker made an immediate switch to the Bundesliga from Greek first-division side Asteras Tripolis. De Blasis was the main reason Asteras Tripolis made it to the Europa League group stage for the first time in its history this season. His performance in the playoff matches against Mainz 05 also led to a transfer to the German club with a highly privileged contract. The Argentine signed a three-year contract which ran until June 2017. The transfer fee was around €1.2 million.

He scored a controversial penalty for Mainz given via VAR technology after the half time whistle with the opposition players from Freiburg already back in the dressing room. He scored again to seal a 2–0 victory for his side.

On 30 August 2018, de Blasis signed a two-year deal with La Liga side Eibar. He left the club in 2020, as his contract expired.

On 15 January 2021, de Blasis agreed to a short-term contract with Cartagena, in Segunda División.

After two years back at Gimnasia, on 4 August 2025 de Blasis returned to Cartagena, now in Primera Federación.

== Style of play ==
De Blasis is a flexible attacker, who can play up top or on the wings.

== Club ==
As of 19 May 2019

Club	Season	League		Cup		International		Total	
Club	Season	Apps	Goals	Apps	Goals	Apps	Goals	Apps	Goals
Ferro Carril Oeste	2009–10	13	0	0	0	0	0	13	0
Ferro Carril Oeste	2010–11	20	0	0	0	0	0	20	0
Ferro Carril Oeste	Total	33	0	0	0	0	0	33	0
Gimnasia y Esgrima La Plata	2011–12	27	4	0	0	0	0	27	4
Asteras Tripolis	2012–13	33	4	9	2	0	0	42	6
Asteras Tripolis	2013–14	38	10	3	1	2	0	43	11
Asteras Tripolis	2014–15	0	0	0	0	6	3	6	3
Asteras Tripolis	Total	71	18	12	3	8	3	91	24
Mainz 05	2014–15	20	1	0	0	0	0	20	1
Mainz 05	2015–16	26	4	1	0	0	0	27	4
Mainz 05	2016–17	31	5	2	0	5	2	38	7
Mainz 05	2017–18	25	5	3	0	0	0	28	5
Mainz 05	2018–19	1	0	1	0	0	0	2	0
Mainz 05	Total	103	15	7	0	5	2	115	17
Eibar	2018–19	24	2	1	0	0	0	25	2
Career Total		258	35	20	3	13	5	264	43
