= 2026–27 1. FSV Mainz 05 season =

Mainz 05
2026–27 season
- President: Stefan Hofmann
- Head coach: Urs Fischer
- Stadium: Mewa Arena

The 2026–27 season is the 122nd season in the history of 1. FSV Mainz 05, and the club's 18th consecutive season in the Bundesliga. In addition to the domestic league, the club participated in the DFB-Pokal.

== Players ==
=== Current squad ===
As of 2 September 2026

No.	Pos.	Nation	Player
1	GK	GER	Alexander Schwolow
2	DF	AUT	Phillipp Mwene
3	DF	PER	Fabio Gruber
4	DF	AUT	Stefan Posch
5	MF	GER	Eric Martel
6	MF	JPN	Kaishū Sano
7	MF	KOR	Lee Jae-sung
8	MF	GER	Paul Nebel
9	FW	GER	Phillip Tietz
10	MF	GER	Nadiem Amiri
11	FW	GHA	Ransford-Yeboah Königsdörffer
15	MF	USA	Lennard Maloney
16	DF	GER	Stefan Bell

No.	Pos.	Nation	Player
17	FW	GER	Benedict Hollerbach
19	DF	FRA	Anthony Caci
20	MF	FIN	Otto Ruoppi
21	DF	GER	Danny da Costa
23	FW	SUR	Sheraldo Becker
24	MF	JPN	Sōta Kawasaki
26	FW	COD	Silas
27	GK	GER	Robin Zentner
30	DF	SUI	Silvan Widmer (captain)
31	DF	GER	Dominik Kohr
39	FW	CIV	Alynho Haïdara
40	GK	GER	Maximilian Kinzig
48	DF	POL	Kacper Potulski

=== Out on loan ===
Note: Flags indicate national team as defined under FIFA eligibility rules; some limited exceptions apply. Players may hold more than one non-FIFA nationality.

No.	Pos.	Nation	Player
—	GK	GER	Lasse Rieß (at Fortuna Düsseldorf until 30 June 2027)
—	DF	AUS	Kasey Bos (at Excelsior until 30 June 2027)
—	DF	AUT	Konstantin Schopp (at TSV Hartberg until 30 June 2027)
—	MF	GER	Daniel Gleiber (at 1. FC Saarbrücken until 30 June 2027)

No.	Pos.	Nation	Player
—	MF	KOR	Hong Hyun-seok (at Midtjylland until 30 June 2027)
—	FW	DEN	William Bøving (at 1. FC Nürnberg until 30 June 2027)
—	FW	GER	Nelson Weiper (at Sturm Graz until 30 June 2027)

== Transfers ==
=== Transfers in ===
Date	Pos.	Nat.	Name	Club	Fee	Ref.
8 May 2026	FW	(Suriname)	Sheraldo Becker	(Spain) Osasuna	Undisclosed	
19 May 2026	DF	(Germany)	Eric Martel	(Germany) 1. FC Köln	Undisclosed	
20 May 2026	FW	(Ghana)	Ransford-Yeboah Königsdörffer	(Germany) Hamburger SV	Undisclosed	
12 June 2026	DF	(Peru)	Fabio Gruber	(Germany) 1. FC Nürnberg	Undisclosed	
17 July 2026	GK	(Austria)	Alexander Schwolow	(Scotland) Heart of Midlothian F.C.	Undisclosed	

=== Transfers out ===
Date	Pos.	Nat.	Name	Club	Fee	Ref.
28 May 2026	MF	(Germany)	Tom Krauß	(Germany) 1. FC Köln	Undisclosed	
9 June 2026	MF	(Austria)	Nikolas Veratschnig	(Austria) Red Bull Salzburg	Undisclosed	
17 July 2026	FW	(Germany)	Ben Bobzien	(Germany) Dynamo Dresden	Undisclosed	

=== Loans out ===
Date	Pos.	Nat.	Name	Club	Duration	Ref.
3 June 2026	DF	(Australia)	Kasey Bos	(Netherlands) Excelsior	30 June 2027	
6 July 2026	GK	(Germany)	Lasse Rieß	(Germany) Fortuna Düsseldorf	30 June 2027	
17 June 2026	FW	(Austria)	Nelson Weiper	(Austria) Sturm Graz	30 June 2027	
28 August 2026	FW	(Denmark)	William Bøving	(Germany) 1. FC Nürnberg	30 June 2027	
2 September 2026	MF	(South Korea)	Hong Hyun-seok	(Denmark) FC Midtjylland	30 June 2027	

== Competitions ==
=== Bundesliga ===
==== League table ====
Pos	Team	Pld	W	D	L	GF	GA	GD	Pts
11	TSG Hoffenheim	10	4	0	6	16	18	−2	12
12	Hamburger SV	10	4	0	6	10	24	−14	12
13	Mainz 05	10	3	1	6	19	22	−3	10
14	1. FC Köln	10	2	4	4	11	15	−4	10
15	SC Paderborn	10	2	4	4	8	15	−7	10

Updated to match(es) played on 22 November 2026. Source: Bundesliga
Rules for classification: 1) Points; 2) Goal difference; 3) Goals scored; 4) Head-to-head aggregate results; 5) Head-to-head away goals scored; 6) Away goals scored; 7) Play-off at neutral site.
(Rules 4–6 only apply after all home-and-away matches have been played between the tied teams. Rule 7 only applies after the completion of the season.)

==== Matches ====
29 August 2026 1	Mainz 05	0–0	SC Paderborn 07	Mewa Arena
	Mwene (yellow card) 90+1'	Report	Castañeda (yellow card) 38'; Hansen (yellow card) 72'	Attendance: 33,005; Referee: Tobias Stieler

6 September 2026 2	Hamburger SV	0–5	Mainz 05	Hamburg
15:30 CEST	El Ouahdi (yellow card) 36'	Report	Becker 19', (yellow card) 90+2'; Caci (yellow card) 31'; Mwene 41', (yellow card) 85'; Tietz 48', 83'; Königsdörffer 90+1'	Stadium: Volksparkstadion; Attendance: 57,000; Referee: Tobias Reichel

12 September 2026 3	Mainz 05	1–3	Eintracht Frankfurt	Mainz
15:30 CEST (UTC+2)	Amiri (penalty missed) 43'; Tietz 89'		Uzun 9', 60'; Onyedika (yellow card) 41'; Burkardt 45+1'; Götze (yellow card) 70'	Stadium: Mewa Arena; Referee: Felix Zwayer

19 September 2026 4	Borussia Mönchengladbach	3–4	Mainz 05	Mönchengladbach
15:30 CEST	Neuhaus 11', (yellow card) 62'; Ullrich (yellow card) 19'; Honorat (yellow card) 55'; Lidberg 59'; Stöger (yellow card) 87'; Mohya (yellow card) 87'; Machino (yellow card) 90+3', (goal) 90+5' (pen.)	Report	Tietz 18'; Becker 45+1'; Posch (yellow card) 55'; Mwene (yellow card) 73'; Martel 78'; da Costa 89'; Potulski (yellow card) 90+3'; Schwolow (yellow card) 90+4'; Königsdörffer (yellow card) 90+7'	Stadium: Borussia-Park; Referee: Robert Hartmann

10 October 2026 5	Mainz 05	3–4	Bayer 04 Leverkusen	Mainz
15:30	Tietz (yellow card) 20'; Caci 33', 42'; Becker (yellow card) 35'; Lee Jae-sung (yellow card) 76'; Hollerbach 90+2'	Report	Andrich 5'; Schick 9'; Quansah 55', (yellow card) 90+3'; Diaby 65'	Stadium: Mewa Arena; Referee: Max Burda

17 October 2026 6	Schalke 04	0–1	Mainz 05	Gelsenkirchen
15:30 CEST (UTC+2)		Report	Tietz 24'; Amiri (yellow card) 42'; Sano (yellow card) 45'	Stadium: Veltins-Arena; Referee: Richard Hempel

24 October 2026 7	Mainz 05	2–3	SV Werder Bremen	Mainz
15:30 CEST (UTC+2)	Caci 33'; Lee Jae-sung 63'; Mwene (yellow card) 69'; Hollerbach (yellow card) 88'; Schwolow (yellow card) 90+4'	Report	Füllkrug 7' (pen.), 25' (pen.); Reis (yellow card) 38', (goal) 61'; Grüll (yellow card) 88'	Stadium: Mewa Arena; Attendance: 33,305; Referee: Florian Badstübner

30 October 2026 8	SV Elversberg	4–1	Mainz 05	Spiesen-Elversberg
20:30 CET	Keidel 7'; Onyeka 26'; Krattenmacher 45+1'; Campbell 90+1'	Report	Mwene (yellow card) 4'; Da Costa (yellow card) 33'; Königsdörffer (yellow card) 75'; Posch (yellow card) 85' (yellow-red card) 90+5'; Hollerbach 90+2'	Stadium: Waldstadion an der Kaiserlinde; Attendance: 9,307; Referee: Sascha Stegemann

7 November 2026 9	Mainz 05	1–2	Bayern Munich	Mainz
15:30 CET	Tietz 90+3'	Report	Kimmich 14'; Karl 57'; Laimer (yellow card) 76'	Stadium: Mewa Arena; Attendance: 33,305; Referee: Robert Schröder

22 November 2026 10	Augsburg	3–1	Mainz 05	Augsburg
14:30 CET (UTC+1)	Gregoritsch 19', 48'; Bah 36'; Fellhauer (yellow card) 44'	Report	Amiri (yellow card) 43'; Königsdörffer 51'; Posch (yellow card) 75'; Widmer (yellow card) 76'	Stadium: WWK Arena; Attendance: 29,680; Referee: Martin Petersen

28 November 2026 11	Mainz 05	v	Union Berlin
		Report

4–6 December 2026 12	RB Leipzig	v	Mainz 05	Leipzig
--:-- CET (UTC+1)		Report		Stadium: Red Bull Arena

11 – 13 December 2026 13	Mainz 05	v	SC Freiburg
		Report

19 December 2026 14	Mainz 05	v	1. FC Köln	Mainz
		Report		Stadium: Mewa Arena

8–10 January 2027 15	Borussia Dortmund	v	Mainz 05	Dortmund
--:-- CET (UTC+1)		Report		Stadium: Signal Iduna Park

12 – 14 January 2027 16	Mainz 05	v	TSG Hoffenheim
		Report

15–17 January 2027 17	VfB Stuttgart	v	Mainz 05	Stuttgart
		Report		Stadium: MHPArena

22 – 24 January 2027 18	SC Paderborn 07	v	Mainz 05
		Report

29 – 31 January 2027 19	Mainz 05	v	Hamburger SV
		Report

5–7 February 2027 20	Eintracht Frankfurt	v	Mainz 05	Frankfurt
				Stadium: Deutsche Bank Park

13 February 2027 21	Mainz 05	v	Borussia Mönchengladbach	Mainz
15:30 CET		Report		Stadium: Mewa Arena

19 – 21 February 2027 22	Bayer 04 Leverkusen	v	Mainz 05
		Report

26–28 February 2027 23	Mainz 05	v	Schalke 04	Mainz
		Report		Stadium: Mewa Arena

2 – 4 March 2027 24	SV Werder Bremen	v	Mainz 05
		Report

5 – 7 March 2027 25	Mainz 05	v	SV Elversberg
		Report

12–14 March 2027 26	Bayern Munich	v	Mainz 05	Munich
--:-- CET		Report		Stadium: Allianz Arena

18-20 March 2027 27	Mainz 05	v	Augsburg	Mainz
		Report		Stadium: Mewa Arena

2 – 4 April 2027 28	Union Berlin	v	Mainz 05
		Report

9–11 April 2027 29	Mainz 05	v	RB Leipzig	Mainz
--:-- CEST (UTC+2)		Report		Stadium: Mewa Arena

16 – 18 April 2027 30	SC Freiburg	v	Mainz 05
		Report

24 April 2027 31	1. FC Köln	v	Mainz 05	Cologne
		Report		Stadium: RheinEnergieStadion

7–9 May 2027 32	Mainz 05	v	Borussia Dortmund	Mainz
--:-- CEST (UTC+2)		Report		Stadium: Mewa Arena

33	TSG Hoffenheim	v	Mainz 05
		Report

22 May 2027 34	Mainz 05	v	VfB Stuttgart	Mainz
15:30 CEST (UTC+2)		Report		Stadium: Mewa Arena

=== DFB-Pokal ===
23 August 2026 First round	VfB Krieschow	0–9	Mainz 05	Kolkwitz
15:30		Report	Tietz 19', 26', 32', 57'; Amiri 39', 48'; Becker 43'; Königsdörffer 73'; Böving 88'	Stadium: Sportpark Krieschow; Attendance: 4,000; Referee: Lennart Kernchen

27 October 2026 Second round	VfL Bochum	2–0	Mainz 05	Bochum
18:00	Rasmussen 46'; T. Meyer (yellow card) 66'; Hofmann 75'; L. Isbruch (yellow card) 90+6'; Klaiber (yellow card) 90+7'	Report	Königsdörffer (yellow card) 64'	Stadium: Vonovia Ruhrstadion; Attendance: 20,432; Referee: Michael Bacher
