= William Bøving =

Danish footballer (born 2003)

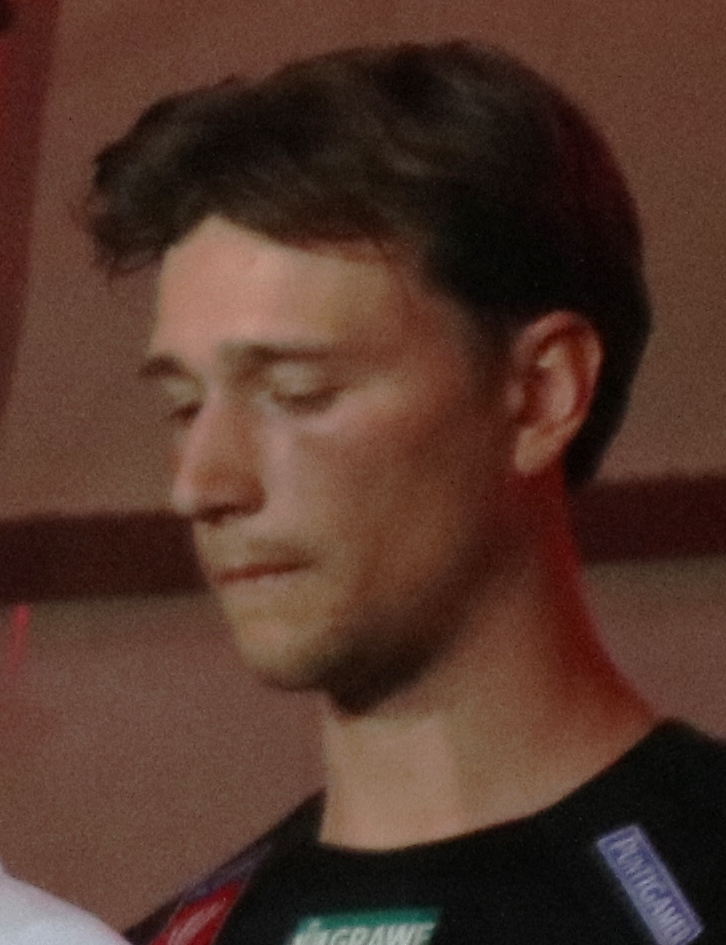
- Bøving in 2024

Personal information
- Full name: William Bøving Wick
- Date of birth: 1 March 2003 (age 23)
- Place of birth: Charlottenlund, Denmark
- Height: 1.76 m (5 ft 9 in)
- Position: Forward

Team information
- Current team: 1. FC Nürnberg; (on loan from Mainz 05)
- Number: 11

Youth career
- –2010: HIK
- 2010–2020: Copenhagen

Senior career*
Years	Team	Apps	(Gls)
2020–2022	Copenhagen	30	(2)
2022–2025	Sturm Graz	78	(14)
2025–	Mainz 05	9	(0)
2026–	→ 1. FC Nürnberg (loan)	0	(0)

International career^{‡}
2018–2019	Denmark U16	10	(5)
2019–2020	Denmark U17	12	(5)
2020	Denmark U18	2	(1)
2020	Denmark U19	1	(0)
2021–2022	Denmark U20	4	(0)
2021–2025	Denmark U21	22	(3)
- * Club domestic league appearances and goals as of 29 August 2026 ‡ National team caps and goals as of 22 June 2025

William Bøving Wick (born 1 March 2003) is a Danish professional footballer who plays as a forward for 2. Bundesliga club 1. FC Nürnberg, on loan from Mainz 05.

== Club career ==
=== Copenhagen ===
Bøving joined the FC Copenhagen youth academy, Kjøbenhavns Boldklub (KB), at the age of 10, having previously played for HIK. As a youth player, he participated in the first team's winter training camp during the 2019–20 season, featuring in all the friendly matches. He received his first call-up to the senior squad for a Danish Superliga match against Silkeborg on 23 February 2020, but did not make an appearance.

Bøving made his official debut on 4 March 2020, in a Danish Cup match against AaB, coming on as a substitute for Michael Santos in the final five minutes. Later that year, on 10 August 2020, he featured in Copenhagen's 1–0 loss to Manchester United in the UEFA Europa League quarter-finals.

He made his Superliga debut on 3 February 2021, coming on as an 85th-minute substitute in a win against AaB. After progressing through the club's youth system, Bøving was officially promoted to the first-team squad in the summer of 2021, following a contract extension on 21 May 2021 that tied him to the club until 2025. During his time with Copenhagen, he made 44 competitive appearances, including 12 in European competitions, and scored five goals.

=== Sturm Graz ===
On 30 August 2022, Bøving signed a four-year contract with Austrian Bundesliga club Sturm Graz. He made his debut for Die Schwoazn on 3 September, starting in a 0–0 home draw against TSV Hartberg. Bøving made headlines in October 2022 during a UEFA Europa League match against Lazio, scoring both goals in a 2–2 draw.

=== Mainz 05 ===
On 1 September 2025, Bøving signed a four-year contract with German Bundesliga club Mainz 05.

==== Loan to 1. FC Nürnberg ====
On 28 August 2026, he was loaned to 1. FC Nürnberg in the 2. Bundesliga.

== Career statistics ==
As of match played 23 August 2026

Appearances and goals by club, season and competition
Club	Season	League			National cup (Note: Includes Danish Cup, Austrian Cup)		Europe		Total	
Club	Season	Division	Apps	Goals	Apps	Goals	Apps	Goals	Apps	Goals
Copenhagen	2019–20	Danish Superliga	0	0	1	0	1 (Note: Appearances in UEFA Europa League)	0	2	0
Copenhagen	2020–21	Danish Superliga	1	0	0	0	0	0	1	0
Copenhagen	2021–22	Danish Superliga	26	2	1	0	10 (Note: Appearances in UEFA Conference League)	3	37	5
Copenhagen	2022–23	Danish Superliga	3	0	0	0	1 (Note: Appearance in UEFA Champions League)	0	4	0
Copenhagen	Total		30	2	2	0	12	3	44	5
Sturm Graz	2022–23	Austrian Bundesliga	17	1	1	0	6	2	24	3
Sturm Graz	2023–24	Austrian Bundesliga	28	2	5	2	12 (Note: Two appearances and one goal in UEFA Champions League, six appearances and two goals in UEFA Europa League, four appearances in UEFA Conference League)	3	45	7
Sturm Graz	2024–25	Austrian Bundesliga	30	11	4	0	8	0	42	12
Sturm Graz	2025–26	Austrian Bundesliga	3	0	0	0	2 (Note: Appearances in UEFA Champions League)	0	5	0
Sturm Graz	Total		78	14	10	2	28	5	116	21
Mainz 05	2025–26	Bundesliga	9	0	1	0	8	0	18	0
Mainz 05	2026–27	Bundesliga	0	0	1	1	—		1	1
Mainz 05	Total		9	0	2	1	8	0	19	1
Career total			117	16	14	3	48	8	179	27

== Honours ==
Copenhagen

- Danish Superliga: 2021–22

Sturm Graz

- Austrian Bundesliga: 2023–24, 2024–25
- Austrian Cup: 2022–23
