= Lasse Rieß =

German footballer (born 2001)

Personal information
- Full name: Lasse Finn Rieß
- Date of birth: 27 July 2001 (age 25)
- Place of birth: Münster, Germany
- Height: 1.91 m (6 ft 3 in)
- Position: Goalkeeper

Team information
- Current team: Fortuna Düsseldorf (on loan from Mainz 05)
- Number: 1

Youth career
- –2012: FSV Nieder-Olm
- 2012–2020: Mainz 05

Senior career*
Years	Team	Apps	(Gls)
2020–	Mainz 05 II	78	(0)
2022–	Mainz 05	6	(0)
2026–	→ Fortuna Düsseldorf (loan)	0	(0)
- * Club domestic league appearances and goals as of 16 May 2026

Lasse Finn Rieß (born 27 July 2001) is a German professional footballer who plays as a goalkeeper for 3. Liga club Fortuna Düsseldorf, on loan from Mainz 05.

== Early life ==
Rieß was born on 27 July 2001 in Münster, Germany to Jens Rieß and is a native of Nieder-Olm, Germany. Growing up, attended IGS Mainz-Bretzenheim in Germany.

== Career ==
As a youth player, Rieß joined the youth academy of FSV Nieder-Olm, where he played as a forward. At the age of ten, he joined the youth academy of Bundesliga side 1. FSV Mainz 05 and was promoted to the club's reserve team in 2020. In 2022, he was promoted to their senior team. On 4 May 2025, he debuted for them during a 1–1 home draw with Eintracht Frankfurt in the league.

On 6 July 2026, Rieß joined 3. Liga club Fortuna Düsseldorf on loan for the 2026–27 season.

== Style of play ==
Rieß plays as a goalkeeper and is right-footed. German newspaper Allgemeine Zeitung wrote in 2025 that "Rieß's qualities on the ball are what distinguish him from other professional goalkeepers".

== Career statistics ==
As of match played 30 November 2025

Appearances and goals by club, season and competition
Club	Season	League			Cup		Europe		Total	
Club	Season	Division	Apps	Goals	Apps	Goals	Apps	Goals	Apps	Goals
Mainz 05 II	2020–21	Regionalliga Südwest	21	0	—		—		21	0
Mainz 05 II	2021–22	Regionalliga Südwest	26	0	—		—		26	0
Mainz 05 II	2022–23	Regionalliga Südwest	19	0	—		—		19	0
Mainz 05 II	2023–24	Regionalliga Südwest	8	0	—		—		8	0
Mainz 05 II	2024–25	Regionalliga Südwest	3	0	—		—		3	0
Mainz 05 II	Total		77	0	—		—		77	0
Mainz 05	2021–22	Bundesliga	0	0	0	0	—		0	0
Mainz 05	2022–23	Bundesliga	0	0	0	0	—		0	0
Mainz 05	2023–24	Bundesliga	0	0	0	0	—		0	0
Mainz 05	2024–25	Bundesliga	2	0	—		—		2	0
Mainz 05	2025–26	Bundesliga	4	0	0	0	1 (Note: Appearance in UEFA Conference League)	0	5	0
Mainz 05	Total		6	0	0	0	1	0	7	0
Career total			83	0	0	0	1	0	84	0
