= Anthony Caci =

French association football player (born 1997)

Personal information
- Full name: Anthony Caci
- Date of birth: 1 July 1997 (age 29)
- Place of birth: Forbach, France
- Height: 1.84 m (6 ft 0 in)
- Positions: Left-back; left wing-back

Team information
- Current team: Mainz 05
- Number: 19

Youth career
- 2003–2004: SO Merlebach
- 2004–2008: ES Petite-Rosselle
- 2008–2009: Étoile Naborienne
- 2009–2011: SG Marienau
- 2011–2016: Strasbourg

Senior career*
Years	Team	Apps	(Gls)
2015–2020	Strasbourg B	54	(8)
2016–2022	Strasbourg	108	(2)
2022–	Mainz 05	113	(8)

International career
2019	France U21	2	(0)
2021	France Olympic	4	(0)
- * Club domestic league appearances and goals as of 30 October 2026

Anthony Caci (born 1 July 1997) is a French professional footballer who plays as a left-back or left wing-back for German club Mainz 05.

== Career ==
In January 2022, it was announced Caci would leave RC Strasbourg for Bundesliga side Mainz 05 in summer 2022, having agreed a contract until 2026.

On April 6th 2025, Telesport reported that he was being viewed by Albania’s coach Sylvinho for a possible call-up due to his Albanian origins.

== Career statistics ==
As of match played 30 October 2026

Appearances and goals by club, season and competition
Club	Season	League			National Cup		League Cup		Europe		Other		Total	
Club	Season	League	Apps	Goals	Apps	Goals	Apps	Goals	Apps	Goals	Apps	Goals	Apps	Goals
Strasbourg B	2015–16	Championnat National 3	9	2	—		—		—		—		9	2
Strasbourg B	2016–17	Championnat National 3	22	2	—		—		—		—		22	2
Strasbourg B	2017–18	Championnat National 3	21	4	—		—		—		—		21	4
Strasbourg B	2018–19	Championnat National 3	1	0	—		—		—		—		1	0
Strasbourg B	2019–20	Championnat National 3	1	0	—		—		—		—		1	0
Strasbourg B	Total		54	8	0	0	0	0	0	0	0	0	54	8
Strasbourg	2016–17	Ligue 2	1	0	1	0	1	0	—		—		3	0
Strasbourg	2017–18	Ligue 1	0	0	0	0	0	0	—		—		0	0
Strasbourg	2018–19	Ligue 1	29	0	0	0	5	0	—		—		34	0
Strasbourg	2019–20	Ligue 1	8	1	1	0	1	0	—		—		10	1
Strasbourg	2020–21	Ligue 1	33	0	0	0	0	0	—		—		33	0
Strasbourg	2021–22	Ligue 1	37	1	1	0	0	0	—		—		38	1
Strasbourg	Total		108	2	3	0	7	0	0	0	0	0	118	2
Mainz 05	2022–23	Bundesliga	31	2	2	0	—		—		—		33	2
Mainz 05	2023–24	Bundesliga	31	2	2	0	—		—		—		33	2
Mainz 05	2024–25	Bundesliga	33	1	2	0	—		—		—		35	1
Mainz 05	2025–26	Bundesliga	10	0	0	0	—		2 (Note: Appearances in UEFA Conference League)	0	—		12	0
Mainz 05	2026–27	Bundesliga	8	3	2	0	—		—		—		10	3
Mainz 05	Total		113	8	8	0	—		2	0	—		123	8
Career total			275	18	11	0	7	0	2	0	0	0	295	18
