= Danny da Costa =

German footballer

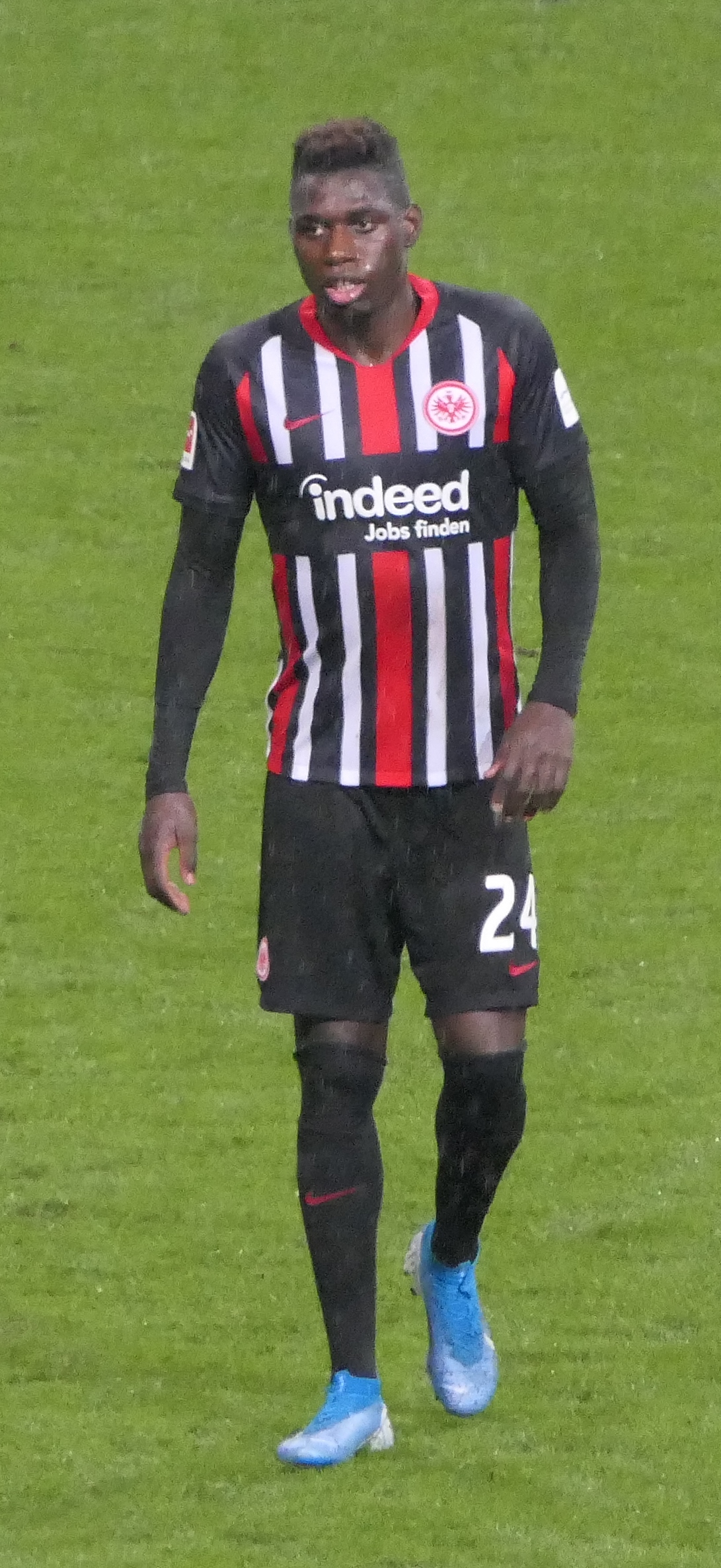
- Da Costa with Eintracht Frankfurt in 2019

Personal information
- Full name: Danny Vieira da Costa
- Date of birth: 13 July 1993 (age 33)
- Place of birth: Neuss, Germany
- Height: 1.87 m (6 ft 2 in)
- Positions: Right back; right wing-back

Team information
- Current team: Mainz 05
- Number: 21

Youth career
- 1999–2001: Winfriedia Mülheim
- 2001–2010: Bayer Leverkusen

Senior career*
Years	Team	Apps	(Gls)
2011–2012	Bayer Leverkusen	6	(0)
2011–2012	Bayer Leverkusen II	2	(0)
2012–2016	FC Ingolstadt	86	(0)
2015	FC Ingolstadt II	2	(0)
2016–2017	Bayer Leverkusen	3	(0)
2017–2022	Eintracht Frankfurt	129	(9)
2021	→ Mainz 05 (loan)	16	(0)
2022–	Mainz 05	108	(3)

International career
2009–2010	Germany U17	11	(1)
2010–2011	Germany U18	6	(0)
2011–2012	Germany U19	6	(0)
2012–2013	Germany U20	6	(0)
2013–2014	Germany U21	5	(1)
- * Club domestic league appearances and goals as of 30 October 2026

Danny Vieira da Costa (born 13 July 1993) is a German professional footballer who plays as a right back or right wing-back for Bundesliga club Mainz 05.

== Club career ==
=== Early career ===
With his club having already advanced to the knockout stage of the Europa League, the 17-year-old da Costa made his Leverkusen debut as a second-half substitute against Atlético Madrid, coming on for Gonzalo Castro. da Costa made his Bundesliga debut on 24 September 2011, facing off against Bayern Munich and the manager who gave him his debut, Jupp Heynckes. da Costa would go on to make 6 appearances in the Bundesliga, as well as one in the Champions League, coming against Barcelona in the first round of the knockout stage..

=== FC Ingolstadt ===
In the offseason, da Costa secured a move to 2. Bundesliga side FC Ingolstadt, initially on a two-year loan. da Costa made his club debut on 3 August 2012 against Energie Cottbus, and started the first two games of the season at right-back before being supplanted by Andreas Görlitz. da Costa made his return on match day 7, coming on as a substitute against 1860 Munich. This led to a run of 13 consecutive starts for Ingolstadt, and da Costa finished the season having started 26 of their 34 games with his club finishing in the middle of the table. da Costa also made 26 starts in the 2013–14 season.

On 31 October 2014, in a match between the table leaders at the time, Ingolstadt and Fortuna Düsseldorf, da Costa suffered a leg injury in a collision with Lukas Schmitz, and had to be stretchered off. The injury was severe − a fractured tibia − and put his career in jeopardy. da Costa made his competitive return in the DFB-Pokal against Unterhaching on 9 August 2015 in advance of Ingolstadt's first ever season in the Bundesliga. da Costa appeared in the Bundesliga for the first time with Ingolstadt on 25 September, coming on as a late substitute in the 1–1 draw.

He would make two more substitute appearances before earning his first start in the final match of the Hinrunde, a 1–0 loss to former club Bayer Leverkusen. da Costa started all but one match in the second half, as Ingolstadt survived their first season in 10th position. With three matches left in the season, football magazine kicker reported that Leverkusen would be exercising a buy back option on da Costa. The news came days after the club announced that manager Ralph Hasenhüttl would not be returning, with Hasenhüttl eventually moving on to newly promoted side RB Leipzig.

=== Return to Leverkusen ===
On 2 May 2016, da Costa officially returned to former club Bayer Leverkusen, with the move becoming effective 1 July. da Costa was in and out of the squad during his lone season back with Leverkusen, making just three appearances in the Bundesliga. His lone start came against former club Ingolstadt, but he was substituted off at the half in favor of Wendell. da Costa also made one appearance in Leverkusen's Champions League campaign, coming in the final day of the group stage against AS Monaco. He was one of seven changes from Leverkusen's previous Champions League tie, as they had already advanced to the knockout stage.

=== Eintracht Frankfurt ===
At the end of the 2016-17 season, da Costa signed for Eintracht Frankfurt. da Costa sustained an injury in training prior to the fourth match day, a partial tendon tear which caused him to miss around three months of the season.

He made his return in their 2–1 cup victory over Heidenheim, coming on in extra time to provide the assist on Sébastien Haller's winner. Initially behind Timothy Chandler on the depth chart at right back, da Costa played his way into manager Niko Kovač's plans as he started the final 13 games of the season. Kovač lined da Costa up on the right and Chandler on the left, with fellow right-back contender Marius Wolf in the midfield.

On 3 March, da Costa scored his first senior goal, the only goal in a victory over Hannover. da Costa featured in Eintracht's team that won the 2017–18 DFB-Pokal against Bayern Munich, playing the forward ball that found Ante Rebić for the winner. The trophy was the club's first since 1988.

da Costa began the 2018–19 season in good form, starting every match of the season at right-back under new manager Adi Hütter. Hütter sought to implement a pressing style, one da Costa was familiar with from his time at Leverkusen under Roger Schmidt. On 4 October, da Costa scored the first and final goals in Eintracht's 4–1 win over Italian side Lazio in the Europa League.

==== Loan to Mainz 05 ====
On 22 January 2021, da Costa moved to Mainz 05, on a loan until the end of the season.

=== Return to Mainz ===
On 29 April 2022, Mainz 05 announced the return of da Costa on a three-year contract, beginning on 1 July 2022.

== International career ==
Da Costa has represented Germany at U17 making 11 appearances, U18 making six appearances and currently six appearances at U19 level. In July 2014 he was asked to switch his international allegiance to Angola.

After missing the 2015 UEFA European Under-21 Championship due to injury, da Costa was included in the provisional squad for the 2016 Summer Olympics in Rio de Janeiro. However, da Costa did not make the final squad as Germany finished runners-up in the competition.

== Career statistics ==
As of match played 30 October 2026

Appearances and goals by club, season and competition
Club	Season	League			DFB-Pokal		Europe		Other		Total	
Club	Season	Division	Apps	Goals	Apps	Goals	Apps	Goals	Apps	Goals	Apps	Goals
Bayer Leverkusen	2010–11	Bundesliga	0	0	0	0	2 (Note: Appearances in UEFA Europa League)	0	—		2	0
Bayer Leverkusen	2011–12	Bundesliga	6	0	0	0	1 (Note: Appearance in UEFA Champions League)	0	—		7	0
Bayer Leverkusen	Total		6	0	0	0	3	0	—		9	0
FC Ingolstadt	2012–13	2. Bundesliga	27	0	1	0	—		—		28	0
FC Ingolstadt	2013–14	2. Bundesliga	27	0	3	0	—		—		30	0
FC Ingolstadt	2014–15	2. Bundesliga	12	0	1	0	—		—		13	0
FC Ingolstadt	2015–16	Bundesliga	20	0	1	0	—		—		21	0
FC Ingolstadt	Total		86	0	6	0	—		—		92	0
Bayer Leverkusen	2016–17	Bundesliga	3	0	0	0	1	0	—		4	0
Eintracht Frankfurt	2017–18	Bundesliga	17	1	4	0	—		—		21	1
Eintracht Frankfurt	2018–19	Bundesliga	34	2	1	0	14	2	1 (Note: Appearance in DFL-Supercup)	0	50	4
Eintracht Frankfurt	2019–20	Bundesliga	19	1	4	1	14	2	—		37	4
Eintracht Frankfurt	2020–21	Bundesliga	6	0	1	0	—		—		7	0
Eintracht Frankfurt	2021–22	Bundesliga	11	0	1	0	2	0	—		14	0
Eintracht Frankfurt	Total		87	4	11	1	30	4	1	0	129	9
Mainz 05 (loan)	2020–21	Bundesliga	16	0	—		—		—		16	0
Mainz 05	2022–23	Bundesliga	23	0	2	0	—		—		25	0
Mainz 05	2023–24	Bundesliga	19	0	2	0	—		—		21	0
Mainz 05	2024–25	Bundesliga	25	0	0	0	—		—		25	0
Mainz 05	2025–26	Bundesliga	34	2	1	0	9 (Note: Appearances in UEFA Conference League)	0	—		44	2
Mainz 05	2026–27	Bundesliga	8	1	2	0	—		—		10	1
Mainz 05	Total		108	3	7	0	9	0	—		124	3
Career total			307	7	23	1	43	4	1	0	375	12

== Personal life ==
Da Costa is the son of an Angolan father and a Congolese mother, he lives with his family in Leverkusen district Opladen.

== Honours ==
=== Club ===
Eintracht Frankfurt

- DFB-Pokal: 2017–18
- UEFA Europa League: 2021–22

=== Individual ===
- UEFA Europa League Squad of the Season: 2018–19
- Bundesliga Team of the Season: 2018–19
