= Paul Nebel =

German footballer

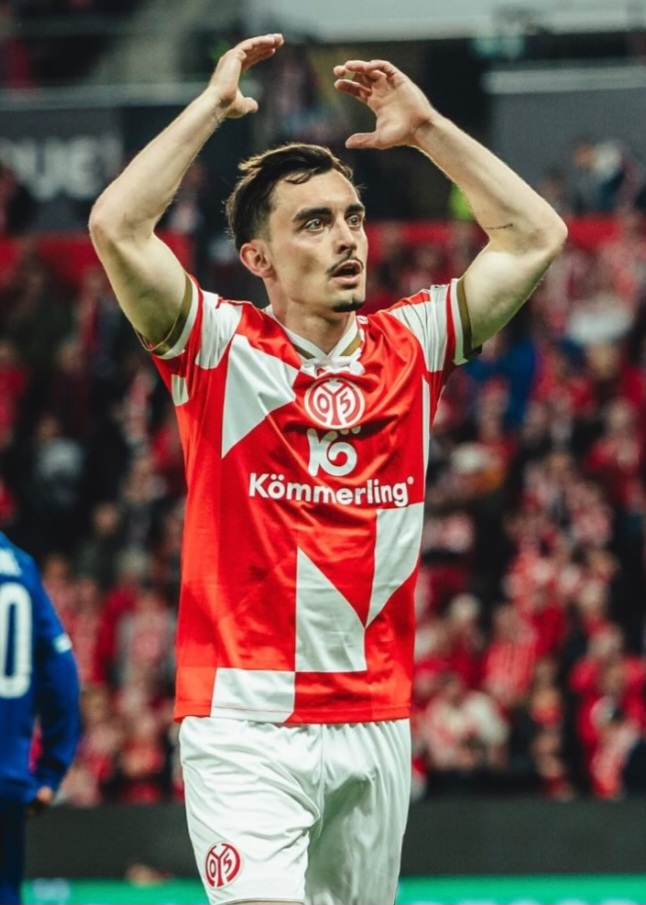
- Paul Nebel with Mainz 05 in 2026

Personal information
- Date of birth: 10 October 2002 (age 24)
- Place of birth: Bad Nauheim, Germany
- Height: 1.69 m (5 ft 7 in)
- Positions: Attacking midfielder; winger

Team information
- Current team: Mainz 05
- Number: 8

Youth career
- –2012: SC Germania Nieder-Mockstadt
- 2012–2013: KSV Klein-Karben
- 2014–2016: Kickers Offenbach
- 2016–2020: Mainz 05

Senior career*
Years	Team	Apps	(Gls)
2020–2022	Mainz 05 II	34	(7)
2020–	Mainz 05	78	(15)
2022–2024	→ Karlsruher SC (loan)	65	(9)

International career^{‡}
2017	Germany U15	1	(0)
2017–2018	Germany U16	10	(0)
2018–2019	Germany U17	10	(3)
2020	Germany U19	1	(0)
2021–2023	Germany U20	14	(3)
2023–2025	Germany U21	14	(2)
Medal record
Men's football
Representing Germany
UEFA European Under-21 Championship
Runner-up	2025 Slovakia
- * Club domestic league appearances and goals as of 22:30, 30 October 2026 (UTC) ‡ National team caps and goals as of 10:15, 29 June 2025 (UTC)

Paul Nebel (German pronunciation: [paʊ̯l ˈneːbl̩]; born 10 October 2002) is a German professional footballer who plays as an attacking midfielder or winger for Bundesliga club Mainz 05.

== Club career ==
=== Professional debut ===
Nebel made his debut for Mainz 05 in the first round of the 2020–21 DFB-Pokal on 11 September 2020, coming on as a substitute in the 60th minute for Levin Öztunalı against fourth-division side TSV Havelse. He assisted Jean-Philippe Mateta's 90th minute goal helping to complete a hat-trick, with the match finishing as a 5–1 win. He made his Bundesliga debut the following week on 20 September, coming on as a substitute for Mateta in the 90+1st minute of Mainz's away match against RB Leipzig, which finished as a 3–1 loss.

=== Loan and breakthrough ===
After a successful two-year-long loan spell at Karlsruher SC in the German second division, Nebel became a key-player for Mainz, registering ten goals and six assists in the 2024–25 season. He finished sixth with Mainz, qualifying for the UEFA Conference League play-offs.

=== 2025–26 ===
On 20 September 2025, he'd score his first goal of the 2025–26 Bundesliga season in a 4–1 win over FC Augsburg. After a five month long goal and assist drought, he'd register his first assist of the season in a 1–1 draw against Bayer Leverkusen, on 28 February 2026. His assist opened the door to a run of strong performances, scoring a goal against Werder Bremen, a brace against Eintracht Frankfurt a week later, and assisting in the Conference League round of 16 and quarter-final against Sigma Olomouc and RC Strasbourg in two 2–0 victories. On 25 April, Nebel scored in a 3–4 loss to Bayern Munich.

== International career ==
Nebel is a youth international for Germany and is eligible to represent the Republic of Ireland under FIFA's grandparent rule through his maternal grandmother.

He made his debut for the Germany under-21 side in 2023 and would take part at the under-21 Euros in 2025, finishing runner-up. Scoring two goals in the tournament, he assisted his fellow Mainz teammate Nelson Weiper in the final and scored a longe range goal himself, carrying his team to extra-time against England, in a 2–3 loss.

Two months later, in August 2025, Nebel earned his first call-up to the German senior national team, with coach Julian Nagelsmann selecting him for the World Cup 2026 qualifiers, though he remained unused.

== Playing style ==
Technically gifted, Nebel is two-footed and primarily plays as an attacking midfielder, able to play centrally and wide. His strengths are his dribbling, speed, crosses, volleys and powerful shots, which also enables him to play as a winger. Referred to as 'Der Wirbelwind' (whirlwind in English) by some due to his short physique, he is known for his high workrate, also helping his team defensively, which has, on the other hand, also led to three red cards in 2025, setting a record.

== Personal life ==
Nebel was born in Bad Nauheim in the state of Hesse. His father Marco Nebel is a football coach himself, having been his first coach. His mother Gitti Nebel is half Irish. Nebel's maternal grandmother is from Galway, Ireland.

== Career statistics ==
As of match played 30 October 2026

Appearances and goals by club, season and competition
Club	Season	League			DFB-Pokal		Europe		Total	
Club	Season	Division	Apps	Goals	Apps	Goals	Apps	Goals	Apps	Goals
Mainz 05 II	2020–21	Regionalliga Südwest	21	4	—		—		21	4
Mainz 05 II	2021–22	Regionalliga Südwest	13	3	—		—		13	3
Mainz 05 II	Total		34	7	—		—		34	7
Mainz 05	2020–21	Bundesliga	4	0	1	0	—		5	0
Mainz 05	2021–22	Bundesliga	10	0	1	0	—		11	0
Mainz 05	2024–25	Bundesliga	31	10	2	0	—		33	10
Mainz 05	2025–26	Bundesliga	30	5	2	0	10 (Note: Appearances in UEFA Conference League)	0	42	5
Mainz 05	2026–27	Bundesliga	3	0	1	0	—		4	0
Mainz 05	Total		78	15	7	0	10	0	95	15
Karlsruher SC (loan)	2022–23	2. Bundesliga	32	4	2	0	—		34	4
Karlsruher SC (loan)	2023–24	2. Bundesliga	33	5	1	0	—		34	5
Karlsruher SC (loan)	Total		65	9	3	0	—		68	9
Career total			177	31	10	0	10	0	197	31

== Honours ==
Germany U21

- UEFA European Under-21 Championship runner-up: 2025
