= Phillipp Mwene =

Austrian footballer

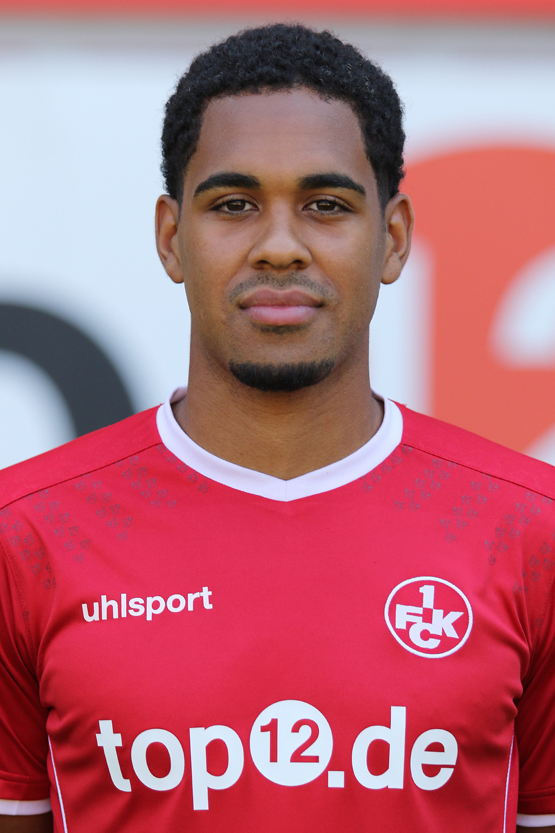
- Mwene with 1. FC Kaiserslautern in 2017

Personal information
- Date of birth: 29 January 1994 (age 32)
- Place of birth: Vienna, Austria
- Height: 1.70 m (5 ft 7 in)
- Position: Full-back

Team information
- Current team: Mainz 05
- Number: 2

Youth career
- 2002–2010: Austria Wien
- 2010–2013: VfB Stuttgart

Senior career*
Years	Team	Apps	(Gls)
2013–2016	VfB Stuttgart II	73	(0)
2016–2018	1. FC Kaiserslautern	65	(4)
2018–2021	Mainz 05	30	(1)
2021–2023	PSV	44	(3)
2023–	Mainz 05	92	(4)

International career^{‡}
2012–2013	Austria U19	4	(0)
2014–2016	Austria U21	16	(0)
2021–	Austria	36	(1)
- * Club domestic league appearances and goals as of 30 October 2026 ‡ National team caps and goals as of 17 November 2026

Phillipp Mwene (born 29 January 1994) is an Austrian professional footballer who plays as a full-back for Bundesliga club Mainz 05 and the Austria national team.

== Club career ==
=== VfB Stuttgart II ===
He made his first appearance for VfB Stuttgart II on 20 April 2013 in the 3. Liga against SV Wacker Burghausen.

=== 1. FC Kaiserslautern ===
In 2016, Mwene signed with 1. FC Kaiserslautern. In the 2017–18 season he was a consistent performer at right-back contributing 4 goals and 7 assists in 31 appearances while the club was relegated from the 2. Bundesliga.

=== Mainz 05 ===
In May 2018, Bundesliga side Mainz 05 announced Mwene would join the club on a free transfer from Kaiserslautern for the 2018–19 season.

=== PSV ===
On 27 May 2021, PSV announced Mwene would join the club on a free transfer from Mainz 05, effective from 1 July.

=== Return to Mainz 05 ===
On 23 August 2023, Mwene returned to Mainz 05 with a three-year contract.

== International career ==
Mwene was born in Vienna and holds dual citizenship of Kenya and Austria. He is a youth international for Austria. He was called up to the preliminary Austria squad for UEFA Euro 2020.

He made his debut for the Austria national football team on 4 September 2021 in a World Cup qualifier against Israel, a 2–5 away loss. He started the game and played the whole match.

On 18 May 2026, Mwene was selected in Ralf Rangnick’s 26-man squad for the 2026 FIFA World Cup, marking Austria’s first appearance in the tournament since 1998.

== Career statistics ==
=== Club ===
As of match played 30 October 2026

Appearances and goals by club, season and competition
Club	Season	League			National cup (Note: Includes DFB-Pokal, KNVB Cup)		Europe		Other		Total	
Club	Season	Division	Apps	Goals	Apps	Goals	Apps	Goals	Apps	Goals	Apps	Goals
1. FC Kaiserslautern	2016–17	2. Bundesliga	34	0	1	0	—		—		35	0
1. FC Kaiserslautern	2017–18	2. Bundesliga	31	4	2	0	—		—		33	4
1. FC Kaiserslautern	Total		65	4	3	0	—		—		68	4
Mainz 05	2018–19	Bundesliga	6	0	1	1	—		—		7	1
Mainz 05	2019–20	Bundesliga	4	0	0	0	—		—		4	0
Mainz 05	2020–21	Bundesliga	20	1	0	0	—		—		20	1
Mainz 05	Total		30	1	1	1	—		—		31	2
PSV Eindhoven	2021–22	Eredivisie	19	3	3	0	12 (Note: Five appearances in UEFA Europa League, six appearances in UEFA Europa League, one appearance in UEFA Europa Conference League)	0	0	0	34	3
PSV Eindhoven	2022–23	Eredivisie	25	0	3	0	10 (Note: Three appearances in UEFA Champions League, seven appearances in UEFA Europa League)	0	0	0	38	0
PSV Eindhoven	Total		44	3	6	0	22	0	0	0	72	3
Mainz 05	2023–24	Bundesliga	23	1	0	0	—		—		23	1
Mainz 05	2024–25	Bundesliga	32	1	2	0	—		—		34	1
Mainz 05	2025–26	Bundesliga	29	1	1	0	7 (Note: Appearances in UEFA Conference League)	0	—		37	1
Mainz 05	2026–27	Bundesliga	8	1	2	0	—		—		10	1
Mainz 05	Total		92	4	5	0	7	0	—		104	4
Career total			231	12	15	1	29	0	0	0	275	13

=== International ===
As of match played 17 November 2026

Appearances and goals by national team and year
National team	Year	Apps	Goals
Austria	2021	1	0
Austria	2022	2	0
Austria	2023	6	0
Austria	2024	11	0
Austria	2025	7	0
Austria	2026	9	1
Total		36	1

Scores and results list Austria's goal tally first, score column indicates score after each Mwene goal.

List of international goals scored by Phillipp Mwene
No.	Date	Venue	Opponent	Score	Result	Competition
1	24 September 2026	Raiffeisen Arena, Linz, Austria	Israel	2–1	3–1	2026–27 UEFA Nations League B

== Honours ==
PSV

- KNVB Cup: 2021–22, 2022–23
- Johan Cruyff Shield: 2021, 2022, 2023

Individual

- Eredivisie Team of the Month: December 2021
