= Dominik Kohr =

German footballer

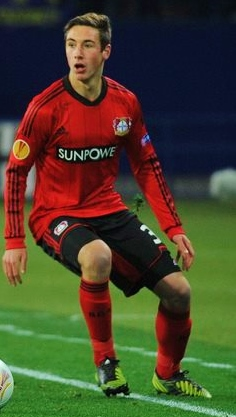
- Kohr playing for Bayer Leverkusen in 2012

Personal information
- Date of birth: 31 January 1994 (age 32)
- Place of birth: Trier, Germany
- Height: 1.83 m (6 ft 0 in)
- Positions: Defensive midfielder; centre-back

Team information
- Current team: Mainz 05
- Number: 31

Youth career
- 2000–2008: TuS Issel
- 2008–2012: Bayer Leverkusen

Senior career*
| Years | Team | Apps | (Gls) |
| 2012–2013 | Bayer Leverkusen II | 33 | (2) |
| 2012–2015 | Bayer Leverkusen | 8 | (0) |
| 2014–2015 | → FC Augsburg (loan) | 34 | (1) |
| 2015–2017 | FC Augsburg | 57 | (2) |
| 2017–2019 | Bayer Leverkusen | 46 | (1) |
| 2019–2022 | Eintracht Frankfurt | 33 | (0) |
| 2021–2022 | → Mainz 05 (loan) | 39 | (1) |
| 2022– | Mainz 05 | 119 | (7) |

International career
| 2011–2012 | Germany U18 | 8 | (0) |
| 2012–2013 | Germany U19 | 12 | (1) |
| 2013–2014 | Germany U20 | 7 | (0) |
| 2016–2017 | Germany U21 | 4 | (0) |
Medal record
Representing Germany
UEFA European Under-21 Championship
| Winner | 2017 Poland |
- * Club domestic league appearances and goals as of 29 August 2026

Dominik Kohr (born 31 January 1994) is a German professional footballer who plays as a defensive midfielder or centre-back for Bundesliga club Mainz 05.

== Career ==
=== Bayer Leverkusen ===
Kohr was part of TuS Issel before he came through Bayer Leverkusen's youth system. While progressing his football career, Kohr began playing in defence and midfield positions, unlike his father.

In January 2012, Kohr was called up to the first team for the first time in the club's winter break. After appearing as an unused substitute for several matches, Kohr made his Bundesliga debut on 21 April 2012 a 1–0 win over 1899 Hoffenheim, as a substitute for André Schürrle. He finished the 2011–12 season with two league appearances.

At the start of the 2012–13 season, Kohr remained in the club's U19 side. After being called up to the first team in late–October, he made his first appearance of the season on 4 November 2012, coming on as a late substitute, in a 3–2 win over Fortuna Düsseldorf. During the 2012–13 season, he made his European debut on 22 November 2012 in a 2–0 loss to Metalist Kharkiv. After making another European appearance, Kohr returned to the U19 side towards the end of the season, although he appeared as a substitute in the first team. Despite this, Kohr finished the 2012–13 season with four league appearances and two Europa League appearances. He also scored two goals in 27 appearances in the Regionalliga West for the reserve team.

However, at the start of the 2013–14 season, Kohr suffered a knee injury. After returning from injury, Kohr remained in and out of the first team, which led him to be leaving the club to gain first team experience. By the time of his departure, he would make two league appearances and two Champions League for Bayer Leverkusen. He also made six appearances for the reserve team in the Regionalliga West.

=== FC Augsburg ===
Kohr was loaned to FC Augsburg on 13 January 2014 for two seasons, which expires on 30 June 2015. Kohr made his FC Augsburg debut on 1 February 2014, coming on as a late substitute, in a 3–1 win over Werder Bremen. Despite finding himself in a competition with Jan Morávek for the rest of the season. he made eight appearances in the Bundesliga and 10 overall between Bayer Leverkusen and Augsburg during the 2013–14 season.

In the 2014–15 season, Kohr began a first team regular for the side, playing in the central–midfield position. He continued to remain in competition with Markus Feulner and later with Pierre-Emile Højbjerg over the midfield position, which saw him on the substitute bench in number of matches throughout the season. In addition, he also played in the right–back three times this season, as well as, playing in different position. Whilst on loan, Kohr played twice this season against his parent club, Bayer Leverkusen.

On 7 March 2015, he scored his from the penalty spot in a 1–0 against VfL Wolfsburg. This was his first Bundesliga goal. This was his only goal in 26 league appearances in the 2014–15 season. He also made an appearance in the German Cup.

The loan was made permanent on 18 June 2015. Kohr started the 2015–16 season with getting yellow cards in the first two matchdays of the Bundesliga. Despite this, he continued to be in the first team regular for the side and appeared in every match since the start of the season until his suspension in December 2015. Although he was sidelined on two occasions later in the season, the club managed to avoid relegation in the Bundesliga and finished the first full season, making the total of 39 appearances.

In the 2016–17 season, Kohr started the season well when he set up a goal for Raúl Bobadilla, who scored the second goal in the game, in a 2–0 win over FV Ravensburg in the first round of the DFB–Pokal. He then appeared in the first three league matches of the season until he suffered a leg injury following a foul from José Rodríguez Martínez, in a 3–1 loss against 1. FSV Mainz 05 on 18 September 2016. After returning from injury, it was not until on 28 January 2017 when he scored his first goal for the club for over a year, in a 2–1 win over VfL Wolfsburg.

He scored again on 17 February 2017, in a 3–1 loss against Bayer 04 Leverkusen. Throughout the season, Kohr's disciplinary issues resulted him being on sidelined on three occasions, including a sending off against Hamburger SV on 10 December 2016. Despite this, Kohr continued to remain in the first team for the rest of the season and played in either central midfielder and defensive midfielder. He later finished the 2016–17 season, making the total of 28 appearances and scoring two times in all competitions.

=== Return to Leverkusen ===
It was announced on 13 April 2017 that Kohr had rejoined Leverkusen, effectively moving on 1 July 2017. The move came after when the club used a buy-back clause to sign him on a deal lasting until 2020.

Kohr made his return on 11 August, scoring in extra time in a 3–0 win over Karlsruher SC in the first round of the DFB-Pokal. Since returning to Bayer 04 Leverkusen, he quickly established himself in the first team, playing in the midfield position. It was not until on 18 November 2017 when he scored his first league goal for the club in his second spell, in a 2–2 draw against RB Leipzig.

=== Eintracht Frankfurt ===
On 3 July 2019, Kohr joined Eintracht Frankfurt on a five-year deal.

=== Mainz 05 ===
On 18 January 2021, Kohr joined Mainz 05 on loan until the end of the season. The loan was extended for the 2021–22 season in May 2021. On 12 May 2022, Kohr agreed to move to Mainz 05 on a permanent basis and signed a four-year contract with the club.

== International career ==
After representing Germany U18 side, Kohr was called up by Germany U19 for the first time and made his Germany U21 debut on 14 August 2012, starting the whole game, in a 1–0 win over Scotland U19. Kohr then scored his first Germany U19 goal, as well as, setting up one of the goals, in a 5–0 win over Macedonia U19 on 11 October 2012. For the next two years, Kohr finished third place in both U18 and U19 awards for Fritz Walter Medaille. Kohr went on to make 12 appearances for the U19 side, where he mostly played in the right–back position.

Later in October 2013, Kohr was called up by Germany U20 for the first time. He made his Germany U20 debut on 12 October 2013, starting the whole game, in a 4–0 win over Netherlands U20. After making 5 more appearances for the U20 side, Kohr appeared 2 times in October 2014, adding his tally appearance to 7.

In August 2016, Kohr was called up by Germany U21 for the first time. This came after when he didn't make it to the squad for the Olympics. He made his Germany U21 debut on 2 September 2016, where he played 45 minutes, in a 3–0 win over Slovakia U21. After eight months away, Kohr was called up to the Germany U21 squad for the UEFA European Under-21 Championship and played two times (both as a substitute), as Germany U21 went on to win the tournament.

== Career statistics ==
As of match played 29 August 2026

| Club | Season | League | | | Cup | | Continental | | Total | | Ref. |
| Club | Season | Division | Apps | Goals | Apps | Goals | Apps | Goals | Apps | Goals | Ref. |
|---|---|---|---|---|---|---|---|---|---|---|---|
| Bayer Leverkusen | 2011–12 | Bundesliga | 2 | 0 | 0 | 0 | 0 | 0 | 2 | 0 | |
| Bayer Leverkusen | 2012–13 | Bundesliga | 4 | 0 | 0 | 0 | 2 (Note: Appearances in the UEFA Europa League.) | 0 | 6 | 0 | |
| Bayer Leverkusen | 2013–14 | Bundesliga | 2 | 0 | 0 | 0 | 2 (Note: Appearances in the UEFA Champions League.) | 0 | 4 | 0 | |
| Bayer Leverkusen | Totals | | 8 | 0 | 0 | 0 | 4 | 0 | 12 | 0 | — |
| Bayer Leverkusen II | 2012–13 | Regionalliga West | 27 | 2 | — | | — | | 27 | 2 | |
| Bayer Leverkusen II | 2013–14 | Regionalliga West | 6 | 0 | — | | — | | 6 | 0 | |
| Bayer Leverkusen II | Totals | | 33 | 2 | — | | — | | 33 | 2 | — |
| FC Augsburg (loan) | 2013–14 | Bundesliga | 8 | 0 | 0 | 0 | — | | 8 | 0 | |
| FC Augsburg (loan) | 2014–15 | Bundesliga | 26 | 1 | 1 | 0 | — | | 27 | 1 | |
| FC Augsburg | 2015–16 | Bundesliga | 31 | 0 | 2 | 0 | 6 | 0 | 39 | 0 | |
| FC Augsburg | 2016–17 | Bundesliga | 26 | 2 | 2 | 0 | — | | 28 | 2 | |
| FC Augsburg | Totals | | 91 | 3 | 5 | 0 | 6 | 0 | 102 | 3 | — |
| Bayer Leverkusen | 2017–18 | Bundesliga | 28 | 1 | 4 | 1 | — | | 32 | 2 | |
| Bayer Leverkusen | 2018–19 | Bundesliga | 18 | 0 | 2 | 0 | 5 | 2 | 25 | 2 | |
| Bayer Leverkusen | Totals | | 46 | 1 | 6 | 1 | 5 | 2 | 57 | 4 | — |
| Eintracht Frankfurt | 2019–20 | Bundesliga | 26 | 0 | 5 | 0 | 9 | 1 | 40 | 1 | |
| Eintracht Frankfurt | 2020–21 | Bundesliga | 7 | 0 | 2 | 0 | — | | 9 | 0 | |
| Eintracht Frankfurt | Total | | 33 | 0 | 7 | 0 | 9 | 1 | 49 | 1 | |
| Mainz 05 (loan) | 2020–21 | Bundesliga | 17 | 1 | 0 | 0 | — | | 17 | 1 | |
| Mainz 05 (loan) | 2021–22 | Bundesliga | 22 | 0 | 2 | 0 | — | | 24 | 0 | |
| Mainz 05 (loan) | Total | | 39 | 1 | 2 | 0 | 0 | 0 | 41 | 1 | |
| Mainz 05 | 2022–23 | Bundesliga | 30 | 3 | 3 | 1 | — | | 33 | 4 | |
| Mainz 05 | 2023–24 | Bundesliga | 31 | 0 | 2 | 0 | — | | 33 | 0 | |
| Mainz 05 | 2024–25 | Bundesliga | 28 | 2 | 2 | 1 | — | | 30 | 3 | |
| Mainz 05 | 2025–26 | Bundesliga | 29 | 2 | 2 | 0 | 10 (Note: Appearances in UEFA Conference League) | 0 | 41 | 2 | |
| Mainz 05 | 2026–27 | Bundesliga | 1 | 0 | 1 | 0 | — | | 2 | 0 | |
| Mainz 05 | Total | | 119 | 7 | 10 | 2 | 10 | 0 | 139 | 9 | |
| Career total | | | 359 | 14 | 30 | 3 | 34 | 3 | 421 | 20 | — |

== Personal life ==
Kohr was born in Trier, Germany, the son of ex-footballer Harald Kohr. He has a sister, Karoline Kohr, who is also a footballer.

As a young boy, Kohr wanted to be a footballer and moved to Leverkusen after joining the club when he was 14. According to Kohr, he said it was difficult for his mother, quoting: "But it was important to my parents that I do not come to a boarding school but live with a family." Because of this, he decided to do an apprenticeship as a sports and fitness trainer there, which "lasts three years, because of his high school diploma he wants to shorten to two and a half years."

== Honours ==
Germany U21

- UEFA European Under-21 Championship: 2017

Individual

- Fritz Walter Medal U18 Bronze: 2012
- Fritz Walter Medal U19 Bronze: 2013
