= Stefan Posch =

Austrian footballer (born 1997)

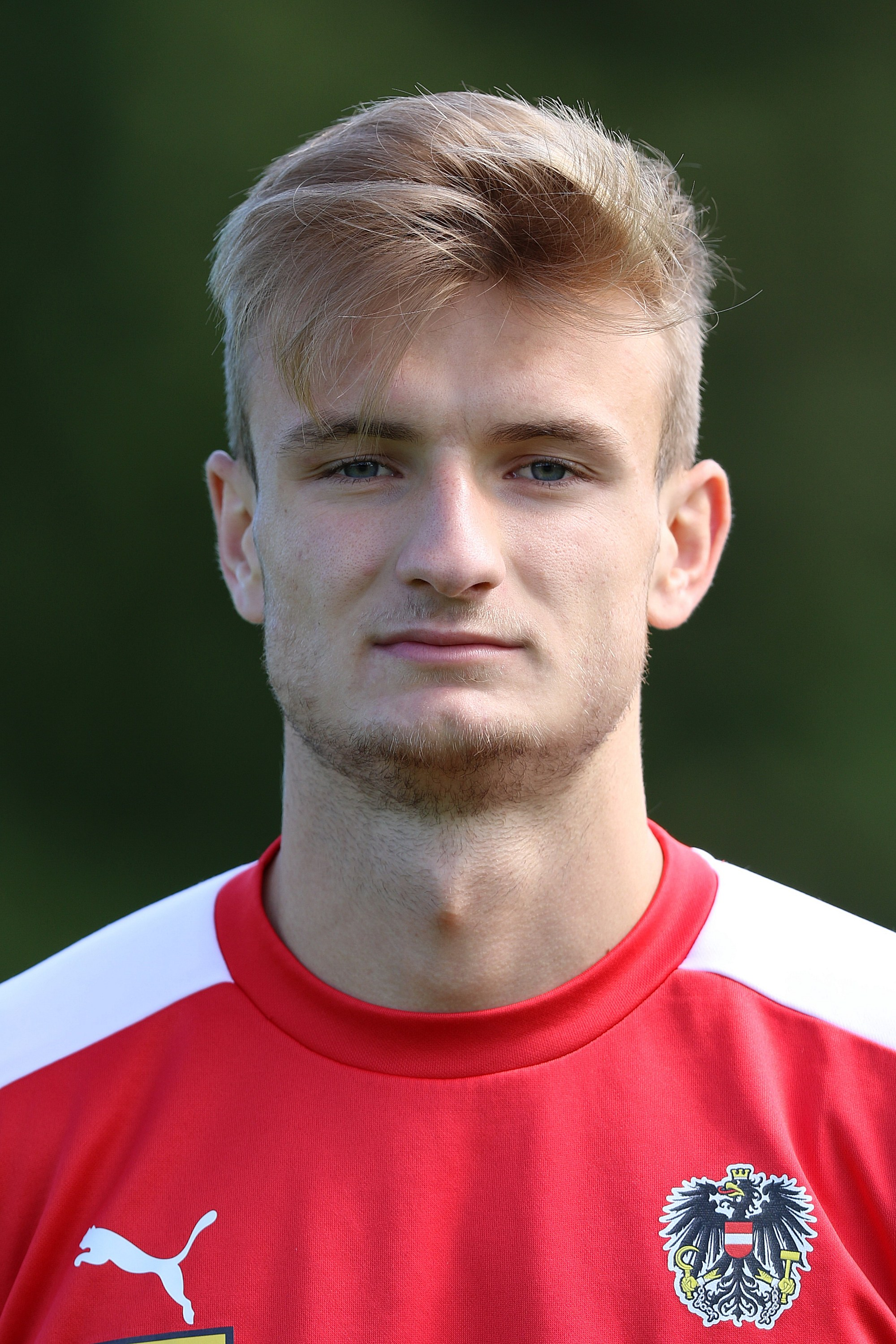
- Posch with Austria U21 in 2017

Personal information
- Date of birth: 14 May 1997 (age 29)
- Place of birth: Judenburg, Austria
- Height: 1.90 m (6 ft 3 in)
- Positions: Right-back; centre-back

Team information
- Current team: Mainz 05
- Number: 4

Youth career
- 2004–2008: Tus Kraubath
- 2008–2009: DSV Leoben
- 2009–2010: Grazer AK
- 2010: AKA HIB Liebenau
- 2010–2011: Sturm Graz
- 2011–2014: Admira Wacker
- 2015–2016: TSG Hoffenheim

Senior career*
| Years | Team | Apps | (Gls) |
| 2014–2015 | Admira Wacker Amateure | 28 | (4) |
| 2016–2018 | TSG Hoffenheim II | 38 | (3) |
| 2017–2023 | TSG Hoffenheim | 109 | (2) |
| 2022–2023 | → Bologna (loan) | 30 | (6) |
| 2023–2026 | Bologna | 45 | (1) |
| 2025 | → Atalanta (loan) | 5 | (0) |
| 2025–2026 | → Como (loan) | 14 | (1) |
| 2026 | Como | 0 | (0) |
| 2026 | → Mainz 05 (loan) | 16 | (0) |
| 2026– | Mainz 05 | 7 | (0) |

International career^{‡}
| 2012–2013 | Austria U16 | 13 | (2) |
| 2013–2014 | Austria U17 | 13 | (4) |
| 2014–2015 | Austria U18 | 6 | (1) |
| 2015–2016 | Austria U19 | 11 | (2) |
| 2017–2018 | Austria U21 | 7 | (1) |
| 2019– | Austria | 61 | (5) |
- * Club domestic league appearances and goals as of 22:30, 30 October 2026 (UTC) ‡ National team caps and goals as of 22:30, 17 November 2026 (UTC)

Stefan Posch (German pronunciation: [ˈʃtɛfa(ː)n ˈpɔʃ]; born 14 May 1997) is an Austrian footballer who plays as a right-back or centre-back for German Bundesliga club Mainz 05 and the Austria national team.

== Club career ==
Posch started his senior career at Admira Wacker Amateure in the Austrian Regionalliga, before joining the youth ranks of TSG Hoffenheim in 2015. On 28 September 2017, he made his senior debut for the first team of TSG Hoffenheim, by starting in a 2–1 away defeat against Ludogorets Razgrad in the Europa League. A year later, on 19 September 2018, he made his UEFA Champions League debut in a 2–2 away draw against Shakhtar Dontesk during the 2018–19 season. He scored his first goal for the club in a 5–0 victory over FC Köln on 15 October 2021.

On 1 September 2022, Posch joined Serie A club Bologna on loan with an option and obligation to buy. Two months later, on 6 November, he netted his first goal in a 2–1 victory over Torino. The transfer to Bologna was made permanent on 31 May 2023.

On 3 February 2025, Posch moved on loan to Atalanta, with an option to buy. On 1 September 2025, Posch joined Serie A club Como on loan with an obligation to buy. After the loan ended, Posch joined Como, and was immediately loaned to Bundesliga club Mainz 05 until the end of the season.

On 12 August 2026, he returned to Mainz 05 on a permanent basis.

== International career ==
On 10 June 2019, Posch debuted for the Austrian senior squad in a Euro 2020 qualifier against North Macedonia, as a half-time substitute for Aleksandar Dragović. Later that year, on 13 October, he scored his first international goal in a 1–0 victory over Slovenia during the same qualification. Subsequently, he was selected in the Austrian squad for the UEFA Euro 2020.

On 7 June 2024, Posch was named in the 26-man squad for the UEFA Euro 2024. On 18 May 2026, he was named in Austria's squad for the 2026 FIFA World Cup.

== Career statistics ==
=== Club ===
As of match played 30 October 2026

Appearances and goals by club, season and competition
| Club | Season | League | | | National cup (Note: Includes DFB-Pokal, Coppa Italia) | | Europe | | Total | |
| Club | Season | Division | Apps | Goals | Apps | Goals | Apps | Goals | Apps | Goals |
|---|---|---|---|---|---|---|---|---|---|---|
| Admira Wacker Amateure | 2013–14 | Austrian Regionalliga | 14 | 2 | — | | — | | 14 | 2 |
| Admira Wacker Amateure | 2014–15 | Austrian Regionalliga | 14 | 2 | — | | — | | 14 | 2 |
| Admira Wacker Amateure | Total | | 28 | 4 | — | | — | | 28 | 4 |
| TSG Hoffenheim II | 2015–16 | Under 19 Bundesliga | 22 | 2 | — | | — | | 22 | 2 |
| TSG Hoffenheim II | 2016–17 | Regionalliga Südwest | 30 | 1 | — | | — | | 30 | 1 |
| TSG Hoffenheim II | 2017–18 | Regionalliga Südwest | 4 | 0 | — | | — | | 4 | 0 |
| TSG Hoffenheim II | 2018–19 | Regionalliga Südwest | 4 | 2 | — | | — | | 4 | 2 |
| TSG Hoffenheim II | Total | | 38 | 3 | — | | — | | 38 | 3 |
| TSG Hoffenheim | 2017–18 | Bundesliga | 9 | 0 | 0 | 0 | 4 (Note: Appearances in UEFA Europa League) | 0 | 13 | 0 |
| TSG Hoffenheim | 2018–19 | Bundesliga | 17 | 0 | 1 | 0 | 2 (Note: Appearances in UEFA Champions League) | 0 | 20 | 0 |
| TSG Hoffenheim | 2019–20 | Bundesliga | 28 | 0 | 2 | 0 | — | | 30 | 0 |
| TSG Hoffenheim | 2020–21 | Bundesliga | 26 | 0 | 1 | 0 | 3 | 0 | 30 | 0 |
| TSG Hoffenheim | 2021–22 | Bundesliga | 28 | 2 | 3 | 0 | — | | 31 | 2 |
| TSG Hoffenheim | 2022–23 | Bundesliga | 1 | 0 | 1 | 0 | — | | 2 | 0 |
| TSG Hoffenheim | Total | | 109 | 2 | 8 | 0 | 9 | 0 | 126 | 2 |
| Bologna (loan) | 2022–23 | Serie A | 30 | 6 | 1 | 0 | — | | 31 | 6 |
| Bologna | 2023–24 | Serie A | 31 | 1 | 3 | 0 | — | | 34 | 1 |
| Bologna | 2024–25 | Serie A | 14 | 0 | 0 | 0 | 6 | 0 | 20 | 0 |
| Bologna | Bologna total | | 75 | 7 | 4 | 0 | 6 | 0 | 85 | 7 |
| Atalanta (loan) | 2024–25 | Serie A | 5 | 0 | 1 | 0 | 2 | 0 | 8 | 0 |
| Como (loan) | 2025–26 | Serie A | 14 | 1 | 1 | 0 | — | | 15 | 1 |
| Como | 2025–26 | Serie A | 0 | 0 | 0 | 0 | — | | 0 | 0 |
| Mainz 05 (loan) | 2025–26 | Bundesliga | 16 | 0 | 0 | 0 | 3 (Note: Appearances in UEFA Conference League) | 1 | 19 | 1 |
| Mainz 05 | 2026–27 | Bundesliga | 7 | 0 | 1 | 0 | — | | 8 | 0 |
| Career total | | | 314 | 15 | 15 | 0 | 20 | 1 | 349 | 16 |

=== International ===
As of match played 17 November 2026

Appearances and goals by national team and year
| National team | Year | Apps | Goals |
|---|---|---|---|
| Austria | 2019 | 5 | 1 |
| Austria | 2020 | 4 | 0 |
| Austria | 2021 | 6 | 0 |
| Austria | 2022 | 5 | 0 |
| Austria | 2023 | 8 | 0 |
| Austria | 2024 | 14 | 1 |
| Austria | 2025 | 7 | 2 |
| Austria | 2026 | 12 | 1 |
| Total | | 61 | 5 |

As of match played 27 March 2026

Scores and results list Austria's goal tally first, score column indicates score after each Posch goal.

List of international goals scored by Stefan Posch
| No. | Date | Venue | Opponent | Score | Result | Competition |
|---|---|---|---|---|---|---|
| 1. | 13 October 2019 | Stožice Stadium, Ljubljana, Slovenia | Slovenia | 1–0 | 1–0 | UEFA Euro 2020 qualification |
| 2. | 13 October 2024 | Raiffeisen Arena, Linz, Austria | Norway | 4–1 | 5–1 | 2024–25 UEFA Nations League B |
| 3. | 9 October 2025 | Ernst-Happel-Stadion, Vienna, Austria | San Marino | 4–0 | 10–0 | 2026 FIFA World Cup qualification |
| 4. | 9 October 2025 | Ernst-Happel-Stadion, Vienna, Austria | San Marino | 5–0 | 10–0 | 2026 FIFA World Cup qualification |
| 5. | 27 March 2026 | Ernst-Happel-Stadion, Vienna, Austria | Ghana | 3–0 | 5–1 | Friendly |
