= Kacper Potulski =

Polish footballer (born 2007)

Personal information
- Date of birth: 19 October 2007 (age 19)
- Place of birth: Gdańsk, Poland
- Height: 1.95 m (6 ft 5 in)
- Position: Centre-back

Team information
- Current team: Mainz 05
- Number: 48

Youth career
- –2021: Lechia Gdańsk
- 2021–2023: Legia Warsaw
- 2023–2025: Mainz 05

Senior career*
Years	Team	Apps	(Gls)
2025	Mainz 05 II	10	(0)
2025–	Mainz 05	24	(1)

International career^{‡}
2021–2022	Poland U15	6	(1)
2022–2023	Poland U16	9	(1)
2023–2024	Poland U17	18	(1)
2024–2025	Poland U19	11	(0)
2025–	Poland U21	2	(0)
2026–	Poland	5	(1)
- * Club domestic league appearances and goals as of 13:39, 10 November 2026 (UTC) ‡ National team caps and goals as of 23:23, 17 November 2026 (UTC)

Kacper Potulski (born 19 October 2007) is a Polish professional footballer who plays as a centre-back for Bundesliga club Mainz 05 and the Poland national team.

== Club career ==
As a youth player, Potulski joined the academy of Lechia Gdańsk. In 2021, he moved to the youth academy of Polish side Legia Warsaw.

Ahead of the 2023–24 season, Potulski joined the youth setup of German Bundesliga side Mainz 05 at the age of fifteen. He was promoted to the club's senior team in 2025, where he played in the UEFA Conference League.

== International career ==
Potulski is a Poland youth international. During May 2024, he played for the Poland under-17 team at the 2024 UEFA European Under-17 Championship.

In May 2026, he was called up to the Poland national team for the friendlies against Ukraine and Nigeria. He made his debut as a second-half substitute in a 2–0 loss to Ukraine on 31 May. Three days later, Potulski scored his first international goal in the 45th minute of a 2–2 draw against Nigeria. At the age of 18 years and 227 days, he became the fourth youngest goalscorer for Poland.

== Career statistics ==
=== Club ===
As of match played 7 November 2026

Appearances and goals by club, season and competition
Club	Season	League			DFB-Pokal		Europe		Total	
Club	Season	Division	Apps	Goals	Apps	Goals	Apps	Goals	Apps	Goals
Mainz 05 II	2024–25	Regionalliga Südwest	4	0	—		—		4	0
Mainz 05 II	2025–26	Regionalliga Südwest	6	0	—		—		6	0
Mainz 05 II	Total		10	0	—		—		10	0
Mainz 05	2025–26	Bundesliga	15	1	0	0	8 (Note: Appearances in UEFA Conference League)	0	23	1
Mainz 05	2026–27	Bundesliga	9	0	2	0	—		11	0
Mainz 05	Total		24	1	2	0	8	0	34	1
Career total			34	1	2	0	8	0	44	1

=== International ===
As of match played 17 November 2026

Appearances and goals by national team and year
National team	Year	Apps	Goals
Poland	2026	5	1
Total		5	1

Scores and results list Poland's goal tally first, score column indicates score after each Potulski goal.

List of international goals scored by Kacper Potulski
No.	Date	Venue	Opponent	Score	Result	Competition
1	3 June 2026	Stadion Narodowy, Warsaw, Poland	Nigeria	1–1	2–2	Friendly
