= Silvan Widmer =

Swiss footballer (born 1993)

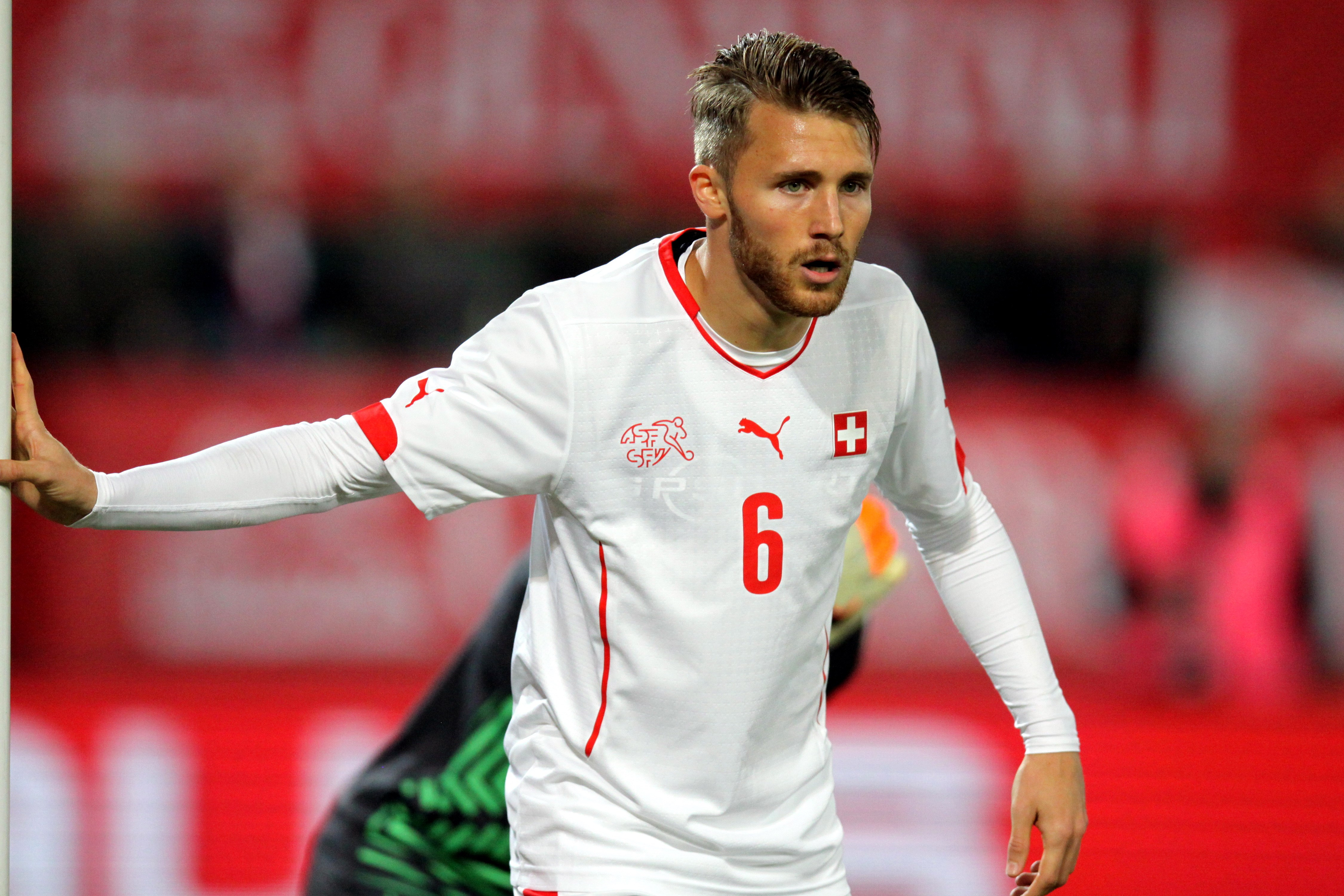
- Widmer playing for Switzerland in 2015

Personal information
- Full name: Silvan Dominic Widmer
- Date of birth: 5 March 1993 (age 33)
- Place of birth: Wettingen, Switzerland
- Height: 1.83 m (6 ft 0 in)
- Position: Right-back

Team information
- Current team: Mainz 05
- Number: 30

Youth career
- 2001–2007: SV Würenlos
- 2007–2008: Baden
- 2008–2010: Aarau

Senior career*
Years	Team	Apps	(Gls)
2010–2011	Aarau II	9	(2)
2011–2013	Aarau	65	(11)
2013–2018	Udinese	131	(5)
2018–2021	Basel	85	(3)
2021–	Mainz 05	137	(9)

International career
2011–2012	Switzerland U19	8	(3)
2012–2014	Switzerland U21	17	(1)
2014–2026	Switzerland	65	(5)
- * Club domestic league appearances and goals as of 22:30, 30 October 2026 (UTC)

Silvan Dominic Widmer (born 5 March 1993) is a Swiss professional footballer who plays as a right-back for and captains Bundesliga club Mainz 05.

== Club career ==
Born in Wettingen, Widmer began his playing career at SV Würenlos and FC Baden before he moved on to FC Aarau where he rose through their youth ranks, soon playing regularly for Aarau's reserve team. He eventually made his league debut on 23 July 2011 against FC Winterthur, starting the match. He scored his first Swiss Challenge League goal in a 2–2 home draw against FC St. Gallen on 21 November.

He signed with Italian side Udinese in the summer of 2012, but remained at Aarau for the remainder of the 2012–13 season.

On 12 July 2018, Widmer signed with fellow Swiss side Basel for a club record €5.5 million. Under trainer Marcel Koller, Basel won the Swiss Cup in the 2018–19 season. In the first round Basel beat FC Montlingen 3–0, in the second round Echallens Région 7–2 and in the round of 16 Winterthur 1–0. In the quarter-finals Sion were defeated 4–2 after extra time and in the semi-finals Zürich were defeated 3–1. All these games were played away from home. The final was held on 19 May 2019 in the Stade de Suisse Wankdorf Bern against Thun. Striker Albian Ajeti scored the first goal and Fabian Frei the second for Basel. Dejan Sorgić then netted a goal for Thun, but the end result was 2–1 for Basel. Widmer played in five cup games and scored one goal, the winning goal in the match against Winterthur.

Widmer moved to German Bundesliga club 1. FSV Mainz 05 in July 2021, having agreed to a three-year contract.

== International career ==
Widmer was a Switzerland youth international having played both at under-19 and under-21 level.

He made his debut for the Swiss senior team as a 59th-minute substitute for Stephan Lichtsteiner in a UEFA Euro 2016 qualifier against San Marino on 12 October 2014.

Widmer scored his first international goal for Switzerland on 6 September 2020, in a 1–1 UEFA Nations League draw against Germany.

He was a member of the Swiss squad for UEFA Euro 2020, where he made his tournament debut as a substitute in the second group match against Italy on 16 June. He went on the start the final group match against Turkey, as well as in the round of 16 against France and the quarter-final against Spain.

Widmer played in seven of Switzerland's eight 2022 FIFA World Cup qualification matches, scoring in the team's 1–1 draw with Italy on 14 November 2021.

At the 2022 FIFA World Cup finals in Qatar, Widmer started all three of Switzerland's Group G matches, but was unavailable for the team's 6–1 loss to Portugal in the round of 16 due to illness.

Widmer started all three of Switzerland's UEFA Euro 2024 Group A matches at right wing-back and was yellow carded in both the 3–1 win against Hungary and the 1–1 draw with Germany. He was suspended for the round of 16 match against Italy, which Switzerland won 2–0 to knock out the defending champions. In the quarter-final against England, he came on as a substitute for Ruben Vargas in the 64th minute and received his third yellow card of the tournament in the 85th minute.

On 20 May 2026, Widmer was selected in the 26-man squad for the 2026 FIFA World Cup.

On 31 August 2026, Widmer announced his retirement from international football, citing a desire to focus on his career with Mainz.

== Career statistics ==
=== Club ===
As of match played 30 October 2026

Appearances and goals by club, season and competition
Club	Season	League			National cup (Note: Includes Swiss Cup, Coppa Italia, DFB-Pokal)		Europe		Other		Total	
Club	Season	Division	Apps	Goals	Apps	Goals	Apps	Goals	Apps	Goals	Apps	Goals
Aarau	2011–12	Swiss Challenge League	29	3	2	0	—		—		31	3
Aarau	2012–13	Swiss Challenge League	34	8	3	0	—		—		37	8
Aarau	Total		63	11	5	3	—		—		68	14
Udinese	2013–14	Serie A	16	0	4	0	1	0	—		21	0
Udinese	2014–15	Serie A	36	2	2	0	—		—		38	2
Udinese	2015–16	Serie A	27	0	1	0	—		—		28	0
Udinese	2016–17	Serie A	28	0	1	0	—		—		29	0
Udinese	2017–18	Serie A	24	3	2	0	—		—		26	3
Udinese	Total		131	5	10	0	1	0	—		142	5
Basel	2018–19	Swiss Super League	31	1	5	1	5 (Note: Four appearances in UEFA Champions League, one appearance in UEFA Europa League)	0	—		41	2
Basel	2019–20	Swiss Super League	32	2	4	2	14 (Note: Four appearances in UEFA Champions League, ten appearances in UEFA Europa League)	2	—		50	6
Basel	2020–21	Swiss Super League	22	0	1	0	3 (Note: Appearances in UEFA Europa League)	1	—		26	1
Basel	Total		85	3	10	3	22	3	—		117	9
Mainz 05	2021–22	Bundesliga	33	4	3	0	—		—		36	4
Mainz 05	2022–23	Bundesliga	26	2	2	0	—		—		28	2
Mainz 05	2023–24	Bundesliga	20	1	0	0	—		—		20	1
Mainz 05	2024–25	Bundesliga	27	0	1	0	—		—		28	0
Mainz 05	2025–26	Bundesliga	27	2	2	0	11 (Note: Appearances in UEFA Conference League)	1	—		40	3
Mainz 05	2026–27	Bundesliga	4	0	2	0	—		—		6	0
Mainz 05	Total		137	9	10	0	11	1	—		158	10
Career total			416	28	35	3	34	4	0	0	487	35

=== International ===
Appearances and goals by national team and year
National team	Year	Apps	Goals
Switzerland	2014	1	0
Switzerland	2015	4	0
Switzerland	2016	3	0
Switzerland	2017	1	0
Switzerland	2018	0	0
Switzerland	2019	0	0
Switzerland	2020	4	1
Switzerland	2021	14	1
Switzerland	2022	10	0
Switzerland	2023	2	1
Switzerland	2024	10	1
Switzerland	2025	7	1
Switzerland	2026	9	0
Total		65	5

As of match played 5 September 2025. Switzerland score listed first, score column indicates score after each Widmer goal.

List of international goals scored by Silvan Widmer
No.	Date	Venue	Cap	Opponent	Score	Result	Competition
1	6 September 2020	St. Jakob-Park, Basel, Switzerland	10	Germany	1–1	1–1	2020–21 UEFA Nations League A
2	12 November 2021	Stadio Olimpico, Rome, Italy	26	Italy	1–0	1–1	2022 FIFA World Cup qualification
3	28 March 2023	Stade de Genève, Geneva, Switzerland	39	Israel	3–0	3–0	UEFA Euro 2024 qualifying
4	8 June 2024	Kybunpark, St. Gallen, Switzerland	43	Austria	1–1	1–1	Friendly
5	5 September 2025	St. Jakob-Park, Basel, Switzerland	51	Kosovo	3–0	4–0	2026 FIFA World Cup qualification

== Honours ==
FC Aarau

- Swiss Challenge League: 2011–12

FC Basel

- Swiss Cup: 2018–19

Individual

- Swiss Super League Team of the Year: 2019–20, 2020–21
