= 2025 UEFA European Under-21 Championship final =

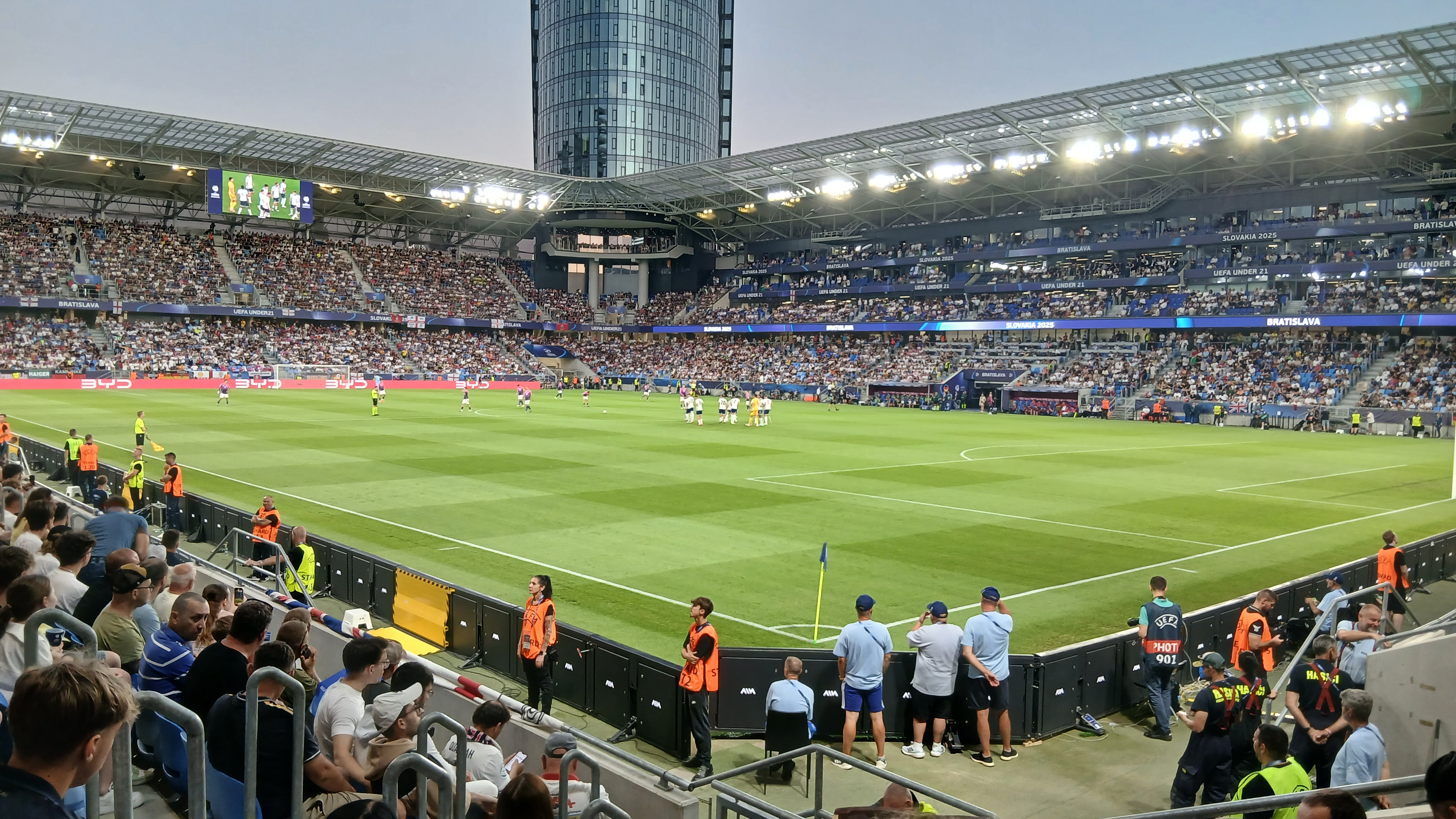
- Shortly before kick-off, at Tehelné pole in Bratislava.
- Event: 2025 UEFA European Under-21 Championship
England	Germany
(England)	(Germany)
3	2
- After extra time
- Date: 28 June 2025
- Venue: Tehelné pole, Bratislava
- Man of the Match: James McAtee (England)
- Referee: Sander van der Eijk (Netherlands)
- Attendance: 19,153
- Weather: Clear; 26 °C (79 °F); 51% humidity

The 2025 UEFA European Under-21 Championship final was a football match that took place on 28 June 2025 at Tehelné pole in Bratislava, Slovakia, to determine the winners of the 2025 UEFA European Under-21 Championship. The match was contested by defending champions England and Germany.

England won the match 3–2 after extra time for their second consecutive UEFA European Under-21 Championship and their fourth title overall. Harvey Elliott and Omari Hutchinson both scored to put England in control of the final, before Nelson Weiper and Paul Nebel each scored respectively to bring Germany back into the game. Nebel's shot in the fourth minute of injury time at the end of the second half hit the crossbar. Substitute Jonathan Rowe scored the winner in extra time with a header to seal the victory in Bratislava. With the game in injury time after extra time, Germany had a final chance as Merlin Röhl's shot from 16 metres (17 yd) hit the crossbar, with the game finishing moments later.

England captain James McAtee was named man of the match in the aftermath, with the game having been attended by England head coach Thomas Tuchel.

The match was broadcast live in the United Kingdom by Channel 4, with the coverage being watched by 3.7 million viewers, making it that day's most watched programming in the country.

== Route to the final ==
=== England ===
England's route to the final
	Opponent	Result
1	Czech Republic	3–1
2	Slovenia	0–0
3	Germany	1–2
QF	Spain	3–1
SF	Netherlands	2–1

England qualified for the tournament by finishing first in their qualification group, ahead of Ukraine and Serbia. In the finals, they were drawn in Group B along with Germany, Slovenia and the Czech Republic. Their opening match was against the Czech Republic at DAC Aréna in Dunajská Streda on 12 June. England won the game 3–1 with Harvey Elliott scoring the side's first goal of the tournament. Jonathan Rowe scored England's second goal from a Tino Livramento cross, before Daniel Fila scored a header for the Czech Republic three minutes later, after a cross from Václav Sejk. England's Charlie Cresswell completed the scoring with a 76th-minute header from a corner taken by Alex Scott. England's second match was against Slovenia on 15 June at Štadión pod Zoborom in Nitra, and finished as a scoreless draw. England's third and final group game was against Germany at Štadión pod Zoborom, with the team needing a point to guarantee progress. After Slovenia lost to the Czech Republic in the other match taking place simultaneously, England advanced to the knockout stages regardless of their game's result. Ansgar Knauff and Nelson Weiper scored to give Germany a 2–0 half time lead. In the second half, Alex Scott scored for England to make the score 2–1, which was the final result.

England's quarter-final was against Spain at Anton Malatinský Stadium in Trnava on 21 June. Goals from James McAtee and Elliott helped England to a 2–0 lead before Spain scored a penalty through Javi Guerra. England were later awarded a penalty of their own, with Elliot Anderson converting to make the final score 3–1. The team advanced to a semi-final match against the Netherlands at Tehelné pole in Bratislava on 25 June. Two goals from Elliott, in between a long-distance goal from Dutch substitute Noah Ohio resulted in a 2–1 win for the English.

=== Germany ===
Germany's route to the final
	Opponent	Result
1	Slovenia	3–0
2	Czech Republic	4–2
3	England	2–1
QF	Italy	3–2 (a.e.t.)
SF	France	3–0

Germany reached the tournament courtesy of winning their qualification group in front of Poland, securing their progression with one match to play. Drawn in the same group as England in Group B, their opening match saw the Germans play Slovenia at Štadión pod Zoborom in Nitra on 12 June. The match ended in a comfortable 3–0 win with Nick Woltemade scoring a hat trick with goals coming in the 19th, 42nd and 82nd minutes. Their second game was against the Czech Republic in Dunajská Streda. Held at the DAC Aréna, the match ended as a high-scoring 4–2 victory for Germany. Germany took the lead through Nicolo Tresoldi before goals from Paul Nebel, Nick Woltemade and Eric Martel gave the Germans a 4–0 lead. The Czechs scored two goals towards the end of the match but Germany prevailed and became the first team from Group B to secure their progression to the knockout stage. Their final group game was back in Nitra against England, where Ansgar Knauff and Nelson Weiper gave their team a 2–0 lead before an Alex Scott consolation goal for England completed the scoring as Germany won 2–1. Germany was the only team to have won all their group games.

In the quarter-finals, Germany met Group A runners-up, Italy, in Dunajská Streda. The game was a tightly fought match, with the Italians taking the lead in the 58th minute due to Luca Koleosho. But the Germans gained the lead after Nelson Weiper and Nick Woltemade scored in the 68th and 87th minutes respectively to lead 2–1. However, with very little time remaining, the Italians salvaged their tournament with a 95th minute goal by Giuseppe Ambrosino to tie the score at 2–2. In extra time, it was Germany who scored the decisive and solitary goal through substitute Merlin Röhl, advancing to the semi-finals with a 3–2 victory. The semi-finals beckoned and it was France who stood between Germany and the final in Bratislava. Having to travel to the east of Slovakia for the first time, with the match taking place at the Košice Football Arena in Košice, two early goals by Nelson Weiper and Nick Woltemade in the 8th and 14th minutes respectively gave Germany an advantage that they never threw away. A late third by Brajan Gruda in second-half injury time cemented their spot in the final on 28 June against England.

== Match details ==
28 June 2025
21:00

England	3–2 (a.e.t.)	Germany
Elliott 5'; Hutchinson 24'; Rowe 92'	Report	Weiper 45+1'; Nebel 61'

Tehelné pole, Bratislava
Attendance: 19,153
Referee: Sander van der Eijk (Netherlands)

England	Germany

GK	1	James Beadle	(yellow card) 115'
RB	16	Jack Hinshelwood
CB	4	Jarell Quansah
CB	5	Charlie Cresswell
LB	2	Tino Livramento
CM	8	Elliot Anderson		(substituted off) 98'
CM	10	James McAtee (c)		(substituted off) 91'
CM	20	Alex Scott	(yellow card) 43'	(substituted off) 44'
RF	18	Jay Stansfield		(substituted off) 62'
CF	11	Omari Hutchinson		(substituted off) 98'
LF	19	Harvey Elliott		(substituted off) 91'
Substitutions:
MF	23	Tyler Morton		(substituted on) 44'
DF	12	Brooke Norton-Cuffy		(substituted on) 62'
FW	9	Jonathan Rowe		(substituted on) 91'
FW	21	Ethan Nwaneri		(substituted on) 91'
DF	15	CJ Egan-Riley		(substituted on) 98'
FW	17	Samuel Iling-Junior	(yellow card) 113'	(substituted on) 98'
Manager:
Lee Carsley

GK	1	Noah Atubolu
RB	2	Nnamdi Collins
CB	4	Bright Arrey-Mbi
CB	14	Tim Oermann		(substituted off) 106'
LB	3	Nathaniel Brown		(substituted off) 86'
CM	20	Paul Nebel
CM	6	Eric Martel (c)	(yellow card) 37'	(substituted off) 98'
CM	18	Rocco Reitz
RF	19	Nelson Weiper		(substituted off) 80'
CF	10	Nick Woltemade
LF	17	Brajan Gruda		(substituted off) 73'
Substitutions:
MF	7	Ansgar Knauff		(substituted on) 73'
MF	8	Merlin Röhl		(substituted on) 80'
DF	13	Lukas Ullrich		(substituted on) 86'
FW	9	Nicolò Tresoldi		(substituted on) 98'
MF	22	Paul Wanner		(substituted on) 106'
Manager:
Antonio Di Salvo

Man of the Match:
James McAtee (England)

Assistant referees:
Rens Bluemink (Netherlands)
Stefan De Groot (Netherlands)
Fourth official:
Simone Sozza (Italy)
Video assistant referee:
Clay Ruperti (Netherlands)
Assistant video assistant referee:
Cesar Soto Grado (Spain)

Match rules

- 90 minutes.
- 30 minutes of extra time if necessary.
- Penalty shoot-out if scores still level.
- Maximum of twelve named substitutes.
- Maximum of five substitutions, with a sixth allowed in extra time. (Note: Each team was given only three opportunities to make substitutions, with a fourth opportunity in extra time, excluding substitutions made at half-time, before the start of extra time and at half-time in extra time.)
