= Lee Jae-sung =

South Korean footballer (born 1992)

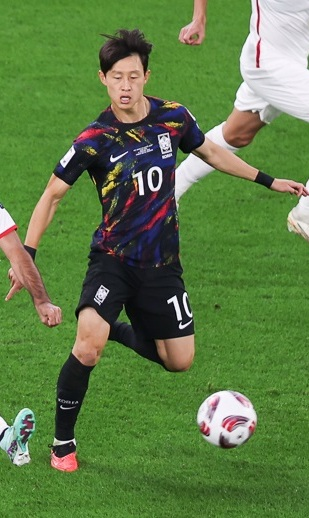
- Lee playing for South Korea at the 2023 AFC Asian Cup

Personal information
- Full name: Lee Jae-sung
- Date of birth: 10 August 1992 (age 34)
- Place of birth: Ulsan, South Korea
- Height: 1.80 m (5 ft 11 in)
- Positions: Attacking midfielder; winger

Team information
- Current team: Mainz 05
- Number: 7

Youth career
- 2005–2007: Hakseong Middle School
- 2008–2010: Hakseong High School

College career
Years	Team	Apps	(Gls)
2011–2013	Korea University		

Senior career*
Years	Team	Apps	(Gls)
2014–2018	Jeonbuk Hyundai Motors	137	(26)
2018–2021	Holstein Kiel	93	(19)
2021–	Mainz 05	159	(29)

International career^{‡}
2012–2014	South Korea U23	14	(1)
2015–	South Korea	112	(16)
Medal record
Men's football
Representing South Korea
Asian Games
Gold medal – first place	2014 Incheon
EAFF Championship
Winner	2015 China
Winner	2017 Japan
- * Club domestic league appearances and goals as of 8 November 2026 (UTC) ‡ National team caps and goals as of 17 November 2026 (UTC)

- Lee Jae-sung
- Hangul: 이재성
- Hanja: 李在城
- RR: I Jaeseong
- MR: I Chaesŏng
- IPA: [i.d͡ʑɛ.sʌŋ]

Lee Jae-sung (Korean: 이재성; born 10 August 1992) is a South Korean professional footballer who plays as an attacking midfielder or winger for Bundesliga club Mainz 05 and the South Korea national team.

== Club career ==
=== Jeonbuk Hyundai Motors ===
Lee joined Jeonbuk Hyundai Motors in 2014 and made his debut in the 2014 AFC Champions League match against Yokohama F. Marinos on 26 February. Choi Kang-hee, the manager of Jeonbuk at the time, praised his ability which kept balance about attack and defense of team, and actively used him, the newcomer.

In 2016, he spent his best season by providing 17 assists during a year and winning the 2016 AFC Champions League.

In the 2017 K League 1, he won the Most Valuable Player award after having eight goals and ten assists during 28 appearances.

=== Holstein Kiel ===
In July 2018, Lee joined 2. Bundesliga club Holstein Kiel on a three-year deal until 30 June 2021. The transfer fee paid to Jeonbuk was reported as €1.5 million. He played his first game against Hamburger SV on 4 August, and was named the player of the matchday by leaving a deep impression on kicker with two assists.

After the end of the 2019–20 season, his goal against Karlsruher SC was selected as Kiel's Goal of the Season.

On 13 January 2021, he played full time and scored the fourth penalty in a 2020–21 DFB-Pokal match, where Kiel won 6–5 on penalties after drawing 2–2 against Bayern Munich. Afterwards, Kiel reached the semi-finals of DFB-Pokal for the first time in history, but they were eliminated by Borussia Dortmund.

Kiel also finished third in the 2020–21 2. Bundesliga, qualifying for the promotion play-off. In the two-legged play-off, Lee scored a goal and provided an assist, contributing to all two of Kiel's goals, but they lost 5–2 on aggregate to Köln.

=== Mainz 05 ===
In July 2021, Lee joined Bundesliga club Mainz 05 on a three-year deal until 30 June 2024.

Lee was named the player of the 22nd matchday by kicker after dominating Borussia Mönchengladbach including a goal and an assist on 24 February 2023. In that month, he was nominated for the Bundesliga Player of the Month by leading Mainz to three Bundesliga victories as well as having three goals and two assists, but lost to Julian Brandt. He was also nominated for the Bundesliga Team of the Season because of his steady performance during the 2022–23 season, but failed to be selected.

Lee seemed lethargic while Mainz earned only one win in the first half of the 2023–24 season, but he played a key role in saving his team from relegation during the second half of the season.

Lee scored two goals in a 2–1 win over Bayern Munich on 14 December 2024, leading Bayern to their first defeat in the 2024–25 Bundesliga. During the 2024–25 season, he had seven goals and six assists (ten assists according to the standard of kicker) in 33 league appearances, helping Mainz qualify for the 2025–26 UEFA Conference League.

After coming on as a 60th minute substitute in a league phase match of the 2025–26 Conference League on 6 November 2025, Lee had one assist and the winning goal, converting Fiorentina's 1–0 lead into Mainz's 2–1 win. The goal was his first goal at UEFA competitions excluding qualifiers.

== International career ==
In the 2017 EAFF Championship, Lee led South Korea's title, and was named the Most Valuable Player and the Best Duel Player.

Lee was named in South Korea's squad for the 2018 FIFA World Cup, and played all three games in the group stage. He also participated in the 2022 FIFA World Cup, helping South Korea advance to the knockout stage.

On 10 October 2025, he made his 100th international appearance in a friendly match against Brazil.

He received a call-up by Hong Myung-bo to join the 2026 FIFA World Cup squad for South Korea.

== Style of play ==
Lee possesses the ball for a short time, and shows great influence when moving without the ball. He prefers passing in a fast tempo to carrying, and has a high work rate to preoccupy suitable spots. He has good movement and he is skilled in interceptions when defending.

== Career statistics ==
=== Club ===
As of match played 8 November 2026

Appearances and goals by club, season and competition
Club	Season	League			National cup (Note: Includes Korean FA Cup, DFB-Pokal)		Continental		Other		Total	
Club	Season	Division	Apps	Goals	Apps	Goals	Apps	Goals	Apps	Goals	Apps	Goals
Jeonbuk Hyundai Motors	2014	K League 1	26	4	3	0	7 (Note: Appearances in AFC Champions League)	1	—		36	5
Jeonbuk Hyundai Motors	2015	K League 1	34	7	1	0	9	2	—		44	9
Jeonbuk Hyundai Motors	2016	K League 1	32	3	1	0	13	1	2 (Note: Appearances in FIFA Club World Cup)	0	48	4
Jeonbuk Hyundai Motors	2017	K League 1	28	8	0	0	—		—		28	8
Jeonbuk Hyundai Motors	2018	K League 1	17	4	0	0	8	1	—		25	5
Jeonbuk Hyundai Motors	Total		137	26	5	0	37	5	2	0	181	31
Holstein Kiel	2018–19	2. Bundesliga	29	5	2	0	—		—		31	5
Holstein Kiel	2019–20	2. Bundesliga	31	9	2	1	—		—		33	10
Holstein Kiel	2020–21	2. Bundesliga	33	5	5	2	—		2 (Note: Appearances in Bundesliga promotion play-offs)	1	40	8
Holstein Kiel	Total		93	19	9	3	—		2	1	104	23
Mainz 05	2021–22	Bundesliga	27	4	3	0	—		—		30	4
Mainz 05	2022–23	Bundesliga	34	7	2	0	—		—		36	7
Mainz 05	2023–24	Bundesliga	29	6	2	0	—		—		31	6
Mainz 05	2024–25	Bundesliga	33	7	1	0	—		—		34	7
Mainz 05	2025–26	Bundesliga	28	4	2	0	9 (Note: Appearance in UEFA Conference League)	2	—		39	6
Mainz 05	2026–27	Bundesliga	8	1	2	0	—		—		10	1
Mainz 05	Total		159	29	12	0	9	2	—		180	31
Career total			389	74	26	3	46	7	4	1	465	85

=== International ===
As of match played 17 November 2026

Appearances and goals by national team and year
National team	Year	Apps	Goals
South Korea	2015	13	4
South Korea	2016	6	0
South Korea	2017	8	1
South Korea	2018	14	2
South Korea	2019	8	1
South Korea	2020	2	0
South Korea	2021	8	1
South Korea	2022	8	0
South Korea	2023	10	0
South Korea	2024	17	4
South Korea	2025	8	2
South Korea	2026	10	1
Total		112	16

Scores and results list South Korea's goal tally first, score column indicates score after each Lee goal.

List of international goals scored by Lee Jae-sung
No.	Date	Venue	Opponent	Score	Result	Competition
1	31 March 2015	Seoul World Cup Stadium, Seoul, South Korea	New Zealand	1–0	1–0	Friendly
2	16 June 2015	Rajamangala Stadium, Bangkok, Thailand	Myanmar	1–0	2–0	2018 FIFA World Cup qualification
3	3 September 2015	Hwaseong Stadium, Hwaseong, South Korea	Laos	8–0	8–0	2018 FIFA World Cup qualification
4	12 November 2015	Suwon World Cup Stadium, Suwon, South Korea	Myanmar	1–0	4–0	2018 FIFA World Cup qualification
5	9 December 2017	Ajinomoto Stadium, Tokyo, Japan	China	2–1	2–2	2017 EAFF Championship
6	1 June 2018	Jeonju World Cup Stadium, Jeonju, South Korea	Bosnia and Herzegovina	1–1	1–3	Friendly
7	7 September 2018	Goyang Stadium, Goyang, South Korea	Costa Rica	1–0	2–0	Friendly
8	26 March 2019	Seoul World Cup Stadium, Seoul, South Korea	Colombia	2–1	2–1	Friendly
9	16 November 2021	Thani bin Jassim Stadium, Al Rayyan, Qatar	Iraq	1–0	3–0	2022 FIFA World Cup qualification
10	6 January 2024	New York University Stadium, Abu Dhabi, United Arab Emirates	Iraq	1–0	1–0	Friendly
11	26 March 2024	Rajamangala Stadium, Bangkok, Thailand	Thailand	1–0	3–0	2026 FIFA World Cup qualification
12	10 October 2024	Amman International Stadium, Amman, Jordan	Jordan	1–0	2–0	2026 FIFA World Cup qualification
13	15 October 2024	Yongin Mireu Stadium, Yongin, South Korea	Iraq	3–1	3–2	2026 FIFA World Cup qualification
14	25 March 2025	Suwon World Cup Stadium, Suwon, South Korea	Jordan	1–0	1–1	2026 FIFA World Cup qualification
15	10 June 2025	Seoul World Cup Stadium, Seoul, South Korea	Kuwait	4–0	4–0	2026 FIFA World Cup qualification
16	13 November 2026	Jassim bin Hamad Stadium, Al Rayyan, Qatar	Saudi Arabia	2–3	2–3	Friendly

== Honours ==
Jeonbuk Hyundai Motors

- K League 1: 2014, 2015, 2017, 2018
- AFC Champions League: 2016

South Korea U23

- Asian Games: 2014

South Korea

- EAFF Championship: 2015, 2017

Individual

- K League 1 Best XI: 2015, 2016, 2017
- K League 1 Young Player of the Year: 2015
- AFC Champions League All-Star Squad: 2016
- AFC Champions League Opta Best XI: 2016
- K League 1 Most Valuable Player: 2017
- EAFF Championship Most Valuable Player: 2017
- Holstein Kiel Goal of the Season: 2019–20

== See also ==
- List of men's footballers with 100 or more international caps
