= Nelson Weiper =

German footballer

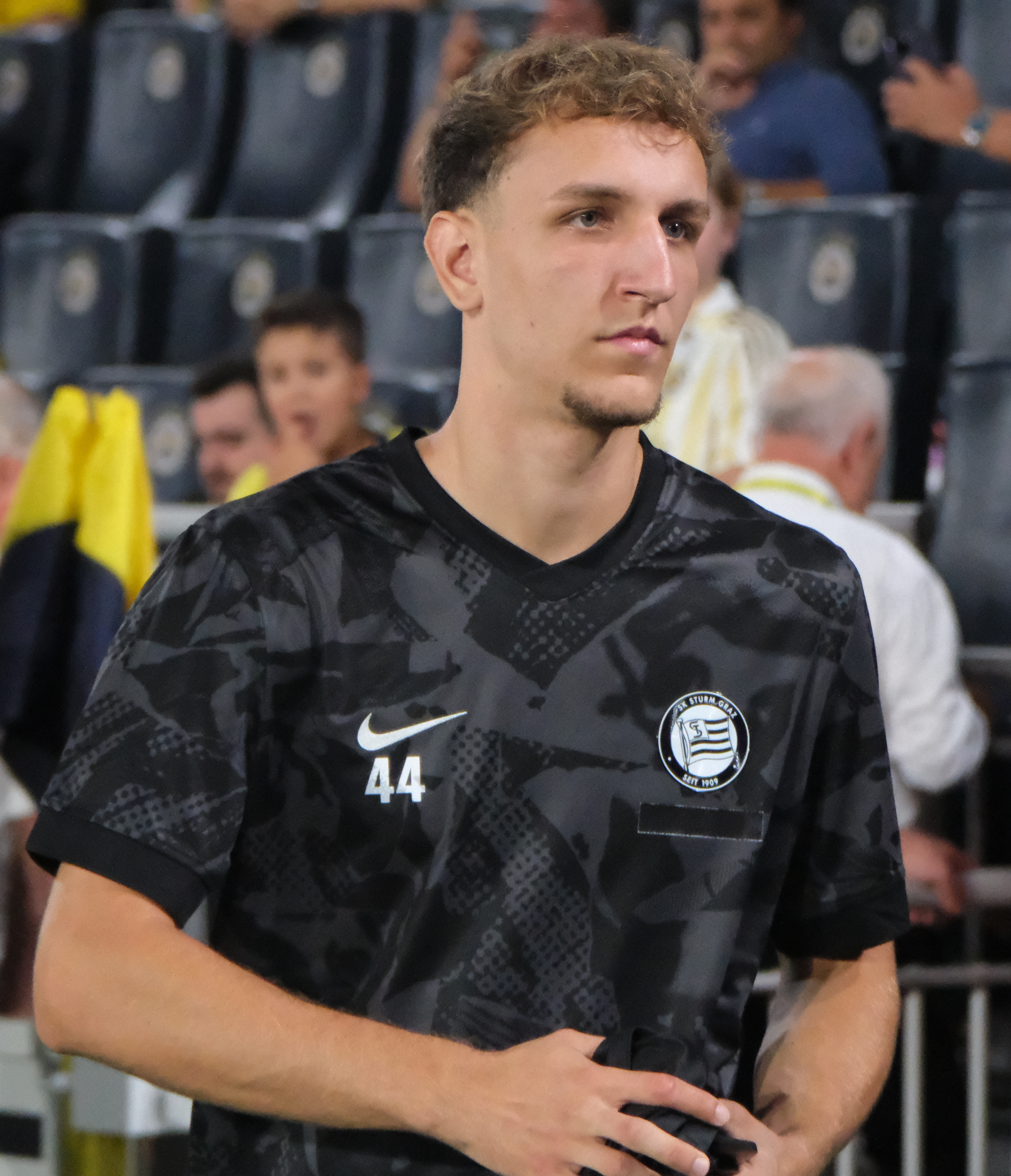
- Nelson Weiper with Sturm Graz

Personal information
- Full name: Nelson Felix Patrick Weiper
- Date of birth: 17 March 2005 (age 21)
- Place of birth: Mainz, Germany
- Height: 1.91 m (6 ft 3 in)
- Position: Striker

Team information
- Current team: Sturm Graz (on loan from Mainz 05)
- Number: 44

Youth career
- 2013–2022: Mainz 05

Senior career*
Years	Team	Apps	(Gls)
2022–2025	Mainz 05 II	6	(1)
2022–	Mainz 05	61	(5)
2026–	→ Sturm Graz (loan)	4	(2)

International career^{‡}
2021–2022	Germany U17	15	(13)
2022–2023	Germany U18	5	(1)
2023–	Germany U21	19	(5)
Medal record
Men's football
Representing Germany
UEFA European Under-21 Championship
Runner-up	2025 Slovakia
- * Club domestic league appearances and goals as of 30 August 2026 ‡ National team caps and goals as of 00:10, 1 April 2026 (UTC)

Nelson Felix Patrick Weiper (German pronunciation: [ˈnɛlsn̩ ˈvaɪ̯pɐ]; born 17 March 2005) is a German professional footballer who plays as a striker for Austrian Bundesliga club Sturm Graz, on loan from Bundesliga club Mainz 05, and the Germany national under-21 team.

== Club career ==
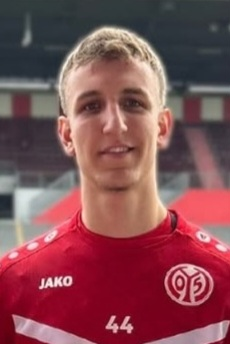
Nelson Weiper with Mainz 05

Weiper is a product of the youth academy of Mainz 05, having joined as an U8. Working his way up all their youth categories, he signed a professional contract with the club on 18 March 2022. He made his senior debut in the Bundesliga as a late substitute for Mainz in a 2–1 loss to Freiburg on 1 October 2022. He won the 2022 U17 Fritz Walter Medal, an award for the most outstanding German youth prospect in their age group. He played a huge part in helping the Mainz 05 U19 side win the U19 Bundesliga in the 2022–23 season.

On 24 February 2023, Weiper netted his first senior Bundesliga goal in a 4–0 win over Borussia Mönchengladbach. After registering three goals and two assists in the 2024–25 Bundesliga season, as well as four goals in the Under-21 Euros for Germany, Mainz coach Bo Henriksen predicted that Weiper would score 15 goals in the 2025–26 season, after having predicted 20 goals for teammate Jonathan Burkardt the previous season, who eventually scored 18.

On 28 August 2025, Weiper would score his first European and season goal in a 4–1 win over Norwegian side Rosenborg, in the UEFA Conference League playoffs, helping his team qualify for the final tournament. On 23 October, he'd score the winning goal in a 1–0 victory over Croatian side Zrinjski, in the Conference League league phase. He would reach the quarter-final with Mainz, eventually getting knocked out by RC Straßburg 4–2 on aggregate. He'd finish his season with only two European and no domestic goals scored across 34 matches.

On 17 July 2026, Weiper moved on loan to Sturm Graz in Austria for the 2026–27 season.

== International career ==
Weiper is a youth international for Germany, having played for the Germany U17s and U18s. He was prolific with the U17s, scoring 13 goals in 15 games. He took part at the UEFA Under-21 Championship in 2025, scoring 4 goals against England, Italy and France, including a goal in the final, which Germany lost 2–3. He finished third-highest topscorer of the tournament, behind Harvey Elliott (5 goals) and teammate Nick Woltemade (6 goals).

== Personal life ==
Weiper was born in Germany to a German father and an Albanian mother from the city of Kuçovë. His brother, Henrik, is also a footballer and youth international for Albania and Kosovo.

== Career statistics ==
As of match played 5 September 2026

Appearances and goals by club, season and competition
Club	Season	League			Cup		Europe		Other		Total	
Club	Season	Division	Apps	Goals	Apps	Goals	Apps	Goals	Apps	Goals	Apps	Goals
Mainz 05 II	2022–23	Regionalliga Südwest	1	0	—		—		—		1	0
Mainz 05 II	2023–24	Regionalliga Südwest	2	0	—		—		—		2	0
Mainz 05 II	2024–25	Regionalliga Südwest	3	1	—		—		—		3	1
Mainz 05 II	Total		6	1	—		—		—		6	1
Mainz 05	2022–23	Bundesliga	9	2	0	0	—		—		9	2
Mainz 05	2023–24	Bundesliga	5	0	1	0	—		—		6	0
Mainz 05	2024–25	Bundesliga	23	3	2	0	—		—		25	3
Mainz 05	2025–26	Bundesliga	24	0	1	0	8 (Note: Appearances in UEFA Conference League)	2	—		33	2
Mainz 05	Total		61	5	4	0	8	2	—		73	7
Sturm Graz	2026–27	Austrian Bundesliga	4	2	2	1	3 (Note: Three appearances in UEFA Champions League)	0	—		9	3
Career total			71	8	6	1	11	2	0	0	88	11

== Honours ==
Germany U21

- UEFA European Under-21 Championship runner-up: 2025

Individual

- Fritz Walter Medal U17 Gold: 2022
