= 2025–26 1. FSV Mainz 05 season =

Mainz 05
2025–26 season
- President: Stefan Hofmann
- Head coach: Bo Henriksen (until 3 December); Benjamin Hoffmann (interim, from 3 to 7 December); Urs Fischer (from 7 December)
- Stadium: Mewa Arena
- Bundesliga: 10th
- DFB-Pokal: Second round
- UEFA Conference League: Quarter-finals
- Top goalscorer: League: Nadiem Amiri (12); All: Nadiem Amiri (17)
- Average home league attendance: 31,679
Home colours	Away colours	Third colours

The 2025–26 season was the 121st season in the history of 1. FSV Mainz 05, and the club's 17th consecutive season in the Bundesliga. In addition to the domestic league, the club participated in the DFB-Pokal and the UEFA Conference League.

== Background and pre-season ==
Bo Henriksen was appointed as manager of Mainz 05 in February 2024, and helped the club to avoid relegation from the Bundesliga, which they achieved on the final day of the 2023–24 Bundesliga. The club won just twice in their opening nine matches of the 2024–25 season, though their results improved as the season progressed and they were in the Champions League qualification places of the Bundesliga table by March 2025. However, Mainz won only once in their final 9 Bundesliga matches and eventually finished 6th, qualifying them for the 2025–26 UEFA Conference League.

== Review ==
Manager Bo Henriksen was sacked on 3 December 2025, with the club bottom of the Bundesliga table on 6 points. Under-23 manager Benjamin Hoffmann took over as manager on an interim basis. On 7 December 2025, former Union Berlin manager Urs Fischer was appointed as the club's new manager.

== Competitions ==
=== Bundesliga ===
==== League table ====
Pos	Team	Pld	W	D	L	GF	GA	GD	Pts
8	Eintracht Frankfurt	34	11	11	12	61	65	−4	44
9	FC Augsburg	34	12	7	15	45	61	−16	43
10	Mainz 05	34	10	10	14	44	53	−9	40
11	Union Berlin	34	10	9	15	44	58	−14	39
12	Borussia Mönchengladbach	34	9	11	14	42	53	−11	38

Source: Bundesliga
Rules for classification: 1) Points; 2) Goal difference; 3) Goals scored; 4) Head-to-head results; 5) Head-to-head away goals scored; 6) Away goals scored; 7) Play-off.
(Rules 4–6 only apply after home and away matches have been played between the tied teams.)

==== Match details ====
Bundesliga match details
Round	Date	Time	Opponent	Venue	Result F–A	Scorers	Attendance	League position	Ref.
1	24 August 2025	15:30	1. FC Köln	Home	0–1		33,305	14th	
2	31 August 2025	15:30	VfL Wolfsburg	Away	1–1	Amiri 89' pen.	21,893	13th	
3	13 September 2025	15:30	RB Leipzig	Home	0–1		32,000	15th	
4	20 September 2025	15:30	FC Augsburg	Away	4–1	Sano 14', Kohr 26', Nebel 60', Sieb 69'	29,162	13th	
5	27 September 2025	15:30	Borussia Dortmund	Home	0–2		33,305	14th	
6	5 October 2025	17:30	Hamburger SV	Away	0–4		57,000	16th	
7	18 October 2025	15:30	Bayer Leverkusen	Home	3–4	Lee 34', Amiri 71' pen., Sieb 90'	33,305	16th	
8	26 October 2025	17:30	VfB Stuttgart	Away	1–2	Amiri 41' pen.	59,000	16th	
9	1 November 2025	15:30	Werder Bremen	Home	1–1	Widmer 36'	33,305	17th	
10	9 November 2025	19:30	Eintracht Frankfurt	Away	0–1		59,000	17th	
11	21 November 2025	20:30	TSG Hoffenheim	Home	1–1	da Costa 76'	28,000	17th	
12	30 November 2025	19:30	SC Freiburg	Away	0–4		33,200	18th	
13	5 December 2025	20:30	Borussia Mönchengladbach	Home	0–1		30,500	18th	
14	14 December 2025	17:30	Bayern Munich	Away	2–2	Potulski 45+2', Lee 67'	75,000	18th	
15	21 December 2025	15:30	FC St. Pauli	Home	0–0		33,000	18th	
16	10 January 2026	15:30	Union Berlin	Away	2–2	Amiri 30', Hollerbach 69'	22,012	18th	
17	13 January 2026	20:30	1. FC Heidenheim	Home	2–1	Widmer 30', Amiri 49'	24,500	16th	
18	17 January 2026	15:30	1. FC Köln	Away	1–2	Bell 29'	50,000	17th	
19	24 January 2026	15:30	VfL Wolfsburg	Home	3–1	Tietz 68', Bell 73', Amiri 84' pen.	30,000	16th	
20	31 January 2026	15:30	RB Leipzig	Away	2–1	Amiri 45+6' pen., Silas 49'	35,487	16th	
21	7 February 2026	15:30	FC Augsburg	Home	2–0	Amiri 8' pen., 80' pen.	31,111	14th	
22	13 February 2026	20:30	Borussia Dortmund	Away	0–4		81,365	14th	
23	20 February 2026	20:40	Hamburger SV	Home	1–1	Amiri 42'	33,305	13th	
24	28 February 2026	15:30	Bayer Leverkusen	Away	1–1	Becker 67'	30,210	14th	
25	7 March 2026	15:30	VfB Stuttgart	Home	2–2	Lee 39', da Costa 90+1'	33,305	15th	
26	15 March 2026	15:30	Werder Bremen	Away	2–0	Nebel 6', Lee 52'	41,800	13th	
27	22 March 2026	15:30	Eintracht Frankfurt	Home	2–1	Nebel 6', 89'	33,305	11th	
28	4 April 2026	15:30	TSG Hoffenheim	Away	2–1	Tietz 13', 79'	30,150	9th	
29	12 April 2026	19:30	SC Freiburg	Home	0–1		30,000	9th	
30	19 April 2026	19:30	Borussia Mönchengladbach	Away	1–1	Amiri 90+8' pen.	50,245	10th	
31	25 April 2026	15:30	Bayern Munich	Home	3–4	Kohr 15', Nebel 29', Becker 45+2'	33,305	10th	
32	3 May 2026	15:30	FC St. Pauli	Away	2–1	Tietz 6', Mwene 40'	29,546	10th	
33	10 May 2026	19:30	Union Berlin	Home	1–3	Becker 48'	32,600	10th	
34	16 May 2026	15:30	1. FC Heidenheim	Away	2–0	Tietz 7', Amiri 43'	15,000	10th	

=== DFB-Pokal ===
DFB-Pokal match details
Round	Date	Time	Opponent	Venue	Result F–A	Scorers	Attendance	Ref.
First round	18 August 2025	18:00	Dynamo Dresden	Away	1–0	Amiri 22'	30,105	
Second round	29 October 2025	18:00	VfB Stuttgart	Away	0–2		29,400	

=== UEFA Conference League ===
==== Qualification ====
Conference League qualifying match details
Round	Date	Time	Opponent	Venue	Result F–A	Scorers	Attendance	Ref.
Play-off round, first leg	21 August 2025	18:00	Rosenborg BK	Away	1–2	Amiri 26'	18,293	
Play-off round, second leg	28 August 2025	21:00	Rosenborg BK	Home	4–1	Bell 28', Lee 43', Weiper 44', Amiri 57'	30,000	

==== League phase ====
Pos	Team	Pld	W	D	L	GF	GA	GD	Pts	Qualification
5	(Royal Spanish Football Federation) Rayo Vallecano	6	4	1	1	13	7	+6	13	Advance to round of 16 (seeded)
6	(Ukrainian Association of Football) Shakhtar Donetsk	6	4	1	1	10	5	+5	13	Advance to round of 16 (seeded)
7	(German Football Association) Mainz 05	6	4	1	1	7	3	+4	13	Advance to round of 16 (seeded)
8	(Cyprus Football Association) AEK Larnaca	6	3	3	0	7	1	+6	12	Advance to round of 16 (seeded)
9	(Swiss Football Association) Lausanne-Sport	6	3	2	1	6	3	+3	11	Advance to knockout phase play-offs (seeded)

Source: UEFA
Rules for classification: League phase tiebreakers

Conference League league phase match details
Round	Date	Time	Opponent	Venue	Result F–A	Scorers	Attendance	Ref.
1	2 October 2025	18:45	AC Omonia	Away	1–0	Amiri 75' pen.	9,500	
2	23 October 2025	21:00	Zrinjski Mostar	Home	1–0	Weiper 24'	30,200	
3	6 November 2025	18:45	AC Fiorentina	Home	2–1	Hollerbach 68', Lee 90+5'	30,300	
4	27 November 2025	18:45	Universitatea Craiova	Away	0–1		24,284	
5	11 December 2025	21:00	Lech Poznan	Away	1–1	Kawasaki 28'	28,139	
6	18 December 2025	21:00	Samsunspor	Home	2–0	Widmer 44', Amiri 48' pen.	33,000	

==== Knockout stage ====
Conference League knockout stage match details
Round	Date	Time	Opponent	Venue	Result F–A	Scorers	Attendance	Ref.
Round of 16 (first leg)	12 March 2026	21:00	Sigma Olomouc	Away	0–0		9,456	
Round of 16 (second leg)	19 March 2026	18:45	Sigma Olomouc	Home	2–0	Posch 46', Sieb 83'	31,000	
Quarter-final (first leg)	9 April 2026	21:00	RC Strasbourg	Home	2–0	Sano 11', Posch 19'	32,000	
Quarter-final (second leg)	16 April 2026	21:00	RC Strasbourg	Away	0–4		30,631	
