= 2024–25 1. FSV Mainz 05 season =

Mainz 05
2024–25 season
- President: Stefan Hofmann
- Head coach: Bo Henriksen
- Stadium: Mewa Arena
- Bundesliga: 6th
- DFB-Pokal: Second round
- Top goalscorer: League: Jonathan Burkardt (18); All: Jonathan Burkardt (19)
- Average home league attendance: 32,340
- Biggest win: FC St. Pauli 0–3 Mainz 05; Holstein Kiel 0–3 Mainz 05
Home colours	Away colours	Third colours

The 2024–25 season was the 120th season in the history of 1. FSV Mainz 05, and the club's 16th consecutive season in the Bundesliga. In addition to the domestic league, the club participated in the DFB-Pokal.

== Transfers ==
=== In ===
Pos.	Player	Transferred from	Fee	Date	Source
MF	(Japan) Kaishū Sano	(Japan) Kashima Antlers	€2,500,000	3 July 2024	
FW	(Germany) Armindo Sieb	(Germany) Bayern Munich	Loan	2 July 2024	
DF	(Germany) Moritz Jenz	(Germany) VfL Wolfsburg	Loan	28 August 2024	
MF	(South Korea) Hong Hyun-seok	(Belgium) Gent	€4,000,000	29 August 2024	
MF	(Croatia) Gabriel Vidović	(Germany) Bayern Munich	Loan	30 August 2024	

=== Out ===
Pos.	Player	Transferred to	Fee	Date	Source
FW	(Germany) Jessic Ngankam	(Germany) Eintracht Frankfurt	Loan return	30 June 2024	
DF	(Netherlands) Sepp van den Berg	(England) Liverpool	Loan return	30 June 2024	
MF	(Luxembourg) Leandro Barreiro	(Portugal) Benfica	End of contract	1 July 2024	
MF	(France) Josuha Guilavogui	(England) Leeds United	End of contract	1 July 2024	
MF	(Germany) Merveille Papela	(Germany) Darmstadt 98	End of contract	1 July 2024	
FW	(Netherlands) Delano Burgzorg	(England) Middlesbrough		1 July 2024	
FW	(France) Ludovic Ajorque	(France) Brest	Loan	25 July 2024	
DF	(Switzerland) Edimilson Fernandes	(France) Brest	Loan	30 August 2024	
FW	(Austria) Karim Onisiwo	(Austria) Red Bull Salzburg	Undisclosed	2 January 2025	

== Friendlies ==
6 July 2024 Friendly	TSV Langenlonsheim-Laubenheim	0–13	Mainz 05
14:00

12 July 2024 Friendly	Mainz 05	8–0	FC Basara Mainz	Mainz
18:00				Stadium: Bruchwegstadion

18 July 2024 Friendly	Eintracht Trier	3–0	Mainz 05	Morbach
18:00				Stadium: Alfons-Jakob-Stadion

27 July 2024 Friendly	Mainz 05	3–1	Preußen Münster	Mainz
14:00				Stadium: Bruchwegstadion; Attendance: 1,937; Referee: Nicolas Winter

2 August 2024 Friendly	Holstein Kiel	0–2	Mainz 05	Schwaz
15:00				Stadium: Silberstadtarena

10 August 2024 Friendly	Mainz 05	3–1	Montpellier	Mainz
15:30				Stadium: MEWA ARENA

4 September 2024 Friendly	Mainz 05	0–1	Darmstadt 98	Mainz
14:00				Stadium: Bruchwegstadion

9 October 2024 Friendly	Rheinhessen-Auswahl	0–4	Mainz 05	Jugenheim in Rheinhessen
18:00				Stadium: Sportplatz Im Wiesenweg - Jugenheim/Rheinhessen

5 January 2025 Friendly	Eintracht Frankfurt	1–3	Mainz 05
Note: 2 x 60 minutes

== Competitions ==
=== Overall record ===
Competition	First match	Last match	Starting round	Final position	Record							
Competition	First match	Last match	Starting round	Final position	Pld	W	D	L	GF	GA	GD	Win %
Bundesliga	24 August 2024	17 May 2025	Matchday 1	6th	34	14	10	10	55	43	+12	41.18
DFB-Pokal	16 August 2024	30 October 2024	First round	Second round	2	1	0	1	3	5	−2	50.00
Total					36	15	10	11	58	48	+10	41.67

Source: Soccerway

=== Bundesliga ===
==== League table ====
Pos	Team	Pld	W	D	L	GF	GA	GD	Pts	Qualification or relegation
4	Borussia Dortmund	34	17	6	11	71	51	+20	57	Qualification for the Champions League league phase
5	SC Freiburg	34	16	7	11	49	53	−4	55	Qualification for the Europa League league phase
6	Mainz 05	34	14	10	10	55	43	+12	52	Qualification for the Conference League play-off round
7	RB Leipzig	34	13	12	9	53	48	+5	51	
8	Werder Bremen	34	14	9	11	54	57	−3	51	

Source: Bundesliga
Rules for classification: 1) Points; 2) Goal difference; 3) Goals scored; 4) Head-to-head results; 5) Head-to-head away goals scored; 6) Away goals scored; 7) Play-off.
(Rules 4–6 only apply after home and away matches have been played between the tied teams.)

==== Results summary ====
Overall								Home						Away					
Pld	W	D	L	GF	GA	GD	Pts	W	D	L	GF	GA	GD	W	D	L	GF	GA	GD
34	14	10	10	55	43	+12	52	6	8	3	24	18	+6	8	2	7	31	25	+6

Source: DFB

==== Results by round ====
Round	1	2	3	4	5	6	7	8	9	10	11	12	13	14	15	16	17	18	19	20	21	22	23	24	25	26	27	28	29	30	31	32	33	34
Ground	H	A	H	A	H	A	H	H	A	H	A	H	A	H	A	H	A	A	H	A	H	A	H	A	A	H	A	H	A	H	A	H	A	H
Result	D	D	L	W	L	W	L	D	D	W	W	W	L	W	W	W	L	L	W	L	D	W	W	W	W	D	L	D	L	D	L	D	W	D
Position	10	12	15	10	12	10	12	13	13	10	8	7	9	7	5	6	6	6	6	6	7	6	5	4	3	3	4	4	5	6	7	7	6	6

Updated to match(es) played on 26 April 2025. Source: DFB
A = Away; H = Home; W = Win; D = Draw; L = Loss

==== Matches ====
The league schedule was released on 4 July 2024.

24 August 2024 1	Mainz 05	1–1	Union Berlin	Mainz
15:30		Report		Stadium: Mewa Arena; Referee: Harm Osmers

31 August 2024 2	VfB Stuttgart	3–3	Mainz 05	Stuttgart
15:30		Report		Stadium: MHPArena; Attendance: 59,000; Referee: Timo Gerach

15 September 2024 3	Mainz 05	1–2	Werder Bremen	Mainz
17:30		Report		Stadium: Mewa Arena; Referee: Benjamin Brand

20 September 2024 4	FC Augsburg	2–3	Mainz 05	Augsburg
20:30				Stadium: Augsburg Arena; Attendance: 28,913; Referee: Sören Storks

28 September 2024 5	Mainz 05	0–2	1. FC Heidenheim	Mainz
15:30	Hanche-Olsen (yellow card) 6' (yellow-red card) 28'; Jenz (yellow card) 49'; Kohr (yellow card) 61'	Report	Pieringer 15', (yellow card) 77'; Traoré (yellow card) 48'; Mainka (yellow card) 49'; Gimber (yellow card) 56'; Dorsch (red card) 80'; Schöppner 86'	Stadium: Mewa Arena; Attendance: 31,500; Referee: Florian Exner

5 October 2024 6	FC St. Pauli	0–3	Mainz 05	Hamburg
15:30		Report	Burkardt 5', 62'; Sieb 16', (yellow card) 20'; Jenz (yellow card) 79'; Kohr (yellow card) 88'	Stadium: Millerntor-Stadion; Attendance: 29,546; Referee: Christian Dingert

19 October 2024 7	Mainz 05	0–2	RB Leipzig	Mainz
15:30	Nebel (yellow card) 90+1'	Report	Simons 20'; Orbán 37'; Haidara (yellow card) 53'; Vermeeren (yellow card) 60'; Elmas (yellow card) 89'	Stadium: Mewa Arena; Attendance: 30,100; Referee: Felix Zwayer

25 October 2024 8	Mainz 05	1–1	Borussia Mönchengladbach	Mainz
20:30	Lainer 55' (o.g.); Caci (yellow card) 74'; Widmer (yellow card) 89'; Amiri (yellow card) 90+4'	Report	Scally (yellow card) 40'; Kleindienst 57'; Sander (yellow card) 80'	Stadium: Mewa Arena; Attendance: 33,000; Referee: Martin Petersen

3 November 2024 9	SC Freiburg	0–0	Mainz 05	Freiburg
15:30	Sildillia (yellow card) 90+2'	Report	Lee Jae-sung (yellow card) 44'; Bell (yellow card) 70'	Stadium: Europa-Park Stadion; Attendance: 34,400; Referee: Benjamin Brand

9 November 2024 10	Mainz 05	3–1	Borussia Dortmund	Mainz
15:30	Nebel (yellow card) 32', (goal) 54'; Lee Jae-sung 36'; Kohr (yellow card) 45'; Burkardt 45+3'; Zentner (yellow card) 86'	Report	Can (red card) 27'; Schlotterbeck (yellow card) 28'; Guirassy 40' (pen.)	Stadium: Mewa Arena; Attendance: 33,000; Referee: Florian Badstübner

24 November 2024 11	Holstein Kiel	0–3	Mainz 05	Kiel
15:30	Erras (yellow card) 56'	Report	Amiri 11'; Burkardt 37' (pen.); Lee Jae-sung 53'	Stadium: Holstein-Stadion; Attendance: 14,906; Referee: Sascha Stegemann

1 December 2024 12	Mainz 05	2–0	TSG Hoffenheim	Mainz
15:30	Burkardt 4', 24'; Mwene (yellow card) 16'	Report	Kramarić (yellow card) 28'; Kadeřábek (yellow card) 32'; Stach (yellow card) 47'	Stadium: Mewa Arena; Attendance: 30,400; Referee: Daniel Siebert

7 December 2024 13	VfL Wolfsburg	4–3	Mainz 05	Wolfsburg
15:30	Amoura 19'; Baku (yellow card) 21'; Arnold (yellow card) 22'; Tomás 57', (yellow card) 68'; Wind 83', 90+4'	Report	Nebel 11', 66'; Burkardt 39'; Amiri (yellow card) 43'; Lee Jae-sung (yellow card) 45+2'; Kohr (yellow card) 56'; Leitsch (yellow card) 90+1'	Stadium: Volkswagen Arena; Attendance: 20,036; Referee: Timo Gerach

14 December 2024 14	Mainz 05	2–1	Bayern Munich	Mainz
15:30	Lee Jae-sung 41', 60'; Kohr (yellow card) 49'; Mwene (yellow card) 90'	Report	Kimmich (yellow card) 78'; Sané 87'; Laimer (yellow card) 90+5'	Stadium: Mewa Arena; Referee: Frank Willenborg

21 December 2024 15	Eintracht Frankfurt	1–3	Mainz 05	Frankfurt
15:30	Bahoya (yellow card) 64'; Kristensen 75'	Report	Mwene (yellow card) 11'; Santos 15' (o.g.); Amiri (red card) 21'; Nebel 27', 58'	Stadium: Deutsche Bank Park; Attendance: 58,000; Referee: Florian Badstübner

11 January 2025 16	Mainz 05	2–0	VfL Bochum	Mainz
15:30	Burkardt 23', 69'	Report	Hofmann (yellow card) 33'; Sissoko (yellow card) 45+7'	Stadium: Mewa Arena; Attendance: 33,000; Referee: Benjamin Brand

15 January 2025 17	Bayer Leverkusen	1–0	Mainz 05	Leverkusen
20:30	Grimaldo 48'; Mukiele (yellow card) 69'; Xhaka (yellow card) 87'	Report	Sieb (yellow card) 17'; Bell (yellow card) 51'; Caci (yellow card) 68'	Stadium: BayArena; Attendance: 30,210; Referee: Tobias Welz

18 January 2025 18	Union Berlin	2–1	Mainz 05	Berlin
15:30	Hollerbach 1'; Skov 24' (pen.); Kemlein (yellow card) 32'; McKenna (yellow card) 74'; Querfeld (yellow card) 86'	Report	Amiri 5' (pen.); Caci (yellow card) 26'; Bell (yellow card) 32'	Stadium: Stadion An der Alten Försterei; Attendance: 21,646; Referee: Florian Exner

25 January 2025 19	Mainz 05	2–0	VfB Stuttgart	Mainz
15:30 CET	Sano (yellow card) 16'; Weiper 29', (yellow card) 36'; Zentner (yellow card) 41'; Lee Jae-sung (yellow card) 45+2'; Caci 86'	Report	Karazor (yellow card) 56'; Stiller (yellow card) 68'; Chabot (yellow card) 88'	Stadium: Mewa Arena; Attendance: 33,100; Referee: Tobias Stieler

1 February 2025 20	Werder Bremen	1–0	Mainz 05	Bremen
20:30 CET	Ducksch (penalty missed) 12'; Bittencourt 14'; Friedl (yellow card) 26' (yellow-red card) 90+4'; Stark (yellow card) 42' (yellow-red card) 90+3'; Schmid (yellow card) 78'; Zetterer (yellow card) 90+1'; Lynen (yellow card) 90+2'; Weiser (yellow card) 90+8'	Report	Zentner (yellow card) 10'; Caci (yellow card) 44'; Lee Jae-sung (yellow card) 80'	Stadium: Weserstadion; Attendance: 40,500; Referee: Martin Petersen

8 February 2025 21	Mainz 05	0–0	FC Augsburg	Mainz
15:30 CET	Jenz (yellow card) 8'; Weiper (yellow card) 34'; Leitsch (yellow card) 76'	Report	Essende (yellow card) 43'; Zesiger (yellow card) 45+7'; Gouweleeuw (yellow card) 88'	Stadium: Mewa Arena; Attendance: 33,000; Referee: Daniel Schlager

15 February 2025 22	1. FC Heidenheim	0–2	Mainz 05	Heidenheim
19:30 CET	Pieringer (yellow card) 61'	Report	Burkardt 28'; Weiper 49'; Kohr (yellow card) 65'; Caci (yellow card) 71'; Amiri (yellow card) 73'	Stadium: Voith-Arena; Attendance: 15,000; Referee: Felix Byrch

22 February 2025 23	Mainz 05	2–0	FC St. Pauli	Mainz
15:30 CET	Sano (yellow card) 18'; Kohr (yellow card) 50'; Lee Jae-Sung 67'; Nebel (yellow card) 87', (goal) 90+5'	Report	Treu (yellow card) 24'; Van der Heyden (yellow card) 65'; Nemeth (yellow card) 90+4'	Stadium: Mewa Arena; Attendance: 33,305; Referee: Felix Zwayer

1 March 2025 24	RB Leipzig	1–2	Mainz 05	Leipzig
15:30 CET	Simons 1'; Haidara (yellow card) 52'	Report	Amiri 52'; Burkardt 58'; Maloney (yellow card) 88'	Stadium: Red Bull Arena; Attendance: 41,406; Referee: Daniel Siebert

7 March 2025 25	Borussia Mönchengladbach	1–3	Mainz 05	Mönchengladbach
20:30 CET	Lainer 73'	Report	Nebel 39'; Kohr 48'; Amiri 77'; Sano (yellow card) 90+2'	Stadium: Borussia-Park; Attendance: 51,749; Referee: Sascha Stegemann

15 March 2025 26	Mainz 05	2–2	SC Freiburg	Mainz
15:30 CEST	Mwene (yellow card) 27'; Burkardt 34'; Kohr (red card) 43'; Hanche-Olsen 74'	Report	Adamu (yellow card) 2'; Gregoritsch 58'; Kübler 79'; Höler (yellow card) 87'	Stadium: Mewa Arena; Attendance: 33,305; Referee: Benjamin Brand

29 March 2025 27	Borussia Dortmund	3–1	Mainz 05	Dortmund
17:30 CEST	Beier 39', 72'; Can 42'; Couto (yellow card) 45'; Schlotterbeck (yellow card) 89'	Report	Nebel 76'	Stadium: Signal Iduna Park; Attendance: 81,365; Referee: Daniel Schlager

5 April 2025 28	Mainz 05	1–1	Holstein Kiel	Mainz
15:30 CEST	Mwene (yellow card) 33'; Weiper 75'; Jenz (yellow card) 84'; Amiri (yellow card) 90+1'	Report	Bernhardsson 34'; Zec (yellow card) 44'; Remberg (yellow card) 51'; Becker (yellow card) 85'; Rosenboom (yellow card) 90+1'	Stadium: Mewa Arena; Attendance: 32,500; Referee: Frank Willenborg

12 April 2025 29	TSG Hoffenheim	2–0	Mainz 05	Sinsheim
15:30 CEST	Kramarić 4', 32'; Chaves (yellow card) 23'; Nsoki (yellow card) 45+2'; Bischof (yellow card) 75'; Baumann (yellow card) 90+3'	Report	Nebel (yellow card) 49' (yellow-red card) 90+4'	Stadium: PreZero Arena; Attendance: 30,150; Referee: Sven Jablonski

19 April 2025 30	Mainz 05	2–2	VfL Wolfsburg	Mainz
15:30 CEST	Lee Jae-sung 37'; Kohr 40', (yellow card) 51'; Veratschnig (yellow card) 67'	Report	Arnold 3'; Tomás (yellow card) 68'; Vavro 89', (yellow card) 90+3'; Mæhle (yellow card) 90'	Stadium: Mewa Arena; Attendance: 31,500; Referee: Felix Zwayer

26 April 2025 31	Bayern Munich	3–0	Mainz 05	Munich
15:30 CEST	Sané 27'; Olise 40'; Kane (yellow card) 45+1'; Dier 84'; Laimer (yellow card) 86'	Report	Mwene (yellow card) 36'; Amiri (yellow card) 89'	Stadium: Allianz Arena; Attendance: 75,000; Referee: Bastian Dankert

3 May 2025 32	Mainz 05	1–1	Eintracht Frankfurt	Mainz
				Stadium: Mewa Arena

10 May 2025 33	VfL Bochum	1–4	Mainz 05	Bochum
				Stadium: Vonovia Ruhrstadion

17 May 2025 34	Mainz 05	2–2	Bayer Leverkusen	Mainz
				Stadium: Mewa Arena

=== DFB-Pokal ===
16 August 2024 First round	Wehen Wiesbaden	1–3 (a.e.t.)	Mainz 05	Wiesbaden
18:00 CEST (UTC+2)	Gözüsirin 14'	Report	Kohr 59'; Burkardt 113'; Amiri 120+1'	Stadium: Brita-Arena

30 October 2024 Second round	Mainz 05	0–4	Bayern Munich	Mainz
20:45 CET (UTC+1)	Kohr (yellow card) 19'; Jenz (yellow card) 45+3'; Nebel (yellow card) 64'	Report	Musiala 2', 37', 45+4'; Laimer (yellow card) 43'; Sané 45+1'	Stadium: Mewa Arena; Attendance: 33,305; Referee: Sascha Stegemann
