= 2022–23 1. FSV Mainz 05 season =

1. FSV Mainz 05
2022–23 season
- President: Stefan Hofmann
- Manager: Christian Heidel
- Head coach: Bo Svensson
- Stadium: Mewa Arena
- Bundesliga: 9th
- DFB-Pokal: Round of 16
- Top goalscorer: League: Marcus Ingvartsen (10); All: Marcus Ingvartsen (12)
Home colours	Away colours	Third colours

The 2022–23 season was the 118th season in the history of 1. FSV Mainz 05 and their 14th consecutive season in the top flight. The club participated in the Bundesliga and the DFB-Pokal.

== Players ==
As of 5 September 2022

No.	Pos.	Nation	Player
1	GK	GER	Finn Dahmen
3	DF	ESP	Aarón Martín
4	MF	MAR	Aymen Barkok
5	DF	GER	Maxim Leitsch
6	MF	GER	Anton Stach
7	MF	KOR	Lee Jae-sung
8	MF	LUX	Leandro Barreiro
9	FW	AUT	Karim Onisiwo
10	MF	FRA	Angelo Fulgini
11	FW	DEN	Marcus Ingvartsen
16	DF	GER	Stefan Bell
17	MF	GER	Niklas Tauer
19	DF	FRA	Anthony Caci
20	MF	SUI	Edimilson Fernandes

No.	Pos.	Nation	Player
21	DF	GER	Danny da Costa
27	GK	GER	Robin Zentner (vice-captain)
29	FW	GER	Jonathan Burkardt
30	DF	SUI	Silvan Widmer (captain)
31	MF	GER	Dominik Kohr
32	GK	GER	Lasse Rieß
36	FW	AUT	Marlon Mustapha
37	FW	NED	Delano Burgzorg
38	FW	GER	Ben Bobzien
41	MF	GER	Eniss Shabani
42	DF	GER	Alexander Hack
44	FW	GER	Nelson Weiper
—	MF	GER	Philipp Schulz

== Transfers ==
=== In ===
Pos.	Player	Transferred from	Fee	Date	Source
DF	(Germany) Danny da Costa	Eintracht Frankfurt	Free	1 July 2022	
MF	(Morocco) Aymen Barkok	Eintracht Frankfurt	Free	1 July 2022	
DF	(France) Anthony Caci	(France) RC Strasbourg	Free	1 July 2022	
MF	(Germany) Dominik Kohr	Eintracht Frankfurt	€1.5m	1 July 2022	
MF	(Netherlands) Delano Burgzorg	(Netherlands) Heracles Almelo	€2m	1 July 2022	
FW	(Denmark) Marcus Ingvartsen	Union Berlin	€2.3m	1 July 2022	
DF	(Germany) Maxim Leitsch	VfL Bochum	€3.5m	1 July 2022	
DF	(France) Angelo Fulgini	(France) Angers SCO	€6m	12 July 2022	
DF	(Norway) Andreas Hanche-Olsen	(Belgium) KAA Gent	€2.5m	13 January 2023	
FW	(France) Ludovic Ajorque	(France) RC Strasbourg	€6m	24 January 2023	

=== Out ===
Pos.	Player	Transferred from	Fee	Date	Source
DF	(Germany) Jonathan Meier	Dynamo Dresden	€200,000	1 July 2022	
DF	(Belgium) Dimitri Lavalée	(Belgium) KV Mechelen	€750,000	1 July 2022	
MF	(Austria) David Nemeth	FC St. Pauli	€1.3m	1 July 2022	
DF	(Netherlands) Jerry St. Juste	(Portugal) Sporting CP	€10m	1 July 2022	
DF	(Germany) Luca Kilian	1. FC Köln	€2m	1 July 2022	
DF	(Netherlands) Moussa Niakhaté	(England) Nottingham Forest	€10m	6 July 2022	
MF	(France) Angelo Fulgini	(France) RC Lens	Loan	31 January 2023	

== Pre-season and friendlies ==
Win Draw Loss Fixtures

2 July 2022 Friendly	Wormatia Worms	0–4	Mainz 05	Guntersblum, Germany
14:00 CEST (UTC+2)		Report	Bobzien 49' (pen.); Mustapha (penalty missed) 47', 54'; Schmidt 76'; Kohr 86'	Stadium: Guntersblum Rasenplatz; Attendance: 1,600; Referee: Daniel Greef

15 July 2022 Friendly	Mainz 05	0–1	Beşiktaş	Kufstein, Germany
20:15 CEST (UTC+2)		Report	Tosun 24'	Stadium: Kufstein-Arena; Attendance: 1,500; Referee: Michael Egger (Austria)

18 July 2022 Friendly	Mainz 05	1–0	Newcastle United	Kufstein, Germany
16:00 CEST (UTC+2)	Burgzorg 58'; Papela (yellow card) 74'	Report		Stadium: Kufstein-Arena; Attendance: 500; Referee: Patrick Elsier (Austria)

23 July 2022 Friendly	Mainz 05	1–1	Athletic Bilbao	Mainz, Germany
17:00 CEST (UTC+2)	Fernandes 120+1'	Report	N. Williams 40'	Stadium: Mewa Arena; Attendance: 5,300; Referee: Patrick Alt (Germany)
Note: Match was played in two 60-minute halves.

28 August 2022 Friendly	Mainz 05	0–1	Wehen Wiesbaden	Mainz, Germany
11:00 CEST (UTC+2)		Report	Prtajin 66' (pen.)	Stadium: Mewa Arena

22 September 2022 Friendly	Mainz 05	2–5	Karlsruher SC	Mainz, Germany
14:00 CEST (UTC+2)	Burgzorg 30'; Shabani 90'	Report	Wanitzek 2'; Jung 17'; Kaufmann 34'; Ballas 44'; Arase 74'	Stadium: Bruchwegstadion; Referee: Tim Waldinger

10 December 2022 Friendly	Mallorca	2–2	Mainz 05	Palma
12:30 CET (UTC+1)	Ndiaye 1'; Muriqi 38'		Barkok 20' (pen.); Da Costa 52'	Stadium: Estadi Son Bibiloni; Referee: Miguel Domato

10 January 2023 Friendly	Luzern	1–5	Mainz 05	Lucerne, Switzerland
15:00 CET (UTC+1)	Campo 106'		Barreiro 2'; Martín 45'; Bobzien 72' (pen.); Lee Jae-sung 74'; Rupil 81'	Stadium: Swissporarena
Note: Match was played in two 60-minute halves.

14 January 2023 Friendly	Mainz 05	2–2	1899 Hoffenheim	Mainz, Germany
14:00 CET (UTC+1)	Fulgini 28'; Barreiro 106'		Che 57'; Dabbur 138'	Stadium: Stadion am Bruchweg
Note: Match was played in two 70-minute halves.

== Competitions ==
=== Overall record ===
Competition	First match	Last match	Starting round	Final position	Record							
Competition	First match	Last match	Starting round	Final position	Pld	W	D	L	GF	GA	GD	Win %
Bundesliga	6 August 2022	27 May 2023	Matchday 1	9th	34	12	10	12	54	55	−1	35.29
DFB-Pokal	31 July 2022	1 February 2023	First round	Round of 16	3	2	0	1	6	4	+2	66.67
Total					37	14	10	13	60	59	+1	37.84

Source: Soccerway

=== Bundesliga ===
==== League table ====
Pos	Team	Pld	W	D	L	GF	GA	GD	Pts	Qualification or relegation
7	Eintracht Frankfurt	34	13	11	10	58	52	+6	50	Qualification for the Europa Conference League play-off round (Note: Since the 2022–23 DFB-Pokal winners, RB Leipzig, qualified for the Champions League based on league position, the Europa League group stage spot was passed to the sixth-placed team, and the Europa Conference League play-off round spot was passed to the seventh-placed team.)
8	VfL Wolfsburg	34	13	10	11	57	48	+9	49	
9	Mainz 05	34	12	10	12	54	55	−1	46	
10	Borussia Mönchengladbach	34	11	10	13	52	55	−3	43	
11	1. FC Köln	34	10	12	12	49	54	−5	42	

Source: DFB
Rules for classification: 1) Points; 2) Goal difference; 3) Goals scored; 4) Head-to-head results; 5) Head-to-head away goals scored; 6) Away goals scored; 7) Play-off.

==== Results summary ====
Overall								Home						Away					
Pld	W	D	L	GF	GA	GD	Pts	W	D	L	GF	GA	GD	W	D	L	GF	GA	GD
34	12	10	12	54	55	−1	46	6	6	5	31	25	+6	6	4	7	23	30	−7

Source: DFB

==== Results by round ====
Round	1	2	3	4	5	6	7	8	9	10	11	12	13	14	15	16	17	18	19	20	21	22	23	24	25	26	27	28	29	30	31	32	33	34
Ground	A	H	A	H	A	A	H	A	H	A	H	A	H	A	H	A	H	H	A	H	A	H	H	A	H	A	H	A	H	A	H	A	H	A
Result	W	D	W	L	W	L	D	L	D	W	W	L	L	L	D	D	L	W	L	W	W	W	W	D	D	W	D	D	W	L	L	L	L	D
Position	6	6	4	7	5	6	8	12	12	11	6	9	10	11	10	12	12	11	12	12	9	8	7	7	9	8	8	8	7	8	8	9	9	9

Source: DFB
A = Away; H = Home; W = Win; D = Draw; L = Loss

==== Matches ====
The league fixtures were announced on 17 June 2022.

6 August 2022 1	VfL Bochum	1–2	Mainz 05	Bochum
15:30 CEST (UTC+2)	Stafylidis (yellow card) 13'; Stöger 39'; Ganvoula (yellow card) 90+3'	Report	Onisiwo 26', 77'; Stach (yellow card) 33'; Bell (yellow card) 64'; Burgzorg (yellow card) 84'	Stadium: Vonovia Ruhrstadion; Attendance: 24,110; Referee: Felix Zwayer

14 August 2022 2	Mainz 05	0–0	Union Berlin	Mainz
15:30 CEST (UTC+2)	Onisiwo (yellow card) 5'	Report		Stadium: Mewa Arena; Attendance: 25,009; Referee: Daniel Schlager

20 August 2022 3	FC Augsburg	1–2	Mainz 05	Augsburg
15:30 CEST (UTC+2)	Gouweleeuw (yellow card) 3'; Rexhbeçaj (yellow card) 29'; Demirović 35'	Report	Bell (yellow card) 29'; Onisiwo 31'; Martín (penalty missed) 62'; Burkardt (yellow card) 62'; Lee Jae-sung 90+3'	Stadium: WWK Arena; Attendance: 23,755; Referee: Sascha Stegemann

27 August 2022 4	Mainz 05	0–3	Bayer Leverkusen	Mainz
15:30 CEST (UTC+2)	Burgzorg (yellow card) 70'	Report	Hincapié (yellow card) 3' (yellow-red card) 77'; Palacios 29'; Frimpong 39', 41', (yellow card) 60'; Andrich (yellow card) 45'; Bakker (yellow card) 77' (yellow-red card) 90+4'	Stadium: Mewa Arena; Attendance: 28,500; Referee: Christian Dingert

4 September 2022 5	Borussia Mönchengladbach	0–1	Mainz 05	Mönchengladbach
17:30 CEST (UTC+2)	Koné (yellow card) 26'; Itakura (red card) 53'	Report	Barreiro (yellow card) 39'; Lee Jae-sung (yellow card) 42'; Martín 55'; Kohr (yellow card) 88'; Zentner (yellow card) 90+5'	Stadium: Borussia-Park; Attendance: 51,210; Referee: Deniz Aytekin

10 September 2022 6	1899 Hoffenheim	4–1	Mainz 05	Hoffenheim
15:30 CEST (UTC+2)	Baumgartner (yellow card) 9'; Akpoguma (yellow card) 10'; Kramarić 53'; Vogt (yellow card) 66'; Prömel 69'; Dabbur 80'; Kadeřábek 90+2'	Report	Hack (red card) 41'; Kohr 83'; Onisiwo (yellow card) 85'; Bell (yellow card) 87'	Stadium: Rhein-Neckar-Arena; Attendance: 20,114; Referee: Daniel Schlager

16 September 2022 7	Mainz 05	1–1	Hertha BSC	Mainz
20:30 CEST (UTC+2)	Kohr (yellow card) 40'; Mustapha (yellow card) 67'; Onisiwo (yellow card) 74'; Caci 90+4'	Report	Tousart 30'; Plattenhardt (yellow card) 48'; Lukebakio (yellow card) 58'; Dárdai (yellow card) 64'; Boëtius (yellow card) 65'; Christensen (yellow card) 90+4'	Stadium: Mewa Arena; Attendance: 25,300; Referee: Frank Willenborg

1 October 2022 8	SC Freiburg	2–1	Mainz 05	Freiburg
15:30 CEST (UTC+2)	Gregoritsch 3'; Kyereh 37'; Höfler (yellow card) 70'; Keitel (yellow card) 90+4'	Report	Bell (yellow card) 33'; Martín 52'; Barreiro (yellow card) 53'; Stach (yellow card) 60'; Kohr (yellow card) 90'	Stadium: Europa-Park Stadion; Attendance: 34,700; Referee: Sven Jablonski

8 October 2022 9	Mainz 05	1–1	RB Leipzig	Mainz
15:30 CEST (UTC+2)	Ingvartsen 45'; Hack (yellow card) 77'	Report	Forsberg (yellow card) 62'; Nkunku 80'	Stadium: Mewa Arena; Attendance: 26,100; Referee: Felix Brych

15 October 2022 10	Werder Bremen	0–2	Mainz 05	Bremen
15:30 CEST (UTC+2)	Füllkrug (yellow card) 90+2'	Report	Ingvartsen 36'; Hack (yellow card) 45'; Lee Jae-sung 66'; Burkardt (yellow card) 90'	Stadium: Weserstadion; Attendance: 41,000; Referee: Robert Hartmann

21 October 2022 11	Mainz 05	5–0	1. FC Köln	Mainz
20:30 CEST (UTC+2)	Ingvartsen 11' (pen.); Kohr 35', (yellow card) 35'; Stach 40'; Martín 73'; Onisiwo 83'	Report	Kilian (yellow card) 10' (yellow-red card) 28'; Uth (yellow card) 35'; Soldo (yellow card) 50'; Martel (yellow card) 72'	Stadium: Mewa Arena; Attendance: 31,610; Referee: Matthias Jöllenbeck

29 October 2022 12	Bayern Munich	6–2	Mainz 05	Munich
15:30 CEST (UTC+2)	Gnabry 5'; Musiala 28'; Mané (penalty missed) 43', 43'; Goretzka 58'; Tel 79'; Choupo-Moting 86'; Pavard (yellow card) 88'	Report	Fernandes (yellow card) 34'; Burkardt (penalty missed) 45+3'; Widmer 45+4'; Ingvartsen 82'	Stadium: Allianz Arena; Attendance: 75,000; Referee: Benjamin Cortus

5 November 2022 13	Mainz 05	0–3	VfL Wolfsburg	Mainz
15:30 CET (UTC+2)	Stach (yellow card) 75'	Report	Wimmer 33'; Arnold 70'; Baku (yellow card) 53' (goal) 84'	Stadium: Mewa Arena; Attendance: 26,750; Referee: Daniel Siebert

9 November 2022 14	Schalke 04	1–0	Mainz 05	Gelsenkirchen
20:30 CET (UTC+1)	Terodde 10'; Mollet (yellow card) 21'; Yoshida (yellow card) 57'; Karaman (yellow card) 69'	Report	Fernandes (yellow card) 67'	Stadium: Veltins-Arena; Attendance: 58,256; Referee: Tobias Reichel

13 November 2022 15	Mainz 05	1–1	Eintracht Frankfurt	Mainz
15:30 CET (UTC+1)	Burkardt 40'; Bell (yellow card) 45+1'; Martín (yellow card) 58'	Report	Tuta (yellow card) 38'; Kolo Muani 67', (yellow card) 75'	Stadium: Mewa Arena; Attendance: 33,305; Referee: Robert Schröder

21 January 2023 16	VfB Stuttgart	1–1	Mainz 05	Stuttgart
15:30 CET (UTC+1)	Guirassy 36'; Silas (yellow card) 70'	Report	Ingvartsen 40' (pen.); Kohr (yellow card) 62'; Barreiro (yellow card) 79'; Fulgini (yellow card) 90+1'	Stadium: Mercedes-Benz Arena; Attendance: 45,903; Referee: Felix Brych

25 January 2023 17	Mainz 05	1–2	Borussia Dortmund	Mainz
18:30 CET (UTC+1)	Lee Jae-sung 2', (yellow card) 34'; Fernandes (yellow card) 76'	Report	Ryerson 4'; Reyna 90+3'	Stadium: Mewa Arena; Attendance: 31,500; Referee: Sascha Stegemann

28 January 2023 18	Mainz 05	5–2	VfL Bochum	Mainz
15:30 CET (UTC+1)	Lee Jae-sung 1'; Widmer 17'; Onisiwo 28', 57', 87'	Report	Kunde 70'; Mašović 72'; Schlotterbeck (yellow card) 81'	Stadium: Mewa Arena; Attendance: 23,300; Referee: Patrick Ittrich

4 February 2023 19	Union Berlin	2–1	Mainz 05	Berlin
15:30 CET (UTC+1)	Behrens 32'; Seguin (yellow card) 72'; Pefok 84'	Report	Ajorque (yellow card) 45'; Ingvartsen 78' (pen.)	Stadium: Stadion An der Alten Försterei; Attendance: 22,012; Referee: Florian Badstübner

11 February 2023 20	Mainz 05	3–1	FC Augsburg	Mainz
15:30 CET (UTC+1)	Lee Jae-sung 21', 52'; Onisiwo 24'; Stach (yellow card) 34'	Report	Demirović 28' (pen.); Gumny (yellow card) 33'	Stadium: Mewa Arena; Attendance: 22,200; Referee: Sven Jablonski

19 February 2023 21	Bayer Leverkusen	2–3	Mainz 05	Leverkusen
19:30 CET (UTC+1)	Tapsoba (penalty missed) 23'; Amiri 32'; Schick 58'; Hincapié (yellow card) 62'; Adli (red card) 81'; Frimpong (yellow card) 83'; Tah (yellow card) 87'; Hložek (yellow card) 88'; Andrich (yellow card) 88'	Report	Caci 26'; Bell (yellow card) 45'; Barreiro 45+4', (yellow card) 79'; Hanche-Olsen (yellow card) 55'; Ingvartsen 82' (pen.); Kohr (yellow card) 87'	Stadium: BayArena; Attendance: 27,002; Referee: Robert Schröder

24 February 2023 22	Mainz 05	4–0	Borussia Mönchengladbach	Mainz
20:30 CET (UTC+1)	Lee Jae-sung 25'; Caci (yellow card) 36'; Ingvartsen 49'; Hanche-Olsen (yellow card) 50'; Ajorque 72'; Weiper 90+3'	Report	Stindl (yellow card) 66'; Pléa (yellow card) 74'; Koné (yellow card) 83'	Stadium: Mewa Arena; Attendance: 32,500; Referee: Robert Hartmann

4 March 2023 23	Mainz 05	1–0	1899 Hoffenheim	Mainz
15:30 CET (UTC+1)	Barreiro 33'; Barkok (yellow card) 90+2'	Report	Geiger (yellow card) 66'; Rudy (yellow card) 81'; Baumgartner (yellow card) 85'; Vogt (yellow card) 90'	Stadium: Mewa Arena; Attendance: 28,100; Referee: Sascha Stegemann

11 March 2023 24	Hertha BSC	1–1	Mainz 05	Berlin
15:30 CET (UTC+1)	Ngankam 18' (pen.); Ciğerci (yellow card) 22'; Tousart (yellow card) 66'	Report	Hanche-Olsen (yellow card) 52'; Ajorque 57'	Stadium: Olympiastadion; Attendance: 41,689; Referee: Benjamin Cortus

19 March 2023 25	Mainz 05	1–1	SC Freiburg	Mainz
19:30 CET (UTC+1)	Ajorque (yellow card) 57'; Caci (yellow card) 88'; Onisiwo 90+6'	Report	Ginter (yellow card) 35'; Gulde (yellow card) 51'; Dōan 55'	Stadium: Mewa Arena; Attendance: 26,800; Referee: Bastian Dankert

1 April 2023 26	RB Leipzig	0–3	Mainz 05	Leipzig
15:30 CEST (UTC+2)	Kampl (yellow card) 37'; Olmo (yellow card) 65'; Orbán (yellow card) 65'	Report	Ingvartsen 9', (yellow card) 64'; Ajorque 57'; Caci (yellow card) 61'; Hanche-Olsen (yellow card) 65'; Kohr 67'	Stadium: Red Bull Arena; Attendance: 45,597; Referee: Christian Dingert

8 April 2023 27	Mainz 05	2–2	Werder Bremen	Mainz
15:30 CEST (UTC+2)	Onisiwo (yellow card) 65'; Ajorque 85'; Weiper 90+3'	Report	Groß (yellow card) 28'; Stage (yellow card) 42', (goal) 87'; Ducksch (yellow card) 59'; Gruev (yellow card) 81'; Stark (yellow card) 83'; Füllkrug 90+5'	Stadium: Mewa Arena; Attendance: 33,305; Referee: Benjamin Brand

15 April 2023 28	1. FC Köln	1–1	Mainz 05	Cologne
15:30 CEST (UTC+2)	Kainz (yellow card) 8'; Ljubičić 51'; Hübers (yellow card) 86'; Thielmann (yellow card) 90+2'	Report	Ajorque 17', (yellow card) 34'; Kohr (yellow card) 90+2'	Stadium: RheinEnergieStadion; Attendance: 50,000; Referee: Benjamin Cortus

22 April 2023 29	Mainz 05	3–1	Bayern Munich	Mainz
15:30 CEST (UTC+2)	Martín (yellow card) 57', (goal) 79'; Kohr (yellow card) 60'; Ajorque 65'; Barreiro 73'	Report	Mané 29'	Stadium: Mewa Arena; Attendance: 33,305; Referee: Felix Zwayer

30 April 2023 30	VfL Wolfsburg	3–0	Mainz 05	Wolfsburg
17:30 CEST (UTC+2)	Wind 5', 28'; Bornauw 13', (yellow card) 86'	Report	Bell (yellow card) 45'; Kohr (yellow card) 54'; Martín (yellow card) 66'	Stadium: Volkswagen Arena; Attendance: 23,817; Referee: Daniel Siebert

5 May 2023 31	Mainz 05	2–3	Schalke 04	Mainz
20:30 CEST (UTC+2)	Ajorque (yellow card) 40'; Barreiro 53', (yellow card) 90+14'; Martín 70'; Caci (yellow card) 90+11'; Kohr (yellow card) 90+14'	Report	Bülter 26', 90+10' (pen.); Krauß 60'; Drexler (yellow card) 90+14'	Stadium: Mewa Arena; Attendance: 33,305; Referee: Matthias Jöllenbeck

13 May 2023 32	Eintracht Frankfurt	3–0	Mainz 05	Frankfurt
15:30 CEST (UTC+2)	Kamada 18' (pen.); Tuta (yellow card) 30'; Buta 40'; Kolo Muani 59'	Report	Bell (yellow card) 22'; Hanche-Olsen (yellow card) 38'; Shabani (yellow card) 88'	Stadium: Deutsche Bank Park; Attendance: 50,000; Referee: Felix Brych

21 May 2023 33	Mainz 05	1–4	VfB Stuttgart	Mainz
15:30 CEST (UTC+2)	Ingvartsen 23'; Kohr (yellow card) 61'; Bell (yellow card) 75'; Ajorque (yellow card) 90+5'	Report	Endo 41', (yellow card) 73'; Guirassy 64'; Führich 78'; Coulibaly 90+1'	Stadium: Mewa Arena; Attendance: 33,305; Referee: Sven Jablonski

27 May 2023 34	Borussia Dortmund	2–2	Mainz 05	Dortmund
15:30 CEST (UTC+2)	Haller (penalty missed) 19'; Guerreiro (yellow card) 40', (goal) 69'; Süle 90+6'	Report	Hanche-Olsen 15'; Onisiwo 24'; Fernandes (yellow card) 71'	Stadium: Signal Iduna Park; Attendance: 81,365; Referee: Marco Fritz

=== DFB-Pokal ===
31 July 2022 First round	Erzgebirge Aue	0–3	Mainz 05	Aue-Bad Schlema
18:01 CEST (UTC+2)	Sorge (yellow card) 50'; Nazarov (yellow card) 61'	Report	Martín (yellow card) 14'; Kohr 41', (yellow card) 51'; Stach (yellow card) 55'; Burgzorg 70', (yellow card) 74'; Ingvartsen 78' (pen.)	Stadium: Erzgebirgsstadion; Attendance: 15,500; Referee: Deniz Aytekin

18 October 2022 Second round	VfB Lübeck	0–3	Mainz 05	Lübeck
18:00 CEST (UTC+2)	Grupe (yellow card) 38'	Report	Fulgini (yellow card) 9'; Hack 16'; Martín (yellow card) 28'; Ingvartsen 43'; Barkok 88'	Stadium: Stadion Lohmühle; Attendance: 9,974; Referee: Robin Braun

1 February 2023 Round of 16	Mainz 05	0–4	Bayern Munich	Mainz
20:45 CET (UTC+1)	Widmer (yellow card) 24'; Hack (yellow card) 49' (yellow-red card) 86'	Report	Choupo-Moting 17'; Musiala 30'; Müller (yellow card) 38'; Sané 44'; Davies 83'	Stadium: Mewa Arena; Attendance: 33,305; Referee: Deniz Aytekin
