= 2021–22 1. FSV Mainz 05 season =

1. FSV Mainz 05
2021–22 season
- President: Stefan Hofmann
- Head coach: Bo Svensson
- Stadium: Mewa Arena
- Bundesliga: 8th
- DFB-Pokal: Round of 16
- Top goalscorer: League: Jonathan Burkardt (11); All: Jonathan Burkardt (14)
Home colours	Away colours	Third colours

The 2021–22 season was the 117th season in the existence of 1. FSV Mainz 05 and the club's 13th consecutive season in the top flight of German football. In addition to the domestic league, Mainz participated in this season's edition of the DFB-Pokal.

== Players ==
=== First-team squad ===
As of 22 February 2022

No.	Pos.	Nation	Player
1	GK	GER	Finn Dahmen
3	DF	ESP	Aarón Martín
4	DF	NED	Jerry St. Juste
5	MF	NED	Jean-Paul Boëtius
6	MF	GER	Anton Stach
7	MF	KOR	Lee Jae-sung
8	MF	LUX	Leandro Barreiro
9	FW	AUT	Karim Onisiwo
11	FW	DEN	Marcus Ingvartsen (on loan from Union Berlin)
16	DF	GER	Stefan Bell
18	DF	GER	Daniel Brosinski
19	DF	FRA	Moussa Niakhaté (captain)
22	MF	AUT	Kevin Stöger
23	DF	ANG	Anderson Lucoqui
24	MF	GER	Merveille Papela

No.	Pos.	Nation	Player
25	MF	GER	Niklas Tauer
26	MF	GER	Paul Nebel
27	GK	GER	Robin Zentner (vice-captain)
29	FW	GER	Jonathan Burkardt
30	DF	SUI	Silvan Widmer
31	MF	GER	Dominik Kohr (on loan from Eintracht Frankfurt)
32	GK	GER	Lasse Rieß
33	GK	ISR	Omer Hanin
34	DF	AUT	David Nemeth
35	MF	GER	Stephan Fürstner
36	MF	JPN	Kaito Mizuta
37	FW	NED	Delano Burgzorg (on loan from Heracles Almelo)
38	FW	GER	Ben Bobzien
42	DF	GER	Alexander Hack
43	MF	GER	Romario Rösch

=== Out on loan ===
Note: Flags indicate national team as defined under FIFA eligibility rules; some limited exceptions apply. Players may hold more than one non-FIFA nationality.

No.	Pos.	Nation	Player
—	DF	FRA	Ronaël Pierre-Gabriel (at (France) Brest until 30 June 2022)
—	DF	GER	Luca Kilian (at (Germany) FC Köln until 30 June 2022)
—	DF	BEL	Dimitri Lavalée (at (Belgium) Sint-Truiden until 30 June 2022)
—	FW	FRA	Jean-Philippe Mateta (at (England) Crystal Palace until 30 June 2022)
—	DF	GER	Jonathan Meier (at (Germany) Hansa Rostock until 30 June 2022)

No.	Pos.	Nation	Player
—	MF	SUI	Edimilson Fernandes (at (Switzerland) Young Boys until 30 June 2022)
—	FW	GHA	Abass Issah (at (Croatia) Rijeka until 30 June 2022)
—	FW	AUT	Marlon Mustapha (at (Austria) Admira Wacker until 30 June 2022)

== Transfers ==
=== Out ===
Date	Pos.	Name	To	Fee	Ref.
1 June 2021	DF	Phillipp Mwene (AUT)	PSV (NED)	Free	
1 June 2021	MF	Danny Latza (GER)	Schalke 04 (GER)	Free	
1 June 2021	MF	Levin Öztunali (GER)	Union Berlin (GER)	Free	
10 June 2021	FW	Marlon Mustapha (AUT)	Admira Wacker Mödling (AUT)	Loan	
10 June 2021	GK	Florian Muller (GER)	VFB Stuttgart (GER)	€5 million	
23 June 2021	MF	Pierre Kunde (CMR)	Olympiacos F.C. (GRE)	Undisclosed	
29 June 2021	MF	Issah Abass (GHA)	NK Rijeka (CRO)	Loan	
8 July 2021	FW	Ji Dong-Won (KOR)	FC Seoul (KOR)	Undisclosed	
9 July 2021	FW	Robin Quaison (SWE)	Al-Ettifaq (KSA)	Undisclosed	
14 August 2021	DF	Jonathan Maier (GER)	Hansa Rostock (GER)	Loan	
25 August 2021	DF	Luca Kilian (GER)	1. FC Köln (GER)	Loan	

== Pre-season and friendlies ==
Win Draw Loss Fixtures

9 July 2021 Friendly	Mainz 05	2–1	Würzburger Kickers	Mainz, Germany
16:15 CEST (UTC+2)	St. Juste 21'; Boëtius 29'	Report	Sané 15'	Stadium: Opel Arena; Attendance: 500; Referee: Timo Gerach

23 July 2021 Friendly	Mainz 05	0–1	Liverpool	Grödig, Austria
18:15 CEST (UTC+2)		Report	Kilian 86' (o.g.)	Stadium: Untersberg-Arena; Attendance: 3,500

27 July 2021 Friendly	Mainz 05	1–0	Gaziantep	St. Johann in Tirol, Austria
18:00 CEST (UTC+2)	Niakhaté 45+1'			Stadium: Koasastadion

31 July 2021 Friendly	Mainz 05	3–2	Genoa	Mainz, Germany
17:30 CEST (UTC+2)	Burkardt 8'; Boëtius 49'; Szalai 96'	Report	Buksa 30'; Bianchi 77' (pen.)	Stadium: Opel Arena; Attendance: 3,000; Referee: Nicolas Winter
Note: The match was played in four quarters 30 minutes each.

2 September 2021 Friendly	Mainz 05	0–0	Karlsruher SC	Mainz, Germany
13:00 CEST (UTC+2)		Report		Stadium: Bruchwegstadion; Attendance: 200; Referee: Robert Kampka

9 October 2021 Charity match	Mainz 05	1–1	1. FC Kaiserslautern	Koblenz, Germany
14:00 CEST (UTC+2)	Schmidt 86'	Report	Huth 22'; Dahmen (red card) 88'	Stadium: Stadion Oberwerth; Attendance: 1,500; Referee: Mike Pickel

27 January 2022 Friendly	Mainz 05	0–1	Eintracht Frankfurt	Mainz, Germany
14:00 CET (UTC+1)		Report	Tuta 74'	Stadium: Bruchwegstadion

== Competitions ==
=== Overall record ===
Competition	First match	Last match	Starting round	Final position	Record							
Competition	First match	Last match	Starting round	Final position	Pld	W	D	L	GF	GA	GD	Win %
Bundesliga	15 August 2021	14 May 2022	Matchday 1	8th	34	13	7	14	50	45	+5	38.24
DFB-Pokal	8 August 2021	18 January 2022	First round	Round of 16	3	1	1	1	6	7	−1	33.33
Total					37	14	8	15	56	52	+4	37.84

Source: Soccerway

=== Bundesliga ===
==== League table ====
Pos	Team	Pld	W	D	L	GF	GA	GD	Pts	Qualification or relegation
6	SC Freiburg	34	15	10	9	58	46	+12	55	Qualification for the Europa League group stage (Note: Since the 2021–22 DFB-Pokal winners, RB Leipzig, qualified for the Champions League based on league position, the Europa League group stage spot was passed to the sixth-placed team, and the Europa Conference League play-off round spot was passed to the seventh-placed team.)
7	1. FC Köln	34	14	10	10	52	49	+3	52	Qualification for the Europa Conference League play-off round
8	Mainz 05	34	13	7	14	50	45	+5	46	
9	1899 Hoffenheim	34	13	7	14	58	60	−2	46	
10	Borussia Mönchengladbach	34	12	9	13	54	61	−7	45	

Source: DFB
Rules for classification: 1) Points; 2) Goal difference; 3) Goals scored; 4) Head-to-head results; 5) Head-to-head away goals scored; 6) Away goals scored; 7) Play-off.

==== Results summary ====
Overall								Home						Away					
Pld	W	D	L	GF	GA	GD	Pts	W	D	L	GF	GA	GD	W	D	L	GF	GA	GD
34	13	7	14	50	45	+5	46	10	5	2	33	11	+22	3	2	12	17	34	−17

Source: DFB

==== Results by round ====
Round	1	2	3	4	5	6	7	8	9	10	11	12	13	14	15	16	17	18	19	20	21	22	23	24	25	26	27	28	29	30	31	32	33	34
Ground	H	A	H	A	H	A	H	A	H	A	H	H	A	H	A	H	A	A	H	A	H	A	H	A	H	A	H	A	A	H	A	H	A	H
Result	W	L	W	W	D	L	L	L	W	W	D	D	L	W	L	W	L	L	W	L	W	D	W	L	L	L	W	D	L	D	L	W	W	D
Position	5	11	7	4	5	6	9	11	7	5	7	8	9	7	8	6	9	10	10	10	10	9	8	9	10	10	10	10	10	9	10	9	9	8

Source: DFB
A = Away; H = Home; W = Win; D = Draw; L = Loss

==== Matches ====
The league fixtures were announced on 25 June 2021.

15 August 2021 1	Mainz 05	1–0	RB Leipzig	Mainz
15:30 CEST (UTC+2)	Niakhaté 13'; Nebel (yellow card) 48'	Report	Kampl (yellow card) 7'; Sabitzer (yellow card) 80'	Stadium: Opel Arena; Attendance: 10,500; Referee: Daniel Siebert

21 August 2021 2	VfL Bochum	2–0	Mainz 05	Bochum
15:30 CEST (UTC+2)	Holtmann 21'; Rexhbeçaj (yellow card) 54'; Polter 56'; Riemann (yellow card) 87'; Asano (yellow card) 90+3'; Zoller (yellow card) 90+4'	Report	Boëtius (yellow card) 56'; Barreiro (yellow card) 67'; Kohr (yellow card) 89'	Stadium: Vonovia Ruhrstadion; Attendance: 12,548; Referee: Patrick Ittrich

28 August 2021 3	Mainz 05	3–0	Greuther Fürth	Mainz
15:30 CEST (UTC+2)	Lucoqui 15'; Szalai 18'; Bell (yellow card) 25'; Kohr (yellow card) 28'; Stöger 90+2'	Report	Hoogma (yellow card) 22'; Seguin (yellow card) 45'	Stadium: Opel Arena; Attendance: 11,500; Referee: Tobias Reichel

11 September 2021 4	1899 Hoffenheim	0–2	Mainz 05	Sinsheim
15:30 CEST (UTC+2)	Gaćinović (yellow card) 39'; Vogt (yellow card) 70'	Report	Burkardt 21'; Ingvartsen 77'; Hack (yellow card) 86'	Stadium: Rhein-Neckar-Arena; Attendance: 8,427; Referee: Marco Fritz

18 September 2021 5	Mainz 05	0–0	SC Freiburg	Mainz
15:30 CEST (UTC+2)	Hack (yellow card) 45'; Zentner (yellow card) 90+3'	Report	Schlotterbeck (yellow card) 64'	Stadium: Opel Arena; Attendance: 13,500; Referee: Benjamin Brand

25 September 2021 6	Bayer Leverkusen	1–0	Mainz 05	Leverkusen
15:30 CEST (UTC+2)	Tah (yellow card) 11'; Diaby (yellow card) 44'; Wirtz 62'; Bakker (yellow card) 83'; Alario (yellow card) 90+3'	Report	Lucoqui (yellow card) 44'; Stach (yellow card) 69'; Lee (yellow card) 86'	Stadium: BayArena; Attendance: 16,624; Referee: Bastian Dankert

3 October 2021 7	Mainz 05	1–2	Union Berlin	Mainz
15:30 CEST (UTC+2)	Ingvartsen 39'; Kohr (yellow card) 75' (yellow-red card) 90+2'	Report	Haraguchi (yellow card) 45+2'; Knoche (yellow card) 66'; Awoniyi 69', 73'; Prömel (yellow card) 79'; Kruse (yellow card) 82'	Stadium: Opel Arena; Attendance: 16,000; Referee: Tobias Stieler

16 October 2021 8	Borussia Dortmund	3–1	Mainz 05	Dortmund
15:30 CEST (UTC+2)	Reus 3'; Schulz (yellow card) 13'; Akanji (yellow card) 35'; Haaland 54' (pen.), 90+4'	Report	Bell (yellow card) 50'; Ingvartsen (yellow card) 64'; Tauer (yellow card) 71'; Burkardt 87'; Niakhaté (yellow card) 89'	Stadium: Signal Iduna Park; Attendance: 63,812; Referee: Daniel Schlager

22 October 2021 9	Mainz 05	4–1	FC Augsburg	Mainz
20:30 CEST (UTC+2)	Onisiwo 10'; Bell 15'; Burkardt 26', 71'; Martín (yellow card) 70'	Report	Oxford (yellow card) 8'; Gouweleeuw (yellow card) 63'; Vargas (yellow card) 66'; Zeqiri 69'	Stadium: Opel Arena; Attendance: 19,400; Referee: Robert Hartmann

30 October 2021 10	Arminia Bielefeld	1–2	Mainz 05	Bielefeld
15:30 CEST (UTC+2)	Laursen 42'; Andrade (yellow card) 52'; Prietl (yellow card) 70'	Report	Lee 25'; Kohr (yellow card) 58'; Burkardt 69'; Hack (yellow card) 77'; Bell (yellow card) 80'	Stadium: Bielefelder Alm; Attendance: 19,477; Referee: Bastian Dankert

5 November 2021 11	Mainz 05	1–1	Borussia Mönchengladbach	Mainz
20:30 CET (UTC+1)	Lee (yellow card) 31'; Bell (yellow card) 45'; Boëtius (yellow card) 53'; Widmer 76'	Report	Elvedi (yellow card) 22'; Neuhaus 38'; Koné (yellow card) 64'; Bensebaini (yellow card) 70'	Stadium: Opel Arena; Attendance: 25,000; Referee: Robert Schröder

21 November 2021 12	Mainz 05	1–1	1. FC Köln	Mainz
17:30 CET (UTC+1)	Burkardt 41'; Bell (yellow card) 42'; Szalai (yellow card) 90+1'	Report	Özcan 47'; Duda (yellow card) 54'	Stadium: Opel Arena; Attendance: 25,500; Referee: Deniz Aytekin

26 November 2021 13	VfB Stuttgart	2–1	Mainz 05	Stuttgart
20:30 CET (UTC+1)	Ito 21'; Mangala (yellow card) 36'; Sosa 51', (yellow card) 90+2'	Report	Martín (yellow card) 9'; Hack 39'; Boëtius (yellow card) 90+5'	Stadium: Mercedes-Benz Arena; Attendance: 25,000; Referee: Matthias Jöllenbeck

4 December 2021 14	Mainz 05	3–0	VfL Wolfsburg	Mainz
15:30 CET (UTC+1)	Burkardt 2'; Stach 4'; Barreiro (yellow card) 78'; Lacroix 90' (o.g.)	Report	Mbabu (yellow card) 82'	Stadium: Opel Arena; Attendance: 10,000; Referee: Florian Badstübner

11 December 2021 15	Bayern Munich	2–1	Mainz 05	Munich
15:30 CET (UTC+1)	Musiala (yellow card) 27', (goal) 74'; Sané (yellow card) 36'; Coman 53'; Hernandez (yellow card) 56'	Report	Onisiwo 22'; Stach (yellow card) 59'; Hack (yellow card) 89'; Stöger (yellow card) 90+1'	Stadium: Allianz Arena; Attendance: 0 Referee: Benjamin Cortus

14 December 2021 16	Mainz 05	4–0	Hertha BSC	Mainz
20:30 CET (UTC+1)	Lee 19'; Hack 41'; Widmer 49'; Boëtius 79'	Report	Serdar (yellow card) 36'; Stark (yellow card) 59'	Stadium: Opel Arena; Attendance: 10,000; Referee: Harm Osmers

18 December 2021 17	Eintracht Frankfurt	1–0	Mainz 05	Frankfurt
15:30 CET (UTC+1)	Lindstrøm 34'	Report	Martín (yellow card) 90+3'	Stadium: Deutsche Bank Park; Attendance: 15,000; Referee: Felix Brych

8 January 2022 18	RB Leipzig	4–1	Mainz 05	Leipzig
15:30 CET (UTC+1)	Silva 21', 61'; Szoboszlai 47'; Nkunku 58'	Report	Lee (yellow card) 16', (goal) 57'; Hack (red card) 20'; Bell (yellow card) 59'	Stadium: Red Bull Arena; Referee: Deniz Aytekin

15 January 2022 19	Mainz 05	1–0	VfL Bochum	Mainz
15:30 CET (UTC+1)	St. Juste 48'; Stach (yellow card) 55'; Stöger (yellow card) 85'; Nebel (yellow card) 86'	Report	Polter (penalty missed) 32'; Bella-Kotchap (yellow card) 70'; Gamboa (yellow card) 76'; Rexhbeçaj (yellow card) 89'	Stadium: Opel Arena; Attendance: 1,000; Referee: Frank Willenborg

22 January 2022 20	Greuther Fürth	2–1	Mainz 05	Fürth
15:30 CET (UTC+1)	Dudziak 12'; Bell 66' (o.g.); Seguin (yellow card) 86'	Report	Nebel (yellow card) 88'; Onisiwo 90+3'	Stadium: Sportpark Ronhof; Attendance: 0 Referee: Robert Schröder

5 February 2022 21	Mainz 05	2–0	1899 Hoffenheim	Mainz
15:30 CET (UTC+1)	Lee 79'; Niakhaté 83' (pen.)	Report	Hübner (yellow card) 17'; Rutter (yellow card) 74'	Stadium: Opel Arena; Attendance: 6,800; Referee: Christian Dingert

12 February 2022 22	SC Freiburg	1–1	Mainz 05	Freiburg
15:30 CET (UTC+1)	Petersen 69'	Report	Stach (yellow card) 7'; Hack 31'; Kohr (yellow card) 76'	Stadium: Europa-Park Stadion; Attendance: 10,000; Referee: Deniz Aytekin

18 February 2022 23	Mainz 05	3–2	Bayer Leverkusen	Mainz
20:30 CET (UTC+1)	Martín 57', (yellow card) 66'; Boëtius 84'; Ingvartsen 88', (yellow card) 90+5'	Report	Adli (yellow card) 31'; Schick 35'; Demirbay (yellow card) 56'; Alario 74'	Stadium: Opel Arena; Attendance: 10,000; Referee: Benjamin Cortus

26 February 2022 24	Union Berlin	3–1	Mainz 05	Berlin
15:30 CET (UTC+1)	Haraguchi 8'; Trimmel (yellow card) 42'; Becker 56'; Jaeckel (yellow card) 67'; Awoniyi 75'; Baumgartl (yellow card) 90+2'; Khedira (yellow card) 90+2'	Report	Hack (yellow card) 18'; Kohr (yellow card) 58' (yellow-red card) 60'; Burgzorg 90'; Stöger (yellow card) 90+2'	Stadium: Stadion An der Alten Försterei; Attendance: 10,000; Referee: Bastian Dankert

16 March 2022 25	Mainz 05	0–1	Borussia Dortmund	Mainz
18:30 CET (UTC+1)	Bell (yellow card) 43'; Stach (yellow card) 49'; Lucoqui (yellow card) 90+2'	Report	Wolf (yellow card) 43'; Dahoud (yellow card) 44'; Pongračić (yellow card) 45+3'; Witsel 87', (yellow card) 90+3'	Stadium: Opel Arena; Attendance: 25,000; Referee: Sascha Stegemann
Note: The match was originally scheduled for 6 March 2022, but was postponed due to a COVID-19 outbreak in Mainz 05's squad.

19 March 2022 27	Mainz 05	4–0	Arminia Bielefeld	Mainz
15:30 CET (UTC+1)	Burkardt 1', 75' (pen.); Kohr (yellow card) 10'; Niakhaté 65' (pen.); Ingvartsen 79' (pen.)	Report		Stadium: Opel Arena; Attendance: 25,000; Referee: Felix Zwayer

3 April 2022 28	Borussia Mönchengladbach	1–1	Mainz 05	Mönchengladbach
17:30 CEST (UTC+2)	Embolo (yellow card) 10', (goal) 33'; Ginter (yellow card) 28'	Report	Barreiro (yellow card) 40'; Onisiwo 73'	Stadium: Borussia-Park; Attendance: 44,156; Referee: Daniel Schlager

6 April 2022 26	FC Augsburg	2–1	Mainz 05	Augsburg
18:30 CEST (UTC+2)	Gouweleeuw 11' (pen.), (yellow card) 76'; Vargas 56'; Gruezo (yellow card) 75'; Gumny (yellow card) 80'	Report	Bell (yellow card) 15'; Widmer 54', (yellow card) 83'	Stadium: WWK Arena; Attendance: 18,122; Referee: Matthias Jöllenbeck
Note: The match was originally scheduled for 12 March 2022, but was postponed due to a COVID-19 outbreak in Mainz 05's squad.

9 April 2022 29	1. FC Köln	3–2	Mainz 05	Cologne
15:30 CEST (UTC+2)	Chabot (yellow card) 34'; Skhiri 60'; Ljubičić 78'; Modeste (yellow card) 79'; Kilian 82'	Report	Burkardt 14'; Martín (yellow card) 36'; Onisiwo 55'; Stach (yellow card) 65'	Stadium: RheinEnergieStadion; Attendance: 49,800; Referee: Martin Petersen

16 April 2022 30	Mainz 05	0–0	VfB Stuttgart	Mainz
15:30 CEST (UTC+2)		Report	Stenzel (yellow card) 70'	Stadium: Opel Arena; Attendance: 30,128; Referee: Florian Badstübner

22 April 2022 31	VfL Wolfsburg	5–0	Mainz 05	Wolfsburg
20:30 CEST (UTC+2)	Wind 8', 42'; Kruse 24' (pen.), 35', 45+2'	Report	Tauer (red card) 23'; Kohr (yellow card) 81'; Hack (yellow card) 82'	Stadium: Volkswagen Arena; Attendance: 19,055; Referee: Harm Osmers

30 April 2022 32	Mainz 05	3–1	Bayern Munich	Mainz
15:30 CEST (UTC+2)	Burkardt 18'; Niakhaté 27'; Barreiro 57'	Report	Lewandowski 33'; Kimmich (yellow card) 43'; Hernandez (yellow card) 65'; Pavard (yellow card) 73'; Sané (yellow card) 86'	Stadium: Opel Arena; Attendance: 33,305; Referee: Sascha Stegemann

7 May 2022 33	Hertha BSC	1–2	Mainz 05	Berlin
18:30 CEST (UTC+2)	Selke 45+5' (pen.); Dárdai (yellow card) 56'; Darida (yellow card) 80'; Ascacíbar (yellow card) 88'	Report	Widmer 25'; Martín (yellow card) 65'; Bell 81'	Stadium: Olympiastadion; Attendance: 71,548; Referee: Patrick Ittrich

14 May 2022 34	Mainz 05	2–2	Eintracht Frankfurt	Mainz
15:30 CEST (UTC+2)	Ingvartsen 10', 49'; Martín (yellow card) 50'; Bell (yellow card) 56'	Report	Tuta 26'; Borré 35'	Stadium: Opel Arena; Attendance: 33,000; Referee: Martin Petersen

=== DFB-Pokal ===
8 August 2021 First round	SV Elversberg	2–2 (a.e.t.) (7–8 p)	Mainz 05	Spiesen-Elversberg
15:30 CEST (UTC+2)	Conrad (yellow card) 46'; Schnellbacher 73', 110'; Fellhauer (yellow card) 86'	Report	Niakhaté (yellow card) 69'; Burkardt 89', 116'; Kohr (yellow card) 118'	Stadium: Waldstadion an der Kaiserlinde; Attendance: 2,600; Referee: Thorben Siewer
	Penalties
	Schnellbacher (penalty scored); Fellhauer (penalty scored); Baumgärtel (penalty scored); Dragon (penalty scored); Conrad (penalty scored); Laprévotte (penalty scored); Müller (penalty scored); Von Piechowski (penalty missed)		(penalty scored) Niakhaté; (penalty scored) Stöger; (penalty scored) Boëtius; (penalty scored) Burkardt; (penalty scored) Brosinski; (penalty scored) Martín; (penalty scored) St. Juste; (penalty scored) Stach

26 October 2021 Second round	Mainz 05	3–2 (a.e.t.)	Arminia Bielefeld	Mainz
20:45 CEST (UTC+2)	Burkardt 53'; Onisiwo 59'; Ingvartsen 114'	Report	Okugawa 2'; Prietl (yellow card) 20'; Schöpf (yellow card) 38'; Pieper (yellow card) 48'; Klos 89'	Stadium: Mewa Arena; Attendance: 10,000; Referee: Sascha Stegemann

18 January 2022 Round of 16	VfL Bochum	3–1	Mainz 05	Bochum
20:45 CET (UTC+1)	Pantović 56' (pen.), 59'; Löwen 80'	Report	Lee (yellow card) 14'; Onisiwo 36'; Barreiro (yellow card) 55'; Bell (yellow card) 65'; Stach (yellow card) 75'	Stadium: Vonovia Ruhrstadion; Referee: Felix Brych
