= 2020–21 1. FSV Mainz 05 season =

Mainz 05
2020–21 season
- President: Stefan Hofmann
- Head coach: Achim Beierlorzer (until 28 September); Jan-Moritz Lichte (interim, from 28 September to 28 December); Jan Siewert (interim, from 28 December to 4 January); Bo Svensson (from 4 January)
- Stadium: Opel Arena
- Bundesliga: 12th
- DFB-Pokal: Second round
- Top goalscorer: League: Jean-Philippe Mateta (7); All: Jean-Philippe Mateta (10)
Home colours	Away colours	Third colours

The 2020–21 1. FSV Mainz 05 season was the club's 116th season in existence and the club's 12th consecutive season in the top flight of German football. In addition to the domestic league, 1. FSV Mainz 05 participated in this season's edition of the DFB-Pokal. The season covered the period from 1 July 2020 to 30 June 2021.

== Players ==
=== First-team squad ===
As of 1 February 2021

Note: Flags indicate national team as defined under FIFA eligibility rules; some limited exceptions apply. Players may hold more than one non-FIFA nationality.

No.	Pos.	Nation	Player
4	DF	NED	Jerry St. Juste
5	MF	NED	Jean-Paul Boëtius
6	MF	GER	Danny Latza (captain)
7	FW	SWE	Robin Quaison
8	MF	GER	Levin Öztunalı
9	FW	GER	Robert Glatzel (on loan from Cardiff City)
14	MF	CMR	Pierre Kunde
15	DF	GER	Luca Kilian
16	DF	GER	Stefan Bell
17	MF	AUT	Kevin Stöger
18	DF	GER	Daniel Brosinski
19	DF	FRA	Moussa Niakhaté (vice-captain)
20	MF	SUI	Edimilson Fernandes
21	FW	AUT	Karim Onisiwo
22	DF	GER	Danny da Costa (on loan from Eintracht Frankfurt)

No.	Pos.	Nation	Player
23	DF	AUT	Phillipp Mwene
24	MF	GER	Merveille Papela
25	MF	GER	Niklas Tauer
26	MF	GER	Paul Nebel
27	GK	GER	Robin Zentner
28	FW	HUN	Ádám Szalai
29	FW	GER	Jonathan Burkardt
31	MF	GER	Dominik Kohr (on loan from Eintracht Frankfurt)
33	GK	ISR	Omer Hanin
35	MF	LUX	Leandro Barreiro
36	FW	AUT	Marlon Mustapha
37	GK	GER	Finn Dahmen
41	GK	GER	Marius Liesegang
42	DF	GER	Alexander Hack

=== Out on loan ===
Note: Flags indicate national team as defined under FIFA eligibility rules; some limited exceptions apply. Players may hold more than one non-FIFA nationality.

No.	Pos.	Nation	Player
—	GK	GER	Florian Müller (at SC Freiburg until 30 June 2021)
—	DF	GER	Ahmet Gürleyen (at SV Wehen Wiesbaden until 30 June 2021)
—	DF	BEL	Dimitri Lavalée (at Sint-Truiden until 30 June 2021)
—	DF	ESP	Aarón Martín (at Celta Vigo until 30 June 2021)
—	DF	GER	Jonathan Meier (at Dynamo Dresden until 30 June 2021)

No.	Pos.	Nation	Player
—	DF	FRA	Ronaël Pierre-Gabriel (at Stade Brestois 29 until 30 June 2021)
—	FW	GHA	Abass Issah (at FC Twente until 30 June 2021)
—	FW	FRA	Jean-Philippe Mateta (at Crystal Palace until 30 June 2022)
—	FW	KOR	Ji Dong-won (at Eintracht Braunschweig until 30 June 2021)

== Pre-season and friendlies ==
Win Draw Loss

15 August 2020 Friendly	Mainz 05	6–0	Würzburger Kickers	Mainz, Germany
14:30 CEST (UTC+2)	Szalai 20', 50'; Quaison 22'; Burkardt 35'; Mustapha 94'; Barreiro 111'	Report		Stadium: Stadion am Bruchweg; Attendance: 250; Referee: Nicolas Winter
Note: Match was played in four 30-minute quarters.

19 August 2020 Friendly	Mainz 05	Cancelled	VfB Stuttgart	Mainz, Germany
16:00 CEST (UTC+2)		Report		Stadium: Stadion am Bruchweg

22 August 2020 Friendly	Mainz 05	0–1	SV Sandhausen	Mainz, Germany
14:00 CEST (UTC+2)			Keita-Ruel 40' (pen.)	Stadium: Stadion am Bruchweg
Note: Match was played in two 60-minute halves.

29 August 2020 Friendly	1899 Hoffenheim	2–1	Mainz 05	Zuzenhausen, Germany
13:00 CEST (UTC+1)	Posch 55'; Skov 63'	Report	Mateta 51'	Stadium: Akademie-Arena Rasen 1

29 August 2020 Friendly	1899 Hoffenheim	2–1	Mainz 05	Zuzenhausen, Germany
15:30 CEST (UTC+1)	Klauss 10'; Bebou 86'	Report	Öztunalı 22'	Stadium: Akademie-Arena Rasen 1

5 September 2020 Friendly	Eintracht Frankfurt	Cancelled	Mainz 05	Frankfurt, Germany
15:30 CEST (UTC+2)				Stadium: Waldstadion
Note: The match was cancelled due to two positive COVID-19 cases in the Mainz 05 squad.

8 October 2020 Friendly	Mainz 05	2–4	Karlsruher SC	Mainz, Germany
14:00 CEST (UTC+2)	Hack 59'; Mateta 60'	Report	Goller 27'; Batmaz 55'; Djuricin 66'; Guèye 82'	Stadium: Stadion am Bruchweg; Referee: Robert Kampka

25 March 2021 Friendly	Mainz 05	2–2	1. FC Nürnberg	Mainz, Germany
14:00 CET (UTC+1)	Hack 10'; Mustapha 54'	Report	Dovedan 33'; Schleusener 59'	Stadium: Stadion am Bruchweg

== Competitions ==
=== Overview ===
Competition	First match	Last match	Starting round	Final position	Record							
Competition	First match	Last match	Starting round	Final position	Pld	W	D	L	GF	GA	GD	Win %
Bundesliga	20 September 2020	22 May 2021	Matchday 1	12th	34	10	9	15	39	56	−17	29.41
DFB-Pokal	11 September 2020	23 December 2020	First round	Second round	2	1	1	0	7	3	+4	50.00
Total					36	11	10	15	46	59	−13	30.56

Source: Soccerway

=== Bundesliga ===
==== League table ====
Pos	Team	Pld	W	D	L	GF	GA	GD	Pts
10	SC Freiburg	34	12	9	13	52	52	0	45
11	1899 Hoffenheim	34	11	10	13	52	54	−2	43
12	Mainz 05	34	10	9	15	39	56	−17	39
13	FC Augsburg	34	10	6	18	36	54	−18	36
14	Hertha BSC	34	8	11	15	41	52	−11	35

Source: DFB
Rules for classification: 1) Points; 2) Goal difference; 3) Goals scored; 4) Head-to-head results; 5) Head-to-head away goals scored; 6) Away goals scored; 7) Play-off.

==== Results summary ====
Overall								Home						Away					
Pld	W	D	L	GF	GA	GD	Pts	W	D	L	GF	GA	GD	W	D	L	GF	GA	GD
34	10	9	15	39	56	−17	39	4	4	9	16	26	−10	6	5	6	23	30	−7

Source: DFB

==== Results by round ====
Round	1	2	3	4	5	6	7	8	9	10	11	12	13	14	15	16	17	18	19	20	21	22	23	24	25	26	27	28	29	30	31	32	33	34
Ground	A	H	A	H	H	A	H	A	H	A	H	A	H	A	H	A	H	H	A	H	A	A	H	A	H	A	H	A	H	A	H	A	H	A
Result	L	L	L	L	L	L	D	W	D	L	L	D	L	L	L	D	L	W	L	W	D	W	L	D	W	W	D	W	D	W	W	D	L	W
Position	14	17	17	18	18	18	18	15	16	17	17	17	17	17	18	17	17	17	17	17	17	17	17	17	17	15	15	14	14	13	12	12	13	12

Source: DFB
A = Away; H = Home; W = Win; D = Draw; L = Loss

==== Matches ====
The league fixtures were announced on 7 August 2020.

20 September 2020 1	RB Leipzig	3–1	Mainz 05	Leipzig
15:30 CEST (UTC+2)	Forsberg 17' (pen.); Poulsen 21', (yellow card) 64'; Haidara 51'	Report	Mateta (yellow card) 30', (goal) 48'; Latza (yellow card) 58'	Stadium: Red Bull Arena; Attendance: 8,500; Referee: Manuel Gräfe

26 September 2020 2	Mainz 05	1–4	VfB Stuttgart	Mainz
15:30 CEST (UTC+2)	Quaison 13'; Niakhaté (yellow card) 37' (yellow-red card) 77'	Report	Silas 45'; Stenzel (yellow card) 52' (yellow-red card) 90+1'; Didavi 61'; Mangala (yellow card) 69'; Castro (yellow card) 74'; Klimowicz 80'; Kalajdžić 86'	Stadium: Opel Arena; Attendance: 3,403; Referee: Daniel Schlager

2 October 2020 3	Union Berlin	4–0	Mainz 05	Berlin
20:30 CEST (UTC+2)	Kruse 13'; Trimmel (yellow card) 33'; Ingvartsen 49'; Friedrich 63'; Pohjanpalo 64'	Report	Mateta (yellow card) 54'; Latza (yellow card) 59'; Boëtius (yellow card) 67'; St. Juste (yellow card) 78'	Stadium: Stadion An der Alten Försterei; Attendance: 4,400; Referee: Sascha Stegemann

17 October 2020 4	Mainz 05	0–1	Bayer Leverkusen	Mainz
15:30 CEST (UTC+2)	Latza (yellow card) 75'; Fernandes (yellow card) 85'; Ji Dong-won (yellow card) 86'	Report	Alario 30'; L. Bender (yellow card) 57'	Stadium: Opel Arena; Attendance: 250; Referee: Bastian Dankert

24 October 2020 5	Mainz 05	2–3	Borussia Mönchengladbach	Mainz
15:30 CEST (UTC+2)	Mateta 23', 36'; Kunde (yellow card) 49'; Kilian (yellow card) 61'; Niakhaté (yellow card) 75'; Latza (yellow card) 77'; Zentner (yellow card) 83'	Report	Stindl 15'; Embolo (yellow card) 53'; Neuhaus (yellow card) 62'; Hofmann 75' (pen.); Ginter 83'; Thuram (yellow card) 84'	Stadium: Opel Arena; Attendance: 100; Referee: Frank Willenborg

31 October 2020 6	FC Augsburg	3–1	Mainz 05	Augsburg
15:30 CET (UTC+1)	Vargas 40', (yellow card) 49'; Strobl (yellow card) 58'; Iago (yellow card) 66'; Hahn 80', 90+1', (yellow card) 90+2'; Sarenren Bazee (yellow card) 85'	Report	Onisiwo 64'; St. Juste (yellow card) 84'	Stadium: WWK Arena; Attendance: 0 Referee: Marco Fritz

7 November 2020 7	Mainz 05	2–2	Schalke 04	Mainz
15:30 CET (UTC+1)	Brosinski 6' (pen.); Mateta 45+2' (pen.); Latza (yellow card) 64'	Report	Uth 36'; Kabak (yellow card) 44'; St. Juste 82' (o.g.)	Stadium: Opel Arena; Attendance: 0 Referee: Patrick Ittrich

22 November 2020 8	SC Freiburg	1–3	Mainz 05	Freiburg
15:30 CET (UTC+1)	Petersen 63'	Report	Mateta 2', 34', 40'; Niakhaté (yellow card) 67'	Stadium: Schwarzwald-Stadion; Attendance: 0 Referee: Martin Petersen

29 November 2020 9	Mainz 05	1–1	1899 Hoffenheim	Mainz
18:00 CET (UTC+1)	Quaison 33'	Report	Bebou 62'; Geiger (red card) 80'	Stadium: Opel Arena; Attendance: 0 Referee: Sascha Stegemann

5 December 2020 10	Arminia Bielefeld	2–1	Mainz 05	Bielefeld
15:30 CET (UTC+1)	Prietl 21'; Dōan 31'; Schipplock (yellow card) 74'; Hartel (yellow card) 85'; Kunze (yellow card) 90+4'	Report	Niakhaté (yellow card) 49'; St. Juste (yellow card) 66'; Stöger 82'	Stadium: Bielefelder Alm; Attendance: 0 Referee: Marco Fritz

12 December 2020 11	Mainz 05	0–1	1. FC Köln	Mainz
15:30 CET (UTC+1)	Niakhaté (yellow card) 37'; Latza (yellow card) 45+1'; Onisiwo (yellow card) 67'; Stöger (yellow card) 75'	Report	Rexhbeçaj 55'; Özcan (yellow card) 70'; Duda (yellow card) 75' (yellow-red card) 76'; Horn (yellow card) 81'	Stadium: Opel Arena; Attendance: 0 Referee: Felix Zwayer

15 December 2020 12	Hertha BSC	0–0	Mainz 05	Berlin
20:30 CET (UTC+1)	Piątek (yellow card) 33'; Cunha (yellow card) 49'; Torunarigha (yellow card) 66'	Report	Stöger (yellow card) 28'	Stadium: Olympiastadion; Attendance: 0 Referee: Matthias Jöllenbeck

19 December 2020 13	Mainz 05	0–1	Werder Bremen	Mainz
15:30 CET (UTC+1)	Barreiro (yellow card) 73'; Niakhaté (yellow card) 82'	Report	Eggestein (yellow card) 50'; Dinkçi 90'; Groß (yellow card) 90+5'	Stadium: Opel Arena; Attendance: 0 Referee: Guido Winkmann

3 January 2021 14	Bayern Munich	5–2	Mainz 05	Munich
18:00 CET (UTC+1)	Boateng (yellow card) 32'; Kimmich 50'; Sané 55'; Alaba (yellow card) 62'; Süle 70'; Lewandowski 76' (pen.), 83'	Report	Burkardt 32'; Hack 44'; Boëtius (yellow card) 59'	Stadium: Allianz Arena; Attendance: 0 Referee: Markus Schmidt

9 January 2021 15	Mainz 05	0–2	Eintracht Frankfurt	Mainz
15:30 CET (UTC+1)	Niakhaté (yellow card) 22'; Quaison (yellow card) 43'	Report	Silva 24' (pen.), 72' (pen.); Hasebe (yellow card) 59'	Stadium: Opel Arena; Attendance: 0 Referee: Bastian Dankert

16 January 2021 16	Borussia Dortmund	1–1	Mainz 05	Dortmund
15:30 CET (UTC+1)	Can (yellow card) 68'; Meunier 73'; Reus (penalty missed) 76'	Report	Mwene (yellow card) 40'; Hack (yellow card) 47'; Öztunalı 57'	Stadium: Signal Iduna Park; Attendance: 0 Referee: Sven Jablonski

19 January 2021 17	Mainz 05	0–2	VfL Wolfsburg	Mainz
20:30 CET (UTC+1)	Boëtius (yellow card) 57'	Report	Philipp (yellow card) 53'; Białek 65'; Weghorst 79'; Guilavogui (yellow card) 90+2'	Stadium: Opel Arena; Attendance: 0 Referee: Sören Storks

23 January 2021 18	Mainz 05	3–2	RB Leipzig	Mainz
15:30 CET (UTC+1)	Niakhaté 24', 35', (yellow card) 40'; Barreiro 50'; Da Costa (yellow card) 75'	Report	Adams 15', (yellow card) 70'; Halstenberg (yellow card) 23', (goal) 30'; Orbán (yellow card) 88'; Sørloth (yellow card) 90+2'	Stadium: Opel Arena; Attendance: 0 Referee: Christian Dingert

29 January 2021 19	VfB Stuttgart	2–0	Mainz 05	Stuttgart
20:30 CET (UTC+1)	Förster (yellow card) 33'; Kalajdžić 55'; Silas 72'	Report	Niakhaté (yellow card) 21'; Bell (yellow card) 43'; Onisiwo (yellow card) 45+1'; Kohr (yellow card) 81'	Stadium: Mercedes-Benz Arena; Attendance: 0 Referee: Frank Willenborg

6 February 2021 20	Mainz 05	1–0	Union Berlin	Mainz
15:30 CET (UTC+1)	Niakhaté 22' (pen.); Kohr (yellow card) 28'; Barreiro (yellow card) 40'	Report	Schlotterbeck (yellow card) 21' (yellow-red card) 55'; Teuchert (yellow card) 33'; Knoche (yellow card) 60'; Trimmel (yellow card) 67'	Stadium: Opel Arena; Attendance: 0 Referee: Sascha Stegemann

13 February 2021 21	Bayer Leverkusen	2–2	Mainz 05	Leverkusen
15:30 CET (UTC+1)	Tah (yellow card) 3'; Wendell (yellow card) 13'; Alario 14'; Tapsoba (yellow card) 67'; Schick (yellow card) 68', (goal) 84'; Fosu-Mensah (yellow card) 82'	Report	Glatzel 89'; Stöger 90+2', (yellow card) 90+4'	Stadium: BayArena; Attendance: 0 Referee: Guido Winkmann

20 February 2021 22	Borussia Mönchengladbach	1–2	Mainz 05	Mönchengladbach
15:30 CET (UTC+1)	Kramer (yellow card) 14'; Stindl 26'	Report	Onisiwo 10'; Kohr (yellow card) 61'; Stöger 86'	Stadium: Borussia-Park; Attendance: 0 Referee: Markus Schmidt

28 February 2021 23	Mainz 05	0–1	FC Augsburg	Mainz
15:30 CET (UTC+1)	Latza (yellow card) 44'	Report	Hahn 25'; Framberger (yellow card) 45'; Strobl (yellow card) 76'	Stadium: Opel Arena; Attendance: 0 Referee: Daniel Schlager

5 March 2021 24	Schalke 04	0–0	Mainz 05	Gelsenkirchen
20:30 CET (UTC+1)	Kolašinac (yellow card) 9'; Mascarell (yellow card) 85'	Report	Bell (yellow card) 47'; Szalai (yellow card) 51'	Stadium: Veltins-Arena; Attendance: 0 Referee: Felix Brych

13 March 2021 25	Mainz 05	1–0	SC Freiburg	Mainz
15:30 CET (UTC+1)	Bell (yellow card) 68'; Quaison 84'	Report	Höfler (yellow card) 21'; Schlotterbeck (yellow card) 33'; Schmid (yellow card) 90+4'	Stadium: Opel Arena; Attendance: 0 Referee: Benjamin Cortus

21 March 2021 26	1899 Hoffenheim	1–2	Mainz 05	Sinsheim
13:30 CET (UTC+1)	Bebou 39'	Report	Glatzel 1'; Kohr 41'	Stadium: Rhein-Neckar-Arena; Attendance: 0 Referee: Marco Fritz

3 April 2021 27	Mainz 05	1–1	Arminia Bielefeld	Mainz
15:30 CEST (UTC+2)	Bell (yellow card) 13'; Brosinski 56' (pen.); Latza (yellow card) 73'; Barreiro (yellow card) 80'; Hack (yellow card) 90+4'	Report	Lucoqui (yellow card) 14'; Voglsammer 76'	Stadium: Opel Arena; Attendance: 0 Referee: Deniz Aytekin

11 April 2021 28	1. FC Köln	2–3	Mainz 05	Cologne
18:00 CEST (UTC+2)	Duda (yellow card) 22', (goal) 43' (pen.); Katterbach (yellow card) 34'; Skhiri 61'	Report	Boëtius 11'; Mwene (yellow card) 42'; Onisiwo 65'; Barreiro 90+1'	Stadium: RheinEnergieStadion; Attendance: 0 Referee: Felix Brych

21 April 2021 30	Werder Bremen	0–1	Mainz 05	Bremen
20:30 CEST (UTC+2)	Sargent (yellow card) 63'	Report	Szalai 16'; Boëtius (yellow card) 66'; Zentner (yellow card) 83'	Stadium: Weser-Stadion; Attendance: 0 Referee: Marco Fritz

24 April 2021 31	Mainz 05	2–1	Bayern Munich	Mainz
15:30 CEST (UTC+2)	Burkardt 3'; Quaison 37'; Mwene (yellow card) 58'; St. Juste (yellow card) 59'; Da Costa (yellow card) 87'	Report	Boateng (yellow card) 36'; Goretzka (yellow card) 41'; Alaba (yellow card) 42'; Lewandowski (yellow card) 73', (goal) 90+4'	Stadium: Opel Arena; Attendance: 0 Referee: Harm Osmers

3 May 2021 29	Mainz 05	1–1	Hertha BSC	Mainz
18:00 CEST (UTC+2)	Bell (yellow card) 18'; Mwene 40'; Barreiro (yellow card) 72'	Report	Tousart 36', (yellow card) 39'; Cunha (yellow card) 67'; Ascacíbar (yellow card) 73'	Stadium: Opel Arena; Attendance: 0 Referee: Sascha Stegemann
Note: The match was originally scheduled for 18 April 2021, but was postponed after more than ten Hertha players and staff tested positive for COVID-19.

9 May 2021 32	Eintracht Frankfurt	1–1	Mainz 05	Frankfurt
15:30 CEST (UTC+2)	Kostić (yellow card) 30'; Hrustic (yellow card) 50', (goal) 86'	Report	Onisiwo 11'	Stadium: Deutsche Bank Park; Attendance: 0 Referee: Felix Brych

16 May 2021 33	Mainz 05	1–3	Borussia Dortmund	Mainz
18:00 CEST (UTC+2)	Quaison 90+1' (pen.)	Report	Guerreiro 23'; Reus 42'; Brandt 80'	Stadium: Opel Arena; Attendance: 0 Referee: Harm Osmers

22 May 2021 34	VfL Wolfsburg	2–3	Mainz 05	Wolfsburg
15:30 CEST (UTC+2)	Philipp 47', (yellow card) 75'; Arnold (yellow card) 51'; Schlager (yellow card) 56'; João Victor 66'	Report	Barreiro (yellow card) 29'; Bell (yellow card) 40', (goal) 77'; Boëtius 44', (yellow card) 61'; Quaison 54'	Stadium: Volkswagen Arena; Attendance: 0 Referee: Bastian Dankert

=== DFB-Pokal ===
11 September 2020 First round	TSV Havelse	1–5	Mainz 05	Mainz (Note: Due to the impact of the COVID-19 pandemic in Germany and the organisational effort required to host the fixture, the teams exchanged the home rights to the match.)
20:45 CEST (UTC+2)	Plume (yellow card) 1', (goal) 17'; Fölster (yellow card) 2'; Sonnenberg (yellow card) 71'	Report	Mateta 57', 79', 90'; Szalai 77'; Quaison 86'	Stadium: Opel Arena; Attendance: 1,000; Referee: Arne Aarnink

23 December 2020 Second round	Mainz 05	2–2 (a.e.t.) (0–3 p)	VfL Bochum	Mainz
20:45 CET (UTC+1)	Boëtius 7'; Latza 55'; Mateta (yellow card) 90+4'; Ji Dong-won (yellow card) 100'	Report	Gamboa (yellow card) 2'; Leitsch (yellow card) 32'; Holtmann 66'; Blum (yellow card) 75'; Tesche 90+4'; Riemann (red card) 95'	Stadium: Opel Arena; Attendance: 0 Referee: Martin Petersen
	Penalties
	Szalai (penalty missed); Stöger (penalty missed); Mateta (penalty missed)		(penalty scored) Pantović; (penalty scored) Mašović; (penalty scored) Ganvoula

== Statistics ==
=== Appearances and goals ===
No.	Pos	Nat	Player	Total		Bundesliga		DFB-Pokal	
No.	Pos	Nat	Player	Apps	Goals	Apps	Goals	Apps	Goals
Goalkeepers
27	GK	(Germany) GER	Robin Zentner	33	0	31	0	2	0
33	GK	(Israel) ISR	Omer Hanin	0	0	0	0	0	0
37	GK	(Germany) GER	Finn Dahmen	3	0	3	0	0	0
41	GK	(Germany) GER	Marius Liesegang	0	0	0	0	0	0
Defenders
4	DF	(Netherlands) NED	Jerry St. Juste	34	0	32	0	2	0
15	DF	(Germany) GER	Luca Kilian	7	0	4+2	0	1	0
16	DF	(Germany) GER	Stefan Bell	16	1	16	1	0	0
18	DF	(Germany) GER	Daniel Brosinski	22	2	16+5	2	1	0
19	DF	(France) FRA	Moussa Niakhaté	34	3	32	3	2	0
22	DF	(Germany) GER	Danny da Costa	16	0	15+1	0	0	0
23	DF	(Austria) AUT	Phillipp Mwene	20	1	19+1	1	0	0
42	DF	(Germany) GER	Alexander Hack	22	1	14+7	1	1	0
Midfielders
5	MF	(Netherlands) NED	Jean-Paul Boëtius	33	3	23+8	2	2	1
6	MF	(Germany) GER	Danny Latza	31	1	21+8	0	2	1
8	MF	(Germany) GER	Levin Öztunalı	18	1	7+10	1	1	0
14	MF	(Cameroon) CMR	Pierre Kunde	11	0	6+5	0	0	0
17	MF	(Austria) AUT	Kevin Stöger	20	3	4+15	3	0+1	0
20	MF	(Switzerland) SUI	Edimilson Fernandes	15	0	9+5	0	0+1	0
24	MF	(Germany) GER	Merveille Papela	1	0	0+1	0	0	0
25	MF	(Germany) GER	Niklas Tauer	6	0	0+5	0	0+1	0
26	MF	(Germany) GER	Paul Nebel	5	0	0+4	0	0+1	0
31	MF	(Germany) GER	Dominik Kohr	17	1	14+3	1	0	0
35	MF	(Luxembourg) LUX	Leandro Barreiro	31	2	27+2	2	1+1	0
Forwards
7	FW	(Sweden) SWE	Robin Quaison	30	7	18+10	6	1+1	1
9	FW	(France) FRA	Robert Glatzel	13	2	3+10	2	0	0
21	FW	(Austria) AUT	Karim Onisiwo	32	4	19+12	4	1	0
28	FW	(Hungary) HUN	Ádám Szalai	20	2	8+10	1	0+2	1
29	FW	(Germany) GER	Jonathan Burkardt	31	2	16+13	2	2	0
36	FW	(Austria) AUT	Marlon Mustapha	0	0	0	0	0	0
Players transferred out during the season
3	DF	(Spain) ESP	Aarón Martín	5	0	3+2	0	0	0
9	FW	(France) FRA	Jean-Philippe Mateta	17	10	12+3	7	1+1	3
11	FW	(South Korea) KOR	Ji Dong-won	7	0	0+6	0	0+1	0
13	DF	(Belgium) BEL	Dimitri Lavalée	0	0	0	0	0	0
22	DF	(Ghana) GHA	Abass Issah	3	0	0+2	0	1	0
34	DF	(Germany) GER	Ridle Baku	3	0	2	0	1	0

Last updated: 22 May 2021
Source: Competitions

=== Goalscorers ===
As of 22 May 2021

Rank	No.	Pos	Nat	Name	Bundesliga	DFB-Pokal	Total
1	9	FW	(France)	Jean-Philippe Mateta	7	3	10
2	7	FW	(Sweden)	Robin Quaison	6	1	7
3	21	FW	(Austria)	Karim Onisiwo	4	0	4
Totals					39	7	46
