= 2021 UEFA European Under-21 Championship final =

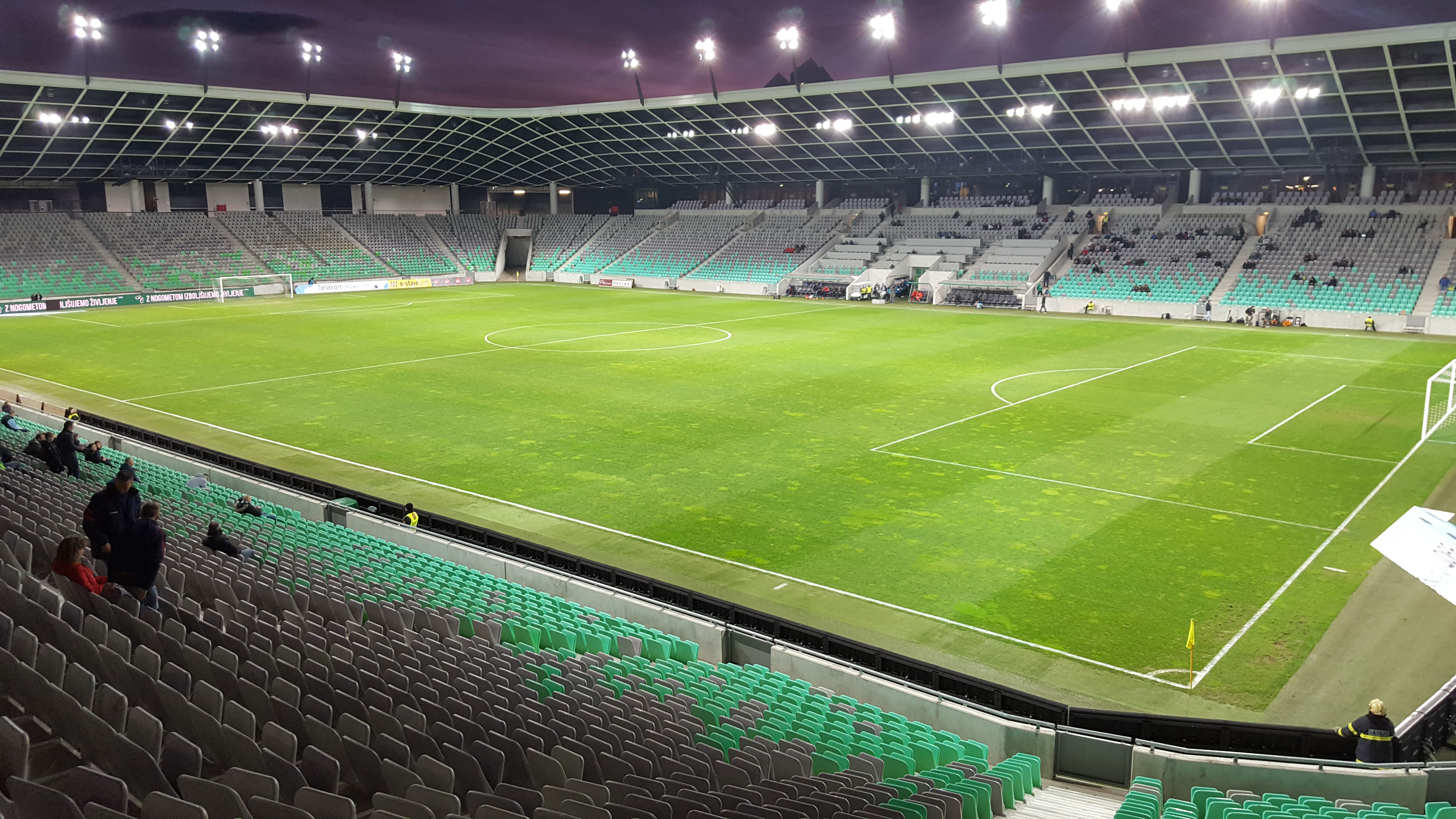
- The Stožice Stadium in Ljubljana hosted the final.
- Event: 2021 UEFA European Under-21 Championship
Germany	Portugal
(Germany)	(Portugal)
1	0
- Date: 6 June 2021
- Venue: Stožice Stadium, Ljubljana
- Man of the Match: Ridle Baku (Germany)
- Referee: Giorgi Kruashvili (Georgia)
- Attendance: 4,883
- Weather: Cloudy night 20 °C (68 °F); 94% humidity

The 2021 UEFA European Under-21 Championship final was a football match that took place on 6 June 2021 at the Stožice Stadium in Ljubljana, Slovenia, to determine the winners of the 2021 UEFA European Under-21 Championship. The match was contested by Germany and Portugal.

Germany won the match 1–0 for their third UEFA European Under-21 Championship title.

== Route to the final ==
Germany
Round
Portugal
Opponents
Result
Group stage
Opponents
Result
Hungary
3–0
Match 1
Croatia
1–0
Netherlands
1–1
Match 2
England
2–0
Romania
0–0
Match 3
Switzerland
3–0
Group A runners-up

Pos	Team	Pld	Pts
1	Netherlands	3	5
2	Germany	3	5
3	Romania	3	5
4	Hungary (H)	3	0

Source: UEFA
(H) Hosts

Final standings
Group D winners

Pos	Team	Pld	Pts
1	Portugal	3	9
2	Croatia	3	3
3	Switzerland	3	3
4	England	3	3

Source: UEFA
Opponents
Result
Knockout stage
Opponents
Result
Denmark
2–2 (a.e.t.) (6–5 p)
Quarter-finals
Italy
5–3 (a.e.t.)
Netherlands
2–1
Semi-finals
Spain
1–0

== Match ==
=== Details ===
6 June 2021
21:00 CEST

Germany	1–0	Portugal
Nmecha 49'	Report

Stožice Stadium, Ljubljana
Attendance: 4,883
Referee: Giorgi Kruashvili (Georgia)

Germany	Portugal

GK	12	Finn Dahmen
RB	21	Ridle Baku
CB	5	Amos Pieper
CB	4	Nico Schlotterbeck
LB	3	David Raum	(yellow card) 90'
CM	8	Arne Maier (c)
CM	6	Niklas Dorsch		(substituted off) 85'
RW	7	Florian Wirtz	(yellow card) 12'	(substituted off) 68'
AM	13	Salih Özcan	(yellow card) 90+2'	(substituted off) 90+2'
LW	11	Mërgim Berisha		(substituted off) 67'
CF	10	Lukas Nmecha	(yellow card) 43'	(substituted off) 85'
Substitutions:
FW	9	Jonathan Burkardt		(substituted on) 67'
FW	18	Karim Adeyemi		(substituted on) 68'
MF	20	Vitaly Janelt		(substituted on) 85'
DF	15	Ismail Jakobs		(substituted on) 85'
MF	17	Anton Stach		(substituted on) 90+2'
Manager:
Stefan Kuntz

GK	1	Diogo Costa
RB	5	Diogo Dalot
CB	4	Diogo Queirós (c)
CB	3	Diogo Leite
LB	2	Abdu Conté		(substituted off) 86'
DM	6	Florentino Luís		(substituted off) 83'
CM	7	Vitinha		(substituted off) 59'
CM	10	Daniel Bragança	(yellow card) 58'
AM	23	Fábio Vieira
CF	11	Dany Mota		(substituted off) 46'
CF	19	Tiago Tomás		(substituted off) 59'
Substitutions:
FW	9	Rafael Leão		(substituted on) 46'
FW	20	Jota	(yellow card) 90+3'	(substituted on) 59'
FW	21	Francisco Conceição		(substituted on) 59'
MF	8	Gedson Fernandes		(substituted on) 83'
MF	18	Gonçalo Ramos		(substituted on) 86'
Manager:
Rui Jorge

Man of the Match:
Ridle Baku (Germany)

Assistant referees:
Levan Varamishvili (Georgia)
Zaza Pipia (Georgia)
Fourth official:
Irakli Kvirikashvili (Georgia)

Match rules

- 90 minutes.
- 30 minutes of extra time if necessary.
- Penalty shoot-out if scores still level.
- Maximum of twelve named substitutes.
- Maximum of five substitutions, with a sixth allowed in extra time. (Note: Each team was given only three opportunities to make substitutions, with a fourth opportunity in extra time, excluding substitutions made at half-time, before the start of extra time and at half-time in extra time.)
