= Alexander Hack =

German footballer (born 1993)

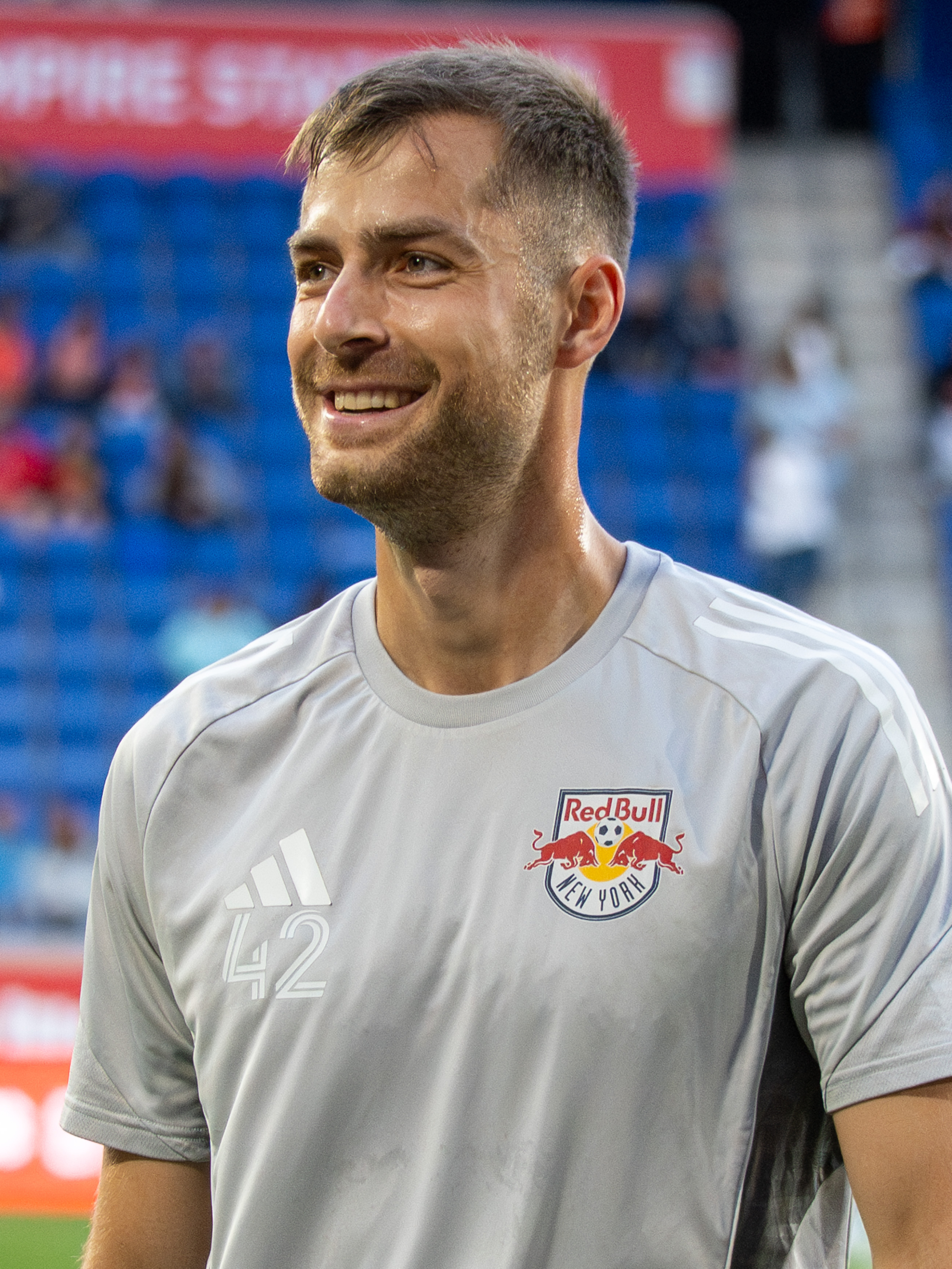
- Hack in 2025

Personal information
- Date of birth: 8 September 1993 (age 33)
- Place of birth: Memmingen, Germany
- Height: 1.93 m (6 ft 4 in)
- Position: Centre-back

Team information
- Current team: Zürich
- Number: 42

Youth career
- –2012: 1860 Munich

Senior career*
Years	Team	Apps	(Gls)
2012–2013	FC Memmingen	34	(2)
2013–2014	SpVgg Unterhaching	29	(1)
2014–2017	Mainz 05 II	43	(1)
2015–2023	Mainz 05	133	(6)
2023–2024	Al Qadsiah	27	(1)
2025–2026	New York Red Bulls	22	(1)
2026–	Zürich	19	(1)

International career
2013–2014	Germany U20	4	(0)
- * Club domestic league appearances and goals as of 28 September 2026

Alexander Hack (born 8 September 1993) is a German professional footballer who plays as a centre-back for Swiss Super League club Zürich.

== Club career ==
Hack started playing football for the youth teams of local clubs TSV 1862 Babenhausen and FC Memmingen, before joining 1860 Munich. In 2012 he went back to Memmingen and became a regular in the first team for the regional league team. After one season he moved to SpVgg Unterhaching in the third division and signed his first professional contract there.

=== Mainz 05 ===
He joined 1. FSV Mainz 05's reserve team from SpVgg Unterhaching in 2014 and became a regular starter. He made his first-team debut in the Bundesliga in the first half of the 2015–16 season on 28 November 2015, in a 3–1 win against Eintracht Frankfurt. On 8 December 2016, Hack scored his first international goal for Mainz in a 2–0 victory over Gabala SC in the UEFA Europa League.

In June 2017, Hack agreed a contract extension until 2022 with Mainz. On 13 January 2018, Hack scored his first goal in the Bundesliga in the 2–3 away defeat against Hannover 96. On 19 January 2019, Hack scored the winning goal for Mainz in a 2–3 victory over VfB Stuttgart. On 3 January 2021, Hack scored in a 5–2 loss to Bayern Munich.

Hack scored a career high 3 goals in 28 league appearances for Mainz during the 2021–22 Bundesliga season, as Mainz finished 8th in the league table. On 26 November 2021, Hack scored his first goal of the season in a 2–1 loss to VfB Stuttgart. Hack was on the scoresheet for Mainz on 14 December 2021 in a 4–0 victory over Hertha Berlin. On 12 February 2022, Hack scored the lone goal for Mainz in a 1–1 draw with SC Freiburg.

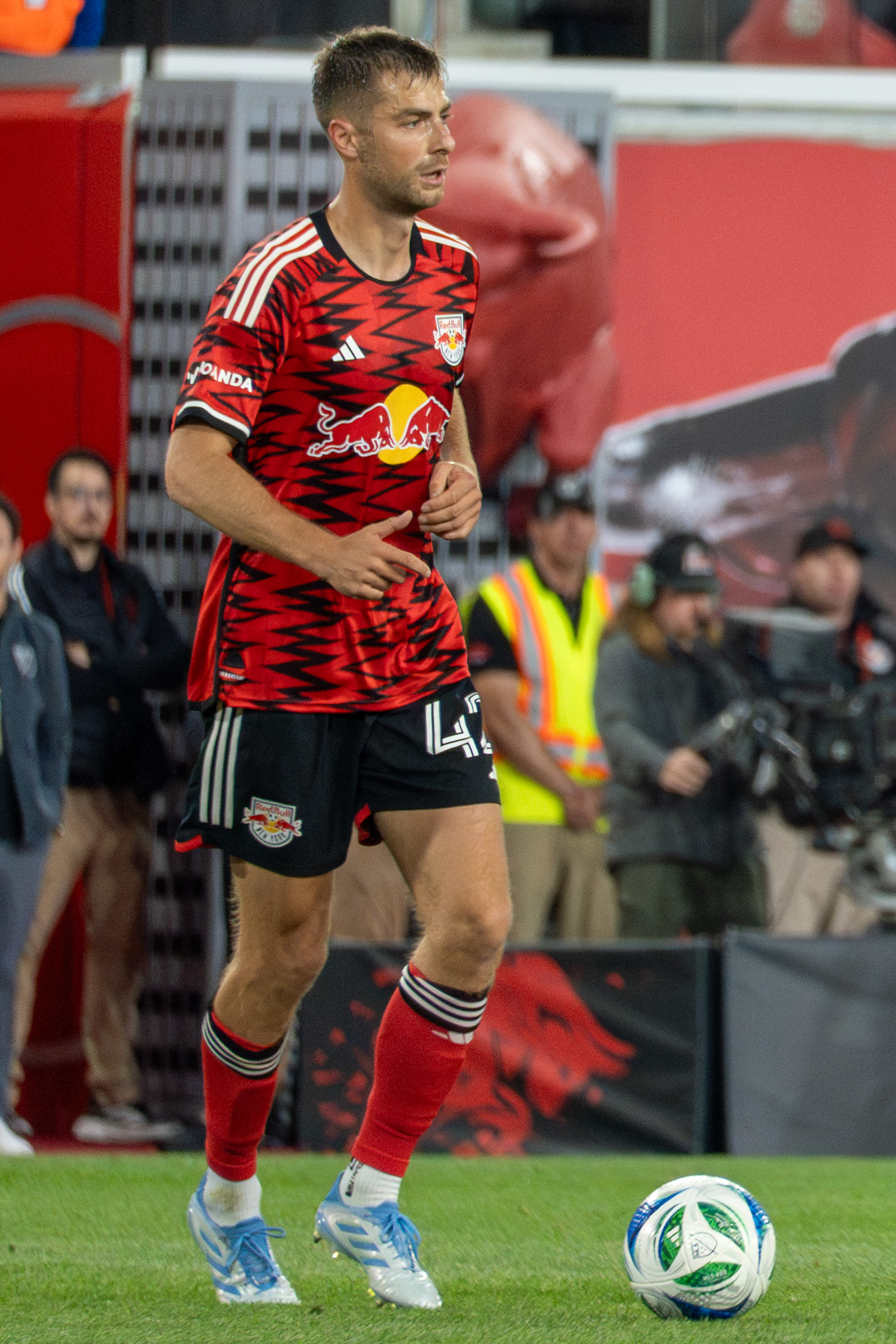
Hack playing for New York Red Bulls against Atlanta United on 31 May 2025

=== Al Qadsiah ===
On 14 August 2023, Mainz announced the transfer of Hack to Al Qadsiah in Saudi Arabia. Hack made his Saudi First Division League debut on 20 August 2023, in a 0–1 victory over Al-Jandal SC. On 16 April 2024, Hack scored his first goal for Al Qadsiah in a 0–3 victory over Jeddah Club. He ended his season in Saudi Arabia helping his club to win the 2023–24 Saudi First Division League and gain promotion to the top flight.

=== New York Red Bulls ===
Hack joined Major League Soccer club New York Red Bulls on a two-year contract with an additional club option year on 20 December 2024. On 5 January 2026, it was announced that Hack and the team had reached an agreement to mutually terminate his contract.

=== Zürich ===
In February 2026, Hack signed for Swiss club Zürich.

== Career statistics ==
As of match played 19 October 2025

Appearances and goals by club, season and competition
Club	Season	League			National cup (Note: Includes DFB-Pokal, King's Cup, and U.S. Open Cup)		Continental		Other		Total	
Club	Season	Division	Apps	Goals	Apps	Goals	Apps	Goals	Apps	Goals	Apps	Goals
FC Memmingen	2012–13	Regionalliga Bayern	33	2	—		—		—		33	2
SpVgg Unterhaching	2013–14	3. Liga	29	1	0	0	—		0	0	29	1
Mainz 05 II	2014–15	3. Liga	20	0	0	0	—		—		20	0
Mainz 05 II	2015–16	3. Liga	17	0	0	0	—		—		17	0
Mainz 05 II	2016–17	3. Liga	6	0	0	0	—		—		6	0
Mainz 05 II	Total		43	0	0	0	0	0	0	0	43	0
Mainz 05	2015–16	Bundesliga	7	0	0	0	0	0	0	0	7	0
Mainz 05	2016–17	Bundesliga	15	0	1	0	2 (Note: Appearances in UEFA Europa League)	1	0	0	18	1
Mainz 05	2017–18	Bundesliga	15	1	2	0	—		0	0	17	1
Mainz 05	2018–19	Bundesliga	14	1	1	0	—		—		15	1
Mainz 05	2019–20	Bundesliga	14	0	0	0	0	0	—		14	0
Mainz 05	2020–21	Bundesliga	21	1	1	0	0	0	—		22	1
Mainz 05	2021–22	Bundesliga	28	3	2	0	0	0	—		30	3
Mainz 05	2022–23	Bundesliga	19	0	3	1	—		—		22	1
Mainz 05	Total		133	6	10	1	2	1	0	0	145	8
Al-Qadsiah	2023–24	Saudi First Division League	27	1	1	0	—		—		28	1
New York Red Bulls	2025	Major League Soccer	22	1	2	0	—		1 (Note: Appearance in Leagues Cup)	0	25	1
Career total			287	11	13	1	3	1	0	0	303	13

== Honours ==
Al-Qadsiah

- Saudi First Division League: 2023–24
