= Robin Zentner =

German footballer

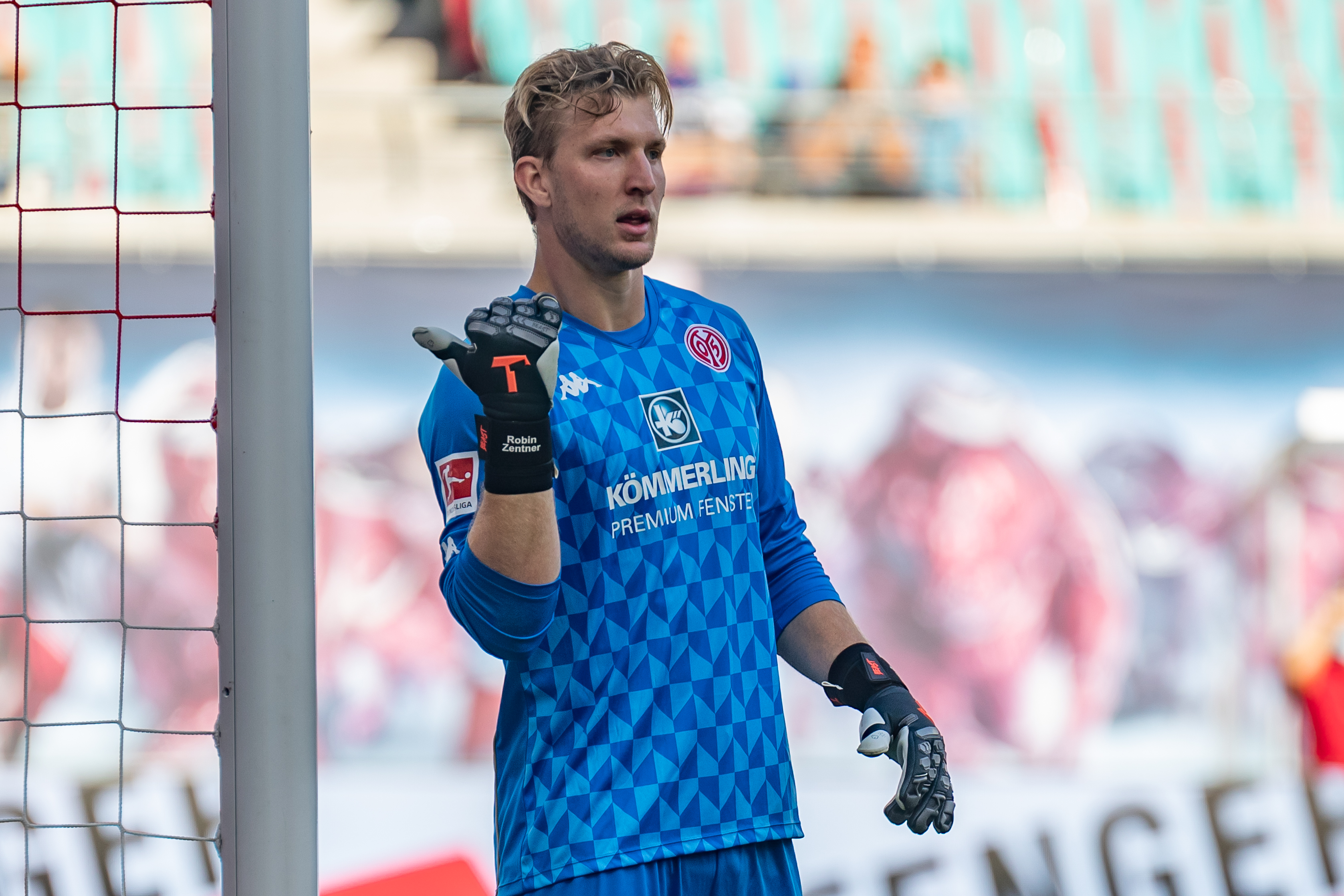
- Zentner playing for Mainz 05 in 2020

Personal information
- Full name: Robin Zentner
- Date of birth: 28 October 1994 (age 32)
- Place of birth: Rüdesheim am Rhein, Germany
- Height: 1.94 m (6 ft 4 in)
- Position: Goalkeeper

Team information
- Current team: Mainz 05
- Number: 27

Youth career
- 2006–2012: Mainz 05

Senior career*
Years	Team	Apps	(Gls)
2012–2015	Mainz 05 II	36	(0)
2014–	Mainz 05	211	(0)
2015–2017	→ Holstein Kiel (loan)	26	(0)

International career
2010	Germany U17	1	(0)
- * Club domestic league appearances and goals as of 30 October 2026

Robin Zentner (born 28 October 1994) is a German footballer who plays as a goalkeeper for Bundesliga club Mainz 05.

== Career ==
Zentner played for SpVgg Eltville until 2006, when he joined the youth team at 1. FSV Mainz 05. There, from 2012 until 2015, he was active in the Mainz team. Beginning in the 2014/15 season, he moved up to the senior squad as their third goalkeeper. In August 2015, he was loaned to then third-division Holstein Kiel, a loan deal which was extended for the subsequent 2016/17 season. He played 26 times across two seasons in Northern Germany before returning to Mainz in 2017/18.

He returned to Mainz 05 for the 2017/18 season and played his first competitive game for the first team in October 2017. In one of his appearances, on November 4, 2017, against Borussia Mönchengladbach, he went viral for an "air kick" after mistaking the penalty spot for the ball following a back-pass, which nearly resulted in a goal. For each of his first two seasons back from loan, he alternated with Florian Müller as the starting goalkeeper of the until he earned the starting job towards the beginning of the first half of the 2019/20 season. He suffered a torn cruciate ligament on March 8, 2020, in a Bundesliga match and missed the remainder of the season. He was named the undisputed starting goalkeeper at Mainz beginning in the 2020/21 season with Müller moving on to SC Freiburg. After agreeing to a new contract in January 2024, he is now signed through the 2027-2028 season with the Rhein club..

== Career statistics ==
As of match played 30 October 2026

Appearances and goals by club, season and competition
Club	Season	League			Cup		Europe		Other		Total	
Club	Season	Division	Apps	Goals	Apps	Goals	Apps	Goals	Apps	Goals	Apps	Goals
Mainz 05 II	2012–13	Regionalliga Südwest	2	0	—		—		—		0	0
Mainz 05 II	2013–14	Regionalliga Südwest	15	0	—		—		—		0	0
Mainz 05 II	2014–15	3. Liga	21	0	—		—		—		0	0
Mainz 05 II	Total		38	0	—		—		—		38	0
Mainz 05	2014–15	Bundesliga	0	0	0	0	—		—		0	0
Mainz 05	2015–16	Bundesliga	0	0	0	0	—		—		0	0
Mainz 05	2017–18	Bundesliga	15	0	2	0	—		—		17	0
Mainz 05	2018–19	Bundesliga	10	0	1	0	—		—		11	0
Mainz 05	2019–20	Bundesliga	22	0	0	0	—		—		22	0
Mainz 05	2020–21	Bundesliga	31	0	2	0	—		—		33	0
Mainz 05	2021–22	Bundesliga	32	0	3	0	—		—		35	0
Mainz 05	2022–23	Bundesliga	26	0	1	0	—		—		27	0
Mainz 05	2023–24	Bundesliga	30	0	2	0	—		—		32	0
Mainz 05	2024–25	Bundesliga	32	0	2	0	—		—		34	0
Mainz 05	2025–26	Bundesliga	10	0	2	0	6 (Note: Appearances in UEFA Conference League)	0	—		18	0
Mainz 05	2026–27	Bundesliga	3	0	1	0	—		—		4	0
Mainz 05	Total		210	0	16	0	6	0	—		232	0
Holstein Kiel (loan)	2015–16	3. Liga	25	0	0	0	—		0	0	25	0
Holstein Kiel (loan)	2016–17	3. Liga	1	0	0	0	—		1	0	2	0
Holstein Kiel (loan)	Total		26	0	0	0	—		1	0	27	0
Career total			275	0	16	0	6	0	1	0	298	0

== Honours ==
Individual

- Bundesliga Team of the Season: 2024–25
