= Niklas Tauer =

German footballer (born 2001)

Personal information
- Date of birth: 17 February 2001 (age 25)
- Place of birth: Mainz, Germany
- Height: 1.83 m (6 ft 0 in)
- Position: Defensive midfielder

Team information
- Current team: TSV Havelse
- Number: 5

Youth career
- 2005–2010: SpVgg Selzen
- 2010–2012: SV Weisenau
- 2012–2020: Mainz 05

Senior career*
Years	Team	Apps	(Gls)
2020–2026	Mainz 05	19	(0)
2020–2022	Mainz 05 II	19	(1)
2023	→ Schalke 04 (loan)	1	(0)
2023	→ Schalke 04 II (loan)	4	(1)
2024–2025	→ Eintracht Braunschweig (loan)	23	(0)
2025–2026	Mainz 05 II	15	(1)
2026–	TSV Havelse	0	(0)

International career
2018–2019	Germany U18	6	(0)
2019	Germany U19	5	(2)
2020–2022	Germany U20	7	(1)
- * Club domestic league appearances and goals as of 16 July 2026

Niklas Tauer (born 17 February 2001) is a German professional footballer who plays as a defensive midfielder for TSV Havelse.

== Career ==
Tauer made his debut for Mainz 05 in the first round of the 2020–21 DFB-Pokal on 11 September 2020, coming on as a substitute in the 85th minute for Jean-Paul Boëtius against fourth-division side TSV Havelse, with the match finishing as a 5–1 win. He made his Bundesliga debut the following week on 20 September, coming on as a substitute for Danny Latza in the 86th minute of Mainz's away match against RB Leipzig, which finished as a 3–1 loss.

On 21 December 2022, Schalke 04 announced the signing of Tauer on a one-and-a-half-year loan, which ended early on 3 January 2024. On the same day, Tauer moved on a new loan to Eintracht Braunschweig. The loan was extended for the 2024–25 season.

Tauer joined TSV Havelse ahead of the 2026–27 season.

== Career statistics ==
As of 3 January 2024

Appearances and goals by club, season and competition
Club	Season	League			Cup		Total	
Club	Season	Division	Apps	Goals	Apps	Goals	Apps	Goals
Mainz 05	2020–21	Bundesliga	5	0	1	0	6	0
Mainz 05	2021–22	Bundesliga	11	0	0	0	11	0
Mainz 05	2022–23	Bundesliga	3	0	1	0	4	0
Mainz 05	Total		19	0	2	0	21	0
Mainz 05 II	2020–21	Regionalliga Südwest	15	1	—		15	1
Mainz 05 II	2021–22	Regionalliga Südwest	4	0	—		4	0
Mainz 05 II	Total		19	1	—		19	1
Schalke 04 II (loan)	2022–23	Regionalliga West	2	1	—		2	1
Schalke 04 II (loan)	2023–24	Regionalliga West	2	0	—		2	0
Schalke 04 II (loan)	Total		4	1	—		4	1
Schalke 04 (loan)	2022–23	Bundesliga	0	0	—		0	0
Schalke 04 (loan)	2023–24	2. Bundesliga	1	0	1	0	2	0
Schalke 04 (loan)	Total		1	0	1	0	2	0
Eintracht Braunschweig (loan)	2023–24	2. Bundesliga	0	0	—		0	0
Career total			43	2	3	0	46	2
