= Anton Stach =

German footballer (born 1998)

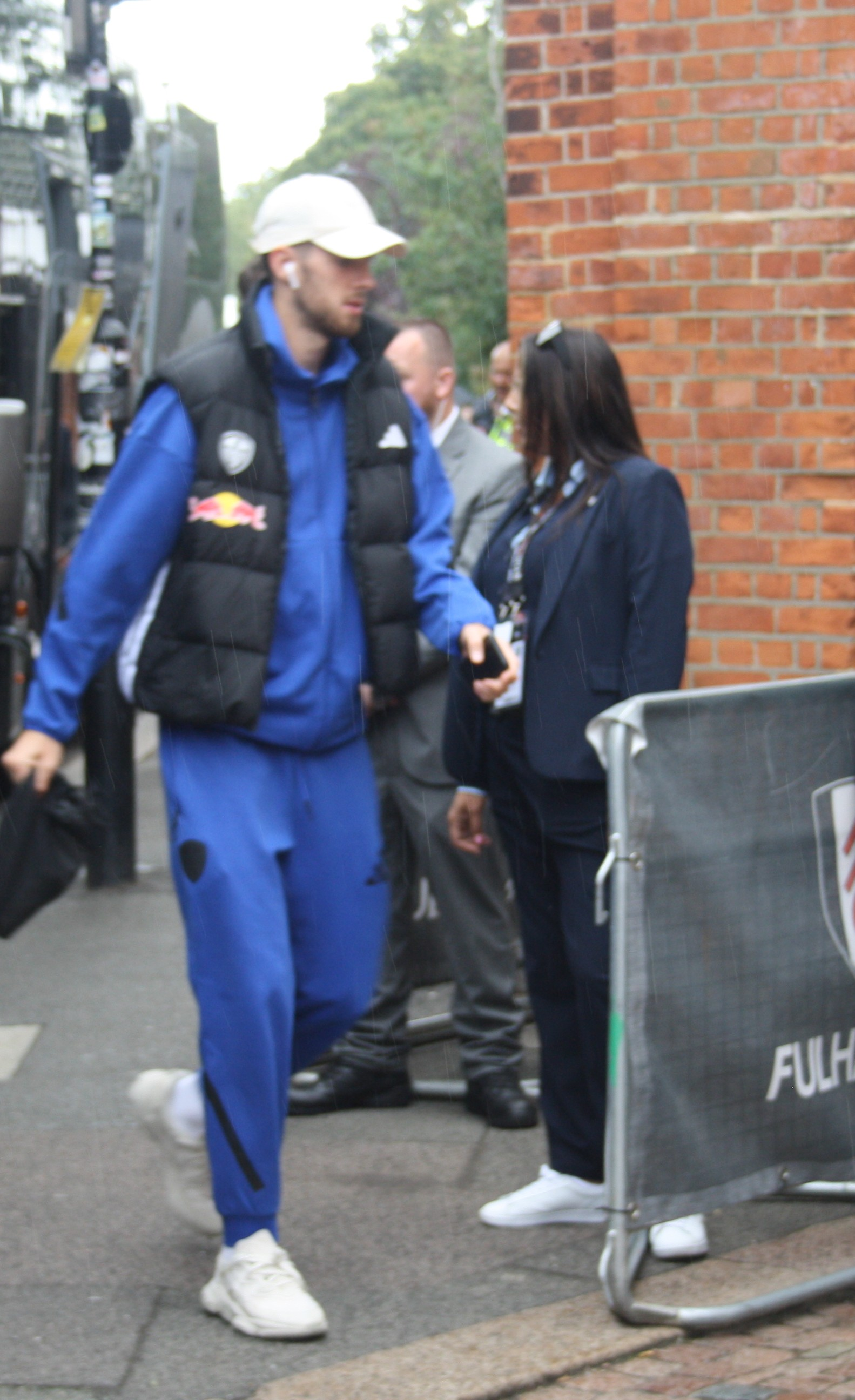
- Stach with Leeds United in 2025

Personal information
- Full name: Anton Levi Stach
- Date of birth: 15 November 1998 (age 27)
- Place of birth: Buchholz in der Nordheide, Germany
- Height: 1.93 m (6 ft 4 in)
- Position: Central midfielder

Team information
- Current team: Leeds United
- Number: 18

Youth career
- 2011: Buchholzer FC
- 2011–2015: Werder Bremen
- 2015–2016: JFV Nordwest
- 2016–2017: VfL Osnabrück

Senior career*
| Years | Team | Apps | (Gls) |
| 2017 | VfL Osnabrück II | 1 | (0) |
| 2017–2018 | SSV Jeddeloh | 23 | (4) |
| 2018–2020 | VfL Wolfsburg II | 40 | (6) |
| 2020–2021 | Greuther Fürth | 30 | (1) |
| 2021–2023 | Mainz 05 | 61 | (2) |
| 2023–2025 | TSG Hoffenheim | 61 | (3) |
| 2025– | Leeds United | 30 | (6) |

International career^{‡}
| 2021 | Germany U21 | 5 | (0) |
| 2021 | Germany Olympic | 3 | (0) |
| 2022– | Germany | 5 | (0) |
Medal record
UEFA European Under-21 Championship
| Winner | 2021 |
- * Club domestic league appearances and goals as of 17:04, 22 August 2026 (UTC) ‡ National team caps and goals as of 20:50, 27 September 2026 (UTC)

Anton Levi Stach (born 15 November 1998) is a German professional footballer who plays as a central midfielder for Premier League club Leeds United and the Germany national team.

== Club career ==
Stach was born in the town of Buchholz in der Nordheide, Germany, in the Hamburg Metropolitan Region and joined Buchholzer FC during his childhood. Since 2010, he participated in training at Werder Bremen once a week, before he joined the youth academy of Bremen-based Nachwuchsleistungszentrum one year later. Stach played for Werder Bremen until the B-youth, and became captain of Werder Bremen's under-16 side. He later played at JFV Nordwest. Afterwards, he joined the U19-team of VfL Osnabrück.

For the 2017–18 season, Stach joined SSV Jeddeloh from Regionalliga Nord, a regional league at the fourth-tier of German football. After a one year, he moved to VfL Wolfsburg II, also in the Regionalliga Nord. With the second team of VfL Wolfsburg II, he reached the play-off round for the promotion to the professional 3. Liga, the third-highest level of German football, but the Lower Saxonians lost against Bayern Munich II.

In the 2020–21 season, Stach left Lower Saxony and joined Franconia-based Greuther Fürth from the second German division, where he signed a contract until July 2023. Stach helped the team achieve promotion to the Bundesliga.

In July 2021, Stach joined fellow German club Mainz 05 on a deal until July 2024. Later that year, on 4 December, he scored his first Bundesliga goal in a 3–0 victory over VfL Wolfsburg.

On 1 September 2023, Stach signed a four-year contract with TSG Hoffenheim. Two months later, on 4 November, he scored his first goal for Hoffenheim in a 3–2 home defeat against Bayer Leverkusen. He finished the 2023–24 season with 408 duels won, the second most only behind Bernardo.

On 22 July 2025, Stach moved to England, joining Premier League club Leeds United on a four-year contract worth reportedly £17 million. Two months later, on 20 September, he scored his first goal for Leeds in a 3–1 away win Vs Wolverhampton Wanderers.

== International career ==
In March 2021, Stach was called up for the Germany national under-21 football team for the group stage of the 2021 UEFA European Under-21 Championship. The matches were broadcast live in Germany at ProSieben and ProSieben MAXX and his father Matthias Stach was the commentator during the group stage. The player was substituted in the second match against the Netherlands and his father said "Blamier' mich nicht, Junge!" (in English "Don't embarrass me, boy!" or "Don't embarrass me, son!"). Germany advanced past the group stage as Stach made two appearances. In July 2021, he was also a part of the German squad for the knockout stage of the tournament, playing in all three matches as Germany reached the final, where they won 1–0 against Portugal.

Stach was called up to the senior Germany squad for friendly matches against Israel and the Netherlands on 26 and 29 March 2022, respectively. Stach was substituted in the 2–0 win against Israel in Sinsheim in the 64th minute for Julian Weigl.

== Personal life ==
Stach's father, Matthias Stach, is a sports commentator in Germany. His sisters Emma and Lotta both play professional basketball in the German DBB. his sisters, Emma and Lotta, play basketball.

== Career statistics ==
=== Club ===
As of match played 22 August 2026

Appearances and goals by club, season and competition
| Club | Season | League | | | National cup (Note: Includes DFB-Pokal, FA Cup) | | League cup (Note: Includes EFL Cup) | | Europe | | Other | | Total | |
| Club | Season | Division | Apps | Goals | Apps | Goals | Apps | Goals | Apps | Goals | Apps | Goals | Apps | Goals |
|---|---|---|---|---|---|---|---|---|---|---|---|---|---|---|
| VfL Osnabrück II | 2016–17 | Oberliga Niedersachsen | 1 | 0 | — | | — | | — | | — | | 1 | 0 |
| SSV Jeddeloh | 2017–18 | Regionalliga Nord | 23 | 4 | 4 | 0 | — | | — | | — | | 27 | 4 |
| VfL Wolfsburg II | 2018–19 | Regionalliga Nord | 20 | 4 | — | | — | | — | | — | | 20 | 4 |
| VfL Wolfsburg II | 2019–20 | Regionalliga Nord | 20 | 2 | — | | — | | — | | — | | 20 | 2 |
| VfL Wolfsburg II | Total | | 40 | 6 | — | | — | | — | | — | | 40 | 6 |
| Greuther Fürth | 2020–21 | 2. Bundesliga | 30 | 1 | 3 | 0 | — | | — | | — | | 33 | 1 |
| Mainz 05 | 2021–22 | Bundesliga | 29 | 1 | 3 | 0 | — | | — | | — | | 32 | 1 |
| Mainz 05 | 2022–23 | Bundesliga | 30 | 1 | 3 | 0 | — | | — | | — | | 33 | 1 |
| Mainz 05 | 2023–24 | Bundesliga | 2 | 0 | 1 | 0 | — | | — | | — | | 3 | 0 |
| Mainz 05 | Total | | 61 | 2 | 7 | 0 | — | | — | | — | | 68 | 2 |
| TSG Hoffenheim | 2023–24 | Bundesliga | 31 | 2 | 2 | 0 | — | | — | | — | | 33 | 2 |
| TSG Hoffenheim | 2024–25 | Bundesliga | 30 | 1 | 3 | 0 | — | | 6 (Note: Appearances in UEFA Europa League) | 1 | — | | 39 | 2 |
| TSG Hoffenheim | Total | | 61 | 3 | 5 | 0 | — | | 6 | 1 | — | | 72 | 4 |
| Leeds United | 2025–26 | Premier League | 29 | 5 | 4 | 0 | 1 | 0 | — | | — | | 34 | 5 |
| Leeds United | 2026–27 | Premier League | 1 | 1 | 0 | 0 | 0 | 0 | — | | — | | 1 | 1 |
| Leeds United | Total | | 30 | 6 | 4 | 0 | 1 | 0 | — | | — | | 35 | 6 |
| Career total | | | 246 | 22 | 23 | 0 | 1 | 0 | 6 | 1 | 0 | 0 | 276 | 23 |

=== International ===
As of match played 27 September 2026

Appearances and goals by national team and year
| National team | Year | Apps | Goals |
|---|---|---|---|
| Germany | 2022 | 2 | 0 |
| Germany | 2026 | 3 | 0 |
| Total | | 5 | 0 |
