= Jonathan Burkardt =

German footballer (born 2000)

Personal information
- Full name: Jonathan Michael Burkardt
- Date of birth: 11 July 2000 (age 26)
- Place of birth: Darmstadt, Germany
- Height: 1.81 m (5 ft 11 in)
- Position: Forward

Team information
- Current team: Eintracht Frankfurt
- Number: 9

Youth career
- 2009–2014: Darmstadt 98
- 2014–2018: Mainz 05 II

Senior career*
Years	Team	Apps	(Gls)
2019-2020	Mainz 05	4	(1)
2018–2025	Mainz 05	136	(41)
2025–	Eintracht Frankfurt	30	(16)

International career^{‡}
2015	Germany U15	2	(1)
2015–2016	Germany U16	10	(6)
2016	Germany U17	1	(2)
2017	Germany U18	1	(0)
2019	Germany U19	3	(1)
2019	Germany U20	5	(0)
2020–2022	Germany U21	20	(10)
2024–	Germany	8	(1)
Medal record
UEFA European Under-21 Championship
Gold medal – first place	2021
- * Club domestic league appearances and goals as of 1 November 2026 ‡ National team caps and goals as of 4 October 2026

Jonathan Michael "Jonny" Burkardt (born 11 July 2000) is a German footballer who plays as a forward for Bundesliga club Eintracht Frankfurt and the Germany national team.

== Club career ==
=== Mainz 05 ===
Burkardt joined the Mainz 05 youth performance center from SV Darmstadt 98 in 2014, playing in the B-Youth and A-Youth Bundesliga. He signed a professional contract in June 2018, making his Bundesliga debut on September 15, 2018, in a 2–1 win against FC Augsburg. During the 2020–21 season, he played in 29 Bundesliga games, scoring two goals, including the opening goal in a 2–1 victory over Bayern Munich. In the first half of the 2021–22 season, he scored seven goals in 17 games and was named "Rising Star of the Season" in a Kicker poll. He finished the season with 11 Bundesliga goals, becoming Mainz's top scorer.

In the 2022–23 season, he missed several games due to injury, scoring his first goal on November 13, 2022, against Eintracht Frankfurt before suffering a knee injury. After surgery, he returned on November 26, 2023, and scored eight goals in 21 league games that season. In January 2024, his contract with Mainz was extended until 2027.

=== Eintracht Frankfurt ===
On 4 July 2025, Burkardt signed a contract with Eintracht Frankfurt valid until 2030. Burkardt made his Bundesliga debut with the Hessian club on August 23rd at the Waldstadion as Frankfurt defeated Werder Bremen 4–1 in the Eröffnungsspiel for the 2025–26 season. A month later, on 18 September, he made his UEFA Champions League debut, scoring a brace in a 5–1 victory over Galatasaray. Following his braces against Freiburg and St. Pauli, he is awarded Bundesliga Player of the Month October.

== International career ==
Burkardt was a youth international footballer for Germany. He was named in the Germany U21 squad for the 2021 UEFA European Championship. He eventually achieved the title with his nation following a 1–0 victory over Portugal in the final.

In October 2024, he was selected by coach Julian Nagelsmann to represent the German national team, replacing injured Kai Havertz, for the UEFA Nations League matches against Bosnia and Herzegovina and the Netherlands. On 11 October 2024, he made his senior debut in a 2–1 away victory against Bosnia and Herzegovina in the UEFA Nations League.

== Career statistics ==
=== Club ===
As of match played 1 November 2026

Appearances and goals by club, season and competition
Club	Season	League			DFB-Pokal		Europe		Total	
Club	Season	Division	Apps	Goals	Apps	Goals	Apps	Goals	Apps	Goals
Mainz 05	2018–19	Bundesliga	4	0	0	0	—		4	0
Mainz 05	2019–20	Bundesliga	8	1	1	0	—		9	1
Mainz 05	2020–21	Bundesliga	29	2	2	0	—		31	2
Mainz 05	2021–22	Bundesliga	34	11	3	3	—		37	14
Mainz 05	2022–23	Bundesliga	11	1	1	0	—		12	1
Mainz 05	2023–24	Bundesliga	21	8	0	0	—		21	8
Mainz 05	2024–25	Bundesliga	29	18	1	1	—		30	19
Mainz 05	Total		136	41	8	4	—		144	45
Mainz 05 II	2018–19	Regionalliga Südwest	2	0	—		—		2	0
Mainz 05 II	2019–20	Regionalliga Südwest	2	1	—		—		2	1
Mainz 05 II	Total		4	1	—		—		4	1
Eintracht Frankfurt	2025–26	Bundesliga	22	13	2	0	5 (Note: Appearances in UEFA Champions League)	2	29	15
Eintracht Frankfurt	2026–27	Bundesliga	8	3	2	4	—		10	7
Eintracht Frankfurt	Total		30	16	4	4	5	2	39	22
Career total			170	58	12	8	5	2	187	68

=== International ===
As of match played 4 October 2026

Appearances and goals by national team and year
National team	Year	Apps	Goals
Germany	2024	2	0
Germany	2025	3	0
Germany	2026	3	0
Total		8	0

== Honours ==
Germany U21

- UEFA European Under-21 Championship: 2021

Individual

- Bundesliga Player of the Month: October 2025
