= Finn Dahmen =

German footballer

Personal information
- Full name: Finn Gilbert Dahmen
- Date of birth: 27 March 1998 (age 28)
- Place of birth: Wiesbaden, Germany
- Height: 1.86 m (6 ft 1 in)
- Position: Goalkeeper

Team information
- Current team: FC Augsburg
- Number: 1

Youth career
- 2002–2006: FC Bierstadt
- 2006–2008: Eintracht Frankfurt
- 2008–2017: Mainz 05

Senior career*
Years	Team	Apps	(Gls)
2017–2021	Mainz 05 II	70	(1)
2018–2023	Mainz 05	13	(0)
2023–	FC Augsburg	92	(0)

International career^{‡}
2012	Germany U15	1	(0)
2014	Germany U17	3	(0)
2015–2016	Germany U18	3	(0)
2016	Germany U19	2	(0)
2018	Germany U20	3	(0)
2020–2021	Germany U21	8	(0)
2025–	Germany	0	(0)
Medal record
UEFA European Under-21 Championship
Winner	2021
- * Club domestic league appearances and goals as of 31 October 2026 ‡ National team caps and goals as of 20:56, 6 June 2021 (UTC)

Finn Gilbert Dahmen (born 27 March 1998) is a German professional footballer who plays as a goalkeeper for Bundesliga club FC Augsburg.

== Club career ==
Dahmen began his youth career at FC Bierstadt and Eintracht Frankfurt, before joining the academy of Mainz 05 in 2008. In 2017, he was promoted to Mainz's second team, and made his debut in the Regionalliga Südwest on 30 July 2017 against FSV Frankfurt, which finished as a 3–0 home win. On 26 March 2018, Dahmen signed a long-term contract with the club until 2020. On 11 April 2018, he scored for Mainz II in the second minute of second-half stoppage time against VfB Stuttgart II to secure a 1–1 draw, having scored with a backheel after coming forward for a Mainz free kick. On 10 May 2019, he signed a long-term contract with the club until 30 June 2023. He made his professional debut for Mainz's first team on 3 January 2021, starting in the away match against Bayern Munich. Having led 2–0 at half-time, the match finished as a 5–2 loss for Mainz. Head coach Bo Svensson selected Dahman for the last two matches of the 2021–2022 season. In February 2023, he announced to leave Mainz at the end of the season to play regular first-team football.

On 1 June 2023, Dahmen signed a contract with FC Augsburg. On 2 March 2025, he broke FC Augsburg's club record, after going 433 minutes without conceding a goal, breaking Marwin Hitz's record of 399 minutes. On 2 May 2025, after making his 50th league appearance for the club, Dahmen's contract was extended until 30 June 2027 due to a clause in his contract.

== International career ==
Dahmen has played for the Germany under-15 and under-17 to under-21 national teams. He was included in the under-17 national team squad for the 2015 FIFA U-17 World Cup in Chile. However, he did not appear in the tournament.

In August 2025, Dahmen received his first call-up to the German senior team, after being named in coach Julian Nagelsmann’s squad for the 2026 World Cup qualifiers.

On September 2026, he was one of players who were called up with the Germany national team by head coach Jürgen Klopp for the 2026–27 UEFA Nations League matches against Netherlands, Greece, Serbia and Greece between 24 September and 4 October 2026.

== Personal life ==
Dahmen was born in Wiesbaden, Hesse, to an English mother and a German father.

== Career statistics ==
As of match played 31 October 2026

Appearances and goals by club, season and competition
Club	Season	League			DFB-Pokal		Other		Total	
Club	Season	Division	Apps	Goals	Apps	Goals	Apps	Goals	Apps	Goals
Mainz 05 II	2017–18	Regionalliga Südwest	27	1	—		—		27	1
Mainz 05 II	2018–19	Regionalliga Südwest	32	0	—		—		32	0
Mainz 05 II	2019–20	Regionalliga Südwest	10	0	—		—		10	0
Mainz 05 II	2020–21	Regionalliga Südwest	1	0	—		—		1	0
Mainz 05 II	Total		70	1	—		—		70	1
Mainz 05	2017–18	Bundesliga	0	0	0	0	—		0	0
Mainz 05	2018–19	Bundesliga	0	0	0	0	—		0	0
Mainz 05	2019–20	Bundesliga	0	0	0	0	—		0	0
Mainz 05	2020–21	Bundesliga	3	0	0	0	—		3	0
Mainz 05	2021–22	Bundesliga	2	0	0	0	—		2	0
Mainz 05	2022–23	Bundesliga	8	0	2	0	—		10	0
Mainz 05	Total		13	0	2	0	—		15	0
FC Augsburg	2023–24	Bundesliga	31	0	1	0	—		32	0
FC Augsburg	2024–25	Bundesliga	19	0	2	0	—		21	0
FC Augsburg	2025–26	Bundesliga	34	0	1	0	—		35	0
FC Augsburg	2026–27	Bundesliga	8	0	2	0	—		10	0
FC Augsburg	Total		92	0	6	0	—		98	0
Career total			176	1	8	0	0	0	184	1

== Honours ==
Individual

- VDV Bundesliga Team of the Season: 2024–25
