= Timothé Rupil =

Luxembourgish footballer

Personal information
- Full name: Timothé Rupil
- Date of birth: 12 June 2003 (age 23)
- Place of birth: Luxembourg
- Height: 1.71 m (5 ft 7 in)
- Position: Midfielder

Team information
- Current team: Helsingborgs
- Number: 22

Youth career
- 2010–2015: ES Clemency
- 2015–2019: UN Käerjéng 97
- 2019–2022: Mainz 05

Senior career*
Years	Team	Apps	(Gls)
2021–2024	Mainz 05 II	50	(7)
2024–2026	Schalke 04 II	24	(2)
2026–	Helsingborgs	15	(1)

International career^{‡}
2018–2019	Luxembourg U17	8	(0)
2020–2022	Luxembourg U21	9	(0)
2020–	Luxembourg	17	(0)
- * Club domestic league appearances and goals as of 12 November 2026 ‡ National team caps and goals as of 16 November 2026

Timothé Rupil (born 12 June 2003) is a Luxembourgish footballer who plays as a midfielder for Superettan club Helsingborgs and the Luxembourg national team.

== Club career ==
On 12 June 2024, Rupil signed with Schalke 04 II.

On 11 February 2026, Rupil signed a two-year contract with Swedish Superettan club Helsingborgs IF.

== International career ==
Rupil made his international debut for Luxembourg on 7 October 2020 in a friendly match against Liechtenstein, which finished as a 1–2 home loss.

== Career statistics ==
=== Club ===
As of match played 12 November 2026

Appearances and goals by club, season and competition
Club	Season	League			Cup		Total	
Club	Season	Division	Apps	Goals	Apps	Goals	Apps	Goals
Mainz 05 II	2020–21	Regionalliga Südwest	3	0	—		3	0
Mainz 05 II	2021–22	Regionalliga Südwest	7	0	—		7	0
Mainz 05 II	2022–23	Regionalliga Südwest	25	4	—		25	4
Mainz 05 II	2023–24	Regionalliga Südwest	15	3	—		15	3
Mainz 05 II	Total		50	7	—		50	7
Schalke 04 II	2024–25	Regionalliga West	20	2	—		20	2
Schalke 04 II	2025–26	Regionalliga West	4	0	—		4	0
Schalke 04 II	Total		24	2	—		24	2
Helsingborg	2026	Superettan	15	1	4	2	19	3
Career total			89	10	4	2	93	12

=== International ===
As of match played 16 November 2026

Appearances and goals by national team and year
National team	Year	Apps	Goals
Luxembourg
Luxembourg	2020	1	0
Luxembourg	2021	1	0
Luxembourg	2022	4	0
Luxembourg	2023	4	0
Luxembourg	2024	2	0
Luxembourg	2025	0	0
Luxembourg	2026	5	0
Total		17	0
