= Pierre Kunde =

Cameroonian footballer (born 1995)

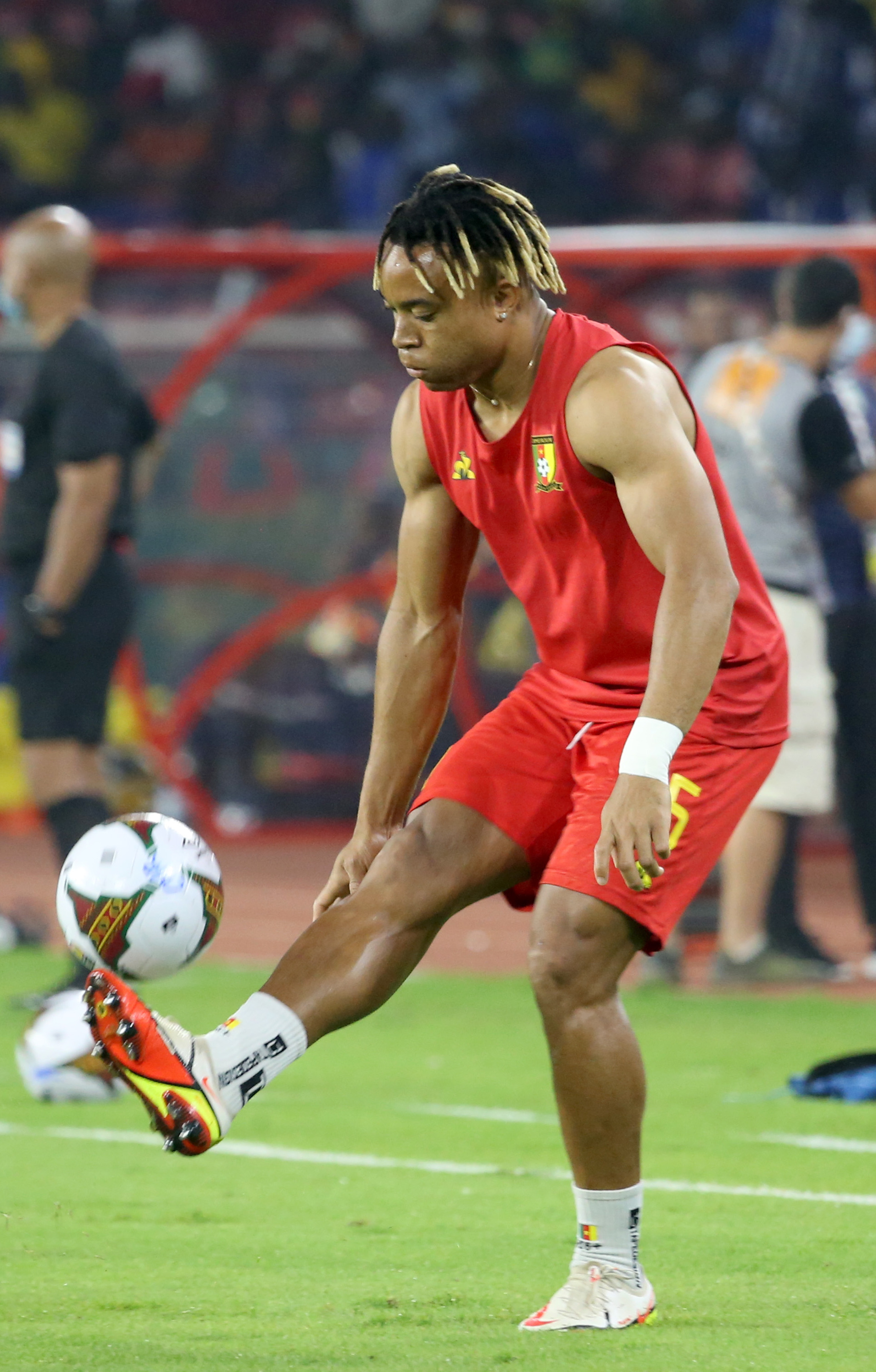
- Kunde with Cameroon in 2022

Personal information
- Full name: Pierre Kunde Malong
- Date of birth: 26 July 1995 (age 31)
- Place of birth: Limbé, Cameroon
- Height: 1.80 m (5 ft 11 in)
- Position: Central midfielder

Team information
- Current team: Dibba Al-Hisn
- Number: 25

Youth career
- 2012–2013: Alcobendas
- 2013–2014: Atlético Madrid

Senior career*
Years	Team	Apps	(Gls)
2012–2013	Alcobendas	25	(6)
2014–2018	Atlético Madrid B	71	(4)
2016–2017	→ Extremadura (loan)	33	(11)
2017–2018	→ Granada (loan)	37	(5)
2018–2021	Mainz 05	68	(4)
2021–2024	Olympiacos	14	(0)
2023	→ VfL Bochum (loan)	12	(1)
2023–2024	→ Atromitos (loan)	27	(0)
2024–2025	Dibba Al-Hisn	24	(7)
2025–2026	Khor Fakkan	5	(0)
2026–	Dibba Al-Hisn	0	(0)

International career^{‡}
- Cameroon U18
2017–2018	Cameroon U23	5	(0)
2018–	Cameroon	41	(1)
Medal record
Men's football
Representing Cameroon
Africa Cup of Nations
Third place	2021 Cameroon
- * Club domestic league appearances and goals as of 27 April 2024 ‡ National team caps and goals as of 11 June 2024

Pierre Kunde Malong (born 26 July 1995) is a Cameroonian professional footballer who plays for UAE Club Dibba Al-Hisn and the Cameroon national team as a central midfielder.

== Club career ==
Born in Limbe, he spent time at the Best stars academy in limbe Cameroon then Malong started his senior career in Spain with Alcobendas CF; he made his senior debut for the club on 11 November 2012 by starting in a 2–0 Regional Preferente home win against EF Periso. His first goal came the following 3 March, in a 2–0 success at Atlético Leones de Castilla.

In 2013 Kunde moved to Atlético Madrid, returning to youth football. The following year, he was promoted to the reserves in Segunda División B, immediately becoming a regular starter but suffering relegation in his first season.

On 21 July 2016, Kunde was loaned to Extremadura UD for one year, still in the third division. He scored a career-best 11 goals during the campaign, with braces against San Fernando CD (3–1 away win), Linares Deportivo (3–1 away win) and Atlético Mancha Real (2–1 away win).

On 25 July 2017, Kunde joined Granada CF, freshly relegated to Segunda División, on a one-year loan deal. He made his professional debut on 20 August, coming on a late substitute for Javier Espinosa in a 0–0 home draw against Albacete Balompié.

Kunde scored his first professional goal on 8 October 2017, netting the last in a 2–0 home defeat of CD Lugo. The following 22 April, he scored a brace in a 3–3 home draw against Cultural y Deportiva Leonesa.

On 6 July 2018, Kunde was transferred to Bundesliga side 1. FSV Mainz 05 and signed a four-year contract.

On 22 June 2021, Kunde sign a three-year contract with Greek giants Olympiacos after undergoing a medical. The Greek side reportedly paid less than €2 million for the 25-year-old international, whose contract with Mainz was due to expire in 2022.

== International career ==
Kunde represented Cameroon at under-18 and under-23 levels, the latter in the 2017 Islamic Solidarity Games. He made his full international debut on 27 May 2018, starting in a 0–1 friendly loss against Burkina Faso.

== Career statistics ==
=== Club ===
As of match played 20 May 2023

Appearances and goals by club, season and competition
Club	Season	League			National cup (Note: Includes Copa del Rey, DFB-Pokal, Greek Football Cup)		Europe		Total	
Club	Season	Division	Apps	Goals	Apps	Goals	Apps	Goals	Apps	Goals
Extremadura	2016–17	Segunda División B	33	11	2	0	–		35	11
Granada	2017–18	Segunda División	37	5	1	0	–		38	5
Mainz 05	2018–19	Bundesliga	29	0	2	0	–		31	0
Mainz 05	2019–20	Bundesliga	28	4	0	0	–		28	4
Mainz 05	2020–21	Bundesliga	11	0	0	0	–		11	0
Mainz 05	Total		68	4	2	0	–		70	4
Olympiacos	2021–22	Super League Greece	12	0	4	0	10 (Note: Four appearances in UEFA Champions League, six appearances in UEFA Europa League)	0	26	0
Olympiacos	2022–23	Super League Greece	2	0	0	0	11 (Note: One appearance in UEFA Champions League, ten appearances in UEFA Europa League)	0	13	0
Olympiacos	Total		14	0	4	0	21	0	39	0
VfL Bochum (loan)	2022–23	Bundesliga	12	1	1	0	–		13	1
Atromitos (Ioan)	2023–24	Super League Greece	0	0	0	0	–		0	0
Career total			164	21	10	0	21	0	195	21

=== International ===
As of match played 11 June 2023

Cameroon
Year	Apps	Goals
2018	5	0
2019	9	0
2020	2	0
2021	8	1
2022	10	0
2023	3	0
Total	37	1

Scores and results list Cameroon's goal tally first, score column indicates score after each Kunde goal.

List of international goals scored by Pierre Kunde
No.	Date	Venue	Opponent	Score	Result	Competition	Ref.
1	26 March 2021	Estádio Nacional de Cabo Verde, Praia, Cape Verde	Cape Verde	1–0	1–3	2022 African Nations Championship qualification	

== Honours ==
Olympiacos

- Super League Greece: 2021–22

Cameroon

- Africa Cup of Nations third place: 2021
