= Marlon Mustapha =

Austrian footballer (born 2001)

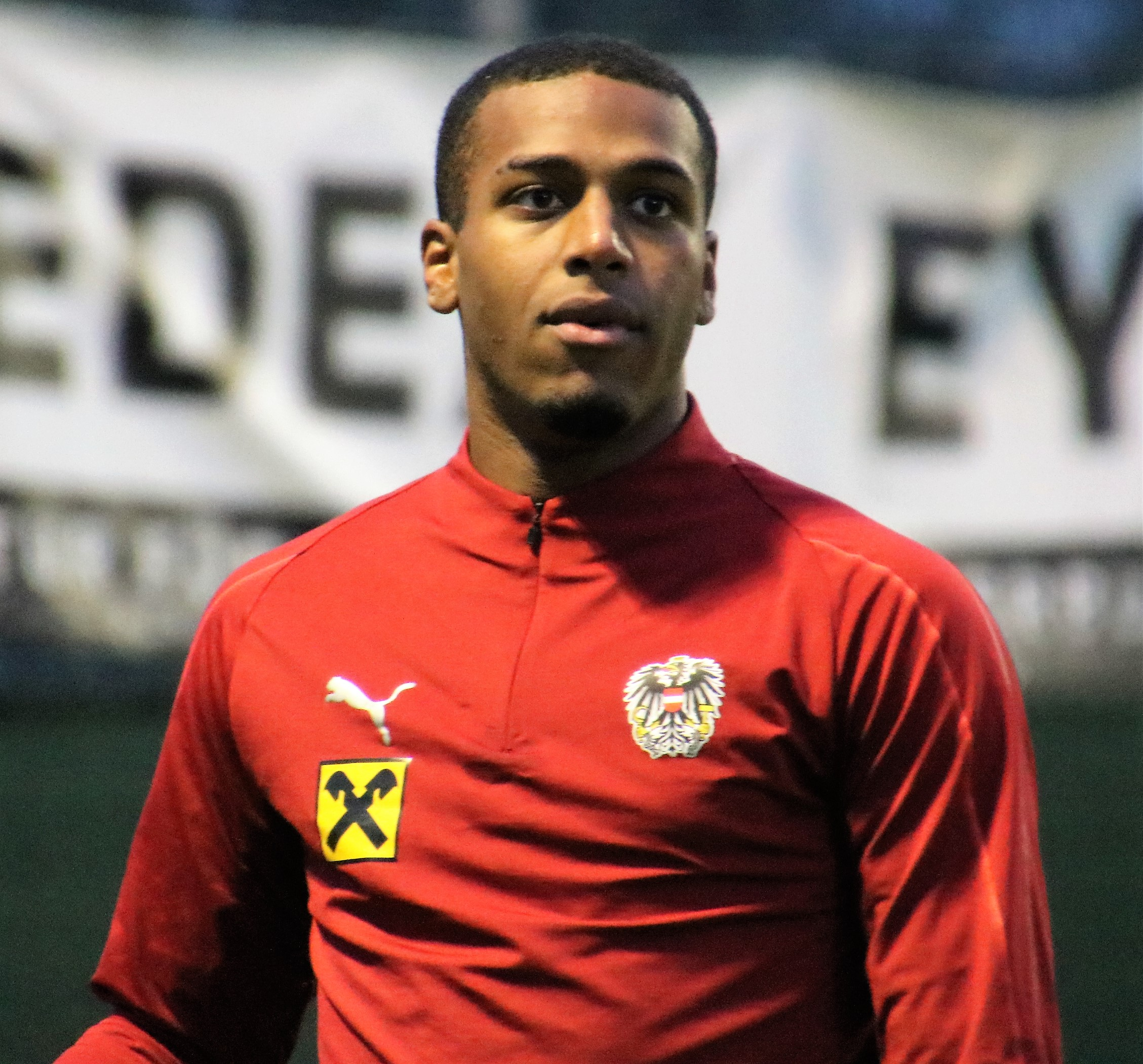
- Mustapha with Austria U19 in 2019

Personal information
- Full name: Suliman-Marlon Mustapha
- Date of birth: 24 May 2001 (age 25)
- Place of birth: Vienna, Austria
- Height: 1.83 m (6 ft 0 in)
- Position: Forward

Team information
- Current team: SGV Heilbronn-Freiberg
- Number: 99

Youth career
- –2016: Nußdorfer AC
- 2016–2017: Red Star Penzing
- 2018: Red Bull Salzburg
- 2018–2020: Mainz 05

Senior career*
Years	Team	Apps	(Gls)
2020–2023	Mainz 05 II	30	(8)
2021–2023	Mainz 05	6	(0)
2021–2022	→ Admira Wacker (loan)	27	(6)
2023–2026	Como	7	(0)
2024	→ Fortuna Düsseldorf (loan)	10	(2)
2024–2025	→ Greuther Fürth (loan)	10	(0)
2025–2026	→ Rheindorf Altach (loan)	35	(2)
2026–	SGV Heilbronn-Freiberg	7	(0)

International career^{‡}
2018–2019	Austria U18	6	(1)
2019	Austria U19	5	(3)
2021	Austria U21	2	(0)
- * Club domestic league appearances and goals as of 24 September 2026 ‡ National team caps and goals as of 13:27, 25 July 2024 (UTC)

Suliman-Marlon Mustapha (born 24 May 2001) is an Austrian professional footballer who plays as a forward for German Regionalliga Südwest club SGV Heilbronn-Freiberg.

== Career ==
In 2021, Mustapha was sent on loan to Austrian side Admira Wacker from Bundesliga club Mainz 05. On 24 July 2021, he debuted for Admira during a 1–1 draw with WSG Tirol.

In January 2024, Mustapha joined Fortuna Düsseldorf on loan for the remainder of the season with the club holding an option to purchase.

In July 2024, Mustapha joined Greuther Fürth on a season-long loan deal with the option to buy.

On 5 February 2025 he joined Rheindorf Altach on loan with the option to buy.
