= 2018–19 Bundesliga =

56th season of the Bundesliga

Bundesliga
- Season: 2018–19
- Dates: 24 August 2018 – 18 May 2019
- Champions: Bayern Munich; 28th Bundesliga title 29th German title
- Relegated: VfB Stuttgart (via play-off); Hannover 96; 1. FC Nürnberg
- Champions League: Bayern Munich; Borussia Dortmund; RB Leipzig; Bayer Leverkusen
- Europa League: Borussia Mönchengladbach; VfL Wolfsburg; Eintracht Frankfurt
- Matches: 306
- Goals: 973 (3.18 per match)
- Top goalscorer: Robert Lewandowski (22 goals)
- Biggest home win: Dortmund 7–0 Nürnberg; Wolfsburg 8–1 Augsburg
- Biggest away win: Stuttgart 0–4 Dortmund; Bremen 2–6 Leverkusen; Hannover 0–4 Munich; Düsseldorf 0–4 Leipzig; Mainz 1–5 Leverkusen; Gladbach 1–5 Munich; Augsburg 0–4 Hoffenheim; Freiburg 0–4 Dortmund; Nürnberg 0–4 Gladbach
- Highest scoring: Wolfsburg 8–1 Augsburg
- Longest winning run: 7 games Bayern Munich
- Longest unbeaten run: 15 games Borussia Dortmund
- Longest winless run: 20 games 1. FC Nürnberg
- Longest losing run: 6 games Fortuna Düsseldorf
- Highest attendance: 81,365; Dortmund v Augsburg; Dortmund v Munich; Dortmund v Freiburg; Dortmund v Bremen; Dortmund v Gladbach; Dortmund v Hannover
- Lowest attendance: 19,205; Mainz v Wolfsburg
- Attendance: 13,292,989 (43,441 per match)

The 2018–19 Bundesliga was the 56th season of the Bundesliga, Germany's premier football competition. It began on 24 August 2018 and concluded on 18 May 2019. It also marked the first season without Hamburger SV, previously the only team to have played in the top tier of German football in every season since the end of World War I.

Following a trial phase in the previous season, the video assistant referee system was officially approved for use in the Bundesliga after being added to the Laws of the Game by IFAB.

Bayern Munich were the defending champions, and won their 28th Bundesliga title (and 29th German title) and seventh consecutive Bundesliga on the final matchday.

== Teams ==
Locations of the 2018–19 Bundesliga teams

A total of 18 teams participated in the 2018–19 edition of the Bundesliga.

=== Team changes ===
Promoted from 2017–18 2. Bundesliga	Relegated from 2017–18 Bundesliga
Fortuna Düsseldorf; 1. FC Nürnberg	1. FC Köln; Hamburger SV

=== Stadiums and locations ===
Team	Location	Stadium	Capacity	Ref.
FC Augsburg	Augsburg	WWK Arena	30,660	
Hertha BSC	Berlin	Olympiastadion	74,649	
Werder Bremen	Bremen	Weser-Stadion	42,100	
Borussia Dortmund	Dortmund	Signal Iduna Park	81,365	
Fortuna Düsseldorf	Düsseldorf	Merkur Spiel-Arena	54,600	
Eintracht Frankfurt	Frankfurt	Commerzbank-Arena	51,500	
SC Freiburg	Freiburg im Breisgau	Schwarzwald-Stadion	24,000	
Hannover 96	Hanover	HDI-Arena	49,000	
1899 Hoffenheim	Sinsheim	PreZero Arena	30,150	
RB Leipzig	Leipzig	Red Bull Arena	42,558	
Bayer Leverkusen	Leverkusen	BayArena	30,210	
Mainz 05	Mainz	Opel Arena	34,000	
Borussia Mönchengladbach	Mönchengladbach	Borussia-Park	54,022	
Bayern Munich	Munich	Allianz Arena	75,024	
1. FC Nürnberg	Nuremberg	Max-Morlock-Stadion	49,923	
Schalke 04	Gelsenkirchen	Veltins-Arena	62,271	
VfB Stuttgart	Stuttgart	Mercedes-Benz Arena	60,449	
VfL Wolfsburg	Wolfsburg	Volkswagen Arena	30,000	

=== Personnel and kits ===
Team	Manager	Captain	Kit manufacturer	Shirt sponsor	
Team	Manager	Captain	Kit manufacturer	Front	Sleeve
FC Augsburg	(Switzerland) Martin Schmidt	(Germany) Daniel Baier	Nike	WWK	Siegmund
Hertha BSC	(Hungary) Pál Dárdai	(Bosnia and Herzegovina) Vedad Ibišević	Nike	TEDi	Hyundai Motor Company
Werder Bremen	(Germany) Florian Kohfeldt	(Germany) Max Kruse	Umbro	Wiesenhof	H-Hotels
Borussia Dortmund	(Switzerland) Lucien Favre	(Germany) Marco Reus	Puma	Evonik	Opel
Fortuna Düsseldorf	(Germany) Friedhelm Funkel	(Germany) Oliver Fink	Uhlsport	Henkel	Toyo Tires
Eintracht Frankfurt	(Austria) Adi Hütter	(Argentina) David Abraham	Nike	Indeed.com	Deutsche Börse Group
SC Freiburg	(Germany) Christian Streich	(Germany) Mike Frantz	Hummel	Schwarzwaldmilch	Badenova
Hannover 96	(Germany) Thomas Doll	(Germany) Marvin Bakalorz	Jako	Heinz von Heiden	HDI
1899 Hoffenheim	(Germany) Julian Nagelsmann	(Germany) Kevin Vogt	Lotto	SAP	Prowin
RB Leipzig	(Germany) Ralf Rangnick	(Hungary) Willi Orban	Nike	Red Bull	CG Immobilien
Bayer Leverkusen	(Netherlands) Peter Bosz	(Germany) Lars Bender	Jako	Barmenia Versicherungen	Kieser Training
Mainz 05	(Germany) Sandro Schwarz	(Germany) Stefan Bell	Lotto	Kömmerling	None
Borussia Mönchengladbach	(Germany) Dieter Hecking	(Germany) Lars Stindl	Puma	Postbank	H-Hotels
Bayern Munich	(Croatia) Niko Kovač	(Germany) Manuel Neuer	Adidas	Deutsche Telekom	Qatar Airways
1. FC Nürnberg	(Germany) Boris Schommers	(Germany) Hanno Behrens	Umbro	Nürnberger Versicherung	Godelmann Betonstein
Schalke 04	(Netherlands) Huub Stevens	(Germany) Ralf Fährmann	Umbro	Gazprom	DHL Express
VfB Stuttgart	(Germany) Nico Willig	(Germany) Christian Gentner	Puma	Mercedes-Benz Bank	GAZİ
VfL Wolfsburg	(Germany) Bruno Labbadia	(France) Josuha Guilavogui	Nike	Volkswagen	UPS

=== Managerial changes ===
Team	Outgoing	Manner	Exit date		Position in table	Incoming	Incoming date		Ref.
Team	Outgoing	Manner	Announced on	Departed on	Position in table	Incoming	Announced on	Arrived on	Ref.
Bayern Munich	(Germany) Jupp Heynckes	End of contract	13 April 2018	30 June 2018	Pre-season	(Croatia) Niko Kovač	13 April 2018	1 July 2018	
Eintracht Frankfurt	(Croatia) Niko Kovač	Signed for Bayern Munich	13 April 2018	30 June 2018	Pre-season	(Austria) Adi Hütter	16 May 2018	1 July 2018	
Borussia Dortmund	(Austria) Peter Stöger	End of contract	12 May 2018	30 June 2018	Pre-season	(Switzerland) Lucien Favre	22 May 2018	1 July 2018	
RB Leipzig	(Austria) Ralph Hasenhüttl	Resigned	16 May 2018	30 June 2018	Pre-season	(Germany) Ralf Rangnick	9 July 2018		
VfB Stuttgart	(Turkey) Tayfun Korkut	Sacked	7 October 2018		18th	(Germany) Markus Weinzierl	9 October 2018		
Bayer Leverkusen	(Germany) Heiko Herrlich	Sacked	23 December 2018		9th	(Netherlands) Peter Bosz	23 December 2018		
Hannover 96	(Germany) André Breitenreiter	Sacked	27 January 2019		17th	(Germany) Thomas Doll	27 January 2019		
1. FC Nürnberg	(Germany) Michael Köllner	Sacked	12 February 2019		18th	(Germany) Boris Schommers (interim)	12 February 2019		
Schalke 04	(Germany) Domenico Tedesco	Sacked	14 March 2019		14th	(Netherlands) Huub Stevens (interim)	14 March 2019		
FC Augsburg	(Germany) Manuel Baum	Sacked	9 April 2019		15th	(Switzerland) Martin Schmidt	9 April 2019		
VfB Stuttgart	(Germany) Markus Weinzierl	Sacked	20 April 2019		16th	(Germany) Nico Willig (interim)	20 April 2019		

== League table ==
Pos	Team	Pld	W	D	L	GF	GA	GD	Pts	Qualification or relegation
1	Bayern Munich (C)	34	24	6	4	88	32	+56	78	Qualification for the Champions League group stage
2	Borussia Dortmund	34	23	7	4	81	44	+37	76	Qualification for the Champions League group stage
3	RB Leipzig	34	19	9	6	63	29	+34	66	Qualification for the Champions League group stage
4	Bayer Leverkusen	34	18	4	12	69	52	+17	58	Qualification for the Champions League group stage
5	Borussia Mönchengladbach	34	16	7	11	55	42	+13	55	Qualification for the Europa League group stage (Note: Since the winners of the 2018–19 DFB-Pokal, Bayern Munich, qualified for the Champions League based on league position, the Europa League group stage spot was passed to the sixth-placed team, and the Europa League second qualifying round spot was passed to the seventh-placed team.)
6	VfL Wolfsburg	34	16	7	11	62	50	+12	55	Qualification for the Europa League group stage
7	Eintracht Frankfurt	34	15	9	10	60	48	+12	54	Qualification for the Europa League second qualifying round
8	Werder Bremen	34	14	11	9	58	49	+9	53	
9	1899 Hoffenheim	34	13	12	9	70	52	+18	51	
10	Fortuna Düsseldorf	34	13	5	16	49	65	−16	44	
11	Hertha BSC	34	11	10	13	49	57	−8	43	
12	Mainz 05	34	12	7	15	46	57	−11	43	
13	SC Freiburg	34	8	12	14	46	61	−15	36	
14	Schalke 04	34	8	9	17	37	55	−18	33	
15	FC Augsburg	34	8	8	18	51	71	−20	32	
16	VfB Stuttgart (R)	34	7	7	20	32	70	−38	28	Qualification for the relegation play-offs
17	Hannover 96 (R)	34	5	6	23	31	71	−40	21	Relegation to 2. Bundesliga
18	1. FC Nürnberg (R)	34	3	10	21	26	68	−42	19	Relegation to 2. Bundesliga

Source: DFB
Rules for classification: 1) Points; 2) Goal difference; 3) Goals scored; 4) Head-to-head results; 5) Head-to-head away goals scored; 6) Away goals scored; 7) Play-off
(C) Champions; (R) Relegated

== Results ==
Home \ Away	AUG	BSC	BRE	DOR	DÜS	FRA	FRE	HAN	HOF	LEI	LEV	MAI	MÖN	MUN	NÜR	SCH	STU	WOL
FC Augsburg	—	3–4	2–3	2–1	1–2	1–3	4–1	3–1	0–4	0–0	1–4	3–0	1–1	2–3	2–2	1–1	6–0	2–3
Hertha BSC	2–2	—	1–1	2–3	1–2	1–0	1–1	0–0	3–3	0–3	1–5	2–1	4–2	2–0	1–0	2–2	3–1	0–1
Werder Bremen	4–0	3–1	—	2–2	3–1	2–2	2–1	1–1	1–1	2–1	2–6	3–1	1–3	1–2	1–1	4–2	1–1	2–0
Borussia Dortmund	4–3	2–2	2–1	—	3–2	3–1	2–0	5–1	3–3	4–1	3–2	2–1	2–1	3–2	7–0	2–4	3–1	2–0
Fortuna Düsseldorf	1–2	4–1	4–1	2–1	—	0–3	2–0	2–1	2–1	0–4	1–2	0–1	3–1	1–4	2–1	0–2	3–0	0–3
Eintracht Frankfurt	1–3	0–0	1–2	1–1	7–1	—	3–1	4–1	3–2	1–1	2–1	0–2	1–1	0–3	1–0	3–0	3–0	1–2
SC Freiburg	5–1	2–1	1–1	0–4	1–1	0–2	—	1–1	2–4	3–0	0–0	1–3	3–1	1–1	5–1	1–0	3–3	3–3
Hannover 96	1–2	0–2	0–1	0–0	0–1	0–3	3–0	—	1–3	0–3	2–3	1–0	0–1	0–4	2–0	0–1	3–1	2–1
1899 Hoffenheim	2–1	2–0	0–1	1–1	1–1	1–2	3–1	3–0	—	1–2	4–1	1–1	0–0	1–3	2–1	1–1	4–0	1–4
RB Leipzig	0–0	5–0	3–2	0–1	1–1	0–0	2–1	3–2	1–1	—	3–0	4–1	2–0	0–0	6–0	0–0	2–0	2–0
Bayer Leverkusen	1–0	3–1	1–3	2–4	2–0	6–1	2–0	2–2	1–4	2–4	—	1–0	0–1	3–1	2–0	1–1	2–0	1–3
Mainz 05	2–1	0–0	2–1	1–2	3–1	2–2	5–0	1–1	4–2	3–3	1–5	—	0–1	1–2	2–1	3–0	1–0	0–0
Borussia Mönchengladbach	2–0	0–3	1–1	0–2	3–0	3–1	1–1	4–1	2–2	1–2	2–0	4–0	—	1–5	2–0	2–1	3–0	0–3
Bayern Munich	1–1	1–0	1–0	5–0	3–3	5–1	1–1	3–1	3–1	1–0	3–1	6–0	0–3	—	3–0	3–1	4–1	6–0
1. FC Nürnberg	3–0	1–3	1–1	0–0	3–0	1–1	0–1	2–0	1–3	0–1	1–1	1–1	0–4	1–1	—	1–1	0–2	0–2
Schalke 04	0–0	0–2	0–2	1–2	0–4	1–2	0–0	3–1	2–5	0–1	1–2	1–0	0–2	0–2	5–2	—	0–0	2–1
VfB Stuttgart	1–0	2–1	2–1	0–4	0–0	0–3	2–2	5–1	1–1	1–3	0–1	2–3	1–0	0–3	1–1	1–3	—	3–0
VfL Wolfsburg	8–1	2–2	1–1	0–1	5–2	1–1	1–3	3–1	2–2	1–0	0–3	3–0	2–2	1–3	2–0	2–1	2–0	—

Source: DFB
Legend: Blue = home team win; Yellow = draw; Red = away team win.

== Relegation play-offs ==
All times are CEST (UTC+2).

=== First leg ===
23 May 2019
20:30

VfB Stuttgart	2–2	Union Berlin
Gentner 41'; Gómez 51'	Report	Abdullahi 43'; Friedrich 68'

Mercedes-Benz Arena, Stuttgart
Attendance: 58,619
Referee: Bastian Dankert

=== Second leg ===
27 May 2019
20:30

Union Berlin	0–0	VfB Stuttgart
	Report

Stadion An der Alten Försterei, Berlin
Attendance: 22,012
Referee: Christian Dingert

2–2 on aggregate. Union Berlin won on away goals and were promoted to the Bundesliga, while VfB Stuttgart were relegated to the 2. Bundesliga.

== Statistics ==
=== Top scorers ===
Rank	Player	Club	Goals
1	(Poland) Robert Lewandowski	Bayern Munich	22
2	(Spain) Paco Alcácer	Borussia Dortmund	18
3	(Germany) Kai Havertz	Bayer Leverkusen	17
3	(Serbia) Luka Jović	Eintracht Frankfurt	17
3	(Croatia) Andrej Kramarić	1899 Hoffenheim	17
3	(Germany) Marco Reus	Borussia Dortmund	17
3	(Netherlands) Wout Weghorst	VfL Wolfsburg	17
8	(Algeria) Ishak Belfodil	1899 Hoffenheim	16
8	(Germany) Timo Werner	RB Leipzig	16
10	(France) Sébastien Haller	Eintracht Frankfurt	15
10	(Denmark) Yussuf Poulsen	RB Leipzig	15

=== Hat-tricks ===
Player	Club	Against	Result	Date
(Iceland) Alfreð Finnbogason	FC Augsburg	SC Freiburg	4–1	30 September 2018
(Spain) Paco Alcácer	Borussia Dortmund	FC Augsburg	4–3	6 October 2018
(Serbia) Luka Jović^{5}	Eintracht Frankfurt	Fortuna Düsseldorf	7–1	19 October 2018
(Germany) Jonas Hofmann	Borussia Mönchengladbach	Mainz 05	4–0	21 October 2018
(France) Alassane Pléa	Borussia Mönchengladbach	Werder Bremen	3–1	10 November 2018
(Belgium) Dodi Lukebakio	Fortuna Düsseldorf	Bayern Munich	3–3	24 November 2018
(Iceland) Alfreð Finnbogason	FC Augsburg	Mainz 05	3–0	3 February 2019
(Netherlands) Wout Weghorst	VfL Wolfsburg	Fortuna Düsseldorf	5–2	16 March 2019
(Colombia) James Rodríguez	Bayern Munich	Mainz 05	6–0	17 March 2019
(Denmark) Yussuf Poulsen	RB Leipzig	Hertha BSC	5–0	30 March 2019
(France) Jean-Philippe Mateta	Mainz 05	SC Freiburg	5–0	5 April 2019
(Algeria) Ishak Belfodil	1899 Hoffenheim	FC Augsburg	4–0	7 April 2019
(Argentina) Lucas Alario	Bayer Leverkusen	Hertha BSC	5–1	18 May 2019
(Netherlands) Wout Weghorst	VfL Wolfsburg	FC Augsburg	8–1	18 May 2019

^{5} Player scored five goals

=== Clean sheets ===
Rank	Player	Club	Clean sheets
1	(Hungary) Péter Gulácsi	RB Leipzig	16
2	(Switzerland) Yann Sommer	Borussia Mönchengladbach	13
3	(Switzerland) Roman Bürki	Borussia Dortmund	10
3	(Germany) Manuel Neuer	Bayern Munich	10
5	(Finland) Lukáš Hrádecký	Bayer Leverkusen	9
6	(Belgium) Koen Casteels	VfL Wolfsburg	8
6	(Norway) Rune Jarstein	Hertha BSC	8
6	(Germany) Kevin Trapp	Eintracht Frankfurt	8
9	(Germany) Ron-Robert Zieler	VfB Stuttgart	6
10	(Germany) Oliver Baumann	TSG 1899 Hoffenheim	5
10	(Germany) Michael Esser	Hannover 96	5
10	(Germany) Florian Müller	Mainz 05	5
10	(Czech Republic) Jiří Pavlenka	Werder Bremen	5
10	(Germany) Michael Rensing	Fortuna Düsseldorf	5
10	(Germany) Alexander Schwolow	SC Freiburg	5

== Awards ==
=== Monthly awards ===
Month	Player of the Month		Rookie of the Month		Goal of the Month		Ref.
Month	Player	Club	Player	Club	Player	Club	Ref.
August	—N/a		—N/a		(Belgium) Axel Witsel	Borussia Dortmund	
September	(Germany) Marco Reus	Borussia Dortmund	(Morocco) Achraf Hakimi	Borussia Dortmund	(Denmark) Jacob Bruun Larsen	Borussia Dortmund	
October	(England) Jadon Sancho	Borussia Dortmund	(England) Reiss Nelson	1899 Hoffenheim	(Spain) Paco Alcácer	Borussia Dortmund	
November	(Germany) Marco Reus	Borussia Dortmund	(Morocco) Achraf Hakimi	Borussia Dortmund	(Germany) Marco Reus	Borussia Dortmund	
December	(Germany) Marco Reus	Borussia Dortmund	(Belgium) Dodi Lukebakio	Fortuna Düsseldorf	(Germany) Jean Zimmer	Fortuna Düsseldorf	
January	(Germany) Leon Goretzka	Bayern Munich	(Argentina) Nicolás González	VfB Stuttgart	(Germany) Maximilian Eggestein	Werder Bremen	
February	(Germany) Julian Brandt	Bayer Leverkusen	(France) Evan Ndicka	Eintracht Frankfurt	(England) Jadon Sancho	Borussia Dortmund	
March	(Germany) Max Kruse	Werder Bremen	(Turkey) Ozan Kabak	VfB Stuttgart	(Poland) Robert Lewandowski	Bayern Munich	
April	(Germany) Kai Havertz	Bayer Leverkusen	(Brazil) Matheus Pereira	1. FC Nürnberg	(Brazil) Matheus Cunha	RB Leipzig	
May	(Germany) Kai Havertz	Bayer Leverkusen	—N/a		(France) Franck Ribéry	Bayern Munich	

=== Annual Awards ===
Award	Winner	Club / Details
Rookie of the Season	(Turkey) Ozan Kabak	VfB Stuttgart
Goal of the Season	(France) Franck Ribéry	Bayern Munich
Save of the Season	(Switzerland) Roman Bürki	Borussia Dortmund
VDV Player of the Season	(Germany) Marco Reus	Borussia Dortmund

Team of the Season
Goalkeeper	(Germany) Kevin Trapp (Eintracht Frankfurt)			
Defenders	(Germany) Danny da Costa (Eintracht Frankfurt)		(Germany) Marcel Halstenberg (RB Leipzig)	(Germany) Joshua Kimmich (Bayern Munich)
Midfielders	(Serbia) Filip Kostić (Eintracht Frankfurt)	(Germany) Marco Reus (Borussia Dortmund)	(Germany) Kai Havertz (Bayer Leverkusen)	(England) Jadon Sancho (Borussia Dortmund)
Forwards	(Serbia) Luka Jović (Eintracht Frankfurt)		(Poland) Robert Lewandowski (Bayern Munich)	(Germany) Julian Brandt (Bayer Leverkusen)

== Attendances ==
Rank	Team	Home games	Average attendance
1	Borussia Dortmund	17	80,841
2	Bayern München	17	75,000
3	Schalke 04	17	60,941
4	VfB Stuttgart	17	54,551
5	Eintracht Frankfurt	17	49,765
6	Borussia Mönchengladbach	17	49,668
7	Hertha BSC	17	49,259
8	Fortuna 95	17	43,857
9	Werder Bremen	17	41,256
10	1. FC Nürnberg	17	40,372
11	RB Leipzig	17	38,380
12	Hannover 96	17	38,365
13	FC Augsburg	17	28,618
14	TSG Hoffenheim	17	28,456
15	Bayer Leverkusen	17	27,990
16	Mainz 05	17	26,246
17	VfL Wolfsburg	17	24,481
18	SC Freiburg	17	23,894
