= 2019–20 2. Bundesliga =

46th season of the second-tier football league in Germany

2. Bundesliga
- Season: 2019–20
- Dates: 26 July 2019 – 28 June 2020
- Champions: Arminia Bielefeld
- Promoted: Arminia Bielefeld; VfB Stuttgart
- Relegated: Wehen Wiesbaden; Dynamo Dresden
- Matches: 306
- Goals: 881 (2.88 per match)
- Top goalscorer: Fabian Klos (21 goals)
- Biggest home win: Bielefeld 6–0 Regensburg
- Biggest away win: Wiesbaden 0–6 Nürnberg; Nürnberg 0–6 Stuttgart
- Highest scoring: Wiesbaden 3–6 Kiel
- Longest winning run: 4 games Hamburg; Darmstadt; Bielefeld; Stuttgart
- Longest unbeaten run: 16 games Bielefeld
- Longest winless run: 10 games Osnabrück
- Longest losing run: 5 games Karlsruhe; Dresden
- Highest attendance: 53,315; Stuttgart v St. Pauli
- Lowest attendance: 5,025 (Note: Attendances before the change to spectatorless matches. All 81 matches played after 9 March 2020 have been, or are scheduled to be, played behind closed doors without any spectators.); Sandhausen v Osnabrück
- Attendance: 4,582,378 (14,975 per match) (Note: The average league attendance was 20,370 after 225 matches prior to fixtures being played behind closed doors.)

The 2019–20 2. Bundesliga was the 46th season of the 2. Bundesliga. It began on 26 July 2019 and was initially due to conclude on 17 May 2020.

Arminia Bielefeld secured their promotion on 16 June 2020, while VfB Stuttgart were promoted on the last matchday.

Following an offline test phase in the previous season, the video assistant referee system will be used for the first time in the 2. Bundesliga. Also, the number of substitutes allowed on the bench was increased from seven to nine for the 2019–20 season.

On 13 March 2020, the DFL suspended the Bundesliga and 2. Bundesliga due to the COVID-19 pandemic in Germany. After consultation with the German government, the league resumed behind closed doors on 16 May 2020. The season then concluded on 28 June.

== Season ==
=== Fight for promotion ===
Arminia Bielefeld was on the way to the top of the table as of the 6th match day. Shortly before the end of the round, they managed to achieve 1st position, and stayed there. Only a few days before the direct promotion and then the 2. Bundesliga championship were determined. Last year's relegation team VfB Stuttgart and Hamburger SV competed for second place, but both of them were never able to start longer winning streaks and fell further and further behind Arminia Bielefeld. A game day before the end of the season, no decision had been made as to which team would also advance. With the 2–1 victory against Hamburger SV, last year's fifth-placed 1. FC Heidenheim finally moved to the relegation place, while VfB Stuttgart was able to consolidate second place with a 6–0 in 1. 1. FC Nürnberg and Hamburger SV therefore only had a chance to finish third. In addition, only VfB Stuttgart had fired its head coach from the top four during the season. On the final day of the match 1. FC Heidenheim lost to champion Arminia Bielefeld, but Hamburger SV did not take advantage of this opportunity and got an unexpected 1-5 loss to SV Sandhausen. Therefore, 1. FC Heidenheim held onto third place and competed against SV Werder Bremen in the relegation. After a 0–0 in SV Werder Bremen and a 2–2 in the home game, 1. FC Heidenheim missed the promotion due to the away goals rule.

=== Fight for relegations ===
The newly promoted SV Wehen Wiesbaden was already in the relegation fight as of the 2 match day and could never get beyond the relegation place with the exception of the 20 match day. Nevertheless, the rescue was still possible until shortly before the end of the season, as was the case with the co-leader Karlsruher SC. In addition to the two, FC St. Pauli, VfL Osnabrück and 1. FC Nürnberg were also relegated to the 3. Liga; FC St. Pauli and VfL Osnabrück finally saved themselves. On the final day of the match, this meant a four-way match between 1. FC Nürnberg, Karlsruher SC and SV Wehen Wiesbaden as well as Dynamo Dresden, which had occupied the last place the longest and, after 33 games played, could only push themselves to the relegation rank. Dynamo Dresden played only draws against VfL Osnabrück and was therefore relegated as the last in the table. SV Wehen Wiesbaden played 5–3 against FC St. Pauli, but also had to be relegated as Karlsruher SC won and was able to save themselves in 15th place. 1. FC Nürnberg also won only one point and would have depended on a home victory of the Frankish rival SpVgg Greuther Fürth against Karlsruher SC, so as not to have to play for the class maintenance. Therefore, the "Club" was ranked 16th at the end of the season and had to contest the relegation against the previous year's relegation club FC Ingolstadt 04. After a 2–0 win in the first leg, the 1. FC Nürnberg players lost 1–3 in the return match, but remained in the 2. Bundesliga due to the away goals rule.

== Useful Information ==
- At the start of the season, the Video assistant referee was introduced as additional support for referees during the game. The Video assistant referee was tested "offline" in the pre-season, and for this season a direct link was established between the main referee on the field and a video assistant. Not all contentious scenes are evaluated by the video assistant, only those involving possible goals, red cards (but not yellow-red cards), penalties or player confusion. After two years of service in the Bundesliga, the video evidence was introduced in the 2. Bundesliga.
- Arminia Bielefeld tied with the previous record holder 1. FC Nürnberg through the 8th Bundesliga promotion and became record champion of the 2. Bundesliga (together with SC Freiburg, 1. FC Köln and 1. FC Nürnberg).
- Arminia Bielefeld suffered only two defeats in the season; this is the lowest number of all teams in the history of the 2. Bundesliga (together with their own performance in the 1979–80 2. Bundesliga in the 2. Bundesliga North and that of Hertha BSC in the 2012–13 2. Bundesliga).

== Effects of the COVID-19 pandemic ==
Due to the COVID-19 pandemic in Germany, on 8 March 2020 the Federal Minister of Health, Jens Spahn recommended cancelling events with more than 1,000 people. The following day, the DFL announced that the 2. Bundesliga season would be completed to ensure planning for the following season, and that any postponements would be to matchdays en bloc. In the following days, Timo Hübers, Jannes Horn (both of Hannover 96), Fabian Nürnberger (1. FC Nürnberg) and Stefan Thesker (Holstein Kiel) tested positive for COVID-19, requiring all first team players of the three clubs to self-quarantine. Fixtures on matchday 26 (13–15 March) were planned to be played without spectators, when necessary, due to local restrictions on public gatherings, but the round was subsequently postponed on 13 March due to safety issues. On 16 March, the DFL general assembly suspended the league until at least 2 April, and scheduled another meeting for the final week of March to discuss how the competition should proceed. The DFL Executive Committee later recommended that the General Assembly, at their meeting on 31 March, extend the suspension until at least 30 April, which was confirmed after that meeting.

The DFL are looking into possible scenarios to finish the season regularly. However, several virologists raised doubts, stating that any professional football matches in Germany, including those behind closed doors, were unrealistic for at least the next 12 months.

On 3 April 2020, the DFL reported that the financial situation of most teams was more serious than thought. 13 of the 36 professional football clubs from the Bundesliga and 2. Bundesliga, including nine clubs from the 2. Bundesliga, would have to declare bankruptcy by May or June unless league operations resumed by then. Twelve of those clubs had already used the outstanding license fees (which are dependent on the season to be continued) to pay their March debts to creditors. At their 31 March meeting, the DFL had decided that clubs that enter insolvency proceedings this season would not suffer the usual deduction of points, and clubs that enter proceedings next season only lose three instead of the usual nine points. After allowing teams to return to training in a limited fashion, the league returned on 16 May to play following approval from local authorities. On 9 May 2020, two players of Dynamo Dresden tested positive for COVID-19, requiring a 14-day quarantine for the entire first team and training staff, therefore preventing their match scheduled on 17 May against Hannover 96 from taking place. On 14 May, after a meeting of all clubs, five substitutions will be permitted, which has been temporarily allowed by IFAB following a proposal by FIFA to lessen the impact of fixture congestion. The broadcaster Sky Sport announced that for the first two weeks after the restart, the Bundesliga and 2. Bundesliga simulcast ("conference") will be shown on free-to-air television in Germany, in order to prevent gatherings of people without pay TV subscriptions.

== Teams ==
Locations of the 2019–20 2. Bundesliga teams

=== Team changes ===
| Promoted from 2018–19 3. Liga | Relegated from 2018–19 Bundesliga | Promoted to 2019–20 Bundesliga | Relegated to 2019–20 3. Liga |
|---|---|---|---|
| VfL Osnabrück; Karlsruher SC; Wehen Wiesbaden | VfB Stuttgart; Hannover 96; 1. FC Nürnberg | 1. FC Köln; SC Paderborn; Union Berlin | FC Ingolstadt; 1. FC Magdeburg; MSV Duisburg |

=== Stadiums and locations ===
| Team | Location | Stadium | Capacity | Spectators | per Game | Utilization | Sold out | Seasontickets |
|---|---|---|---|---|---|---|---|---|
| Erzgebirge Aue | Aue-Bad Schlema | Erzgebirgsstadion | 15,711 | 139,700 | 8,218 | 49,80% | 2/17** | 2,300 |
| Arminia Bielefeld | Bielefeld | Schüco-Arena | 27,300 | 254,285 | 14,958 | 56,40% | 1/17** | 8,500 |
| VfL Bochum | Bochum | Vonovia Ruhrstadion | 29,299 | 225,147 | 13,244 | 48,00% | 0/17* | 6,900 |
| Darmstadt 98 | Darmstadt | Merck-Stadion am Böllenfalltor | 17,000 | 185,724 | 10,925 | 61,00% | 3/17* | 11,000 |
| Dynamo Dresden | Dresden | Rudolf-Harbig-Stadion | 32,066 | 354,016 | 20,824 | 64,90% | 1/17* | 18,000 |
| Greuther Fürth | Fürth | Sportpark Ronhof Thomas Sommer | 18,500 | 120,645 | 7,097 | 42,70% | 1/17** | 4,850 |
| Hamburger SV | Hamburg | Volksparkstadion | 57,000 | 567.804 | 33.400 | 58,60% | 2/17** | 23,800 |
| Hannover 96 | Hanover | HDI-Arena | 49,000 | 359,600 | 21,153 | 43,20% | 1/17* | 19,000 |
| 1. FC Heidenheim | Heidenheim | Voith-Arena | 15,000 | 153,850 | 9,050 | 60,30% | 1/17* | 6,500 |
| Karlsruher SC | Karlsruhe | Wildparkstadion | 29,699 | 156,801 | 9,224 | 60,02% | 1/17** | 6,500 |
| Holstein Kiel | Kiel | Holstein-Stadion | 15,034 | 136,888 | 8,052 | 53,60% | 2/17** | 7,000 |
| 1. FC Nürnberg | Nuremberg | Max-Morlock-Stadion | 49,923 | 50,000 | 22,649 | 45,03% | 0/17* | 21,000 |
| VfL Osnabrück | Osnabrück | Stadion an der Bremer Brücke | 16,667 | 191,246 | 11,250 | 69,90% | 4/17* | 7,550 |
| Jahn Regensburg | Regensburg | Arena Regensburg | 15,224 | 137,055 | 8,062 | 53,00% | 2/17** | 4,700 |
| SV Sandhausen | Sandhausen | BWT-Stadion am Hardtwald | 15,414 | 96.935 | 5,702 | 37,00% | 0/17* | 2,750 |
| FC St. Pauli | Hamburg | Millerntor-Stadion | 29,546 | 382,743 | 22,514 | 76,20% | 10/17* | 15,000 |
| VfB Stuttgart | Stuttgart | Mercedes-Benz Arena | 60,449 | 671.546 | 39.503 | 65,30% | 1/17* | 30,000 |
| Wehen Wiesbaden | Wiesbaden | BRITA-Arena | 9,100 | 63,360 | 3,727 | 41,00% | 1/17** | 1,700 |
| Total | | | 484,014 | 4,528,076 | 14,798 | 54,99% | 33/306 | 197,050 |

=== Personnel and kits ===
| Team | Manager | Captain | Kit manufacturer | Shirt sponsor | |
| Team | Manager | Captain | Kit manufacturer | Front | Sleeve |
|---|---|---|---|---|---|
| Erzgebirge Aue | (Germany) Dirk Schuster | (Germany) Martin Männel | Nike | WätaS Wärmetauscher Sachsen | Leonhardt Group |
| Arminia Bielefeld | (Germany) Uwe Neuhaus | (Germany) Fabian Klos | Joma | Schüco | JAB Anstoetz Textilien |
| VfL Bochum | (Germany) Thomas Reis | (France) Anthony Losilla | Nike | Tricorp Workwear | Viactiv Betriebskrankenkasse |
| Darmstadt 98 | (Greece) Dimitrios Grammozis | (Germany) Fabian Holland | Craft | Software AG | Jeez |
| Dynamo Dresden | (Germany) Markus Kauczinski | (Germany) Marco Hartmann | Craft | ALL-INKL.COM | AOK Plus |
| Greuther Fürth | (Germany) Stefan Leitl | (Germany) Marco Caligiuri | Hummel | Hofmann Personal | BVUK |
| Hamburger SV | (Germany) Dieter Hecking | (Germany) Aaron Hunt | Adidas | Emirates | Popp Feinkost |
| Hannover 96 | (Turkey) Kenan Kocak | (Germany) Marvin Bakalorz | Macron | Heinz von Heiden | HDI |
| 1. FC Heidenheim | (Germany) Frank Schmidt | (Germany) Marc Schnatterer | Nike | Kneipp | Voith |
| Karlsruher SC | (Germany) Christian Eichner | (Germany) David Pisot | Macron | Klaiber Markisen | CG Gruppe |
| Holstein Kiel | (Germany) Ole Werner | (Germany) Hauke Wahl | Puma | Famila | Lotto Schleswig-Holstein |
| 1. FC Nürnberg | (Germany) Michael Wiesinger | (Germany) Hanno Behrens | Umbro | Nürnberger Versicherung | Godelmann Betonstein |
| VfL Osnabrück | (Germany) Daniel Thioune | (United States) Marc Heider | Puma | sunmaker | Sievert |
| Jahn Regensburg | (Bosnia and Herzegovina) Mersad Selimbegović | (Germany) Marco Grüttner | Saller | Netto | Dallmeier electronic |
| SV Sandhausen | (Germany) Uwe Koschinat | (Germany) Dennis Diekmeier | Puma | sunmaker | BWT |
| FC St. Pauli | (Netherlands) Jos Luhukay | (Germany) Christopher Avevor | Under Armour | Congstar | Astra Brauerei |
| VfB Stuttgart | (United States) Pellegrino Matarazzo | (Germany) Marc-Oliver Kempf | Jako | Mercedes-Benz Bank | Mercedes-Benz EQ |
| Wehen Wiesbaden | (Germany) Rüdiger Rehm | (Poland) Sebastian Mrowca | Nike | Brita | SVA |

=== Managerial changes ===
| Team | Outgoing | Manner | Exit date | | Position in table | Incoming | Incoming date | | Ref. |
| Team | Outgoing | Manner | Announced on | Departed on | Position in table | Incoming | Announced on | Arrived on | Ref. |
|---|---|---|---|---|---|---|---|---|---|
| Jahn Regensburg | (Germany) Achim Beierlorzer | Signed by 1. FC Köln | 13 May 2019 | 30 June 2019 | Pre-season | (Bosnia and Herzegovina) Mersad Selimbegović | 31 May 2019 | 1 July 2019 | |
| 1. FC Nürnberg | (Germany) Boris Schommers (interim) | End of caretaker spell | 14 May 2019 | 30 June 2019 | Pre-season | (Austria) Damir Canadi | 19 May 2019 | 1 July 2019 | |
| Hamburger SV | (Germany) Hannes Wolf | Sacked | 17 May 2019 | 30 June 2019 | Pre-season | (Germany) Dieter Hecking | 29 May 2019 | 1 July 2019 | |
| Holstein Kiel | (Germany) Tim Walter | Signed by VfB Stuttgart | 20 May 2019 | 30 June 2019 | Pre-season | (Germany) André Schubert | 16 June 2019 | 1 July 2019 | |
| VfB Stuttgart | (Germany) Nico Willig (interim) | End of caretaker spell | 20 May 2019 | 30 June 2019 | Pre-season | (Germany) Tim Walter | 20 May 2019 | 1 July 2019 | |
| Hannover 96 | (Germany) Thomas Doll | Sacked | 28 May 2019 | 30 June 2019 | Pre-season | (Germany) Mirko Slomka | 28 May 2019 | 1 July 2019 | |
| Erzgebirge Aue | (Germany) Daniel Meyer | Sacked | 19 August 2019 | | 5th | (Germany) Marc Hensel (interim) | 20 August 2019 | | |
| VfL Bochum | (Germany) Robin Dutt | Sacked | 26 August 2019 | | 17th | (Germany) Heiko Butscher (interim) | 26 August 2019 | | |
| Erzgebirge Aue | (Germany) Marc Hensel (interim) | End of caretaker spell | 26 August 2019 | | 5th | (Germany) Dirk Schuster | 26 August 2019 | | |
| VfL Bochum | (Germany) Heiko Butscher (interim) | End of caretaker spell | 6 September 2019 | | 17th | (Germany) Thomas Reis | 6 September 2019 | | |
| Holstein Kiel | (Germany) André Schubert | Sacked | 15 September 2019 | | 15th | (Germany) Ole Werner | 16 September 2019 | | |
| Hannover 96 | (Germany) Mirko Slomka | Sacked | 3 November 2019 | | 13th | (Bosnia and Herzegovina) Asif Šarić (interim) | 4 November 2019 | | |
| 1. FC Nürnberg | (Austria) Damir Canadi | Sacked | 4 November 2019 | | 11th | (Slovakia) Marek Mintál (interim) | 4 November 2019 | | |
| 1. FC Nürnberg | (Slovakia) Marek Mintál (interim) | End of caretaker spell | 12 November 2019 | | 14th | (Germany) Jens Keller | 12 November 2019 | | |
| Hannover 96 | (Bosnia and Herzegovina) Asif Šarić (interim) | End of caretaker spell | 14 November 2019 | | 15th | (Turkey) Kenan Kocak | 14 November 2019 | | |
| Dynamo Dresden | (Germany) Cristian Fiél | Mutual consent | 2 December 2019 | | 18th | (Germany) Heiko Scholz (interim) | 3 December 2019 | | |
| Dynamo Dresden | (Germany) Heiko Scholz (interim) | End of caretaker spell | 10 December 2019 | | 18th | (Germany) Markus Kauczinski | 10 December 2019 | | |
| VfB Stuttgart | (Germany) Tim Walter | Sacked | 23 December 2019 | | 3rd | (United States) Pellegrino Matarazzo | 30 December 2019 | | |
| Karlsruher SC | (Germany) Alois Schwartz | Sacked | 3 February 2020 | | 17th | (Germany) Christian Eichner (Note: Eichner was initially appointed as interim coach until the end of the season. The move was made permanent during 2020–21 pre-season, on 8 July 2020.) | 3 February 2020 | | |
| 1. FC Nürnberg | (Germany) Jens Keller | Sacked | 29 June 2020 | | 16th | (Germany) Michael Wiesinger (interim) | 29 June 2020 | | |

== League table ==
| Pos | Team | Pld | W | D | L | GF | GA | GD | Pts | Promotion, qualification or relegation |
|---|---|---|---|---|---|---|---|---|---|---|
| 1 | Arminia Bielefeld (C, P) | 34 | 18 | 14 | 2 | 65 | 30 | +35 | 68 | Promotion to Bundesliga |
| 2 | VfB Stuttgart (P) | 34 | 17 | 7 | 10 | 62 | 41 | +21 | 58 | Promotion to Bundesliga |
| 3 | 1. FC Heidenheim | 34 | 15 | 10 | 9 | 45 | 36 | +9 | 55 | Qualification for promotion play-offs |
| 4 | Hamburger SV | 34 | 14 | 12 | 8 | 62 | 46 | +16 | 54 | |
| 5 | Darmstadt 98 | 34 | 13 | 13 | 8 | 48 | 43 | +5 | 52 | |
| 6 | Hannover 96 | 34 | 13 | 9 | 12 | 54 | 49 | +5 | 48 | |
| 7 | Erzgebirge Aue | 34 | 13 | 8 | 13 | 46 | 48 | −2 | 47 | |
| 8 | VfL Bochum | 34 | 11 | 13 | 10 | 53 | 51 | +2 | 46 | |
| 9 | Greuther Fürth | 34 | 11 | 11 | 12 | 46 | 45 | +1 | 44 | |
| 10 | SV Sandhausen | 34 | 10 | 13 | 11 | 43 | 45 | −2 | 43 | |
| 11 | Holstein Kiel | 34 | 11 | 10 | 13 | 53 | 56 | −3 | 43 | |
| 12 | Jahn Regensburg | 34 | 11 | 10 | 13 | 50 | 56 | −6 | 43 | |
| 13 | VfL Osnabrück | 34 | 9 | 13 | 12 | 46 | 48 | −2 | 40 | |
| 14 | FC St. Pauli | 34 | 9 | 12 | 13 | 41 | 50 | −9 | 39 | |
| 15 | Karlsruher SC | 34 | 8 | 13 | 13 | 45 | 56 | −11 | 37 | |
| 16 | 1. FC Nürnberg (O) | 34 | 8 | 13 | 13 | 45 | 58 | −13 | 37 | Qualification for relegation play-offs |
| 17 | Wehen Wiesbaden (R) | 34 | 9 | 7 | 18 | 45 | 65 | −20 | 34 | Relegation to 3. Liga |
| 18 | Dynamo Dresden (R) | 34 | 8 | 8 | 18 | 32 | 58 | −26 | 32 | Relegation to 3. Liga |

Source: DFB
Rules for classification: 1) Points; 2) Goal difference; 3) Goals scored; 4) Head-to-head points; 5) Head-to-head goal difference; 6) Head-to-head away goals scored; 7) Away goals scored; 8) Play-off.
(C) Champions; (O) Play-off winners; (P) Promoted; (R) Relegated

== Results ==
| Home \ Away | AUE | BIE | BOC | DAR | DRE | FÜR | HAM | HAN | HEI | KAR | KIE | NÜR | OSN | REG | SAN | STP | STU | WIE |
|---|---|---|---|---|---|---|---|---|---|---|---|---|---|---|---|---|---|---|
| Erzgebirge Aue | — | 0–0 | 1–2 | 1–3 | 4–1 | 3–1 | 3–0 | 2–1 | 1–1 | 1–0 | 1–2 | 4–3 | 1–0 | 1–0 | 3–1 | 3–1 | 0–0 | 3–2 |
| Arminia Bielefeld | 3–1 | — | 2–0 | 1–0 | 4–0 | 2–2 | 1–1 | 1–0 | 3–0 | 2–2 | 2–1 | 1–1 | 1–1 | 6–0 | 1–1 | 1–1 | 0–1 | 1–0 |
| VfL Bochum | 2–0 | 3–3 | — | 2–2 | 2–2 | 2–2 | 1–3 | 2–1 | 3–0 | 3–3 | 2–1 | 3–1 | 1–1 | 2–3 | 4–4 | 2–0 | 0–1 | 3–3 |
| Darmstadt 98 | 1–0 | 1–3 | 0–0 | — | 0–0 | 1–1 | 2–2 | 3–2 | 2–0 | 1–1 | 2–0 | 3–3 | 2–2 | 2–2 | 1–0 | 4–0 | 1–1 | 3–1 |
| Dynamo Dresden | 2–1 | 0–1 | 1–2 | 2–3 | — | 1–1 | 0–1 | 0–2 | 2–1 | 1–0 | 1–2 | 0–1 | 2–2 | 2–1 | 1–1 | 3–3 | 0–2 | 1–0 |
| Greuther Fürth | 0–2 | 2–4 | 3–1 | 3–1 | 2–0 | — | 2–2 | 1–3 | 0–0 | 1–2 | 0–3 | 0–0 | 0–2 | 1–0 | 1–2 | 3–0 | 2–0 | 2–1 |
| Hamburger SV | 4–0 | 0–0 | 1–0 | 1–1 | 2–1 | 2–0 | — | 3–0 | 0–1 | 2–0 | 3–3 | 4–1 | 1–1 | 2–1 | 1–5 | 0–2 | 6–2 | 3–2 |
| Hannover 96 | 3–2 | 0–2 | 2–0 | 1–2 | 3–0 | 1–1 | 1–1 | — | 2–1 | 1–1 | 3–1 | 0–4 | 0–0 | 1–1 | 1–1 | 4–0 | 2–2 | 2–2 |
| 1. FC Heidenheim | 3–0 | 0–0 | 2–3 | 1–0 | 0–0 | 1–0 | 2–1 | 4–0 | — | 3–1 | 3–0 | 2–2 | 3–1 | 4–1 | 0–2 | 1–0 | 2–2 | 1–0 |
| Karlsruher SC | 1–1 | 3–3 | 0–0 | 2–0 | 4–2 | 1–5 | 2–4 | 3–3 | 1–1 | — | 0–2 | 0–1 | 1–1 | 4–1 | 1–0 | 1–1 | 2–1 | 0–1 |
| Holstein Kiel | 1–1 | 1–2 | 2–1 | 1–1 | 2–0 | 1–1 | 1–1 | 1–2 | 0–1 | 2–1 | — | 1–1 | 2–4 | 1–2 | 1–1 | 2–1 | 3–2 | 1–2 |
| 1. FC Nürnberg | 1–1 | 1–5 | 0–0 | 1–2 | 2–0 | 0–1 | 0–4 | 0–3 | 2–2 | 1–1 | 2–2 | — | 1–0 | 1–1 | 2–0 | 1–1 | 0–6 | 0–2 |
| VfL Osnabrück | 0–0 | 0–1 | 0–2 | 4–0 | 3–0 | 0–0 | 2–1 | 2–4 | 1–3 | 3–0 | 4–1 | 0–1 | — | 2–2 | 1–3 | 1–1 | 1–0 | 2–6 |
| Jahn Regensburg | 1–2 | 1–3 | 3–1 | 3–0 | 1–2 | 0–2 | 2–2 | 1–0 | 3–1 | 2–1 | 2–2 | 2–2 | 3–3 | — | 1–0 | 1–0 | 2–3 | 1–0 |
| SV Sandhausen | 2–2 | 0–0 | 1–1 | 1–0 | 0–1 | 3–2 | 1–1 | 3–1 | 0–1 | 0–2 | 2–2 | 3–2 | 0–1 | 0–0 | — | 2–2 | 2–1 | 0–0 |
| FC St. Pauli | 2–1 | 3–0 | 1–1 | 0–1 | 0–0 | 1–3 | 2–0 | 0–1 | 0–0 | 2–2 | 2–1 | 1–0 | 3–1 | 1–1 | 2–0 | — | 1–1 | 3–1 |
| VfB Stuttgart | 3–0 | 1–1 | 2–1 | 1–3 | 3–1 | 2–0 | 3–2 | 2–1 | 3–0 | 3–0 | 0–1 | 3–1 | 0–0 | 2–0 | 5–1 | 2–1 | — | 1–2 |
| Wehen Wiesbaden | 1–0 | 2–5 | 0–1 | 0–0 | 2–3 | 1–1 | 1–1 | 0–3 | 0–0 | 1–2 | 3–6 | 0–6 | 2–0 | 0–5 | 0–1 | 5–3 | 2–1 | — |

Source: DFB
Legend: Blue = home team win; Yellow = draw; Red = away team win.

== Promotion/relegation play-offs ==
All times are CEST (UTC+2).

=== Overview ===
| Team 1 | Agg. | Team 2 | 1st leg | 2nd leg |
|---|---|---|---|---|
| 1. FC Nürnberg (2B) | 3–3 (a) | FC Ingolstadt (3L) | 2–0 | 1–3 |

=== Matches ===
7 July 2020
18:15

| 1. FC Nürnberg | 2–0 | FC Ingolstadt |
|---|---|---|
| Nürnberger 22', 45' | Report |

Max-Morlock-Stadion, Nuremberg
Attendance: 0
Referee: Sascha Stegemann

11 July 2020
18:15

| FC Ingolstadt | 3–1 | 1. FC Nürnberg |
|---|---|---|
| Kutschke 53'; Schröck 62'; Krauße 66' | Report | Schleusener 90+6' |

Audi Sportpark, Ingolstadt
Attendance: 0
Referee: Christian Dingert

3–3 on aggregate. 1. FC Nürnberg won on away goals, and therefore both clubs remained in their respective leagues.

== Statistics ==
=== Top goalscorers ===
| Rank | Player | Club | Goals |
|---|---|---|---|
| 1 | (Germany) Fabian Klos | Arminia Bielefeld | 21 |
| 2 | (Germany) Manuel Schäffler | Wehen Wiesbaden | 19 |
| 3 | (Germany) Philipp Hofmann | Karlsruher SC | 17 |
| 4 | (Turkey) Serdar Dursun | Darmstadt 98 | 16 |
| 5 | (Germany) Marvin Ducksch | Hannover 96 | 15 |
| 6 | (Germany) Kevin Behrens | SV Sandhausen | 14 |
| 6 | (Argentina) Nicolás González | VfB Stuttgart | 14 |
| 6 | (Germany) Tim Kleindienst | 1. FC Heidenheim | 14 |
| 9 | (Germany) Marcos Álvarez | VfL Osnabrück | 13 |
| 9 | (Republic of the Congo) Silvère Ganvoula | VfL Bochum | 13 |

== Highs of the season ==
- The most goal-scoring game with nine goals was the 3:6 of the SV Wehen Wiesbaden against Holstein Kiel on the 14 match day.
- The highest wins were with six goals difference each
  - the 6-0 of Arminia Bielefeld against SSV Jahn Regensburg on the 21 match day.
  - the 6-0 of the 1. FC Nürnberg at SV Wehen Wiesbaden on the 32 match day.
  - the 6-0 of VfB Stuttgart at 1. FC Nürnberg on the 33 match day.
- The most goal-scoring draw was the 4-4 of VfL Bochum against SV Sandhausen on the 24 match day.
