= Christian Heidel =

German football executive (born 1963)

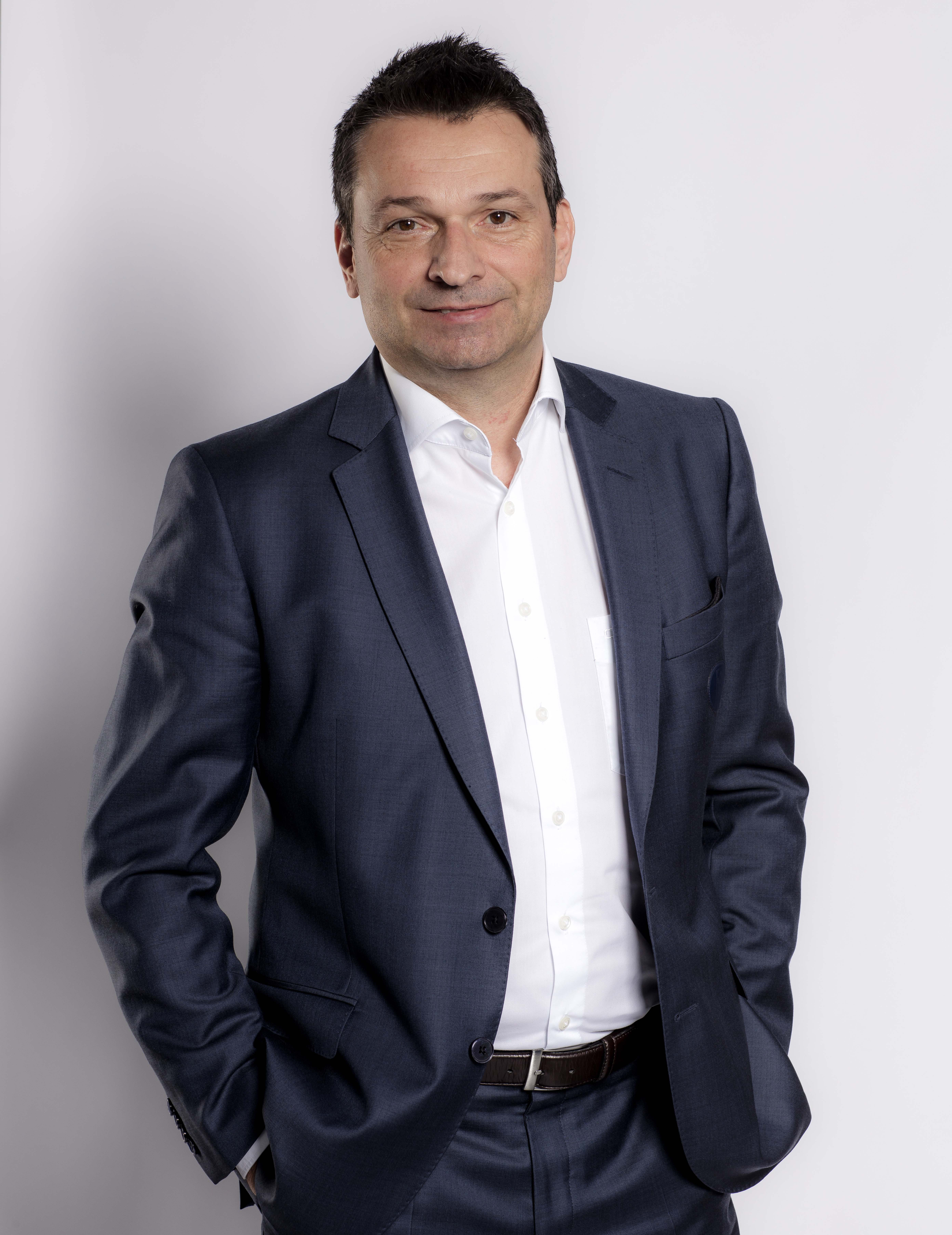
- Heidel in 2017
- Born: 2 June 1963 (age 63); Mainz, West Germany
- Occupations: Football executive and businessman
- Years active: 1992–
- Employer(s): FSV Mainz 05 (1992–2016); Schalke 04 (2016–2019); FSV Mainz 05 (since 2020)

Christian Heidel (born 2 June 1963) is a German football executive who works for FSV Mainz 05 and previously worked for Schalke 04.

== Career ==
=== 1. FSV Mainz 05 (1992–2016) ===
Heidel became Mainz 05's manager in 1992 and was a main architect of the club's rise and consolidation in the Bundesliga in the following years. He notably made Jürgen Klopp the club's coach in 2001, who would later go on to manage Borussia Dortmund and Liverpool F.C. Thomas Tuchel, who became head coach in 2009 after Heidel put coach Jörn Andersen on leave five days before the start of the Bundesliga season, is another internationally successful manager whose career on the professional level started under Heidel.

Under Tuchel, the 05er experienced their most successful time in the Bundesliga to date. In 2011 and 2014, 1. FSV Mainz 05 qualified for the Europa League by finishing 5th and 7th in the Bundesliga but failed to qualify for the group stage on both occasions. After the departure of Tuchel, Heidel committed the future Danish national coach Kasper Hjulmand in the summer of 2014, who was released after a phase of failure in February 2015 and replaced by the coach of the second team, Martin Schmidt. The youth development of the club was forced under Heidel. While the second team was still playing in the B class when Heidel started as manager, they rose to the 3rd division in the 2013/14 season after promotion for the seventh time. The youth training center of 1. FSV Mainz 05 is certified by the German Football League with the maximum of three stars. Under Thomas Tuchel, who later became head coach, the U-19s won the German A-Junior Championship in 2009 after beating Borussia Dortmund 2–1 in the final. Heidel's tasks in 2002 included the expansion of the Bruchweg Stadium, Mainz 05's home ground for many years, and the constructions of the new Coface Arena, where 05ers have played their home games since 2011. Under his responsibility, 1. FSV Mainz 05 increased its annual turnover from €3 million (1992) to €78 million (2014).

Another significant achievement of Heidel's time in Mainz was the construction of the club's new home venue, the Opel Arena (then known as COFACE ARENA). He also oversaw the promotion of the club's reserve team to the 3. Liga in 2014, the highest tier of the German football league system reserve teams are allowed to compete in. By the end of his time at Mainz, he had become the longest-serving executive manager in the league.

Heidel worked as a manager on a voluntary basis until September 2005. After his car dealership went bankrupt in 2005, he worked for the '05 in his main job. His employment contract was extended in 2012 until 2017. He resigned at the end of the 2015/16season, Mainz has not been in a relegation zone in the last 7 years since promotion.

=== FC Schalke 04 (2016–2019) ===
Mainz 05 announced that Heidel would leave the club after the end of the 2015–16 season on 21 February 2016. On the same day, Schalke 04 presented him as their new executive manager for the following season. Heidel installed Markus Weinzierl as the club's head coach, but sacked him the year after, as Schalke's tenth-place finish was insufficient to qualify them for any international competition. Weinzierl's successor Domenico Tedesco was initially more successful, with the club finishing runner-up in the 2017–18 season, but when the squad's performance drastically deteriorated in the following year, he was fired in March 2019, with club legend Huub Stevens filling in for the remainder of the season. Heidel himself had already handed in his resignation weeks earlier, assuming full responsibility for the team's decline. On 14 March 2019 Jochen Schneider was appointed as the new sports director, replacing Heidel prematurely.

=== Return to Mainz 05 (2020–) ===
Heidel returned to Mainz in late December 2020, replacing the departing Rouven Schröder. The club announced the dismissal of coach Jan-Moritz Lichte and the hiring of Martin Schmidt as sporting director on the same day, in a bid to avoid relegation. This was ultimately successful, as the team won nine of their seventeen games during the second half of the season and came in at a safe rank twelve.

== Personal life ==
After graduating from high school, Heidel completed vocational training as a bank clerk. In 1989 he bought a 20 percent stake in a BMW car dealership in Mainz, becoming its commercial director and limited partner.

He worked as a car salesman until 2005, when his car dealership declared bankruptcy. Up to this point, he had managed Mainz 05 on an honorary basis.

In August 2019, Heidel suffered a stroke while vacationing in Turkey.

Heidel is the father of two daughters and a son.
