= 2017–18 Bundesliga =

German association football competition

Bundesliga
- Season: 2017–18
- Dates: 18 August 2017 – 12 May 2018
- Champions: Bayern Munich; 27th Bundesliga title 28th German title
- Relegated: Hamburger SV; 1. FC Köln
- Champions League: Bayern Munich; Schalke 04; 1899 Hoffenheim; Borussia Dortmund
- Europa League: Bayer Leverkusen; RB Leipzig; Eintracht Frankfurt
- Matches: 306
- Goals: 855 (2.79 per match)
- Top goalscorer: Robert Lewandowski (29 goals)
- Biggest home win: Munich 6–0 Hamburger SV; 1899 Hoffenheim 6–0 1. FC Köln; Munich 6–0 Dortmund
- Biggest away win: Gladbach 1–5 Bayer Leverkusen; SC Freiburg 0–4 Munich; Hertha BSC 2–6 RB Leipzig
- Highest scoring: Dortmund 4–4 Schalke 04; Hannover 96 4–4 Bayer Leverkusen; Hertha BSC 2–6 RB Leipzig
- Longest winning run: 10 games Bayern Munich
- Longest unbeaten run: 13 games Bayern Munich
- Longest winless run: 16 games 1. FC Köln
- Longest losing run: 5 games 1. FC Köln; Hannover 96; SC Freiburg
- Highest attendance: 81,360; Dortmund v Gladbach; Dortmund v Munich; Dortmund v SC Freiburg; Dortmund v Hamburger SV
- Lowest attendance: 22,827; VfL Wolfsburg v RB Leipzig
- Attendance: 13,661,796 (44,646 per match)

The 2017–18 Bundesliga was the 55th season of the Bundesliga, Germany's premier football competition. It began on 18 August 2017 and concluded on 12 May 2018. The fixtures were announced on 29 June 2017.

Following an offline test phase in the previous season, the video assistant referee system was used for the first time in the Bundesliga on a trial basis following approval from IFAB.

Bayern Munich were the defending champions and won their 27th Bundesliga title on 7 April with five games to spare, winning a sixth consecutive title for the first time in their history. 1. FC Köln and Hamburger SV were relegated at the end of the season, with Hamburg therefore losing their status as the only ever-present team in Bundesliga history. Consequently, their northern rival Werder Bremen took the record for most seasons played in the Bundesliga, with 54 at the time, and Bayern inherited the most consecutive seasons record that is active, with 52 at the time, and they later broke the record in the 2020–21 season with their 56th straight season.

== Summary ==
One of the managerial changes before the start of the season was at Borussia Dortmund, who had finished third the previous season. After sacking Thomas Tuchel, they hired the Dutchman Peter Bosz in June 2017, after he had led Ajax to the 2017 UEFA Europa League Final. Dortmund were also the German club involved in the biggest transfer of the summer, selling young French forward Ousmane Dembélé to Barcelona for an initial €105 million. Meanwhile, reigning champions Bayern Munich prepared for the season by breaking the league's transfer record in their purchase of French midfielder Corentin Tolisso from Lyon for €41.5 million.

On 28 September 2017, Bayern sacked manager Carlo Ancelotti amidst reports of player unrest, despite the club sitting in third place. He was replaced by Jupp Heynckes in his fourth spell at the club. On 28 October, a 2–0 win over RB Leipzig put Bayern on top of the table for the first time in the season. In December, Dortmund sacked Bosz with the team in seventh, and replaced him with the Austrian Peter Stöger who himself had recently been dismissed by winless bottom team 1. FC Köln.

In the January 2018 transfer window, Dortmund lost the season's second-top scorer, Gabonese forward Pierre-Emerick Aubameyang, who moved to Arsenal for a €63 million fee. They replaced him by bringing in Chelsea's Michy Batshuayi on loan. From December to February, Bayern went on a 10-match winning streak that ended with a goalless draw with Hertha BSC at the Allianz Arena, and managed 13 unbeaten until a 1–2 loss at Leipzig on 18 March.

Dortmund remained unbeaten for 12 games between December and 31 March, when they lost 0–6 away to Bayern. Schalke 04, who finished only 10th the previous season, were in the top 3 for most of the season. They were unbeaten for 11 games between September and January, putting together six consecutive victories in February and March before a 2–3 loss at bottom team Hamburg.

Bayern won their 27th Bundesliga and 28th German title (6th consecutive) on 7 April 2018, with five games left to play after defeating fellow Bavarian club FC Augsburg 4–1. Three weeks later, Köln were the first team relegated after a 2–3 loss to SC Freiburg. On 5 May, Schalke secured second place and a return to the Champions League for the first time in four years, with a 2–1 win at Augsburg. On the last matchday, 1899 Hoffenheim beat Dortmund 3–1 to finish ahead of the latter on goal difference at an all-time high third place and securing a spot in the Champions League group stage for the first time in their history. Following VfL Wolfsburg's 4–1 win over Köln, Hamburg were relegated from the Bundesliga for the first time in their history.

Bayern Munich's Robert Lewandowski was the league's top scorer for the third time, a record for a foreign player. He scored 29 goals, 14 more than second-placed Nils Petersen of Freiburg.

== Teams ==
Locations of the 2017–18 Bundesliga teams

A total of 18 teams participated in this edition of the Bundesliga.

=== Team changes ===
Promoted from 2016–17 2. Bundesliga	Relegated from 2016–17 Bundesliga
VfB Stuttgart; Hannover 96	FC Ingolstadt; Darmstadt 98

=== Stadiums and locations ===
Team	Location	Stadium	Capacity	Ref.
FC Augsburg	Augsburg	WWK Arena	30,660	
Hertha BSC	Berlin	Olympiastadion	74,475	
Werder Bremen	Bremen	Weser-Stadion	42,100	
Borussia Dortmund	Dortmund	Signal Iduna Park	81,360	
Eintracht Frankfurt	Frankfurt	Commerzbank-Arena	51,500	
SC Freiburg	Freiburg im Breisgau	Schwarzwald-Stadion	24,000	
Hamburger SV	Hamburg	Volksparkstadion	57,000	
Hannover 96	Hanover	HDI-Arena	49,000	
1899 Hoffenheim	Sinsheim	Wirsol Rhein-Neckar-Arena	30,150	
1. FC Köln	Cologne	RheinEnergieStadion	49,698	
RB Leipzig	Leipzig	Red Bull Arena	42,558	
Bayer Leverkusen	Leverkusen	BayArena	30,000	
Mainz 05	Mainz	Opel Arena	34,000	
Borussia Mönchengladbach	Mönchengladbach	Borussia-Park	54,014	
Bayern Munich	Munich	Allianz Arena	75,000	
Schalke 04	Gelsenkirchen	Veltins-Arena	62,271	
VfB Stuttgart	Stuttgart	Mercedes-Benz Arena	60,449	
VfL Wolfsburg	Wolfsburg	Volkswagen Arena	30,000	

=== Personnel and kits ===
Team	Manager	Captain	Kit manufacturer	Shirt sponsor	
Team	Manager	Captain	Kit manufacturer	Front	Sleeve
FC Augsburg	(Germany) Manuel Baum	(Germany) Daniel Baier	Nike	WWK	baramundi software
Hertha BSC	(Hungary) Pál Dárdai	(Bosnia and Herzegovina) Vedad Ibišević	Nike	bet-at-home.com	TEDi
Werder Bremen	(Germany) Florian Kohfeldt	(Austria) Zlatko Junuzović	Nike	Wiesenhof	H-Hotels
Borussia Dortmund	(Austria) Peter Stöger	(Germany) Marcel Schmelzer	Puma	Evonik	Opel
Eintracht Frankfurt	(Croatia) Niko Kovač	(Germany) Alexander Meier	Nike	Indeed.com	Deutsche Börse Group
SC Freiburg	(Germany) Christian Streich	(Germany) Julian Schuster	Hummel	Schwarzwaldmilch	None
Hamburger SV	(Germany) Christian Titz	(Japan) Gōtoku Sakai	Adidas	Fly Emirates	Popp Feinkost
Hannover 96	(Germany) André Breitenreiter	(Germany) Edgar Prib	Jako	Heinz von Heiden	HDI
1899 Hoffenheim	(Germany) Julian Nagelsmann	(Poland) Eugen Polanski	Lotto	SAP	Prowin
1. FC Köln	(Germany) Stefan Ruthenbeck	(Germany) Matthias Lehmann	Erima	REWE	DEVK
RB Leipzig	(Austria) Ralph Hasenhüttl	(Germany) Dominik Kaiser	Nike	Red Bull	CG Immobilien
Bayer Leverkusen	(Germany) Heiko Herrlich	(Germany) Lars Bender	Jako	Barmenia Versicherungen	Westminster-Gruppe
Mainz 05	(Germany) Sandro Schwarz	(Germany) Stefan Bell	Lotto	Kömmerling	MFD Aviation
Borussia Mönchengladbach	(Germany) Dieter Hecking	(Germany) Lars Stindl	Kappa	Postbank	H-Hotels
Bayern Munich	(Germany) Jupp Heynckes	(Germany) Manuel Neuer	Adidas	Deutsche Telekom	Hamad Airport
Schalke 04	(Germany) Domenico Tedesco	(Germany) Ralf Fährmann	Adidas	Gazprom	Allyouneed Fresh
VfB Stuttgart	(Turkey) Tayfun Korkut	(Germany) Christian Gentner	Puma	Mercedes-Benz Bank	GAZİ
VfL Wolfsburg	(Germany) Bruno Labbadia	(Spain) Ignacio Camacho	Nike	Volkswagen	UPS

=== Managerial changes ===
Team	Outgoing	Manner	Exit date		Position in table	Incoming	Incoming date		Ref.
Team	Outgoing	Manner	Announced on	Departed on	Position in table	Incoming	Announced on	Arrived on	Ref.
Mainz 05	(Switzerland) Martin Schmidt	Sacked	22 May 2017	30 June 2017	Pre-season	(Germany) Sandro Schwarz	31 May 2017	1 July 2017	
Borussia Dortmund	(Germany) Thomas Tuchel	Sacked	30 May 2017	30 June 2017	Pre-season	(Netherlands) Peter Bosz	6 June 2017	1 July 2017	
Bayer Leverkusen	(Turkey) Tayfun Korkut	End of contract	13 May 2017	30 June 2017	Pre-season	(Germany) Heiko Herrlich	9 June 2017	1 July 2017	
Schalke 04	(Germany) Markus Weinzierl	Sacked	9 June 2017	30 June 2017	Pre-season	(Germany) Domenico Tedesco	9 June 2017	1 July 2017	
VfL Wolfsburg	(Netherlands) Andries Jonker	Sacked	18 September 2017		14th	(Switzerland) Martin Schmidt	18 September 2017		
Bayern Munich	(Italy) Carlo Ancelotti	Sacked	28 September 2017		3rd	(France) Willy Sagnol (interim)	28 September 2017		
Bayern Munich	(France) Willy Sagnol (interim)	End of caretaker spell	6 October 2017		2nd	(Germany) Jupp Heynckes	6 October 2017		
Werder Bremen	(Germany) Alexander Nouri	Sacked	30 October 2017		17th	(Germany) Florian Kohfeldt	30 October 2017		
1. FC Köln	(Austria) Peter Stöger	Sacked	3 December 2017		18th	(Germany) Stefan Ruthenbeck	3 December 2017		
Borussia Dortmund	(Netherlands) Peter Bosz	Sacked	10 December 2017		7th	(Austria) Peter Stöger	10 December 2017		
Hamburger SV	(Germany) Markus Gisdol	Sacked	21 January 2018		17th	(Germany) Bernd Hollerbach	22 January 2018		
VfB Stuttgart	(Germany) Hannes Wolf	Sacked	28 January 2018		15th	(Turkey) Tayfun Korkut	29 January 2018		
VfL Wolfsburg	(Switzerland) Martin Schmidt	Resigned	19 February 2018		14th	(Germany) Bruno Labbadia	20 February 2018		
Hamburger SV	(Germany) Bernd Hollerbach	Sacked	12 March 2018		17th	(Germany) Christian Titz	12 March 2018		

== League table ==
Pos	Team	Pld	W	D	L	GF	GA	GD	Pts	Qualification or relegation
1	Bayern Munich (C)	34	27	3	4	92	28	+64	84	Qualification for the Champions League group stage
2	Schalke 04	34	18	9	7	53	37	+16	63	Qualification for the Champions League group stage
3	1899 Hoffenheim	34	15	10	9	66	48	+18	55	Qualification for the Champions League group stage
4	Borussia Dortmund	34	15	10	9	64	47	+17	55	Qualification for the Champions League group stage
5	Bayer Leverkusen	34	15	10	9	58	44	+14	55	Qualification for the Europa League group stage
6	RB Leipzig	34	15	8	11	57	53	+4	53	Qualification for the Europa League second qualifying round
7	VfB Stuttgart	34	15	6	13	36	36	0	51	
8	Eintracht Frankfurt	34	14	7	13	45	45	0	49	Qualification for the Europa League group stage (Note: Eintracht Frankfurt qualified for the Europa League group stage by winning the 2017–18 DFB-Pokal.)
9	Borussia Mönchengladbach	34	13	8	13	47	52	−5	47	
10	Hertha BSC	34	10	13	11	43	46	−3	43	
11	Werder Bremen	34	10	12	12	37	40	−3	42	
12	FC Augsburg	34	10	11	13	43	46	−3	41	
13	Hannover 96	34	10	9	15	44	54	−10	39	
14	Mainz 05	34	9	9	16	38	52	−14	36	
15	SC Freiburg	34	8	12	14	32	56	−24	36	
16	VfL Wolfsburg (O)	34	6	15	13	36	48	−12	33	Qualification for the relegation play-offs
17	Hamburger SV (R)	34	8	7	19	29	53	−24	31	Relegation to 2. Bundesliga
18	1. FC Köln (R)	34	5	7	22	35	70	−35	22	Relegation to 2. Bundesliga

Source: DFB
Rules for classification: 1) Points; 2) Goal difference; 3) Goals scored; 4) Head-to-head results; 5) Head-to-head away goals scored; 6) Away goals scored; 7) Play-off.
(C) Champions; (O) Play-off winners; (R) Relegated

== Results ==
Home \ Away	AUG	BSC	BRE	DOR	FRA	FRE	HAM	HAN	HOF	KÖL	LEI	LEV	MAI	MÖN	MUN	SCH	STU	WOL
FC Augsburg	—	1–1	1–3	1–2	3–0	3–3	1–0	1–2	0–2	3–0	1–0	1–1	2–0	2–2	1–4	1–2	0–1	2–1
Hertha BSC	2–2	—	1–1	1–1	1–2	0–0	2–1	3–1	1–1	2–1	2–6	2–1	0–2	2–4	2–2	0–2	2–0	0–0
Werder Bremen	0–3	0–0	—	1–1	2–1	0–0	1–0	4–0	1–1	3–1	1–1	0–0	2–2	0–2	0–2	1–2	1–0	3–1
Borussia Dortmund	1–1	2–0	1–2	—	3–2	2–2	2–0	1–0	2–1	5–0	2–3	4–0	1–2	6–1	1–3	4–4	3–0	0–0
Eintracht Frankfurt	1–2	0–3	2–1	2–2	—	1–1	3–0	1–0	1–1	4–2	2–1	0–1	3–0	2–0	0–1	2–2	2–1	0–1
SC Freiburg	2–0	1–1	1–0	0–0	0–0	—	0–0	1–1	3–2	3–2	2–1	0–0	2–1	1–0	0–4	0–1	1–2	0–2
Hamburger SV	1–0	1–2	0–0	0–3	1–2	1–0	—	1–1	3–0	0–2	0–2	1–2	0–0	2–1	0–1	3–2	3–1	0–0
Hannover 96	1–3	3–1	2–1	4–2	1–2	2–1	2–0	—	2–0	0–0	2–3	4–4	3–2	0–1	0–3	1–0	1–1	0–1
1899 Hoffenheim	2–2	1–1	1–0	3–1	1–1	1–1	2–0	3–1	—	6–0	4–0	1–4	4–2	1–3	2–0	2–0	1–0	3–0
1. FC Köln	1–1	0–2	0–0	2–3	0–1	3–4	1–3	1–1	0–3	—	1–2	2–0	1–1	2–1	1–3	2–2	2–3	1–0
RB Leipzig	2–0	2–3	2–0	1–1	2–1	4–1	1–1	2–1	2–5	1–2	—	1–4	2–2	2–2	2–1	3–1	1–0	4–1
Bayer Leverkusen	0–0	0–2	1–0	1–1	4–1	4–0	3–0	3–2	2–2	2–1	2–2	—	2–0	2–0	1–3	0–2	0–1	2–2
Mainz 05	1–3	1–0	1–2	0–2	1–1	2–0	3–2	0–1	2–3	1–0	3–0	3–1	—	0–0	0–2	0–1	3–2	1–1
Borussia Mönchengladbach	2–0	2–1	2–2	0–1	0–1	3–1	3–1	2–1	3–3	1–0	0–1	1–5	1–1	—	2–1	1–1	2–0	3–0
Bayern Munich	3–0	0–0	4–2	6–0	4–1	5–0	6–0	3–1	5–2	1–0	2–0	3–1	4–0	5–1	—	2–1	1–4	2–2
Schalke 04	3–2	1–0	1–2	2–0	1–0	2–0	2–0	1–1	2–1	2–2	2–0	1–1	2–0	1–1	0–3	—	3–1	1–1
VfB Stuttgart	0–0	1–0	2–0	2–1	1–0	3–0	1–1	1–1	2–0	2–1	0–0	0–2	1–0	1–0	0–1	0–2	—	1–0
VfL Wolfsburg	0–0	3–3	1–1	0–3	1–3	3–1	1–3	1–1	1–1	4–1	1–1	1–2	1–1	3–0	1–2	0–1	1–1	—

Source: DFB
Legend: Blue = home team win; Yellow = draw; Red = away team win.

== Relegation play-offs ==
All times are UTC+2.

=== First leg ===
17 May 2018
20:30

VfL Wolfsburg	3–1	Holstein Kiel
Origi 13'; Brekalo 40'; Mallı 56'	Report	Schindler 34'

Volkswagen Arena, Wolfsburg
Attendance: 28,800
Referee: Deniz Aytekin

=== Second leg ===
21 May 2018
20:30

Holstein Kiel	0–1	VfL Wolfsburg
	Report	Knoche 75'

Holstein-Stadion, Kiel
Attendance: 12,000
Referee: Daniel Siebert

VfL Wolfsburg won 4–1 on aggregate and therefore both clubs remain in their respective leagues.

== Statistics ==
=== Top scorers ===
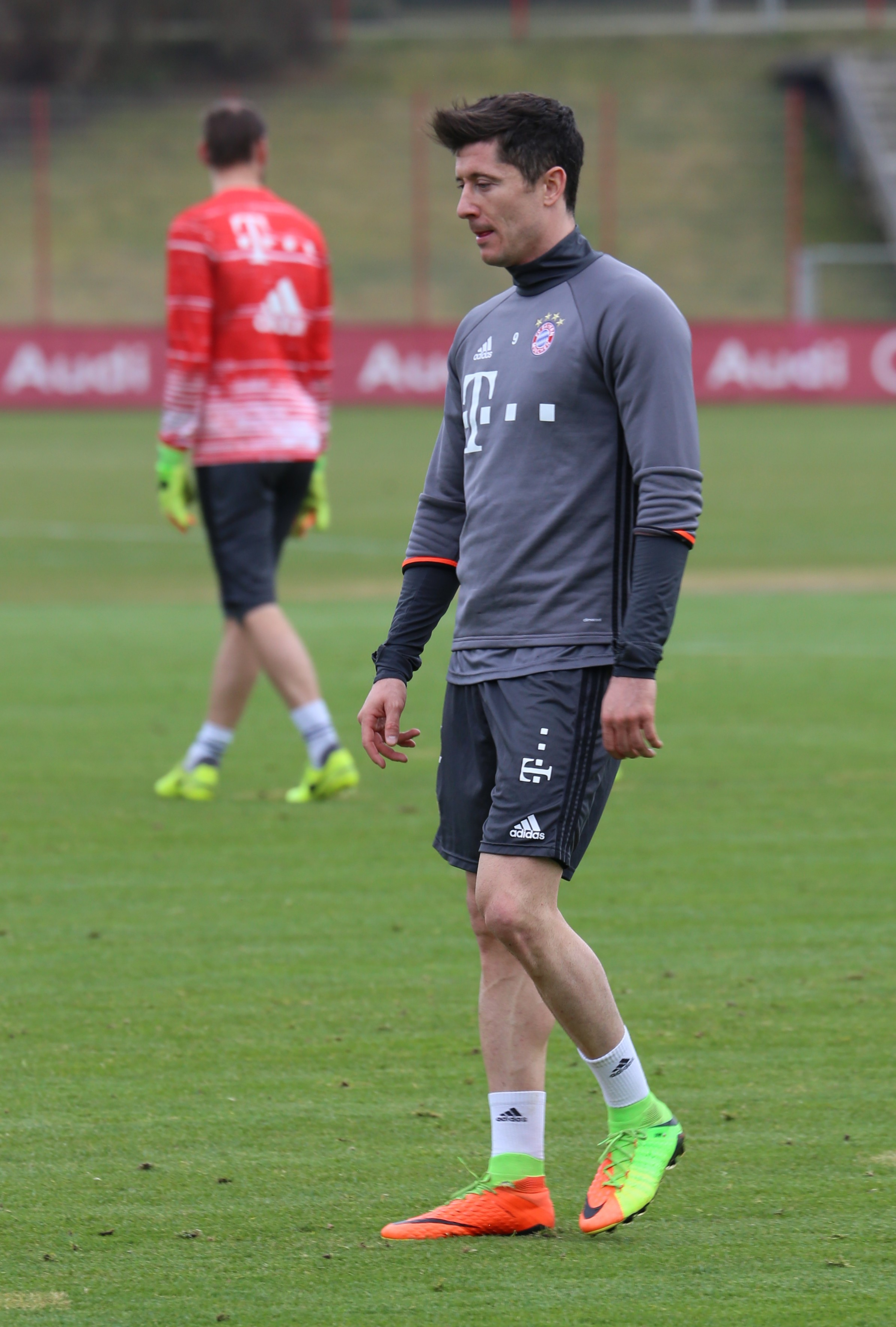
Robert Lewandowski was the top scorer for the third time, with 29 goals

Rank	Player	Club	Goals
1	(Poland) Robert Lewandowski	Bayern Munich	29
2	(Germany) Nils Petersen	SC Freiburg	15
3	(Germany) Niclas Füllkrug	Hannover 96	14
3	(Germany) Mark Uth	1899 Hoffenheim	14
3	(Germany) Kevin Volland	Bayer Leverkusen	14
6	(Gabon) Pierre-Emerick Aubameyang (Note: Aubameyang transferred from Borussia Dortmund to Arsenal during the winter break.)	Borussia Dortmund	13
6	(Austria) Michael Gregoritsch	FC Augsburg	13
6	(Croatia) Andrej Kramarić	1899 Hoffenheim	13
6	(Germany) Timo Werner	RB Leipzig	13
10	(Iceland) Alfreð Finnbogason	FC Augsburg	12
10	(Ivory Coast) Salomon Kalou	Hertha BSC	12
10	(Germany) Sandro Wagner (Note: Wagner transferred from 1899 Hoffenheim to Bayern Munich during the winter break.)	1899 Hoffenheim; Bayern Munich	12

=== Hat-tricks ===
Player	Club	Against	Result	Date
(Iceland) Alfreð Finnbogason	FC Augsburg	1. FC Köln	3–0	9 September 2017
(Gabon) Pierre-Emerick Aubameyang	Borussia Dortmund	Borussia Mönchengladbach	6–1	23 September 2017
(Germany) Max Kruse	Werder Bremen	Hannover 96	4–0	19 November 2017
(Germany) Nils Petersen	SC Freiburg	1. FC Köln	4–3	10 December 2017
(Iceland) Alfreð Finnbogason	FC Augsburg	SC Freiburg	3–3	16 December 2017
(Germany) Niclas Füllkrug	Hannover 96	Mainz 05	3–2	13 January 2018
(Poland) Robert Lewandowski	Bayern Munich	Hamburger SV	6–0	10 March 2018
(Poland) Robert Lewandowski	Bayern Munich	Borussia Dortmund	6–0	31 March 2018
(Germany) Kevin Volland	Bayer Leverkusen	Eintracht Frankfurt	4–1	14 April 2018
(Croatia) Andrej Kramarić	1899 Hoffenheim	Hannover 96	3–1	27 April 2018

=== Clean sheets ===
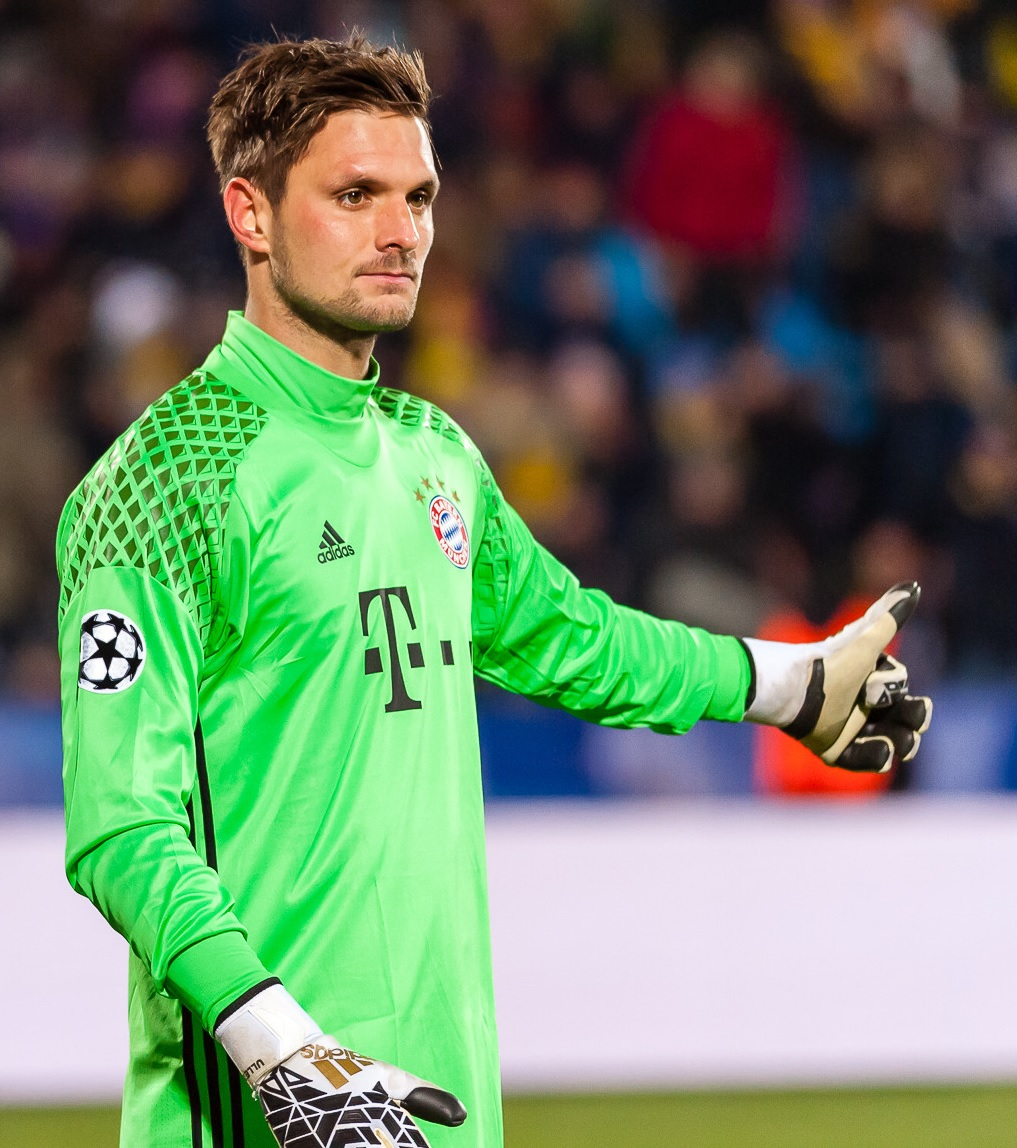
Four goalkeepers kept 12 clean sheets, among them Sven Ulreich, who played in the fewest matches (29)

Rank	Player	Club	Clean sheets
1	(Switzerland) Roman Bürki	Borussia Dortmund	12
1	(Germany) Ralf Fährmann	Schalke 04	12
1	(Germany) Sven Ulreich	Bayern Munich	12
1	(Germany) Ron-Robert Zieler	VfB Stuttgart	12
5	(Germany) Oliver Baumann	1899 Hoffenheim	10
5	(Germany) Bernd Leno	Bayer Leverkusen	10
7	(Switzerland) Marwin Hitz	FC Augsburg	9
7	(Germany) Alexander Schwolow	SC Freiburg	9
9	(Belgium) Koen Casteels	VfL Wolfsburg	8
9	(Czech Republic) Jiří Pavlenka	Werder Bremen	8

== Awards ==
=== Annual awards ===
Award	Winner	Club / Details
Rookie of the Season	(Morocco) Amine Harit	Schalke 04
Goal of the Season	(Germany) Jonas Hector	1. FC Köln
Save of the Season	(Germany) Bernd Leno	Bayer Leverkusen
VDV Player of the Season	(Poland) Robert Lewandowski	Bayern Munich

Team of the Year
Goalkeeper	(Finland) Lukas Hradecky (Eintracht Frankfurt)			
Defenders	(Brazil) Wendell (Bayer Leverkusen)	(Germany) Mats Hummels (Bayern Munich)	(Brazil) Naldo (Schalke 04)	(Germany) Joshua Kimmich (Bayern Munich)
Midfielders	(Jamaica) Leon Bailey (Bayer Leverkusen)	(Germany) Leon Goretzka (Schalke 04)	(Colombia) James Rodríguez (Bayern Munich)	(Germany) Thomas Müller (Bayern Munich)
Forwards	(Belgium) Michy Batshuayi (Borussia Dortmund)		(Poland) Robert Lewandowski (Bayern Munich)	

== Attendances ==
Rank	Team	Home games	Average attendance
1	Borussia Dortmund	17	79,496
2	Bayern München	17	75,000
3	Schalke 04	17	61,197
4	VfB Stuttgart	17	56,045
5	Borussia Mönchengladbach	17	50,986
6	Hamburger SV	17	50,656
7	Eintracht Frankfurt	17	49,159
8	1. FC Köln	17	48,776
9	Hertha BSC	17	45,319
10	Hannover 96	17	42,706
11	RB Leipzig	17	39,397
12	Werder Bremen	17	38,726
13	Mainz 05	17	28,766
14	TSG Hoffenheim	17	28,716
15	Bayer Leverkusen	17	28,415
16	FC Augsburg	17	28,238
17	VfL Wolfsburg	17	25,712
18	SC Freiburg	17	23,894
