= Manfred Lorenz =

German football manager

Personal information
- Date of birth: 26 September 1948 (age 78)

Managerial career
- Years: Team
- –1992: VfL Fontana Finthen
- 1992–2000: Mainz 05 II
- 1994, 1995, 1997, 2000: Mainz 05 (caretaker)
- 2000–2019: Mainz 05 II (director)

Manfred Lorenz (born 26 August 1948) is a German retired football manager. He was manager in the 2. Bundesliga on five occasions and overall seven matches, all for 1. FSV Mainz 05 on short caretaker tenures.
