= The Football Club Social Alliance =

Swiss-based nonprofit organization

- Formation: 2007
- Founder: Scort Foundation
- Type: Nonprofit organization
- Headquarters: Basel, Switzerland
- Fields: Sports
- President: Gigi Oeri
- Website: www.football-alliance.org

The Football Club Social Alliance (FCSA) is a network of professional European football clubs that team up for social change on a global level. The FCSA runs international projects in crisis- and development regions, and projects in disability football within Europe.

== History ==
The FCSA was established by the Scort Foundation, a politically and religiously independent non-profit foundation headquartered in Basel, Switzerland. The foundation was established according to Swiss foundation law on 27 January 2010.

In 2012, the Queens Park Rangers F.C. joined the FCSA's partnership programme.

In May 2016, the FCSA launched the young coach education programme in Jordan. In September 2017, the FCSA launched its programme in Lebanon in collaboration with the United Nations High Commissioner for Refugees (UNHCR) and the Lebanese Football Association. In March 2018, the 1. FSV Mainz 05 joined the FCSA's partnership programme.

== Description ==
The FCSA Young Coach Education provides expert instruction from member football clubs to young adults from crisis regions. After training, the FCSA assists the "Young Coaches" in setting up football programs for children in their community. The program's stated goal is to "empower committed young adults (Young Coaches) in their role as proactive community leaders – on and off the pitch". As of 2026 the program has operated in 19 regions around the world.

Scort Foundation is responsible for all conceptual and organisational tasks, including the project management, fundraising and partnerships of the FCSA. The curriculum of the Young Coach Education programme was developed by Scort. Evaluations ensure that programme quality is maintained, and social impact is maximised.

== Partners ==
- (Switzerland) FC Basel 1893
- (Germany) SV Werder Bremen
- (Germany) Bayer 04 Leverkusen
- FK Austria Wien
- (Germany) FC Schalke 04
- (Germany) 1. FSV Mainz 05 (since 2018)

== Board of directors ==
- Gigi Oeri (President)
- Pierino Lardi (Vice President)
- Pierre Jaccoud
- Claudio Sulser
