= Hans Geiger (footballer) =

German footballer

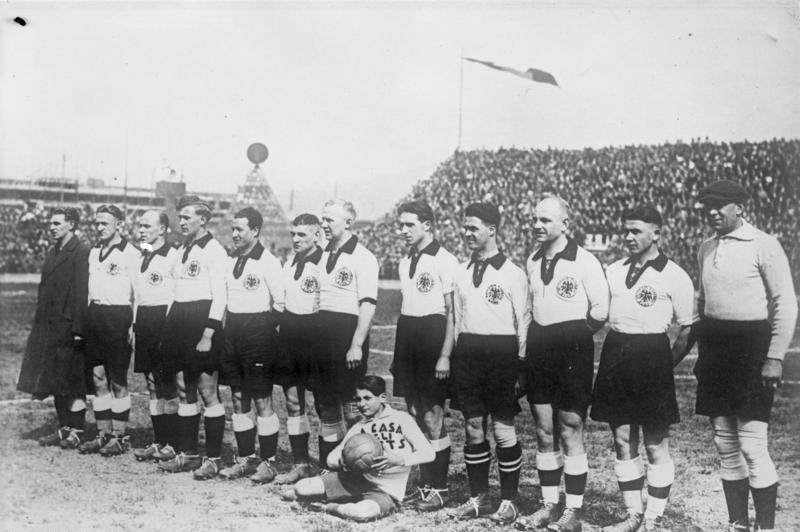

Personal information
- Date of birth: 24 December 1905
- Date of death: 17 December 1974 (aged 68)
- Position: Midfielder

Senior career*
Years	Team	Apps	(Gls)
1924–1929	1. FC Nürnberg		
1929–1930	ASN Nürnberg		
1930–1932	Tennis Borussia Berlin		
1932–1934	BFC Viktoria 1889		
1941–1942	Juventus București		

International career
1926–1929	Germany	6	(0)

Managerial career
- 1950–1952: 1. FSV Mainz 05
- * Club domestic league appearances and goals

Hans Geiger (24 December 1905 – 17 December 1974) was a German international footballer.
