= Georg Bayerer =

German footballer and coach

Personal information
- Date of birth: 9 April 1915
- Date of death: 6 June 1998 (aged 83)
- Position: Goalkeeper

Senior career*
Years	Team	Apps	(Gls)
1942–1949	TSV 1860 München	98	(2)
1949–1950	Bayern München	19	(0)
Total		117	(2)

Managerial career
- 1952–1953: 1. FSV Mainz 05
- 1953–1954: Bayern München
- 1954–1956: Stuttgarter Kickers
- 1960–1961: Jahn Regensburg
- 1964–1967: TSV Straubing
- * Club domestic league appearances and goals

Georg Bayerer (9 April 1915 – 6 June 1998) was a German footballer and coach.
