= Sandro Schwarz =

German footballer and manager

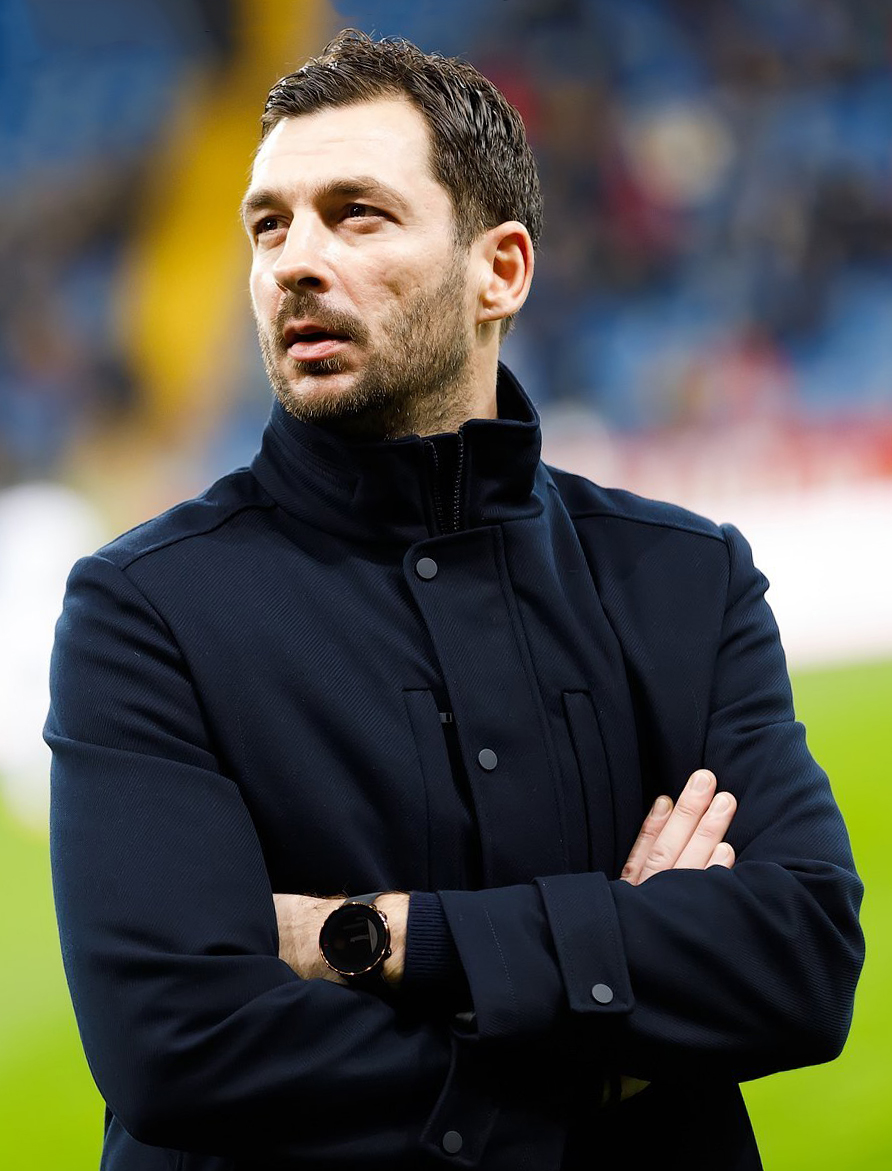
- Schwarz with Dynamo Moscow in 2020

Personal information
- Date of birth: 17 October 1978 (age 48)
- Place of birth: Mainz, West Germany
- Height: 1.86 m (6 ft 1 in)
- Position: Midfielder

Team information
- Current team: Dynamo Moscow (manager)

Youth career
- –1993: SV 07 Bischofsheim
- 1993–1995: VfB Ginsheim
- 1995–1997: Mainz 05

Senior career*
Years	Team	Apps	(Gls)
1998–2004	Mainz 05	100	(2)
2004–2005	Rot-Weiss Essen	16	(0)
2005–2009	Wehen Wiesbaden	101	(2)
Total		227	(4)

Managerial career
- 2009–2010: Wehen Wiesbaden
- 2011–2013: 1. FC Eschborn
- 2015–2017: Mainz 05 II
- 2017–2019: Mainz 05
- 2020–2022: Dynamo Moscow
- 2022–2023: Hertha BSC
- 2023–2025: New York Red Bulls
- 2026–: Dynamo Moscow
- * Club domestic league appearances and goals

Sandro Schwarz (German pronunciation: [ˈzandʁo ˈʃvaʁts]; born 17 October 1978) is a German football manager and a former player who is the manager of Russian Premier League club Dynamo Moscow.

== Coaching career ==
On 23 March 2009, after the dismissal of coach Wolfgang Frank, Schwarz became team manager of SV Wehen Wiesbaden and initially suspended his active playing career until the summer. In the 2008/09 season he was only able to train SV Wehen Wiesbaden as head of the coaching staff without a coaching license with a special permit from the DFB. After relegation to the 3rd league, he worked as an assistant coach alongside head coach Hans Werner Moser from the 2009/10 season until his dismissal on 9 March 2010 and, after his leave of absence, his successor Gino Lettieri.

At the beginning of the 2011/12 season, Schwarz became a coach at 1. FC Eschborn in the Hessenliga, with whom he became champions in his first season and was promoted to the newly founded Regionalliga Südwest.After promotion, he extended his contract for the 2012/13 season, during which he successfully completed his training licenses.

For the 2013/14 season, Schwarz moved to his old club, 1. FSV Mainz 05, where he took over as head coach of the A-Juniors (U19). There he became coach of the second team on 17 February 2015, succeeding Martin Schmidt, who took over the first team. For the 2017/18 season he was again introduced as Schmidt's successor as head coach of the first team. On 5 May 2018, Schwarz led Mainz to a famous 2–1 victory over Borussia Dortmund, to help seal another year in the Bundesliga.

On 14 October 2020, he was hired as manager by the Russian Premier League club FC Dynamo Moscow. Schwarz was invited to Dynamo by their director of sports Željko Buvač. Buvač worked as an assistant manager to Jürgen Klopp at Mainz 05 for 3 seasons when Schwarz played for the club. Schwarz formally lost his first match as head coach to CSKA Moscow, but he did not personally arrive in Moscow by the time of that game due to paperwork delays related to the COVID-19 pandemic in Russia, and the game was managed by Alyaksandr Kulchy in his stead.

In April 2021, reports appeared in the German media about the possible invitation of Schwarz to Eintracht Frankfurt instead of the outgoing Adi Hütter. In response, Schwarz said that he was completely focused on Dynamo, and the spread of rumors in the sports media is an "integral part of football".

In the 2021–22 season, Dynamo won 4 out of their first 5 games and took the top spot in the standings. He was chosen as league's coach of the month for the games played in July and August, and once again for September. When the regular Russian season's 2.5-months winter break started in December 2021, Dynamo was in second place, two points behind the league-leading Zenit. That was the highest position Dynamo took into the winter break since RPL switched to fall-to-spring schedule in the 2011–12 season. 36 points that Dynamo gained in 18 games played up to that point was the highest for the club since the 1996 season. On 15 December 2021, Schwarz extended his contract with Dynamo until the end of the 2023–24 season. He was chosen as league's coach of the month again for November–December 2021. Dynamo remained in second place in the league for most of the season before some late Dynamo losses allowed Zenit to secure the title with three games left to play in the season. The club also qualified for the 2021–22 Russian Cup final, their first Russian Cup final appearance since 2012. On the last matchday of the league season on 21 May 2022, Dynamo lost 1–5 at home to PFC Sochi and dropped to 3rd place, letting Sochi overtake them, as Dynamo only gained 1 point in last 5 league games of the season. Still, that was the first Top-3 finish for Dynamo since 2008. On 29 May 2022, Dynamo lost the Russian Cup final to Spartak 1–2, with Daniil Fomin missing the penalty kick deep in added time. Schwarz resigned from Dynamo following the final.

In June 2022, he joined Hertha BSC, signing a contract until 2024. He was sacked on 16 April 2023, following a 5–2 loss to Schalke 04 that left Hertha at the bottom of the table.

On 14 December 2023, the New York Red Bulls of Major League Soccer announced Schwarz as their new head coach. On 27 October 2025, he parted ways with the Red Bulls.

On 22 May 2026, Schwarz returned to Dynamo Moscow on a three-year contract. He was selected as league's coach of the month for September 2026 after winning all three games Dynamo played during that month.

== Career statistics ==
Appearances and goals by club, season and competition
Club	Season	League			Cup		Total	
Club	Season	Division	Apps	Goals	Apps	Goals	Apps	Goals
Mainz 05	1997–98	2. Bundesliga	1	0	0	0	1	0
Mainz 05	1998–99	2. Bundesliga	6	0	0	0	6	0
Mainz 05	2000–01	2. Bundesliga	28	0	2	0	30	0
Mainz 05	2001–02	2. Bundesliga	20	3	2	0	22	3
Mainz 05	2002–03	2. Bundesliga	24	0	1	0	25	0
Mainz 05	2003–04	2. Bundesliga	21	0	1	0	22	0
Mainz 05	Total		100	3	6	0	106	3
Mainz 05 II	2003–04	Regionalliga Süd	1	0	—		1	0
Rot Weiss Essen	2004–05	2. Bundesliga	16	0	1	0	17	0
Wehen Wiesbaden	2005–06	Regionalliga Süd	19	0	—		19	0
Wehen Wiesbaden	2006–07	Regionalliga Süd	31	0	—		31	0
Wehen Wiesbaden	2007–08	2. Bundesliga	30	2	1	0	31	2
Wehen Wiesbaden	2008–09	2. Bundesliga	21	0	3	1	24	1
Wehen Wiesbaden	Total		101	2	4	1	105	3
Career total			218	5	11	1	229	6

== Managerial record ==
As of match played on 22 November 2026

Managerial record by team and tenure
Team	Nat	From	To	Record								Ref
Team	Nat	From	To	G	W	D	L	GF	GA	GD	Win %	Ref
1. FC Eschborn	(Germany)	1 July 2011	30 June 2013	70	34	15	21	120	91	+29	48.57	
Mainz 05 II	(Germany)	17 February 2015	30 June 2017	89	28	23	38	106	120	−14	31.46	
Mainz 05	(Germany)	1 July 2017	10 November 2019	85	27	16	42	109	152	−43	31.76	
Dynamo Moscow	(Russia)	14 October 2020	29 May 2022	58	31	9	18	97	74	+23	53.45	
Hertha BSC	(Germany)	1 July 2022	16 April 2023	29	5	8	16	37	59	−22	17.24	
New York Red Bulls	(United States)	14 December 2023	27 October 2025	81	28	27	26	122	110	+12	34.57	
Dynamo Moscow	(Russia)	22 May 2026	present	20	13	2	5	31	18	+13	65.00	
Total				432	166	100	166	632	624	+8	38.43	—
