= Nico Willig =

German football coach

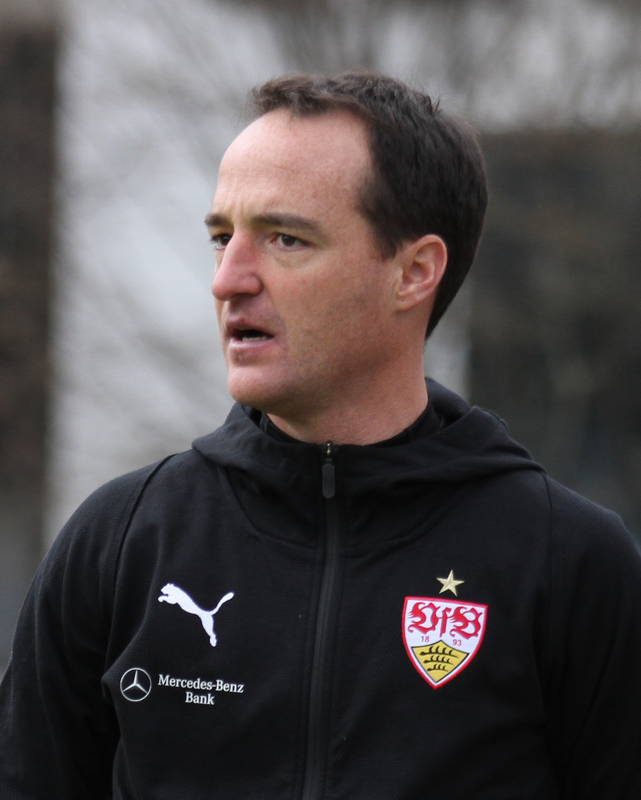

Personal information
- Date of birth: 11 December 1980 (age 45)
- Place of birth: Tübingen, West Germany
- Position: Defender

Team information
- Current team: VfB Stuttgart II (head coach)

Youth career
- TSG Balingen
- TuS Ergenzingen

Senior career*
Years	Team	Apps	(Gls)
2000–2011	TSG Balingen		
2011–2013	TSG Balingen II		

Managerial career
- 2013–2014: TSG Balingen
- 2019: VfB Stuttgart (caretaker)
- 2025–: VfB Stuttgart II
- * Club domestic league appearances and goals

Nico Willig (born 11 December 1980) is a German football coach who is currently the head coach of 3. Liga club VfB Stuttgart II.

== Coaching career ==
Willig began his coaching career at TSG Balingen, where he was the manager for the 2013/14 season before leaving the club. In the summer of 2015, Willig then became manager of the under-19 team of Stuttgarter Kickers. In January 2016, he moved to the youth department of VfB Stuttgart and became manager of the club's U16's. A half year later, he was promoted to U17 manager, which he was until the summe 2018, where he took charge of the U19's.

On 20 April 2019, Willig took over as Head coach of VfB Stuttgart on interim basis until the end of the 2018–19 Bundesliga season.

In June 2025, he took over the head coaching role at VfB Stuttgart II.
