= Boris Schommers =

German football manager

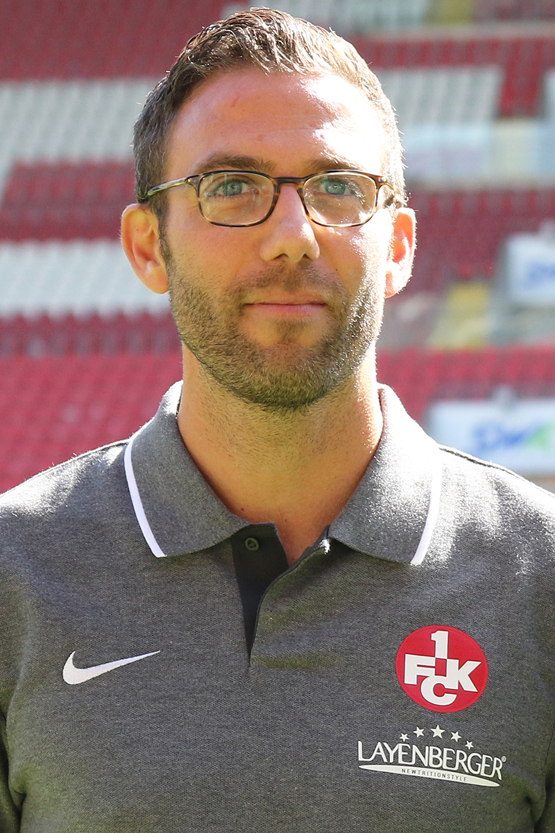
- Schommers in 2019

Personal information
- Date of birth: 19 January 1979 (age 47)
- Place of birth: Leverkusen, West Germany

Managerial career
- Years: Team
- 2019: 1. FC Nürnberg (interim)
- 2019–2020: 1. FC Kaiserslautern
- 2022–2023: 1. FC Düren
- 2023–2024: MSV Duisburg
- 2025–2026: Sportfreunde Siegen

Boris Schommers (born 19 January 1979) is a German professional football manager. He is currently a coach at Regionalliga club Sportfreunde Siegen.

== Career ==
=== 1. FC Köln ===
Schommers has been working in 1. FC Köln's youth department since 2006. At the beginning of the 2010–11 season, he was appointed coach of the under-17 squad and led them to an Under 17 Bundesliga championship in his first year. He coached the team for two more seasons before taking over the under-19 squad in the 2013–14 season. In 2015, Schommers completed his UEFA Pro Licence.

=== 1. FC Nürnberg ===
At the beginning of the 2017–18 2. Bundesliga season, Schommers was appointed as assistant manager under Michael Köllner at 1. FC Nürnberg. Together, they were promoted to the Bundesliga. After 21 matchdays in the 2018–19 season, the club was in last place with 12 points, which led to Köllner being sacked and Schommers taking over as interim coach. Under Schommers, the team gained seven points until the 33rd matchday, which meant that they were assured of relegation one matchday before the end of the season. Before the last matchday, 1. FC Nürnberg announced that Schommers would leave the club at the end of the season. The club finally completed the season in last place with 19 points.

=== Later career ===
On 19 September 2019, Schommers was appointed as manager of 3. Liga team 1. FC Kaiserslautern. He replaced Sascha Hildmann, who had been sacked after Kaiserslautern was only placed 14th with nine points after eight matchdays. He was sacked on 29 September 2020.

After one year at 1. FC Düren, he moved to MSV Duisburg. He was sacked on 23 April 2024.

From 28 October 2025, he took over as head coach of the Regionalliga club Sportfreunde Siegen, succeeding Thorsten Nehrbauer. On 9 August 2026 was dismissed Boris Scommer.
