= 1. FSV Mainz 05 =

German association football club

Mainz 05
- Full name: 1. Fußball- und Sportverein Mainz 05 e.V.
- Nicknames: Die Nullfünfer (the 05ers), Karnevalsverein (Carnival club)
- Founded: 16 March 1905; 121 years ago
- Stadium: MEWA Arena
- Capacity: 33,305
- Board Member: Stefan Hofmann (Chairman); Christian Heidel (Strategy, Sport & Communication Director); Jochen Röttgermann (Marketing Director)
- Head coach: Urs Fischer
- League: Bundesliga
- 2025–26: Bundesliga, 10th of 18
- Website: mainz05.de
Home colours	Away colours	Third colours

1. Fußball- und Sport-Verein Mainz 05 e. V., usually shortened to 1. FSV Mainz 05 or simply Mainz 05 (German pronunciation: [ˌmaɪnts nʊl ˈfʏnf]), is a German professional sports club, founded in 1905 and based in Mainz, Rhineland-Palatinate. Mainz 05 play in the Bundesliga, the top tier of the German football league system, having most recently been promoted ahead of the 2009–10 season. The club's main local rivals are Eintracht Frankfurt and Kaiserslautern. In addition to the football division, Mainz 05 have handball and table tennis departments.

== History ==
=== Early years ===
A failed attempt to start a football club in the city in 1903 was followed up two years later by the successful creation of 1. Mainzer Fussballclub Hassia 1905. After a number of years of play in the Süddeutschen Fußballverband (South German Football League), the club merged with FC Hermannia 07 – the former football side of Mainzer TV 1817 – to form 1. Mainzer Fussballverein Hassia 05, which dropped "Hassia" from its name in August 1912. Another merger after World War I, in 1919, with Sportverein 1908 Mainz, resulted in the formation of 1. Mainzer Fußball- und Sportverein 05. Die Nullfünfer ("05") was a solid club that earned several regional league championships in the period between the wars and qualified for the opening round of the national championships in 1921, after winning the Kreisliga Hessen.

=== Play during the Nazi era ===
In the late 1920s and early 1930s, the club played in the Bezirksliga Main-Hessen – Gruppe Hessen, and the results included first-place finishes in 1932 and 1933. The results merited the team a place in the Gauliga Südwest, one of 16 new first-division leagues formed in the re-organization of German football under the Third Reich. The club played only a single season at that level before being relegated, due to the high intensity play that they were unable to keep up with. Karl Scherm scored in 23 out of 44 matches with Mainz during his last season. In 1938, Mainz was forced into a merger with Reichsbahn SV Mainz and played as Reichsbahn SV Mainz 05 until the end of World War II.

=== Long march to the Bundesliga ===
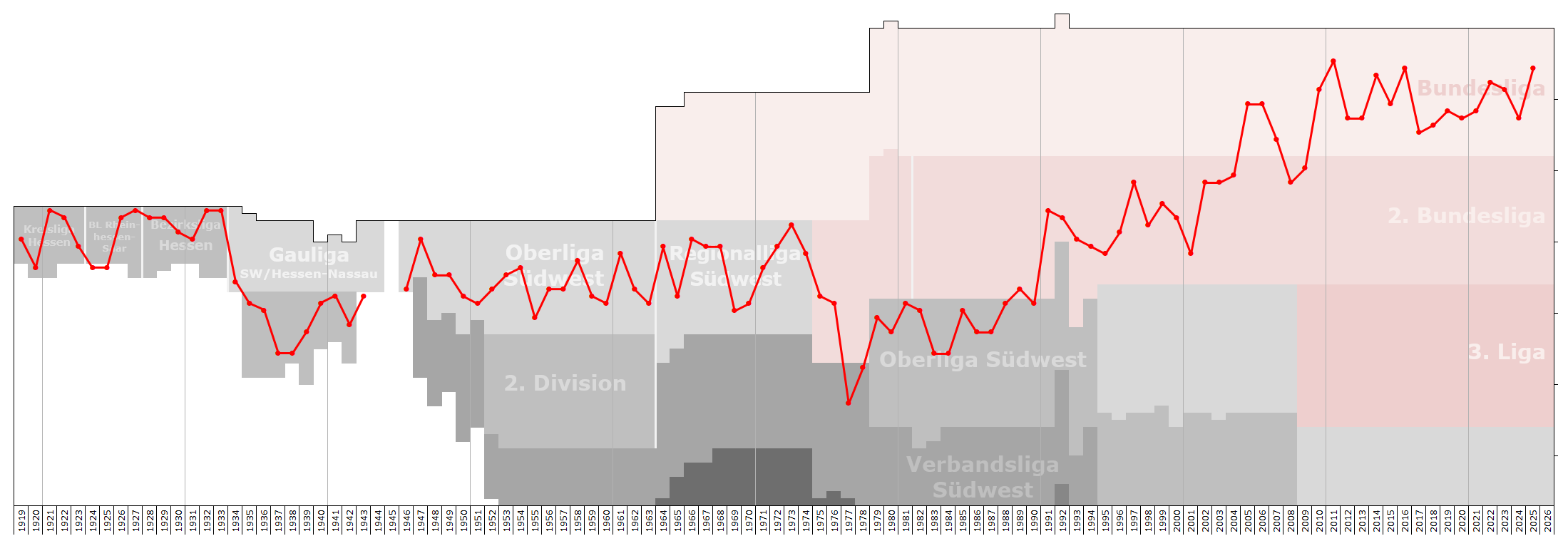
Historical chart of 1. FSV Mainz league performance

After World War II, the club again joined the upper ranks of league play in Germany's Oberliga Südwest, but were never better than a mid-table side. It played in the top flight until the founding of the new professional league, the Bundesliga, in 1963 and would go on to play as a second division side for most of the next four decades. They withdrew for a time – from the late 1970s into the late 1980s – to the Amateur Oberliga Südwest (III), as the result of a series of financial problems. Mainz earned honours as the German amateur champions in 1982.

The club returned to professional play with promotion to the 2. Bundesliga for a single season in 1988–89 with Bodo Hertlein as president, before finally returning for an extended run in 1990–91. Initially, they were perennial relegation candidates, struggling hard each season to avoid being sent down. However, under unorthodox trainer Wolfgang Frank, Mainz became one of the first clubs in German football to adopt a flat four zone defence, as opposed to the then-popular man-to-man defence using a libero.

Mainz had three unsuccessful attempts to get to the top flight in 1996–97, 2001–02, and 2002–03, with close fourth-place finishes just out of the promotion zone. The last of those attempts stung as they were denied promotion in the 93rd minute of the last match of the season. One year earlier, Mainz became the best non-promoted team of all time in the 2. Bundesliga, with 64 points accumulated. However, the club's persistence paid dividends after promotion to the Bundesliga in 2003–04 under head coach Jürgen Klopp. The club played three seasons in the top flight, but were relegated at the end of the 2006–07 season. Mainz secured promotion to the top flight again two years later, after the 2008–09 season.

Mainz also earned a spot in the 2005–06 UEFA Cup in their debut Bundesliga season as Germany's nominee in the Fair Play draw which acknowledges positive play, respect for one's opponent, respect for the referee, the behaviour of the crowd and of team officials, as well as cautions and dismissals. Due to the Bruchweg stadium's limited capacity, the home matches in UEFA Cup were played in Frankfurt's Commerzbank-Arena. After defeating Armenian club Mika and Icelandic club Keflavík in the qualifying rounds, Mainz lost to eventual champions Sevilla 2–0 on aggregate in the first round.

In the 2010–11 season, Mainz equalled the Bundesliga starting record by winning their first seven matches that season. They ended the season with their best finish to date in fifth place, good enough to secure them their second entry to the UEFA Europa League, where they were eliminated in the third qualifying round by Romanian club Gaz Metan Mediaș.

On the final matchday of the 2022–23 season, Mainz secured a 2–2 draw against league leaders Borussia Dortmund at their stadium, causing the latter to lose the title to Bayern Munich on goal difference.

The 2023–24 season was challenging for Mainz, as they spent most of it in 17th place, with only two wins by matchday 25. However, they drastically improved under coach Bo Henriksen, remaining unbeaten in their last nine matches and winning five of them, including the final two against Borussia Dortmund and VfL Wolfsburg. This impressive run lifted them from 16th to 13th place, ensuring their continued presence in the Bundesliga. In the 2024–25 season, Mainz surged to third place by late March 2025 after a 3–1 win over Borussia Mönchengladbach, raising hopes of first-ever UEFA Champions League qualification. However, a 2–2 home draw with SC Freiburg, followed by a 3–1 away defeat to Dortmund, triggered a seven-match winless streak that saw Mainz slip to seventh place with two games remaining in the season. They eventually finished sixth, qualifying for the Conference League.

== Recent seasons ==
The recent season-by-season performance of the club:

Season	Division	Tier	Position
1999–00	2. Bundesliga	II	9th
2000–01	2. Bundesliga	II	14th
2001–02	2. Bundesliga	II	4th
2002–03	2. Bundesliga	II	4th
2003–04	2. Bundesliga	II	3rd ↑
2004–05	Bundesliga	I	11th
2005–06	Bundesliga	I	11th
2006–07	Bundesliga	I	16th ↓
2007–08	2. Bundesliga	II	4th
2008–09	2. Bundesliga	II	2nd ↑
2009–10	Bundesliga	I	9th
2010–11	Bundesliga	I	5th
2011–12	Bundesliga	I	13th
2012–13	Bundesliga	I	13th
2013–14	Bundesliga	I	7th
2014–15	Bundesliga	I	11th
2015–16	Bundesliga	I	6th
2016–17	Bundesliga	I	15th
2017–18	Bundesliga	I	14th
2018–19	Bundesliga	I	12th
2019–20	Bundesliga	I	13th
2020–21	Bundesliga	I	12th
2021–22	Bundesliga	I	8th
2022–23	Bundesliga	I	9th
2023–24	Bundesliga	I	13th
2024–25	Bundesliga	I	6th
2025–26	Bundesliga	I	10th
2026–27	Bundesliga	I	

Key

↑ Promoted	↓ Relegated

== Stadium ==
The club plays its home matches at Mewa Arena, a new stadium opened in 2011 with a capacity of 33,305. The first event held at the new arena was the LIGA total! Cup 2011, which took place from 19 July through to 20 July 2011, with the other participants being Bayern Munich, Borussia Dortmund and Hamburger SV.

Die Nullfünfer previously played at the Bruchwegstadion, built in 1928, and modified several times over the years to hold a crowd of over 20,300 spectators. Averaging crowds of about 15,000 while in the 2. Bundesliga, the team's hard won recent success had them regularly filling their venue. The average home league attendance during the 2015–16 season in the Mewa Arena was 30,324 spectators.

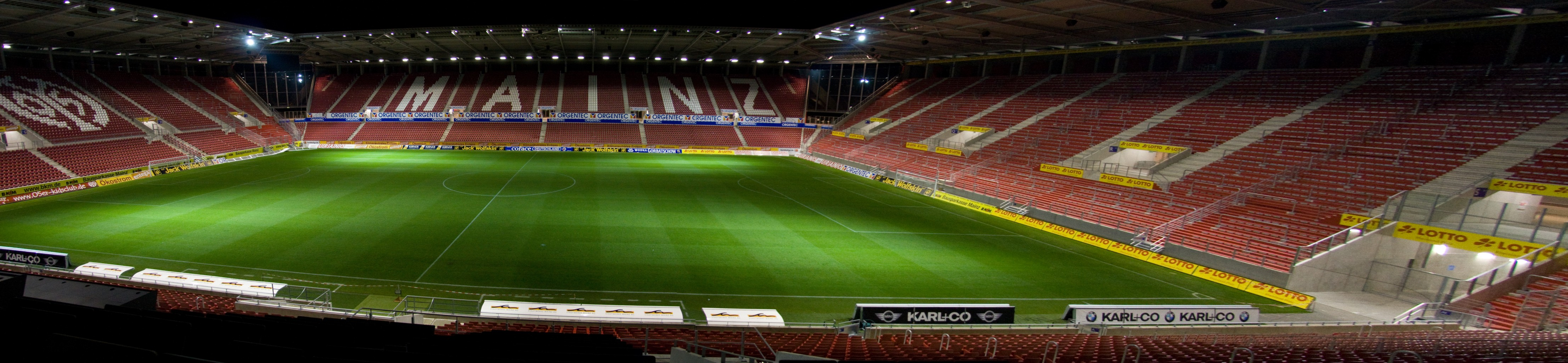
A panorama view of the Mewa Arena

== Club culture ==
Mainz is known for being one of the three foremost carnival cities in Germany, the others being Düsseldorf and Cologne. After every Mainzer goal scored at a home match, the "Narrhallamarsch", a famous German carnival tune, is played.

On 27 October 2023, Mainz sacked footballer Anwar El Ghazi after a social media post where called for an end to the post-7 October Israeli offensive in Gaza. El Ghazi was accused of antisemitism by Mainz after his comments where he condemned "apartheid" and "genocide" in Gaza. In November 2023, Mainz Labour Court found Mainz guilty of wrongful dismissal and the club was ordered to honour Anwar El Ghazi's contract in full, including salary, contract extension, and bonuses.

== Reserve team ==
The club's reserve team, Mainz 05 II, has also, with the rise of the senior side to Bundesliga level, risen through the ranks. The team first reached Oberliga level in 1999, followed by promotion to the Regionalliga in 2003. After playing there for two seasons, the team dropped to the Oberliga once more. In 2008, it won promotion to the Regionalliga West again and when this league was reduced in size in 2012, it entered the new Regionalliga Südwest. A third-place finish in this league in 2014 allowed the team to enter the promotion round to the 3. Liga, where it was successful against the Regionalliga Nordost champions and played at this level in 2014–15.

== European record ==
Season	Competition	Round	Opponent	Home	Away	Aggregate
2005–06	UEFA Cup	1Q	(Armenia) Mika	4–0	0–0	4–0
2005–06	UEFA Cup	2Q	(Iceland) Keflavík	2–0	2–0	4–0
2005–06	UEFA Cup	1R	(Spain) Sevilla	0–2	0–0	0–2
2011–12	UEFA Europa League	3Q	(Romania) Gaz Metan Mediaș	1–1	1–1 (a.e.t.)	2–2 (3–4 p)
2014–15	UEFA Europa League	3Q	(Greece) Asteras Tripolis	1–0	1–3	2–3
2016–17	UEFA Europa League	Group C	(Belgium) Anderlecht	1–1	1–6	3rd
2016–17	UEFA Europa League	Group C	(France) Saint-Étienne	1–1	0–0	3rd
2016–17	UEFA Europa League	Group C	(Azerbaijan) Gabala	2–0	3–2	3rd
2025–26	UEFA Conference League	PO	(Norway) Rosenborg	4–1	1–2	5–3
2025–26	UEFA Conference League	LP	(Cyprus) Omonia	—N/a	1–0	7th
2025–26	UEFA Conference League	LP	(Bosnia and Herzegovina) Zrinjski Mostar	1–0	—N/a	7th
2025–26	UEFA Conference League	LP	(Italy) Fiorentina	2–1	—N/a	7th
2025–26	UEFA Conference League	LP	(Romania) Universitatea Craiova	—N/a	0–1	7th
2025–26	UEFA Conference League	LP	(Poland) Lech Poznań	—N/a	1–1	7th
2025–26	UEFA Conference League	LP	(Turkey) Samsunspor	2–0	—N/a	7th
2025–26	UEFA Conference League	R16	(Czech Republic) Sigma Olomouc	2–0	0–0	2–0
2025–26	UEFA Conference League	QF	(France) Strasbourg	2–0	0–4	2–4

Notes

- 1Q: First qualifying round
- 2Q: Second qualifying round
- 3Q: Third qualifying round
- PO: Play-off round
- LP: League phase
- 1R: First round
- R16: Round of 16

== Honours ==
League

- German amateur champions: 1982
- Regionalliga Südwest (II) champions: 1973
- Oberliga Südwest (III) champions: 1981, 1988, 1990
- Amateurliga Südwest (III) champions: 1978

Regional

- Kreisliga Hessen (I) champions: 1921
- Bezirksliga Rheinhessen-Saar (I) champions: 1927
- Bezirksliga Main-Hessen (Hessen group) (I) champions: 1932, 1933
- South West Cup (Tiers III-VII) winners: 1980, 1982, 1986

Youth

- German under 19 champions: 2009, 2023
- Under 17 Bundesliga South/Southwest champions: 2014

Individual Club Awards

- DFB-Pokal semi-finalists: 2009
- UEFA Fair Play selection: 2005

Reserve team

- Oberliga Südwest (IV) champions: 2003, 2008
- South West Cup winners: 2001, 2002, 2003, 2004, 2005

== Players ==
=== Current squad ===
As of 2 September 2026

No.	Pos.	Nation	Player
1	GK	GER	Alexander Schwolow
2	DF	AUT	Phillipp Mwene
3	DF	PER	Fabio Gruber
4	DF	AUT	Stefan Posch
5	MF	GER	Eric Martel
6	MF	JPN	Kaishū Sano
7	MF	KOR	Lee Jae-sung
8	MF	GER	Paul Nebel
9	FW	GER	Phillip Tietz
10	MF	GER	Nadiem Amiri
11	FW	GHA	Ransford-Yeboah Königsdörffer
15	MF	USA	Lennard Maloney
16	DF	GER	Stefan Bell

No.	Pos.	Nation	Player
17	FW	GER	Benedict Hollerbach
19	DF	FRA	Anthony Caci
20	MF	FIN	Otto Ruoppi
21	DF	GER	Danny da Costa
23	FW	SUR	Sheraldo Becker
24	MF	JPN	Sōta Kawasaki
26	FW	COD	Silas
27	GK	GER	Robin Zentner
30	DF	SUI	Silvan Widmer (captain)
31	DF	GER	Dominik Kohr
39	FW	CIV	Alynho Haïdara
40	GK	GER	Maximilian Kinzig
48	DF	POL	Kacper Potulski

=== Out on loan ===
Note: Flags indicate national team as defined under FIFA eligibility rules; some limited exceptions apply. Players may hold more than one non-FIFA nationality.

No.	Pos.	Nation	Player
—	GK	GER	Lasse Rieß (at Fortuna Düsseldorf until 30 June 2027)
—	DF	AUS	Kasey Bos (at Excelsior until 30 June 2027)
—	DF	AUT	Konstantin Schopp (at TSV Hartberg until 30 June 2027)
—	MF	GER	Daniel Gleiber (at 1. FC Saarbrücken until 30 June 2027)

No.	Pos.	Nation	Player
—	MF	KOR	Hong Hyun-seok (at Midtjylland until 30 June 2027)
—	FW	DEN	William Bøving (at 1. FC Nürnberg until 30 June 2027)
—	FW	GER	Nelson Weiper (at Sturm Graz until 30 June 2027)

== Current coaching staff ==
As of 1 January 2024.

Head coach	(Switzerland) Urs Fischer
Assistant coach	(Austria) Markus Hoffmann (Denmark) Michael Silberbauer (Germany) Sören Hartung
Goalkeeper coach	(Germany) Stephan Kuhnert
Assistant coach/Analysis	(Germany) Jannes Ehresmann (Germany) Sebastian Podsiadly
Performance manager	(Germany) Sven Herzog (Germany) Jonas Grünewald
Rehab coach	(Germany) Axel Busenkell
Team manager	(Germany) Darius Salbert
Integration adviser	(Tunisia) Nejmeddin Daghfous
Medical director physiotherapy	(Germany) Steffen Tröster
Physiotherapist	(Germany) Nico Hölzel (Germany) Stefan Kamilli (Germany) Daniel Henkes
Equipment manager	(Germany) Walter Notter (Germany) Torsten Körner
Doctor	(Germany) Dr. Philipp Appelmann (Germany) Dr. Stefan Mattyasovszky (Germany) Dr. Kathrin Stelzer

== Coaching history ==
- (Hungary) Tibor Hesser (1926–28)
- Atwood (1928–29)
- (Germany) Julius Etz (1929–33)
- (Germany) Paul Oßwald (1933–35)
- (Germany) Helmut Schneider (1946–48)
- (Germany) Berno Wischmann (1950 – October 50)
- (Germany) Hans Geiger (October 1950–52)
- (Germany) Georg Bayerer (1952–53)
- (Hungary) Emil Izsó (1953 – Dec 54)
- (Germany) Gerd Higi (1955–57)
- (Germany) Josef Kretschmann (1957–59)
- (Germany) Heinz Baas (1959–66)
- (Germany) Erich Bäumler (1967–68)
- (Germany) Bernd Hoss (1971–74)
- (Germany) Uwe Klimaschefski (1 July 1974 – 21 September 1974)
- (Germany) Gerd Menne (1 Oct 1974 – 7 December 1975)
- (Germany) Gerd Higi (interim) (5 December 1975 – 31 December 1975)
- (Germany) Horst Hülß (16 January 1976 – 30 June 1980)
- (Germany) Herbert Dörenberg (1980 – March 83)
- (Germany) Lothar Emmerich (March 1983–84)
- (Germany) Horst-Dieter Strich (1984–88)
- (Germany) Horst Hülß (1 July 1988 – 13 February 1989)
- (Germany) Robert Jung (14 February 1989 – 30 June 1992)
- (Croatia) Josip Kuze (1 July 1992 – 15 October 1994)
- (Germany) Hermann Hummels (20 October 1994 – 17 April 1995)
- (Germany) Horst Franz (18 April 1995 – 13 September 1995)
- (Germany) Manfred Lorenz (interim) (14 September 1995 – 23 September 1995)
- (Germany) Wolfgang Frank (25 September 1995 – 2 March 1997)
- (Germany) Manfred Lorenz (interim) (3 March 1997 – 10 March 1997)
- (Germany) Reinhard Saftig (11 March 1997 – 23 August 1997)
- (Germany) Manfred Lorenz (interim) (23 August 1997 – 15 September 1997)
- (Austria) Dietmar Constantini (24 August 1997 – 9 April 1998)
- (Germany) Wolfgang Frank (9 April 1998 – 17 April 2000)
- (Germany) Dirk Karkuth (18 April 2000 – 30 June 2000)
- (Belgium) René Vandereycken (1 July 2000 – 14 November 2000)
- (Germany) Manfred Lorenz (interim) (15 November 2000 – 21 November 2000)
- (Germany) Eckhard Krautzun (21 November 2000 – 28 February 2001)
- (Germany) Jürgen Klopp (28 February 2001 – 30 June 2008)
- (Norway) Jörn Andersen (1 July 2008 – 3 August 2009)
- (Germany) Thomas Tuchel (3 August 2009 – 11 May 2014)
- (Denmark) Kasper Hjulmand (15 May 2014 – 17 February 2015)
- (Switzerland) Martin Schmidt (17 February 2015 – 22 May 2017)
- (Germany) Sandro Schwarz (1 July 2017 – 10 November 2019)
- (Germany) Achim Beierlorzer (18 November 2019 – 28 September 2020)
- (Germany) Jan-Moritz Lichte (28 September 2020 – 28 December 2020)
- (Germany) Jan Siewert (interim) (28 December 2020 – 4 January 2021)
- (Denmark) Bo Svensson (4 January 2021 – 2 November 2023)
- (Germany) Jan Siewert (2 November 2023 – 12 February 2024)
- (Denmark) Bo Henriksen (13 February 2024 – 3 December 2025)
- (Germany) Benjamin Hoffmann (interim) (3 December 2025 – 7 December 2025)
- (Switzerland) Urs Fischer (7 December 2025 – present)

== See also ==
- The Football Club Social Alliance
