= Martin Schmidt (football manager) =

Swiss football manager (born 1967)

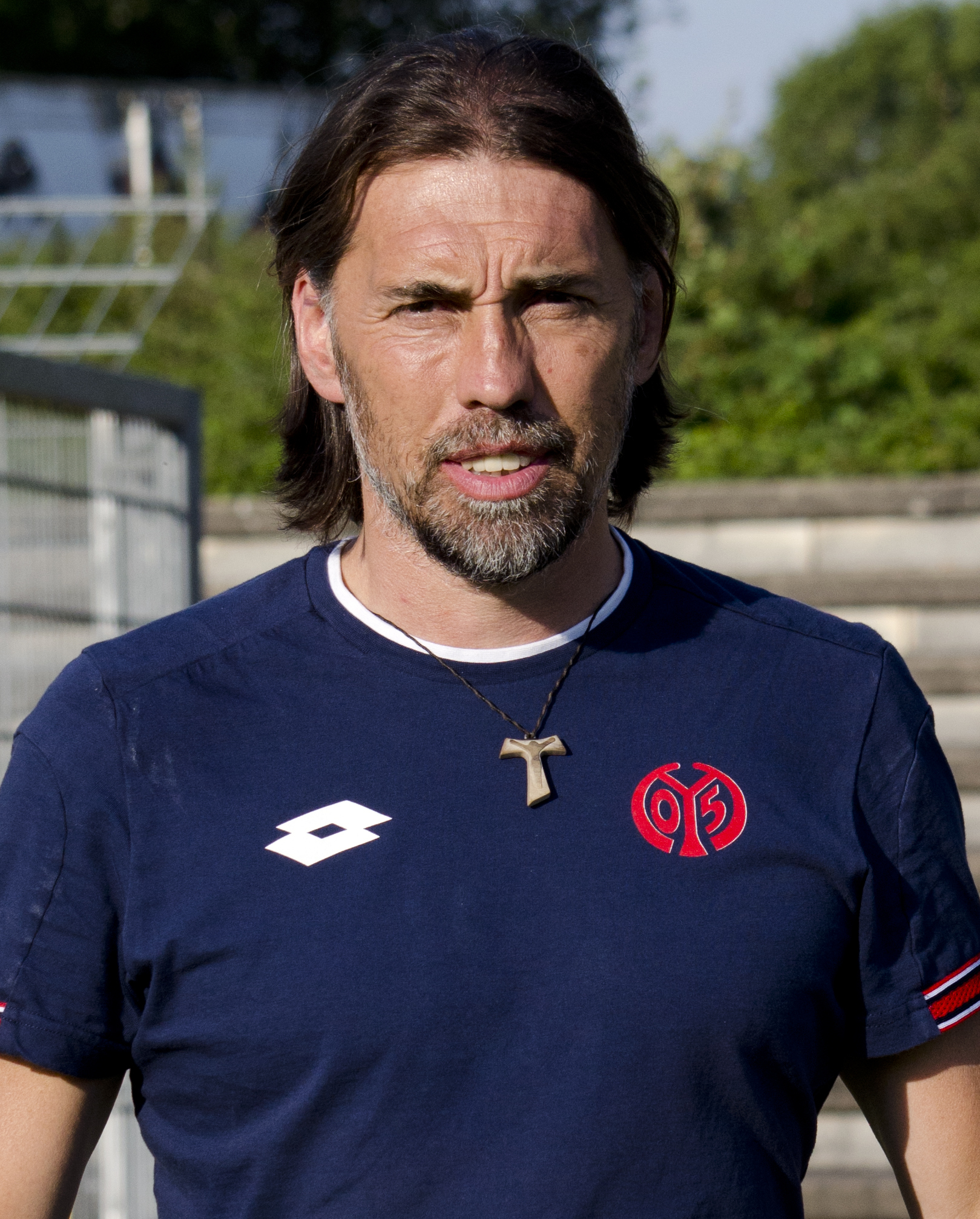
- Schmidt with Mainz 05 in 2015

Personal information
- Date of birth: 12 April 1967 (age 59)
- Place of birth: Naters, Switzerland
- Position: Midfielder

Team information
- Current team: Mainz 05 (sporting director)

Youth career
- 1976–????: Naters

Senior career*
Years	Team	Apps	(Gls)
–1998	Naters		
1998–2001	FC Raron		

Managerial career
- 2003–2008: FC Raron
- 2008–2010: Thun II
- 2010–2015: Mainz 05 II
- 2015–2017: Mainz 05
- 2017–2018: VfL Wolfsburg
- 2019–2020: Augsburg
- * Club domestic league appearances and goals

Martin Schmidt (born 12 April 1967) is a Swiss professional football manager

== Coaching career ==
=== Early career ===
Schmidt began his coaching career as an assistant coach at FC Raron and the youth team of FC Thun. On 30 March 2010, he signed a contract with 1. FSV Mainz 05 II, valid until 2013. He extended his contract until 2015 on 21 February 2013.

=== Mainz 05 ===
Schmidt became new head coach of 1. FSV Mainz 05 on 17 February 2015 after Kasper Hjulmand had been sacked. His contract was extended until 2018 on 21 April 2015. On 22 May 2017, it was announced that his contract with Mainz 05 was dissolved prematurely in accordance with the club's board.

=== VfL Wolfsburg ===
Immediately after Andries Jonker was sacked in September 2017, Schmidt was appointed manager of the club. On 19 February 2018, Schmidt resigned effective immediately.

=== FC Augsburg ===
He was appointed as the new head coach of FC Augsburg on 9 April 2019. He was sacked on 9 March 2020 following a 2–0 defeat to Bayern Munich.

=== Back to Mainz 05 ===
On 28 December 2020 it was confirmed, that Schmidt had returned to 1. FSV Mainz 05, however, this time as a sporting director. He left the club on 7 February 2025.

== Personal life ==
Schmidt was a part-time auto mechanic before becoming manager.

== Managerial statistics ==
As of match played 8 March 2020

Team	From	To	Record					
Team	From	To	G	W	D	L	Win %	Ref.
Mainz 05	17 February 2015	22 May 2017	91	33	21	37	36.26	
VfL Wolfsburg	18 September 2017	19 February 2018	22	5	11	6	22.73	
FC Augsburg	9 April 2019	9 March 2020	32	9	7	16	28.13	
Total			145	47	39	59	32.41	—
