= List of SC Freiburg players =

Top Scorers:

1. Nils Petersen - 64 goals

2. Papiss Demba Cissé - 6 goals

3. Johannes Flum - 5 goals

4. Karim Guédé - 7 goals

5. Mike Frantz - 12 goals

Most Appearances:

1. Andreas Zeyer - 402 appearances

2. Oliver Barth - 42 appearances

3. Amir Abrashi - 75 appearances

4. Timo Reus - 37 appearances

5. Nicolas Höfler - 140 appearances

Youngest Player to Make Debut:

1. Christoph Daferner (aged 18 years, 46 days)

Oldest Player to Make Debut:

1. Alain Ollé Ollé (aged 34 years, 224 days)

Longest Serving Player:

1. Andreas Zeyer (1989-2004) This is a list of footballers who have played for SC Freiburg since the promotion to the 2. Fußball-Bundesliga in 1978.

Appearances are for first-team competitive matches only; Substitute appearances included. Statistics correct as of 25 July 2019.

== List ==
Name	Nationality	from	till	League apps	League goals	Cup apps	Cup goals	EC apps	EC goals
Abdessadki, Yacine	MAR	2008	active	55	5	5	1	0	0
Abrashi, Amir	ALB	2015	active	75	4	3	0	2	0
Akrout, Amir	TUN	2008	2008	13	1	0	0	0	0
Ampomah, Owusu	GHA	2006	2008	7	1	0	0	0	0
Aničić, Michael	SCG	2002	2003	4	0	1	0	0	0
Antar, Roda	LIB	2003	2007	98	26	7	3	0	0
Aogo, Dennis	GER	2004	2008	94	11	4	2	0	0
Backes, Hans-Peter	GER	1979	1980	6	0	0	0	0	0
Bajramović, Zlatan	BIH	2002	2005	72	24	5	2	0	0
Baltes, Benjamin	GER	2005	2006	15	0	3	0	0	0
Banović, Ivica	CRO	2007	active	80	7	5	0	0	0
Barczyk, Mario	GER	1991	1992	13	0	1	0	0	0
Bartels, Rainer	GER	1988	1989	1	0	1	0	0	0
Barth, Oliver	GER	2007	active	42	0	4	0	0	0
Bastians, Felix	GER	2009	active	34	1	2	0	0	0
Baum, Peter	GER	1978	1979	7	0	1	0	0	0
Baumann, Oliver	GER	2009	active	1	0	0	0	0	0
Baya, Zoubeir	TUN	1997	2001	114	21	10	1	0	0
Bechmann, Tommy	DEN	2008	active	49	8	4	0	0	0
Bektasi, Squipon	ALB	2009	active	1	0	0	0	0	0
Ben Slimane, Mehdi	TUN	1997	2002	72	11	7	1	0	0
Benčík, Henrich	SVK	2006	2008	49	9	2	0	0	0
Beneking, Stefan	GER	1992	1997	17	0	1	0	0	0
Bente, Karl-Heinz	GER	1980	1981	16	0	4	1	0	0
Benz, Franz	GER	1981	1983	52	11	1	0	0	0
Berner, Bruno	SUI	2002	2005	76	3	10	1	0	0
Bernhard, Roland	GER	1987	1990	46	1	2	0	0	0
Berry, Austin	CRC	1992	1994	12	1	1	0	0	0
Besl, Hubert	GER	1982	1983	18	1	1	0	0	0
Binder, Reinhard	GER	1978	1984	219	18	14	2	0	0
Birner, Robert	GER	1980	1983	66	24	5	1	0	0
Boiger, Oliver	GER	1987	1988	1	0	0	0	0	0
Bornemann, Andreas	GER	1991; 1999	1998; 2000	8	0	0	0	0	0
Borodyuk, Aleksandr	RUS	1994	1995	20	2	2	0	1	0
Borrello, Brandon	AUS	2018	active	9	0	0	0	0	0
Boškovič, Boško	SVN	1997	1998	6	0	0	0	0	0
Braun, Martin	GER	1990	1995	157	24	9	4	0	0
Briem, Herbert	GER	1983	1984	15	1	2	0	0	0
Bruns, Florian	GER	1999	2003	45	2	7	2	1	0
Buchheit, Marco	GER	1997	1998	2	0	0	0	0	0
Buck, Andreas	GER	1988	1990	65	0	3	0	0	0
Bulut, Onur	TUR	2016	2018	22	0	2	0	0	0
Bührer, Dennis	GER	2004	2007	6	0	1	0	0	0
Bührer, Hans	GER	1978	1979	27	0	2	0	0	0
Burić, Damir	CRO	1992	1999	119	10	11	3	1	0
Bury, Klaus	GER	1978; 1983	1981; 1989	125	6	11	0	0	0
But, Vladimir	RUS	2000	2003	67	7	6	0	6	1
Butscher, Heiko	GER	2007	active	92	8	7	1	0	0
Cafú	CPV	2006	2008	23	1	4	1	0	0
Cairo, Ellery	NED	2003	2005	58	4	5	1	0	0
Caligiuri, Daniel	GER	2009	active	16	0	0	0	0	0
Caligiuri, Paul	USA	1991	1992	18	0	0	0	0	0
Cardoso, Rodolfo Esteban	ARG	1993	1995	63	28	6	1	0	0
Cha, Du-Ri	KOR	2009	2010	23	1	2	0	0	0
Cissé, Papiss Demba	SEN	2010	active	16	6	0	0	0	0
Coulibaly, Boubacar	MLI	2006	2007	3	0	0	0	0	0
Coulibaly, Soumaila	MLI	2000	2007	210	37	18	5	5	1
Crnjanin, Ninoslav	YUG	1978	1980	8	1	2	0	0	0
Daferner, Christoph	GER	2019	active	1	0	0	0	0	0
Dämgen, Michael	GER	1983	1985	70	8	3	2	0	0
Dämpfling, Günter	GER	1979	1982	75	6	4	2	0	0
Decheiver, Harry	NED	1995	1997	41	17	2	1	0	0
Deinert, Hans-Dietmar	GER	1978	1980	48	6	5	2	0	0
Diarra, Boubacar	MLI	1997	2007	228	2	15	0	6	0
Dörflinger, Paul	GER	1978; 1980	1979; 1981	47	24	8	4	0	0
Dorn, Régis	FRA	2000; 2004	2002; 2005	37	6	8	3	0	0
Dräger, Mohamed	TUN	2017	active	2	0	0	0	0	0
Dreyer, Björn	GER	1999	2001	9	1	3	0	0	0
Dum, Manfred	GER	1989	1990	13	0	0	0	0	0
Ehreiser, Thomas	GER	1991	1992	4	0	0	0	0	0
Ehret, Günter	GER	1978	1979	1	0	0	0	0	0
Eisenmenger, Carsten	GER	1991	1993	53	0	0	0	0	0
Fabri, Hans	GER	1982	1983	1	0	0	0	0	0
Fass, Volker	GER	1978	1981	83	0	7	0	0	0
Fincke, Andree	GER	1991	1992	48	15	2	2	0	0
Flekken, Mark	NED	2018	active	1	0	0	0	0	0
Flum, Johannes	GER	2008	active	55	1	4	0	0	0
Fotheringham, Mark	SCO	2005	2006	9	0	3	0	0	0
Frantz, Mike	GER	2014	active	132	12	6	1	2	0
Freund, Oliver	GER	1992	1997	125	8	12	4	0	0
Frey, Dieter	GER	1996	1997	21	1	4	0	0	0
Frontzeck, Michael	GER	1996	1999	61	3	3	0	0	0
Gelfert, Herbert	GER	1978	1979	14	0	1	0	0	0
Gerber, Fabian	GER	2001	2003	12	1	1	1	1	0
Gikiewicz, Rafał	POL	2016	2018	2	0	2	0	0	0
Glockner, Andreas	GER	2008	2010	26	2	3	0	0	0
Gluhačević, Midhat	YUG	1990	1992	20	1	0	0	0	0
Golombek, Andreas	GER	1990	1991	29	3	1	0	0	0
Gondorf, Jérôme	GER	2018	active	25	2	1	0	0	0
Golz, Richard	GER	1998	2006	213	0	20	0	6	0
Grifo, Vincenzo	ITA	2019	2019	16	6	0	0	0	0
Grüninger, Siegfried	GER	1983	1987	134	0	5	0	0	0
Grzelak, Adalbert	GER	1981	1983	43	0	0	0	0	0
Guédé, Karim	SLO	2011	2018	102	7	10	1	2	0
Guezmir, Marouene	TUN	1996	1999	22	1	0	0	0	0
Guié-Mien, Rolf-Christel	CGO	2003	2004	25	0	3	0	0	0
Gulde, Manuel	GER	2016	active	58	2	2	0	0	0
Güldenpennig, Reinhold	GER	1985	1986	3	0	1	0	0	0
Güneş, Ali	TUR	1997; 2007	2000; 2009	85	12	6	0	0	0
Günter, Christian	GER	2012	active	198	2	16	0	7	0
Haas, Michael	GER	1987	1991	118	0	4	0	0	0
Haberer, Janik	GER	2016	active	92	7	6	2	2	0
Hampl, Stefan	GER	1998	2000	6	0	0	0	0	0
Hansen, Niels	GER	2005	2007	38	3	4	0	0	0
Hartenbach, Klemens	GER	1988	1990	10	0	1	0	0	0
Haslbeck, Günter	GER	1987	1988	29	0	1	0	0	0
Hauck, Maximilian	GER	1985	1988	98	7	4	1	0	0
Heidenreich, Maximilian	GER	1992	1997	160	11	11	0	2	0
Heinrich, Jörg	GER	1994	1996	41	7	3	0	1	0
Heintz, Dominique	GER	2018	active	34	1	2	0	0	0
Hermann, Klaus	GER	1988	1989	29	7	1	0	0	0
Hermel, Lars	GER	1998	2006	130	1	11	0	3	0
Herz, Thomas	GER	1978	1979	7	0	0	0	0	0
Higl, Alfons	GER	1987	1989	73	10	3	1	0	0
Hoffmann, Torben	GER	1997	1999	53	4	3	0	0	0
Höfler, Nicolas	GER	2013	active	140	6	11	0	6	0
Höler, Lucas	GER	2018	active	40	5	2	0	0	0
Hollmann, Torge	GER	2003	2005	1	0	0	0	0	0
Hoping, Clemens	GER	1988	1989	5	0	1	0	0	0
Hummel, Dietmar	GER	1993	1999	9	0	2	0	0	0
Iashvili, Alexander	GEO	1997	2007	255	51	19	12	6	0
Ibertsberger, Andreas	AUT	2005	2008	82	1	5	0	0	0
Idrissou, Mohamadou	CMR	2008	2010	74	25	5	1	0	0
Ignjovski, Aleksandar	SRB	2016	2018	19	0	2	0	1	0
Jäger, Jonathan	FRA	2007	active	70	10	4	1	0	0
Janz, Holger	GER	1989	1991	50	16	3	1	0	0
Jüllich, Gernot	GER	1981	1983	51	1	2	0	0	0
Jung, Jörg	GER	1987	1988	8	0	0	0	0	0
Jurčević, Nikola	CRO	1995	1997	44	5	3	1	0	0
Käfer, Martin	GER	1992	1994	12	0	1	0	0	0
Kammerbauer, Patrick	GER	2018	active	1	0	0	0	0	0
Kapustka, Bartosz	POL	2017	2018	7	1	2	0	0	0
Kath, Florian	GER	2013	active	29	1	2	0	0	0
Kaufmann, Andreas	GER	2001; 2005	2002; 2006	5	0	3	0	0	0
Kehl, Sebastian	GER	2000	2001	40	4	4	2	5	2
Kempf, Marc-Oliver	GER	2014	2018	68	7	4	0	1	0
Kent, Ryan	ENG	2017	2018	6	0	0	0	0	0
Kerber, Andreas	GER	1987	1988	4	0	0	0	0	0
Khizaneishvili, Otar	GEO	2005	2008	32	1	2	0	0	0
Klandt, Patric	GER	2015	2018	1	0	2	0	0	0
Kleindienst, Tim	GER	2015	active	33	2	4	0	2	0
Klemensz, Joachim	POL	1989	1991	22	2	0	0	0	0
Koch, Robin	GER	2017	active	50	3	3	0	0	0
Kobiashvili, Levan	GEO	1998	2003	164	31	14	4	6	1
Koejoe, Samuel	NED	2005	2006	36	7	2	2	0	0
Kohl, Ralf	GER	1991	2001	233	15	11	0	2	0
Kondé, Oumar	SUI	1999	2005	115	2	13	0	3	0
Konrad, Manuel	GER	2006	2009	4	0	1	0	0	0
Köppel, Markus	GER	1985	1986	1	0	0	0	0	0
Korell, Steffen	GER	1995	2000	97	4	10	1	0	0
Krajczy, Bernd	GER	1983	1984	17	1	1	0	0	0
Krieg, Martin	GER	1986	1990	45	0	3	0	0	0
Krmaš, Pavel	CZE	2007	active	74	4	4	1	0	0
Kruppa, Henryk	POL	1981	1985	20	0	1	0	0	0
Kruppke, Dennis	GER	2003	2008	85	4	8	1	0	0
Kruse, Benjamin	GER	2001	2003	18	0	1	0	0	0
Kurt, Mustafa	GER	1987	1989	39	8	0	0	0	0
Küber, Lukas	GER	2015	active	47	0	1	0	0	0
Lais, Axel	GER	1984	1987	90	1	3	0	0	0
Langer, Michael	AUT	2008	2010	14	0	0	0	0	0
Lay, Udo	GER	1985	1991	176	9	6	0	0	0
Lehmann, Stephan	SUI	1986	1987	1	0	0	0	0	0
Lienhart, Philipp	AUT	2017	active	25	0	3	0	2	0
Linderer, René	GER	1993	1994	7	0	3	0	0	0
Löffler, Armin	GER	1984	1988	86	10	5	1	0	0
Löw, Joachim	GER	1978; 1982; 1985	1980; 1984; 1989	252	81	12	2	0	0
Löw, Markus	GER	1980	1982	37	4	4	1	0	0
Ludwig, Otmar	GER	1981	1983	41	12	1	0	0	0
Mähn, Karl-Helmut	GER	1983	1985	55	9	3	1	0	0
Maier, Rolf	GER	1980	1992	279	0	10	0	0	0
Majka, Marek	POL	1988	1991	61	21	3	0	0	0
Makiadi, Cedric	COD	2009	active	33	3	2	0	0	0
Mammana, Francesco	ITA	1989	1990	2	0	1	0	0	0
Männer, Jan	GER	2001	2003	25	1	3	2	0	0
Marasek, Stephan	AUT	1996	1997	8	0	3	0	0	0
Marsing, Reinhard	GER	1988	1991	69	1	2	0	0	0
Martinelli, Norbert	GER	1978	1979	6	0	1	0	0	0
Matmour, Karim	ALG	2006	2008	79	10	4	1	0	0
Meffert, Jonas	GER	2016	2018	1	0	2	0	0	0
Mehring, Maximilian	GER	2007	2009	3	0	0	0	0	0
Meisel, Hans	GER	1980; 1984	1983; 1987	130	20	7	0	0	0
Mendy, Jackson	SEN	2009	2010	6	0	0	0	0	0
Menger, Jürgen	GER	1984	1987	68	1	3	0	0	0
Mešić, Mirnes	BIH	2007	2008	16	2	1	0	0	0
Mohamad, Youssef	LIB	2004	2007	87	9	6	1	0	0
Moutas, Dimitrios	GRE	1988	1990	66	20	3	1	0	0
Mujdža, Mensur	BIH	2009	active	14	0	0	0	0	0
Müller, Andreas	GER	1978	1980	3	0	1	0	0	0
Müller, Oliver	GER	1991	1992	0	0	1	0	0	0
Müller, Stefan	GER	1993	2005	203	12	17	1	5	0
Namouchi, Hamed	TUN	2010	2010	1	0	0	0	0	0
Neitzel, Karsten	GER	1994	1997	18	0	3	0	0	0
Niederlechner, Florian	GER	2016	2019	82	25	5	1	2	0
Niedermeier, Georg	GER	2016	2018	6	0	1	0	0	0
Nötzel, Andreas	GER	1985	1986	10	1	1	0	0	0
Nulle, Carsten	GER	2006	2008	11	0	1	0	0	0
Okoroji, Chima	ENG	2018	2019	2	0	0	0	0	0
Olajengbesi, Seyi	NGA	2004	2008	62	1	6	0	0	0
Ollé Ollé, Alain Junior	CMR	2008	active	11	0	0	0	0	0
Pavlin, Miran	SVN	1997	2000	61	5	4	0	0	0
Petersen, Nils	GER	2015	active	131	64	8	10	2	1
Pfahler, Michael	GER	1988	1993	116	9	4	0	0	0
Pilipović, Milorad	YUG	1984	1985	34	10	1	0	0	0
Piller, Robert	GER	1979	1983	138	16	8	2	0	0
Pitroipa, Jonathan	BFA	2004	2008	75	16	4	0	0	0
Pouplin, Simon	FRA	2008	active	63	0	3	0	0	0
Radlspeck, Thomas	GER	1998	1999	1	0	0	0	0	0
Ramdane, Abder	FRA	1999	2005	91	10	5	1	4	0
Rapolder, Uwe	GER	1986	1987	9	0	0	0	0	0
Rath, Thomas	GER	1995	1997	36	2	5	1	1	0
Ravet, Yoric	FRA	2017	active	14	0	3	1	0	0
Reich, Werner	GER	1978; 1981	1980; 1983	46	13	3	1	0	0
Reinard, Julian	GER	2002	2006	11	0	1	0	0	0
Reisinger, Stefan	GER	2009	active	25	3	2	1	0	0
Reiss, Herbert	GER	1980; 1983	1981; 1985	45	2	4	0	0	0
Remark, Thomas	GER	1988	1989	18	8	0	0	0	0
Renner, Michael	GER	1990	1992	9	0	3	0	0	0
Reus, Timo	GER	1997	2005	37	0	1	0	0	0
Riether, Sascha	GER	2002	2007	139	4	13	1	0	0
Rietpietsch, Mike	GER	1998	1999	13	0	1	0	0	0
Rodionov, Vitali	BLR	2009	2009	12	4	1	0	0	0
Roth, Felix	GER	2008	2010	1	0	0	0	0	0
Rraklli, Altin	ALB	1992	1996	86	22	7	3	2	0
Rudolf, Hermann	GER	1983	1985	58	3	1	0	0	0
Ruoff, Volker	GER	1991	1993	38	0	2	0	0	0
Sachs, Gerd	GER	1990	1992	35	0	3	0	0	0
Sallai, Roland	HUN	2012	active	10	2	0	0	0	0
Salz, Manuel	GER	2009	active	3	0	1	0	0	0
Sané, Souleyman	SEN	1985	1988	106	56	6	2	0	0
Sanou, Wilfried	BFA	2003	2008	97	9	6	2	0	0
Schäfer, Oliver	GER	1989	1991	71	0	3	0	0	0
Schaub, Fred	GER	1986	1988	69	18	5	3	0	0
Schlitte, Kevin	GER	2007	2009	47	2	5	0	0	0
Schlotterbeck, Keven	GER	2018	2019	9	0	0	0	0	0
Schlotterbeck, Nico	GER	2017	active	4	0	0	0	0	0
Schlotterbeck, Niels	GER	1990	1991	33	16	1	0	0	0
Schmadtke, Jörg	GER	1993	1997	131	0	12	0	2	0
Schmid, Jonathan	GER	2010; 2019	2015 active	118	20	11	2	2	0
Schmidt, Thomas	GER	1991	1994	92	4	7	0	0	0
Schneider, Georg	GER	1981	1982	13	0	0	0	0	0
Schoppel, Manuel	GER	1999	2002	1	0	0	0	0	0
Schöpperle, Ralf	GER	1982	1985	3	0	1	0	0	0
Schüler, Henry	GER	1979	1982	31	5	4	0	0	0
Schüler, Wolfgang	GER	1979	1980	36	0	0	0	0	0
Schulz, Karl-Heinz	GER	1982	1991	287	20	10	1	0	0
Schulzke, Hans-Peter	GER	1979	1985	162	11	9	0	0	0
Schumann, Daniel	GER	1997	2005	107	3	9	0	0	0
Schuster, Julian	GER	2008	2018	219	17	21	3	2	1
Schwaab, Daniel	GER	2006	2009	91	5	6	1	0	0
Schweizer, Thomas	GER	1986; 1992	1991; 1993	136	30	5	2	0	0
Schwinkendorf, Jörn	GER	1997	1999	26	3	1	0	0	0
Schwolow, Alexander	GER	2012	active	134	0	5	0	2	0
Seeliger, Thomas	GER	1992	1994	64	12	6	1	0	0
Seifert, Jan	GER	1993	1994	1	0	0	0	0	0
Sellimi, Adel	TUN	1998	2003	111	27	7	2	5	1
Seretis, Paschalis	GRE	1993	1997	36	1	1	0	1	0
Siegmund, Thomas	GER	1986	1987	12	0	3	0	0	0
Sierro, Vincent	SUI	2017	2019	4	0	1	0	0	0
Simon, Christian	GER	1990	1994	44	9	4	3	0	0
Söyüncü, Çağlar	TUR	2016	2018	50	1	3	0	2	0
Smukalla, Klemens	GER	1978	1979	9	1	1	0	0	0
Spanring, Martin	GER	1993	1997	92	7	7	3	2	0
Spies, Uwe	GER	1990	1997	189	52	11	1	2	0
Stächelin, Uwe	GER	1983	1986	44	4	3	0	0	0
Staib, Uwe	GER	1988	1989	3	0	0	0	0	0
Stanko, Caleb	USA	2011	2019	11	0	2	0	0	0
Steinkirchner, Alfred	GER	1978	1979	20	0	1	0	0	0
Steinwarz, Klaus	GER	1978	1980	32	0	5	0	0	0
Stenzel, Pascal	GER	2016	active	76	2	5	0	2	0
Sternkopf, Michael	GER	1997	1997	16	0	1	0	0	0
Stetter, Guido	GER	1984	1984	14	1	0	0	0	0
Stickroth, Thomas	GER	1983	1986	90	13	3	0	0	0
Streich, Christian	GER	1987	1988	21	2	1	0	0	0
Sundermann, Axel	GER	1994	1997	66	3	3	1	2	0
Susser, Siegfried	GER	1978	1979	17	8	2	0	0	0
Sutter, Alain	SUI	1995	1997	45	5	3	0	0	0
Tanko, Ibrahim	GHA	2001	2007	106	5	9	1	6	1
Targamadze, David	GEO	2008	2010	8	0	0	0	0	0
Terrazzino, Marco	GER	2012; 2017	2014 active	45	3	3	0	0	0
Tochtermann, Heinz	GER	1979	1982	57	8	4	1	0	0
Todt, Jens	GER	1991	1996	168	29	10	5	2	1
Toprak, Ömer	GER	2007	active	44	4	1	0	0	0
Treuheit, Fritz	GER	1978	1979	10	0	1	0	0	0
Trieb, Martin	GER	1990	1990	14	1	0	0	0	0
Tskitishvili, Levan	GEO	1998	2005	141	9	12	4	5	1
Türker, Suat	TUR	2008	2008	12	1	2	1	0	0
Uzoma, Eke	NGA	2007	2010	54	2	4	0	0	0
Vogel, Thomas	GER	1992	1997	111	1	10	0	2	0
Vujačić, Budumir	YUG	1985	1988	76	4	5	0	0	0
Wagner, Michael	AUT	1996	1997	16	0	2	0	0	0
Waldschmidt, Luca	GER	2018	active	30	9	2	0	0	0
Walke, Alexander	GER	2006	2008	74	0	6	0	0	0
Wassmer, Uwe	GER	1993	1999	118	30	9	2	1	0
Weber, Franz	GER	1984	1989	180	20	8	2	0	0
Weis, Wolfgang	GER	1982	1983	1	0	0	0	0	0
Weißhaupt, Marco	GER	1997	2001	112	25	8	4	0	0
Wendt, Benny	SWE	1985	1985	13	4	0	0	0	0
Wienhold, Günter	GER	1978; 1989	1985; 1989	205	0	14	0	0	0
Willi, Reinhard	GER	1978	1980	13	1	3	1	0	0
Willi, Tobias	GER	1998	2005	114	2	13	0	5	0
Williams, Daniel	GER	2009	active	6	0	0	0	0	0
Wöhrlin, Karl-Heinz	GER	1978	1984	197	5	14	1	0	0
Wormuth, Frank	GER	1982	1983	24	1	1	0	0	0
Zacher, Hans-Peter	GER	1978	1979	15	5	2	1	0	0
Zandi, Ferydoon	IRN	2000	2002	10	0	3	0	0	0
Zeitvogel, Michael	GER	1978	1979	3	0	1	0	0	0
Zele, Gabor	HUN	1978	1986	219	7	11	0	0	0
Zeyer, Andreas	GER	1989; 1999	1997; 2004	402	43	29	3	8	0
Zeyer, Michael	GER	1989	1992	102	9	4	1	0	0
Zitzer, Jürgen	GER	1979	1981	59	9	4	2	0	0
