= 2010–11 SC Freiburg season =

SC Freiburg
2010–11 season
- Chairman: Fritz Keller
- Manager: Robin Dutt
- Stadium: Badenova-Stadion; Freiburg, Germany
- Bundesliga: 9th
- DFB-Pokal: Second round (vs. Energie Cottbus)
- Top goalscorer: League: Papiss Cissé (22); All: Papiss Cissé (24)
- Highest home attendance: 24,000 (10 times)
- Lowest home attendance: 19,200 (vs. Wolfsburg)
| Home colours | Away colours | Third colours |

The 2010–11 SC Freiburg season is the club's 13th season in the Bundesliga, the highest division in German football, and the second consecutive season since promotion in 2009. It is the club's fourth season with Robin Dutt as manager.
The season began on 28 June with a first training session.

== Transfers ==
Freiburg has had a few squad changes over the summer. A total of 11 players left the club over the summer transfer period, most notably Cha Du-ri and Mohamadou Idrissou, who join Celtic and Borussia Mönchengladbach respectively after their contracts had expired. Incoming to the club were Jan Rosenthal from Hannover 96, Maximilian Nicu from Hertha BSC and Zvonko Pamić on loan from Bayer Leverkusen. Additionally, Alain Junior Ollé Ollé returned from his loan spell at Rot Weiss Ahlen, whilst Nicolas Höfler and Danny Williams were moved up from the club's reserve squad. Towards the end of the summer transfer period, the club made multiple further additions by bringing in Kisho Yano and Anton Putsila.

=== Summer transfers ===
In:

| No. | Pos. | Nation | Player |
|---|---|---|---|
| 8 | MF | GER | Jan Rosenthal (from Hannover 96) |
| 10 | MF | ROU | Maximilian Nicu (from Hertha BSC) |
| 14 | MF | CRO | Zvonko Pamić (from Bayer Leverkusen (on loan until 2012)) |
| 17 | MF | CMR | Alain Junior Ollé Ollé (from Rot-Weiss Ahlen (loan return)) |
| 21 | MF | BLR | Anton Putsila (from Dinamo Minsk) |
| 22 | FW | JPN | Kisho Yano (from Albirex Niigata) |
| 28 | MF | GER | Danny Williams (from SC Freiburg II) |
| 31 | MF | GER | Nicolas Höfler (from SC Freiburg II) |

Out:

| No. | Pos. | Nation | Player |
|---|---|---|---|
| 6 | DF | KOR | Cha Du-ri (to Celtic) |
| 8 | FW | CMR | Mohamadou Idrissou (to Borussia Mönchengladbach) |
| 14 | MF | ALG | Hamed Namouchi (to Grenoble) |
| 16 | FW | GER | Felix Roth (to Austria Lustenau) |
| 19 | MF | GER | Andreas Glockner (to 1. FC Heidenheim) |
| 21 | GK | AUT | Michael Langer (to FSV Frankfurt) |
| 25 | DF | GER | Sandro Sirigu (to 1. FC Heidenheim) |
| 30 | MF | GEO | David Targamadze (to Oleksandriya) |
| 39 | DF | FRA | Jackson Mendy (to Grenoble) |
| - | DF | NGR | Eke Uzoma (to 1860 Munich (was already loaned out)) |

=== Winter transfers ===
In:

| No. | Pos. | Nation | Player |
|---|---|---|---|
| 19 | FW | SVK | Erik Jendrišek (from Schalke 04) |

Out:

| No. | Pos. | Nation | Player |
|---|---|---|---|
| 17 | MF | CMR | Alain Junior Ollé Ollé (to Stabæk) |
| 20 | MF | CRO | Ivica Banović (to MSV Duisburg (on loan until end of season)) |
| 35 | DF | SUI | Daniel Sereinig (to Winterthur) |

== Competitions ==
=== Bundesliga ===
==== League table ====
| Pos | Team | Pld | W | D | L | GF | GA | GD | Pts |
|---|---|---|---|---|---|---|---|---|---|
| 7 | 1. FC Kaiserslautern | 34 | 13 | 7 | 14 | 48 | 51 | −3 | 46 |
| 8 | Hamburger SV | 34 | 12 | 9 | 13 | 46 | 52 | −6 | 45 |
| 9 | SC Freiburg | 34 | 13 | 5 | 16 | 41 | 50 | −9 | 44 |
| 10 | 1. FC Köln | 34 | 13 | 5 | 16 | 47 | 62 | −15 | 44 |
| 11 | 1899 Hoffenheim | 34 | 11 | 10 | 13 | 50 | 50 | 0 | 43 |

Source: kicker
Rules for classification: 1) points; 2) goal difference; 3) number of goals scored.

==== Results by round ====
| Round | 1 | 2 | 3 | 4 | 5 | 6 | 7 | 8 | 9 | 10 | 11 | 12 | 13 | 14 | 15 | 16 | 17 | 18 | 19 | 20 | 21 | 22 | 23 | 24 | 25 | 26 | 27 | 28 | 29 | 30 | 31 | 32 | 33 | 34 |
|---|---|---|---|---|---|---|---|---|---|---|---|---|---|---|---|---|---|---|---|---|---|---|---|---|---|---|---|---|---|---|---|---|---|---|
| Ground | H | A | H | A | H | A | H | A | H | A | H | A | H | A | H | H | A | A | H | A | H | A | H | A | H | A | H | A | H | A | H | A | A | H |
| Result | L | W | W | W | L | L | W | L | W | L | W | W | L | L | W | W | T | T | T | W | T | L | W | L | L | L | L | T | W | L | L | W | L | L |
| Position | 14 | 11 | 7 | 4 | 5 | 7 | 5 | 9 | 7 | 10 | 8 | 4 | 6 | 8 | 5 | 5 | 6 | 7 | 7 | 6 | 6 | 6 | 6 | 7 | 8 | 7 | 8 | 8 | 8 | 8 | 8 | 7 | 8 | 9 |

Updated to match(es) played on October 7, 2010. Source:
A = Away; H = Home; W = Win; L = Loss; T = Tie

==== Matches ====
Win Tie Loss

| 21 August 2010 1 | SC Freiburg | 1–3 | FC St. Pauli | badenova-stadion, Freiburg |
| 15:30 CEST | Cissé 78' | Report | Boll 83'; Sukuta-Pasu 89'; Bartels 90+1' | Attendance: 24,000; Referee: Jochen Drees |

| 28 August 2010 2 | 1. FC Nürnberg | 1–2 | SC Freiburg | Nuremberg |
| 15:30 CEST | Ekici (yellow card) 5'; Schieber 14'; Wolf (yellow card) 40' | Report | Cissé 41' (pen.), 53'; Mujdža (yellow card) 78' | Stadium: easyCredit-stadion; Attendance: 36,780; Referee: Tobias Welz |

| 11 September 2010 3 | SC Freiburg | 2–1 | VfB Stuttgart | Freiburg |
| 15:30 CEST | Cissé 58'; Schuster 72'; Abdessadki (yellow card) 89' | Report | Pogrebnyak 27'; Gebhart (yellow card) 75' | Stadium: badenova-stadion Attendance: 23,000; Referee: Peter Sippel |

| 17 September 2010 4 | Eintracht Frankfurt | 0–1 | SC Freiburg | Frankfurt |
| 20:30 CEST | Tzavellas (yellow card) 82' | Report | Abdessadki (yellow card) 45'; Rosenthal 89', (yellow card) 90' | Stadium: Commerzbank-Arena; Attendance: 40,600; Referee: Günter Perl |

| 22 September 2010 5 | SC Freiburg | 1–2 | Schalke 04 | Freiburg |
| 20:00 CEST | Barth (yellow card) 62'; Cissé 69', (yellow card) 90+3'; Schuster (yellow card) 84'; Banović (red card) 90+1' | Report | Rakitić 9'; Matip (yellow card) 39'; Schmitz (yellow card) 52'; Kluge (yellow card) 85'; Huntelaar 87' | Stadium: badenova-stadion Attendance: 24,000; Referee: Felix Zwayer |

| 26 September 2010 6 | VfL Wolfsburg | 2–1 | SC Freiburg | Wolfsburg |
| 15:30 CEST | Grafite 25', 64'; Josué (yellow card) 43' | Report | Cissé 36'; Butscher (yellow card) 63'; Mujdža (yellow card) 78' | Stadium: Volkswagen-Arena; Attendance: 26,204; Referee: Markus Schmidt |

| 2 October 2010 7 | SC Freiburg | 3–2 | 1. FC Köln | Freiburg |
| 15:30 CEST | Rosenthal 4', 11'; Pouplin (yellow card) 31'; Cissé 70' | Report | Lanig (yellow card) 19'; Mohamad (yellow card) 31'; Matuschyk 50', (yellow card) 56'; Brečko (yellow card) 75' | Stadium: badenova-stadion Attendance: 22,100; Referee: Jochen Drees |

| 16 October 2010 8 | Werder Bremen | 2–1 | SC Freiburg | Weserstadion, Bremen |
| 15:30 CEST | Hunt 33'; Almeida 73' | Report | Schuster 62' | Attendance: 34,500; Referee: Babak Rafati |

| 23 October 2010 9 | SC Freiburg | 2–1 | 1. FC Kaiserslautern | badenova-stadion, Freiburg |
| 15:30 CEST | Cissé (yellow card) 27', (goal) 35'; Reisinger 60', (yellow card) 74' | Report | Morávek 8'; Lakić (yellow card) 28' | Attendance: 24,000; Referee: Deniz Aytekin |

| 29 October 2010 10 | Bayern Munich | 4–2 | SC Freiburg | Munich |
| 20:30 CEST | Demichelis 39'; Gómez 61'; Tymoshchuk 72'; Kroos 80' | Report | Putsila (yellow card) 52'; Reisinger 64'; Cissé (yellow card) 74'; Toprak (yellow card) 79'; Braafheid 87' (o.g.) | Stadium: Allianz Arena; Attendance: 69,000; Referee: Peter Gagelmann |

| 6 November 2010 11 | SC Freiburg | 1–0 | Mainz 05 | Freiburg |
| 15:30 CET | Toprak (yellow card) 33'; Putsila (yellow card) 34'; Cissé 64' (pen.) | Report | Bungert (yellow card) 63' | Stadium: badenova-stadion Attendance: 22,400; Referee: Wolfgang Stark |

| 14 November 2010 12 | 1899 Hoffenheim | 0–1 | SC Freiburg | Sinsheim |
| 15:30 CET | | Report | Makiadi (yellow card) 54'; Cissé 90+1' | Stadium: Rhein-Neckar-Arena; Attendance: 30,150; Referee: Felix Zwayer |

| 20 November 2010 13 | SC Freiburg | 1–2 | Borussia Dortmund | Freiburg |
| 15:30 CET | Hummels 27' (o.g.) | Report | Lewandowski 75'; Mujdža 78' (o.g.); Weidenfeller (yellow card) 90' | Stadium: badenova-stadion Attendance: 24,000; Referee: Marco Fritz |

| 27 November 2010 14 | Hannover 96 | 3–0 | SC Freiburg | Hanover |
| 15:30 CET | Schlaudraff 15'; Ya Konan 73'; Hanke 89' | Report | Schuster (yellow card) 36' | Stadium: AWD-Arena; Attendance: 34,108; Referee: Peter Sippel |

| 4 December 2010 15 | SC Freiburg | 1–0 | Hamburger SV | Freiburg |
| 15:30 CET | Cissé 3', (yellow card) 76' | Report | | Stadium: badenova-stadion Attendance: 23,900; Referee: Tobias Welz |

| 12 December 2010 16 | SC Freiburg | 3–0 | Borussia Mönchengladbach | Freiburg |
| 15:30 CET | Cissé 19', 59', (yellow card) 80'; Barth 41' | Report | Schachten (yellow card) 25'; Levels (yellow card) 69' | Stadium: badenova-stadion Attendance: 22,700; Referee: Wolfgang Stark |

| 19 December 2010 17 | Bayer Leverkusen | 2–2 | SC Freiburg | Leverkusen |
| 15:30 CET | Vidal 16' (pen.); Reinartz (yellow card) 32'; Helmes 75'; Barnetta (yellow card) 83'; Kadlec (yellow card) 86' | Report | Rosenthal 24'; Reisinger 65'; Caligiuri (yellow card) 83' | Stadium: BayArena; Attendance: 22,421; Referee: Marc Seemann |

| 15 January 2011 18 | FC St. Pauli | 2–2 | SC Freiburg | Hamburg |
| 15:30 CET | Ebbers 13'; Asamoah 68', (yellow card) 90+2' | Report | Cissé 61', 75'; Putsila (yellow card) 81' | Stadium: Millerntor-Stadion; Attendance: 24,051; Referee: Markus Wingenbach |

| 22 January 2011 19 | SC Freiburg | 1–1 | 1. FC Nürnberg | Freiburg |
| 15:30 CET | Flum 32' | Report | Schieber 56'; Ekici (yellow card) 72' | Stadium: badenova-stadion Attendance: 20,000; Referee: Marco Fritz |

| 30 January 2011 20 | VfB Stuttgart | 0–1 | SC Freiburg | Stuttgart |
| 15:30 CET | | Report | Flum 24'; Putsila (yellow card) 79'; Mujdža (yellow card) 89' | Stadium: Mercedes-Benz Arena; Attendance: 38,600; Referee: Jochen Drees |

| 6 February 2011 21 | SC Freiburg | 0–0 | Eintracht Frankfurt | Freiburg |
| 17:30 CET | | Report | Meier (yellow card) 77'; Franz (yellow card) 80' | Stadium: badenova-stadion Attendance: 21,900; Referee: Florian Meyer |

| 12 February 2011 22 | FC Schalke 04 | 1–0 | SC Freiburg | Gelsenkirchen |
| 15:30 CET | Farfán 49', (yellow card) 50'; Kluge (yellow card) 82' | Report | Bastians (yellow card) 52'; Butscher (yellow card) 74' | Stadium: Veltins-Arena; Attendance: 60,439; Referee: Tobias Welz |

| 19 February 2011 23 | SC Freiburg | 2–1 | VfL Wolfsburg | Freiburg |
| 15:30 CET | Mujdža (yellow card) 31'; Reisinger 43'; Barth (yellow card) 75'; Butscher (yellow card) 89' | Report | Helmes 28' | Stadium: badenova-stadion Attendance: 21,000; Referee: Robert Hartmann |

| 26 February 2011 24 | 1. FC Köln | 1–0 | SC Freiburg | Cologne |
| 15:30 CET | Lanig (yellow card) 29'; Podolski 89'; Novaković (yellow card) 90' | Report | Cissé (yellow card) 40'; Abdessadki (yellow card) 61'; Mujdža (yellow card) 66' | Stadium: RheinEnergieStadion; Attendance: 45,500; Referee: Christian Dingert |

| 6 March 2011 25 | SC Freiburg | 1–3 | Werder Bremen | Freiburg |
| 15:30 CET | Cissé 49' (pen.), (yellow card) 90+4'; Abdessadki (yellow card) 58'; Putsila (yellow card) 78' | Report | Wagner 12', (yellow card) 41'; Pasanen (yellow card) 25'; Borowski (yellow card) 49'; Silvestre (yellow card) 68'; Pizarro 76', (yellow card) 90+1'; Marin 90+3' | Stadium: badenova-stadion Attendance: 24,000; Referee: Knut Kircher |

| 12 March 2011 26 | 1. FC Kaiserslautern | 2–1 | SC Freiburg | Kaiserslautern |
| 15:30 CET | Nemec 34'; Hoffer 90+2' | Report | Nemec 21' (o.g.) | Stadium: Fritz-Walter-Stadion; Attendance: 41,015; Referee: Peter Sippel |

| 19 March 2011 27 | SC Freiburg | 1–2 | Bayern Munich | Freiburg |
| 15:30 CET | Cissé 17'; Schuster (yellow card) 30'; Reisinger (yellow card) 87' | Report | Gómez 9'; Ribéry 88' | Stadium: badenova-stadion Attendance: 24,000; Referee: Peter Gagelmann |

| 2 April 2011 28 | Mainz 05 | 1–1 | SC Freiburg | Mainz |
| 15:30 CEST | Fuchs (yellow card) 37'; Allagui 74' | Report | Cissé 1'; Mujdža (yellow card) 29'; Flum (yellow card) 60'; Putsila (yellow card) 69' | Stadium: Stadion am Bruchweg; Attendance: 20,000; Referee: Markus Schmidt |

| 9 April 2011 29 | SC Freiburg | 3–2 | 1899 Hoffenheim | Freiburg |
| 15:30 CEST | Schuster 23'; Krmaš (red card) 33'; Cissé (yellow card) 51', (goal) 60' (pen.); Butscher 78' | Report | Ibišević (yellow card) 16', (goal) 34' (pen.); Rudy (yellow card) 39'; Babel 42'; Beck (yellow card) 52'; Braafheid (yellow card) 60'; Ibertsberger (yellow card) 77' | Stadium: badenova-stadion Attendance: 24,000; Referee: Wolfgang Stark |

| 17 April 2011 30 | Borussia Dortmund | 3–0 | SC Freiburg | Dortmund |
| 17:30 CEST | Götze 23'; Hummels (yellow card) 28'; Lewandowski 43'; Großkreutz 78' | Report | Caligiuri (yellow card) 26'; Barth (yellow card) 57' | Stadium: Signal Iduna Park; Attendance: 80,720; Referee: Felix Zweyer |

| 21 April 2011 31 | SC Freiburg | 1–3 | Hannover 96 | Freiburg |
| 20:30 CEST | Rosenthal 79' | Report | Schulz (yellow card) 11'; Abdellaoue 24'; Schlaudraff 31'; Rausch 58'; Stindl (yellow card) 83' | Stadium: badenova-stadion Attendance: 24,000; Referee: Markus Wingenbach |

| 30 April 2011 32 | Hamburger SV | 0–2 | SC Freiburg | Hamburg |
| 15:30 CEST | Jarolím (yellow card) 45'; Zé Roberto (yellow card) 69'; Aogo (yellow card) 84' | Report | Cissé 16', 88'; Mujdža (yellow card) 76' | Stadium: Imtech Arena; Attendance: 52,985; Referee: Guido Winkmann |

| 7 May 2011 33 | Borussia Mönchengladbach | 2–0 | SC Freiburg | Mönchengladbach |
| 15:30 CEST | Daems (yellow card) 56'; Idrissou (yellow card) 59'; Hanke 80'; Reus 82' | Report | Mujdža (yellow card) 64'; Toprak (yellow card) 55' (yellow-red card) 66' | Stadium: Borussia-Park; Attendance: 49,072; Referee: Michael Weiner |

| 14 May 2011 34 | SC Freiburg | 0–1 | Bayer Leverkusen | Freiburg |
| 15:30 CEST | | Report | Balitsch 45'; Augusto (yellow card) 57' | Stadium: badenova-stadion Attendance: 24,000; Referee: Felix Zwayer |

=== DFB-Pokal ===
==== 1st round ====
| 14 August 2010 | FC Oberneuland | 0–1 | SC Freiburg | Bremen |
| 15:30 CEST | Mandić (yellow card) 74' | Report | Cissé 13'; Bechmann (yellow card) | Stadium: Sportpark Vinnenweg; Attendance: 1,500; Referee: Bibiana Steinhaus |

==== 2nd round ====
| 26 October 2010 | Energie Cottbus | 2–1 | SC Freiburg | Cottbus |
| 20:30 CEST | Kruska 38' (pen.); Hünemeier (yellow card) 63'; Jula 81' | | Cissé (yellow card) 63', (goal) 67' | Stadium: Stadion der Freundschaft; Attendance: 8,050; Referee: Thorsten Kinhöfer |

== Players ==
=== Current squad ===
| No. | Pos | Nat | Player | Total | | Bundesliga | | DFB-Pokal | |
| No. | Pos | Nat | Player | Apps | Goals | Apps | Goals | Apps | Goals |
|---|---|---|---|---|---|---|---|---|---|
| 1 | GK | (France) FRA | Simon Pouplin | 5 | 0 | 4 | 0 | 1 | 0 |
| 2 | DF | (Czech Republic) CZE | Pavel Krmaš | 6 | 0 | 6 | 0 | 0 | 0 |
| 3 | DF | (Germany) GER | Felix Bastians | 31 | 0 | 29 | 0 | 2 | 0 |
| 5 | DF | (Germany) GER | Heiko Butscher | 26 | 1 | 25 | 1 | 1 | 0 |
| 6 | MF | (Morocco) MAR | Yacine Abdessadki | 22 | 0 | 21 | 0 | 1 | 0 |
| 7 | MF | (Democratic Republic of the Congo) COD | Cédric Makiadi | 35 | 0 | 34 | 0 | 1 | 0 |
| 8 | MF | (Germany) GER | Jan Rosenthal | 23 | 5 | 22 | 5 | 1 | 0 |
| 9 | FW | (Senegal) SEN | Papiss Cissé | 34 | 24 | 32 | 22 | 2 | 2 |
| 10 | MF | (Romania) ROU | Maximilian Nicu | 24 | 0 | 23 | 0 | 1 | 0 |
| 11 | MF | (France) FRA | Jonathan Jäger | 13 | 0 | 12 | 0 | 1 | 0 |
| 13 | FW | (Denmark) DEN | Tommy Bechmann | 1 | 0 | 0 | 0 | 1 | 0 |
| 14 | MF | (Croatia) CRO | Zvonko Pamić | 2 | 0 | 2 | 0 | 0 | 0 |
| 15 | DF | (Germany) GER | Oliver Barth | 31 | 1 | 29 | 1 | 2 | 0 |
| 17 | MF | (Cameroon) CMR | Alain Junior Ollé Ollé | 0 | 0 | 0 | 0 | 0 | 0 |
| 18 | MF | (Germany) GER | Johannes Flum | 12 | 2 | 12 | 2 | 0 | 0 |
| 19 | FW | (Slovakia) SVK | Erik Jendrišek | 8 | 0 | 8 | 0 | 0 | 0 |
| 20 | MF | (Croatia) CRO | Ivica Banović | 2 | 0 | 2 | 0 | 0 | 0 |
| 21 | MF | (Belarus) BLR | Anton Putsila | 26 | 0 | 25 | 0 | 1 | 0 |
| 22 | FW | (Japan) JPN | Kisho Yano | 15 | 0 | 15 | 0 | 0 | 0 |
| 23 | MF | (Germany) GER | Julian Schuster | 28 | 3 | 26 | 3 | 2 | 0 |
| 24 | DF | (Bosnia and Herzegovina) BIH | Mensur Mujdža | 34 | 0 | 32 | 0 | 2 | 0 |
| 26 | GK | (Germany) GER | Manuel Salz | 0 | 0 | 0 | 0 | 0 | 0 |
| 27 | FW | (Germany) GER | Stefan Reisinger | 23 | 4 | 22 | 4 | 1 | 0 |
| 28 | MF | (Germany) GER | Danny Williams | 9 | 0 | 7 | 0 | 2 | 0 |
| 31 | MF | (Germany) GER | Nicolas Höfler | 0 | 0 | 0 | 0 | 0 | 0 |
| 32 | MF | (France) FRA | Jonathan Schmid | 1 | 0 | 1 | 0 | 0 | 0 |
| 34 | FW | (Albania) ALB | Scipon Bektasi | 1 | 0 | 1 | 0 | 0 | 0 |
| 35 | DF | (Switzerland) SUI | Daniel Sereinig | 3 | 0 | 2 | 0 | 1 | 0 |
| 37 | GK | (Germany) GER | Oliver Baumann | 31 | 0 | 30 | 0 | 1 | 0 |
| 40 | MF | (Germany) GER | Daniel Caligiuri | 25 | 0 | 23 | 0 | 2 | 0 |
| 58 | DF | (Germany) GER | Ömer Toprak | 25 | 0 | 24 | 0 | 1 | 0 |

=== Goals ===
(League only)

==== Scorers ====
22 Goals

Papiss Cissé

5 Goals

Jan Rosenthal

4 Goals

Stefan Reisinger

3 Goals

Julian Schuster

2 Goals

Johannes Flum

1 Goal

Oliver Barth
Heiko Butscher

Own Goals for

Edson Braafheid (Bayern Munich)
Mats Hummels (Borussia Dortmund)
Adam Nemec (1. FC Kaiserslautern)

Own Goals against

Mensur Mujdža (vs. Borussia Dortmund)

==== Assists ====
8 Assists

Felix Bastians

5 Assists

Maximilian Nicu
Stefan Reisinger

4 Assists

Cédric Makiadi

3 Assists

Julian Schuster

2 Assists

Heiko Butscher
Daniel Caligiuri
Anton Putsila

1 Assist

Oliver Barth
Oliver Baumann
Papiss Cissé
Jonathan Jäger
Erik Jendrišek
Kisho Yano

=== Bookings ===
(League only)

==== Yellow cards ====
8 Yellow Cards

Papiss Cissé
Mensur Mujdža

6 Yellow Cards

Anton Putsila

4 Yellow Cards

Yacine Abdessadki

3 Yellow Cards

Oliver Barth
Heiko Butscher
Julian Schuster

2 Yellow Cards

Daniel Caligiuri
Stefan Reisinger
Ömer Toprak

1 Yellow Card

Felix Bastians
Johannes Flum
Cédric Makiadi
Simon Pouplin
Jan Rosenthal

==== Red cards ====
1 Red Card

Ivica Banović (vs. Schalke 04)
Pavel Krmaš (vs. 1899 Hoffenheim)
Ömer Toprak (vs. Borussia Mönchengladbach)

== Management and coaching staff ==
Since the beginning of the 2007–08 season Robin Dutt is the manager of SC Freiburg.

| Position | Staff |
|---|---|
| Manager | Robin Dutt |
| Assistant manager | Damir Burić |
| Assistant manager | Christian Streich |
| Assistant manager | Patrick Baier |
| Goalkeeping coach | Marco Langner |
| Athletic Trainer | Simon Ickert |
| Sporting Director | Dirk Dufner |
| Leading physician | Andreas Aust |
| Physiotherapist | Uwe Vetter |
| Physiotherapist | Markus Behrens |
| Bus Driver | Stefan Spohn |

On 20 March 2011, it was announced that Robin Dutt would be leaving SC Freiburg to join Bayer Leverkusen as coach at the end of the season. Marcus Sorg will replace Dutt for the 2011–12 season.

== Kits ==
| Home | Away | Away Alternate | Away Alt. 2 | Third | Third Alternate | Third Alt. 2 |
