= 2012–13 SC Freiburg season =

SC Freiburg
2012–13 season
- Chairman: Fritz Keller
- Manager: Christian Streich
- Bundesliga: 5th
- DFB-Pokal: Semi-finals
- Top goalscorer: League: Jonathan Schmid; Max Kruse (11 each); All: Jonathan Schmid; Max Kruse (12 each)
Home colours	Away colours	Third colours

The 2012–13 SC Freiburg season is the 109th season in the club's football history. In 2012–13 the club plays in the Bundesliga, the top tier of German football. It is the club's fourth consecutive season in this league, having been promoted from the 2. Bundesliga at the conclusion of the 2008–09 season.

The club also takes part in the 2012–13 edition of the DFB-Pokal, the German Cup, where it reached the semi-final stage after defeating fellow Bundesliga side Mainz 05 1–2 after extra time on 26 February 2013. They then lost to VfB Stuttgart 2–1 in Stuttgart. They also qualified for the group stage of the 2013–14 UEFA Europa League.

== Matches ==
=== Legend ===
Win Draw Loss Postponed

=== Friendly matches ===
30 June 2012	SV Zimmern (Germany)	2–4	(Germany) SC Freiburg	Zimmern unter der Burg
18:00 CEST	Pallacks 64' (pen.); Rümpe 90'	Report (in German)	Dembélé 6'; Caligiuri 48'; Mounir Bouziane 73', 77'	Stadium: Hauptspielfeld Zimmern; Attendance: 2,200; Referee: Rommel (Stockach)

7 July 2012	Zürich (Switzerland)	4–2	(Germany) SC Freiburg	Stäfa
15:00 CEST	Pedro Henrique 11'; Gavranović 42' (pen.); Chermiti 45' (pen.); Béda 72'	Report (in German)	Schuster 15' (pen.); Caligiuri 63' (pen.)	Stadium: Frohberg; Attendance: 1,752; Referee: Daniel Wermelinger

10 July 2012	Offenburger FV (Germany)	5–0	(Germany) SC Freiburg	Offenburg
18:30 CEST		Report (in German)	Diagne 9'; Jendrišek 50', 87'; Putsila 61'; Terrazino 72'	Stadium: Karl-Heitz-Stadion; Attendance: 2,430

25 July 2012	Vaduz (Liechtenstein)	1–2	(Germany) SC Freiburg	Schruns
18:00 CEST	Amin Tighazoui 25'	Report (in German)	Kruse 9'; Dembélé 25'	Stadium: Sportanlage Wagenweg; Attendance: 500

3 August 2012 Kaiserstuhl Cup	SC Freiburg (Germany)	3–3	(Germany) Hessen Kassel	Bahlingen
19:00 CEST	Calvente 27'; Santini 65', 71'	Report (in German)	Sebastian Schmeer 20', 64'; Nico Hammann 73'	Stadium: Kaiserstuhlstadion; Attendance: 2,800

4 August 2012 Kaiserstuhl Cup	SC Freiburg (Germany)	1–1	(France) Sochaux	Bahlingen
18:00 CEST	Schuster 70'	Report (in German)	Privat 10'	Stadium: Kaiserstuhlstadion; Attendance: 2,750

=== Bundesliga ===
==== League table ====
Pos	Team	Pld	W	D	L	GF	GA	GD	Pts	Qualification or relegation
3	Bayer Leverkusen	34	19	8	7	65	39	+26	65	Qualification for the Champions League group stage
4	Schalke 04	34	16	7	11	58	50	+8	55	Qualification for the Champions League play-off round
5	SC Freiburg	34	14	9	11	45	40	+5	51	Qualification for the Europa League group stage
6	Eintracht Frankfurt	34	14	9	11	49	46	+3	51	Qualification for the Europa League play-off round
7	Hamburger SV	34	14	6	14	42	53	−11	48	

Source: Bundesliga.de, kicker.de
Rules for classification: 1) points; 2) goal difference; 3) number of goals scored.

==== Matches ====
25 August 2012 1	SC Freiburg	1–1	Mainz 05	Freiburg
15:30 CEST	Kruse 49'	Report (in German)	Ivanschitz 65' (pen.); N. Müller (yellow card) 86'; Kirchhoff (yellow card) 89'	Stadium: Mage Solar Stadion; Attendance: 22,500; Referee: Deniz Aytekin (Oberasbach)

1 September 2012 2	Bayer Leverkusen	2–0	SC Freiburg	Leverkusen
15:30 CEST	Castro 8'; Wollscheid 54'; Reinartz (yellow card) 77'	Report (in German)	Guédé (yellow card) 79'	Stadium: BayArena; Attendance: 23,635; Referee: Florian Meyer (Burgdorf)

16 September 2012 3	SC Freiburg	5–3	1899 Hoffenheim	Freiburg
15:30 CEST	Guédé 17'; Kruse 27'; Sorg (yellow card) 45'; Schuster (yellow card) 63'; Diagne 68'; Makiadi 83'; Freis 87'	Report (in German)	Delpierre 2', (yellow card) 51'; Ochs (yellow card) 30'; Rudy (yellow card) 45'; Vukčević 57'; Usami 76'; Williams (yellow card) 82'	Stadium: Mage Solar Stadion; Attendance: 22,800; Referee: Felix Zwayer (Berlin)

22 September 2012 4	Fortuna Düsseldorf	0–0	SC Freiburg	Düsseldorf
15:30 CEST	Levels (yellow card) 49'; Bellinghausen (yellow card) 90'	Report (in German)	Mujdža (yellow card) 90'; Flum (yellow card) 90+1'	Stadium: Esprit Arena; Attendance: 26,862; Referee: Bastian Dankert (Rostock)

26 September 2012 5	SC Freiburg	1–2	Werder Bremen	Freiburg
20:00 CEST	Diagne (yellow card) 11'; Schmid 36'; Caligiuri (yellow card) 67'	Report (in German)	Akpala 48', (yellow card) 64'; Junuzović (yellow card) 55'; Hunt 59'; Arnautović (yellow card) 90+3'; Mielitz (yellow card) 90+4'	Stadium: Mage Solar Stadion; Attendance: 23,000; Referee: Thomas Kinhöfer (Herne)

30 September 2012 6	Eintracht Frankfurt	2–1	SC Freiburg	Frankfurt
15:30 CEST	Meier 68', 73'; Schwegler (yellow card) 75'	Report (in German)	Makiadi (yellow card) 15'; Schuster (yellow card) 40'; M. Kruse 50'; Caligiuri (yellow card) 88'; Guédé (red card)	Stadium: Commerzbank-Arena; Attendance: 49,300; Referee: Felix Brych (Munich)

6 October 2012 7	SC Freiburg	3–0	1. FC Nürnberg	Freiburg
15:30 CEST	Makiadi 36'; Mujdža (yellow card) 37'; Jendrisek (yellow card) 60'; Schuster (yellow card) 86'; Caligiuri 90+2' (pen.); Terrazzino 90+3'	Report (in German)	Pinola (yellow card) 35'; R. Schäfer (yellow card) 79'; Chandler (yellow card) 90+1'	Stadium: Mage Solar Stadion; Attendance: 22,800; Referee: Michael Weiner (Giesen)

20 October 2012 8	VfL Wolfsburg	0–2	SC Freiburg	Wolfsburg
15:30 CEST	Naldo (yellow card) 40'	Report (in German)	Mujdža (yellow card) 12'; Caligiuri 40' (pen.); Schuster 84'; Diagne (yellow card) 86'	Stadium: Volkswagen Arena; Attendance: 25,080; Referee: Robert Hartmann (Wangen)

27 October 2012 9	SC Freiburg	0–2	Borussia Dortmund	Freiburg
15:30 CEST	Caligiuri (yellow card) 73'	Report (in German)	Kehl (yellow card) 39'; Subotić 54', (yellow card) 79'; Götze 83'; Gündoğan (yellow card) 84'	Stadium: Mage Solar Stadion; Attendance: 24,000; Referee: Marco Fritz (Korb)

3 November 2012 10	Borussia Mönchengladbach	1–1	SC Freiburg	Mönchengladbach
15:30 CET	Stranzl (yellow card) 9'; De Camargo 49'	Report (in German)	Caligiuri 77' (pen.)	Stadium: Borussia-Park; Attendance: 47,673; Referee: Wolfgang Stark (Ergolding)

10 November 2012 11	SC Freiburg	0–0	Hamburger SV	Freiburg
15:30 CET	Caligiuri (yellow card) 26'; Schuster (yellow card) 90+2'	Report (in German)	Scharner (yellow card) 10' (yellow-red card) 35'; Van der Vaart (yellow card) 40'; Badelj (yellow card) 54'; Adler (yellow card) 90+2'	Stadium: Mage Solar Stadion; Attendance: 24,000; Referee: Günter Perl (Pullach)

17 November 2012 12	Hannover 96	1–2	SC Freiburg	Hannover
15:30 CET	Abdellaoue 33' (pen.); Huszti (yellow card) 73'; Sobiech (yellow card) 74'	Report (in German)	Schmid 11'; Rosenthal 56'; Mujdža (yellow card) 73'	Stadium: AWD-Arena; Attendance: 43,800; Referee: Deniz Aytekin (Oberasbach)

25 November 2012 13	SC Freiburg	3–0	VfB Stuttgart	Freiburg
15:30 CET	Rosenthal 22'; Krmaš 67'; Kruse 73'; Guédé (yellow card) 90'; Mujdža (yellow card) 90+1'	Report (in German)	Okazaki (yellow card) 27'; Rodríguez (yellow card) 71'; Molinaro (yellow card) 89'	Stadium: Mage Solar Stadion; Attendance: 24,000; Referee: Tobias Welz (Wiesbaden)

28 November 2012 14	SC Freiburg	0–2	Bayern Munich	Freiburg
20:00 CET	Diagne (red card) 18'; Caligiuri (yellow card) 90+4'	Report (in German)	Müller 12' (pen.); Neuer (yellow card) 74'; Tymoshchuk 79'	Stadium: Mage Solar Stadion; Attendance: 24,000; Referee: Florian Meyer (Burgdorf)

1 December 2012 15	FC Augsburg	1–1	SC Freiburg	Augsburg
15:30 CET	Werner 9'; Callsen-Bracker (yellow card) 11'; Koo (yellow card) 40'; Klavan (yellow card) 51'	Report (in German)	Mujdža (yellow card) 15'; Guédé (yellow card) 27'; Schmid 28'; Santini (yellow card) 45+2'; Schuster (yellow card) 59'	Stadium: SGL arena Attendance: 27,144; Referee: Christian Dingert (Thallichtenberg)

8 December 2012 16	SC Freiburg	1–0	Greuther Fürth	Freiburg
15:30 CET	Caligiuri 15'; Sorg (yellow card) 47'; Günter (yellow card) 84'	Report (in German)	Kleine (yellow card) 7'; Asamoah (yellow card) 33'; Rahman (yellow card) 59'; Nehrig (yellow card) 78'	Stadium: Mage Solar Stadion; Attendance: 22,600; Referee: Knut Kircher (Rottenburg

15 December 2012 17	Schalke 04	1–3	SC Freiburg	Gelsenkirchen
18:30 CET	Farfán 20'; Holtby 28'; Huntelaar (yellow card) 76' (yellow-red card) 82'	Report (in German)	Rosenthal 26', 61', (yellow card) 80' (yellow-red card) 81'; Schmid 32'	Stadium: Veltins-Arena; Attendance: 60,620; Referee: Tobias Stieler (Obertshausen)

19 January 2012 18	Mainz 05	0–0	SC Freiburg	Mainz
15:30 CET	Baumgartlinger (yellow card) 23'; Svensson (yellow card) 75'; Parker (yellow card) 86' (yellow-red card) 89'	Report (in German)	Guédé (yellow card) 16'; Krmaš (yellow card) 45+1'	Stadium: Coface Arena; Attendance: 27,519; Referee: Felix Zwayer (Berlin)

26 January 2012 19	SC Freiburg	0–0	Bayer Leverkusen	Freiburg
18:30 CET	Krmaš (yellow card) 35'	Report (in German)	Wollscheid (yellow card) 37'; Boenisch (yellow card) 41'	Stadium: Mage Solar Stadion; Attendance: 22,500; Referee: Felix Brych (Munich)

2 February 2013 20	1899 Hoffenheim	2–1	SC Freiburg	Sinsheim
15:30 CET	Volland 10', 27'; Beck (yellow card) 28'; Polanski (yellow card) 65'; Firmino (yellow card) 83'	Report (in German)	Kruse 4'; Hedenstad (yellow card) 45'; Schuster (yellow card) 90+2'	Stadium: Rhein-Neckar-Stadion; Attendance: 24,000; Referee: Robert Hartmann (Wangen)

10 February 2013 21	SC Freiburg	1–0	Fortuna Düsseldorf	Freiburg
17:30 CET	Schuster (yellow card) 54'; Krmaš 87'	Report (in German)	Balogun (yellow card) 51'; Lambertz (yellow card) 55'; Bodzek (yellow card) 90+1'	Stadium: Mage Solar Stadion; Attendance: 21,200; Referee: Jochen Drees (Münster-Sarmsheim)

16 February 2013 22	Werder Bremen	2–3	SC Freiburg	Bremen
15:30 CET	Petersen 39', 64'	Report (in German)	Kruse 36'; Caligiuri 55' (pen.); Ginter 70'; Makiadi (yellow card) 78'	Stadium: Weserstadion; Attendance: 38,498; Referee: Peter Sippel (Munich)

22 February 2013 23	SC Freiburg	0–0	Eintracht Frankfurt	Freiburg
20:30 CET	Caligiuri (yellow card) 44'	Report (in German)	Matmour (yellow card) 45+1'; Jung (yellow card) 60'; Schwegler (yellow card) 87'	Stadium: Mage Solar Stadion; Attendance: 23,400; Referee: Peter Gagelmann (Bremen)

2 March 2013 24	1. FC Nürnberg	1–1	SC Freiburg	Nuremberg
15:30 CET	Simons 33' (pen.); Frantz (yellow card) 73'; Polter (yellow card) 90+4'	Report (in German)	Makiadi (yellow card) 44'; Caligiuri (yellow card) 60'; Schmid 83'	Stadium: Grundig-Stadion; Attendance: 38,188; Referee: Felix Zwayer (Berlin)

9 March 2013 25	SC Freiburg	2–5	VfL Wolfsburg	Freiburg
15:30 CET	Kruse 2'; Krmaš (yellow card) 15'	Report	Makiadi 7' (o.g.); Vieirinha 16'; Olić (yellow card) 19', (goal) 22'; Polák (yellow card) 57'; Diego (yellow card) 78', (goal) 90+3'; Benaglio (yellow card) 90+1'	Stadium: Mage Solar Stadion; Attendance: 22,900; Referee: Markus Schmidt

16 March 2013 26	Borussia Dortmund	5–1	SC Freiburg	Dortmund
15:30 CET	Lewandowski 41', 45+1'; Şahin 44', 72'; Subotić (yellow card) 74'; Bittencourt 78'	Report	Schmid 28'; Schuster (yellow card) 40'; Mujdža (yellow card) 79'	Stadium: Westfalenstadion; Attendance: 80,645; Referee: Michael Weiner

30 March 2013 27	SC Freiburg	2–1	Borussia Mönchengladbach	Freiburg
15:30 CET	Caligiuri (yellow card) 40'; Kruse 69', 90+2'	Report	Daems (yellow card) 27'; Stranzl (yellow card) 42'	Stadium: Mage Solar Stadion; Attendance: 24,000; Referee: Günter Perl

6 April 2013 28	Hamburger SV	0–1	SC Freiburg	Hamburg
18:30 CEST	Arslan (yellow card) 22'; Son (yellow card) 53'	Report	Schmid 69'	Stadium: Imtech Arena; Attendance: 53,021; Referee: Dr. Felix Brych

13 April 2013 29	SC Freiburg	3–1	Hannover 96	Freiburg
20:30	Schulz 24' (o.g.); Kruse 43'; Schmid 74'; Schuster (yellow card) 82'	Report	Schulz (yellow card) 27'; Stindl (yellow card) 31'; Rausch 36'	Stadium: Mage Solar Stadion; Attendance: 24,000; Referee: Deniz Aytekin

20 April 2013 30	VfB Stuttgart	2–1	SC Freiburg	Stuttgart
15:30 CEST	Gentner 33'; Ibišević 42'	Report	Schuster (yellow card) 27'; Ginter (yellow card) 67'; Höhn (yellow card) 69'; Santini 88'	Stadium: Mercedes-Benz Arena; Attendance: 50,600; Referee: Thorsten Kinhöfer

27 April 2013 31	Bayern Munich	1–0	SC Freiburg	Munich
15:30 CEST	Can 35'; Tymoshchuk (yellow card) 46'	Report	Caligiuri (yellow card) 68'	Stadium: Allianz Arena; Attendance: 71,000; Referee: Christian Dingert

5 May 2013 32	SC Freiburg	2–0	FC Augsburg	Freiburg
15:30 CEST	Diagne (yellow card) 18'; Sorg (yellow card) 22'; Makiadi 31'; Schmid 61'; Ginter (yellow card) 65'	Report	Callsen-Bracker (yellow card) 79'; Hain (yellow card) 90+1'	Stadium: Mage Solar Stadion; Attendance: 24,000; Referee: Felix Zwayer

11 May 2013 33	Greuther Fürth	1–2	SC Freiburg	Fürth
15:30 CEST	Zimmermann 3'	Report	Caligiuri (yellow card) 33'; Schmid 69'; Schuster (yellow card) 74'; Kruse 78'	Stadium: Trolli Arena; Attendance: 16,735; Referee: Daniel Siebert

18 May 2013 34	SC Freiburg	1–2	Schalke 04	Freiburg
15:30 CEST	Schmid 54'; Ginter (yellow card) 72'; Makiadi (yellow card) 73'	Report	Draxler 20'; Schuster 57' (o.g.); Farfán (yellow card) 66'	Stadium: Mage Solar Stadion; Attendance: 24,000; Referee: Dr. Felix Brych

=== DFB-Pokal ===
18 August 2012 1st round	Victoria Hamburg	1–2	SC Freiburg	Hamburg
15:30 CEST	Sachs 12'; Rabenhorst (yellow card) 50'; Lauer (yellow card) 87'	Report (in German)	Kruse 11'; Diagne (yellow card) 45'; Schuster (yellow card) 51'; Freis 79'	Stadium: Stadion Hoheluft; Attendance: 4,375; Referee: Christian Dietz (Kronach)

30 October 2012 2nd round	Eintracht Braunschweig	0–2	SC Freiburg	Braunschweig
19:00 CET	Theuerkauf (yellow card) 32'; Kruppke (yellow card) 45'; Reichel (yellow card) 61'	Report (in German)	Caligiuri 1'; Freis (yellow card) 31'; Flum 84'; Guédé (yellow card) 88'	Stadium: Eintracht-Stadion; Attendance: 20,167; Referee: Felix Brych (Munich)

18 December 2012 Round of 16	Karlsruher SC	0–1	SC Freiburg	Karlsruhe
19:00 CET	Hennings (yellow card) 45+1'; Kempe (yellow card) 61'; Peitz (yellow card) 79'	Report (in German)	Schmid 2'; Rosenthal (yellow card) 69'; Kruse (yellow card) 90'; Caligiuri (yellow card) 90+3'	Stadium: Wildparkstadion; Attendance: 28,200; Referee: Jochen Drees (Münster-Sarmsheim)

26 February 2013 Quarter-finals	Mainz 05	2–3 (a.e.t.)	SC Freiburg	Mainz
19:00 CET	Parker 2'; Zimling 4'; Pospěch (yellow card) 56' (yellow-red card) 65'; Baumgartlinger (yellow card) 105'	Report (in German)	Rosenthal (yellow card) 66'; Krmaš (yellow card) 71'; Santini 86'; Caligiuri 90+3' (pen.), 108'; Makiadi (yellow card) 117'	Stadium: Coface Arena; Attendance: 23,517; Referee: Deniz Aytekin (Oberasbach)

17 April 2013 Semi-finals	VfB Stuttgart	2–1	SC Freiburg	Mercedes-Benz Arena, Stuttgart
20:30 CEST	Boka 9', (yellow card) 21'; Harnik 29'; Niedermeier (yellow card) 57'; Molinaro (yellow card) 73'	Report	Rosenthal 14'; Mujdža (yellow card) 63'; Diagne (yellow card) 69'	Attendance: 60,000; Referee: Florian Meyer (Burgdorf)

== Squad information ==
=== Squad and statistics ===
As of 4 March 2013

No.	Pos	Nat	Player	Total		Bundesliga		DFB-Pokal	
No.	Pos	Nat	Player	Apps	Goals	Apps	Goals	Apps	Goals
Goalkeepers
1	GK	(Germany) GER	Oliver Baumann	28	0	24	0	4	0
19	GK	(Germany) GER	Daniel Batz	0	0	0	0	0	0
36	GK	(Germany) GER	Alexander Schwolow	0	0	0	0	0	0
Defenders
2	DF	(Czech Republic) CZE	Pavel Krmaš	14	2	11	2	3	0
3	DF	(Senegal) SEN	Fallou Diagne	24	1	21	1	3	0
6	DF	(Norway) NOR	Vegar Eggen Hedenstad	18	0	14	0	4	0
24	DF	(Bosnia and Herzegovina) BIH	Mensur Mujdža	16	1	14	0	2	1
25	DF	(Germany) GER	Oliver Sorg	27	0	24	0	3	0
28	DF	(Germany) GER	Matthias Ginter	15	1	13	1	2	0
30	DF	(Germany) GER	Christian Günter	4	0	3	0	1	0
41	DF	(Germany) GER	Immanuel Höhn	2	0	2	0	0	0
Midfielders
7	MF	(Democratic Republic of the Congo) COD	Cédric Makiadi	25	2	21	2	4	0
8	MF	(Germany) GER	Jan Rosenthal	17	4	14	4	3	0
11	MF	(Germany) GER	Hendrick Zuck	0	0	0	0	0	0
14	MF	(Belarus) BLR	Anton Putsila	2	0	2	0	0	0
17	MF	(France) FRA	Jonathan Schmid	27	6	23	5	4	1
18	MF	(Germany) GER	Johannes Flum	22	1	19	0	3	1
20	MF	(Germany) GER	Max Kruse	28	7	24	6	4	1
21	MF	(Spain) ESP	Ezequiel Calvente	2	0	2	0	0	0
22	MF	(Germany) GER	Marco Terrazzino	3	1	3	1	0	0
23	MF	(Germany) GER	Julian Schuster	26	1	22	1	4	0
31	MF	(Slovenia) SLO	Karim Guédé	22	1	18	1	4	0
32	MF	(Germany) GER	Marc Lais	1	0	1	0	0	0
40	MF	(Germany) GER	Daniel Caligiuri	24	8	21	5	3	3
Strikers
9	FW	(Croatia) CRO	Ivan Santini	8	1	6	0	2	1
11	FW	(Mali) MLI	Garra Dembélé	3	0	3	0	0	0
26	FW	(Slovenia) SLO	Erik Jendrišek	9	0	9	0	0	0
33	FW	(France) FRA	Mounir Bouziane	0	0	0	0	0	0
35	FW	(Germany) GER	Sebastian Freis	14	2	12	1	2	1

=== Transfers ===
==== In ====
No.	Pos.	Nat.	Name	Age	EU	Moving from	Type	Transfer window	Ends	Transfer fee	Source
20	MF	(Germany)	Max Kruse	24	EU	FC St. Pauli	Transfer	Summer	June 2014	€750,000	
22	MF	(Germany)	Marco Terrazzino	21	EU	Karlsruher SC	Transfer	Summer	June 2015	Free	
6	DF	(Norway)	Vegar Eggen Hedenstad	21	EU	Stabæk (Norway)	Transfer	Summer	Undisclosed	ca. €500,000	
21	MF	(Spain)	Ezequiel Calvente	21	EU	Betis (Spain)	Loan	Summer	June 2013	Undisclosed	
11	MF	(Germany)	Hendrick Zuck	22	EU	1. FC Kaiserslautern	Transfer	Winter	Undisclosed	Undisclosed	

==== Out ====
No.	Pos.	Nat.	Name	Age	EU	Moving to	Type	Transfer window	Transfer fee	Source
	DF	(Germany)	Andreas Hinkel	30	EU		End of contract	Summer	Free	
30	DF	(Denmark)	Michael Lumb	24	EU	Zenit St. Petersburg (Russia)	End of loan	Summer	Free	
9	FW	(Germany)	Simon Brandstetter	22	EU	Karlsruher SC	Loan	Summer	Undisclosed	
4	DF	(Germany)	Oliver Barth	32	EU	VfR Aalen	End of contract	Summer	Free	
27	FW	(Germany)	Stefan Reisinger	30	EU	Fortuna Düsseldorf	Transfer	Summer	Undisclosed	
	DF	(Switzerland)	Beg Ferati	26	EU	Winterthur (Switzerland)	Loan	Winter	Undisclosed	
	DF	(Mali)	Garra Dembélé	26	Non-EU		Loan	Winter	Undisclosed	
	MF	(Belarus)	Anton Putsila	25	Non-EU	Volga Nizhny Novgorod (Russia)	End of contract	Winter	Free	

== Kits ==
Home	Home Alternate	Away	Away Alternate	Third
