= Jan Rosenthal =

German professional footballer (born 1986)

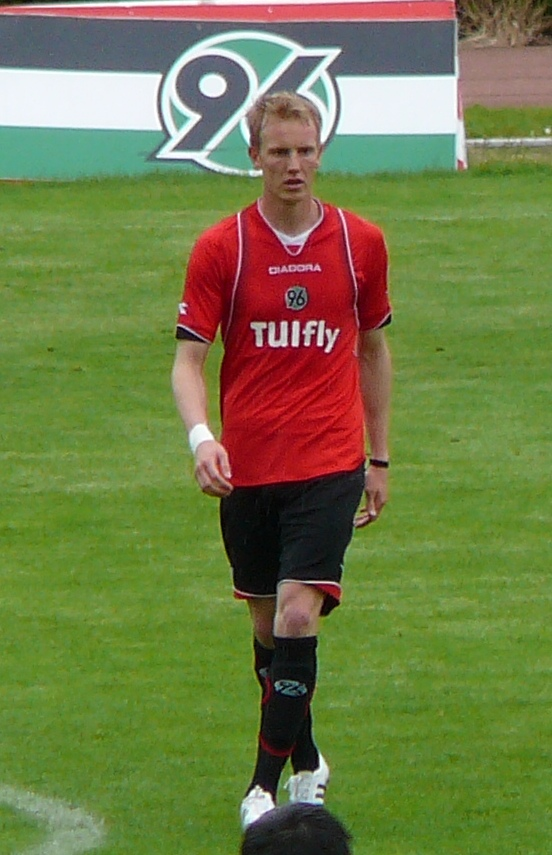
- Rosenthal with Hannover 96 in 2008

Personal information
- Full name: Jan Rosenthal
- Date of birth: 7 April 1986 (age 40)
- Place of birth: Sulingen, West Germany
- Height: 1.85 m (6 ft 1 in)
- Position: Attacking midfielder

Youth career
- 1992–2000: SV Staffhorst
- 2000–2005: Hannover 96

Senior career*
Years	Team	Apps	(Gls)
2005–2010	Hannover 96	80	(11)
2009	Hannover 96 II	9	(1)
2010–2013	SC Freiburg	60	(11)
2011	SC Freiburg II	3	(0)
2013–2015	Eintracht Frankfurt	18	(2)
2015	→ Darmstadt 98 (loan)	9	(1)
2015–2018	Darmstadt 98	63	(1)
2019–2020	VfB Oldenburg	1	(0)
Total		234	(26)

International career
2004–2005	Germany U19	2	(0)
2007–2009	Germany U21	16	(2)
- * Club domestic league appearances and goals

Jan Rosenthal (born 7 April 1986) is a German former professional footballer who played as an attacking midfielder.

== Career ==
=== Hannover ===
Born in Sulingen, Lower Saxony, Rosenthal began his professional career with Hannover 96 in 2005, on a five-year deal, but had to wait until 13 August 2006 before he made his first Bundesliga appearance, as a substitute, in a 4–2 defeat to Werder Bremen. His first Bundesliga goal came against Schalke 04 in the first game he started on 21 October 2006. He settled well into the team following this, and was regular choice throughout the 2006–07 season.

=== SC Freiburg ===
After ten years with Hannover 96, Rosenthal signed a three-year contract with SC Freiburg on 11 June 2010.

=== Eintracht Frankfurt ===
On 8 March 2013, Eintracht Frankfurt announced the versatile midfielder was going to join their squad for the 2013–14 season. Rosenthal signed a three-year contract with the side. Rosenthal was loaned to 2. Bundesliga side SV Darmstadt 98 in February 2015 for the remainder of the season.

=== Darmstadt 98 ===
After the loan, Frankfurt and Rosenthal agreed to terminate the contract after which Rosenthal signed for then promoted Bundesliga side Darmstadt 98 permanently for a duration of two years. In June 2017, after the club's relegation to the 2. Bundesliga, he extended his contract with the club until 2019.

In June 2018, Rosenthal announced his retirement from professional football and agreed the termination of his running contract with Darmstadt 98.

=== VfB Oldenburg ===
Rosenthal returned from his retirement in summer 2019, joining fourth-tier side VfB Oldenburg on a deal for the 2019–20 season.

== International career ==
Rosenthal represented his country at both under-19 and under-21 levels.

== Career statistics ==
Appearances and goals by club, season and competition
Club	Season	League			Cup		Continental (Note: Includes UEFA Europa League.)		Total		Ref.
Club	Season	League	Apps	Goals	Apps	Goals	Apps	Goals	Apps	Goals	Ref.
Hannover 96 II	2006–07	Oberliga Nord	3	0	—		—		3	0	
Hannover 96 II	2007–08	Oberliga Nord	5	1	—		—		5	1	
Hannover 96 II	2009–10	Regionalliga Nord	1	0	—		—		1	0	
Hannover 96 II	Total		9	1	0	0	0	0	9	1	—
Hannover 96	2006–07	Bundesliga	29	6	4	0	—		33	6	
Hannover 96	2007–08	Bundesliga	23	4	1	0	—		24	4	
Hannover 96	2007–08	Bundesliga	12	0	1	0	—		13	0	
Hannover 96	2009–10	Bundesliga	16	1	1	1	—		17	2	
Hannover 96	Total		80	11	7	1	0	0	87	12	—
SC Freiburg	2010–11	Bundesliga	22	5	1	0	—		23	5	
SC Freiburg	2011–12	Bundesliga	18	2	0	0	—		18	2	
SC Freiburg	2012–13	Bundesliga	20	4	4	1	—		24	5	
SC Freiburg	Total		60	11	5	1	0	0	65	12	—
SC Freiburg II	2011–12	Regionalliga Süd	3	0	—		—		3	0	
Eintracht Frankfurt	2013–14	Bundesliga	18	2	3	0	3	0	24	2	
Darmstadt 98	2014–15	2. Bundesliga	9	1	0	0	—		9	1	
Darmstadt 98|	2015–16	Bundesliga	23	0	2	0	—		25	0	
Darmstadt 98|	2016–17	Bundesliga	19	0	—		—		19	0	
Darmstadt 98|	2017–18	2. Bundesliga	12	0	—		—		12	0	
Darmstadt 98|	Total		54	0	2	0	0	0	56	0	—
VfB Oldenburg	2019–20	Regionalliga Nord	1	0	—		—		1	0	
Career total			234	26	17	2	3	0	254	28	—
