= Andreas Bornemann =

German footballer (born 1971)

Andreas Bornemann (born 15 September 1971) is a German former footballer and current official. Since 1 July 2019, he has been the Sporting director of FC St. Pauli.

== Playing career ==
Bornemann was born in Neuenburg am Rhein. He joined SC Freiburg in 1988 from his hometown club FC Neuenburg. Playing mainly for the club's amateurs, he also made six Bundesliga appearances and 2. Bundesliga appearances on the professional team between 1991 and 2000.

== Managerial career ==
From 2000 to 2002, Bornemann headed the Freiburger Fußballschule. Under his Patronage, the old Möslestadion was converted into Freiburger Fußballschule for an investment of €12 million. On 21 February 2002, he succeeded the outgoing manager Andreas Rettig, who then went to 1. FC Köln. At the end of the season, SC Freiburg was relegated to the 2. Bundesliga, where Bornemann remained manager from then on. After the dismissal of coach Volker Finke, he was replaced by Dirk Dufner in June 2007. He then succeeded Jörg Schmadtke as Sports director on 3 January 2009 at Alemannia Aachen until the supervisory board gave him leave on 29 November 2009. Bornemann became Sports director of Holstein Kiel on 2 February 2010 and held this position until the summer of 2014. On 21 May 2014, second division club SpVgg Greuther Fürth announced Bornemann's commitment as sporting director. However, SpVgg Greuther Fürth announced on 27 June 2014 that Bornemann could not take the job for personal reasons. Later, media reports triggered by Bornemann's statements made it known that Bornemann had been working at SpVgg Greuther Fürth since 1 June to prepare for his new position, but resigned after three weeks due to differences with the presidency. On 21 September 2015, 1. FC Nürnberg announced that Andreas Bornemann would succeed Martin Bader as sporting director. There he was dismissed in February 2019 for defying the board of directors. At this time, 1. FC Nürnberg was in 18th place in the table.

On 1 July 2019, Bornemann became sporting director of the 2. Bundesliga club FC St. Pauli.
