= Papiss Cissé =

Senegalese footballer (born 1985)

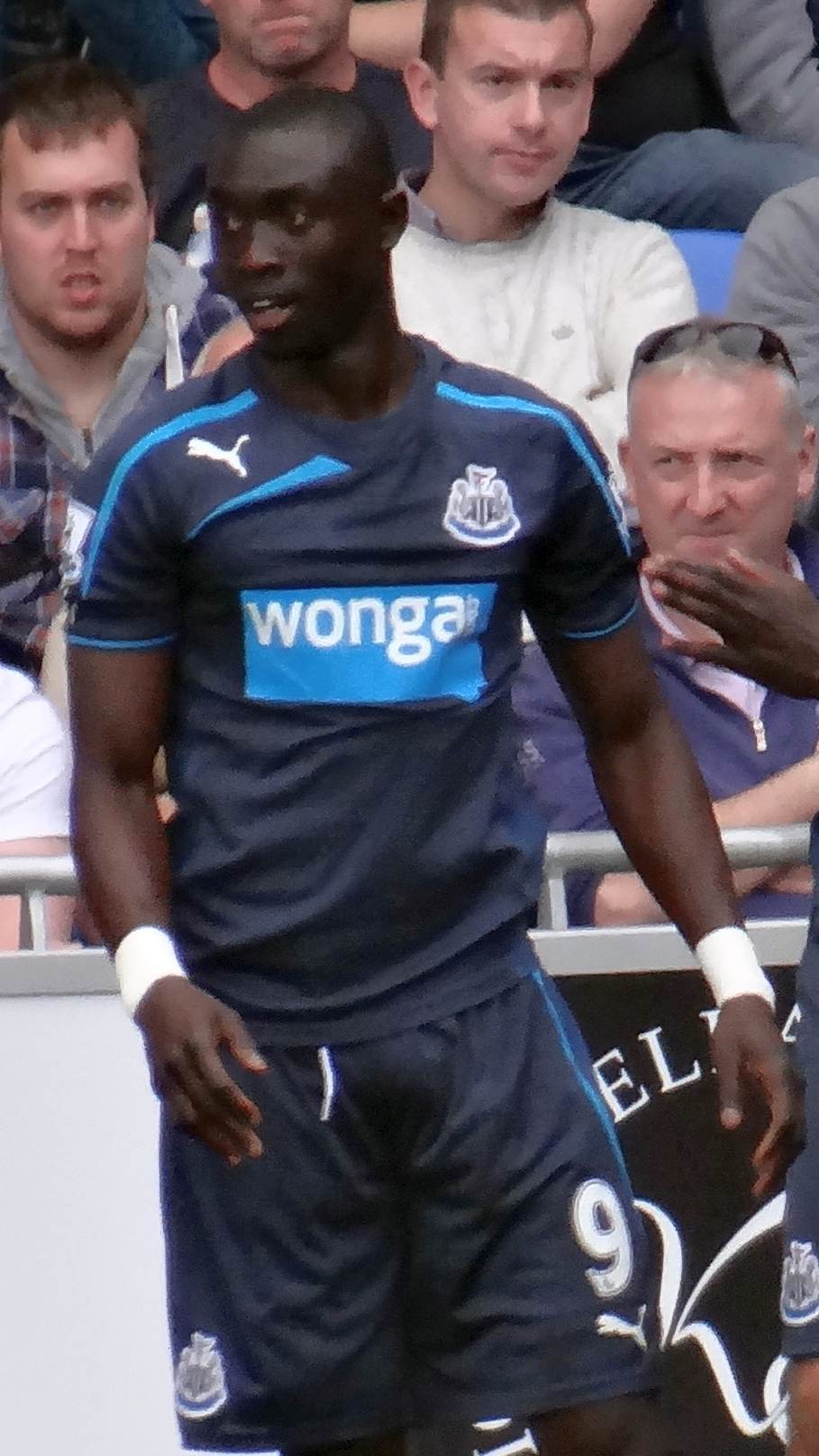
- Cissé playing for Newcastle United in 2013

Personal information
- Full name: Papiss Demba Cissé
- Date of birth: 3 June 1985 (age 41)
- Place of birth: Dakar, Senegal
- Height: 1.81 m (5 ft 11 in)
- Position: Forward

Youth career
- Génération Foot

Senior career*
Years	Team	Apps	(Gls)
2000–2004	AS Douanes	26	(23)
2004–2010	Metz	95	(36)
2005–2006	→ Cherbourg (loan)	28	(19)
2008–2009	→ Châteauroux (loan)	15	(4)
2010–2012	SC Freiburg	65	(37)
2012–2016	Newcastle United	117	(37)
2016–2018	Shandong Luneng	31	(16)
2018–2020	Alanyaspor	58	(38)
2020–2021	Fenerbahçe	25	(5)
2022	Çaykur Rizespor	14	(2)
2022–2023	Amiens	30	(10)
2025	Palm City	13	(17)

International career^{‡}
2009–2015	Senegal	36	(17)
- * Club domestic league appearances and goals as of 2 June 2023 ‡ National team caps and goals as of 29 January 2015

Papiss Demba Cissé (French pronunciation: [sise]; born 3 June 1985) is a Senegalese former professional footballer who played as a forward.

Formerly of SC Freiburg, he once held the record of most goals scored by an African player in a single Bundesliga campaign – 22 in the 2010–11 season.

A full international for Senegal from 2009 to 2015, Cissé represented the country at the 2012 and 2015 Africa Cup of Nations.

== Club career ==
=== Early career ===
Cissé began his career with Génération Foot and Douanes Dakar before transferring to the French side Metz in summer 2005. After only one month during the 2005–06 season, he left Metz and was loaned to French side Cherbourg. During the season, Cissé played 26 matches and scored 11 goals for the Normandy club. After the season, Cissé returned to Metz for a further two years before being loaned again to Châteauroux in January 2008 and before returning to Metz in July 2008 for a third stint.

=== SC Freiburg ===
Cissé signed for German Bundesliga side SC Freiburg on 28 December 2009 for a fee of €1.62 million. He initially became a transfer target for Freiburg in the summer of 2009 after he scored a goal and assisted on another in a 2–1 friendly win for Metz over the club. However, a transfer fee could not be agreed upon at the time. Hannover 96 also expressed interest in the player. In his first partial season at Freiburg, Cissé appeared in 16 matches, scoring six goals.

During the 2010–11 Bundesliga season, which was his first full season with Freiburg, Cissé was ranked second in the league in terms of goals scored, only behind Mario Gómez of Bayern Munich, who scored 28. Cissé also set a club and league record; his 22 goals during the course of the season set the single-season goal record by a Freiburg player, as well as setting a new record for the most goals scored by an African in a single Bundesliga season. The record was previously held by Tony Yeboah, who scored 20 goals with Eintracht Frankfurt in 1992–93. That same season, Cissé won the EFFIFU award for being the most efficient striker in the league.

=== Newcastle United ===
==== 2011–12 season ====
On 21 January 2012, Cissé signed for Newcastle United on a five-and-a-half-year deal for an estimated fee in the region of £9.3 million, linking up with fellow Senegal striker Demba Ba in the process. He was subsequently handed the number 9 shirt, formerly worn by Newcastle legend Alan Shearer. On 5 February, Cissé made his debut for Newcastle in the 2–1 league win against Aston Villa at St James' Park. He replaced the injured Leon Best in the 14th minute before scoring the winning goal in the 71st minute with a breath-taking volley, chesting it before volleying with his left into the top left corner of the net. On 11 February, he made his first start for the club in the 5–0 away league defeat against Tottenham Hotspur at White Hart Lane. On 25 February, he scored in the sixth minute in a 2–2 home draw against Wolverhampton Wanderers. On 25 March, he scored two first-half goals in Newcastle's 1–3 league victory against West Bromwich Albion at The Hawthorns, but he was denied a hat-trick early in the second half by a save by West Brom goalkeeper Ben Foster. Cissé's brace against West Brom made him the quickest player since Les Ferdinand to hit the five-goal mark for Newcastle.

Cissé scored his sixth and seventh goals, against Liverpool, in a 2–0 home win. He scored a third consecutive brace at Liberty Stadium in a 2–0 away win against Swansea City on 6 April, bringing his tally to nine goals in eight matches. This made him Newcastle's most prolific goals per-game goalscorer of all-time, ahead of Hughie Gallacher. On 9 April, he scored his tenth goal in nine matches for Newcastle against Bolton Wanderers in a 2–0 home win. On 21 April, Cissé scored his 11th goal in ten matches during a 3–0 win against Stoke City. He then managed to score his 12th and 13th Premier League goals in a 2–0 win against Chelsea at Stamford Bridge on 2 May 2012, the second of which he curled the ball with the outside of his foot from 37 yards out, which looped over goalkeeper Petr Cech. Cissé described the goal as the best of his career, and was subsequently chosen as the BBC's Goal of the Season. At the end of his first half season with Newcastle, he was known for his consistent goalscoring, with astonishing goals firing the North East club into a fifth place spot in the table.

==== 2012–13 season ====
On 4 July 2012, it was reported that Newcastle had blocked an offer from the Senegalese Football Federation for Cissé to play for Senegal at 2012 Summer Olympics in London. The reason behind the decision was that Newcastle wanted their key striker fit for a tough season ahead, playing European football. Cissé scored his first goal in the 2012–13 season with a header in the League Cup against Manchester United. He scored Newcastle's third goal in their Europa League defeat of Bordeaux on 4 October 2012, Newcastle's 100th match in European competition. He scored his first Premier League goal of the season in a 2–1 win over West Bromwich Albion on 28 October 2012, as a shot taken by Sammy Ameobi deflected off Cissé and into the net. The striker's scoring was scarce throughout the opening four months of the season, only scoring his second league goal of the season on 28 November, a 2–1 away defeat to Stoke City.

Cissé started against Everton alongside Shola Ameobi and scored a header in the second minute in a 2–1 defeat on 2 January 2013. Cissé scored a spectacular 25-yard volley in Newcastle's 4–2 win over Southampton on 24 February, helping the club come from behind to secure a crucial victory over fellow relegation strugglers. Cissé scored an injury time winner at home to Stoke City on 10 March, sending Newcastle into 13th place. On 14 March, in the second leg Europa League Round of 16 tie at home to Anzhi Makhachkala, Cissé headed in a 94th-minute winner as Newcastle progressed to the quarter-finals with a 1–0 aggregate victory.

Cissé also scored the first goal in a 3–1 loss away to Benfica in the first leg of Newcastle's Europa League quarter-final tie on 4 April. Three days later, he scored an injury time winner in a 1–0 victory over Fulham, causing him to jump into the crowd and sent manager Alan Pardew, in celebration, running in also. Cissé scored his fourth goal of the Europa League campaign in a 1–1 home draw with Benfica, but it was not enough to see Newcastle into the semi-finals of the competition as they fell 4–2 on aggregate.

==== 2013–14 season ====
On 25 September 2013, Cissé opened his account for the 2013–14 season in a 2–0 win for Newcastle against Leeds United in the third round of the Football League Cup. Cissé scored his first Premier League goal of the season in a 5–1 home rout of Stoke City on Boxing Day, converting a late penalty.

On 22 March 2014, he scored a last-minute winner to claim all three points for Newcastle in a 1–0 victory at home to Crystal Palace, only his second league goal of the season. Cissé's season finished on 19 April against Swansea City as he limped off in the 21st minute. It was revealed by Newcastle that Cissé had broken his kneecap and that he had undergone surgery on the injury.

==== 2014–15 season ====
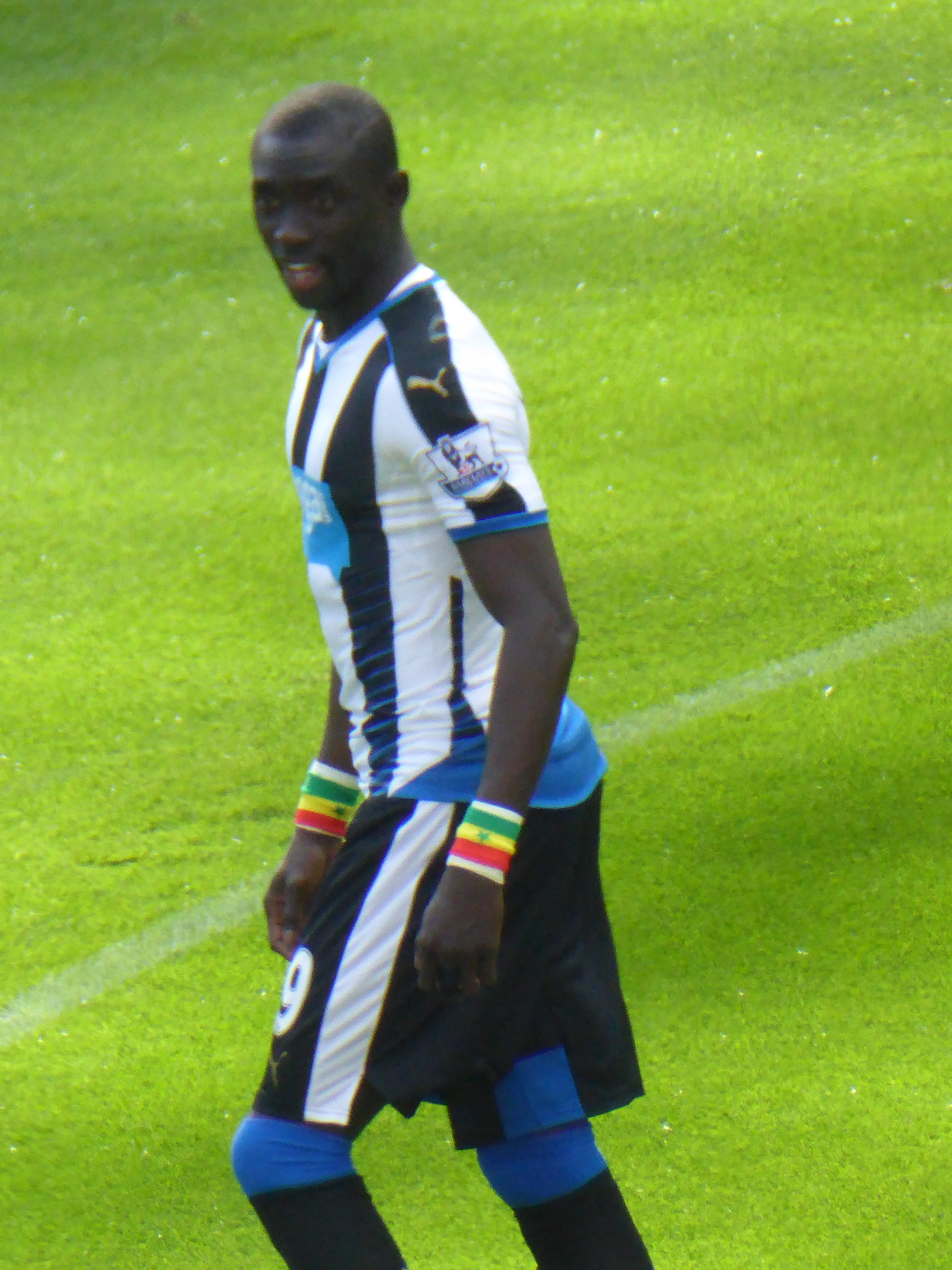
Cissé playing for Newcastle United in 2015

After breaking his knee cap against Swansea in April 2014, Cissé returned to France to recover from his injury. In June, it was revealed that Cissé would return from his injury earlier than expected and would return to Newcastle for pre-season training along with the rest of the first-team squad. On 10 September 2014, Newcastle manager Alan Pardew confirmed that Cissé would return to the Newcastle squad for their home match against Hull City on 20 September.

Cissé made his return from injury against Hull on 20 September, replacing Emmanuel Rivière in the second half, and scoring both goals for Newcastle as they came back from two goals down to rescue a 2–2 draw. Cissé celebrated both goals by lifting up his jersey to reveal a message dedicated to team-mate Jonás Gutiérrez, who recently revealed that he had been diagnosed with testicular cancer. Two weeks later, another brace by Cissé earned Newcastle an identical result at Swansea City. On 5 December, he came on as a substitute for Rémy Cabella and scored both of Newcastle's goals as they defeated leaders Chelsea 2–1, inflicting on their opponents a first defeat of the season. After scoring a penalty on Boxing Day in the 3–1 loss at Manchester United, Cissé scored again. In the next match, scoring the equaliser in a 3–2 victory over Everton on 28 December, taking his tally to nine league goals in just 14 matches. During the match, however, he intentionally thrust his elbow into Séamus Coleman's face during a corner. Cissé was charged with dangerous conduct and banned for three matches by the FA. After returning from the 2015 Africa Cup of Nations, Cissé scored a header against Crystal Palace, his tenth league goal of the season, on 11 February. On 28 February, he scored his 11th goal of the season against Aston Villa with a goal just outside the six-yard box.

On 7 March 2015, Cissé was handed a six-match ban by the FA after a spitting incident with Manchester United defender Jonny Evans, and one more for elbowing Everton's Séamus Coleman. All together, it was a seven-match ban. Cissé returned to the team as a second-half substitute in Newcastle's 1–1 draw with West Brom on 9 May.

==== 2015–16 season ====
Cissé started the first match of the season at home against Southampton, scoring after chesting the ball in from close range to make the score 1–1. Despite scoring, however, he was substituted for new signing Aleksandar Mitrović, who had recently joined from Anderlecht. The match finished in a 2–2 draw. On 28 November 2015, he opened the scoring in an eventual 5–1 loss to Crystal Palace. Cissé's final goal for the club came in a 2–2 draw against Liverpool, on 23 April 2016.

=== Shandong Luneng ===
On 9 July 2016, it was announced that Cissé had joined Chinese Super League club Shandong Luneng for an undisclosed fee. He scored on his second appearance for the club, in an eventual 4–1 win over Hangzhou Greentown.

=== Alanyaspor ===
==== 2018–19 season ====
On 31 August 2018, he signed with Alanyaspor of the Turkish Süper Lig. He made his debut against Göztepe on 1 September 2018 and he scored his first goal against Kasımpaşa on 23 September 2018 and in the same game he scored one more goal and Alanyaspor won the game 2–1.

On 28 April 2019, Cissé was involved in a coach crash which killed team-mate Josef Šural. Cissé escaped with minor injuries.

=== Fenerbahçe ===
On 1 October 2020, Fenerbahçe announced the signing of Cissé.

=== Amiens ===
On 31 August 2022, Cissé signed with Ligue 2 side Amiens. On 1 July 2023, Cissé was released.

=== Al Qabila FC ===
In March 2025, Cissé returned to football to play for UAE Second Division League side Palm City.

== International career ==
Cissé made his international debut for Senegal on 12 August 2009, in a friendly away to Congo DR, scoring two goals as Senegal emerged victorious 2–1. Cissé scored a hat-trick in his fourth appearance for the national side, as Senegal ran away to a 7–0 victory over Mauritius on 9 October 2010 in a qualifying match for the 2012 Africa Cup of Nations. Cissé also captained the Senegal team from 2012 to 2013. Cissé's most recent Senegalese goal was against Botswana in November 2014, his 16th international goal.

== Personal life ==
Cissé is a practicing Muslim, and when celebrating a goal he often performs the Sujud. He along with other Muslim Newcastle players Cheick Tioté, Demba Ba and Hatem Ben Arfa allegedly objected to Newcastle United's shirt-sponsorship deal with high-interest loans company Wonga as Islam generally forbids promoting usury or financial exploitation. Following the publication of a photograph showing Cissé at a gaming table at Aspers Casino in Newcastle, it was announced that the matter had been resolved, with Cissé agreeing to wear the shirt featuring the logo of the loan company.

== Career statistics ==
=== Club ===
As of match played 1 April 2023

Appearances and goals by club, season and competition
Club	Season	League			National cup (Note: Includes Coupe de France, DFB-Pokal, FA Cup, Chinese FA Cup, Turkish Cup)		League cup (Note: Includes Coupe de la Ligue, EFL Cup)		Continental		Total	
Club	Season	Division	Apps	Goals	Apps	Goals	Apps	Goals	Apps	Goals	Apps	Goals
Metz	2005–06	Ligue 1	1	0	0	0	0	0	–		1	0
Metz	2006–07	Ligue 2	32	12	2	0	1	0	–		35	12
Metz	2007–08	Ligue 1	9	0	0	0	0	0	–		9	0
Metz	2008–09	Ligue 2	37	16	0	0	1	0	–		38	16
Metz	2009–10	Ligue 2	16	8	2	1	3	1	–		21	10
Metz	Total		95	36	4	1	5	1	–		104	38
AS Cherbourg (loan)	2005–06	Championnat National	28	11	0	0	0	0	–		28	11
Châteauroux (loan)	2007–08	Ligue 2	15	4	0	0	0	0	–		15	4
SC Freiburg	2009–10	Bundesliga	16	6	0	0	–		–		16	6
SC Freiburg	2010–11	Bundesliga	32	22	2	2	–		–		34	24
SC Freiburg	2011–12	Bundesliga	17	9	0	0	–		–		17	9
SC Freiburg	Total		65	37	2	2	–		–		67	39
Newcastle United	2011–12	Premier League	14	13	0	0	–		–		14	13
Newcastle United	2012–13	Premier League	36	8	0	0	1	1	10 (Note: Appearances in UEFA Europa League)	4	47	13
Newcastle United	2013–14	Premier League	24	2	1	1	2	1	–		27	4
Newcastle United	2014–15	Premier League	22	11	0	0	0	0	–		22	11
Newcastle United	2015–16	Premier League	21	3	0	0	0	0	–		21	3
Newcastle United	Total		117	37	1	1	3	2	10	4	131	44
Shandong Luneng	2016	Chinese Super League	13	5	0	0	–		–		13	5
Shandong Luneng	2017	Chinese Super League	18	11	2	0	–		–		20	11
Shandong Luneng	2018	Chinese Super League	0	0	1	2	–		–		1	2
Shandong Luneng	Total		31	16	3	2	–		–		34	18
Alanyaspor	2018–19	Süper Lig	26	16	1	0	–		–		27	16
Alanyaspor	2019–20	Süper Lig	32	22	5	4	–		–		37	26
Alanyaspor	Total		58	38	6	4	–		–		64	42
Fenerbahçe	2020–21	Süper Lig	25	5	3	0	–		–		28	5
Çaykur Rizespor	2021–22	Süper Lig	14	2	0	0	–		–		14	2
Amiens	2022–23	Ligue 2	30	10	2	3	–		–		32	13
Career total			478	196	21	13	8	3	10	4	517	216

=== International ===
Appearances and goals by national team and year
National team	Year	Apps	Goals
Senegal	2009	4	3
Senegal	2010	4	4
Senegal	2011	6	2
Senegal	2012	10	3
Senegal	2013	6	4
Senegal	2014	4	1
Senegal	2015	2	0
Total		36	17

Scores and results list Senegal's goal tally first, score column indicates score after each Cissé goal.

List of international goals scored by Papiss Cissé
No.	Date	Venue	Opponent	Score	Result	Competition	Ref.
1	1 April 2009	Azadi Stadium, Tehran, Iran	Iran	1-1	1-1	Friendly	
2	12 August 2009	Allées Jean Leroi Municipal Stadium, Blois, France	DR Congo	1-0	2-1	Friendly	
3	12 August 2009	Allées Jean Leroi Municipal Stadium, Blois, France	DR Congo	2-0	2-1	Friendly	
4	9 October 2010	Stade Léopold Sédar Senghor, Dakar, Senegal	Mauritius	1-0	7-0	2012 Africa Cup of Nations qualification	
5	9 October 2010	Stade Léopold Sédar Senghor, Dakar, Senegal	Mauritius	3-0	7-0	2012 Africa Cup of Nations qualification	
6	9 October 2010	Stade Léopold Sédar Senghor, Dakar, Senegal	Mauritius	6-0	7-0	2012 Africa Cup of Nations qualification	
7	17 November 2010	Parc des Sports Michel Hidalgo, Sannois, France	Gabon	1-1	2-1	Friendly	
8	9 February 2011	Stade Léopold Sédar Senghor, Dakar, Senegal	Guinea	1-0	3-0	Friendly	
9	9 October 2011	Anjalay Stadium, Belle Vue Harel, Mauritius	Mauritius	2-0	2-0	2012 Africa Cup of Nations qualification	
10	15 January 2012	Stade Léopold Sédar Senghor, Dakar, Senegal	Kenya	1-0	1-0	Friendly	
11	9 June 2012	Mandela National Stadium, Kira Town, Uganda	Uganda	1-0	1-1	2014 FIFA World Cup qualification	
12	8 September 2012	Felix Houphouet Boigny Stadium, Abidjan, Ivory Coast	Ivory Coast	2-1	2-4	2013 Africa Cup of Nations qualification	
13	7 June 2013	Estádio 11 de Novembro, Talatona, Angola	Angola	1-0	1-1	2014 FIFA World Cup qualification	
14	16 June 2013	Antoinette Tubman Stadium, Monrovia, Liberia	Liberia	1-0	2-0	2014 FIFA World Cup qualification	
15	16 June 2013	Antoinette Tubman Stadium, Monrovia, Liberia	Liberia	2-0	2-0	2014 FIFA World Cup qualification	
16	12 October 2013	Felix Houphouet Boigny Stadium, Abidjan, Ivory Coast	Ivory Coast	1-3	1-3	2014 FIFA World Cup qualification	
17	19 November 2014	Stade Léopold Sédar Senghor, Dakar, Senegal	Botswana	2-0	3-0	2015 Africa Cup of Nations qualification	

== Honours ==
FC Metz

- Ligue 2: 2006-07
