= Mensur Mujdža =

Bosnian footballer (born 1984)

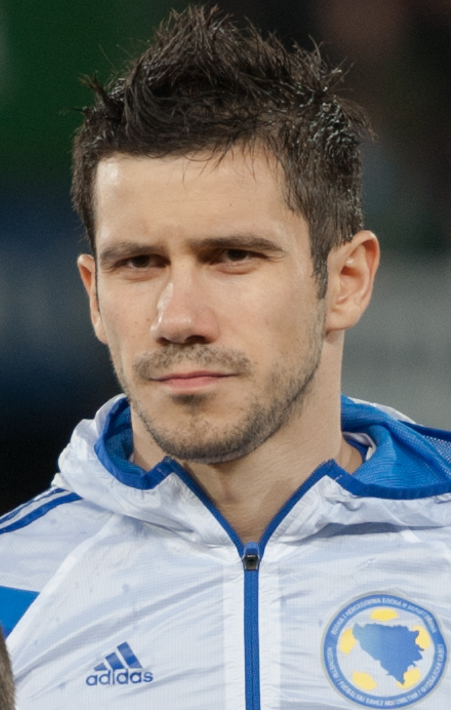
- Mujdža with Bosnia and Herzegovina in 2015

Personal information
- Date of birth: 28 March 1984 (age 42)
- Place of birth: Zagreb, SR Croatia, SFR Yugoslavia
- Height: 1.85 m (6 ft 1 in)
- Position: Right-back

Team information
- Current team: FK Kauno Žalgiris (assistant coach)

Youth career
- 1994–2003: Zagreb

Senior career*
Years	Team	Apps	(Gls)
2003–2009	Zagreb	142	(5)
2009–2016	SC Freiburg	118	(1)
2016–2017	1. FC Kaiserslautern	0	(0)
Total		260	(6)

International career
2004	Croatia U20	1	(0)
2005–2006	Croatia U21	8	(2)
2010–2015	Bosnia and Herzegovina	37	(0)

Managerial career
- 2022–2026 2026–: Gorica (assistant); FK Kauno Žalgiris (assistant)
- * Club domestic league appearances and goals

Mensur Mujdža (pronounced [měnsur mǔjdʒa]; born 28 March 1984) is a Bosnian professional football manager and former player who is currently an assistant manager for TOPLYGA club FK Kauno Žalgiris.

Mujdža started his professional career at Zagreb, before joining SC Freiburg in 2009. Seven years later, he moved to 1. FC Kaiserslautern.

A former Croatian youth international, Mujdža made his senior international debut for Bosnia and Herzegovina in 2010, earning 37 caps until his retirement in 2015. He represented the nation at their first major championship, the 2014 FIFA World Cup.

== Club career ==
=== Early career ===
Mujdža came through the youth setup of his hometown club Zagreb, which he joined in 1994. He made his professional debut in 2003 at the age of 19.

=== SC Freiburg ===
In June 2009, Mujdža was transferred to German outfit SC Freiburg for an undisclosed fee. He made his official debut for the team on 22 August against Bayer Leverkusen.

In January 2011, he extended his contract with the club until June 2016.

On 28 April 2012, he scored his first goal for SC Freiburg in a triumph over 1. FC Köln.

Mujdža played his 100th game for the side on 18 October 2014 against VfL Wolfsburg.

In July 2015, he became team captain.

He was an important piece in SC Freiburg's capture of the 2. Bundesliga title, his first trophy with the club, which was secured on 30 April 2016 and earned them promotion to the Bundesliga just one season after being relegated.

=== Later stage of career ===
In August 2016, Mujdža signed with 1. FC Kaiserslautern.

He announced his retirement from football on 14 November 2017.

== International career ==
Despite representing Croatia at various youth levels, Mujdža decided to play for Bosnia and Herzegovina at the senior level.

In July 2010, his request to change sports citizenship from Croatian to Bosnian was approved by FIFA. Later that month, he received his first senior call-up, for a friendly game against Qatar, and debuted in that game on 10 August.

In June 2014, Mujdža was named in Bosnia and Herzegovina's squad for the 2014 FIFA World Cup, the country's first major competition. He made his tournament debut in the opening group match against Argentina on 15 June.

== Personal life ==
Mujdža's older brother Jasmin was also a professional footballer.

== Career statistics ==
=== Club ===
As of match played 15 May 2016

Appearances and goals by club, season and competition
Club	Season	League			National cup (Note: Includes Croatian Cup, DFB-Pokal)		Continental		Total	
Club	Season	Division	Apps	Goals	Apps	Goals	Apps	Goals	Apps	Goals
Zagreb	2002–03	Croatian Football League	7	0	1	0	–		8	0
Zagreb	2003–04	Croatian Football League	21	0	1	0	2 (Note: Appearances in UEFA Intertoto Cup)	0	24	0
Zagreb	2004–05	Croatian Football League	16	1	2	0	–		18	1
Zagreb	2005–06	Croatian Football League	17	0	1	0	–		18	0
Zagreb	2006–07	Croatian Football League	30	0	3	0	–		33	0
Zagreb	2007–08	Croatian Football League	30	3	4	0	2	0	36	3
Zagreb	2008–09	Croatian Football League	21	1	5	1	–		26	2
Zagreb	Total		142	5	17	1	4	0	163	6
SC Freiburg	2009–10	Bundesliga	14	0	0	0	–		14	0
SC Freiburg	2010–11	Bundesliga	32	0	2	0	–		34	0
SC Freiburg	2011–12	Bundesliga	14	1	1	0	–		15	1
SC Freiburg	2012–13	Bundesliga	23	0	3	0	–		26	0
SC Freiburg	2013–14	Bundesliga	7	0	1	0	0	0	8	0
SC Freiburg	2014–15	Bundesliga	10	0	2	0	–		12	0
SC Freiburg	2015–16	2. Bundesliga	18	0	2	0	–		20	0
SC Freiburg	Total		118	1	11	0	0	0	129	1
Career total			260	6	28	1	4	0	292	7

=== International ===
As of match played 13 November 2015

Appearances and goals by national team and year
National team	Year	Apps	Goals
Bosnia and Herzegovina
Bosnia and Herzegovina	2010	4	0
Bosnia and Herzegovina	2011	8	0
Bosnia and Herzegovina	2012	6	0
Bosnia and Herzegovina	2013	3	0
Bosnia and Herzegovina	2014	9	0
Bosnia and Herzegovina	2015	7	0
Total		37	0

== Honours ==
SC Freiburg

- 2. Bundesliga: 2015–16
