= Manuel Schoppel =

German footballer

Personal information
- Date of birth: 30 October 1980 (age 46)
- Place of birth: Weißenhorn, West Germany
- Height: 1.85 m (6 ft 1 in)
- Position: Goalkeeper

Youth career
- SSV Ulm
- SC Freiburg

Senior career*
Years	Team	Apps	(Gls)
1999–2002	SC Freiburg	1	(0)
2002–2004	1. FC Schweinfurt 05	15	(0)
2004–2008	TSV Crailsheim		
2008–2010	FV Illertissen		
- * Club domestic league appearances and goals

Manuel Schoppel (born 30 October 1980) is a German former professional footballer who played as a goalkeeper. He made his debut on the professional league level in the Bundesliga for SC Freiburg on 4 May 2002 when he came on as a half-time substitute in a game against Hamburger SV.
