= Oliver Barth =

German footballer (born 1979)

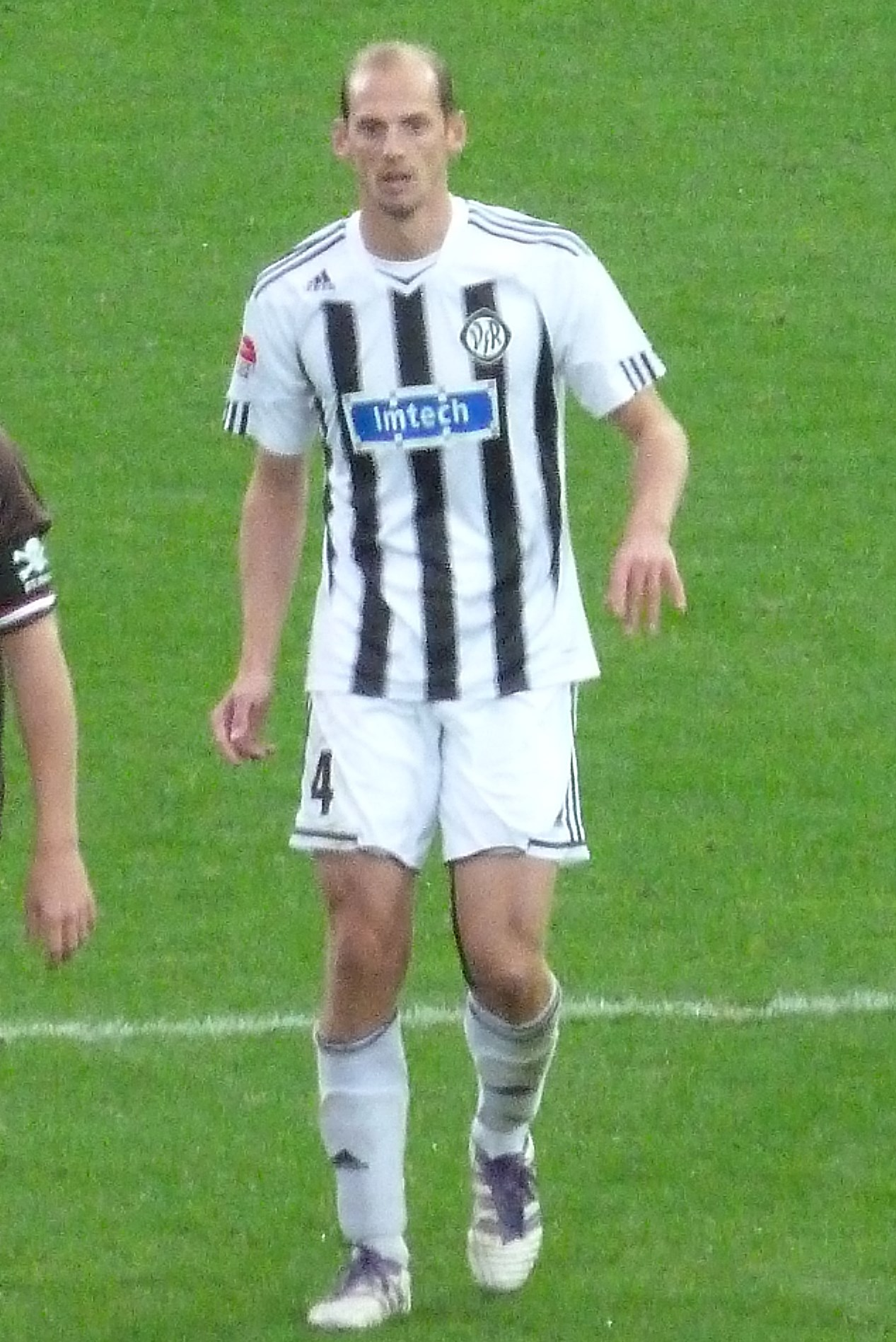
- Barth in 2012

Personal information
- Date of birth: 6 October 1979 (age 47)
- Place of birth: Stuttgart, West Germany
- Height: 1.87 m (6 ft 2 in)
- Position: Defender

Youth career
- TSV Schmiden
- VfB Stuttgart
- –2001: SV Fellbach

Senior career*
Years	Team	Apps	(Gls)
2001–2005	Stuttgarter Kickers	106	(4)
2005–2007	Fortuna Düsseldorf	44	(1)
2007–2012	SC Freiburg	84	(2)
2012–2016	VfR Aalen	117	(3)
2016	Stuttgarter Kickers	3	(0)
2016–2017	Stuttgarter Kickers II	15	(2)
Total		369	(12)

Managerial career
- 2017–2018: VfB Stuttgart II (assistant)
- 2018–2019: Greuther Fürth (assistant)
- 2019–2020: VfL Bochum (assistant)
- * Club domestic league appearances and goals

Oliver Barth (born 6 October 1979) is a German football coach and former player.

== Coaching career ==
In January 2017, Barth joined VfB Stuttgart's coaching team. He became assistant coach of the club's second team playing in the Regionalliga, under his former SC Freiburg teammate Andreas Hinkel.

On 1 July 2018, Barth joined Greuther Fürth as assistant coach to Damir Burić. In the first main round of the 2018–19 DFB-Pokal, Barth replaced Burić, who could not be there due to a bereavement in his family. In February 2019, the club sacked from Burić and Barth after the team lost 6–0 in SC Paderborn.

VfL Bochum strengthened head coach Robin Dutt's staff for the 2019–20 season with Barth as an additional assistant to enable the first assistant coach Heiko Butscher. Barth left the club on 4 January 2020.
