= Simon Pouplin =

French association football player (born 1985)

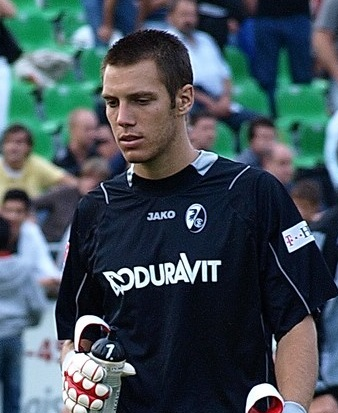
- Pouplin playing for SC Freiburg in 2008

Personal information
- Date of birth: 28 May 1985 (age 41)
- Place of birth: Cholet, France
- Height: 1.87 m (6 ft 2 in)
- Position: Goalkeeper

Youth career
- JF Cholet
- SO Cholet
- 2000–2004: Rennes

Senior career*
Years	Team	Apps	(Gls)
2004–2008	Rennes	73	(0)
2008–2011	SC Freiburg	67	(0)
2012–2014	Sochaux	51	(0)
2014–2018	Nice	9	(0)
Total		200	(0)

International career
2005	France U21	1	(0)
- * Club domestic league appearances and goals

Simon Pouplin (born 28 May 1985) is a French former professional footballer who played as a goalkeeper.

== Career ==
In 2005, Pouplin signed his first professional contract with Rennes, signing with the Breton club for three years. He made his debut in the 2003–04 Ligue 1 season. He played for Bundesliga side SC Freiburg from the 2007–08 season until the 2010–11 season. He was on trial with Évian TG from Ligue 1 in July 2011 but was not signed due to injury.

After spending one year without a team, Pouplin signed a three-year contract with Ligue 1 outfit FC Sochaux-Montbéliard in July 2012.

== Career statistics ==
Appearances and goals by club, season and competition
Club	Season	League			National cup		League cup		Europe		Total	
Club	Season	Division	Apps	Goals	Apps	Goals	Apps	Goals	Apps	Goals	Apps	Goals
Rennes	2003–04	Ligue 1	2	0	0	0	0	0	—		2	0
Rennes	2004–05	Ligue 1	0	0	0	0	0	0	—		0	0
Rennes	2005–06	Ligue 1	15	0	3	0	0	0	4	0	22	0
Rennes	2006–07	Ligue 1	38	0	0	0	3	0	—		41	0
Rennes	2007–08	Ligue 1	19	0	2	0	0	0	3	0	24	0
Rennes	Total		74	0	5	0	3	0	7	0	89	0
SC Freiburg	2008–09	2. Bundesliga	33	0	2	0	—		—		35	0
SC Freiburg	2009–10	Bundesliga	30	0	1	0	—		—		31	0
SC Freiburg	2010–11	Bundesliga	4	0	1	0	—		—		5	0
SC Freiburg	Total		67	0	4	0	—		—		71	0
Sochaux	2012–13	Ligue 1	34	0	0	0	1	0	—		35	0
Sochaux	2013–14	Ligue 1	17	0	1	0	0	0	—		18	0
Sochaux	Total		51	0	1	0	1	0	—		53	0
Nice	2014–15	Ligue 1	8	0	0	0	1	0	—		9	0
Nice	2015–16	Ligue 1	1	0	0	0	0	0	—		1	0
Nice	2016–17	Ligue 1	0	0	0	0	0	0	0	0	0	0
Nice	2017–18	Ligue 1	0	0	0	0	0	0	—		0	0
Nice	Total		9	0	0	0	1	0	0	0	10	0
Career total			201	0	10	0	5	0	7	0	223	0
