= Yacine Abdessadki =

Moroccan footballer (born 1981)

Personal information
- Date of birth: 1 January 1981 (age 45)
- Place of birth: Nice, France
- Height: 1.75 m (5 ft 9 in)
- Position: Winger

Senior career*
Years	Team	Apps	(Gls)
1997–1998	Toulon	0	(0)
1998–2004	Strasbourg B	86	(11)
1999–2008	Strasbourg	135	(12)
2002–2003	→ Grenoble (loan)	18	(1)
2005–2006	→ Toulouse (loan)	9	(0)
2008–2011	SC Freiburg	87	(5)
2015–2016	SR Colmar		
Total		335	(29)

International career
2004–2008	Morocco	9	(1)
- * Club domestic league appearances and goals

Yacine Abdessadki (born 1 January 1981) is a former professional footballer who played as winger. Born in France, he represented Morocco at international level.

== Career ==
Born in Nice, Provence-Alpes-Côte d'Azur, Abdessadki holds French and Moroccan nationalities.

He started his professional career at Strasbourg where he went on to spend most of his career. He arrived at Strasbourg age 17, and after a loan spell with Grenoble Foot 38 in Ligue 2, returned to star for the club. While at Strasbourg Abdessadki played as they won the 2005 Coupe de la Ligue Final.

In 2008, Abdessadki moved across the border to Germany signing with Bundesliga side SC Freiburg. He was involved in an altercation where he bit FC St. Pauli player Thomas Meggle in an April 2009 league match.

In December 2011, his contract with SC Freiburg was cancelled by the club after he was accused of stealing shampoo from a hotel room.

On 29 June 2015, he returned to football, signing a contract with the French lower-league club SR Colmar.
