= Robin Dutt =

German football manager (born 1965)

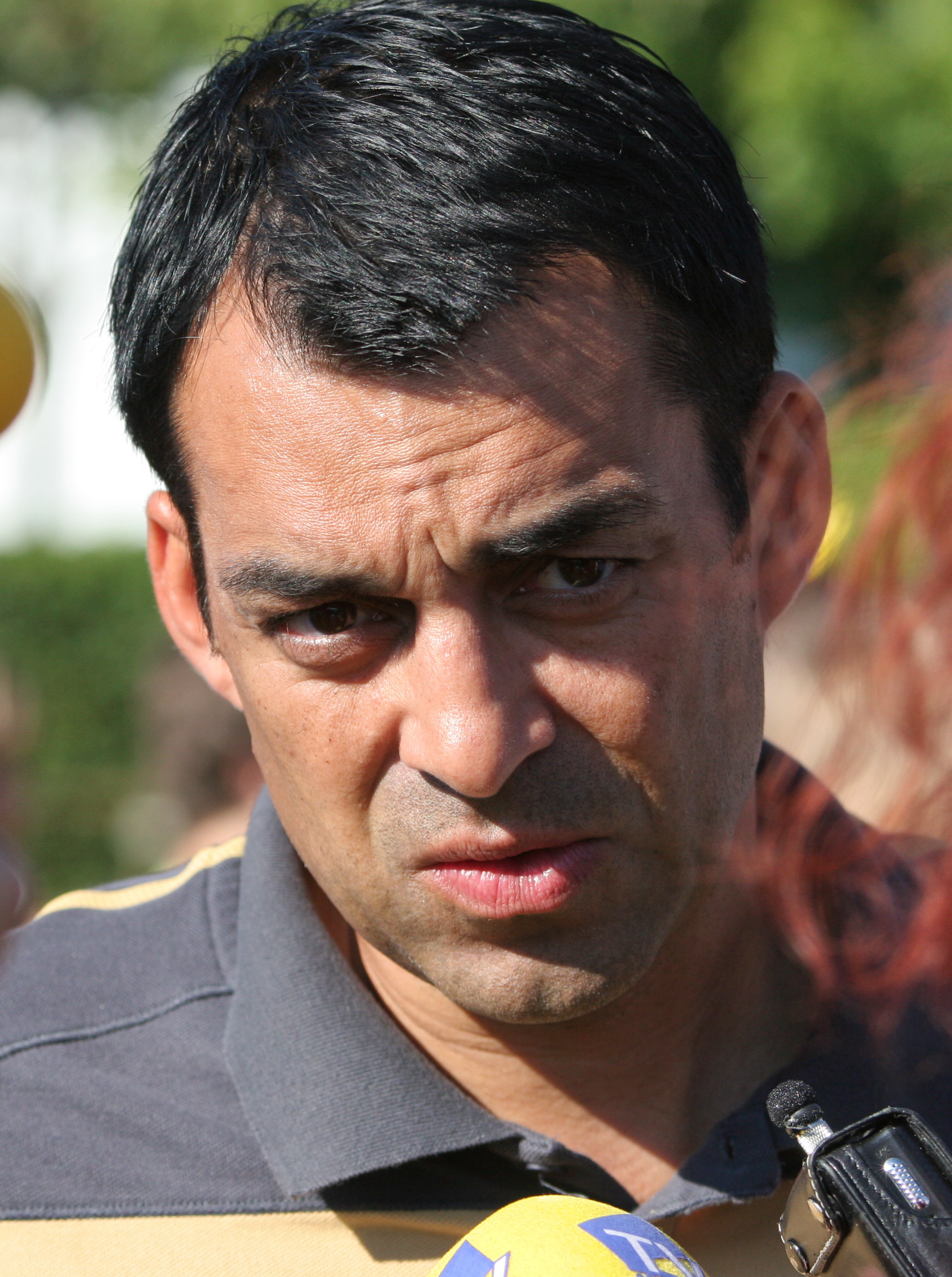
- Dutt with SC Freiburg in 2010

Personal information
- Date of birth: 24 January 1965 (age 61)
- Place of birth: Cologne, West Germany
- Position: Forward

Senior career*
Years	Team	Apps	(Gls)
1983–1985	SVGG Hirschlanden		
1985–1987	TSV Korntal		
1987–1988	TSV Münchingen		
1988–1990	TSV Korntal		
1990–1993	FV Zuffenhausen		
1993–1995	SKV Rutesheim		
1995–1999	TSG Leonberg		

Managerial career
- 1995–1999: TSG Leonberg (player-coach)
- 1999–2000: TSF Ditzingen II
- 2000–2002: TSF Ditzingen
- 2002–2003: Stuttgarter Kickers II
- 2003–2007: Stuttgarter Kickers
- 2007–2011: SC Freiburg
- 2011–2012: Bayer Leverkusen
- 2013–2014: Werder Bremen
- 2018–2019: VfL Bochum
- 2021–2023: Wolfsberger AC
- * Club domestic league appearances and goals

Robin Dutt (German pronunciation: [ʀoːbiːn dʊt]; born 24 January 1965) is a German football coach, executive and former player. He has managed many German clubs and secured promotion for SC Freiburg, returning them to the Bundesliga.

== Early life ==
Dutt was born in Köln-Lindenthal, Germany. He is the son of a German mother and an Indian Bengali father named Sabyasachi Dutt from Kolkata. His father moved to Germany in the late 1950s.

== Playing career ==
Dutt played amateur football in the fifth, sixth, and seventh divisions in Germany.

== Coaching and executive career ==
=== Early career ===
Dutt started coaching TSG Leonberg towards the end of his career as a player, and was their coach until 1999. The club gained promotion to the next division in his final year as manager. He then joined TSF Ditzingen in the 1999/2000 season, as their second team coach and was then promoted to the first team coach.

=== Stuttgarter Kickers ===
Dutt's success started to grant him local notoriety. In the summer of 2002, he joined former Bundesliga side Stuttgarter Kickers as their second team coach. The Kickers promoted Dutt as their first team coach on 28 October 2003. He went on to guide the club with a young team in the Regionalliga (third division) through difficult times as the club struggled financially. The highlight came in the 2006–07 season when the Kickers beat Bundesliga side Hamburger SV 4–3 in extra time in the DFB-Pokal.

=== SC Freiburg ===
Dutt was offered a job at the 2. Bundesliga club SC Freiburg and became coach in the summer of 2007. The previous coach, Volker Finke, had coached Freiburg for 16 years, a record in German professional football. Following an initially challenging first year, in his second year he was able to win the 2. Bundesliga title and Freiburg was back in the Bundesliga after four years.

The first season in Bundesliga with SC Freiburg saw Dutt evade relegation. They finished four points ahead of the relegation playoff spot. The 2010–11 season proved to be Dutt's last season at SC Freiburg, the club managed to hold onto the ninth position in the league table.

=== Bayer Leverkusen ===
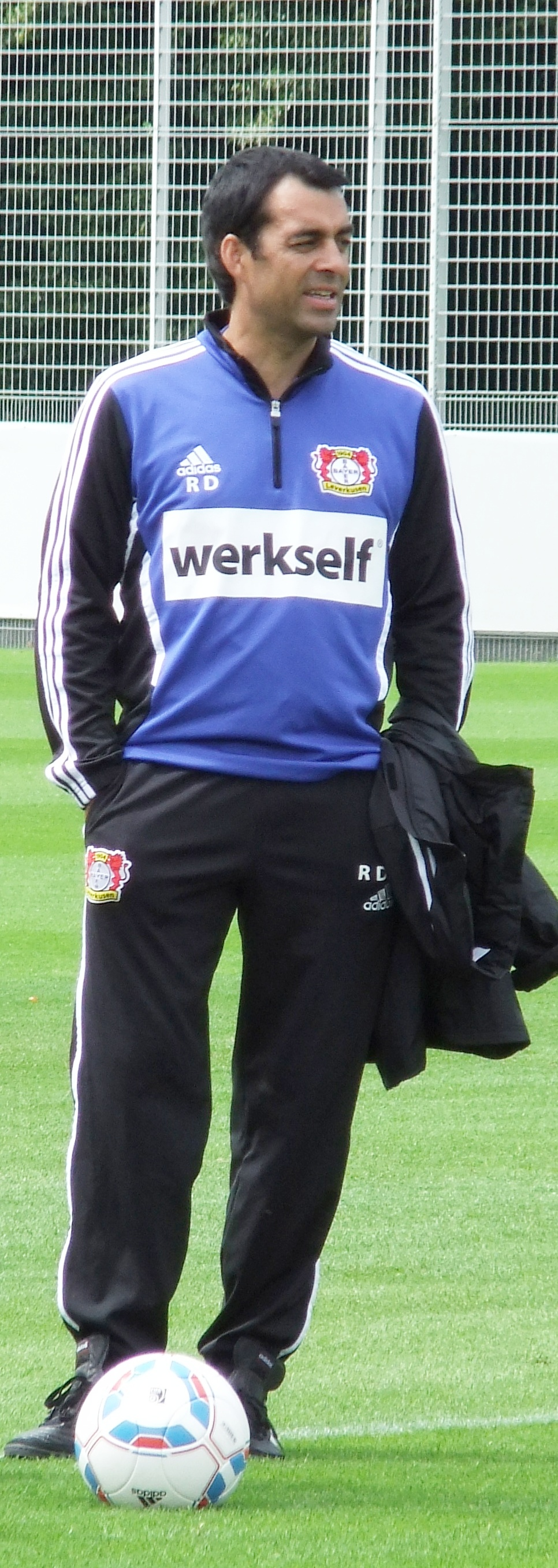
Dutt in 2011 at Bayer Leverkusen

Dutt was hired to coach Bayer 04 Leverkusen in March 2011 after previous coach, Jupp Heynckes, joined Bayern Munich. "I didn’t come to Leverkusen to turn a second-placed team into a fourth- or fifth-placed team. We came second (last season) and I want to improve on that," said Dutt when he took the reins on 19 June 2011. Dutt was dismissed from his post on 1 April 2012, after a poor run that included a 7–1 away defeat at Barcelona in the round of 16 2011–12 UEFA Champions League, in which Lionel Messi became the first player to score 5 goals in a Champions League match. Dutt was also held responsible for a streak of four consecutive Bundesliga defeats which left Leverkusen in sixth position in the Bundesliga.

=== DFB and Werder Bremen ===
In August 2012, Dutt replaced Matthias Sammer as sporting director of the German football federation (DFB).

Dutt became the new head coach of Werder Bremen on 27 May 2013. Werder Bremen dismissed Dutt on 25 October 2014.

=== Board representative for sport of VfB Stuttgart ===
On 6 January 2015, Dutt became the board representative for sport of VfB Stuttgart. In May 2016, he was fired following the team's relegation from the Bundesliga for the first time in 40 years.

=== VfL Bochum ===
On 11 February 2018 Dutt was appointed as manager of VfL Bochum. He was dismissed on 26 August 2019.

=== Wolfsberger AC ===
In April 2021 Wolfsberger AC announced, that Robin Dutt was going to be their coach from August 2021.

== Managerial statistics ==
As of match played 12 March 2023

Managerial record by team and tenure
Team	Nat	From	To	Record							
Team	Nat	From	To	G	W	D	L	GF	GA	GD	Win %
TSF Ditzingen	(Germany)	1 July 2000	30 June 2002	68	19	17	32	86	123	−37	27.94
Stuttgarter Kickers II	(Germany)	1 July 2002	27 October 2003	48	20	10	18	56	53	+3	41.67
Stuttgarter Kickers	(Germany)	27 October 2003	30 June 2007	126	49	36	41	185	160	+25	38.89
SC Freiburg	(Germany)	1 July 2007	30 June 2011	145	63	28	54	199	200	−1	43.45
Bayer Leverkusen	(Germany)	1 July 2011	1 April 2012	37	14	8	15	52	60	−8	37.84
Werder Bremen	(Germany)	27 May 2013	25 October 2014	45	11	13	21	56	94	−38	24.44
VfL Bochum	(Germany)	12 February 2018	26 August 2019	52	18	17	17	76	76	+0	34.62
Wolfsberger AC	(Austria)	1 July 2021	Present	66	29	9	28	120	111	+9	43.94
Total				588	223	138	227	830	877	−47	37.93
