= Dirk Dufner =

German football official (born 1968)

Dirk Dufner (born 20 February 1968 in Hausach) is a German football official.

== Career ==
Dufner, the son of a lawyer, did not get beyond a youth career as a football player due to a knee injury. He studied law in Freiburg im Breisgau and Bonn and completed his legal clerkship at SC Freiburg and the Cape Town Spurs F.C. (now bought by AFC Ajax) in South Africa. After unsuccessfully applying for a job at FC Barcelona, he worked in management for three years at VfB Stuttgart starting from 1997. From April 2000 to June 2004, he was Sporting director under President Karl-Heinz Wildmoser at TSV 1860 Munich. He then became self-employed as a sports lawyer in Munich.

On 24 May 2007, Dufner returned to Baden as Sporting director of SC Freiburg. Due to internal disputes, he succeeded Andreas Bornemann. In the 2008–09 season, the club qualified for the Bundesliga. In spring 2011, the sports club extended the contract with Dufner until 2014. On 22 April 2013, the manager and the club agreed to an immediate termination of the contract. On 23 April 2013, one day after the termination of the contract in Freiburg, he was presented as the new sporting director at league rivals Hannover 96. In early August 2015, shortly after the formation of the squad and the start of the season, he asked Hannover 96 to terminate his contract; the association complied with his wish.

== Personal life ==
Dufner has a daughter who lives with her mother in Frankfurt am Main.
