= Heiko Butscher =

German footballer

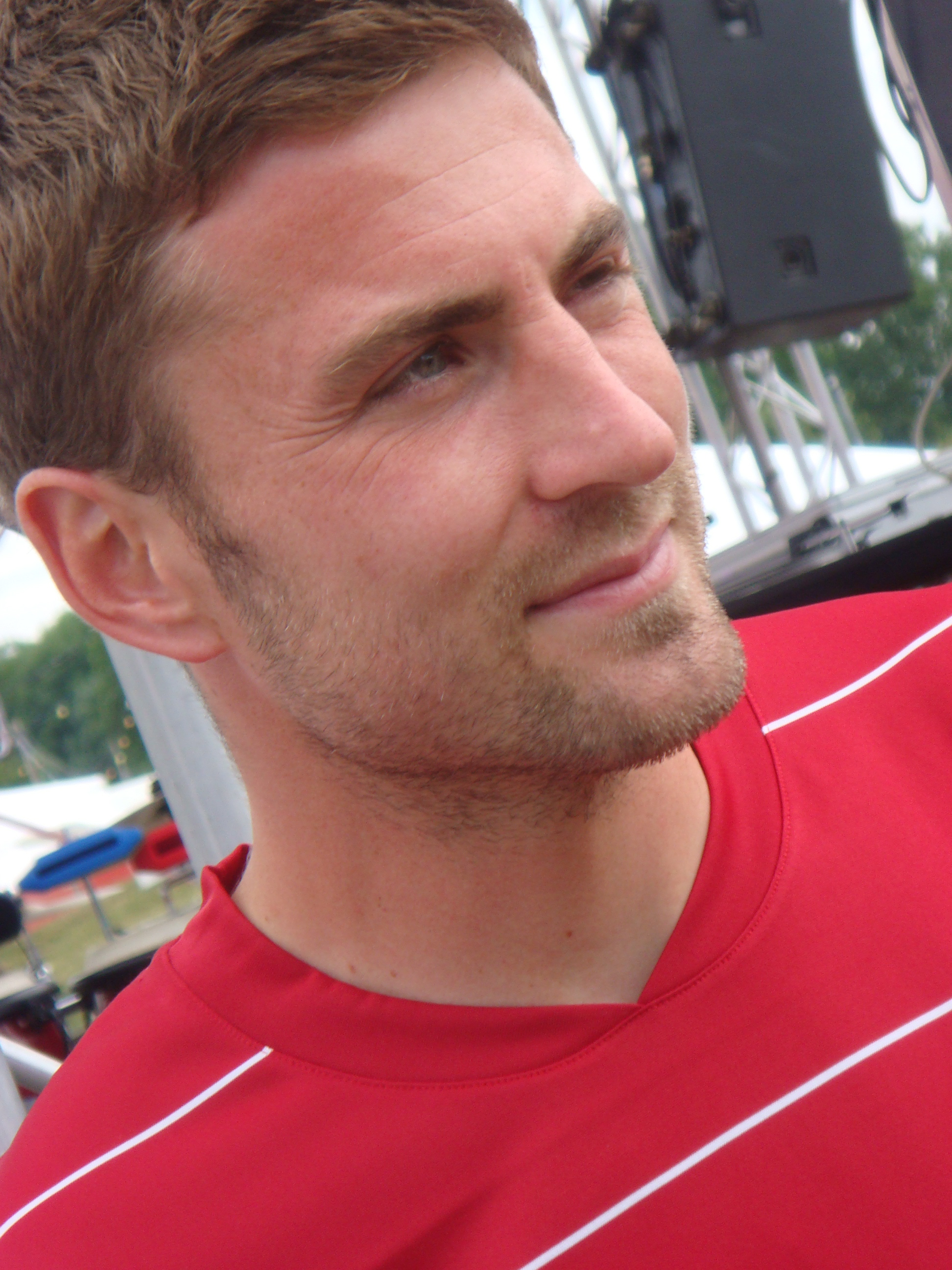
- Butscher with SC Freiburg in 2009

Personal information
- Date of birth: 28 July 1980 (age 46)
- Place of birth: Leutkirch, West Germany
- Height: 1.89 m (6 ft 2 in)
- Position: Centre back

Youth career
- SV Dietmanns
- SV Aichstetten
- SV Ellwangen

Senior career*
Years	Team	Apps	(Gls)
1998–1999	FC Wangen 1905		
1999–2002	Karlsruher SC II	96	(21)
1999–2002	Karlsruher SC	2	(0)
2002–2003	SV Sandhausen	24	(7)
2003–2004	VfB Stuttgart II	62	(9)
2005–2007	VfL Bochum	44	(2)
2007–2012	SC Freiburg	125	(9)
2011	→ SC Freiburg II	1	(0)
2012–2013	Eintracht Frankfurt	15	(0)
2013–2015	VfL Bochum	16	(3)
2013	→ VfL Bochum II	4	(0)

Managerial career
- 2018: VfL Bochum (interim)
- 2019: VfL Bochum (interim)
- 2022: VfL Bochum (interim)
- 2024: VfL Bochum (interim)
- * Club domestic league appearances and goals

Heiko Butscher (born 28 July 1980) is a German former professional footballer who played as a centre back. He was most recently the head coach of VfL Bochum.

== Career ==
Butscher joined Eintracht Frankfurt from SC Freiburg in 2012. He previously played for VfL Bochum, VfB Stuttgart II and Karlsruher SC.

== Post-playing career ==
In summer 2015 Butscher was appointed assistant coach of VfL Bochum's U16 team. In 2024, he was named the head coach of Bochum.

== Career statistics ==
=== Club ===
Appearances and goals by club, season and competition
Club	Season	League			DFB-Pokal		Total	
Club	Season	Division	Apps	Goals	Apps	Goals	Apps	Goals
Karlsruher SC II	1999–00	Regionalliga Süd	32	3	—		32	3
Karlsruher SC II	2000–01	Oberliga Baden-Württemberg	32	10	—		32	10
Karlsruher SC II	2001–02	Oberliga Baden-Württemberg	32	8	—		32	8
Karlsruher SC II	Total		96	21	0	0	96	21
Karlsruher SC	1999–00	2. Bundesliga	0	0	0	0	0	0
Karlsruher SC	2000–01	Regionalliga Süd	2	0	0	0	2	0
Karlsruher SC	2001–02	2. Bundesliga	0	0	0	0	0	0
Karlsruher SC	Total		2	0	0	0	2	0
SV Sandhausen	2002–03	Oberliga Baden-Württemberg	24	7	—		24	7
VfB Stuttgart II	2003–04	Regionalliga Süd	29	3	—		29	3
VfB Stuttgart II	2004–05	Regionalliga Süd	33	6	—		33	6
VfB Stuttgart II	Total		62	9	0	0	62	9
VfL Bochum	2005–06	2. Bundesliga	24	1	2	0	26	1
VfL Bochum	2006–07	Bundesliga	20	1	2	2	22	3
VfL Bochum	Total		44	2	4	2	48	4
SC Freiburg	2007–08	2. Bundesliga	32	4	2	0	34	4
SC Freiburg	2008–09	2. Bundesliga	31	3	3	0	34	3
SC Freiburg	2009–10	Bundesliga	29	1	2	1	31	2
SC Freiburg	2010–11	Bundesliga	25	1	1	0	26	1
SC Freiburg	2011–12	Bundesliga	8	0	1	0	9	0
SC Freiburg	Total		125	9	9	1	134	10
SC Freiburg II	2011–12	Regionalliga Süd	1	0	—		1	0
Eintracht Frankfurt	2011–12	2. Bundesliga	12	0	0	0	12	0
Eintracht Frankfurt	2012–13	Bundesliga	3	0	1	0	4	0
Eintracht Frankfurt	Total		15	0	1	0	16	0
VfL Bochum II	2013–14	Regionalliga West	4	0	—		4	0
VfL Bochum	2013–14	2. Bundesliga	10	3	0	0	10	3
VfL Bochum	2014–15	2. Bundesliga	6	0	1	0	7	0
VfL Bochum	Total		16	3	1	0	17	3
Career total			389	51	15	3	404	54

=== Managerial statistics ===
As of match played on 11 February 2018

Team	From	To	Record					
Team	From	To	G	W	D	L	Win %	Ref.
VfL Bochum (interim)	7 February 2018	11 February 2018	1	1	0	0	100.00	
