= Stefan Reisinger =

German footballer

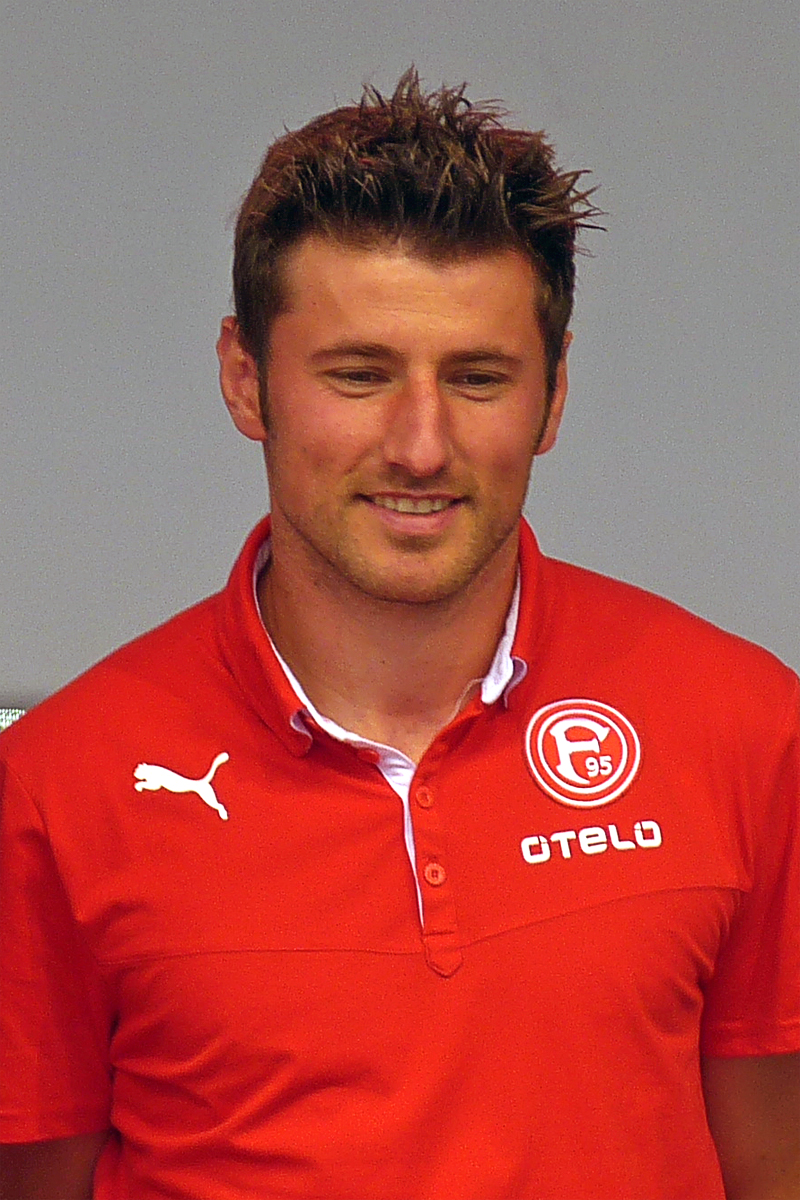
- Reisinger with Fortuna Düsseldorf in 2013

Personal information
- Date of birth: 14 September 1981 (age 45)
- Place of birth: Landshut, West Germany
- Height: 1.85 m (6 ft 1 in)
- Position: Forward

Youth career
- 1986–1993: SV Essenbach
- 1993–2000: SpVgg Landshut

Senior career*
Years	Team	Apps	(Gls)
2000–2001	SpVgg Landshut	30	(23)
2001–2003	Greuther Fürth	14	(1)
2003–2005	Wacker Burghausen	64	(24)
2005–2006	1860 Munich	25	(0)
2006–2009	Greuther Fürth	91	(27)
2009–2012	SC Freiburg	72	(10)
2012–2014	Fortuna Düsseldorf	39	(9)
2014	1. FC Saarbrücken	8	(2)
Total		343	(96)

Managerial career
- 2019: KFC Uerdingen (caretaker)
- 2019: KFC Uerdingen (caretaker)
- 2021: KFC Uerdingen (caretaker)
- 2024: Hallescher FC
- * Club domestic league appearances and goals

Stefan Reisinger (born 14 September 1981) is a German football manager and former player.

== Playing career ==
Reisinger began his career with SV Essenbach and joined in 1993 SpVgg Landshut. Until 2001, he played for Landshut and moved in the summer of the same year to SpVgg Greuther Fürth. Reisinger was then in summer 2003 transferred from Greuther Fürth to SV Wacker Burghausen and was in 2005 scouted from TSV 1860 Munich. He signed for a transfer fee of 400.000 € a contract until 30 June 2007. After one year with 1860 Munich, he wanted move to MSV Duisburg but the transfer failed and he returned to former club Greuther Fürth. On 15 April 2009, Reisinger signed a contract with SC Freiburg and joined to the club on 1 July 2009.

== Managerial career ==
On 31 January 2019, Reisinger was named caretaker manager of KFC Uerdingen for one game until he was replaced on 3 February 2019. On 25 September 2019, he was once again called up as caretaker manager for Uerdingen until 16 October 2019. On 16 October 2019, Reisinger, in a joint venture with Daniel Steuernagel, were announced as KFC Uerdingen's new managers. After they were replaced in March 2020, he was once again called up on to manager the team after Stefan Krämer got sacked. On 1 April 2024, he was named the new head coach of Hallescher FC.
