= 2013–14 Bundesliga =

51st season of the Bundesliga

Bundesliga
- Season: 2013–14
- Dates: 9 August 2013 – 10 May 2014
- Champions: Bayern Munich; 23rd Bundesliga title 24th German title
- Relegated: 1. FC Nürnberg; Eintracht Braunschweig
- UEFA Champions League: Bayern Munich; Borussia Dortmund; Schalke 04; Bayer Leverkusen
- UEFA Europa League: VfL Wolfsburg; Borussia Mönchengladbach; FSV Mainz 05
- Matches: 306
- Goals: 967 (3.16 per match)
- Top goalscorer: Robert Lewandowski (20 goals)
- Biggest home win: Hertha BSC 6–1 Eintracht Frankfurt (10 August 2013); Borussia Dortmund 5–0 SC Freiburg (28 September 2013); Borussia Dortmund 6–1 VfB Stuttgart (1 November 2013) Bayern Munich 5–0 Eintracht Frankfurt (2 February 2014)
- Biggest away win: Werder Bremen 0–7 Bayern Munich (7 December 2013)
- Highest scoring: VfB Stuttgart 6–2 Hoffenheim (1 September 2013); Borussia Dortmund 6–2 Hamburger SV (13 September 2013); Bayer Leverkusen 5–3 Hamburger SV (9 November 2013); Hoffenheim 4–4 Werder Bremen (30 November 2013); Hoffenheim 6–2 VfL Wolfsburg (2 March 2014)
- Longest winning run: 19 games Bayern Munich
- Longest unbeaten run: 28 games Bayern Munich
- Longest winless run: 17 games Nürnberg
- Longest losing run: 8 games VfB Stuttgart
- Highest attendance: 80,645; Borussia Dortmund 6–2 Hamburger SV (13 September 2013)
- Lowest attendance: 23,000; Eintracht Braunschweig 0–1 Werder Bremen (10 August 2013)
- Average attendance: 43,502

The 2013–14 Bundesliga was the 51st season of the Bundesliga, Germany's premier football league. The season began on 9 August 2013 and the final matchday was on 10 May 2014. The winter break started on 23 December 2013 and ended on 24 January 2014.

Bayern Munich were the defending champions and officially clinched the championship on 25 March 2014 after defeating Hertha BSC, on the 27th matchday of the season. This broke their previous record from last season, where Bayern clinched the Bundesliga on matchday 28.

== Teams ==
A total of 18 teams were contesting the league, including 15 sides from the 2012–13 season and two sides promoted directly from the 2012–13 2. Bundesliga season. Fortuna Düsseldorf and Greuther Fürth were relegated from the Bundesliga after a single season and were replaced by Hertha Berlin, 2. Bundesliga champions and runners-up Eintracht Braunschweig. Hertha made an immediate return to the top level, but Eintracht made their first appearance after 28 years in the second and third levels. The final participant was determined in the two-legged play-off, in which 16th placed Bundesliga side TSG 1899 Hoffenheim defeated 1. FC Kaiserslautern, who finished third in 2. Bundesliga.

2013–14 Teams

- Bayern Munich
- Borussia Dortmund
- Bayer Leverkusen
- Schalke 04
- SC Freiburg
- Eintracht Frankfurt
- Hamburger SV
- Borussia Mönchengladbach
- Hannover 96
- 1. FC Nürnberg
- VfL Wolfsburg
- VfB Stuttgart
- FSV Mainz 05
- Werder Bremen
- FC Augsburg
- TSG 1899 Hoffenheim (winner of the promotion-relegation play-off)
- Hertha BSC (2012–13 2. Bundesliga champion)
- Eintracht Braunschweig (2012–13 2. Bundesliga runner-up)

=== Stadiums and locations ===
Locations of the 2013–14 Fußball-Bundesliga teams

Team	Location	Stadium	Capacity
FC Augsburg	Augsburg	SGL arena	30,660
Bayer Leverkusen	Leverkusen	BayArena	30,210
Bayern Munich	Munich	Allianz Arena	71,000
Borussia Dortmund	Dortmund	Signal Iduna Park	80,645
Borussia Mönchengladbach	Mönchengladbach	Stadion im Borussia-Park	54,010
Eintracht Braunschweig	Braunschweig	Eintracht-Stadion	23,325
Eintracht Frankfurt	Frankfurt	Commerzbank-Arena	51,500
SC Freiburg	Freiburg	MAGE SOLAR Stadion	24,000
Hamburger SV	Hamburg	Imtech Arena	57,000
Hannover 96	Hanover	HDI-Arena	49,000
Hertha BSC	Berlin	Olympiastadion	74,244
TSG 1899 Hoffenheim	Sinsheim	Rhein-Neckar Arena	30,150
1. FSV Mainz 05	Mainz	Coface Arena	34,000
1. FC Nürnberg	Nuremberg	Grundig-Stadion	50,000
Schalke 04	Gelsenkirchen	Veltins-Arena	61,973
VfB Stuttgart	Stuttgart	Mercedes-Benz Arena	60,441
Werder Bremen	Bremen	Weserstadion	42,100
VfL Wolfsburg	Wolfsburg	Volkswagen Arena	30,000

=== Personnel and kits ===
As of 19 February 2014.

Team	Manager	Captain	Kit manufacturer	Shirt sponsor
FC Augsburg	(Germany) Markus Weinzierl	(Netherlands) Paul Verhaegh	Jako	AL-KO
Bayer Leverkusen	(Germany) Sascha Lewandowski (caretaker)	(Germany) Simon Rolfes	adidas	LG Electronics
Bayern Munich	(Spain) Pep Guardiola	(Germany) Philipp Lahm	adidas	Deutsche Telekom
Borussia Dortmund	(Germany) Jürgen Klopp	(Germany) Sebastian Kehl	Puma	Evonik
Borussia Mönchengladbach	(Switzerland) Lucien Favre	(Belgium) Filip Daems	Kappa	Postbank
Eintracht Braunschweig	(Germany) Torsten Lieberknecht	(Germany) Dennis Kruppke	Nike	SEAT
Eintracht Frankfurt	(Germany) Armin Veh	(Switzerland) Pirmin Schwegler	Jako	Alfa Romeo
SC Freiburg	(Germany) Christian Streich	(Germany) Julian Schuster	Nike	Ehrmann
Hamburger SV	(Germany) Mirko Slomka	(Netherlands) Rafael van der Vaart	adidas	Fly Emirates
Hannover 96	(Turkey) Tayfun Korkut	(United States) Steve Cherundolo	Jako	TUI
Hertha BSC	(Netherlands) Jos Luhukay	(Switzerland) Fabian Lustenberger	Nike	Deutsche Bahn
TSG 1899 Hoffenheim	(Germany) Markus Gisdol	(Germany) Andreas Beck	Puma	SAP
1. FSV Mainz 05	(Germany) Thomas Tuchel	(North Macedonia) Nikolče Noveski	Nike	Entega
1. FC Nürnberg	(Germany) Roger Prinzen	(Germany) Raphael Schäfer	adidas	NKD
Schalke 04	(Germany) Jens Keller	(Germany) Benedikt Höwedes	adidas	Gazprom
VfB Stuttgart	(Netherlands) Huub Stevens	(Germany) Christian Gentner	Puma	Mercedes-Benz Bank
Werder Bremen	(Germany) Robin Dutt	(Germany) Clemens Fritz	Nike	Wiesenhof
VfL Wolfsburg	(Germany) Dieter Hecking	(Switzerland) Diego Benaglio	adidas	Volkswagen/e-Up!

=== Managerial changes ===
Team	Outgoing manager(s)	Manner of departure	Date of vacancy	Position in table	Incoming manager(s)	Date of appointment
Werder Bremen	(Germany) Thomas Schaaf	Mutual consent	15 May 2013	14th (2012–13) (Note: Werder Bremen and Thomas Schaaf terminated their contract after the penultimate matchday of the previous season. Robin Dutt was named as the new permanent manager in the off-season.)	(Germany) Robin Dutt	27 May 2013
Bayern Munich	(Germany) Jupp Heynckes	Retirement	26 June 2013	Pre-season	(Spain) Pep Guardiola	26 June 2013 (Note: Announced on 16 January 2013.)
Bayer Leverkusen	(Finland) Sami Hyypiä & (Germany) Sascha Lewandowski	Lewandowski stepped down	30 June 2013	Pre-season	(Finland) Sami Hyypiä	30 June 2013 (Note: Announced on 15 May 2013.)
VfB Stuttgart	(Germany) Bruno Labbadia	Sacked	26 August 2013	17th	(Germany) Thomas Schneider	26 August 2013
Hamburger SV	(Germany) Thorsten Fink	Sacked	17 September 2013	15th	(Netherlands) Bert van Marwijk	22 September 2013
1. FC Nürnberg	(Germany) Michael Wiesinger	Sacked	7 October 2013	16th	(Netherlands) Gertjan Verbeek	22 October 2013
Hannover 96	(Germany) Mirko Slomka	Sacked	27 December 2013	13th	(Turkey) Tayfun Korkut	31 December 2013
Hamburger SV	(Netherlands) Bert van Marwijk	Sacked	15 February 2014	17th	(Germany) Mirko Slomka	17 February 2014
VfB Stuttgart	(Germany) Thomas Schneider	Sacked	9 March 2014	15th	(Netherlands) Huub Stevens	9 March 2014
Bayer Leverkusen	(Finland) Sami Hyypiä	Sacked	5 April 2014	4th	(Germany) Sascha Lewandowski (caretaker)	5 April 2014
1. FC Nürnberg	(Netherlands) Gertjan Verbeek	Sacked	23 April 2014	17th	(Germany) Roger Prinzen	23 April 2014

== League table ==
Pos	Team	Pld	W	D	L	GF	GA	GD	Pts	Qualification or relegation
1	Bayern Munich (C)	34	29	3	2	94	23	+71	90	Qualification for the Champions League group stage
2	Borussia Dortmund	34	22	5	7	80	38	+42	71	Qualification for the Champions League group stage
3	Schalke 04	34	19	7	8	63	43	+20	64	Qualification for the Champions League group stage
4	Bayer Leverkusen	34	19	4	11	60	41	+19	61	Qualification for the Champions League play-off round
5	VfL Wolfsburg	34	18	6	10	63	50	+13	60	Qualification for the Europa League group stage (Note: The 2013–14 DFB-Pokal finalists (Borussia Dortmund and Bayern Munich) qualified for the UEFA Champions League, thus the three Europa League places were distributed through league positions.)
6	Borussia Mönchengladbach	34	16	7	11	59	43	+16	55	Qualification for the Europa League play-off round
7	Mainz 05	34	16	5	13	52	54	−2	53	Qualification for the Europa League third qualifying round
8	FC Augsburg	34	15	7	12	47	47	0	52	
9	1899 Hoffenheim	34	11	11	12	72	70	+2	44	
10	Hannover 96	34	12	6	16	46	59	−13	42	
11	Hertha BSC	34	11	8	15	40	48	−8	41	
12	Werder Bremen	34	10	9	15	42	66	−24	39	
13	Eintracht Frankfurt	34	9	9	16	40	57	−17	36	
14	SC Freiburg	34	9	9	16	43	61	−18	36	
15	VfB Stuttgart	34	8	8	18	49	62	−13	32	
16	Hamburger SV (O)	34	7	6	21	51	75	−24	27	Qualification for the relegation play-offs
17	1. FC Nürnberg (R)	34	5	11	18	37	70	−33	26	Relegation to 2. Bundesliga
18	Eintracht Braunschweig (R)	34	6	7	21	29	60	−31	25	Relegation to 2. Bundesliga

Source: DFB
Rules for classification: 1) points; 2) goal difference; 3) number of goals scored.
(C) Champions; (O) Play-off winners; (R) Relegated

== Results ==
Home \ Away	FCA	BSC	EBS	SVW	BVB	SGE	SCF	HSV	H96	TSG	B04	M05	BMG	FCB	FCN	S04	VFB	WOB
FC Augsburg	—	0–0	4–1	3–1	0–4	2–1	2–1	3–1	1–1	2–0	1–3	2–1	2–2	1–0	0–1	1–2	2–1	1–2
Hertha BSC	0–0	—	2–0	3–2	0–4	6–1	0–0	1–0	0–3	1–1	0–1	3–1	1–0	1–3	1–3	0–2	0–1	1–2
Eintracht Braunschweig	0–1	0–2	—	0–1	1–2	0–2	0–1	4–2	3–0	1–0	1–0	3–1	1–1	0–2	1–1	2–3	0–4	1–1
Werder Bremen	1–0	2–0	0–0	—	1–5	0–3	0–0	1–0	3–2	3–1	1–0	2–3	1–1	0–7	3–3	1–1	1–1	1–3
Borussia Dortmund	2–2	1–2	2–1	1–0	—	4–0	5–0	6–2	1–0	3–2	0–1	4–2	1–2	0–3	3–0	0–0	6–1	2–1
Eintracht Frankfurt	1–1	1–0	3–0	0–0	1–2	—	1–4	2–2	2–3	1–2	0–2	2–0	1–0	0–1	1–1	3–3	2–1	1–2
SC Freiburg	2–4	1–1	2–0	3–1	0–1	1–1	—	0–3	2–1	1–1	3–2	1–2	4–2	1–1	3–2	0–2	1–3	0–3
Hamburger SV	0–1	0–3	4–0	0–2	3–0	1–1	1–1	—	3–1	1–5	2–1	2–3	0–2	1–4	2–1	0–3	3–3	1–3
Hannover 96	2–1	1–1	0–0	1–2	0–3	2–0	3–2	2–1	—	1–4	1–1	4–1	3–1	0–4	3–3	2–1	0–0	2–0
1899 Hoffenheim	2–0	2–3	3–1	4–4	2–2	0–0	3–3	3–0	3–1	—	1–2	2–4	2–1	1–2	2–2	3–3	4–1	6–2
Bayer Leverkusen	2–1	2–1	1–1	2–1	2–2	0–1	3–1	5–3	2–0	2–3	—	0–1	4–2	1–1	3–0	1–2	2–1	3–1
Mainz 05	3–0	1–1	2–0	3–0	1–3	1–0	2–0	3–2	2–0	2–2	1–4	—	0–0	0–2	2–0	0–1	3–2	2–0
Borussia Mönchengladbach	1–2	3–0	4–1	4–1	2–0	4–1	1–0	3–1	3–0	2–2	0–1	3–1	—	0–2	3–1	2–1	1–1	2–2
Bayern Munich	3–0	3–2	2–0	5–2	0–3	5–0	4–0	3–1	2–0	3–3	2–1	4–1	3–1	—	2–0	5–1	1–0	1–0
1. FC Nürnberg	0–1	2–2	2–1	0–2	1–1	2–5	0–3	0–5	0–2	4–0	1–4	1–1	0–2	0–2	—	0–0	2–0	1–1
Schalke 04	4–1	2–0	3–1	3–1	1–3	2–0	2–0	3–3	2–0	4–0	2–0	0–0	0–1	0–4	4–1	—	3–0	2–1
VfB Stuttgart	1–4	1–2	2–2	1–1	2–3	1–1	2–0	1–0	4–2	6–2	0–1	1–2	0–2	1–2	1–1	3–1	—	1–2
VfL Wolfsburg	1–1	2–0	0–2	3–0	2–1	2–1	2–2	1–1	1–3	2–1	3–1	3–0	3–1	1–6	4–1	4–0	3–1	—

Source: DFB
Legend: Blue = home team win; Yellow = draw; Red = away team win.

== Relegation play-offs ==
Hamburger SV, who finished 16th, faced SpVgg Greuther Fürth, the 3rd-placed 2013–14 2. Bundesliga side for a two-legged play-off. The winner on aggregate score after both matches earned entry into the 2014–15 Bundesliga. Hamburger SV prevailed, avoiding their possible first relegation.

=== First leg ===
15 May 2014
20:30 CEST

Hamburger SV	0–0	SpVgg Greuther Fürth
	Report

Imtech Arena, Hamburg
Attendance: 56,479
Referee: Felix Zwayer (Berlin)

Hamburg	Fürth

GK	1	(Czech Republic) Jaroslav Drobný
RB	2	(Germany) Dennis Diekmeier
CB	5	(Switzerland) Johan Djourou
CB	3	(England) Michael Mancienne
LB	19	(Czech Republic) Petr Jiráček
CM	37	(Germany) Robert Tesche	(substituted off) 60'
CM	14	(Croatia) Milan Badelj
RW	8	(Venezuela) Tomás Rincón	(substituted off) 90'
AM	23	(Netherlands) Rafael van der Vaart (c)
LW	9	(Turkey) Hakan Çalhanoğlu
CF	20	(Germany) Pierre-Michel Lasogga
Substitutions:
GK	30	(Germany) Sven Neuhaus
DF	4	(Germany) Heiko Westermann	(substituted on) 90'
DF	28	(Germany) Jonathan Tah
MF	6	(Netherlands) Ouasim Bouy
MF	7	(Germany) Marcell Jansen	(substituted on) 60'
MF	25	(Netherlands) Ola John
MF	27	(Turkey) Kerem Demirbay
Manager:
(Germany) Mirko Slomka

GK	1	(Germany) Wolfgang Hesl (c)
RB	20	(Germany) Daniel Brosinski
CB	5	(Albania) Mërgim Mavraj
CB	2	(Germany) Benedikt Röcker
LB	31	(Germany) Niko Gießelmann	(yellow card) 66'
CM	8	(Germany) Stephan Fürstner
CM	6	(Finland) Tim Sparv	(yellow card) 19'
RW	7	(Hungary) Zoltán Stieber		(substituted off) 88'
LW	18	(Ghana) Baba Rahman
CF	33	(Kosovo) Ilir Azemi		(substituted off) 85'
CF	10	(Serbia) Nikola Đurđić		(substituted off) 71'
Substitutions:
GK	39	(Germany) Tom Mickel
DF	3	(Hungary) Zsolt Korcsmár
MF	14	(Germany) Tom Weilandt		(substituted on) 71'
MF	16	(Slovenia) Goran Šukalo
MF	17	(Germany) Thomas Pledl
MF	27	(Germany) Florian Trinks		(substituted on) 88'
FW	22	(Germany) Niclas Füllkrug		(substituted on) 85'
Manager:
(Germany) Frank Kramer

Assistant referees:
Florian Steuer
Marcel Pelgrim
Fourth official:
Daniel Siebert

=== Second leg ===
18 May 2014
17:00 CEST

SpVgg Greuther Fürth	1–1	Hamburger SV
Fürstner 59'	Report	Lasogga 14'

Trolli Arena, Fürth
Attendance: 17,500
Referee: Knut Kircher (Rottenburg)

Fürth	Hamburg

GK	1	(Germany) Wolfgang Hesl (c)
RB	20	(Germany) Daniel Brosinski	(substituted off) 88'
CB	5	(Albania) Mërgim Mavraj
CB	2	(Germany) Benedikt Röcker
LB	18	(Ghana) Baba Rahman
CM	8	(Germany) Stephan Fürstner
CM	6	(Finland) Tim Sparv	(substituted off) 78'
RW	7	(Hungary) Zoltán Stieber
LW	14	(Germany) Tom Weilandt
CF	10	(Serbia) Nikola Đurđić	(substituted off) 72'
CF	33	(Kosovo) Ilir Azemi
Substitutions:
GK	30	(Netherlands) Mark Flekken
DF	3	(Hungary) Zsolt Korcsmár
MF	16	(Slovenia) Goran Šukalo	(substituted on) 78'
MF	17	(Germany) Thomas Pledl
MF	21	(Germany) Robert Zillner
FW	9	(Serbia) Ognjen Mudrinski	(substituted on) 88'
FW	22	(Germany) Niclas Füllkrug	(substituted on) 72'
Manager:
(Germany) Frank Kramer

GK	1	(Czech Republic) Jaroslav Drobný
RB	2	(Germany) Dennis Diekmeier
CB	5	(Switzerland) Johan Djourou	(substituted off) 31'
CB	4	(Germany) Heiko Westermann
LB	19	(Czech Republic) Petr Jiráček
CM	14	(Croatia) Milan Badelj
CM	18	(Germany) Tolgay Arslan	(substituted off) 64'
RW	9	(Turkey) Hakan Çalhanoğlu
AM	23	(Netherlands) Rafael van der Vaart (c)	(substituted off) 75'
LW	7	(Germany) Marcell Jansen
CF	20	(Germany) Pierre-Michel Lasogga
Substitutions:
GK	30	(Germany) Sven Neuhaus
DF	3	(England) Michael Mancienne	(substituted on) 31'
DF	28	(Germany) Jonathan Tah
MF	8	(Venezuela) Tomás Rincón	(substituted on) 64'
MF	27	(Turkey) Kerem Demirbay
MF	37	(Germany) Robert Tesche	(substituted on) 75'
FW	31	(Cameroon) Jacques Zoua
Manager:
(Germany) Mirko Slomka

Assistant referees:
Robert Kempter
Thorsten Schiffner
Fourth official:
Guido Winkmann

1–1 on aggregate. Hamburg won on away goals.

== Statistics ==
=== Top scorers ===
As of 10 May 2014

Rank	Player	Club	Goals
1	(Poland) Robert Lewandowski	Borussia Dortmund	20
2	(Croatia) Mario Mandžukić	Bayern Munich	18
3	(Switzerland) Josip Drmić	1. FC Nürnberg	17
4	(Brazil) Roberto Firmino	1899 Hoffenheim	16
4	(Colombia) Adrián Ramos	Hertha BSC	16
4	(Germany) Marco Reus	Borussia Dortmund	16
7	(Germany) Stefan Kießling	Bayer Leverkusen	15
7	(Japan) Shinji Okazaki	Mainz 05	15
7	(Brazil) Raffael	Borussia Mönchengladbach	15
10	(Croatia) Ivica Olić	VfL Wolfsburg	14

== Awards ==
=== Annual awards ===
Award	Winner	Club	Ref.
VDV Player of the Season	(Germany) Marco Reus	Borussia Dortmund	
VDV Coach of the Season	(Germany) Markus Weinzierl	FC Augsburg	
VDV Newcomer of the Season	(Germany) André Hahn	FC Augsburg	
Top scorer	(Poland) Robert Lewandowski	Borussia Dortmund	
German Footballer of the Year	(Germany) Manuel Neuer	Bayern Munich	

Team of the Year
Goalkeeper	(Germany) Manuel Neuer (Bayern Munich)			
Defenders	(Japan) Atsuto Uchida (Schalke 04)	(Greece) Sokratis (Borussia Dortmund)	(Germany) Mats Hummels (Borussia Dortmund)	(Austria) David Alaba (Bayern Munich)
Midfielders	(Turkey) Nuri Şahin (Borussia Dortmund)		(Netherlands) Arjen Robben (Bayern Munich)	(Germany) Philipp Lahm (Bayern Munich)
Forwards	(Germany) Marco Reus (Borussia Dortmund)		(Poland) Robert Lewandowski (Borussia Dortmund)	(France) Franck Ribéry (Bayern Munich)

== Attendances ==
No.	Team	Matches	Total	Average
1	Borussia Dortmund	17	1,365,050	80,297
2	Bayern München	17	1,207,000	71,000
3	Schalke 04	17	1,046,677	61,569
4	Borussia Mönchengladbach	17	888,062	52,239
5	Hertha BSC	17	882,120	51,889
6	Hamburger SV	17	881,027	51,825
7	VfB Stuttgart	17	858,469	50,498
8	Eintracht Frankfurt	17	799,900	47,053
9	Hannover 96	17	776,300	45,665
10	Werder Bremen	17	691,162	40,657
11	1. FC Nürnberg	17	687,006	40,412
12	Mainz 05	17	526,722	30,984
13	FC Augsburg	17	498,018	29,295
14	Bayer Leverkusen	17	483,689	28,452
15	VfL Wolfsburg	17	476,374	28,022
16	1899 Hoffenheim	17	457,411	26,907
17	SC Freiburg	17	397,700	23,394
18	Eintracht Braunschweig	17	387,583	22,799
