= 2012–13 Bundesliga =

50th season of the Bundesliga

Bundesliga
- Season: 2012–13
- Dates: 24 August 2012 – 18 May 2013
- Champions: Bayern Munich; 22nd Bundesliga title 23rd German title
- Relegated: Fortuna Düsseldorf; Greuther Fürth
- Champions League: Bayern Munich; Borussia Dortmund; Bayer Leverkusen; Schalke 04
- Europa League: SC Freiburg; Eintracht Frankfurt; VfB Stuttgart (via domestic cup)
- Matches: 306
- Goals: 898 (2.93 per match)
- Top goalscorer: Stefan Kießling (25 goals)
- Biggest home win: Bayern Munich 9–2 Hamburger SV
- Biggest away win: Fortuna Düsseldorf 0–5 Bayern Munich; Werder Bremen 0–5 Borussia Dortmund; Greuther Fürth 1–6 Borussia Dortmund; Hannover 96 1–6 Bayern Munich
- Highest scoring: Bayern Munich 9–2 Hamburger SV
- Longest winning run: 14 games Bayern Munich
- Longest unbeaten run: 25 games Bayern Munich
- Longest winless run: 17 games Greuther Fürth
- Longest losing run: 6 games 1899 Hoffenheim
- Highest attendance: 80,645; 12 games
- Lowest attendance: 14,425; Greuther Fürth 0–3 Mainz 05
- Average attendance: 42,421

The 2012–13 Bundesliga was the 50th season of the Bundesliga, Germany's premier football league. The season began on 24 August 2012 with the season opening match at Westfalenstadion involving defending champions Borussia Dortmund and SV Werder Bremen and ended with the last games on 18 May 2013, with a winter break between the weekends around 15 December 2012 and 19 January 2013. Bayern Munich managed to secure the championship of the 2012–13 season after only 28 match days, beating their previous record by two matches.

The league comprises eighteen teams: The best fifteen teams of the 2011–12 season, the best two teams from the 2011–12 2. Bundesliga and the winners of the relegation play-off between the 16th-placed Bundesliga team and the third-placed 2. Bundesliga team.

== Teams ==
1. FC Köln and 1. FC Kaiserslautern were relegated to the 2012–13 2. Bundesliga after finishing in one of the bottom two spots at the end of the 2011–12 season. Köln were relegated to the second level after four Bundesliga seasons, while Kaiserslautern ended a two-year tenure in the top flight.

The two relegated teams were replaced by SpVgg Greuther Fürth and Eintracht Frankfurt. Greuther Fürth made their Bundesliga debut while also returning to the top level after 49 seasons, as predecessors SpVgg Fürth missed out on qualification for the Bundesliga at the end of the 1962–63 season. In turn, Eintracht Frankfurt made an immediate comeback to the league after being relegated at the end of the 2010–11 season.

A further place in the league was determined by a two-legged play-off between Hertha BSC, the 16th-placed team of the 2011–12 season, and Fortuna Düsseldorf, the third-placed team of the 2011–12 2. Bundesliga. Düsseldorf won the play-off by 4–3 on aggregate; the club returned to the top level after 15 years in lower levels of the league pyramid. Hertha made only a cameo appearance in the league and immediately dropped back to the 2. Bundesliga.

=== Stadiums and locations ===
Promotees SpVgg Greuther Fürth expanded the capacity of their Trolli Arena to 18,000 spectators in order to guarantee all matches of the campaign being played at their own ground. Bayern Munich also expanded the capacity of their Allianz Arena by 2,000 people; the new total capacity for the ground is 71,000 spectators.

Locations of the 2012–13 Fußball-Bundesliga teams

Team	Location	Stadium	Capacity
FC Augsburg	Augsburg	SGL arena	30,660
Bayer Leverkusen	Leverkusen	BayArena	30,210
Bayern Munich	Munich	Allianz Arena	71,000
Borussia Dortmund	Dortmund	Signal Iduna Park	80,645
Borussia Mönchengladbach	Mönchengladbach	Borussia-Park	54,010
Eintracht Frankfurt	Frankfurt	Commerzbank-Arena	51,500
Fortuna Düsseldorf	Düsseldorf	Esprit Arena	54,600
SC Freiburg	Freiburg	Dreisamstadion	24,000
SpVgg Greuther Fürth	Fürth	Trolli Arena	18,000
Hamburger SV	Hamburg	Imtech Arena	57,000
Hannover 96	Hanover	AWD-Arena	49,000
TSG 1899 Hoffenheim	Sinsheim	Rhein-Neckar Arena	30,150
Mainz 05	Mainz	Coface Arena	34,000
1. FC Nürnberg	Nuremberg	Frankenstadion	50,000
FC Schalke 04	Gelsenkirchen	Veltins-Arena	61,673
VfB Stuttgart	Stuttgart	Mercedes-Benz Arena	60,300
SV Werder Bremen	Bremen	Weserstadion	42,100
VfL Wolfsburg	Wolfsburg	Volkswagen Arena	30,000

=== Personnel and kits ===
Borussia Dortmund changed their kit suppliers from Kappa to Puma, signing a contract through the 2019–20 season with the German sports brand. Furthermore, a couple of shirt sponsoring contracts were not renewed. VfB Stuttgart replaced the Gazi brand of dairy product company garmo with the banking section of automobile company Mercedes-Benz as their new shirt sponsors, and Fortuna Düsseldorf changed from home retail chain Bauhaus to discount phone company o.tel.o.

Three further clubs finalized new sponsoring contracts shortly before the first matches were played. Fraport chose not to renew their contract with Eintracht Frankfurt; the Hessian club announced a deal with brewery Krombacher at the end of July. Elsewhere, the agreements between 1. FC Nürnberg and Areva and between Werder Bremen and Targobank expired. Werder announced their new main sponsor to be poultry giant Wiesenhof in early August 2012, despite prolonged protests due to the company's suspected animal abuse. Finally, Nürnberg agreed to a multi-year contract with clothing retailers NKD just days before the start of the season.

Team	Manager	Captain	Kit manufacturer	Shirt sponsor
FC Augsburg	(Germany) Markus Weinzierl	(Netherlands) Paul Verhaegh	Jako	AL-KO
Bayer Leverkusen	(Finland) Sami Hyypiä (Germany) Sascha Lewandowski	(Germany) Simon Rolfes	adidas	SunPower
Bayern Munich	(Germany) Jupp Heynckes	(Germany) Philipp Lahm	Adidas	T-Mobile
Borussia Dortmund	(Germany) Jürgen Klopp	(Germany) Sebastian Kehl	Puma	Evonik
Borussia Mönchengladbach	(Switzerland) Lucien Favre	(Belgium) Filip Daems	Lotto	Postbank
Eintracht Frankfurt	(Germany) Armin Veh	(Switzerland) Pirmin Schwegler	Jako	Krombacher
Fortuna Düsseldorf	(Germany) Norbert Meier	(Germany) Andreas Lambertz	Puma	o.tel.o
SC Freiburg	(Germany) Christian Streich	(Germany) Julian Schuster	Nike	Ehrmann
SpVgg Greuther Fürth	(Germany) Frank Kramer	(Albania) Mërgim Mavraj	Jako	Ergo Direkt
Hamburger SV	(Germany) Thorsten Fink	(Netherlands) Rafael van der Vaart	adidas	Fly Emirates
Hannover 96	(Germany) Mirko Slomka	(United States) Steve Cherundolo	Jako	TUI
TSG 1899 Hoffenheim	(Germany) Markus Gisdol	(Germany) Andreas Beck	Puma	Suntech
1. FSV Mainz 05	(Germany) Thomas Tuchel	(North Macedonia) Nikolče Noveski	Nike	Entega
1. FC Nürnberg	(Germany) Michael Wiesinger	(Germany) Raphael Schäfer	adidas	NKD
FC Schalke 04	(Germany) Jens Keller (caretaker)	(Germany) Benedikt Höwedes	adidas	Gazprom
VfB Stuttgart	(Germany) Bruno Labbadia	(Germany) Serdar Tasci	Puma	Mercedes-Benz Bank
SV Werder Bremen	(Germany) Wolfgang Rolff (caretaker)	(Germany) Clemens Fritz	Nike	Wiesenhof
VfL Wolfsburg	(Germany) Dieter Hecking	(Switzerland) Diego Benaglio	adidas	Volkswagen/Golf/Golf GTI (in cup matches)

=== Managerial changes ===
Team	Outgoing manager	Manner of departure	Date of vacancy	Position in table	Incoming manager	Date of appointment
FC Augsburg	(Netherlands) Jos Luhukay	Resigned	5 May 2012	Pre-season	(Germany) Markus Weinzierl	17 May 2012
VfL Wolfsburg	(Germany) Felix Magath	Mutual consent	25 October 2012	18th	(Germany) Dieter Hecking	22 December 2012
TSG 1899 Hoffenheim	(Germany) Markus Babbel	Sacked	3 December 2012	16th	(Germany) Marco Kurz	1 January 2013
Schalke 04	(Netherlands) Huub Stevens	Sacked	16 December 2012	7th	(Germany) Jens Keller	16 December 2012
1. FC Nürnberg	(Germany) Dieter Hecking	Signed by VfL Wolfsburg	22 December 2012	14th	(Germany) Michael Wiesinger	24 December 2012
Greuther Fürth	(Germany) Mike Büskens	Sacked	20 February 2013	18th	(Germany) Frank Kramer	11 March 2013
TSG 1899 Hoffenheim	(Germany) Marco Kurz	Sacked	2 April 2013	17th	(Germany) Markus Gisdol	2 April 2013
Werder Bremen	(Germany) Thomas Schaaf	Mutual consent	15 May 2013	14th	(Germany) Wolfgang Rolff	15 May 2013

== League table ==
Pos	Team	Pld	W	D	L	GF	GA	GD	Pts	Qualification or relegation
1	Bayern Munich (C)	34	29	4	1	98	18	+80	91	Qualification for the Champions League group stage
2	Borussia Dortmund	34	19	9	6	81	42	+39	66	Qualification for the Champions League group stage
3	Bayer Leverkusen	34	19	8	7	65	39	+26	65	Qualification for the Champions League group stage
4	Schalke 04	34	16	7	11	58	50	+8	55	Qualification for the Champions League play-off round
5	SC Freiburg	34	14	9	11	45	40	+5	51	Qualification for the Europa League group stage
6	Eintracht Frankfurt	34	14	9	11	49	46	+3	51	Qualification for the Europa League play-off round
7	Hamburger SV	34	14	6	14	42	53	−11	48	
8	Borussia Mönchengladbach	34	12	11	11	45	49	−4	47	
9	Hannover 96	34	13	6	15	60	62	−2	45	
10	1. FC Nürnberg	34	11	11	12	39	47	−8	44	
11	VfL Wolfsburg	34	10	13	11	47	52	−5	43	
12	VfB Stuttgart	34	12	7	15	37	55	−18	43	Qualification for the Europa League third qualifying round (Note: VfB Stuttgart qualified for the Europa League by playing Champions League-qualified Bayern Munich in the 2012–13 DFB-Pokal final. Since they lost, they entered the third qualifying round, and the fifth- and sixth-placed team of the 2012–13 Bundesliga entered the group stage and play-off round respectively.)
13	Mainz 05	34	10	12	12	42	44	−2	42	
14	Werder Bremen	34	8	10	16	50	66	−16	34	
15	FC Augsburg	34	8	9	17	33	51	−18	33	
16	1899 Hoffenheim (O)	34	8	7	19	42	67	−25	31	Qualification for the relegation play-offs
17	Fortuna Düsseldorf (R)	34	7	9	18	39	57	−18	30	Relegation to 2. Bundesliga
18	Greuther Fürth (R)	34	4	9	21	26	60	−34	21	Relegation to 2. Bundesliga

Source: Bundesliga.de, kicker.de
Rules for classification: 1) points; 2) goal difference; 3) number of goals scored.
(C) Champions; (O) Play-off winners; (R) Relegated

== Results ==
Home \ Away	FCA	SVW	BVB	F95	SGE	SCF	SGF	HSV	H96	TSG	B04	M05	BMG	FCB	FCN	S04	VFB	WOB
FC Augsburg	—	3–1	1–3	0–2	2–0	1–1	3–1	0–2	0–2	2–1	1–3	1–1	1–1	0–2	1–2	0–0	3–0	0–0
Werder Bremen	0–1	—	0–5	2–1	1–1	2–3	2–2	2–0	2–0	2–2	1–4	2–1	4–0	0–2	1–1	0–2	2–2	0–3
Borussia Dortmund	4–2	2–1	—	1–1	3–0	5–1	3–1	1–4	3–1	1–2	3–0	2–0	5–0	1–1	3–0	1–2	0–0	2–3
Fortuna Düsseldorf	2–3	2–2	1–2	—	4–0	0–0	1–0	2–0	2–1	1–1	1–4	1–1	0–0	0–5	1–2	2–2	3–1	1–4
Eintracht Frankfurt	4–2	4–1	3–3	3–1	—	2–1	1–1	3–2	3–1	2–1	2–1	1–3	0–1	0–1	0–0	1–0	1–2	2–2
SC Freiburg	2–0	1–2	0–2	1–0	0–0	—	1–0	0–0	3–1	5–3	0–0	1–1	2–0	0–2	3–0	1–2	3–0	2–5
Greuther Fürth	1–1	1–1	1–6	0–2	2–3	1–2	—	0–1	2–3	0–3	0–0	0–3	2–4	0–3	0–0	0–2	0–1	0–1
Hamburger SV	0–1	3–2	3–2	2–1	0–2	0–1	1–1	—	1–0	2–0	0–1	1–0	1–0	0–3	0–1	3–1	0–1	1–1
Hannover 96	2–0	3–2	1–1	3–0	0–0	1–2	2–0	5–1	—	1–0	3–2	2–2	2–3	1–6	4–1	2–2	0–0	2–1
1899 Hoffenheim	0–0	1–4	1–3	3–0	0–4	2–1	3–3	1–4	3–1	—	1–2	0–0	0–0	0–1	2–1	3–2	0–1	1–3
Bayer Leverkusen	2–1	1–0	2–3	3–2	3–1	2–0	2–0	3–0	3–1	5–0	—	2–2	1–1	1–2	1–0	2–0	2–1	1–1
Mainz 05	2–0	1–1	1–2	1–0	0–0	0–0	0–1	1–2	2–1	3–0	1–0	—	2–4	0–3	2–1	2–2	3–1	1–1
Borussia Mönchengladbach	1–0	1–1	1–1	2–1	2–0	1–1	1–0	2–2	1–0	2–1	3–3	2–0	—	3–4	2–3	0–1	1–2	2–0
Bayern Munich	3–0	6–1	1–1	3–2	2–0	1–0	2–0	9–2	5–0	2–0	1–2	3–1	1–1	—	4–0	4–0	6–1	3–0
1. FC Nürnberg	0–0	3–2	1–1	2–0	1–2	1–1	0–1	1–1	2–2	4–2	0–2	2–1	2–1	1–1	—	3–0	0–2	1–0
Schalke 04	3–1	2–1	2–1	2–1	1–1	1–3	1–2	4–1	5–4	3–0	2–2	3–0	1–1	0–2	1–0	—	1–2	3–0
VfB Stuttgart	2–1	1–4	1–2	0–0	2–1	2–1	0–2	0–1	2–4	0–3	2–2	2–2	2–0	0–2	1–1	3–1	—	0–1
VfL Wolfsburg	1–1	1–1	3–3	1–1	0–2	0–2	1–1	1–1	0–4	2–2	3–1	0–2	3–1	0–2	2–2	1–4	2–0	—

Source: DFB
Legend: Blue = home team win; Yellow = draw; Red = away team win.

== Relegation play-offs ==
1899 Hoffenheim as the 16th-placed team faced the 3rd-placed 2012–13 2. Bundesliga side 1. FC Kaiserslautern in a two-legged play-off.

23 May 2013
20:30 CEST

1899 Hoffenheim	3–1	1. FC Kaiserslautern
Firmino 11', 29'; Schipplock 67'	Report	Idrissou 58'

Rhein-Neckar Arena, Sinsheim
Attendance: 30,135
Referee: Felix Brych (Munich)

27 May 2013
20:30 CEST

1. FC Kaiserslautern	1–2	1899 Hoffenheim
Baumjohann 65'	Report	Abraham 44'; Vestergaard 74'

Fritz-Walter-Stadion, Kaiserslautern
Attendance: 49,780
Referee: Florian Meyer (Burgdorf)

1899 Hoffenheim won 5–2 on aggregate and retained its Bundesliga spot for the 2013–14 season.

== Season statistics ==
=== Top scorers ===
Rank	Player	Club	Goals
1	(Germany) Stefan Kießling	Bayer Leverkusen	25
2	(Poland) Robert Lewandowski	Borussia Dortmund	24
3	(Germany) Alexander Meier	Eintracht Frankfurt	16
4	(Bosnia and Herzegovina) Vedad Ibišević	VfB Stuttgart	15
4	(Croatia) Mario Mandžukić	Bayern Munich	15
6	(Germany) Marco Reus	Borussia Dortmund	14
7	(Germany) Thomas Müller	Bayern Munich	13
7	(Hungary) Ádám Szalai	Mainz 05	13
9	(Senegal) Mame Biram Diouf	Hannover 96	12
9	(Latvia) Artjoms Rudņevs	Hamburger SV	12
9	(South Korea) Son Heung-Min	Hamburger SV	12

=== Hat-tricks ===
Player	For	Against	Result	Date
(Hungary) Ádám Szalai	1. FSV Mainz 05	1899 Hoffenheim	3–0	27 October 2012
(Austria) Marko Arnautović	Werder Bremen	1899 Hoffenheim	4–1	2 December 2012
(Bosnia and Herzegovina) Vedad Ibišević	VfB Stuttgart	Schalke 04	3–1	8 December 2012
(Germany) Marco Reus	Borussia Dortmund	Eintracht Frankfurt	3–0	16 February 2013
(Peru) Claudio Pizarro^{4}	Bayern Munich	Hamburger SV	9–2	30 March 2013
(Netherlands) Klaas-Jan Huntelaar	Schalke 04	Hamburger SV	4–1	28 April 2013
(Sweden) Branimir Hrgota	Borussia Mönchengladbach	1. FSV Mainz 05	4–2	11 May 2013

- ^{4} Player scored 4 goals

== Awards ==
=== Individual awards ===
Award	Winner	Club	Ref.
VDV Player of the Season	(Poland) Robert Lewandowski	Borussia Dortmund	
VDV Coach of the Season	(Germany) Jupp Heynckes	Bayern Munich	
VDV Newcomer of the Season	(Germany) Max Kruse	SC Freiburg	
Top scorer	(Germany) Stefan Kießling	Bayer Leverkusen	
Player of the Year	(France) Franck Ribéry	Bayern Munich	

=== Team of the Year ===
Team of the Year
Goalkeeper	(Germany) Manuel Neuer (Bayern Munich)			
Defenders	(Japan) Atsuto Uchida (Schalke 04)	(Germany) Mats Hummels (Borussia Dortmund)	(Brazil) Dante (Bayern Munich)	(Austria) David Alaba (Bayern Munich)
Midfielders	(Germany) İlkay Gündoğan (Borussia Dortmund)	(Germany) Bastian Schweinsteiger (Bayern Munich)	(Poland) Jakub Błaszczykowski (Borussia Dortmund)	(Germany) Mario Götze (Borussia Dortmund)
Forwards	(Venezuela) Juan Arango (Borussia Mönchengladbach)		(Poland) Robert Lewandowski (Borussia Dortmund)	
