= 2013–14 FC Augsburg season =

FC Augsburg
2013–14 season
- Chairman: Walther Seinsch
- Manager: Markus Weinzierl
- Stadium: SGL arena, Augsburg, Bavaria
- Bundesliga: 8th
- DFB-Pokal: Third round
- Top goalscorer: League: André Hahn (12); All: André Hahn (12)
- Highest home attendance: 30,660
- Lowest home attendance: 27,114
- Average home league attendance: 29,295
| Home colours | Away colours | Third colours |

The 2013–14 FC Augsburg season was the 107th season in the football club's history and third consecutive season in the top flight of German football, the Bundesliga, having been promoted from the 2. Bundesliga in 2011. FC Augsburg also participated in the season's edition of the DFB-Pokal. It was the fifth season for Augsburg in the SGL arena.

== Review and events ==
=== Summer transfer window ===
Halil Altıntop transferred to FC Augsburg.

=== August ===
In August, the 2013–14 FC Augsburg season started with the first round of the DFB-Pokal. Andreas Ottl was injured during pre–season and missed the start of the season. The match was against RB Leipzig on 2 August. Augsburg won 2–0 with goals from Jan-Ingwer Callsen-Bracker and Halil Altıntop. Then Augsburg faced Borussia Dortmund in the first matchday of the Bundesliga on 10 August. Augsburg lost 4–0. Pierre-Emerick Aubameyang scored the first three goals and Robert Lewandowski added the fourth from the penalty spot. Then Augsburg went on to face Werder Bremen on 17 August. Werder Bremen won 1–0 with a goal from Mehmet Ekici. Augsburg then faced VfB Stuttgart on 25 August. Augsburg won 2–1. Augsburg got goals from Altıntop and Callsen-Bracker. Vedad Ibišević scored for Stuttgart. Augsburg finished up August against 1. FC Nürnberg on 31 August. Augsburg won 1–0 with a goal from Kevin Vogt.

=== September ===
FC Augsburg began September with matchday 5 of the Bundesliga against SC Freiburg on 14 September. Augsburg won 2–1. Halil Altıntop and Tobias Werner scored for Augsburg. Admir Mehmedi scored for Freiburg. Augsburg went on to face Hannover 96 on 21 September. Hannover won 2–1. Hannover got goals from Artur Sobiech and Szabolcs Huszti. Paul Verhaegh scored for Augsburg. Then Augsburg went on to face Preußen Münster in the second round of the DFB-Pokal. Augsburg won 3–0. Augsburg got goals from Tobias Werner and Sascha Mölders. Werner scored twice. Augsburg faced Borussia Mönchengladbach on 27 September. The match ended in a 2–2 draw. André Hahn and Arkadiusz Milik scored for Augsburg. Max Kruse and Branimir Hrgota scored for Borussia Mönchengladbach. Augsburg finished September with the draw for the third round for the DFB-Pokal on 29 September. Augsburg was drawn against Bayern Munich.

=== October ===
FC Augsburg started October with a match against Schalke 04 on 5 October. Schalke won 4–1. Sascha Mölders scored for Augsburg. Kevin-Prince Boateng, Ádám Szalai and Max Meyer scored for Schalke. Ádám Szalai scored two goals.

== Fixtures and results ==
=== Legend ===
Win Draw Loss Postponed

=== Bundesliga ===
==== League fixtures and results ====
| 10 August 2013 1 | FC Augsburg | 0–4 | BV Borussia Dortmund | Augsburg |

| 17 August 2013 2 | SV Werder Bremen | 1–0 | FC Augsburg | Bremen |

| 25 August 2013 3 | FC Augsburg | 2–1 | VfB Stuttgart | Augsburg |

| 31 August 2013 4 | 1. FC Nürnberg | 0–1 | FC Augsburg | Nürnberg |

| 14 September 2013 5 | FC Augsburg | 2–1 | SC Freiburg | Augsburg |

| 21 September 2013 6 | Hannover 96 | 2–1 | FC Augsburg | Hannover |

| 27 September 2013 7 | FC Augsburg | 2–2 | VfL Borussia Mönchengladbach | Augsburg |

| 5 October 2013 8 | FC Schalke 04 | 4–1 | FC Augsburg | Gelsenkirchen |

| 20 October 2013 9 | FC Augsburg | 1–2 | VfL Wolfsburg | Augsburg |

| 26 October 2013 10 | Bayer 04 Leverkusen | 2–1 | FC Augsburg | Leverkusen |

| 3 November 2013 11 | FC Augsburg | 2–1 | 1. FSV Mainz 05 | Augsburg |

| 9 November 2013 12 | FC Bayern Munich | 3–0 | FC Augsburg | Munich |

| 23 November 2013 13 | FC Augsburg | 2–0 | TSG 1899 Hoffenheim | Augsburg |

| 30 November 2013 14 | Hertha BSC | 0–0 | FC Augsburg | Berlin |

| 7 December 2013 15 | Hamburger SV | 0–1 | FC Augsburg | Hamburg |

| 14 December 2013 16 | FC Augsburg | 4–1 | Eintracht Braunschweig | Augsburg |

| 20 December 2013 17 | SG Eintracht Frankfurt | 1–1 | FC Augsburg | Frankfurt |

| 25 January 2014 18 | BV Borussia Dortmund | 2–2 | FC Augsburg | Dortmund |

| 1 February 2014 19 | FC Augsburg | 3–1 | SV Werder Bremen |

| 9 February 2014 20 | VfB Stuttgart | 1–4 | FC Augsburg | Stuttgart |

| 16 February 2014 21 | FC Augsburg | 0–1 | 1. FC Nürnberg | Augsburg |

| 22 February 2014 22 | SC Freiburg | 2–4 | FC Augsburg | Freiburg |

| 1 March 2014 23 | FC Augsburg | 1–1 | Hannover 96 | Augsburg |

| 8 March 2014 24 | VfL Borussia Mönchengladbach | 1–2 | FC Augsburg | Mönchengladbach |

| 14 March 2014 25 | FC Augsburg | 1–2 | FC Schalke 04 | Augsburg |

| 22 March 2014 26 | VfL Wolfsburg | 1–1 | FC Augsburg | Wolfsburg |

| 26 March 2014 27 | FC Augsburg | 1–3 | Bayer 04 Leverkusen | Augsburg |

| 29 March 2014 28 | 1. FSV Mainz 05 | 3–0 | FC Augsburg | Mainz |

| 5 April 2014 29 | FC Augsburg | 1–0 | FC Bayern Munich | Munich |

| 13 April 2014 30 | TSG 1899 Hoffenheim | 2–0 | FC Augsburg | Sinsheim |

| 19 April 2014 31 | FC Augsburg | 0–0 | Hertha BSC | Augsburg |

| 27 April 2014 32 | FC Augsburg | 3–1 | Hamburger SV | Augsburg |

| 3 May 2014 33 | Eintracht Braunschweig | 0–1 | FC Augsburg | Braunschweig |

| 10 May 2014 34 | FC Augsburg | 2–1 | SG Eintracht Frankfurt | Augsburg |

==== League table ====
| Pos | Team | Pld | W | D | L | GF | GA | GD | Pts | Qualification or relegation |
|---|---|---|---|---|---|---|---|---|---|---|
| 6 | Borussia Mönchengladbach | 34 | 16 | 7 | 11 | 59 | 43 | +16 | 55 | Qualification for the Europa League play-off round (Note: The 2013–14 DFB-Pokal finalists (Borussia Dortmund and Bayern Munich) qualified for the UEFA Champions League, thus the three Europa League places were distributed through league positions.) |
| 7 | Mainz 05 | 34 | 16 | 5 | 13 | 52 | 54 | −2 | 53 | Qualification for the Europa League third qualifying round |
| 8 | FC Augsburg | 34 | 15 | 7 | 12 | 47 | 47 | 0 | 52 | |
| 9 | 1899 Hoffenheim | 34 | 11 | 11 | 12 | 72 | 70 | +2 | 44 | |
| 10 | Hannover 96 | 34 | 12 | 6 | 16 | 46 | 59 | −13 | 42 | |

Source: DFB
Rules for classification: 1) points; 2) goal difference; 3) number of goals scored.

==== Results summary ====
| Overall | | | | | | | | Home | | | | | | Away | | | | | |
| Pld | W | D | L | GF | GA | GD | Pts | W | D | L | GF | GA | GD | W | D | L | GF | GA | GD |
|---|---|---|---|---|---|---|---|---|---|---|---|---|---|---|---|---|---|---|---|
| 17 | 7 | 3 | 7 | 21 | 25 | −4 | 24 | 5 | 1 | 2 | 15 | 12 | +3 | 2 | 2 | 5 | 6 | 13 | −7 |

Last updated: 12 January 2014.

=== DFB-Pokal ===
| 2 August 2013 Round 1 | RB Leipzig | 0–2 | FC Augsburg | Leipzig |

| 24 September 2013 Round 2 | SC Preußen Münster | 0–3 | FC Augsburg | Münster |

| 4 December 2013 Round 3 | FC Augsburg | 0–2 | FC Bayern Munich | Augsburg |

== Player information ==
=== Squad and statistics ===
==== Squad, appearances and goals ====
As of 23 November 2013

| No. | Pos | Nat | Player | Total | | Bundesliga | | DFB-Pokal | |
| No. | Pos | Nat | Player | Apps | Goals | Apps | Goals | Apps | Goals |
|---|---|---|---|---|---|---|---|---|---|
| 1 | GK | (Austria) AUT | Alex Manninger | 7 | 0 | 6 | 0 | 1 | 0 |
| 2 | DF | (Netherlands) NED | Paul Verhaegh | 14 | 1 | 12 | 1 | 2 | 0 |
| 3 | DF | (Romania) ROU | Ronny Philp | 6 | 0 | 1+3 | 0 | 0+2 | 0 |
| 4 | DF | (Germany) GER | Dominik Reinhardt | 1 | 0 | 0 | 0 | 0+1 | 0 |
| 5 | DF | (Estonia) EST | Ragnar Klavan | 13 | 0 | 11 | 0 | 2 | 0 |
| 6 | MF | (Germany) GER | Kevin Vogt | 13 | 1 | 6+5 | 1 | 1+1 | 0 |
| 7 | MF | (Turkey) TUR | Halil Altıntop | 15 | 5 | 13 | 4 | 2 | 1 |
| 8 | MF | (Austria) AUT | Raphael Holzhauser | 12 | 0 | 6+4 | 0 | 1+1 | 0 |
| 9 | FW | (Poland) POL | Arkadiusz Milik | 9 | 1 | 1+7 | 1 | 0+1 | 0 |
| 10 | MF | (Germany) GER | Daniel Baier | 15 | 0 | 13 | 0 | 2 | 0 |
| 11 | FW | (Greece) GRE | Panagiotis Vlachodimos | 1 | 0 | 0+1 | 0 | 0 | 0 |
| 13 | MF | (Germany) GER | Tobias Werner | 13 | 4 | 7+5 | 2 | 1 | 2 |
| 14 | MF | (Czech Republic) CZE | Jan Morávek | 12 | 0 | 9+2 | 0 | 1 | 0 |
| 16 | MF | (Germany) GER | Andreas Ottl | 0 | 0 | 0 | 0 | 0 | 0 |
| 17 | DF | (Canada) CAN | Marcel de Jong | 5 | 0 | 1+3 | 0 | 1 | 0 |
| 18 | DF | (Germany) GER | Jan-Ingwer Callsen-Bracker | 15 | 2 | 13 | 1 | 2 | 1 |
| 19 | DF | (Germany) GER | Matthias Ostrzolek | 13 | 0 | 12 | 0 | 1 | 0 |
| 20 | MF | (South Korea) KOR | Hong Jeong-ho | 5 | 0 | 2+3 | 0 | 0 | 0 |
| 21 | FW | (Germany) GER | Mathias Fetsch | 1 | 0 | 0+1 | 0 | 0 | 0 |
| 24 | DF | (United States) USA | Michael Parkhurst | 0 | 0 | 0 | 0 | 0 | 0 |
| 25 | FW | (Argentina) ARG | Raúl Bobadilla | 2 | 0 | 0+2 | 0 | 0 | 0 |
| 28 | MF | (Germany) GER | André Hahn | 15 | 4 | 13 | 4 | 2 | 0 |
| 29 | DF | (Germany) GER | Maik Uhde | 0 | 0 | 0 | 0 | 0 | 0 |
| 30 | GK | (Morocco) MAR | Mohamed Amsif | 3 | 0 | 2 | 0 | 1 | 0 |
| 31 | FW | (Turkey) TUR | Arif Ekin | 0 | 0 | 0 | 0 | 0 | 0 |
| 32 | DF | (Germany) GER | Raphael Framberger | 0 | 0 | 0 | 0 | 0 | 0 |
| 33 | FW | (Germany) GER | Sascha Mölders | 15 | 2 | 10+3 | 1 | 2 | 1 |
| 34 | FW | (Germany) GER | Bajram Nebihi | 0 | 0 | 0 | 0 | 0 | 0 |
| 35 | GK | (Switzerland) SUI | Marwin Hitz | 5 | 0 | 5 | 0 | 0 | 0 |
| 37 | GK | (Greece) GRE | Ioannis Gelios | 0 | 0 | 0 | 0 | 0 | 0 |

==== Minutes played ====
| Player | Total | Bundesliga | DFB-Pokal |
|---|---|---|---|
| Daniel Baier | 900 | 720 | 180 |
| Jan-Ingwer Callsen-Bracker | 900 | 720 | 180 |
| André Hahn | 881 | 713 | 168 |
| Sascha Mölders | 870 | 713 | 157 |
| Paul Verhaegh | 856 | 676 | 180 |
| Ragnar Klavan | 826 | 646 | 180 |
| Matthias Ostrzolek | 765 | 675 | 90 |
| Halil Altıntop | 743 | 594 | 149 |
| Jan Morávek | 685 | 506 | 179 |
| Raphael Holzhauser | 554 | 454 | 110 |
| Alex Manninger | 450 | 360 | 90 |
| Tobias Werner | 360 | 270 | 90 |
| Kevin Vogt | 287 | 194 | 93 |
| Mohamed Amsif | 270 | 180 | 90 |
| Marwin Hitz | 180 | 180 | 0 |
| Marcel de Jong | 135 | 45 | 90 |
| Ronny Philp | 77 | 57 | 20 |
| Arkadiusz Milik | 45 | 22 | 23 |
| Raul Bobadilla | 33 | 33 | 0 |
| Panagiotis Vlachodimos | 13 | 13 | 0 |
| Mathias Fetsch | 4 | 4 | 0 |
Last updated: 5 October 2013

=== Transfers ===
Transfers made during the 2013 summer transfer window:

List of German football transfers summer 2013 − FC Augsburg

==== In ====
| No. | Pos. | Name | Age | EU | Moving from | Type | Transfer Window | Contract ends | Transfer fee | Sources |
|---|---|---|---|---|---|---|---|---|---|---|
| 7 | MF | Halil Altıntop | 30 | No | Trabzonspor | Transfer | Summer | 2015 | Free | |

==== Out ====
| No. | Pos. | Name | Age | EU | Moving to | Type | Transfer Window | Transfer fee | Sources |
