= 2016–17 Bundesliga =

54th season of the Bundesliga

Bundesliga
- Season: 2016–17
- Dates: 26 August 2016 – 20 May 2017
- Champions: Bayern Munich; 26th Bundesliga title 27th German title
- Relegated: FC Ingolstadt; Darmstadt 98
- Champions League: Bayern Munich; RB Leipzig; Borussia Dortmund; 1899 Hoffenheim
- Europa League: 1. FC Köln; Hertha BSC; SC Freiburg
- Matches: 306
- Goals: 877 (2.87 per match)
- Top goalscorer: Pierre-Emerick Aubameyang (31 goals)
- Biggest home win: Bayern Munich 8–0 Hamburger SV
- Biggest away win: VfL Wolfsburg 0–6 Bayern Munich
- Highest scoring: RB Leipzig 4–5 Bayern Munich
- Longest winning run: 8 games RB Leipzig
- Longest unbeaten run: 17 games 1899 Hoffenheim
- Longest winless run: 12 games Hamburger SV
- Longest losing run: 8 games Darmstadt 98
- Highest attendance: 81,360; 11 games
- Lowest attendance: 13,521; FC Ingolstadt v VfL Wolfsburg
- Attendance: 12,704,627 (41,518 per match)

The 2016–17 Bundesliga was the 54th season of the Bundesliga, Germany's premier football competition. It began on 26 August 2016 and ended on 20 May 2017. Bayern Munich were the defending champions. Fixtures for the 2016–17 season were announced on 29 June 2016.

Bayern Munich won their 26th Bundesliga title with three games to spare, becoming the first team to win 5 consecutive titles. RB Leipzig became the runners-up, only a year after its promotion last season from the 2015–16 2. Bundesliga.

== Teams ==
A total of 18 teams participated in this edition of the Bundesliga. VfB Stuttgart and Hannover 96 were relegated to 2016–17 2. Bundesliga. Former Bundesliga champion Stuttgart were relegated to the second level after 39 years, whereas Hannover 96 finished a 14-year stint in the top level. They were replaced by 2. Bundesliga champion SC Freiburg and 2. Bundesliga runner-up RB Leipzig. Freiburg immediately returned to the Bundesliga, whereas RB Leipzig made its debut. Finally Eintracht Frankfurt, 16th of Bundesliga faced 1. FC Nürnberg, third of 2. Bundesliga in a Bundesliga play-off. Eintracht won 2–1 on aggregate and remained in the top level.

RB Leipzig was the first team from the former East Germany to play in the Bundesliga since the relegation of Energie Cottbus after the 2008–09 season.

=== Stadiums and locations ===
Team	Location	Stadium	Capacity	Ref.
FC Augsburg	Augsburg	WWK Arena	30,660	
Bayer Leverkusen	Leverkusen	BayArena	30,210	
Bayern Munich	Munich	Allianz Arena	75,000	
Borussia Dortmund	Dortmund	Signal Iduna Park	81,360	
Borussia Mönchengladbach	Mönchengladbach	Borussia-Park	54,057	
Darmstadt 98	Darmstadt	Jonathan-Heimes-Stadion am Böllenfalltor	17,000	
Eintracht Frankfurt	Frankfurt	Commerzbank-Arena	51,500	
SC Freiburg	Freiburg im Breisgau	Schwarzwald-Stadion	24,000	
Hamburger SV	Hamburg	Volksparkstadion	57,000	
Hertha BSC	Berlin	Olympiastadion	74,475	
1899 Hoffenheim	Sinsheim	Wirsol Rhein-Neckar-Arena	30,150	
FC Ingolstadt	Ingolstadt	Audi Sportpark	15,000	
1. FC Köln	Cologne	RheinEnergieStadion	49,968	
RB Leipzig	Leipzig	Red Bull Arena	42,959	
Mainz 05	Mainz	Opel Arena	34,000	
Schalke 04	Gelsenkirchen	Veltins-Arena	62,271	
Werder Bremen	Bremen	Weser-Stadion	42,100	
VfL Wolfsburg	Wolfsburg	Volkswagen Arena	30,000	

Locations of the 2016–17 Bundesliga teams

=== Personnel and kits ===
Team	Manager	Captain	Kit manufacturer	Shirt sponsor	Ref.
FC Augsburg	(Germany) Manuel Baum	(Netherlands) Paul Verhaegh	Nike	WWK	
Bayer Leverkusen	(Turkey) Tayfun Korkut	(Germany) Lars Bender	Jako	Barmenia Versicherungen	
Bayern Munich	(Italy) Carlo Ancelotti	(Germany) Philipp Lahm	Adidas	Deutsche Telekom	
Borussia Dortmund	(Germany) Thomas Tuchel	(Germany) Marcel Schmelzer	Puma	Evonik	
Borussia Mönchengladbach	(Germany) Dieter Hecking	(Germany) Lars Stindl	Kappa	Postbank	
Darmstadt 98	(Germany) Torsten Frings	(Turkey) Aytaç Sulu	Jako	Software AG	
Eintracht Frankfurt	(Croatia) Niko Kovač	(Germany) Alexander Meier	Nike	Krombacher	
SC Freiburg	(Germany) Christian Streich	(Bosnia and Herzegovina) Mensur Mujdža	Hummel	Schwarzwaldmilch	
Hamburger SV	(Germany) Markus Gisdol	(Japan) Gōtoku Sakai	Adidas	Fly Emirates	
Hertha BSC	(Hungary) Pál Dárdai	(Bosnia and Herzegovina) Vedad Ibišević	Nike	bet-at-home.com	
1899 Hoffenheim	(Germany) Julian Nagelsmann	(Switzerland) Pirmin Schwegler	Lotto	SAP	
FC Ingolstadt	(Germany) Maik Walpurgis	(Cameroon) Marvin Matip	Adidas	Media Markt	
1. FC Köln	(Austria) Peter Stöger	(Germany) Matthias Lehmann	Erima	REWE	
RB Leipzig	(Austria) Ralph Hasenhüttl	(Germany) Dominik Kaiser	Nike	Red Bull	
Mainz 05	(Switzerland) Martin Schmidt	(Germany) Stefan Bell	Lotto	Kömmerling	
Schalke 04	(Germany) Markus Weinzierl	(Germany) Benedikt Höwedes	Adidas	Gazprom	
Werder Bremen	(Germany) Alexander Nouri	(Germany) Clemens Fritz	Nike	Wiesenhof	
VfL Wolfsburg	(Netherlands) Andries Jonker	(Switzerland) Diego Benaglio	Nike	Volkswagen	

=== Coaching changes ===
Team	Outgoing	Manner	Exit date		Position in table	Incoming	Incoming date		Ref.
Team	Outgoing	Manner	Announced on	Departed on	Position in table	Incoming	Announced on	Arrived on	Ref.
Bayern Munich	(Spain) Pep Guardiola	End of contract	20 December 2015	30 June 2016	Pre-season	(Italy) Carlo Ancelotti	20 December 2015	1 July 2016	
FC Ingolstadt	(Austria) Ralph Hasenhüttl	Signed for RB Leipzig	6 May 2016	30 June 2016	Pre-season	(Germany) Markus Kauczinski	6 May 2016	1 July 2016	
RB Leipzig	(Germany) Ralf Rangnick	Appointed as sporting director	6 May 2016	30 June 2016	Pre-season	(Austria) Ralph Hasenhüttl	6 May 2016	1 July 2016	
Schalke 04	(Germany) André Breitenreiter	Sacked	14 May 2016	30 June 2016	Pre-season	(Germany) Markus Weinzierl	2 June 2016	1 July 2016	
FC Augsburg	(Germany) Markus Weinzierl	Signed for Schalke 04	24 May 2016	30 June 2016	Pre-season	(Germany) Dirk Schuster	2 June 2016	1 July 2016	
Darmstadt 98	(Germany) Dirk Schuster	Signed for FC Augsburg	2 June 2016	30 June 2016	Pre-season	(Germany) Norbert Meier	10 June 2016	1 July 2016	
Werder Bremen	(Ukraine) Viktor Skrypnyk	Sacked	18 September 2016		18th	(Germany) Alexander Nouri (Note: Nouri was initially appointed as interim coach for a few games, but the move was made permanent on 2 October 2016.)	18 September 2016		
Hamburger SV	(Germany) Bruno Labbadia	Sacked	25 September 2016		16th	(Germany) Markus Gisdol	25 September 2016	26 September 2016	
VfL Wolfsburg	(Germany) Dieter Hecking	Sacked	17 October 2016		14th	(France) Valérien Ismaël	17 October 2016		
FC Ingolstadt	(Germany) Markus Kauczinski	Sacked	6 November 2016		17th	(Germany) Maik Walpurgis	12 November 2016		
Darmstadt 98	(Germany) Norbert Meier	Sacked	5 December 2016		16th	(Germany) Torsten Frings	27 December 2016		
FC Augsburg	(Germany) Dirk Schuster	Sacked	14 December 2016		13th	(Germany) Manuel Baum	14 December 2016		
Borussia Mönchengladbach	(Germany) André Schubert	Sacked	21 December 2016		14th	(Germany) Dieter Hecking	21 December 2016		
VfL Wolfsburg	(France) Valérien Ismaël	Sacked	26 February 2017		14th	(Netherlands) Andries Jonker	27 February 2017		
Bayer Leverkusen	(Germany) Roger Schmidt	Sacked	5 March 2017		9th	(Turkey) Tayfun Korkut	6 March 2017		

== League table ==
Pos	Team	Pld	W	D	L	GF	GA	GD	Pts	Qualification or relegation
1	Bayern Munich (C)	34	25	7	2	89	22	+67	82	Qualification for the Champions League group stage
2	RB Leipzig	34	20	7	7	66	39	+27	67	Qualification for the Champions League group stage
3	Borussia Dortmund	34	18	10	6	72	40	+32	64	Qualification for the Champions League group stage
4	1899 Hoffenheim	34	16	14	4	64	37	+27	62	Qualification for the Champions League play-off round
5	1. FC Köln	34	12	13	9	51	42	+9	49	Qualification for the Europa League group stage (Note: Since the winners of the 2016–17 DFB-Pokal, Borussia Dortmund, qualified for the Champions League based on league position, the Europa League group stage spot was passed to the sixth-placed team, Hertha BSC; and the Europa League third qualifying round spot was passed to the seventh-placed team, SC Freiburg.)
6	Hertha BSC	34	15	4	15	43	47	−4	49	Qualification for the Europa League group stage
7	SC Freiburg	34	14	6	14	42	60	−18	48	Qualification for the Europa League third qualifying round
8	Werder Bremen	34	13	6	15	61	64	−3	45	
9	Borussia Mönchengladbach	34	12	9	13	45	49	−4	45	
10	Schalke 04	34	11	10	13	45	40	+5	43	
11	Eintracht Frankfurt	34	11	9	14	36	43	−7	42	
12	Bayer Leverkusen	34	11	8	15	53	55	−2	41	
13	FC Augsburg	34	9	11	14	35	51	−16	38	
14	Hamburger SV	34	10	8	16	33	61	−28	38	
15	Mainz 05	34	10	7	17	44	55	−11	37	
16	VfL Wolfsburg (O)	34	10	7	17	34	52	−18	37	Qualification for the relegation play-offs
17	FC Ingolstadt (R)	34	8	8	18	36	57	−21	32	Relegation to 2. Bundesliga
18	Darmstadt 98 (R)	34	7	4	23	28	63	−35	25	Relegation to 2. Bundesliga

Source: DFB
Rules for classification: 1) Points; 2) Goal difference; 3) Goals scored; 4) Head-to-head points; 5) Head-to-head goal difference; 6) Head-to-head away goals scored; 7) Away goals scored; 8) Play-off.
(C) Champions; (O) Play-off winners; (R) Relegated

== Results ==
Home \ Away	AUG	BSC	BRE	DAR	DOR	FRA	FRE	HAM	HOF	ING	KÖL	LEI	LEV	MAI	MÖN	MUN	SCH	WOL
FC Augsburg	—	0–0	3–2	1–0	1–1	1–1	1–1	4–0	0–2	2–3	2–1	2–2	1–3	1–3	1–0	1–3	1–1	0–2
Hertha BSC	2–0	—	0–1	2–0	2–1	2–0	2–1	2–0	1–3	1–0	2–1	1–4	2–6	2–1	3–0	1–1	2–0	1–0
Werder Bremen	1–2	2–0	—	2–0	1–2	1–2	1–3	2–1	3–5	2–1	1–1	3–0	2–1	1–2	0–1	1–2	3–0	2–1
Darmstadt 98	1–2	0–2	2–2	—	2–1	1–0	3–0	0–2	1–1	0–1	1–6	0–2	0–2	2–1	0–0	0–1	2–1	3–1
Borussia Dortmund	1–1	1–1	4–3	6–0	—	3–1	3–1	3–0	2–1	1–0	0–0	1–0	6–2	2–1	4–1	1–0	0–0	3–0
Eintracht Frankfurt	3–1	3–3	2–2	2–0	2–1	—	1–2	0–0	0–0	0–2	1–0	2–2	2–1	3–0	0–0	2–2	1–0	0–2
SC Freiburg	2–1	2–1	2–5	1–0	0–3	1–0	—	1–0	1–1	1–1	2–1	1–4	2–1	1–0	3–1	1–2	2–0	0–3
Hamburger SV	1–0	1–0	2–2	1–2	2–5	0–3	2–2	—	2–1	1–1	2–1	0–4	1–0	0–0	2–1	0–1	2–1	2–1
1899 Hoffenheim	0–0	1–0	1–1	2–0	2–2	1–0	2–1	2–2	—	5–2	4–0	2–2	1–0	4–0	5–3	1–0	2–1	0–0
FC Ingolstadt	0–2	0–2	2–4	3–2	3–3	0–2	1–2	3–1	1–2	—	2–2	1–0	1–1	2–1	0–2	0–2	1–1	1–1
1. FC Köln	0–0	4–2	4–3	2–0	1–1	1–0	3–0	3–0	1–1	2–1	—	1–1	1–1	2–0	2–3	0–3	1–1	1–0
RB Leipzig	2–1	2–0	3–1	4–0	1–0	3–0	4–0	0–3	2–1	0–0	3–1	—	1–0	3–1	1–1	4–5	2–1	0–1
Bayer Leverkusen	0–0	3–1	1–1	3–2	2–0	3–0	1–1	3–1	0–3	1–2	2–2	2–3	—	0–2	2–3	0–0	1–4	3–3
Mainz 05	2–0	1–0	0–2	2–1	1–1	4–2	4–2	3–1	4–4	2–0	0–0	2–3	2–3	—	1–2	1–3	0–1	1–1
Borussia Mönchengladbach	1–1	1–0	4–1	2–2	2–3	0–0	3–0	0–0	1–1	2–0	1–2	1–2	2–1	1–0	—	0–1	4–2	1–2
Bayern Munich	6–0	3–0	6–0	1–0	4–1	3–0	4–1	8–0	1–1	3–1	1–1	3–0	2–1	2–2	2–0	—	1–1	5–0
Schalke 04	3–0	2–0	3–1	3–1	1–1	0–1	1–1	1–1	1–1	1–0	1–3	1–1	0–1	3–0	4–0	0–2	—	4–1
VfL Wolfsburg	1–2	2–3	1–2	1–0	1–5	1–0	0–1	1–0	2–1	3–0	0–0	0–1	1–2	0–0	1–1	0–6	0–1	—

Source: DFB
Legend: Blue = home team win; Yellow = draw; Red = away team win.

== Relegation play-offs ==
=== First leg ===
25 May 2017
20:30 CEST

VfL Wolfsburg	1–0	Eintracht Braunschweig
Gómez 35' (pen.)	Report

Volkswagen Arena, Wolfsburg
Attendance: 29,100
Referee: Sascha Stegemann (Niederkassel)

=== Second leg ===
29 May 2017
20:30 CEST

Eintracht Braunschweig	0–1	VfL Wolfsburg
	Report	Vieirinha 49'

Eintracht-Stadion, Braunschweig
Attendance: 23,000
Referee: Tobias Stieler (Hamburg)

VfL Wolfsburg won 2–0 on aggregate and both clubs therefore remained in their respective tiers for the 2017–18 season.

== Statistics ==
=== Top scorers ===
Rank	Player	Club	Goals
1	(Gabon) Pierre-Emerick Aubameyang	Borussia Dortmund	31
2	(Poland) Robert Lewandowski	Bayern Munich	30
3	(France) Anthony Modeste	1. FC Köln	25
4	(Germany) Timo Werner	RB Leipzig	21
5	(Germany) Mario Gómez	VfL Wolfsburg	16
6	(Croatia) Andrej Kramarić	1899 Hoffenheim	15
6	(Germany) Max Kruse	Werder Bremen	15
8	(Netherlands) Arjen Robben	Bayern Munich	13
9	(Bosnia and Herzegovina) Vedad Ibišević	Hertha BSC	12
10	(Germany) Serge Gnabry	Werder Bremen	11
10	(Germany) Florian Niederlechner	SC Freiburg	11
10	(Mexico) Javier Hernández	Bayer Leverkusen	11
10	(Germany) Lars Stindl	Borussia Mönchengladbach	11
10	(Germany) Sandro Wagner	1899 Hoffenheim	11

=== Hat-tricks ===
Player	Club	Against	Result	Date
(Poland) Robert Lewandowski	Bayern Munich	Werder Bremen	6–0	26 August 2016
(Finland) Joel Pohjanpalo	Bayer Leverkusen	Hamburger SV	3–1	10 September 2016
(Mexico) Javier Hernández	Bayer Leverkusen	Mainz 05	3–2	24 September 2016
(France) Anthony Modeste	1. FC Köln	Hamburger SV	3–0	30 October 2016
(Ivory Coast) Salomon Kalou	Hertha BSC	Borussia Mönchengladbach	3–0	4 November 2016
(Gabon) Pierre-Emerick Aubameyang^{4}	Borussia Dortmund	Hamburger SV	5–2	5 November 2016
(Germany) Danny Latza	Mainz 05	Hamburger SV	3–1	17 December 2016
(Poland) Robert Lewandowski	Bayern Munich	Hamburger SV	8–0	25 February 2017
(France) Anthony Modeste	1. FC Köln	Hertha BSC	4–2	18 March 2017
(Poland) Robert Lewandowski	Bayern Munich	FC Augsburg	6–0	1 April 2017
(Denmark) Thomas Delaney	Werder Bremen	SC Freiburg	5–2	1 April 2017
(Germany) Mario Gómez	VfL Wolfsburg	Bayer Leverkusen	3–3	2 April 2017
(Germany) Max Kruse^{4}	Werder Bremen	FC Ingolstadt	4–2	22 April 2017

^{4} Player scored four goals

=== Clean sheets ===
Rank	Player	Club	Clean sheets
1	(Germany) Manuel Neuer	Bayern Munich	14
2	(Germany) Oliver Baumann	1899 Hoffenheim	12
3	(Norway) Rune Jarstein	Hertha BSC	11
4	(Finland) Lukáš Hrádecký	Eintracht Frankfurt	10
4	(Switzerland) Yann Sommer	Borussia Mönchengladbach	10
6	(Switzerland) Roman Bürki	Borussia Dortmund	9
6	(Hungary) Péter Gulácsi	RB Leipzig	9
8	(Belgium) Koen Casteels	VfL Wolfsburg	8
8	(Germany) Ralf Fährmann	Schalke 04	8
10	(Switzerland) Marwin Hitz	FC Augsburg	7

== Awards ==
=== Annual Awards ===
Award	Winner	Club / Details
Rookie of the Season	(France) Ousmane Dembélé	Borussia Dortmund
Top Scorer (Torjägerkanone)	(Gabon) Pierre-Emerick Aubameyang	Borussia Dortmund (31 goals)
Top Assist Provider	(Sweden) Emil Forsberg	RB Leipzig (22 assists)
Footballer of the Year (Germany)	(Germany) Philipp Lahm	Bayern Munich
VDV Player of the Season	(Gabon) Pierre-Emerick Aubameyang	Borussia Dortmund
VDV Manager of the Season	(Germany) Julian Nagelsmann	Hoffenheim

Team of the Year
Goalkeeper	(Germany) Manuel Neuer (Bayern Munich)			
Defenders	(Poland) Łukasz Piszczek (Borussia Dortmund)	(Germany) Mats Hummels (Bayern Munich)	(Germany) Niklas Süle (Hoffenheim)	(Bosnia and Herzegovina) Sead Kolašinac (Schalke 04)
Midfielders	(France) Ousmane Dembélé (Borussia Dortmund)	(Spain) Thiago (Bayern Munich)	(Guinea) Naby Keïta (RB Leipzig)	(Sweden) Emil Forsberg (RB Leipzig)
Forwards	(Gabon) Pierre-Emerick Aubameyang (Borussia Dortmund)		(Poland) Robert Lewandowski (Bayern Munich)	

== Attendances ==
Rank	Team	Home games	Average attendance
1	Borussia Dortmund	17	79,653
2	Bayern München	17	75,000
3	Schalke 04	17	60,703
4	Hamburger SV	17	52,341
5	Borussia Mönchengladbach	17	51,494
6	Hertha BSC	17	50,267
7	1. FC Köln	17	49,571
8	Eintracht Frankfurt	17	49,165
9	RB Leipzig	17	41,455
10	Werder Bremen	17	40,881
11	Mainz 05	17	29,096
12	Bayer Leverkusen	17	28,428
13	FC Augsburg	17	28,172
14	TSG Hoffenheim	17	28,155
15	VfL Wolfsburg	17	27,586
16	SC Freiburg	17	23,959
17	Darmstadt 98	17	16,753
18	FC Ingolstadt	17	14,601
