= Sven Neuhaus =

German footballer

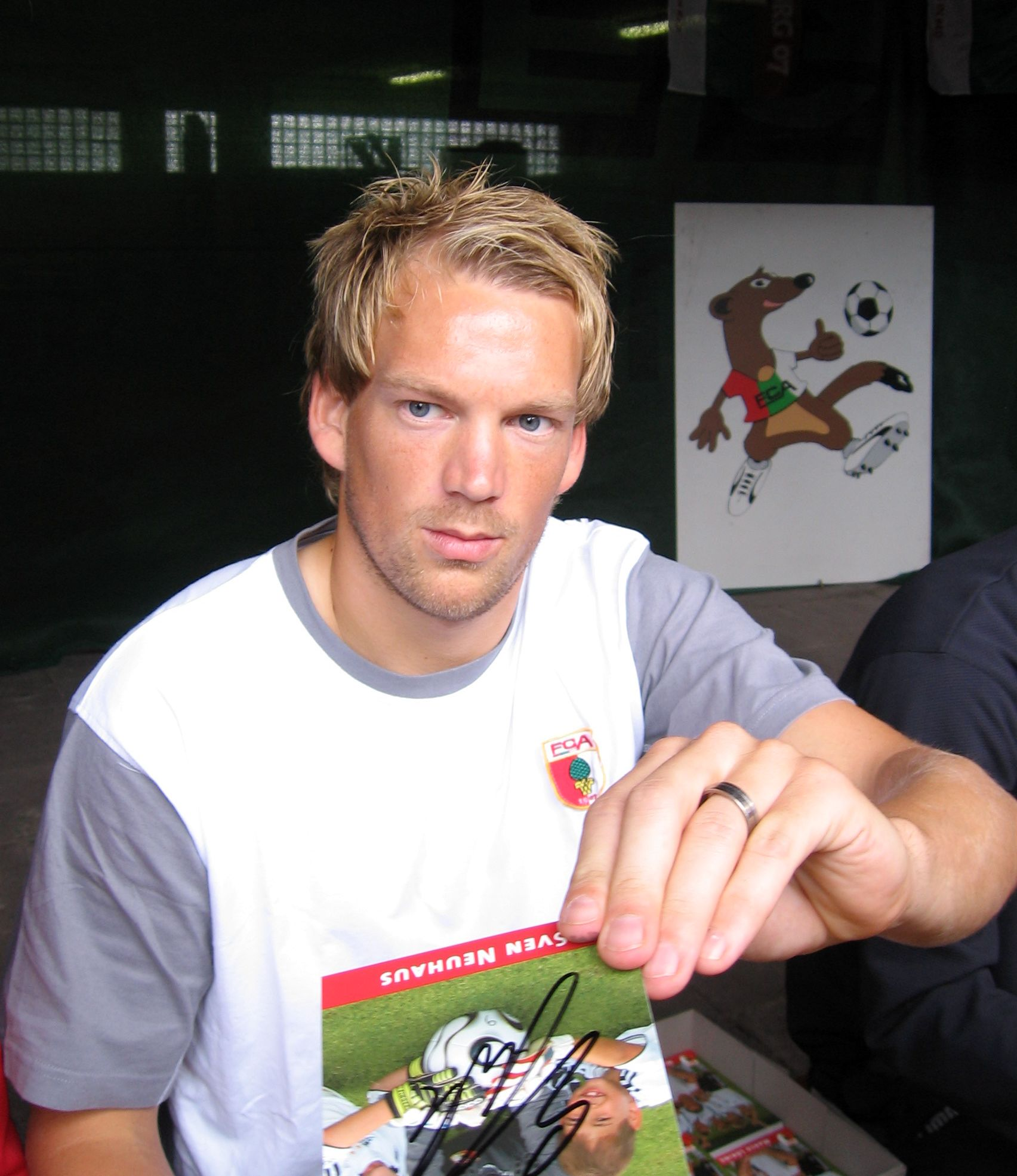
- Neuhaus signing autographs with Augsburg in 2006.

Personal information
- Full name: Sven Neuhaus
- Date of birth: 4 April 1978 (age 48)
- Place of birth: Essen, West Germany
- Height: 1.94 m (6 ft 4 in)
- Position: Goalkeeper

Youth career
- 1983–1990: Borussia Byfang
- 1990–1994: Schwarz-Weiß Essen
- 1994–1996: Fortuna Düsseldorf

Senior career*
Years	Team	Apps	(Gls)
1996–1999	Fortuna Düsseldorf II		
1999–2001	Fortuna Düsseldorf	13	(0)
2001–2006	Greuther Fürth	56	(0)
2006–2009	FC Augsburg	97	(0)
2009–2011	RB Leipzig	50	(0)
2011–2014	Hamburger SV	3	(0)
2011–2014	Hamburger SV II	10	(0)
Total		229	(0)
- * Club domestic league appearances and goals

Sven Neuhaus (born 4 April 1978 in Essen) is a retired German football goalkeeper. He lastly played for Hamburger SV.

In summer 2014, at the age of 36, Neuhaus ended his career.

== Career statistics ==
Appearances and goals by club, season and competition
Club	Season	League			Cup		Other		Total	
Club	Season	Division	Apps	Goals	Apps	Goals	Apps	Goals	Apps	Goa
Fortuna Düsseldorf	1999–2000	Regionalliga West-Südwest	4	0	0	0	—		4	0
Fortuna Düsseldorf	2000–01	Regionalliga Nord	9	0	—		—		9	0
Fortuna Düsseldorf	Total		13	0	0	0	—		13	0
Greuther Fürth	2001–02	2. Bundesliga	2	0	1	0	—		3	0
Greuther Fürth	2002–03	2. Bundesliga	15	0	3	0	—		18	0
Greuther Fürth	2003–04	2. Bundesliga	25	0	2	0	—		27	0
Greuther Fürth	2004–05	2. Bundesliga	9	0	1	0	—		10	0
Greuther Fürth	2005–06	2. Bundesliga	5	0	0	0	—		5	0
Greuther Fürth	Total		56	0	7	0	—		63	0
FC Augsburg	2006–07	2. Bundesliga	30	0	1	0	—		31	0
FC Augsburg	2007–08	2. Bundesliga	34	0	1	0	—		35	0
FC Augsburg	2008–09	2. Bundesliga	33	0	1	0	—		34	0
FC Augsburg	Total		97	0	3	0	—		100	0
RB Leipzig	2009–10	NOFV-Oberliga Süd	24	0	—		—		24	0
RB Leipzig	2010–11	Regionalliga Nord	26	0	—		—		26	0
RB Leipzig	Total		50	0	—		—		59	0
Hamburger SV	2011–12	Bundesliga	3	0	0	0	—		3	0
Hamburger SV	2012–13	Bundesliga	0	0	0	0	—		0	0
Hamburger SV	2013–14	Bundesliga	0	0	0	0	0	0	0	0
Hamburger SV	Total		3	0	0	0	0	0	3	0
Hamburger SV II	2011–12	Regionalliga Nord	3	0	—		—		3	0
Hamburger SV II	2012–13	Regionalliga Nord	7	0	—		—		7	0
Hamburger SV II	Total		10	0	—		—		10	0
Career total			229	0	10	0	0	0	239	0
