= Bavarian football derbies =

Football competitions in Germany

Bavaria football derbies
- Nation
- Germany
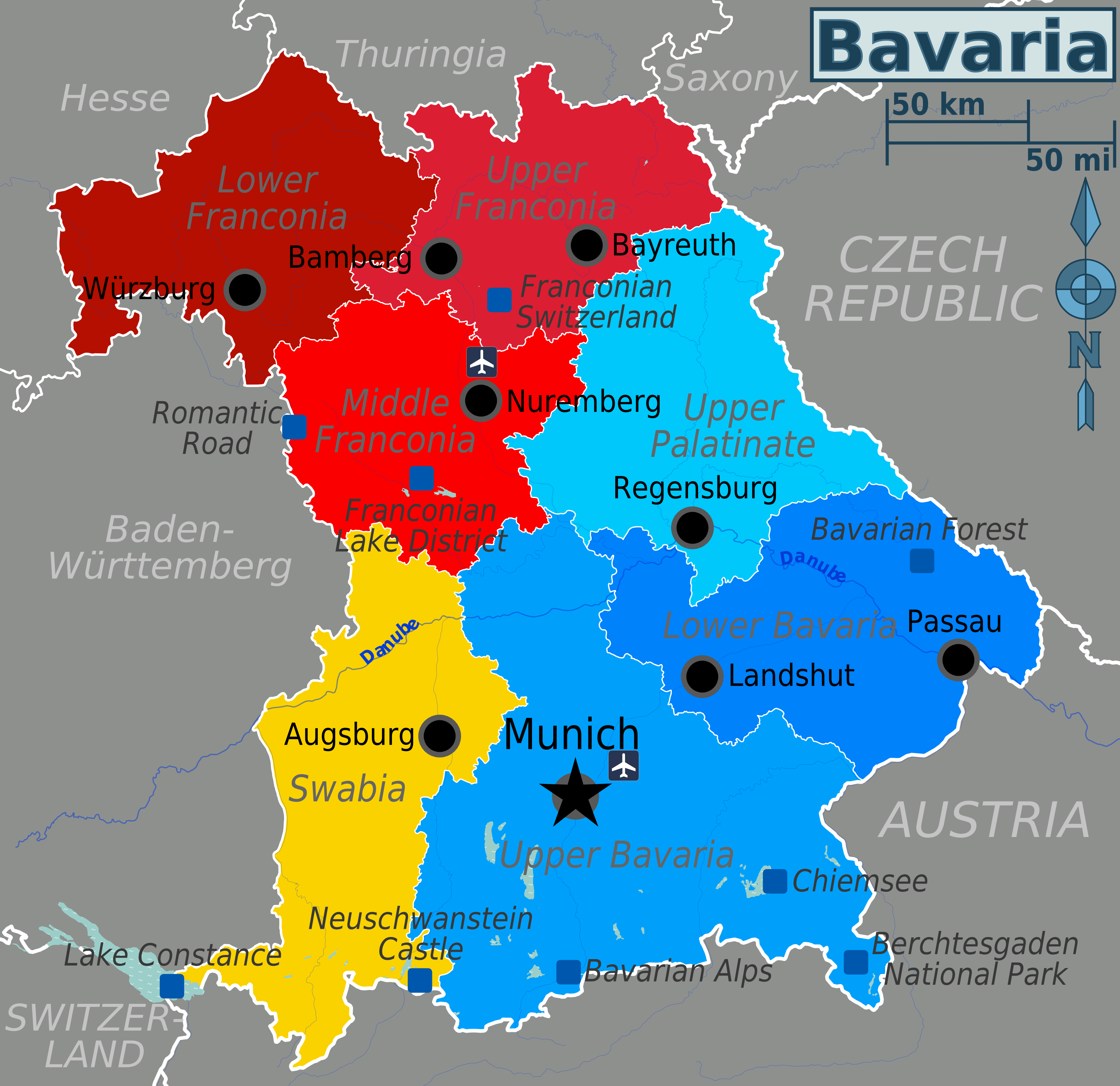
- Bavaria with its cities and subdivisions
- State
- Bavaria
- Leagues
- Bundesliga (1963–)
- Oberliga Süd (1945–63)
- 2. Oberliga Süd (1950–63)
- Regionalliga Süd (1963–74)
- 2. Bundesliga Süd (1974–81)
- 2. Bundesliga (1981–)
- 3. Liga (2008–)
- Regionalliga Süd (1994–2012)
- Regionalliga Bayern (2012–)

The most famous league derbies in Bavarian football are the games between FC Bayern Munich and 1. FC Nürnberg, with the Bayern versus TSV 1860 Munich matchups coming a close second. Traditionally, 1. FC Nürnberg versus SpVgg Fürth is also of historical significance as, especially during the 1920s, those two clubs were dominant forces in German football. A distant fourth comes the Augsburg derby, at times played on highest level in the past, too.

In comparison, all other league derbies in Bavaria took mostly place on state level. Occasionally however, clubs from the same city would still meet in the 2. Bundesliga, like the Würzburg or Ingolstadt derby, which each was played for a season there. With the re-establishment of the Regionalligas in 1994, Bavarian league derbies above the Oberliga level became more common, now also involving reserve sides like FC Bayern Munich II and TSV 1860 Munich II. The latter has grown in importance and attraction in recent years, with spectator figures in excess of 10,000 and live broadcasts in television.

This list includes every derby played in Bavaria on league level above the Bayernliga, which was the highest state league from 1945, when the Oberliga Süd was established, until 2012, when the Regionalliga Bayern was established.

== Leagues ==
Bavarian derbies listed here were and are played in the following leagues:

- Bundesliga (I) from 1963
- Oberliga Süd (I) 1945 to 1963
- 2. Oberliga Süd (II) 1950 to 1963
- Regionalliga Süd (II) 1963 to 1974
- 2. Bundesliga Süd (II) 1974 to 1981
- 2. Bundesliga (II) from 1981
- 3. Liga (III) from 2008
- Regionalliga Süd (III-IV) 1994 to 2012
- Regionalliga Bayern (IV) from 2012

Below these leagues, as the highest level of play in the state of Bavaria until 2012, sat the Bayernliga. This league was formed in 1945 and went through a number of name changes during its existence. Since 2012 the Regionalliga Bayern is the highest football league in the state.

== Regional ==
=== The Bavarian derby ===
Bayern Munich vs. Nürnberg is considered the biggest game in Bavaria, between the two most successful and popular clubs in the state (29 German titles for Bayern and 9 for Nürnberg). It is commonly called the Bavarian derby (German: Bayerische Derby). In German media it is mostly called the Fränkisch-Bayerisches Derby (translated as the Franconian-Old Bavarian derby), as Nuremberg fans consider themselves and their club as non-Bavarian.

The games between the two clubs since the end of the Second World War:

Season	League	Teams	Home	Away
1945-46	Oberliga Süd (I)	FC Bayern Munich - 1. FC Nürnberg	0-0	1-2
1946-47	Oberliga Süd	FC Bayern Munich - 1. FC Nürnberg	0-0	0-5
1947-48	Oberliga Süd	FC Bayern Munich - 1. FC Nürnberg	0-1	1-2
1948-49	Oberliga Süd	FC Bayern Munich - 1. FC Nürnberg	2-1	2-2
1949-50	Oberliga Süd	FC Bayern Munich - 1. FC Nürnberg	2-4	2-4
1950-51	Oberliga Süd	FC Bayern Munich - 1. FC Nürnberg	1-2	1-3
1951-52	Oberliga Süd	FC Bayern Munich - 1. FC Nürnberg	2-2	0-1
1952-53	Oberliga Süd	FC Bayern Munich - 1. FC Nürnberg	0-0	4-1
1953-54	Oberliga Süd	FC Bayern Munich - 1. FC Nürnberg	1-1	0-5
1954-55	Oberliga Süd	FC Bayern Munich - 1. FC Nürnberg	0-2	1-6
1956-57	Oberliga Süd	FC Bayern Munich - 1. FC Nürnberg	1-0	1-3
1957-58	Oberliga Süd	FC Bayern Munich - 1. FC Nürnberg	1-1	0-3
1958-59	Oberliga Süd	FC Bayern Munich - 1. FC Nürnberg	2-5	2-1
1959-60	Oberliga Süd	FC Bayern Munich - 1. FC Nürnberg	3-2	2-2
1960-61	Oberliga Süd	FC Bayern Munich - 1. FC Nürnberg	0-3	1-0
1961-62	Oberliga Süd	FC Bayern Munich - 1. FC Nürnberg	1-1	2-1
1962-63	Oberliga Süd	FC Bayern Munich - 1. FC Nürnberg	2-0	2-3
1965-66	Bundesliga (I)	FC Bayern Munich - 1. FC Nürnberg	0-0	2-2
1965-66	DFB-Pokal	1. FC Nürnberg - FC Bayern Munich	1-2 aet	
1966-67	Bundesliga	FC Bayern Munich - 1. FC Nürnberg	0-1	1-0
1967-68	Bundesliga	FC Bayern Munich - 1. FC Nürnberg	0-2	3-7
1967-68	DFB-Pokal	FC Bayern Munich - 1. FC Nürnberg	2-1	
1968-69	Bundesliga	FC Bayern Munich - 1. FC Nürnberg	3-0	0-2
1968-69	DFB-Pokal	FC Bayern Munich - 1. FC Nürnberg	2-0	
1969-70	DFB-Pokal	1. FC Nürnberg - FC Bayern Munich	2-1	
1978-79	Bundesliga	FC Bayern Munich - 1. FC Nürnberg	4-0	2-4
1980-81	Bundesliga	FC Bayern Munich - 1. FC Nürnberg	4-2	1-0
1981-82	Bundesliga	FC Bayern Munich - 1. FC Nürnberg	1-1	3-0
1981-82	DFB-Pokal	FC Bayern Munich - 1. FC Nürnberg	4-2	
1982-83	Bundesliga	FC Bayern Munich - 1. FC Nürnberg	1-0	3-2
1983-84	Bundesliga	FC Bayern Munich - 1. FC Nürnberg	4-2	4-2
1985-86	Bundesliga	FC Bayern Munich - 1. FC Nürnberg	2-1	1-0
1986-87	Bundesliga	FC Bayern Munich - 1. FC Nürnberg	4-0	2-1
1987-88	Bundesliga	FC Bayern Munich - 1. FC Nürnberg	1-0	3-0
1987-88	DFB-Pokal	FC Bayern Munich - 1. FC Nürnberg	3-1	
1988-89	Bundesliga	FC Bayern Munich - 1. FC Nürnberg	1-0	1-2
1989-90	Bundesliga	FC Bayern Munich - 1. FC Nürnberg	3-2	0-4
1990-91	Bundesliga	FC Bayern Munich - 1. FC Nürnberg	1-0	1-0
1991-92	Bundesliga	FC Bayern Munich - 1. FC Nürnberg	1-3	1-1
1992-93	Bundesliga	FC Bayern Munich - 1. FC Nürnberg	1-0	0-0
1993-94	Bundesliga	FC Bayern Munich - 1. FC Nürnberg	5-0	0-2
1998-99	Bundesliga	FC Bayern Munich - 1. FC Nürnberg	2-0	0-2
2001-02	Bundesliga	FC Bayern Munich - 1. FC Nürnberg	0-0	2-1
2002-03	Bundesliga	FC Bayern Munich - 1. FC Nürnberg	2-0	2-1
2003-04	DFB-Pokal	1. FC Nürnberg - FC Bayern Munich	1-1 / 7-6 after pen.	
2004-05	Bundesliga	FC Bayern Munich - 1. FC Nürnberg	6-3	2-2
2005-06	Bundesliga	FC Bayern Munich - 1. FC Nürnberg	2-1	2-1
2006-07	Bundesliga	FC Bayern Munich - 1. FC Nürnberg	0-0	0-3
2007-08	Bundesliga	FC Bayern Munich - 1. FC Nürnberg	3-0	1-1
2008-09	DFB-Pokal	FC Bayern Munich - 1. FC Nürnberg	2-0	
2009-10	Bundesliga	FC Bayern Munich - 1. FC Nürnberg	2-1	1-1
2010-11	Bundesliga	FC Bayern Munich - 1. FC Nürnberg	3-0	1-1
2011-12	Bundesliga	FC Bayern Munich - 1. FC Nürnberg	4-0	1-0
2012-13	Bundesliga	FC Bayern Munich - 1. FC Nürnberg	4-0	1-1
2013-14	Bundesliga	FC Bayern Munich - 1. FC Nürnberg	2-0	2-0
2018-19	Bundesliga	FC Bayern Munich - 1. FC Nürnberg	3-0	1-1
2019-20	friendly match	1. FC Nürnberg - FC Bayern Munich	5-2	

Overall match statistics

Statistics Bayern-FCN in Official match and friendly match
Competition	Bayern wins	Draws	FCN wins	Total
Bundesliga	38	13	11	62
Oberliga Süd	8	9	17	34
DFB-Pokal	6	1	1	8
Official	52	23	29	104
Other matches	35	13	36	84
Total	87	36	65	188

=== The Franconian derby ===
1. FC Nürnberg vs. Greuther Fürth is not a true city derby by name, because in 1922 Fürth's population opted against their city council's proposal for a merger with Nuremberg. The game is the oldest top-level derby in Bavaria and the most-played football contest in Germany with over 264 games between the two sides. It is commonly called the Franconian derby (German:Frankenderby).

==== 1. FC Nuremberg versus SpVgg Fürth ====
The games between the two clubs since the end of the Second World War:

Season	League	Teams	Home	Away
1945-46	Oberliga Süd (I)	1. FC Nürnberg - SpVgg Fürth	5-3	2-2
1946-47	Oberliga Süd	1. FC Nürnberg - SpVgg Fürth	5-1	3-1
1947-48	Oberliga Süd	1. FC Nürnberg - SpVgg Fürth	0-2	2-1
1949-50	Oberliga Süd	1. FC Nürnberg - SpVgg Fürth	1-2	1-2
1950-51	Oberliga Süd	1. FC Nürnberg - SpVgg Fürth	2-2	0-1
1951-52	Oberliga Süd	1. FC Nürnberg - SpVgg Fürth	2-0	3-3
1952-53	Oberliga Süd	1. FC Nürnberg - SpVgg Fürth	2-2	1-4
1953-54	Oberliga Süd	1. FC Nürnberg - SpVgg Fürth	1-1	2-0
1954-55	Oberliga Süd	1. FC Nürnberg - SpVgg Fürth	0-0	1-2
1955-56	Oberliga Süd	1. FC Nürnberg - SpVgg Fürth	2-1	3-0
1956-57	Oberliga Süd	1. FC Nürnberg - SpVgg Fürth	2-7	2-2
1957-58	Oberliga Süd	1. FC Nürnberg - SpVgg Fürth	2-1	2-2
1958-59	Oberliga Süd	1. FC Nürnberg - SpVgg Fürth	2-1	0-1
1959-60	Oberliga Süd	1. FC Nürnberg - SpVgg Fürth	0-2	4-2
1960-61	Oberliga Süd	1. FC Nürnberg - SpVgg Fürth	4-1	3-1
1961-62	Oberliga Süd	1. FC Nürnberg - SpVgg Fürth	2-0	0-0
1962-63	Oberliga Süd	1. FC Nürnberg - SpVgg Fürth	5-1	5-3
1969-70	Regionalliga Süd (II)	1. FC Nürnberg - SpVgg Fürth	1-0	4-0
1970-71	Regionalliga Süd	1. FC Nürnberg - SpVgg Fürth	1-0	0-0
1971-72	Regionalliga Süd	1. FC Nürnberg - SpVgg Fürth	1-0	1-2
1972-73	Regionalliga Süd	1. FC Nürnberg - SpVgg Fürth	0-1	0-2
1973-74	Regionalliga Süd	1. FC Nürnberg - SpVgg Fürth	2-1	1-0
1974-75	2. Bundesliga Süd (II)	1. FC Nürnberg - SpVgg Fürth	2-0	2-3
1975-76	2. Bundesliga Süd	1. FC Nürnberg - SpVgg Fürth	3-2	3-2
1976-77	2. Bundesliga Süd	1. FC Nürnberg - SpVgg Fürth	1-1	2-0
1977-78	2. Bundesliga Süd	1. FC Nürnberg - SpVgg Fürth	2-1	2-0
1979-80	2. Bundesliga Süd	1. FC Nürnberg - SpVgg Fürth	0-0	4-1
1980-81	DFB-Pokal	SpVgg Fürth - 1. FC Nürnberg	1-1 aet	0-3

==== 1. FC Nürnberg versus SpVgg Greuther Fürth ====
After the merger of SpVgg Fürth and TSV Vestenbergsgreuth, the new club adopted a somewhat combined name but the game against 1. FC Nürnberg is still considered a continuation of the old derby.

Season	League	Teams	Home	Away
1996-97	Regionalliga Süd (III)	1. FC Nürnberg - SpVgg Greuther Fürth	1-0	1-3
1996-97	DFB-Pokal	SpVgg Greuther Fürth - 1. FC Nürnberg	2-1	
1997-98	2. Bundesliga (II)	1. FC Nürnberg - SpVgg Greuther Fürth	0-1	1-0
1999–2000	2. Bundesliga	1. FC Nürnberg - SpVgg Greuther Fürth	2-2	1-1
2000-01	2. Bundesliga	1. FC Nürnberg - SpVgg Greuther Fürth	0-1	1-1
2003-04	2. Bundesliga	1. FC Nürnberg - SpVgg Greuther Fürth	1-1	2-2
2008-09	2. Bundesliga	1. FC Nürnberg - SpVgg Greuther Fürth	2-1	1-1
2011-12	DFB-Pokal	1. FC Nürnberg - SpVgg Greuther Fürth	0-1	
2012-13	Bundesliga (I)	1. FC Nürnberg - SpVgg Greuther Fürth	0-1	0-0
2014-15	2. Bundesliga (II)	1. FC Nürnberg - SpVgg Greuther Fürth	0-0	1-5
2015-16	2. Bundesliga	1. FC Nürnberg - SpVgg Greuther Fürth	2-1	2-3
2016-17	2. Bundesliga	1. FC Nürnberg - SpVgg Greuther Fürth	1-2	0-1
2017-18	2. Bundesliga	1. FC Nürnberg - SpVgg Greuther Fürth	0-2	3-1
2019-20	2. Bundesliga	1. FC Nürnberg - SpVgg Greuther Fürth	0-1	0-0
2020-21	2. Bundesliga	1. FC Nürnberg - SpVgg Greuther Fürth	2-3	2-2

==== Overall match statistics ====
Statistics FCN-Fürth in Official match and friendly match
Competition	FCN wins	Draws	Fürth wins	Total
Bundesliga	0	1	1	2
Oberliga Süd	16	8	10	34
2. Bundesliga	4	8	7	18
2. Bundesliga Süd	7	2	1	10
Regionalliga Süd	7	1	4	12
DFB-Pokal	4	1	3	8
Other matches	101	27	50	87
Total	139	48	76	265

==== 1. FC Nürnberg II versus SpVgg Greuther Fürth II ====
With both reserve sides achieving Bayernliga qualification in 2001 for the first time, the "little" Franconian derby will be played at this level for the first time in the 2001–02 season:

Season	Competition	Date	Home team	Result	Away team
2001–02 (IV)	Bayernliga	28 October 2001	SpVgg Greuther Fürth II	3–1	1. FC Nürnberg II
2001–02 (IV)	Bayernliga	25 May 2002	1. FC Nürnberg II	2–1	SpVgg Greuther Fürth II
2002–03	Bayernliga	22 September 2002	1. FC Nürnberg II	5–2	SpVgg Greuther Fürth II
2002–03	Bayernliga	17 April 2003	SpVgg Greuther Fürth II	2–3	1. FC Nürnberg II
2003–04	Bayernliga	25 July 2003	SpVgg Greuther Fürth II	1–2	1. FC Nürnberg II
2003–04	Bayernliga	8 November 2003	1. FC Nürnberg II	4–2	SpVgg Greuther Fürth II
2004–05	Bayernliga	16 October 2004	SpVgg Greuther Fürth II	0–1	1. FC Nürnberg II
2004–05	Bayernliga	4 May 2005	1. FC Nürnberg II	2–0	SpVgg Greuther Fürth II
2005–06	Bayernliga	18 September 2005	SpVgg Greuther Fürth II	0–0	1. FC Nürnberg II
2005–06	Bayernliga	8 April 2006	1. FC Nürnberg II	0–0	SpVgg Greuther Fürth II
2006–07	Bayernliga	30 July 2006	1. FC Nürnberg II	1–4	SpVgg Greuther Fürth II
2006–07	Bayernliga	17 November 2006	SpVgg Greuther Fürth II	1–0	1. FC Nürnberg II
2007–08	Bayernliga	21 October 2007	1. FC Nürnberg II	1–2	SpVgg Greuther Fürth II
2007–08	Bayernliga	10 May 2008	SpVgg Greuther Fürth II	2–2	1. FC Nürnberg II
2008–09	Regionalliga Süd (IV)	15 November 2008	1. FC Nürnberg II	1–1	SpVgg Greuther Fürth II
2008–09	Regionalliga Süd (IV)	13 May 2009	SpVgg Greuther Fürth II	0–1	1. FC Nürnberg II
2009–10	Regionalliga Süd	12 September 2009	SpVgg Greuther Fürth II	1–4	1. FC Nürnberg II
2009–10	Regionalliga Süd	28 March 2010	1. FC Nürnberg II	2–0	SpVgg Greuther Fürth II
2010–11	Regionalliga Süd	6 November 2010	SpVgg Greuther Fürth II	6–1	1. FC Nürnberg II
2010–11	Regionalliga Süd	14 May 2011	1. FC Nürnberg II	4–4	SpVgg Greuther Fürth II
2011–12	Regionalliga Süd	24 September 2011	1. FC Nürnberg II	1–2	SpVgg Greuther Fürth II
2011–12	Regionalliga Süd	31 March 2012	SpVgg Greuther Fürth II	1–1	1. FC Nürnberg II
2012–13	Regionalliga Bayern (IV)	26 September 2012	SpVgg Greuther Fürth II	1–2	1. FC Nürnberg II
2012–13	Regionalliga Bayern (IV)	31 March 2013	1. FC Nürnberg II	0–2	SpVgg Greuther Fürth II
2013–14	Regionalliga Bayern	6 October 2013	SpVgg Greuther Fürth II	1–3	1. FC Nürnberg II
2013–14	Regionalliga Bayern	10 May 2014	1. FC Nürnberg II	2–2	SpVgg Greuther Fürth II
2014–15	Regionalliga Bayern	11 October 2014	1. FC Nürnberg II	0–3	SpVgg Greuther Fürth II
2014–15	Regionalliga Bayern	10 May 2015	SpVgg Greuther Fürth II	0–3	1. FC Nürnberg II
2015–16	Regionalliga Bayern	4 October 2015	SpVgg Greuther Fürth II	0–5	1. FC Nürnberg II
2015–16	Regionalliga Bayern	25 April 2015	1. FC Nürnberg II	3–1	SpVgg Greuther Fürth II
2016–17	Regionalliga Bayern	23 October 2016	SpVgg Greuther Fürth II	0–1	1. FC Nürnberg II
2016–17	Regionalliga Bayern	11 May 2017	1. FC Nürnberg II	2–1	SpVgg Greuther Fürth II
2017–18	Regionalliga Bayern	16 October 2017	SpVgg Greuther Fürth II	0–2	1. FC Nürnberg II
2017–18	Regionalliga Bayern	21 April 2018	1. FC Nürnberg II	0–2	SpVgg Greuther Fürth II
2018–19	Regionalliga Bayern	29 September 2018	SpVgg Greuther Fürth II	1–1	1. FC Nürnberg II
2018–19	Regionalliga Bayern	20 April 2019	1. FC Nürnberg II	2–3	SpVgg Greuther Fürth II
2019–2021	Regionalliga Bayern	15 September 2019	1. FC Nürnberg II	5–1	SpVgg Greuther Fürth II
2021–22	Regionalliga Bayern	28 August 2021	SpVgg Greuther Fürth II	1–1	1. FC Nürnberg II

=== Augsburg-1860 Munich rivalry ===
FC Augsburg and TSV 1860 München share a fierce rivalry.

=== Augsburg-Ingolstadt derby ===
FC Augsburg and FC Ingolstadt are considered fierce local rivals

Season	Competition	Date	Home team	Result	Away team
2008–09	2. Bundesliga	24 October 2008	FC Ingolstadt	1–2	FC Augsburg
2008–09	2. Bundesliga	3 April 2009	FC Augsburg	1–1	FC Ingolstadt
2009–10	DFB-Pokal	31 July 2009	FC Ingolstadt	1–2	FC Augsburg
2010–11	2. Bundesliga	21 August 2010	FC Ingolstadt	1–4	FC Augsburg
2010–11	2. Bundesliga	16 January 2011	FC Augsburg	2–0	FC Ingolstadt
2015–16	Bundesliga	29 August 2015	FC Augsburg	0–1	FC Ingolstadt
2015–16	Bundesliga	6 February 2016	FC Ingolstadt	2–1	FC Augsburg
2016–17	Bundesliga	5 November 2016	FC Ingolstadt	0–2	FC Augsburg
2016–17	Bundesliga	5 April 2017	FC Augsburg	2–3	FC Ingolstadt

=== Danube river derby ===
The Donau derby, named after the Danube river, is played between FC Ingolstadt 04 and Jahn Regensburg.

League

#	Season	Date	Competition	Home Team	Result	Away Team	Stadium	Attendance	H2H
1	2007–08	18 August 2007	Regionalliga Süd	Ingolstadt	0–1	Jahn Regensburg	BSA Mitte	4,850	+1
2	2007–08	8 March 2008	Regionalliga Süd	Jahn Regensburg	1–3	Ingolstadt	Jahnstadion	4,000	0
3	2009–10	18 August 2007	3. Liga	Jahn Regensburg	0–2	Ingolstadt	Jahnstadion	7,528	+1
4	2009–10	27 March 2008	3. Liga	Ingolstadt	2–2	Jahn Regensburg	BSA Mitte	3,304	+1
5	2012–13	11 November 2012	2. Bundesliga	Ingolstdat	4–2	Jahn Regensburg	Audi Sportpark	9,473	0
6	2012–13	19 April 2013	2. Bundesliga	Jahn Regensburg	1–2	Ingolstadt	Jahnstadion	5,322	+1
7	2017–18	20 August 2017	2. Bundesliga	Ingolstdat	2–4	Jahn Regensburg	Audi Sportpark	9,473	0
8	2017–18	26 January 2018	2. Bundesliga	Jahn Regensburg	3–2	Ingolstadt	Jahnstadion	13,110	+1
9	2018–19	4 August 2018	2. Bundesliga	Jahn Regensburg	2–1	Ingolstdat	Jahnstadion	13,516	+2
10	2018–19	22 December 2018	2. Bundesliga	Ingolstadt	1–2	Jahn Regensburg	Audi Sportpark	10,038	+3
11	2021–22	31 October 2021	2. Bundesliga	Ingolstadt	0–3	Jahn Regensburg	Audi Sportpark	7,024	+4
12	2021–22	8 April 2022	2. Bundesliga	Jahn Regensburg	1–1	Ingolstadt	Jahnstadion	12,089	+4
13	2023–24	8 October 2023	3. Liga	Ingolstadt	2–4	Jahn Regensburg	Audi Sportpark	6,294	+5
14	2023–24	9 March 2024	3. Liga	Jahn Regensburg	1–1	Ingolstadt	Jahnstadion	12,592	+5

Cup

#	Season	Date	Competition	Home Team	Result	Away Team	Stadium	Attendance	Round
1	2023–24	7 September 2023	Bayerischer Pokal	Ingolstadt	0–0 (Note: Ingolstadt won 9–8 on penalties.)	Jahn Regensburg	Audi Sportpark	2,969	Round of 16

== Local ==
=== The Munich derby ===
This is the biggest game in Munich, between the Bavarian capital's two most dominant and successful clubs. It is commonly called the Munich derby (German: Münchner Stadtderby).

==== FC Bayern Munich versus TSV 1860 Munich ====
The games between the two clubs since the end of the Second World War:

Season	League	Teams	Home	Away
1945-46	Oberliga Süd (I)	FC Bayern Munich - TSV 1860 Munich	1-0	2-2
1946-47	Oberliga Süd	FC Bayern Munich - TSV 1860 Munich	1-1	2-0
1947-48	Oberliga Süd	FC Bayern Munich - TSV 1860 Munich	3-2	1-1
1948-49	Oberliga Süd	FC Bayern Munich - TSV 1860 Munich	1-0	2-0
1949-50	Oberliga Süd	FC Bayern Munich - TSV 1860 Munich	1-0	2-3
1950-51	Oberliga Süd	FC Bayern Munich - TSV 1860 Munich	2-3	1-3
1951-52	Oberliga Süd	FC Bayern Munich - TSV 1860 Munich	2-0	2-2
1952-53	Oberliga Süd	FC Bayern Munich - TSV 1860 Munich	2-1	2-2
1957-58	Oberliga Süd	FC Bayern Munich - TSV 1860 Munich	3-3	3-4
1958-59	Oberliga Süd	FC Bayern Munich - TSV 1860 Munich	1-2	2-1
1959-60	Oberliga Süd	FC Bayern Munich - TSV 1860 Munich	1-3	6-4
1960-61	Oberliga Süd	FC Bayern Munich - TSV 1860 Munich	6-2	0-0
1961-62	Oberliga Süd	FC Bayern Munich - TSV 1860 Munich	0-4	3-2
1962-63	Oberliga Süd	FC Bayern Munich - TSV 1860 Munich	3-1	1-3
1965-66	Bundesliga (I)	FC Bayern Munich - TSV 1860 Munich	3-0	0-1
1966-67	Bundesliga	FC Bayern Munich - TSV 1860 Munich	3-0	0-1
1966-67	DFB-Pokal	FC Bayern Munich - TSV 1860 Munich	3-1	
1967-68	Bundesliga	FC Bayern Munich - TSV 1860 Munich	2-2	2-3
1968-69	Bundesliga	FC Bayern Munich - TSV 1860 Munich	0-2	3-0
1969-70	Bundesliga	FC Bayern Munich - TSV 1860 Munich	2-0	1-2
1977-78	Bundesliga	FC Bayern Munich - TSV 1860 Munich	1-3	1-1
1979-80	Bundesliga	FC Bayern Munich - TSV 1860 Munich	6-1	2-1
1980-81	Bundesliga	FC Bayern Munich - TSV 1860 Munich	1-1	3-1
1994-95	Bundesliga	FC Bayern Munich - TSV 1860 Munich	1-0	3-1
1995-96	Bundesliga	FC Bayern Munich - TSV 1860 Munich	4-2	2-0
1996-97	Bundesliga	FC Bayern Munich - TSV 1860 Munich	1-1	3-3
1997-98	Bundesliga	FC Bayern Munich - TSV 1860 Munich	3-1	2-2
1998-99	Bundesliga	FC Bayern Munich - TSV 1860 Munich	3-1	1-1
1999–2000	Bundesliga	FC Bayern Munich - TSV 1860 Munich	1-2	0-1
2000-01	Bundesliga	FC Bayern Munich - TSV 1860 Munich	3-1	2-0
2001-02	Bundesliga	FC Bayern Munich - TSV 1860 Munich	2-1	5-1
2002-03	Bundesliga	FC Bayern Munich - TSV 1860 Munich	3-1	5-0
2003-04	Bundesliga	FC Bayern Munich - TSV 1860 Munich	1-0	1-0
2007-08	DFB-Pokal	FC Bayern Munich - TSV 1860 Munich	1-0 aet	

==== FC Bayern Munich II versus TSV 1860 Munich II ====
The games of the reserve sides of the two clubs:

Season	League	Teams	Home	Away
1997-98	Regionalliga Süd (III)	FC Bayern Munich II - TSV 1860 Munich II	2-2	1-3
1998-99	Regionalliga Süd	FC Bayern Munich II - TSV 1860 Munich II	3-1	1-0
1999-00	Regionalliga Süd	FC Bayern Munich II - TSV 1860 Munich II	1-3	3-4
2000-01	Regionalliga Süd	FC Bayern Munich II - TSV 1860 Munich II	0-0	3-0
2004-05	Regionalliga Süd	FC Bayern Munich II - TSV 1860 Munich II	4-2	1-1
2005-06	Regionalliga Süd	FC Bayern Munich II - TSV 1860 Munich II	1-0	2-2
2006-07	Regionalliga Süd	FC Bayern Munich II - TSV 1860 Munich II	1-1	1-1
2007-08	Regionalliga Süd	FC Bayern Munich II - TSV 1860 Munich II	1-0	2-3
2011-12	Regionalliga Süd (IV)	FC Bayern Munich II - TSV 1860 Munich II	1-2	1-0
2012-13	Regionalliga Bayern (IV)	FC Bayern Munich II - TSV 1860 Munich II	0-1	2-0
2013-14	Regionalliga Bayern	FC Bayern Munich II - TSV 1860 Munich II	2-0	1-2
2014-15	Regionalliga Bayern	FC Bayern Munich II - TSV 1860 Munich II	1-0	3-1
2015-16	Regionalliga Bayern	FC Bayern Munich II - TSV 1860 Munich II	0-0	0-2
2016-17	Regionalliga Bayern	FC Bayern Munich II - TSV 1860 Munich II	0-0	0-2

=== The Augsburg derby ===
By far the biggest derby in the city of Augsburg was the BCA versus Schwaben game.

Season	League	Teams	Home	Away
1945-46	Oberliga Süd (I)	TSV Schwaben Augsburg - BC Augsburg	3-0	2-2
1946-47	Oberliga Süd	TSV Schwaben Augsburg - BC Augsburg	1-1	1-0
1948-49	Oberliga Süd	TSV Schwaben Augsburg - BC Augsburg	2-3	4-0
1949-50	Oberliga Süd	TSV Schwaben Augsburg - BC Augsburg	1-1	0-3
1950-51	Oberliga Süd	TSV Schwaben Augsburg - BC Augsburg	1-1	0-5
1954-55	Oberliga Süd	TSV Schwaben Augsburg - BC Augsburg	1-4	1-2
1955-56	Oberliga Süd	TSV Schwaben Augsburg - BC Augsburg	2-1	3-2
1956-57	Oberliga Süd	TSV Schwaben Augsburg - BC Augsburg	5-2	1-3
1960-61	2. Oberliga Süd (II)	TSV Schwaben Augsburg - BC Augsburg	0-3	0-1
1961-62	Oberliga Süd (I)	TSV Schwaben Augsburg - BC Augsburg	2-0	1-0
1962-63	Oberliga Süd	TSV Schwaben Augsburg - BC Augsburg	0-1	2-3
1963-64	Regionalliga Süd (II)	TSV Schwaben Augsburg - BC Augsburg	0-0	1-1
1966-67	Regionalliga Süd	TSV Schwaben Augsburg - BC Augsburg	1-0	2-0

- Schwaben and BCA merged in 1969 to form FC Augsburg but Schwaben soon established itself as an independent club again and the derbies between them and FCA are seen as a continuation of the games versus BCA. These new derbies however have taken place in the Oberliga Bayern only.

=== The Fürth derby ===
This derby has little historic background and was only played on higher level for one season. Usually, the two clubs played in tiers far apart, only from 1988 to 1991 did both clubs previously meet in the Landesliga Bayern-Mitte.

Season	League	Teams	Home	Away
1996-97	Regionalliga Süd (III)	SpVgg Greuther Fürth - SG Quelle Fürth	3-1	4-1

Source:"Quelle Fürth » Die Bilanz gegen SpVgg Greuther Fürth". Weltfussball.de.

=== The Ingolstadt derby ===
This derby was played as high up as the 2. Bundesliga but more common in the Oberliga and Landesliga Bayern-Süd. It came to an end in 2004, when both clubs merged to form FC Ingolstadt 04.

Season	League	Teams	Home	Away
1979-80	2. Bundesliga Süd (II)	MTV Ingolstadt - ESV Ingolstadt	2-1	2-2

Source:"MTV Ingolstadt » Die Bilanz gegen ESV Ingolstadt". Weltfussball.de.

=== The other Munich derbies ===
Munich, being the Bavarian capital, had many clubs at Oberliga level and above and therefore there were many derbies.

==== FC Bayern Munich versus FC Bayern Munich II ====
A very unusual derby was played in the DFB-Pokal in 1976, when Bayern Munich's first team met its reserve side:

Season	League	Teams	Home	Away
1976–77	DFB-Pokal	FC Bayern Munich - FC Bayern Munich II	5–3	

==== FC Bayern Munich versus SpVgg Unterhaching ====
Unterhaching, being a relatively new club in professional football, did not play the FC Bayern until very recently.

Season	League	Teams	Home	Away
1999–2000	Bundesliga (I)	FC Bayern Munich - SpVgg Unterhaching	1-0	2-0
2000-01	Bundesliga	FC Bayern Munich - SpVgg Unterhaching	3-1	0-1

Source:"SpVgg Unterhaching » Die Bilanz gegen Bayern München". Weltfussball.de.

==== FC Bayern Munich versus FC Wacker München ====
This derby has a long tradition but due to the steep decline of the FC Wacker has not been played for a long time.

Season	League	Teams	Home	Away
1947-48	Oberliga Süd (I)	FC Bayern Munich - FC Wacker München	2-2	3-1
1964-65	Regionalliga Süd (II)	FC Bayern Munich - FC Wacker München	1-0	9-2

Source:"Tables and results of the Regionalliga Süd". Das deutsche Fussball Archiv.

==== TSV 1860 Munich versus SpVgg Unterhaching ====
Unterhaching and the TSV 1860 first met in the Oberliga Bayern in 1982 and played most of their derbies in this league, only meeting on professional level for the first time in 1999.

Season	League	Teams	Home	Away
1999–2000	Bundesliga (I)	TSV 1860 Munich - SpVgg Unterhaching	2-1	1-1
2000-01	Bundesliga	TSV 1860 Munich - SpVgg Unterhaching	0-2	2-3
2000-01	DFB-Pokal	SpVgg Unterhaching - TSV 1860 Munich	1-2 aet	
2004-05	2. Bundesliga (II)	TSV 1860 Munich - SpVgg Unterhaching	2-2	1-1
2005-06	2. Bundesliga	TSV 1860 Munich - SpVgg Unterhaching	1-4	1-0
2006-07	2. Bundesliga	TSV 1860 Munich - SpVgg Unterhaching	1-0	1-5
2018-19	3. Liga (III)	TSV 1860 Munich - SpVgg Unterhaching	1-0	1-1
2019-20	3. Liga (III)	TSV 1860 Munich - SpVgg Unterhaching	3-0	3-2

Source:"TSV 1860 München » Die Bilanz gegen SpVgg Unterhachinglstadt". Weltfussball.de.

==== TSV 1860 Munich versus FC Wacker München ====
This derby has a long tradition but due to the steep decline of the FC Wacker has not been played in recent seasons. The two clubs also met frequently in the Oberliga, last in 1989.

Season	League	Teams	Home	Away
1947-48	Oberliga Süd (I)	TSV 1860 Munich - FC Wacker München	3-1	1-1
1953-54	2. Oberliga Süd (II)	TSV 1860 Munich - FC Wacker München	4-0	1-0
1970-71	Regionalliga Süd (II)	TSV 1860 Munich - FC Wacker München	2-1	3-0
1972-73	Regionalliga Süd	TSV 1860 Munich - FC Wacker München	4-1	5-1

Source:"Tables and results of the Regionalliga Süd". Das deutsche Fussball Archiv.

==== FC Bayern Munich II versus SpVgg Unterhaching ====
Season	League	Teams	Home	Away
1994-95	Regionalliga Süd (III)	FC Bayern Munich II - SpVgg Unterhaching	2-2	1-2
2002-03	Regionalliga Süd	FC Bayern Munich II - SpVgg Unterhaching	0-2	1-5
2007-08	Regionalliga Süd	FC Bayern Munich II - SpVgg Unterhaching	2-4	0-0
2008-09	3. Liga (III)	FC Bayern Munich II - SpVgg Unterhaching	0-0	1-2
2009-10	3. Liga	FC Bayern Munich II - SpVgg Unterhaching	1-1	1-0
2010-11	3. Liga	FC Bayern Munich II - SpVgg Unterhaching	1-0	4-0
2015-16	Regionalliga Bayern (IV)	FC Bayern Munich II - SpVgg Unterhaching	1–1	1-4
2019-20	3.Liga (III)	FC Bayern Munich II - SpVgg Unterhaching	1–2	1-0
2020-21	3.Liga (III)	FC Bayern Munich II - SpVgg Unterhaching		

Source:"SpVgg Unterhaching » Die Bilanz gegen Bayern München II". Weltfussball.de.

==== TSV 1860 Munich II versus SpVgg Unterhaching ====
Season	League	Teams	Home	Away
2007-08	Regionalliga Süd (III)	TSV 1860 Munich II - SpVgg Unterhaching	0-1	2-2
2015-16	Regionalliga Bayern (IV)	TSV 1860 Munich II - SpVgg Unterhaching	2-4	1-1

Source:"SpVgg Unterhaching » Die Bilanz gegen TSV 1860 München II". Weltfussball.de.

=== The Würzburg derby ===
The Würzburg derby between FV Würzburg 04 and Würzburger Kickers, first played in 1908, was held as high as the 2. Bundesliga but came temporarily to a halt when the FV folded in 1981. The club reformed and the derby has since been played mostly on Landesliga Bayern-Nord level but also in the Bayernliga in recent years.

Season	Competition	Date	Home team	Result	Away team
1977–78	2. Bundesliga	5 November 1977	Würzburger Kickers	2–2	Würzburger FV
1977–78	2. Bundesliga	22 April 1978	Würzburger FV	4–0	Würzburger Kickers
2008–09	Bayernliga	13 August 2008	Würzburger FV	1–2	Würzburger Kickers
2008–09	Bayernliga	7 March 2009	Würzburger Kickers	5–2	Würzburger FV

== See also ==
- Local derby
