= Sascha Lewandowski =

German football manager (1971–2016)

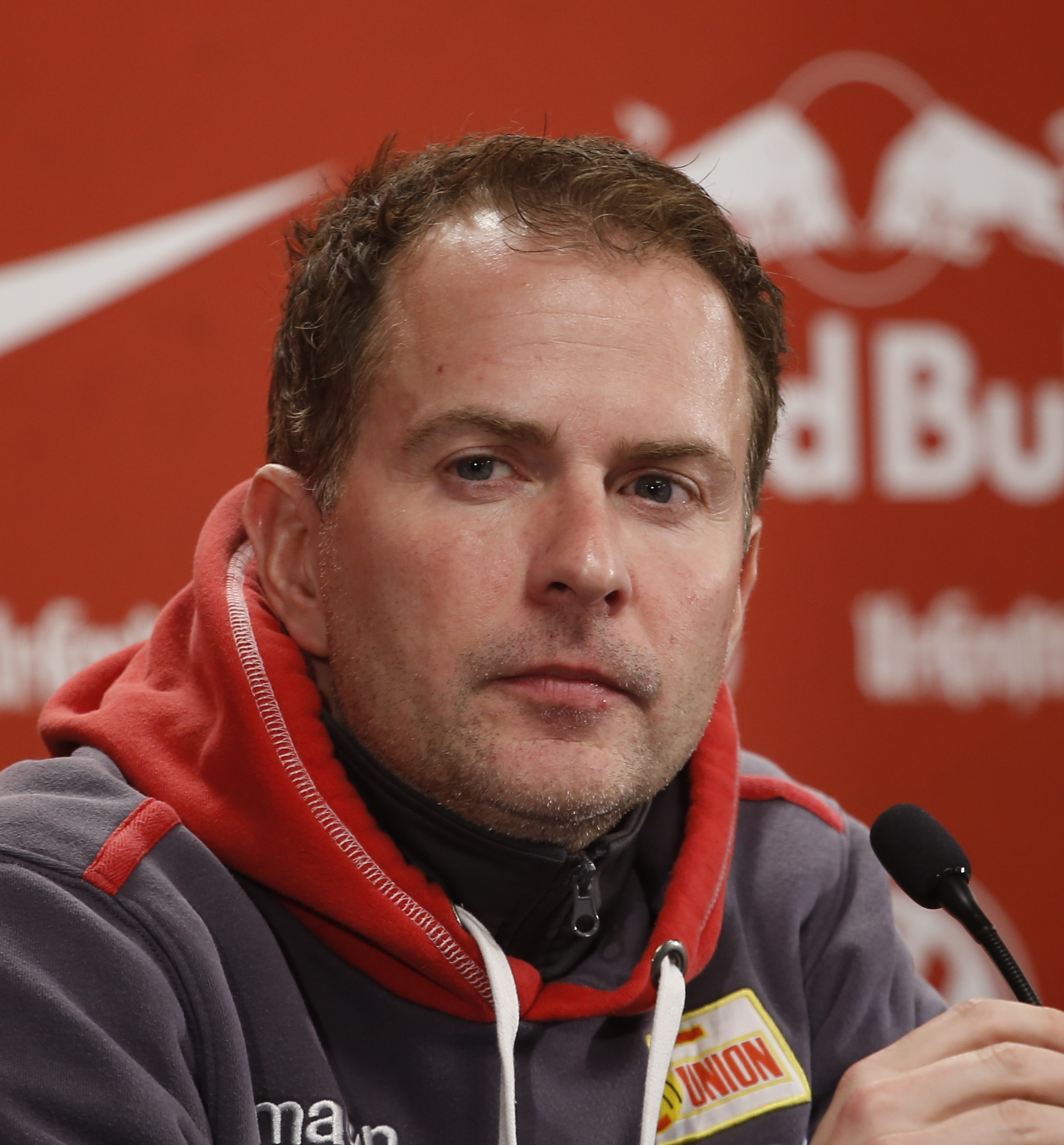
- Lewandowski in 2016

Personal information
- Date of birth: 5 October 1971
- Place of birth: Dortmund, North Rhine-Westphalia, West Germany
- Date of death: 8 June 2016 (aged 44)
- Place of death: Bochum, North Rhine-Westphalia, Germany

Managerial career
- Years: Team
- 2006: VfL Bochum II
- 2007–2012: Bayer Leverkusen U19
- 2012–2013: Bayer Leverkusen
- 2014: Bayer Leverkusen
- 2015–2016: Union Berlin

Sascha Lewandowski (5 October 1971 – 8 June 2016) was a German football manager.

== Managerial career ==
Lewandowski was head coach of VfL Bochum II between 1 July 2006 to 31 December 2006.

Lewandowski was appointed as head coach of Bayer Leverkusen in April 2012 alongside Sami Hyypiä. After the 2012–13 season, Lewandowski went back to the youth set–up, leaving Hyypia as the sole head coach of the first team. He finished with a record of 29 wins, 11 draws, and 11 losses. Hyypiä took sole charge of the team on 24 June 2013. Lewandowski became the interim head coach of the first team after Sami Hyypiä was sacked. On 25 April 2014, Roger Schmidt was announced as head coach for the start of the 2014–15 season. He finished with a record of five wins and a draw.

He was appointed as the head coach of Union Berlin on 1 September 2015. He stepped down on 4 March 2016, after six months in charge, on medical advice because of acute fatigue symptoms. He finished with a record of five wins, four draws, and five losses.

== Personal life ==
Sascha Lewandowski was born on 5 October 1971 in Dortmund, West Germany. On 9 June 2016, he was found dead at his home in Bochum, Germany. The police later found that he had committed suicide the previous day. In the days before this event, he had been held by the Dortmund police for charges of child abuse.

== Managerial statistics ==
Team	From	To	Record					
Team	From	To	G	W	D	L	Win %	Ref.
Bochum II	1 July 2006	31 December 2006	17	8	1	8	47.06	
Bayer Leverkusen	1 April 2012	24 June 2013	51	29	11	11	56.86	
Bayer Leverkusen	5 April 2014	30 June 2014	5	4	1	0	80.00	
Union Berlin	1 September 2015	4 March 2016	14	5	4	5	35.71	
Total			87	46	17	24	52.87	—
