= Tayfun Korkut =

Football player and coach (born 1974)

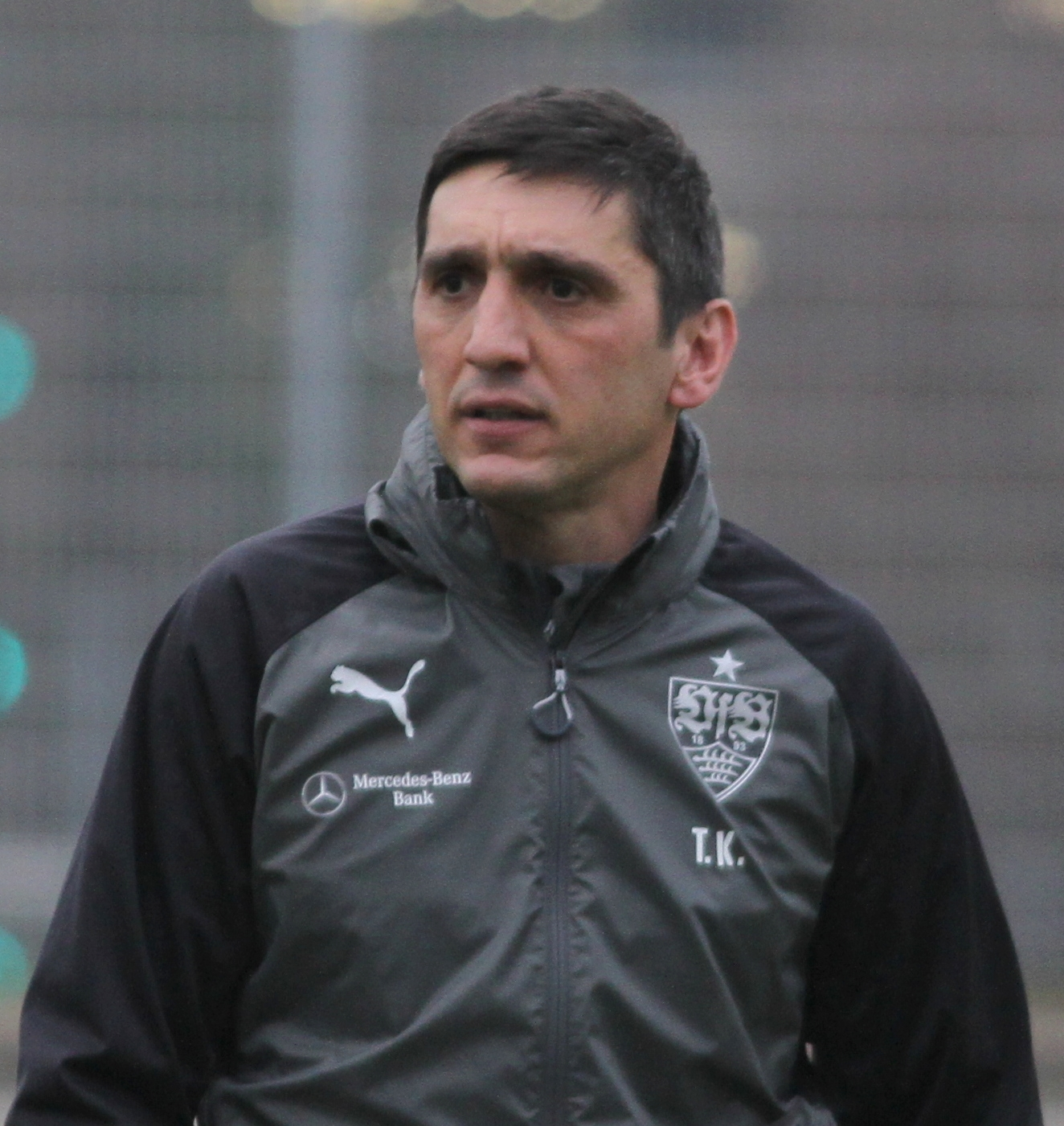
- Korkut in 2018

Personal information
- Date of birth: 2 April 1974 (age 52)
- Place of birth: Stuttgart, West Germany
- Height: 1.84 m (6 ft 0 in)
- Position: Midfielder

Youth career
- 1986–1994: Stuttgarter Kickers

Senior career*
| Years | Team | Apps | (Gls) |
| 1994–1995 | Stuttgarter Kickers | 14 | (0) |
| 1995–2000 | Fenerbahçe | 145 | (12) |
| 2000–2003 | Real Sociedad | 78 | (9) |
| 2003–2004 | Espanyol | 21 | (0) |
| 2004–2005 | Beşiktaş | 16 | (1) |
| 2005–2006 | Gençlerbirliği | 13 | (1) |
| Total | | 287 | (23) |

International career
| 1995 | Turkey U21 | 3 | (1) |
| 1995–2003 | Turkey | 42 | (1) |

Managerial career
- 2007–2008: Real Sociedad U19
- 2009–2010: TSG Hoffenheim U17
- 2011–2012: VfB Stuttgart U19
- 2012–2013: Turkey (assistant)
- 2013–2015: Hannover 96
- 2016: 1. FC Kaiserslautern
- 2017: Bayer Leverkusen (interim)
- 2018: VfB Stuttgart
- 2021–2022: Hertha BSC
- * Club domestic league appearances and goals

Tayfun Korkut (German pronunciation: [ˈtaɪfʊn ˈkɔɐ̯kʊt]; born 2 April 1974) is a football manager and former player. He was most recently the head coach of Hertha BSC. Born in Germany, he represented the Turkey national team internationally.

== International career ==
Korkut earned 42 caps and one goal for the Turkey national team. He represented his country at the UEFA Euro 1996 and UEFA Euro 2000.

== Managerial career ==
=== Early career ===
Korkut worked as a coach for Real Sociedad U19, 1899 Hoffenheim U17 and VfB Stuttgart U19 before serving as an assistant coach for the Turkey national team. He received the UEFA Pro License from the Cologne Sports Academy.

=== Hannover 96 ===
Korkut was appointed head coach of Hannover 96 on 31 December 2013. He became the second Turkish Bundesliga head coach ever, after Özcan Arkoç. His first match was a 3–1 win against VfL Wolfsburg on 25 January 2014. Hannover finished the 2013–14 season in 10th place. Hannover started the 2014–15 season. He was sacked on 20 April 2015. His final match was a 4–0 loss to Bayer Leverkusen. Hannover were in 15th place at the time of the sacking. He finished with a record of 15 wins, 11 draws, and 22 losses.

=== 1. FC Kaiserslautern ===
On 17 June 2016, Korkut was selected as the head coach of 1. FC Kaiserslautern. He resigned on 27 December 2016. He finished with a record of four wins, seven draws, and seven losses.

=== Bayer Leverkusen ===
On 6 March 2017, Korkut was appointed the new coach of Bayer Leverkusen until the end of the season. One week before the end of the season, it was decided that Korkut's contract would not be extended. He finished with a record of two wins, six draws, and four losses.

=== VfB Stuttgart ===
On 29 January 2018, Korkut was appointed coach of VfB Stuttgart. In June 2018, he extended his contract with Stuttgart until June 2020. He was sacked on 7 October 2018.

=== Hertha BSC ===
On 29 November 2021, Korkut was named head coach of Hertha BSC. He was sacked on 13 March 2022, after only 13 league games in charge, where Hertha gained a meagre nine points, dropping into the relegation zone.

== Personal life ==
Korkut is fluent in Turkish, German, Spanish and English. His wife Elena is Spanish, having met her during his stint with Real Sociedad in Spain, and has three children with her. His eldest son Efe Korkut is also a professional footballer.

== Career statistics ==
Appearances and goals by national team and year
| National team | Year | Apps | Goals |
|---|---|---|---|
| Turkey | 1995 | 1 | 0 |
| Turkey | 1996 | 6 | 0 |
| Turkey | 1997 | 6 | 0 |
| Turkey | 1998 | 4 | 0 |
| Turkey | 1999 | 5 | 0 |
| Turkey | 2000 | 6 | 0 |
| Turkey | 2001 | 7 | 1 |
| Turkey | 2002 | 2 | 0 |
| Turkey | 2003 | 5 | 0 |
| Total | | 42 | 1 |

Scores and results list Turkey's goal tally first, score column indicates score after each Korkut goal.

List of international goals scored by Tayfun Korkut
| No. | Date | Venue | Opponent | Score | Result | Competition |
|---|---|---|---|---|---|---|
| 1 | 2 June 2001 | BJK İnönü Stadium, Istanbul, Turkey | Azerbaijan | 1–0 | 3–0 | 2002 World Cup qualifier |

== Managerial statistics ==
As of match played 12 March 2022

Managerial record by team and tenure
| Team | From | To | Record | | | | | | | | Ref |
| Team | From | To | G | W | D | L | GF | GA | GD | Win % | Ref |
|---|---|---|---|---|---|---|---|---|---|---|---|
| Hannover 96 | 31 December 2013 | 20 April 2015 | 48 | 15 | 11 | 22 | 58 | 80 | −22 | 31.25 | |
| 1. FC Kaiserslautern | 17 June 2016 | 27 December 2016 | 18 | 4 | 7 | 7 | 14 | 19 | −5 | 22.22 | |
| Bayer Leverkusen | 6 March 2017 | 30 June 2017 | 12 | 2 | 6 | 4 | 17 | 17 | +0 | 16.67 | |
| VfB Stuttgart | 29 January 2018 | 7 October 2018 | 22 | 10 | 6 | 6 | 26 | 25 | +1 | 45.45 | |
| Hertha BSC | 29 November 2021 | 13 March 2022 | 14 | 2 | 3 | 9 | 15 | 36 | −21 | 14.29 | |
| Total | | | 114 | 33 | 33 | 48 | 130 | 177 | −47 | 28.95 | — |
