= 2011–12 SC Freiburg season =

SC Freiburg
2011–12 season
- Chairman: Fritz Keller
- Manager: Marcus Sorg
- Stadium: Badenova-Stadion; Freiburg, Germany
- Bundesliga: 12th
- DFB-Pokal: First round
- Top goalscorer: League: Papiss Cissé (9); All: Papiss Cissé (9)
Home colours	Away colours	Third colours

The 2011–12 season of SC Freiburg is the club's 14th season in the Bundesliga, the highest division in German football, and the third consecutive season since promotion in 2009. It is the club's first season with Marcus Sorg as manager. The season began on 20 June with their first training session.

== Off-season ==
Beg Ferati from Basel became the first official signing of Freiburg's 2011–12 season upon confirmation on 7 March 2011. Further signings were 1. FC Nürnberg goalkeeper Daniel Batz and forward Garra Dembélé from Levski Sofia. Also Ivica Banović returned from his loan spell at MSV Duisburg, whilst Christian Bickel and Simon Brandstetter joined from the club's own reserve squad.
Furthermore, Freiburg began the season with a new manager, Marcus Sorg, after the previous manager Robin Dutt moved to Bayer Leverkusen. Sorg had been in charge of the club's reserves team.

=== Summer transfers ===
In:

No.	Pos.	Nation	Player
4	DF	SUI	Beg Ferati (from Basel)
11	FW	MLI	Garra Dembélé (from Levski Sofia)
19	GK	GER	Daniel Batz (from 1. FC Nürnberg)
20	DF	GER	Andreas Hinkel (from Free Agent)
29	MF	GER	Christian Bickel (from Reserves)
33	FW	GER	Simon Brandstetter (from Reserves)

Out:

No.	Pos.	Nation	Player
1	GK	FRA	Simon Pouplin (to Free agent)
11	FW	FRA	Jonathan Jäger (to Free agent)
13	FW	DEN	Tommy Bechmann (to SønderjyskE)
14	MF	CRO	Zvonko Pamić (to MSV Duisburg)
20	MF	CRO	Ivica Banović (to Energie Cottbus)
28	DF	USA	Danny Williams (to 1899 Hoffenheim)
31	MF	GER	Nicolas Höfler (to Erzgebirge Aue)
58	DF	GER	Ömer Toprak (to Bayer Leverkusen)

=== Mid-season transfers ===
In:

No.	Pos.	Nation	Player
9	FW	CRO	Ivan Santini (from Zadar)
13	DF	SEN	Diagné Fallou (from Metz)
16	DF	DEN	Michael Lumb (from Zenit (on loan))
25	DF	GER	Oliver Sorg (from Reserves)
28	MF	GER	Matthias Ginter (from Reserves)
31	MF	SVK	Karim Guédé (from Slovan Bratislava)
35	FW	GER	Sebastian Freis (from 1.FC Köln)
36	GK	GER	Alexander Schwolow (from Reserves)
41	DF	GER	Immanuel Höhn (from Reserves)

Out:

No.	Pos.	Nation	Player
3	DF	GER	Felix Bastians (to Hertha BSC)
5	DF	GER	Heiko Butscher (to Eintracht Frankfurt)
6	MF	MAR	Yacine Abdessadki (to Free agent)
9	FW	SEN	Papiss Cissé (to Newcastle United)
10	MF	ROU	Maximilian Nicu (to 1860 Munich)
21	GK	GER	Manuel Salz (to Reserves)
22	FW	JPN	Kisho Yano (to Albirex Niigata)
29	MF	GER	Christian Bickel (to Jahn Regensburg)

== Competitions ==
=== Bundesliga ===
==== League table ====
Pos	Team	Pld	W	D	L	GF	GA	GD	Pts
10	1. FC Nürnberg	34	12	6	16	38	49	−11	42
11	1899 Hoffenheim	34	10	11	13	41	47	−6	41
12	SC Freiburg	34	10	10	14	45	61	−16	40
13	FSV Mainz 05	34	9	12	13	47	51	−4	39
14	FC Augsburg	34	8	14	12	36	49	−13	38

Source: kicker
Rules for classification: 1) points; 2) goal difference; 3) number of goals scored.

==== Matches ====
6 August 2011 1	FC Augsburg	2–2	SC Freiburg	Augsburg
15:30	De Jong (yellow card) 5'; Werner (yellow card) 10'; Mölders 53'; Mölders 81'	Report	Barth (yellow card) 29'; Cissé 48'; Makiadi 55'; Caligiuri (yellow card) 61'; Mujdža (yellow card) 85'; Flum (yellow card) 90'	Stadium: SGL arena Attendance: 30,403; Referee: Dr. Jochen Drees

13 August 2011 2	SC Freiburg	1–2	Mainz 05	Freiburg
15:30	Cissé 91'	Report	Choupo-Moting (yellow card) 5', (goal) 79'; Risse 64', (yellow card) 90+3'	Stadium: Dreisamstadion; Attendance: 20,600; Referee: Thorsten Kinhöfer

20 August 2011 3	Werder Bremen	5–3	SC Freiburg	Bremen
15:30	Fritz 30'; Pizarro 34'; Arnautović 65'; Schmitz (yellow card) 71'; Hunt 87' (pen.); Wesley 90+3'	Summary	Cissé 7', 48'; Schuster (yellow card) 60'; Flum (yellow card) 64'; Reisinger (yellow card) 75', (goal) 84'; Krmaš (yellow card) 86'	Stadium: Weserstadion; Attendance: 39,201; Referee: Peter Sippel

27 August 2011 4	SC Freiburg	3–0	VfL Wolfsburg	Freiburg
15:30	Barth 30'; Jendrišek 40'; Makiadi 59'	Summary	Russ (yellow card) 58'; Cale (yellow card) 88'	Stadium: Dreisamstadion; Attendance: 20,000; Referee: Christian Dingert

10 September 2011 5	Bayern Munich	7–0	SC Freiburg	Munich
15:30	Gómez 8', 52', 55', 72' (pen.); Ribéry 26', 41'; Petersen 90'	Summary		Stadium: Allianz Arena; Attendance: 69,000; Referee: Tobias Welz

16 September 2011 6	SC Freiburg	1–2	VfB Stuttgart	Freiburg
20:45	Makiadi (yellow card) 12'; Barth (yellow card) 30'; Jendrišek (yellow card) 77'; Cissé 84'	Summary	Kvist (yellow card) 14'; Harnik 33', 73'; Okazaki (yellow card) 58'; Molinaro (yellow card) 68'; Cacau (yellow card) 85'	Stadium: Dreisamstadion; Attendance: 24,000; Referee: Guido Winkmann

24 September 2011 7	Schalke 04	4–2	SC Freiburg	Gelsenkirchen
15:30	Farfán 33'; Papadopoulos (yellow card) 45'; Huntelaar 62'; Holtby 67'; Raúl 75'	Summary	Cissé 3'; Schuster (yellow card) 31'; Jendrišek 83'	Stadium: Arena AufSchalke; Attendance: 60,545; Referee: Markus Wingenbach

1 October 2011 8	SC Freiburg	1–0	Borussia Mönchengladbach	Freiburg
15:30	Flum 19', (yellow card) 33'; Krmaš (yellow card) 21'		Marx (yellow card) 66'; Bobadilla (yellow card) 89'	Stadium: Dreisamstadion; Attendance: 24,000; Referee: Markus Schmidt

16 October 2011 9	SC Freiburg	1–2	Hamburger SV	Freiburg
15:30	Schuster (yellow card) 24'; Cissé 47'	Summary	Son 12'; Kačar (yellow card) 21'; Petrić (yellow card) 45'; Iličević 73'; Drobný (yellow card) 90+3'	Stadium: Dreisamstadion; Attendance: 24,000; Referee: Deniz Aytekin

22 October 2011 10	1. FC Kaiserslautern	1–0	SC Freiburg	Kaiserslautern
15:30	Shechter 75'	Summary	Krmaš (yellow card) 20'; Baumann (yellow card) 77'; Hinkel (yellow card) 81'; Barth (yellow card) 83'	Stadium: Fritz Walter Stadion; Attendance: 40,748; Referee: Robert Hartmann

28 October 2011 11	SC Freiburg	0–1	Bayer Leverkusen	Freiburg
20:30	Cissé (yellow card) 79'		Ballack 2'	Stadium: Dreisamstadion; Attendance: 22,300; Referee: Marco Fritz

5 November 2011 12	1. FC Nürnberg	1–2	SC Freiburg	Nuremberg
15:30	Pinola (yellow card) 13'; Frantz 32'; Wollscheid (yellow card) 54'; Esswein (yellow card) 64'; Stephan (yellow card) 90+2'		Rosenthal 34'; Hinkel (yellow card) 60'; Cissé 90+3' (pen.)	Stadium: Frankenstadion; Attendance: 38,026; Referee: Christian Dingert

19 November 2011 13	SC Freiburg	2–2	Hertha BSC	Freiburg
15:30	Reisinger 61', 90+5'; Makiadi (yellow card) 76'; Cissé (yellow card) 80'		Ramos 20'; Niemeyer 45+1'; Raffael (yellow card) 69'; Ottl (yellow card) 80'; Ebert (yellow card) 81'; Kobiashvili (yellow card) 89'; Kraft (yellow card) 90+3'	Stadium: Dreisamstadion; Attendance: 21,500; Referee: Markus Wingenbach

26 November 2011 14	1899 Hoffenheim	1–1	SC Freiburg	Sinsheim
15:30	Firmino 24'; Compper (yellow card) 53'; Williams (yellow card) 85'		Putsila (yellow card) 34'; Makiadi (yellow card) 70'; Schuster (yellow card) 86'; Dembélé 90'	Stadium: Rhein-Neckar-Arena; Attendance: 28,250; Referee: Deniz Aytekin

3 December 2011 15	SC Freiburg	1–1	Hannover 96	Freiburg
15:30	Cissé 67'; Flum (yellow card) 90+3'		Bastians 44' (o.g.); Rausch (yellow card) 60'; Pinto (yellow card) 82'	Stadium: Dreisamstadion; Attendance: 20,000; Referee: Dr. Jochen Drees

10 December 2011 16	1. FC Köln	4–0	SC Freiburg	Cologne
15:30	Clemens 19', 65'; Sereno (yellow card) 39'; Podolski 61', 73'		Bastians (yellow card) 37'; Schuster (yellow card) 54'	Stadium: RheinEnergieStadion; Attendance: 44,500; Referee: Marco Fritz

17 December 2011 17	SC Freiburg	1–4	Borussia Dortmund	Freiburg
15:30	Rosenthal 34', (yellow card) 40'		Lewandowski 7', 71', (yellow card) 78'; Gündoğan 44'; Großkreutz 59'	Stadium: Dreisamstadion; Attendance: 24,000; Referee: Günter Perl

21 January 2012 18	SC Freiburg	1–0	FC Augsburg	Freiburg
15:30	Flum (yellow card) 87'; Ginter 88'		Werner (yellow card) 49'; De Jong (yellow card) 67'; Verhaegh (yellow card) 90+1'	Stadium: Dreisamstadion; Attendance: 19,600; Referee: Florian Meyer

29 January 2012 19	Mainz 05	3–1	SC Freiburg	Mainz
15:30	Choupo-Moting 3', 17'; Polanski 6'; Noveski (yellow card) 59'; Bungert (yellow card) 69'		Diagne (red card) 4'; Ginter (yellow card) 51'; Krmaš 68'; Schmid (yellow card) 78'	Stadium: Coface Arena; Attendance: 30,938; Referee: Markus Schmidt

5 February 2012 20	SC Freiburg	2–2	Werder Bremen	Freiburg
15:30	Makiadi 32'; Schmid 70'; Jendrišek (yellow card) 75'; Caligiuri (yellow card) 79'		Pizarro (yellow card) 28', (goal) 29'; Pizarro 47'; Ekici (yellow card) 53'	Stadium: Dreisamstadion; Attendance: 22,000; Referee: Dr. Felix Brych

10 February 2012 21	VfL Wolfsburg	3–2	SC Freiburg	Wolfsburg
20:30	Jiráček 5', 61'; Schäfer 14'; Dejagah (yellow card) 69'; Rodríguez (yellow card) 71'		Flum 11'; Caligiuri 38'; Freis (yellow card) 79'	Stadium: Volkswagen-Arena; Attendance: 23,057; Referee: Christian Dingert

18 February 2012 22	SC Freiburg	0–0	Bayern Munich	Freiburg
18:30	Diagne (yellow card) 8'; Rosenthal (yellow card) 70'		Ribéry (yellow card) 51'	Stadium: Dreisamstadion; Attendance: 24,000; Referee: Peter Gagelmann

25 February 2012 23	VfB Stuttgart	4–1	SC Freiburg	Stuttgart
15:30	Harnik 12', 82'; Okazaki 21'; Boulahrouz 62'		Diagne 27'	Stadium: Mercedes-Benz Arena; Attendance: 46,000; Referee: Wolfgang Stark

3 March 2012 24	SC Freiburg	2–1	Schalke 04	Freiburg
15:30	Freis 18'; Caligiuri (yellow card) 63', (goal) 66' (pen.); Höhn (yellow card) 86'		Papadopoulos (yellow card) 34' (red card) 87'; Jones (yellow card) 60'; Pukki 72'	Stadium: Dreisamstadion; Attendance: 24,000; Referee: Marco Fritz

10 March 2012 25	Borussia Mönchengladbach	0–0	SC Freiburg	Mönchengladbach
15:30	Stranzl (yellow card) 61'; Jantschke (yellow card) 90+1'		Caligiuri (yellow card) 46'	Stadium: Borussia-Park; Attendance: 52,207; Referee: Peter Sippel

17 March 2012 26	Hamburger SV	1–3	SC Freiburg	Hamburg
15:30	Iličević 75'		Flum 20'; Caligiuri 43'; Sorg (yellow card) 49'; Makiadi (yellow card) 70' (goal) 72'; Mujdža (yellow card) 82'	Stadium: Imtech Arena; Attendance: 52,414; Referee: Tobias Stieler

24 March 2012 27	SC Freiburg	2–0	1. FC Kaiserslautern	Freiburg
15:30	Guédé 8'; Makiadi 14'; Diagne (yellow card) 37'; Freis (yellow card) 89'		Borysiuk (yellow card) 85'	Stadium: Dreisamstadion; Attendance: 24,000; Referee: Florian Meyer

31 March 2012 28	Bayer Leverkusen	0–2	SC Freiburg	Leverkusen
15:30	Kadlec (yellow card) 64'		Schuster 8'; Guédé (yellow card) 28'; Caligiuri 60'; Freis (yellow card) 77'; Reisinger (yellow card) 86'	Stadium: BayArena; Attendance: 28,342; Referee: Robert Hartmann

7 April 2012 29	SC Freiburg	2–2	1. FC Nürnberg	Freiburg
15:30	Makiadi (yellow card) 21', (goal) 79'; Flum (yellow card) 31'; Caligiuri 53'; Sorg (yellow card) 73'		Didavi 8'; Feulner (yellow card) 13'; Pekhart 45+2'; Nilsson (yellow card) 52'; Maroh (yellow card) 66'; Balitsch (yellow card) 79'	Stadium: Dreisamstadion; Attendance: 24,000; Referee: Thorsten Kinhöfer

10 April 2012 30	Hertha BSC	1–2	SC Freiburg	Berlin
20:00	Lell (yellow card) 72'; Hubnik 81'; Torun (yellow card) 82'; Ebert (yellow card) 89'; Kraft (yellow card) 90+2'		Hubnik 7' (o.g.); Freis 67'; Dembélé (yellow card) 80'	Stadium: Olympiastadion; Attendance: 45,778; Referee: Peter Gagelmann

15 April 2012 31	SC Freiburg	0–0	1899 Hoffenheim	Freiburg
17:30	Dembélé (yellow card) 10'		Rudy (yellow card) 56'	Stadium: Dreisamstadion; Attendance: 23,500; Referee: Deniz Aytekin

22 April 2012 32	Hannover 96	0–0	SC Freiburg	Hanover
17:30	Rausch (yellow card) 86'		Freis (yellow card) 68'	Stadium: AWD-Arena; Attendance: 48,000; Referee: Guido Winkmann

28 April 2012 33	SC Freiburg	4–1	1. FC Köln	Freiburg
15:30	Mujdža 36'; Guédé 54'; Caligiuri 84'; Freis 90+1'		Podolski 47'; McKenna (yellow card) 76'	Stadium: Dreisamstadion; Attendance: 24,000; Referee: Wolfgang Stark

5 May 2012 34	Borussia Dortmund	4–0	SC Freiburg	Dortmund
15:30	Błaszczykowski 4', 39'; Lewandowski 20', 27'		Makiadi (yellow card) 32'	Stadium: Westfalenstadion; Attendance: 80,720; Referee: Peter Sippel

=== DFB-Pokal ===
Freiburg's DFB-Pokal campaign ended up as a disappointment after being eliminated in the first round by third division side Unterhaching.

Sun 31 July 2011	SpVgg Unterhaching	3–2	SC Freiburg	Unterhaching
14:30	Sternisko 17'; Tunjić 47' (pen.), 87' (pen.)		Makiadi 9'; Reisinger 74'	Stadium: Generali Sportpark; Attendance: 5,000; Referee: Guido Winkmann

== Players ==
Squad Season 2011–12
No.	Player	Nat.	Birthdate	at SCF since	previous club	BL matches	BL goals	Cup matches	Cup goals
Goalkeepers
1	Oliver Baumann	German	2 Jun 1990	2000	FC Bad Krozingen	33	0	1	0
19	Daniel Batz	German	12 Jan 1991	2011	1. FC Nürnberg	1	0	0	0
36	Alexander Schwolow	German	2 Jun 1992	2008	Wehen Wiesbaden	0	0	0	0
Defenders
2	Pavel Krmaš	Czech	3 Mar 1980	2007	Teplice	19	1	0	0
4	Beg Ferati	Swiss	10 Nov 1986	2011	Basel	6	0	1	0
13	Fallou Diagne	Senegalese	14 Aug 1989	2012	Metz	15	1	0	0
15	Oliver Barth	German	6 Oct 1979	2007	Fortuna Düsseldorf	12	1	1	0
16	Michael Lumb	Danish	9 Jan 1988	2012	Zenit	5	0	0	0
20	Andreas Hinkel	German	26 Mar 1982	2011	Celtic	7	0	0	0
24	Mensur Mujdža	Bosnian	28 Mar 1984	2009	NK Zagreb	14	1	1	0
25	Oliver Sorg	German	29 May 1990	2006	Singen 04	17	0	0	0
41	Immanuel Höhn	German	23 Dec 1991	2008	FK Pirmasens	8	0	0	0
Midfielders
7	Cédric Makiadi	Congolese	23 Feb 1984	2009	MSV Duisburg	33	6	1	1
8	Jan Rosenthal	German	7 Apr 1986	2010	Hannover 96	18	2	0	0
14	Anton Putsila	Belarusian	19 Jun 1987	2010	Dinamo Minsk	19	0	0	0
17	Jonathan Schmid	French	26 Jun 1990	2008	Offenburger FV	22	1	0	0
18	Johannes Flum	German	14 Dec 1987	2008	SC Pfullendorf	30	3	0	0
23	Julian Schuster (captain)	German	15 Apr 1985	2008	VfB Stuttgart	21	1	1	0
28	Matthias Ginter	German	19 Jan 1994	2008	SV March	13	1	0	0
31	Karim Guédé	Slovak	7 Jan 1985	2012	Slovan Bratislava	10	2	0	0
40	Daniel Caligiuri	German	15 Jan 1988	2005	SV Zimmern	25	6	1	0
Strikers
9	Ivan Santini	Croatian	21 May 1989	2012	Zadar	10	0	0	0
11	Garra Dembélé	Malian	21 Feb 1986	2011	Levski Sofia	16	1	1	0
26	Erik Jendrišek	Slovak	26 Oct 1986	2011	Schalke 04	19	2	1	0
27	Stefan Reisinger	German	14 Sep 1981	2009	Greuther Fürth	25	3	1	1
33	Simon Brandstetter	German	2 May 1990	2009	Stuttgarter Kickers	0	0	0	0
35	Sebastian Freis	German	23 Apr 1985	2012	1. FC Köln	15	3	0	0
Outgoing Players
21	Manuel Salz	German	6 Aug 1985	2009	Stuttgarter Kickers	0	0	0	0
3	Felix Bastians	German	9 May 1988	2009	Young Boys	16	0	1	0
5	Heiko Butscher	German	28 Jul 1980	2007	Bochum	8	0	1	0
28	Danny Williams	American	8 Mar 1989	2004	Karlsruher SC	1	0	0	0
6	Yacine Abdessadki	Maroccan	1 Jan 1981	2008	Strasbourg	11	0	0	0
10	Maximilian Nicu	Romanian	25 Nov 1982	2010	Hertha BSC	4	0	1	0
29	Christian Bickel	German	27 Jan 1991	2009	Rot-Weiß Erfurt	0	0	1	0
9	Papiss Cissé	Senegalese	3 Jun 1985	2010	Metz	17	9	0	0
22	Kisho Yano	Japanese	5 Apr 1984	2010	Albirex Niigata	0	0	0	0
Last updated: 6 August 2011

== Kits ==
Home	Home Alternate	Away	Away Alternate	Third
