= Oliver Sorg =

German footballer

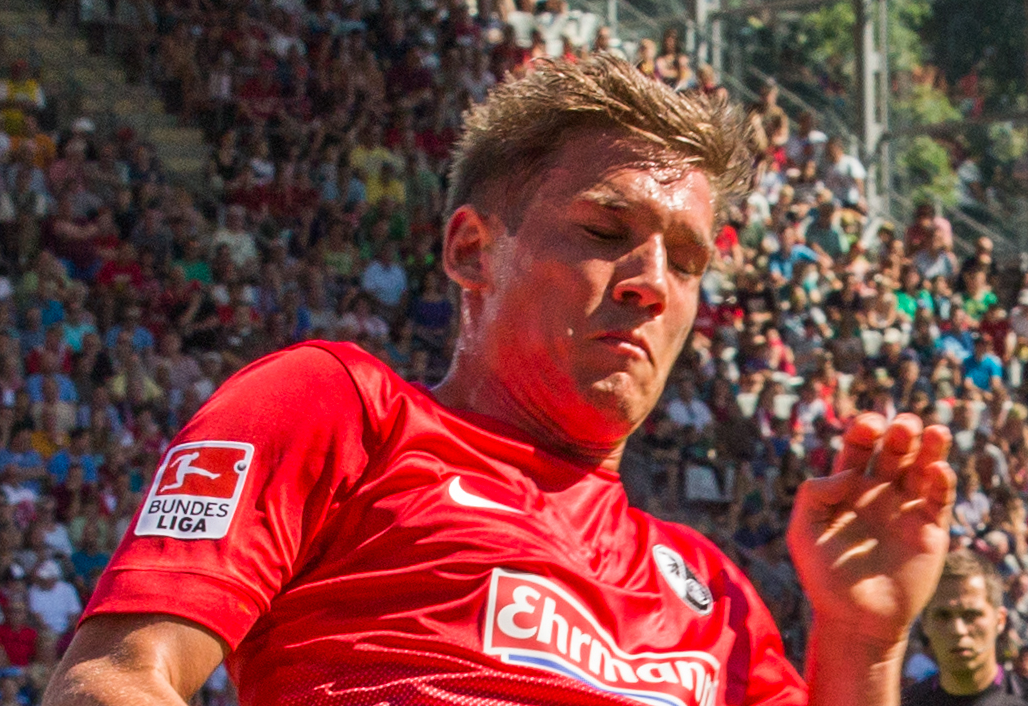
- Sorg playing for SC Freiburg in 2014

Personal information
- Date of birth: 29 May 1990 (age 36)
- Place of birth: Engen, West Germany
- Height: 1.75 m (5 ft 9 in)
- Position: Right back

Youth career
- 1996–2003: Hegauer FV
- 2003–2006: Singen 04
- 2006–2009: SC Freiburg

Senior career*
Years	Team	Apps	(Gls)
2009–2012	SC Freiburg II	68	(1)
2012–2015	SC Freiburg	105	(3)
2015–2019	Hannover 96	87	(0)
2019–2021	1. FC Nürnberg	33	(0)
2022–2023	FC Radolfzell		

International career
2012–2013	Germany U21	5	(0)
2014	Germany	1	(0)
- * Club domestic league appearances and goals

Oliver Sorg (born 29 May 1990) is a German former professional footballer who played as a right back. A veteran of three relegations from and one promotion to the Bundesliga, Sorg has played four seasons at SC Freiburg and four seasons at Hannover 96. He also earned a cap for Germany in 2014.

== Club career ==
Sorg began playing football for local club Hegauer FV, and moved to nearby club FC Singen 04 at the age of 13. After three years at Singen, Sorg signed for SC Freiburg, at the time in the 2. Bundesliga. Sorg spent two seasons with Freiburg's youth team in the Under 19 Bundesliga, winning the competition in his first season and winning the Süd/Südwest division in his second. In addition, Sorg won the German Youth Cup in 2009, all while playing for future first team manager Christian Streich.

=== SC Freiburg ===
Sorg was promoted to the second team at Freiburg in 2009, playing under manager Marcus Sorg. Marcus Sorg was named manager of the first team before the 2011–12 Bundesliga season, but was sacked after the club finished the Hinrunde bottom of the table. Oliver Sorg's manager with the youth team, Streich, was promoted to manager, and brought Sorg with him to the first team. His Bundesliga debut came on 21 January 2012 in a 1–0 victory over FC Augsburg. Sorg signed his first professional contract two days later. Sorg played every minute of the rest of the campaign as the club finished the season in 12th position, moving to left-back for the last half after Mensur Mujdža returned from injury.

Sorg played in all but two matches the following Bundesliga campaign as Freiburg recorded a fifth-place finish, guaranteeing them European football for the first time in 12 years. He spent time at both full-back positions, and led the league in interceptions. Sorg was also a part of the most successful DFB-Pokal campaign of his career this season, as Freiburg reached the semi-finals. Sorg missed their second round defeat of Eintracht Braunschweig with injury, and was replaced by striker Ivan Santini with half an hour to play during their semi-final match against VfB Stuttgart, as Freiburg were losing 2–1.

Sorg scored his first senior goal on 24 August 2013, Freiburg's first in a 3–3 draw with 1899 Hoffenheim. Freiburg did not advance past the group stage in their Europa League campaign, and Sorg played in five of their six matches, missing the home draw with Estoril with injury. Threatened with relegation after not winning any of their first 10 matches, Freiburg won five of seven from mid-March to mid-April, guaranteeing their safety with two matches to spare. Sorg finished the season with 31 starts, missing one game to injury and two to suspension.

During the 2014–15 season, Sorg extended his contract, due to expire in the summer, by one season. However, following Freiburg's relegation from the Bundesliga, Sorg left the club after the season anyway.

=== Hannover 96 ===
On 10 June 2015, Sorg joined Hannover 96 after Freiburg was relegated from Bundesliga.

Sorg began the 2018–19 Bundesliga as first-choice in the back line of manager André Breitenreiter, either as a right-back or a right-sided centre-half, depending on the formation used. Sorg started the first six matches of the season, but an injury kept him out of the squad for what would be Hannover's first win of the season, a 3–1 victory over VfB Stuttgart. Entering the defense in place of Sorg was Josip Elez, and Elez kept his place when Sorg regained fitness after two matches out. Sorg wouldn't see action until 9 December, a 1–1 draw with 1. FSV Mainz 05 in which Sorg was sent off right before the final whistle. He started the club's last two matches of the first half, finishing with 9 starts out of 18 as Hannover were four points adrift from guaranteed safety. Sorg picked up an injury in the first game of the second half, and did not return to the team until 3 March. However, Sorg would go on to start 8 of the club's final 11 games of the season, finishing the year with 18 starts. Hannover were relegated, ending their two-year stay in the top flight.

=== 1. FC Nürnberg ===
In May 2019, it was announced Sorg would join 1. FC Nürnberg, who were also relegated from the Bundesliga, upon the expiration of his contract with Hannover 96 at the end of the 2018–19 season. Between 2011/12 and 2020/21 Sorg amassed more than 220 league matches in the two top divisions of the German league pyramid.

== International career ==
Sorg made his international debut with the Germany under-21 team, appearing in a friendly with Argentina's under-20 team on 14 August 2012. Germany were in the middle of a qualifying campaign for the 2013 UEFA European Under-21 Championship, and Sorg started the final game of their group stage, with qualification to the play-offs already ensured. An injury to regular right-back Sebastian Jung created an opening at the position for the tournament, and Sorg started Germany's first two group stage games at right-back. Two defeats meant the Germany would not advance, and Sorg was left out for their final game, against Russia.

Sorg received his first senior call-up in a friendly against Poland on 13 May 2014. Few regular full internationals were present in the squad, and only six players who participated in the match were included in Germany's victorious World Cup squad. It was his only appearance for the Germany's full A team.

== Career statistics ==
As of 1 August 2020

Appearances and goals by club, season and competition
Club	Season	League			Cup		Continental		Other		Total	
Club	Season	Division	Apps	Goals	Apps	Goals	Apps	Goals	Apps	Goals	Apps	Goals
SC Freiburg II	2009–10	Regionalliga Süd	18	0	—		—		—		18	0
SC Freiburg II	2010–11	Regionalliga Süd	30	1	—		—		—		30	1
SC Freiburg II	2011–12	Regionalliga Süd	20	0	—		—		—		20	0
SC Freiburg II	Total		68	1	—		—		—		68	1
SC Freiburg	2011–12	Bundesliga	17	0	0	0	—		—		17	0
SC Freiburg	2012–13	Bundesliga	32	0	4	0	—		—		36	0
SC Freiburg	2013–14	Bundesliga	31	2	3	0	5 (Note: Appearances in the UEFA Europa League.)	0	—		39	2
SC Freiburg	2014–15	Bundesliga	25	1	2	0	—		—		27	1
SC Freiburg	Total		105	3	9	0	5	0	–		119	3
Hannover 96	2015–16	Bundesliga	20	0	0	0	—		—		20	0
Hannover 96	2016–17	2. Bundesliga	26	0	2	0	—		—		28	0
Hannover 96	2017–18	Bundesliga	22	0	1	0	—		—		23	0
Hannover 96	2018–19	Bundesliga	19	0	1	0	—		—		20	0
Hannover 96	Total		87	0	4	0	–		–		91	0
1. FC Nürnberg	2019–20	2. Bundesliga	25	0	2	0	–		–		27	0
Career total			285	4	15	0	5	0	-		305	4
