= 2013–14 SC Freiburg season =

SC Freiburg
2013–14 season
- Chairman: Fritz Keller
- Manager: Christian Streich
- Bundesliga: 14th
- DFB-Pokal: Third round
- Europa League: Group stage
- Top goalscorer: League: Admir Mehmedi (12); All: Admir Mehmedi (13)

The 2013–14 SC Freiburg season was the 110th season in the club's football history. In addition to the Bundesliga at promoted to 2. Bundesliga in 2009, the club also competed in the DFB-Pokal and the Europa League.

== Fixtures and results ==
=== Legend ===
Win Draw Loss Postponed

=== Bundesliga ===
==== League table ====
Pos	Team	Pld	W	D	L	GF	GA	GD	Pts	Qualification or relegation
12	Werder Bremen	34	10	9	15	42	66	−24	39	
13	Eintracht Frankfurt	34	9	9	16	40	57	−17	36	
14	SC Freiburg	34	9	9	16	43	61	−18	36	
15	VfB Stuttgart	34	8	8	18	49	62	−13	32	
16	Hamburger SV (O)	34	7	6	21	51	75	−24	27	Qualification for the relegation play-offs

Source: DFB
Rules for classification: 1) points; 2) goal difference; 3) number of goals scored.
(O) Play-off winners

==== League fixtures and results ====
MD	Date^{1}	Venue	Opponent	Result^{2}	Att.	Goalscorers		Table		Ref.
MD	Date^{1}	Venue	Opponent	Result^{2}	Att.	SC Freiburg	Opponent	Pos.	Pts	Ref.
1	10 August – 15:30	A	Bayer Leverkusen	1–3	27,136	Hanke 40'	Kießling 22'; Son 47'; Sam 53'	T14	0	
2	17 August – 15:30	H	Mainz 05	1–2	23,100	Freis 71'	Zimling 64'; Müller 68'	16	0	
3	24 August – 15:30	A	1899 Hoffenheim	3-3	24,118	Sorg 13'; Guédé 29'; Freis 65'	Salihović 9'; Volland 25'; Strobl 77'	14	1	
4	27 August – 18:30	H	Bayern Munich	1-1	24,000	Höfler 86'	Shaqiri 33'	17	2	
5	14 September – 15:30	A	FC Augsburg	1–2	28,453	Mehmedi 46'	Altıntop 62'; Werner 89'	17	2	
6	22 September – 15:30	H	Hertha BSC	1–1	23,200	Mehmedi 6'	Skjelbred 38'	17	3	
7	28 September – 15:30	A	Borussia Dortmund	0–5	80,000	—	Reus 35', 45+2' (pen.); Lewandowski 58', 70'; Błaszczykowski 79'	17	3	
8	6 October – 17:30	H	Eintracht Frankfurt	1–1	23,300	Höfler 85'	Günter 64' (o.g.)	17	4	
9	19 October – 15:30	A	Werder Bremen	0–0	40,423	—	—	17	5	
10	27 October – 15:30	H	Hamburger SV	0–3	24,000	—	Beister 37'; Lasogga 47'; Van der Vaart 63'	17	5	
11	2 November – 15:30	A	1. FC Nürnberg	3–0	37,069	Klaus 57'; Darida 79'; Mehmedi 88'	—	16	8	
12	10 November – 17:30	H	VfB Stuttgart	1–3	23,700	Hanke 78'	Ibišević 9'; Werner 10', 82'	16	8	
13	23 November – 15:30	A	Eintracht Braunschweig	1–0	21,810	Fernandes 52'	—	16	11	
14	1 December – 17:30	A	Borussia Mönchengladbach	0–1	50,084	—	Raffael 63'	16	11	
15	8 December – 15:30	H	VfL Wolfsburg	0–3	22,800	—	Arnold 8'; Olić 11'; Schäfer 90+1'	16	11	
16	15 December – 15:30	A	Schalke 04	0–2	60,661	—	Höfler 44' (o.g.); Farfán 67' (pen.)	16	11	
17	21 December – 15:30	H	Hannover 96	2–1	23,200	Mehmedi 25', 36'	Bittencourt 90+3'	16	14	
18	25 January – 15:30	H	Bayer Leverkusen	3–2	22,100	Mehmedi 27'; Schmid 53'; Klaus 90'	Bender 4'; Rolfes 35'	15	17	
19	1 February – 15:30	A	Mainz 05	0–2	27,247	—	Park 24'; Koo 86'	16	17	
20	8 February – 15:30	H	1899 Hoffenheim	1–1	22,300	Schmid 68'	Modeste 85'	15	18	
21	15 February – 15:30	A	Bayern Munich	0–4	71,000	—	Dante 19'; Shaqiri 34', 42'; Pizarro 88'	16	18	
22	22 February – 15:30	H	FC Augsburg	2–4	22,000	Schmid 17'; Mehmedi 73'	Werner 7'; Verhaegh 78'; Altıntop 84'; Hahn 90+4'	17	18	
23	28 February – 20:30	A	Hertha BSC	0–0	37,920	—	—	17	19	
24	9 March – 15:30	H	Borussia Dortmund	0–1	24,000	—	Kehl 58'	17	19	
25	16 March – 17:30	A	Eintracht Frankfurt	4–1	45,400	Schuster 34'; Guédé 54', 90+3'; Klaus 70'	Joselu 59'	16	22	
26	21 March – 20:30	H	Werder Bremen	3–1	24,000	Schuster 15'; Klaus 53'; Mehmedi 59'	Petersen 70'	14	25	
27	26 March - 20:00	A	Hamburger SV	1–1	44,629	Darida 50'	Lasogga 55'	15	26	
28	29 March - 18:30	H	1. FC Nürnberg	3–2	24,000	Krmaš 23'; Mehmedi 53' (pen.); Klaus 65'	Pogatetz 7'; Drmić 45' (pen.)	14	29	
29	5 April – 15:30	A	VfB Stuttgart	0–2	58,500	—	Maxim 69'; Harnik 89'	14	29	
30	12 April – 15:30	H	Eintracht Braunschweig	2–0	24,000	Vrančić 8' (o.g.); Schuster 48'	—	14	32	
31	19 April – 15:30	H	Borussia Mönchengladbach	4–2	24,000	Mehmedi 51', 87'; Sorg 71'; Darida 72'	Herrmann 10'; Nordtveit 89'	13	35	
32	26 April – 15:30	A	VfL Wolfsburg	2–2	28,255	Mehmedi 61'; Terrazzino 83'	Perišić 3', 70'	12	36	
33	3 May – 15:30	H	Schalke 04	0–2	24,000	—	Ayhan 13'; Huntelaar 65'	14	36	
34	10 May – 15:30	A	Hannover 96	2–3	48,600	Schmid 50'; Zulechner 78'	Huszti 45'; Rudņevs 65'; Prib 80'	14	36	

==== Results summary ====
Overall								Home						Away					
Pld	W	D	L	GF	GA	GD	Pts	W	D	L	GF	GA	GD	W	D	L	GF	GA	GD
8	0	4	4	9	18	−9	4	0	3	1	4	5	−1	0	1	3	5	13	−8

Last updated: 6 October 2013.

=== DFB-Pokal ===
Round	Date	Kickoff^{1}	Stadium	City	Opponent	Result^{2}	Attendance	Goalscorers		Source
Round	Date	Kickoff^{1}	Stadium	City	Opponent	Result^{2}	Attendance	SC Freiburg	Opponent	Source
FR	3 August	15:30	Parkstadion	Neustrelitz	TSG Neustrelitz	2–0	4,479	Zuck 113', 118'	—	
SR	25 September	20:30	Mage Solar Stadion	Freiburg	VfB Stuttgart	2–1	22,500	Ginter 52'; Hanke 70'	Ibišević 87'	
TR	4 December	19:00	Mage Solar Stadion	Freiburg	Bayer 04 Leverkusen	1–2	16,400	Ginter 19'	Kruse 1'; Can 77'	

=== Europa League ===
==== Group stage ====
===== Group fixtures and results =====
MD	Date	Kickoff^{1}	Stadium	City	Opponent	Result^{2}	Attendance	Goalscorers		Table		Source
MD	Date	Kickoff^{1}	Stadium	City	Opponent	Result^{2}	Attendance	SC Freiburg	Opponent	Pos.	Pts	Source
1	19 September	21:05	Mage Solar Stadion	Freiburg	Slovan Liberec	2–2	14,100	Schuster 23' (pen.); Mehmedi 35'	Kalytvyntsev 67'; Rabušic 74'	2	1	
2	3 October	19:00	Ramón Sánchez Pizjuán Stadium	Seville	Sevilla	0–2	18,000	–	Perotti 63' (pen.); Bacca 90+1'	3	1	
3	24 October	19:00	Mage Solar Stadion	Freiburg	Estoril	1–1	14,500	Darida 11'	Sebá 53'	3	2	
4	7 November	21:05	Estádio António Coimbra da Mota	Estoril	Estoril	0–0	2,014	—	—	3	3	
5	28 November	19:00	Stadion u Nisy	Liberec	Slovan Liberec	2–1	8,800	Ginter 23'; Coquelin 73'	Rybalka 81'	2	6	
6	12 December	21:05	Mage Solar Stadion	Freiburg	Sevilla	0–2	15,700	—	Iborra 40'; Rusescu 90+4'	3	6	

===== Group table =====
Pos	Team	Pld	W	D	L	GF	GA	GD	Pts	Qualification
1	(Spain) Sevilla	6	3	3	0	9	4	+5	12	Advance to knockout phase
2	(Czech Republic) Slovan Liberec	6	2	3	1	9	8	+1	9	Advance to knockout phase
3	(Germany) SC Freiburg	6	1	3	2	5	8	−3	6	
4	(Portugal) Estoril	6	0	3	3	5	8	−3	3	

Source: Soccerway

== Squad information ==
=== Transfers ===
In:

No.	Pos.	Nation	Player
4	MF	SUI	Gélson Fernandes (from Sporting CP)
5	DF	FRA	Christopher Jullien (from Auxerre)
7	MF	CZE	Vladimír Darida (from Viktoria Plzeň)
8	MF	CZE	Václav Pilař (on loan from VfL Wolfsburg)
9	FW	GER	Mike Hanke (from Borussia Mönchengladbach)
13	MF	GER	Nicolas Höfler (loan return from Erzgebirge Aue)
14	FW	SUI	Admir Mehmedi (on loan from Dynamo Kyiv)
20	MF	FRA	Francis Coquelin (on loan from Arsenal)
36	MF	GER	Felix Klaus (from SpVgg Greuther Fürth)
--	DF	SLO	Denis Perger (from FC Koper)

Out:

No.	Pos.	Nation	Player
7	MF	COD	Cédric Makiadi (to Werder Bremen)
8	MF	GER	Jan Rosenthal (to Eintracht Frankfurt)
9	FW	CRO	Ivan Santini (loan return to Zadar)
18	MF	GER	Johannes Flum (to Eintracht Frankfurt)
20	MF	GER	Max Kruse (to Borussia Mönchengladbach)
26	FW	SVK	Erik Jendrišek (to Energie Cottbus)
32	MF	GER	Marc Lais (to SV Sandhausen)
40	MF	GER	Daniel Caligiuri (to VfL Wolfsburg)
--	FW	GER	Simon Brandstetter (to FC Rot-Weiß Erfurt, previously on loan at Karlsruher SC)
--	DF	SUI	Beg Ferati (to FC Sion, previously on loan at FC Winterthur)
--	DF	SLO	Denis Perger (on loan at Wehen Wiesbaden)

== Notes ==
- 1.Kickoff is in Central European Time/Central European Summer Time.
- 2.SC Freiburg goals first.
