= Daniel Batz =

German footballer (born 1991)

Personal information
- Date of birth: 12 January 1991 (age 35)
- Place of birth: Erlangen, Germany
- Height: 1.89 m (6 ft 2 in)
- Position: Goalkeeper

Team information
- Current team: Borussia Mönchengladbach
- Number: 33

Youth career
- 1996–2003: SC Adelsdorf
- 2003–2005: Greuther Fürth
- 2005–2008: 1. FC Nürnberg

Senior career*
Years	Team	Apps	(Gls)
2008–2011	1. FC Nürnberg II	29	(0)
2010–2011	1. FC Nürnberg	0	(0)
2011–2015	SC Freiburg II	35	(0)
2012	→ SC Freiburg	1	(0)
2015–2016	Chemnitzer FC	2	(0)
2016–2017	SV Elversberg	52	(0)
2017–2023	1. FC Saarbrücken	204	(0)
2023–2026	Mainz 05	25	(0)
2026–	Borussia Mönchengladbach	1	(0)
- * Club domestic league appearances and goals as of 31 October 2026

Daniel Batz (born 12 January 1991) is a German professional footballer who plays as a goalkeeper for Bundesliga club Borussia Mönchengladbach.

== Personal life and education ==
Batz completed a bachelor´s degree in sportbusiness management at the iST University of Applied Science. Currently, he pursues a master´s of Business Administration (MBA) at the same university alongside his football career.

== Early career ==
Batz came through the youth ranks at SpVgg Greuter Fürth before joining the academy of 1. FC Nürnberg. At Nürnberg, he played for the reserve team in the Regionalliga before signing for FC Freiburg in 2011. At Freiburg, he made a one Bundesliga appearance.

== Career ==
In January 2016, Batz was released from his contract at Chemnitzer FC and joined SV Elversberg.

On 3 March 2020, Batz helped 1. Fc Saarbrücken to a victory over Bundesliga side Fortuna Düsseldorf by saving five penalties to make his team the first ever fourth-tier side to get into the DFB-Pokal semi-finals.

For the 2023-24 season Batz moved to Bundesliga club Mainz 05, joining the clubs´goalkeeping unit alongside Robin Zentner and Lasse Rieß. He made his league appearances for the club late in the first half of his campaign, standing in while Zentner was injured. He left Mainz in 2026 as a free agent after three consecutive years at the club.

On 18 May 2026, Batz signed a 3-year contract with Borussia Mönchengladbach.

== Career statistics ==
As of match played 31 October 2026

Appearances and goals by club, season and competition
Club	Season	League			DFB-Pokal		Europe		Other (Note: Includes Saarland Cup)		Total	
Club	Season	Division	Apps	Goals	Apps	Goals	Apps	Goals	Apps	Goals	Apps	Goals
Nürnberg II	2008–09	Regionalliga Süd	13	0	—		—		—		13	0
Nürnberg II	2009–10	Regionalliga Süd	13	0	—		—		—		13	0
Nürnberg II	2010–11	Regionalliga Süd	3	0	—		—		—		3	0
Nürnberg II	Total		29	0	—		—		—		29	0
Nürnberg	2010–11	Bundesliga	0	0	0	0	—		—		0	0
SC Freiburg II	2011–12	Regionalliga Süd	8	0	—		—		—		8	0
SC Freiburg II	2012–13	Regionalliga Südwest	13	0	—		—		—		13	0
SC Freiburg II	2013–14	Regionalliga Südwest	9	0	—		—		—		9	0
SC Freiburg II	2014–15	Regionalliga Südwest	5	0	—		—		—		5	0
SC Freiburg II	Total		35	0	—		—		—		35	0
SC Freiburg	2011–12	Bundesliga	1	0	0	0	—		—		1	0
SC Freiburg	2012–13	Bundesliga	0	0	0	0	—		—		0	0
SC Freiburg	2013–14	Bundesliga	0	0	0	0	0	0	—		0	0
SC Freiburg	2014–15	Bundesliga	0	0	0	0	—		—		0	0
SC Freiburg	Total		1	0	0	0	0	0	—		1	0
Chemnitzer FC	2015–16	3. Liga	2	0	0	0	—		—		2	0
SV Elversberg	2015–16	Regionalliga Südwest	16	0	0	0	—		—		16	0
SV Elversberg	2016–17	Regionalliga Südwest	36	0	0	0	—		—		36	0
SV Elversberg	Total		52	0	0	0	—		—		52	0
FC Saarbrücken	2017–18	Regionalliga Südwest	35	0	0	0	—		2 (Note: Appearances in promotion play-offs)	0	37	0
FC Saarbrücken	2018–19	Regionalliga Südwest	33	0	0	0	—		0	0	33	0
FC Saarbrücken	2019–20	Regionalliga Südwest	23	0	5	0	—		2 (Note: Appearances in Saarland Cup)	0	30	0
FC Saarbrücken	2020–21	3. Liga	38	0	0	0	—		2	0	40	0
FC Saarbrücken	2021–22	3. Liga	37	0	0	0	—		2	0	39	0
FC Saarbrücken	2022–23	3. Liga	38	0	0	0	—		—		38	0
FC Saarbrücken	Total		204	0	5	0	—		8	0	217	0
Mainz 05	2023–24	Bundesliga	4	0	0	0	—		—		4	0
Mainz 05	2024–25	Bundesliga	0	0	0	0	—		—		0	0
Mainz 05	2025–26	Bundesliga	21	0	0	0	5 (Note: Appearances in UEFA Conference League)	0	—		26	0
Mainz 05	Total		25	0	0	0	5	0	—		30	0
Borussia Mönchengladbach	2026–27	Bundesliga	1	0	1	0	—		—		2	0
Career total			316	0	6	0	5	0	8	0	335	0
