= Oliver Baumann =

German footballer (born 1990)

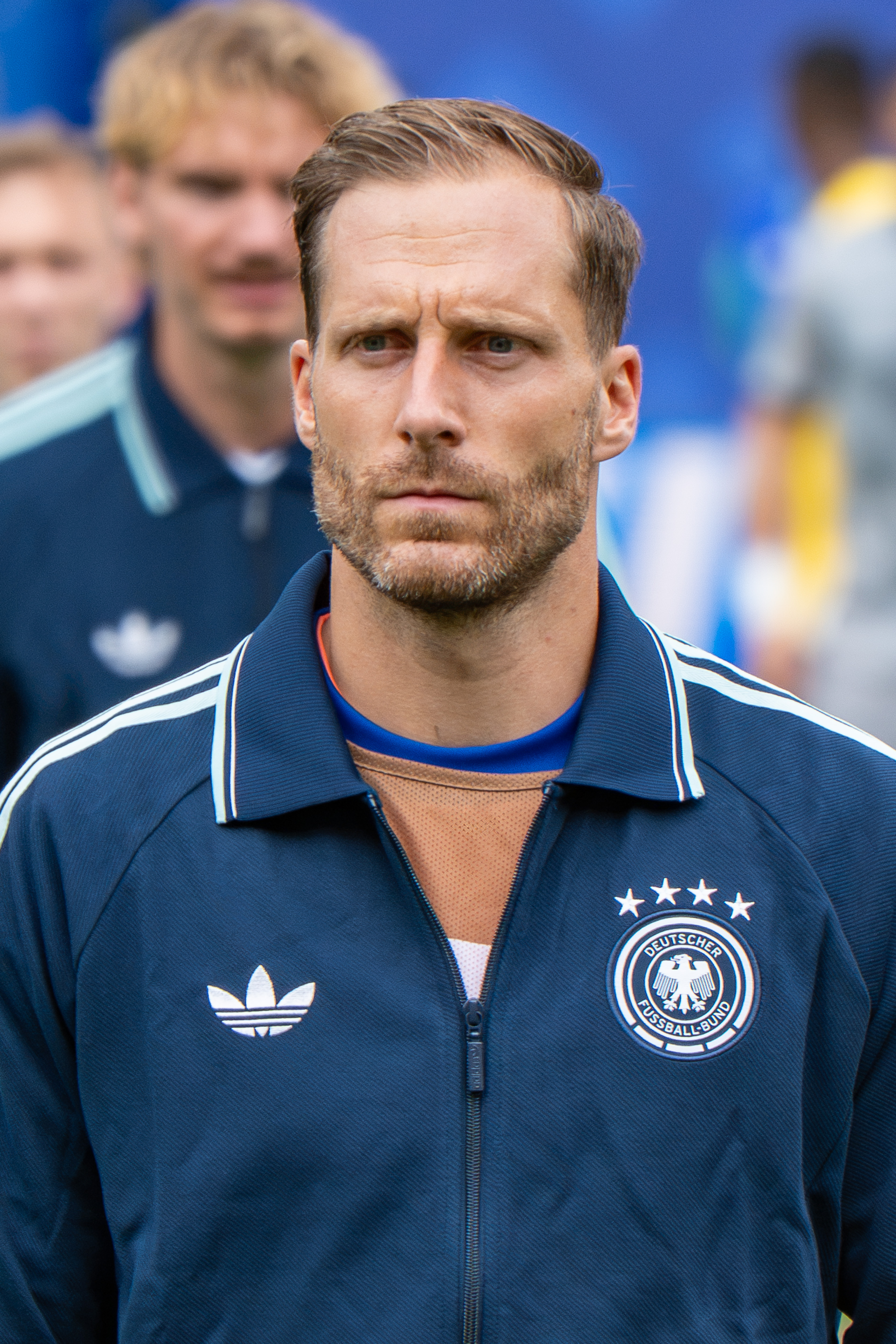
- Baumann with Germany in 2026

Personal information
- Date of birth: 2 June 1990 (age 36)
- Place of birth: Breisach, West Germany
- Height: 1.87 m (6 ft 2 in)
- Position: Goalkeeper

Team information
- Current team: TSG Hoffenheim
- Number: 1

Youth career
- FC Bad Krozingen
- 2002–2009: SC Freiburg

Senior career*
Years	Team	Apps	(Gls)
2009–2010	SC Freiburg II	22	(0)
2010–2014	SC Freiburg	131	(0)
2014–	TSG Hoffenheim	400	(0)

International career^{‡}
2008	Germany U18	1	(0)
2008–2009	Germany U19	7	(0)
2010	Germany U20	2	(0)
2010–2013	Germany U21	10	(0)
2024–	Germany	13	(0)
- * Club domestic league appearances and goals as of 31 October 2026 ‡ National team caps and goals as of 16:29, 6 June 2026 (UTC)

Oliver Baumann (German pronunciation: [ˈɔlivɐ ˈbaʊman]; born 2 June 1990) is a German professional footballer who plays as a goalkeeper for Bundesliga club TSG Hoffenheim, where he is also captain, and the Germany national team.

== Club career ==
=== SC Freiburg ===
==== Youth and B teams ====
Oliver Baumann joined SC Freiburg's youth team in 2002, since then he has gone on to make 104 Bundesliga appearances for the club. He went on to make 21 appearances for SC Freiburg.

==== First team ====
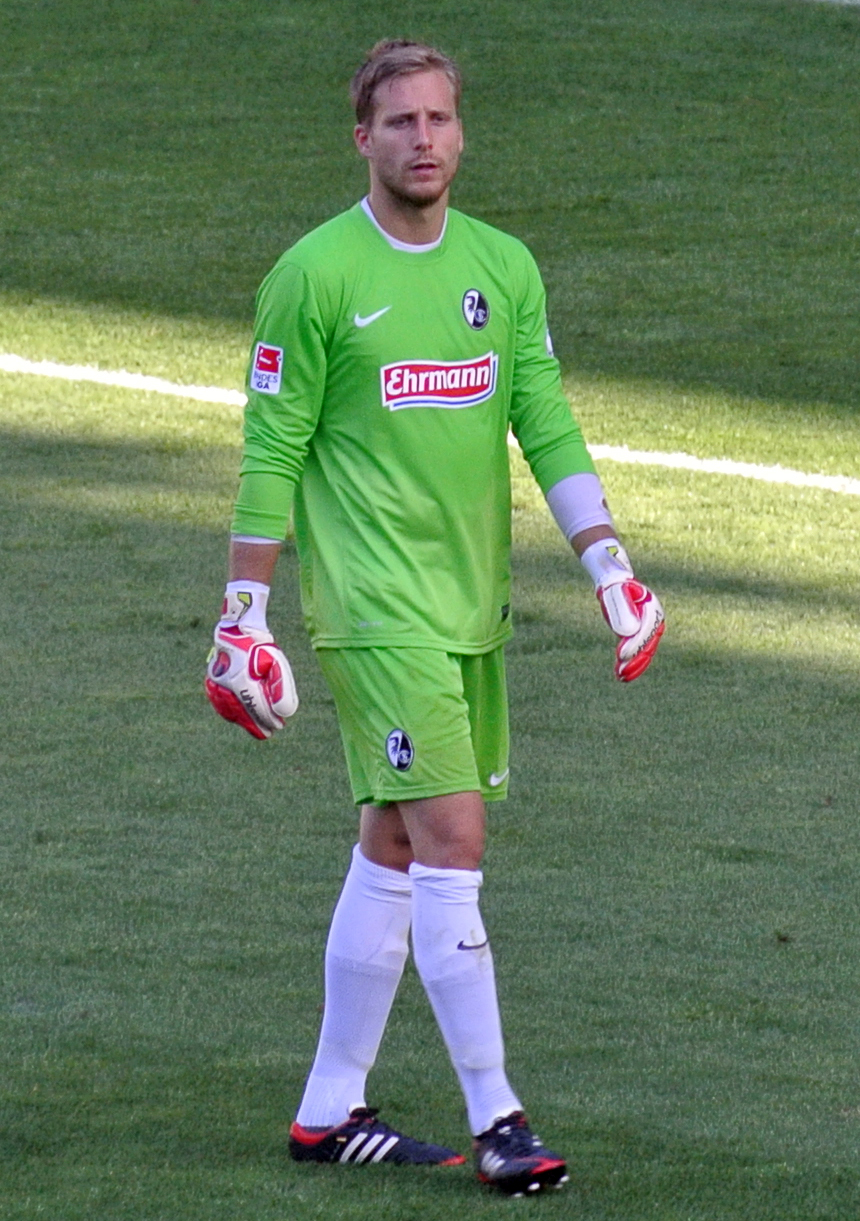
Baumann with Freiburg in 2013

On the last day of the 2009–10 Bundesliga season, Baumann made his senior team debut in a 3–1 home victory over Borussia Dortmund. He became the SC Freiburg first-choice goalkeeper from the 2010–11 season onwards, where he made 30 appearances in the Bundesliga. In June 2011, he extended his contract until 2015. In the following two seasons, 2011–12 and 2012–13, Baumann made a total of 73 appearances for the Freiburg first-team, 67 of those in the league.

In the 2013–14 season he continued to be the mainstay of the Freiburg line-up, starting all of the club's first six Bundesliga fixtures, as well as starting Freiburg's opening UEFA Europa League and DFB-Pokal matches. In a match against Hamburg SV, Baumann made three mistakes that led to a 3–0 loss to Hamburg SV. Despite this performance, he started the following game against Nürnberg and kept a clean sheet to help Freiburg achieve its first win of the 2013–14 season. On 24 September 2013, Baumann signed a new contract at the club.

=== TSG Hoffenheim ===
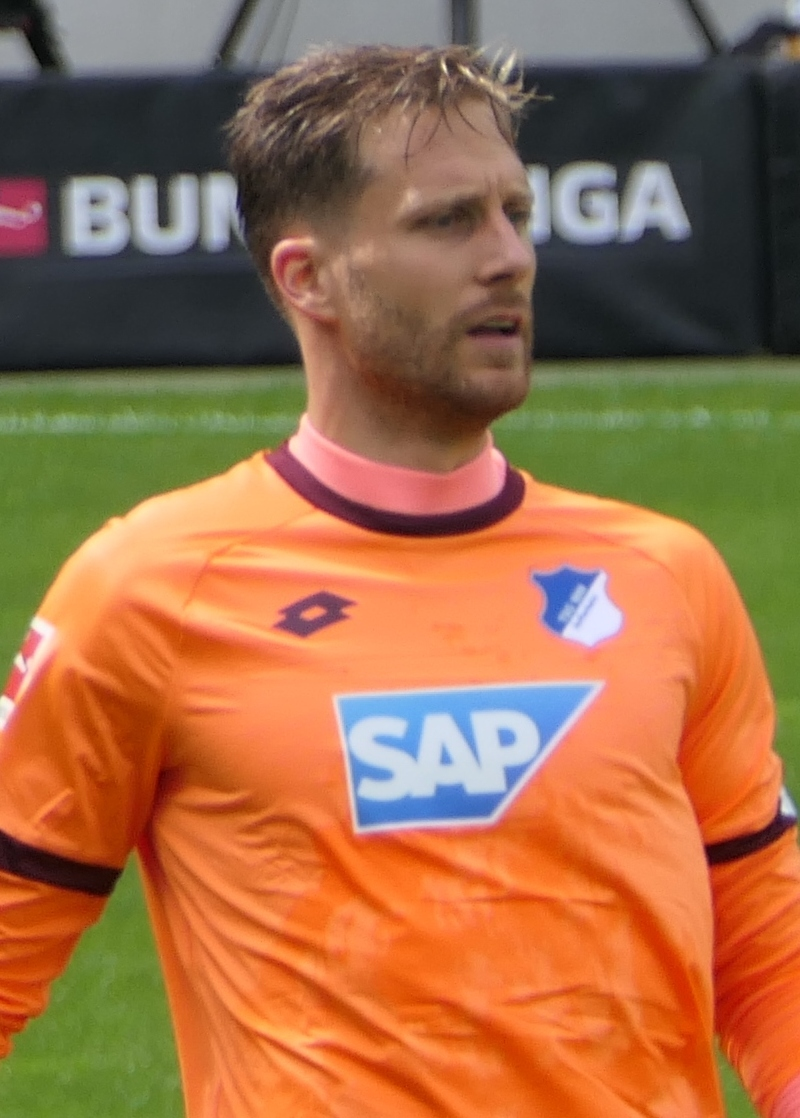
Baumann with TSG Hoffenheim in 2019

On 14 May 2014, Baumann joined TSG Hoffenheim on a four-year contract deal. He became Hoffenheim's starting goalkeeper ever since, and team captain in 2022 following the retirement of Benjamin Hübner. In the 2023–24 season, he achieved the most saves in Bundesliga in 157 occasions. In August 2025, he extended his contract with the club until 2026. On 21 November 2025, Baumann became the 14th player in Bundesliga history since 1963 to reach 500 appearances after starting against Mainz.

== International career ==
Baumann made at least one appearance for each of the nation's youth sides from under-18 to under-21 level. His only Germany under-18 appearance came in a 3–2 friendly defeat to the Republic of Ireland in 2007. Four of his seven under-19 matches were qualifiers for the 2009 European Under-19 Championships, but despite his two clean sheets in the elite round, Germany failed to progress.

After making two appearances for Germany's under-20 side, against Switzerland and Italy, he made the step up to under-21 level. He played once in qualifying for the 2011 European Championships, three times in 2013 qualifying, and once in the 2013 finals, as well as four friendlies.

Baumann was called up to Germany's squad for UEFA Nations League matches against Spain and Switzerland in September 2020, and named in the squad for UEFA Euro 2024 on home soil, but did not play. He finally made his senior debut on 14 October 2024, in the starting eleven for a 2024–25 UEFA Nations League A match against the Netherlands at the Allianz Arena, and kept a clean sheet in Germany's 1–0 victory. On 21 May 2026, he was selected in Germany's 26-man squad for the 2026 FIFA World Cup, where he didn't make an appearance for the entire duration of the tournament until Germany's defeat to Paraguay in the Round of 32.

== Career statistics ==
=== Club ===
As of match played 31 October 2026

Appearances and goals by club, season and competition
Club	Season	League			DFB-Pokal		Europe		Total	
Club	Season	Division	Apps	Goals	Apps	Goals	Apps	Goals	Apps	Goals
SC Freiburg II	2009–10	Regionalliga Süd	20	0	—		—		20	0
SC Freiburg II	2010–11	Regionalliga Süd	2	0	—		—		2	0
SC Freiburg II	Total		22	0	—		—		22	0
SC Freiburg	2009–10	Bundesliga	1	0	0	0	—		1	0
SC Freiburg	2010–11	Bundesliga	30	0	1	0	—		31	0
SC Freiburg	2011–12	Bundesliga	33	0	1	0	—		34	0
SC Freiburg	2012–13	Bundesliga	34	0	5	0	—		39	0
SC Freiburg	2013–14	Bundesliga	33	0	3	0	6 (Note: Appearance(s) in UEFA Europa League)	0	42	0
SC Freiburg	Total		131	0	10	0	6	0	147	0
TSG Hoffenheim	2014–15	Bundesliga	34	0	3	0	—		37	0
TSG Hoffenheim	2015–16	Bundesliga	33	0	1	0	—		34	0
TSG Hoffenheim	2016–17	Bundesliga	34	0	2	0	—		36	0
TSG Hoffenheim	2017–18	Bundesliga	34	0	0	0	7 (Note: Two appearances in UEFA Champions League, two appearances in UEFA Europa League)	0	41	0
TSG Hoffenheim	2018–19	Bundesliga	33	0	0	0	6 (Note: Appearance(s) in UEFA Champions League)	0	39	0
TSG Hoffenheim	2019–20	Bundesliga	30	0	1	0	—		31	0
TSG Hoffenheim	2020–21	Bundesliga	31	0	2	0	7	0	40	0
TSG Hoffenheim	2021–22	Bundesliga	33	0	2	0	—		35	0
TSG Hoffenheim	2022–23	Bundesliga	34	0	3	0	—		37	0
TSG Hoffenheim	2023–24	Bundesliga	34	0	2	0	—		36	0
TSG Hoffenheim	2024–25	Bundesliga	28	0	2	0	7	0	37	0
TSG Hoffenheim	2025–26	Bundesliga	34	0	2	0	—		36	0
TSG Hoffenheim	2026–27	Bundesliga	8	0	0	0	3	0	11	0
TSG Hoffenheim	Total		400	0	20	0	30	0	450	0
Career total			553	0	30	0	36	0	619	0

=== International ===
As of match played 6 June 2026

Appearances and goals by national team and year
National team	Year	Apps	Goals
Germany	2024	2	0
Germany	2025	8	0
Germany	2026	3	0
Total		13	0
