= Manuel Salz =

German professional football goalkeeper (born 1985)

Personal information
- Full name: Manuel Salz
- Date of birth: 6 August 1985 (age 41)
- Place of birth: Böblingen, West Germany
- Height: 1.85 m (6 ft 1 in)
- Position: Goalkeeper

Youth career
- 1999–2002: SV Hohenwart
- 2002–2003: VfR Pforzheim

Senior career*
Years	Team	Apps	(Gls)
2003–2008	Stuttgarter Kickers II	108	(0)
2008–2009	Stuttgarter Kickers	38	(0)
2009–2012	SC Freiburg II	16	(0)
2009–2012	SC Freiburg	3	(0)
2013	Rot-Weiß Erfurt	0	(0)
2013–2014	TSV Grunbach		
2014–2021	1. CfR Pforzheim		
- * Club domestic league appearances and goals

Manuel Salz (born 6 August 1985) is a German former professional footballer who played as a goalkeeper

== Career ==
Salz was born in Böblingen, Baden-Württemberg. He began his career with SV Hohenwart and signed than with VfR Pforzheim in 2002. In summer 2003, he left VfR Pforzheim and signed with Stuttgarter Kickers where he played for the reserve team. After fifty games with the reserve Oberliga Baden-Württemberg, he was promoted to the 3. Liga team.

On 22 April 2009, he announced his departure from Stuttgarter Kickers. On 29 May 2009, Salz signed a contract with SC Freiburg until 30 June 2011.

Salz retired from playing in summer 2021, leaving 1. CfR Pforzheim for which he had played since 2014.

== Personal life ==
His brother Dominik is also a footballer. They played together at 1. FC Pforzheim.
