= Andreas Munkert =

German footballer (1908–1982)

Personal information
- Date of birth: 7 March 1908
- Date of death: 23 April 1982 (aged 84)
- Position: Defender

Senior career*
Years	Team	Apps	(Gls)
1929–1938	1. FC Nürnberg		

International career
1935–1937	Germany	8	(0)
- * Club domestic league appearances and goals

Andreas Munkert (7 March 1908 – 23 April 1982) was a German international footballer. He was part of Germany's squad at the 1936 Summer Olympics, but he did not play in any matches.
