= Cédric Makiadi =

Congolese footballer (born 1984)

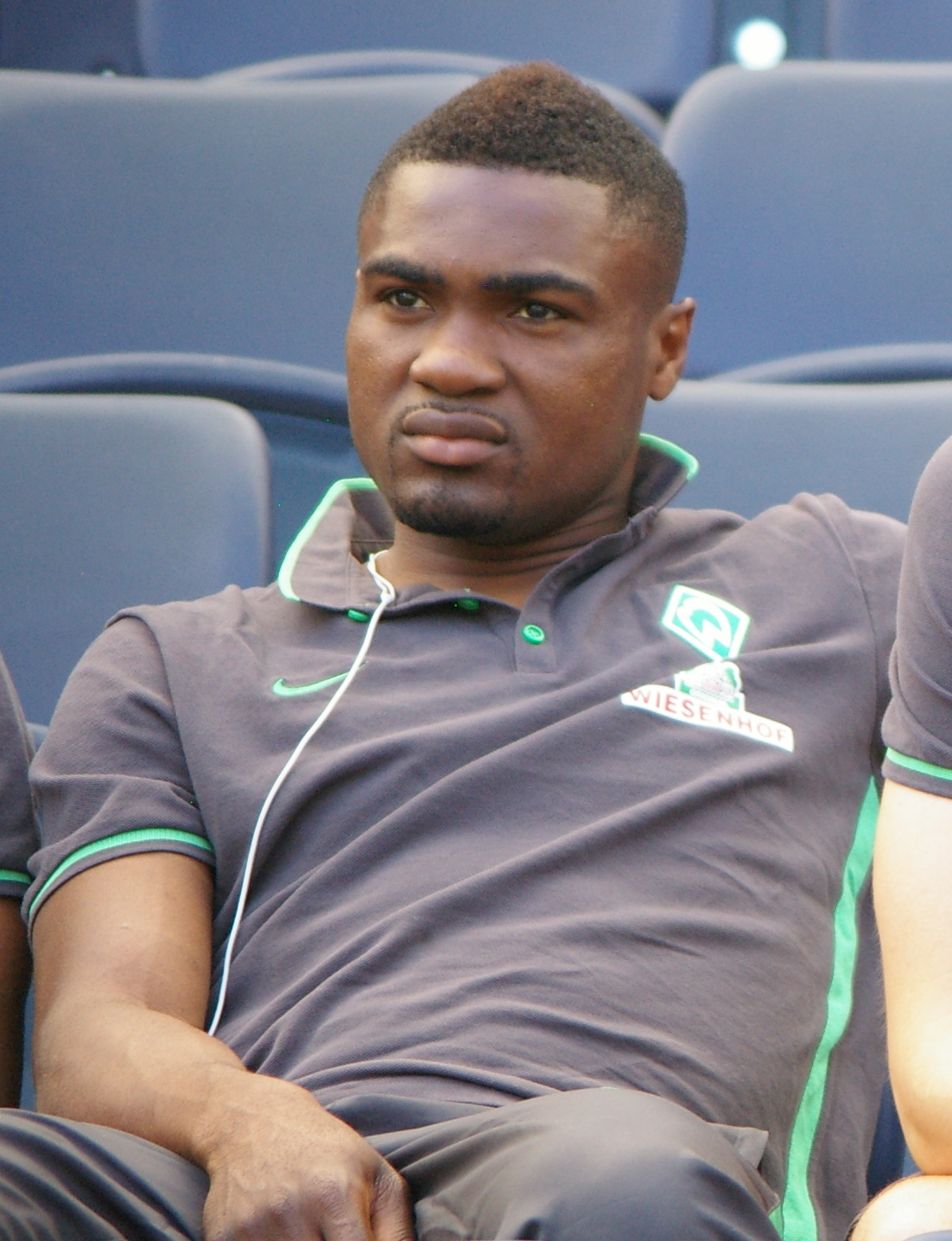
- Makiadi in 2015

Personal information
- Full name: Mapuata Cédric Makiadi
- Date of birth: 23 February 1984 (age 42)
- Place of birth: Kinshasa, Zaire
- Height: 1.77 m (5 ft 10 in)
- Position: Midfielder

Youth career
- 1998–2002: VfB Lübeck
- 2002–2004: VfL Wolfsburg

Senior career*
Years	Team	Apps	(Gls)
2004–2008	VfL Wolfsburg II	36	(8)
2004–2009	VfL Wolfsburg	48	(4)
2008–2009	→ MSV Duisburg (loan)	33	(16)
2009–2013	SC Freiburg	129	(12)
2013–2015	Werder Bremen	48	(1)
2015–2016	Çaykur Rizespor	20	(0)
Total		314	(41)

International career
2007–2016	DR Congo	22	(2)
- * Club domestic league appearances and goals

Mapuata Cédric Makiadi (born 23 February 1984) is a Congolese former professional footballer who played as a midfielder. Makiadi spent most of his career in Germany, playing senior football for VfL Wolfsburg, MSV Duisburg, SC Freiburg and Werder Bremen, and concluded his career spending one season at Turkish club Çaykur Rizespor. At international level, he earned 22 caps scoring two goals with the DR Congo national team.

== Early and personal life ==
Born in Kinshasa, Makiadi moved to Germany at the age of eight and also holds German citizenship. His father, Richard Mapuata N'Kiambi, and two brothers, Fabrice and Matondo, are also footballers.

== Club career ==
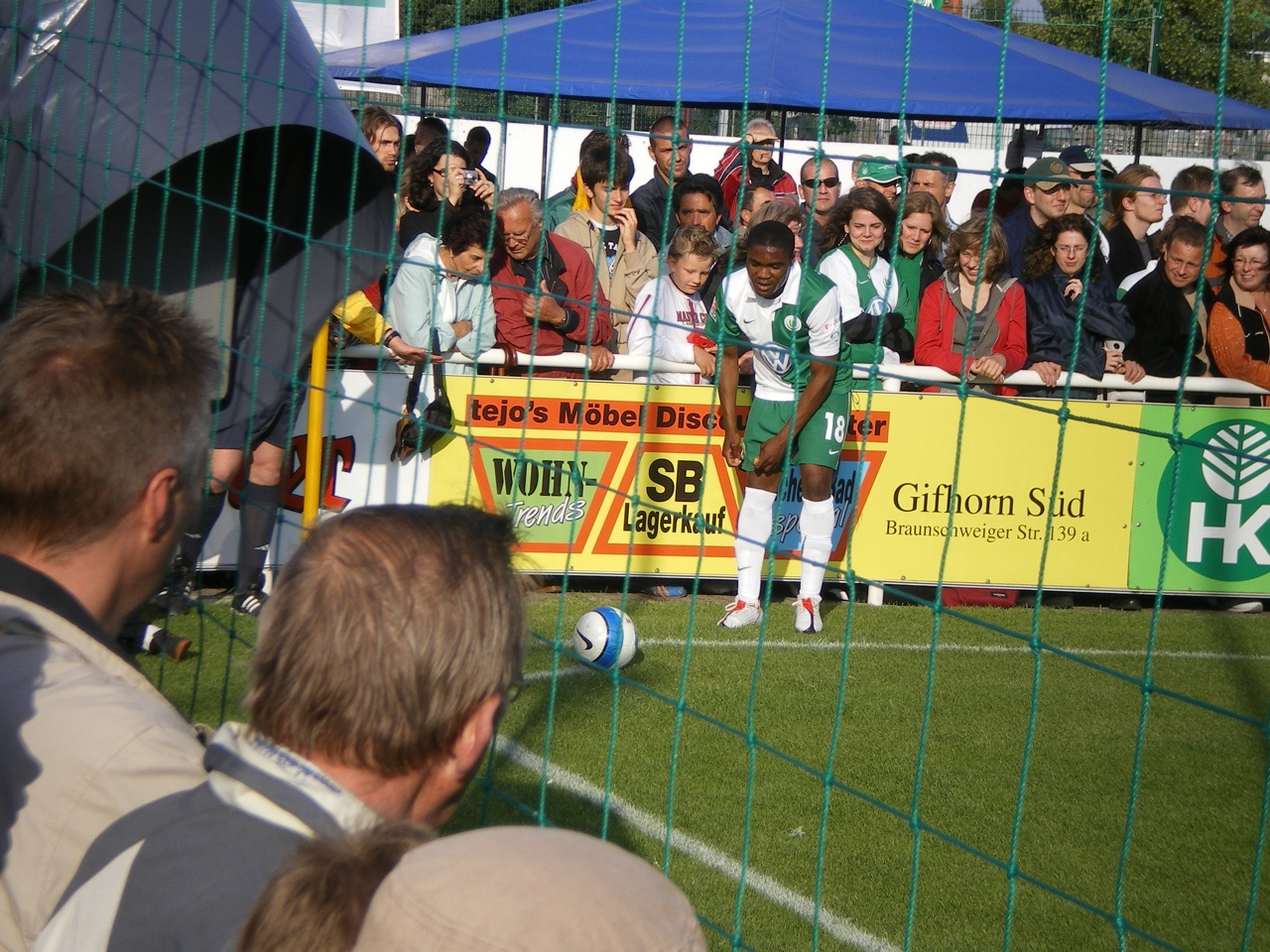
Makiadi taking a corner for VfL Wolfsburg II in 2007

In summer 2013, Makiadi joined Werder Bremen. On 27 August 2015, Werder Bremen announced Makiadi's departure for Çaykur Rizespor on a free transfer. He left the club at the end of the season before retiring.

== International career ==
Makiadi rejected a call up from the DR Congo national team for the 2006 Africa Cup of Nations, before declaring his national allegiance in February 2007. Makiadi made his international debut later that same year. In December 2014, he was named in the 29-man provisional squad for the 2015 Africa Cup of Nations.

=== International goals ===
Scores and results list DR Congo's goal tally first, score column indicates score after each Makiadi goal.

List of international goals scored by Cédric Makiadi
No.	Date	Venue	Opponent	Score	Result	Competition	Ref.
1	20 August 2008	Stade du Vieux-Pré, Dreux, France	Togo	1–1	2–1	Friendly	
2	12 August 2009	Jean-Leroi Municipal Stadium, Blois, France	Senegal	1–2	1–2	Friendly	

== Honours ==
DR Congo

- Africa Cup of Nations third place: 2015
