= Christian Streich =

German football player and manager

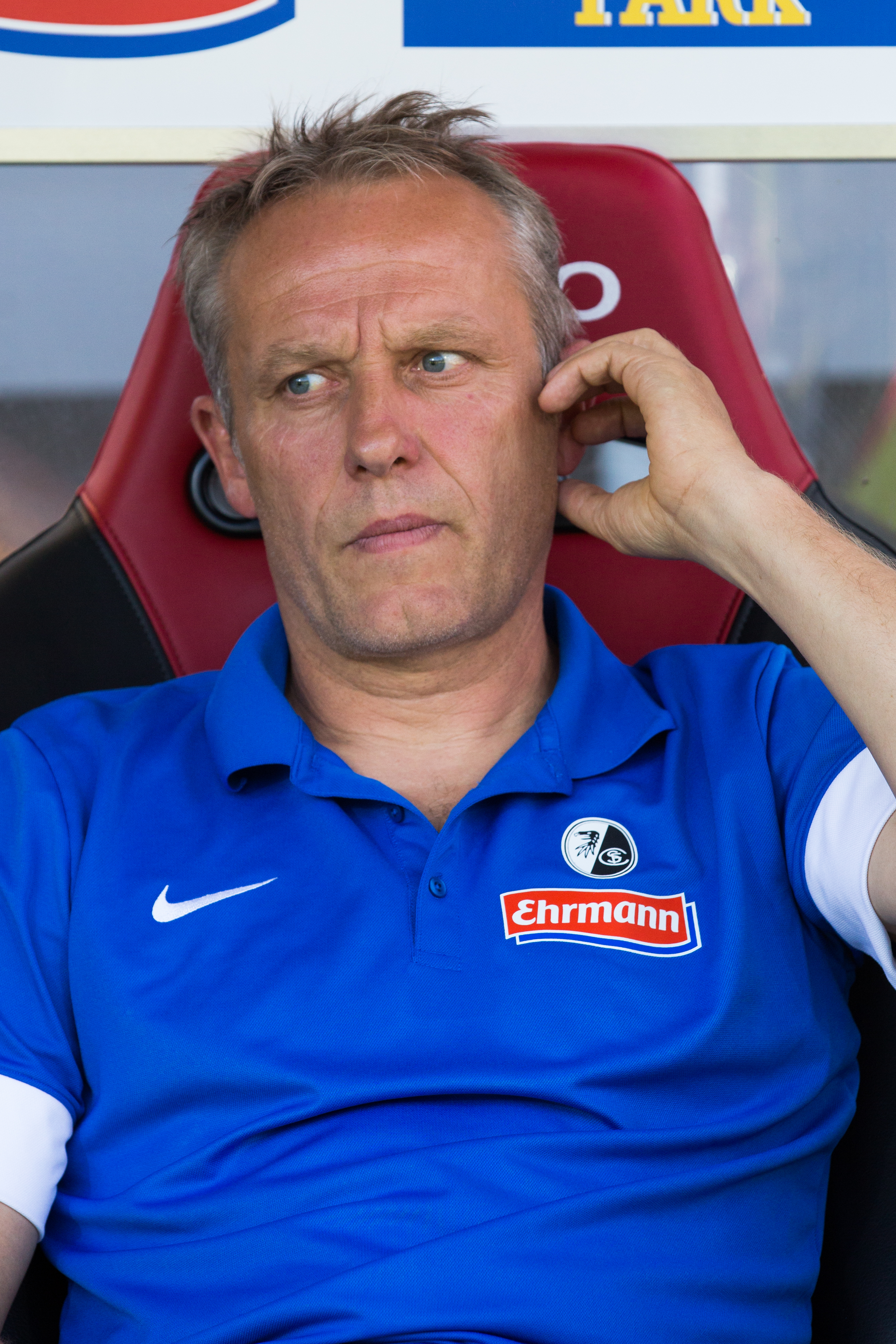
- Streich with SC Freiburg in 2013

Personal information
- Date of birth: 11 June 1965 (age 61)
- Place of birth: Weil am Rhein, West Germany
- Height: 1.81 m (5 ft 11 in)
- Position: Midfielder

Youth career
- SpVgg Märkt-Eimeldingen
- FV Lörrach

Senior career*
Years	Team	Apps	(Gls)
1983–1985	Freiburger FC	56	(8)
1985–1987	Stuttgarter Kickers	21	(2)
1987–1988	SC Freiburg	22	(2)
1988–1990	FC 08 Homburg	33	(1)
1991–1994	Freiburger FC	77	(27)
Total		209	(40)

Managerial career
- 2011–2024: SC Freiburg
- * Club domestic league appearances and goals

Christian Streich (German pronunciation: [ˈkʁɪsti̯a(ː)n ˈʃtʁaɪç]; born 11 June 1965) is a German professional football manager and former player who was the manager of Bundesliga club SC Freiburg from 2011 to 2024. Because of his immediate success at the club and his enigmatic and, oftentimes, energetic personality, Streich has been called a "cult figure", a "firebrand", and a "football philosopher". He was named German Manager of the Year in 2022.

== Playing career ==
=== Early career ===
Streich grew up in Eimeldingen, a village in Southern Baden. He began to play football at the local club. Later, he transferred to FV Lörrach, which was close to his hometown. Finally, he switched clubs and moved to Freiburg, where his new club would be Freiburger FC. Their first team had just been relegated from Germany’s second division. After one year in FFC’s academy, he was moved to their first team in 1983/1984. The team, at the time, was in Baden-Württemberg's second division. In his first season there, he won the league’s title, but ultimately lost to FC 08 Homburg and VfR Bürstadt in playoff matches for promotion.

=== Professional career (Bundesliga) ===
After a further season with FFC, Streich was transferred to the Stuttgarter Kickers in 1985. He left a little over a year later to play for SC Freiburg in the 2. Bundesliga.

After a season with SCF in which he made 22 appearances and scored 2 goals, Streich left the club and went to the second-division team FC 08 Homburg, with which he obtained the runner-up position and promotion into the top national league in 1989. In the 1989–90 season, Streich made ten appearances for Homburg. In 1991, Streich transferred back to Freiburger FC and played there until his playing career was cut short by a broken metatarsal in 1995.

== Managerial career ==
=== Early career ===
Streich returned to SC Freiburg in 1995 as a youth trainer. With the youth squad, he won the 2006, 2009, and 2011 junior DFB Cup and the Under 19 Fußball-Bundesliga championship in 2008. After Robin Dutt was named manager of the Freiburg's first team in the summer of 2007, Streich served as a co-trainer, attending mainly to the youth squad. Under his direction, many youth players made the leap to the pros including: Dennis Aogo, Jonathan Pitroipa, Daniel Schwaab, Eke Uzoma, Ömer Toprak, and Oliver Baumann.

=== Freiburg ===
At the beginning of the 2011–12 season, Streich became assistant coach of Freiburg's first team with the new trainer Marcus Sorg after Robin Dutt left the club to become head coach of Bayer Leverkusen. Following a poor first half of the Bundesliga season which saw Freiburg in the relegation zone, Streich became head coach on 29 December 2011 after Marcus Sorg was sacked.

Following the winter break, Freiburg played its first Bundesliga match under Christian Streich against fellow relegation battlers FC Augsburg. Freiburg won 1–0 off of an 88th-minute goal by Matthias Ginter, a player who trained under Streich at the youth levels at SCF and who was brought to the senior squad by Streich himself. The goal came off of a free-kick by the newly signed Danish defender Michael Lumb, another of Streich's own signings during his first transfer period with the club. With the victory, Streich became the first Freiburg manager to win their Bundesliga debut. Volker Finke lost his debut in 1991 while his immediate successors, Robin Dutt and Marcus Sorg, both drew in their debuts. The win also lifted Freiburg off of the bottom of the league table, passing Augsburg in the process. Despite being viewed as a club that would certainly be relegated before Streich took over, following an unbeaten streak of 9 matches, Freiburg secured their place in the Bundesliga for the upcoming season on matchday 32 with a 0–0 draw against Hannover 96. The team finished the season with a club record of a 10-match unbeaten streak before losing on the final matchday of the season to league champions Borussia Dortmund. Freiburg finished in 12th place. After the season, Streich was named Coach of the Year by Goal!, the official Bundesliga magazine.

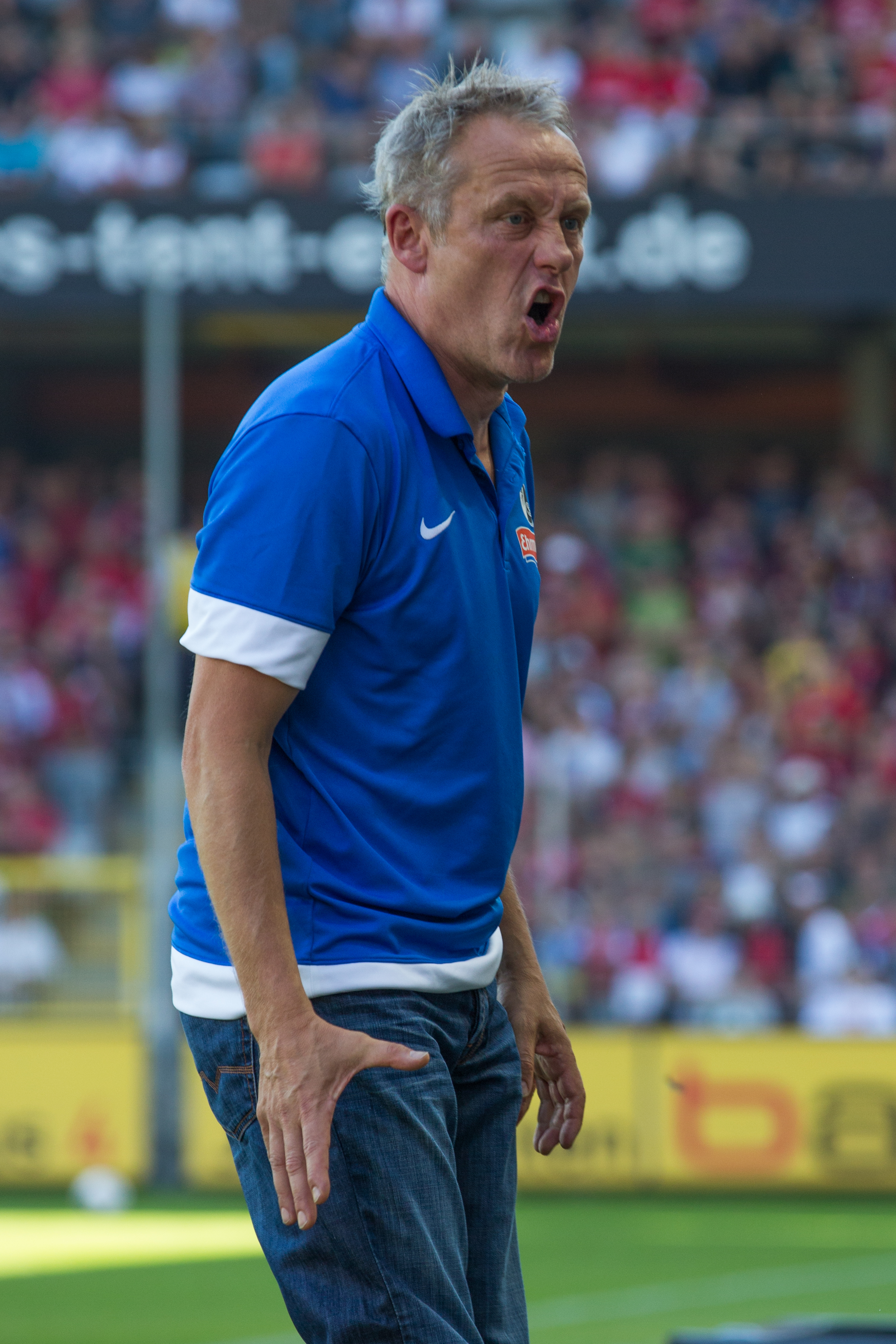
Streich coaching Freiburg in 2013

Under Streich, the 2012–13 season saw the club finish in fifth place, their best league standing since the 1994–95 season. The fifth-place finish secured a position in the 2013–14 UEFA Europa League, an accomplishment that the club had not achieved since the 2001–02 edition of the tournament. Had SC Freiburg defeated FC Schalke 04 on the final matchday of the season, Freiburg would have leapfrogged Schalke and qualified for the UEFA Champions League for the first time in the club's history. However, the 1–2 defeat to Schalke saw Schalke secure fourth place in the league and qualify for the tournament instead. During the 2012–13 season, Freiburg also advanced to the semi-finals of the DFB-Pokal for the first time in the club's history but lost to local rivals VFB Stuttgart 1–2 and missed the chance to play FC Bayern Munich in the final. Following the season, Streich was named Coach of the Season by Kicker magazine, beating out treble-winning Jupp Heynckes. Streich extended his contract at the end of the season.

The third season with Streich as coach started out very unsuccessful with Freiburg remaining 16th in the Bundesliga and were eliminated in the group stage of the Europa League after finishing in third place. SC Freiburg was eliminated in round 3 of the 2013–14 DFB-Pokal by Bayer Leverkusen, however finished the Bundesliga season as 14th and therefore remaining in the league.

Freiburg started the 2014–15 season with a 2–0 win against Eintracht Trier in the DFB-Pokal. However, with only five wins in the second half of the season, were not enough and the team finished 17th and therefore relegated to the 2. Bundesliga by a single point.

Freiburg started the following season with a 6–3 win against 1. FC Nürnberg, and was able eventually to win the 2. Bundesliga. All managerial contracts including Streich's originally expiring summer 2016 were extended in February 2016.

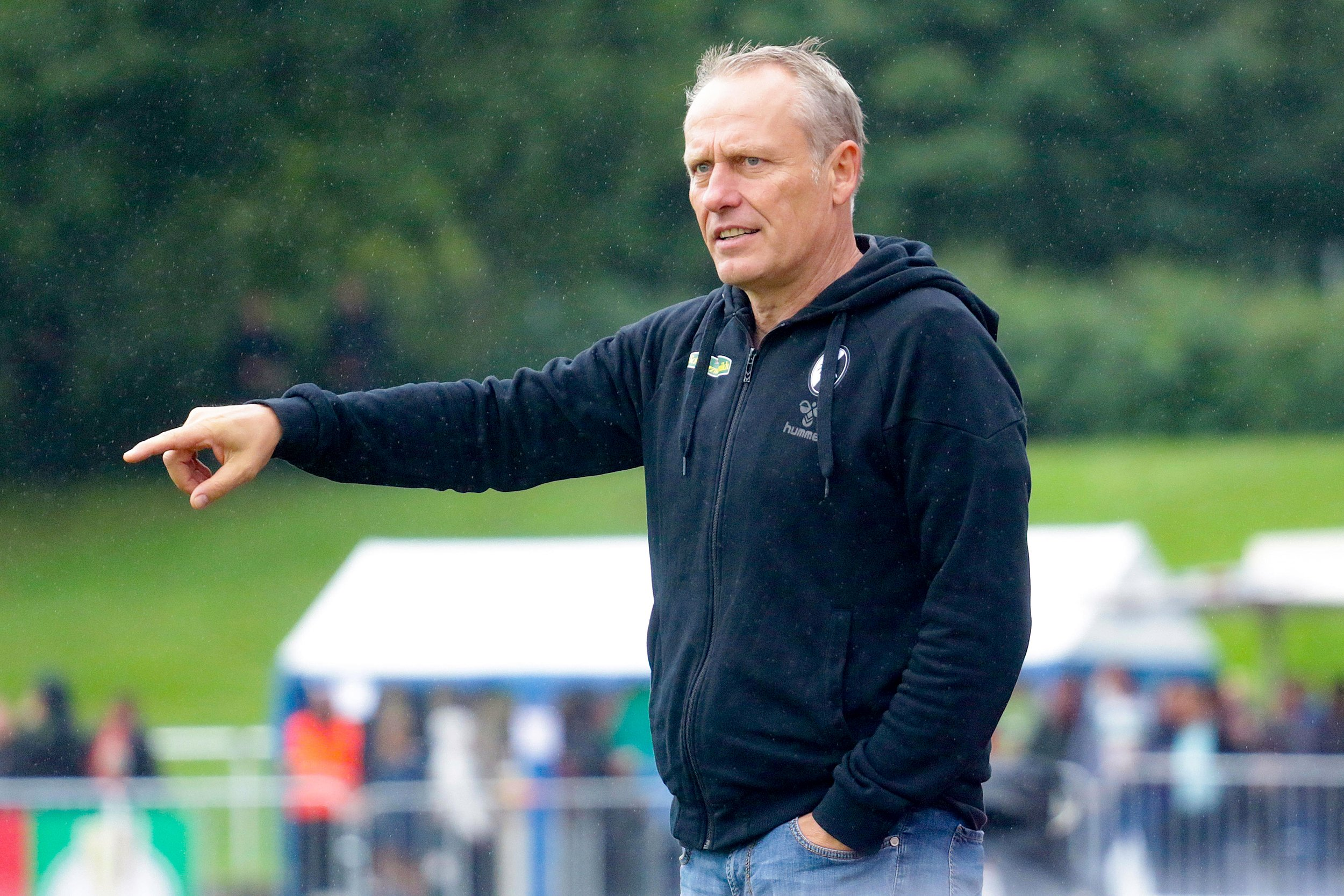
Streich coaching Freiburg in 2017

Freiburg started the 2016–17 season with a 4–0 win against SV Babelsberg 03 in the DFB-Pokal. The first season back in the Bundesliga saw them end seventh, which qualified them to the Europa League qualification rounds.

In the 2021–22 season, Freiburg finished sixth in the league, in order to qualify to another Europa League competition. In the following season, he led his club to finish fifth in the league, reach the Europa League knockout phase for the first time, and the semi-finals of the DFB-Pokal.

In March 2024, Streich announced that he would leave his position at Freiburg after 12 years by the end of the 2023–24 season.

== Personal life ==
Streich is the son of a butcher and grew up working in his father's shop. He attributes his welcoming personality to his parents and their nature towards customers at the shop. After the abrupt end of his playing career, Streich completed his studies in German, and also studied sport and history at university; he eventually became a qualified teacher.

Streich is known for his heavy southwestern German dialect and has been called a firebrand by many because of his energetic personality. He has two children and has described himself as "...just a normal guy, no tattoos, no piercings". Streich also cycles to the stadium on his bicycle for Freiburg's home matches, which is 12 kilometers from his neighbourhood.

== Managerial record ==
As of match played on 18 May 2024

Managerial record by team and tenure
Team	From	To	Record								Ref
Team	From	To	G	W	D	L	GF	GA	GD	Win %	Ref
SC Freiburg	29 December 2011	30 June 2024	490	194	128	168	714	714	+0	39.59	
Career total			490	194	128	168	714	714	+0	39.59	—

== Honours ==
=== Manager ===
SC Freiburg youth

- Junior DFB-Pokal: 2006, 2009, 2011
- Under 19 Bundesliga: 2008

SC Freiburg

- 2. Bundesliga: 2015–16

=== Individual ===
- Goal! Official Bundesliga Magazine Coach of the Year: 2011–12
- kicker Coach of the Year: 2012–13
- VDV Bundesliga Coach of the Season: 2021–22
- Football Manager of the Year (Germany): 2022
