= Julian Schuster =

German footballer (born 1985)

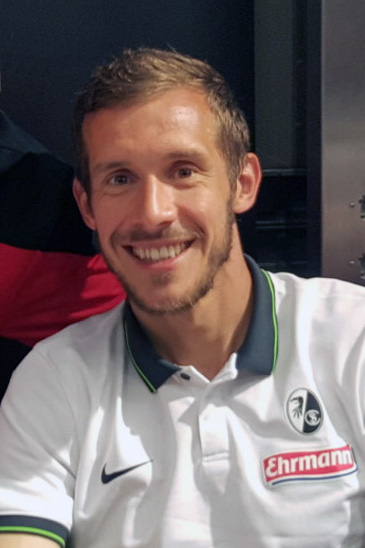
- Schuster with SC Freiburg in 2016

Personal information
- Date of birth: 15 April 1985 (age 41)
- Place of birth: Bietigheim-Bissingen, West Germany
- Height: 1.90 m (6 ft 3 in)
- Position: Midfielder

Team information
- Current team: SC Freiburg (head coach)

Youth career
- 1990–2004: FV Löchgau
- 2004–2005: VfB Stuttgart

Senior career*
Years	Team	Apps	(Gls)
2005–2008	VfB Stuttgart II	56	(3)
2007–2008	VfB Stuttgart	2	(0)
2008–2018	SC Freiburg II	8	(2)
2008–2018	SC Freiburg	219	(17)
Total		283	(22)

Managerial career
- 2024–: SC Freiburg
- * Club domestic league appearances and goals

Julian Schuster (born 15 April 1985) is a German football manager and former player who is the head coach of Bundesliga club SC Freiburg.

A midfielder, he spent the bulk of his playing career at SC Freiburg.

== Playing career ==
Schuster was born in Bietigheim-Bissingen, Baden-Württemberg. He had his professional debut on 27 October 2007 for VfB Stuttgart against Bayer Leverkusen.

In July 2008, he moved to SC Freiburg. On 18 February 2014, Schuster extended his contract for an undisclosed length. In May 2018, he announced his retirement.

== Managerial career ==
Following his retirement, Schuster transitioned into a liaison coach at SC Freiburg while concurrently serving as an assistant coach. In October 2022, alongside Patrick Baier, he stepped in for head coach Christian Streich, who tested positive for COVID-19, during the Europa League match against Nantes. In January 2023, he completed a course at the DFB to attain the Pro license, the pinnacle coaching accreditation in German football.

In March 2024, it was announced that Schuster would assume the position of head coach for SC Freiburg for the 2024–25 season, succeeding Streich. In his debut season, Schuster led the club to a fifth-place finish and Europa League qualification, narrowly missing out on the Champions League after a 3–1 home defeat against Eintracht Frankfurt on the final matchday. In the following season, he led the club to reach the Europa League final, their first ever in the competition which they lost to Aston Villa 3-0. However, he led the club to a second consecutive season in Europe, qualifying for the Conference League by finishing 7th in Bundesliga.

== Career statistics ==
Appearances and goals by club, season and competition
Club	Season	League			National cup		League cup		Continental		Other		Total	
Club	Season	Division	Apps	Goals	Apps	Goals	Apps	Goals	Apps	Goals	Apps	Goals	Apps	Goals
VfB Stuttgart II	2004–05	Regionalliga Süd	7	0	—		—		—		—		7	0
VfB Stuttgart II	2005–06	Regionalliga Süd	13	0	—		—		—		—		13	0
VfB Stuttgart II	2006–07	Regionalliga Süd	17	3	—		—		—		—		17	3
VfB Stuttgart II	2007–08	Regionalliga Süd	17	0	—		—		—		—		18	0
VfB Stuttgart II	Total		54	3	0	0	0	0	0	0	0	0	54	3
VfB Stuttgart	2007–08	Bundesliga	2	0	1	0	0	0	0	0	—		3	0
SC Freiburg II	2008–09	Regionalliga Süd	2	0	—		—		—		—		2	0
SC Freiburg II	2011–12	Regionalliga Süd	1	0	—		—		—		—		1	0
SC Freiburg II	2015–16	Regionalliga Südwest	5	2	—		—		—		—		5	2
SC Freiburg II	Total		8	2	0	0	0	0	0	0	0	0	8	2
SC Freiburg	2008–09	2. Bundesliga	26	6	2	0	—		—		—		28	6
SC Freiburg	2009–10	Bundesliga	28	2	1	0	—		—		—		29	2
SC Freiburg	2010–11	Bundesliga	26	3	2	0	—		—		—		28	3
SC Freiburg	2011–12	Bundesliga	21	1	1	0	—		—		—		22	1
SC Freiburg	2012–13	Bundesliga	31	1	5	0	—		—		—		36	1
SC Freiburg	2013–14	Bundesliga	27	3	2	0	—		2	1	—		32	4
SC Freiburg	2014–15	Bundesliga	21	0	3	1	—		—		—		24	1
SC Freiburg	2015–16	2. Bundesliga	8	1	2	1	—		—		—		10	2
SC Freiburg	2016–17	Bundesliga	13	0	1	0	—		—		—		14	0
SC Freiburg	2017–18	Bundesliga	18	0	2	1	—		—		—		20	1
SC Freiburg	Total		219	17	21	3	0	0	2	1	0	0	242	21
Career total			283	22	22	3	0	0	2	1	0	0	307	26

== Managerial statistics ==
As of match played 21 November 2026

Managerial record by team and tenure
Team	From	To	Record				
Team	From	To	G	W	D	L	Win %
SC Freiburg	1 July 2024	present	108	56	19	33	51.85
Total			108	56	19	33	51.85
