= Sebastian Freis =

German footballer

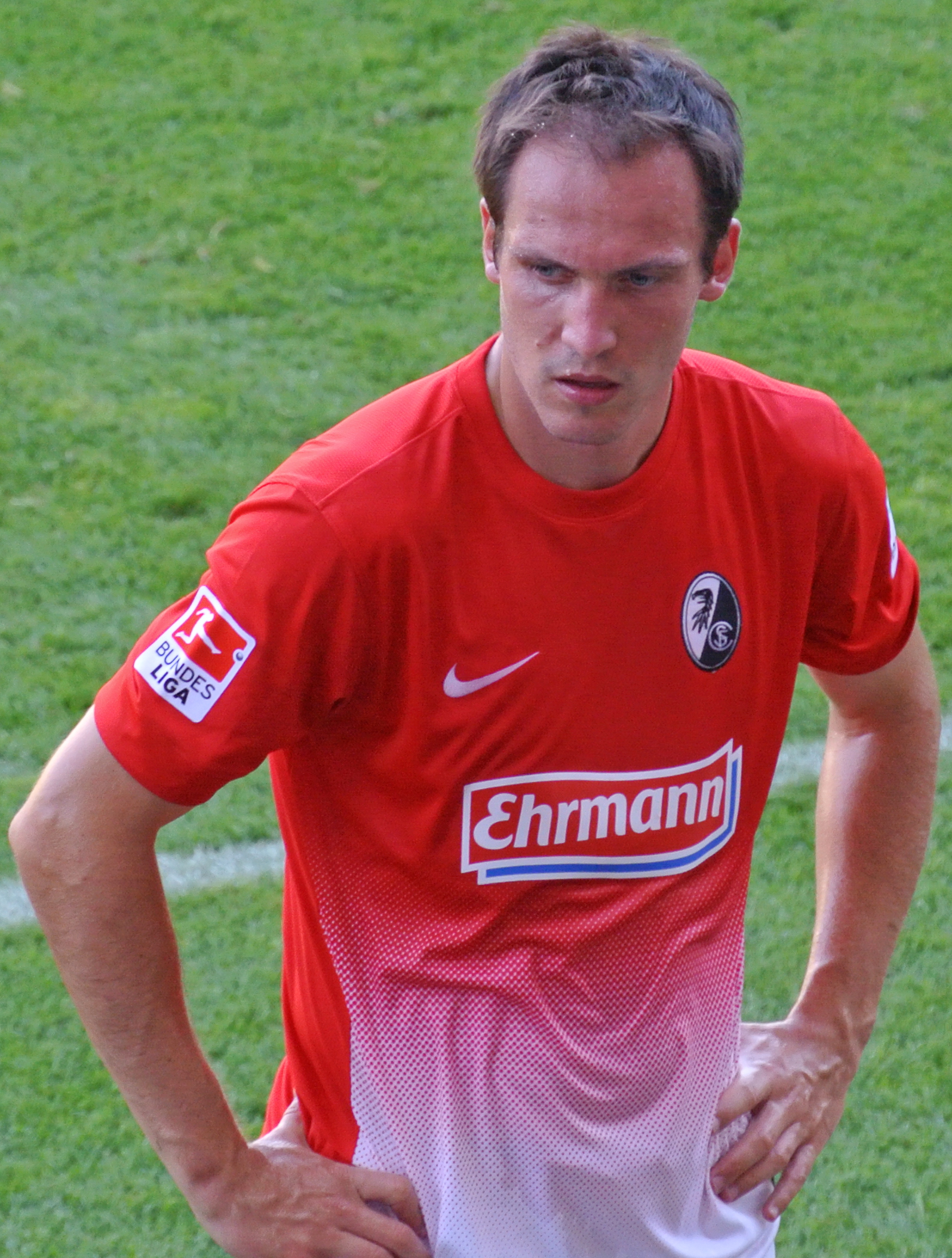
- Freis playing for SC Freiburg in 2013

Personal information
- Date of birth: 23 April 1985 (age 41)
- Place of birth: Karlsruhe, West Germany
- Height: 1.83 m (6 ft 0 in)
- Position: Striker

Youth career
- SC Wettersbach
- 1999–2004: Karlsruher SC

Senior career*
Years	Team	Apps	(Gls)
2004–2006	Karlsruher SC II	26	(13)
2004–2009	Karlsruher SC	143	(39)
2009–2012	1. FC Köln	48	(4)
2012–2015	SC Freiburg	51	(6)
2015–2017	Greuther Fürth	62	(16)
2017–2019	Jahn Regensburg	9	(0)
Total		339	(74)

International career
2004–2005	Germany U20	6	(3)
2006	Germany U21	1	(0)
- * Club domestic league appearances and goals

Sebastian Freis (born 23 April 1985) is a German former professional footballer who played as striker.

== Club career ==
Before joining Karlsruher SC in 1999, Freis played as a youth member for SC Wettersbach. His debut for Karlsruhe came on 15 October 2004, in a 2. Bundesliga match against Rot-Weiss Essen where Freis immediately scored a hat-trick. Altogether he made 78 appearances and 22 goals in the 2. Bundesliga and played an important role in the 2006–07 season, when Karlsruhe gained promotion to the Bundesliga. In July 2009, he moved to 1. FC Köln.

In January 2015, he moved to 2. Bundesliga club Greuther Fürth on a free transfer, signing a contract until 2017. At the end of the 2016–17 season, he was released.

In August 2017, Freis joined 2. Bundesliga side Jahn Regensburg as a free agent, agreeing to a two-year contract. In 2019, when his contract ran out, he decided end his career.

== International career ==
On 10 October 2006, he made his Germany U21 national team debut when the team lost 2–0 against England.

== Career statistics ==
Appearances and goals by club, season and competition
Club	Season	League			Cup		League Cup		Continental		Total	
Club	Season	Division	Apps	Goals	Apps	Goals	Apps	Goals	Apps	Goals	Apps	Goals
Karlsruher SC	2004–05	2. Bundesliga	23	8	0	0	0	0	–		23	8
Karlsruher SC	2005–06	2. Bundesliga	26	7	0	0	0	0	–		26	7
Karlsruher SC	2006–07	2. Bundesliga	29	7	2	0	0	0	–		31	7
Karlsruher SC	2007–08	Bundesliga	31	8	2	1	1	0	–		34	9
Karlsruher SC	2008–09	Bundesliga	34	9	3	1	0	0	–		37	10
Karlsruher SC	Total		143	39	7	2	1	0	0	0	151	41
1. FC Köln	2009–10	Bundesliga	31	3	4	1	0	0	–		35	4
1. FC Köln	2010–11	Bundesliga	13	1	1	0	0	0	–		14	1
1. FC Köln	2011–12	Bundesliga	4	0	1	0	0	0	–		5	0
1. FC Köln	Total		48	4	6	1	0	0	0	0	54	5
SC Freiburg	2011–12	Bundesliga	15	3	1	0	0	0	–		16	3
SC Freiburg	2012–13	Bundesliga	12	1	2	1	0	0	–		14	2
SC Freiburg	2013–14	Bundesliga	17	2	2	0	0	0	4	0	23	2
SC Freiburg	2014–15	Bundesliga	7	0	2	1	0	0	–		9	1
SC Freiburg	Total		51	6	7	2	0	0	4	0	62	8
Greuther Fürth	2014–15	2. Bundesliga	14	1	0	0	–		–		14	1
Greuther Fürth	2015–16	2. Bundesliga	30	12	1	0	–		–		31	12
Greuther Fürth	2016–17	2. Bundesliga	18	3	2	0	–		–		21	0
Greuther Fürth	Total		62	16	3	0	0	0	0	0	65	16
Jahn Regensburg	2017–18	2. Bundesliga	5	0	1	0	–		–		6	0
Jahn Regensburg	2018–19	2. Bundesliga	4	0	0	0	–		–		4	0
Jahn Regensburg	Total		9	0	1	0	0	0	0	0	10	0
Career total			313	65	24	5	1	0	4	0	342	70
