= Marcus Sorg =

German football manager and former player

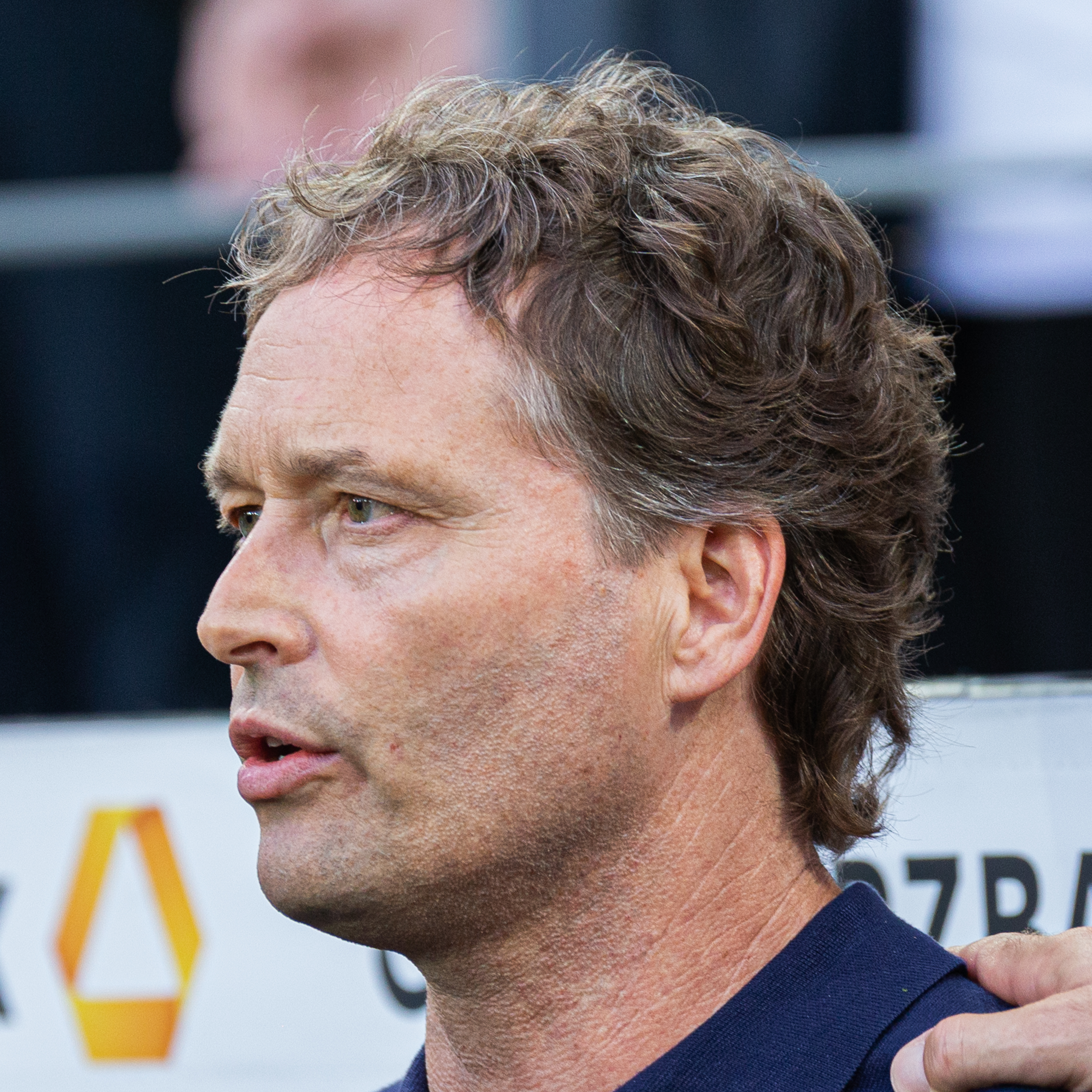
- Sorg in 2019

Personal information
- Date of birth: 24 December 1965 (age 60)
- Place of birth: Ulm, West Germany
- Height: 1.84 m (6 ft 0 in)
- Position: Striker

Team information
- Current team: Barcelona (assistant coach)

Youth career
- 1971–1977: TSG Söflingen
- 1977–1984: SSV Ulm

Senior career*
Years	Team	Apps	(Gls)
1984–1987	SSV Ulm	63	(16)
1987–1993	VfB Stuttgart Amateure		
1993–1996	TSF Ditzingen	91	(31)
1996–1997	VfR Mannheim	32	(11)
1997–1999	TSF Ditzingen	47	(14)
Total		233	(72)

Managerial career
- 1999–2001: Stuttgarter Kickers II
- 1999–2001: Stuttgarter Kickers (assistant)
- 2001–2003: Stuttgarter Kickers
- 2004: TSF Ditzingen
- 2004: Heidenheimer SB
- 2004–2007: SSV Ulm
- 2008: SC Freiburg U17
- 2009–2011: SC Freiburg II
- 2011: SC Freiburg
- 2012–2013: Bayern Munich U17
- 2013–2016: Germany U19
- 2016–2023: Germany (assistant)
- 2024–: Barcelona (assistant)
- * Club domestic league appearances and goals

Marcus Sorg (born 24 December 1965) is a German football coach and former player who is currently the assistant coach of La Liga club Barcelona.

== Career ==
=== Early career ===
Sorg has been head coach of lower division clubs including Stuttgarter Kickers II, Stuttgarter Kickers 1. FC Heidenheim, and SSV Ulm.

=== SC Freiburg ===
Sorg took over for Robin Dutt as head coach of Bundesliga side SC Freiburg when Dutt left for Bayer Leverkusen and had his first practice on 20 June 2011. On 29 December 2011, Sorg was sacked due to lack of results.

=== Germany national team ===
Between 2013 and 2016, Sorg was the head coach of the Germany national under-19 team, winning the 2014 UEFA European Under-19 Championship while in charge of the side.

On 18 March 2016, he joined the Germany senior national team as second assistant coach to Joachim Löw, and following the 2018 FIFA World Cup was promoted to first assistant. He remained in his position with coach Hansi Flick, until they were dismissed on 10 September 2023.

=== FC Barcelona ===
In May 2024, Sorg rejoined Hansi Flick as an assistant coach at Barcelona.
