= SC Freiburg =

Association football club in Germany

- Full name: Sport-Club Freiburg e.V.
- Nickname: Breisgau-Brasilianer (Breisgau Brazilians)
- Founded: 30 May 1904; 122 years ago
- Ground: Europa-Park Stadion
- Capacity: 34,700
- Board of directors: Oliver Leki (Finance, Organization & Marketing); Jochen Saier (Sporting CEO)
- Head coach: Julian Schuster
- League: Bundesliga
- 2025–26: Bundesliga, 7th of 18
- Website: scfreiburg.com
Home colours	Away colours	Third colours

Sport-Club Freiburg e.V., commonly known as SC Freiburg (German pronunciation: [ʔɛs ˈtseː ˈfʁaɪbʊɐ̯k]), is a German professional football club, based in the city of Freiburg im Breisgau, Baden-Württemberg. It plays in the Bundesliga, the top tier of the German football league system, having achieved promotion from the 2. Bundesliga in the 2015–16 season.

Between 1954 and 2021, Freiburg's stadium was the Dreisamstadion; the club moved to the newly built Europa-Park Stadion in 2021.

== History ==
=== Early history ===
The club traces its origins to a pair of clubs founded in 1904: Freiburger Fußballverein 04 was organised in March of that year; FC Schwalbe Freiburg just two months later. Both clubs underwent name changes, with Schwalbe becoming FC Mars in 1905, Mars becoming Union Freiburg in 1906, and FV 04 Freiburg becoming Sportverein Freiburg 04 in 1909. Three years later, SV and Union formed Sportclub Freiburg, at the same time incorporating the griffin head.

In 1918, after World War I, SC Freiburg entered a temporary arrangement with Freiburger FC to be able to field a full side called KSG Freiburg. The next year, SC Freiburg associated themselves with FT 1844 Freiburg as that club's football department, until 1928 when they left to enter into a stadium-sharing arrangement with PSV (Polizeisportverein) Freiburg 1924 that lasted until 1930 and the failure of PSV. SC Freiburg then started again with FT 1844 Freiburg in 1938. The club played first in the Bezirksliga Baden in 1928, then in the Gauliga Baden, from which they were relegated in 1934.

At the end of World War II, Allied occupation authorities disbanded most existing organizations in Germany, including football and sports clubs. The clubs reconstituted themselves after about a year, but were required to take on new names in an attempt to disassociate them from Nazis. SC Freiburg was therefore briefly known as VfL Freiburg. By 1950, French-occupation authorities allowed the clubs to reclaim their old identities. Finally, in 1952, SC Freiburg left FT Freiburg behind again.

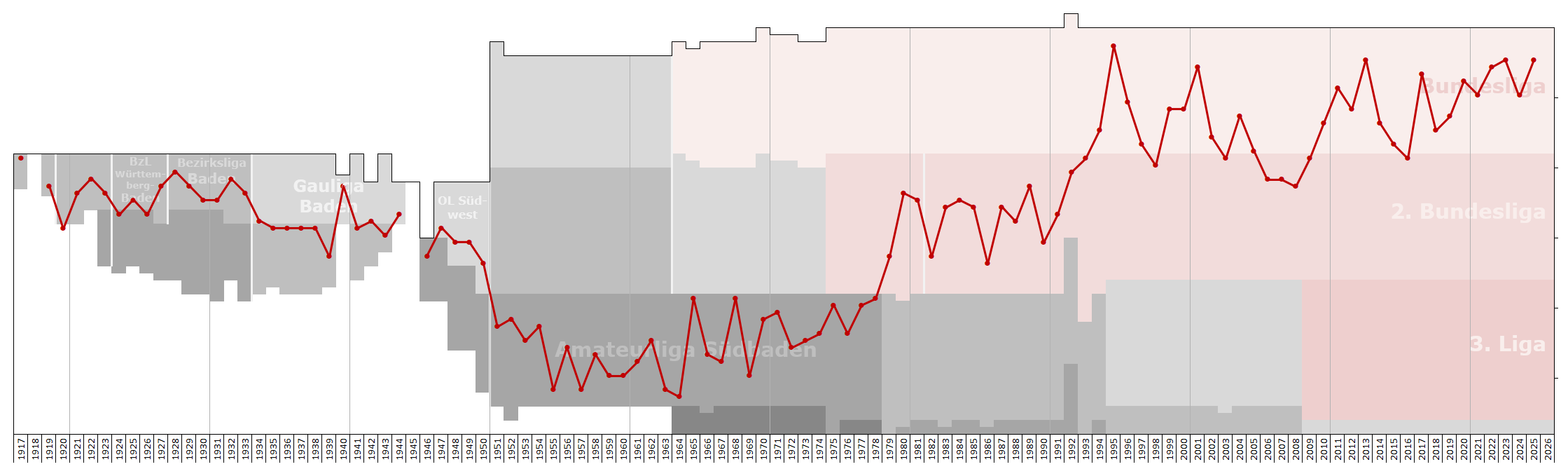
Historical chart of Freiburg league performance

Through the 1930s, SC Freiburg played in the Bezirkliga (II), in the Gauliga Baden (I), winning local titles. After World War II, they resumed playing in the Amateurliga Südbaden (III).

=== The Finke era with ten Bundesliga seasons (1991–2007) ===
SC Freiburg were promoted to the 2. Bundesliga in 1978–79, which they would compete in for a decade-and-a-half before making the breakthrough to the top-flight Bundesliga in 1993–94 under the management of Volker Finke. In their first Bundesliga season, Freiburg narrowly avoided relegation. They made a third-place finish in their second season at the top level, just three points behind champions Borussia Dortmund. It was at this time that they were first nicknamed Breisgau-Brasilianer (literally Breisgau-Brazilians), due to their attractive style of play.

The club reached the UEFA Cup in 1995, where they were knocked out in the first round by Slavia Prague. In 2001 they reached the UEFA Cup for a second time, where they were knocked out by Feyenoord.

Freiburg's first Bundesliga relegation was in 1997 after they finished in 17th position. While they have been relegated four times since first making the Bundesliga, they have thrice won immediate promotion back to the top league. It was the first time since 1992 that Freiburg played in the 2. Bundesliga for two consecutive seasons.

Freiburg finished the 2006–07 season in fourth place in the 2. Bundesliga, missing out on the third automatic-promotion spot on goal difference to MSV Duisburg, although they won 12 of their last 16 league games. They were knocked out of the DFB-Pokal in the second round by VfL Wolfsburg on 24 October 2006.

On 20 May 2007, Volker Finke resigned as the club's coach after 16 years in the job. He was succeeded by Robin Dutt, who himself left the club for Bayer Leverkusen in 2011.

On 10 May 2009, Freiburg secured promotion into the Bundesliga once again, beating TuS Koblenz in an away game 5–2.

=== Streich era ===
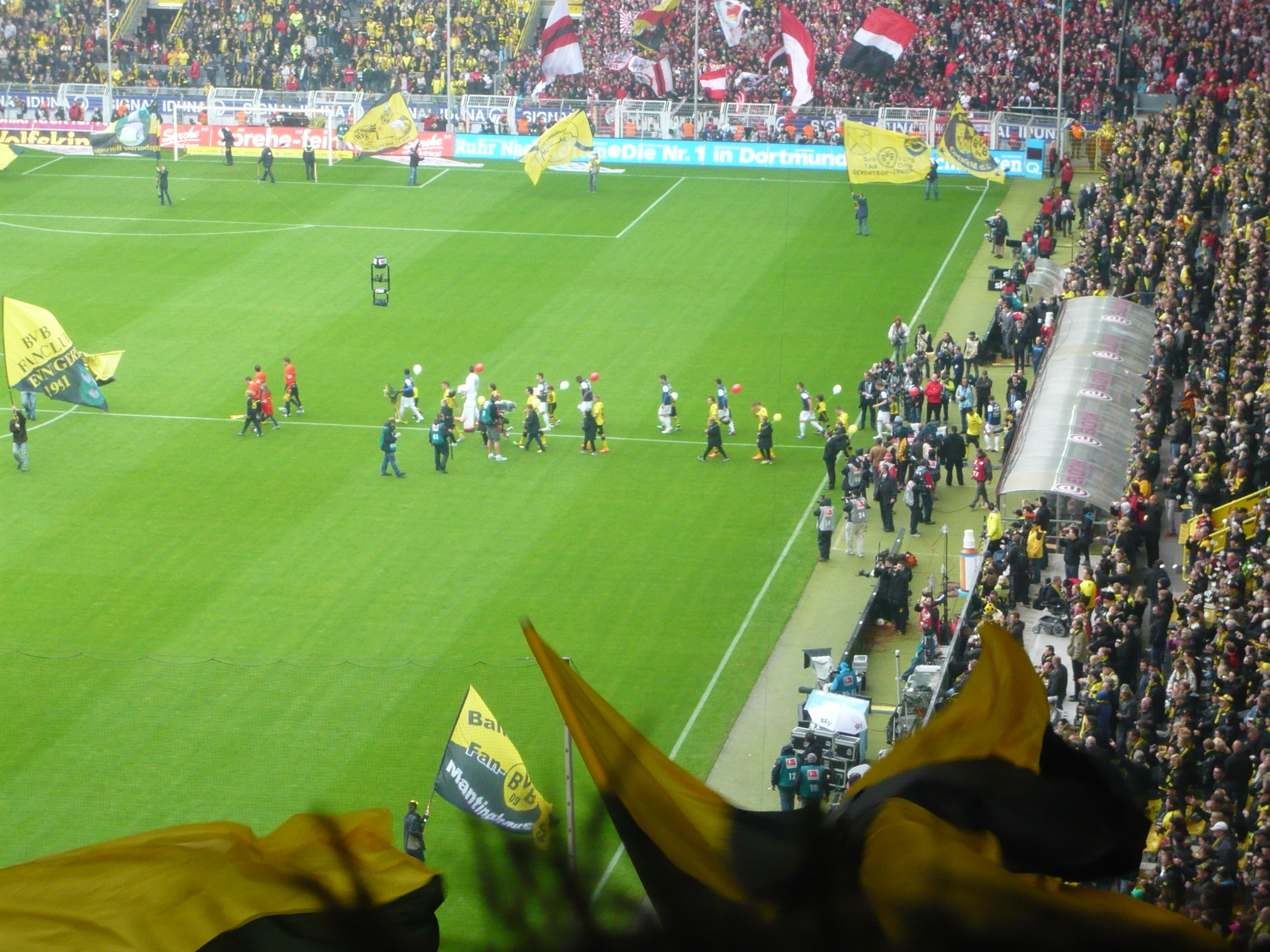
SC Freiburg against Borussia Dortmund in 2012

In the 2011–12 season, a coaching change by appointing Christian Streich, with the club finishing 12th. Under Christian Streich, the 2012–13 Bundesliga season saw the club finish in fifth place, their best league standing since 1994–95. The fifth-place finish secured a position in the 2013–14 UEFA Europa League. Had Freiburg defeated Schalke 04 on the final matchday of the season, Freiburg would have advanced further in the league table against Schalke and qualified for the UEFA Champions League for the first time in club history. The 1–2 defeat to Schalke, however, saw Schalke secure fourth place in the league and qualify for the tournament instead. During the 2012–13 season, Freiburg also advanced to the semi-finals of the DFB-Pokal for the first time in the club's history, but lost to local rivals VfB Stuttgart 1–2, and missed the chance to play Bayern Munich in the final.

In the 2014–15 season, after six years in the top flight, Freiburg was relegated to the 2. Bundesliga by a single point after a final-day defeat at Hannover 96. This was despite beating Bayern Munich in the second-last game. In the following season, however, the club earned its fifth promotion to the Bundesliga, with two matches to spare. The first season back in the Bundesliga saw them end seventh. This saw Freiburg qualify for the Europa League, as German cupwinners Borussia Dortmund were already qualified for the Champions League. The side were eliminated in the third qualification round against NK Domžale from Slovenia. Freiburg stayed in the top flight, finishing 15th.

In the 2021–22 season Freiburg reached the final of the DFB-Pokal for the first time. In the league Freiburg finished sixth to qualify to the next season's Europa League, where they reached the round of 16. In the following season, they finished fifth in the league to achieve another direct qualification to the Europa League group stage, despite being in the Champions League spots most of the season; however, two consecutive losses against rivals RB Leipzig and Union Berlin had them drop down in the league table with two games remaining. In the DFB-Pokal of the same season, defeated Bayern Munich 2–1 in the quarter-finals, in an away match for the first time in their history, before losing in the semi-finals at home 1–5 to RB Leipzig.

=== Post-Streich years ===
In March 2024, it was announced that Streich's assistant coach, Julian Schuster, would take over as head coach of the club. During the 2024–25 season, Freiburg reached the Champions League spots, climbing to fourth place after a crucial away win against Wolfsburg on matchday 31. However, a 3–1 home defeat to Eintracht Frankfurt on the final matchday saw them drop to fifth place and Europa League qualification, narrowly missing out on the Champions League for the fifth time following 2001, 2013, 2022, and 2023. In Schuster's second season, the club reached the Europa League final, the first European final in the club's history. In the final in Istanbul, they however lost 3-0 to English Aston Villa.

== Reserve team ==
The club's reserve team, formerly the SC Freiburg Amateure, now SC Freiburg II, has, for the most part of its history played in the lower amateur leagues. It made a three-season appearance in the tier four Verbandsliga Südbaden from 1983 to 1986, but then took until 1994 to return to this league. In 1998 the team won promotion to the Oberliga Baden-Württemberg after a league championship in the Verbandsliga. Freiburg II spent the next ten seasons at this level as an upper table side before another league championship took the team to the Regionalliga Süd. After four seasons at this league the team became part of the new Regionalliga Südwest in 2012. After a seventh place in its first season in the league the team finished runner-up in 2013–14.

A South Baden Cup win in 2001 qualified it for the first round of the 2001–02 DFB-Pokal, the German Cup, where it lost to Schalke 04.

== Stadium ==
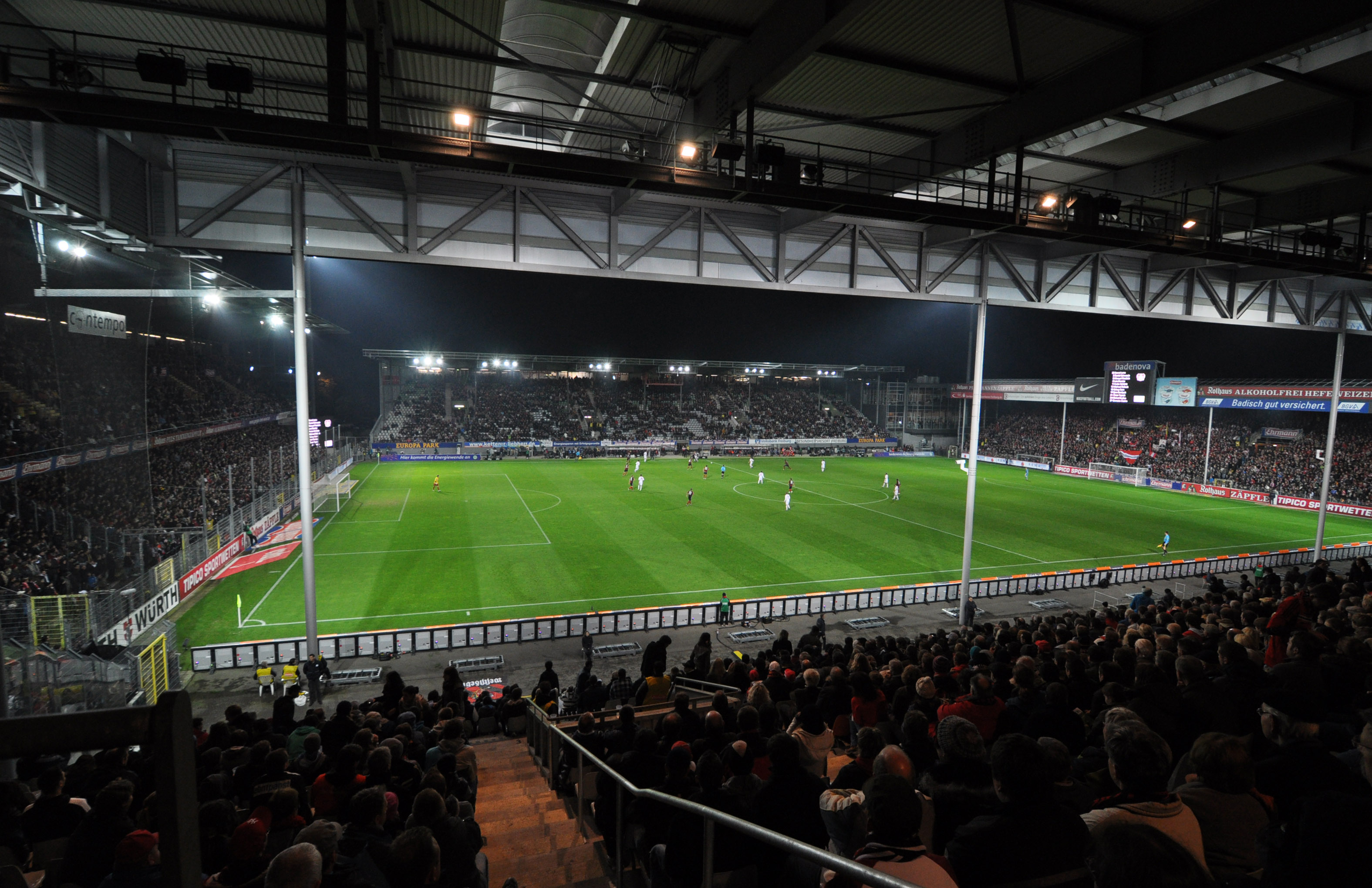
Dreisamstadion interior in 2011

SC Freiburg formerly played its home games at the Dreisamstadion, named after the Dreisam River which flows through Freiburg. Because of sponsorship agreements, the stadium was known as the Schwarzwald-Stadion. The stadium has an approximate capacity of 24,000 spectators, and was built in 1953. Forty years later, then manager Volker Finke began an initiative to transform the Dreisamstadion into Germany's first solar powered football stadium. There are solar modules on the north, south, and main tribunes. These panels generate 250,000 kWh of energy per year.

The new Europa-Park Stadion designed by HPP Architekten, was completed in October 2021. Located in the west of the city in a part of the city called Brühl — immediately to the west of Freiburg Airport — it has a capacity of 34,700.

== Sponsorship ==
In April 2022, the team announced their sponsorship with car retailer Cazoo starting in July 2022. The Cazoo brand is visible on the front of the new jerseys as the team's main sponsor. In addition to the Bundesliga professionals, Cazoo appeared as shirt sponsor and advertising partner of the second team of SC Freiburg in the third division and as co-sponsor of the Freiburg Football School, and became visible at all matches of the SC junior teams. Cazoo also became a co-sponsor and sleeve sponsor of SC Freiburg's Bundesliga women.

== UEFA competitions ==
=== Matches ===
As of 5 November 2026

Season	Competition	Round	Opponent	Home	Away	Aggregate
1995–96	UEFA Cup	First round	(Czech Republic) Slavia Prague	1–2	0–0	1–2
2001–02	UEFA Cup	First round	(Slovakia) Matador Púchov	2–1	0–0	2–1
2001–02	UEFA Cup	Second round	(Switzerland) St. Gallen	0–1	4–1	4–2
2001–02	UEFA Cup	Third round	(Netherlands) Feyenoord	2–2	0–1	2–3
2013–14	UEFA Europa League	Group H	(Spain) Sevilla	0–2	0–2	3rd
2013–14	UEFA Europa League	Group H	(Portugal) Estoril	1–1	0–0	3rd
2013–14	UEFA Europa League	Group H	(Czech Republic) Slovan Liberec	2–2	2–1	3rd
2017–18	UEFA Europa League	Third qualifying round	(Slovenia) Domžale	1–0	0–2	1–2
2022–23	UEFA Europa League	Group G	(Azerbaijan) Qarabağ	2–1	1–1	1st
2022–23	UEFA Europa League	Group G	(Greece) Olympiacos	1–1	3–0	1st
2022–23	UEFA Europa League	Group G	(France) Nantes	2–0	4–0	1st
2022–23	UEFA Europa League	Round of 16	(Italy) Juventus	0–2	0–1	0–3
2023–24	UEFA Europa League	Group A	(Greece) Olympiacos	5–0	3–2	2nd
2023–24	UEFA Europa League	Group A	(England) West Ham United	1–2	0–2	2nd
2023–24	UEFA Europa League	Group A	(Serbia) TSC	5–0	3–1	2nd
2023–24	UEFA Europa League	Knockout round play-offs	(France) Lens	3–2 (a.e.t.)	0–0	3–2
2023–24	UEFA Europa League	Round of 16	(England) West Ham United	1–0	0–5	1–5
2025–26	UEFA Europa League	League phase	(Switzerland) Basel	2–1	—N/a	7th
2025–26	UEFA Europa League	League phase	(Italy) Bologna	—N/a	1–1	7th
2025–26	UEFA Europa League	League phase	(Netherlands) Utrecht	2–0	—N/a	7th
2025–26	UEFA Europa League	League phase	(France) Nice	—N/a	3–1	7th
2025–26	UEFA Europa League	League phase	(Czech Republic) Viktoria Plzeň	—N/a	0–0	7th
2025–26	UEFA Europa League	League phase	(Austria) Red Bull Salzburg	1–0	—N/a	7th
2025–26	UEFA Europa League	League phase	(Israel) Maccabi Tel Aviv	1–0	—N/a	7th
2025–26	UEFA Europa League	League phase	(France) Lille	—N/a	0–1	7th
2025–26	UEFA Europa League	Round of 16	(Belgium) Genk	5–1	0–1	5–2
2025–26	UEFA Europa League	Quarter-finals	(Spain) Celta Vigo	3–0	3–1	6–1
2025–26	UEFA Europa League	Semi-finals	(Portugal) Braga	3–1	1–2	4–3
2025–26	UEFA Europa League	Final	(England) Aston Villa	0–3 (N)		
2026–27	UEFA Conference League	Play-off round	(Scotland) Motherwell	4–1	3–1	7–2
2026–27	UEFA Conference League	League phase	(Czech Republic) Jablonec	3–2	—N/a	
2026–27	UEFA Conference League	League phase	(France) Monaco	—N/a	0–3	
2026–27	UEFA Conference League	League phase	(Turkey) Trabzonspor	—N/a	1–0	
2026–27	UEFA Conference League	League phase	(Netherlands) Twente	Nov. 26	—N/a	
2026–27	UEFA Conference League	League phase	(Greece) Panathinaikos	Dec. 10	—N/a	
2026–27	UEFA Conference League	League phase	(Lithuania) Kauno Žalgiris	—N/a	Dec. 17	

=== Overall record ===
As of 5 November 2026

Competition	Pld	W	D	L	GF	GA	GD	Win %
UEFA Cup / UEFA Europa League	49	23	11	15	74	51	+23	46.94
UEFA Conference League	5	4	0	1	11	9	+2	80.00
Total	54	27	11	16	85	58	+27	50.00

=== Club records in UEFA competitions ===
As of 5 November 2026

- Biggest win in UEFA competition:
  - 9 November 2023, Freiburg 5–0 TSC, at Freiburg
  - 30 November 2023, Freiburg 5–0 Olympiacos, at Freiburg
- Biggest defeat in UEFA competition:
  - 14 March 2024, West Ham United 5–0 Freiburg, at London
- Club appearances in UEFA Europa League: 7
- Player with most UEFA appearances: Matthias Ginter – 42 appearances
- Top scorer in UEFA club competitions: Vincenzo Grifo – 12 goals

== Club records ==
Statistics correct as of 8 May 2026.

- Most 1. Bundesliga goals scored: 72 – Vincenzo Grifo 8 May 2026
- Highest transfer fee paid: €10 million for Baptiste Santamaria
- Highest transfer fee received: €60million for Johan Manzambi
- Youngest goalscorer: Matthias Ginter – 18 years, 2 days
- Player who has scored the most against club: Claudio Pizarro – 14 goals in 17 matches
- Biggest home win: 6–0 – against Rot-Weiß Erfurt on 24 August 1991
- Biggest 1. Bundesliga home win: 5–0 – against Hansa Rostock on 17 September 1999, against VfL Bochum on 9 December 2000 and against SV Werder Bremen on 21 February 2025
- Biggest away win: 6–0 – against Borussia Mönchengladbach on 5 December 2021
- Biggest 1. Bundesliga away win: 6–0 – against Borussia Mönchengladbach on 5 December 2021
- Biggest home loss: 0–6 – against Bayern Munich on 16 December 2003 and against Werder Bremen on 4 December 2004 and 21 November 2009
- Biggest 1. Bundesliga home loss: 0–6 – against Bayern Munich on 16 December 2003 and against Werder Bremen on 4 December 2004 and 21 November 2009
- Biggest away loss: 0–7 – against Bayern Munich on 10 September 2011
- Biggest 1. Bundesliga away loss: 0–7 – against Bayern Munich on 10 September 2011

== Honours ==
=== League ===
- 2. Bundesliga (II)
  - Winners: 1992–93, 2002–03, 2008–09, 2015–16
- Regionalliga Südwest (IV)
  - Winners: 2020–21^{‡}
- Oberliga Baden-Württemberg (V)
  - Winners: 2008^{‡}, 2017^{‡}
- Amateurliga Südbaden (III)
  - Winners: 1965, 1968, 1978
- Verbandsliga Südbaden (V)
  - Winners: 1998^{‡}

=== Cup ===
- South Baden Cup (Tiers III–VII)
  - Winners: 1975, 1978, 2001^{‡}
  - Runners-up: 2005^{‡}
- DFB-Pokal
  - Runners-up: 2021–22
- Bahía de Cartagena Trophy
  - Winners: 1995

=== International ===
- UEFA Europa League
  - Runners-up: 2025–26

=== Youth ===
League

- German Under 19 championship
  - Winners: 2008
- Under 19 Bundesliga South/Southwest
  - Winners: 2005–06, 2008–09

Cup

- German Under-19 Cup
  - Winners: 2006, 2009, 2011, 2012, 2018

=== Under-21 International ===
- Lev Yashin Cup
  - Winners: 2011

^{‡} Won by reserve team.

== Players ==
=== Current squad ===
As of 1 September 2026

Note: Flags indicate national team as defined under FIFA eligibility rules; some limited exceptions apply. Players may hold more than one non-FIFA nationality.

No.	Pos.	Nation	Player
1	GK	GER	Mio Backhaus
3	DF	AUT	Philipp Lienhart
5	DF	GER	Anthony Jung
6	MF	GER	Patrick Osterhage
7	FW	GER	Derry Scherhant
8	MF	GER	Maximilian Eggestein
9	FW	GER	Lucas Höler
14	MF	JPN	Yuito Suzuki
16	MF	GER	Yannik Engelhardt
17	DF	GER	Lukas Kübler
19	MF	GER	Niklas Beste
20	MF	JPN	Rihito Yamamoto
21	GK	GER	Florian Müller
22	FW	BFA	Cyriaque Irié

No.	Pos.	Nation	Player
23	MF	KOS	Florent Muslija
24	GK	GER	Jannik Huth
27	DF	TUR	Berkay Yılmaz
28	DF	GER	Matthias Ginter
29	DF	GER	Philipp Treu
30	DF	GER	Christian Günter (captain)
31	FW	CRO	Igor Matanović
32	MF	ITA	Vincenzo Grifo (vice-captain)
33	DF	COD	Jordy Makengo
37	DF	GER	Max Rosenfelder
39	MF	SUI	Rouven Tarnutzer
42	FW	JPN	Keisuke Gotō
43	DF	SUI	Bruno Ogbus

=== Out on loan ===
Note: Flags indicate national team as defined under FIFA eligibility rules; some limited exceptions apply. Players may hold more than one non-FIFA nationality.

No.	Pos.	Nation	Player
—	GK	GER	Noah Atubolu (at Eintracht Frankfurt until 30 June 2027)
—	DF	GER	Karl Steinmann (at Hannover 96 until 30 June 2027)

No.	Pos.	Nation	Player
—	FW	GER	Louey Ben Farhat (at Karlsruher SC until 30 June 2027)
—	MF	TUR	Eren Dinkçi (at Werder Bremen until 30 June 2027)

== Selected notable former players ==
This list of former players includes those who received international caps while playing for the team, made significant contributions to the team in terms of appearances or goals while playing for the team, or who made significant contributions to the sport either before they played for the team, or after they left. It is not complete or all inclusive, and additions and refinements will continue to be made over time.

- (Albania) Altin Rraklli
- (Argentina) Rodolfo Esteban Cardoso
- (Austria) Andreas Ibertsberger
- (Bosnia and Herzegovina) Zlatan Bajramović
- (Cameroon) Mohammadou Idrissou
- (Republic of the Congo) Rolf-Christel Guié-Mien
- (Costa Rica) Austin Berry
- (Croatia) Damir Burić
- (Croatia) Nikola Jurčević
- (Denmark) Michael Lumb
- (Georgia (country)) Alexander Iashvili
- (Georgia (country)) Levan Kobiashvili
- (Germany) Dennis Aogo
- (Germany) Martin Braun
- (Germany) Michael Frontzeck
- (Germany) Richard Golz
- (Germany) Jörg Heinrich
- (Germany) Andreas Hinkel
- (Germany) Sebastian Kehl
- (Germany) Ralf Kohl
- (Germany) Joachim Löw
- (Germany) Stefan Müller
- (Germany) Sascha Riether
- (Germany) Jörg Schmadtke
- (Germany) Karl-Heinz Schulz
- (Germany) Martin Spanring
- (Germany) Uwe Spies
- (Germany) Axel Sundermann
- (Germany) Jens Todt
- (Germany) Uwe Wassmer
- (Germany) Marco Weißhaupt
- (Germany) Günther Wienhold
- (Germany) Tobias Willi
- (Germany) Andreas Zeyer
- (Iran) Ferydoon Zandi
- (South Korea) Cha Du-ri
- (Lebanon) Roda Antar
- (Lebanon) Youssef Mohamad
- (Mali) Soumaila Coulibaly
- (Mali) Boubacar Diarra
- (Netherlands) Harry Decheiver
- (Senegal) Papiss Cissé
- (Senegal) Souleyman Sané
- (Slovenia) Miran Pavlin
- (Switzerland) Alain Sutter
- (Tunisia) Zoubeir Baya
- (Tunisia) Mehdi Ben Slimane
- (Tunisia) Adel Sellimi
- (Turkey) Çağlar Söyüncü
- (United States) Paul Caligiuri

== Club staff ==
Position	Name
Head coach	(Germany) Julian Schuster
Assistant coach	(Germany) Lars Voßler (Germany) Florian Bruns (Switzerland) Patrik Grolimund
Assistant coach analysis	(Germany) Franz-Georg Wieland
Goalkeeping coach	(Germany) Michael Müller
Fitness coach	(Switzerland) Daniel Wolf (Germany) Maximilian Kessler
Individual coach	(Germany) Felix Roth
Team manager	(Germany) Tobias Schätzle
Performance analyst	(Germany) Heiko Sander
Data analyst	(Germany) Leon Krämer
Team doctor	(Germany) Dr. Jochen Gruber (Germany) PD Dr. Helge Eberbach (Germany) Dr. Dr. Markus Wenning (Germany) Prof. Dr. Torben Pottgießer
Physiotherapeut / Sportphysiotherapeut	(Germany) Florian Mack
Massage therapist / Sports physiotherapist	(Germany) Uwe Vetter
Physiotherapist	(Germany) Markus Behrens (Germany) Torge Schwarz
Rehabilitation trainer	(Germany) Matthias Rosa
Equipment manager	(Germany) Max Beckmann (Germany) Josef Friedrich
Bus driver	(Germany) Stefan Spohn

== Head coaches ==
Coaches of the club since 1946:

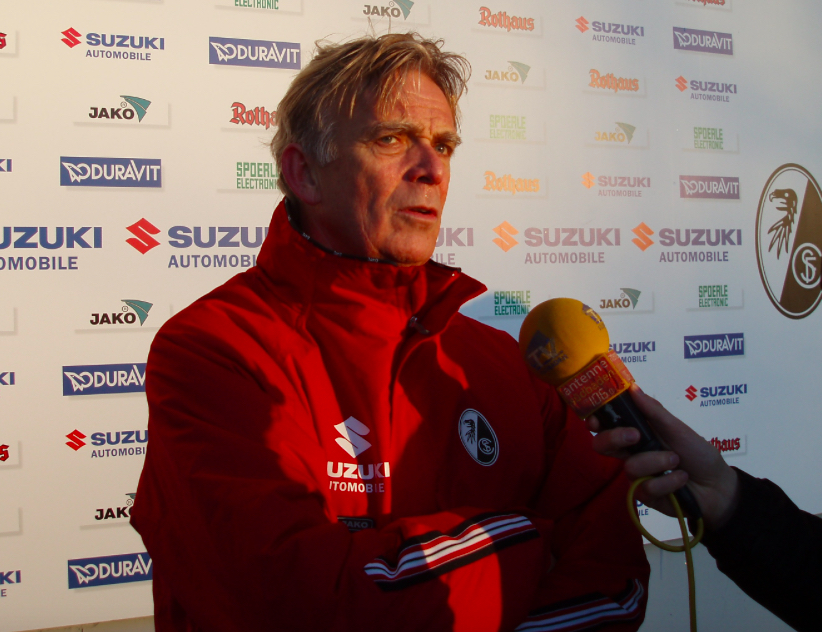
Volker Finke, former coach of SCF and longest serving coach in German football history

- (Germany) Andreas Munkert (1946–49)
- Arthur Mattes (1949–50)
- (Germany) Andreas Munkert (1950–53) (second time)
- Willi Hornung (1953–55)
- Kurt Mannschott (1956–58)
- (Germany) Hans Roggow (1960–63)
- (Germany) Hans Faber (1963–64)
- (Germany) Hans Diehl (1964–69)
- (Germany) Edgar Heilbrunner (1969–72)
- (Germany) Manfred Brief (1 July 1972 – 30 September 1978)
- (Germany) Heinz Baas (30 Sep 1978 – 30 June 1979)
- (Germany) Norbert Wagner (1 July 1979 – 24 January 1980)
- (Germany) Jupp Becker (1 July 1980 – 24 January 1981)
- (Germany) Horst Zick (25 Jan 1981 – 30 June 1981)
- (Germany) Lutz Hangartner (1 July 1981 – 30 June 1982)
- (Germany) Werner Olk (1 July 1982 – 30 June 1983)
- (Germany) Fritz Fuchs (1 July 1983 – 30 June 1984)
- (Socialist Federal Republic of Yugoslavia) Antun Rudinski (1 July 1984 – 1 January 1986)
- (Germany) Jupp Becker (25 Jan 1986 – 22 March 1986) (second time)
- (Germany) Horst Zick (23 March 1986 – 30 June 1986) (second time)
- (Germany) Jörg Berger (1 July 1986 – 17 December 1988)
- (Germany) Fritz Fuchs (1 Jan 1989 – 8 April 1989) (second time)
- (Germany) Uwe Ehret (9 April 1989 – 30 June 1989)
- (Germany) Lorenz-Günther Köstner (1 July 1989 – 26 August 1989)
- (Germany) Uwe Ehret (27 Aug 1989 – 26 November 1989) (second time)
- (Germany) Bernd Hoß (1 Dec 1989 – 30 June 1990)
- (Germany) Eckhard Krautzun (1 July 1990 – 30 June 1991)
- (Germany) Volker Finke (1 July 1991 – 20 May 2007)
- (Germany) Robin Dutt (June 2007 –30 June 2011)
- (Germany) Marcus Sorg (1 July 2011 – 29 December 2011)
- (Germany) Christian Streich (29 Dec 2011 –18 Mar 2024)
- (Germany) Julian Schuster (22 Mar 2024 –)

== Recent seasons ==
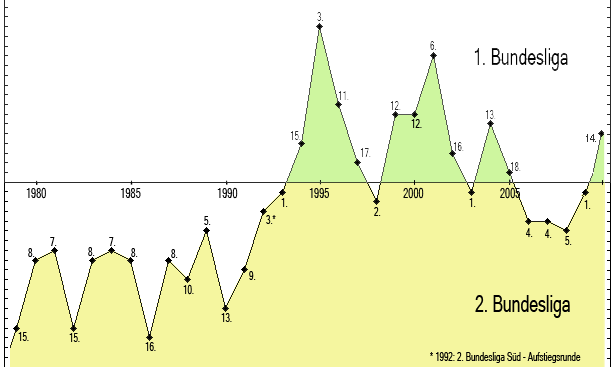

The recent season-by-season performance of the club:

=== SC Freiburg ===
Season	Division	Tier	Position
1999–2000	Bundesliga	I	12th
2000–01	Bundesliga	I	6th
2001–02	Bundesliga	I	16th↓
2002–03	2. Bundesliga	II	1st↑
2003–04	Bundesliga	I	13th
2004–05	Bundesliga	I	18th↓
2005–06	2. Bundesliga	II	4th
2006–07	2. Bundesliga	II	4th
2007–08	2. Bundesliga	II	5th
2008–09	2. Bundesliga	II	1st↑
2009–10	Bundesliga	I	14th
2010–11	Bundesliga	I	9th
2011–12	Bundesliga	I	12th
2012–13	Bundesliga	I	5th
2013–14	Bundesliga	I	14th
2014–15	Bundesliga	I	17th↓
2015–16	2. Bundesliga	II	1st↑
2016–17	Bundesliga	I	7th
2017–18	Bundesliga	I	15th
2018–19	Bundesliga	I	13th
2019–20	Bundesliga	I	8th
2020–21	Bundesliga	I	10th
2021–22	Bundesliga	I	6th
2022–23	Bundesliga	I	5th
2023–24	Bundesliga	I	10th
2024–25	Bundesliga	I	5th
2025–26	Bundesliga	I	7th
2026–27	Bundesliga	I	

=== SC Freiburg II ===
Season	Division	Tier	Position
1999–2000	Oberliga Baden-Württemberg	IV	6th
2000–01	Oberliga Baden-Württemberg	IV	6th
2001–02	Oberliga Baden-Württemberg	IV	7th
2002–03	Oberliga Baden-Württemberg	IV	3rd
2003–04	Oberliga Baden-Württemberg	IV	5th
2004–05	Oberliga Baden-Württemberg	IV	4th
2005–06	Oberliga Baden-Württemberg	IV	4th
2006–07	Oberliga Baden-Württemberg	IV	7th
2007–08	Oberliga Baden-Württemberg	IV	1st↑
2008–09	Regionalliga Süd	IV	14th
2009–10	Regionalliga Süd	IV	3rd
2010–11	Regionalliga Süd	IV	7th
2011–12	Regionalliga Süd	IV	8th
2012–13	Regionalliga Südwest	IV	7th
2013–14	Regionalliga Südwest	IV	2nd
2014–15	Regionalliga Südwest	IV	7th
2015–16	Regionalliga Südwest	IV	14th ↓
2016–17	Oberliga Baden-Württemberg	V	1st ↑
2017–18	Regionalliga Südwest	IV	4th
2018–19	Regionalliga Südwest	IV	7th
2019–20	Regionalliga Südwest	IV	13th
2020–21	Regionalliga Südwest	IV	1st ↑
2021–22	3. Liga	III	11th
2022–23	3. Liga	III	2nd
2023–24	3. Liga	III	20th ↓
2024–25	Regionalliga Südwest	IV	7th
2025–26	Regionalliga Südwest	IV	11th

- With the introduction of the Regionalligas in 1994 and the 3. Liga in 2008 as the new third tier, below the 2. Bundesliga, all leagues below dropped one tier. In 2012, the number of Regionalligas was increased from three to five with all Regionalliga Süd clubs except the Bavarian ones entering the new Regionalliga Südwest.

Key

↑ Promoted	↓ Relegated

== Notable chairmen ==
- (Germany) Achim Stocker † (1972–2009)
