= 2014–15 SC Freiburg season =

SC Freiburg
2014–15 season
- Chairman: Fritz Keller
- Manager: Christian Streich
- Stadium: Schwarzwald-Stadion
- Bundesliga: 17th (relegated)
- DFB-Pokal: Quarter-finals
- Top goalscorer: Nils Petersen (9)
- Highest home attendance: 24,000 (sold out) (Note: 10 times: 1. Matchday 2 of the Bundesliga on 31 August 2014 against Borussia Mönchengladbach; 2. Matchday 11 of the Bundesliga on 8 November 2014 against FC Schalke 04; 3. Matchday 13 of the Bundesliga on 28 November 2014 against VfB Stuttgart; 4. Matchday 15 of the Bundesliga on 13 December 2014 against Hamburger SV; 5. Matchday 18 of the Bundesliga on 31 January 2015 against Eintracht Frankfurt; 6. Matchday 20 of the Bundesliga on 7 February 2015 against Borussia Dortmund; 7. Matchday 24 of the Bundesliga on 7 March 2015 against SV Werder Bremen; 8. Matchday 29 of the Bundesliga on 18 April 2015 against 1. FSV Mainz 05; 9. Matchday 31 of the Bundesliga on 3 May 2015 against SC Paderborn 07; 10. Matchday 33 of the Bundesliga on 16 May 2015 against FC Bayern Munich)
- Lowest home attendance: 18,800 (Note: Round of 16 of the DFB-Pokal on 3 March 2015 against 1. FC Köln)
- Average home league attendance: 23,850
- Biggest win: 1860 Munich 2–5 SC Freiburg (Note: Round 2 of the DFB-Pokal on 29 October 2014 (away match)); SC Freiburg 4–1 Eintracht Frankfurt (Note: Matchday 18 of the Bundesliga on 31 January 2015 (home match))
- Biggest defeat: SC Freiburg 1–4 VfB Stuttgart (Note: Matchday 13 of the Bundesliga on 28 November 2014 (home match)); SC Freiburg 0–3 Borussia Dortmund (Note: Matchday 20 of the Bundesliga on 7 February 2015 (home match)); VfL Wolfsburg 3–0 SC Freiburg (Note: Matchday 25 of the Bundesliga on 15 March 2015 (away match))
Home colours	Away colours	Third colours
- All statistics correct as of 16 May 2015.

The 2014–15 SC Freiburg season was the 111th season in the football club's history and sixth consecutive and 16th overall season in the top flight of German football, the Bundesliga, having been promoted from the 2. Bundesliga in 2009. SC Freiburg also participated in the season's edition of the domestic cup, the DFB-Pokal. It was the 60th season for SC Freiburg in the Schwarzwald-Stadion, located in Freiburg im Breisgau. It covered a period from 25 June 2014 to 24 June 2015.

== Season overview ==
=== Background ===
SC Freiburg finished the previous season in 14th place, two spots above the relegation zone, ensuring that they would participate in this season's Bundesliga. Freiburg advanced to the third round in the previous season, having lost to Bayer Leverkusen. In the previous season, Freiburg was unable to qualify for Europe, having been lower in the table. In the previous season's UEFA Europa League, Freiburg finished third in Group H, having been three points short of second-placed Slovan Liberec.

=== June ===
SC Freiburg's pre-season training officially started on 25 June 2014.

In Freiburg's first pre-season friendly of the year, they faced Freiburger Regio-Auswahl on 28 June 2014. The match ended in a 5–0 win for Freiburg. Vladimír Darida opened the scoring for Freiburg in the 13th minute. Sebastian Freis then scored in the 24th minute, with another goal in the 27th minute from Philipp Zulechner to give Freiburg a three-point lead going into half-time. Maximilian Philipp then scored in the 51st minute, and Philipp Zulechner completed a brace in the 68th minute to secure a win for Freiburg. The match ended in the 70th minute due to a thunderstorm.

=== July ===
The second pre-season friendly was against FV Tennenbronn on 2 July 2014. The match ended with a 14–0 win for SC Freiburg. Oliver Sorg was the first to score in the 15th minute, followed by goals from Caleb Stanko in the 28th minute, Philipp Zulechner in the 32nd minute, Felix Klaus in the 40th minute, and Sebastian Freis in the 43rd minute to give SC Freiburg a five-point lead at halftime. Karim Guédé then converted from the penalty spot in the 47th minute, followed a brace from Jonathan Schmid in the 53rd and 58th minutes. Nicolas Höfler then scored in the 59th minute, followed another brace from Vladimír Darida in the 61st and 71st minutes. In between, Sebastian Kerk scored his first goal in the 63rd minute, and then completed a hat-trick with additional goals in the 87th and 90th minutes.

The next friendly match SC Freiburg played was against Swiss team FC Winterthur on 5 July 2014. The match ended in a 6–3 win to SC Freiburg. Kristian Kuzmanović scored the first goal in the 9th minute to give his side the lead. SC Freiburg equalized after a goal from Fallou Diagne in the 15th minute, and subsequently gained the lead by a goal from Vladimír Darida in the 20th minute. Antonio Marchesano scored a goal for FC Winterthur in the 29th minute to put the game level at two. In the 31st minute, Sebastian Kerk converted a penalty to regain the lead for SC Freiburg. Mike Frantz completed a brace with goals in the 60th and 74th minute to secure a win for SC Freiburg. Tim Schraml scored in between these goals in the 65th minute.

On 8 July 2014, SC Freiburg faced German club SV Endingen. The match ended in a 0–3 win. Felix Klaus scored the opening goal in the match in the seventh minute. Additional goals from Karim Guédé in the 55th minute and Jonathan Schmid in the 86th minute secured the win.

On 18 July 2014, SC Freiburg played their next pre-season friendly against 2. Bundesliga side VfR Aalen. The match ended in a 1–1 draw. Nejmeddin Daghfous opened the scoring for his side in the 71st minute. SC Freiburg replied with an equalizer in the 82nd minute by Pavel Krmaš to end the match in a draw.

In their third pre-season match, SC Freiburg faced Swiss club FC St. Gallen on 22 July 2014. The match ended in a 1–0 win for SC Freiburg. The only goal of the match came from Charles-Elie Laprévotte in the 9th minute.

Four days later, on 26 July 2014, SC Freiburg faced Torpedo Moscow, a Russian team. The match ended in a 0–2 loss. Dmitry Aydov opened the scoring in the 44th minute from a penalty to give his side the lead before halftime. He then completed a brace by scoring a goal in the 55th minute to give his side the win.

=== August ===
On 1 August 2014, SC Freiburg faced fellow city team and Oberliga Baden-Württemberg side Freiburger FC in the semi-finals of the yearly friendly tournament, the Kaiserstuhl Cup. This was the 30th annual pre-season cup. The match ended in a 2–0 win, with goals coming on either side of the half. Denis Perger scored a goal in the 39th minute giving his side a 1-point lead going into halftime. Then, late in the game, Sebastian Freis scored a goal in the 90th minute to put his team up by 2 and secured the win, advancing SC Freiburg to the final.

On 2 August 2014, SC Freiburg faced French team Rennes in the final of the Kaiserstuhl Cup. The match ended in a 1–3 loss. Goals came early for the French opposition. Mexer opened the scoring in the sixth minute, followed by a brace by Paul-Georges Ntep in the 10th and 18th minutes. Felix Klaus put his side on the scoresheet before halftime, in the 44th minute. This was only a consolation goal through, and Rennes won the match, leaving SC Freiburg as runners-up in the Kaiserstuhl Cup.

On 9 August 2014, SC Freiburg played their last pre-season friendly of the year against English club Stoke City. The match ended in a 1–1 draw. Pavel Krmaš opened the scoring in the second minute to give SC Freiburg an early lead. Mame Biram Diouf equalized for his team in the 39th minute, which was the final goal of the match.

SC Freiburg were drawn against Eintracht Trier in the first round of the DFB-Pokal. The match took place on 17 August 2015. The match ended in a 2–0 win. The opposition gathered a total of seven yellow cards during the match. Julian Schuster opened the scoring for SC Freiburg in the 51st minute from a penalty. Then Karim Guédé scored a goal in the 68th minute insuring SC Freiburg would advance to the second round of the DFB-Pokal with the away win.

The opening match of SC Freiburg's Bundesliga campaign was against Eintracht Frankfurt on matchday 1. The match took place on 23 August 2014, and ended in a 0–1 loss. Haris Seferovic scored the only goal of the match for their side. With the away loss SC Freiburg ended the matchday in 16th place.

On matchday 2, on 31 August 2014, SC Freiburg faced Borussia Mönchengladbach, who were sitting at 10th in the league table. The match ended in a 0–0 draw. Admir Mehmedi had a chance to put SC Freiburg up from the penalty spot, but failed to convert SC Freiburg's best opportunity in the 63rd minute. With the home draw, SC Freiburg ended the matchday in 14th place. After this match, the international break started.

=== September ===
During the international break, SC Freiburg scheduled a friendly with 2. Bundesliga club 1. FC Kaiserslautern. The match took place on 5 September 2014, and ended in a 0–4 loss. Karim Matmour opened the scoring in the eighth minute, and ended up with a brace with another goal in the 23rd minute. Between these goals, Marcel Gaus put his side up by two. Sebastian Jacob rounded off the scoring with a goal in the 71st minute, securing a win for his side.

=== October ===
During the second international break, SC Freiburg scheduled another friendly against Swiss club Young Boys. The match took place on 10 October 2014, and ended in a 2–1 win. Adrian Nikçi opened the scoring for his side in the 57th minute, but SC Freiburg came back to win with goals by Sebastian Freis in the 71st minute and Jonathan Schmid in the 79th minute. The match was cut short in the 80th minute, after there was a floodlight failure.

=== November ===
During the third international break, SC Freiburg faced Swiss club FC Aarau on 13 November 2014. The match ended in a 3–1 win for SC Freiburg. Dani Schahin opened the scoring for Freiburg in the 24th minute. Marvin Spielmann then equalized for Aarau in the 72nd minute. Then Sebastian Freis scored five minutes later in the 77th minute, and Christos Almpanis scored in the 79th minute to insure the victory for Freiburg.

=== January ===
During the winter break, Freiburg scheduled numerous friendlies as they traveled to Spain. On 14 January 2015, Freiburg were scheduled to play two friendly matches. The first was scheduled to be against the Ghana national team, but Ghana cancelled the friendly due to worries about further injuries that could hinder their chances in the 2015 Africa Cup of Nations. Instead, Freiburg faced Albanian team Skënderbeu Korçë. The match ended in a 0–1 loss after Gerhard Progni put his side ahead in the 22nd minute.

The next winter friendly Freiburg played was later that day against fellow Bundesliga club Mainz 05. The result was a 1–0 win with a goal from Sascha Riether in the 30th minute.

Another two additional matches were played on 18 January 2015. The first was against German 3. Liga team Preußen Münster. The match ended in a 4–1 win to Freiburg. Youth team player Florian Kath scored the opening goal in the 5th minute. In the 12th minute, a Preußen Münster defender scored an own goal to double the lead for Freiburg. Jonathan Schmid put another goal back for Freiburg to make the lead three. After half-time, Amaury Bischoff converted a penalty to get his team on the board. Freiburg put another goal back in the 54th minute to wrap up the game.

Later that day, Freiburg played another winter friendly against 3. Liga club Karlsruher SC. The match ended in a 0–5 loss. Park Jung-bin opened the score for Karlsruhe, then Rouwen Hennings scored a goal in the 31st minute to give his side a two-point lead at half-time. In the second half, Iliyan Mitsanski completed a brace in the 49th and 77th minutes, with a goal from Daniel Gordon in between in the 66th minute to wrap up a win for their side. This was Freiburg's last match in Spain.

On 24 January 2015, Freiburg faced Swiss club Basel in their final winter friendly. The match ended in a 0–2 loss. Marco Streller opened the scoring for Basel in the 32nd minute, and Mohamed Elneny doubled it in the 40th minute to secure the win for their side.

The Bundesliga season resumed on 31 January 2015 on matchday 18 against Eintracht Frankfurt. Freiburg won 4–1, one of their largest wins of the season. Freiburg went down a goal after Marco Russ scored a goal in the 1st minute. Freiburg equalized with a penalty taken by Vladimír Darida in the 61st minute. In his league debut versus Eintracht Frankfurt, Nils Petersen scored a hat-trick, despite just coming on as a substitute for the second half. His goals came in the 63rd, 69th and 88th minute, securing the win for Freiburg. With the home win, Freiburg ended the matchday in 14th place.

=== May ===
On 2 May 2015, matchday 31 of the Bundesliga, Freiburg faced SC Paderborn at home, who were sitting 17th in the table. Freiburg lost 1–2. Nils Petersen was the first to score in the match, giving Freiburg a lead in the 40th minute. Lukas Rupp equalized for Paderborn in the 70th minute, and completed a brace with another goal in the 80th minute, giving his side the win. Freiburg ended the match in 16th place.

On 8 May 2015, a Friday match, matchday 32 of the Bundesliga, Freiburg faced Hamburger SV away, who were sitting 14th in the table. The match drew 1–1. Admir Mehmedi put Freiburg up in the 25th minute. The score held until the 90th minute, when Gojko Kačar scored a late equalizer for Hamburg to end the match with a draw. Freiburg ended the match in 15th place.

On 16 May 2015, Freiburg were up against Bayern Munich. FC Bayern Munich were 1st in the table, and had already won the Bundesliga. Freiburg had not beaten Bayern in over 19 years. The match ended in a 2–1 win for Freiburg, their first win in the last six matches. Bastian Schweinsteiger scored for Bayern in the 13th minute. Freiburg responded with an equalizer in the 33rd minute by Mehmedi. The game remained level until the 89th minute, when Nils Petersen, a former Bayern player, gave Freiburg a late winner, continuing Bayern's Bundesliga losing streak with three in a row. Freiburg were in 14th place at the end of the matchday, still in a battle to avoid relegation with five other teams. Freiburg would be safe if they at least draw their next match. They would be in the relegation play-off spot if they lose, VfB Stuttgart wins, and Hamburger SV fail to win. They would be relegated if they lost and VfB Stuttgart and Hamburger SV failed won.

== Players ==
=== Squad information ===
N	Pos.	Nat.	Name	Age	EU	Since	App	Goals	Ends	Transfer fee	Notes
1	GK	(Switzerland)	Roman Bürki	35	Non-EU	2014	34	0	2018	€ 1.8M	
2	DF	(Czech Republic)	Pavel Krmaš	46	EU	2007	169	9	2015	€ 0.68M	
3	DF	(Spain)	Marc Torrejón	40	EU	2014	22	0	2017	€ 1.2M	
5	DF	(France)	Christopher Jullien	33	EU	2015 (Winter)	1	0	2017	Youth system	
7	MF	(Czech Republic)	Vladimír Darida	36	EU	2013	59	11	2018	€ 4M	
8	MF	(Germany)	Mike Frantz	40	EU	2014	25	4	2018	€ 1M	
11	FW	(Germany)	Dani Schahin	37	EU	2014	14	0	2015	Free	Loaned from 1. FSV Mainz 05. Second nationality: (Ukraine)
14	FW	(Switzerland)	Admir Mehmedi	35	Non-EU	2014	70	19	2019	€ 4M	Second nationality: (North Macedonia)
15	DF	(Serbia)	Stefan Mitrović	36	Non-EU	2014	14	0	2018	€ 1.5M	
16	MF	(Norway)	Mats Møller Dæhli	31	Non-EU	2015 (Winter)	2	0	2018	€ 1.5M	Transferred during the season from Cardiff City F.C.
17	MF	(France)	Jonathan Schmid	36	EU	2011 (Winter)	129	22	2018	Youth system	
18	FW	(Germany)	Nils Petersen	37	EU	2015 (Winter)	10	7	2015	€ 0.2M	Loaned during the season from SV Werder Bremen.
19	GK	(Germany)	Daniel Batz	35	EU	2011	1	0	2016	Free	
20	DF	(Germany)	Marc-Oliver Kempf	31	EU	2014	15	2	2018	€ 0.8M	
21	GK	(Germany)	Sebastian Mielitz	37	EU	2014	2	0	2017	Free	
22	DF	(Germany)	Sascha Riether (vice-captain)	43	EU	2014	172	5	2017	€ 0.35M	
23	MF	(Germany)	Julian Schuster (captain)	41	EU	2008	198	18	2016	€ 0.15M	
24	DF	(Bosnia and Herzegovina)	Mensur Mujdža (vice-captain)	42	Non-EU	2009	107	1	2016	€ 0.5M	Second nationality: (Croatia)
25	DF	(Germany)	Oliver Sorg (vice-captain)	36	EU	2011 (Winter)	119	3	2016	Youth system	
26	MF	(Germany)	Maximilian Philipp	32	EU	2014	26	1	2017	Youth system	
27	MF	(Germany)	Nicolas Höfler	36	EU	2010	40	2	2017	Youth system	
30	DF	(Germany)	Christian Günter	33	EU	2012	80	1	2019	Youth system	
31	MF	(Slovakia)	Karim Guédé	41	EU	2012 (Winter)	78	7	2016	€ 0.3M	Second nationality: (Togo)
33	MF	(United States)	Caleb Stanko	33	Non-EU	2014	0	0	2017	Youth system	Second nationality: (Poland)
36	MF	(Germany)	Felix Klaus	34	EU	2013	54	7	2017	€ 1.1M	
41	DF	(Germany)	Immanuel Höhn	34	EU	2012 (Winter)	48	1	2017	Youth system	

- Last updated: 9 May 2015
- Source: Soccerway
- Ordered by squad number.

==== From youth squad ====
N	Pos.	Nat.	Name	Age	EU	Since	App	Goals	Ends	Transfer fee	Notes
51	MF	(Germany)	Florian Kath	32	EU	2015 (Winter)	1	0	2018	Youth system	From youth squad.

- Last updated: 15 February 2015
- Source: Soccerway

==== Loans ====
N	Pos.	Nat.	Name	Age	EU	Since	App	Goals	Ends	Transfer fee	Notes
6	DF	(Norway)	Vegar Eggen Hedenstad	35	Non-EU	2012	21	0	2016	€ 0.44M	Loaned to Eintracht Braunschweig.
9	FW	(Austria)	Philipp Zulechner	36	EU	2014 (Winter)	9	1	2017	€ 0.616M	Loaned during the season to FK Austria Wien.
~~11~~	MF	(Germany)	Hendrick Zuck	36	EU	2013 (Winter)	3	2	2016	€ 0.44M	Loaned to Eintracht Braunschweig.
~~21~~	GK	(Germany)	Alexander Schwolow	34	EU	2012 (Winter)	1	0	2017	Youth system	Loaned to Arminia Bielefeld.
37	MF	(Germany)	Sebastian Kerk	32	EU	2013	38	1	2018	Youth system	Loaned during the season to 1. FC Nürnberg.

- Last updated: 15 January 2015
- Source: Soccerway
- Ordered by former squad number.

==== Mid-season transfers ====
N	Pos.	Nat.	Name	Age	EU	Since	App	Goals	Ends	Transfer fee	Notes
35	FW	(Germany)	Sebastian Freis	45	EU	2012 (Winter)	61	8	~~2016~~	Free	Transferred during the season to SpVgg Greuther Fürth.

- Last updated: 10 January 2015
- Source: Soccerway

=== Transfers ===
==== In ====
No.	Pos.	Nat.	Name	Age	EU	Moving from	Type	Transfer window	Ends	Transfer fee	Source
1	GK	(Switzerland)	Roman Bürki	23	Non-EU	Grasshopper Club Zürich (Switzerland)	Transfer	Summer	2018	€ 1.8M	Soccerway
3	DF	(Spain)	Marc Torrejón	28	EU	1. FC Kaiserslautern	Transfer	Summer	2017	€ 1.2M	Soccerway
5	DF	(France)	Christopher Jullien	21	EU	SC Freiburg II	Promoted	Winter	2017	Youth system	Soccerway
8	MF	(Germany)	Mike Frantz	27	EU	1. FC Nürnberg	Transfer	Summer	2018	€ 1M	Soccerway
11	FW	(Germany)	Dani Schahin	25	EU	Mainz 05	Loan	Summer	2015	Free	Soccerway
14	FW	(Switzerland)	Admir Mehmedi	23	Non-EU	Dynamo Kyiv (Ukraine)	Transfer	Summer	2019	€ 4M	Soccerway
15	DF	(Serbia)	Stefan Mitrović	24	Non-EU	Benfica (Portugal)	Transfer	Summer	2018	€ 1.5M	Soccerway
16	MF	(Norway)	Mats Møller Dæhli	19	Non-EU	Cardiff City (Wales)	Transfer	Winter	2018	€ 1.5M	Soccerway
18	FW	(Germany)	Nils Petersen	26	EU	Werder Bremen	Loan	Winter	2015	€ 0.2M	Soccerway
20	DF	(Germany)	Marc-Oliver Kempf	19	EU	Eintracht Frankfurt	Transfer	Summer	2018	€ 0.8M	Soccerway
21	GK	(Germany)	Sebastian Mielitz	24	EU	Werder Bremen	Transfer	Summer	2017	Free	Soccerway
22	DF	(Germany)	Sascha Riether	31	EU	Fulham (England)	Transfer	Summer	2017	€ 0.35M	Soccerway
26	MF	(Germany)	Maximilian Philipp	20	EU	SC Freiburg II	Promoted	Summer	2017	Youth system	Soccerway
33	MF	(United States)	Caleb Stanko	20	Non-EU	SC Freiburg II	Promoted	Summer	2017	Youth system	Soccerway
(Note: Was never given a number)	DF	(Slovenia)	Denis Perger	21	EU	Wehen Wiesbaden	Loan return	Summer	2014	Free	Soccerway

Last updated: 1 January 2015

==== Out ====
No.	Pos.	Nat.	Name	Age	EU	Moving to	Type	Transfer window	Transfer fee	Source
1	GK	(Germany)	Oliver Baumann	24	EU	1899 Hoffenheim	Transfer	Summer	€ 5.5M	Soccerway
3	DF	(Senegal)	Fallou Diagne	25	Non-EU	Rennes (France)	Transfer	Summer	€ 1.5M	Soccerway
4	MF	(Switzerland)	Gélson Fernandes	27	Non-EU	Rennes (France)	Transfer	Summer	€ 1.6M	Soccerway
5	DF	(France)	Christopher Jullien	21	EU	SC Freiburg II	Demoted	Summer	Youth system	Soccerway
6	DF	(Norway)	Vegar Eggen Hedenstad	23	Non-EU	Eintracht Braunschweig	Loan	Summer	Free	Soccerway
8	MF	(Czech Republic)	Václav Pilař	25	EU	VfL Wolfsburg	End of loan	Summer	Free	Soccerway
9	FW	(Germany)	Mike Hanke	30	EU	Guizhou Renhe F.C. (China)	Transfer	Summer	Free	Soccerway
11	MF	(Germany)	Hendrick Zuck	23	EU	Eintracht Braunschweig	Loan	Summer	Free	Soccerway
14	FW	(Switzerland)	Admir Mehmedi	23	Non-EU	Dynamo Kyiv (Ukraine)	End of loan	Summer	Free	Soccerway
15	FW	(Austria)	Philipp Zulechner	24	EU	Austria Wien	Loan	Winter	Free	Soccerway
20	MF	(France)	Francis Coquelin	23	EU	Arsenal (England)	End of loan	Summer	Free	Soccerway
21	GK	(Germany)	Alexander Schwolow	22	EU	Arminia Bielefeld	Loan	Summer	Free	Soccerway
22	FW	(Germany)	Marco Terrazzino	23	EU	VfL Bochum	Transfer	Summer	Free	Soccerway
28	MF	(Germany)	Matthias Ginter	20	EU	Borussia Dortmund	Transfer	Summer	€ 10M	Soccerway
35	FW	(Germany)	Sebastian Freis	19	EU	SpVgg Greuther Fürth	Transfer	Winter	Free	Soccerway
37	MF	(Germany)	Sebastian Kerk	20	EU	1. FC Nürnberg	Loan	Winter	Free	Soccerway
	DF	(Slovenia)	Denis Perger	21	EU	SC Freiburg II	Demoted	Summer	Youth system	Soccerway

Last updated: 15 January 2015

== Statistics ==
=== Goals and appearances ===
No.	Pos	Nat	Player	Total		Bundesliga		DFB-Pokal	
No.	Pos	Nat	Player	Apps	Goals	Apps	Goals	Apps	Goals
1	GK	(Switzerland) SUI	Roman Bürki	34	0	32	0	2	0
2	DF	(Czech Republic) CZE	Pavel Krmaš	21	0	20	0	1	0
3	DF	(Spain) ESP	Marc Torrejón	22	0	19	0	3	0
5	DF	(France) FRA	Christopher Jullien	1	0	1	0	0	0
7	MF	(Czech Republic) CZE	Vladimír Darida	32	7	29	6	3	1
8	MF	(Germany) GER	Mike Frantz	25	4	23	4	2	0
11	FW	(Germany) GER	Dani Schahin	14	0	12	0	2	0
14	FW	(Switzerland) SUI	Admir Mehmedi	30	6	26	3	4	3
15	DF	(Serbia) SRB	Stefan Mitrović	14	0	12	0	2	0
16	MF	(Norway) NOR	Mats Møller Dæhli	2	0	2	0	0	0
17	MF	(France) FRA	Jonathan Schmid	35	5	31	4	4	1
18	FW	(Germany) GER	Nils Petersen	10	7	10	7	0	0
19	GK	(Germany) GER	Daniel Batz	0	0	0	0	0	0
20	DF	(Germany) GER	Marc-Oliver Kempf	15	2	13	2	2	0
21	GK	(Germany) GER	Sebastian Mielitz	2	0	0	0	2	0
22	DF	(Germany) GER	Sascha Riether	21	0	19	0	2	0
23	MF	(Germany) GER	Julian Schuster	24	1	21	0	3	1
24	DF	(Bosnia and Herzegovina) BIH	Mensur Mujdža	10	0	8	0	2	0
25	DF	(Germany) GER	Oliver Sorg	27	1	25	1	2	0
26	MF	(Germany) GER	Maximilian Philipp	25	1	22	1	3	0
27	MF	(Germany) GER	Nicolas Höfler	20	0	18	0	2	0
30	DF	(Germany) GER	Christian Günter	35	1	32	1	3	0
31	MF	(Slovakia) SVK	Karim Guédé	20	1	16	0	4	1
33	MF	(United States) USA	Caleb Stanko	0	0	0	0	0	0
36	MF	(Germany) GER	Felix Klaus	32	2	29	2	3	0
41	DF	(Germany) GER	Immanuel Höhn	8	1	7	1	1	0
51	MF	(Germany) GER	Florian Kath (Note: From the youth squad)	1	0	1	0	0	0
Players who left during the season
(Note: His number before he was loaned was 9)	FW	(Austria) AUT	Philipp Zulechner (Note: Loaned out during the season)	2	0	2	0	0	0
(Note: His number before he transferred was 35)	FW	(Germany) GER	Sebastian Freis (Note: Transferred during the season)	9	1	7	0	2	1
(Note: His number before he was loaned was 37)	MF	(Germany) GER	Sebastian Kerk	11	1	9	1	2	0

- Last updated: 9 May 2015
- Source: Soccerway
- Ordered by squad number.

=== Goal scorers table ===
Rank	No.	Pos.	Nation	Player	Bundesliga	DFB-Pokal	Total
1	18	FW	(Germany)	Nils Petersen	8	0	8
2	7	MF	(Czech Republic)	Vladimír Darida	6	1	7
2	14	FW	(Switzerland)	Admir Mehmedi	4	3	7
4	17	MF	(France)	Jonathan Schmid	4	1	5
5	8	MF	(Germany)	Mike Frantz	4	0	4
6	20	DF	(Germany)	Marc-Oliver Kempf	2	0	2
6	36	MF	(Germany)	Felix Klaus	2	0	2
8		FW	(Germany)	Sebastian Freis	0	1	1
8	31	MF	(Slovakia)	Karim Guédé	0	1	1
8	30	DF	(Germany)	Christian Günter	1	0	1
8	41	DF	(Germany)	Immanuel Höhn	1	0	1
8		MF	(Germany)	Sebastian Kerk	1	0	1
8	26	MF	(Germany)	Maximilian Philipp	1	0	1
8	23	MF	(Germany)	Julian Schuster	0	1	1
8	25	DF	(Germany)	Oliver Sorg	1	0	1
Own goals					0	1	1
Total					33	9	42

Last updated: 16 May 2015.
Source: Competitions

=== Assists table ===
Rank	No.	Pos.	Nation	Player	Bundesliga	DFB-Pokal	Total
1	17	MF	(France)	Jonathan Schmid	11	2	13
2	26	MF	(Germany)	Maximilian Philipp	3	2	5
3	7	MF	(Czech Republic)	Vladimír Darida	1	2	3
3	31	MF	(Slovakia)	Karim Guédé	3	0	3
3	25	DF	(Germany)	Oliver Sorg	3	0	3
6		FW	(Germany)	Sebastian Freis	1	1	2
6	30	DF	(Germany)	Christian Günter	2	0	2
6	36	MF	(Germany)	Felix Klaus	2	0	2
9	8	MF	(Germany)	Mike Frantz	1	0	1
9	27	MF	(Germany)	Nicolas Höfler	1	0	1
9		MF	(Germany)	Sebastian Kerk	0	1	1
9	14	FW	(Switzerland)	Admir Mehmedi	1	0	1
9	18	FW	(Germany)	Nils Petersen	1	0	1
9	22	DF	(Germany)	Sascha Riether	0	1	1
Total					30	9	39

Last updated: 9 May 2015.
Source: Soccerway

=== Disciplinary record ===
N	P	Nat.	Name	Bundesliga			DFB-Pokal			Total			Notes
N	P	Nat.	Name	Yellow card	Second yellow card	Red card	Yellow card	Second yellow card	Red card	Yellow card	Second yellow card	Red card	Notes
1	GK	(Switzerland)	Roman Bürki	2						2			
2	DF	(Czech Republic)	Pavel Krmaš	5	1		1			6	1		Banned for two matches during the season.
3	DF	(Spain)	Marc Torrejón	3		1	1			4		1	Banned for three matches during the season.
7	MF	(Czech Republic)	Vladimír Darida	3		1				3		1	Banned for one match during the season.
8	MF	(Germany)	Mike Frantz	3						3			
11	FW	(Germany)	Dani Schahin	1			1			2			
14	FW	(Switzerland)	Admir Mehmedi	3						3			
15	DF	(Serbia)	Stefan Mitrović	1		1	1			2		1	Banned for two matches during the season.
17	MF	(France)	Jonathan Schmid	2						2			
20	DF	(Germany)	Marc-Oliver Kempf	3						3			
22	DF	(Germany)	Sascha Riether	3						3			
23	MF	(Germany)	Julian Schuster	7			1			8			Banned for one match during the season.
24	DF	(Bosnia and Herzegovina)	Mensur Mujdža	1			1			2			
25	DF	(Germany)	Oliver Sorg	3			1			4			
26	MF	(Germany)	Maximilian Philipp	4						4			
27	MF	(Germany)	Nicolas Höfler	2						2			
30	DF	(Germany)	Christian Günter	4						4			
31	MF	(Slovakia)	Karim Guédé	3						3			Banned for two matches during the season.
36	MF	(Germany)	Felix Klaus	5						5			Banned for one match during the season.
Players who left during the season
	FW	(Austria)	Philipp Zulechner	1						1			
	FW	(Germany)	Sebastian Freis	1						1			
	MF	(Germany)	Sebastian Kerk	1						1			

Last updated: 16 May 2015
Source: Competitions
Ordered by squad number.
(yellow card) = Number of bookings; (second yellow card) = Number of sending offs after a second yellow card; (red card) = Number of sending offs by a direct red card.

==== Suspensions ====
Player				Competition	Offence				Suspension details			
No.	Pos.	Nat.	Name	Competition	Event (description)	Date offence occurred	Round	Opponent	No. of matches served	Date served	Round	Opponent
31	MF	(Slovakia)	Karim Guédé	Bundesliga	Suspension through sports court (for unsportsmanlike conduct)	23 August 2014	MD 1	Eintracht Frankfurt	2	31 August 2014	MD 2	Borussia Mönchengladbach
31	MF	(Slovakia)	Karim Guédé	Bundesliga	Suspension through sports court (for unsportsmanlike conduct)	23 August 2014	MD 1	Eintracht Frankfurt	2	13 September 2014	MD 3	Borussia Dortmund
7	MF	(Czech Republic)	Vladimír Darida	Bundesliga	Red card suspension (direct red card)	23 September 2014	MD 5	1899 Hoffenheim	1	27 September 2014	MD 6	Bayer Leverkusen
2	DF	(Czech Republic)	Pavel Krmaš	Bundesliga	Indirect card suspension (second yellow card in match)	27 September 2014	MD 6	Bayer Leverkusen	1	4 October 2014	MD 7	Werder Bremen
15	DF	(Serbia)	Stefan Mitrović	Bundesliga	Red card suspension (direct red card)	28 November 2014	MD 13	VfB Stuttgart	2	6 December 2014	MD 14	SC Paderborn
15	DF	(Serbia)	Stefan Mitrović	Bundesliga	Red card suspension (direct red card)	28 November 2014	MD 13	VfB Stuttgart	2	13 December 2014	MD 15	Hamburger SV
3	DF	(Spain)	Marc Torrejón	Bundesliga	Red card suspension (direct red card)	21 February 2015	MD 22	1899 Hoffenheim	2	28 February 2015	MD 23	Bayer Leverkusen
3	DF	(Spain)	Marc Torrejón	Bundesliga	Red card suspension (direct red card)	21 February 2015	MD 22	1899 Hoffenheim	2	7 March 2015	MD 24	Werder Bremen
23	MF	(Germany)	Julian Schuster	Bundesliga	Yellow card suspension (fifth yellow card in season)	7 March 2015	MD 24	Werder Bremen	1	15 March 2015	MD 25	VfL Wolfsburg
3	DF	(Spain)	Marc Torrejón	Bundesliga	Yellow card suspension	15 March 2015	MD 25	VfL Wolfsburg	1	21 March 2015	MD 26	FC Augsburg
36	MF	(Germany)	Felix Klaus	Bundesliga	Yellow card suspension (fifth yellow card in season)	11 April 2015	MD 28	Schalke 04	1	18 April 2015	MD 29	Mainz 05
2	DF	(Czech Republic)	Pavel Krmaš	Bundesliga	Yellow card suspension (fifth yellow card in season)	18 April 2015	MD 29	Mainz 05	1	25 April 2015	MD 30	VfB Stuttgart

Last updated: 18 April 2015.
Source: Competitions

== Club staff ==
Position	Staff
Manager	Christian Streich
Assistant coaches	Lars Voßler; Patrick Baier
Goalkeeping trainer	Andreas Kronenberg
Athletic trainer	Simon Ickert
Masseur	Uwe Vetter
Sports physiotherapists	Uwe Vetter; Torge Schwarz; Markus Behrens
Team doctors	Dr. Thorsten Hammer; Dr. Gerrit Bode
Press spokesman	Rudi Raschke
Kit manager	Felix Isele
President	Fritz Keller
Chief financial officer	Oliver Leki
Sporting director	Jochen Saier

- Last updated: 13 April 2015
- Source: SC Freiburg (in German), Bundesliga

== Friendlies ==
Win Draw Loss

28 June 2014 Friendly	Freiburger Regio-Auswahl	0–5	SC Freiburg	Freiburg im Breisgau, Germany
18:00 CEST (UTC+02:00)		Report (in German)	Darida 13'; Freis 24'; Zulechner 47', 68'; Philipp 51'	Stadium: Weststadion
Note: The match ended in the 70th minute due to a thunderstorm.

2 July 2014 Friendly	SC Freiburg	14–0	FV Tennenbronn	Sankt Georgen im Schwarzwald, Germany
18:00 CEST (UTC+02:00)	Sorg 15'; Stanko 28'; Zulechner 32'; Klaus 40'; Freis 43'; Guédé 47' (pen.); Schmid 53', 58'; Höfler 59'; Darida 61', 71'; Kerk 63', 87', 90'	Report (in German)		Stadium: Roßbergstadion; Attendance: 3,000

5 July 2014 Friendly	SC Freiburg	6–3	(Switzerland) FC Winterthur	Offenburg, Germany
15:30 CEST (UTC+02:00)	Diagne 15'; Darida 20'; Kerk 31' (pen.); Frantz 60', 74'; Schraml 65'	Report (in German)	Kuzmanović 9'; Marchesano 29'; Schraml 81' (o.g.)	Stadium: Karl-Heitz-Stadion; Attendance: 1,189

8 July 2014 Friendly	SV Endingen	0–3	SC Freiburg	Endingen am Kaiserstuhl, Germany
18:00 CEST (UTC+02:00)		Report (in German)	Klaus 7'; Guédé 55'; Schmid 86'	Stadium: Erletal-Stadion; Attendance: 1,500

18 July 2014 Friendly	SC Freiburg	1–1	VfR Aalen	Ravensburg, Germany
17:30 CEST (UTC+02:00)	Krmaš 82'	Report (in German)	Daghfous 71'	Stadium: Ebra-Stadion; Attendance: 1,300

22 July 2014 Friendly	FC St. Gallen (Switzerland)	0–1	SC Freiburg	Henau, Germany
18:00 CEST (UTC+02:00)		Report (in German)	Laprevotte 9'	Stadium: Sportanlage Rüti; Attendance: 1,250

26 July 2014 Friendly	SC Freiburg	0–2	(Russia) Torpedo Moscow	Imst, Austria
17:00 CEST (UTC+02:00)		Report (in German)	Aydov 44' (pen.), 55'	Stadium: Gurgltalstadion; Attendance: 350

9 August 2014 Friendly	SC Freiburg	1–1	(England) Stoke City	Freiburg im Breisgau, Germany
17:30 CEST (UTC+02:00)	Krmaš 2'	Report (in German)	Diouf 39'	Stadium: Schwarzwald-Stadion; Attendance: 13,700; Referee: Dominik Schaal (Germany)

5 September 2014 Friendly	SC Freiburg	0–4	1. FC Kaiserslautern	Colmar, France
17:15 CEST (UTC+02:00)		Report (in German)	Matmour 8', 23'; Gaus 11'; Jacob 71'	Stadium: Colmar Stadium; Attendance: 400

10 October 2014 Friendly	SC Freiburg	2–1	(Switzerland) Young Boys	Lörrach, Germany
17:30 CEST (UTC+02:00)	Freis 71'; Schmid 79'	Report (in German)	Nikçi 57'	Stadium: Grüttpark-Stadion; Attendance: 2,200
Note: The match ended in the 80th minute due to a floodlight failure.

13 November 2014 Friendly	SC Freiburg	3–1	(Switzerland) FC Aarau	Freiburg im Breisgau, Germany
14:30 CET (UTC+01:00)	Schahin 24'; Freis 77'; Almpanis 79'	Report (in German)	Spielmann 72'	Stadium: Möslestadion; Attendance: 400

14 January 2015 Friendly	SC Freiburg	0–1	(Albania) Skënderbeu Korçë	Sotogrande, Spain
11:00 CET (UTC+01:00)		Report (in German)	Progni 22'	Stadium: Sotogrande Polo Pitch 1

14 January 2015 Friendly	SC Freiburg	1–0	Mainz 05	Marbella, Spain
18:00 CET (UTC+01:00)	Riether 30'	Report (in German)		Stadium: Estadio Municipal de Marbella

18 January 2015 Friendly	Preußen Münster	1–4	SC Freiburg	Sotogrande, Spain
11:00 CET (UTC+01:00)	Bischoff 47' (pen.)	Report (in German)	Kath 5'; 12' (o.g.); Schmid 26'; Sorg 54'	Stadium: Sotogrande Polo Pitch 1

18 January 2015 Friendly	SC Freiburg	0–5	Karlsruher SC	San Roque, Spain
15:30 CET (UTC+01:00)		Report (in German)	Park 19'; Hennings 31'; Mitsanski 49', 77'; Gordon 66'	Stadium: Hotel Almenara

24 January 2015 Friendly	FC Basel (Switzerland)	2–0	SC Freiburg	Basel, Switzerland
14:30 CET (UTC+01:00)	Streller 32'; Elneny 40'	Report (in German)		Stadium: Stadion Schützenmatte; Attendance: 1,828; Referee: Fabian Hänggi (Switzerland)

=== 30. AXA Kaiserstuhl-Cup 2014 ===
1 August 2014 Semi-finals	SC Freiburg	2–0	Freiburger FC	Bahlingen, Germany
19:00 CEST (UTC+02:00)	Perger 39'; Freis 90'	Report (in German)		Stadium: Kaiserstuhlstadion; Attendance: 3,480

2 August 2014 Final	SC Freiburg	1–3	(France) Rennes	Bahlingen, Germany
18:00 CEST (UTC+02:00)	Klaus 44'	Report (in German)	Mexer 6'; Ntep 10', 18'	Stadium: Kaiserstuhlstadion; Attendance: 3,600; Referee: Timo Gerrach (Germany)

== Competitions ==
=== Overall ===
Competition	Started round	Final position / round	First match	Last match
DFB-Pokal	Round 1	Quarter-finals	17 August 2014	7 April 2015
Bundesliga	—	17th	23 August 2014	23 May 2015

Updated to match played 16 May 2015
Source: Competitions

=== Overview ===
Competition	Record							
Competition	Pld	W	D	L	GF	GA	GD	Win %
Bundesliga	34	7	13	14	36	47	−11	20.59
DFB-Pokal	4	3	0	1	9	4	+5	75.00
Total	38	10	13	15	45	51	−6	26.32

Last updated: 16 May 2015
Source: Competitions

=== Bundesliga ===
==== League table ====
Pos	Team	Pld	W	D	L	GF	GA	GD	Pts	Qualification or relegation
14	VfB Stuttgart	34	9	9	16	42	60	−18	36	
15	Hertha BSC	34	9	8	17	36	52	−16	35	
16	Hamburger SV (O)	34	9	8	17	25	50	−25	35	Qualification for the relegation play-offs
17	SC Freiburg (R)	34	7	13	14	36	47	−11	34	Relegation to 2. Bundesliga
18	SC Paderborn (R)	34	7	10	17	31	65	−34	31	Relegation to 2. Bundesliga

Source: DFB
Rules for classification: 1) points; 2) goal difference; 3) number of goals scored
(O) Play-off winners; (R) Relegated

==== Results summary ====
Overall								Home						Away					
Pld	W	D	L	GF	GA	GD	Pts	W	D	L	GF	GA	GD	W	D	L	GF	GA	GD
34	7	13	14	36	47	−11	34	5	6	6	21	22	−1	2	7	8	15	25	−10

Last updated: 16 May 2015.
Source: Competitive matches

==== Results by round ====
Round	1	2	3	4	5	6	7	8	9	10	11	12	13	14	15	16	17	18	19	20	21	22	23	24	25	26	27	28	29	30	31	32	33	34
Ground	A	H	A	H	A	H	A	H	A	A	H	A	H	A	H	A	H	H	A	H	A	H	A	H	A	H	H	A	H	A	H	A	H	A
Result	L	D	L	D	D	D	D	L	L	W	W	D	L	D	D	L	D	W	L	L	W	D	L	L	L	W	W	D	L	D	L	D	W	L
Position	16	14	14	14	15	16	15	17	17	16	13	14	15	16	15	17	18	14	15	17	16	16	17	17	17	15	14	14	14	14	16	15	14	17

Updated to match(es) played on 16 May 2015. Source: Bundesliga
A = Away; H = Home; W = Win; D = Draw; L = Loss

==== Matches ====
Win Draw Loss

23 August 2014 1	Eintracht Frankfurt	1–0	SC Freiburg	Frankfurt
15:30 CEST	Seferovic 15'; Ignjovski (yellow card) 75'	Report	Schuster (yellow card) 44'; Klaus (yellow card) 64'; Günter (yellow card) 78'	Stadium: Commerzbank-Arena; Attendance: 46,200; Referee: Florian Meyer

31 August 2014 2	SC Freiburg	0–0	Borussia Mönchengladbach	Freiburg im Breisgau
17:30 CEST	Schahin (yellow card) 10'	Report	Jantschke (yellow card) 76'; Korb (yellow card) 90'	Stadium: Schwarzwald-Stadion; Attendance: 24,000; Referee: Peter Gagelmann

13 September 2014 3	Borussia Dortmund	3–1	SC Freiburg	Dortmund
15:30 CEST	Papastathopoulos (yellow card) 19'; Ramos 34'; Kagawa 41'; Aubameyang 78'	Report	Kempf (yellow card) 59'; Krmaš (yellow card) 84'; Frantz (yellow card) 85'; Zulechner (yellow card) 87'; Sorg 90'	Stadium: Westfalenstadion; Attendance: 80,200; Referee: Bastian Dankert

19 September 2014 4	SC Freiburg	2–2	Hertha BSC	Freiburg im Breisgau
20:30 CEST	Kempf 30'; Klaus 79'	Report	Ronny (yellow card) 26', (goal) 36', 90+6'; Brooks (yellow card) 51'; Stocker (yellow card) 70'; Hegeler (yellow card) 82'; Schulz (red card) 90+2'	Stadium: Schwarzwald-Stadion; Attendance: 23,600; Referee: Florian Meyer

23 September 2014 5	1899 Hoffenheim	3–3	SC Freiburg	Sinsheim
20:00 CEST	Elyounoussi 40'; Beck (yellow card) 56'; Rudy 64', (yellow card) 90'; Strobl (yellow card) 75'; Vestergaard 90+3'	Report	Frantz 32', 33'; Klaus (yellow card) 54'; Mujdža (yellow card) 56'; Schuster (yellow card) 60'; Darida 75' (pen.), (red card) 81'	Stadium: Rhein-Neckar Arena; Attendance: 24,872; Referee: Thorsten Kinhöfer

27 September 2014 6	SC Freiburg	0–0	Bayer Leverkusen	Freiburg im Breisgau
17:30 CEST	Krmaš (yellow card) 40' (yellow-red card) 78'; Schuster (yellow card) 57'; Sorg (yellow card) 90'	Report	Spahić (yellow card) 8' (yellow-red card) 28'; Çalhanoğlu (yellow card) 21'; Son (yellow card) 36'; Jedvaj (yellow card) 45+1'; Bellarabi (yellow card) 90+1'	Stadium: Schwarzwald-Stadion; Attendance: 23,500; Referee: Felix Brych

4 October 2014 7	Werder Bremen	1–1	SC Freiburg	Bremen
15:30 CEST	Di Santo 31'	Report	Darida 8' (pen.), (yellow card) 70'	Stadium: Weserstadion; Attendance: 40,029; Referee: Knut Kircher

18 October 2014 8	SC Freiburg	1–2	VfL Wolfsburg	Freiburg im Breisgau
15:30 CEST	Kerk 90+1'; Sorg (yellow card) 90+3'	Report	Caligiuri 8', 66'; Naldo (yellow card) 33'	Stadium: Schwarzwald-Stadion; Attendance: 23,500; Referee: Christian Dingert

25 October 2014 9	FC Augsburg	2–0	SC Freiburg	Augsburg
15:30 CEST	Verhaegh 11' (pen.), (yellow card) 25'; Callsen-Bracker (yellow card) 38'; Altıntop 66'; Baier (yellow card) 90+2'	Report	Krmaš (yellow card) 10'	Stadium: SGL arena Attendance: 28,324; Referee: Marco Fritz

2 November 2014 10	1. FC Köln	0–1	SC Freiburg	Cologne
17:30 CET	Vogt (yellow card) 77'	Report	Kerk (yellow card) 25'; Darida 50' (pen.), (yellow card) 72'; Bürki (yellow card) 89'	Stadium: RheinEnergieStadion; Attendance: 49,500; Referee: Peter Gagelmann

8 November 2014 11	SC Freiburg	2–0	Schalke 04	Freiburg im Breisgau
15:30 CET	Günter 22'; Freis (yellow card) 42'; Schmid 68'	Report	Aogo (yellow card) 37'; Höwedes (yellow card) 56'; Boateng (yellow card) 65'	Stadium: Schwarzwald-Stadion; Attendance: 24,000; Referee: Felix Zwayer

22 November 2014 12	Mainz 05	2–2	SC Freiburg	Mainz
15:30 CET	Díaz 27'; Bell 88'	Report	Schmid 30'; Mehmedi 58'; Klaus (yellow card) 73'	Stadium: Coface Arena; Attendance: 28,157; Referee: Daniel Siebert

28 November 2014 13	SC Freiburg	1–4	VfB Stuttgart	Freiburg im Breisgau
20:30 CET	Darida 42'; Mitrović (red card) 70'; Mehmedi (yellow card) 71'; Höfler (yellow card) 90+2'	Report	Gruezo (yellow card) 19', (goal) 52'; Harnik 31', 76'; Werner 68'	Stadium: Schwarzwald-Stadion; Attendance: 24,000; Referee: Manuel Gräfe

6 December 2014 14	SC Paderborn	1–1	SC Freiburg	Paderborn
15:30 CET	Kachunga (yellow card) 60', (goal) 89'; Sağlık (yellow card) 90'	Report	Darida 18' (pen.), (yellow card) 74'; Höfler (yellow card) 63'; Mehmedi (yellow card) 77'; Guédé (yellow card) 90+3'	Stadium: Benteler Arena; Attendance: 14,738; Referee: Peter Sippel

13 December 2014 15	SC Freiburg	0–0	Hamburger SV	Freiburg im Breisgau
15:30 CET	Torrejón (yellow card) 39'; Günter (yellow card) 53'	Report	Cléber (yellow card) 54'; Behrami (yellow card) 68'	Stadium: Schwarzwald-Stadion; Attendance: 24,000; Referee: Wolfgang Stark

16 December 2014 16	Bayern Munich	2–0	SC Freiburg	Munich
20:00 CET	Benatia (yellow card) 12'; Robben 41'; Müller 48'	Report	Schuster (yellow card) 43'	Stadium: Allianz Arena; Attendance: 71,000; Referee: Jochen Drees

21 December 2014 17	SC Freiburg	2–2	Hannover 96	Freiburg im Breisgau
17:30 CET	Riether (yellow card) 38'; Frantz 45'; Kempf (yellow card) 47', (goal) 81'; Klaus (yellow card) 52'	Report	Hirsch (yellow card) 37'; Bittencourt 83'; Kiyotake (yellow card) 84'; Albornoz (yellow card) 90+1'; Joselu 90+3'	Stadium: Schwarzwald-Stadion; Attendance: 23,550; Referee: Günter Perl

31 January 2015 18	SC Freiburg	4–1	Eintracht Frankfurt	Freiburg im Breisgau
15:30 CET	Mehmedi (yellow card) 58'; Darida 61' (pen.); Günter (yellow card) 62'; Petersen 63', 69', 88'; Philipp (yellow card) 72'	Report	Russ 1'; Trapp (yellow card) 45'; Anderson Bamba (yellow card) 45'; Chandler (yellow card) 53'	Stadium: Schwarzwald-Stadion; Attendance: 24,000; Referee: Felix Zwayer

3 February 2015 19	Borussia Mönchengladbach	1–0	SC Freiburg	Mönchengladbach
20:00 CET	Herrmann 23'; Xhaka (yellow card) 61'	Report	Sorg (yellow card) 55'; Torrejón (yellow card) 68'	Stadium: Borussia-Park; Attendance: 37,091; Referee: Markus Schmidt

7 February 2015 20	SC Freiburg	0–3	Borussia Dortmund	Freiburg im Breisgau
15:30 CET	Frantz (yellow card) 62'	Report	Reus 9'; Piszczek (yellow card) 34'; Kagawa (yellow card) 50'; Aubameyang 56', 72'	Stadium: Schwarzwald-Stadion; Attendance: 24,000; Referee: Felix Brych

15 February 2015 21	Hertha BSC	0–2	SC Freiburg	Berlin
15:30 CET	Plattenhardt (yellow card) 68'; Skjelbred (yellow card) 74'	Report	Klaus 14'; Philipp 52'; Schmid (yellow card) 77'; Bürki (yellow card) 90'	Stadium: Olympiastadion; Attendance: 37,617; Referee: Thorsten Kinhöfer

21 February 2015 22	SC Freiburg	1–1	1899 Hoffenheim	Freiburg im Breisgau
15:30 CET	Philipp (yellow card) 15'; Höhn 25'; Guédé (yellow card) 79'; Torrejón (red card) 90+2'	Report	Schwegler (yellow card) 23'; Kim (yellow card) 31'; Volland 39'; Salihović (yellow card) 61'	Stadium: Schwarzwald-Stadion; Attendance: 23,800; Referee: Peter Gagelmann

28 February 2015 23	Bayer Leverkusen	1–0	SC Freiburg	Leverkusen
15:30 CET	Toprak (yellow card) 26'; Rolfes 33'	Report	Krmaš (yellow card) 9'; Philipp (yellow card) 17'	Stadium: BayArena; Attendance: 28,624; Referee: Robert Hartmann

7 March 2015 24	SC Freiburg	0–1	Werder Bremen	Freiburg im Breisgau
15:30 CET	Schuster (yellow card) 28'; Frantz (yellow card) 60'	Report	Di Santo (yellow card) 17', (goal) 35'	Stadium: Schwarzwald-Stadion; Attendance: 24,000; Referee: Deniz Aytekin

15 March 2015 25	VfL Wolfsburg	3–0	SC Freiburg	Wolfsburg
15:30 CET	De Bruyne 19'; Rodríguez 78' (pen.); Arnold 84'	Report	Torrejón (yellow card) 18'	Stadium: Volkswagen Arena; Attendance: 26,538; Referee: Sascha Stegemann

21 March 2015 26	SC Freiburg	2–0	FC Augsburg	Freiburg im Breisgau
15:30 CET	Riether (yellow card) 65'; Schmid 71'; Petersen 84'	Report		Stadium: Schwarzwald-Stadion; Attendance: 23,700; Referee: Felix Zwayer

4 April 2015 27	SC Freiburg	1–0	1. FC Köln	Freiburg im Breisgau
15:30 CEST	Riether (yellow card) 7'; Schmid (yellow card) 34'; Frantz 37'; Krmaš (yellow card) 86'	Report	Deyverson (yellow card) 16'; Peszko (yellow card) 18'	Stadium: Schwarzwald-Stadion; Attendance: 23,800; Referee: Bastian Dankert

11 April 2015 28	Schalke 04	0–0	SC Freiburg	Gelsenkirchen
15:30 CEST	Höger (yellow card) 45+1'; Höwedes (yellow card) 58'	Report	Günter (yellow card) 33'; Klaus (yellow card) 45'; Philipp (yellow card) 87'	Stadium: Veltins-Arena; Attendance: 61,471; Referee: Jochen Drees

18 April 2015 29	SC Freiburg	2–3	Mainz 05	Freiburg im Breisgau
15:30 CEST	Mehmedi 81'; Krmaš (yellow card) 83'; Schmid 90+1'	Report	Park (yellow card) 34'; Okazaki 39', 45+1'; Mallı 83'	Stadium: Schwarzwald-Stadion; Attendance: 24,000; Referee: Sascha Stegemann

25 April 2015 30	VfB Stuttgart	2–2	SC Freiburg	Stuttgart
15:30 CEST	Baumgartl (yellow card) 7'; Ginczek 24'; Harnik 27'; Hloušek (yellow card) 58' (yellow-red card) 66'; Gentner (yellow card) 89'	Report	Mitrović (yellow card) 32'; Petersen 58' (pen.), 85'; Schuster (yellow card) 89'	Stadium: Mercedes-Benz Arena; Attendance: 58,000; Referee: Wolfgang Stark

2 May 2015 31	SC Freiburg	1–2	SC Paderborn	Freiburg im Breisgau
15:30 CEST	Petersen 40'; Schuster (yellow card) 67'	Report	Brückner (yellow card) 38'; Rupp 70', 80'; Kachunga (yellow card) 83'; Ziegler (yellow card) 89'	Stadium: Schwarzwald-Stadion; Attendance: 24,000; Referee: Manuel Gräfe

8 May 2015 32	Hamburger SV	1–1	SC Freiburg	Hamburg
20:30 CEST	Kačar 90'	Report	Mehmedi 25'; Kempf (yellow card) 86'	Stadium: Volksparkstadion; Attendance: 57,000; Referee: Knut Kircher

16 May 2015 33	SC Freiburg	2–1	Bayern Munich	Freiburg im Breisgau
15:30 CEST	Mehmedi 33'; Guédé (yellow card) 65'; Petersen 89'	Report	Schweinsteiger 13'	Stadium: Schwarzwald-Stadion; Attendance: 24,000; Referee: Tobias Welz

23 May 2015 34	Hannover 96	2–1	SC Freiburg	Hanover
15:30 CEST	Kiyotake 3'; Schmiedebach (yellow card) 14'; Briand (yellow card) 67'; Schulz (yellow card) 80'; Krmaš 84' (o.g.)	Report	Mitrović (yellow card) 68'; Petersen 90+2'; Krmaš (yellow card) 90+4'	Stadium: Niedersachsenstadion; Attendance: 49,000; Referee: Wolfgang Stark

=== DFB-Pokal ===
Win Draw Loss

17 August 2014 Round 1	Eintracht Trier	0–2	SC Freiburg	Trier
16:00 CEST	Garnier (yellow card) 21'; Zeric (yellow card) 24'; Sautner (yellow card) 27'; Hollmann (yellow card) 50'; Thelen (yellow card) 54'; Anton (yellow card) 70'; Dündar (yellow card) 90'	Report	Krmaš (yellow card) 39'; Schuster 51' (pen.); Guédé 68'	Stadium: Moselstadion; Attendance: 5,292; Referee: Robert Kampka

29 October 2014 Round 2	1860 Munich	2–5	SC Freiburg	Munich
19:00 CET	Rama 16'; Bülow (yellow card) 20'; Claasen (yellow card) 24'; Okotie 69'; Weigl (yellow card) 71'; Sánchez (yellow card) 90+1'	Report	Freis 25'; Torrejón (yellow card) 45+1'; Mehmedi 59', 64', 89'; Schmid 84'	Stadium: Allianz Arena; Attendance: 17,000; Referee: Sascha Stegemann

3 March 2015 Round of 16	SC Freiburg	2–1	1. FC Köln	Freiburg im Breisgau
20:30 CET	Ujah 17' (o.g.); Darida 18'; Mujdža (yellow card) 59'; Schahin (yellow card) 87'	Report	Maroh (yellow card) 23'; Lehmann (yellow card) 31'; Ujah (yellow card) 77'; Wimmer (yellow card) 87'; Deyverson 89'	Stadium: Schwarzwald-Stadion; Attendance: 18,800; Referee: Manuel Gräfe

7 April 2015 Quarter-finals	VfL Wolfsburg	1–0	SC Freiburg	Wolfsburg
19:00 CEST	Rodríguez 72' (pen.)	Report	Mitrović (yellow card) 60'; Schuster (yellow card) 71'; Sorg (yellow card) 77'	Stadium: Volkswagen Arena; Attendance: 15,237; Referee: Tobias Stieler
