= 2020–21 SC Freiburg season =

SC Freiburg
2020–21 season
- President: Fritz Keller
- Manager: Christian Streich
- Stadium: Schwarzwald-Stadion
- Bundesliga: 10th
- DFB-Pokal: Second round
- Top goalscorer: League: Vincenzo Grifo (9); All: Vincenzo Grifo (9)
Home colours	Away colours	Third colours

The 2020–21 season was the 122nd season in the existence of SC Freiburg and the club's fifth consecutive season in the top flight of German football. In addition to the domestic league, SC Freiburg participated in this season's edition of the DFB-Pokal. The season covered the period from 1 July 2020 to 30 June 2021.

== Players ==
=== Current squad ===
As of 11 January 2021

Note: Flags indicate national team as defined under FIFA eligibility rules; some limited exceptions apply. Players may hold more than one non-FIFA nationality.

No.	Pos.	Nation	Player
1	GK	GER	Benjamin Uphoff
3	DF	AUT	Philipp Lienhart
5	DF	GER	Manuel Gulde
7	MF	FRA	Jonathan Schmid
9	FW	GER	Lucas Höler
8	MF	FRA	Baptiste Santamaria
11	FW	BIH	Ermedin Demirović
14	MF	NED	Guus Til (on loan from Spartak Moscow)
17	DF	GER	Lukas Kübler
18	FW	GER	Nils Petersen
19	MF	GER	Janik Haberer
21	GK	GER	Florian Müller (on loan from Mainz 05)

No.	Pos.	Nation	Player
22	MF	HUN	Roland Sallai
23	DF	GER	Dominique Heintz
26	GK	NED	Mark Flekken
27	MF	GER	Nicolas Höfler
28	MF	KOR	Kwon Chang-hoon
29	MF	KOR	Jeong Woo-yeong
30	DF	GER	Christian Günter
31	DF	GER	Keven Schlotterbeck
32	MF	ITA	Vincenzo Grifo
34	MF	GER	Lino Tempelmann
36	MF	GER	Yannik Keitel
40	GK	GER	Niclas Thiede

=== Players out on loan ===
Note: Flags indicate national team as defined under FIFA eligibility rules; some limited exceptions apply. Players may hold more than one non-FIFA nationality.

No.	Pos.	Nation	Player
—	DF	GER	Nico Schlotterbeck (at Union Berlin until 30 June 2021)
—	DF	ENG	Chima Okoroji (at SC Paderborn 07 until 30 June 2021)
—	MF	GER	Patrick Kammerbauer (at Eintracht Braunschweig until 30 June 2021)
—	MF	AUS	Brandon Borrello (at Fortuna Düsseldorf until 30 June 2021)
—	MF	GER	Florian Kath (at 1. FC Magdeburg until 30 June 2021)
—	DF	GER	Gian-Luca Itter (at Greuther Fürth until 30 June 2021)
—	MF	ALB	Amir Abrashi (at FC Basel until 30 June 2021)

== Transfers ==
=== In ===
Pos	Player	Transferred from	Fee	Date	Source
FW	(Bosnia and Herzegovina) Ermedin Demirović	(Spain) Alavés	€3,700,000	5 August 2020	
GK	(Germany) Benjamin Uphoff	(Germany) Karlsruher SC	Free	5 August 2020	
MF	(Netherlands) Guus Til	(Russia) Spartak Moscow	Loan	3 September 2020	
GK	(Germany) Florian Müller	(Germany) Mainz 05	Loan	15 September 2020	
MF	(France) Baptiste Santamaria	(France) Angers	€10,000,000	17 September 2020	

=== Out ===
Pos	Player	Transferred to	Fee	Date	Source
DF	(Germany) Pascal Stenzel	(Germany) VfB Stuttgart	€1,300,000	1 July 2020	
MF	(France) Yoric Ravet	(France) Grenoble	Undisclosed	1 July 2020	
MF	(Germany) Jérôme Gondorf	(Germany) Karlsruher SC	Undisclosed	1 July 2020	
MF	(Germany) Mike Frantz	(Germany) Hannover 96	Undisclosed	22 July 2020	
DF	(England) Chima Okoroji	(Germany) SC Paderborn	Loan	28 July 2020	
DF	(Germany) Nico Schlotterbeck	(Germany) Union Berlin	Loan	31 July 2020	
GK	(Germany) Alexander Schwolow	(Germany) Hertha BSC	€8,000,000	4 August 2020	
FW	(Germany) Christoph Daferner	(Germany) Dynamo Dresden	Undisclosed	7 August 2020	
FW	(Germany) Luca Waldschmidt	(Portugal) Benfica	€15,000,000	14 August 2020	
DF	(Germany) Robin Koch	(England) Leeds United	€13,000,000	29 August 2020	
FW	(Australia) Brandon Borrello	(Germany) Fortuna Düsseldorf	Loan	1 September 2020	
DF	(Tunisia) Mohamed Dräger	(Greece) Olympiacos	€1,000,000	27 September 2020	
FW	(Germany) Marco Terrazzino		Contract termination	5 October 2020	
MF	(Germany) Florian Kath	(Germany) 1. FC Magdeburg	Loan	5 October 2020	
GK	(Germany) Constantin Frommann		Contract termination	6 October 2020	
DF	(Germany) Gian-Luca Itter	(Germany) Greuther Fürth	Loan	11 January 2021	
MF	(Albania) Amir Abrashi	(Switzerland) FC Basel	Loan	27 January 2021	

== Pre-season and friendlies ==
Win Draw Loss

15 August 2020 Friendly	SC Freiburg (Germany)	1–1	(Germany) Karlsruher SC	Freiburg, Germany
16:30 CEST (UTC+2)				Stadium: Schwarzwald-Stadion

22 August 2020 Friendly	Dornbirn (Austria)	1–8	(Germany) SC Freiburg	Tschagguns, Austria
14:30 CEST (UTC+2)	5'		Grifo 31', 60' (pen.); Demirović 76', 107'; Keitel 97'; Lienhart 105'; Weißhaupt 118'; Petersen 120'	Stadium: Aktivpark Montafon
Note: Match was played in two 60-minute halves.

29 August 2020 Friendly	St. Gallen (Switzerland)	3–1	(Germany) SC Freiburg	St. Gallen, Switzerland
14:30 CEST (UTC+2)				Stadium: Kybunpark

6 September 2020 Friendly	SC Freiburg (Germany)	4–1	(Poland) Górnik Zabrze	Freiburg, Germany
16:30 CEST (UTC+2)				Stadium: Schwarzwald-Stadion

6 September 2020 Friendly	SC Freiburg (Germany)	1–1	(Germany) SV Sandhausen	Freiburg, Germany
18:30 CEST (UTC+2)				Stadium: Schwarzwald-Stadion

8 October 2020 Friendly	SC Freiburg (Germany)	0–3	(Germany) VfB Stuttgart	Freiburg, Germany
14:00 CEST (UTC+2)		Report	Castro 6' (pen.); Coulibaly 62', 83'	Stadium: Schwarzwald-Stadion

25 March 2021 Friendly	SC Freiburg (Germany)	2–0	(Switzerland) Basel	Freiburg, Germany
14:00 CET (UTC+1)	Til 15'; Schmid 84'	Report		Stadium: Schwarzwald-Stadion; Referee: Matthias Jöllenbeck

== Competitions ==
=== Overview ===
Competition	First match	Last match	Starting round	Final position	Record							
Competition	First match	Last match	Starting round	Final position	Pld	W	D	L	GF	GA	GD	Win %
Bundesliga	19 September 2020	22 May 2021	Matchday 1	10th	34	12	9	13	52	52	+0	35.29
DFB-Pokal	13 September 2020	23 December 2020	First round	Second round	2	1	0	1	2	2	+0	50.00
Total					36	13	9	14	54	54	+0	36.11

Last updated: 22 May 2021
Source: Soccerway

=== Bundesliga ===
==== League table ====
Pos	Team	Pld	W	D	L	GF	GA	GD	Pts
8	Borussia Mönchengladbach	34	13	10	11	64	56	+8	49
9	VfB Stuttgart	34	12	9	13	56	55	+1	45
10	SC Freiburg	34	12	9	13	52	52	0	45
11	1899 Hoffenheim	34	11	10	13	52	54	−2	43
12	Mainz 05	34	10	9	15	39	56	−17	39

Source: DFB
Rules for classification: 1) Points; 2) Goal difference; 3) Goals scored; 4) Head-to-head results; 5) Head-to-head away goals scored; 6) Away goals scored; 7) Play-off.

==== Results summary ====
Overall								Home						Away					
Pld	W	D	L	GF	GA	GD	Pts	W	D	L	GF	GA	GD	W	D	L	GF	GA	GD
34	12	9	13	52	52	0	45	7	6	4	33	23	+10	5	3	9	19	29	−10

Last updated: 22 May 2021.
Source: DFB

==== Results by round ====
Round	1	2	3	4	5	6	7	8	9	10	11	12	13	14	15	16	17	18	19	20	21	22	23	24	25	26	27	28	29	30	31	32	33	34
Ground	A	H	A	H	A	H	A	H	A	H	H	A	H	A	H	A	H	H	A	H	A	H	A	H	A	H	A	A	H	A	H	A	H	A
Result	W	D	L	D	D	L	L	L	D	D	W	W	W	W	W	L	D	W	L	W	D	L	W	L	L	W	L	L	W	L	D	W	D	L
Position	6	5	12	12	13	13	14	14	14	14	14	11	10	9	8	9	9	9	9	8	8	9	8	8	9	8	10	10	9	9	9	9	10	10

Updated to match(es) played on 22 May 2021. Source: DFB
A = Away; H = Home; W = Win; D = Draw; L = Loss

==== Matches ====
The league fixtures were announced on 7 August 2020.

19 September 2020 1	VfB Stuttgart	2–3	SC Freiburg	Stuttgart
15:30 CEST (UTC+2)	Didavi (yellow card) 25'; Silas (yellow card) 44', (goal) 81'; Kalajdžić 71'	Report	Petersen 8'; Sallai 26'; Höler (yellow card) 35'; Grifo 48'; Kübler (yellow card) 90+6'	Stadium: Mercedes-Benz Arena; Attendance: 7,123; Referee: Benjamin Cortus

27 September 2020 2	SC Freiburg	1–1	VfL Wolfsburg	Freiburg
18:00 CEST (UTC+2)	Petersen 11'	Report	Paulo Otávio (yellow card) 32'; Arnold (yellow card) 34'; Brooks (yellow card) 34'; Brekalo 42'	Stadium: Schwarzwald-Stadion; Attendance: 3,200; Referee: Sören Storks

3 October 2020 3	Borussia Dortmund	4–0	SC Freiburg	Dortmund
15:30 CEST (UTC+2)	Haaland 31', 66'; Can 47'; Hummels (yellow card) 55'; Passlack 90+2'	Report	Kwon (yellow card) 57'	Stadium: Signal Iduna Park; Attendance: 11,500; Referee: Guido Winkmann

17 October 2020 4	SC Freiburg	1–1	Werder Bremen	Freiburg
15:30 CEST (UTC+2)	Lienhart 16'; Höfler (yellow card) 27'; Santamaria (yellow card) 89'; Schmid (yellow card) 90+2'	Report	Füllkrug 25' (pen.); Augustinsson (yellow card) 44'; Mbom (yellow card) 51'; Sargent (yellow card) 83'	Stadium: Schwarzwald-Stadion; Attendance: 0 Referee: Christian Dingert

24 October 2020 5	Union Berlin	1–1	SC Freiburg	Berlin
15:30 CEST (UTC+2)	Andrich 36'; Ingvartsen (yellow card) 39'	Report	Grifo 34'; Tempelmann (yellow card) 69'; Sallai (yellow card) 77'; Lienhart (yellow card) 80'; Höfler (yellow card) 88'	Stadium: Stadion An der Alten Försterei; Attendance: 4,500; Referee: Robert Schröder

1 November 2020 6	SC Freiburg	2–4	Bayer Leverkusen	Freiburg
15:30 CET (UTC+1)	Höler 3'; Kübler (yellow card) 45+1'; Heintz (yellow card) 50'; Petersen 72'	Report	S. Bender (yellow card) 24'; Alario 29', 42'; Diaby (yellow card) 60'; Amiri 64'; Tah 76'	Stadium: Schwarzwald-Stadion; Attendance: 0 Referee: Benjamin Cortus

7 November 2020 7	RB Leipzig	3–0	SC Freiburg	Leipzig
15:30 CET (UTC+1)	Konaté 26'; Orbán (yellow card) 28'; Henrichs (yellow card) 62'; Sabitzer 70' (pen.); Angeliño 89'	Report	Lienhart (yellow card) 25'; Gulde (yellow card) 44'; Tempelmann (yellow card) 90+1'	Stadium: Red Bull Arena; Attendance: 0 Referee: Felix Zwayer

22 November 2020 8	SC Freiburg	1–3	Mainz 05	Freiburg
15:30 CET (UTC+1)	Petersen 63'	Report	Mateta 2', 34', 40'; Niakhaté (yellow card) 67'	Stadium: Schwarzwald-Stadion; Attendance: 0 Referee: Martin Petersen

28 November 2020 9	FC Augsburg	1–1	SC Freiburg	Augsburg
15:30 CET (UTC+1)	Caligiuri (yellow card) 20'; Gumny (yellow card) 24'; Uduokhai (yellow card) 67'; Vargas 80'	Report	Demirović (yellow card) 7'; Grifo 64'	Stadium: WWK Arena; Attendance: 0 Referee: Robert Schröder

5 December 2020 10	SC Freiburg	2–2	Borussia Mönchengladbach	Freiburg
15:30 CET (UTC+1)	Schlotterbeck (yellow card) 25'; Lienhart 32'; Grifo 49' (pen.)	Report	Embolo 23'; Neuhaus (yellow card) 45+1'; Pléa 50', (yellow card) 76'	Stadium: Schwarzwald-Stadion; Attendance: 0 Referee: Tobias Stieler

12 December 2020 11	SC Freiburg	2–0	Arminia Bielefeld	Freiburg
15:30 CET (UTC+1)	Höler (yellow card) 26'; Höfler (yellow card) 66'; Grifo 79' (pen.), (yellow card) 80'; Jeong 90+2'	Report		Stadium: Schwarzwald-Stadion; Attendance: 0 Referee: Harm Osmers

16 December 2020 12	Schalke 04	0–2	SC Freiburg	Gelsenkirchen
18:30 CET (UTC+1)	Raman (yellow card) 19'; Serdar (yellow card) 83'	Report	Santamaria (yellow card) 36'; Sallai 50', 68'	Stadium: Veltins-Arena; Attendance: 0 Referee: Sven Jablonski

20 December 2020 13	SC Freiburg	4–1	Hertha BSC	Freiburg
15:30 CET (UTC+1)	Grifo 7'; Demirović 59'; Gulde 67'; Petersen 90+4' (pen.)	Report	Lukebakio 52'	Stadium: Schwarzwald-Stadion; Attendance: 0 Referee: Tobias Reichel

2 January 2021 14	1899 Hoffenheim	1–3	SC Freiburg	Sinsheim
15:30 CET (UTC+1)	Akpoguma (yellow card) 16'; Bebou 58'; Vogt (yellow card) 82'	Report	Santamaria 7'; Kwon (yellow card) 24'; Grifo 34' (pen.); Höfler (yellow card) 36'; Kasim 42' (o.g.)	Stadium: Rhein-Neckar-Arena; Attendance: 0 Referee: Robert Hartmann

9 January 2021 15	SC Freiburg	5–0	1. FC Köln	Freiburg
15:30 CET (UTC+1)	Demirović 18'; Höfler 39'; Sallai 59'; Lienhart 69'; Höler 79'	Report		Stadium: Schwarzwald-Stadion; Attendance: 0 Referee: Robert Schröder

17 January 2021 16	Bayern Munich	2–1	SC Freiburg	Munich
15:30 CET (UTC+1)	Lewandowski 7'; Müller 75'; Choupo-Moting (yellow card) 90'	Report	Höfler (yellow card) 9'; Sallai (yellow card) 46'; Petersen 62'	Stadium: Allianz Arena; Attendance: 0 Referee: Christian Dingert

20 January 2021 17	SC Freiburg	2–2	Eintracht Frankfurt	Freiburg
20:30 CET (UTC+1)	Sallai 32'; Höler (yellow card) 53'; Petersen 63'; Demirović (yellow card) 65'; Gulde (yellow card) 90+1'	Report	Younes 6'; Barkok (yellow card) 40'; Tuta (yellow card) 65'; Schlotterbeck 75' (o.g.); Jović (yellow card) 90+1'	Stadium: Schwarzwald-Stadion; Attendance: 0 Referee: Guido Winkmann

23 January 2021 18	SC Freiburg	2–1	VfB Stuttgart	Freiburg
15:30 CET (UTC+1)	Demirović 14'; Jeong 37'; Keitel (yellow card) 66'; Schmid (yellow card) 74'	Report	Silas 7'; González (penalty missed) 45'	Stadium: Schwarzwald-Stadion; Attendance: 0 Referee: Tobias Stieler

31 January 2021 19	VfL Wolfsburg	3–0	SC Freiburg	Wolfsburg
18:00 CET (UTC+1)	Brooks 21'; Weghorst 39'; Gerhardt 86'	Report		Stadium: Volkswagen Arena; Attendance: 0 Referee: Tobias Reichel

6 February 2021 20	SC Freiburg	2–1	Borussia Dortmund	Freiburg
15:30 CET (UTC+1)	Jeong 49'; Schmid 52'; Haberer (yellow card) 90+4'	Report	Moukoko 76'; Bellingham (yellow card) 78'; Akanji (yellow card) 90+2'	Stadium: Schwarzwald-Stadion; Attendance: 0 Referee: Felix Brych

13 February 2021 21	Werder Bremen	0–0	SC Freiburg	Bremen
15:30 CET (UTC+1)		Report	Höfler (yellow card) 83'; Heintz (yellow card) 90+1'	Stadium: Weser-Stadion; Attendance: 0 Referee: Manuel Gräfe

20 February 2021 22	SC Freiburg	0–1	Union Berlin	Freiburg
15:30 CET (UTC+1)	Grifo (yellow card) 37'; Höler (yellow card) 50'	Report	Lenz (yellow card) 39'; Prömel 64'; Gießelmann (yellow card) 85'	Stadium: Schwarzwald-Stadion; Attendance: 0 Referee: Sören Storks

28 February 2021 23	Bayer Leverkusen	1–2	SC Freiburg	Leverkusen
18:00 CET (UTC+1)	Aránguiz (yellow card) 68'; Bailey 70', (yellow card) 71'	Report	Demirović (yellow card) 21', (goal) 50'; Höler 61'; Höfler (yellow card) 73'; Sallai (yellow card) 77'	Stadium: BayArena; Attendance: 0 Referee: Felix Zwayer

6 March 2021 24	SC Freiburg	0–3	RB Leipzig	Freiburg
15:30 CET (UTC+1)	Höfler (yellow card) 52'	Report	Nkunku 41'; Sørloth 64'; Hwang (yellow card) 75'; Forsberg 79'	Stadium: Schwarzwald-Stadion; Attendance: 0 Referee: Guido Winkmann

13 March 2021 25	Mainz 05	1–0	SC Freiburg	Mainz
15:30 CET (UTC+1)	Bell (yellow card) 68'; Quaison 84'	Report	Höfler (yellow card) 21'; Schlotterbeck (yellow card) 33'; Schmid (yellow card) 90+4'	Stadium: Opel Arena; Attendance: 0 Referee: Benjamin Cortus

21 March 2021 26	SC Freiburg	2–0	FC Augsburg	Freiburg
18:00 CET (UTC+1)	Lienhart (yellow card) 23', (goal) 79'; Gulde (yellow card) 29'; Santamaria (yellow card) 45+1'; Til (yellow card) 46'; Sallai 51'; Höfler (yellow card) 74'; Günter (yellow card) 76'; Demirović (yellow card) 90+4'	Report	Uduokhai (yellow card) 15'; Gouweleeuw (yellow card) 84'	Stadium: Schwarzwald-Stadion; Attendance: 0 Referee: Bastian Dankert

3 April 2021 27	Borussia Mönchengladbach	2–1	SC Freiburg	Mönchengladbach
20:30 CEST (UTC+2)	Thuram 53', 60'; Kramer (yellow card) 80'	Report	Sallai 10'; Demirović (yellow card) 31'; Höler (yellow card) 64'; Günter (yellow card) 81'	Stadium: Borussia-Park; Attendance: 0 Referee: Christian Dingert

9 April 2021 28	Arminia Bielefeld	1–0	SC Freiburg	Bielefeld
20:30 CEST (UTC+2)	Klos (yellow card) 56'; Voglsammer (yellow card) 58'; Santamaria 68' (o.g.); De Medina (yellow card) 90+3'	Report	Santamaria (yellow card) 56'; Schmid (yellow card) 85'	Stadium: Bielefelder Alm; Attendance: 0 Referee: Martin Petersen

17 April 2021 29	SC Freiburg	4–0	Schalke 04	Freiburg
15:30 CEST (UTC+2)	Höler 7'; Santamaria (yellow card) 9'; Sallai 22' (pen.); Heintz (yellow card) 29'; Günter 50', 74'	Report	Huntelaar (yellow card) 21'	Stadium: Schwarzwald-Stadion; Attendance: 0 Referee: Tobias Reichel

24 April 2021 31	SC Freiburg	1–1	1899 Hoffenheim	Freiburg
15:30 CEST (UTC+2)	Schlotterbeck (yellow card) 50'; Grifo 81' (pen.)	Report	Kramarić 40'; Bebou (yellow card) 48'; Samassékou (yellow card) 59'	Stadium: Schwarzwald-Stadion; Attendance: 0 Referee: Manuel Gräfe

6 May 2021 30	Hertha BSC	3–0	SC Freiburg	Berlin
18:30 CEST (UTC+2)	Piątek 13'; Alderete (yellow card) 20'; Pekarík 22'; Guendouzi (yellow card) 38'; Torunarigha (yellow card) 64'; Darida (yellow card) 69'; Radonjić 85'	Report	Höfler (yellow card) 36'; Demirović (yellow card) 42'; Sallai (yellow card) 80'	Stadium: Olympiastadion; Attendance: 0 Referee: Benjamin Cortus
Note: The match was originally scheduled for 21 April 2021, but was postponed after more than ten Hertha players and staff tested positive for COVID-19.

9 May 2021 32	1. FC Köln	1–4	SC Freiburg	Cologne
13:30 CEST (UTC+2)	Wolf (yellow card) 37'; Andersson (yellow card) 47', (goal) 50'; Duda (penalty missed) 62'	Report	Petersen 18'; Demirović 20', (yellow card) 41'; Lienhart (yellow card) 81'; Grifo 90+3'; Schmid 90+6'	Stadium: RheinEnergieStadion; Attendance: 0 Referee: Marco Fritz

15 May 2021 33	SC Freiburg	2–2	Bayern Munich	Freiburg
15:30 CEST (UTC+2)	Sallai (yellow card) 17'; Gulde 29'; Günter 81'	Report	Lewandowski 26' (pen.); Sané 53'; Davies (yellow card) 87'; Alaba (yellow card) 90'	Stadium: Schwarzwald-Stadion; Attendance: 0 Referee: Florian Badstübner

22 May 2021 34	Eintracht Frankfurt	3–1	SC Freiburg	Frankfurt
15:30 CEST (UTC+2)	Hrustic (yellow card) 36'; Silva 62' (pen.); Touré 87'; Ache 90+2'	Report	Jeong 77'	Stadium: Deutsche Bank Park; Attendance: 0 Referee: Christian Dingert

=== DFB-Pokal ===
13 September 2020 First round	Waldhof Mannheim	1–2	SC Freiburg	Mannheim
18:30 CEST (UTC+2)	Martinović 56'; Ferati (yellow card) 90+4'	Report	Kwon 19'; Schmid 79'; Günter (yellow card) 90+1'	Stadium: Carl-Benz-Stadion; Attendance: 460; Referee: Markus Schmidt

23 December 2020 Second round	VfB Stuttgart	1–0	SC Freiburg	Stuttgart
18:30 CET (UTC+1)	Kalajdžić 15'; Stenzel (yellow card) 44'; Klimowicz (yellow card) 55'	Report	Grifo (yellow card) 44'	Stadium: Mercedes-Benz Arena; Attendance: 0 Referee: Felix Brych

== Statistics ==
=== Appearances and goals ===
No.	Pos	Nat	Player	Total		Bundesliga		DFB-Pokal	
No.	Pos	Nat	Player	Apps	Goals	Apps	Goals	Apps	Goals
Goalkeepers
1	GK	(Germany) GER	Benjamin Uphoff	2	0	0	0	2	0
21	GK	(Germany) GER	Florian Müller	31	0	31	0	0	0
26	GK	(Netherlands) NED	Mark Flekken	3	0	3	0	0	0
40	GK	(Germany) GER	Niclas Thiede	0	0	0	0	0	0
Defenders
3	DF	(Austria) AUT	Philipp Lienhart	36	4	34	4	2	0
5	DF	(Germany) GER	Manuel Gulde	27	2	22+5	2	0	0
17	DF	(Germany) GER	Lukas Kübler	20	0	11+8	0	0+1	0
23	DF	(Germany) GER	Dominique Heintz	23	0	14+7	0	2	0
30	DF	(Germany) GER	Christian Günter	36	3	34	3	2	0
31	DF	(Germany) GER	Keven Schlotterbeck	25	0	18+6	0	1	0
Midfielders
7	MF	(France) FRA	Jonathan Schmid	33	3	27+4	2	2	1
8	MF	(France) FRA	Baptiste Santamaria	31	1	28+2	1	1	0
14	MF	(Netherlands) NED	Guus Til	7	0	1+6	0	0	0
19	MF	(Germany) GER	Janik Haberer	14	0	5+9	0	0	0
22	MF	(Hungary) HUN	Roland Sallai	29	8	22+6	8	0+1	0
27	MF	(Germany) GER	Nicolas Höfler	33	1	30+1	1	2	0
28	MF	(South Korea) KOR	Kwon Chang-hoon	14	1	1+11	0	1+1	1
29	MF	(South Korea) KOR	Jeong Woo-yeong	28	4	7+19	4	2	0
32	MF	(Italy) ITA	Vincenzo Grifo	33	9	27+4	9	2	0
34	MF	(Germany) GER	Lino Tempelmann	11	0	2+8	0	0+1	0
36	MF	(Germany) GER	Yannik Keitel	13	0	4+8	0	1	0
39	MF	(Germany) GER	Carlo Boukhalfa	1	0	0	0	0+1	0
Forwards
9	FW	(Germany) GER	Lucas Höler	35	4	22+11	4	1+1	0
11	FW	(Bosnia and Herzegovina) BIH	Ermedin Demirović	32	5	19+11	5	0+2	0
18	FW	(Germany) GER	Nils Petersen	34	8	12+20	8	1+1	0
45	FW	(Switzerland) SUI	Nishan Burkart	1	0	0+1	0	0	0
Players transferred out during the season
6	MF	(Albania) ALB	Amir Abrashi	5	0	0+5	0	0	0
13	FW	(Germany) GER	Marco Terrazzino	0	0	0	0	0	0
20	DF	(Tunisia) TUN	Mohamed Dräger	0	0	0	0	0	0
24	DF	(Germany) GER	Gian-Luca Itter	0	0	0	0	0	0
38	MF	(Germany) GER	Florian Kath	0	0	0	0	0	0
46	GK	(Germany) GER	Constantin Frommann	0	0	0	0	0	0

Last updated: 22 May 2021
Source: Competitions

=== Goalscorers ===
Rank	Pos	No.	Nat	Name	Bundesliga	DFB-Pokal	Total
1	MF	32	(Italy)	Vincenzo Grifo	9	0	9
2	FW	18	(Germany)	Nils Petersen	8	0	8
2	MF	22	(Hungary)	Roland Sallai	8	0	8
4	FW	11	(Bosnia and Herzegovina)	Ermedin Demirović	5	0	5
5	DF	3	(Austria)	Philipp Lienhart	4	0	4
5	FW	9	(Germany)	Lucas Höler	4	0	4
5	MF	29	(South Korea)	Jeong Woo-yeong	4	0	4
8	MF	7	(France)	Jonathan Schmid	2	1	3
8	DF	30	(Germany)	Christian Günter	3	0	3
10	DF	5	(Germany)	Manuel Gulde	2	0	2
11	MF	8	(France)	Baptiste Santamaria	1	0	1
11	MF	27	(Germany)	Nicolas Höfler	1	0	1
11	MF	28	(South Korea)	Kwon Chang-hoon	0	1	1
Own goals					1	0	1
Totals					52	2	54

Last updated: 22 May 2021
