= Marc Torrejón =

Spanish footballer

Personal information
- Full name: Marc Torrejón Moya
- Date of birth: 18 February 1986 (age 40)
- Place of birth: Barcelona, Spain
- Height: 1.87 m (6 ft 2 in)
- Position: Centre-back

Youth career
- 2002–2005: Espanyol

Senior career*
Years	Team	Apps	(Gls)
2003–2005	Espanyol B	2	(0)
2005–2009	Espanyol	71	(1)
2005–2006	→ Málaga B (loan)	35	(0)
2009–2012	Racing Santander	92	(3)
2012–2014	1. FC Kaiserslautern	54	(1)
2014–2017	SC Freiburg	51	(1)
2017–2019	Union Berlin	24	(0)
Total		329	(6)

International career
2004–2005	Spain U19	3	(0)
2007–2009	Spain U21	11	(1)
- * Club domestic league appearances and goals

Marc Torrejón Moya (born 18 February 1986) is a Spanish former professional footballer who played as a central defender.

== Club career ==
=== Spain ===
Born in Barcelona, Catalonia, Torrejón was a product of hometown RCD Espanyol's youth ranks. He spent the 2005–06 season on loan to Málaga CF's reserves in the Segunda División and, upon returning to Espanyol, became a defensive centerpiece alongside another club trainee, Daniel Jarque. His La Liga debut came on 1 October 2006, in a 0–0 away draw against CA Osasuna.

Torrejón appeared in ten UEFA Cup games in the 2006–07 campaign, as the Pericos went all the way to the final. There, he missed the decisive shot in a 3–1 penalty shootout loss to Sevilla FC.

The following season, Torrejón scored his first professional goal, in a 2–1 defeat at Real Valladolid on 20 January 2008. In 2008–09, he played almost no part in the team due to the signing of Argentine Nicolás Pareja.

On 17 July 2009, Torrejón signed a four-year contract with Racing de Santander for €1,6 million. He was arguably the most solid defender for the Cantabrians in his first year, only being booked four times in the league, although the side barely escaped relegation.

=== Germany ===
Torrejón left Racing at the end of 2011–12, which ended in relegation. On 26 August 2012, he joined German club 1. FC Kaiserslautern on a three-year contract. He made his league debut against MSV Duisburg on 16 September, playing the full 90 minutes in the home 2–1 win, and scored his first goal in the 2. Bundesliga on 5 May, in a 4–1 home victory over FSV Frankfurt.

On 27 August 2014, Torrejón moved to the Bundesliga after signing with SC Freiburg for an undisclosed fee. He made his first appearance in the German top flight exactly one month later, as an 80th-minute substitute for Jonathan Schmid in a goalless home draw with Bayer 04 Leverkusen.

Torrejón retired at the age of 33, after two years in the second tier with 1. FC Union Berlin where he dealt with recurrent injuries.

== International career ==
Torrejón won 14 caps for Spain at youth level. He participated at the 2009 UEFA European Championship with the under-21 team, scoring in the 2–0 group stage win over Finland.

== Personal life ==
Torrejón's sister, Marta, is also a footballer. She also played for Espanyol (spending time with FC Barcelona as well), and represented the Spain national team.
