= Roland Sallai =

Hungarian footballer (born 1997)

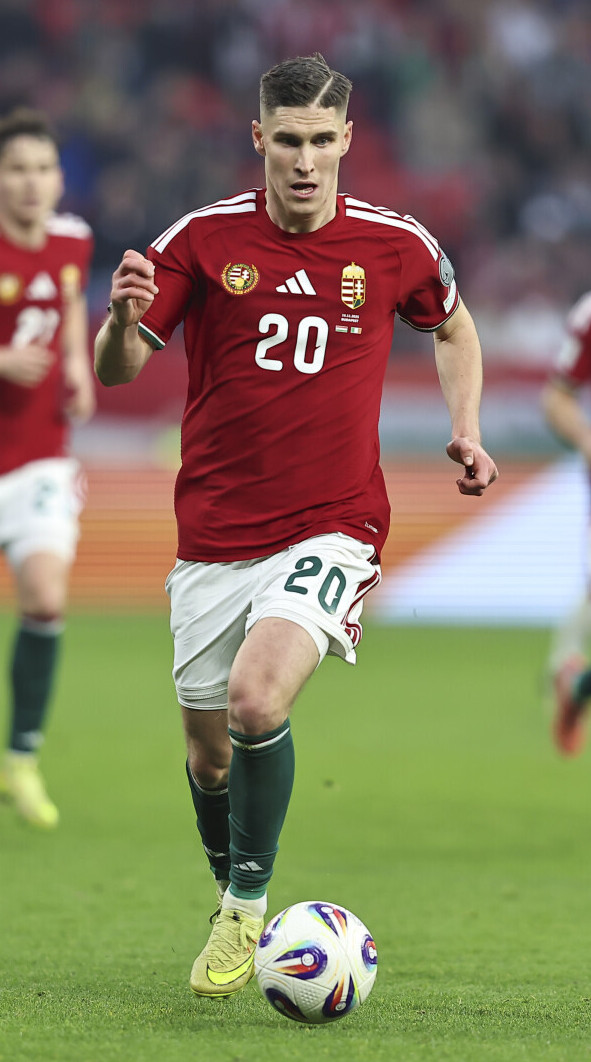
- Sallai playing for Hungary in 2025

Personal information
- Full name: Roland Sallai
- Date of birth: 22 May 1997 (age 29)
- Place of birth: Budapest, Hungary
- Height: 1.83 m (6 ft 0 in)
- Position: Right-back

Team information
- Current team: Galatasaray
- Number: 7

Youth career
- 2003–2007: Debreceni Olasz Focisuli
- 2007–2009: Siófok
- 2009–2014: Videoton

Senior career*
Years	Team	Apps	(Gls)
2014–2017	Puskás Akadémia	48	(3)
2016–2017	→ Palermo (loan)	21	(1)
2017–2018	APOEL	29	(9)
2018–2024	SC Freiburg	138	(20)
2024–	Galatasaray	59	(4)

International career^{‡}
2015	Hungary U18	3	(1)
2015	Hungary U19	1	(0)
2015	Hungary U20	4	(1)
2015–2016	Hungary U21	8	(1)
2016–	Hungary	68	(15)
- * Club domestic league appearances and goals as of 23:54, 21 August 2026 (UTC) ‡ National team caps and goals as of 19:51, 14 November 2026 (UTC)

Roland Sallai (Hungarian pronunciation: [ˈrolɒnd ˈʃɒllɒi]; born 22 May 1997) is a Hungarian professional footballer who plays as a right-back for Süper Lig club Galatasaray and the Hungary national team.

== Club career ==
=== Puskás Akadémia ===
Sallai started his professional career at Puskás Akadémia where he played from 2014 until the summer of 2017. He scored twice against Panathinaikos F.C. in the group match of the 2014 Puskás Cup. He made his debut on 1 August 2014 against Pécs, and scored first goal in Hungarian league against Ferencváros on 14 September 2014 in Groupama Aréna.

=== Palermo ===
On 4 August 2016, Sallai joined Italian club Palermo on a seasonal loan, until the end of the 2016–17 season with a loan fee of $300,000. Sallai completed 84 minutes on his debut for Serie A's club on 10 September 2016 against Napoli. He scored his first official goal for Palermo on 19 March 2017 against Udinese. He appeared in 21 Serie A matches (eleven in the starting line-up, ten as a substitute) and scored one goal.

=== APOEL ===
On 5 August 2017, it was announced that APOEL had secured his signature on a four-year contract until the end of May 2021, for an undisclosed transfer fee from Puskás, rumored to be around €2 million. On 9 September, he made his debut and scored his first goal against Nea Salamina. He appeared in 29 Cypriot First Division matches and scored 9 goals.

He also appeared in six UEFA Champions League matches against Real Madrid, Borussia Dortmund and Tottenham Hotspur.

=== SC Freiburg ===
On 31 August 2018, Sallai signed a four-year deal with Bundesliga club, SC Freiburg for a fee reported to be €4.5 million. On 22 September 2018 he scored and won a penalty on his debut against Wolfsburg at Volkswagen Arena on the 4th match day of the 2018–19 Bundesliga in a 3–1 victory, and he was named in the team of the week following his performance. From middle of November 2018 he had adductor problems, and was unable to play for the next five months. He returned as a substitute on 5 May 2019 against Fortuna Düsseldorf.

Sallai started his third season at the Freiburg with a goal and an assist against VfB Stuttgart in a 3–2 victory. He scored two goals against Schalke 04 in 2–0 victory in Veltins-Arena and was named in the team of the 12th match day by sports magazine kicker.

==== 2022–23 season ====
On 16 April 2022, he scored twice against VfL Bochum at the Europa-Park Stadion on the 30th game week in the 2021–22 Bundesliga season. Both assist were prepared by Jeong Woo-yeong. He was also voted for the best player of Game Week 30 by Kicker.

In the 2022–23 Bundesliga season, he scored only one goal against SV Werder Bremen at the Weserstadion, Bremen on the 28th game week. Compared to his previous seasons, he only made 19 appearances in the Bundesliga, while four appearances in the domestic cup.

==== 2023–24 season ====
On 19 August 2023, he scored his first goal in a 2–1 victory against TSG 1899 Hoffenheim on the first match day of the 2023–24 Bundesliga season. According to Kicker, he became the best player of Freiburg from a troublemaker. In an interview with Nemzeti Sport, he said that a Saudi club, Al-Ettifaq FC managed by Steven Gerrard, offered him "a lot of money to sign him", however, he chose to remain in Germany. On 21 September 2023, he scored his first goal in a 3–2 victory against Olympiacos F.C. in the 2023–24 UEFA Europa League season. On 5 October 2023, he scored the only Freiburg goal in a 2–1 defeat against West Ham United F.C. in the Europa League. On 26 October 2023, he got injured in the third round of the 2023–24 UEFA Europa League group stage match against FK TSC. On 30 November 2023, he returned from his injury in a 2023–24 UEFA Europa League match against Olympiacos F.C. He scored his first goal in the 95th minute in a 2–0 home victory against 1. FC Köln on the 15th match day of the 2023–24 Bundesliga season after his two-month break due to his injury.

On 20 January 2024, he scored the winning goal in the 85th minute in a 3–2 victory over TSG 1899 Hoffenheim on the 18th game week of the 2023–24 Bundesliga season.

On 22 February 2024, he scored two goals in a 3–2 victory over RC Lens in the second leg of the 16th finals of the 2023–24 UEFA Europa League.

=== Galatasaray ===
==== 2024–25 season ====
On 13 September 2024, he signed with the Turkish Süper Lig club Galatasaray on a 4-year contract. On 21 September 2024, he made his league debut for Galatasaray against rivals Fenerbahçe. He entered the pitch as a substitute for Dries Mertens in the 75th minute. On 1 December 2024, he scored his first goal in a 2–2 draw against Eyüpspor.

==== 2025–26 season ====
He scored his first goal in the 2025–26 Süper Lig season in a 4–1 victory over Antalyaspor at the Antalya Stadium in Antalaya on 13 December 2025.

== International career ==
Sallai was part of the Hungarian U-20 team at the 2015 FIFA U-20 World Cup, playing in two games. He made his debut for U-21 team against Italy U21 on 12 August 2015.

He made his full international debut on 20 May 2016 in a friendly match against Ivory Coast at the Groupama Arena, Budapest, Hungary. On 5 May 2016, Sallai was named in Hungary's preliminary Euro 2016 squad, but was left off of final squad for the tournament. On 11 September 2018, he scored his first goal for the national team against Greece at the Groupama Arena, Budapest, in a 2018–19 UEFA Nations League C match.

On 1 June 2021, Sallai was included in the final 26-man squad to represent Hungary at the rescheduled UEFA Euro 2020 tournament. On 14 June 2022, he scored a brace in a 4–0 away win over England in the 2022–23 UEFA Nations League A, to be England's worst home defeat since the Wembley Wizards match in 1928. He scored the first goal in a 2–1 victory against Greece on 20 November 2022. The match was also the farewell of Balázs Dzsudzsák.

On 20 June 2023, he scored his 10th international goal, by netting the second goal in a 2–0 win against Lithuania in the 83rd minute at the Puskás Aréna in the UEFA Euro 2024 qualifying Group G. On 14 October 2023, he scored the second Hungarian goal in a 2–1 victory over Serbia at the Puskás Aréna in the UEFA Euro 2024 qualifying match.

On 14 May 2024, Sallai was named in Hungary's squad for UEFA Euro 2024. He started all three Group A matches, assisting Kevin Csoboth's 100th-minute winning goal against Scotland in the final group match on 24 June. On 11 October 2024, he scored the first goal in a 1–1 draw against the Netherlands in the 2024–25 UEFA Nations League A match at the Puskás Aréna. The assist was performed by Zsolt Nagy. After the match, he said that the team found themselves again.

On 6 September 2025, he scored a goal in a 2–2 draw against Ireland in the 2026 FIFA World Cup qualification at the Aviva Stadium in Dublin, Ireland. However, later in the game he was sent off. After the match, his teammate Dominik Szoboszlai said that he has to defend Sallai by saying "he would never do such a thing on purpose".

== Personal life ==
His father, Tibor, was also a professional football player.

Sallai's uncle is former Hungarian national team defender Sándor Sallai.

== Career statistics ==
=== Club ===
As of match played 17 May 2026

Appearances and goals by club, season and competition
Club	Season	League			National cup (Note: Includes Magyar Kupa, Coppa Italia, Cypriot Cup, DFB-Pokal, Turkish Cup)		League cup (Note: Includes Ligakupa)		Europe		Other		Total	
Club	Season	Division	Apps	Goals	Apps	Goals	Apps	Goals	Apps	Goals	Apps	Goals	Apps	Goals
Puskás Akadémia	2013–14	NB I	0	0	0	0	1	0	—		—		1	0
Puskás Akadémia	2014–15	NB I	16	2	3	0	3	1	—		—		22	3
Puskás Akadémia	2015–16	NB I	31	1	1	0	0	0	—		—		32	1
Puskás Akadémia	2017–18	NB I	1	0	0	0	0	0	—		—		1	0
Puskás Akadémia	Total		48	3	4	0	4	1	—		—		56	4
Palermo (loan)	2016–17	Serie A	21	1	1	0	—		—		—		22	1
APOEL	2017–18	Cypriot First Division	29	9	4	0	—		6 (Note: Appearances in UEFA Champions League)	0	—		39	9
APOEL	2018–19	Cypriot First Division	0	0	0	0	—		7 (Note: Two appearances in UEFA Champions League, five appearances and one goal in UEFA Europa League)	1	—		7	1
APOEL	Total		29	9	4	0	—		13	1	—		46	10
SC Freiburg	2018–19	Bundesliga	10	2	0	0	—		—		—		10	2
SC Freiburg	2019–20	Bundesliga	21	2	2	0	—		—		—		23	2
SC Freiburg	2020–21	Bundesliga	28	8	1	0	—		—		—		29	8
SC Freiburg	2021–22	Bundesliga	31	4	5	1	—		—		—		36	5
SC Freiburg	2022–23	Bundesliga	19	1	4	1	—		3 (Note: Appearances in UEFA Europa League)	0	—		26	2
SC Freiburg	2023–24	Bundesliga	27	3	1	1	—		9	4	—		37	8
SC Freiburg	2024–25	Bundesliga	2	0	0	0	—		—		—		2	0
SC Freiburg	Total		138	20	13	3	—		12	4	—		163	27
Galatasaray	2024–25	Süper Lig	27	2	4	2	—		2	2	—		33	6
Galatasaray	2025–26	Süper Lig	30	1	3	0	—		12	0	2 (Note: Appearances in Turkish Super Cup)	0	47	1
Galatasaray	Total		57	3	7	2	—		14	2	2	0	80	7
Career total			293	36	29	5	4	1	39	7	2	0	367	49

=== International ===
As of match played 14 November 2026

Appearances and goals by national team and year
National team	Year	Apps	Goals
Hungary	2016	1	0
Hungary	2017	5	0
Hungary	2018	6	1
Hungary	2019	4	0
Hungary	2020	4	1
Hungary	2021	10	3
Hungary	2022	8	4
Hungary	2023	8	3
Hungary	2024	12	2
Hungary	2025	6	1
Hungary	2026	4	0
Total		68	15

Scores and results list Hungary's goal tally first, score column indicates score after each Sallai goal.

List of international goals scored by Roland Sallai
No.	Date	Venue	Opponent	Score	Result	Competition
1	11 September 2018	Groupama Arena, Budapest, Hungary	Greece	1–0	2–1	2018–19 UEFA Nations League C
2	6 September 2020	Puskás Aréna, Budapest, Hungary	Russia	1–3	2–3	2020–21 UEFA Nations League B
3	25 March 2021	Puskás Aréna, Budapest, Hungary	Poland	1–0	3–3	2022 FIFA World Cup qualification
4	28 March 2021	San Marino Stadium, Serravalle, San Marino	San Marino	2–0	3–0	2022 FIFA World Cup qualification
5	12 October 2021	Wembley Stadium, London, England	England	1–0	1–1	2022 FIFA World Cup qualification
6	29 March 2022	Windsor Park, Belfast, Northern Ireland	Northern Ireland	1–0	1–0	Friendly
7	14 June 2022	Molineux Stadium, Wolverhampton, England	England	1–0	4–0	2022–23 UEFA Nations League A
8	14 June 2022	Molineux Stadium, Wolverhampton, England	England	2–0	4–0	2022–23 UEFA Nations League A
9	20 November 2022	Puskás Aréna, Budapest, Hungary	Greece	1–0	2–1	Friendly
10	20 June 2023	Puskás Aréna, Budapest, Hungary	Lithuania	2–0	2–0	UEFA Euro 2024 qualifying
11	10 September 2023	Puskás Aréna, Budapest, Hungary	Czech Republic	1–0	1–1	Friendly
12	14 October 2023	Puskás Aréna, Budapest, Hungary	Serbia	2–1	2–1	UEFA Euro 2024 qualifying
13	8 June 2024	Nagyerdei Stadion, Debrecen, Hungary	Israel	1–0	3–0	Friendly
14	11 October 2024	Puskás Aréna, Budapest, Hungary	Netherlands	1–0	1–1	2024–25 UEFA Nations League A
15	6 September 2025	Aviva Stadium, Dublin, Ireland	Republic of Ireland	2–0	2–2	2026 FIFA World Cup qualification

== Honours ==
APOEL

- Cypriot First Division: 2017–18

Galatasaray

- Süper Lig: 2024–25, 2025–26
- Turkish Cup: 2024–25
