= Jonathan Schmid =

French footballer (born 1990)

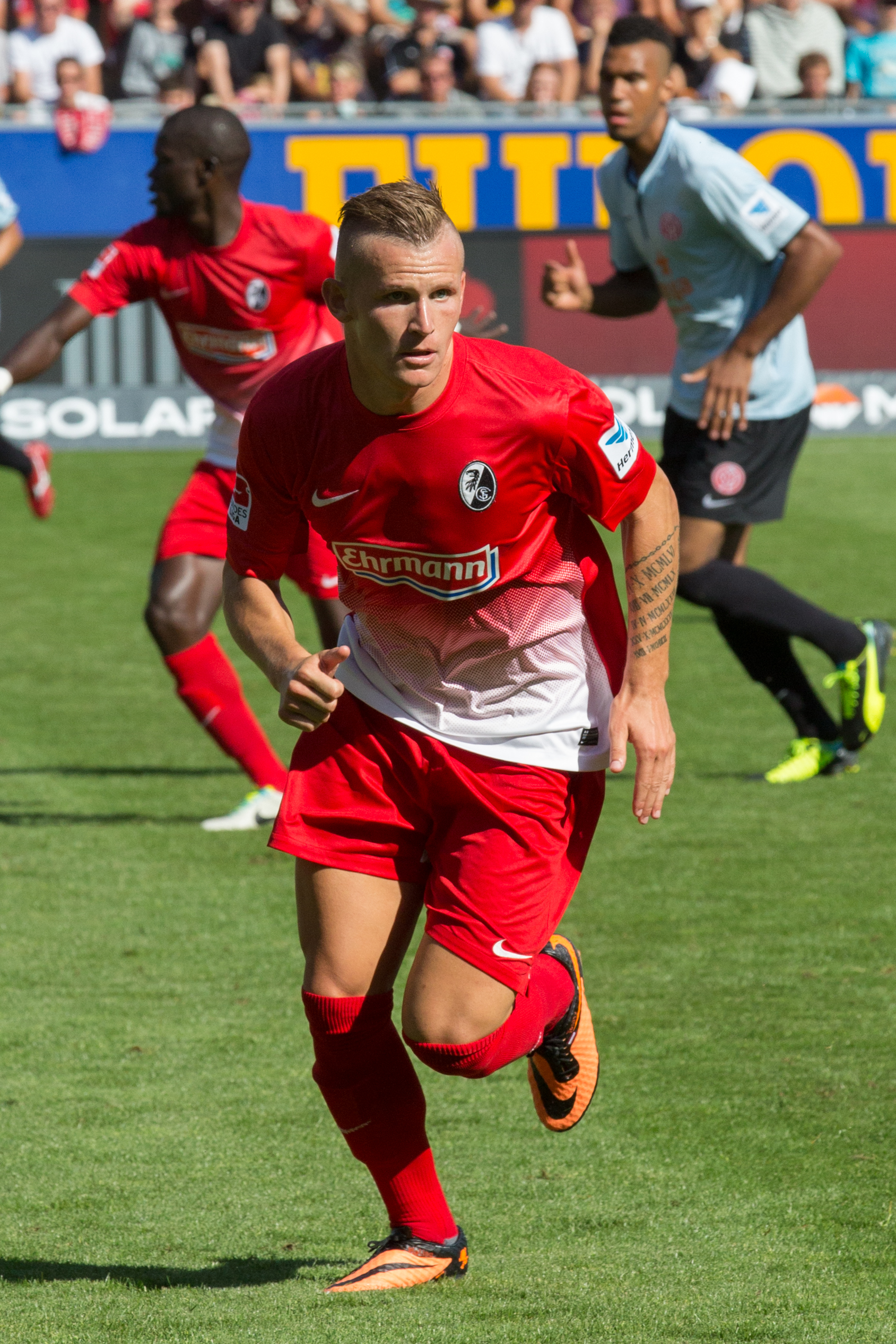
- Schmid with SC Freiburg in 2013

Personal information
- Date of birth: 22 June 1990 (age 36)
- Place of birth: Strasbourg, France
- Height: 1.79 m (5 ft 10 in)
- Positions: Midfielder; right back

Team information
- Current team: Progrès Niederkorn
- Number: 7

Youth career
- Strasbourg
- Sporting Schiltigheim
- 2007: Mars Bischheim
- 2008: Offenburger FV
- 2008–2009: SC Freiburg

Senior career*
Years	Team	Apps	(Gls)
2009–2015	SC Freiburg II	61	(12)
2010–2015	SC Freiburg	118	(20)
2015–2016	1899 Hoffenheim	23	(4)
2016–2019	FC Augsburg	78	(4)
2019–2023	SC Freiburg	80	(7)
2021–2023	SC Freiburg II	2	(2)
2023–2024	Austria Lustenau	9	(0)
2024–	Progrès Niederkorn	43	(5)
- * Club domestic league appearances and goals as of 20 October 2025

Jonathan Schmid (born 22 June 1990) is a French professional footballer who plays as a midfielder or right back for Luxembourgish club Progrès Niederkorn.

== Early and personal life ==
Schmid was born in 1990 in Strasbourg to an Austrian father who comes from Gresten in the District of Scheibbs in Lower Austria, and an Alsatian mother He is of Algerian descent through his maternal grandfather. He grew up in the troubled neighbourhood of Neuhof. His brother Anthony Schmid is also a professional footballer in Austria.

== Career ==
=== Early career ===
In 1994, he started in the youth academy of Racing Strasbourg. In 2006, he left the club and played for Sporting Schiltigheim and Mars Bischheim. Strasbourg is situated on the border with Germany; on the recommendation of a friend, he went into the youth of the German amateur side Offenburger FV. In a game in the A-youth-Bundesliga against SC Freiburg, he was the coach of the Freiburg side, Christian Streich, on and convinced him with his performance. Finally to the 2008–09 season, he joined the youth academy of SC Freiburg and won in his first season, the DFB-Pokal in the A-youth.

=== 1899 Hoffenheim ===
In June 2015, Schmid signed a four-year contract with 1899 Hoffenheim, as part of a deal that saw Vincenzo Grifo join SC Freiburg.

=== FC Augsburg ===
In August 2016 Schmid joined FC Augsburg on a four-year-contract.

=== Return to SC Freiburg ===
On 31 May 2019, FC Augsburg announced, that Schmid would return to SC Freiburg for the upcoming season.

=== Later career ===
On 4 September 2023, Schmid joined his brother Anthony at Austria Lustenau on a one-season contract, with an option for a second year.

In January 2024 he signed for Luxembourgish club Progrès Niederkorn.

== Career statistics ==
As of match played 1 July 2022

Appearances by club, season and competition
Club	Season	League			DFB-Pokal		Other		Total	
Club	Season	Division	Apps	Goals	Apps	Goals	Apps	Goals	Apps	Goals
SC Freiburg II	2009–10	Regionalliga Süd	18	0	—		—		18	0
SC Freiburg II	2010–11	Regionalliga Süd	31	8	—		—		31	8
SC Freiburg II	2011–12	Regionalliga Süd	12	4	—		—		12	4
SC Freiburg II	Total		61	12	—		0	0	61	12
SC Freiburg	2010–11	Bundesliga	1	0	0	0	—		1	0
SC Freiburg	2011–12	Bundesliga	22	1	0	0	—		22	1
SC Freiburg	2012–13	Bundesliga	33	11	5	1	—		38	12
SC Freiburg	2013–14	Bundesliga	29	4	2	0	2 (Note: Appearances in the UEFA Europa League)	0	33	4
SC Freiburg	2014–15	Bundesliga	33	4	4	1	—		37	5
SC Freiburg	Total		118	20	11	2	2	0	131	22
1899 Hoffeheim	2015–16	Bundesliga	23	4	1	0	—		24	4
FC Augsburg	2016–17	Bundesliga	25	1	1	0	—		26	1
FC Augsburg	2017–18	Bundesliga	25	0	1	0	—		26	0
FC Augsburg	2018–19	Bundesliga	28	3	1	0	—		29	3
FC Augsburg	Total		78	4	3	0	0	0	81	4
SC Freiburg	2019–20	Bundesliga	33	5	2	0	—		35	5
SC Freiburg	2020–21	Bundesliga	31	2	2	1	—		33	3
SC Freiburg	2021–22	Bundesliga	13	0	3	1	—		16	1
SC Freiburg	Total		77	7	7	2	0	0	84	9
SC Freiburg II	2021–22	3. Liga	1	0	—		—		1	0
Career total			358	47	22	4	2	0	382	51
