= Vladimír Darida =

Czech footballer (born 1990)

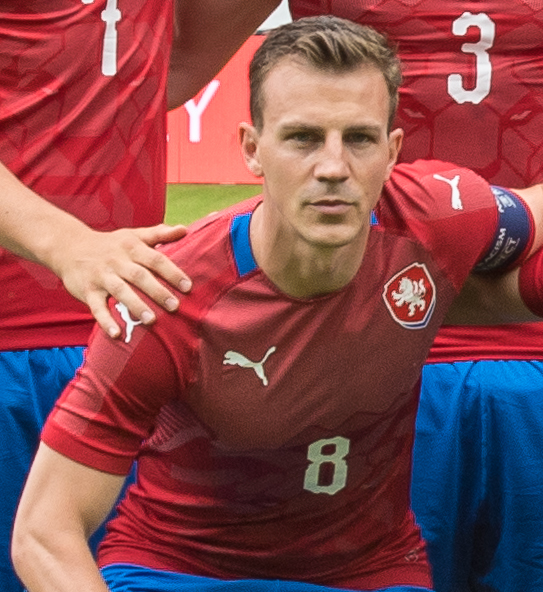
- Darida lining up with Czech Republic in 2018

Personal information
- Full name: Vladimír Darida
- Date of birth: 8 August 1990 (age 36)
- Place of birth: Plzeň, Czechoslovakia
- Height: 1.72 m (5 ft 8 in)
- Position: Midfielder

Team information
- Current team: Hradec Králové
- Number: 16

Youth career
- 1995–2010: Viktoria Plzeň

Senior career*
Years	Team	Apps	(Gls)
2010–2013	Viktoria Plzeň	61	(12)
2011	→ Sokolov (loan)	13	(5)
2013–2015	Freiburg	54	(9)
2015–2022	Hertha BSC	171	(13)
2022–2025	Aris	83	(8)
2025–	Hradec Králové	32	(11)

International career^{‡}
2011–2012	Czech Republic U21	5	(2)
2012–2026	Czech Republic	80	(8)
- * Club domestic league appearances and goals as of 27 May 2026 ‡ National team caps and goals as of 18 June 2026

Vladimír Darida (Czech pronunciation: [ˈvlaɟɪmiːr ˈdarɪda]; born 8 August 1990) is a Czech professional footballer who plays as a central midfielder for Czech First League club Hradec Králové.

== Club career ==
=== Early football career in the Czech Republic ===
Born in Plzeň, Darida came through at Viktoria Plzeň whilst also spending time on loan at FK Baník Sokolov in 2011.

=== SC Freiburg ===
In late summer 2013, Darida transferred to SC Freiburg for a transfer fee reported as four million Euros, joining up with his compatriots Pavel Krmaš and Václav Pilař. According to Viktoria Plzeň owner Tomáš Paclík, Freiburg paid 6.2 million Euros for Darida and a 30% share of the next transfer.

On 24 October 2013, Darida debuted for SC Freiburg in the 2013–14 UEFA Europa League group stage match against Estoril Praia, scoring a goal in the 11th minute which ended in a 1–1 draw. The same year on 27 October, he made his Bundesliga debut in a 0–3 home defeat against Hamburger SV.

On 2 November 2014, Darida scored a penalty for the only goal of the game away to 1. FC Köln to give the club their first win in their 10th game of the season, moving them out of the direct relegation places.

=== Hertha BSC ===
Darida signed for Hertha BSC following Freiburg's relegation ahead of the 2015–16 Bundesliga for an undisclosed fee, wearing number 6 shirt. He made an immediate impact for his club by scoring on his debut in the first round of DFB-Pokal against Arminia Bielefeld, which ended in a 2–0 victory. Darida got his first assist of the season through setting up Salomon Kalou in a 3–1 defeat to Borussia Dortmund. On 27 September he got his first league goal of the season scoring the equaliser in a 1–1 draw away to Frankfurt.

=== Aris Thessaloniki ===
Darida signed for Aris Thessaloniki in December 2022.

=== Hradec Králové ===
On 23 May 2025, Darida signed a one-year contract with Hradec Králové with option.

== International career ==
On 26 May 2012, Darida debuted for the Czech Republic national football team in a 2–1 friendly victory against Israel. Two days later, he was included in the Czech squad for the UEFA Euro 2012 to replace the injured defender Daniel Pudil. In the UEFA Euro 2012 quarter-final against Portugal, Darida earned his second international appearance as well as first in a competitive tournament, replacing the injured Tomáš Rosický before coming off as a substitute after 61 minutes for Jan Rezek, ending in a 1–0 loss for the Czechs.

Darida was included in the Czech Republic squad for UEFA Euro 2020, serving as captain, after which he retired from international football as he wanted to focus on spending time with his family. Tomáš Souček was named as his successor as national team captain.

In March 2026, Darida agreed to return to the national team and help the team in 2026 FIFA World Cup qualification play-offs.

On 31 May 2026, Darida was selected in the 26-man squad for the 2026 FIFA World Cup.

== Career statistics ==
=== Club ===
As of 17 May 2026

Appearances and goals by club, season and competition
Club	Season	League			National cup (Note: Includes Czech Cup, DFB-Pokal, Greek Football Cup)		Continental		Other		Total	
Club	Season	Division	Apps	Goals	Apps	Goals	Apps	Goals	Apps	Goals	Apps	Goals
Viktoria Plzeň	2009–10	Czech First League	3	0	0	0	—		—		3	0
Viktoria Plzeň	2010–11	Czech First League	1	0	—		—		—		1	0
Viktoria Plzeň	2011–12	Czech First League	22	4	0	0	6	1	1 (Note: Appearance in Czech Supercup)	0	29	5
Viktoria Plzeň	2012–13	Czech First League	29	6	2	1	16 (Note: Appearances in UEFA Europa League)	3	—		47	10
Viktoria Plzeň	2013–14	Czech First League	6	2	0	0	6 (Note: Appearances in UEFA Champions League)	1	1	0	13	3
Viktoria Plzeň	Total		61	12	2	1	28	5	2	0	93	18
Baník Sokolov (loan)	2010–11	Czech National League	13	5	0	0	—		—		13	5
Freiburg	2013–14	Bundesliga	23	3	1	0	3	1	—		27	4
Freiburg	2014–15	Bundesliga	31	6	3	1	—		—		34	7
Freiburg	Total		54	9	4	1	3	1	—		61	11
Hertha	2015–16	Bundesliga	31	5	4	2	—		—		35	7
Hertha	2016–17	Bundesliga	25	2	2	0	4	0	—		31	2
Hertha	2017–18	Bundesliga	21	0	1	0	2	0	—		24	0
Hertha	2018–19	Bundesliga	10	0	1	0	—		—		11	0
Hertha	2019–20	Bundesliga	28	3	2	1	—		—		30	4
Hertha	2020–21	Bundesliga	27	1	1	0	—		—		28	1
Hertha	2021–22	Bundesliga	26	2	3	0	—		—		29	2
Hertha	2022–23	Bundesliga	3	0	1	0	—		—		4	0
Hertha	Total		171	13	15	3	6	0	—		192	16
Aris	2022–23	Superleague Greece	21	5	2	0	—		—		23	5
Aris	2023–24	Superleague Greece	33	3	7	2	4 (Note: Appearances in UEFA Europa Conference League)	0	—		44	5
Aris	2024–25	Superleague Greece	29	0	3	1	—		—		32	1
Aris	Total		83	8	12	3	4	0	—		99	11
Hradec Králové	2025–26	Czech First League	32	11	3	1	—		—		35	12
Career total			415	58	40	9	41	6	2	0	495	73

=== International ===
As of match played 18 June 2026

Appearances and goals by national team and year
National team	Year	Apps	Goals
Czech Republic	2012	9	0
Czech Republic	2013	6	0
Czech Republic	2014	7	0
Czech Republic	2015	9	1
Czech Republic	2016	10	0
Czech Republic	2017	8	3
Czech Republic	2018	4	0
Czech Republic	2019	8	2
Czech Republic	2020	7	2
Czech Republic	2021	8	0
Czech Republic	2022	0	0
Czech Republic	2023	0	0
Czech Republic	2024	0	0
Czech Republic	2025	0	0
Czech Republic	2026	4	0
Total		80	8

Scores and results list Czech Republic's goal tally first, score column indicates score after each Darida goal.

List of international goals scored by Vladimír Darida
No.	Date	Venue	Opponent	Score	Result	Competition
1	6 September 2015	Skonto Stadium, Riga, Latvia	Latvia	2–0	2–1	UEFA Euro 2016 qualification
2	26 March 2017	San Marino Stadium, Serravalle, San Marino	San Marino	2–0	6–0	2018 FIFA World Cup qualification
3	26 March 2017	San Marino Stadium, Serravalle, San Marino	San Marino	6–0	6–0	2018 FIFA World Cup qualification
4	1 September 2017	Eden Arena, Prague, Czech Republic	Germany	1–1	1–2	2018 FIFA World Cup qualification
5	10 September 2019	Podgorica City Stadium, Podgorica, Montenegro	Montenegro	3–0	3–0	UEFA Euro 2020 qualification
6	14 October 2019	Stadion Letná, Prague, Czech Republic	Northern Ireland	1–3	2–3	Friendly
7	7 October 2020	AEK Arena, Larnaca, Cyprus	Cyprus	2–1	2–1	Friendly
8	15 November 2020	Doosan Arena, Plzeň, Czech Republic	Israel	1–0	1–0	2020–21 UEFA Nations League B

== Honours ==
Viktoria Plzeň

- Czech First League: 2010–11, 2012–13
- Czech Cup: 2009–10
- Czech Supercup: 2011

Czech Republic

- China Cup bronze: 2018

Individual

- Czech Footballer of the Year: 2017
