= Vincenzo Grifo =

Italian footballer

Personal information
- Date of birth: 7 April 1993 (age 33)
- Place of birth: Pforzheim, Germany
- Height: 1.80 m (5 ft 11 in)
- Positions: Left winger; attacking midfielder

Team information
- Current team: SC Freiburg
- Number: 32

Youth career
- 1996–2006: 1. CfR Pforzheim
- 2006–2010: Germania Brötzingen
- 2010–2011: 1. CfR Pforzheim
- 2011–2012: Karlsruher SC

Senior career*
Years	Team	Apps	(Gls)
2012–2013	TSG Hoffenheim II	21	(9)
2012–2015	TSG Hoffenheim	12	(0)
2014	→ Dynamo Dresden (loan)	13	(1)
2014–2015	→ FSV Frankfurt (loan)	33	(7)
2015–2017	SC Freiburg	61	(20)
2017–2018	Borussia Mönchengladbach	17	(0)
2018–2019	TSG Hoffenheim	8	(1)
2019	→ SC Freiburg (loan)	16	(6)
2019–	SC Freiburg	230	(60)

International career
2013	Italy U20	4	(1)
2018–2023	Italy	9	(4)
- * Club domestic league appearances and goals as of 31 October 2026 (UTC)

Vincenzo Grifo (Italian pronunciation: [vinˈtʃɛntso ˈɡriːfo]; born 7 April 1993) is a professional footballer who plays as a left winger or attacking midfielder for Bundesliga club SC Freiburg. Born in Germany, he plays for the Italy national team.

== Club career ==
=== Early career ===
Grifo began his footballing career with local youth sides 1. CfR Pforzheim and Germania Brötzingen, before joining 2. Bundesliga side Karlsruher SC in 2011.

=== 1899 Hoffenheim ===
In July 2012, he joined Hoffenheim on a free transfer, signing a two-year contract with the club. After initially playing for the reserve side in the Regionalliga Südwest, he was soon promoted to the Hoffenheim senior squad, and made his debut with the club in the Bundesliga on 19 October 2012, in a 3–2 home win over Greuther Fürth, coming on as a substitute for Takashi Usami. His performances earned him a two-year contract extension, and saw him make a total of 12 substitute appearances throughout the 2012–13 season, as well as 13 appearances and 5 goals in the Regionalliga. In the summer of 2013, he was officially promoted to the first squad, and was given the number 32 shirt. He spent the next seasons on loan with Dynamo Dresden and FSV Frankfurt; with Frankfurt, he registered 7 goals and 10 assists in 35 appearances throughout the 2014–15 season.

=== SC Freiburg ===
His performances led SC Freiburg to purchase him for €1.5 million in July 2015; Grifo played a key role in helping the club to win the 2. Bundesliga title and obtain promotion to the Bundesliga, registering 14 goals and 15 assists in 31 league appearances throughout the 2015–16 season.

In the opening six matches of the 2016–17 season, Grifo registered one goal and four assists in the Bundesliga, as well as three goals in two appearances in the DFB-Pokal. He finished the season with 6 goals and 12 assists in 30 league matches.

In his time at Freiburg he scored 20 goals and made 26 assists in 61 league appearances.

=== Borussia Mönchengladbach ===
On 28 May 2017, Bundesliga rivals Borussia Mönchengladbach announced the signing of Grifo on a four-year contract for an undisclosed fee, thought to be around €6 million. The transfer went through on 1 July.

=== Return to 1899 Hoffenheim ===
On 11 June 2018, Hoffenheim signed Grifo on a four-year deal. Later that year, on 27 November, he made his UEFA Champions League debut in a 3–2 defeat against Shakhtar Donetsk.

=== Return to SC Freiburg ===
On 6 January 2019, Grifo returned to Freiburg on a loan deal until the end of 2018–19 season. On 2 September 2019, he rejoined Freiburg permanently once again, for a reported transfer fee of €7 million. In November 10, 2019, at the end of Freiburg's 1–0 victory over Eintracht Frankfurt, Grifo was sent off due for violent conduct which was caused by Frankfurt captain David Abraham shoulder-charging Freiburg coach Christian Streich. In the ensuing brawl, Grifo directly targeted and tried to attack Abraham, which ensued in his sending off after a VAR check. On 13 November 2022, he scored his first Bundesliga hat-trick in the first 20 minutes in a 4–1 win over Union Berlin.

On 30 November 2025, Grifo scored his 69th Bundesliga goal for Freiburg in a 4–0 win over Mainz, equaling Nils Petersen's club record in the competition; the latter also held the club's all-time scoring record with 105 goals. Later that year, on 20 December, he scored his record-breaking 70th goal in a 4–3 away win over Wolfsburg. On 7 March 2026, he scored a goal in a 3–3 draw with Bayer Leverkusen, reaching his 105th goal for Freiburg and equaling Petersen's all-time scoring record. Later that month, on 19 March, he found the net in a 5–1 win against Genk in the Europa League round of 16, becoming the club's all-time leading scorer with 106 goals.

== International career ==
On 6 September 2013, Grifo earned his first cap for the Italian under-20 team under manager Alberigo Evani, scoring a goal in a 3–3 draw against Switzerland in Lugano. On 14 October 2013, Grifo earned his first call-up to the Italy under-21 side from manager Luigi Di Biagio for Italy's Euro 2015 qualifying match against Belgium.

On 20 November 2018, Grifo made his senior debut for Italy, managed by Roberto Mancini, as a second half substitute during a 1–0 friendly win against the United States in Genk.

On 15 October 2019, Grifo made his first start for Italy in a 5–0 away win against Liechtenstein during a UEFA Euro 2020 qualifying match.

On 11 November 2020, Grifo scored his first goals for Italy, the first in the first half, and the second in the second half via a penalty shot, in a 4–0 home win against Estonia during a friendly. On 16 November 2022, he scored another brace in a friendly match against Albania.

== Style of play ==
Grifo usually plays as a winger on the left flank, despite being naturally right-footed, a position which allows him to cut into the middle and shoot on goal, due to his finishing ability as well as his striking accuracy from distance; a versatile playmaker, he is also capable of playing as an attacking midfielder, as well as in several other attacking positions, and has frequently been deployed as an outside forward. Considered to be a talented player, he is mainly known for his technique, flair, and dribbling skills, while his vision, range of passing, set-piece delivery, and crossing accuracy make him an excellent assist provider. A dead-ball specialist, he is also an accurate free kick and penalty kick taker.

== Personal life ==
Grifo was born in Pforzheim, Germany, to Italian parents; his mother is from Apulia, while his father is from Naro, in the province of Agrigento, Sicily.

== Career statistics ==
=== Club ===
As of match played 31 October 2026

Appearances and goals by club, season and competition
Club	Season	League			DFB-Pokal		Europe		Total	
Club	Season	Division	Apps	Goals	Apps	Goals	Apps	Goals	Apps	Goals
TSG Hoffenheim	2012–13	Bundesliga	12	0	0	0	—		12	0
Dynamo Dresden (loan)	2013–14	2. Bundesliga	13	1	0	0	—		13	1
FSV Frankfurt (loan)	2014–15	2. Bundesliga	33	7	2	0	—		35	7
SC Freiburg	2015–16	2. Bundesliga	31	14	1	0	—		32	14
SC Freiburg	2016–17	Bundesliga	30	6	2	3	—		32	9
SC Freiburg	Total		61	20	3	3	—		64	23
Borussia Mönchengladbach	2017–18	Bundesliga	17	0	1	0	—		18	0
TSG Hoffenheim	2018–19	Bundesliga	7	1	2	0	1 (Note: Appearance in UEFA Champions League)	0	10	1
TSG Hoffenheim	2019–20	Bundesliga	1	0	1	0	—		2	0
TSG Hoffenheim	Total		8	1	3	0	1	0	12	1
SC Freiburg (loan)	2018–19	Bundesliga	16	6	0	0	—		16	6
SC Freiburg	2019–20	Bundesliga	26	4	1	0	—		27	4
SC Freiburg	2020–21	Bundesliga	31	9	2	0	—		33	9
SC Freiburg	2021–22	Bundesliga	34	9	6	4	—		40	13
SC Freiburg	2022–23	Bundesliga	33	15	5	0	8 (Note: Appearances in UEFA Europa League)	2	46	17
SC Freiburg	2023–24	Bundesliga	32	8	2	0	10	4	44	12
SC Freiburg	2024–25	Bundesliga	34	8	3	2	—		37	10
SC Freiburg	2025–26	Bundesliga	33	7	5	2	15	5	53	14
SC Freiburg	2026–27	Bundesliga	7	0	2	0	4 (Note: Appearances in UEFA Conference League)	1	13	1
SC Freiburg	Total		230	60	26	8	37	12	293	80
Career total			388	93	35	11	38	12	461	116

=== International ===
Appearances and goals by national team and year
National team	Year	Apps	Goals
Italy	2018	1	0
Italy	2019	1	0
Italy	2020	2	2
Italy	2021	2	0
Italy	2022	2	2
Italy	2023	1	0
Total		9	4

Scores and results list Italy's goal tally first, score column indicates score after each Grifo goal.

List of international goals scored by Vincenzo Grifo
No.	Date	Venue	Cap	Opponent	Score	Result	Competition
1	11 November 2020	Stadio Artemio Franchi, Florence, Italy	4	Estonia	1–0	4–0	Friendly
2	11 November 2020	Stadio Artemio Franchi, Florence, Italy	4	Estonia	3–0	4–0	Friendly
3	16 November 2022	Arena Kombëtare, Tirana, Albania	7	Albania	2–1	3–1	Friendly
4	16 November 2022	Arena Kombëtare, Tirana, Albania	7	Albania	3–1	3–1	Friendly

== Honours ==
SC Freiburg

- 2. Bundesliga: 2015–16
- DFB-Pokal runner-up: 2021–22
- UEFA Europa League runner-up: 2025–26

Individual

- 2. Bundesliga top assist provider: 2015–16 (11 assists)
