= Charles-Elie Laprévotte =

French footballer (born 1992)

Personal information
- Date of birth: 4 October 1992 (age 34)
- Place of birth: Nancy, France
- Height: 1.81 m (5 ft 11 in)
- Position: Defensive midfielder

Team information
- Current team: Bayonne
- Number: 6

Youth career
- 2002–2005: SAS Épinal
- 2007–2011: Strasbourg

Senior career*
Years	Team	Apps	(Gls)
2011–2015	SC Freiburg II	85	(4)
2013–2016	SC Freiburg	1	(0)
2015–2016	→ Preußen Münster (loan)	29	(3)
2017–2020	1. FC Magdeburg	57	(1)
2020–2021	Kickers Offenbach	12	(1)
2021–2022	SV Elversberg	32	(1)
2022–	Bayonne	69	(2)
- * Club domestic league appearances and goals as of 4 December 2025

Charles-Elie Laprévotte (born 4 October 1992) is a French professional footballer who plays as a defensive midfielder for National 2 club Bayonne.

== Career ==
Laprévotte made his debut in the Bundesliga for SC Freiburg on 27 August 2013 against Bayern Munich.

On 21 December 2020, Laprévotte joined German Regionalliga Südwest club Kickers Offenbach.

Laprévotte joined National 3 club Bayonne in August 2022.
