= Pavel Krmaš =

Czech footballer (born 1980)

Personal information
- Date of birth: 3 March 1980 (age 46)
- Place of birth: Broumov, Czechoslovakia
- Height: 1.93 m (6 ft 4 in)
- Positions: Defender; midfielder

Youth career
- 1986–1991: Slovan Broumov
- 1991–1994: TJ Náchod
- 1994–1999: Hradec Králové

Senior career*
Years	Team	Apps	(Gls)
1999–2001	Admira / Slavoj Prague		
2001–2002	Sparta Prague		
2002–2003	Hradec Králové	29	(5)
2003–2004	Sparta Prague	3	(0)
2004–2007	Teplice	86	(4)
2007–2015	SC Freiburg	157	(8)
2012–2013	SC Freiburg II	5	(0)
2015–2016	Hradec Králové	23	(2)
- * Club domestic league appearances and goals

Pavel Krmaš (born 3 March 1980) is a Czech former professional footballer who played as a defender.
