= Florian Kath =

German footballer

Personal information
- Date of birth: 21 October 1994 (age 32)
- Place of birth: Balingen, Germany
- Height: 1.86 m (6 ft 1 in)
- Position: Winger

Youth career
- 2000–2012: TSG Balingen

Senior career*
Years	Team	Apps	(Gls)
2012–2013	TSG Balingen		
2013–2019	SC Freiburg II	71	(11)
2015–2021	SC Freiburg	29	(1)
2016–2017	→ 1. FC Magdeburg (loan)	19	(3)
2020–2021	→ 1. FC Magdeburg (loan)	10	(0)
2021–2023	1. FC Magdeburg	21	(3)
2024	1. FC Magdeburg II	3	(1)
Total		153	(19)
- * Club domestic league appearances and goals

Florian Kath (born 21 October 1994) is a German former professional footballer who played as a winger. In May 2024 he announced his retirement from playing.
