= 2020–21 VfL Bochum season =

VfL Bochum
2020–21 season
- Chairman: Hans-Peter Villis
- Manager: Thomas Reis
- Stadium: Vonovia-Ruhrstadion
- 2. Bundesliga: 1st (promoted)
- DFB-Pokal: Third round
- Top goalscorer: League: Simon Zoller; Robert Žulj (15 each); All: Simon Zoller; Robert Žulj (16 each)
- Highest home attendance: 4,231 (vs VfL Osnabrück, 2 October 2020)
- Lowest home attendance: 300 (vs FC Erzgebirge Aue, 25 October 2020)
- Average home league attendance: 2,651 (Note: Average home league attendance does not include home matches played without an audience. These matches (against Fürth, Düsseldorf, Paderborn, Heidenheim, Darmstadt, Nuremberg, Karlsruhe, Braunschweig, Würzburg, Hamburg, Kiel, Hannover, Regensburg and Sandhausen) would lower the average from 2,651 to 468.) (Note: Due to the COVID-19 pandemic in Germany audience sizes are limited by local authorities.)
Home colours	Away colours

The 2020–21 VfL Bochum season was the 83rd season in the club's history.

== Matches ==
=== Legend ===
Win Draw Loss

=== Friendly matches ===
15 August 2020 Friendly	VfL Bochum	0–0	KFC Uerdingen 05	Bochum
15:00				Stadium: Leichtathletikplatz am Vonovia-Ruhrstadion; Attendance: 0

18 August 2020 Friendly	1. FC Köln	3–2	VfL Bochum	Cologne
16:00	Jakobs 4'; Kainz 37'; Clemens 94'		Pantović 124'; Ekincier 128'	Stadium: Franz-Kremer-Stadion; Attendance: 200
Note: 3× 45 minutes

22 August 2020 Friendly	Fortuna Düsseldorf	1–0	VfL Bochum	Düsseldorf
16:00	Karaman 44'			Stadium: Merkur Spiel-Arena

26 August 2020 Friendly	VfB Lübeck	Cancelled	VfL Bochum
17:00

28 August 2020 Friendly	Borussia Dortmund	1–3	VfL Bochum	Dortmund
18:00	Hummels 66'		Ganvoula 16', 46'; Zoller 24'	Stadium: BVB-Trainingsgelände; Attendance: 0

3 September 2020 Friendly	PSV Eindhoven	Cancelled	VfL Bochum
16:00

5 September 2020 Friendly	FC Schalke 04	3–0	VfL Bochum	Gelsenkirchen
15:30	Boujellab 25'; Uth 33'; Harit 39'			Stadium: Parkstadion; Attendance: 300; Referee: Mitja Stegemann (Bonn)

9 October 2020 Friendly	VfL Bochum	1–1	Arminia Bielefeld	Bochum
15:30	Blum 56'		Consbruch 51'	Stadium: Leichtathletikplatz am Vonovia-Ruhrstadion

12 November 2020 Friendly	1. FC Köln	1–3	VfL Bochum	Cologne
15:00	Wolf 73'		Meré 22' (o.g.); Bonga 52'; Čavar 87'	Stadium: Franz-Kremer-Stadion; Attendance: 0 Referee: Mitja Stegemann (Bonn)

=== 2. Bundesliga ===
==== League table ====
Pos	Team	Pld	W	D	L	GF	GA	GD	Pts	Qualification or relegation
1	VfL Bochum (C, P)	34	21	4	9	66	39	+27	67	Promotion to Bundesliga
2	Greuther Fürth (P)	34	18	10	6	69	44	+25	64	Promotion to Bundesliga
3	Holstein Kiel	34	18	8	8	57	35	+22	62	Qualification for promotion play-offs
4	Hamburger SV	34	16	10	8	71	44	+27	58	
5	Fortuna Düsseldorf	34	16	8	10	55	46	+9	56	

Source: DFB
Rules for classification: 1) Points; 2) Goal difference; 3) Goals scored; 4) Head-to-head points; 5) Head-to-head goal difference; 6) Head-to-head away goals scored; 7) Away goals scored; 8) Play-off.
(C) Champions; (P) Promoted

==== Results summary ====
Overall								Home						Away					
Pld	W	D	L	GF	GA	GD	Pts	W	D	L	GF	GA	GD	W	D	L	GF	GA	GD
34	21	4	9	66	39	+27	67	12	2	3	40	16	+24	9	2	6	26	23	+3

==== Results by round ====
Round	1	2	3	4	5	6	7	8	9	10	11	12	13	14	15	16	17	18	19	20	21	22	23	24	25	26	27	28	29	30	31	32	33	34
Ground	H	A	H	A	H	A	H	A	H	A	H	A	H	H	A	H	A	A	H	A	H	A	H	A	H	A	H	A	H	A	A	H	A	H
Result	D	W	D	L	W	W	L	W	W	L	W	L	W	W	W	W	D	W	L	W	W	L	W	W	L	W	W	L	W	W	L	W	D	W
Position	7	4	5	10	5	2	6	4	2	3	3	4	4	4	2	2	2	2	2	2	2	3	1	1	1	1	1	1	1	1	1	1	1	1

A = Away; H = Home; W = Win; D = Draw; L = Loss

==== Matches ====
21 September 2020 1	VfL Bochum	2–2	FC St. Pauli	Bochum
20:30	Žulj 26'; Zoller 76'		Kyereh 84', 86'	Stadium: Vonovia-Ruhrstadion; Attendance: 3,421; Referee: Robert Schröder (Hannover)

27 September 2020 2	Karlsruher SC	0–1	VfL Bochum	Karlsruhe
13:30			Zoller 14'	Stadium: Wildparkstadion; Attendance: 1,200; Referee: Marco Fritz (Korb)

2 October 2020 3	VfL Bochum	0–0	VfL Osnabrück	Bochum
18:30				Stadium: Vonovia-Ruhrstadion; Attendance: 4,231; Referee: Alexander Sather (Grimma)

17 October 2020 4	Eintracht Braunschweig	2–1	VfL Bochum	Braunschweig
13:00	Kaufmann 23'; Proschwitz 63'		Zoller 5'	Stadium: Eintracht-Stadion; Attendance: 3,815; Referee: Christof Günsch (Marburg)

25 October 2020 5	VfL Bochum	2–0	FC Erzgebirge Aue	Bochum
13:30	Žulj 74'; Ganvoula 82'			Stadium: Vonovia-Ruhrstadion; Attendance: 300; Referee: Nicolas Winter (Hagenbach)

1 November 2020 6	Würzburger Kickers	2–3	VfL Bochum	Würzburg
13:30	Munsy 7'; Sontheimer 35'		Novothny 21'; Soares 32'; Zoller 73'	Stadium: Stadion am Dallenberg; Attendance: 0 (Note: Due to the COVID-19 pandemic in Germany no audience was allowed to be present by local authorities.); Referee: Martin Thomsen (Kleve)

7 November 2020 7	VfL Bochum	0–2	SpVgg Greuther Fürth	Bochum
13:00			Seguin 9'; Ernst 34'	Stadium: Vonovia-Ruhrstadion; Attendance: 0 Referee: Bastian Dankert (Rostock)

22 November 2020 8	Hamburger SV	1–3	VfL Bochum	Hamburg
13:30	Terodde 65' (pen.)		Žulj 35' (pen.); Blum 78'; Chibsah 82'	Stadium: Volksparkstadion; Attendance: 0 Referee: Tobias Reichel (Stuttgart)

30 November 2020 9	VfL Bochum	5–0	Fortuna Düsseldorf	Bochum
20:30	Blum 6' (pen.); Tesche 58'; Žulj 73', 74'; Pantović 90+2'			Stadium: Vonovia-Ruhrstadion; Attendance: 0 Referee: Frank Willenborg (Osnabrück)

4 December 2020 10	Holstein Kiel	3–1	VfL Bochum	Kiel
18:30	Mühling 31' (pen.); Bartels 64'; Lee 65'		Zoller 33'	Stadium: Holstein-Stadion; Attendance: 0 Referee: Robert Schröder (Hannover)

11 December 2020 11	VfL Bochum	3–0	SC Paderborn 07	Bochum
18:30	Žulj 54', 60' (pen.); Zoller 61'			Stadium: Vonovia-Ruhrstadion; Attendance: 0 Referee: Tobias Stieler (Hamburg)

15 December 2020 12	Hannover 96	2–0	VfL Bochum	Hannover
18:30	Sulejmani 2'; Ducksch 60' (pen.)			Stadium: Niedersachsenstadion; Attendance: 0 Referee: Felix Zwayer (Berlin)

18 December 2020 13	VfL Bochum	3–0	1. FC Heidenheim	Bochum
18:30	Blum 17'; Zoller 33'; Eisfeld 90+3'			Stadium: Vonovia-Ruhrstadion; Attendance: 0 Referee: Manuel Gräfe (Berlin)

2 January 2021 14	VfL Bochum	2–1	SV Darmstadt 98	Bochum
13:00	Kempe 82' (o.g.); Pantović 83'		Kempe 80'	Stadium: Vonovia-Ruhrstadion; Attendance: 0 Referee: Sven Waschitzki (Essen)

10 January 2021 15	SSV Jahn Regensburg	0–2	VfL Bochum	Regensburg
13:30			Zoller 80'; Eisfeld 90+5'	Stadium: Jahnstadion; Attendance: 0 Referee: Marco Fritz (Korb)

16 January 2021 16	VfL Bochum	3–1	1. FC Nuremberg	Bochum
13:00	Žulj 31'; Tesche 73', 83'		Schäffler 29'	Stadium: Vonovia-Ruhrstadion; Attendance: 0 Referee: Guido Winkmann (Kerken)

24 January 2021 17	SV Sandhausen	1–1	VfL Bochum	Sandhausen
13:30	Behrens 44'		Žulj 84'	Stadium: Hardtwaldstadion; Attendance: 0 Referee: Michael Bacher (Amerang-Kirchensur)

28 January 2021 18	FC St. Pauli	2–3	VfL Bochum	Hamburg
20:30	Burgstaller 4'; Kyereh 32'		Zoller 28', 43'; Žulj 63'	Stadium: Millerntor-Stadion; Attendance: 0 Referee: Harm Osmers (Hannover)

31 January 2021 19	VfL Bochum	1–2	Karlsruher SC	Bochum
13:30	Losilla 55'		Bormuth 14'; Gondorf 84'	Stadium: Vonovia-Ruhrstadion; Attendance: 0 Referee: Christof Günsch (Marburg)

6 February 2021 20	VfL Osnabrück	1–2	VfL Bochum	Osnabrück
13:00	Kerk 64'		Zoller 18'; Losilla 36'	Stadium: Stadion an der Bremer Brücke; Attendance: 0 Referee: Sven Waschitzki (Essen)

14 February 2021 21	VfL Bochum	2–0	Eintracht Braunschweig	Bochum
13:30	Bella-Kotchap 8'; Soares 32'			Stadium: Vonovia-Ruhrstadion; Attendance: 0 Referee: Matthias Jöllenbeck (Freiburg)

19 February 2021 22	FC Erzgebirge Aue	1–0	VfL Bochum	Aue
18:30	Bussmann 29'			Stadium: Erzgebirgsstadion; Attendance: 0 Referee: Martin Petersen (Stuttgart)

27 February 2021 23	VfL Bochum	3–0	Würzburger Kickers	Bochum
13:00	Žulj 21'; Blum 62'; Holtmann 81'			Stadium: Vonovia-Ruhrstadion; Attendance: 0 Referee: Markus Schmidt (Stuttgart)

6 March 2021 24	SpVgg Greuther Fürth	1–2	VfL Bochum	Fürth
13:00	Stach 18'		Losilla 7'; Žulj 61' (pen.)	Stadium: Sportpark Ronhof; Attendance: 0 Referee: Sven Jablonski (Bremen)

12 March 2021 25	VfL Bochum	0–2	Hamburger SV	Bochum
18:30			Onana 29'; Narey 89'	Stadium: Vonovia-Ruhrstadion; Attendance: 0 Referee: Felix Brych (Munich)

22 March 2021 26	Fortuna Düsseldorf	0–3	VfL Bochum	Düsseldorf
20:30			Zoller 12'; Holtmann 35'; Novothny 87'	Stadium: Merkur Spiel-Arena; Attendance: 0 Referee: Deniz Aytekin (Oberasbach)

3 April 2021 27	VfL Bochum	2–1	Holstein Kiel	Bochum
13:00	Zoller 5', 60'		Mühling 81' (pen.)	Stadium: Vonovia-Ruhrstadion; Attendance: 0 Referee: Martin Petersen (Stuttgart)

10 April 2021 28	SC Paderborn 07	3–0	VfL Bochum	Paderborn
13:00	Justvan 36'; Michel 39'; Antwi-Adjei 73'			Stadium: Benteler-Arena; Attendance: 0 Referee: Thorben Siewer (Olpe)

18 April 2021 29	VfL Bochum	4–3	Hannover 96	Bochum
13:30	Tesche 29', 90+2'; Holtmann 38'; Zoller 62'		Kaiser 22'; Ducksch 67'; Ochs 90'	Stadium: Vonovia-Ruhrstadion; Attendance: 0 Referee: Daniel Schlager (Hügelsheim)

21 April 2021 30	1. FC Heidenheim	0–2	VfL Bochum	Heidenheim an der Brenz
18:30			Tesche 33'; Bockhorn 82'	Stadium: Voith-Arena; Attendance: 0 Referee: Deniz Aytekin (Oberasbach)

26 April 2021 31	SV Darmstadt 98	3–1	VfL Bochum	Darmstadt
20:30	Clemens 79'; Dursun 81', 86'		Tesche 74'	Stadium: Stadion am Böllenfalltor; Attendance: 0 Referee: Bastian Dankert (Rostock)

9 May 2021 32	VfL Bochum	5–1	SSV Jahn Regensburg	Bochum
13:30	Tesche 29'; Beste 38' (o.g.); Holtmann 61'; Žulj 78'; Ganvoula 90+2' (pen.)		Albers 26'	Stadium: Vonovia-Ruhrstadion; Attendance: 0 Referee: Sascha Stegemann (Niederkassel)

16 May 2021 33	1. FC Nuremberg	1–1	VfL Bochum	Nuremberg
15:30	Margreitter 38'		Žulj 76'	Stadium: Max-Morlock-Stadion; Attendance: 0 Referee: Markus Schmidt (Stuttgart)

23 May 2021 34	VfL Bochum	3–1	SV Sandhausen	Bochum
15:30	Pantović 29'; Losilla 78'; Žulj 87'		Behrens 60'	Stadium: Vonovia-Ruhrstadion; Attendance: 0 Referee: Tobias Reichel (Stuttgart)

=== DFB-Pokal ===
12 September 2020 R1	FV Engers 07	0–3	VfL Bochum	Bochum (Note: Due to the impact of the COVID-19 pandemic in Germany and the organisational effort required to host the fixture, the teams exchanged the home rights to the match.)
15:30			Žulj 23'; Zoller 52'; Pantović 65'	Stadium: Vonovia-Ruhrstadion; Attendance: 0 Referee: Florian Heft (Wietmarschen)

23 December 2020 R2	1. FSV Mainz 05	2–2 (a.e.t.) (0–3 p)	VfL Bochum	Mainz
20:45	Boëtius 7'; Latza 55'		Holtmann 66'; Tesche 90+4'	Stadium: Opel Arena; Attendance: 0 Referee: Martin Petersen (Stuttgart)
	Penalties
	Szalai (penalty missed); Stöger (penalty missed); Mateta (penalty missed)		(penalty scored) Pantović; (penalty scored) Mašović; (penalty scored) Ganvoula

3 February 2021 R3	RB Leipzig	4–0	VfL Bochum	Leipzig
18:30	Haidara 11'; Sabitzer 45+1' (pen.); Poulsen 66', 75'			Stadium: Zentralstadion; Attendance: 0 Referee: Bastian Dankert (Rostock)

== Squad ==
=== Squad and statistics ===
==== Squad, appearances and goals scored ====
As of 23 May 2021

No.	Pos	Nat	Player	Total		2. Bundesliga		DFB-Pokal	
No.	Pos	Nat	Player	Apps	Goals	Apps	Goals	Apps	Goals
1	GK	(Germany) GER	Manuel Riemann	32	0	30	0	2	0
2	DF	(Costa Rica) CRC	Cristian Gamboa	32	0	29	0	3	0
3	DF	(Brazil) BRA	Danilo Soares	35	2	32	2	3	0
4	DF	(Serbia) SRB	Erhan Mašović (since 5 October 2020)	10	0	8	0	2	0
5	DF	(Switzerland) SUI	Saulo Decarli	6	0	5	0	1	0
7	MF	(Germany) GER	Sebastian Maier (until 20 January 2021)	0	0	0	0	0	0
8	MF	(France) FRA	Anthony Losilla (captain)	35	4	32	4	3	0
9	FW	(Germany) GER	Simon Zoller	35	16	32	15	3	1
10	MF	(Germany) GER	Thomas Eisfeld	24	2	22	2	2	0
11	DF	(Uganda) UGA	Herbert Bockhorn	26	1	24	1	2	0
13	MF	(Ghana) GHA	Raman Chibsah (since 18 September 2020)	11	1	10	1	1	0
14	FW	(Germany) GER	Tom Weilandt	0	0	0	0	0	0
15	FW	(Hungary) HUN	Soma Novothny	15	2	14	2	1	0
17	FW	(Germany) GER	Danny Blum	24	4	22	4	2	0
19	FW	(Germany) GER	Tarsis Bonga	12	0	11	0	1	0
20	MF	(Germany) GER	Vitaly Janelt (until 3 October 2020)	0	0	0	0	0	0
21	FW	(Germany) GER	Gerrit Holtmann	33	5	30	4	3	1
23	MF	(Germany) GER	Robert Tesche	35	9	33	8	2	1
24	DF	(Greece) GRE	Vasilis Lampropoulos	10	0	9	0	1	0
25	GK	(Germany) GER	Patrick Drewes	7	0	5	0	2	0
26	MF	(Germany) GER	Lars Holtkamp (until 2 January 2021)	1	0	0	0	1	0
27	FW	(Serbia) SRB	Miloš Pantović	31	4	28	3	3	1
28	FW	(Germany) GER	Luis Hartwig (since 12 November 2020)	1	0	1	0	0	0
29	DF	(Germany) GER	Maxim Leitsch	35	0	33	0	2	0
30	FW	(Azerbaijan) AZE	Baris Ekincier	0	0	0	0	0	0
32	MF	(Austria) AUT	Robert Žulj	34	16	31	15	3	1
33	DF	(Germany) GER	Moritz Römling (until 6 January 2021)	1	0	1	0	0	0
34	GK	(Germany) GER	Paul Grave	0	0	0	0	0	0
35	FW	(Republic of the Congo) CGO	Silvère Ganvoula	32	2	29	2	3	0
37	DF	(Germany) GER	Armel Bella-Kotchap	30	1	28	1	2	0
38	DF	(Greece) GRE	Stylianos Kokovas (until 11 January 2021)	0	0	0	0	0	0
39	DF	(Germany) GER	Verthomy Boboy (since 9 October 2020)	0	0	0	0	0	0
—	MF	(Germany) GER	Gabriel Čavar (since 12 November 2020)	0	0	0	0	0	0

=== Transfers ===
As of 20 January 2021

==== Summer ====
In:

No.	Pos.	Nation	Player
4	DF	SRB	Erhan Mašović (from (Belgium) Club Brugge KV)
11	DF	UGA	Herbert Bockhorn (from (England) Huddersfield Town A.F.C.)
13	MF	GHA	Raman Chibsah (from (Turkey) Gaziantep F.K.)
15	FW	HUN	Soma Novothny (from (Hungary) Újpest FC)
19	FW	GER	Tarsis Bonga (from Chemnitzer FC)
21	FW	GER	Gerrit Holtmann (from 1. FSV Mainz 05, previously on loan at SC Paderborn 07)
24	DF	GRE	Vasilis Lampropoulos (from (Spain) Deportivo de La Coruña, previously on loan)
30	FW	AZE	Baris Ekincier (loan return from SK Austria Klagenfurt)

Out:

No.	Pos.	Nation	Player
4	DF	GER	Simon Lorenz (to Holstein Kiel)
6	DF	ENG	Jordi Osei-Tutu (loan return to (England) Arsenal F.C.)
15	DF	GER	Maxwell Gyamfi (to Hamburger SV II)
18	FW	GER	Manuel Wintzheimer (loan return to Hamburger SV)
19	DF	GER	Patrick Fabian (retired)
20	MF	GER	Vitaly Janelt (to (England) Brentford F.C.)
21	DF	GER	Stefano Celozzi (released)
28	FW	GER	Ulrich Bapoh (to VfL Osnabrück)
36	MF	GER	Jan Wellers (to Rot-Weiß Oberhausen)
—	DF	AUT	Dominik Baumgartner (to (Austria) Wolfsberger AC, previously on loan)

==== Winter ====
In:

No.	Pos.	Nation	Player

Out:

No.	Pos.	Nation	Player
7	MF	GER	Sebastian Maier (to Türkgücü Munich)
26	MF	GER	Lars Holtkamp (on loan to Wuppertaler SV)
33	DF	GER	Moritz Römling (on loan to Wuppertaler SV)
38	DF	GRE	Stylianos Kokovas (to (Czech Republic) MFK Karviná)
