= 2021–22 VfL Bochum season =

VfL Bochum
2021–22 season
- Chairman: Hans-Peter Villis
- Head coach: Thomas Reis
- Stadium: Vonovia Ruhrstadion
- Bundesliga: 13th
- DFB-Pokal: Quarter-finals
- Top goalscorer: League: Sebastian Polter (10); All: Sebastian Polter (11)
- Biggest defeat: Bayern Munich 7–0 VfL Bochum
Home colours	Away colours	Third colours

The 2021–22 season was the 84th season in the existence of VfL Bochum and the club's first season back in the top flight of German football. In addition to the domestic league, VfL Bochum participated in this season's edition of the DFB-Pokal.

== Players ==
=== First-team squad ===
As of 31 January 2022

Note: Flags indicate national team as defined under FIFA eligibility rules; some limited exceptions apply. Players may hold more than one non-FIFA nationality.

No.	Pos.	Nation	Player
1	GK	GER	Manuel Riemann
2	DF	CRC	Cristian Gamboa
3	DF	BRA	Danilo Soares
4	DF	SRB	Erhan Mašović
5	DF	SUI	Saulo Decarli
6	MF	GER	Patrick Osterhage
7	FW	GER	Danny Blum
8	MF	FRA	Anthony Losilla (captain)
9	FW	GER	Simon Zoller
10	FW	JPN	Takuma Asano
11	DF	UGA	Herbert Bockhorn
14	FW	GER	Tom Weilandt
16	DF	GRE	Konstantinos Stafylidis (on loan from 1899 Hoffenheim)
17	FW	PHI	Gerrit Holtmann

No.	Pos.	Nation	Player
19	FW	NED	Jürgen Locadia
20	MF	GER	Elvis Rexhbeçaj (on loan from VfL Wolfsburg)
21	GK	GER	Michael Esser
22	FW	GHA	Christopher Antwi-Adjei
23	MF	GER	Robert Tesche
24	DF	GRE	Vasilis Lampropoulos
27	FW	SRB	Miloš Pantović
28	FW	GER	Luis Hartwig
29	DF	GER	Maxim Leitsch
32	FW	GER	Tarsis Bonga
34	GK	GER	Paul Grave
37	DF	GER	Armel Bella-Kotchap
38	MF	GER	Eduard Löwen (on loan from Hertha BSC)
40	FW	GER	Sebastian Polter

=== Out on loan ===
Note: Flags indicate national team as defined under FIFA eligibility rules; some limited exceptions apply. Players may hold more than one non-FIFA nationality.

No.	Pos.	Nation	Player
—	FW	CGO	Silvère Ganvoula (at Cercle Brugge until 30 June 2022)
—	DF	GER	Moritz Römling (at Türkgücü München until 30 June 2022)

== Transfers ==
=== In ===
No.	Pos	Player	Transferred from	Fee	Date	Source
6	MF	(Germany) Patrick Osterhage	(Germany) Borussia Dortmund II	Free	1 July 2021	
10	FW	(Japan) Takuma Asano	(Serbia) Partizan	Free	1 July 2021	
21	GK	(Germany) Michael Esser	(Germany) Hannover 96	Free	1 July 2021	
22	MF	(Ghana) Christopher Antwi-Adjei	(Germany) SC Paderborn	Free	1 July 2021	
38	MF	(Germany) Eduard Löwen	(Germany) Hertha BSC	Loan	1 July 2021	
16	DF	(Greece) Konstantinos Stafylidis	(Germany) 1899 Hoffenheim	Loan	1 August 2021	
20	MF	(Germany) Elvis Rexhbeçaj	(Germany) VfL Wolfsburg	Loan	2 August 2021	
40	FW	(Germany) Sebastian Polter	(Netherlands) Fortuna Sittard	Free	13 August 2021	
19	FW	(Netherlands) Jürgen Locadia	(England) Brighton & Hove Albion	Free	6 January 2022	

=== Out ===
No.	Pos	Player	Transferred to	Fee	Date	Source
10	MF	(Germany) Thomas Eisfeld		Free	1 July 2021	
25	GK	(Germany) Patrick Drewes	(Germany) SV Sandhausen	Free	1 July 2021	
32	MF	(Austria) Robert Žulj	(United Arab Emirates) Ittihad Kalba	€350,000	2 July 2021	
26	MF	(Germany) Lars Holtkamp	(Germany) Bonner SC	Free	30 July 2021	
30	FW	(Azerbaijan) Baris Ekincier	(Germany) Waldhof Mannheim	Undisclosed	31 August 2021	
15	FW	(Hungary) Soma Novothny	(Cyprus) Anorthosis Famagusta	Undisclosed	3 January 2022	
35	FW	(Republic of the Congo) Silvère Ganvoula	(Belgium) Cercle Brugge	Loan	25 January 2022	
13	MF	(Ghana) Raman Chibsah	(Greece) Apollon Smyrnis	Undisclosed	31 January 2022	

== Pre-season and friendlies ==
Win Draw Loss

7 July 2021 Friendly	SSVg Velbert	0–9	VfL Bochum	Velbert, Germany
18:30 CEST (UTC+2)				Stadium: Stadion Velbert

10 July 2021 Friendly	VfL Bochum	3–3	SC Verl	Germany
13:30 CEST (UTC+2)
Note: four halves of 30 minutes.

14 July 2021 Friendly	VfL Bochum	6–0	Bonner SC	Germany
16:00 CEST (UTC+2)

17 July 2021 Cup der Traditionen	Borussia Dortmund	1–3	VfL Bochum	Duisburg, Germany
15:00 CEST (UTC+2)	Pasalic 83'	Report	Novothny 66'; Ganvoula 68'; Bockhorn 78'	Stadium: MSV-Arena; Attendance: 10,395
Note: The match was extended from the initially planned 45 minutes to 90 minutes following MSV Duisburg's withdrawal from the tournament.

21 July 2021 Friendly	Parma	0–1	VfL Bochum	Parma, Italy
17:00 CEST (UTC+2)			Chibsah 76'	Stadium: Stadio Ennio Tardini

24 July 2021 Friendly	Torino	Cancelled	VfL Bochum	Brixen, Italy
17:00 CEST (UTC+2)				Stadium: Sportplatz Klaus Seebacher

29 July 2021 Friendly	VfL Bochum	1–2	Vitesse	Germany
16:30 CEST (UTC+2)

31 July 2021 Friendly	VfL Bochum	0–2	FC Utrecht	Bochum, Germany
15:30 CEST (UTC+2)	Soares (yellow card)		Boussaid (yellow card); Ramselaar 44', 69'	Stadium: Vonovia Ruhrstadion; Attendance: 4,000; Referee: Niklas Dardenne

27 January 2022 Friendly	VfL Bochum	0–2	Fortuna Düsseldorf	Bochum, Germany
14:00 CET (UTC+1)		Report	Peterson 62', 75'	Stadium: Vonovia Ruhrstadion; Attendance: 0

25 March 2022 Friendly	VfL Bochum	2–0	Heracles Almelo	Bochum, Germany
13:00 CET (UTC+1)	Löwen 47'; Bonga 65'			Stadium: Vonovia Ruhrstadion; Attendance: 0

== Competitions ==
=== Overall record ===
Competition	First match	Last match	Starting round	Final position	Record							
Competition	First match	Last match	Starting round	Final position	Pld	W	D	L	GF	GA	GD	Win %
Bundesliga	14 August 2021	14 May 2022	Matchday 1	13th	34	12	6	16	38	52	−14	35.29
DFB-Pokal	7 August 2021	2 March 2022	First round	Quarter-finals	4	2	1	1	8	6	+2	50.00
Total					38	14	7	17	46	58	−12	36.84

Source: Soccerway

=== Bundesliga ===
==== League table ====
Pos	Team	Pld	W	D	L	GF	GA	GD	Pts	Qualification or relegation
11	Eintracht Frankfurt	34	10	12	12	45	49	−4	42	Qualification for the Champions League group stage (Note: Eintracht Frankfurt qualified for the Champions League group stage by winning the UEFA Europa League.)
12	VfL Wolfsburg	34	12	6	16	43	54	−11	42	
13	VfL Bochum	34	12	6	16	38	52	−14	42	
14	FC Augsburg	34	10	8	16	39	56	−17	38	
15	VfB Stuttgart	34	7	12	15	41	59	−18	33	

Source: DFB
Rules for classification: 1) Points; 2) Goal difference; 3) Goals scored; 4) Head-to-head results; 5) Head-to-head away goals scored; 6) Away goals scored; 7) Play-off.

==== Results summary ====
Overall								Home						Away					
Pld	W	D	L	GF	GA	GD	Pts	W	D	L	GF	GA	GD	W	D	L	GF	GA	GD
34	12	6	16	38	52	−14	42	8	4	5	21	17	+4	4	2	11	17	35	−18

Source: DFB

==== Results by round ====
Round	1	2	3	4	5	6	7	8	9	10	11	12	13	14	15	16	17	18	19	20	21	22	23	24	25	26	27	28	29	30	31	32	33	34
Ground	A	H	A	H	A	H	A	A	H	A	H	A	H	A	H	A	H	H	A	H	A	H	A	H	H	A	H	A	H	A	H	A	H	A
Result	L	W	L	L	L	D	L	W	W	L	W	L	W	W	D	L	L	W	L	D	D	W	D	L	W	L	L	W	D	L	L	W	W	L
Position	13	9	11	13	17	17	17	15	14	14	12	13	13	10	10	12	12	11	11	11	11	11	11	11	11	11	12	11	12	12	13	12	11	13

Source: DFB
A = Away; H = Home; W = Win; D = Draw; L = Loss

==== Matches ====
The league fixtures were announced on 25 June 2021.

14 August 2021 1	VfL Wolfsburg	1–0	VfL Bochum	Wolfsburg
15:30 CEST (UTC+2)	Weghorst (penalty missed) 5', 22'	Report	Tesche (red card) 4'; Leitsch (yellow card) 29'; Rexhbeçaj (yellow card) 88'	Stadium: Volkswagen Arena; Attendance: 8,536; Referee: Frank Willenborg

21 August 2021 2	VfL Bochum	2–0	Mainz 05	Bochum
15:30 CEST (UTC+2)	Holtmann 21'; Rexhbeçaj (yellow card) 54'; Polter 56'; Riemann (yellow card) 87'; Asano (yellow card) 90+3'; Zoller (yellow card) 90+4'	Report	Boëtius (yellow card) 56'; Barreiro (yellow card) 67'; Kohr (yellow card) 89'	Stadium: Vonovia Ruhrstadion; Attendance: 12,548; Referee: Patrick Ittrich

28 August 2021 3	1. FC Köln	2–1	VfL Bochum	Cologne
15:30 CEST (UTC+2)	Schaub 82'; Lemperle 90+1'	Report	Zoller (yellow card) 55', (goal) 90+4'	Stadium: RheinEnergieStadion; Attendance: 25,000; Referee: Benjamin Cortus

12 September 2021 4	VfL Bochum	1–3	Hertha BSC	Bochum
17:30 CEST (UTC+2)	Zoller 59'	Report	Serdar 37', 43'; Tousart (yellow card) 47'; Mittelstädt (yellow card) 54'; Zeefuik (yellow card) 75'; Maolida 78'	Stadium: Vonovia Ruhrstadion; Attendance: 14,000; Referee: Robert Schröder

18 September 2021 5	Bayern Munich	7–0	VfL Bochum	Munich
15:30 CEST (UTC+2)	Sané 17'; Kimmich 27', 65'; Gnabry 32'; Lampropoulos 43' (o.g.); Stanišić (yellow card) 52'; Lewandowski 61'; Choupo-Moting 79'	Report	Stafylidis (yellow card) 35'	Stadium: Allianz Arena; Attendance: 25,000; Referee: Tobias Welz

26 September 2021 6	VfL Bochum	0–0	VfB Stuttgart	Bochum
15:30 CEST (UTC+2)	Bella-Kotchap (yellow card) 38'; Mašović (yellow card) 75'	Report	Sosa (yellow card) 14'; Klimowicz (yellow card) 19'; Al Ghaddioui (yellow card) 43'; Endo (yellow card) 58'; Coulibaly (yellow card) 63'	Stadium: Vonovia Ruhrstadion; Attendance: 15,300; Referee: Christian Dingert

2 October 2021 7	RB Leipzig	3–0	VfL Bochum	Leipzig
18:30 CEST (UTC+2)	Angeliño (yellow card) 58'; Silva 69'; Nkunku 73', 78'	Report	Tesche (yellow card) 80'	Stadium: Red Bull Arena; Attendance: 25,598; Referee: Robert Hartmann

16 October 2021 8	Greuther Fürth	0–1	VfL Bochum	Fürth
15:30 CEST (UTC+2)	Seguin (yellow card) 30'; Itten (yellow card) 67'	Report	Riemann (yellow card) 54'; Losilla (yellow card) 60', (goal) 80'; Mašović (yellow card) 65'; Lampropoulos (yellow card) 75'	Stadium: Sportpark Ronhof; Attendance: 10,586; Referee: Bastian Dankert

24 October 2021 9	VfL Bochum	2–0	Eintracht Frankfurt	Bochum
19:30 CEST (UTC+2)	Blum 3'; Polter 90+2'	Report	Paciência (penalty missed) 11'; Sow (yellow card) 45+1'; Kostić (yellow card) 73'	Stadium: Vonovia Ruhrstadion; Attendance: 19,510; Referee: Marco Fritz

31 October 2021 10	Borussia Mönchengladbach	2–1	VfL Bochum	Mönchengladbach
17:30 CET (UTC+1)	Pléa 12'; Hofmann 40'; Wolf (yellow card) 85'	Report	Mašović (yellow card) 51'; Blum 86'	Stadium: Borussia-Park; Attendance: 42,361; Referee: Tobias Reichel

6 November 2021 11	VfL Bochum	2–0	1899 Hoffenheim	Bochum
15:30 CET (UTC+1)	Stafylidis (yellow card) 53'; Novothny 66'; Riemann (penalty missed) 75'; Pantović 90+7'	Report	Posch (yellow card) 29'; Vogt (yellow card) 38'; Grillitsch (yellow card) 73'; Kramarić (yellow card) 75'; Rudy (yellow card) 78'	Stadium: Vonovia Ruhrstadion; Attendance: 19,600; Referee: Frank Willenborg

20 November 2021 12	Bayer Leverkusen	1–0	VfL Bochum	Leverkusen
15:30 CET (UTC+1)	Adli 4', (yellow card) 87'; Frimpong (yellow card) 30'; Diaby (yellow card) 49'	Report	Mašović (yellow card) 63'; Soares (yellow card) 90+1'	Stadium: BayArena; Attendance: 22,538; Referee: Daniel Schlager

27 November 2021 13	VfL Bochum	2–1	SC Freiburg	Bochum
15:30 CET (UTC+1)	Losilla (yellow card) 32'; Polter 54'; Pantović 82'; Antwi-Adjei (yellow card) 90+1'	Report	Lienhart 51'; Kübler (yellow card) 58'	Stadium: Vonovia Ruhrstadion; Attendance: 19,700; Referee: Patrick Ittrich

4 December 2021 14	FC Augsburg	2–3	VfL Bochum	Augsburg
15:30 CET (UTC+1)	Gregoritsch 58'; Caligiuri 86' (pen.)	Report	Polter 23', 45+2'; Soares (yellow card) 36'; Holtmann 40'; Rexhbeçaj (yellow card) 87'	Stadium: WWK Arena; Attendance: 0 Referee: Deniz Aytekin

11 December 2021 15	VfL Bochum	1–1	Borussia Dortmund	Bochum
15:30 CET (UTC+1)	Polter 40' (pen.)	Report	Schulz (yellow card) 57'; Hummels (yellow card) 58'; Brandt 85'; Zagadou (yellow card) 90'	Stadium: Vonovia Ruhrstadion; Attendance: 13,799; Referee: Matthias Jöllenbeck

14 December 2021 16	Arminia Bielefeld	2–0	VfL Bochum	Bielefeld
20:30 CET (UTC+1)	Okugawa 51'; Wimmer (yellow card) 62', (goal) 69'; Kunze (yellow card) 81'	Report	Polter (yellow card) 26'; Pantović (yellow card) 26'	Stadium: Bielefelder Alm; Attendance: 13,750; Referee: Benjamin Brand

18 December 2021 17	VfL Bochum	0–1	Union Berlin	Bochum
15:30 CET (UTC+1)	Mašović (yellow card) 20'; Soares (yellow card) 70'	Report	Kruse 16'	Stadium: Vonovia Ruhrstadion; Attendance: 13,500; Referee: Tobias Reichel

9 January 2022 18	VfL Bochum	1–0	VfL Wolfsburg	Bochum
17:30 CET (UTC+1)	Pantović 65'; Soares (yellow card) 80'	Report	Waldschmidt (yellow card) 33'; Steffen (yellow card) 87'	Stadium: Vonovia Ruhrstadion; Attendance: 0 Referee: Daniel Schlager

15 January 2022 19	Mainz 05	1–0	VfL Bochum	Mainz
15:30 CET (UTC+1)	St. Juste 48'; Stach (yellow card) 55'; Stöger (yellow card) 85'; Nebel (yellow card) 86'	Report	Polter (penalty missed) 32'; Bella-Kotchap (yellow card) 70'; Gamboa (yellow card) 76'; Rexhbeçaj (yellow card) 89'	Stadium: Opel Arena; Attendance: 1,000; Referee: Frank Willenborg

22 January 2022 20	VfL Bochum	2–2	1. FC Köln	Bochum
18:30 CET (UTC+1)	Holtmann 25'; Asano 70'	Report	Hübers 36'; Modeste 45'; Hector (yellow card) 60'; Horn (yellow card) 85'; Uth (yellow card) 90+2'	Stadium: Vonovia Ruhrstadion; Attendance: 0 Referee: Matthias Jöllenbeck

4 February 2022 21	Hertha BSC	1–1	VfL Bochum	Berlin
20:30 CET (UTC+1)	Belfodil 23'; Ekkelenkamp (yellow card) 56'; Mittelstädt (yellow card) 84'; Richter (yellow card) 86'	Report	Polter 48'; Bella-Kotchap (yellow card) 85'	Stadium: Olympiastadion; Attendance: 3,000; Referee: Marco Fritz

12 February 2022 22	VfL Bochum	4–2	Bayern Munich	Bochum
15:30 CET (UTC+1)	Antwi-Adjei 14'; Locadia 38' (pen.); Gamboa 40', (yellow card) 58'; Holtmann 44'; Rexhbeçaj (yellow card) 74'	Report	Lewandowski 9', 75'; Pavard (yellow card) 90'	Stadium: Vonovia Ruhrstadion; Attendance: 8,500; Referee: Robert Schröder

19 February 2022 23	VfB Stuttgart	1–1	VfL Bochum	Stuttgart
15:30 CET (UTC+1)	Bella-Kotchap 56' (o.g.)	Report	Osterhage (yellow card) 23'; Antwi-Adjei (yellow card) 60'; Gamboa (yellow card) 64'; Polter (yellow card) 90'; Löwen 90+4' (pen.)	Stadium: Mercedes-Benz Arena; Attendance: 20,059; Referee: Harm Osmers

27 February 2022 24	VfL Bochum	0–1	RB Leipzig	Bochum
15:30 CET (UTC+1)	Gamboa (yellow card) 87'	Report	Simakan (yellow card) 71'; Nkunku 82'	Stadium: Vonovia Ruhrstadion; Attendance: 10,000; Referee: Felix Brych

5 March 2022 25	VfL Bochum	2–1	Greuther Fürth	Bochum
15:30 CET (UTC+1)	Leitsch 35'; Gamboa (yellow card) 44'; Losilla 71'; Pantović (yellow card) 82'	Report	Griesbeck (yellow card) 34'; Itter (yellow card) 39'; Hrgota (yellow card) 53'; Bella-Kotchap 64' (o.g.); Willems (yellow card) 73'	Stadium: Vonovia Ruhrstadion; Attendance: 19,800; Referee: Daniel Schlager

13 March 2022 26	Eintracht Frankfurt	2–1	VfL Bochum	Frankfurt
17:30 CET (UTC+1)	Sow (yellow card) 25'; Mašović 46' (o.g.); Kamada 52'; Borré (yellow card) 73'; Paciência (yellow card) 90+3'	Report	Polter 19'; Losilla (yellow card) 30'; Osterhage (yellow card) 45+1'; Bockhorn (yellow card) 65'; Bella-Kotchap (yellow card) 90+3'	Stadium: Deutsche Bank Park; Attendance: 24,000; Referee: Marco Fritz

18 March 2022 27	VfL Bochum	0–2	Borussia Mönchengladbach	Bochum
20:30 CET (UTC+1)	Mašović (yellow card) 29'; Bella-Kotchap (yellow card) 32'	Report	Koné (yellow card) 8'; Pléa 55'; Embolo 61'	Stadium: Vonovia Ruhrstadion; Attendance: 25,000; Referee: Benjamin Cortus
Note: The match was abandoned after 69 minutes and a score of 0–2 after an assistant referee was hit by a beer cup. On 24 March, the DFB Sports Court awarded the match as a 2–0 win for Borussia Mönchengladbach.

2 April 2022 28	1899 Hoffenheim	1–2	VfL Bochum	Sinsheim
15:30 CEST (UTC+2)	Akpoguma (yellow card) 45+1'; Raum (yellow card) 51', (goal) 54'; Vogt (yellow card) 90+2'	Report	Asano 28', 59'; Stafylidis (yellow card) 63'; Leitsch (yellow card) 80'	Stadium: Rhein-Neckar-Arena; Attendance: 15,014; Referee: Daniel Siebert

10 April 2022 29	VfL Bochum	0–0	Bayer Leverkusen	Bochum
15:30 CEST (UTC+2)		Report	Diaby (penalty missed) 65'	Stadium: Vonovia Ruhrstadion; Attendance: 25,000; Referee: Felix Zwayer

16 April 2022 30	SC Freiburg	3–0	VfL Bochum	Freiburg
15:30 CEST (UTC+2)	Kübler 5'; Sallai 16', 53'	Report	Stafylidis (red card) 68'	Stadium: Europa-Park Stadion; Attendance: 34,000; Referee: Sascha Stegemann

24 April 2022 31	VfL Bochum	0–2	FC Augsburg	Bochum
15:30 CEST (UTC+2)	Gamboa (yellow card) 90+6'	Report	Hahn 15'; Gregoritsch 43' (pen.); Dorsch (yellow card) 47'; Valentin (yellow card) 84'; Gouweleeuw (yellow card) 90+6'	Stadium: Vonovia Ruhrstadion; Attendance: 23,500; Referee: Bastian Dankert

30 April 2022 32	Borussia Dortmund	3–4	VfL Bochum	Dortmund
15:30 CEST (UTC+2)	Haaland 18' (pen.), 30' (pen.), 62'; Bellingham (yellow card) 24'; Brandt (yellow card) 55'; Rothe (yellow card) 89'; Papadopoulos (yellow card) 90+3'	Report	Polter 3'; Holtmann 8'; Losilla (yellow card) 31'; Mašović (yellow card) 35'; Locadia 81'; Pantović 85' (pen.); Zoller (yellow card) 90+2'	Stadium: Signal Iduna Park; Attendance: 81,365; Referee: Robert Hartmann

6 May 2022 33	VfL Bochum	2–1	Arminia Bielefeld	Bochum
20:30 CEST (UTC+2)	Polter 22'; Bello 89' (o.g.)	Report	Nilsson 35'	Stadium: Vonovia Ruhrstadion; Attendance: 25,000; Referee: Robert Schröder

14 May 2022 34	Union Berlin	3–2	VfL Bochum	Berlin
15:30 CEST (UTC+2)	Prömel 5'; Awoniyi 25' (pen.), 88', (yellow card) 89'; Michel (yellow card) 44'; Trimmel (yellow card) 75'	Report	Tesche (yellow card) 24'; Losilla (yellow card) 28'; Zoller 55'; Löwen 79'	Stadium: Stadion An der Alten Försterei; Attendance: 22,012; Referee: Marco Fritz

=== DFB-Pokal ===
7 August 2021 First round	Wuppertaler SV	1–2 (a.e.t.)	VfL Bochum	Wuppertal
15:30 CEST (UTC+2)	Šarić 23'; Rodrigues-Pires (yellow card) 73' (yellow-red card) 120'; Salau (yellow card) 100'	Report	Tesche (yellow card) 44', (goal) 111'; Zoller 53'; Leitsch (yellow card) 71'; Pantović (yellow card) 118'	Stadium: Stadion am Zoo; Attendance: 4,490; Referee: Patrick Alt

27 October 2021 Second round	VfL Bochum	2–2 (a.e.t.) (5–4 p)	FC Augsburg	Bochum
18:30 CEST (UTC+2)	Pantović 12', 53'; Polter (yellow card) 105'	Report	Strobl (yellow card) 48'; Oxford 56'; Hahn (yellow card) 57'; Vargas 58'; Zeqiri (yellow card) 65'; Gregoritsch (yellow card) 92'	Stadium: Vonovia Ruhrstadion; Attendance: 15,220; Referee: Martin Petersen
	Penalties
	Rexhbeçaj (penalty scored); Mašović (penalty scored); Blum (penalty scored); Polter (penalty scored); Riemann (penalty scored)		(penalty scored) Gouweleeuw; (penalty scored) Finnbogason; (penalty scored) Strobl; (penalty scored) Gregoritsch; (penalty missed) Maier

18 January 2022 Round of 16	VfL Bochum	3–1	Mainz 05	Bochum
20:45 CET (UTC+1)	Pantović 56' (pen.), 59'; Löwen 80'	Report	Lee (yellow card) 14'; Onisiwo 36'; Barreiro (yellow card) 55'; Bell (yellow card) 65'; Stach (yellow card) 75'	Stadium: Vonovia Ruhrstadion; Attendance: 750; Referee: Felix Brych

2 March 2022 Quarter-finals	VfL Bochum	1–2 (a.e.t.)	SC Freiburg	Bochum
20:45 CET (UTC+1)	Polter 64', (yellow card) 117'	Report	Petersen 51'; Kübler (yellow card) 117'; Sallai 120'	Stadium: Vonovia Ruhrstadion; Attendance: 10,000; Referee: Robert Schröder

== Statistics ==
As of 14 May 2022

No.	Pos	Nat	Player	Total		Bundesliga		DFB-Pokal	
No.	Pos	Nat	Player	Apps	Goals	Apps	Goals	Apps	Goals
1	GK	(Germany) GER	Manuel Riemann	35	0	31	0	3+1	0
2	DF	(Costa Rica) CRC	Cristian Gamboa	27	1	20+3	1	3+1	0
3	DF	(Brazil) BRA	Danilo Soares	34	0	30	0	3+1	0
4	DF	(Serbia) SRB	Erhan Mašović	22	0	17+3	0	1+1	0
5	DF	(Switzerland) SUI	Saulo Decarli	1	0	0+1	0	0	0
6	MF	(Germany) GER	Patrick Osterhage	15	0	6+7	0	2	0
7	FW	(Germany) GER	Danny Blum	14	2	2+11	2	0+1	0
8	MF	(France) FRA	Anthony Losilla (captain)	37	2	33	2	4	0
9	FW	(Germany) GER	Simon Zoller	11	4	6+4	3	1	1
10	FW	(Japan) JPN	Takuma Asano	31	3	20+7	3	2+2	0
11	DF	(Uganda) UGA	Herbert Bockhorn	18	0	7+11	0	0	0
14	FW	(Germany) GER	Tom Weilandt	0	0	0	0	0	0
16	DF	(Greece) GRE	Konstantinos Stafylidis	26	0	15+9	0	2	0
17	FW	(Philippines) PHI	Gerrit Holtmann	34	5	24+6	5	4	0
19	FW	(Netherlands) NED	Jürgen Locadia	13	2	4+7	2	2	0
20	MF	(Germany) GER	Elvis Rexhbeçaj	36	0	30+2	0	4	0
21	GK	(Germany) GER	Michael Esser	4	0	3	0	1	0
22	FW	(Ghana) GHA	Christopher Antwi-Adjei	28	1	11+14	1	1+2	0
23	MF	(Germany) GER	Robert Tesche	12	1	5+6	0	1	1
24	DF	(Greece) GRE	Vasilis Lampropoulos	15	0	13	0	0+2	0
27	FW	(Serbia) SRB	Miloš Pantović	32	8	18+10	4	2+2	4
28	FW	(Germany) GER	Luis Hartwig	1	0	0+1	0	0	0
29	DF	(Germany) GER	Maxim Leitsch	22	1	17+2	1	3	0
32	FW	(Germany) GER	Tarsis Bonga	3	0	0+3	0	0	0
34	GK	(Germany) GER	Paul Grave	0	0	0	0	0	0
35	FW	(Republic of the Congo) CGO	Silvère Ganvoula	10	0	0+9	0	0+1	0
37	DF	(Germany) GER	Armel Bella-Kotchap	26	0	20+2	0	4	0
38	MF	(Germany) GER	Eduard Löwen	28	3	15+11	2	0+2	1
40	FW	(Germany) GER	Sebastian Polter	36	11	27+6	10	1+2	1
	MF	(Ghana) GHA	Raman Chibsah	0	0	0	0	0	0
	FW	(Azerbaijan) AZE	Baris Ekincier	0	0	0	0	0	0
	FW	(Hungary) HUN	Soma Novothny	6	1	0+6	1	0	0

=== Goalscorers ===
As of 14 May 2022

Rank	No.	Pos	Nat	Name	Bundesliga	DFB-Pokal	Total
1	40	FW	(Germany)	Sebastian Polter	10	1	11
2	27	FW	(Serbia)	Miloš Pantović	4	4	8
3	17	FW	(Philippines)	Gerrit Holtmann	5	0	5
4	9	FW	(Germany)	Simon Zoller	3	1	4
5	10	FW	(Japan)	Takuma Asano	3	0	3
5	38	MF	(Germany)	Eduard Löwen	2	1	3
7	7	FW	(Germany)	Danny Blum	2	0	2
7	8	MF	(France)	Anthony Losilla	2	0	2
7	19	FW	(Netherlands)	Jürgen Locadia	2	0	2
11	2	DF	(Costa Rica)	Cristian Gamboa	1	0	1
11	15	FW	(Hungary)	Soma Novothny	1	0	1
11	22	FW	(Ghana)	Christopher Antwi-Adjei	1	0	1
11	23	MF	(Germany)	Robert Tesche	0	1	1
11	29	DF	(Germany)	Maxim Leitsch	1	0	1
Own goals					1	0	1
Totals					38	8	46
