= 2019–20 VfL Bochum season =

VfL Bochum
2019–20 season
- Chairman: Hans-Peter Villis
- Manager: Robin Dutt (until 26 August 2019); Heiko Butscher (ad interim, until 6 September 2019); Thomas Reis (since 6 September 2019)
- Stadium: Vonovia-Ruhrstadion
- 2. Bundesliga: 8th
- DFB-Pokal: Second round
- Top goalscorer: League: Silvère Ganvoula (13); All: Silvère Ganvoula (16)
- Highest home attendance: 24,421 (vs Hamburger SV, 3 February 2020)
- Lowest home attendance: 13,807 (vs SV Sandhausen, 1 March 2020) (Note: Due to the COVID-19 pandemic in Germany the last four home matches (vs Heidenheim, Kiel, St. Pauli and Fürth) had to be played without an audience.)
- Average home league attendance: 17,319 (Note: Average home league attendance does not include the last four home matches played without an audience. These four matches would lower the average from 17,319 to 13,244.)
Home colours	Away colours

The 2019–20 VfL Bochum season was the 82nd season in club history.

== Review and events ==
On 26 August 2019 head coach Robin Dutt was sacked and replaced by caretaker Heiko Butscher. Butscher's tenure as caretaker ended on 6 September 2019, when the VfL Bochum announced signing Thomas Reis as head coach.

== Matches ==
=== Legend ===
Win Draw Loss

=== Friendly matches ===
29 June 2019 Friendly	FC Altenbochum	1–8	VfL Bochum	Bochum
15:00	Forcho Ogbonna 86'		Pantović 10', 36' (pen.); Blum 19'; Ekincier 21'; Osei-Tutu 49'; Maier 55'; Sağlam 65' (pen.); Zoller 68'	Stadium: Sportanlage Zur Burkuhle; Attendance: 1,000; Referee: Claas Steenebrügge (Bochum)

2 July 2019 Friendly	Concordia Wiemelhausen	3–6	VfL Bochum	Bochum
18:00	Kadiu 9'; Wasserloos 62'; Franke 87'		Pantović 9', 36'; Decarli 30'; Maier 41'; Lorenz 63'; Bapoh 72'	Stadium: Sportanlage Kemnader Straße; Attendance: 1,000; Referee: Lars Bramkamp (Hattingen)

3 July 2019 Friendly	Eintracht Grumme	0–15	VfL Bochum	Bochum
18:00			Ekincier 17'; Tesche 22', 32', 51'; Weilandt 23'; Sağlam 37' (pen.), 42'; Bapoh 38'; Lorenz 54'; Gyamfi 55'; Pantović 69', 85'; Frömming 74' (o.g.); Wellers 84'; Zoller 90'	Stadium: Sportanlage Feenstraße; Referee: Mario Tiller (Witten)

9 July 2019 Friendly	FC St. Gallen	3–0	VfL Bochum	St. Margrethen, Switzerland
18:30	Kchouk 41'; Bella-Kotchap 67' (o.g.); Kutesa 72'

12 July 2019 Friendly	Grasshopper Club Zürich	2–3	VfL Bochum	Gossau, Switzerland
18:00	Ben Khalifa 2'; Njie 57'		Blum 5'; Pantović 48'; Lorenz 84'	Stadium: Sportanlage Buchenwald

17 July 2019 Friendly	Barnsley F.C.	2–1	VfL Bochum	Marl
18:00	Woodrow 35'; Miller 86'		Weilandt 88'	Stadium: EVONIK Sportpark; Referee: Sven Waschitzki (Essen)

20 July 2019 Friendly	VfL Bochum	1–1	Hertha BSC	Bochum
18:00	Blum 22'		Duda 44'	Stadium: Vonovia-Ruhrstadion; Attendance: 7,500; Referee: Thorben Siewer (Drolshagen)

10 October 2019 Friendly	VfL Bochum	4–2	KFC Uerdingen 05	Bochum
15:00	Weilandt 10' (pen.), 65'; Eisfeld 44', 80'		Kinsombi 21'; Maroh 35'	Stadium: Leichtathletikplatz am Vonovia-Ruhrstadion; Attendance: 0

14 November 2019 Friendly	VfL Bochum	2–2	FC Viktoria Köln	Bochum
15:00	Blum 69'; Lee 89'		Handle 66', 80'	Stadium: Leichtathletikplatz am Vonovia-Ruhrstadion

15 January 2020 Friendly	Fehérvár FC	0–2	VfL Bochum	La Línea de la Concepción, Spain
16:00			Pantović 62' (pen.); Tesche 83'	Stadium: Estadio Municipal de La Línea de la Concepción

18 January 2020 Friendly	FC Dinamo București	1–1	VfL Bochum	La Línea de la Concepción, Spain
16:00	Sorescu 27'		Weilandt 64'	Stadium: Estadio Municipal de La Línea de la Concepción

22 January 2020 Friendly	VfL Bochum	2–0	KFC Uerdingen 05	Bochum
11:00	Blum 3'; Janelt 7'			Stadium: Leichtathletikplatz am Vonovia-Ruhrstadion

26 February 2020 Friendly	VfL Bochum	1–0	SC Preußen Münster	Bochum
	Žulj 24'			Stadium: Leichtathletikplatz am Vonovia-Ruhrstadion; Attendance: 0 Referee: Florian Exner (Beelen)

=== 2. Bundesliga ===
==== League table ====
Pos	Team	Pld	W	D	L	GF	GA	GD	Pts
6	Hannover 96	34	13	9	12	54	49	+5	48
7	Erzgebirge Aue	34	13	8	13	46	48	−2	47
8	VfL Bochum	34	11	13	10	53	51	+2	46
9	Greuther Fürth	34	11	11	12	46	45	+1	44
10	SV Sandhausen	34	10	13	11	43	45	−2	43

Source: DFB
Rules for classification: 1) Points; 2) Goal difference; 3) Goals scored; 4) Head-to-head points; 5) Head-to-head goal difference; 6) Head-to-head away goals scored; 7) Away goals scored; 8) Play-off.

==== Results summary ====
Overall								Home						Away					
Pld	W	D	L	GF	GA	GD	Pts	W	D	L	GF	GA	GD	W	D	L	GF	GA	GD
34	11	13	10	53	51	+2	46	6	8	3	37	30	+7	5	5	7	16	21	−5

==== Results by round ====
Round	1	2	3	4	5	6	7	8	9	10	11	12	13	14	15	16	17	18	19	20	21	22	23	24	25	26	27	28	29	30	31	32	33	34
Ground	A	H	A	H	A	H	A	H	A	H	A	H	A	H	H	A	H	H	A	H	A	H	A	H	A	H	A	H	A	H	A	A	H	A
Result	L	D	L	D	L	D	D	D	W	D	L	W	D	D	W	L	W	L	L	L	W	L	W	D	D	W	D	W	D	W	W	W	D	L
Position	16	14	16	17	17	17	17	17	15	16	16	16	16	15	13	14	11	14	14	16	14	15	13	15	15	12	12	10	10	8	6	6	6	8

A = Away; H = Home; W = Win; D = Draw; L = Loss

==== Matches ====
28 July 2019 1	SSV Jahn Regensburg	3–1	VfL Bochum	Regensburg
15:30	Saller 42'; Stolze 50'; Baack 90+5'		Blum 76' (pen.)	Stadium: Continental Arena; Attendance: 10,268; Referee: Robert Schröder (Hannover)

2 August 2019 2	VfL Bochum	3–3	Arminia Bielefeld	Bochum
18:30	Blum 74' (pen.); Ganvoula 79'; Zoller 85'		Voglsammer 54'; Klos 56'; Losilla 90+1' (o.g.)	Stadium: Vonovia-Ruhrstadion; Attendance: 21,708; Referee: Martin Petersen (Stuttgart)

16 August 2019 3	Hamburger SV	1–0	VfL Bochum	Hamburg
18:30	Hinterseer 60'			Stadium: Volksparkstadion; Attendance: 41,737; Referee: Christian Dingert (Thallichtenberg)

24 August 2019 4	VfL Bochum	3–3	SV Wehen Wiesbaden	Bochum
13:00	Bapoh 56'; Osei-Tutu 87'; Ganvoula 90' (pen.)		Schäffler 10', 45'; Dittgen 19'	Stadium: Vonovia-Ruhrstadion; Attendance: 14,189; Referee: Daniel Schlager (Rastatt)

2 September 2019 5	VfB Stuttgart	2–1	VfL Bochum	Stuttgart
20:30	Didavi 19'; González 48'		Ganvoula 40'	Stadium: Mercedes-Benz Arena; Attendance: 48,624; Referee: Manuel Gräfe (Berlin)

15 September 2019 6	VfL Bochum	2–2	Dynamo Dresden	Bochum
13:30	Blum 79'; Losilla 85'		Jeremejeff 47'; Koné 63'	Stadium: Vonovia-Ruhrstadion; Attendance: 16,859; Referee: Christof Günsch (Marburg)

21 September 2019 7	SV Sandhausen	1–1	VfL Bochum	Sandhausen
13:00	Bouhaddouz 88'		Ganvoula 57'	Stadium: Hardtwaldstadion; Attendance: 5,339; Referee: Pascal Müller (Löchgau)

28 September 2019 8	VfL Bochum	2–2	SV Darmstadt 98	Bochum
13:00	Ganvoula 10' (pen.), 25'		Höhn 13', 85'	Stadium: Vonovia-Ruhrstadion; Attendance: 14,321; Referee: René Rohde (Rostock)

6 October 2019 9	1. FC Heidenheim	2–3	VfL Bochum	Heidenheim an der Brenz
13:30	Leipertz 23'; Schimmer 90+3'		Zoller 7'; Blum 14'; Ganvoula 49'	Stadium: Voith-Arena; Attendance: 10,350; Referee: Michael Bacher (Amerang-Kirchensur)

20 October 2019 10	VfL Bochum	3–3	Karlsruher SC	Bochum
13:30	Decarli 10'; Blum 29' (pen.); Gamboa 31'		Hofmann 8'; Choi 21'; Fink 90+1'	Stadium: Vonovia-Ruhrstadion; Attendance: 14,945; Referee: Nicolas Winter (Düsseldorf)

25 October 2019 11	Holstein Kiel	2–1	VfL Bochum	Kiel
18:30	Lee 9'; Serra 52'		Ganvoula 38' (pen.)	Stadium: Holstein-Stadion; Attendance: 12,359; Referee: Timo Gerach (Landau)

4 November 2019 12	VfL Bochum	3–1	1. FC Nuremberg	Bochum
20:30	Soares 9'; Lorenz 40'; Wintzheimer 45'		Sørensen 63'	Stadium: Vonovia-Ruhrstadion; Attendance: 16,045; Referee: Matthias Jöllenbeck (Freiburg)

8 November 2019 13	FC St. Pauli	1–1	VfL Bochum	Hamburg
18:30	Sobota 10'		Zoller 5'	Stadium: Millerntor-Stadion; Attendance: 29,546; Referee: Florian Badstübner (Windsbach)

22 November 2019 14	VfL Bochum	1–1	VfL Osnabrück	Bochum
18:30	Blum 2'		Schmidt 45+2' (pen.)	Stadium: Vonovia-Ruhrstadion; Attendance: 20,768; Referee: Benedikt Kempkes (Thür)

30 November 2019 15	VfL Bochum	2–0	FC Erzgebirge Aue	Bochum
13:00	Losilla 61'; Samson 90+4' (o.g.)			Stadium: Vonovia-Ruhrstadion; Attendance: 14,794; Referee: Patrick Alt (Illingen)

7 December 2019 16	SpVgg Greuther Fürth	3–1	VfL Bochum	Fürth
14:00	Hrgota 17', 87'; Leweling 90+4'		Ganvoula 70'	Stadium: Sportpark Ronhof; Attendance: 8,875; Referee: Nicolas Winter (Düsseldorf)

13 December 2019 17	VfL Bochum	2–1	Hannover 96	Bochum
18:30	Wintzheimer 14'; Zoller 28'		Ducksch 66'	Stadium: Vonovia-Ruhrstadion; Attendance: 16,519; Referee: Florian Badstübner (Windsbach)

22 December 2019 18	VfL Bochum	2–3	SSV Jahn Regensburg	Bochum
13:30	Ganvoula 42'; Losilla 83'		Stolze 15', 64'; Albers 32'	Stadium: Vonovia-Ruhrstadion; Attendance: 18,679; Referee: Tobias Reichel (Stuttgart)

28 January 2020 19	Arminia Bielefeld	2–0	VfL Bochum	Bielefeld
18:30	Voglsammer 27'; Klos 90+3'			Stadium: Alm; Attendance: 19,685; Referee: Robert Kempter (Stockach)

3 February 2020 20	VfL Bochum	1–3	Hamburger SV	Bochum
20:30	Zoller 65'		Leibold 68'; Pohjanpalo 74'; Kittel 87'	Stadium: Vonovia-Ruhrstadion; Attendance: 24,421; Referee: Daniel Schlager (Hügelsheim)

9 February 2020 21	SV Wehen Wiesbaden	0–1	VfL Bochum	Wiesbaden
13:30			Zoller 39'	Stadium: BRITA-Arena; Attendance: 5,373; Referee: Daniel Siebert (Berlin)

17 February 2020 22	VfL Bochum	0–1	VfB Stuttgart	Bochum
20:30			Al Ghaddioui 80'	Stadium: Vonovia-Ruhrstadion; Attendance: 18,090; Referee: Frank Willenborg (Osnabrück)

22 February 2020 23	Dynamo Dresden	1–2	VfL Bochum	Dresden
13:00	Nikolaou 70'		Ganvoula 65'; Janelt 90+3'	Stadium: Stadion Dresden; Attendance: 26,279; Referee: Lasse Koslowski (Berlin)

1 March 2020 24	VfL Bochum	4–4	SV Sandhausen	Bochum
13:30	Blum 6' (pen.), 8', 49'; Osei-Tutu 65'		Biada 13', 45'; Behrens 85' (pen.); Türpitz 90+4' (pen.)	Stadium: Vonovia-Ruhrstadion; Attendance: 13,807; Referee: Johann Pfeifer (Hameln)

7 March 2020 25	SV Darmstadt 98	0–0	VfL Bochum	Darmstadt
13:00				Stadium: Stadion am Böllenfalltor; Attendance: 15,125; Referee: Tobias Reichel (Stuttgart)

16 May 2020 26	VfL Bochum	3–0	1. FC Heidenheim	Bochum
13:00	Losilla 11'; Osei-Tutu 34'; Ganvoula 64'			Stadium: Vonovia-Ruhrstadion; Attendance: 0 (Note: Due to the COVID-19 pandemic in Germany no audience was allowed to be present by local authorities.); Referee: Florian Heft (Neuenkirchen)
Note: The match was postponed and rescheduled due to the pandemic of COVID-19 in Germany.

24 May 2020 27	Karlsruher SC	0–0	VfL Bochum	Karlsruhe
13:30				Stadium: Wildparkstadion; Attendance: 0 Referee: Tobias Welz (Wiesbaden)
Note: The match was postponed and rescheduled due to the pandemic of COVID-19 in Germany.

27 May 2020 28	VfL Bochum	2–1	Holstein Kiel	Bochum
18:30	Osei-Tutu 49'; Ganvoula 63'		Meffert 74'	Stadium: Vonovia-Ruhrstadion; Attendance: 0 Referee: Guido Winkmann (Kerken)
Note: The match was postponed and rescheduled due to the pandemic of COVID-19 in Germany.

30 May 2020 29	1. FC Nuremberg	0–0	VfL Bochum	Nuremberg
13:00				Stadium: Grundig-Stadion; Attendance: 0 Referee: Alexander Sather (Grimma)
Note: The match was postponed and rescheduled due to the pandemic of COVID-19 in Germany.

5 June 2020 30	VfL Bochum	2–0	FC St. Pauli	Bochum
18:30	Žulj 15' (pen.); Leitsch 73'			Stadium: Vonovia-Ruhrstadion; Attendance: 0 Referee: Florian Heft (Neuenkirchen)
Note: The match was postponed and rescheduled due to the pandemic of COVID-19 in Germany.

13 June 2020 31	VfL Osnabrück	0–2	VfL Bochum	Osnabrück
13:00			Gugganig 22' (o.g.); Wintzheimer 68'	Stadium: Stadion an der Bremer Brücke; Attendance: 0 Referee: Bibiana Steinhaus (Langenhagen)
Note: The match was postponed and rescheduled due to the pandemic of COVID-19 in Germany.

17 June 2020 32	FC Erzgebirge Aue	1–2	VfL Bochum	Aue
18:30	Kupusović 90+5'		Eisfeld 29'; Losilla 42'	Stadium: Erzgebirgsstadion; Attendance: 0 Referee: Lasse Koslowski (Berlin)
Note: The match was postponed and rescheduled due to the pandemic of COVID-19 in Germany.

21 June 2020 33	VfL Bochum	2–2	SpVgg Greuther Fürth	Bochum
15:30	Tesche 43'; Osei-Tutu 52'		Hrgota 7'; Ernst 79'	Stadium: Vonovia-Ruhrstadion; Attendance: 0 Referee: Martin Petersen (Stuttgart)
Note: The match was postponed and rescheduled due to the pandemic of COVID-19 in Germany.

28 June 2020 34	Hannover 96	2–0	VfL Bochum	Hannover
15:30	Ducksch 45', 84'			Stadium: HDI-Arena; Attendance: 0 Referee: René Rohde (Rostock)
Note: The match was postponed and rescheduled due to the pandemic of COVID-19 in Germany.

=== DFB-Pokal ===
10 August 2019 R1	KSV Baunatal	2–3	VfL Bochum	Baunatal
18:30	Blahout 32'; Schrader 45+2'		Ganvoula 18' (pen.), 70', 73'	Stadium: Parkstadion; Attendance: 5,748; Referee: Wolfgang Haslberger (Sankt Wolfgang)

29 October 2019 R2	VfL Bochum	1–2	FC Bayern Munich	Bochum
20:00	Davies 36' (o.g.)		Gnabry 83'; Müller 89'	Stadium: Vonovia-Ruhrstadion; Attendance: 26,600; Referee: Robert Schröder (Hannover)

== Squad ==
=== Squad and statistics ===
==== Squad, appearances and goals scored ====
As of 28 June 2020

No.	Pos	Nat	Player	Total		2. Bundesliga		DFB-Pokal	
No.	Pos	Nat	Player	Apps	Goals	Apps	Goals	Apps	Goals
1	GK	(Germany) GER	Manuel Riemann	34	0	32	0	2	0
2	DF	(Germany) GER	Tim Hoogland (until 9 August 2019)	0	0	0	0	0	0
2	DF	(Costa Rica) CRC	Cristian Gamboa (since 27 August 2019)	26	1	26	1	0	0
3	DF	(Brazil) BRA	Danilo Soares	34	1	32	1	2	0
4	DF	(Germany) GER	Simon Lorenz	17	1	16	1	1	0
5	DF	(Switzerland) SUI	Saulo Decarli	23	1	22	1	1	0
6	DF	(England) ENG	Jordi Osei-Tutu	22	5	21	5	1	0
7	MF	(Germany) GER	Sebastian Maier	16	0	15	0	1	0
8	MF	(France) FRA	Anthony Losilla (captain)	35	5	33	5	2	0
9	FW	(Germany) GER	Simon Zoller	25	6	23	6	2	0
10	MF	(Germany) GER	Thomas Eisfeld	12	1	11	1	1	0
11	MF	(South Korea) KOR	Chung-yong Lee (until 3 March 2020)	14	0	12	0	2	0
14	FW	(Germany) GER	Tom Weilandt	23	0	22	0	1	0
15	DF	(Germany) GER	Maxwell Gyamfi	0	0	0	0	0	0
17	FW	(Germany) GER	Danny Blum	26	9	25	9	1	0
18	FW	(Germany) GER	Manuel Wintzheimer (since 2 September 2019)	21	3	20	3	1	0
19	DF	(Germany) GER	Patrick Fabian	4	0	4	0	0	0
20	MF	(Germany) GER	Vitaly Janelt	24	1	24	1	0	0
21	DF	(Germany) GER	Stefano Celozzi	9	0	8	0	1	0
22	DF	(Austria) AUT	Dominik Baumgartner (until 2 September 2019)	1	0	0	0	1	0
23	MF	(Germany) GER	Robert Tesche	26	0	25	0	1	0
24	DF	(Greece) GRE	Vasilis Lampropoulos (since 31 January 2020)	10	0	10	0	0	0
25	GK	(Germany) GER	Patrick Drewes	2	0	2	0	0	0
26	MF	(Germany) GER	Görkem Sağlam (until 20 January 2020)	0	0	0	0	0	0
26	MF	(Germany) GER	Lars Holtkamp (since 14 November 2019)	0	0	0	0	0	0
27	FW	(Serbia) SRB	Miloš Pantović	21	0	20	0	1	0
28	FW	(Germany) GER	Ulrich Bapoh	5	1	4	1	1	0
29	DF	(Germany) GER	Maxim Leitsch	15	1	15	1	0	0
30	FW	(Azerbaijan) AZE	Baris Ekincier (until 18 July 2019)	0	0	0	0	0	0
32	MF	(Austria) AUT	Robert Žulj (since 15 January 2020)	11	1	11	1	0	0
33	DF	(Germany) GER	Moritz Römling	0	0	0	0	0	0
34	GK	(Germany) GER	Paul Grave	0	0	0	0	0	0
35	FW	(Republic of the Congo) CGO	Silvère Ganvoula	30	16	28	13	2	3
36	MF	(Germany) GER	Jan Wellers	0	0	0	0	0	0
37	DF	(Germany) GER	Armel Bella-Kotchap	14	0	12	0	2	0
38	DF	(Greece) GRE	Stylianos Kokovas	0	0	0	0	0	0
40	GK	(Germany) GER	Joshua Wehking (until 18 July 2019)	0	0	0	0	0	0
—	MF	(Germany) GER	Luis Hartwig (since 26 February 2020)	0	0	0	0	0	0

=== Transfers ===
As of 4 March 2020

==== Summer ====
In:

No.	Pos.	Nation	Player
2	DF	CRC	Cristian Gamboa (from (Scotland) Celtic F.C.)
4	DF	GER	Simon Lorenz (loan return from TSV 1860 Munich)
5	DF	SUI	Saulo Decarli (from (Belgium) Club Brugge)
6	DF	ENG	Jordi Osei-Tutu (on loan from (England) Arsenal F.C.)
15	DF	GER	Maxwell Gyamfi (from VfL Bochum U19)
17	FW	GER	Danny Blum (from Eintracht Frankfurt, previously on loan at (Spain) UD Las Palmas)
18	FW	GER	Manuel Wintzheimer (on loan from Hamburger SV)
25	GK	GER	Patrick Drewes (from Würzburger Kickers)
28	FW	GER	Ulrich Bapoh (loan return from (Netherlands) FC Twente)
35	FW	CGO	Silvère Ganvoula (from (Belgium) R.S.C. Anderlecht, previously on loan)

Out:

No.	Pos.	Nation	Player
2	DF	GER	Tim Hoogland (to (Australia) Melbourne Victory FC)
13	MF	GER	Sidney Sam (released)
16	FW	AUT	Lukas Hinterseer (to Hamburger SV)
17	MF	AUS	Robbie Kruse (to (Australia) Melbourne Victory FC)
18	DF	GER	Jan Gyamerah (to Hamburger SV)
22	DF	AUT	Dominik Baumgartner (on loan to (Austria) Wolfsberger AC)
25	MF	GER	Jannik Bandowski (to SpVgg Unterhaching)
30	FW	AZE	Baris Ekincier (on loan to SK Austria Klagenfurt)
31	DF	GER	Tom Baack (to SSV Jahn Regensburg)
32	GK	GER	Felix Dornebusch (released)
40	GK	GER	Joshua Wehking (to Hamburger SV II)
42	FW	TUR	Okan-Mete Yilmaz (to VfL Repelen)
43	FW	TUR	Ömer Uzun (to (Turkey) Kayserispor)
46	MF	GER	Michael Martin (released)
—	DF	GER	Phillip Aboagye (to SG Wattenscheid 09)
—	FW	GRE	Vangelis Pavlidis (to (Netherlands) Willem II Tilburg, previously on loan)
—	MF	GER	Furkan Sağman (to (Turkey) Sivasspor)

==== Winter ====
In:

No.	Pos.	Nation	Player
24	DF	GRE	Vasilis Lampropoulos (on loan from (Spain) Deportivo de La Coruña)
32	MF	AUT	Robert Žulj (from TSG 1899 Hoffenheim)

Out:

No.	Pos.	Nation	Player
11	MF	KOR	Chung-yong Lee (to (South Korea) Ulsan Hyundai FC)
26	MF	GER	Görkem Sağlam (to (Netherlands) Willem II Tilburg)
