= Silvère Ganvoula =

Congolese footballer

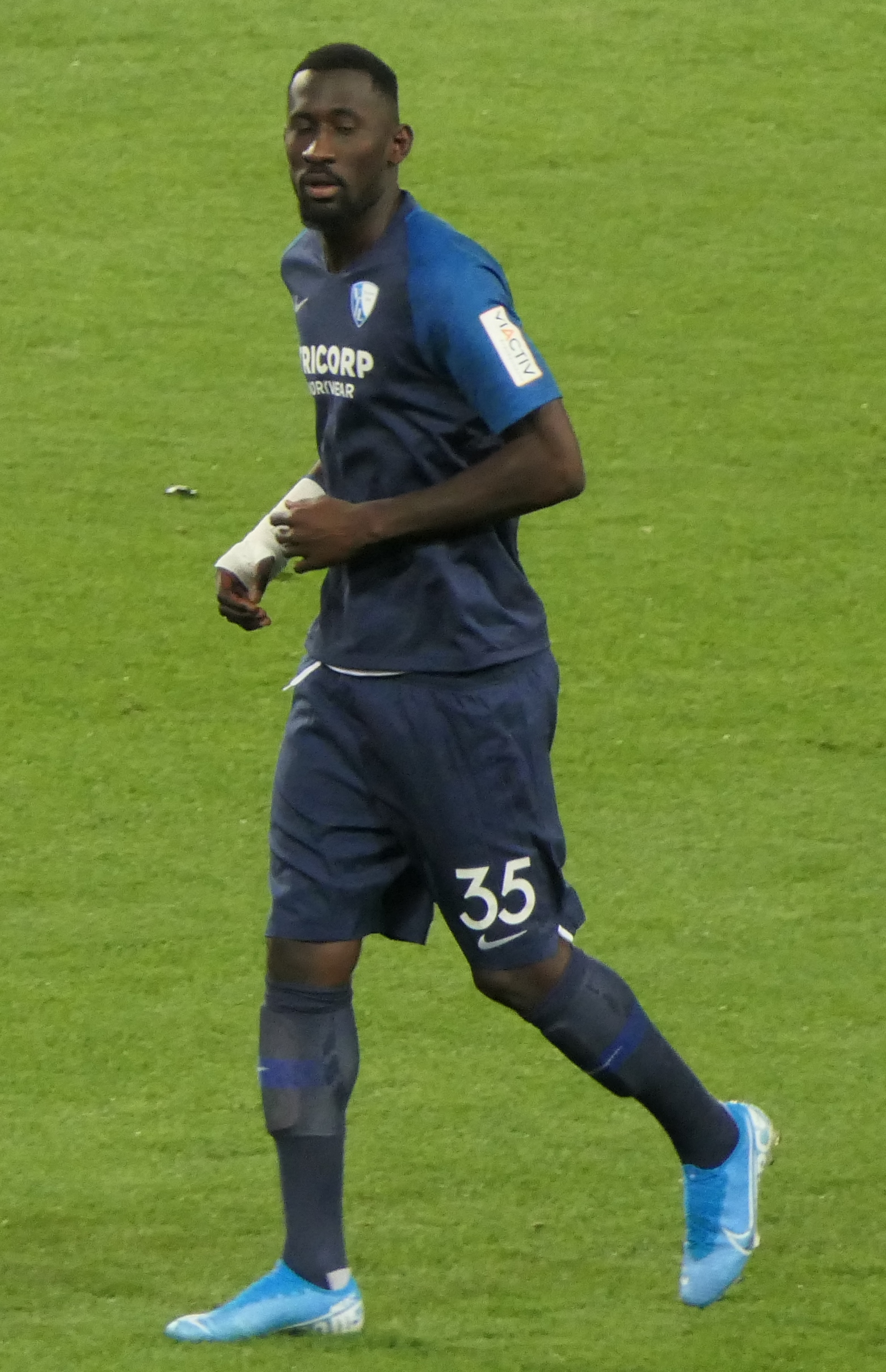
- Ganvoula with VfL Bochum in 2019

Personal information
- Full name: Silvère Ganvoula M'boussy
- Date of birth: 29 June 1996 (age 30)
- Place of birth: Brazzaville, Congo
- Height: 1.91 m (6 ft 3 in)
- Position: Forward

Youth career
- 2005–2009: Centre de Gothia
- 2009–2014: Patronage Sainte-Anne
- 2014–2015: Raja Casablanca

Senior career*
Years	Team	Apps	(Gls)
2013–2014	Patronage Sainte-Anne		
2014–2015	Raja Casablanca	4	(0)
2015–2016	Elazığspor	16	(5)
2016–2017	Westerlo	20	(7)
2017–2019	Anderlecht	9	(3)
2017	→ Westerlo (loan)	6	(2)
2017–2018	→ Mechelen (loan)	9	(0)
2018–2019	→ VfL Bochum (loan)	21	(5)
2019–2023	VfL Bochum	82	(15)
2022	→ Cercle Brugge (loan)	5	(0)
2023–2025	Young Boys	53	(14)
2025	Monza	7	(0)
2025–2026	Al-Fayha	32	(4)
2026	Wydad AC	2	(2)

International career^{‡}
2013–2014	Congo U17	12	(1)
2015–2016	Congo U20	3	(3)
2014–	Congo	25	(5)
Medal record
VfL Bochum
Winner	2. Bundesliga	2020–21
- * Club domestic league appearances and goals as of 20:55, 4 May 2026 (UTC) ‡ National team caps and goals as of 11 October 2024

Silvère Ganvoula M'boussy (born 29 June 1996) is a Congolese professional footballer who plays as a forward for the Congo national team.

== Club career ==
Ganvoula signed with Elazığspor on 5 July 2015.

He joined R.S.C. Anderlecht on a season long loan from Mechelen in 2017. and scored twice against his parent club in February 2018 He scored the winner for Anderlecht after coming on a substitute in a 2–1 win against Royal Antwerp in the Belgian First Division A on 11 March 2018.

=== VfL Bochum ===
In July 2018, Ganvoula joined 2. Bundesliga side VfL Bochum on loan for the 2018–19 season. Bochum secured an option to sign him permanently at the end of the season. In July 2019 Ganvoula was signed by Bochum. The following season, Ganvoula was Bochum's leading scorer with 13 goals in league play and 16 goals in all competitions – including a hat-trick against KSV Baunatal in the first round of the DFB-Pokal.

In January 2022, he signed for Belgian First Division A club Cercle Brugge on loan until the end of the season.

=== Monza ===
On 2 February 2025, Ganvoula signed a one-and-a-half-year contract with Monza in Italy.

=== Al-Fahya ===
On 25 August 2025, Ganvoula joined Saudi Pro League club Al-Fayha on a two-year contract.

=== Wydad AC ===
In September 2026, Ganvoula joined Botola Pro team Wydad AC. His debut match for the club came on 26 September where he was a second-half substitute, scoring a penalty in the 81st minute.

== International career ==
With the Congo U20 team, he took part in the 2015 U-20 Africa Cup of Nations held in Senegal. During the tournament, he scored one goal against Ivory Coast, one against Nigeria, and another against Senegal.

He received his first call-up to the Congo national team on 17 May 2014 for a match against Namibia in the qualifiers for the 2015 Africa Cup of Nations, a game his team lost 1–0. On 1 June 2014, he scored his first international goal, again against Namibia, in the same qualifying campaign, in a 3–0 victory.

== Personal life ==
In autumn 2017 Ganvoula had to cope with the loss of his father and only played 15 minutes between October and December for Anderlecht.

== Career statistics ==
=== Club ===
As of match played 19 April 2025

Appearances and goals by club, season and competition
Club	Season	League			Cup		Continental		Other		Total	
Club	Season	Division	Apps	Goals	Apps	Goals	Apps	Goals	Apps	Goals	Apps	Goals
Elazığspor	2015–16	TFF First League	16	5	2	0	—		—		18	5
Westerlo (loan)	2016–17	Belgian First Division A	26	9	0	0	—		—		26	9
Mechelen (loan)	2017–18	Belgian First Division A	9	0	1	0	—		—		10	0
Anderlecht	2017–18	Belgian First Division A	9	3	—		0	0	7	0	16	3
VfL Bochum (loan)	2018–19	2. Bundesliga	21	5	1	0	—		—		22	5
VfL Bochum	2019–20	2. Bundesliga	28	13	2	3	—		—		30	16
VfL Bochum	2020–21	2. Bundesliga	29	2	3	0	—		—		32	2
VfL Bochum	2021–22	Bundesliga	9	0	1	0	—		—		10	0
VfL Bochum	2022–23	Bundesliga	16	0	0	0	—		—		16	0
VfL Bochum	Total		82	15	6	3	0	0	0	0	88	18
Cercle Brugge (loan)	2021–22	Belgian First Division A	5	0	0	0	—		—		5	0
Young Boys	2023–24	Swiss Super League	35	9	4	2	10 (Note: Eight appearances in UEFA Champions League, two appearances and one goal in UEFA Europa League)	1	—		49	12
Young Boys	2024–25	Swiss Super League	18	5	1	0	10 (Note: Appearances in UEFA Champions League)	1	—		29	6
Young Boys	Total		53	14	4	2	20	2	—		78	18
Monza	2024–25	Serie A	7	0	0	0	—		—		7	0
Career total			228	50	15	5	20	2	7	0	270	58

=== International ===
As of match played 11 October 2024

Appearances and goals by national team and year
National team	Year	Apps	Goals
Congo	2014	4	1
Congo	2016	1	0
Congo	2017	1	0
Congo	2019	2	1
Congo	2020	3	0
Congo	2021	5	1
Congo	2022	2	0
Congo	2023	2	2
Congo	2024	5	0
Total		25	5

Scores and results list Congo's goal tally first, score column indicates score after each Ganvoula goal.

List of international goals scored by Silvère Ganvoula
No.	Date	Venue	Opponent	Score	Result	Competition
1	1 June 2014	Stade Municipal, Pointe-Noire, Congo	Namibia	1–0	3–0	2015 Africa Cup of Nations qualification
2	17 November 2019	Stade Alphonse Massemba-Débat, Brazzaville, Congo	Guinea-Bissau	2–0	3–0	2021 Africa Cup of Nations qualification
3	7 September 2021	Stade Alphonse Massemba-Débat, Brazzaville, Congo	Senegal	1–1	1–3	2022 FIFA World Cup qualification
4	10 September 2023	Marrakesh Stadium, Marrakesh, Morocco	Gambia	2–0	2–2	2023 Africa Cup of Nations qualification
5	17 November 2023	Levy Mwanawasa Stadium, Ndola, Zambia	Zambia	1–1	2–4	2026 FIFA World Cup qualification
