= Hilmar Weilandt =

German footballer (born 1966)

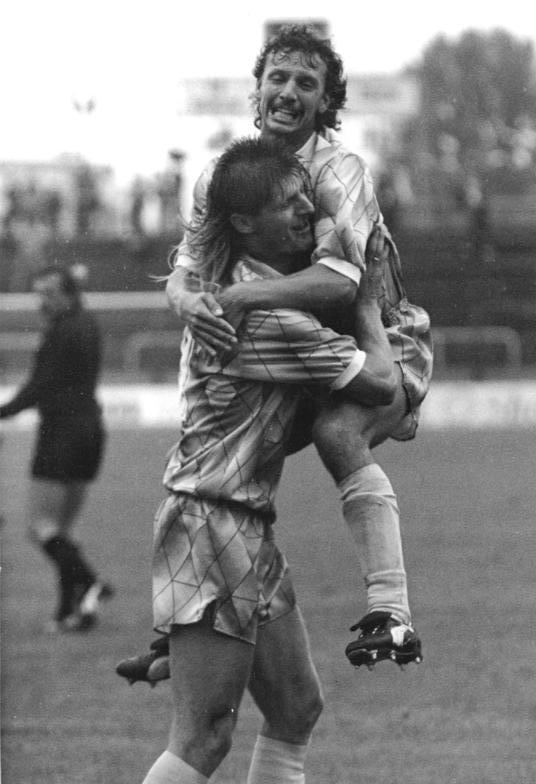
- Weilandt (top) with Volker Röhrich in 1990

Personal information
- Date of birth: 29 September 1966 (age 60)
- Place of birth: Stralsund, East Germany
- Height: 1.77 m (5 ft 10 in)
- Position: Defensive midfielder

Youth career
- –1979: BSG KKW Greifswald
- 1979–1980: KJS Rostock
- 1980–1986: Hansa Rostock

Senior career*
Years	Team	Apps	(Gls)
1986–2002	Hansa Rostock	365	(17)

International career
1990	East Germany	2	(0)
- * Club domestic league appearances and goals

Hilmar Weilandt (born 29 September 1966) is a former professional footballer who spent his entire career at Hansa Rostock. At international level, he made two appearances for the East Germany national team. He is the father of fellow footballer Tom Weilandt.

== Honours ==
Hansa Rostock

- DDR-Oberliga: 1991
- FDGB-Pokal: 1991; runner-up 1987
