= Danilo Soares =

Brazilian footballer (born 1991)

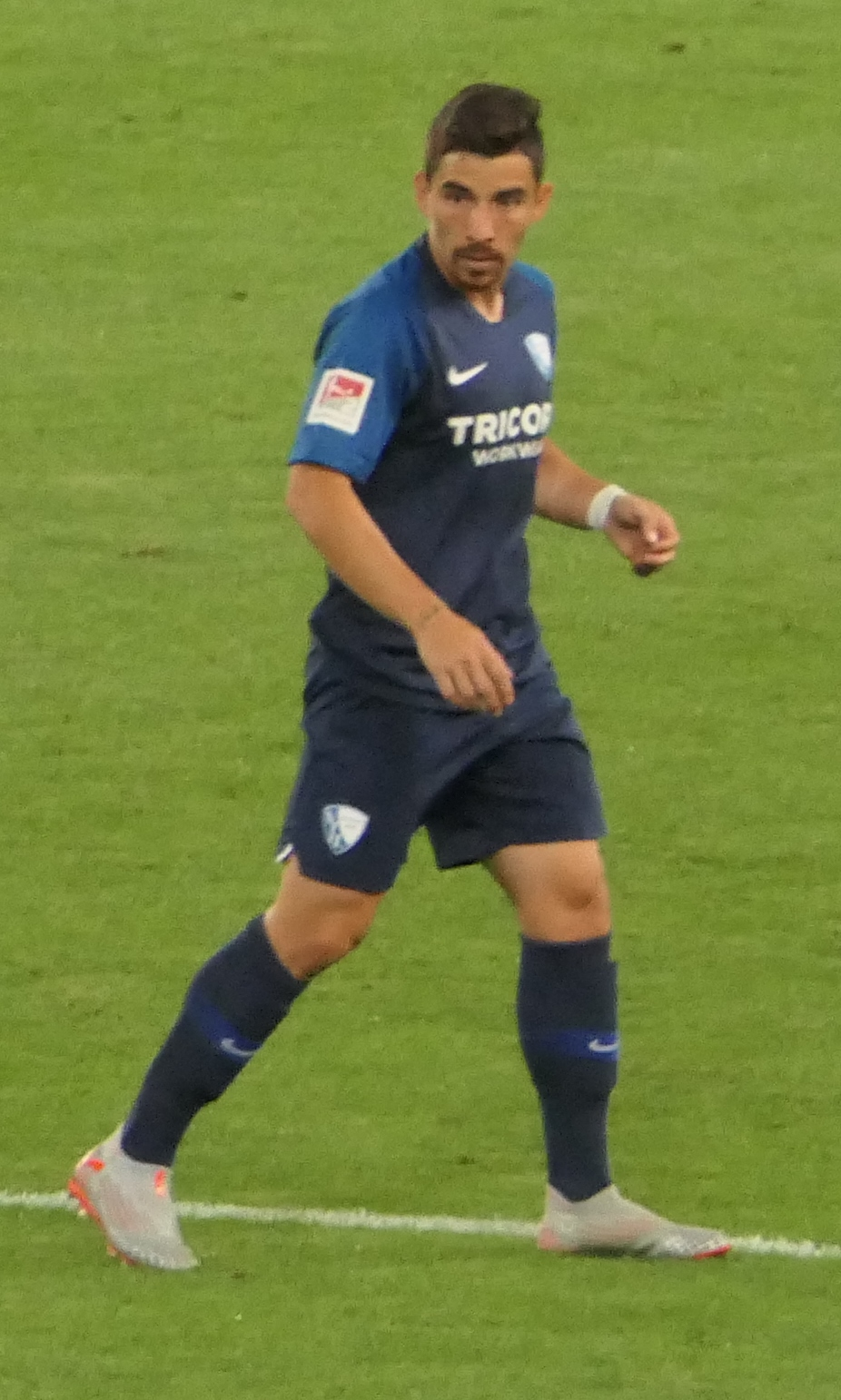
- Danilo Soares playing for VfL Bochum in 2019

Personal information
- Full name: Danilo Teodoro Soares
- Date of birth: 29 October 1991 (age 35)
- Place of birth: Belo Horizonte, Brazil
- Height: 1.70 m (5 ft 7 in)
- Position: Left back

Team information
- Current team: Austria Lustenau
- Number: 3

Senior career*
Years	Team	Apps	(Gls)
2010–2013	Austria Lustenau	82	(1)
2010	Austria Lustenau II	3	(2)
2013–2016	FC Ingolstadt	60	(1)
2016–2017	1899 Hoffenheim	0	(0)
2017–2024	VfL Bochum	175	(3)
2024–2026	1. FC Nürnberg	26	(1)
2026–	Austria Lustenau	0	(0)
- * Club domestic league appearances and goals as of 18 May 2026

Danilo Teodoro Soares (born 29 October 1991) is a Brazilian professional footballer who plays as a left back for Austrian Bundesliga club Austria Lustenau.

Born in Belo Horizonte, Brazil, Soares started his career in Austria with Austria Lustenau in 2010. He joined FC Ingolstadt of the 2. Bundesliga in summer 2013 and was promoted to the Bundesliga with the club in 2015, but injury issues limited him to just a single Bundesliga appearance and his left the club at the end of the season. He spent the 2016–17 season with TSG Hoffenheim but failed to make an appearance, with Soares joining VfL Bochum in summer 2017. He was promoted to the Bundesliga with Bochum at the end of the 2020–21 season.

== Career ==
=== Austria Lustenau ===
Born in Belo Horizonte, Soares went to schools in the Venda Nova neighbourhood of Belo Horizonte. His parents separated when he was a child and he experienced depression as a result. Having previously had an unsuccessful trial at Cruzeiro at around age 16, he spent a month on trial in the Netherlands, before signing a three-year contract with Austrian First League (second tier) club Austria Lustenau in 2010. He made 26 appearances during the 2010–11 season, 34 appearances in the 2011–12 season, and 31 appearances during the 2012–13 season, scoring once.

=== FC Ingolstadt ===
In summer 2013, Soares joined FC Ingolstadt, having signed a pre-contract agreement during the previous season. He made his debut for the club on 19 July 2013, starting in a 2–1 2. Bundesliga defeat at home to FC Erzgebirge Aue. He made 27 league appearances and two DFB-Pokal appearances across the 2013–14 season. On 2 March 2015, Soares scored his first goal for the club in a 1–1 draw with 1860 Munich. Despite suffering an injury in his left foot in early April, he appeared in 6 of 8 matches across April and May 2015, as Ingolstadt pushed for promotion. The 2014–15 season saw Ingolstadt promoted to the Bundesliga as champions of the 2. Bundesliga with 64 points. Soares started 32 of the club's 34 league matches that season, and scored once. Following the end of the season, he had surgery on his metatarsophalangeal joint, ruling him out for an extended period of time. Having returned from injury, Soares made his first Bundesliga appearance on 19 December 2015 in a 1–0 defeat to Bayer Leverkusen, and he committed to seeing out the season with Ingolstadt in January 2021. However, he did not make a further appearance during the 2015–16 season, and was released at the end of the season, with Soares continuing to suffer injury to his left toe, including the onset of osteoarthritis.

=== 1899 Hoffenheim ===
After a second operation on his toe in summer 2016, following which he rehabilitated at 1899 Hoffenheim, Soares joined Hoffenheimin November 2016 on a "performance-related contract" until summer 2017. He did not play during the 2016–17 season and he left the club at the end of his contract.

=== VfL Bochum ===
In summer 2017, Soares joined 2. Bundesliga club VfL Bochum on a three-year contract following the expiry of his contract at Hoffenheim. He made his debut for the club on 28 July 2017 in a 1–0 defeat to FC St. Pauli and went on to make 30 league appearances and two cup appearances during the 2017–18 season, whilst he made 23 league and one cup appearance during the 2018–19 season. He scored his first Bochum goal on 4 November 2019 in a 3–1 win over 1. FC Nürnberg, and made 32 league appearances and two cup appearances that season. With Danilo's contract with Bochum having expired on 30 June 2020, it was announced that he had signed a new four-year contract with the club on 4 July 2020. At the end of the 2020–21 season, Bochum were promoted to the Bundesliga after finishing top of the 2. Bundesliga, with Soares having made 32 league appearances, scoring twice and providing three assists.

=== 1. FC Nürnberg ===
Soares left Bochum as a free agent, his contract having expired. On 29 May 2024, Soares joined 2. Bundesliga team 1. FC Nürnberg on a one-year contract with an option to extend a further year. Soares was brought into the club with the goal of adding experience in the defensive region.

=== Return to Austria Lustenau ===
In the summer of 2026, Soares returned to Austria Lustenau with a two-season contract.

== Career statistics ==
As of match played 19 February 2022

Appearances and goals by club, season and competition
Club	Season	League			Cup (Note: Includes Austrian Cup, DFB-Pokal)		Total	
Club	Season	Division	Apps	Goals	Apps	Goals	Apps	Goals
SC Austria Lustenau II	2010–11	Landesliga Vorarlberg	3	2	—		3	2
SC Austria Lustenau	2010–11	First League	22	0	4	0	26	0
SC Austria Lustenau	2011–12	First League	30	0	4	0	34	0
SC Austria Lustenau	2012–13	First League	30	1	1	0	31	1
SC Austria Lustenau	Total		82	1	9	0	91	1
FC Ingolstadt	2013–14	2. Bundesliga	27	0	2	0	29	0
FC Ingolstadt	2014–15	2. Bundesliga	32	1	1	0	33	1
FC Ingolstadt	2015–16	Bundesliga	1	0	0	0	1	0
FC Ingolstadt	Total		60	1	3	0	63	1
TSG Hoffenheim	2016–17	Bundesliga	0	0	0	0	0	0
VfL Bochum	2017–18	2. Bundesliga	30	0	2	0	32	0
VfL Bochum	2018–19	2. Bundesliga	23	0	1	0	24	0
VfL Bochum	2019–20	2. Bundesliga	32	1	2	0	34	1
VfL Bochum	2020–21	2. Bundesliga	32	2	3	0	35	2
VfL Bochum	2021–22	Bundesliga	22	0	3	0	25	0
VfL Bochum	Total		139	3	11	0	150	3
Career total			184	7	23	0	307	7
