= Armel Bella-Kotchap =

German footballer (born 2001)

Personal information
- Full name: Armel Bella-Kotchap
- Date of birth: 11 December 2001 (age 24)
- Place of birth: Paris, France
- Height: 1.90 m (6 ft 3 in)
- Position: Centre-back

Team information
- Current team: Venezia

Youth career
- 2005–2009: Rot Weiss Ahlen
- 2009–2012: SC Grimlinghausen
- 2012–2015: Borussia Mönchengladbach
- 2015–2016: SG Unterrath
- 2016–2017: MSV Duisburg
- 2017–2020: VfL Bochum

Senior career*
Years	Team	Apps	(Gls)
2018–2022	VfL Bochum	66	(1)
2022–2026	Southampton	28	(0)
2023–2024	→ PSV (loan)	4	(0)
2024	→ Jong PSV (loan)	3	(0)
2025–2026	→ Hellas Verona (loan)	14	(0)
2026	Hellas Verona	5	(0)
2026–	Venezia	3	(0)

International career^{‡}
2018–2019	Germany U18	5	(0)
2020	Germany U20	1	(0)
2021–2022	Germany U21	9	(0)
2022	Germany	2	(0)
- * Club domestic league appearances and goals as of 05:07, 24 September 2026 (UTC) ‡ National team caps and goals as of 18:55, 16 November 2022 (UTC)

Armel Bella-Kotchap (born 11 December 2001) is a professional footballer who plays as a centre-back for Serie A club Venezia. Born in France, he played for the Germany national team.

== Club career ==
=== VfL Bochum ===
In July 2018, Bella-Kotchap joined VfL Bochum professional team 2018–19 summer training camp. In March 2019, Bella-Kotchap signed his first professional contract with VfL Bochum. He made his professional debut for Bochum in the 2. Bundesliga on 28 April 2019, starting in the away match against Erzgebirge Aue.

=== Southampton ===
On 21 June 2022, Bella-Kotchap joined Southampton on a four-year deal, for a fee estimated at 10 million euros. Having established himself as a regular starter at centre-back, Bella-Kotchap dislocated his shoulder in a collision during the 1–1 draw with West Ham United on 16 October. As a result, he was expected to be out of action for several weeks. He returned from injury on 6 November in a 4–1 home defeat against Newcastle United. On 4 January 2023, Bella-Kotchap tweaked his knee during the first half of a 1–0 home defeat against Nottingham Forest and was expected to be injured for a matter of weeks. Bella-Kotchap dislocated his shoulder again during a 3–3 draw with Tottenham Hotspur on 18 March 2023.

==== PSV (loan) ====
On 1 September 2023, Bella-Kotchap joined Eredivisie side PSV on a season-long loan. He made his professional debut for the club on 16 September 2023 in a 4–0 victory against NEC. Four days later, Bella-Kotchap made his first Champions League appearance in a 4–0 defeat to Arsenal. In October 2023, he suffered a shoulder injury and was expected to be sidelined until the end of year.

=== Hellas Verona ===
On 27 August 2025, Bella-Kotchap joined Serie A side Hellas Verona on a season-long loan. He made his debut for the club on 31 August in a 4–0 defeat against Lazio after he replaced Fallou Cham in the 46th minute. On 2 February 2026, Bella-Kotchap joined the club permanently for an undisclosed fee.

=== Venezia ===
On 29 June 2026, Bella-Kotchap joined Serie A side Venezia on a four-year contract.

== International career ==
Bella-Kotchap began his youth international career with the Germany under-18 team, making his debut on 15 November 2018 in a friendly match against Cyprus, which finished as a 1–0 win.

On 15 September 2022, Bella-Kotchap was included in the German senior squad for the first time. He made his debut as a late substitute on 26 September in a 3–3 draw with England. In November 2022, he was selected in the German squad for the 2022 FIFA World Cup in Qatar.

== Personal life ==
Bella-Kotchap was born in Paris, France, and is the son of former Cameroon international Cyrille Florent Bella.

== Career statistics ==
=== Club ===
As of match played 6 September 2026

Appearances and goals by club, season and competition
Club	Season	League			National cup (Note: Includes DFB-Pokal, FA Cup, Coppa Italia)		League cup		Europe		Total	
Club	Season	Division	Apps	Goals	Apps	Goals	Apps	Goals	Apps	Goals	Apps	Goals
VfL Bochum	2018–19	2. Bundesliga	4	0	0	0	–		—		4	0
VfL Bochum	2019–20	2. Bundesliga	12	0	2	0	–		—		14	0
VfL Bochum	2020–21	2. Bundesliga	28	1	2	0	–		—		30	1
VfL Bochum	2021–22	Bundesliga	22	0	4	0	–		—		26	0
VfL Bochum	Total		66	1	8	0	–		—		74	1
Southampton	2022–23	Premier League	24	0	1	0	1	0	—		26	0
Southampton	2023–24	Championship	0	0	0	0	0	0	—		0	0
Southampton	2024–25	Premier League	4	0	0	0	1	0	—		5	0
Southampton	2025–26	Championship	0	0	0	0	0	0	—		0	0
Southampton	Total		28	0	1	0	2	0	—		31	0
PSV (loan)	2023–24	Eredivisie	4	0	0	0	—		2 (Note: Appearances in UEFA Champions League)	0	6	0
Jong PSV (loan)	2023–24	Eerste Divisie	3	0	—		—		—		3	0
Hellas Verona	2025–26	Serie A	19	0	1	0	—		—		20	0
Venezia	2026–27	Serie A	3	0	2	0	—		—		5	0
Career total			123	1	12	0	2	0	2	0	139	1

=== International ===
As of match played 16 November 2022

Appearances and goals by national team and year
National team	Year	Apps	Goals
Germany
Germany	2022	2	0
Total		2	0

== Honours ==
VfL Bochum

- 2. Bundesliga: 2020–21

PSV

- Eredivisie: 2023–24
