= Maxim Leitsch =

German footballer

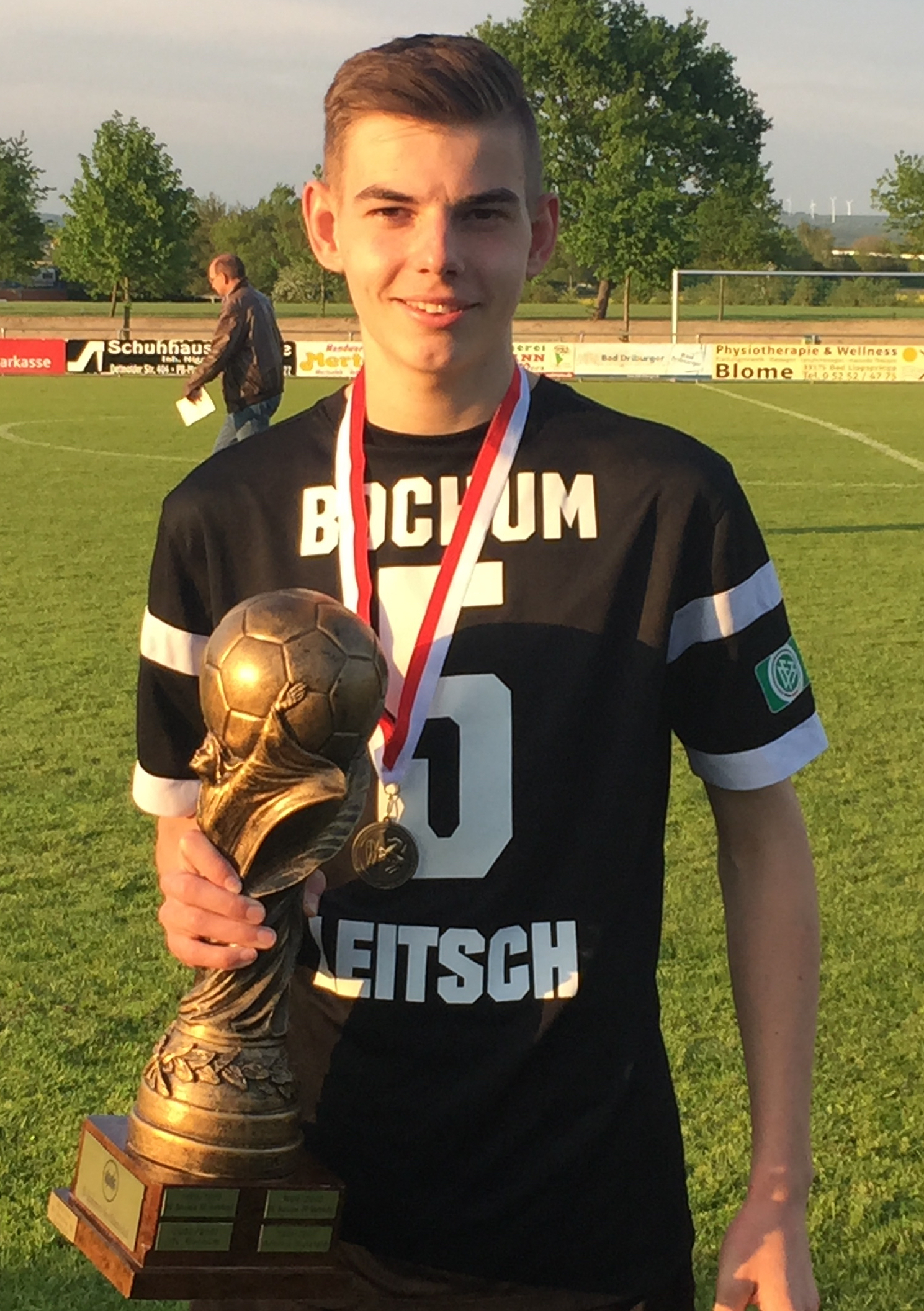
- Leitsch in 2015

Personal information
- Date of birth: 18 May 1998 (age 28)
- Place of birth: Essen, Germany
- Height: 1.88 m (6 ft 2 in)
- Position: Centre-back

Youth career
- –2007: Essener SG 99/06
- 2007–2008: SG Wattenscheid 09
- 2008–2017: VfL Bochum

Senior career*
Years	Team	Apps	(Gls)
2016–2022	VfL Bochum	87	(2)
2022–2026	Mainz 05	33	(1)
2023–2025	Mainz 05 II	3	(0)

International career
2015	Germany U18	2	(0)
2016	Germany U19	2	(0)
2020–2021	Germany U21	3	(0)
- * Club domestic league appearances and goals as of 16 May 2026

Maxim Leitsch (born 18 May 1998) is a German professional footballer who plays as a centre-back

== Club career ==
On 20 May 2022, Leitsch signed a contract with Mainz 05.

== Career statistics ==
As of 5 December 2025

Appearances and goals by club, season and competition
Club	Season	League			National Cup		Europe		Total	
Club	Season	Division	Apps	Goals	Apps	Goals	Apps	Goals	Apps	Goals
VfL Bochum	2016–17	2. Bundesliga	2	0	0	0	—		2	0
VfL Bochum	2017–18	2. Bundesliga	10	0	1	0	—		11	0
VfL Bochum	2018–19	2. Bundesliga	8	0	1	0	—		9	0
VfL Bochum	2019–20	2. Bundesliga	15	1	0	0	—		15	1
VfL Bochum	2020–21	2. Bundesliga	33	0	2	0	—		35	0
VfL Bochum	2021–22	Bundesliga	19	1	3	0	—		22	1
VfL Bochum	Total		87	2	7	0	—		94	2
Mainz 05	2022–23	Bundesliga	9	0	1	0	—		10	0
Mainz 05	2023–24	Bundesliga	7	0	1	0	—		8	0
Mainz 05	2024–25	Bundesliga	14	1	2	0	—		16	1
Mainz 05	2025–26	Bundesliga	3	0	1	0	1 (Note: Appearances in UEFA Conference League)	0	5	0
Mainz 05	Total		33	1	5	0	1	0	39	1
Career total			120	3	12	0	1	0	133	3
