= Jordi Osei-Tutu =

English footballer (born 1998)

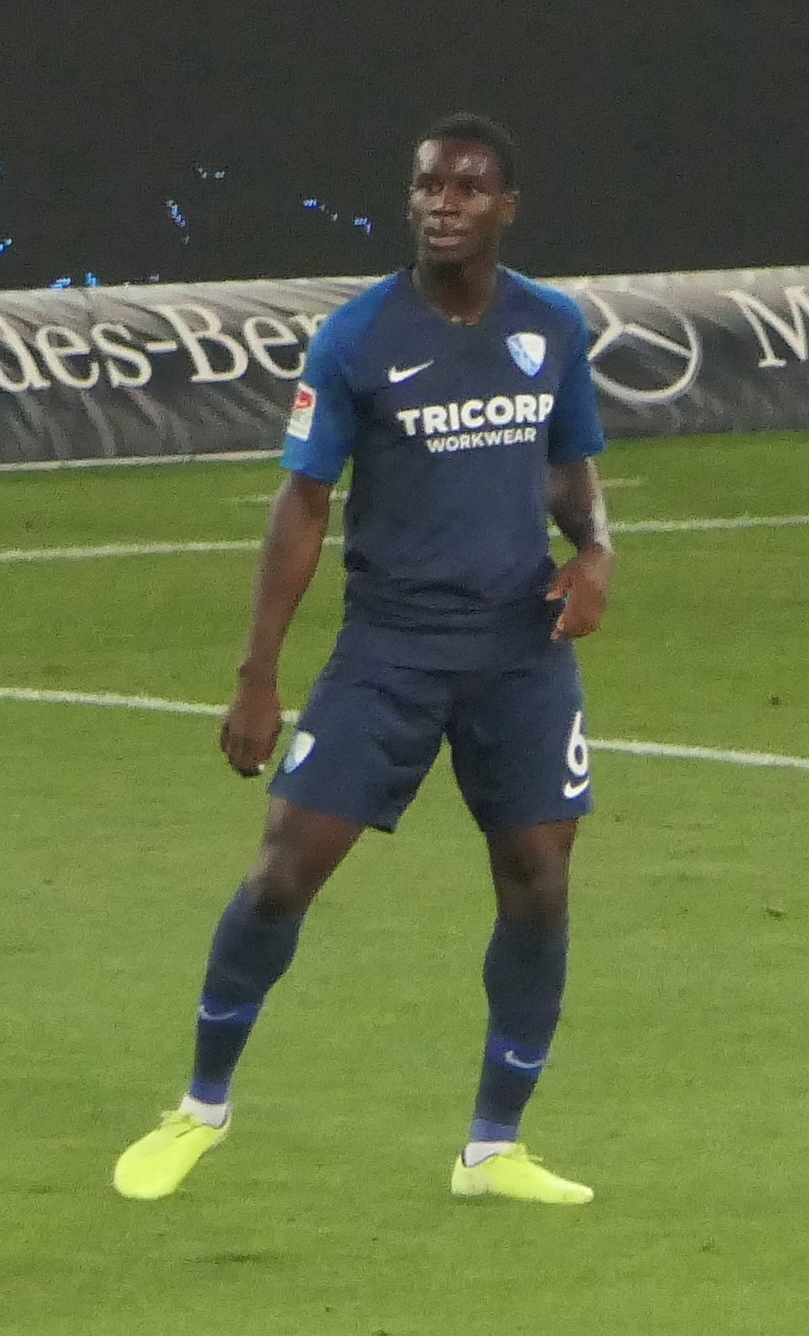
- Osei-Tutu playing for VfL Bochum

Personal information
- Full name: Jordi Martin Emmanuel Osei-Tutu
- Date of birth: 2 October 1998 (age 28)
- Place of birth: Slough, England
- Height: 5 ft 9 in (1.76 m)
- Positions: Right-back; winger

Team information
- Current team: Millwall
- Number: 2

Youth career
- –2015: Reading
- 2015–2019: Arsenal

Senior career*
Years	Team	Apps	(Gls)
2017–2022	Arsenal	0	(0)
2019–2020	→ VfL Bochum (loan)	21	(5)
2020–2021	→ Cardiff City (loan)	8	(0)
2021–2022	→ Nottingham Forest (loan)	4	(0)
2022	→ Rotherham United (loan)	14	(0)
2022–2024	VfL Bochum	20	(0)
2024	→ PAS Giannina (loan)	8	(0)
2024–2026	Bolton Wanderers	68	(3)
2026–	Millwall	1	(0)
- * Club domestic league appearances and goals as of 31 August 2026 (UTC)

Jordi Martin Emmanuel Osei-Tutu (born 2 October 1998) is an English professional footballer who plays as a right-back or winger for EFL Championship club Millwall.

== Career ==
=== Arsenal ===
In July 2015, Osei-Tutu joined the youth academy of Arsenal from Reading. He signed his first professional contract in October 2015.

==== Loan to VfL Bochum ====
In June 2019, it was announced that he would join German second-division club VfL Bochum on loan for the 2019–20 season. On 9 July 2019, in his second appearance for Bochum, Osei-Tutu was racially abused in a friendly against Swiss club St. Gallen, causing him to temporarily leave the field of play. Osei-Tutu made his professional debut for Bochum in the 2. Bundesliga on 28 July 2019, starting in the 3–1 away defeat against Jahn Regensburg. He scored his first goal in his professional career in a 3–1 win over SV Wehen Wiesbaden on 24 August.

Over the course of the loan spell, Osei-Tutu made 21 appearances, scored five goals and provided three assists.

==== Loan to Cardiff City ====
On 25 August 2020, Osei-Tutu joined Championship side Cardiff City on a season-long loan deal. He made his debut in a 3–0 loss against Northampton Town in the first round of the Carabao Cup on 5 September 2020. After seven appearances, he had suffered a serious hamstring injury in mid-October and kept him out of the team since then.

==== Loan to Nottingham Forest ====
On 10 August 2021, Osei-Tutu moved to Championship club Nottingham Forest on a season-long loan. On 6 January 2022, his loan was terminated after struggling with injuries during his spell at the club.

==== Loan to Rotherham United ====
On 31 January 2022, Osei-Tutu moved to EFL League One club Rotherham United on loan until the end of the season.

=== Return to VfL Bochum ===
On 23 June 2022, VfL Bochum announced the return of Osei-Tutu on a free transfer, with Osei-Tutu signing a three-year deal.

==== Loan to PAS Giannina ====
On 22 January 2024, Osei-Tutu moved on loan to PAS Giannina in Greece.

=== Bolton Wanderers ===
On 8 August 2024, Osei-Tutu signed for League One club Bolton Wanderers for an undisclosed fee on an initial two-year deal. On 26 May 2026, the club confirmed that Osei-Tutu would leave at the end of his contract.

=== Millwall ===
Osei-Tutu joined Championship club Millwall on a one-year contract on 21 August 2026.

== Personal life ==
Osei-Tutu was born in Slough, Berkshire and is of Ghanaian descent. He is also younger cousin of Brentford FC legend Lloyd Owusu.

== Career statistics ==
As of 30 April 2022

Appearances and goals by club, season and competition
Club	Season	League			National Cup		League Cup		Other		Total	
Club	Season	Division	Apps	Goals	Apps	Goals	Apps	Goals	Apps	Goals	Apps	Goals
Arsenal	2017–18	Premier League	0	0	0	0	0	0	0	0	0	0
Arsenal	2018–19	Premier League	0	0	0	0	0	0	—		0	0
Arsenal	Total		0	0	0	0	0	0	0	0	0	0
Arsenal U21s	2018–19	—			—		—		1 (Note: Appearance in EFL Trophy)	0	1	0
VfL Bochum (loan)	2019–20	2. Bundesliga	21	5	1	0	—		—		22	5
Cardiff City (loan)	2020–21	Championship	8	0	0	0	1	0	—		9	0
Nottingham Forest (loan)	2021–22	Championship	4	0	0	0	0	0	—		4	0
Rotherham United (loan)	2021–22	League One	14	0	—		—		2	1	16	1
VfL Bochum	2022–23	Bundesliga	20	0	2	0	—		—		22	0
VfL Bochum	Total		20	0	2	0	0	0	0	0	22	0
Career total			67	5	3	0	1	0	3	1	74	6

== Honours ==
Rotherham United

- EFL League One second-place promotion: 2021–22
- EFL Trophy: 2021–22

Bolton Wanderers

- EFL League One play-offs: 2026
