= Barış Ekincier =

German-born Azerbaijani footballer (born 1999)

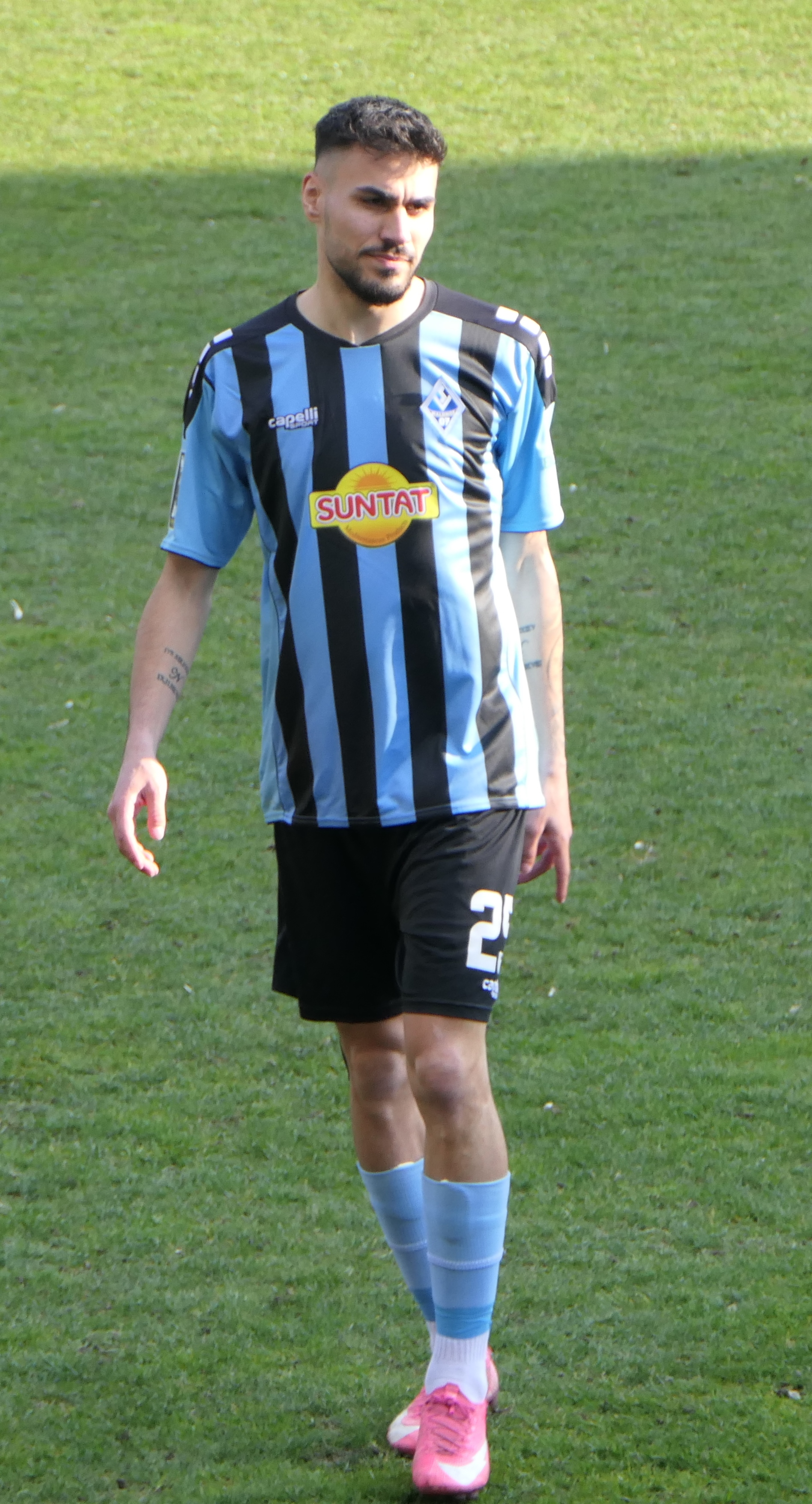

Personal information
- Date of birth: 24 March 1999 (age 27)
- Place of birth: Hemer, Germany
- Height: 1.81 m (5 ft 11 in)
- Position: Midfielder

Team information
- Current team: Elazığspor
- Number: 7

Youth career
- –2015: FC Iserlohn
- 2015–2017: Rot-Weiss Essen
- 2017–2018: VfL Bochum

Senior career*
Years	Team	Apps	(Gls)
2019–2021	VfL Bochum	1	(0)
2019–2020	→ Austria Klagenfurt (loan)	8	(0)
2021–2023	Waldhof Mannheim	35	(4)
2023–2024	Şanlıurfaspor	29	(4)
2024–2026	Ümraniyespor	65	(8)
2026–	Elazığspor	4	(1)

International career^{‡}
2016	Azerbaijan U17	2	(0)
2017	Azerbaijan U19	3	(0)
2018–2020	Azerbaijan U21	12	(4)
- * Club domestic league appearances and goals as of 1 October 2026 ‡ National team caps and goals as of 13 October 2020

Barış Ekincier (Azerbaijani: Barış Əkinçiər; born 24 March 1999) is a professional footballer who plays as a midfielder for Turkish club Elazığspor. Born in Germany, he has represented Azerbaijan at youth international levels up to the under-21s.

== Club career ==
Ekincier began his football career with the youth teams of FC Iserlohn and Rot-Weiss Essen, before joining the VfL Bochum youth academy in 2017. In August 2017, he played for the first team in a friendly match against Bayer Leverkusen.

In June 2018, Ekincier signed his first professional contract with VfL Bochum, lasting two years until 30 June 2020. On 19 August 2018, he appeared for Bochum in the first round of the 2018–19 DFB-Pokal, coming on as a substitute in the 62nd minute for Tom Weilandt in the 1–0 away loss against Regionalliga Nord side Weiche Flensburg. Ekincier made his 2. Bundesliga debut for Bochum on 5 April 2019, coming on as a substitute in the 74th minute for Miloš Pantović in the 2–1 away loss against Jahn Regensburg.

On 18 July 2019, it was announced that Ekincier had joined SK Austria Klagenfurt on a season-long loan deal.

== International career ==
Ekincier was included in hosts Azerbaijan's squad for the 2016 UEFA European Under-17 Championship in May 2016. He appeared in Azerbaijan's first two matches, with the team being eliminated in the group stage of the tournament.

== Personal life ==
Ekincier was born in the German city of Hemer, North Rhine-Westphalia and is of Turkish descent.
