= Miloš Pantović =

Serbian footballer

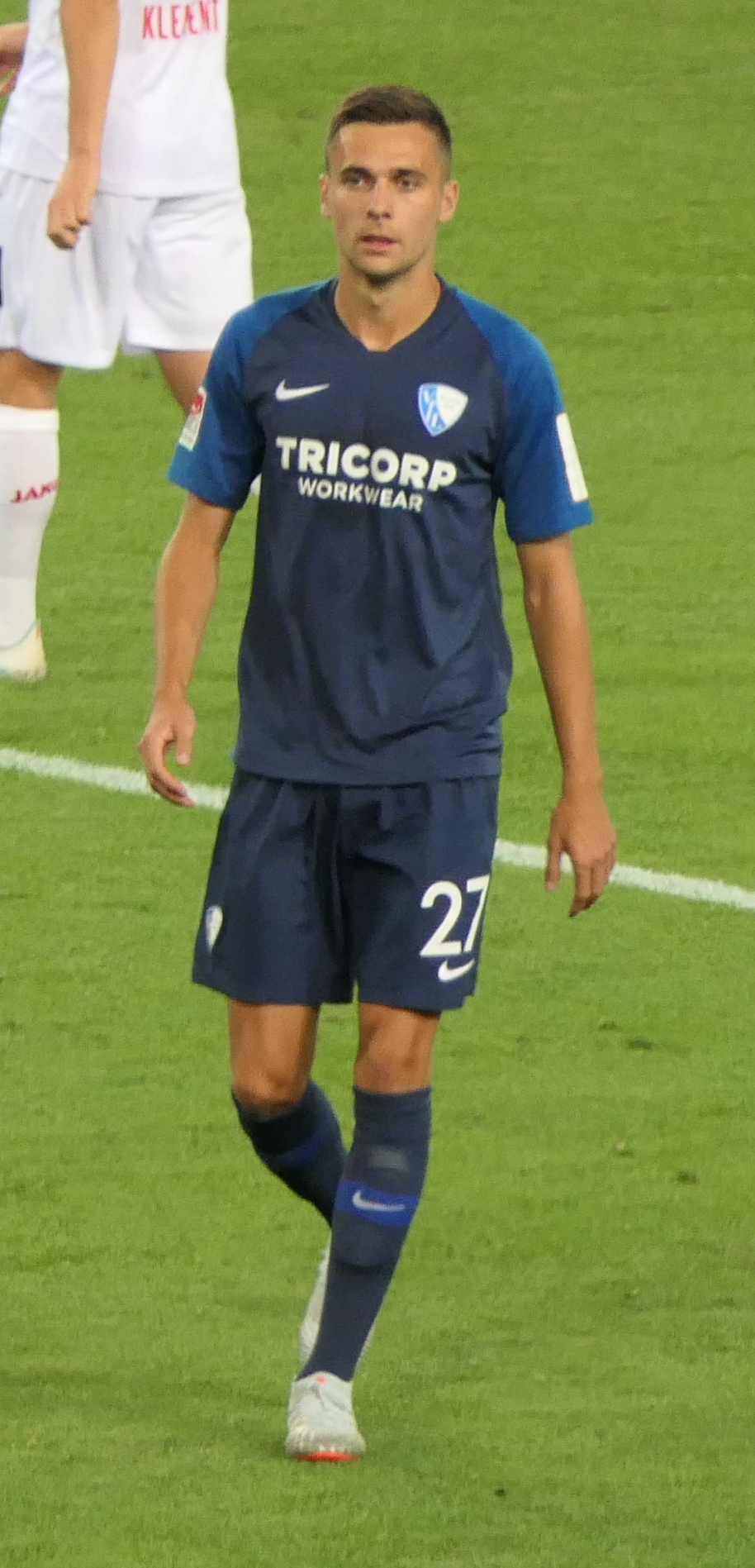
- Pantović with VfL Bochum in 2019

Personal information
- Date of birth: 7 July 1996 (age 30)
- Place of birth: Munich, Germany
- Height: 1.86 m (6 ft 1 in)
- Positions: Attacking midfielder; winger

Team information
- Current team: OFK Beograd
- Number: 27

Youth career
- Helios Daglfing
- –2007: Rot-Weiss Oberföhring
- 2007–2015: Bayern Munich

Senior career*
Years	Team	Apps	(Gls)
2014–2018	Bayern Munich II	94	(34)
2015–2018	Bayern Munich	1	(0)
2018–2022	VfL Bochum	91	(8)
2022–2023	Union Berlin	14	(2)
2023–2025	Eupen	38	(3)
2025–	OFK Beograd	18	(0)

International career^{‡}
2015	Serbia U19	0	(0)
2016–2017	Serbia U20	3	(1)
2015–2017	Serbia U21	7	(1)
- * Club domestic league appearances and goals as of 12 June 2026 ‡ National team caps and goals as of 7 November 2021

Miloš Pantović (Serbian Cyrillic: Милош Пантовић; born 7 July 1996) is a professional footballer who plays as an attacking midfielder for Serbian club OFK Beograd. Born in Germany, he has represented Serbia at youth levels internationally.

== Early life ==
Pantović was born in Munich, after his parents moved there from Arilje, Serbia.

== Club career ==
=== Early career ===
Pantović started playing football at the age of six, at first plying his trade with local club Helios Daglfing. He then joined Rot-Weiss Oberföhring and later, in 2007, he joined Bayern Munich U12 team, and then played for every single one of Bayern's youth teams. He started playing for Bayern Munich II in 2014, and was almost instantaneously rewarded with a selection to Serbia U19 national team. He would go on to make six appearances. Pantović made his Bundesliga debut in the 9th fixture of 2015–16 season, replacing Arturo Vidal in 92 minute, and thus became the first Serbian player since Radmilo Mihajlović, 1989-1990, to represent FC Bayern. This would be his only appearance for the first team. He scored seven goals in 28 appearances for the first team 2015–16 season for the reserve team. He scored 15 goals in 27 appearances in the 2016–17 season. He scored 12 goals in 33 appearances in the 2017–18 season.

=== VfL Bochum ===
On 14 May 2018, it was announced that he was moving to VfL Bochum in the 2. Bundesliga on a free transfer.

=== Union Berlin ===
On 13 June 2022, Union Berlin announced the signing of Pantovic.

=== Eupen ===
On 28 August 2023, Pantović signed a two-year contract with Eupen in Belgium.

== International career ==
Pantović was called in U19 national team selection in spring 2015, but he played only friendly matches. After he made his debut for the first team of Bayern Munich, Pantović received a call from Tomislav Sivić, coach of U21 selection.

== Career statistics ==
As of 6 August 2024

Appearances and goals by club, season and competition
Club	Season	League			Cup (Note: Includes DFB-Pokal, Belgian Cup.)		Total	
Club	Season	League	Apps	Goals	Apps	Goals	Apps	Goals
Bayern Munich II	2014–15	Regionalliga Bayern	6	0	—		6	0
Bayern Munich II	2015–16	Regionalliga Bayern	28	7	—		28	7
Bayern Munich II	2016–17	Regionalliga Bayern	27	15	—		27	15
Bayern Munich II	2017–18	Regionalliga Bayern	33	12	—		33	12
Bayern Munich II	Total		94	34	—		95	34
Bayern Munich	2015–16	Bundesliga	1	0	0	0	1	0
VfL Bochum	2018–19	2. Bundesliga	15	1	1	0	16	1
VfL Bochum	2019–20	2. Bundesliga	20	0	1	0	21	0
VfL Bochum	2020–21	2. Bundesliga	28	3	3	1	31	4
VfL Bochum	2021–22	Bundesliga	28	4	4	4	32	8
VfL Bochum	Total		91	8	9	5	99	13
Union Berlin	2022–23	Bundesliga	13	1	1	0	14	1
Union Berlin	2023–24	Bundesliga	1	1	0	0	1	1
Union Berlin	Total		14	2	1	0	15	2
Eupen	2022–23	Belgian Pro League	19	2	1	0	20	2
Career total			219	46	11	5	230	51

== Honours ==
Bayern Munich

- Bundesliga: 2015-16
- DFL-Supercup: 2017

VfL Bochum

- 2. Bundesliga: 2020-21
