= Danny Blum =

German footballer (born 1991)

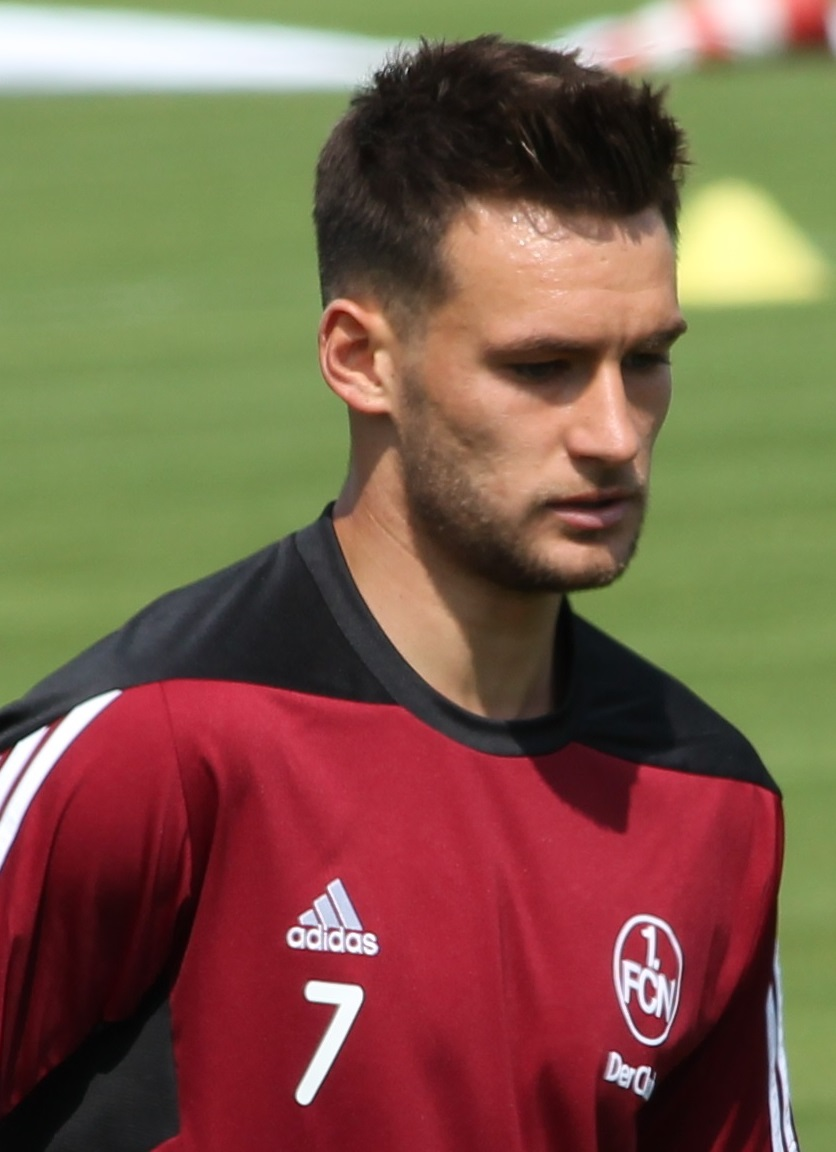
- Blum with 1. FC Nürnberg in 2014

Personal information
- Date of birth: 7 January 1991 (age 35)
- Place of birth: Frankenthal, Germany
- Height: 1.83 m (6 ft 0 in)
- Position: Winger

Team information
- Current team: TSG Pfeddersheim
- Number: 7

Youth career
- SC Rot-Weiß Frankenthal
- 2004: Waldhof Mannheim
- 2004–2007: 1. FC Kaiserslautern
- 2007–2009: Schalke 04
- 2009–2010: Waldhof Mannheim

Senior career*
Years	Team	Apps	(Gls)
2010–2014	SV Sandhausen	83	(7)
2012–2013	→ Karlsruher SC (loan)	18	(1)
2014–2016	1. FC Nürnberg	41	(7)
2016–2019	Eintracht Frankfurt	16	(2)
2018–2019	→ Las Palmas (loan)	23	(1)
2019–2022	VfL Bochum	60	(15)
2022	APOEL	14	(2)
2023	1. FC Nürnberg	2	(0)
2024	Intercity	7	(1)
2024–	TSG Pfeddersheim	6	(2)

International career
2011	Germany U20	3	(0)
- * Club domestic league appearances and goals as of 29 August 2024

Danny Blum (born 7 January 1991) is a German professional footballer who plays as a winger for sixth-tier Verbandsliga Südwest club TSG Pfeddersheim. He plays mainly as a winger but also can play as a forward.

He began his professional career with SV Sandhausen of the 3. Liga, winning the title in 2012 and again on loan to Karlsruher SC a year later. After one 2. Bundesliga season with Sandhausen, he joined 1. FC Nürnberg in 2014 on a free transfer, and almost immediately suffered a six-month knee injury. After losing the play-off for promotion to the Bundesliga against Eintracht Frankfurt in 2016, he joined that team, where he was a DFB-Pokal runner-up in 2017 and winner a year later.

== Career ==
=== SV Sandhausen ===
Born in Frankenthal, Rhineland-Palatinate, Blum was on the books of FC Schalke 04 as a youth and was given his first professional contract at SV Waldhof Mannheim before joining SV Sandhausen months later.

He made his professional debut for Sandhausen on 23 March 2010 in the 3. Liga, as a 59th-minute substitute for Daniel Jungwirth in a 3–0 loss away to VfB Stuttgart II, totalling eight games (three starts) in his first season. The following season he was a regular, playing 30 of 38 games, starting all but four.

In 2011–12, Blum's time was split between the field and the bench as Sandhausen were promoted as champions. He scored three goals for them, the first on 19 November in a 2–0 home win over SC Preußen Münster, eight minutes after coming on for Roberto Pinto.

On 5 June 2012, Blum was loaned back into the third tier, joining relegated Karlsruher SC for the season. He was again a league champion despite playing rarely, and scored his one goal on 15 December in a 3–1 home win against VfB Stuttgart II as a late substitute.

In 2013–14, Blum competed with Sandhausen in the 2. Bundesliga, with the team having stayed up due to MSV Duisburg's administrative relegation. He played 19 games in the second tier and scored four goals, the first to open a 2–0 home win over FSV Frankfurt on 3 November.

=== 1. FC Nürnberg ===
On 23 May 2014, Blum joined fellow 2. Bundesliga team 1. FC Nürnberg on a free transfer. In pre-season, he suffered knee cartilage damage that ruled him out for six months, and was given a 50% chance by his doctor of playing professionally again.

He finally made his FCN debut on 15 February 2016, replacing Peniel Mlapa for the final 12 minutes of a 2–0 win over 1. FC Union Berlin at home. A week later, again from the bench, he scored his first goal to give the lead in a 3–1 win at Fortuna Düsseldorf, eventually totalling three in 12 games (four starts).

In 2015–16, Nürnberg came third and played a play-off against Eintracht Frankfurt for promotion to the Bundesliga, with Blum a late substitute in both legs of the 2–1 aggregate defeat.

=== Eintracht Frankfurt ===
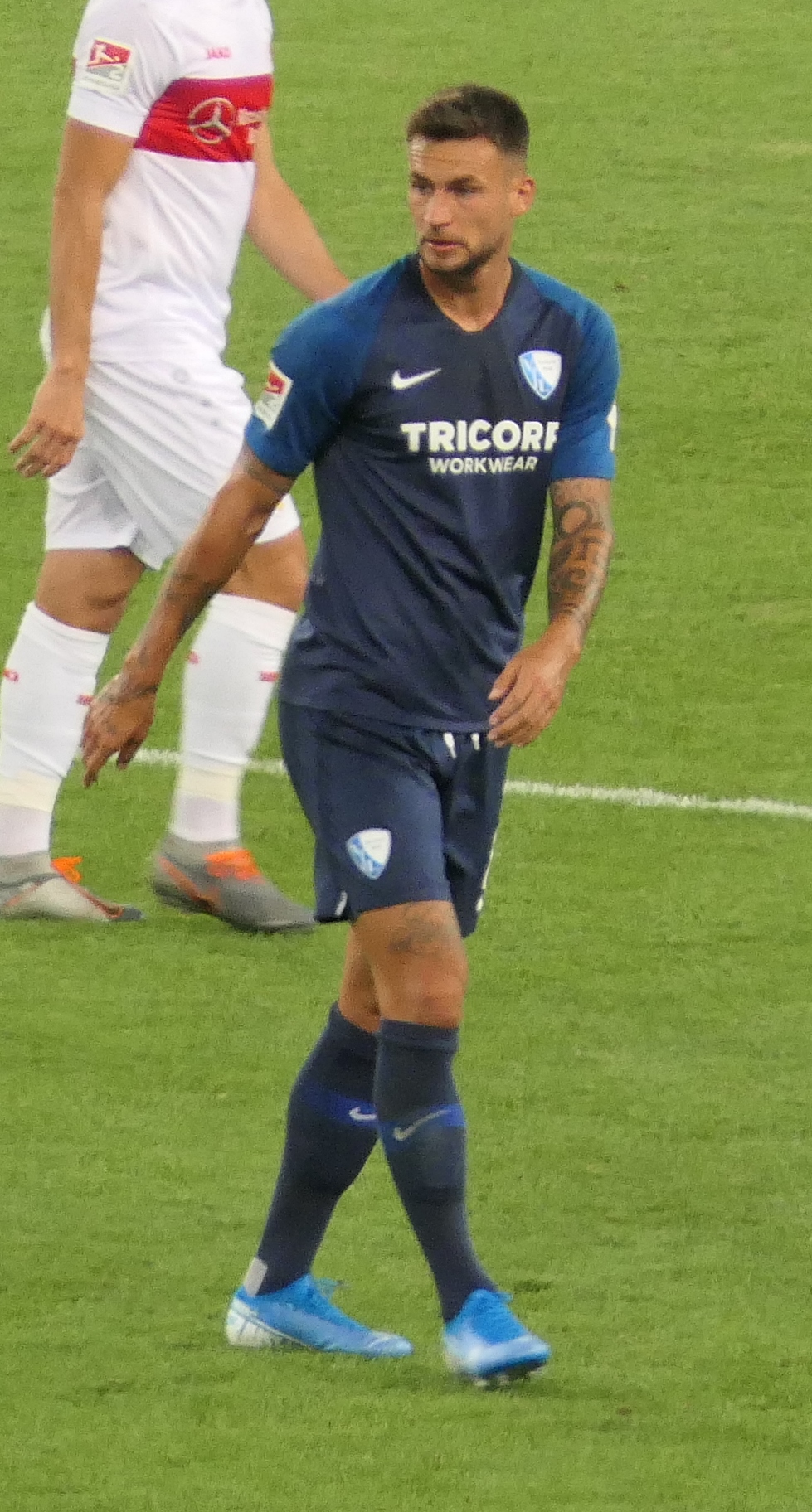
Blum with VFL Bochum in September 2019

On 30 June 2016, Blum's contract ended and he joined Frankfurt on a free transfer. He signed a one-year deal with the option of two more.

He made his debut on 21 August in the first round of the DFB-Pokal away to 1. FC Magdeburg, coming on in the 83rd minute in place of Branimir Hrgota and scoring in a penalty shootout victory. In the quarter-finals on 28 February 2017, he scored the only goal against Arminia Bielefeld at the Commerzbank Arena, in the sixth minute. On 27 May, he played the last 11 minutes of the final, a 2–1 loss to Borussia Dortmund at the Berlin Olympiastadion, in place of Marco Fabián.

In his first league season with Frankfurt, Blum played rarely. His only goal came in the last minute of the season, to achieve a 2–2 home draw with RB Leipzig.

In 2017–18, Blum played only 36 minutes over the whole season, but still scored two goals, one in the second round of the cup in a 4–0 win at 1. FC Schweinfurt 05 on 24 October. Frankfurt won the trophy on 19 May, defeating Bayern Munich 3–1 in the final, but Blum was not in the matchday squad.

On 27 August 2018, Blum moved abroad for the first time in his career, joining Segunda División side UD Las Palmas on a season-long loan deal. Around the turn of the year, he suffered an injury in his left soleus muscle and was ruled out for six to eight weeks, recuperating back at Frankfurt. He played 24 total matches during his time in the Canary Islands, and scored the only goal of a home win against Córdoba CF on 12 May 2019.

=== VfL Bochum ===
On 21 May 2019, Blum signed a two-year contract with 2. Bundesliga club VfL Bochum. He scored a penalty on his debut on 28 July, a 3–1 loss at SSV Jahn Regensburg. On 1 March 2020, he scored a hat-trick in a 4–4 draw against former club Sandhausen, with two in the first eight minutes.

=== APOEL ===
On 27 July 2022, Blum signed a two-year contract with APOEL in Cyprus.

=== Return to 1. FC Nürnberg ===
On 20 January 2023, Blum returned to 1. FC Nürnberg.

=== CF Intercity ===
On 22 February 2024, Blum signed with the Spanish club CF Intercity.

=== TSG Pfeddersheim ===
In the summer of 2024, Blum joined TSG Pfeddersheim in the sixth-tier Verbandsliga Südwest.

== Personal life ==
In the summer of 2014, Blum converted from Christianity to Islam.

== Honours ==
SV Sandhausen

- 3. Liga: 2011–12

Karlsruher SC

- 3. Liga: 2012–13

Eintracht Frankfurt

- DFB-Pokal: 2017–18

VfL Bochum

- 2. Bundesliga: 2020–21
