= Tom Weilandt =

German footballer (born 1992)

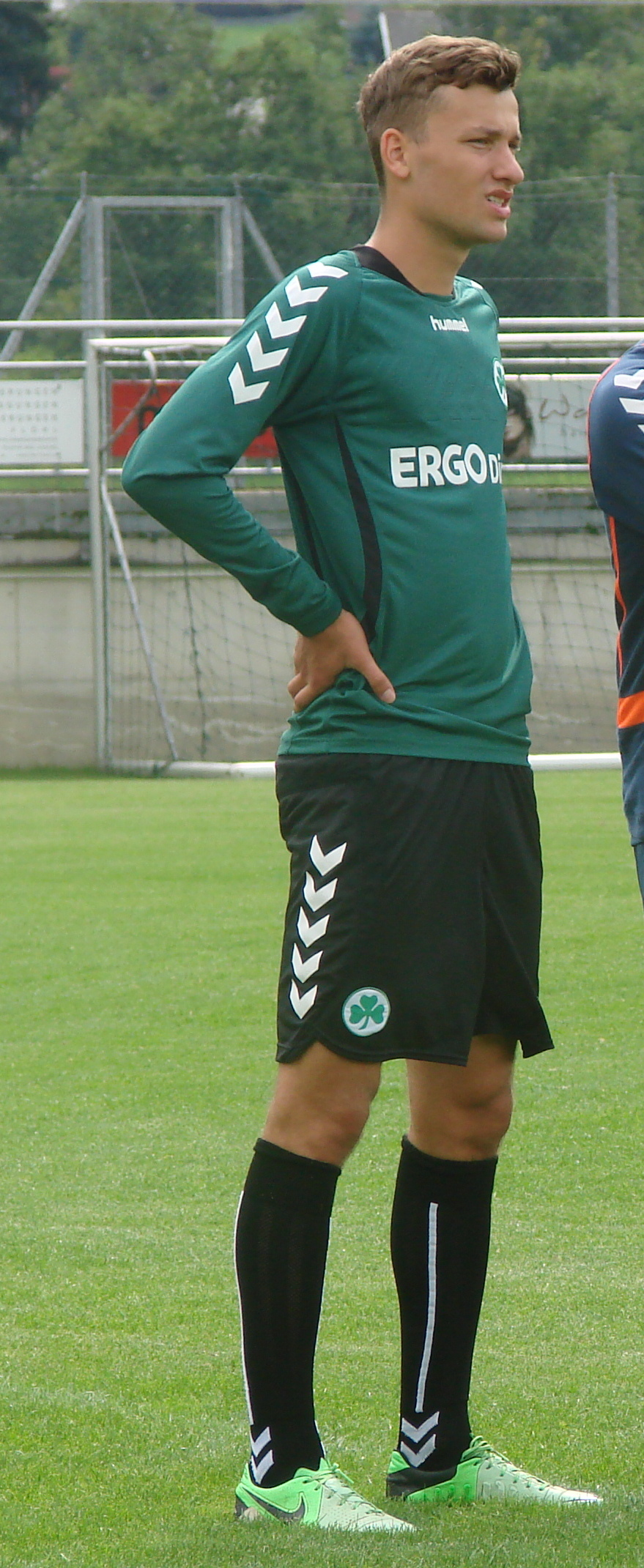
- Weilandt playing for Greuther Fürth in 2013

Personal information
- Date of birth: 27 April 1992 (age 34)
- Place of birth: Rostock, Germany
- Height: 1.87 m (6 ft 2 in)
- Position: Midfielder

Team information
- Current team: Greifswalder FC

Youth career
- 1997–: SV Warnemünde
- –2003: LSG Elmenhorst
- 2003–2011: Hansa Rostock

Senior career*
Years	Team	Apps	(Gls)
2011–2013	Hansa Rostock	59	(8)
2011–2012	→ Hansa Rostock II	4	(3)
2013–2016	Greuther Fürth	62	(10)
2013	→ Greuther Fürth II	1	(1)
2016–2022	VfL Bochum	71	(12)
2017–2018	→ Holstein Kiel (loan)	18	(1)
2022–	Greifswalder FC	39	(7)

International career^{‡}
2009	Germany U18	2	(0)
- * Club domestic league appearances and goals as of 23 April 2024 ‡ National team caps and goals as of 15 December 2009

Tom Weilandt (born 27 April 1992) is a German professional footballer who plays as a midfielder for Regionalliga Nordost club Greifswalder FC.

== Club career ==
Weilandt started playing football with local Rostock clubs SV Warnemünde and LSG Elmenhorst. In 2003, he joined the youth ranks of Hansa Rostock where he also became German under 19 champion in 2010. In the following year he eventually made it to the club's first team squad, making his debut in a 3. Liga match versus SV Wehen Wiesbaden on 30 April 2011.

== International career ==
In 2009, Weilandt earned two caps for the Germany under 18 team.

== Personal life ==
Weilandt is the son of former East Germany international Hilmar Weilandt. His nickname "Hille" is also derived from his father's first name.

In 2025, he was diagnosed with blood cancer and a donation campaign was launched by his former clubs LSG Elmenhorst, SV Warnemünde, Hansa Rostock, VfL Bochum, Holstein Kiel, Greuther Fürth, and his current club, Greifswalder FC.

== Career statistics ==
As of 1 August 2020

Appearances and goals by club, season and competition
Club	Season	League			Cup		Other		Total	
Club	Season	Division	Apps	Goals	Apps	Goals	Apps	Goals	Apps	Goals
Hansa Rostock	2010–11	3. Liga	1	0	0	0	—		1	0
Hansa Rostock	2011–12	2. Bundesliga	24	1	0	0	—		24	1
Hansa Rostock	2012–13	3. Liga	34	7	1	0	—		35	7
Hansa Rostock	Total		59	8	1	0	0	0	60	8
Hansa Rostock II	2011–12	NOFV-Oberliga	4	3	—		—		4	3
Greuther Fürth	2013–14	2. Bundesliga	23	3	1	0	2 (Note: Appearances in the 2. Bundesliga/Bundesliga promotion/relegation playoffs)	0	26	3
Greuther Fürth	2014–15	2. Bundesliga	22	5	2	0	—		24	5
Greuther Fürth	2015–16	2. Bundesliga	17	2	1	0	—		18	2
Greuther Fürth	Total		62	10	4	0	2	0	68	10
Greuther Fürth II	2013–14	Regionalliga Bayern	1	1	—		—		1	1
VfL Bochum	2016–17	2. Bundesliga	22	3	1	0	—		23	3
VfL Bochum	2017–18	2. Bundesliga	0	0	0	0	—		0	0
VfL Bochum	2018–19	2. Bundesliga	27	9	1	0	—		28	9
VfL Bochum	2019–20	2. Bundesliga	22	0	1	0	—		23	0
VfL Bochum	2020–21	2. Bundesliga	0	0	0	0	—		0	0
VfL Bochum	2021–22	Bundesliga	0	0	0	0	—		0	0
VfL Bochum	Total		71	12	3	0	0	0	74	12
Holstein Kiel (loan)	2017–18	2. Bundesliga	18	1	0	0	1	0	19	1
Greifswalder FC	2022–23	Regionalliga Nordost	0	0	—		—		0	0
Career total			215	35	8	0	3	0	226	35
