= 2023–24 VfL Bochum season =

VfL Bochum
2023–24 season
- Chairman: Hans-Peter Villis
- Head coach: Thomas Letsch (until 8 April); Heiko Butscher (from 9 April)
- Stadium: Vonovia-Ruhrstadion
- Bundesliga: 16th (play-off winners)
- DFB-Pokal: First round
- Top goalscorer: League: Kevin Stöger (7); All: Kevin Stöger (8)
- Average home league attendance: 25,393
Home colours	Away colours	Third colours

The 2023–24 season was VfL Bochum's 86th season in existence and third consecutive season in the Bundesliga. They also competed in the DFB-Pokal.

== Players ==
=== First-team squad ===
As of 31 January 2024

Note: Flags indicate national team as defined under FIFA eligibility rules; some limited exceptions apply. Players may hold more than one non-FIFA nationality.

No.	Pos.	Nation	Player
1	GK	GER	Manuel Riemann
2	DF	CRC	Cristian Gamboa
3	DF	BRA	Danilo Soares
4	DF	SRB	Erhan Mašović
5	DF	BRA	Bernardo
6	MF	GER	Patrick Osterhage
7	MF	AUT	Kevin Stöger
8	MF	FRA	Anthony Losilla (captain)
9	FW	POR	Gonçalo Paciência (on loan from Celta Vigo)
10	MF	GER	Philipp Förster
11	FW	JPN	Takuma Asano
13	MF	GER	Lukas Daschner
14	DF	GER	Tim Oermann
15	DF	GER	Felix Passlack
16	GK	GER	Andreas Luthe

No.	Pos.	Nation	Player
17	MF	MKD	Agon Elezi
19	MF	SVK	Matúš Bero
20	DF	UKR	Ivan Ordets (on loan from Dynamo Moscow)
21	GK	GER	Michael Esser
22	FW	GHA	Christopher Antwi-Adjei
23	GK	GER	Niclas Thiede
25	DF	EGY	Mohammed Tolba
27	MF	GER	Moritz Kwarteng
29	FW	GER	Moritz Broschinski
30	DF	GER	Moritz Römling
31	DF	GER	Keven Schlotterbeck (on loan from SC Freiburg)
32	DF	GER	Maximilian Wittek
33	FW	GER	Philipp Hofmann
41	DF	SUI	Noah Loosli

=== Out on loan ===
Note: Flags indicate national team as defined under FIFA eligibility rules; some limited exceptions apply. Players may hold more than one non-FIFA nationality.

No.	Pos.	Nation	Player
—	GK	GER	Paul Grave (at Wuppertaler SV until 30 June 2024)
—	FW	PHI	Gerrit Holtmann (at Darmstadt 98 until 30 June 2024)
—	DF	GHA	Jordi Osei-Tutu (at PAS Giannina until 30 June 2024)
—	MF	GER	Mats Pannewig (at SC Wiedenbrück until 30 June 2024)

== Transfers ==
=== In ===
Pos.	Player	Transferred from	Fee	Date	Source
MF	(Slovakia) Matúš Bero	(Netherlands) Vitesse	Free	1 July 2023	
MF	(Germany) Lukas Daschner	(Germany) FC St. Pauli	Free	1 July 2023	
MF	(Germany) Moritz Kwarteng	(Germany) 1. FC Magdeburg	€1,100,000	1 July 2023	
DF	(Switzerland) Noah Loosli	(Switzerland) Grasshoppers	Free	1 July 2023	
MF	(Germany) Felix Passlack	(Germany) Borussia Dortmund	Free	1 July 2023	
GK	(Germany) Niclas Thiede	(Germany) SC Verl	Free	1 July 2023	
DF	(Brazil) Bernardo	(Austria) RB Salzburg	€400,000	2 August 2023	
DF	(Germany) Maximilian Wittek	(Netherlands) Vitesse	Undisclosed	14 August 2023	
DF	(Germany) Keven Schlotterbeck	(Germany) SC Freiburg	Loan	22 August 2023	
FW	(Portugal) Gonçalo Paciência	(Spain) Celta Vigo	Loan	1 September 2023	
GK	(Germany) Andreas Luthe	(Germany) 1. FC Kaiserslautern	Undisclosed	29 January 2024	
MF	(North Macedonia) Agon Elezi	(Croatia) NK Varaždin	Undisclosed	30 January 2024	

=== Out ===
Pos.	Player	Transferred to	Fee	Date	Source
FW	(Republic of the Congo) Silvère Ganvoula	(Switzerland) BSC Young Boys	Free	1 July 2023	
GK	(Germany) Paul Grave	(Germany) Wuppertaler SV	Loan	1 July 2023	
DF	(Germany) Jannes Horn	(Germany) 1. FC Nürnberg	Free	1 July 2023	
DF	(Greece) Vasilios Lampropoulos		Free	1 July 2023	
DF	(Greece) Kostas Stafylidis		Free	1 July 2023	
FW	(Philippines) Gerrit Holtmann	(Turkey) Antalyaspor	Loan	5 August 2023	
MF	(Poland) Jacek Góralski		Free	10 August 2023	
FW	(Germany) Luis Hartwig	(Belgium) K.V. Oostende	Undisclosed	1 September 2023	
FW	(Germany) Simon Zoller	(Germany) FC St. Pauli	Undisclosed	1 September 2023	
FW	(France) Lys Mousset		Free	9 January 2024	
FW	(Philippines) Gerrit Holtmann	(Germany) Darmstadt 98	Loan	21 January 2024	
DF	(Ghana) Jordi Osei-Tutu	(Greece) PAS Giannina	Loan	22 January 2024	
MF	(Germany) Mats Pannewig	(Germany) SC Wiedenbrück	Loan	31 January 2024	

=== New contracts ===
Position	Player	Until	Ref.
GK	(Germany) Paul Grave	June 2025	

== Pre-season and friendlies ==
Win Draw Loss Fixtures

11 July 2023 Friendly	Kickers Emden	2–9	VfL Bochum	Gevelsberg
18:00 CEST (UTC+2)	Eilerts 39'; Steffen 43'	Report	Zoller 11'; Broschinski 21'; Oermann 49'; Hofmann 50', 58'; Stöger 56' (pen.); Holtmann 80'; Osei-Tutu 82'; Antwi-Adjei 84'	Stadium: Stadion Stefansbachtal; Attendance: 1,700

15 July 2023 Friendly	SC Verl	3–1	VfL Bochum	Verl
15:00 CEST (UTC+2)	Wolfram 39'; Friedrich 81'; Pernot 89'	Report	Ordets 4'	Stadium: Sportclub Arena

21 July 2023 Friendly	Fortuna Düsseldorf	3–1	VfL Bochum	Düsseldorf
18:00 CEST (UTC+2)	Iyoha 7'; Siebert (yellow card) 29'; De Wijs 49'; Appelkamp 83'	Report	Broschinski 79'	Stadium: Paul-Janes-Stadion; Attendance: 4,000

26 July 2023 Friendly	Spezia	4–3	VfL Bochum	Brixen
18:00 CEST (UTC+2)	Sanca 53'; Żurkowski 86'; Römling 93' (o.g.); Pietra 103'		Daschner 25'; Mašović 64'; Hofmann 72'	Stadium: Sportplatz Klaus Seebacher
Note: Match was played in three periods of forty minutes each.

29 July 2023 Friendly	Parma	1–0	VfL Bochum	Brixen
17:00 CEST (UTC+2)	Begić 83'			Stadium: Sportplatz Klaus Seebacher

5 August 2023 Friendly	VfL Bochum	2–1	Luton Town	Bochum
13:30 CEST (UTC+2)	Stöger 9'; Asano 51'	Report	Lockyer 38'	Stadium: Ruhrstadion

5 August 2023 Friendly	VfL Bochum	1–3	Luton Town	Bochum
16:15 CEST (UTC+2)	Bero 17'		Berry 14', 76'; Adebayo 70'	Stadium: Ruhrstadion

7 September 2023 Friendly	VfL Bochum	1–1	Sint-Truiden	Bochum
14:00 CEST (UTC+2)	Loosli 87'	Report	Barnes 46'	Stadium: Leichtathletik-Platz am Vonovia Ruhrstadion

12 October 2023 Friendly	VfL Bochum	1–3	Hannover 96	Bochum
13:30 CEST (UTC+2)	Broschinski 76'	Report	Voglsammer 50', 78'; Momuluh 60+5'	Stadium: Leichtathletik-Platz am Vonovia Ruhrstadion; Referee: Tobias Severins
Note: Match was played in two periods of sixty minutes each.

15 November 2023 Friendly	De Graafschap	1–2	VfL Bochum	Doetinchem, Netherlands
14:00 CET (UTC+1)	Schoppema 38'	Report	Broschinski 4'; Hofmann 82'	Attendance: 0

6 January 2024 Friendly	VfL Bochum	2–1	Groningen
14:00 UTC+1	Kwarteng 62'; Broschinski 84'		[[ ]] (penalty missed) 2'; Slor 82'

7 January 2024 Friendly	VfL Bochum	2–0	Vitesse	Bochum, Germany
14:00 UTC+1	Schlotterbeck 5', 78'			Stadium: Vonovia Ruhrstadion

== Competitions ==
=== Overall record ===
Competition	First match	Last match	Starting round	Final position	Record							
Competition	First match	Last match	Starting round	Final position	Pld	W	D	L	GF	GA	GD	Win %
Bundesliga	19 August 2023	18 May 2024	Matchday 1	16th	34	7	12	15	42	74	−32	20.59
Bundesliga relegation play-offs	23 May 2024	27 May 2024	First leg	Winners	2	1	0	1	3	3	+0	50.00
DFB-Pokal	12 August 2023		First round	First round	1	0	1	0	2	2	+0	0.00
Total					37	8	13	16	47	79	−32	21.62

Source: Soccerway

=== Bundesliga ===
==== League table ====
Pos	Team	Pld	W	D	L	GF	GA	GD	Pts	Qualification or relegation
14	Borussia Mönchengladbach	34	7	13	14	56	67	−11	34	
15	Union Berlin	34	9	6	19	33	58	−25	33	
16	VfL Bochum (O)	34	7	12	15	42	74	−32	33	Qualification for the relegation play-offs
17	1. FC Köln (R)	34	5	12	17	28	60	−32	27	Relegation to 2. Bundesliga
18	Darmstadt 98 (R)	34	3	8	23	30	86	−56	17	Relegation to 2. Bundesliga

Source: DFB
Rules for classification: 1) Points; 2) Goal difference; 3) Goals scored; 4) Head-to-head results; 5) Head-to-head away goals scored; 6) Away goals scored; 7) Play-off.
(O) Play-off winners; (R) Relegated

==== Results summary ====
Overall								Home						Away					
Pld	W	D	L	GF	GA	GD	Pts	W	D	L	GF	GA	GD	W	D	L	GF	GA	GD
34	7	12	15	42	74	−32	33	5	8	4	26	29	−3	2	4	11	16	45	−29

Source: DFB

==== Results by round ====
Round	1	2	3	4	5	6	7	8	9	10	11	12	13	14	15	16	17	18	19	20	21	22	23	24	25	26	27	28	29	30	31	32	33	34
Ground	A	H	A	H	A	H	A	A	H	A	H	A	H	A	H	A	H	H	A	H	A	H	A	H	H	A	H	A	H	A	H	A	H	A
Result	L	D	D	D	L	L	D	L	D	W	D	D	W	L	W	L	D	W	L	D	D	W	L	L	L	L	D	L	D	L	W	W	L	L
Position	18	14	13	13	14	16	16	17	16	14	14	14	12	14	13	14	14	14	14	14	14	11	15	15	15	15	15	15	15	16	15	14	14	16

Source: DFB
A = Away; H = Home; W = Win; D = Draw; L = Loss

==== Matches ====
The league fixtures were unveiled on 30 June 2023.

19 August 2023 1	VfB Stuttgart	5–0	VfL Bochum	Stuttgart
15:30 CEST (UTC+2)	Guirassy 18', 77'; Zagadou 38', (yellow card) 45+4'; Silas 59', 67'	Report	Antwi-Adjei (yellow card) 45+1'	Stadium: MHPArena; Attendance: 53,000; Referee: Daniel Siebert

26 August 2023 2	VfL Bochum	1–1	Borussia Dortmund	Bochum
15:30 CEST (UTC+2)	Stöger 13', (yellow card) 66'; Bero (yellow card) 71'	Report	Malen 56'; Can (yellow card) 75'	Stadium: Vonovia Ruhrstadion; Attendance: 26,000; Referee: Robert Schröder

2 September 2023 3	FC Augsburg	2–2	VfL Bochum	Augsburg
15:30 CEST (UTC+2)	Beljo 35'; Valentin (yellow card) 38'; Rexhbeçaj (yellow card) 44'; Demirović 62'	Report	Asano 45+3', 64'; Bero (yellow card) 46'; Passlack (yellow card) 48'	Stadium: WWK Arena; Attendance: 27,424; Referee: Martin Petersen

16 September 2023 4	VfL Bochum	1–1	Eintracht Frankfurt	Bochum
18:30 CEST (UTC+2)	Stöger (yellow card) 70', (goal) 74' (pen.); Ordets (yellow card) 80'; Mašović (yellow card) 90+4'	Report	Dina Ebimbe 55'; Marmoush (yellow card) 73'; Götze (yellow card) 76'	Stadium: Vonovia Ruhrstadion; Attendance: 26,000; Referee: Benjamin Brand

23 September 2023 5	Bayern Munich	7–0	VfL Bochum	Munich
15:30 CEST (UTC+2)	Choupo-Moting 4'; Kane 13', 54' (pen.), 88'; De Ligt 29'; Sané 38'; Tel 81'	Report	Losilla (yellow card) 26'	Stadium: Allianz Arena; Attendance: 75,000; Referee: Robert Hartmann

30 September 2023 6	VfL Bochum	1–3	Borussia Mönchengladbach	Bochum
15:30 CEST (UTC+2)	Bernardo (yellow card) 52'; Losilla 68'; Gamboa (yellow card) 90+10'	Report	Neuhaus 27'; Pléa 37', 45+3'; Itakura (yellow card) 45+1'; Kramer (yellow card) 81'; Čvančara (yellow card) 90+10'	Stadium: Vonovia Ruhrstadion; Attendance: 26,000; Referee: Felix Brych

7 October 2023 7	RB Leipzig	0–0	VfL Bochum	Munich
15:30 CEST (UTC+2)	Simons (penalty missed) 27', (yellow card) 69'; Baumgartner (yellow card) 47'; Forsberg (penalty missed) 61'	Report	Osterhage (yellow card) 42'; Ordets (yellow card) 55'; Stöger (yellow card) 60'; Schlotterbeck (yellow card) 87'	Stadium: Red Bull Arena; Attendance: 44,269; Referee: Timo Gerach

21 October 2023 8	SC Freiburg	2–1	VfL Bochum	Freiburg
15:30 CEST (UTC+2)	Gulde (yellow card) 23'; Dōan 26'; Grifo (yellow card) 29', (goal) 45+2' (pen.); Eggestein (yellow card) 90+2'	Report	Paciência 15'; Antwi-Adjei (yellow card) 31'; Schlotterbeck (yellow card) 52'; Gamboa (yellow card) 63'; Riemann (yellow card) 65'	Stadium: Europa-Park Stadion; Attendance: 33,900; Referee: Tobias Reichel

27 October 2023 9	VfL Bochum	2–2	Mainz 05	Bochum
20:30 CEST (UTC+2)	Stöger 21' (pen.); Bernardo (yellow card) 51'; Schlotterbeck 82'; Paciência (yellow card) 88'; Losilla (yellow card) 90+5'	Report	Barreiro (yellow card) 15'; Kohr (yellow card) 20'; Schlotterbeck 59' (o.g.); Lee (yellow card) 71'; Krauß 90+6'	Stadium: Vonovia Ruhrstadion; Attendance: 26,000; Referee: Patrick Ittrich

3 November 2023 10	Darmstadt 98	1–2	VfL Bochum	Darmstadt
20:30 CET (UTC+1)	Nürnberger 43'; Klarer (yellow card) 67'; Holland (red card) 70'; Skarke (yellow card) 90+4'	Report	Asano 25', 54'; Losilla (yellow card) 42'; Gamboa (yellow card) 67'; Schlotterbeck (yellow card) 68'; Kwarteng (yellow card) 87'; Paciência (yellow card) 90+4'	Stadium: Merck-Stadion am Böllenfalltor; Attendance: 17,810; Referee: Marco Fritz

11 November 2023 11	VfL Bochum	1–1	1. FC Köln	Bochum
18:30 CET (UTC+1)	Daschner 25', (yellow card) 77'; Hofmann (yellow card) 33'; Mašović (yellow card) 40'; Bernardo (yellow card) 90'	Report	Selke 54'; Thielmann (yellow card) 89'	Stadium: Vonovia Ruhrstadion; Attendance: 26,000; Referee: Matthias Jöllenbeck

26 November 2023 12	1. FC Heidenheim	0–0	VfL Bochum	Heidenheim
15:30 CET (UTC+1)	Dinkçi (yellow card) 51'; Schöppner (yellow card) 51'; Beste (yellow card) 58'; Traoré (yellow card) 77'	Report	Daschner (yellow card) 27'; Schlotterbeck (yellow card) 65'; Antwi-Adjei (yellow card) 90+3'	Stadium: Voith-Arena; Attendance: 15,000; Referee: Felix Zwayer

2 December 2023 13	VfL Bochum	3–1	VfL Wolfsburg	Bochum
15:30 CET (UTC+1)	Osterhage 19'; Bero (yellow card) 36'; Bernardo 39'; Stöger (yellow card) 45+2'; Asano (yellow card) 62'; Gamboa (yellow card) 81'; Wittek (yellow card) 86'; Antwi-Adjei 87'; Schlotterbeck (yellow card) 90+2'		Vranckx (yellow card) 21'; Svanberg 45+1'; Jenz (yellow card) 53'	Stadium: Vonovia Ruhrstadion; Attendance: 24,350; Referee: Robert Schröder

8 December 2023 14	1899 Hoffenheim	3–1	VfL Bochum	Sinsheim
20:30 CET (UTC+1)	Mašović 32' (o.g.); Tohumcu (yellow card) 41'; Kramarić 43', (yellow card) 51'; Prömel (yellow card) 53'; Bebou 76'	Report	Mašović (yellow card) 60'; Riemann (yellow card) 63'; Paciência 90'	Stadium: Rhein-Neckar-Arena; Attendance: 16,023; Referee: Matthias Jöllenbeck

16 December 2023 15	VfL Bochum	3–0	Union Berlin	Bochum
15:30 CET (UTC+1)	Osterhage (yellow card) 20'; Asano 45+5'; Paciência 54'; Stöger 78' (pen.), (yellow card) 90+1'	Report	Khedira (yellow card) 42'; Roussillon (yellow card) 85'	Stadium: Vonovia Ruhrstadion; Attendance: 25,300; Referee: Sven Jablonski

20 December 2023 16	Bayer Leverkusen	4–0	VfL Bochum	Leverkusen
20:30 CET (UTC+1)	Schick 30' (pen.), 32', 45+1'; Boniface 69'	Report	Mašović (yellow card) 39'; Schlotterbeck (yellow card) 51'	Stadium: BayArena; Attendance: 30,210; Referee: Daniel Schlager

14 January 2024 17	VfL Bochum	1–1	Werder Bremen	Bochum
15:30 CET (UTC+1)	Gamboa (yellow card) 3'; Stöger (yellow card) 25'; Osterhage 64'; Bero (yellow card) 72'; Losilla (yellow card) 75'; Riemann (yellow card) 90+4'; Bernardo (yellow card) 90+5'	Report	Jung (yellow card) 25'; Stage (yellow card) 35'; Bittencourt (yellow card) 42'; Stark (yellow card) 66', (goal) 90+3'; Ducksch (yellow card) 82'	Stadium: Vonovia Ruhrstadion; Attendance: 26,000; Referee: Tobias Stieler

20 January 2024 18	VfL Bochum	1–0	VfB Stuttgart	Bochum
15:30 CET (UTC+1)	Bernardo (yellow card) 36'; Antwi-Adjei (yellow card) 41'; Förster (yellow card) 42'; Bero 50'; Wittek (yellow card) 90+5'; Broschinski (yellow card) 90+6'	Report	Karazor (yellow card) 35'; Massimo (yellow card) 90+1'; Vagnoman (yellow card) 90+5'	Stadium: Vonovia Ruhrstadion; Attendance: 26,000; Referee: Bastian Dankert

28 January 2024 19	Borussia Dortmund	3–1	VfL Bochum	Dortmund
17:30 CET (UTC+1)	Füllkrug 7' (pen.), 72', 90+1' (pen.); Malen (yellow card) 56'	Report	Riemann (yellow card) 3'; Schlotterbeck 45' (o.g.); Wittek (yellow card) 59'; Gamboa (yellow card) 89'	Stadium: Signal Iduna Park; Attendance: 81,365; Referee: Benjamin Brand

3 February 2024 20	VfL Bochum	1–1	FC Augsburg	Bochum
15:30 CET (UTC+1)	Broschinski 33', (yellow card) 44'; Oermann (yellow card) 45+4'; Osterhage (yellow card) 76'	Report	Jakić (yellow card) 70'; Demirović 90+1' (pen.)	Stadium: Vonovia Ruhrstadion; Attendance: 24,500; Referee: Patrick Ittrich

10 February 2024 21	Eintracht Frankfurt	1–1	VfL Bochum	Frankfurt
15:30 CET (UTC+1)	Marmoush 14'; Pacho (yellow card) 53'; Koch (yellow card) 80'	Report	Broschinski 17'; Oermann (yellow card) 35'; Bero (yellow card) 90+2'	Stadium: Deutsche Bank Park; Attendance: 57,500; Referee: Sven Jablonski

18 February 2024 22	VfL Bochum	3–2	Bayern Munich	Bochum
17:30 CET (UTC+1)	Asano 38'; Schlotterbeck 44'; Bernardo (yellow card) 45'; Losilla (yellow card) 45+6'; Stöger 78' (pen.)	Report	Musiala 14'; Upamecano (yellow card) 39' (yellow-red card) 77'; Goretzka (yellow card) 50'; Kim (yellow card) 59'; Kane 87'	Stadium: Vonovia Ruhrstadion; Attendance: 26,000; Referee: Daniel Schlager

24 February 2024 23	Borussia Mönchengladbach	5–2	VfL Bochum	Mönchengladbach
15:30 CET (UTC+1)	Ngoumou 28'; Weigl 35' (pen.); Lainer (yellow card) 45+2'; Neuhaus (yellow card) 45+4'; Reitz 72'; Pefok 78'; Honorat 90+6'	Report	Mašović (yellow card) 30'; Riemann (yellow card) 45+4'; Stöger (yellow card) 45+4'; Schlotterbeck (yellow card) 64', (goal) 88'; Hofmann 75'	Stadium: Borussia-Park; Attendance: 53,196; Referee: Sven Jablonski

2 March 2024 24	VfL Bochum	1–4	RB Leipzig	Bochum
15:30 CET (UTC+1)	Wittek 7'; Broschinski (yellow card) 38'; Loosli (yellow card) 66'; Ordets (yellow card) 77'; Kwarteng (red card) 86'	Report	Olmo 30'; Haidara (yellow card) 45+3'; Openda 68'; Ordets 71' (o.g.); Poulsen 72'; Simakan (yellow card) 81'	Stadium: Vonovia Ruhrstadion; Attendance: 24,200; Referee: Harm Osmers

10 March 2024 25	VfL Bochum	1–2	SC Freiburg	Bochum
15:30 CET (UTC+1)	Bernardo (yellow card) 33'; Mašović (yellow card) 45+4'; Ordets 62'; Losilla (yellow card) 82'	Report	Höfler (yellow card) 34'; Eggestein 36', (yellow card) 42'; Sallai (yellow card) 45+4'; Gregoritsch 53'; Gulde (yellow card) 59'; Höler (yellow card) 74'; Günter (yellow card) 83'; Kübler (yellow card) 90+2'	Stadium: Vonovia Ruhrstadion; Attendance: 25,594; Referee: Marco Fritz

16 March 2024 26	Mainz 05	2–0	VfL Bochum	Mainz
15:30 CET (UTC+1)	Kohr (yellow card) 1'; Ajorque (yellow card) 8'; Burkardt 45+3' (pen.), 71'; Van den Berg (yellow card) 84'; Amiri (yellow card) 88'	Report	Bernardo (yellow card) 33'; Osterhage (yellow card) 47'; Schlotterbeck (yellow card) 87'	Stadium: Mewa Arena; Attendance: 33,000; Referee: Matthias Jöllenbeck

31 March 2024 27	VfL Bochum	2–2	Darmstadt 98	Bochum
19:30 CEST (UTC+2)	Mašović (yellow card) 8'; Hofmann 30', 48'; Losilla (yellow card) 53'	Report	Klarer (yellow card) 53'; Skarke 62'; Vilhelmsson 76'; Gjasula (yellow card) 85'	Stadium: Vonovia Ruhrstadion; Attendance: 25,023; Referee: Sven Jablonski

6 April 2024 28	1. FC Köln	2–1	VfL Bochum	Cologne
15:30 CEST (UTC+2)	Martel (yellow card) 25'; Selke (yellow card) 37'; Thielmann (yellow card) 71'; Tigges 90+1'; Waldschmidt 90+2'	Report	Broschinski (yellow card) 35'; Passlack 53'; Asano (yellow card) 68'; Losilla (yellow card) 89'	Stadium: RheinEnergieStadion; Attendance: 50,000; Referee: Tobias Welz

13 April 2024 29	VfL Bochum	1–1	1. FC Heidenheim	Bochum
15:30 CEST (UTC+2)	Passlack (yellow card) 35'; Bernardo (yellow card) 45'; Losilla (yellow card) 52'; Bero (yellow card) 58'; Schlotterbeck 90'	Report	Kleindienst (yellow card) 60'; Schlotterbeck 81' (o.g.)	Stadium: Vonovia Ruhrstadion; Attendance: 24,414; Referee: Patrick Ittrich

20 April 2024 30	VfL Wolfsburg	1–0	VfL Bochum	Wolfsburg
15:30 CEST (UTC+2)	Bornauw (yellow card) 37'; Wind 43'; Tomás (yellow card) 53'; Paredes (yellow card) 68'; Vranckx (yellow card) 85'	Report	Osterhage (yellow card) 12'; Antwi-Adjei (yellow card) 86'; Stöger (yellow card) 90+5'	Stadium: Volkswagen Arena; Attendance: 26,327; Referee: Tobias Reichel

26 April 2024 31	VfL Bochum	3–2	1899 Hoffenheim	Bochum
20:30 CEST (UTC+2)	Losilla (yellow card) 31'; Stöger 34', 64'; Passlack 45+2'	Report	Tohumcu (yellow card) 33'; Kramarić 73', 84'	Stadium: Vonovia Ruhrstadion; Attendance: 24,300; Referee: Tobias Stieler

5 May 2024 32	Union Berlin	3–4	VfL Bochum	Berlin
15:30 CEST (UTC+2)	Vertessen 59'; Bedia 48'; Hollerbach 74'	Report	Wittek 16', 31'; Schlotterbeck 37'; Hofmann 70'; Gamboa (yellow card) 90+5'	Stadium: Stadion An der Alten Försterei; Attendance: 22,012; Referee: Marco Fritz

12 May 2024 33	VfL Bochum	0–5	Bayer Leverkusen	Bochum
19:30 CEST (UTC+2)	Passlack (red card) 15'; Schlotterbeck (yellow card) 45+1'; Ordets (yellow card) 63'	Report	Tella (yellow card) 27'; Schick 41'; Boniface 45+2' (pen.); Adli 76'; Stanišić 86'; Grimaldo 90+3'	Stadium: Vonovia Ruhrstadion; Attendance: 26,000; Referee: Benjamin Brand

18 May 2024 34	Werder Bremen	4–1	VfL Bochum	Bremen
15:30 CEST (UTC+2)	Griedl 6'; Lynen (yellow card) 36'; Jung 78'; Stage 80'; Schmid 87'	Report	Wittek (yellow card) 37'; Antwi-Adjei 85'	Stadium: Weserstadion; Attendance: 42,100; Referee: Martin Petersen

==== Relegation play-offs ====
23 May 2024 First leg	VfL Bochum	0–3	Fortuna Düsseldorf	Bochum
20:30 CEST (UTC+2)	Bernardo (yellow card) 71'; Losilla (yellow card) 90+3'	Report	Hofmann 13' (o.g.); Klaus 64'; Engelhardt 72'	Stadium: Vonovia Ruhrstadion; Attendance: 26,000; Referee: Robert Schröder

27 May 2024 Second leg	Fortuna Düsseldorf	0–3 (a.e.t.) (3–3 agg.) (5–6 p)	VfL Bochum	Düsseldorf
20:30 CEST (UTC+2)	Engelhardt (yellow card) 103'	Report	Hofmann (yellow card) 5', (goal) 18', 66'; Oermann (yellow card) 8'; Wittek (yellow card) 39'; Stöger 70' (pen.); Mašović (yellow card) 106'	Stadium: Merkur Spiel-Arena; Attendance: 51,500; Referee: Deniz Aytekin
	Penalties
	Hofmann (penalty missed); Jóhannesson (penalty scored); Engelhardt (penalty scored); Oberdorf (penalty scored); Tzolis (penalty scored); Niemiec (penalty scored); Uchino (penalty missed)		(penalty scored) Paciência; (penalty scored) Bero; (penalty missed) Mašović; (penalty scored) Asano; (penalty scored) Stöger; (penalty scored) Schlotterbeck; (penalty scored) Wittek

=== DFB-Pokal ===
12 August 2023 First round	Arminia Bielefeld	2–2 (a.e.t.) (4–1 p)	VfL Bochum	Bielefeld
18:00	Shipnoski 25'; Biankadi 29'; Yildirim (yellow card) 33'; Belkahia (yellow card) 56'; Schreck (yellow card) 90+4'; Kersken (yellow card) 115'; Boujellab (yellow card) 120+1'	Report	Asano 45+2'; Mašović (yellow card) 82'; Zoller 90+1' (yellow card) 115'; Bero (yellow card) 108'	Stadium: Schüco-Arena; Attendance: 21,452; Referee: Sven Jablonski
	Penalties
	Klos (penalty scored); Gohlke (penalty scored); Wintzheimer (penalty scored); Mizuta (penalty scored)		(penalty missed) Hofmann; (penalty missed) Stöger; (penalty scored) Mašović

== Statistics ==
=== Appearances and goals ===
No.	Pos	Nat	Player	Total		Bundesliga		DFB-Pokal	
No.	Pos	Nat	Player	Apps	Goals	Apps	Goals	Apps	Goals
Goalkeepers
1	GK	(Germany) GER	Manuel Riemann	24	0	23	0	1	0
16	GK	(Germany) GER	Andreas Luthe	1	0	1	0	0	0
21	GK	(Germany) GER	Michael Esser	0	0	0	0	0	0
23	GK	(Germany) GER	Niclas Thiede	0	0	0	0	0	0
Defenders
2	DF	(Costa Rica) CRC	Cristian Gamboa	18	0	12+5	0	0+1	0
3	DF	(Brazil) BRA	Danilo Soares	5	0	3+2	0	0	0
4	DF	(Serbia) SRB	Erhan Mašović	21	0	18+2	0	1	0
5	DF	(Brazil) BRA	Bernardo	24	1	23	1	1	0
14	DF	(Germany) GER	Tim Oermann	11	0	6+5	0	0	0
15	DF	(Germany) GER	Felix Passlack	8	0	6+1	0	1	0
20	DF	(Ukraine) UKR	Ivan Ordets	17	0	15+1	0	1	0
25	DF	(Egypt) EGY	Mohammed Tolba	0	0	0	0	0	0
31	DF	(Germany) GER	Keven Schlotterbeck	17	3	14+3	3	0	0
32	DF	(Germany) GER	Maximilian Wittek	13	1	9+4	1	0	0
41	DF	(Switzerland) SUI	Noah Loosli	10	0	2+8	0	0	0
Midfielders
6	MF	(Germany) GER	Patrick Osterhage	17	2	13+3	2	0+1	0
7	MF	(Austria) AUT	Kevin Stöger	23	5	22	5	1	0
8	MF	(France) FRA	Anthony Losilla	23	1	22	1	1	0
10	MF	(Germany) GER	Philipp Förster	11	0	2+9	0	0	0
11	MF	(Japan) JPN	Takuma Asano	21	7	20	6	1	1
13	MF	(Germany) GER	Lukas Daschner	13	1	2+10	1	1	0
19	MF	(Slovakia) SVK	Matúš Bero	17	1	15+1	1	0+1	0
27	MF	(Germany) GER	Moritz Kwarteng	11	0	2+9	0	0	0
	MF	(North Macedonia) MKD	Agon Elezi	0	0	0	0	0	0
Forwards
9	FW	(Portugal) POR	Gonçalo Paciência	16	3	7+9	3	0	0
22	FW	(Ghana) GHA	Christopher Antwi-Adjei	21	1	10+10	1	1	0
29	FW	(Germany) GER	Moritz Broschinski	18	2	8+9	2	0+1	0
33	FW	(Germany) GER	Philipp Hofmann	20	1	10+9	1	1	0
Players transferred out during the season
9	FW	(Germany) GER	Simon Zoller	2	1	0+1	0	0+1	1
18	DF	(Ghana) GHA	Jordi Osei-Tutu	0	0	0	0	0	0
24	MF	(Germany) GER	Mats Pannewig	0	0	0	0	0	0

Last updated: 2 March 2024
Source: Competitions

=== Goalscorers ===
As of 3 March 2024

Rank	No.	Pos.	Nat.	Player	Bundesliga	DFB-Pokal	Total
1	11	MF	(Japan)	Takuma Asano	6	1	7
2	7	MF	(Austria)	Kevin Stöger	5	0	5
3	9	FW	(Portugal)	Gonçalo Paciência	3	0	3
3	31	DF	(Germany)	Keven Schlotterbeck	3	0	3
5	6	MF	(Germany)	Patrick Osterhage	2	0	2
5	29	FW	(Germany)	Moritz Broschinski	2	0	2
6	8	MF	(France)	Anthony Losilla	1	0	1
6	9	FW	(Germany)	Simon Zoller	0	1	1
6	8	MF	(Germany)	Lukas Daschner	1	0	1
6	5	DF	(Brazil)	Bernardo	1	0	1
6	22	FW	(Germany)	Christopher Antwi-Adjei	1	0	1
6	19	MF	(Slovakia)	Matúš Bero	1	0	1
6	33	FW	(Germany)	Philipp Hofmann	1	0	1
6	32	DF	(Germany)	Maximilian Wittek	1	0	1
Own goals					1	0	0
Totals					29	2	31
