= 2022–23 VfL Bochum season =

VfL Bochum
2022–23 season
- Chairman: Hans-Peter Villis
- Head coach: Thomas Reis (until 12 September); Heiko Butscher (caretaker, 12–22 September); Thomas Letsch (from 22 September)
- Stadium: Vonovia-Ruhrstadion
- Bundesliga: 14th
- DFB-Pokal: Round of 16
- Top goalscorer: League: Philipp Hofmann (8); All: Philipp Hofmann (9)
- Biggest win: Viktoria Berlin 0–3 VfL Bochum; VfL Bochum 3–0 Eintracht Frankfurt; VfL Bochum 5–2 1899 Hoffenheim; VfL Bochum 3–0 Bayer Leverkusen
- Biggest defeat: VfL Bochum 0–7 Bayern Munich
Home colours	Away colours	Third colours

The 2022–23 season was the 85th season in the history of VfL Bochum and their second consecutive season in the top flight. The club participated in the Bundesliga and DFB-Pokal.

== Players ==
=== First-team squad ===
As of 31 January 2023

Note: Flags indicate national team as defined under FIFA eligibility rules; some limited exceptions apply. Players may hold more than one non-FIFA nationality.

No.	Pos.	Nation	Player
1	GK	GER	Manuel Riemann (vice-captain)
2	DF	CRC	Cristian Gamboa
3	DF	BRA	Danilo Soares
4	DF	SRB	Erhan Mašović
5	MF	POL	Jacek Góralski
6	MF	GER	Patrick Osterhage
7	MF	AUT	Kevin Stöger
8	MF	FRA	Anthony Losilla (captain)
9	FW	GER	Simon Zoller
10	MF	GER	Philipp Förster
11	FW	JPN	Takuma Asano
16	DF	GRE	Kostas Stafylidis
17	FW	PHI	Gerrit Holtmann
18	DF	ENG	Jordi Osei-Tutu
20	DF	UKR	Ivan Ordets (on loan from Dynamo Moscow)
21	GK	GER	Michael Esser

No.	Pos.	Nation	Player
22	MF	GHA	Christopher Antwi-Adjei
23	DF	GAM	Saidy Janko (on loan from Real Valladolid)
24	DF	GRE	Vasilios Lampropoulos
25	DF	GER	Mohammed Tolba
26	GK	SWE	Marko Johansson (on loan from Hamburger SV)
28	MF	CMR	Pierre Kunde (on loan from Olympiacos)
29	FW	GER	Moritz Broschinski
30	DF	GER	Dominique Heintz (on loan from Union Berlin)
31	DF	GER	Keven Schlotterbeck (on loan from SC Freiburg)
33	FW	GER	Philipp Hofmann
34	GK	GER	Paul Grave
35	FW	CGO	Silvère Ganvoula

=== Out on loan ===
Note: Flags indicate national team as defined under FIFA eligibility rules; some limited exceptions apply. Players may hold more than one non-FIFA nationality.

No.	Pos.	Nation	Player
—	FW	GER	Luis Hartwig (at St. Pölten until 30 June 2023)
—	DF	GER	Jannes Horn (at 1. FC Nürnberg until 30 June 2023)
—	FW	FRA	Lys Mousset (at Nîmes Olympique until 30 June 2023)
—	DF	GER	Tim Oermann (at Wolfsberger AC until 30 June 2023)
—	DF	GER	Moritz Römling (at RW Essen until 30 June 2023)

== Transfers ==
=== In ===
No.	Pos.	Player	Transferred from	Fee	Date	Source
5	MF	(Poland) Jacek Góralski	(Kazakhstan) Kairat	Free	1 July 2022	
7	MF	(Germany) Kevin Stöger	(Germany) Mainz 05	Free	1 July 2022	
10	MF	(Germany) Philipp Förster	(Germany) VfB Stuttgart	€500,000	1 July 2022	
18	DF	(England) Jordi Osei-Tutu	(England) Arsenal	Free	1 July 2022	
23	DF	(The Gambia) Saidy Janko	(Spain) Real Valladolid	Loan	1 July 2022	
33	FW	(Germany) Philipp Hofmann	(Germany) Karlsruher SC	Free	1 July 2022	
16	DF	(Greece) Kostas Stafylidis	(Germany) 1899 Hoffenheim	€250,000	6 July 2022	
20	DF	(Ukraine) Ivan Ordets	(Russia) Dynamo Moscow	Loan	10 July 2022	
38	DF	(Germany) Jannes Horn	(Germany) 1. FC Köln	Free	25 July 2022	
30	DF	(Germany) Dominique Heintz	(Germany) Union Berlin	Loan	11 August 2022	
39	FW	(France) Lys Mousset	(England) Sheffield United	Free	15 August 2022	
26	GK	(Sweden) Marko Johansson	(Germany) Hamburger SV	Loan	1 September 2022	
31	DF	(Germany) Keven Schlotterbeck	(Germany) SC Freiburg	Loan	2 January 2023	
28	MF	(Cameroon) Pierre Kunde	(Greece) Olympiacos	Loan	6 January 2023	
29	FW	(Germany) Moritz Broschinski	(Germany) Borussia Dortmund II	Undisclosed	22 January 2023	

=== Out ===
No.	Pos.	Player	Transferred to	Fee	Date	Source
5	DF	(Switzerland) Saulo Decarli	(Germany) Eintracht Braunschweig	Free	1 July 2022	
7	FW	(Germany) Danny Blum		Free	1 July 2022	
11	DF	(Uganda) Herbert Bockhorn		Free	1 July 2022	
14	MF	(Germany) Tom Weilandt	(Germany) Greifswalder FC	Free	1 July 2022	
19	FW	(Netherlands) Jürgen Locadia	(Iran) Persepolis	Free	1 July 2022	
23	MF	(Germany) Robert Tesche	(Germany) VfL Osnabrück	Free	1 July 2022	
27	FW	(Serbia) Miloš Pantović	(Germany) Union Berlin	Free	1 July 2022	
29	DF	(Germany) Maxim Leitsch	(Germany) Mainz 05	€3,500,000	1 July 2022	
37	DF	(Germany) Armel Bella-Kotchap	(England) Southampton	€10,000,000	1 July 2022	
40	FW	(Germany) Sebastian Polter	(Germany) Schalke 04	€1,500,000	1 July 2022	
28	FW	(Germany) Luis Hartwig	(Austria) St. Pölten	Loan	14 July 2022	
30	DF	(Germany) Moritz Römling	(Germany) RW Essen	Loan	15 July 2022	
38	DF	(Germany) Jannes Horn	(Germany) 1. FC Nürnberg	Loan	7 January 2023	
14	DF	(Germany) Tim Oermann	(Austria) Wolfsberger AC	Loan	24 January 2023	
32	FW	(Germany) Tarsis Bonga	(Germany) Eintracht Braunschweig	Undisclosed	24 January 2023	
39	FW	(France) Lys Mousset	(France) Nîmes Olympique	Loan	31 January 2023	

== Pre-season and friendlies ==
Win Draw Loss Fixtures

25 June 2022 Friendly	Wuppertaler SV	0–2	VfL Bochum	Wuppertal, Germany
13:00 CEST (UTC+2)		Report	Hofmann 4'; Ganvoula 88'	Stadium: Stadion am Zoo

29 June 2022 Friendly	1. FC Monheim	1–1	VfL Bochum	Monheim, Germany
18:30 CEST (UTC+2)	Kussunga 13'	Report	Ganvoula 25'	Stadium: Rheinstadion

2 July 2022 Friendly	FC Bocholt	1–3	VfL Bochum	Bocholt, Germany
14:00 CEST (UTC+2)	Fakhro 43'	Report	Osei-Tutu 57'; Ganvoula 73', 75'	Stadium: Gigaset Arena

6 July 2022 Friendly	Fortuna Sittard	1–1	VfL Bochum	Nederweert-Eind, Netherlands
18:00 CEST (UTC+2)	Noslin 23'	Report	Stöger 77'	Stadium: Sportpark Op de Hooven

8 July 2022 Friendly	SC Paderborn	2–0	VfL Bochum	Paderborn, Germany
18:30 CEST (UTC+2)	Muslija 40' (pen.); Heuer 58'	Report		Stadium: Home Deluxe Arena

13 July 2022 Friendly	VfL Bochum	3–2	Lecce	Brixen, Italy
17:30 CEST (UTC+2)	Stöger 33'; Holtmann 42'; Ganvoula 64'	Report	Colombo 14', 17'	Stadium: Sportplatz Klaus Seebacher

16 July 2022 Friendly	Spezia	1–2	VfL Bochum	Brixen, Italy
16:30 CEST (UTC+2)	Agudelo 84'	Report	Asano 63'; Losilla 66'	Stadium: Sportplatz Klaus Seebacher

21 July 2022 Friendly	VfL Bochum	1–4	Athletic Bilbao	Gütersloh, Germany
18:00 CEST (UTC+2)	Zoller 58'	Report	Vesga (yellow card) 38'; R. García 65'; Villalibre 82', 88'; I. Williams 84'	Stadium: Heidewaldstadion; Referee: Florian Exner (Germany)

23 July 2022 Friendly	VfL Bochum	6–2	Antalyaspor	Bochum, Germany
15:30 CEST (UTC+2)	Ordets 41'; Zoller 45'; Asano 56', 58'; Osei-Tutu 75'; Holtmann 77'		Ghacha 16'; Wright 68'	Stadium: Ruhrstadion; Attendance: 6,472; Referee: Arne Aarnink (Germany)

22 September 2022 Friendly	VfL Bochum	Cancelled	Fortuna Düsseldorf	Bochum, Germany
14:00 CEST (UTC+2)
Note: The game was cancelled due to a shortage of players at Fortuna Düsseldorf.

7 December 2022 Friendly	VfL Bochum	1–3	PEC Zwolle	Bochum, Germany
14:00 CET (UTC+1)	Holtmann 8'	Report	van Polen 21' (pen.); Lagsir 37'; Thy 69'

10 December 2022 Friendly	VfL Bochum	1–2	Karlsruher SC	Bochum, Germany
13:15 CET (UTC+1)	Hofmann 82'	Report	O'Shaughnessy 23'; Cueto 71'	Stadium: Nebenplatz Ruhrstadion

16 December 2022 Friendly	SC Paderborn	1–1	VfL Bochum	Paderborn, Germany
13:00 CET (UTC+1)				Stadium: Trainings- und Nachwuchsleistungszentrum Platz 1

10 January 2023 Friendly	Grasshoppers	1–1	VfL Bochum	Jerez de la Frontera, Spain
15:00 CET (UTC+1)				Stadium: Campo Hotel Barceló Montecastillo

13 January 2023 Friendly	VfL Bochum	0–3	Diósgyőr	La Línea de la Concepción, Spain
11:15 CET (UTC+1)				Stadium: Estadio Municipal de La Línea de la Concepción

13 January 2023 Friendly	VfL Bochum	1–1	Luzern	La Línea de la Concepción, Spain
15:15 CET (UTC+1)				Stadium: Estadio Municipal de La Línea de la Concepción

== Competitions ==
=== Overall record ===
Competition	First match	Last match	Starting round	Final position	Record							
Competition	First match	Last match	Starting round	Final position	Pld	W	D	L	GF	GA	GD	Win %
Bundesliga	6 August 2022	27 May 2023	Matchday 1	14th	34	10	5	19	40	72	−32	29.41
DFB-Pokal	30 July 2022	8 February 2023	First round	Round of 16	3	2	0	1	5	2	+3	66.67
Total					37	12	5	20	45	74	−29	32.43

Source: Soccerway

=== Bundesliga ===
==== League table ====
Pos	Team	Pld	W	D	L	GF	GA	GD	Pts	Qualification or relegation
12	1899 Hoffenheim	34	10	6	18	48	57	−9	36	
13	Werder Bremen	34	10	6	18	51	64	−13	36	
14	VfL Bochum	34	10	5	19	40	72	−32	35	
15	FC Augsburg	34	9	7	18	42	63	−21	34	
16	VfB Stuttgart (O)	34	7	12	15	45	57	−12	33	Qualification for the relegation play-offs

Source: DFB
Rules for classification: 1) Points; 2) Goal difference; 3) Goals scored; 4) Head-to-head results; 5) Head-to-head away goals scored; 6) Away goals scored; 7) Play-off.
(O) Play-off winners

==== Results summary ====
Overall								Home						Away					
Pld	W	D	L	GF	GA	GD	Pts	W	D	L	GF	GA	GD	W	D	L	GF	GA	GD
34	10	5	19	40	72	−32	35	8	2	7	28	32	−4	2	3	12	12	40	−28

Source: DFB

==== Results by round ====
Round	1	2	3	4	5	6	7	8	9	10	11	12	13	14	15	16	17	18	19	20	21	22	23	24	25	26	27	28	29	30	31	32	33	34
Ground	H	A	H	A	H	A	H	A	H	A	H	A	A	H	A	H	A	A	H	A	H	A	H	A	H	A	H	A	H	H	A	H	A	H
Result	L	L	L	L	L	L	D	L	W	L	W	L	L	W	W	W	L	L	W	L	L	L	L	W	W	D	L	D	L	D	L	W	D	W
Position	12	17	18	18	18	18	18	18	18	18	17	17	17	17	17	14	16	16	15	15	16	17	18	14	14	14	15	15	15	16	17	15	16	14

Source: DFB
A = Away; H = Home; W = Win; D = Draw; L = Loss

==== Matches ====
The league fixtures were announced on 17 June 2022.

6 August 2022 1	VfL Bochum	1–2	Mainz 05	Bochum
15:30 CEST (UTC+2)	Stafylidis (yellow card) 13'; Stöger 39'; Ganvoula (yellow card) 90+3'	Report	Onisiwo 26', 77'; Stach (yellow card) 33'; Bell (yellow card) 64'; Burgzorg (yellow card) 84'	Stadium: Vonovia Ruhrstadion; Attendance: 24,110; Referee: Felix Zwayer

13 August 2022 2	1899 Hoffenheim	3–2	VfL Bochum	Sinsheim
15:30 CEST (UTC+2)	Baumgartner 14'; Kabak 23'; Kramarić (penalty missed) 59'; Akpoguma (yellow card) 67'; Dabbur 88'	Report	Zoller 10', 13'; Losilla (yellow card) 58'	Stadium: Rhein-Neckar-Arena; Attendance: 17,005; Referee: Patrick Ittrich

21 August 2022 3	VfL Bochum	0–7	Bayern Munich	Bochum
17:30 CEST (UTC+2)	Janko (yellow card) 46'	Report	Sané 4'; de Ligt 25'; Coman 33'; Mané 42', 60' (pen.); Gamboa 69' (o.g.); Gnabry 76'	Stadium: Vonovia Ruhrstadion; Attendance: 26,000; Referee: Daniel Siebert

26 August 2022 4	SC Freiburg	1–0	VfL Bochum	Freiburg
20:30 CEST (UTC+2)	Grifo (penalty missed) 48', 48'; Sallai (yellow card) 77'; Höfler (yellow card) 83'	Report	Stafylidis (yellow card) 42'; Riemann (yellow card) 48'	Stadium: Europa-Park Stadion; Attendance: 32,800; Referee: Marco Fritz

3 September 2022 5	VfL Bochum	0–2	Werder Bremen	Bochum
15:30 CEST (UTC+2)	Weiser (yellow card) 33'; Pieper (yellow card) 69'	Report	Zoller (yellow card) 39'; Füllkrug 86', 90+2' (pen.); Lampropoulos (yellow card) 90'	Stadium: Vonovia Ruhrstadion; Attendance: 25,800; Referee: Robert Schröder

10 September 2022 6	Schalke 04	3–1	VfL Bochum	Gelsenkirchen
15:30 CEST (UTC+2)	Drexler 38'; Mašović 73' (o.g.); Schwolow (yellow card) 85'; Flick (yellow card) 86'; Polter 90+6'	Report	Zoller (yellow card) 9'; Losilla (yellow card) 29'; Hofmann 51'; Soares (yellow card) 82'	Stadium: Veltins-Arena; Attendance: 62,041; Referee: Felix Zwayer

18 September 2022 7	VfL Bochum	1–1	1. FC Köln	Bochum
17:30 CEST (UTC+2)	Schmitz 9' (o.g.)	Report	Hübers (yellow card) 68'; Maina 88'	Stadium: Vonovia Ruhrstadion; Attendance: 25,800; Referee: Bastian Dankert

1 October 2022 8	RB Leipzig	4–0	VfL Bochum	Leipzig
15:30 CEST (UTC+2)	Werner 15', 53'; Nkunku 23' (pen.), 85', (penalty missed) 64'	Report	Soares (yellow card) 23'; Horn (yellow card) 22'	Stadium: Red Bull Arena; Attendance: 44,403; Referee: Florian Badstübner

8 October 2022 9	VfL Bochum	3–0	Eintracht Frankfurt	Bochum
15:30 CEST (UTC+2)	Zoller (yellow card) 40'; Ordets (yellow card) 54'; Hofmann 71'; Ndicka 87' (o.g.); Förster 90+1'	Report	Dina Ebimbe (yellow card) 57'	Stadium: Vonovia Ruhrstadion; Attendance: 24,850; Referee: Martin Petersen

15 October 2022 10	VfB Stuttgart	4–1	VfL Bochum	Stuttgart
15:30 CEST (UTC+2)	Silas 3' (pen.), 64'; Ahamada 22'; Endo 71'	Report	Förster (yellow card) 16'; Zoller 29'; Gamboa (yellow card) 71'; Stöger (yellow card) 72'	Stadium: Mercedes-Benz Arena; Attendance: 45,400; Referee: Christian Dingert

23 October 2022 11	VfL Bochum	2–1	Union Berlin	Bochum
15:30 CEST (UTC+2)	Ordets (yellow card) 17'; Hofmann 43'; Holtmann 71'	Report	Jaeckel (yellow card) 35'; Ryerson (yellow card) 70'; Pantović (penalty missed) 78', 90+3'; Skarke (yellow card) 78'	Stadium: Vonovia Ruhrstadion; Attendance: 25,460; Referee: Deniz Aytekin

29 October 2022 12	VfL Wolfsburg	4–0	VfL Bochum	Wolfsburg
15:30 CEST (UTC+2)	Bornauw (yellow card) 24'; F. Nmecha 27', 58'; Baku 35'; Wind 80'	Report	Heintz (yellow card) 57'	Stadium: Volkswagen Arena; Attendance: 24,037; Referee: Robert Hartmann

5 November 2022 13	Borussia Dortmund	3–0	VfL Bochum	Dortmund
15:30 CET (UTC+1)	Moukoko 8', 45+2'; Reyna 12' (pen.); Özcan (yellow card) 79'	Report	Gamboa (yellow card) 54'	Stadium: Signal Iduna Park; Attendance: 81,365; Referee: Tobias Stieler

8 November 2022 14	VfL Bochum	2–1	Borussia Mönchengladbach	Bochum
20:30 CEST (UTC+2)	Hofmann 7'; Antwi-Adjei 12'; Losilla (yellow card) 78'	Report	Friedrich (yellow card) 2'; Pléa (yellow card) 44' (goal) 62'; Kramer (yellow card) 55'	Stadium: Vonovia Ruhrstadion; Attendance: 25,900; Referee: Daniel Schlager

12 November 2022 15	FC Augsburg	0–1	VfL Bochum	Augsburg
15:30 CET (UTC+1)	Berisha (penalty missed) 61', (yellow card) 90+1'	Report	Antwi-Adjei 58'; Osei-Tutu (yellow card) 90+1'	Stadium: WWK Arena; Attendance: 28,011; Referee: Felix Brych

21 January 2023 16	VfL Bochum	3–1	Hertha BSC	Bochum
15:30 CET (UTC+1)	Hofmann 22', 56'; Soares (yellow card) 41'; Schlotterbeck 44'	Report	Kempf (yellow card) 39'; Serdar 87'	Stadium: Vonovia Ruhrstadion; Attendance: 26,000; Referee: Martin Petersen

25 January 2023 17	Bayer Leverkusen	2–0	VfL Bochum	Leverkusen
20:30 CET (UTC+1)	Tapsoba 8' (pen.); Diaby (yellow card) 39'; Andrich (yellow card) 45'; Hložek 53'	Report	Soares (yellow card) 51'; Mašović (yellow card) 61'; Osei-Tutu (yellow card) 71'; Lampropoulos (yellow card) 81'	Stadium: BayArena; Attendance: 25,820; Referee: Timo Gerach

28 January 2023 18	Mainz 05	5–2	VfL Bochum	Mainz
15:30 CET (UTC+1)	Lee Jae-sung 1'; Widmer 17'; Onisiwo 28', 57', 87'	Report	Kunde 70'; Mašović 72'; Schlotterbeck (yellow card) 81'	Stadium: Mewa Arena; Attendance: 23,300; Referee: Patrick Ittrich

4 February 2023 19	VfL Bochum	5–2	1899 Hoffenheim	Bochum
15:30 CET (UTC+1)	Hofmann 22', (yellow card) 54'; Förster 30', (yellow card) 59'; Asano 40'; Mašović 69'; Broschinski 83'	Report	Baumgartner 49', (yellow card) 56'; Rudy (yellow card) 56'; Dabbur 77', (yellow card) 90'	Stadium: Vonovia Ruhrstadion; Attendance: 23,700; Referee: Bastian Dankert

11 February 2023 20	Bayern Munich	3–0	VfL Bochum	Munich
15:30 CET (UTC+1)	Müller 41'; Coman 64'; Gnabry 74' (pen.); Tel (yellow card) 79'	Report	Ordets (yellow card) 89'	Stadium: Allianz Arena; Attendance: 75,000; Referee: Matthias Jöllenbeck

18 February 2023 21	VfL Bochum	0–2	SC Freiburg	Bochum
15:30 CET (UTC+1)	Zoller (yellow card) 34'; Losilla (red card) 63'; Broschinski (yellow card) 79'; Osei-Tutu (yellow card) 90+5'	Report	Gregoritsch 39'; Lienhart (yellow card) 43'; Höler 51'; Günter (yellow card) 62'; Schlotterbeck (yellow card) 76'	Stadium: Vonovia Ruhrstadion; Attendance: 25,100; Referee: Felix Zwayer

25 February 2023 22	Werder Bremen	3–0	VfL Bochum	Bremen
15:30 CET (UTC+1)	Füllkrug 29'; Schmidt 43'; Friedl (yellow card) 45+1'; Pieper (yellow card) 47'; Ducksch 59'; Jung (yellow card) 80'	Report	Schlotterbeck (yellow card) 45+1'; Hofmann (yellow card) 51'	Stadium: Wohninvest Weserstadion; Attendance: 42,100; Referee: Florian Badstübner

4 March 2023 23	VfL Bochum	0–2	Schalke 04	Bochum
15:30 CET (UTC+1)	Osterhage (yellow card) 59'; Förster (yellow card) 85'	Report	Krauß (yellow card) 51'; Riemann 45' (o.g.); Bülter 79'	Stadium: Vonovia Ruhrstadion; Attendance: 26,000; Referee: Felix Brych

10 March 2023 24	1. FC Köln	0–2	VfL Bochum	Cologne
20:30 CET (UTC+1)	Hector (yellow card) 66'; Schmitz (yellow card) 82'	Report	Stöger 9' (pen.); Hofmann (yellow card) 29'; Asano (yellow card) 49'; Mašović 76'	Stadium: RheinEnergieStadion; Attendance: 50,000; Referee: Tobias Welz

18 March 2023 25	VfL Bochum	1–0	RB Leipzig	Bochum
15:30 CET (UTC+1)	Mašović (yellow card) 14', (goal) 48'; Soares (yellow card) 44'	Report	Laimer (yellow card) 11'; Olmo (yellow card) 75'; Kampl (yellow card) 86'	Stadium: Vonovia Ruhrstadion; Attendance: 24,400; Referee: Sascha Stegemann

31 March 2023 26	Eintracht Frankfurt	1–1	VfL Bochum	Frankfurt
20:30 CEST (UTC+2)	Sow (yellow card) 4'; Kolo Muani 22' (pen.); Borré (yellow card) 71'; Jakić (yellow card) 81'	Report	Losilla (yellow card) 6'; Asano 14'; Ordets (yellow card) 21'	Stadium: Deutsche Bank Park; Attendance: 51,500; Referee: Harm Osmers

9 April 2023 27	VfL Bochum	2–3	VfB Stuttgart	Bochum
17:30 CEST (UTC+2)	Antwi-Adjei (yellow card) 36'; Stöger 58' (pen.); Hofmann 85'; Losilla (yellow card) 90+5'; Riemann (yellow card) 90+7'	Report	Ito 14'; Guirassy (yellow card) 37', (goal) 60'; Vagnoman 63'; Mavropanos (yellow card) 90+5'; Bredlow (yellow card) 90+7'	Stadium: Vonovia Ruhrstadion; Attendance: 26,000; Referee: Frank Willenborg

16 April 2023 28	Union Berlin	1–1	VfL Bochum	Berlin
17:30 CEST (UTC+2)	Juranović 45+2'; Jaeckel (yellow card) 50' (yellow-red card) 61'	Report	Osterhage (yellow card) 28'; Stöger 55' (pen.)	Stadium: Stadion An der Alten Försterei; Attendance: 20,000; Referee: Tobias Stieler

22 April 2023 29	VfL Bochum	1–5	VfL Wolfsburg	Bochum
15:30 CEST (UTC+2)	Stöger (yellow card) 21'; Mašović (yellow card) 31'; Antwi-Adjei (yellow card) 37'; Broschinski 69'	Report	Svanberg 10', 56'; Kamiński 21'; Wimmer (yellow card) 24', (goal) 33'; Wind (penalty missed) 77'; Waldschmidt 77'; Guilavogui (yellow card) 80'; Van de Ven (yellow card) 84'	Stadium: Vonovia Ruhrstadion; Attendance: 24,834; Referee: Felix Brych

28 April 2023 30	VfL Bochum	1–1	Borussia Dortmund	Bochum
20:30 CEST (UTC+2)	Losilla 5'; Soares (yellow card) 30'	Report	Adeyemi 7', (yellow card) 43'; Haller (yellow card) 43'	Stadium: Vonovia Ruhrstadion; Attendance: 26,000; Referee: Sascha Stegemann

6 May 2023 31	Borussia Mönchengladbach	2–0	VfL Bochum	Mönchengladbach
15:30 CEST (UTC+2)	Hofmann 35'; Pléa (yellow card) 57'; Stindl 90+1'	Report	Hofmann (yellow card) 41'; Stafylidis (yellow card) 85'	Stadium: Borussia-Park; Attendance: 53,797; Referee: Robert Schröder

13 May 2023 32	VfL Bochum	3–2	FC Augsburg	Bochum
15:30 CEST (UTC+2)	Antwi-Adjei 2'; Stafylidis (yellow card) 4'; Hofmann (yellow card) 50'; Gouweleeuw 59' (o.g.); Losilla 62'; Riemann (yellow card) 90+3'	Report	Meier 29'; Bauer (yellow card) 32'; Gumny (yellow card) 76'; Yeboah 85'	Stadium: Vonovia Ruhrstadion; Attendance: 24,453; Referee: Patrick Ittrich

20 May 2023 33	Hertha BSC	1–1	VfL Bochum	Berlin
15:30 CEST (UTC+2)	Tousart 63'; Mittelstädt (yellow card) 82'	Report	Losilla (yellow card) 37'; Schlotterbeck 90+4'	Stadium: Olympiastadion; Attendance: 70,692; Referee: Felix Brych

27 May 2023 34	VfL Bochum	3–0	Bayer Leverkusen	Bochum
15:30 CEST (UTC+2)	Förster 19', (yellow card) 28'; Stöger (yellow card) 21', (goal) 86'; Asano 34'; Hofmann (yellow card) 73'; Osterhage (yellow card) 84'; Zoller (yellow card) 89'	Report	Adli (red card) 8'; Tapsoba (yellow card) 63'; Wirtz (yellow card) 66'; Bakker (yellow card) 69'; Diaby (yellow card) 71'; Palacios (yellow card) 89'	Stadium: Vonovia Ruhrstadion; Attendance: 26,000; Referee: Tobias Welz

=== DFB-Pokal ===
30 July 2022 First round	Viktoria Berlin	0–3	VfL Bochum	Berlin
13:01 CEST (UTC+2)	Inaler (yellow card) 67'; Günay (yellow card) 85'	Report	Lampropoulos (yellow card) 12'; Zoller 18'; Asano 22'; Hofmann 65'; Förster (yellow card) 66'	Stadium: Friedrich-Ludwig-Jahn-Sportpark; Attendance: 5,573; Referee: Patrick Alt

18 October 2022 Second round	SV Elversberg	0–1	VfL Bochum	Spiesen-Elversberg
20:45 CEST (UTC+2)	Rochelt (yellow card) 55'; Tekerci (yellow card) 84'; Jacobsen (yellow card) 87'	Report	Antwi-Adjei (yellow card) 29'; Gamboa (yellow card) 43'; Losilla 85'	Stadium: Waldstadion an der Kaiserlinde; Attendance: 6,911; Referee: Sven Waschitzki-Günther

8 February 2023 Round of 16	VfL Bochum	1–2	Borussia Dortmund	Bochum
20:45 CET (UTC+1)	Janko (yellow card) 39'; Stöger (yellow card) 44', (goal) 64' (pen.); Antwi-Adjei (yellow card) 76'; Riemann (yellow card) 90+7'	Report	Can 45'; Reus 70'	Stadium: Vonovia Ruhrstadion; Attendance: 26,000; Referee: Tobias Stieler

== Statistics ==
=== Appearances and goals ===
No.	Pos	Nat	Player	Total		Bundesliga		DFB-Pokal	
No.	Pos	Nat	Player	Apps	Goals	Apps	Goals	Apps	Goals
Goalkeepers
1	GK	(Germany) GER	Manuel Riemann	27	0	24	0	3	0
21	GK	(Germany) GER	Michael Esser	0	0	0	0	0	0
26	GK	(Sweden) SWE	Marko Johansson	0	0	0	0	0	0
34	GK	(Germany) GER	Paul Grave	0	0	0	0	0	0
Defenders
2	DF	(Costa Rica) CRC	Cristian Gamboa	17	0	15	0	2	0
3	DF	(Brazil) BRA	Danilo Soares	19	0	17	0	2	0
4	DF	(Serbia) SRB	Erhan Mašović	22	3	13+6	3	2+1	0
16	DF	(Greece) GRE	Kostas Stafylidis	13	0	7+6	0	0	0
18	DF	(England) ENG	Jordi Osei-Tutu	20	0	6+12	0	0+2	0
20	DF	(Ukraine) UKR	Ivan Ordets	23	0	18+2	0	3	0
23	DF	(The Gambia) GAM	Saidy Janko	18	0	9+6	0	1+2	0
24	DF	(Greece) GRE	Vasilios Lampropoulos	12	0	7+4	0	1	0
25	DF	(Germany) GER	Mohammed Tolba	0	0	0	0	0	0
30	DF	(Germany) GER	Dominique Heintz	6	0	4+1	0	0+1	0
31	DF	(Germany) GER	Keven Schlotterbeck	7	1	6+1	1	0	0
Midfielders
5	MF	(Poland) POL	Jacek Góralski	4	0	2+2	0	0	0
6	MF	(Germany) GER	Patrick Osterhage	18	0	5+11	0	0+2	0
7	MF	(Austria) AUT	Kevin Stöger	27	3	22+2	2	3	1
8	MF	(France) FRA	Anthony Losilla	24	1	21	0	3	1
10	MF	(Germany) GER	Philipp Förster	22	2	12+7	2	2+1	0
22	MF	(Ghana) GHA	Christopher Antwi-Adjei	21	2	12+7	2	2	0
28	MF	(Cameroon) CMR	Pierre Kunde	8	1	3+4	1	0+1	0
Forwards
9	FW	(Germany) GER	Simon Zoller	20	4	17+2	3	1	1
11	FW	(Japan) JPN	Takuma Asano	17	2	12+3	1	2	1
17	FW	(Philippines) PHI	Gerrit Holtmann	20	1	8+9	1	2+1	0
29	FW	(Germany) GER	Moritz Broschinski	6	1	0+5	1	0+1	0
33	FW	(Germany) GER	Philipp Hofmann	27	8	21+3	7	3	1
35	FW	(Republic of the Congo) CGO	Silvère Ganvoula	15	0	0+15	0	0	0
Players transferred out during the season
14	DF	(Germany) GER	Tim Oermann	4	0	2+2	0	0	0
32	FW	(Germany) GER	Tarsis Bonga	0	0	0	0	0	0
38	DF	(Germany) GER	Jannes Horn	3	0	1+1	0	1	0
39	FW	(France) FRA	Lys Mousset	0	0	0	0	0	0

Last updated: 10 March 2023
Source: Competitions

=== Goalscorers ===
As of 10 March 2023

Rank	No.	Pos.	Nat.	Player	Bundesliga	DFB-Pokal	Total
1	33	FW	(Germany)	Philipp Hofmann	7	1	8
2	9	FW	(Germany)	Simon Zoller	3	1	4
3	4	DF	(Serbia)	Erhan Mašović	3	0	3
3	7	MF	(Austria)	Kevin Stöger	2	1	3
5	10	MF	(Germany)	Philipp Förster	2	0	2
5	11	FW	(Japan)	Takuma Asano	1	1	2
5	22	MF	(Ghana)	Christopher Antwi-Adjei	2	0	2
8	8	MF	(France)	Anthony Losilla	0	1	1
8	17	FW	(Philippines)	Gerrit Holtmann	1	0	1
8	28	MF	(Cameroon)	Pierre Kunde	1	0	1
8	29	FW	(Germany)	Moritz Broschinski	1	0	1
8	31	DF	(Germany)	Keven Schlotterbeck	1	0	1
Own goals					2	0	2
Totals					26	5	31
