= Cristian Gamboa =

Costa Rican footballer (born 1989)

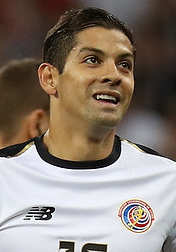
- Gamboa with Costa Rica at the 2018 FIFA World Cup

Personal information
- Full name: Cristian Esteban Gamboa Luna
- Date of birth: 24 October 1989 (age 37)
- Place of birth: Liberia, Costa Rica
- Height: 1.75 m (5 ft 9 in)
- Position: Right-back

Senior career*
Years	Team	Apps	(Gls)
2006–2010	Municipal Liberia	68	(0)
2010–2011	Fredrikstad	27	(1)
2011–2012	Copenhagen	0	(0)
2012	→ Rosenborg (loan)	10	(0)
2013–2014	Rosenborg	30	(0)
2014–2016	West Bromwich Albion	11	(0)
2016–2019	Celtic	20	(0)
2019–2025	VfL Bochum	131	(3)
Total		297	(4)

International career
2010–2020	Costa Rica	78	(3)
- * Club domestic league appearances and goals

Cristian Esteban Gamboa Luna (born 24 October 1989) is a Costa Rican former professional footballer who played as a right-back.

Gamboa was an international player for Costa Rica and represented the national team at the 2014 FIFA World Cup, 2015 CONCACAF Gold Cup, 2016 Copa América, 2017 CONCACAF Gold Cup, 2018 FIFA World Cup, and the 2019 CONCACAF Gold Cup.

== Club career ==
Gamboa was born in Liberia, Costa Rica. At age 15, he was deemed not good enough to play for Costa Rican clubs Saprissa and Alajuelense. He played from the 2006–2007 season for hometown club Municipal Liberia. He then moved abroad and joined Norwegian side Fredrikstad in summer 2010 and played there for two half seasons, before he joined Copenhagen in summer 2011. He made his debut in a 0–1 loss against Standard Liège in the UEFA Europa League.

Gamboa joined Rosenborg on a three-month-loan deal in August 2012 with the Norwegian club having an option to buy. He made his debut on 3 September 2012 in a Tippeligaen match away at Stabæk, winning 2–0. By November he had impressed sufficiently in the ten games he played in for Rosenborg for them to offer him a permanent deal, and he signed five-year contract with the club.

In late July 2014, English Premier League club West Bromwich Albion agreed to sign Gamboa for a fee estimated in the media as around £2 million. Because the player had insufficient recent international appearances for a work permit to be granted automatically, completion of the deal was dependent on a successful appeal to the Football Association, which was confirmed on 5 August. The player signed a three-year contract.

He made his debut on 26 August 2014, coming on as a second-half substitute in a League cup tie against Oxford United. He made his League debut a few days later against Swansea City, after which further substitute appearances followed. Gamboa finally made a starting appearance on 4 October in a 2–1 loss away at Liverpool in the league. Despite the defeat, he was reported as having turned in an impressive performance. It was however to be Gamboa's only league start that season, and he fell further out of favour when manager Alan Irvine was sacked in December and replaced by Tony Pulis. From January 2015 onwards to the end of the season, Gamboa only played one minute of first team football, coming on as an injury-time substitute in a fifth round FA Cup tie against West Ham in February 2015.

Gamboa continued to struggle to hold down a first team place in his second season in England, playing only two games early on in the season. He then went five months without a first team appearance, before making a return to the side in February 2016 in an FA Cup fourth round replay tie against Peterborough United.

On 30 August 2016, Gamboa signed for Scottish Premiership club Celtic on a three-year deal. He was a part of the club's 2016–17 invincible season.

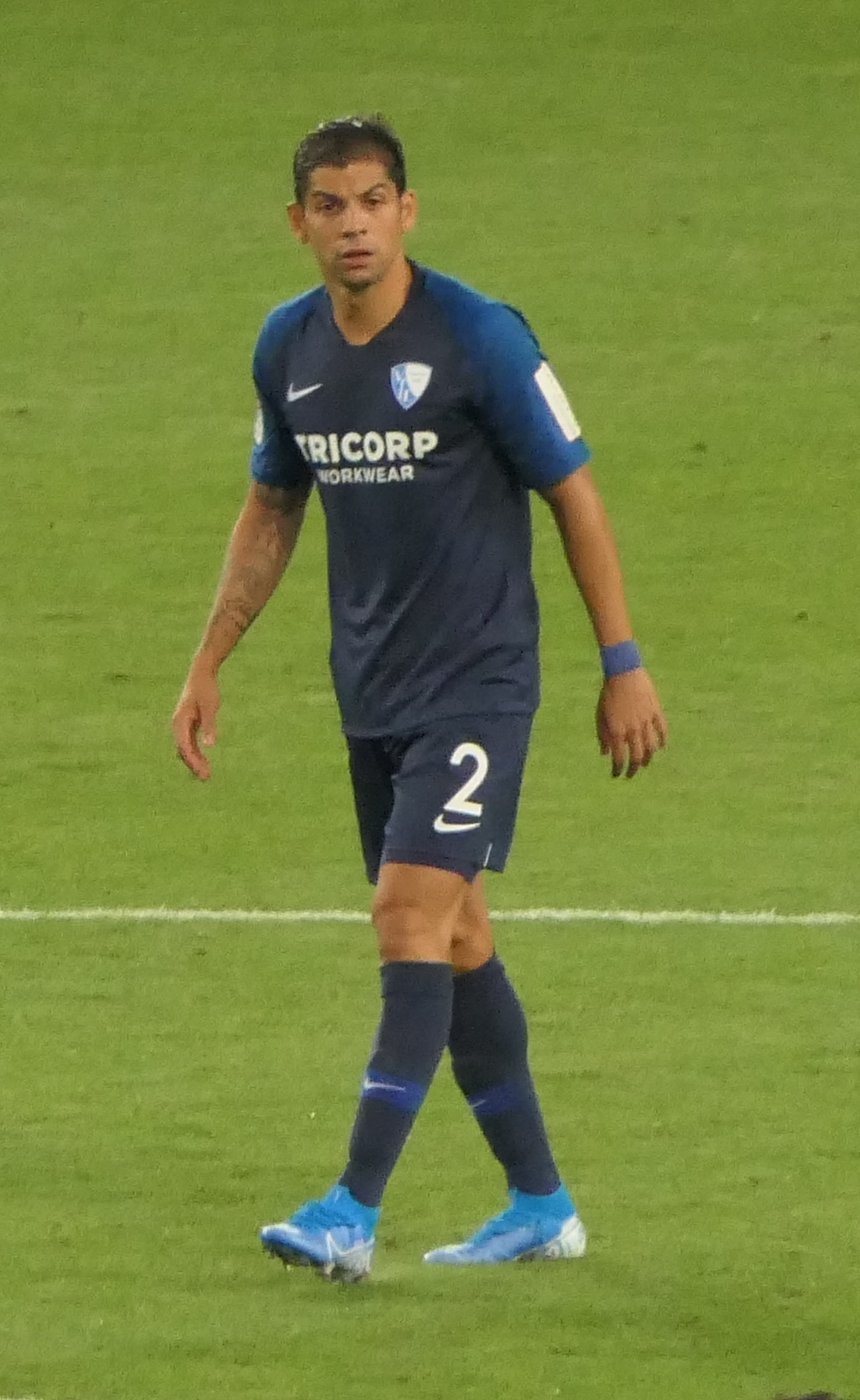
Gamboa with VfL Bochum in 2019

On 27 August 2019, Gamboa joined VfL Bochum on a two-year deal. On 12 February 2022, he scored once in a 4–2 win against Bayern Munich.

On 8 May 2025, Bochum announced that Gamboa and teammate Anthony Losilla would leave the club at the end of the season. Following his departure from the club, Gamboa retired from professional football after a 19-year career, making a total of over 370 appearances for club and country.

== International career ==
He participated in the 2009 FIFA U-20 World Cup for Costa Rica where they finished in fourth place. He has represented Costa Rica in other international games.

He made his debut for the Costa Rica national football team in January 2010, in a friendly match against Argentina. Gamboa scored his first goal in a 7–0 home win against Guyana in a 2014 World Cup qualifier. He was selected for the Costa Rica national team against part at the 2014 FIFA World Cup, and played in all five games, reaching the quarter-final where they were eventually knocked out on penalty kicks by the Netherlands.

In May 2018, he was selected in Costa Rica's 23-man squad for the 2018 FIFA World Cup in Russia.

== Personal life ==
Gamboa is married to Melissa Salazar and they have three children.

== Career statistics ==
=== Club ===
As of match played 10 May 2025

Appearances and goals by club, season and competition
Club	Season	League			National cup		League cup		Europe		Other		Total	
Club	Season	Division	Apps	Goals	Apps	Goals	Apps	Goals	Apps	Goals	Apps	Goals	Apps	Goals
Municipal Liberia	2006-07	Primera División	16	0	0	0	–		–		–		16	0
Municipal Liberia	2007-08	Primera División	26	0	0	0	–		–		–		26	0
Municipal Liberia	2008-09	Primera División	13	0	0	0	–		–		–		13	0
Municipal Liberia	2009-10	Primera División	13	0	0	0	–		–		–		13	0
Municipal Liberia	Total		68	0	0	0	0	0	0	0	0	0	68	0
Fredrikstad	2010	Adeccoligaen	11	1	0	0	–	–	–		3	0	14	1
Fredrikstad	2011	Tippeligaen	16	0	1	0	–	–	–		–		17	0
Fredrikstad	Total		27	1	1	0	0	0	0	0	3	0	31	1
Copenhagen	2011–12	Superliga	0	0	1	0	–		0	0	–		1	0
Copenhagen	2012–13	Superliga	0	0	0	0	0	0	0	0	0	0	0	0
Copenhagen	Total		0	0	1	0	0	0	0	0	0	0	1	0
Rosenborg	2012	Tippeligaen	10	0	0	0	–		6	0	–		16	0
Rosenborg	2013	Tippeligaen	28	0	2	0	–		4	0	–		34	0
Rosenborg	2014	Tippeligaen	2	0	0	0	–		0	0	–		2	0
Rosenborg	Total		40	0	2	0	0	0	10	0	0	0	52	0
West Bromwich Albion	2014–15	Premier League	10	0	1	0	3	0	–		–		14	0
West Bromwich Albion	2015–16	Premier League	1	0	1	0	1	0	–		–		3	0
West Bromwich Albion	Total		11	0	2	0	4	0	0	0	0	0	17	0
Celtic	2016–17	Scottish Premiership	17	0	1	0	1	0	2	0	–		21	0
Celtic	2017–18	Scottish Premiership	2	0	0	0	0	0	1	0	–		3	0
Celtic	2018–19	Scottish Premiership	1	0	0	0	1	0	5	0	–		7	0
Celtic	Total		20	0	1	0	2	0	8	0	0	0	31	0
VfL Bochum	2019–20	2. Bundesliga	26	1	0	0	0	0	0	0	–		26	1
VfL Bochum	2020–21	2. Bundesliga	29	0	3	0	–		–		–		32	0
VfL Bochum	2021–22	Bundesliga	23	1	4	0	–		–		–		27	1
VfL Bochum	2022–23	Bundesliga	19	0	2	0	–		–		–		21	0
VfL Bochum	2023–24	Bundesliga	22	0	1	0	–		–		0	0	23	0
VfL Bochum	2024–25	Bundesliga	11	1	0	0	–		–		0	0	11	1
VfL Bochum	Total		130	3	10	0	–		–		0	0	140	3
Career Total			296	4	17	0	6	0	18	0	3	0	340	4

=== International ===
Appearances and goals by national team and year
National team	Year	Apps	Goals
Costa Rica	2010	4	0
Costa Rica	2011	4	0
Costa Rica	2012	3	1
Costa Rica	2013	11	0
Costa Rica	2014	10	0
Costa Rica	2015	12	1
Costa Rica	2016	7	1
Costa Rica	2017	11	0
Costa Rica	2018	11	0
Costa Rica	2019	4	0
Costa Rica	2020	1	0
Total		78	3

Scores and results list Costa Rica's goal tally first, score column indicates score after each Gamboa goal.

List of international goals scored by Cristian Gamboa
No.	Date	Venue	Opponent	Score	Result	Competition
1	16 October 2012	Estadio Nacional de Costa Rica, San José	Guyana	2–0	7–0	2014 World Cup qualifier
2	13 November 2015	Estadio Nacional de Costa Rica, San José	Haiti	1–0	1–0	2018 World Cup qualifier
3	28 May 2016	Estadio Nacional de Costa Rica, San José	Venezuela	2–1	2–1	Friendly

== Honours ==
Municipal Liberia

- Costa Rican Primera División: Clausura 2009

Copenhagen

- Danish Cup: 2011–12

Celtic

- Scottish Premiership: 2016–17, 2017–18
- Scottish League Cup: 2016–17, 2018–19
- Scottish Cup: 2016–17

VfL Bochum

- 2. Bundesliga: 2020–21

Costa Rica

- CONCACAF Gold Cup: Bronze-medal 2017
- Copa Centroamericana: Runner-up 2011
- FIFA U-20 World Cup: Fourth-place 2009
- CONCACAF U-20 Championship: 2009

Individual

- CONCACAF Best XI: 2017
