= Tim Oermann =

German footballer (born 2003)

Personal information
- Date of birth: 6 October 2003 (age 23)
- Place of birth: Bochum, Germany
- Height: 1.89 m (6 ft 2 in)
- Position: Defender

Team information
- Current team: Bayer Leverkusen
- Number: 15

Youth career
- 2008–2012: FC Altenbochum
- 2012–2022: VfL Bochum

Senior career*
Years	Team	Apps	(Gls)
2022–2025	VfL Bochum	49	(0)
2023	→ Wolfsberger AC (loan)	15	(0)
2025–	Bayer Leverkusen	2	(0)
2025–2026	→ Sturm Graz (loan)	13	(0)

International career^{‡}
2023	Germany U20	7	(0)
2024–2025	Germany U21	10	(0)
Medal record
Men's football
Representing Germany
UEFA European Under-21 Championship
Runner-up	2025 Slovakia
- * Club domestic league appearances and goals as of 17:31, 21 March 2026 (UTC) ‡ National team caps and goals as of 10:11, 29 June 2025 (UTC)

Tim Oermann (German pronunciation: [tɪm ˈøːɐ̯man]; born 6 October 2003) is a German professional footballer who plays as a defender for Bundesliga club Bayer Leverkusen.

== Club career ==
A youth product of FC Altenbochum and VfL Bochum, Oermann signed his first professional contract with Bochum on 17 June 2022 until 30 June 2024. He made his senior and professional debut with Bochum in a 1–1 Bundesliga tie with 1. FC Köln on 18 September 2022. On 23 December 2022, he extended his contract with the club until 2026. On 24 January 2023, he joined Wolfsberger AC on loan for the second half of the 2022–23 season in the Austrian Bundesliga.

On 29 May 2025, Oermann signed a contract with Bayer Leverkusen until 2029, and was directly loaned out to Austrian Bundesliga side Sturm Graz for the 2025–26 season.

== International career ==
Oermann is a youth international for Germany, having been called up to the Germany U20s in March 2023.

== Career statistics ==
As of match played 21 March 2026

Appearances and goals by club, season and competition
Club	Season	League			National cup (Note: Includes DFB-Pokal, Austrian Cup)		Continental		Other		Total	
Club	Season	Division	Apps	Goals	Apps	Goals	Apps	Goals	Apps	Goals	Apps	Goals
VfL Bochum	2022–23	Bundesliga	4	0	0	0	—		—		4	0
VfL Bochum	2023–24	Bundesliga	16	0	0	0	—		1 (Note: Appearance in relegation play-offs)	0	17	0
VfL Bochum	2024–25	Bundesliga	29	0	1	0	—		—		30	0
VfL Bochum	Total		49	0	1	0	—		1	0	51	0
Wolfsberger AC (loan)	2022–23	Austrian Bundesliga	15	0	1	0	—		—		16	0
Bayer Leverkusen	2025–26	Bundesliga	2	0	—		0	0	—		2	0
Sturm Graz (loan)	2025–26	Austrian Bundesliga	13	0	4	0	7 (Note: Two appearances and one goal in UEFA Champions League, five appearances in UEFA Europa League)	1	—		24	1
Career total			79	0	6	0	7	1	1	0	93	1

== Honours ==
Germany U21

- UEFA European Under-21 Championship runner-up: 2025
