= Christopher Antwi-Adjei =

Ghanaian footballer

Personal information
- Date of birth: 7 February 1994 (age 32)
- Place of birth: Hagen, Germany
- Height: 1.74 m (5 ft 9 in)
- Positions: Left winger; left midfielder

Youth career
- 1999–2001: Fortuna Hagen
- 2001–2009: Hasper SV
- 2009–2011: MSV Duisburg
- 2011–2012: TSC Eintracht Dortmund
- 2012–2013: Westfalia Herne

Senior career*
Years	Team	Apps	(Gls)
2013–2014	Westfalia Herne	31	(4)
2014–2017	TSG Sprockhövel	89	(24)
2017–2021	SC Paderborn	132	(23)
2021–2024	VfL Bochum	79	(6)
2024–2026	Schalke 04	34	(2)

International career
2019–2022	Ghana	3	(0)
- * Club domestic league appearances and goals as of 30 June 2026

Christopher Antwi-Adjei (born 7 February 1994) is a professional footballer who plays as a left winger or left midfielder.. Born in Germany, he has represented the Ghana national team.

== Club career ==
In May 2021, VfL Bochum, newly promoted to the Bundesliga, announced the signing of Antwi-Adjei for the 2021–22 season. He signed a contract until 2024 and joined on a free transfer from SC Paderborn.

On 23 August 2024, Schalke 04 announced that they had signed Antwi-Adjei on a free transfer until 30 June 2026.

== International career ==
Antwi-Adjei made his debut for Ghana national team on 18 November 2019 in an AFCON qualifier against São Tomé and Príncipe.

== Career statistics ==
=== Club ===
As of match played 17 May 2026

Appearances and goals by club, season and competition
Club	Season	League			DFB-Pokal		Other		Total	
Club	Season	Division	Apps	Goals	Apps	Goals	Apps	Goals	Apps	Goals
Westfalia Herne	2013–14	Oberliga Westfalen	31	4	—		—		31	4
TSG Sprockhövel	2014–15	Oberliga Westfalen	27	4	—		—		27	4
TSG Sprockhövel	2015–16	Oberliga Westfalen	33	12	—		—		33	12
TSG Sprockhövel	2016–17	Regionalliga West	29	8	—		—		29	8
TSG Sprockhövel	Total		89	24	—		—		89	24
SC Paderborn	2017–18	3. Liga	36	8	4	1	—		40	9
SC Paderborn	2018–19	2. Bundesliga	31	10	4	1	—		35	11
SC Paderborn	2019–20	Bundesliga	34	1	2	1	—		36	2
SC Paderborn	2020–21	2. Bundesliga	31	4	3	0	—		34	4
SC Paderborn	Total		132	23	13	3	—		145	26
VfL Bochum	2021–22	Bundesliga	25	1	3	0	—		28	1
VfL Bochum	2022–23	Bundesliga	29	3	2	0	—		31	3
VfL Bochum	2023–24	Bundesliga	25	2	1	0	1 (Note: Appearance in Bundesliga relegation playoffs)	0	27	2
VfL Bochum	Total		79	6	6	0	1	0	86	6
Schalke 04	2024–25	2. Bundesliga	20	1	0	0	—		20	1
Schalke 04	2025–26	2. Bundesliga	14	1	1	0	—		15	1
Schalke 04	Total		34	2	1	0	—		35	2
Career total			365	59	20	3	1	0	386	62

=== International ===
Appearances and goals by national team and year
National team	Year	Apps	Goals
Ghana	2019	1	0
Ghana	2022	2	0
Total		3	0

== Honours ==
Schalke 04

- 2. Bundesliga: 2025–26
