= Patrick Osterhage =

German footballer

Personal information
- Date of birth: 1 February 2000 (age 26)
- Place of birth: Göttingen, Germany
- Height: 1.86 m (6 ft 1 in)
- Position: Midfielder

Team information
- Current team: SC Freiburg
- Number: 6

Youth career
- 2010–2011: SC Marklohe
- 2011–2017: Werder Bremen
- 2017–2020: Borussia Dortmund

Senior career*
Years	Team	Apps	(Gls)
2020–2021	Borussia Dortmund II	8	(1)
2021–2024	VfL Bochum	60	(2)
2024–	SC Freiburg	52	(2)

International career^{‡}
2018	Germany U18	1	(0)
2019	Germany U19	3	(0)
2022–	Germany U21	4	(0)
- * Club domestic league appearances and goals as of 25 October 2026 ‡ National team caps and goals as of 18:27, 28 March 2023 (UTC)

Patrick Osterhage (born 1 February 2000) is a German professional footballer who plays as a midfielder for Bundesliga club SC Freiburg.

== Club career ==
A youth product of SC Marklohe, Werder Bremen and Borussia Dortmund, Osterhage began his senior career with the reserves of Borussia Dortmund in 2020. On 7 June 2021, he transferred to VfL Bochum. He made his professional debut with Bochum in a 3–0 Bundesliga loss to RB Leipzig on 2 October 2021, coming on as a late sub in the 82nd minute.

On 15 April 2024, SC Freiburg announced the signing of Osterhage from summer 2024.

== International career ==
Osterhage is a youth international for Germany, having represented the Germany U18s and U19s.

== Career statistics ==
As of match played 25 October 2026

Appearances and goals by club, season and competition
Club	Season	League			Cup		Europe		Other		Total	
Club	Season	Division	Apps	Goals	Apps	Goals	Apps	Goals	Apps	Goals	Apps	Goals
Borussia Dortmund II	2020–21	Regionalliga West	8	1	—		—		—		8	1
Bochum	2021–22	Bundesliga	13	0	2	0	—		—		15	0
Bochum	2022–23	Bundesliga	23	0	2	0	—		—		25	0
Bochum	2023–24	Bundesliga	24	2	1	0	—		2 (Note: Appearances in relegation play-offs)	0	27	2
Bochum	Total		60	2	5	0	—		2	0	67	2
SC Freiburg	2024–25	Bundesliga	30	1	3	0	—		—		33	1
SC Freiburg	2025–26	Bundesliga	20	1	2	0	8 (Note: Appearances in UEFA Europa League)	1	—		30	1
SC Freiburg	2026–27	Bundesliga	2	0	1	0	2 (Note: Appearances in UEFA Conference League)	0	—		5	0
SC Freiburg	Total		52	2	6	0	10	1	—		68	2
Career total			120	5	11	0	10	1	2	0	143	6

== Honours ==
SC Freiburg

- UEFA Europa League runner-up: 2025–26
