= Moritz Römling =

German footballer

Personal information
- Date of birth: 30 April 2001 (age 25)
- Place of birth: Witten, Germany
- Height: 1.86 m (6 ft 1 in)
- Position: Left-back

Team information
- Current team: Tatran Prešov
- Number: 33

Youth career
- 2006–2013: SV Herbede
- 2013–2014: FSV Witten
- 2014–2020: VfL Bochum

Senior career*
Years	Team	Apps	(Gls)
2018–2024	VfL Bochum	4	(0)
2021	→ Wuppertaler SV (loan)	18	(1)
2021–2022	→ Türkgücü München (loan)	21	(0)
2022–2023	→ Rot-Weiss Essen (loan)	11	(0)
2024–	Kapfenberger SV	26	(6)
2025–2026	→ Tatran Prešov (loan)	11	(0)

International career^{‡}
2018–2019	Germany U18	4	(0)
- * Club domestic league appearances and goals as of 25 May 2026 ‡ National team caps and goals as of 14 May 2019

Moritz Römling (born 30 April 2001) is a German professional footballer who plays as a left-back for Slovak club Tatran Prešov, on loan from Austrian club Kapfenberger SV.

== Career ==
Römling made his professional debut for VfL Bochum in the 2. Bundesliga on 23 February 2019, starting in the home match against Holstein Kiel before being substituted out in the 61st minute for Simon Zoller, with the match finishing as a 3–1 loss. On 6 January 2021, Römling and his Bochum teammate Lars Holtkamp joined Wuppertaler SV on loan for the remainder of the 2020–21 season. On 15 June 2021, Bochum announced Römling being loaned to Türkgücü Munich for the 2021–22 3. Liga season. For the 2022–23 season, Römling joined Rot-Weiss Essen on loan.

== Career statistics ==
As of match played 25 June 2022.

Appearances and goals by club, season and competition
Club	Season	League			National Cup		Total	
Club	Season	Division	Apps	Goals	Apps	Goals	Apps	Goals
VfL Bochum	2018–19	2. Bundesliga	3	0	0	0	3	0
VfL Bochum	2019–20	2. Bundesliga	0	0	0	0	0	0
VfL Bochum	2020–21	2. Bundesliga	1	0	0	0	1	0
VfL Bochum	2022–23	Bundesliga	0	0	0	0	0	0
VfL Bochum	Total		4	0	0	0	4	0
Wuppertaler SV (loan)	2020–21	Regionalliga West	18	1	—		18	1
Türkgücü Munich (loan)	2021–22	3. Liga	21	0	1	0	22	0
Career total			43	1	1	0	44	1
