= Moritz Broschinski =

German footballer (born 2000)

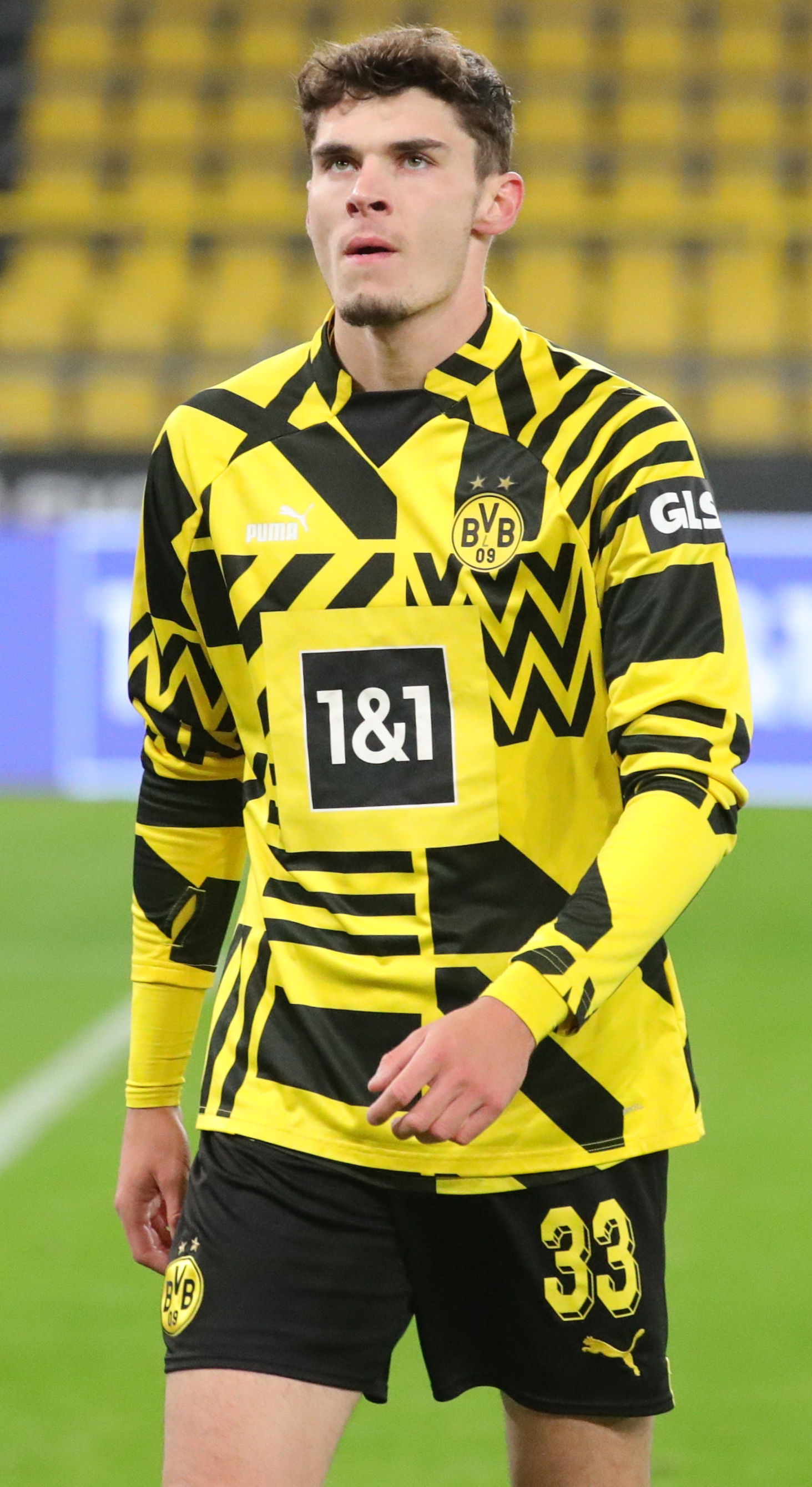
- Broschinski with Borussia Dortmund II in 2022

Personal information
- Date of birth: 23 September 2000 (age 26)
- Place of birth: Finsterwalde, Germany
- Height: 1.90 m (6 ft 3 in)
- Position: Forward

Team information
- Current team: Karlsruher SC (on loan from Basel)
- Number: 9

Youth career
- SV Hertha Finsterwalde
- –2012: Glückauf Brieske-Senftenberg
- 2012–2019: Energie Cottbus

Senior career*
Years	Team	Apps	(Gls)
2018–2020	Energie Cottbus	37	(7)
2020–2023	Borussia Dortmund II	33	(3)
2023–2025	VfL Bochum	72	(6)
2025–	Basel	19	(1)
2026–	→ Karlsruher SC (loan)	0	(0)
- * Club domestic league appearances and goals as of 26 May 2026

Moritz Broschinski (born 23 September 2000) is a German professional footballer who plays as a forward for 2. Bundesliga club Karlsruher SC, on loan from Swiss Super League club Basel.

== Career ==
=== Energie Cottbus ===
Broschinski began his professional career at Energie Cottbus, where he had spent much of his youth career. He made his debut for the first team on 4 February 2018, coming on as a 64th-minute substitute in a 0–0 draw vs. FSV Budissa Bautzen. He scored his first goal later that season, in a 2–1 win over FSV Wacker Nordhausen on 22 April 2018.

The following season, he made 13 appearances in all competitions, scoring once in the Brandenburgpokal.

In the 2019–20 season, Broschinski made 23 league appearances, scoring six goals. He also scored three goals in the 2020-21 Brandenburgpokal.

=== Borussia Dortmund II ===
Ahead of the 2020–21 season, Broschinski joined Borussia Dortmund II. He made his debut on 12 December 2020, coming on as a 83rd-minute substitute vs. VfB Homberg.

=== VfL Bochum ===
On 22 January 2023, Broschinski signed for Bundesliga club VfL Bochum for an undisclosed fee on a three-and-a-half-year deal.

=== Basel ===
On 12 August 2025, Broschinski signed a four-year contract with Basel in Switzerland.

On 2 July 2026, Broschinski joined Karlsruher SC in 2. Bundesliga on loan with an option to buy.

== Career statistics ==
As of match played 18 August 2025

Appearances and goals by club, season and competition
Club	Season	League			Cup		Europe		Other		Total	
Club	Season	Division	Apps	Goals	Apps	Goals	Apps	Goals	Apps	Goals	Apps	Goals
Energie Cottbus	2017–18	Regionalliga Nordost	4	1	—		—		—		4	1
Energie Cottbus	2018–19	3. Liga	10	0	—		—		3 (Note: Appearances in Brandenburg Cup)	1	13	1
Energie Cottbus	2019–20	Regionalliga Nordost	23	6	—		—		4	3	27	9
Energie Cottbus	Total		37	7	—		—		7	4	44	11
Borussia Dortmund II	2020–21	Regionalliga West	8	0	—		—		—		8	0
Borussia Dortmund II	2021–22	3. Liga	10	0	—		—		—		10	0
Borussia Dortmund II	2022–23	3. Liga	15	3	—		—		—		15	3
Borussia Dortmund II	Total		33	3	—		—		—		33	3
VfL Bochum	2022–23	Bundesliga	11	2	1	0	—		—		12	2
VfL Bochum	2023–24	Bundesliga	26	2	1	0	—		1 (Note: Appearances in Relegation Play-Offs)	0	28	2
VfL Bochum	2024–25	Bundesliga	33	1	1	0	—		—		34	1
VfL Bochum	2025–26	2. Bundesliga	2	1	0	0	—		—		2	1
VfL Bochum	Total		72	6	3	0	—		1	0	76	6
Basel	2025–26	Swiss Super League	1	2	0	0	0	0	0	0	1	2
Career total			142	18	3	0	0	0	8	4	153	22
