= Manuel Riemann =

German footballer (born 1988)

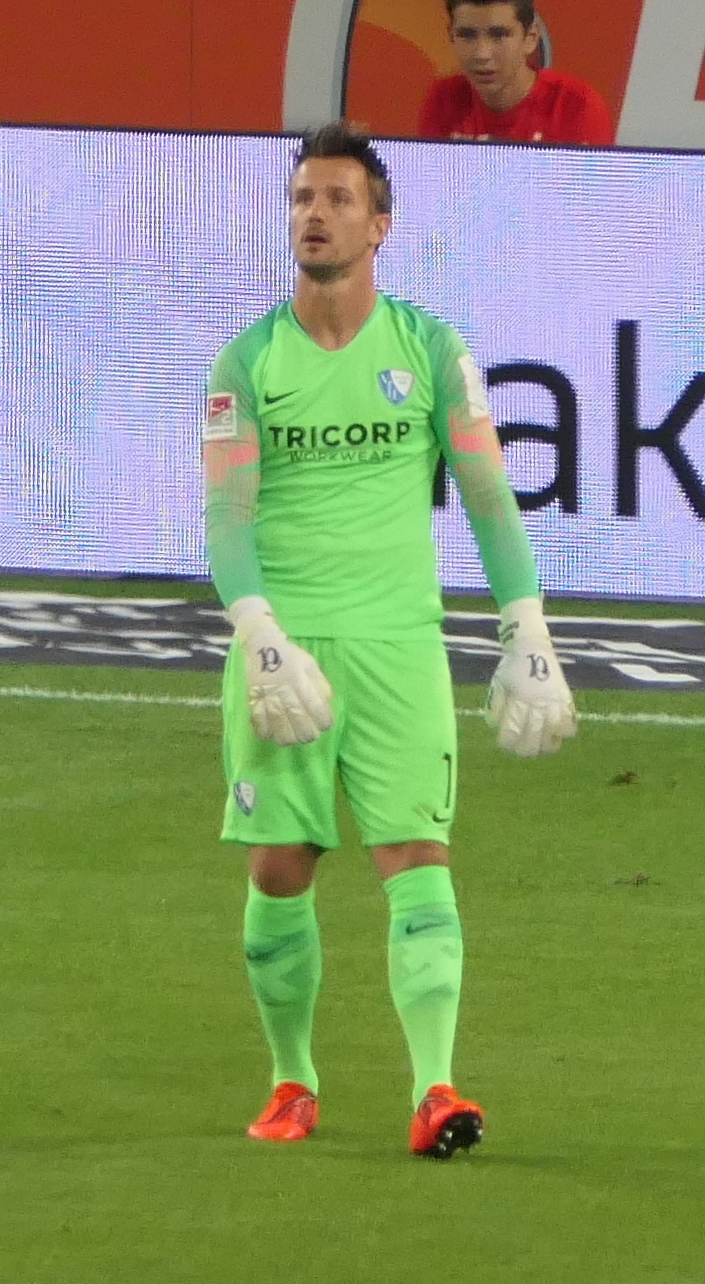
- Riemann with VfL Bochum in 2019

Personal information
- Full name: Manuel Riemann-Lorenzen
- Date of birth: 9 September 1988 (age 38)
- Place of birth: Mühldorf, West Germany
- Height: 1.86 m (6 ft 1 in)
- Position: Goalkeeper

Team information
- Current team: Alemannia Aachen
- Number: 1

Youth career
- TSV Ampfing
- –2003: TSV 1860 Rosenheim
- 2003–2007: Wacker Burghausen

Senior career*
| Years | Team | Apps | (Gls) |
| 2006–2007 | Wacker Burghausen II | 7 | (0) |
| 2007–2010 | Wacker Burghausen | 84 | (0) |
| 2010–2013 | VfL Osnabrück | 66 | (0) |
| 2010–2011 | → VfL Osnabrück II | 4 | (0) |
| 2013–2015 | SV Sandhausen | 61 | (0) |
| 2015–2025 | VfL Bochum | 272 | (0) |
| 2025 | SC Paderborn | 13 | (0) |
| 2026– | Alemannia Aachen | 9 | (0) |
- * Club domestic league appearances and goals as of 28 May 2026

Manuel Riemann-Lorenzen (born 9 September 1988) is a German professional footballer who plays as a goalkeeper for 3. Liga club Alemannia Aachen. He is the brother of fellow footballer Alexander Riemann.

== Club career ==
On 22 January 2025, Riemann signed with 2. Bundesliga club SC Paderborn.

== Honours ==
VfL Bochum

- 2. Bundesliga: 2020–21

== Career statistics ==
As of match played 18 May 2025

Appearances and goals by club, season and competition
| Club | Season | League | | | DFB-Pokal | | Other^{1} | | Total | |
| Club | Season | Division | Apps | Goals | Apps | Goals | Apps | Goals | Apps | Goals |
|---|---|---|---|---|---|---|---|---|---|---|
| Wacker Burghausen II | 2006–07 | Oberliga Bayern | 7 | 0 | — | | — | | 7 | 0 |
| Wacker Burghausen | 2006–07 | 2. Bundesliga | 1 | 0 | 0 | 0 | — | | 1 | 0 |
| Wacker Burghausen | 2007–08 | Regionalliga Süd | 32 | 0 | 1 | 0 | — | | 33 | 0 |
| Wacker Burghausen | 2008–09 | 3. Liga | 26 | 0 | — | | — | | 26 | 0 |
| Wacker Burghausen | 2009–10 | 3. Liga | 25 | 0 | 1 | 0 | — | | 26 | 0 |
| Wacker Burghausen | Total | | 84 | 0 | 2 | 0 | — | | 86 | 0 |
| VfL Osnabrück II | 2010–11 | Oberliga Niedersachsen | 4 | 0 | — | | — | | 4 | 0 |
| VfL Osnabrück | 2010–11 | 2. Bundesliga | 0 | 0 | 0 | 0 | 0 | 0 | 0 | 0 |
| VfL Osnabrück | 2011–12 | 3. Liga | 35 | 0 | 1 | 0 | — | | 36 | 0 |
| VfL Osnabrück | 2012–13 | 3. Liga | 31 | 0 | — | | 2 (Note: Appearances in 3. Liga promotion play-offs) | 0 | 33 | 0 |
| VfL Osnabrück | Total | | 66 | 0 | 1 | 0 | 2 | 0 | 69 | 0 |
| SV Sandhausen | 2013–14 | 2. Bundesliga | 32 | 0 | 3 | 0 | — | | 35 | 0 |
| SV Sandhausen | 2014–15 | 2. Bundesliga | 29 | 0 | 1 | 0 | — | | 30 | 0 |
| SV Sandhausen | Total | | 61 | 0 | 4 | 0 | — | | 65 | 0 |
| VfL Bochum | 2015–16 | 2. Bundesliga | 18 | 0 | 4 | 0 | — | | 22 | 0 |
| VfL Bochum | 2016–17 | 2. Bundesliga | 34 | 0 | 1 | 0 | — | | 35 | 0 |
| VfL Bochum | 2017–18 | 2. Bundesliga | 26 | 0 | 1 | 0 | — | | 27 | 0 |
| VfL Bochum | 2018–19 | 2. Bundesliga | 34 | 0 | 0 | 0 | — | | 34 | 0 |
| VfL Bochum | 2019–20 | 2. Bundesliga | 32 | 0 | 2 | 0 | — | | 34 | 0 |
| VfL Bochum | 2020–21 | 2. Bundesliga | 30 | 0 | 2 | 0 | — | | 32 | 0 |
| VfL Bochum | 2021–22 | Bundesliga | 31 | 0 | 4 | 0 | — | | 35 | 0 |
| VfL Bochum | 2022–23 | Bundesliga | 34 | 0 | 3 | 0 | — | | 37 | 0 |
| VfL Bochum | 2023–24 | Bundesliga | 33 | 0 | 1 | 0 | 0 | 0 | 34 | 0 |
| VfL Bochum | Total | | 272 | 0 | 18 | 0 | 0 | 0 | 290 | 0 |
| SC Paderborn | 2024–25 | 2. Bundesliga | 13 | 0 | — | | — | | 13 | 0 |
| Career total | | | 507 | 0 | 25 | 0 | 2 | 0 | 534 | 0 |
