= Erhan Mašović =

Serbian footballer

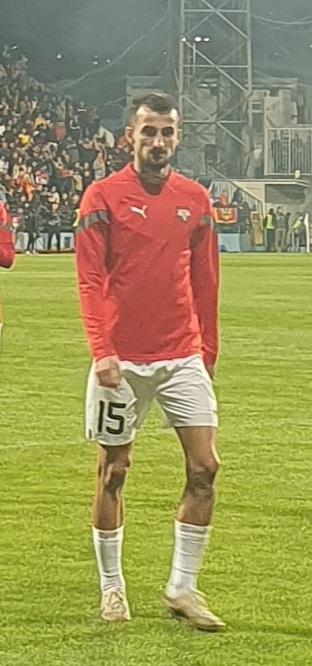
- Mašović with Serbia in 2023

Personal information
- Date of birth: 22 November 1998 (age 28)
- Place of birth: Novi Pazar, Serbia, FR Yugoslavia
- Height: 1.89 m (6 ft 2 in)
- Positions: Centre-back; defensive midfielder

Team information
- Current team: Vojvodina
- Number: 15

Youth career
- 2013–2016: Čukarički

Senior career*
Years	Team	Apps	(Gls)
2015–2017	Čukarički	34	(0)
2017–2020	Club Brugge	0	(0)
2018–2019	→ AS Trenčín (loan)	14	(0)
2019–2020	→ Horsens (loan)	18	(0)
2020–2026	VfL Bochum	116	(5)
2026–	Vojvodina	12	(0)

International career^{‡}
2013–2014	Serbia U16	9	(0)
2014–2015	Serbia U17	11	(0)
2015–2016	Serbia U18	12	(2)
2016–2017	Serbia U19	9	(0)
2017–2020	Serbia U21	21	(2)
2022–	Serbia	5	(0)
- * Club domestic league appearances and goals as of 22 November 2026 ‡ National team caps and goals as of 25 March 2024

Erhan Mašović (Serbian Cyrillic: Ерхан Машовић; born 22 November 1998) is a Serbian professional footballer who plays as a centre-back or defensive midfielder for Serbian SuperLiga club Vojvodina.

== Club career ==
=== Čukarički ===
Born in Novi Pazar, Mašović moved from his home town to Belgrade, where he joined Čukarički in summer 2013. During the first half of 2015–16 season, Erhan spent on the bench several SuperLiga matches. Mašović signed his first professional contract with Čukarički at the beginning of 2016, along with a few more players from class. He made his official debut for the first team of Čukarički on 27 February 2016 in a match against Radnik Surdulica. He was also in starting 11 in next fixture, against Javor Ivanjica. Mašović made 39 appearances in all competitions for Čukarički between 2016 and 2017.

=== Club Brugge ===
Mašović signed a four-year contract with Club Brugge on 3 May 2017. On 19 July 2019, Mašović was loaned out to Danish Superliga club Horsens for the 2019–20 season.

=== VfL Bochum ===
On 5 October 2020, the last day of the 2020 summer transfer window, Mašović moved to 2. Bundesliga club VfL Bochum on a free transfer having agreed a three-year contract.

=== Vojvodina ===
On 11 August 2026, Mašović signed a two-year deal with Vojvodina.

== International career ==
Mašović scored a goal for U18 national team in a match against Israel, ending of 2015. Previously, he was a member of Serbia U16 and Serbia U17 national teams. In August 2016, Mašović was called into Serbia U19 squad for memorial tournament "Stevan Vilotić - Ćele", where he debuted in opening match against United States. Mašović got his first call in Serbian under-21 team by coach Goran Đorović in August 2017.

Mašović debuted for the senior Serbian team on 5 June 2022, in a 4–1 victory over Slovenia in the Nations League.

== Career statistics ==
=== Club ===
As of 22 November 2026

Appearances and goals by club, season and competition
Club	Season	League			Cup		Continental		Other		Total	
Club	Season	Division	Apps	Goals	Apps	Goals	Apps	Goals	Apps	Goals	Apps	Goals
Čukarički	2015–16	Serbian SuperLiga	6	0	0	0	—		5 (Note: Appearances in the 2015–16 Serbian SuperLiga Championship play-offs.)	0	11	0
Čukarički	2016–17	Serbian SuperLiga	22	0	3	0	2	0	1 (Note: Appearances in the 2016–17 Serbian SuperLiga Relegation play-offs.)	0	28	0
Čukarički	Total		28	0	3	0	2	0	6	0	39	0
Club Brugge	2017–18	Belgian First Division A	0	0	0	0	0	0	—		0	0
Club Brugge	2020–21	Belgian First Division A	0	0	0	0	0	0	0 (Note: Appearances in the 2020 Belgian Super Cup.)	0	0	0
Club Brugge	Total		0	0	0	0	0	0	0	0	0	0
Trenčín (loan)	2018–19	Slovak Super Liga	12	0	1	0	1	0	3 (Note: Appearances in the 2018–19 Slovak First League Relegation play-offs.)	0	17	0
Horsens (loan)	2019–20	Danish Superliga	16	0	4	0	—		2 (Note: Appearances in the 2019–20 Danish Superliga Relegation play-offs.)	0	22	0
Club Brugge B	2020–21	Belgian First Division B	1	0	—		—		—		1	0
VfL Bochum	2020–21	2. Bundesliga	8	0	2	0	—		—		10	0
VfL Bochum	2021–22	Bundesliga	20	0	2	0	—		—		22	0
VfL Bochum	2022–23	Bundesliga	29	4	3	0	—		—		32	4
VfL Bochum	2023–24	Bundesliga	29	0	1	0	—		1 (Note: Appearances in the 2023–24 Bundesliga Relegation play-offs.)	0	31	0
VfL Bochum	2024–25	Bundesliga	16	1	1	0	—		—		17	1
VfL Bochum	2025–26	2. Bundesliga	13	0	2	0	—		—		15	0
VfL Bochum	Total		115	5	11	0	—		1	0	127	5
FK Vojvodina	2026–27	Serbian SuperLiga	12	0	1	0	—		—		13	0
Career total			184	5	20	0	3	0	12	0	219	5

=== International ===
As of 16 June 2023

Appearances and goals by national team and year
National team	Year	Apps	Goals
Serbia	2022	2	0
Serbia	2023	1	0
Total		3	0
