= Keven Schlotterbeck =

German footballer (born 1997)

Personal information
- Full name: Keven Matteo Schlotterbeck
- Date of birth: 28 April 1997 (age 29)
- Place of birth: Weinstadt, Germany
- Height: 1.89 m (6 ft 2 in)
- Position: Centre-back

Team information
- Current team: Southampton
- Number: 13

Youth career
- –2012: Stuttgarter Kickers
- 2012–2014: TSG Backnang
- 2014–2015: VfL Kirchheim/Teck

Senior career*
Years	Team	Apps	(Gls)
2015–2017	TSG Backnang	57	(11)
2016	TSG Backnang II	3	(1)
2017–2021	SC Freiburg II	49	(4)
2018–2024	SC Freiburg	47	(0)
2019–2020	→ Union Berlin (loan)	23	(0)
2023	→ VfL Bochum (loan)	13	(2)
2023–2024	→ VfL Bochum (loan)	27	(5)
2024–2026	FC Augsburg	42	(3)
2026–	Southampton	13	(2)

International career
2021	Germany Olympic	3	(0)
- * Club domestic league appearances and goals as of 17:40, 7 November 2026 (UTC)

Keven Matteo Schlotterbeck (born 28 April 1997) is a German professional footballer who plays as a centre-back for EFL Championship club Southampton.

Schlotterbeck began his career with TSG Backnang before moving to SC Freiburg in 2017. He had loan spells with Union Berlin and VfL Bochum. In June 2024, Schlotterbeck joined FC Augsburg. He moved to Southampton in August 2026. Schlotterbeck represented Germany at the 2020 Summer Olympics.

== Career ==
=== SC Freiburg ===
Schlotterbeck made his professional debut for SC Freiburg in the Bundesliga on 3 February 2019, coming on as a substitute in the 38th minute for Manuel Gulde in the 2–2 away draw against VfB Stuttgart.

At the end of the 2019–20 season, Schlotterbeck returned to SC Freiburg after his season-long loan with Union Berlin ended.

Schlotterbeck was part of the 2021–22 DFB–Pokal campaign, in which his team SC Freiburg reached the final. He would be substituted in extra time, playing alongside his brother Nico. His team lost 4–2 against RB Leipzig on penalties after a 1–1 draw in regular time. He scored his penalty as his team's third penalty taker in the shootout.

On 2 January 2023, he joined VfL Bochum on loan until the end of the 2022–23 season.

Upon returning from loan, Schlotterbeck remained on the Freiburg bench in the opening game of the season, and on 22 August 2023 he returned to VfL Bochum on a new season-long loan.

=== FC Augsburg ===
On 28 June 2024, Schlotterbeck signed a three-year contract with FC Augsburg.

=== Southampton ===
On 27 August 2026, Schlotterbeck joined EFL Championship club Southampton on a three‑year contract. He made his debut in the competition two days later in a 5–1 victory against Millwall. On 1 September, Schlotterbeck scored his first league goal in a 1–1 away draw with Birmingham City. During a 1–0 defeat against Preston North End on 7 November, he dislocated his shoulder and was expected to be sidelined for six weeks.

== Personal life ==
Schlotterbeck is the nephew of former professional footballer Niels Schlotterbeck, who also played for SC Freiburg. His younger brother, Nico, is also a professional footballer, playing for Bundesliga club Borussia Dortmund.

== Career statistics ==
As of match played 7 November 2026

Appearances and goals by club, season and competition
Club	Season	League			Cup		Europe		Other		Total	
Club	Season	Division	Apps	Goals	Apps	Goals	Apps	Goals	Apps	Goals	Apps	Goals
TSG Backnang	2015–16	Verbandsliga Württemberg	29	3	—		—		—		29	3
TSG Backnang	2016–17	Verbandsliga Württemberg	28	8	2	0	—		—		30	8
TSG Backnang	Total		57	11	2	0	—		—		59	11
TSG Backnang II	2016–17	Bezirksliga Rems-Murr	3	1	—		—		—		3	1
SC Freiburg II	2017–18	Regionalliga Südwest	35	3	—		—		—		35	3
SC Freiburg II	2018–19	Regionalliga Südwest	11	0	—		—		—		11	0
SC Freiburg II	2020–21	Regionalliga Südwest	2	1	—		—		—		2	1
SC Freiburg II	2021–22	3. Liga	1	0	—		—		—		1	0
SC Freiburg II	Total		49	4	—		—		—		49	4
SC Freiburg	2018–19	Bundesliga	9	0	0	0	—		—		9	0
SC Freiburg	2020–21	Bundesliga	24	0	1	0	—		—		25	0
SC Freiburg	2021–22	Bundesliga	12	0	2	1	—		—		14	1
SC Freiburg	2022–23	Bundesliga	2	0	1	0	2 (Note: Appearances in UEFA Europa League)	0	—		5	0
SC Freiburg	2023–24	Bundesliga	0	0	0	0	0	0	—		0	0
SC Freiburg	Total		47	0	3	1	—		—		50	1
Union Berlin (loan)	2019–20	Bundesliga	23	0	4	1	—		—		27	1
Bochum (loan)	2022–23	Bundesliga	13	2	0	0	—		—		13	2
Bochum (loan)	2023–24	Bundesliga	27	5	0	0	—		—		27	5
Augsburg	2024–25	Bundesliga	18	3	4	0	—		—		22	3
Augsburg	2025–26	Bundesliga	24	0	2	0	—		—		26	0
Augsburg	2026–27	Bundesliga	0	0	1	0	—		—		1	0
Augsburg	Total		42	3	7	0	—		—		49	3
Southampton	2026–27	Championship	13	2	0	0	—		—		13	2
Career total			274	28	17	2	2	0	0	0	293	30

== Honours ==
SC Freiburg

- DFB-Pokal runner-up: 2021–22
