= Thomas Letsch =

German football manager

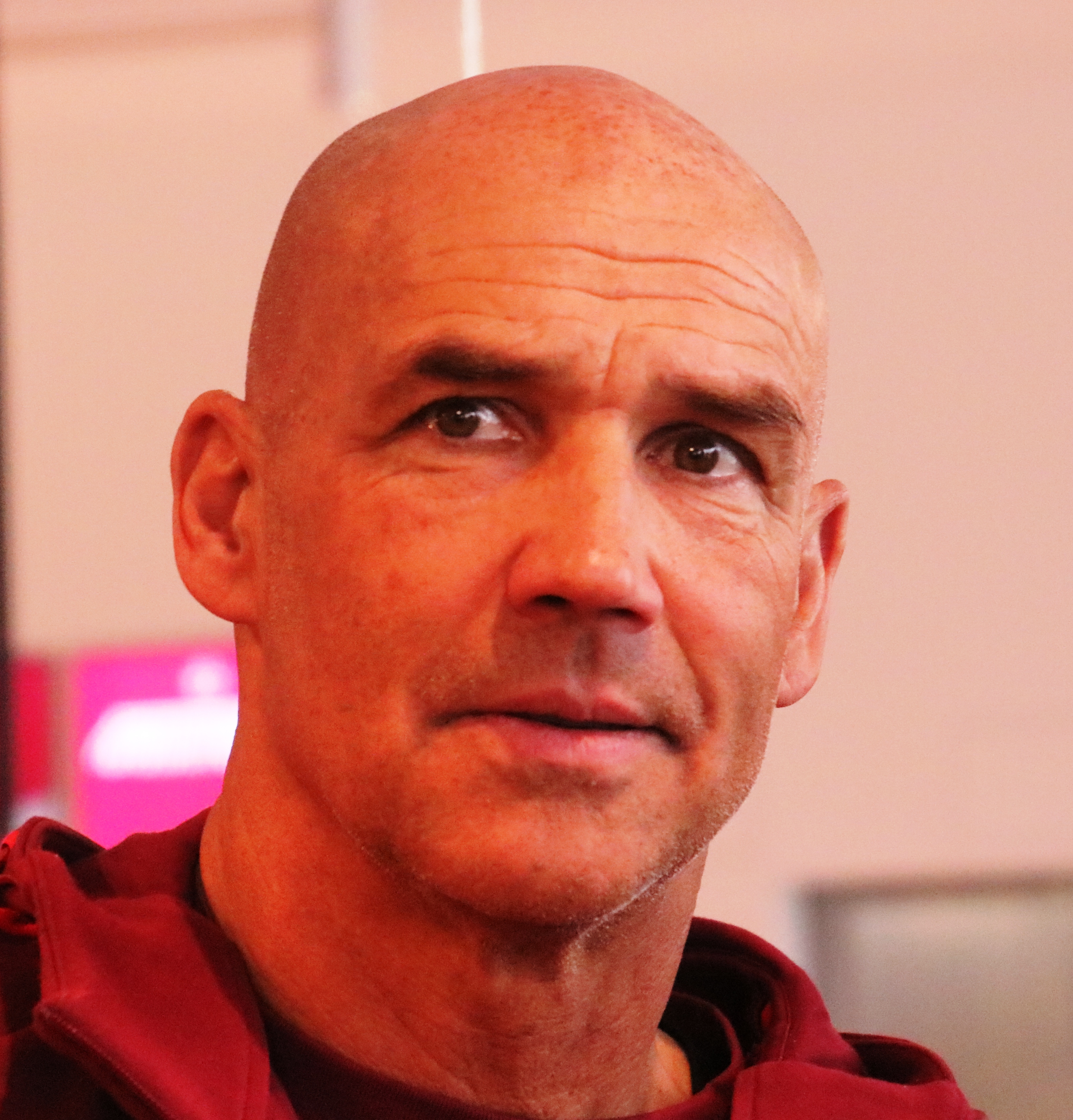
- Letsch as Red Bull Salzburg manager in 2026

Personal information
- Date of birth: 26 August 1968 (age 58)
- Place of birth: Esslingen, West Germany
- Height: 1.90 m (6 ft 3 in)

Team information
- Current team: Al-Shabab (manager)

Managerial career
- Years: Team
- 1997–2000: VfB Oberesslingen/Zell (player-manager)
- 2001–2002: Stuttgarter Kickers II
- 2003–2004: FC Union Heilbronn
- 2008–2009: SG Sonnenhof Großaspach
- 2015: Red Bull Salzburg (caretaker)
- 2015–2017: FC Liefering
- 2017: Erzgebirge Aue
- 2018–2019: Austria Wien
- 2020–2022: Vitesse Arnhem
- 2022–2024: VfL Bochum
- 2024–2026: Red Bull Salzburg
- 2026–: Al-Shabab

Thomas Letsch (born 26 August 1968) is a German professional football manager who is currently the manager of Al-Shabab.

== Managerial career ==
Letsch was never a professional footballer and started his coaching career at VfB Oberesslingen/Zell as player-manager. In July 2001, he became manager of Stuttgarter Kickers's reserve team until 2002, but was also a part of the first team staff until the end of the 2002–03 season. He then moved to FC Union Heilbronn and was the manager for one season. From January 2005 until July 2007, he was the assistant manager of SSV Ulm 1846. From January 2008 to June 2009, he was the manager of SG Sonnenhof Großaspach.

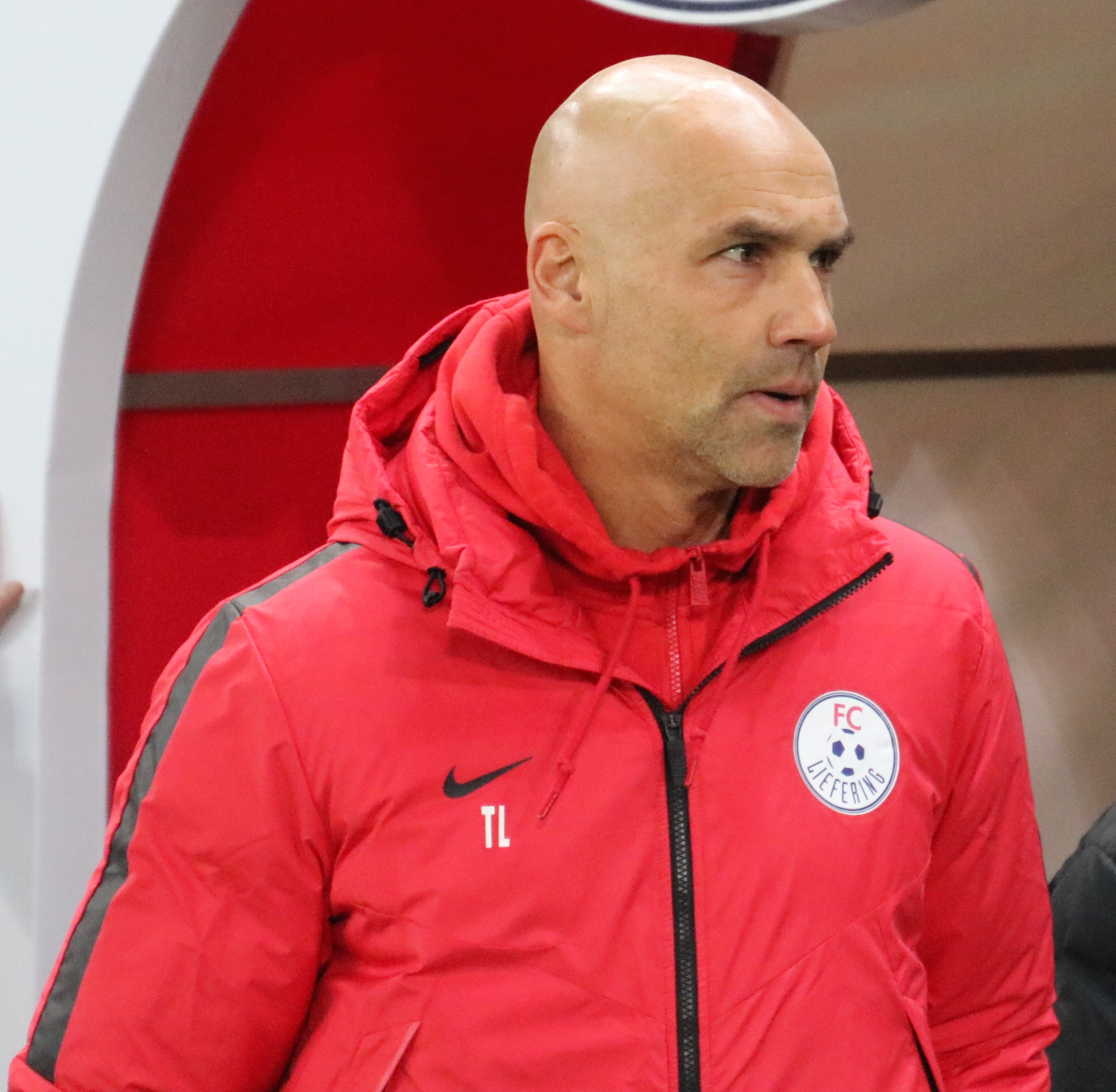
Letsch managing FC Liefering in 2016

In July 2012 he went to Salzburg where managed the under-16 team of FC Red Bull Salzburg. Two months later, he was also appointed as football director of academy. In the following season, he was promoted to first team assistant manager. From July 2014, he was manager for the under-18 squad. During his time with the under-18s, he was also the assistant coach for FC Red Bull Salzburg. In December 2015, after the firing of Peter Zeidler, he was for two matches head coach of Salzburg. In the 2015–16 season, he also managed the team of FC Red Bull Salzburg in the UEFA Youth League. Following Zeidler, he became manager of FC Liefering in June 2015.

On 18 June 2017, Erzgebirge Aue appointed Letsch as their new manager, replacing the Schalke 04-bound Domenico Tedesco on a three-year contract. However, after just three games, Aue sacked Letsch due to the club's poor form and results.

On 27 February 2018, he was appointed Austria Wien manager until the end of 2017–18 season, replacing Thorsten Fink. He was sacked on 11 March 2019.

On 26 May 2020, he was announced as the new manager of Vitesse Arnhem after club icon Edward Sturing. Letsch made a good start to the 2020–21 season. The club went on to secure fourth place in the Eredivisie, reached the final of the Dutch Cup (which was lost 2–1 to AFC Ajax) and ensuring qualification for the UEFA Europa Conference League.

In September 2022, he left Arnhem and moved to VfL Bochum. After the club fell to 15th place in the 2023–24 season, Letsch was sacked on 8 April 2024.

On 18 December 2024, Letsch signed a contract to return to Red Bull Salzburg in Austria until the summer of 2027. He was sacked on 17 February 2026 despite the club being in 1st place.

On 10 July 2026, Letsch was appointed manager of Al-Shabab.

== Managerial statistics ==
As of match played 15 February 2026

Managerial record by team and tenure
Team	From	To	Record				
Team	From	To	G	W	D	L	Win %
SG Sonnenhof Großaspach	3 January 2008	30 June 2009	50	29	11	10	58.00
FC Liefering	1 July 2015	30 June 2017	72	34	15	23	47.22
Red Bull Salzburg (caretaker)	3 December 2015	14 December 2015	2	1	1	0	50.00
Erzgebirge Aue	1 July 2017	14 August 2017	3	0	0	3	0.00
Austria Wien	27 February 2018	11 March 2019	37	17	4	16	45.95
Vitesse	1 July 2020	21 September 2022	101	48	19	34	47.52
VfL Bochum	22 September 2022	8 April 2024	58	16	15	27	27.59
Red Bull Salzburg	18 December 2024	17 February 2026	57	26	12	19	45.61
Total			380	171	77	132	45.00
