= Takashi Uchino (footballer, born 2001) =

Japanese footballer (born 2001)

Takashi Uchino 内野 貴史
Personal information
- Date of birth: 7 March 2001 (age 25)
- Place of birth: Chiba, Japan
- Height: 1.77 m (5 ft 10 in)
- Position: Right-back

Team information
- Current team: Dibba (on loan from Al Wasl)
- Number: 22

Youth career
- Shinmatsudo SC
- Kashiwa Reysol
- 2013–2018: JEF United Chiba
- 2018–2019: 1. FC Düren
- 2019–2020: Alemannia Aachen

Senior career*
Years	Team	Apps	(Gls)
2020–2021	Alemannia Aachen	35	(0)
2021–2024	Fortuna Düsseldorf II	43	(0)
2022–2024	Fortuna Düsseldorf	22	(1)
2024–	Al Wasl	11	(0)
2025–	→ Dibba (loan)	2	(0)

International career^{‡}
2022	Japan U20	1	(0)
2023	Japan U22	2	(0)
2022–	Japan U23	15	(0)
Medal record
Men's football
Representing Japan
AFC U-23 Asian Cup
Bronze medal – third place	2022 Uzbekistan	Team
Gold medal – first place	2024 Qatar	Team
- * Club domestic league appearances and goals as of 4 August 2024 ‡ National team caps and goals as of 3 May 2024

Takashi Uchino (内野 貴史, Uchino Takashi; born 7 March 2001) is a Japanese professional footballer who plays as a right-back for Emirati club Dibba, on loan from Al Wasl.

== Club career ==
Born in Chiba Prefecture, Japan, Uchino started his career with Shinmatsudo SC. He later joined professional sides Kashiwa Reysol and JEF United Chiba, before moving to Germany to sign with 1. FC Düren in 2018. The following year, he signed for Alemannia Aachen, and would go on to make 35 appearances in the Regionalliga.

A move to Fortuna Düsseldorf would follow, and Uchino would go on to make a number of appearances for the club's reserve team, before making his 2. Bundesliga debut in March 2022.

On 8 August 2024, Fortuna Düsseldorf announced Uchino's transfer to Al Wasl in the United Arab Emirates.

== International career ==
In March 2022, Uchino was called up to the Japan national under-21 football team for the Dubai Cup.

On 4 April 2024, Uchino was called up to the Japan U23 squad for the 2024 AFC U-23 Asian Cup.

== Career statistics ==
=== Club ===
As of 28 July 2023

Appearances and goals by club, season and competition
Club	Season	League			Cup		Other		Total	
Club	Season	Division	Apps	Goals	Apps	Goals	Apps	Goals	Apps	Goals
Alemannia Aachen	2020–21	Regionalliga West	35	0	0	0	0	0	35	0
Alemannia Aachen	Total		35	0	0	0	0	0	35	0
Fortuna Düsseldorf II	2021–22	Regionalliga West	31	0	–		0	0	31	0
Fortuna Düsseldorf II	2022-23	Regionalliga West	11	0	–		0	0	11	0
Fortuna Düsseldorf	2021–22	2. Bundesliga	2	0	0	0	0	0	2	0
Fortuna Düsseldorf	2022-23	2. Bundesliga	4	0	0	0	0	0	4	0
Fortuna Düsseldorf	2023-24	2. Bundesliga								
Fortuna Düsseldorf	Total		6	0	0	0	0	0	6	0
Career total			83	0	0	0	0	0	83	0

== Honours ==
Japan U23

- AFC U-23 Asian Cup: 2024
