= Simon Zoller =

German footballer

Personal information
- Date of birth: 26 June 1991 (age 35)
- Place of birth: Friedrichshafen, Germany
- Height: 1.79 m (5 ft 10 in)
- Position: Striker

Youth career
- TSV Fischbach
- TSG Ailingen
- Germania Singen
- 1. FC Pforzheim
- –2005: VfB Friedrichshafen
- 2005–2007: VfB Stuttgart
- 2007–2008: SSV Ulm 1846

Senior career*
Years	Team	Apps	(Gls)
2008–2012	Karlsruher SC II	56	(18)
2010–2012	Karlsruher SC	13	(1)
2012–2013	VfL Osnabrück	36	(15)
2013–2014	1. FC Kaiserslautern	28	(13)
2014–2018	1. FC Köln	78	(11)
2015	→ 1. FC Kaiserslautern (loan)	13	(3)
2015–2018	1. FC Köln II	2	(0)
2019–2023	VfL Bochum	101	(29)
2023–2025	FC St. Pauli	4	(0)
- * Club domestic league appearances and goals

Simon Zoller (born 26 June 1991) is a German former professional footballer who played as a striker.

== Career ==
Zoller began his career with Karlsruher SC, and made his debut for the club in November 2010, as a substitute for Patrick Dulleck in a 0–0 draw with VfL Osnabrück in the 2. Bundesliga. Karlsruhe were relegated to the 3. Liga at the end of the following season.

Zoller left the club, signing for VfL Osnabrück, along with teammates Marcus Piossek and Timo Staffeldt.

In June 2013, he signed a four-year contract with 2. Bundesliga side 1. FC Kaiserslautern.

A year later, after outstanding performances for Kaiserslautern, he signed for recently promoted Bundesliga side 1. FC Köln on a four-year deal. Köln had to pay a transfer fee of reportedly €3 million.

However, Zoller could not fulfill the high expectations during the first half of the 2014–15 campaign and returned subsequently in the winter break on loan to 1. FC Kaiserslautern for the remainder of the season. After an extended period of limited playing time in 2018, it was announced that Zoller would join VfL Bochum from January 2019.

On 1 September 2023, Zoller signed with St. Pauli.

== Personal life ==
Zoller married television presenter Laura Wontorra on 12 November 2016. Laura is the daughter of journalist Jörg Wontorra.

== Career statistics ==
As of match played 16 March 2024

Appearances and goals by club, season and competition
Club	Season	League			Cup		Continental		Other		Total	
Club	Season	Division	Apps	Goals	Apps	Goals	Apps	Goals	Apps	Goals	Apps	Goals
Karlsruher SC II	2008–09	Regionalliga Süd	5	0	—		—		—		5	0
Karlsruher SC II	2009–10	Regionalliga Süd	17	6	—		—		—		17	6
Karlsruher SC II	2010–11	Regionalliga Süd	19	5	—		—		—		19	5
Karlsruher SC II	2011–12	Regionalliga Süd	15	7	—		—		—		15	7
Karlsruher SC II	Total		56	18	0	0	0	0	0	0	56	18
Karlsruher SC	2010–11	2. Bundesliga	7	0	0	0	—		—		7	0
Karlsruher SC	2011–12	2. Bundesliga	6	1	0	0	—		—		6	1
Karlsruher SC	Total		13	1	0	0	0	0	0	0	13	1
VfL Osnabrück	2012–13	3. Liga	36	15	0	0	—		2 (Note: Appearance(s) in the Promotion play-offs)	0	38	15
1. FC Kaiserslautern	2013–14	2. Bundesliga	28	13	2	2	—		—		30	15
1. FC Köln	2014–15	Bundesliga	9	1	2	1	—		—		11	2
1. FC Köln	2015–16	Bundesliga	24	6	2	1	—		—		26	7
1. FC Köln	2016–17	Bundesliga	26	2	3	0	—		—		29	2
1. FC Köln	2017–18	Bundesliga	17	2	2	2	3	1	—		22	5
1. FC Köln	2018–19	2. Bundesliga	2	0	1	0	—		—		3	0
1. FC Köln	Total		78	11	10	4	3	1	0	0	91	16
1. FC Köln II	2015–16	Regionalliga West	1	0	—		—		—		1	0
1. FC Köln II	2018–19	Regionalliga West	1	0	—		—		—		1	0
1. FC Köln II	Total		2	0	0	0	0	0	0	0	2	0
1. FC Kaiserslautern (loan)	2014–15	2. Bundesliga	13	3	1	0	—		—		14	3
VfL Bochum	2018–19	2. Bundesliga	8	2	—		—		—		8	2
VfL Bochum	2019–20	2. Bundesliga	23	6	2	0	—		—		25	6
VfL Bochum	2020–21	2. Bundesliga	32	15	3	1	—		—		35	16
VfL Bochum	2021–22	Bundesliga	10	3	1	1	—		—		11	4
VfL Bochum	2022–23	Bundesliga	27	3	1	1	—		—		28	4
VfL Bochum	2023–24	Bundesliga	1	0	1	1	—		—		2	1
VfL Bochum	Total		101	29	8	4	0	0	0	0	109	33
FC St. Pauli	2023–24	2. Bundesliga	4	0	1	0	—		—		5	0
Career total			331	88	22	10	3	1	2	0	348	100

== Honours ==
FC St. Pauli

- 2.Bundesliga : 2023–24
