= Yannik Engelhardt =

German footballer

Personal information
- Date of birth: 7 February 2001 (age 25)
- Place of birth: Göttingen, Germany
- Height: 1.84 m (6 ft 0 in)
- Position: Midfielder

Team information
- Current team: SC Freiburg
- Number: 16

Youth career
- –2014: JSG Eintracht HöhBernSee
- 2014–2015: JFV Eichsfeld
- 2015–2019: Werder Bremen

Senior career*
Years	Team	Apps	(Gls)
2019–2023	Werder Bremen II	11	(0)
2021–2023	→ SC Freiburg II (loan)	54	(3)
2023	SC Freiburg II	0	(0)
2023–2024	Fortuna Düsseldorf	30	(3)
2024–2026	Como	26	(1)
2025–2026	→ Borussia Mönchengladbach (loan)	31	(2)
2026–	SC Freiburg	7	(2)

International career^{‡}
2018–2019	Germany U18	4	(2)
2019	Germany U19	2	(1)
2020	Germany U20	3	(1)
2026–	Germany	1	(0)
- * Club domestic league appearances and goals as of 17:30, 31 October 2026 (UTC) ‡ National team caps and goals as of 23:45, 23 September 2026 (UTC)

Yannik Engelhardt (born 7 February 2001) is a German professional footballer who plays as a midfielder for Bundesliga club SC Freiburg and the Germany national team.

== Club career ==
Engelhardt made his senior professional football debut for Werder Bremen II during the 2019–20 season.

In 2021, Engelhardt moved to SC Freiburg on a two-year loan spell. He made 54 appearances for SC Freiburg II, scoring three goals.

On 12 June 2023, Engelhardt agreed a deal to join Fortuna Düsseldorf ahead of the 2023–24 season.

On 1 August 2024, Engelhardt signed a three-year contract with Como in Italy.

On 1 September 2025, Engelhardt signed for Borussia Mönchengladbach on a one-year loan.

== International career ==
Engelhardt is a German youth international, having represented the U18, U19 and U20 teams.

In September 2026, he was one of players who were called up with the Germany national team by head coach Jürgen Klopp for the 2026–27 UEFA Nations League matches against Netherlands, Greece, Serbia and Greece between 24 September and 4 October 2026. Engelhardt made his debut on 24 September 2026 against the Netherlands.

== Career statistics ==
=== Club ===
As of match played 31 October 2026

Appearances and goals by club, season and competition
Club	Season	League			National cup (Note: Includes DFB-Pokal)		Continental		Other		Total	
Club	Season	Division	Apps	Goals	Apps	Goals	Apps	Goals	Apps	Goals	Apps	Goals
Werder Bremen II	2019–20	Regionalliga	3	0	—		—		—		3	0
Werder Bremen II	2020–21	Regionalliga	8	0	—		—		—		8	0
Werder Bremen II	Total		11	0	—		—		—		11	0
SC Freiburg II (loan)	2021–22	3. Liga	29	1	—		—		—		29	1
SC Freiburg II (loan)	2022-23	3. Liga	25	2	—		—		—		25	2
SC Freiburg II (loan)	Total		54	3	—		—		—		54	3
Fortuna Düsseldorf	2023–24	2. Bundesliga	30	3	5	0	—		2 (Note: Appearances in promotion play-offs)	1	37	4
Como	2024–25	Serie A	26	1	0	0	—		—		26	1
Borussia Mönchengladbach (loan)	2025–26	Bundesliga	31	2	1	0	—		—		32	2
SC Freiburg	2026–27	Bundesliga	7	2	1	0	2 (Note: Appearances in UEFA Conference League)	0	—		10	2
Career total			159	11	7	0	2	0	2	1	170	12

=== International ===
As of match played 24 September 2026

Appearances and goals by national team and year
National team	Year	Apps	Goals
Germany	2026	1	0
Total		1	0
