= Anthony Losilla =

French professional footballer (born 1986)

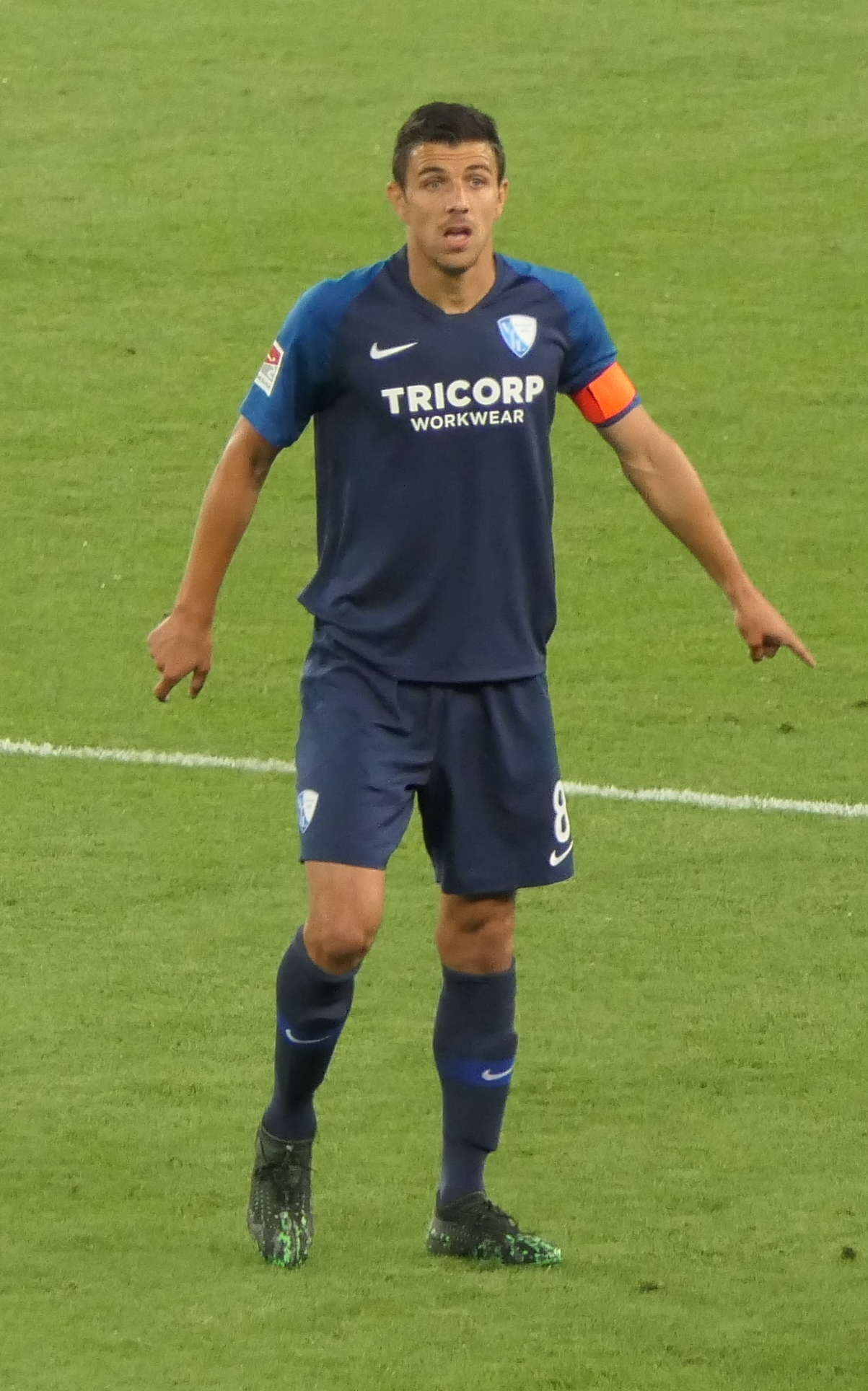
- Losilla playing for VfL Bochum in 2019.

Personal information
- Date of birth: 10 March 1986 (age 40)
- Place of birth: Firminy, France
- Height: 1.85 m (6 ft 1 in)
- Position: Defensive midfielder

Team information
- Current team: VfL Bochum (assistant coach)

Youth career
- 1992–1993: FC Pont-Salomon
- 1993–1994: Olympique Firminy
- 1994–2004: Saint-Étienne

Senior career*
Years	Team	Apps	(Gls)
2004–2006	Saint-Étienne B	52	(1)
2006–2008	Cannes	72	(2)
2008–2010	Paris FC	70	(7)
2010–2012	Laval	70	(4)
2012–2014	Dynamo Dresden	65	(3)
2014–2025	VfL Bochum	339	(20)
Total		668	(37)

Managerial career
- 2025–: VfL Bochum (assistant)
- * Club domestic league appearances and goals

Anthony Losilla (born 10 March 1986) is a French professional football coach and former player who played as a defensive midfielder. He is currently the assistant coach of Bundesliga club VfL Bochum.

== Career ==
Anthony Losilla helped VfL Bochum win promotion to the Bundesliga . Anthony Losilla and VfL Bochum won the 2. Bundesliga in the 2020–21 season to secure promotion to the Bundesliga.

On 8 May 2025, VfL Bochum announced the retirement of Losilla after the season. A club legend playing 364 matches for the club.

== Personal life ==
Anthony Losilla is of Spanish descent.

== Career statistics ==
As of match played 17 May 2025

Appearances and goals by club, season and competition
Club	Season	League			National Cup		League Cup		Other		Total	
Club	Season	Division	Apps	Goals	Apps	Goals	Apps	Goals	Apps	Goals	Apps	Goals
Saint-Étienne B	2004–05	CFA	19	0	—		—		—		19	0
Saint-Étienne B	2005–06	CFA	33	1	—		—		—		33	1
Saint-Étienne B	Total		52	1	0	0	0	0	0	0	52	1
Cannes	2006–07	National	37	0	—		—		—		37	0
Cannes	2007–08	National	35	2	—		—		—		35	2
Cannes	Total		72	2	0	0	0	0	0	0	72	2
Paris FC	2008–09	National	36	3	2	1	—		—		38	4
Paris FC	2009–10	National	34	4	—		—		—		34	4
Paris FC	Total		70	7	2	1	0	0	0	0	72	8
Laval	2010–11	Ligue 2	34	2	2	0	1	0	—		37	2
Laval	2011–12	Ligue 2	36	2	2	0	1	0	—		39	2
Laval	Total		70	4	4	0	2	0	0	0	76	4
Dynamo Dresden	2012–13	2. Bundesliga	31	3	2	0	—		2 (Note: Appearances in the 2. Bundesliga relegation play-offs)	0	35	3
Dynamo Dresden	2013–14	2. Bundesliga	34	0	—		—		—		34	0
Dynamo Dresden	Total		65	3	2	0	0	0	2	0	69	3
VfL Bochum	2014–15	2. Bundesliga	33	1	2	0	—		—		35	1
VfL Bochum	2015–16	2. Bundesliga	32	1	4	0	—		—		36	1
VfL Bochum	2016–17	2. Bundesliga	30	2	1	0	—		—		31	2
VfL Bochum	2017–18	2. Bundesliga	31	0	1	0	—		—		32	0
VfL Bochum	2018–19	2. Bundesliga	32	2	1	0	—		—		33	2
VfL Bochum	2019–20	2. Bundesliga	33	5	2	0	—		—		35	5
VfL Bochum	2020–21	2. Bundesliga	32	4	3	0	—		—		35	4
VfL Bochum	2021–22	Bundesliga	33	2	4	0	—		—		37	2
VfL Bochum	2022–23	Bundesliga	31	2	3	1	—		—		34	3
VfL Bochum	2023–24	Bundesliga	31	1	2	0	—		2 (Note: Appearances in relegation play-offs)	0	35	1
VfL Bochum	2024–25	Bundesliga	21	0	1	0	—		—		22	0
VfL Bochum	Total		339	20	24	1	0	0	2	0	365	21
Career total			669	37	32	2	2	0	4	0	707	39
