= 2016–17 VfL Bochum season =

VfL Bochum
2016–17 season
- Chairman: Hans-Peter Villis
- Manager: Gertjan Verbeek
- Stadium: Vonovia-Ruhrstadion
- 2. Bundesliga: 9th
- DFB-Pokal: First Round
- Top goalscorer: League: Mlapa, Wurtz (both 8); All: Mlapa, Wurtz (both 8)
- Highest home attendance: 27,600 (vs FC St. Pauli, 21 May 2017)
- Lowest home attendance: 11,123 (vs Würzburger Kickers, 18 February 2017)
- Average home league attendance: 16,815
Home colours	Away colours

The 2016–17 VfL Bochum season is the 79th season in club history.

== Matches ==
=== Legend ===
Win Draw Loss

=== Friendly matches ===
2 July 2016 Friendly	VfL Bochum	5–0	Concordia Wiemelhausen	Bochum
17:00	Bastians 29' (pen.); Mlapa 33'; Sağlam 64'; Wurtz 70', 90'			Stadium: Leichtathletik-Platz am Vonovia-Ruhrstadion

7 July 2016 Friendly	LFC Laer 06	0–15	VfL Bochum	Bochum
18:30			Wurtz 6', 36', 43'; Weilandt 12', 37'; Losilla 18', 29'; Stiepermann 38'; Mlapa 54', 66', 70', 72', 87'; Pavlidis 62'; Sağlam 78'	Stadium: Sportplatz Havkenscheider Straße

9 July 2016 Friendly	KFC Uerdingen 05	1–2	VfL Bochum	Krefeld
17:00	Rankl 17'		Stöger 40'; Pavlidis 82'	Stadium: Bezirkssportanlage Hölschen Dyk; Attendance: 0

13 July 2016 Friendly	VfL Bochum	0–1	Brentford F.C.	Dülmen
19:00			Hogan 35'	Stadium: TSG Stadion

16 July 2016 Friendly	SV Eintracht Trier 05	1–0	VfL Bochum	Trier
15:00	Lienhard 7'			Stadium: Moselstadion; Referee: Luca Schlosser (Stahlhofen)

20 July 2016 Friendly	VfL Bochum	3–4	K.A.S. Eupen	Bochum
16:00	Wurtz 29'; Quaschner 33'; Weilandt 45'		Sylla 48', 52', 81'; Mouchamps 87'	Stadium: Vonovia-Ruhrstadion; Attendance: 0

23 July 2016 Friendly	SSV Jahn Regensburg	2–2	VfL Bochum	Regensburg
16:00	Thommy 11'; Grüttner 47'		Eisfeld 11'; Mlapa 20'	Stadium: Continental Arena; Attendance: 7,155; Referee: Benjamin Cortus (Röthenbach)

26 July 2016 Friendly	VfL Bochum	1–1	Cardiff City F.C.	Herne
19:00	Hoogland 26'		Whittingham 48' (pen.)	Stadium: Stadion am Schloss Strünkede

29 July 2016 Friendly	VfL Bochum	1–0	Hamburger SV	Bochum
20:00	Mlapa 3'			Stadium: Vonovia-Ruhrstadion; Attendance: 13,240; Referee: Guido Winkmann (Kerken)

22 August 2016 Friendly	VfL Bochum	1–1	SV Rödinghausen	Bochum
14:00	Pavlidis 90'		Höner 84'	Stadium: Leichtathletik-Platz am Vonovia-Ruhrstadion; Referee: Dustin Sikorski (Kamp-Lintfort)

1 September 2016 Friendly	1. FC Köln	3–4	VfL Bochum	Cologne
15:30	Osako 3'; Modeste 29', 53' (pen.)		Quaschner 28', 44'; Merkel 48'; Mlapa 67'	Stadium: Geißbockheim; Attendance: 0 Referee: Martin Thomsen (Kleve)

6 October 2016 Friendly	VfL Bochum	0–1	VfL Osnabrück	Bochum
16:00			Groß 37'	Stadium: Leichtathletik-Platz am Vonovia-Ruhrstadion; Attendance: 0

19 October 2016 Friendly	VfL Bochum	4–0	FC Schalke 04 II	Bochum
15:00	Sağlam 6'; Pavlidis 80', 83'; Bapoh 90'			Stadium: Leichtathletik-Platz am Vonovia-Ruhrstadion; Attendance: 0

11 November 2016 Friendly	FC Twente	0–0	VfL Bochum	Enschede
13:00				Stadium: De Grolsch Veste; Attendance: 0

7 January 2017 Friendly	VfL Bochum	0–1	1. FC Köln	Bochum
15:30			Clemens 7'	Stadium: Vonovia-Ruhrstadion; Attendance: 3,000; Referee: Sören Storks (Velen)

11 January 2017 Friendly	VfL Bochum	3–0	SpVgg Greuther Fürth	Bochum
13:30	Fabian 6'; Ngwisani 65'; Merkel 81'			Stadium: Vonovia-Ruhrstadion; Referee: Sven Waschitzki (Essen)

14 January 2017 Friendly	SV Darmstadt 98	2–1	VfL Bochum	Darmstadt
14:00	Rosenthal 18'; Gondorf 72'		Hoogland 57'	Stadium: Jonathan-Heimes-Stadion am Böllenfalltor; Attendance: 2,000; Referee: Johann Pfeiffer (Heusenstamm)

17 January 2017 Friendly	Bayer 04 Leverkusen	2–1	VfL Bochum	Leverkusen
14:00	Çalhanoğlu 8'; Pohjanpalo 80'		Sağlam 88'	Stadium: Ulrich-Haberland-Stadion; Attendance: 817

21 January 2017 Friendly	SC Preußen Münster	2–1	VfL Bochum	Münster
14:00	Tekerci 1'; Al-Hazaimeh 56'		Wydra 75'	Stadium: Preußenstadion; Attendance: 753; Referee: Guido Winkmann (Kerken)

31 January 2017 Friendly	Borussia Mönchengladbach	1–4	VfL Bochum	Mönchengladbach
14:00	Yeboah 86'		Wydra 22'; Pavlidis 40'; Bapoh 72', 83'	Stadium: Fohlenplatz; Attendance: 310; Referee: Martin Thomsen (Kleve)

22 March 2017 Friendly	VfL Bochum	1–2	ADO Den Haag	Bochum
14:30	Mlapa 2'		Wolters 15'; Becker 30'	Stadium: Leichtathletik-Platz am Vonovia-Ruhrstadion; Attendance: 0

29 April 2017 Friendly	VfL Bochum	1–0	South Africa U20	Bochum
	Quaschner 63'			Stadium: Leichtathletik-Platz am Vonovia-Ruhrstadion; Attendance: 0

=== 2. Bundesliga ===
==== League table ====
Pos	Team	Pld	W	D	L	GF	GA	GD	Pts
7	FC St. Pauli	34	12	9	13	39	35	+4	45
8	Greuther Fürth	34	12	9	13	33	40	−7	45
9	VfL Bochum	34	10	14	10	42	47	−5	44
10	SV Sandhausen	34	10	12	12	41	36	+5	42
11	Fortuna Düsseldorf	34	10	12	12	37	39	−2	42

Source: DFB
Rules for classification: 1) Points; 2) Goal difference; 3) Goals scored

==== Results summary ====
Overall								Home						Away					
Pld	W	D	L	GF	GA	GD	Pts	W	D	L	GF	GA	GD	W	D	L	GF	GA	GD
34	10	14	10	42	47	−5	44	7	8	2	27	22	+5	3	6	8	15	25	−10

==== Results by round ====
Round	1	2	3	4	5	6	7	8	9	10	11	12	13	14	15	16	17	18	19	20	21	22	23	24	25	26	27	28	29	30	31	32	33	34
Ground	H	A	H	A	H	A	H	A	H	A	H	A	H	A	A	H	A	A	H	A	H	A	H	A	H	A	H	A	H	A	H	H	A	H
Result	W	D	D	L	W	L	D	W	D	L	W	L	D	D	L	W	D	L	D	L	W	W	L	D	D	D	D	D	W	L	W	D	W	L
Position	2	3	5	11	7	10	9	7	8	11	9	11	11	11	13	11	11	11	12	13	13	10	12	11	11	11	11	11	9	10	8	9	7	9

A = Away; H = Home; W = Win; D = Draw; L = Loss

==== Matches ====
6 August 2016 1	VfL Bochum	2–1	1. FC Union Berlin	Bochum
13:00	Bastians 57'; Weilandt 77'		Kreilach 72'	Stadium: Vonovia-Ruhrstadion; Attendance: Robert Kampka (Mainz); Referee: 17,118

13 August 2016 2	Karlsruher SC	1–1	VfL Bochum	Karlsruhe
13:00	Diamantakos 65'		Celozzi 34'	Stadium: Wildparkstadion; Attendance: 14,504; Referee: Patrick Ittrich (Hamburg)

26 August 2016 3	VfL Bochum	1–1	Hannover 96	Bochum
18:30	Wurtz 73'		Sané 74'	Stadium: Vonovia-Ruhrstadion; Attendance: 19,218; Referee: Markus Schmidt (Stuttgart)

9 September 2016 4	Würzburger Kickers	2–0	VfL Bochum	Würzburg
18:30	Soriano 2'; Benatelli 90+2'			Stadium: flyeralarm Arena; Attendance: 10,473; Referee: Alexander Sather (Grimma)

16 September 2016 5	VfL Bochum	5–4	1. FC Nürnberg	Bochum
18:30	Stöger 4'; Bastians 7' (pen.); Mlapa 27', 55'; Quaschner 89'		Salli 18', 45+3' (pen.); Bulthuis 34'; Parker 90+2'	Stadium: Vonovia-Ruhrstadion; Attendance: 16,050; Referee: Lasse Koslowski (Berlin)

20 September 2016 6	Fortuna Düsseldorf	3–0	VfL Bochum	Düsseldorf
17:30	Sobottka 3'; Hennings 14'; Bellinghausen 68'			Stadium: Esprit Arena; Attendance: 22,688; Referee: Florian Badstübner (Windsbach)

23 September 2016 7	VfL Bochum	1–1	VfB Stuttgart	Bochum
18:30	Wurtz 57'		Gentner 80'	Stadium: Vonovia-Ruhrstadion; Attendance: 20,014; Referee: Daniel Siebert (Berlin)

30 September 2016 8	FC Erzgebirge Aue	2–4	VfL Bochum	Aue
18:30	Köpke 5'; Skarlatidis 12'		Wurtz 2'; Eisfeld 14'; Gyamerah 70'; Mlapa 90+1'	Stadium: Sparkassen-Erzgebirgsstadion; Attendance: 7,300; Referee: Martin Thomsen (Kleve)

14 October 2016 9	VfL Bochum	2–2	SV Sandhausen	Bochum
18:30	Hoogland 60'; Wurtz 61'		Höler 30'; Knipping 55'	Stadium: Vonovia-Ruhrstadion; Attendance: 13,424; Referee: Manuel Gräfe (Berlin)

24 October 2016 10	1. FC Kaiserslautern	3–0	VfL Bochum	Kaiserslautern
20:15	Osawe 32', 57', 75'			Stadium: Fritz-Walter-Stadion; Attendance: 18,000; Referee: Felix Brych (Munich)

30 October 2016 11	VfL Bochum	2–1	1. FC Heidenheim	Bochum
13:30	Mlapa 6'; Bastians 31' (pen.)		Stiepermann 49' (o.g.)	Stadium: Vonovia-Ruhrstadion; Attendance: 14,729; Referee: Rene Rohde (Rostock)

5 November 2016 12	SpVgg Greuther Fürth	2–1	VfL Bochum	Fürth
13:00	Freis 51'; Sararer 82'		Gündüz 67'	Stadium: Sportpark Ronhof; Attendance: 7,125; Referee: Daniel Schlager (Rastatt)

18 November 2016 13	VfL Bochum	1–1	Eintracht Braunschweig	Bochum
18:30	Quaschner 84'		Kumbela 68'	Stadium: Vonovia-Ruhrstadion; Attendance: 17,488; Referee: Christian Dietz (Kronach)

26 November 2016 14	Dynamo Dresden	2–2	VfL Bochum	Dresden
13:00	Aosman 32'; Kutschke 41'		Wurtz 15'; Mlapa 85'	Stadium: DDV-Stadion; Attendance: 27,372; Referee: Sascha Stegemann (Niederkassel)

4 December 2016 15	Arminia Bielefeld	1–0	VfL Bochum	Bielefeld
13:30	Voglsammer 16'			Stadium: SchücoArena; Attendance: 17,479; Referee: Harm Osmers (Hannover)

10 December 2016 16	VfL Bochum	1–0	TSV 1860 Munich	Bochum
13:00	Canouse 77'			Stadium: Vonovia-Ruhrstadion; Attendance: 15,239; Referee: Benedikt Kempkes (Thür)

17 December 2016 17	FC St. Pauli	1–1	VfL Bochum	Hamburg
13:00	Bouhaddouz 76'		Mlapa 20'	Stadium: Millerntor-Stadion; Attendance: 29,546; Referee: Felix Zwayer (Berlin)

27 January 2017 18	1. FC Union Berlin	2–1	VfL Bochum	Berlin
18:00	Polter 67'; Skrzybski 80'		Hoogland 40'	Stadium: Stadion An der Alten Försterei; Attendance: 19,130; Referee: Patrick Ittrich (Hamburg)

5 February 2017 19	VfL Bochum	1–1	Karlsruher SC	Bochum
13:30	Wurtz 85'		Mugoša 74'	Stadium: Vonovia-Ruhrstadion; Attendance: 15,294; Referee: Bibiana Steinhaus (Langenhagen)

13 February 2017 20	Hannover 96	2–1	VfL Bochum	Hannover
20:15	Harnik 45', 63' (pen.)		Wurtz 16'	Stadium: HDI-Arena; Attendance: 26,000; Referee: Tobias Stieler (Hamburg)

18 February 2017 21	VfL Bochum	2–1	Würzburger Kickers	Bochum
13:00	Weilandt 84'; Wydra 87'		Hoogland 26' (o.g.)	Stadium: Vonovia-Ruhrstadion; Attendance: 11,123; Referee: Robert Kempter (Sauldorf)

26 February 2017 22	1. FC Nürnberg	0–1	VfL Bochum	Nuremberg
13:30			Quaschner 35'	Stadium: Grundig-Stadion; Attendance: 25,700; Referee: Alexander Sather (Grimma)

3 March 2017 23	VfL Bochum	1–2	Fortuna Düsseldorf	Bochum
18:30	Mlapa 43'		Hennings 48'; Bebou 90+3' (pen.)	Stadium: Vonovia-Ruhrstadion; Attendance: 24,556; Referee: Martin Petersen (Stuttgart)

10 March 2017 24	VfB Stuttgart	1–1	VfL Bochum	Stuttgart
18:30	Ginczek 70'		Losilla 10'	Stadium: Mercedes-Benz Arena; Attendance: 45,300; Referee: Benedikt Kempkes (Thür)

19 March 2017 25	VfL Bochum	1–1	FC Erzgebirge Aue	Bochum
13:30	Wurtz 62'		Nazarov 11' (pen.)	Stadium: Vonovia-Ruhrstadion; Attendance: 13,875; Referee: Christian Dietz (Kronach)

1 April 2017 26	SV Sandhausen	0–0	VfL Bochum	Sandhausen
13:00				Stadium: Hardtwaldstadion; Attendance: 5,465; Referee: Sven Jablonski (Bremen)

5 April 2017 27	VfL Bochum	0–0	1. FC Kaiserslautern	Bochum
17:30				Stadium: Vonovia-Ruhrstadion; Attendance: 12,932; Referee: Frank Willenborg (Osnabrück)

8 April 2017 28	1. FC Heidenheim	0–0	VfL Bochum	Heidenheim an der Brenz
13:00				Stadium: Voith-Arena; Attendance: 11,100; Referee: Robert Kempter (Sauldorf)

16 April 2017 29	VfL Bochum	1–0	SpVgg Greuther Fürth	Bochum
13:30	Eisfeld 18'			Stadium: Vonovia-Ruhrstadion; Attendance: 11,465; Referee: Timo Gerach (Landau)

23 April 2017 30	Eintracht Braunschweig	2–0	VfL Bochum	Braunschweig
13:30	Nyman 46', 87'			Stadium: Eintracht-Stadion; Attendance: 21,650; Referee: Florian Badstübner (Windsbach)

28 April 2017 31	VfL Bochum	4–2	Dynamo Dresden	Bochum
18:30	Eisfeld 50'; Stiepermann 51'; Losilla 70'; Sağlam 88'		Hauptmann 7'; Gogia 25'	Stadium: Vonovia-Ruhrstadion; Attendance: 17,264; Referee: Lasse Koslowski (Berlin)

7 May 2017 32	VfL Bochum	1–1	Arminia Bielefeld	Bochum
13:30	Gündüz 82'		Staude 7'	Stadium: Vonovia-Ruhrstadion; Attendance: 18,469; Referee: Benjamin Cortus (Röthenbach)

14 May 2017 33	TSV 1860 Munich	1–2	VfL Bochum	Munich
15:30	Ba 34'		Mlapa 31'; Weilandt 79'	Stadium: Allianz Arena; Attendance: 40,300; Referee: Daniel Schlager (Rastatt)

21 May 2017 34	VfL Bochum	1–3	FC St. Pauli	Bochum
15:30	Gündüz 7'		Thy 3', 86'; Sobiech 55'	Stadium: Vonovia-Ruhrstadion; Attendance: 27,600; Referee: Christof Günsch (Marburg)

=== DFB-Pokal ===
21 August 2016 R1	FC Astoria Walldorf	4–3 (a.e.t.)	VfL Bochum	Walldorf
15:30	Groß 6'; Carl 55'; Meyer 95'; Straub 107'		Stiepermann 22'; Stöger 65', 117'	Stadium: FC-Astoria Stadion; Attendance: 4,000; Referee: Riem Hussein (Bad Harzburg)

== Squad ==
=== Squad and statistics ===
==== Squad, appearances and goals scored ====
As of 21 May 2017

No.	Pos	Nat	Player	Total		2. Bundesliga		DFB-Pokal	
No.	Pos	Nat	Player	Apps	Goals	Apps	Goals	Apps	Goals
1	GK	(Germany) GER	Manuel Riemann	35	0	34	0	1	0
2	MF	(Germany) GER	Tim Hoogland	29	2	28	2	1	0
4	MF	(United States) USA	Russell Canouse (since 6 July 2016)	20	1	20	1	0	0
5	DF	(Germany) GER	Felix Bastians (Vice-Captain)	31	3	30	3	1	0
6	DF	(Austria) AUT	Dominik Wydra	13	1	13	1	0	0
7	FW	(Germany) GER	Selim Gündüz	20	3	20	3	0	0
8	MF	(France) FRA	Anthony Losilla	31	2	30	2	1	0
9	FW	(Germany) GER	Johannes Wurtz	34	8	33	8	1	0
10	MF	(Germany) GER	Thomas Eisfeld	18	3	17	3	1	0
11	FW	(Lithuania) LTU	Arvydas Novikovas (until 13 January 2017)	5	0	5	0	0	0
14	FW	(Germany) GER	Peniel Mlapa	32	8	31	8	1	0
15	FW	(Germany) GER	Cagatay Kader (until 8 July 2016)	0	0	0	0	0	0
15	MF	(Kazakhstan) KAZ	Alexander Merkel (since 15 August 2016)	11	0	11	0	0	0
16	DF	(Germany) GER	Gökhan Gül (until 2 January 2017)	2	0	2	0	0	0
16	MF	(Germany) GER	Ulrich Bapoh (since 16 January 2017)	0	0	0	0	0	0
17	MF	(Germany) GER	Tobias Weis (until 12 August 2016)	0	0	0	0	0	0
17	DF	(Poland) POL	Paweł Dawidowicz (since 12 August 2016)	17	0	17	0	0	0
18	MF	(Germany) GER	Jan Gyamerah	24	1	23	1	1	0
19	DF	(Germany) GER	Patrick Fabian (captain)	3	0	3	0	0	0
20	MF	(Germany) GER	Vitaly Janelt (since 9 January 2017)	7	0	7	0	0	0
21	DF	(Germany) GER	Stefano Celozzi	7	1	6	1	1	0
22	MF	(Austria) AUT	Kevin Stöger	8	3	7	1	1	2
23	FW	(Germany) GER	Tom Weilandt	23	3	22	3	1	0
24	DF	(Germany) GER	Timo Perthel	15	0	14	0	1	0
25	MF	(Germany) GER	Jannik Bandowski (since 31 August 2016)	0	0	0	0	0	0
26	MF	(Germany) GER	Görkem Sağlam	14	1	14	1	0	0
27	DF	(Germany) GER	Nico Rieble	21	0	21	0	0	0
28	MF	(Germany) GER	Tim Krafft	0	0	0	0	0	0
29	DF	(Germany) GER	Maxim Leitsch	2	0	2	0	0	0
30	GK	(Poland) POL	Martin Kompalla	0	0	0	0	0	0
31	DF	(Germany) GER	Tom Baack	0	0	0	0	0	0
32	GK	(Germany) GER	Felix Dornebusch	0	0	0	0	0	0
34	FW	(Greece) GRE	Vangelis Pavlidis	3	0	3	0	0	0
35	MF	(Armenia) ARM	Hayk Galstyan	0	0	0	0	0	0
36	FW	(Germany) GER	Nils Quaschner (since 7 July 2016)	27	3	26	3	1	0
37	DF	(Germany) GER	Moise Ngwisani (since 27 January 2017)	0	0	0	0	0	0
38	GK	(Germany) GER	Florian Kraft	0	0	0	0	0	0
39	MF	(Germany) GER	Marco Stiepermann	32	2	31	1	1	1

=== Transfers ===
As of 27 January 2017

==== Summer ====
In:

No.	Pos.	Nation	Player
4	MF	USA	Russell Canouse (on loan from TSG 1899 Hoffenheim)
6	DF	AUT	Dominik Wydra (from SC Paderborn 07)
9	FW	GER	Johannes Wurtz (from SpVgg Greuther Fürth)
15	MF	KAZ	Alexander Merkel (from (Italy) A.C. Pisa 1909)
17	DF	POL	Paweł Dawidowicz (on loan from (Portugal) S.L. Benfica)
22	MF	AUT	Kevin Stöger (from SC Paderborn 07)
23	FW	GER	Tom Weilandt (from SpVgg Greuther Fürth)
25	MF	GER	Jannik Bandowski (from Borussia Dortmund)
27	DF	GER	Nico Rieble (from TSG 1899 Hoffenheim II)
28	MF	GER	Tim Krafft (from VfL Bochum U-19)
29	DF	GER	Maxim Leitsch (from VfL Bochum U-19)
30	GK	POL	Martin Kompalla (from Borussia Mönchengladbach II)
35	MF	ARM	Hayk Galstyan (from VfL Bochum U-19)
36	FW	GER	Nils Quaschner (on loan from RB Leipzig)
38	GK	GER	Florian Kraft (from VfL Bochum U-19)
39	MF	GER	Marco Stiepermann (from SpVgg Greuther Fürth)

Out:

No.	Pos.	Nation	Player
1	GK	GER	Andreas Luthe (to FC Augsburg)
3	DF	NED	Giliano Wijnaldum (released)
4	DF	GER	Malcolm Cacutalua (loan return to Bayer 04 Leverkusen)
6	DF	CZE	Jan Šimůnek (to (Czech Republic) FK Dukla Prague)
9	FW	ANG	Nando Rafael (released)
10	MF	GER	Marco Terrazzino (to TSG 1899 Hoffenheim)
15	FW	GER	Cagatay Kader (to FSV Frankfurt)
17	MF	GER	Tobias Weis (released)
20	MF	POL	Piotr Ćwielong (to (Poland) Ruch Chorzów)
22	FW	GER	Simon Terodde (to VfB Stuttgart)
23	FW	GER	Janik Haberer (loan return to TSG 1899 Hoffenheim)
25	MF	TUR	Onur Bulut (to SC Freiburg)
27	MF	CUW	Michaël Maria (released)
28	DF	GER	Frederik Lach (to VfB Oldenburg)
30	DF	POL	David Niepsuj (to (Poland) Pogoń Szczecin)
35	MF	GER	Roman Zengin (to 1. FC Köln II)

==== Winter ====
In:

No.	Pos.	Nation	Player
16	MF	GER	Ulrich Bapoh (from VfL Bochum U-19)
20	MF	GER	Vitaly Janelt (on loan from RB Leipzig)
37	DF	GER	Moise Ngwisani (from VfL Bochum U-19)

Out:

No.	Pos.	Nation	Player
11	FW	LTU	Arvydas Novikovas (to (Poland) Jagiellonia Białystok)
16	DF	GER	Gökhan Gül (to Fortuna Düsseldorf)
