= 2017–18 VfL Bochum season =

VfL Bochum
2017–18 season
- Chairman: Hans-Peter Villis
- Manager: Gertjan Verbeek (until 11 July 2017); Ismail Atalan (until 9 October 2017) Jens Rasiejewski (ad interim, until 8 December 2017; manager until 7 February 2018); Heiko Butscher (ad interim, until 11 February 2018); Robin Dutt (since 11 February 2018)
- Stadium: Vonovia-Ruhrstadion
- 2. Bundesliga: 6th
- DFB-Pokal: Second Round
- Top goalscorer: League: Hinterseer (14); All: Hinterseer (17)
- Highest home attendance: 27,599 (vs Fortuna Düsseldorf, 30 October 2017)
- Lowest home attendance: 11,228 (vs SpVgg Greuther Fürth, 18 November 2017)
- Average home league attendance: 16,738

The 2017–18 VfL Bochum season is the 80th season in club history.

== Review and events ==
On 11 July 2017 head coach Gertjan Verbeek was sacked and replaced by Ismail Atalan. On 9 October 2017 head coach Ismail Atalan was sacked and replaced by caretaker Jens Rasiejewski. Rasiejewski's tenure as caretaker ended on 8 December 2017, when he was appointed as head coach by athletic director Christian Hochstätter. On 7 February 2018 the supervisory board sacked both Christian Hochstätter and Jens Rasiejewski. Heiko Butscher took over as caretaker. On 11 February 2018 the VfL Bochum announced signing Robin Dutt as head coach.

== Matches ==
=== Legend ===
Win Draw Loss

=== Friendly matches ===
21 June 2017 Friendly	BW Grümerbaum	0–21	VfL Bochum	Bochum
18:30			Wurtz 4', 11', 20', 36'; Eisfeld 13', 30', 32'; Hinterseer 40'; Celozzi 47'; Bapoh 50'; Diamantakos 53', 64', 65', 66', 73', 76'; Stöger 62', 70'; Bandowski 79', 83'; Canouse 80'	Stadium: Bezirkssportanlage Grümerbaum; Attendance: 1,000

24 June 2017 Friendly	CSV Sportfreunde Bochum-Linden	0–9	VfL Bochum	Bochum
16:00			Diamantakos 13'; Wurtz 18', 42'; Gündüz 45'; Hinterseer 56'; Bastians 60'; Weilandt 63', 73'; Bapoh 65'	Stadium: Sportanlage In-der-Hei

28 June 2017 Friendly	TuS Querenburg	0–23	VfL Bochum	Bochum
18:30			Hinterseer 8', 29', 45'; Stiepermann 9', 22', 23'; Diamantakos 13', 31', 32'; Soares 17'; Losilla 26'; Eisfeld 40'; Mlapa 51', 65', 67'; Weilandt 54', 80'; Stöger 55', 60', 78'; Leitsch 77'; Wurtz 82', 84'	Stadium: Rasenplatz an der Westerholtstraße

1 July 2017 Friendly	FC Shakhtar Donetsk	2–0	VfL Bochum	Dülmen
16:30	Rakitskiy 15'; Dentinho 43'			Stadium: TSG Stadion

5 July 2017 Friendly	VfL Bochum	1–2	R. Charleroi S.C.	Vaals, Netherlands
15:00	Eisfeld 42'		Fainmont 9'; Bedia 61'	Stadium: Sportcomplex Molenveld; Attendance: 0

8 July 2017 Friendly	VfL Bochum	0–0	Royale Union Saint-Gilloise	Vaals, Netherlands
13:00				Stadium: Sportcomplex Molenveld

12 July 2017 Friendly	SG Wattenscheid 09	1–6	VfL Bochum	Bochum
18:30	Langer 34'		Diamantakos 17'; Celozzi 23'; Wurtz 67'; Merkel 75'; Soares 78'; Sağlam 89'	Stadium: Lohrheidestadion; Attendance: 2,500

15 July 2017 Friendly	FC Carl Zeiss Jena	2–5	VfL Bochum	Gera
16:00	Thiele 64'; Wolfram 67'		Mlapa 21'; Hoogland 36'; Wurtz 57', 62'; Weilandt 77'	Stadium: Stadion der Freundschaft; Attendance: 1,321; Referee: Daniel Siebert (Berlin)

16 July 2017 Friendly	FC Rot-Weiß Erfurt	0–6	VfL Bochum	Gotha
15:30			Diamantakos 20'; Hoogland 22'; Eisfeld 28', 37'; Merkel 47'; Sağlam 69'	Stadium: Volksparkstadion; Attendance: 1,382; Referee: Florian Heft (Wietmarschen)

22 July 2017 Friendly	VfL Bochum	2–2	Borussia Dortmund	Bochum
18:00	Celozzi 38'; Losilla 55'		Castro 85'; Pulisic 86'	Stadium: Vonovia-Ruhrstadion; Attendance: 24,000; Referee: Sören Storks (Velen)

31 August 2017 Friendly	Bayer 04 Leverkusen	1–2	VfL Bochum	Leverkusen
15:00	Frey 70'		Wurtz 3', 19'	Stadium: Ulrich-Haberland-Stadion

3 October 2017 Friendly	DJK TuS Hordel	2–7	VfL Bochum	Bochum
15:00	van der Heusen 60'; Shirakawa 76'		Maas 20' (o.g.); Gyamerah 28'; Hinterseer 31'; Fabian 35'; Wurtz 78'; Gündüz 83'; Eisfeld 85'	Stadium: Erbstollen-Arena; Attendance: 700

8 November 2017 Friendly	Borussia Dortmund	4–2	VfL Bochum	Dortmund
11:30	Philipp 8'; Schürrle 48', 62'; Aubameyang 57' (pen.)		Hinterseer 14'; Wurtz 22'	Stadium: Dortmunder Trainingsgelände; Attendance: 0 Referee: Marcel Neuer (Gelsenkirchen)

8 November 2017 Friendly	VfL Bochum	18–0	Sportfreunde Westenfeld	Bochum
18:00	Tomas 9', 42'; Tesche 10', 25', 34', 59'; Hemmerich 11', 18', 27'; Stöger 11'; Merkel 32', 60'; Gucciardo 54', 57', 87'; Fraundörfer 68'; Pavlidis 77'; Ekincier 83'			Stadium: Nachwuchsleistungszentrum Hiltroper Straße; Referee: Jens Jeromin (Bochum)

11 November 2017 Friendly	Helmond Sport	0–0	VfL Bochum	Helmond, Netherlands
13:00				Stadium: Lavans-Stadion

10 January 2018 Friendly	CD Atlético Baleares	2–4	VfL Bochum	Llucmajor, Spain
	15'; 68'		Tesche 14'; Kruse 52'; Bastians 58' (pen.); Wurtz 62'	Stadium: Sports Facilities Hotel Hilton Sa Torre

17 January 2018 Friendly	FC St. Pauli	1–1	VfL Bochum	Hamburg
18:00	Allagui 12'		Wurtz 20'	Stadium: Millerntor-Stadion; Attendance: 2,823; Referee: Patrick Ittrich (Hamburg)

20 January 2018 Friendly	Alemannia Aachen	1–0	VfL Bochum	Aachen
14:00	Heinze 82'			Stadium: Tivoli; Attendance: 1,150; Referee: Andreas Steffens (Mechernich)

22 March 2018 Friendly	Bayer 04 Leverkusen	5–2	VfL Bochum	Cologne
15:00	Volland 11', 39'; Bukusu 16'; Alario 34', 70'		Wurtz 21'; Stöger 87'	Stadium: Am Kurtekotten

=== 2. Bundesliga ===
==== League table ====
Pos	Team	Pld	W	D	L	GF	GA	GD	Pts
4	Arminia Bielefeld	34	12	12	10	51	47	+4	48
5	Jahn Regensburg	34	14	6	14	53	53	0	48
6	VfL Bochum	34	13	9	12	37	40	−3	48
7	MSV Duisburg	34	13	9	12	52	56	−4	48
8	Union Berlin	34	12	11	11	54	46	+8	47

Source: DFB
Rules for classification: 1) Points; 2) Goal difference; 3) Goals scored

==== Results summary ====
Overall								Home						Away					
Pld	W	D	L	GF	GA	GD	Pts	W	D	L	GF	GA	GD	W	D	L	GF	GA	GD
34	13	9	12	37	40	−3	48	8	5	4	22	16	+6	5	4	8	15	24	−9

==== Results by round ====
Round	1	2	3	4	5	6	7	8	9	10	11	12	13	14	15	16	17	18	19	20	21	22	23	24	25	26	27	28	29	30	31	32	33	34
Ground	H	A	A	H	A	H	A	H	A	H	A	H	A	H	A	H	A	A	H	H	A	H	A	H	A	H	A	H	A	H	A	H	A	H
Result	L	D	L	W	W	L	L	W	L	W	L	D	D	D	D	W	W	L	L	L	L	W	L	D	W	D	W	W	W	W	D	W	L	D
Position	14	12	15	12	12	12	14	11	13	11	13	13	14	14	15	13	9	12	13	14	14	14	14	15	14	15	13	8	7	6	6	6	6	6

A = Away; H = Home; W = Win; D = Draw; L = Loss

==== Matches ====
28 July 2017 1	VfL Bochum	0–1	FC St. Pauli	Bochum
20:30			Buchtmann 65'	Stadium: Vonovia-Ruhrstadion; Attendance: 27,350; Referee: Bastian Dankert (Rostock)

5 August 2017 2	MSV Duisburg	1–1	VfL Bochum	Duisburg
13:00	Tashchy 7'		Bandowski 47'	Stadium: Schauinsland-Reisen-Arena; Attendance: 22,893; Referee: Martin Petersen (Stuttgart)

21 August 2017 3	Arminia Bielefeld	2–0	VfL Bochum	Bielefeld
20:30	Voglsammer 22'; Kerschbaumer 35'			Stadium: SchücoArena; Attendance: 20,663; Referee: Daniel Schlager (Rastatt)

27 August 2017 4	VfL Bochum	3–2	Dynamo Dresden	Bochum
13:30	Bastians 16', 27' (pen.); Hinterseer 88'		Heise 11'; Aosman 77'	Stadium: Vonovia-Ruhrstadion; Attendance: 14,808; Referee: Bibiana Steinhaus (Langenhagen)

10 September 2017 5	SV Darmstadt 98	1–2	VfL Bochum	Darmstadt
13:30	Sulu 24'		Diamantakos 81'; Kruse 86'	Stadium: Jonathan-Heimes-Stadion am Böllenfalltor; Attendance: 16,000; Referee: Benedikt Kempkes (Thür)

17 September 2017 6	VfL Bochum	1–2	1. FC Heidenheim	Bochum
13:30	Kruse 13'		Glatzel 16'; Wittek 73'	Stadium: Vonovia-Ruhrstadion; Attendance: 13,236; Referee: Lasse Koslowski (Berlin)

21 September 2017 7	1. FC Nuremberg	3–1	VfL Bochum	Nuremberg
20:30	Löwen 28'; Behrens 52'; Ishak 86'		Diamantakos 13' (pen.)	Stadium: Grundig-Stadion; Attendance: 21,872; Referee: Florian Heft (Wietmarschen)

24 September 2017 8	VfL Bochum	2–0	FC Ingolstadt 04	Bochum
13:30	Bastians 24'; Kruse 27'			Stadium: Vonovia-Ruhrstadion; Attendance: 11,251; Referee: Daniel Schlager (Rastatt)

30 September 2017 9	Holstein Kiel	3–0	VfL Bochum	Kiel
13:00	Riemann 22' (o.g.); Czichos 42'; Drexler 68'			Stadium: Holstein-Stadion; Attendance: 10,500; Referee: Patrick Alt (Heusweiler)

14 October 2017 10	VfL Bochum	2–0	SV Sandhausen	Bochum
13:00	Hinterseer 12'; Stöger 72'			Stadium: Vonovia-Ruhrstadion; Attendance: 13,548; Referee: Christian Dietz (Kronach)

21 October 2017 11	Eintracht Braunschweig	1–0	VfL Bochum	Braunschweig
13:00	Yıldırım 7'			Stadium: Eintracht-Stadion; Attendance: 19,790; Referee: Martin Thomsen (Kleve)

30 October 2017 12	VfL Bochum	0–0	Fortuna Düsseldorf	Bochum
20:30				Stadium: Vonovia-Ruhrstadion; Attendance: 27,599; Referee: Benjamin Cortus (Röthenbach)

3 November 2017 13	1. FC Kaiserslautern	0–0	VfL Bochum	Kaiserslautern
18:30				Stadium: Fritz-Walter-Stadion; Attendance: 19,086; Referee: Alexander Sather (Grimma)

18 November 2017 14	VfL Bochum	1–1	SpVgg Greuther Fürth	Bochum
13:00	Hinterseer 17'		Caligiuri 7'	Stadium: Vonovia-Ruhrstadion; Attendance: 11,228; Referee: Guido Winkmann (Kerken)

26 November 2017 15	FC Erzgebirge Aue	1–1	VfL Bochum	Aue
13:30	Fandrich 4'		Bastians 39'	Stadium: Sparkassen-Erzgebirgsstadion; Attendance: 7,200; Referee: Robert Schröder (Hannover)

3 December 2017 16	VfL Bochum	2–1	1. FC Union Berlin	Bochum
13:30	Stöger 40'; Hinterseer 87'		Polter 4'	Stadium: Vonovia-Ruhrstadion; Attendance: 13,119; Referee: Matthias Jöllenbeck (Freiburg)

9 December 2017 17	SSV Jahn Regensburg	0–1	VfL Bochum	Regensburg
13:00			Kruse 7'	Stadium: Continental Arena; Attendance: 7,285; Referee: Martin Thomsen (Kleve)

18 December 2017 18	FC St. Pauli	2–1	VfL Bochum	Hamburg
20:30	Sobiech 34'; Schneider 49'		Hinterseer 75'	Stadium: Millerntor-Stadion; Attendance: 29,005; Referee: Bibiana Steinhaus (Langenhagen)

23 January 2018 19	VfL Bochum	0–2	MSV Duisburg	Bochum
18:30			Iljutcenko 40'; Wolze 45+1' (pen.)	Stadium: Vonovia-Ruhrstadion; Attendance: 17,564; Referee: Benjamin Cortus (Röthenbach)

29 January 2018 20	VfL Bochum	0–1	Arminia Bielefeld	Bochum
20:30			Hartherz 68'	Stadium: Vonovia-Ruhrstadion; Attendance: 12,417; Referee: Robert Hartmann (Wangen

4 February 2018 21	Dynamo Dresden	2–0	VfL Bochum	Dresden
13:30	Röser 2' (pen.); Koné 89'			Stadium: DDV-Stadion; Attendance: 24,097; Referee: Christian Dietz (Munich)

9 February 2018 22	VfL Bochum	2–1	SV Darmstadt 98	Bochum
18:30	Hinterseer 66'; Holland 69' (o.g.)		Brégerie 61'	Stadium: Vonovia-Ruhrstadion; Attendance: 14,520; Referee: René Rohde (Rostock)

16 February 2018 23	1. FC Heidenheim	1–0	VfL Bochum	Heidenheim an der Brenz
18:30	Verhoek 23'			Stadium: Voith-Arena; Attendance: 10,000; Referee: Robert Kempter (Sauldorf)

25 February 2018 24	VfL Bochum	0–0	1. FC Nuremberg	Bochum
13:30				Stadium: Vonovia-Ruhrstadion; Attendance: 14,016; Referee: Lasse Koslowski (Berlin)

5 March 2018 25	FC Ingolstadt 04	0–1	VfL Bochum	Ingolstadt
20:30			Tesche 32'	Stadium: Audi Sportpark; Attendance: 7,934; Referee: Tobias Stieler (Obertshausen)

10 March 2018 26	VfL Bochum	1–1	Holstein Kiel	Bochum
13:00	Stöger 8'		Ducksch 61'	Stadium: Vonovia-Ruhrstadion; Attendance: 14,939; Referee: Florian Badstübner (Windsbach)

17 March 2018 27	SV Sandhausen	2–3	VfL Bochum	Sandhausen
13:00	Stiefler 18'; Gíslason 24'		Hinterseer 26', 56', 64'	Stadium: Hardtwaldstadion; Attendance: 6,526; Referee: Christian Dietz (Munich)

1 April 2018 28	VfL Bochum	2–0	Eintracht Braunschweig	Bochum
13:30	Hinterseer 24', 82'			Stadium: Vonovia-Ruhrstadion; Attendance: 14,976; Referee: Tobias Welz (Wiesbaden)

6 April 2018 29	Fortuna Düsseldorf	1–2	VfL Bochum	Düsseldorf
18:30	Hennings 80' (pen.)		Eisfeld 70'; Kruse 75'	Stadium: Esprit Arena; Attendance: 35,600; Referee: Felix Zwayer (Berlin)

13 April 2018 30	VfL Bochum	3–2	1. FC Kaiserslautern	Bochum
18:30	Hinterseer 18'; Osawe 27' (o.g.); Stöger 81'		Altıntop 7'; Vučur 48'	Stadium: Vonovia-Ruhrstadion; Attendance: 23,042; Referee: Bastian Dankert (Rostock)

20 April 2018 31	SpVgg Greuther Fürth	1–1	VfL Bochum	Fürth
18:30	Dursun 27'		Hinterseer 82'	Stadium: Sportpark Ronhof; Attendance: 8,820; Referee: Robert Kempter (Sauldorf)

27 April 2018 32	VfL Bochum	2–1	FC Erzgebirge Aue	Bochum
18:30	Kruse 3', 77'		Köpke 16'	Stadium: Vonovia-Ruhrstadion; Attendance: 20,121; Referee: Daniel Schlager (Rastatt)

6 May 2018 33	1. FC Union Berlin	3–1	VfL Bochum	Berlin
15:30	Redondo 45'; Soares 47' (o.g.); Skrzybski 90+1'		Hinterseer 87'	Stadium: Stadion An der Alten Försterei; Attendance: 22,012; Referee: Robert Schröder (Hannover)

13 May 2018 34	VfL Bochum	1–1	SSV Jahn Regensburg	Bochum
15:30	Wurtz 87'		Grüttner 64'	Stadium: Vonovia-Ruhrstadion; Attendance: 20,811; Referee: Patrick Alt (Heusweiler)

=== DFB-Pokal ===
13 August 2017 R1	FC Nöttingen	2–5	VfL Bochum	Karlsruhe
15:30	Brenner 51' (pen.); Bilger 85'		Sağlam 1'; Hinterseer 3', 65', 74'; Bandowski 87'	Stadium: Wildparkstadion; Attendance: 2,700; Referee: Robert Schröder (Hannover)

24 October 2017 R2	SC Paderborn 07	2–0	VfL Bochum	Paderborn
18:30	Michel 7'; Wassey 85'			Stadium: Benteler-Arena; Attendance: 15,000; Referee: Sascha Stegemann (Niederkassel)

== Squad ==
=== Squad and statistics ===
==== Squad, appearances and goals scored ====
As of 13 May 2018

No.	Pos	Nat	Player	Total		2. Bundesliga		DFB-Pokal	
No.	Pos	Nat	Player	Apps	Goals	Apps	Goals	Apps	Goals
1	GK	(Germany) GER	Manuel Riemann	27	0	26	0	1	0
2	MF	(Germany) GER	Tim Hoogland	27	0	26	0	1	0
3	DF	(Brazil) BRA	Danilo Soares	32	0	30	0	2	0
4	MF	(United States) USA	Russell Canouse (until 10 August 2017)	0	0	0	0	0	0
4	DF	(Germany) GER	Simon Lorenz (since 31 January 2018)	0	0	0	0	0	0
5	DF	(Germany) GER	Felix Bastians (captain until 9 October 2017, until 26 January 2018)	18	4	16	4	2	0
6	MF	(Austria) AUT	Dominik Wydra (until 5 July 2017)	0	0	0	0	0	0
6	DF	(Germany) GER	Luke Hemmerich (since 28 August 2017)	8	0	7	0	1	0
7	FW	(Germany) GER	Selim Gündüz	18	0	17	0	1	0
8	MF	(France) FRA	Anthony Losilla	32	0	31	0	1	0
9	FW	(Germany) GER	Johannes Wurtz	29	1	27	1	2	0
10	MF	(Germany) GER	Thomas Eisfeld	19	1	18	1	1	0
11	FW	(Greece) GRE	Dimitrios Diamantakos (until 25 January 2018)	10	2	9	2	1	0
11	FW	(Germany) GER	Janni Serra (since 26 January 2018)	12	0	12	0	0	0
13	FW	(Germany) GER	Sidney Sam (since 31 August 2017)	24	0	23	0	1	0
14	FW	(Togo) TOG	Peniel Mlapa (until 31 August 2017)	2	0	2	0	0	0
14	MF	(Germany) GER	Philipp Ochs (since 5 January 2018)	5	0	5	0	0	0
15	MF	(Kazakhstan) KAZ	Alexander Merkel (until 5 February 2018)	3	0	2	0	1	0
16	FW	(Austria) AUT	Lukas Hinterseer	33	17	31	14	2	3
17	FW	(Australia) AUS	Robbie Kruse (since 21 July 2017)	31	7	30	7	1	0
18	DF	(Germany) GER	Jan Gyamerah	25	0	24	0	1	0
19	DF	(Germany) GER	Patrick Fabian	23	0	21	0	2	0
20	MF	(Germany) GER	Vitaly Janelt	13	0	13	0	0	0
21	DF	(Germany) GER	Stefano Celozzi (captain since 9 October 2017)	27	0	26	0	1	0
22	MF	(Austria) AUT	Kevin Stöger	32	4	30	4	2	0
23	MF	(Germany) GER	Tom Weilandt (until 14 August 2017)	0	0	0	0	0	0
23	MF	(Germany) GER	Robert Tesche (since 31 August 2017)	18	1	18	1	0	0
24	DF	(Germany) GER	Timo Perthel	0	0	0	0	0	0
25	MF	(Germany) GER	Jannik Bandowski	7	2	6	1	1	1
26	MF	(Germany) GER	Görkem Sağlam	5	1	4	0	1	1
27	DF	(Germany) GER	Nico Rieble (until 29 January 2018)	0	0	0	0	0	0
28	MF	(Germany) GER	Ulrich Bapoh	0	0	0	0	0	0
29	DF	(Germany) GER	Maxim Leitsch	11	0	10	0	1	0
30	GK	(Poland) POL	Martin Kompalla	0	0	0	0	0	0
31	MF	(Germany) GER	Tom Baack	0	0	0	0	0	0
32	GK	(Germany) GER	Felix Dornebusch	10	0	9	0	1	0
34	MF	(Greece) GRE	Vangelis Pavlidis (until 26 January 2018)	0	0	0	0	0	0
35	MF	(Armenia) ARM	Hayk Galstyan (until 3 July 2017)	0	0	0	0	0	0
37	MF	(Germany) GER	Julian Tomas	0	0	0	0	0	0
38	GK	(Germany) GER	Florian Kraft	0	0	0	0	0	0
39	MF	(Germany) GER	Marco Stiepermann (until 6 August 2017)	0	0	0	0	0	0
42	MF	(Azerbaijan) AZE	Baris Ekincier (since 31 August 2017)	0	0	0	0	0	0

=== Transfers ===
As of 5 February 2018

==== Summer ====
In:

No.	Pos.	Nation	Player
3	DF	BRA	Danilo Soares (from TSG 1899 Hoffenheim)
6	DF	GER	Luke Hemmerich (on loan from FC Schalke 04)
11	FW	GRE	Dimitrios Diamantakos (from Karlsruher SC)
13	FW	GER	Sidney Sam (from FC Schalke 04)
16	FW	AUT	Lukas Hinterseer (from FC Ingolstadt 04)
17	FW	AUS	Robbie Kruse (free agent)
23	MF	GER	Robert Tesche (on loan from (England) Birmingham City F.C.)
37	MF	GER	Julian Tomas (from TSG 1899 Hoffenheim U19)

Out:

No.	Pos.	Nation	Player
4	MF	USA	Russell Canouse (loan return to TSG 1899 Hoffenheim)
6	MF	AUT	Dominik Wydra (to FC Erzgebirge Aue)
14	FW	TOG	Peniel Mlapa (to Dynamo Dresden)
17	DF	POL	Paweł Dawidowicz (loan return to (Portugal) S.L. Benfica)
23	MF	GER	Tom Weilandt (on loan to Holstein Kiel)
28	MF	GER	Tim Krafft (to Fortuna Düsseldorf II)
35	MF	ARM	Hayk Galstyan (to VfB Stuttgart II)
36	FW	GER	Nils Quaschner (loan return to RB Leipzig)
37	DF	GER	Moise Ngwisani (to FC Erzgebirge Aue)
39	MF	GER	Marco Stiepermann (to (England) Norwich City F.C.)

==== Winter ====
In:

No.	Pos.	Nation	Player
4	DF	GER	Simon Lorenz (from TSG 1899 Hoffenheim)
11	FW	GER	Janni Serra (on loan from Borussia Dortmund II)
14	MF	GER	Philipp Ochs (on loan from TSG 1899 Hoffenheim)

Out:

No.	Pos.	Nation	Player
5	DF	GER	Felix Bastians (to (China) Tianjin TEDA F.C.)
11	FW	GRE	Dimitrios Diamantakos (to FC St. Pauli)
15	MF	KAZ	Alexander Merkel (to (Austria) FC Admira Wacker Mödling)
27	DF	GER	Nico Rieble (to FC Hansa Rostock)
34	MF	GRE	Vangelis Pavlidis (on loan to Borussia Dortmund II)
