= Peniel Mlapa =

Togolese footballer (born 1991)

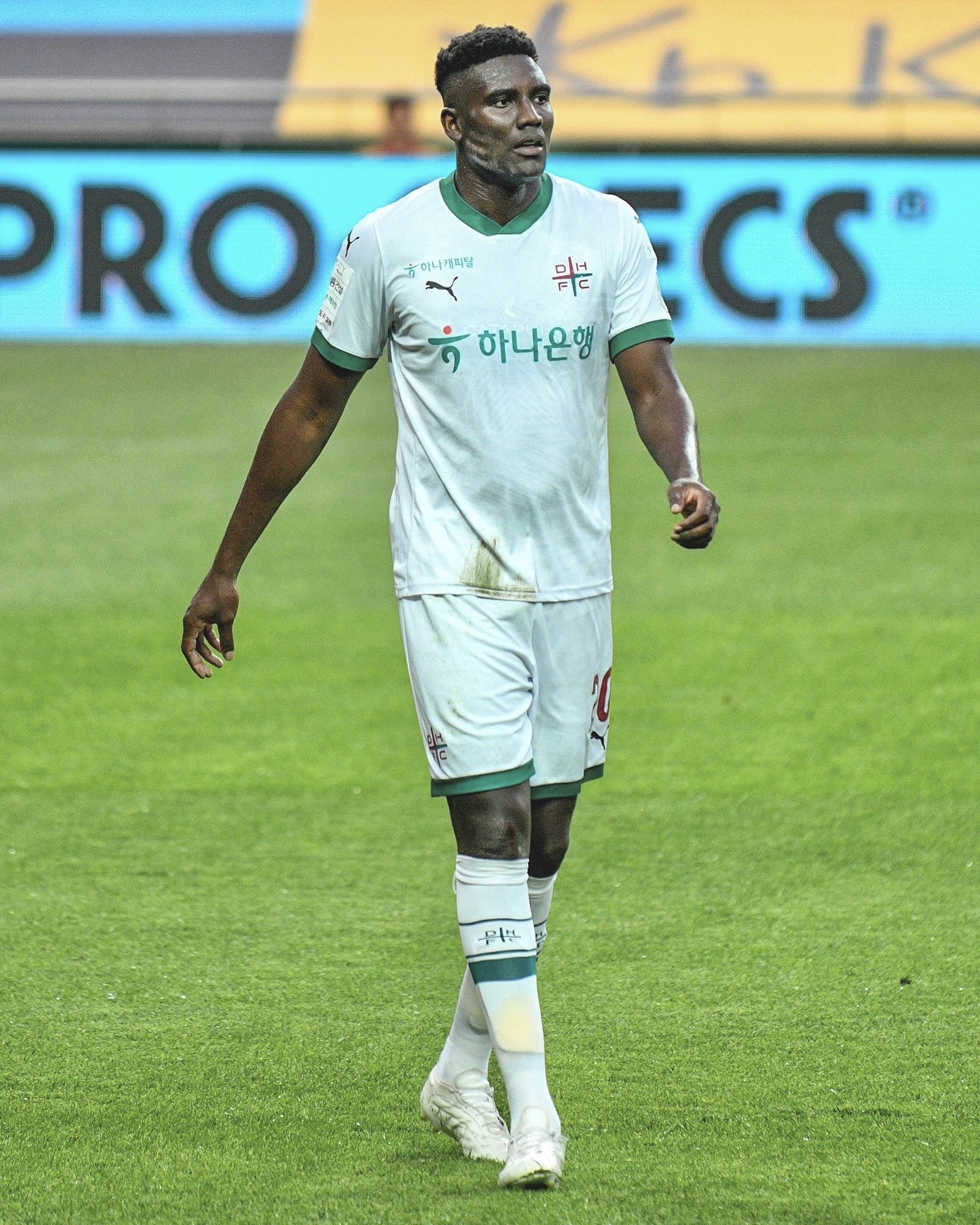
- Mlapa in 2024

Personal information
- Full name: Peniel Kokou Mlapa
- Date of birth: 20 February 1991 (age 35)
- Place of birth: Lomé, Togo
- Height: 1.93 m (6 ft 4 in)
- Position: Striker

Team information
- Current team: Lamphun Warriors
- Number: 18

Youth career
- –1999: FC Unterföhring
- 1999–2009: 1860 Munich

Senior career*
Years	Team	Apps	(Gls)
2008–2010	1860 Munich II	13	(5)
2009–2010	1860 Munich	23	(6)
2010–2012	1899 Hoffenheim	54	(5)
2011–2012	→ 1899 Hoffenheim II	3	(0)
2012–2015	Borussia Mönchengladbach	25	(3)
2012–2013	→ Borussia Mönchengladbach II	6	(1)
2014–2015	→ 1. FC Nürnberg (loan)	24	(3)
2015–2017	VfL Bochum	62	(13)
2017–2019	Dynamo Dresden	21	(4)
2018–2019	→ VVV-Venlo (loan)	30	(15)
2019–2023	Ittihad Kalba	69	(31)
2023	Al Nasr	12	(1)
2024	Daejeon Hana Citizen	16	(4)
2024	Busan IPark	14	(4)
2025	Port	9	(1)
2025–	Lamphun Warriors	13	(1)

International career^{‡}
2009–2010	Germany U19	10	(1)
2010–2013	Germany U21	21	(8)
2017–2020	Togo	15	(0)
- * Club domestic league appearances and goals as of 17:46, 18 February 2026 (UTC) ‡ National team caps and goals as of 17 November 2020

Peniel Kokou Mlapa (born 20 February 1991) is a Togolese professional footballer who plays as a striker for Thai League 1 club Lamphun Warriors.

== Club career ==
=== Early life and career ===
Born in Lomé, Togo, Mlapa emigrated to Germany as a young child. He began his youth career with FC Ismaning, but in 1999, he moved to TSV 1860 Munich. He made his debut for 1860's U19 team on 12 September 2008 against 1. FC Heidenheim. Over the 2008–09 season, he made two appearances as a substitute for 1860's reserve side, both of which came in victories, but he remained a regular for the U19s.

=== 1860 Munich ===
On 17 May 2009, Mlapa made his debut in professional football as a stoppage time substitute against Alemannia Aachen He scored his first senior goal for 1860 on 4 October against St. Paul. In the next game against MSV Duisburg, Mlapa appeared in the starting lineup for the first time and scored again.

=== 1899 Hoffenheim ===
In the summer of 2010, Mlapa joined the Bundesliga side Hoffenheim, signing a contract through 2013. He scored his first goal for the club in the DFB-Pokal against Hansa Rostock. In all, Mlapa scored five times in 54 Bundesliga games for TSG 1899 Hoffenheim.

=== Borussia Mönchengladbach ===
In May 2012, Mlapa joined Borussia Mönchengladbach for €3 million. The striker signed a four-year contract.

=== Daejeon Hana Citizen ===
In March 2024, Mlapa joined K League 1 club Daejeon Hana Citizen.

=== Port FC ===
Mlapa joined Thai League 1 club Port F.C. in the January 2025 transfer window. He made his debut on January 24th as a second half substitute for Lonsana Doumbouya in the 3-3 home draw against Ratchaburi FC, scoring an 84th minute penalty to register his first goal for the club.

== International career ==
On 7 October 2009, Mlapa made his debut for the German under-19s as a 90th-minute substitute against Luxembourg. A few weeks later, he was called up to represent Togo in their final world cup qualifier, but he declined this invitation and progressed to the German under-21 squad.

He finally accepted a call-up to the Togo national team for 2017 AFCON qualifiers against Tunisia in March 2016. On 1 June 2017, he made his debut with the Togolese national team, in a 3–0 defeat against Nigeria.

== Personal life ==
The Togolese-born Mlapa acquired German citizenship in his childhood, thus becoming eligible for his adopted home country's national side.

== Career statistics ==
As of match played 30 April 2025

Appearances and goals by club, season and competition
Club	Season	League			National Cup		League Cup		Continental		Total	
Club	Season	Division	Apps	Goals	Apps	Goals	Apps	Goals	Apps	Goals	Apps	Goals
TSV 1860 Munich II	2008–09	Regionalliga Süd	3	0	—		—		—		3	0
TSV 1860 Munich II	2009–10	Regionalliga Süd	10	5	—		—		—		10	5
TSV 1860 Munich II	Total		13	5	—		0	0	0	0	13	5
1860 Munich	2008–09	2. Bundesliga	2	0	0	0	—		—		2	0
1860 Munich	2009–10	2. Bundesliga	21	6	2	0	—		—		23	6
1860 Munich	Total		23	6	2	0	0	0	0	0	25	6
1899 Hoffenheim	2010–11	Bundesliga	30	4	4	1	—		—		34	5
1899 Hoffenheim	2011–12	Bundesliga	24	1	4	0	—		—		28	1
1899 Hoffenheim	Total		54	5	8	1	0	0	0	0	62	6
1899 Hoffenheim II	2011–12	Regionalliga Süd	3	0	—		—		—		3	0
Borussia Mönchengladbach	2012–13	Bundesliga	20	2	1	0	—		5 (Note: Appearances in the Europa League)	1	26	3
Borussia Mönchengladbach	2013–14	Bundesliga	5	1	0	0	—		—		5	1
Borussia Mönchengladbach	Total		25	3	1	0	0	0	5	1	31	4
Borussia Mönchengladbach II	2012–13	Regionalliga West	4	0	—		—		—		4	0
Borussia Mönchengladbach II	2013–14	Regionalliga West	2	1	—		—		—		2	1
Borussia Mönchengladbach II	Total		6	1	—		0	0	0	0	6	1
1. FC Nürnberg	2014–15	2. Bundesliga	24	3	1	0	—		—		25	3
VfL Bochum	2015–16	2. Bundesliga	28	5	3	0	—		—		31	5
VfL Bochum	2016–17	2. Bundesliga	32	8	1	0	—		—		33	8
VfL Bochum	2017–18	2. Bundesliga	2	0	0	0	—		—		2	0
VfL Bochum	Total		62	13	4	0	0	0	0	0	35	13
Dynamo Dresden	2017–18	2. Bundesliga	21	4	1	0	—		—		22	4
VVV-Venlo	2018–19	Eredivisie	30	15	1	0	—		—		31	15
Ittihad Kalba	2019–20	UPL	18	11	6	5	—		—		24	16
Ittihad Kalba	2020–21	UPL	22	12	6	5	—		—		28	17
Ittihad Kalba	2021–22	UPL	20	8	5	1	—		—		25	9
Ittihad Kalba	2022–23	UPL	9	0	3	2	—		—		12	2
Ittihad Kalba	Total		69	31	20	13	0	0	0	0	89	44
Al-Nasr	2022–23	UPL	12	1	3	0	—		—		15	1
Daejeon	2024	K League 1	16	4	2	1	—		—		18	3
Busan	2024	K League 2	14	4	1	0	—		—		15	4
Port	2024-25	Thai League 1	9	1	0	0	1	1	2 (Note: Appearances in AFC Champions League Two)	0	12	2
Career total			381	96	44	15	1	1	7	1	432	111
