= Vitaly Janelt =

German footballer (born 1998)

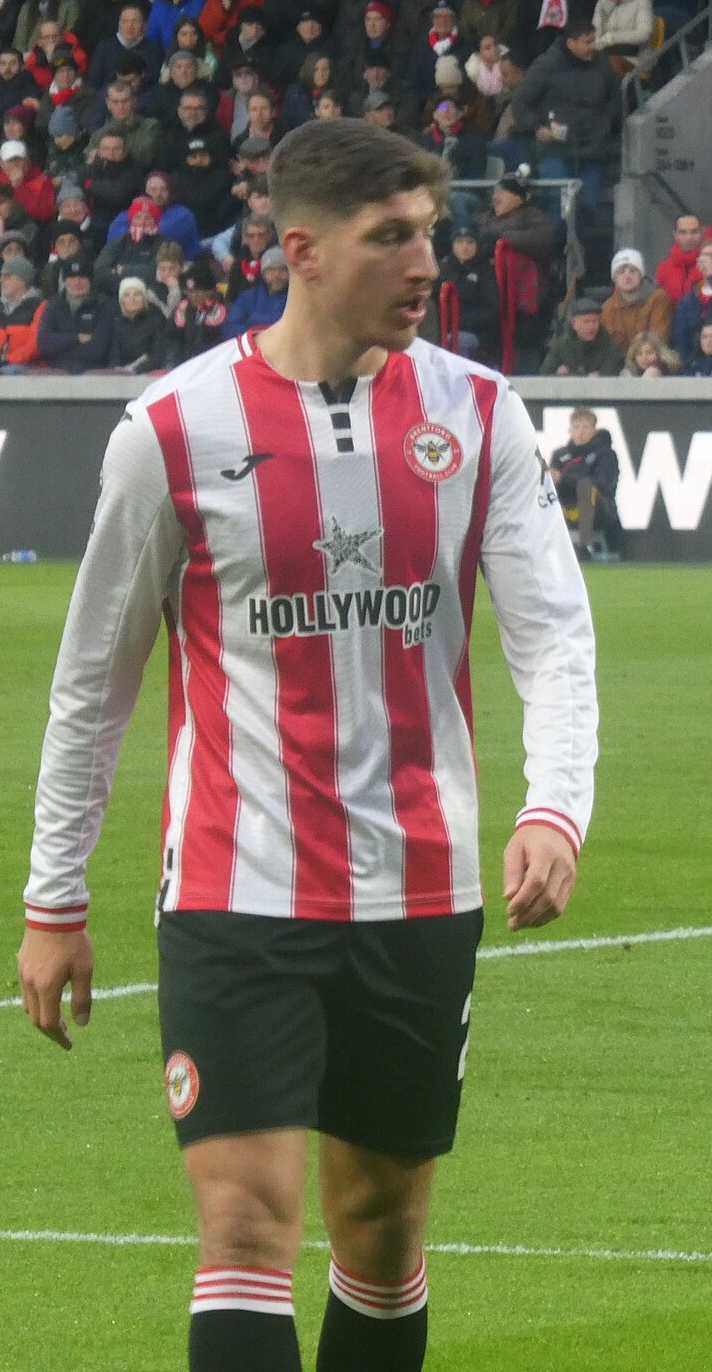
- Janelt playing for Brentford in 2025

Personal information
- Full name: Vitaly Janelt
- Date of birth: 10 May 1998 (age 28)
- Place of birth: Hamburg, Germany
- Height: 1.84 m (6 ft 0 in)
- Position: Defensive midfielder

Team information
- Current team: Brentford
- Number: 27

Youth career
- –2007: Bargfelder SV
- 2007–2010: SSC Hagen Ahrensburg
- 2010–2014: Hamburger SV
- 2014–2017: RB Leipzig

Senior career*
Years	Team	Apps	(Gls)
2016–2017	RB Leipzig II	6	(0)
2016–2018	RB Leipzig	0	(0)
2017–2018	→ VfL Bochum (loan)	20	(0)
2018–2020	VfL Bochum	33	(2)
2020–	Brentford	207	(15)

International career^{‡}
2013	Germany U15	2	(1)
2014–2015	Germany U17	16	(4)
2016	Germany U19	2	(0)
2019	Germany U20	1	(0)
2019–2021	Germany U21	10	(0)
2026–	Germany	1	(0)
Medal record
Men's football
Representing Germany
UEFA European Under-21 Championship
Winner	2021 Hungary–Slovenia
- * Club domestic league appearances and goals as of 10:48, 30 September 2026 (UTC) ‡ National team caps and goals as of 22:09, 1 October 2026 (UTC)

Vitaly Janelt (born 10 May 1998) is a German professional footballer who plays as a defensive midfielder for Premier League club Brentford and the Germany national team.

Janelt is a product of the Hamburger SV and RB Leipzig academies and made his professional breakthrough at VfL Bochum in 2017, before moving to England to join Brentford in 2020. He was capped by Germany at youth level and was a part of the 2021 European U21 Championship-winning squad. Janelt made his senior international debut in 2026.

== Club career ==
=== RB Leipzig ===
After beginning his career with spells in the youth systems at Bargfelder SV, SSC Hagen Ahrensburg and Hamburger SV, Janelt joined the academy at RB Leipzig in 2014, for a fee reported to be €150,000. He signed a five-year professional contract in July 2016 and progressed to the reserve team, for which he made six Regionalliga Nordost appearances during the 2016–17 season. Prior to Janelt's departure from the Red Bull Arena at the end of the 2017–18 season, disciplinary issues led to him spending 18 months away on loan. He failed to win a call into a first team matchday squad during his time with RB Leipzig.

=== VfL Bochum ===
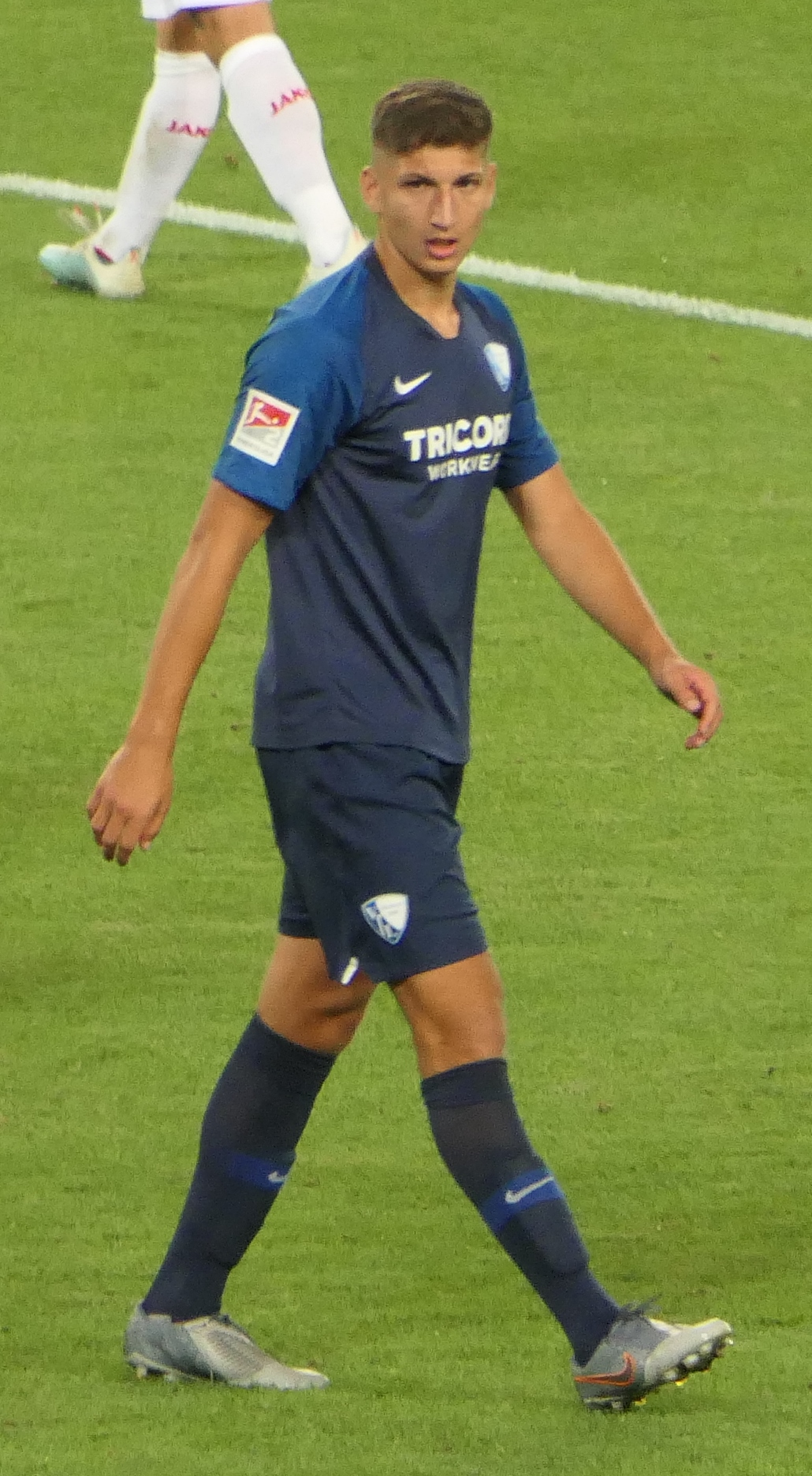
Janelt playing for VfL Bochum in 2019.

On 9 January 2017, Janelt joined 2. Bundesliga club VfL Bochum on loan until 30 June 2018, with an option to buy. He made 20 appearances during an injury-affected spell and signed a three-year contract with the club on 30 May 2018, for an undisclosed fee. Janelt looked set to make a breakthrough late in the 2018–19 season, before a torn adductor ruled him out of the final eight matches of the campaign. He broke into the first team in 2019–20, making 24 appearances during a season which was ended prematurely by the COVID-19 pandemic.

Then in the final season of his contract, Janelt departed VfL Bochum in October 2020 and ended his 3 1/2 years at the Ruhrstadion with 54 appearances. In December 2021, Janelt stated that he "struggled to find consistency" during his spell with the club, exacerbated by playing under six different managers. He was frequently deployed as a utility player, filling in as a left winger, left back, central defender and on one occasion, as a stand-in goalkeeper late in a match.

=== Brentford ===
==== 2020–21 season ====
On 3 October 2020, Janelt moved to England to sign a four-year contract with Championship club Brentford for an undisclosed fee of "around" £500,000. Despite being earmarked by co-director of football Rasmus Ankersen as an overseas player who would "need time to adapt to English football", an injury suffered by first-choice defensive midfielder Christian Nørgaard in the days following the transfer allowed Janelt to break into the matchday squad. By late October, he had assumed Nørgaard's starting role. Janelt retained his place throughout the campaign and finished Brentford's 2021 EFL Championship play-off final-winning 2020–21 season with 47 appearances and four goals.

==== 2021–22 season ====
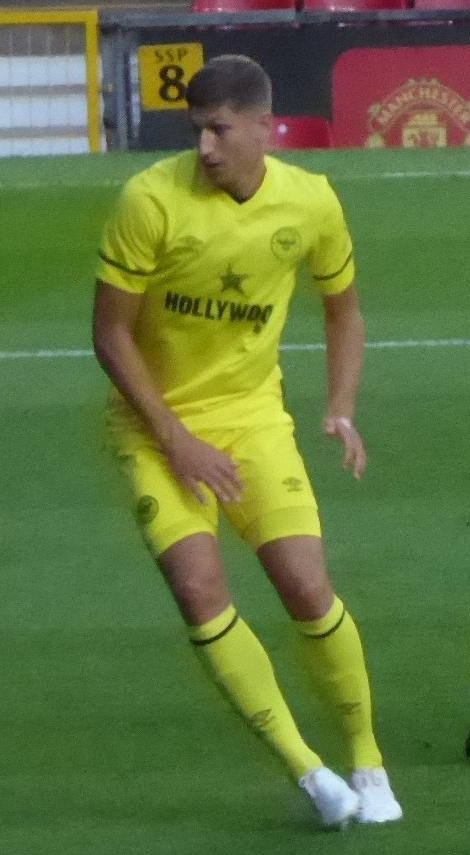
Janelt in 2021

Janelt began the 2021–22 season as an ever-present starter in Premier League matches and he scored his first goal of the season in a 3–3 draw with Liverpool on 25 September 2021. Aside from missing one month due to a thigh injury suffered in October 2021, Janelt continued in his virtual ever-present role and signed a new four-year contract on 1 April 2022. The following day, he scored his third and fourth goals of the season in a 4–1 win over Chelsea and finished the campaign with 35 appearances.

==== 2022–23 season ====
Janelt began the 2022–23 season primarily in a substitute role and he captained the club for the first time during a 2–0 EFL Cup second round win over Colchester United on 23 August 2022. Despite airing some concerns about his playing time, Janelt finished the season with 37 appearances (predominantly as a starter) and three goals.

==== 2023–24 season ====
Janelt was an ever-present in all competitions during 2023–24 season and ended the campaign with 42 appearances and one goal, scored in a 4–2 defeat to Newcastle United on the final day of the season. Following the loss of first-choice wing-backs Rico Henry and Aaron Hickey due to injury, he deputised at left wing back on an ad-hoc basis. Janelt's performances during the 2023–24 season were recognised with the Brentford Players' Player of the Year award. As a testament to his durability, during the season, Janelt became the first Brentford player to make 100 Premier League appearances.

==== 2024–2026 ====
Despite playing with a heel complaint throughout the season, Janelt was again a virtual ever-present during 2024–25. He started in all but six of his 35 appearances in all competitions and captained the team in six matches. After missing the final five matches of the season to undergo surgery on his achilles tendon, Janelt returned to match play in mid-September 2025. He broke back into the starting lineup in mid-December 2025 and in January 2026 he signed a new 4 1/2-year contract, with the option of a further year. Either side of 2 1/2 months out with a metatarsal injury, Janelt made 30 appearances and scored one goal during the 2025–26 season.

== International career ==
Janelt was capped by Germany at U15, U17, U19, U20 and U21 levels. He was a part of the Germany squads at the 2015 UEFA European U17 Championship and the 2015 U17 World Cup. Janelt made four appearances during the U21 team's successful 2021 UEFA European U21 Championship qualifying campaign. He made four substitute appearances during the team's successful finals campaign.

On 25 September 2021, it was reported that German senior head coach Hansi Flick was present at one of Janelt's club matches.

Janelt was named in the senior national squad for two 2026–27 UEFA Nations League group stage matches in October 2026. On 1 October 2026, he made his senior international debut in a game against Serbia.

== Style of play ==
A defensive midfielder or "number eight", Janelt is "strong, versatile, commanding, composed in possession, possesses great awareness, is a good passer and an aggressive winner of the ball". He had also been deployed at centre back and left back. In 2024, Brentford head coach Thomas Frank described Janelt as "the go-to guy in so many ways. He is a very intelligent footballer, a fantastic character with leadership potential and he makes our team better".

== Personal life ==
Janelt's brothers Vincent and Victor are footballers in the German lower leagues. He became a Bosnian citizen in March 2025 and has a Bosnian wife, Ines Kovač, born in Sarajevo. Janelt has a daughter, born in July 2025.

== Career statistics ==
=== Club ===
As of match played 18 September 2026

Appearances and goals by club, season and competition
Club	Season	League			National cup (Note: Includes DFB-Pokal, FA Cup)		League cup (Note: Includes EFL Cup)		Other		Total	
Club	Season	Division	Apps	Goals	Apps	Goals	Apps	Goals	Apps	Goals	Apps	Goals
RB Leipzig II	2016–17	Regionalliga Nordost	6	0	—		—		—		6	0
VfL Bochum (loan)	2016–17	2. Bundesliga	7	0	—		—		—		7	0
VfL Bochum (loan)	2017–18	2. Bundesliga	13	0	0	0	—		—		13	0
VfL Bochum	2018–19	2. Bundesliga	9	1	1	0	—		—		10	1
VfL Bochum	2019–20	2. Bundesliga	24	1	0	0	—		—		24	1
VfL Bochum	Total		53	2	1	0	—		—		54	2
Brentford	2020–21	Championship	41	3	1	0	2	0	3 (Note: Appearances in Championship play-offs)	1	47	4
Brentford	2021–22	Premier League	31	4	2	0	2	0	—		35	4
Brentford	2022–23	Premier League	35	3	1	0	1	0	—		37	3
Brentford	2023–24	Premier League	38	1	2	0	2	0	—		42	1
Brentford	2024–25	Premier League	32	1	0	0	3	0	—		35	1
Brentford	2025–26	Premier League	25	1	2	0	3	0	—		30	1
Brentford	2026–27	Premier League	5	2	0	0	1	0	—		6	2
Brentford	Total		207	15	8	0	13	0	3	1	231	16
Career total			266	17	9	0	13	0	3	1	281	18

=== International ===
As of match played 1 October 2026

Appearances and goals by national team and year
National team	Year	Apps	Goals
Germany	2026	1	0
Total		1	0

== Honours ==
Brentford

- EFL Championship play-offs: 2021

Germany U21

- UEFA European U21 Championship: 2021

Individual

- Brentford Players' Player of the Year: 2023–24
