= Felix Bastians =

German footballer

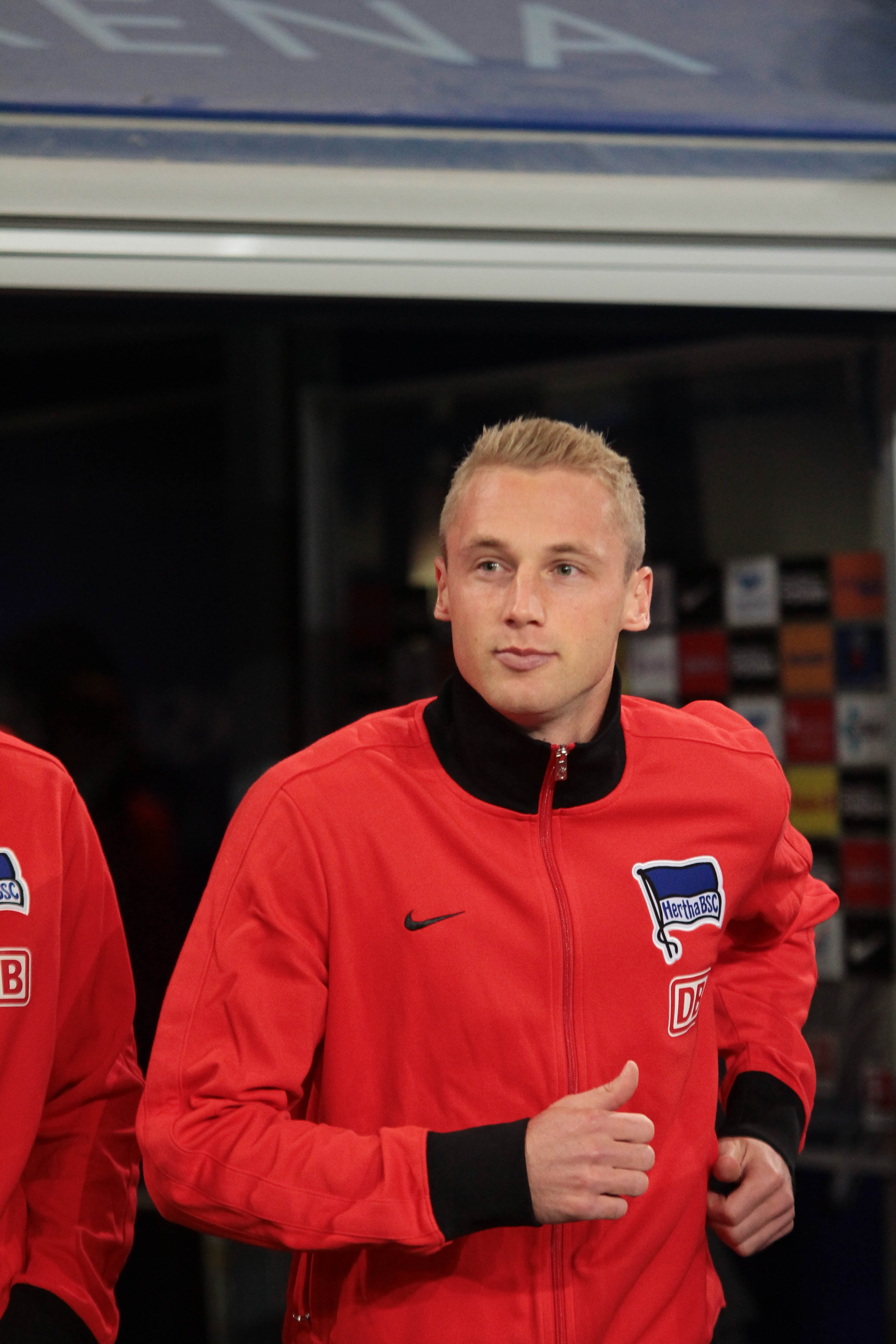
- Bastians with Hertha BSC in 2012

Personal information
- Date of birth: 9 May 1988 (age 38)
- Place of birth: Bochum, West Germany
- Height: 1.88 m (6 ft 2 in)
- Positions: Centre-back; left-back

Youth career
- –1997: SG Wattenscheid 09
- 1997–2002: VfL Bochum
- 2002–2003: Borussia Dortmund
- 2003–2005: Nottingham Forest

Senior career*
Years	Team	Apps	(Gls)
2005–2008	Nottingham Forest	14	(0)
2006–2007	→ Northwich Victoria (loan)	4	(1)
2007	→ Halifax Town (loan)	9	(4)
2007	→ Gillingham (loan)	5	(1)
2007	→ Chesterfield (loan)	12	(1)
2008	→ Notts County (loan)	5	(0)
2008	→ Milton Keynes Dons (loan)	0	(0)
2008–2009	Young Boys	20	(2)
2009–2011	SC Freiburg	79	(1)
2012–2014	Hertha BSC	24	(0)
2013	→ Hertha BSC II	2	(0)
2013–2014	→ VfL Bochum (loan)	13	(0)
2015–2018	VfL Bochum	92	(9)
2018–2021	Tianjin TEDA	57	(2)
2021	Waasland-Beveren	9	(0)
2021–2023	Rot-Weiss Essen	63	(10)
Total		407	(31)

International career
2006	Germany U18	6	(2)
2007	Germany U19	3	(0)
2009–2010	Germany U21	9	(0)
- * Club domestic league appearances and goals

Felix Bastians (born 9 May 1988) is a German former professional footballer who played as a centre-back or left-back.

== Club career ==
=== Early career ===
Bastians began his career with SG Wattenscheid 09 and VfL Bochum before moving to Borussia Dortmund. In November 2003 at 15 years old he signed for English club Nottingham Forest.

=== England ===
Bastians spent most of his time in England on the bench. He played as a defensive midfielder in the earlier stages of his career, always managing to get up for corners and head the ball goalways. Forest boss Colin Calderwood named him as an upcoming talent and already a huge asset to the club. He had a successful debut, assisting a goal in Forest's 3–2 defeat against Woking in the Football League Trophy in November 2005.

He joined Northwich Victoria on loan from Nottingham Forest in November 2006, scoring once in four appearances. He then joined Gillingham on 22 March 2007 on a loan until the end of the 2006–07 season. He made his Gillingham debut in the 5–0 away defeat to Carlisle United on 24 March 2007 and scored his first goal in a 3–2 away defeat to Rotherham United on 7 April 2007.

Bastians was part of the successful Forest reserve side who won the Pontins Holiday League Championship title for the 2006–07 season, beating Rotherham 2–0 in the play-off final, Bastians scored a number of goals throughout the season to help his side lift the title.

He joined Chesterfield on a month's loan in October 2007. He impressed in his spell at Chesterfield, scoring one goal in thirteen appearances. His loan spell there ended on 2 January 2008. Bastians signed for Notts County two days later on a month's loan. On 14 February 2008, he joined another League Two club, MK Dons, once again on a month's loan. He later returned to The Reds, but failed to earn himself a new deal at the club and was released by mutual consent by manager Colin Calderwood on 21 May 2008.

Bastians ended his forest career having played 33 games and scoring five goals in the process. He is the third youngest player ever to play for Forest, behind Gary Mills and Craig Westcarr.

=== Young Boys Bern ===
Bastians moved to Swiss Super League side Young Boys Bern in 2008. On 10 August 2008, he scored his first goal for his new team, the equaliser in a 2–1 win against Neuchâtel Xamax in front of over 16,000 supporters at the Stade de Suisse in Bern.

=== SC Freiburg ===
After just one year with Young Boys Bern he left on 7 July 2009 in order to transfer to SC Freiburg. At Freiburg, Bastians swapped his position from a winger to a defender, being mainly used as a centre back alongside Pavel Krmaš.

=== Hertha BSC ===
On 28 January 2012, Bastians completed a move to Hertha BSC which would see him there until the summer of 2016.

=== VfL Bochum ===
In June 2013, he was loaned out to Bochum. After the loan spell, Bastians returned to Hertha Berlin. On 9 October 2014, Hertha released him. On 17 November 2014, VfL Bochum announced the signing of Bastians starting 1 January 2015.

=== Tianjin Teda ===
In January 2018 he moved to Tianjin Teda in the Chinese Super League who, managed by countryman Uli Stielike whose daughter is reportedly married to Bastian's brother, paid around €1 million for his services.

=== Rot-Weiss Essen ===
On 9 November 2023, Bastians's contract with Rot-Weiss Essen was terminated by mutual consent. He decided to retire from playing shortly thereafter.

== International career ==
Bastians represented Germany at U18, U19 and U21 international levels.

== Career statistics ==
Appearances and goals by club, season and competition
Club	Season	League			Cup		Other		Total	
Club	Season	Division	Apps	Goals	Apps	Goals	Apps	Goals	Apps	Goals
Nottingham Forest	2005–06	League One	11	0	1	0	1 (Note: Appearances in the Football League Trophy)	0	13	0
Nottingham Forest	2006–07	League One	2	0	0	0	—		2	0
Nottingham Forest	2007–08	League One	1	0	0	0	2 (Note: Appearances in the League Cup and Football League Trophy)	0	3	0
Nottingham Forest	Total		14	0	1	0	3	0	18	0
Northwich Victoria (loan)	2006–07	Conference National	4	1	1	0	—		5	1
Halifax Town (loan)	2006–07	Conference National	9	4	0	0	1	0	10	4
Gillingham (loan)	2006–07	League One	5	1	0	0	—		5	1
Chesterfield (loan)	2007–08	League Two	12	1	1	0	—		13	1
Notts County (loan)	2007–08	League Two	5	0	0	0	—		5	0
Milton Keynes Dons (loan)	2007–08	League Two	0	0	0	0	—		0	0
Young Boys Bern	2008–09	Swiss Super League	21	2	4	0	4 (Note: Appearances in the UEFA Cup)	0	29	2
SC Freiburg	2009–10	Bundesliga	34	1	2	0	—		36	1
SC Freiburg	2010–11	Bundesliga	29	0	2	0	—		31	0
SC Freiburg	2011–12	Bundesliga	16	0	1	0	—		17	0
SC Freiburg	Total		79	1	5	0	—		84	1
Hertha BSC	2011–12	Bundesliga	13	0	1	0	1 (Note: Appearances in the Bundesliga relegation playoff)	0	15	0
Hertha BSC	2012–13	2. Bundesliga	11	0	1	0	—		12	0
Hertha BSC	Total		24	0	2	0	1	0	27	0
Hertha BSC II	2012–13	Regionalliga Nordost	2	0	—		—		2	0
VfL Bochum (loan)	2013–14	2. Bundesliga	13	0	0	0	—		13	0
VfL Bochum	2013–14	2. Bundesliga	15	0	0	0	—		15	0
VfL Bochum	2015–16	2. Bundesliga	31	2	4	0	—		35	2
VfL Bochum	2016–17	2. Bundesliga	30	3	1	0	—		31	3
VfL Bochum	2017–18	2. Bundesliga	16	4	2	0	—		18	4
VfL Bochum	Total		105	9	7	0	—		112	9
Tianjin TEDA	2018	Chinese Super League	29	1	2	0	—		31	1
Tianjin TEDA	2019	Chinese Super League	14	0	2	0	—		16	0
Tianjin TEDA	2020	Chinese Super League	14	1	0	0	—		14	1
Tianjin TEDA	Total		57	2	4	0	—		61	2
Waasland-Beveren	2020–21	Belgian First Division A	9	0	1	0	1 (Note: Appearance in relegation play-offs)	0	11	0
Rot-Weiss Essen	2021–22	Regionalliga West	28	3	—		—		28	3
Rot-Weiss Essen	2022–23	3. Liga	29	6	—		—		29	6
Rot-Weiss Essen	2023–24	3. Liga	6	1	1	0	—		7	1
Rot-Weiss Essen	Total		63	10	1	0	—		64	10
Career total			407	31	27	0	10	0	444	31
