= Stefano Celozzi =

German footballer

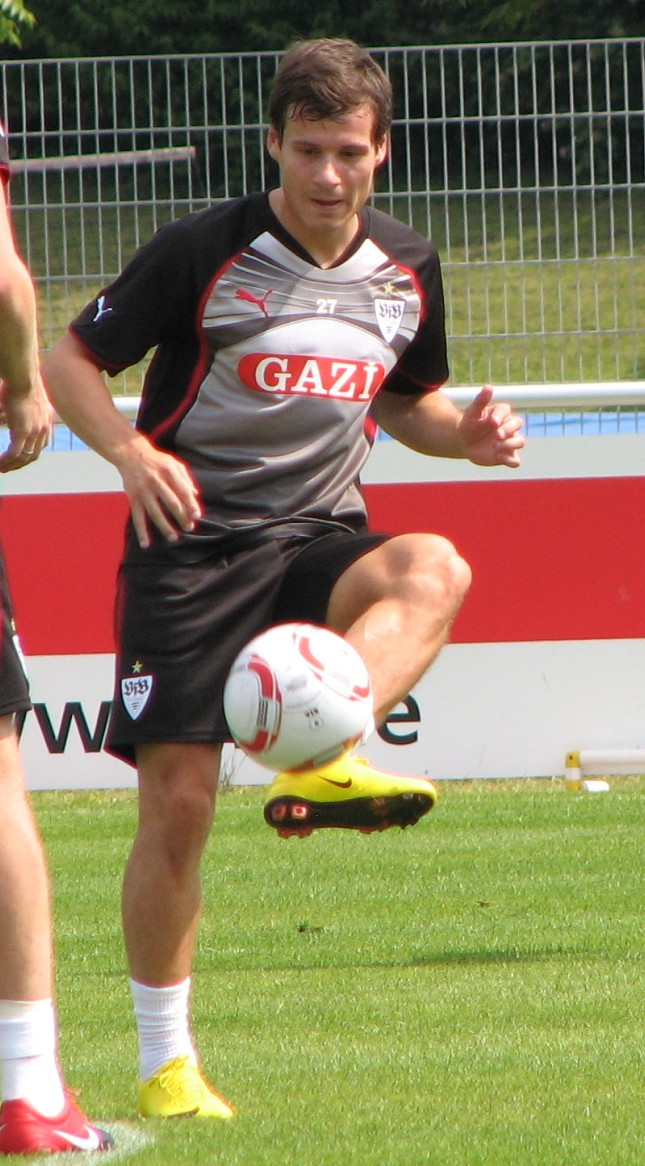

Personal information
- Full name: Stefano Celozzi
- Date of birth: 2 November 1988 (age 37)
- Place of birth: Günzburg, West Germany
- Height: 1.71 m (5 ft 7 in)
- Position: Right-back

Youth career
- SC Bubesheim
- TSV Wasserburg
- SSV Ulm 1846
- 2005: Bayern Munich

Senior career*
Years	Team	Apps	(Gls)
2005–2008	Bayern Munich II	81	(3)
2008–2009	Karlsruher SC	27	(0)
2009	→ Karlsruher SC II	1	(0)
2009–2012	VfB Stuttgart	30	(0)
2011	→ VfB Stuttgart II	1	(0)
2012–2014	Eintracht Frankfurt	38	(0)
2014–2020	VfL Bochum	128	(1)
Total		306	(4)

International career
2003–2004	Germany U16	7	(0)
2004–2005	Germany U17	6	(0)
2009	Germany U21	3	(0)
- * Club domestic league appearances and goals

Stefano Celozzi (born 2 November 1988) is a German former professional footballer who played as a right-back.

== Club career ==
=== Youth ===
After playing youth football with a succession of local clubs, including SSV Ulm 1846, Celozzi joined the youth setup of Bayern Munich in 2005. He quickly progressed to the reserve team, making his debut in the Regionalliga in August 2005, aged just 16. Over the next three seasons, Celozzi played 81 games at this level, scoring three times. He was named as part of the first-team squad for the 2007–08 season, but did not make an appearance, continuing to be a regular for the reserves.

=== Karlsruher SC ===
In July 2008, Celozzi joined Karlsruher SC, and made his first appearance on 10 August 2008 in the first round of the DFB-Pokal, against SpVgg Ansbach. He made his Bundesliga debut on 16 August 2008 in the opening fixture against VfL Bochum. Karlsruhe were relegated at the end of the season.

=== VfB Stuttgart ===
Following Karlsruhe's relegation, Celozzi moved to VfB Stuttgart in June 2009.

On 3 May 2012, VfB Stuttgart announced that the expiring contract of Celozzi would not be extended.

=== Eintracht Frankfurt ===
On 7 May 2012, Eintracht Frankfurt announced that they had signed Celozzi on a two-year contract, starting from the 2012–13 Bundesliga season.

=== VfL Bochum ===
On 14 July 2014, Bochum announced that they had signed Celozzi on a two-year contract, starting from the 2014–15 2. Bundesliga season.

Celozzi retired from football in June 2020.

=== Career statistics ===
Appearances and goals by club, season and competition
Club	Season	League			DFB-Pokal		Europe^{1}		Total		Ref.
Club	Season	Division	Apps	Goals	Apps	Goals	Apps	Goals	Apps	Goals	Ref.
Bayern Munich II	2005–06	Regionalliga Süd	32	0	—				32	0	
Bayern Munich II	2006–07	Regionalliga Süd	18	1	—				18	1	
Bayern Munich II	2007–08	Regionalliga Süd	31	2	—				31	2	
Bayern Munich II	Totals		81	3	—				81	3	—
Karlsruhe II	2008–09	Regionalliga Süd	1	0	—		—		1	0	
Karlsruhe	2008–09	Bundesliga	27	0	2	0	—		29	0	
Stuttgart	2009–10	Bundesliga	21	0	0	0	7	0	28	0	
Stuttgart	2010–11	Bundesliga	7	0	1	0	3	0	11	0	
Stuttgart	2011–12	Bundesliga	2	0	1	0	—		3	0	
Stuttgart	Totals		30	0	2	0	10	0	42	0	—
Stuttgart II	2010–11	3. Liga	1	0	—		—		1	0	
Eintracht Frankfurt	2012–13	Bundesliga	27	0	1	0	—		28	0	
Eintracht Frankfurt	2013–14	Bundesliga	11	0	0	0	5	0	16	0	
Eintracht Frankfurt	Totals		38	0	1	0	5	0	44	0	—
VfL Bochum	2014–15	2. Bundesliga	32	0	2	0	—		34	0	
VfL Bochum	2015–16	2. Bundesliga	34	0	4	0	—		38	0	
VfL Bochum	2016–17	2. Bundesliga	6	1	1	0	—		7	1	
VfL Bochum	2017–18	2. Bundesliga	26	0	1	0	—		27	0	
VfL Bochum	2018–19	2. Bundesliga	22	0	1	0	—		23	0	
VfL Bochum	2019–20	2. Bundesliga	8	0	1	0	—		9	0	
VfL Bochum	Totals		128	1	10	0	—		138	1	—
Career totals			306	4	13	0	15	0	334	4	—

- 1.Includes Champions League and Europa League.

== International career ==
Celozzi has played for Germany at U-16 and U-18 levels, and since the beginning of the 2009–10 season has been part of the U-21 squad, winning three caps to date.
