= Tim Hoogland =

German footballer

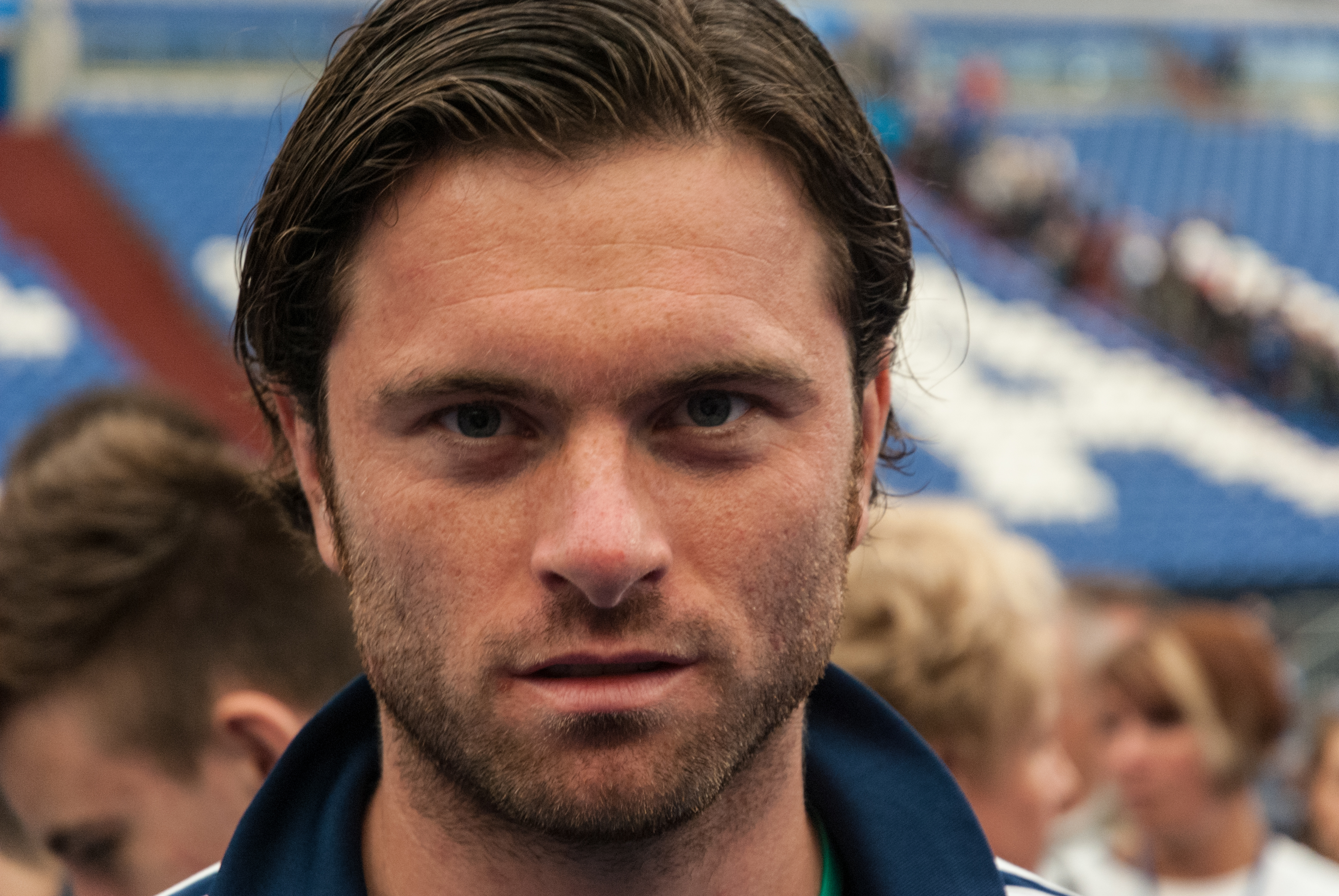
- Hoogland with Schalke 04 in 2013

Personal information
- Full name: Tim Klaus Hoogland
- Date of birth: 11 June 1985 (age 41)
- Place of birth: Marl, West Germany
- Height: 1.83 m (6 ft 0 in)
- Positions: Defensive midfielder; centre-back; right back

Youth career
- 1990–1996: VfB Hüls
- 1996–1998: TSV Marl-Hüls
- 1998–2003: FC Schalke

Senior career*
Years	Team	Apps	(Gls)
2003–2007	FC Schalke II	44	(7)
2004–2007	FC Schalke	12	(0)
2007–2010	FSV Mainz	84	(14)
2010–2014	FC Schalke	22	(0)
2012–2013	→ VfB Stuttgart (loan)	4	(0)
2014–2015	Fulham	25	(4)
2015–2019	VfL Bochum	118	(7)
2019–2020	Melbourne Victory	6	(0)
Total		315	(32)

International career
2002–2003	Germany U18	5	(0)
2003	Germany U19	2	(0)
2004–2005	Germany U20	3	(0)
- * Club domestic league appearances and goals as of 9 August 2019

Tim Klaus Hoogland (born 11 June 1985) is a retired German footballer who last played as a defender or midfielder for Australian A-League club Melbourne Victory FC.

== Club career ==
Hoogland made his professional debut in the Bundesliga for Schalke 04 on 5 February 2005. He was substituted on in the 75th minute in a match against Hansa Rostock. After nine years with Schalke 04, Hoogland signed with 1. FSV Mainz 05.

On 12 January 2010, Hoogland confirmed that he had signed a contract with Schalke 04 returning him to his former club. His new contract kept him in Gelsenkirchen from 1 July 2010 through 30 June 2014.

For the 2012–13 season Hoogland was loaned out to VfB Stuttgart. After four Bundesliga appearances for Stuttgart he left the club after the season. He returned to his parent club, Schalke 04, for the 2013–14 season, where he scored his only goal in European competitions in a 3–1 away defeat against Real Madrid during the Champions League round of 16.

Hoogland signed for Championship team Fulham on a one-year contract on 30 June 2014 on a free transfer. He scored on his debut in a 2–1 defeat to Ipswich.

On 16 August 2019, Hoogland signed with Australian A-League club Melbourne Victory FC on a one-year contract.

== Managerial career ==
After retiring from his career in the summer of 2020, Hoogland began an internship at Schalke 04's youth academy. During the 2021–22 season, he became an assistant coach to Jörg Behnert at Schalke U17. In the following season, he joined Norbert Elgert's coaching staff at Schalke 04 U19.

== Personal life ==
Hoogland attended the Gesamtschule Berger Feld.

== Career statistics ==
As of 4 September 2019

Club	Season	League			Cup		League Cup		Continental		Total	
Club	Season	Division	Apps	Goals	Apps	Goals	Apps	Goals	Apps	Goals	Apps	Goals
Schalke 04 II	2003–04	Regionalliga Nord	6	0	—		—		—		6	0
Schalke 04 II	2004–05	Oberliga Westfalen	17	3	—		—		—		17	3
Schalke 04 II	2005–06	Oberliga Westfalen	11	0	—		—		—		11	0
Schalke 04 II	2006–07	Oberliga Westfalen	10	4	—		—		—		10	4
Schalke 04 II	Total		44	7	0	0	0	0	0	0	44	7
Schalke 04	2004–05	Bundesliga	3	0	1	0	—		1 (Note: Appearance in UEFA Intertoto Cup)	0	5	0
Schalke 04	2005–06	Bundesliga	0	0	0	0	1	0	0	0	1	0
Schalke 04	2006–07	Bundesliga	9	0	1	0	0	0	0	0	10	0
Schalke 04	Total		12	0	2	0	1	0	1	0	16	0
Mainz 05	2007–08	2. Bundesliga	30	5	2	0	—		—		32	5
Mainz 05	2008–09	2. Bundesliga	33	3	4	0	—		—		37	3
Mainz 05	2009–10	Bundesliga	21	6	1	0	—		—		22	6
Mainz 05	Total		84	14	7	0	0	0	0	0	91	14
Schalke 04	2010–11	Bundesliga	0	0	0	0	—		0	0	0	0
Schalke 04	2011–12	Bundesliga	3	0	0	0	—		1 (Note: Appearance(s) in UEFA Europa League)	0	4	0
Schalke 04	2013–14	Bundesliga	19	0	1	0	—		2 (Note: Appearances in UEFA Champions League)	1	22	1
Schalke 04	Total		22	0	1	0	0	0	3	1	26	1
VfB Stuttgart	2012–13	Bundesliga	4	0	1	0	—		1	0	6	0
Fulham	2014–15	Championship	25	4	0	0	3	0	—		28	4
VfL Bochum	2015–16	2. Bundesliga	33	4	4	1	—		—		37	5
VfL Bochum	2016–17	2. Bundesliga	28	2	1	0	—		—		29	2
VfL Bochum	2017–18	2. Bundesliga	26	0	1	0	—		—		27	0
VfL Bochum	2018–19	2. Bundesliga	31	1	1	0	—		—		32	1
VfL Bochum	Total		118	7	7	1	0	0	0	0	125	7
Melbourne Victory	2019–20	A-League	0	0	0	0	—		—		0	0
Career total			309	32	18	1	4	0	5	1	336	34

== Honours ==
- Bundesliga runner-up: 2004–05, 2006–07
- DFB-Pokal finalist: 2004–05, 2012–13; winner: 2010–11
- DFB-Ligapokal winner: 2005
- UEFA Intertoto Cup: 2004
