= Norbert Elgert =

German footballer and manager

Personal information
- Date of birth: 13 January 1957 (age 69)
- Place of birth: Gelsenkirchen, Germany
- Height: 1.78 m (5 ft 10 in)
- Position: Forward

Youth career
- –1975: Westfalia Westerkappeln

Senior career*
Years	Team	Apps	(Gls)
1975	Schalke 04	3	(0)
1975–1978	Westfalia Herne	14	(3)
1978–1982	Schalke 04	74	(17)
1982	VfL Osnabrück	1	(0)
1982–1985	Wattenscheid 09	61	(16)
1985–1990	SuS Dinslaken		

Managerial career
- 1990–1992: SV Schermbeck
- 1993: SuS Dinslaken
- 1993–1995: Wattenscheid 09 U19
- 1995–1996: FC Rhade
- 1996–2002: Schalke 04 U19
- 2002–2003: Schalke 04 (assistant)
- 2003–: Schalke 04 U19
- * Club domestic league appearances and goals

Norbert Elgert (born 13 January 1957) is a German football manager and former player. He is the manager of the U19 team of Schalke 04 since 1996 (with a short interruption).

Elgert won the German U19 championship with the team in 2006, 2012 and 2015.

He coached the later German world champions Mesut Özil, Manuel Neuer, Benedikt Höwedes and Julian Draxler as well as Leroy Sané, Joël Matip and Sead Kolašinac.

In 2013, he was named the German coach of the year by the German Football Association.

He is a member of the Schalke Hall of Fame ("Ehrenkabine").
