= Florian Kraft =

German footballer

Personal information
- Full name: Florian Kraft
- Date of birth: 4 August 1998 (age 28)
- Place of birth: Marl, Germany
- Height: 1.84 m (6 ft 1/2 in)
- Position: Goalkeeper

Youth career
- VfB Hüls
- Borussia Dortmund
- TSV Marl-Hüls
- –2014: Rot-Weiss Essen
- 2014–2017: VfL Bochum

Senior career*
Years	Team	Apps	(Gls)
2016–2019	VfL Bochum	0	(0)
2019	Fortuna Köln	1	(0)
2019	Wattenscheid 09	5	(0)
2020	Wuppertaler SV	0	(0)
2020–2021	SV Schermbeck	1	(0)
2021–2022	SV Sodingen	16	(0)
2022–2024	FC Marl	23	(0)

International career
2015	Germany U18	1	(0)
- * Club domestic league appearances and goals as of 22:57, 29 December 2024 (UTC)

Florian Kraft (born 4 August 1998) is a German footballer who plays as a goalkeeper.

== Club career ==
Kraft made his professional debut for Fortuna Köln on 18 May 2019 in the 3. Liga in the 0–2 home loss against SG Sonnenhof Großaspach.

On 29 May 2020 it was confirmed, that Kraft would join SV Schermbeck for the 2020-21 season. Already in February 2021 it was confirmed that Kraft would be moving to SV Sodingen for the upcoming season. In the summer 2022, Kraft joined Westfalenliga side FC Marl. He left the club two years later in the summer 2024.

== Career statistics ==
As of 19 May 2019

Club	Season	League			Cup		Total	
Club	Season	Division	Apps	Goals	Apps	Goals	Apps	Goals
VfL Bochum	2016–17	2. Bundesliga	0	0	0	0	0	0
VfL Bochum	2017–18	2. Bundesliga	0	0	0	0	0	0
VfL Bochum	2018–19	2. Bundesliga	0	0	0	0	0	0
VfL Bochum	Total		0	0	0	0	0	0
Fortuna Köln	2018–19	3. Liga	1	0	—		1	0
Fortuna Köln	Total		1	0	0	0	1	0
Career total			1	0	0	0	1	0
