= Jannik Bandowski =

German footballer

Personal information
- Date of birth: 30 March 1994 (age 32)
- Place of birth: Korbach, Germany
- Height: 1.90 m (6 ft 3 in)
- Positions: Left-back; left midfielder

Team information
- Current team: Greifswalder FC
- Number: 27

Youth career
- SC Blau-Gelb Korbach
- –2009: TSV Korbach
- 2009–2011: SC Paderborn
- 2011–2013: Borussia Dortmund

Senior career*
Years	Team	Apps	(Gls)
2013–2015	Borussia Dortmund II	25	(1)
2013–2016	Borussia Dortmund	0	(0)
2015–2016	→ 1860 Munich (loan)	15	(2)
2016	→ 1860 Munich II (loan)	1	(0)
2016–2019	VfL Bochum	9	(1)
2019–2021	SpVgg Unterhaching	18	(0)
2022	TSV Steinbach Haiger	8	(0)
2022–	Greifswalder FC	26	(1)

International career^{‡}
2013	Germany U20	2	(0)
- * Club domestic league appearances and goals as of 23 April 2024 ‡ National team caps and goals as of 12 October 2013

Jannik Bandowski (born 30 March 1994) is a German professional footballer who plays for Greifswalder FC.

== Club career ==
=== Borussia Dortmund II ===
On 3 October 2013, Bandowski scored a goal in a 3. Liga match against Darmstadt 98 in the 11th minute. The match ended 1–1, after he made an own goal nine minutes later.

=== 1860 Munich ===
On 31 January 2015, it was announced, that Bandowski would go on a loan to TSV 1860 Munich. He scored already in his first appearance for his new club on 15 February 2015 in a 1–1 tie against Darmstadt 98.

== Career statistics ==
As of 9 June 2019

Appearances and goals by club, season and competition
Club	Season	League			Cup		Other		Total	
Club	Season	Division	Apps	Goals	Apps	Goals	Apps	Goals	Apps	Goals
Borussia Dortmund II	2012–13	3. Liga	1	0	—		—		1	0
Borussia Dortmund II	2013–14	3. Liga	17	1	—		—		17	1
Borussia Dortmund II	2014–15	3. Liga	7	0	—		—		7	0
Borussia Dortmund II	Total		25	1	0	0	0	0	25	1
1860 Munich	2014–15	2. Bundesliga	14	2	0	0	2 (Note: Includes 3. Liga, 2. Bundesliga promotion, relegation playoffs.)	0	16	2
1860 Munich	2015–16	2. Bundesliga	1	0	0	0	—		1	0
1860 Munich	Total		15	2	0	0	2	0	17	2
1860 Munich	2015–16	Regionalliga Bayern	1	0	—		—		1	0
VfL Bochum	2017–18	2. Bundesliga	6	1	1	1	—		7	2
VfL Bochum	2018–19	2. Bundesliga	3	0	0	0	—		3	0
VfL Bochum	Total		9	1	1	1	0	0	10	2
SpVgg Unterhaching	2019–20	3. Liga	0	0	—		—		0	0
Career total			50	4	1	1	2	0	53	5
