= Nico Rieble =

German footballer

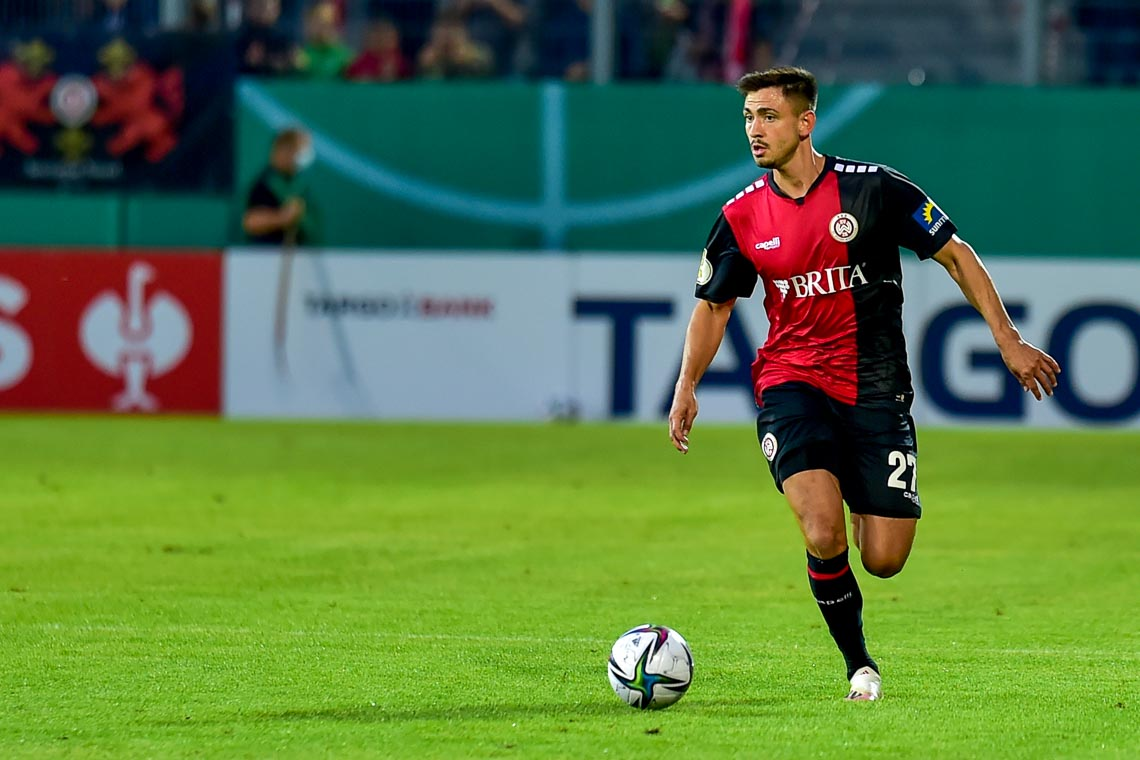

Personal information
- Date of birth: 22 August 1995 (age 31)
- Place of birth: Rastatt, Germany
- Height: 1.83 m (6 ft 0 in)
- Position: Left back

Youth career
- SV Kuppenheim
- –2010: Karlsruher SC
- 2010–2014: 1899 Hoffenheim

Senior career*
Years	Team	Apps	(Gls)
2014–2016	1899 Hoffenheim II	44	(3)
2016–2018	VfL Bochum	21	(0)
2018–2020	Hansa Rostock	55	(0)
2020–2021	VfB Lübeck	35	(0)
2021–2025	SV Wehen Wiesbaden	47	(0)
- * Club domestic league appearances and goals as of 17 May 2025

Nico Rieble (born 22 August 1995) is a German professional footballer who plays as a left back.

== Career statistics ==
As of match played 1 July 2019

Appearances and goals by club, season and competition
Club	Season	League			National Cup		Other		Total	
Club	Season	Division	Apps	Goals	Apps	Goals	Apps	Goals	Apps	Goals
1899 Hoffenheim II	2014–15	Regionalliga Südwest	21	0	—		—		21	0
1899 Hoffenheim II	2015–16	Regionalliga Südwest	23	3	—		—		23	3
1899 Hoffenheim II	Total		44	3	0	0	0	0	44	3
VfL Bochum	2016–17	2. Bundesliga	21	0	0	0	—		21	0
VfL Bochum	2017–18	2. Bundesliga	0	0	0	0	—		0	0
VfL Bochum	Total		21	0	0	0	0	0	21	0
Hansa Rostock	2017–18	3. Liga	12	0	0	0	1 (Note: Appearance in the Mecklenburg-Vorpommern Cup)	0	13	0
Hansa Rostock	2018–19	3. Liga	28	0	2	0	2	0	32	0
Hansa Rostock	2019–20	3. Liga	15	0	1	0	2	2	18	2
Hansa Rostock	Total		55	0	3	0	5	2	63	2
VfB Lübeck	2020–21	3. Liga	35	0	0	0	1 (Note: Appearance in the Schleswig-Holstein Cup)	0	35	0
Wehen Wiesbaden	2021–22	3. Liga	20	0	1	0	1 (Note: Appearance in the Hessian Cup)	0	22	0
Wehen Wiesbaden	2022–23	3. Liga	13	0	0	0	2 (Note: Two appearances in the Hessian Cup and one appearance in the 2022–23 2. Bundesliga Relegation play-offs)	0	15	0
Wehen Wiesbaden	Total		33	0	1	0	3	0	37	0
Career total			188	3	4	0	9	2	201	5
