= Selim Gündüz =

German footballer (born 1994)

Personal information
- Date of birth: 16 May 1994 (age 32)
- Place of birth: Siegen, Germany
- Height: 1.71 m (5 ft 7 in)
- Position: Midfielder

Team information
- Current team: Türkspor Dortmund
- Number: 11

Youth career
- 1999–2007: TuS Deuz
- 2007–2009: Sportfreunde Siegen
- 2009–2012: VfL Bochum

Senior career*
Years	Team	Apps	(Gls)
2011–2014	VfL Bochum II	38	(3)
2011–2018	VfL Bochum	52	(4)
2018–2019	Darmstadt 98	1	(0)
2019–2020	Uerdingen 05	10	(0)
2020–2021	Hallescher FC	4	(0)
2021–2022	Alemannia Aachen	16	(1)
2022–2023	Ankara Keçiörengücü	0	(0)
2024	Berliner AK 07	9	(0)
2024–	Türkspor Dortmund	2	(0)
- * Club domestic league appearances and goals as of 7 October 2024

Selim Gündüz (born 16 May 1994) is a German professional footballer who plays as a midfielder for Türkspor Dortmund.

== Career ==
On 31 August 2018, the last day of the 2018 summer transfer window, Gündüz joined 2. Bundesliga side Darmstadt 98 from league rivals VfL Bochum having agreed a season-long contract. His one-year contract was not extended after relegation in spring 2019.

Gündüz then received a contract valid until June 2020 at KFC Uerdingen 05. Until matchday 11, he was regularly utilised in midfield and on the right wing, but was then demoted to the bench until the end of the season. The club did not renew his expiring contract. For the following season, Gündüz remained in the 3. Liga and signed a one-year contract with Hallescher FC, which was then terminated in mid-March 2021 for personal reasons.

On 22 December 2021, Gündüz joined Alemannia Aachen on a free transfer after nearly a month of training with the club.

== Career statistics ==
As of 1 July 2018

Appearances and goals by club, season and competition
Club	Season	League			Cup		Total	
Club	Season	Division	Apps	Goals	Apps	Goals	Apps	Goals
VfL Bochum II	2012–13	Regionalliga West	10	0	—		10	0
VfL Bochum II	2013–14	Regionalliga West	19	2	—		19	2
VfL Bochum II	2014–15	Regionalliga West	9	1	—		9	1
VfL Bochum II	Total		38	3	0	0	38	3
VfL Bochum	2014–15	2. Bundesliga	15	1	0	0	15	1
VfL Bochum	2015–16	2. Bundesliga	0	0	0	0	0	0
VfL Bochum	2016–17	2. Bundesliga	20	3	0	0	20	3
VfL Bochum	2017–18	2. Bundesliga	17	0	1	0	0	0
VfL Bochum	Total		52	4	1	0	53	4
Career total			90	7	1	0	91	7
