= Nils Quaschner =

German footballer (born 1994)

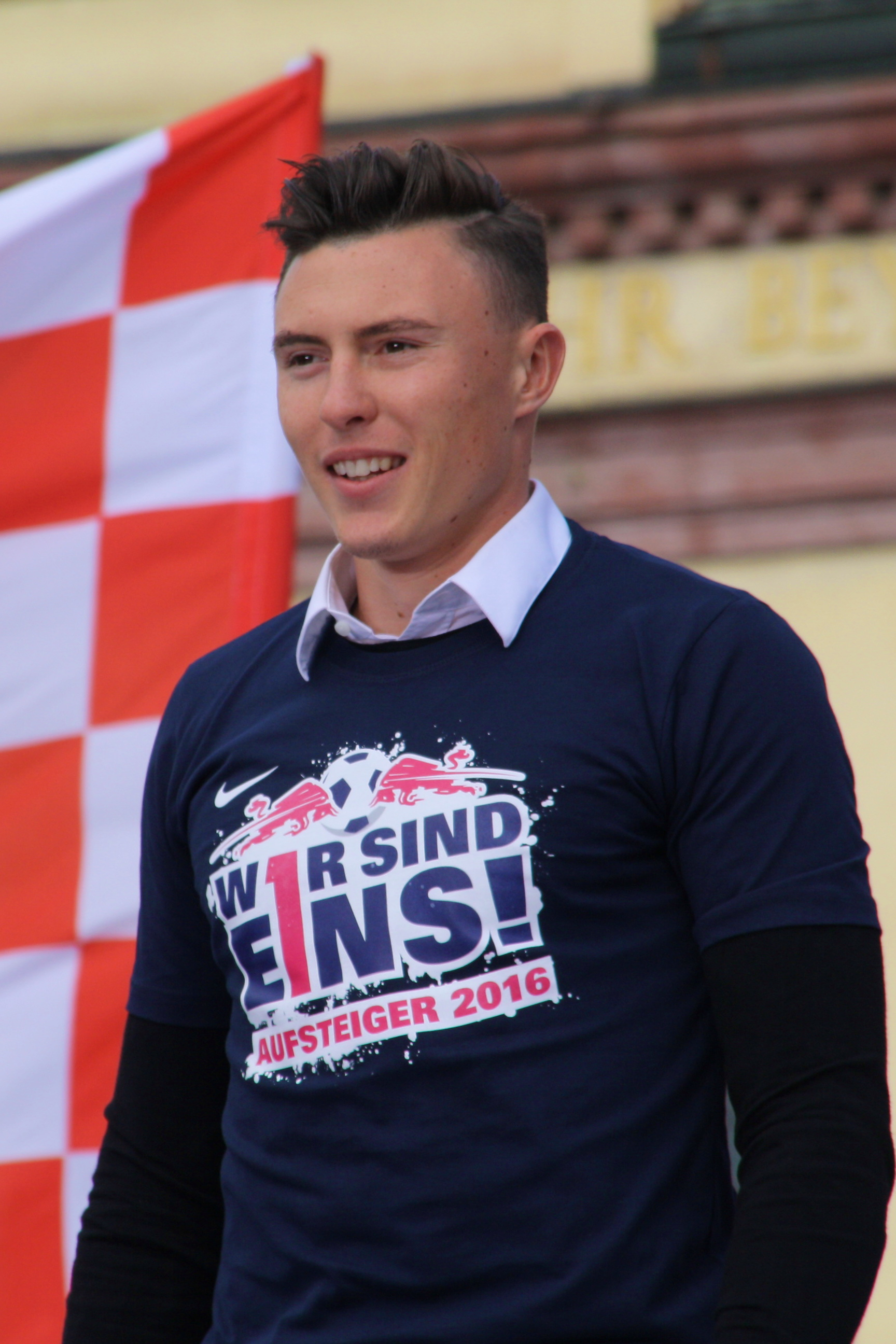
- Quaschner in 2016

Personal information
- Date of birth: 22 April 1994 (age 32)
- Place of birth: Stralsund, Germany
- Height: 1.84 m (6 ft 0 in)
- Position: Striker

Youth career
- 1998–2007: FC Pommern Stralsund
- 2007–2013: Hansa Rostock

Senior career*
Years	Team	Apps	(Gls)
2012–2013	Hansa Rostock II	3	(2)
2012–2013	Hansa Rostock	13	(1)
2013–2015	FC Liefering	29	(15)
2014–2015	Red Bull Salzburg	10	(0)
2015–2017	RB Leipzig	19	(1)
2015–2016	RB Leipzig II	5	(3)
2016–2017	→ VfL Bochum (loan)	26	(3)
2017–2020	Arminia Bielefeld	4	(0)
Total		109	(25)

International career
2009–2010	Germany U16	6	(5)
2010–2011	Germany U17	10	(2)
2011–2012	Germany U18	0	(0)
- * Club domestic league appearances and goals

Nils Quaschner (born 22 April 1994) is a German former professional footballer who played as a striker.

== Career ==
Quaschner started his professional career at Hansa Rostock. On 17 July 2013, he joined FC Liefering. On 12 January 2015, he signed with RB Leipzig.

On 5 July 2017, he signed with Arminia Bielefeld. Quaschner retired due to injury problems in 2020, after his contract with Arminia Bielefeld had expired.

== Career statistics ==
Appearances and goals by club, season and competition
Club	Season	League			Cup		Continental		Total	
Club	Season	Division	Apps	Goals	Apps	Goals	Apps	Goals	Apps	Goals
Hansa Rostock II	2012–13	NOFV-Oberliga Nord	3	2	—		—		3	2
Hansa Rostock	2012–13	3. Liga	13	1	1	0	—		14	1
FC Liefering	2013–14	First League	27	13	—		—		27	13
FC Liefering	2014–15	First League	2	2	—		—		2	2
FC Liefering	Total		29	15	0	0	0	0	29	15
Red Bull Salzburg	2014–15	Bundesliga	10	0	3	2	2	0	15	2
RB Leipzig II	2015–16	Regionalliga Nordost	5	3	—		—		5	3
RB Leipzig	2015–16	2. Bundesliga	19	1	1	0	—		20	1
VfL Bochum (loan)	2016–17	2. Bundesliga	26	3	1	0	—		27	3
Arminia Bielefeld	2017–18	2. Bundesliga	4	0	0	0	—		0	0
Arminia Bielefeld	2018–19	2. Bundesliga	0	0	0	0	—		0	0
Arminia Bielefeld	2019–20	2. Bundesliga	0	0	0	0	—		0	0
Arminia Bielefeld	Total		4	0	0	0	0	0	4	0
Career total			109	25	6	2	2	0	117	27
