= Ulrich Bapoh =

German footballer (born 1999)

Personal information
- Full name: Ulrich Bapoh Luic
- Date of birth: 29 June 1999 (age 27)
- Place of birth: Edéa, Cameroon
- Height: 1.80 m (5 ft 11 in)
- Position: Attacking midfielder

Team information
- Current team: Sportfreunde Lotte

Youth career
- –2009: Blau-Weiß Grümerbaum
- 2009–2018: VfL Bochum

Senior career*
Years	Team	Apps	(Gls)
2017–2020	VfL Bochum	4	(1)
2018–2019	→ FC Twente (loan)	10	(3)
2020–2022	VfL Osnabrück	32	(0)
2023–2025	Alemannia Aachen	30	(2)
2025–	Sportfreunde Lotte	0	(0)

International career^{‡}
2016–2017	Germany U18	5	(0)
2017	Germany U19	1	(1)
- * Club domestic league appearances and goals as of 15:43, 17 January 2025 (UTC) ‡ National team caps and goals as of 23 October 2018

Ulrich Bapoh Luic (born 29 June 1999) is a German professional footballer who plays as an attacking midfielder for Sportfreunde Lotte. He is the nephew of Samuel Eto'o.

== Career ==
In January 2025 Bapoh agreed the termination of his contract with Alemannia Aachen and joined Sportfreunde Lotte of the Regionalliga West.

== Career statistics ==
As of 1 July 2022

Appearances and goals by club, season and competition
Club	Season	League			Cup		Total	
Club	Season	Division	Apps	Goals	Apps	Goals	Apps	Goals
VfL Bochum	2016–17	2. Bundesliga	0	0	0	0	0	0
VfL Bochum	2017–18	2. Bundesliga	0	0	0	0	0	0
VfL Bochum	2019–20	2. Bundesliga	4	1	1	0	5	1
VfL Bochum	Total		4	1	1	0	5	1
FC Twente (loan)	2018–19	Eerste Divisie	10	3	2	0	12	3
VfL Osnabrück	2020–21	2. Bundesliga	10	0	0	0	0	10
VfL Osnabrück	2020–21	2. Bundesliga	22	0	0	0	0	22
VfL Osnabrück	Total		32	0	0	0	32	0
Career total			46	4	3	0	49	4
