= Patrick Fabian (footballer) =

German footballer (born 1987)

Personal information
- Date of birth: 11 October 1987 (age 39)
- Place of birth: Hagen, West Germany
- Height: 1.93 m (6 ft 4 in)
- Position: Centre-back

Youth career
- 1993–1999: VfB Westhofen
- 1999–2000: SF Oestrich Iserlohn
- 2000–2006: VfL Bochum

Senior career*
| Years | Team | Apps | (Gls) |
| 2006–2013 | VfL Bochum II | 112 | (0) |
| 2009–2020 | VfL Bochum | 148 | (5) |
| Total | | 260 | (5) |
- * Club domestic league appearances and goals

Patrick Fabian (born 11 October 1987) is a German retired professional footballer who played as a centre-back.

== Career ==
Fabian was born in Hagen. He made his debut on the professional league level in the Bundesliga with VfL Bochum on 14 February 2009 when he came on as a 90th-minute substitute in a game against Schalke 04. Over the course of his career, Fabian suffered four separate anterior cruciate ligament injuries.

== Career statistics ==
Appearances and goals by club, season and competition
| Club | Season | League | | | DFB-Pokal | | Other | | Total | |
| Club | Season | Division | Apps | Goals | Apps | Goals | Apps | Goals | Apps | Goals |
|---|---|---|---|---|---|---|---|---|---|---|
| VfL Bochum II | 2005–06 | Oberliga Westfalen | 2 | 0 | 0 | 0 | — | | 2 | 0 |
| VfL Bochum II | 2006–07 | Oberliga Westfalen | 29 | 0 | — | | — | | 29 | 0 |
| VfL Bochum II | 2007–08 | Oberliga Westfalen | 31 | 0 | — | | — | | 31 | 0 |
| VfL Bochum II | 2008–09 | Regionalliga West | 17 | 0 | — | | — | | 17 | 0 |
| VfL Bochum II | 2009–10 | Regionalliga West | 18 | 0 | — | | — | | 18 | 0 |
| VfL Bochum II | 2010–11 | Regionalliga West | 9 | 0 | — | | — | | 9 | 0 |
| VfL Bochum II | 2011–12 | Regionalliga West | 2 | 0 | — | | — | | 2 | 0 |
| VfL Bochum II | 2012–13 | Regionalliga West | 4 | 0 | — | | — | | 4 | 0 |
| VfL Bochum II | Total | | 112 | 0 | 0 | 0 | 0 | 0 | 112 | 0 |
| VfL Bochum | 2008–09 | Bundesliga | 5 | 0 | 0 | 0 | — | | 5 | 0 |
| VfL Bochum | 2009–10 | Bundesliga | 1 | 0 | 0 | 0 | — | | 1 | 0 |
| VfL Bochum | 2010–11 | 2. Bundesliga | 6 | 0 | 0 | 0 | 0 (Note: Appearances in the 2. Bundesliga promotion play-offs) | 0 | 6 | 0 |
| VfL Bochum | 2011–12 | 2. Bundesliga | 0 | 0 | 0 | 0 | — | | 0 | 0 |
| VfL Bochum | 2012–13 | 2. Bundesliga | 0 | 0 | 0 | 0 | — | | 0 | 0 |
| VfL Bochum | 2013–14 | 2. Bundesliga | 31 | 2 | 2 | 0 | — | | 33 | 2 |
| VfL Bochum | 2014–15 | 2. Bundesliga | 30 | 0 | 1 | 0 | — | | 31 | 0 |
| VfL Bochum | 2015–16 | 2. Bundesliga | 29 | 1 | 4 | 0 | — | | 33 | 1 |
| VfL Bochum | 2016–17 | 2. Bundesliga | 3 | 0 | 0 | 0 | — | | 3 | 0 |
| VfL Bochum | 2017–18 | 2. Bundesliga | 21 | 0 | 2 | 0 | — | | 23 | 0 |
| VfL Bochum | 2018–19 | 2. Bundesliga | 18 | 2 | 0 | 0 | — | | 18 | 2 |
| VfL Bochum | 2019–20 | 2. Bundesliga | 4 | 0 | 0 | 0 | — | | 4 | 0 |
| VfL Bochum | Total | | 148 | 5 | 9 | 0 | 0 | 0 | 157 | 5 |
| Career total | | | 260 | 5 | 9 | 0 | 0 | 0 | 269 | 5 |
