= Johannes Wurtz =

German footballer (born 1992)

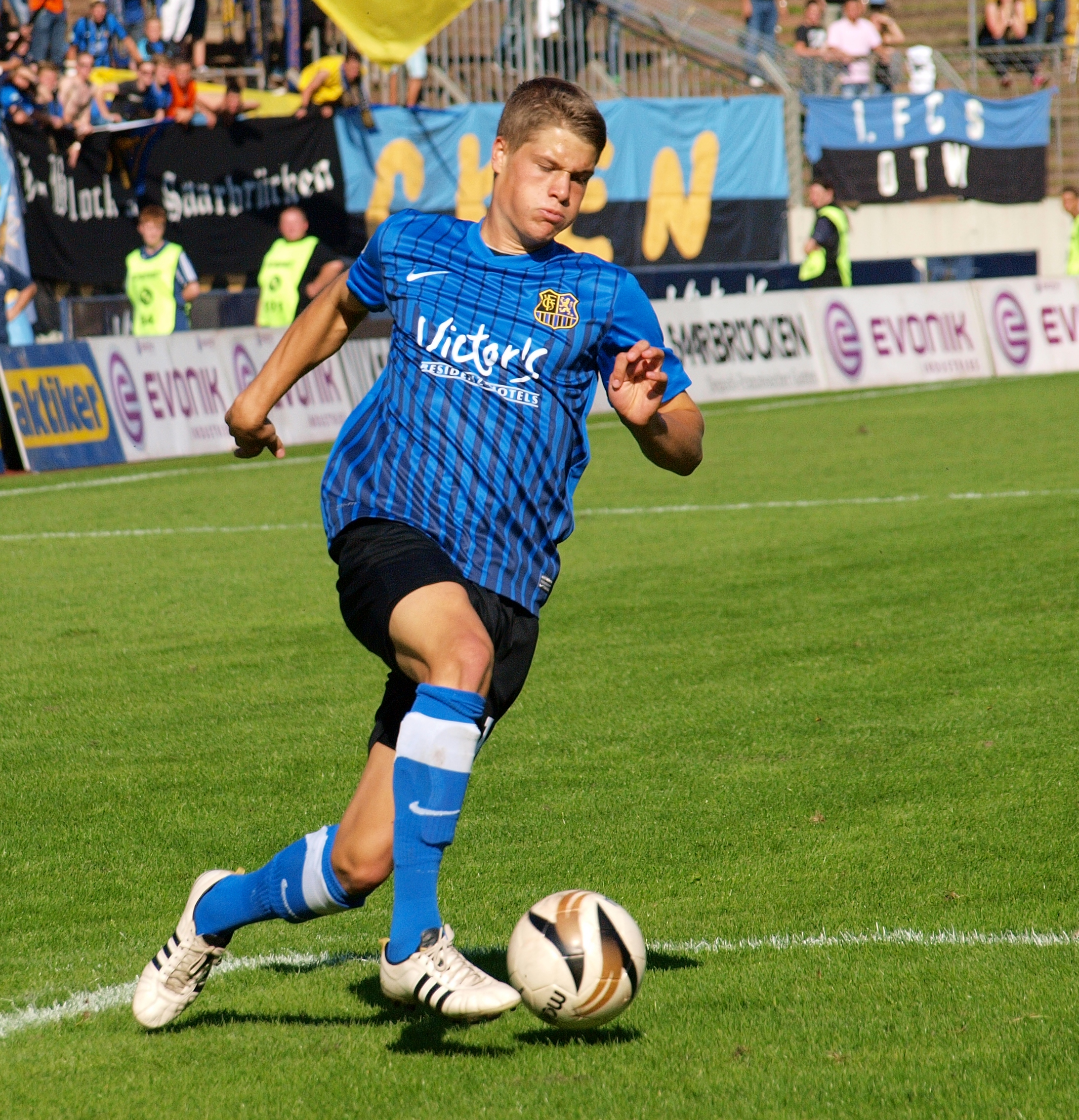
- Wurtz playing for 1. FC Saarbrücken in 2011

Personal information
- Date of birth: 19 June 1992 (age 34)
- Place of birth: Neunkirchen, Germany
- Height: 1.82 m (6 ft 0 in)
- Positions: Attacking midfielder; forward

Youth career
- 1996–2005: DJK Bexbach
- 2005–2011: 1. FC Saarbrücken

Senior career*
Years	Team	Apps	(Gls)
2011	1. FC Saarbrücken II	3	(1)
2011–2012	1. FC Saarbrücken	36	(9)
2012–2013	Werder Bremen II	29	(15)
2012–2014	Werder Bremen	2	(0)
2013–2014	→ SC Paderborn (loan)	22	(6)
2014–2016	Greuther Fürth	42	(2)
2016–2018	VfL Bochum	61	(9)
2018–2020	Darmstadt 98	23	(1)
2020–2023	SV Wehen Wiesbaden	79	(14)
2023	Honka	14	(3)
2024	SC Freiburg II	0	(0)

International career
2012-2013	Germany U20	5	(0)
- * Club domestic league appearances and goals as of 1 July 2024

Johannes Wurtz (born 19 June 1992) is a German professional footballer who plays as an attacking midfielder or forward.

== Career ==
Wurtz came through 1. FC Saarbrücken's youth setup, and made his first-team debut in July 2011, when he replaced Ufuk Özbek in a DFB-Pokal match against Erzgebirge Aue. He joined Bundesliga club Werder Bremen in July 2012. A year later he joined 2. Bundesliga side SC Paderborn, on loan.

On 14 April 2014, SC Paderborn announced that Wurtz would transfer to Greuther Fürth for next season and that he would be left out of the squad for Paderborn's match against Greuther Fürth, who competed with Paderborn for promotion to the Bundesliga, six days later. Although he was taken back in the squad afterwards he only played five minutes at one substitution in the remaining three matches of the season. At the end of the season Paderborn was promoted and Fürth stayed in the 2. Bundesliga.

At Greuther Fürth Wurtz signed a three-year contract expiring June 2017. Werder Bremen, which still held the transfer rights, received a transfer free of reportedly €250,000 and secured a repurchase option.

In August 2018, Wurtz joined 2. Bundesliga side Darmstadt 98 from league rivals VfL Bochum on a three-year contract.

He moved to SV Wehen Wiesbaden on a one-year contract in August 2020.

After a short stint in Finland with FC Honka in 2023, Wurtz returned to Germany and signed with SC Freiburg II on 3 January 2024 on a short contract.

== Career statistics ==
As of 19 August 2020

Appearances and goals by club, season and competition
Club	Season	League			Cup		Other		Total	
Club	Season	Division	Apps	Goals	Apps	Goals	Apps	Goals	Apps	Goals
1. FC Saarbrücken II	2010–11	Oberliga Rheinland-Pfalz/Saar	2	0	—		—		2	0
1. FC Saarbrücken II	2011–12	Oberliga Rheinland-Pfalz/Saar	1	1	—		—		1	1
1. FC Saarbrücken II	Total		3	1	0	0	0	0	3	1
1. FC Saarbrücken	2011–12	3. Liga	36	9	1	0	—		37	9
Werder Bremen II	2012–13	Regionalliga Nord	26	14	—		—		26	14
Werder Bremen II	2013–14	Regionalliga Nord	3	1	—		—		3	1
Werder Bremen II	Total		29	15	0	0	0	0	29	15
Werder Bremen	2012–13	Bundesliga	2	0	0	0	—		2	0
SC Paderborn	2013–14	2. Bundesliga	22	6	1	0	—		23	6
Greuther Fürth	2014–15	2. Bundesliga	22	1	1	0	—		23	1
Greuther Fürth	2015–16	2. Bundesliga	20	1	1	0	—		21	1
Greuther Fürth	Total		42	2	2	0	—		44	2
VfL Bochum	2016–17	2. Bundesliga	33	8	1	0	—		34	8
VfL Bochum	2017–18	2. Bundesliga	27	1	2	0	—		29	1
VfL Bochum	2018–19	2. Bundesliga	1	0	1	0	—		2	0
VfL Bochum	Total		61	9	4	0	0	0	65	9
Darmstadt 98	2018–19	2. Bundesliga	22	1	1	0	—		23	1
Darmstadt 98	2019–20	2. Bundesliga	1	0	1	0	—		2	0
Darmstadt 98	Total		23	1	2	0	—		25	1
SV Wehen Wiesbaden	2020–21	3. Liga	18	5	1	0	3 (Note: Appearances in Hessian Cup)	3	22	8
SV Wehen Wiesbaden	2021–22	3. Liga	27	3	1	0	1	0	29	3
SV Wehen Wiesbaden	2022–23	3. Liga	36	7	0	0	2	1	38	8
SV Wehen Wiesbaden	Total		81	15	2	0	6	4	89	19
Honka	2023	Veikkausliiga	14	3	2	0	0	0	16	3
SC Freiburg II	2023–24	3. Liga	0	0	0	0	–		0	0
Career total			313	61	14	0	6	4	333	65
