= Thür =

- Municipality
- Coat of arms

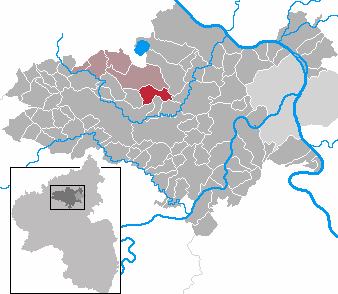
- Location of Thür within Mayen-Koblenz district
- Interactive map of Thür
- Location within Germany Location within Rhineland-Palatinate
- Coordinates: 50°21′33″N 7°16′39″E
- Country: Germany
- State: Rhineland-Palatinate
- District: Mayen-Koblenz
- Municipal assoc.: Mendig

Government
  - Mayor (2019–24): Rainer Hilger (CDU)

Area
  - Total: 8.25 km^{2} (3.19 sq mi)
- Elevation: 200 m (660 ft)

Population (2025-12-31)
  - Total: 1,560
  - Density: 189/km^{2} (490/sq mi)
- Time zone: UTC+01:00 (CET)
  - Summer (DST): UTC+02:00 (CEST)
- Postal codes: 56743
- Dialling codes: 02652
- Vehicle registration: MYK

Thür (German pronunciation: [tyːɐ̯]) is a municipality in the district of Mayen-Koblenz in Rhineland-Palatinate, western Germany.

== Transport Links ==
The village has a train stop which is located at the Cross Eifel Railway which is served by line RB23 (Limburg - Diez - Bad Ems - Koblenz - Andernach - Mayen) as well RB38 (Andernach - Mayen - Kaisersesch), both operated by section Lahn-Eifel-Bahn of Deutsche Bahn. The village is located in the zone number 389 of the transport association VRM.
