= 2019–20 Kayserispor season =

Kayserispor
2019–20 season
- Chairman: Berna Gözbaşı
- Manager: Robert Prosinečki
- Stadium: Kadir Has Stadium
- Süper Lig: 17th
- Turkish Cup: Round of 16
Home colours	Away colours	Third colours

The 2019–20 season was Kayserispor's 54th year in existence. In addition to the domestic league, Kayserispor participated in the Turkish Cup.

== Squad ==
As of 6 February 2020.

Note: Flags indicate national team as defined under FIFA eligibility rules; some limited exceptions apply. Players may hold more than one non-FIFA nationality.

No.	Pos.	Nation	Player
1	GK	TUR	Hakan Arıkan
2	DF	TUR	Emirhan Civelek (On loan from Galatasaray)
3	DF	TUR	Emre Taşdemir (On loan from Galatasaray)
5	DF	TUN	Aymen Abdennour
8	MF	TUR	Hasan Hüseyin Acar (captain)
10	FW	BRA	Pedro Henrique
11	FW	UKR	Artem Kravets (vice-captain)
12	GK	TUR	Umut Eren Tunç (U-19)
13	DF	POR	Miguel Lopes
14	MF	TUR	Emre Demir (Turkey U-17) (U-19)
16	GK	TUR	Doğan Alemdar (Turkey U-18) (U-19)
17	FW	TUR	Nurettin Korkmaz (U-19)
18	MF	BIH	Zoran Kvržić
19	FW	TUR	Ömer Uzun (U-19)
20	MF	TUR	Aksel Aktaş
21	FW	BIH	Muris Mešanović (On loan from FK Mladá Boleslav)
24	DF	TUR	Mert Kula
25	DF	TUR	Alpay Çelebi (On loan from Beşiktaş)
26	DF	TUR	Mustafa Buğra Ilter (U-19)
27	MF	CIV	Brice Dja Djédjé
28	MF	TUR	Mehmet Eray Özbek (U-19)
32	DF	TUR	Yasir Subaşı
33	GK	ROU	Silviu Lung Jr.
35	MF	TUR	Ahmet Kürşat Kılıç (U-19)
36	DF	TUR	Ahmet Zekeriyya Kartal (U-19)

No.	Pos.	Nation	Player
37	MF	TUR	Furkan Şahin (U-19)
38	MF	NED	Ben Rienstra
39	FW	NED	Ümran Zambak (U-19)
40	MF	NED	Bora Barlas (U-19)
43	MF	GHA	Bernard Mensah
44	DF	TUR	Oğuzhan Çapar
45	FW	TUR	Taner Gümüş (U-19)
48	DF	TUR	Barış Emirhan Doğan (U-19)
55	DF	TUR	Sinan Ayhan (U-19)
61	FW	TUR	Ziya Alkurt
66	DF	TUR	Ömer Memiş (U-19)
67	GK	TUR	Eray İşcan
70	FW	TUR	Enver Cenk Şahin
78	DF	TUR	Osman Can Çötür (U-19)
84	DF	ROU	Cristian Săpunaru
86	DF	BRA	Diego Ângelo (On loan from Antalyaspor)
88	MF	BRA	Gustavo Campanharo
90	MF	NGA	Anthony Uzodimma (U-19)
92	FW	CRO	Mario Šitum
95	GK	TUR	İsmail Çipe (On loan from Galatasaray)
97	FW	TUR	Selahattin Seyhun (U-19)
98	MF	TUR	Furkan Polat (U-19)
--	MF	TUR	Hakan Çıtak (U-19)
--	DF	TUR	Abdullah Gürbüz (U-19)
--	GK	TUR	Berke Kaya (U-19)

(U-19)= eligible to play for Kayserispor under-19

== Süper Lig ==
=== League table ===
Pos	Team	Pld	W	D	L	GF	GA	GD	Pts
14	Denizlispor	34	9	8	17	31	48	−17	35 (Note: Head-to-head points: Denizlispor 4, Rizespor 1)
15	Rizespor	34	10	5	19	38	57	−19	35
16	Yeni Malatyaspor	34	8	8	18	44	51	−7	32 (Note: Head-to-head points: Yeni Malatyaspor 6, Kayserispor 5, Ankaragücü 5. Head-to-head goal difference: Yeni Malatyaspor +6, Kayserispor -3, Ankaragücü -3. Head-to-head goals scored: Yeni Malatyaspor 9, Kayserispor 4, Ankaragücü 3.)
17	Kayserispor	34	8	8	18	40	72	−32	32
18	Ankaragücü	34	7	11	16	31	56	−25	32

Source: Süper Lig, Soccerway
Rules for classification: 1) Points; 2) Head-to-head points; 3) Head-to-head goal difference; 4) Head-to-head goals scored; 5) Goal difference; 6) Goals scored; 7) Play-off.

=== Results summary ===
Overall								Home						Away					
Pld	W	D	L	GF	GA	GD	Pts	W	D	L	GF	GA	GD	W	D	L	GF	GA	GD
32	8	8	16	39	69	−30	32	6	6	4	22	22	0	2	2	12	17	47	−30

Source: TFF

=== Results by round ===
Round	1	2	3	4	5	6	7	8	9	10	11	12	13	14	15	16	17	18	19	20	21	22	23	24	25	26	27	28	29	30	31	32	33	34
Ground	H	A	H	A	H	A	A	H	A	H	A	H	A	H	A	H	A	A	H	A	H	A	H	H	A	H	A	H	A	H	A	H	A	H
Result	L	D	L	D	D	L	L	D	L	W	L	L	L	W	L	L	L	L	D	L	D	W	D	W	L	W	L	W	W	W	L	D		
Position	14	13	15	15	17	17	18	18	18	18	18	18	18	17	17	18	18	18	18	18	18	18	18	18	18	18	18	17	16	14	16	17		

Updated to match(es) played on 16 July 2020. Source: TFF.org
A = Away; H = Home; W = Win; D = Draw; L = Loss

== Matches ==
August 17, 2019 1	Kayserispor	0 - 1	Alanyaspor	Kayseri
21.45	Atila Turan (yellow card) 19'; Aymen Abdennour (yellow card) 77'; Pedro Henrique Konzen (yellow card) 80'; Bernard Mensah (yellow card) 24'	Report	86' (yellow card) 87' Papiss Cissé	Stadium: Kadir Has Şehir Stadyumu; Referee: Tugay Kaan Numanoğlu; Assistant referees: Mustafa Sönmez, Mehmet Salih Mazlum; Fourth official: Mustafa Kürşad Filiz; Fifth official: Halis Özkahya, Emre Malok

August 24, 2019 2	MKE Ankaragücü	1 - 1	Kayserispor	Ankara
19.15	Aydın Karabulut (yellow card) 38'; Dever Orgill 59' (yellow card) 77'; Stelios Kitsiou (yellow card) 90'	Report	(yellow card) 43' Atila Turan; 90' Umut Bulut	Stadium: Eryaman Stadium; Referee: Ali Şansalan; Assistant referees: İlker Takpak, İbrahim Bozbey; Fourth official: Sinan Derici; Fifth official: Bahattin Şimşek, Çağdaş Altay

August 30, 2019 3	Kayserispor	2 - 3	Galatasaray	Kayseri
20.30	Brice Dja Djédjé (yellow card) 34'; Pedro Henrique 37' (yellow card) 70' (yellow card) 73' (red card); Aymen Abdennour (yellow card) 54' (yellow card) 65' (red card); Bernard Mensah (yellow card) 69'; Umut Bulut (yellow card) 90' (goal) 90+1' (yellow card) 90+5' (red card)	Report	(yellow card) 34' (goal) 66' (pen.) Younès Belhanda; (yellow card) 69' Mariano; (yellow card) 75' Ömer Bayram; (yellow card) 79' Marcão; 87' Ryan Babel; (yellow card) 89' (yellow card) 89' (red card) Emre Mor; 90+8' Adem Büyük	Stadium: Kadir Has Şehir Stadyumu; Referee: Mustafa Öğretmenoğlu; Assistant referees: Ali Saygın Ögel, Samet Çavuş; Fourth official: Ramazan Keleş; Fifth official: Volkan Bayarslan, İbrahim Çağlar Uyarcan

September 14, 2019 4	Antalyaspor	2 - 2	Kayserispor	Antalya
20.00	Gustavo Blanco Leschuk 2'; Ufuk Akyol (yellow card) 36'; Nazım Sangaré (yellow card) 40'; Serdar Özkan 50' (yellow card) 60'	Report	44' (pen.) Emmanuel Adebayor; (yellow card) 50' Brice Dja Djédjé; 74' Benoît Poulain	Stadium: New Antalya Stadium; Referee: Fırat Aydınus; Assistant referees: Kemal Yılmaz, Süleyman Özay; Fourth official: Mert Güzenge; Fifth official: Özgür Yankaya, Mert Güzenge

September 21, 2019 5	Kayserispor	1 - 1	Denizlispor	Kayseri
17.30	Pedro Henrique Konzen 13'; Yasir Subaşı (yellow card) 21'; Emmanuel Adebayor (yellow card) 39'	Report	(yellow card) 45' Cristian Săpunaru; 74' Radosław Murawski	Stadium: Kadir Has Şehir Stadyumu; Attendance: 8.782; Referee: Hüseyin Göçek; Assistant referees: Alpaslan Dedeş, Erdem Bayık; Fourth official: Erkan Engin; Fifth official: Ali Palabıyık, Serkan Olguncan

September 29, 2019 6	Konyaspor	2 - 1	Kayserispor	Konya
14.00	Alper Uludağ (yellow card) 41'; Deni Milošević 45'; Marin Aničić (yellow card) 70'; Marko Jevtović 90'; Nejc Skubic (yellow card) 90+3'; Ömer Ali Şahiner (yellow card) 90+5'	Report	9' (k.k.) Levan Shengelia; (yellow card) 10' Bilal Başaçıkoğlu; (yellow card) 89' Miguel Lopes; (yellow card) 90+2' Silviu Lung Jr. (yellow card) 90+5' Pedro Henrique Konzen	Stadium: Büyükşehir Belediye Stadyumu; Attendance: 14.671; Referee: Alper Ulusoy; Assistant referees: Volkan Ahmet Narinç, Bahtiyar Birinci; Fourth official: Batuhan Gültek; Fifth official: Hakan Ceylan, Çağraş Altay

October 5, 2019 7	Göztepe	4 - 0	Kayserispor	İzmir
17.30	Alpaslan Öztürk 7'; Serdar Gürler (penalty missed) 34'; Soner Aydoğdu 42'; Stefano Napoleoni 45', 50'; Titi (yellow card) 74'	Report	(yellow card) 41' Benoît Poulain; (yellow card) 29' Ben Rienstra	Stadium: Bornova Stadium; Attendance: 6.803; Referee: Cüneyt Çakır; Assistant referees: Tarık Ongun, Aleks Taşçıoğlu; Fourth official: Mustafa Kürşad Filiz; Fifth official: Mete Kalkavan, Kemal Yılmaz

October 20, 2019 8	Kayserispor	1 - 1	Kasımpaşa	Kayseri
14.00	Bernard Mensah (yellow card) 23'; Hasan Hüseyin Acar (yellow card) 46'; Pedro Henrique Konzen (yellow card) 54' (goal) 56'; Miguel Lopes (yellow card) 74'; Umut Bulut (yellow card) 84'	Report	6' Mame Baba Thiam; (yellow card) 80' Loret Sadiku; (yellow card) 90+1' Veysel Sarı; (yellow card) 90+3' Aytaç Kara	Stadium: Kadir Has Şehir Stadyumu; Attendance: 7.941; Referee: Atilla Karaoğlan; Assistant referees: Mehmet Metin, Kamil Çetin; Fourth official: Hasan Avcı; Fifth official: Sarper Barış Saka, Kutluhan Bilgiç

October 27, 2019 9	Yeni Malatyaspor	4 - 0	Kayserispor	Malatya
14.00	Moryké Fofana (yellow card) 9'; Mitchell Donald 15'; Adis Jahović 77'; Thievy Bifouma 85'	Report	(yellow card) 40' Hasan Hüseyin Acar; (yellow card) 68' Pedro Henrique Konzen; (yellow card) 76' Ben Rienstra	Stadium: Malatya Arena; Attendance: 7.994; Referee: Zorbay Küçük; Assistant referees: Ekrem Kan-Deniz Caner Özalan; Fourth official: Yakup Özhan; Fifth official: Yaşar Kemal Uğurlu, Kerem Ersoy

November 3, 2019 10	Kayserispor	1 - 0	Fenerbahçe	Kayseri
19.00	Umut Bulut 58'; Yasir Subaşı (yellow card) 86'	Report	(yellow card) 61' Garry Rodrigues; (yellow card) 75' Tolga Ciğerci; (yellow card) 82' Serdar Aziz	Stadium: Kadir Has Şehir Stadyumu; Attendance: 18.147; Referee: Arda Kardeşler; Assistant referees: Erdinç Sezertam, Süleyman Özay; Fourth official: Turgut Doman; Fifth official: Tugay Kaan Numanoğlu, Esat Sancaktar

November 9, 2019 11	Gençlerbirliği	2 - 1	Kayserispor	Ankara
15.00	Aymen Abdennour 14' (o.g.); Giovanni Sio (yellow card) 61'; Bogdan Stancu 81'; Daniel Candeias (yellow card) 84'	Report	71' Emre Demir	Stadium: Eryaman Stadium; Attendance: 3.720; Referee: Ali Şansalan; Assistant referees: Candaş Elbil-Mehmet Salim Mazlum; Fourth official: Yasin Kol

November 24, 2019 12	Kayserispor	1 - 4	Sivasspor	Kayseri
14.00	Pedro Henrique Konzen 43'; Şamil Çinaz (yellow card) 61'; Pedro Henrique Konzen (yellow card) 70'	Report	23' Fernando; (yellow card) 61' Fatih Aksoy; 68' Emre Kılınç; 74' Erdoğan Yeşilyurt; 90+4' Erdoğan Yeşilyurt	Stadium: Kadir Has Şehir Stadyumu; Attendance: 11.073; Referee: Halis Özkahya; Assistant referees: Ali Saygın Ögel-Samet Çavuş; Fourth official: Bilal Köseoğlu

December 2, 2019 13	Beşiktaş	4 - 1	Kayserispor	Istanbul
20.00	Atiba Hutchinson 20'; Burak Yılmaz 30', 90'; Gökhan Gönül 41'; Oğuzhan Özyakup (yellow card) 74'; Güven Yalçın (yellow card) 90'	Report	(yellow card) 64' Nurettin Korkmaz; 86' Emmanuel Adebayor	Stadium: Vodafone Park; Attendance: 25.950; Referee: Ümit Öztürk; Assistant referees: Osman Gökhan Bilir, Kamil Çetin; Fourth official: Erkan Engin; Fifth official: Volkan Bayarslan, Ceyhun Sesigüzel

December 9, 2019 14	Kayserispor	1 - 0	Çaykur Rizespor	Kayseri
20.00	Artem Kravets 9'; Hasan Hüseyin Acar (yellow card) 69'; Silviu Lung Jr. (yellow card) 89'	Report	(yellow card) 37' Amedej Vetrih; (yellow card) 68' Mohamed Abarhoun; (yellow card) 81' Orhan Ovacıklı	Stadium: Kadir Has Şehir Stadyumu; Attendance: 4.500; Referee: Fırat Aydınus; Assistant referees: Aleks Taşçıoğlu-Erdem Bayık; Fourth official: Çağdaş Altay

December 15, 2019 15	Gaziantep	3 - 0	Kayserispor	Gaziantep
14.00	Raman Chibsah (yellow card) 5'; Güray Vural 67' (yellow card) 69'; Olarenwaju Kayode 72', 90'	Report	(yellow card) 75' Mert Kula; (yellow card) 90' Miguel Lopes	Stadium: New Gaziantep Stadium; Attendance: 4.695; Referee: Özgür Yankaya; Assistant referees: Mehmet Metin, Yusuf Bozdoğan; Fourth official: Burak Pakkan; Fifth official: Halil Umut Meler, Kemal Yılmaz

December 22, 2019 16	Kayserispor	1 - 4	İstanbul Başakşehir	Kayseri
16.30	Aymen Abdennour (yellow card) 27'; Artem Kravets 38'; Brice Dja Djédjé (yellow card) 48'; Miguel Lopes (yellow card) 64'	Report	5' (o.g.) Miguel Lopes; 10' (o.g.) Mert Kula; 48' Demba Ba; (yellow card) 75' Gaël Clichy; (yellow card) 81' Enzo Crivelli; 90+3' Danijel Aleksić	Stadium: Kadir Has Şehir Stadyumu; Attendance: 7.124; Referee: Ali Şansalan; Assistant referees: İsmail Şencan-Mehmet Kısal; Fourth official: Bayram Başkan; Fifth official: Ümit Öztürk, Sarper Barış Saka

December 28, 2019 17	Trabzonspor	6 - 2	Kayserispor	Trabzon
17.30	Alexander Sørloth 7'; Anthony Nwakaeme 37'; Daniel Sturridge 47'; Daniel Sturridge 66'; Abdülkadir Parmak 72'; Alexander Sørloth 90+3'	Report	43' Ömer Uzun; (yellow card) 65' Mert Kula; (yellow card) 70' Yasir Subaşı; 82' Artem Kravets	Stadium: Şenol Güneş Stadium; Attendance: 23.294; Referee: Hüseyin Göçek; Assistant referees: Esat Sancaktar-Serkan Ok; Fourth official: Mustafa İlker Coşkun

January 18, 2020 18	Alanyaspor	5 - 1	Kayserispor	Alanya, Antalya
14.00	Georgios Tzavellas 38'; Anastasios Bakasetas 59'; Papiss Cissé 62'; Júnior Fernándes 84', 90+2'	Report	(red card) 45+1' Zoran Kvrzic; Hasan Hüseyin Acar (yellow card) 45+3'; Brice Dja Djédjé (yellow card) 55'; Pedro Henrique Konzen 87'	Stadium: Bahçeşehir Okulları Stadium; Attendance: 3.405; Referee: Ali Palabıyık; Assistant referees: Serkan Olguncan, Serkan Çimen; Fourth official: Bilal Köseoğlu; Fifth official: Özgüç Türkalp, Yasin Kol

January 25, 2020 19	Kayserispor	1 - 1	MKE Ankaragücü	Kayseri
14.00	Bernard Mensah 23' (pen.) (yellow card) 54'; Emre Demir (yellow card) 44'; Gustavo Campanharo (yellow card) 68'; Pedro Henrique (yellow card) 76'; Ben Rienstra (yellow card) 90+3'	Report	Cebrail Karayel (yellow card) 17' (yellow card) 48' (red card); Tiago Pinto (yellow card) 28'; Sedat Ağçay (yellow card) 29'; Héctor Canteros (yellow card) 33'; Alihan Kubalas 68' (yellow card) 90+1'	Stadium: Kadir Has Şehir Stadyumu; Attendance: 6.747; Referee: Cüneyt Çakır; Assistant referees: Alpaslan Dedeş, Candaş Elbil; Fourth official: İlker Yasin Avcı; Fifth official: Suat Arslanboğa, Kutluhan Bilgiç

February 2, 2020 20	Galatasaray	4 - 1	Kayserispor	Istanbul
19:00	Adem Büyük 5'; Ryan Donk 21'; Younès Belhanda (yellow card) 49'; Sofiane Feghouli 64', 89'; Ömer Bayram (yellow card) 78'	Report	(yellow card) 55' Brice Dja Djédjé; 69' Muris Mešanović	Stadium: Türk Telekom Stadium; Attendance: 32.535; Referee: Zorbay Küçük; Assistant referees: Mustafa Emre Eyisoy, Tarık Ongun; Fourth official: Direnç Tonusluoğlu; Fifth official: Özgüç Türkalp, İbrahim Çağlar Uyarcan

February 9, 2020 21	Kayserispor	2 - 2	Antalyaspor	Kayseri
13.30	Emre Taşdemir (yellow card) 13'; Bernard Mensah 41' (pen.); Pedro Henrique Konzen 46' (yellow card) 75'; Cristian Săpunaru (yellow card) 58'; Gustavo Campanharo (yellow card) 90+1'	Report	(yellow card) 3' Hakan Özmert; 45' (pen.) (yellow card) 58' Sinan Gümüş; (yellow card) 58' Veysel Sarı; 83' Fredy; (yellow card) 90+1' Lukas Podolski	Stadium: Kadir Has Şehir Stadyumu; Attendance: 5.892; Referee: Koray Gençerler; Assistant referees: Samet Çiçek, Abdullah Bora Özkara; Fourth official: Hasan Avcı; Fifth official: Tugay Kaan Numanoğlu, Mustafa Kürşad Filiz

February 15, 2020 22	Denizlispor	0 - 1	Kayserispor	Denizli
14.00		Report	69' Cristian Săpunaru	Stadium: Atatürk Stadyumu; Attendance: 4.761; Referee: Özgür Yankaya; Assistant referees: Mehmet Metin, İlker Takpak; Fourth official: Mustafa Aydın; Fifth official: Halis Özkahya, Ekrem Kan

February 22, 2020 23	Kayserispor	2 - 2	Konyaspor	Kayseri
14.00	Bernard Mensah (yellow card) 22'; Cristian Săpunaru (yellow card) 23'; Artem Kravets 45+2'; Pedro Henrique Konzen 87'; Cenk Şahin (yellow card) 90+2'	Report	8' Ömer Ali Şahiner; (yellow card) 23' Deni Milošević; (yellow card) 40' , (goal) 44' Amir Hadžiahmetović; (yellow card) 65' Róbert Mak; (yellow card) 74' Jens Jønsson; (yellow card) 76' Thuram	Stadium: Kadir Has Şehir Stadyumu; Attendance: 7.262; Referee: Arda Kardeşler; Assistant referees: Cevdet Kömürcüoğlu, Bahtiyar Birinci; Fourth official: Emre Kargın; Fifth official: Emre Malok Murat Erdoğan

March 2, 2020 24	Kayserispor	1 - 0	Göztepe	Kayseri
20.00	Artem Kravets (yellow card) 13'; Diego Ângelo (yellow card) 55'; Muris Mesanovic 70'; Pedro Henrique (yellow card) 83'; Aksel Aktas (yellow card) 89'	Report	(yellow card) 51' Serdar Gürler	Stadium: Kadir Has Şehir Stadyumu; Attendance: 6.969; Referee: Mete Kalkavan; Assistant referees: Ceyhun Sesigüzel, Esat Sancaktar; Fourth official: İlker Yasin Avcı; Fifth official: Özgüç Türkalp, Burak Pakkan

March 8, 2020 25	Kasımpaşa	5 - 1	Kayserispor	Istanbul
13.30	Bengali-Fodé Koita 6'; Zvonimir Šarlija 11'; Dieumerci Ndongala 30'; Aytaç Kara (yellow card) 40' (goal) 83'; Mickaël Tirpan (yellow card) 62'; Yusuf Erdoğan 87'; Yassine Meriah (yellow card) 90+1'	Report	59' (yellow card) 90' Bernard Mensah; (yellow card) 70' Gustavo Campanharo; (yellow card) 90+1' Cristian Săpunaru; (yellow card) 90+3' Aksel Aktas	Stadium: Recep Tayyip Erdoğan Stadium; Attendance: 2.564; Referee: Hüseyin Göçek; Assistant referees: Mehmet Salih Mazlum, Deniz Caner Özaral; Fourth official: Burak Taşkınsoy; Fifth official: Ümit Öztürk, Mustafa Kürşad Filiz

March 15, 2020 26	Kayserispor	2 - 1	Yeni Malatyaspor	Kayseri
13.30	Muris Mešanović 22'; Pedro Henrique Konzen 42' (yellow card) 72'; Bernard Mensah (penalty missed) 45+3'; Zoran Kvržić (yellow card) 50'; Gustavo Campanharo (yellow card) 90+2'	Report	(yellow card) 45+3' Arturo Mina; 70' Viðar Örn Kjartansson	Stadium: Kadir Has Şehir Stadyumu; Attendance: 0 Referee: Ali Şansalan; Assistant referees: Mehmet Cem Satman, İlker Takpak; Fourth official: Adem Cinek; Fifth official: Burak Şeker, Emre Kargın

June 12, 2020 27	Fenerbahçe	2 - 1	Kayserispor	Istanbul
21.00	Ozan Tufan (red card) 14'; Emre Belözoğlu (yellow card) 15'; Vedat Muriqi 87' (pen.); Luiz Gustavo 88'	Report	59' (yellow card) 82' Bernard Mensah; (yellow card) 78' Cristian Săpunaru	Stadium: Şükrü Saracoğlu Stadyumu; Attendance: 0 Referee: Atilla Karaoğlan; Assistant referees: Volkan Ahmet Narinç, İbrahim Bozbey; Fourth official: Cihan Aydın; Fifth official: Bahattin Şimşek, Erkan Engin

June 20, 2020 28	Kayserispor	2 - 0	Gençlerbirliği	Kayseri
18.30	Pedro Henrique 36'; Gustavo Campanharo (yellow card) 72'; Silviu Lung (yellow card) 73'; Artem Kravets 89' (yellow card) 90+2'; Cenk Şahin (yellow card) 90+2'	Report	(yellow card) 41' Giovanni Sio; (yellow card) 49' Baiano; (yellow card) 90+2' Berat Özdemir	Stadium: Kadir Has Şehir Stadyumu; Attendance: 0 Referee: Ümit Öztürk; Assistant referees: Samet Çavuş, Bahtiyar Birinci; Fourth official: Ramazan Keleş; Fifth official: Halis Özkahya, Yakup Özhan

June 28, 2020 29	Sivasspor	0 - 2	Kayserispor	Sivas
18.30	Caner Osmanpaşa (yellow card) 6'; Mert Hakan Yandaş (penalty missed) 12'; Fatih Aksoy (yellow card) 37'; Ziya Erdal (yellow card) 73'	Report	(yellow card) 13' (goal) 83' (pen.) Bernard Mensah; 45+6' Hasan Hüseyin Acar; (yellow card) 73' Muris Mešanović; (yellow card) 76' Yasir Subaşı; (yellow card) 89' Miguel Lopes	Stadium: New Sivas 4 Eylül Stadium; Attendance: 0 Referee: Mete Kalkavan; Assistant referees: Ceyhun Sesigüzel, Esat Sancaktar; Fourth official: Sarper Barış Saka; Fifth official: Koray Gençerler, Burak Pakkan

July 6, 2020 30	Kayserispor	3 - 1	Beşiktaş	Kayseri
21.00	Hasan Hüseyin Acar 51', 83'; Cenk Şahin (yellow card) 53'; Artem Kravets 86'	Report	(yellow card) 47' Abdoulay Diaby; 74' Atiba Hutchinson	Stadium: Kadir Has Şehir Stadyumu; Attendance: 0 Referee: Arda Kardeşler; Assistant referees: Süleyman Özay, Mehmet Cem Hanoğlu; Fourth official: Bülent Birincioğlu; Fifth official: Atilla Karaoğlan, Erkan Engin

July 9, 2020 31	Çaykur Rizespor	3 - 2	Kayserispor	Rize
18.30	Braian Samudio 11'; Orhan Ovacıklı (yellow card) 30'; Amedej Vetrih (yellow card) 43'; Denys Harmash 90+2'; Ivanildo Fernandes 90+4'	Report	32' Diego Ângelo; (yellow card) 53' (yellow card) 75' (red card) Gustavo Campanharo; (yellow card) 83' Hasan Hüseyin Acar; 87' (pen.) Artem Kravets	Stadium: Yeni Rize Şehir Stadium; Attendance: 0 Referee: Ali Palabıyık; Assistant referees: Serkan Olguncan, Mehmet Cem Satman; Fourth official: Alper Çetin; Fifth official: Cüneyt Çakır, Hakan Ceylan

July 13, 2020 32	Kayserispor	1 - 1	Gaziantep	Kayseri
18.30	Zoran Kvržić (yellow card) 54'; Bernard Mensah (red card) 74'; Diego Ângelo (red card) 87'; Artem Kravets 90+3'	Report	62' Alexandru Maxim; (yellow card) 74' Jefferson Nogueira Júnior; (yellow card) 85' Muhammet Demir; (yellow card) 88' Bartłomiej Pawłowski; (yellow card) 90+2' Júnior Morais	Stadium: Kadir Has Şehir Stadyumu; Attendance: 0 Referee: Halil Umut Meler; Assistant referees: Mustafa Emre Eyisoy, Cevdet Kömürcüoğlu; Fourth official: Ramazan Keleş; Fifth official: Koray Gençerler, Emre Malok

July 19, 2020 33	İstanbul Başakşehir	1 - 0	Kayserispor	Istanbul
21.00		Report		Stadium: Başakşehir Fatih Terim Stadium; Attendance: 0 Referee: Ali Şansalan; Assistant referees: Kerem Ersoy, Serkan Ok; Fourth official: Onur Özütoprak

July 2020 34	Kayserispor	1 - 2	Trabzonspor	Kayseri
		Report		Stadium: Kadir Has Şehir Stadyumu
