= 2019–20 Turkish Cup =

Ziraat Turkish Cup

Tournament details
- Country: Turkey
- Dates: 28 August 2019 – 29 July 2020
- Teams: 160

Final positions
- Champions: Trabzonspor
- Runners-up: Alanyaspor
- Semifinalists: Fenerbahçe; Antalyaspor
- Europa League: Alanyaspor

The 2019–20 Turkish Cup (Turkish: Türkiye Kupası) was the 58th season of the tournament. Ziraat Bankası was the sponsor of the tournament, thus the sponsored name was Ziraat Turkish Cup. The winners earned a berth in the group stage of the 2020–21 UEFA Europa League, and also qualified for the 2020 Turkish Super Cup.

== Competition format ==
round	Total clubs remaining	Clubs involved	Winners from previous round	New entries this round	Leagues entering at this round	Notes
First round	160	44	0	44	35 teams from Regional Amateur League and 9 teams that promoted to Third League	single leg; no seeds
Second round	138	66	22	44	Third League (44 teams)	single leg; no seeds
Third round	105	92	33	59	Second League (36 teams), First League (18 teams), Süper Lig (5 teams not entering in fourth and fifth rounds)	single leg; no seeds
Fourth round	59	54	46	8	Süper Lig (8 teams ranked 6th to 13th in 2018–19 season)	single leg; no seeds
Fifth round	32	32	27	5	Süper Lig (5 teams ranked 1st to 5th in 2018–19 season)	two legs; seeding applied
Round of 16	16	16	16	0		two legs; seeding applied
Quarter-finals	8	8	8	0		two legs; seeding applied
Semi-finals	4	4	4	0		two legs; seeding applied
Final	2	2	2	0		single leg; no seeds

== First round ==
- 9 Third League teams and 35 Regional Amateur League teams competed in this round. No seeds were applied in the single-leg round. First round schedule was announced on 23 August 2019.

Team 1	Score	Team 2
28 August 2019
Yozgatspor 1959 FK	4–2 (pen)	68 Aksaray Belediyespor
Malatya Yeşilyurt Belediyespor	5–0	12 Bingölspor
1954 Kelkit Belediyespor	5–4 (pen)	Çarşambaspor
Ağrı 1970 Spor	5–0	Iğdır Es Spor
Kastamonu Özel İdare Köy Hizmetleri	3–2 (pen)	Bartınspor
İçel İdmanyurdu	1–0	Kepez Belediyespor
Maltepespor	1–0	Hendekspor
1877 Alemdağspor	3–1	Modafenspor
Belediye Derincespor	2–3	Edirnespor
Somaspor	4–3 (pen)	Akşehir SK
29 August 2019
Yalova Kadıköy	3–4 (pen)	Bigaspor
Bursa Yıldırımspor	1–0	Bozüyük Vitraspor
TKİ Tavşanlı Linyitspor	1–0	Isparta 32 Spor
Karaman Belediyespor	1–0	Bucak Belediye Oğuzhanspor
Çubukspor Futbol A.Ş	1–3	Kırıkkale Büyük Anadoluspor
Kilis Belediyespor	1–0	Dersimspor
Mardin Büyükşehir Başakspor	2–1	Kahta 02 Spor
Muş Menderesspor	2–1	Bitlis Özgüzelderespor
Yüksekova Belediyespor	0–2	Siirt İl Özel İdaresi Spor
Kars 36 Spor	1–0	Hoçvanspor
Görelespor	1–0	Merzifonspor
1074 Çankırıspor	2–0	Boyabat 1868 Spor

== Second round ==
- Second round schedule was announced on 5 September 2019.

Team 1	Score	Team 2
10 September 2019
Kars 36 Spor	3–4 (pen)	Pazarspor
Yeni Orduspor	0–2	Fatsa Belediyespor
Kemerspor 2003	2–0	Karaman Belediyespor
1877 Alemdağspor	2–0	Çatalcaspor
Kocaelispor	3–1	Gölcükspor
İçel İdmanyurdu	1–0	Serik Belediyespor
11 September 2019
Ağrı 1970 SK	4–2 (pen)	Artvin Hopaspor
Batman Petrolspor	1–3	Mardin Büyükşehir Başakspor
Silivrispor	2–0	Bursa Yıldırımspor
Maltepespor	1–3	Erokspor
Şile Yıldızspor	1–2	Karacabey Belediyespor
Büyükçekmece Tepecikspor	1–0	Halide Edip Adıvarspor
Bayrampaşa	4–1	Bigaspor
1074 Çankırıspor	5–2	Kastamonu Özel İdare Köy Hizmetleri
Düzcespor	0–2	Darıca Gençlerbirliği
Çankaya FK	1–4	Kırıkkale Büyük Anadoluspor
Altındağ Belediyespor	1–2	Yozgatspor 1959 FK
Tokatspor	0–2	Erbaaspor
1954 Kelkit Belediyespor	1–0	Ofspor
Görelespor	3–0	Yomraspor
Malatya Yeşilyurt Belediyespor	0–5	Elazığ Belediyespor FK
Cizrespor	5–6 (pen)	Diyarbekirspor
Karaköprü Belediyespor	1–2	Siirt İl Özel İdaresi Spor
Erzinspor	3–1	Kilis Belediyespor
Nevşehir Belediyespor	0–1	Osmaniyespor FK
Kozanspor FK	0–3	Payasspor
Buca	3–5 (pen)	Nazilli Belediyespor
Fethiyespor	3–2	Kızılcabölükspor
Manisaspor	1–2	Turgutluspor
Tavşanlı Linyitspor	0–1	Somaspor
12 September 2019
Karşıyaka	2–4 (pen)	Muğlaspor
Sultanbeyli Belediyespor	0–1	Edirnespor
24 Erzincanspor	3–1	Muş Menderesspor

== Third round ==
- Third round schedule was announced on 18 September 2019.

Team 1	Score	Team 2
24 September
Yeni Çorumspor	0–1	Kasımpaşa
Mardin Büyükşehir Başakspor	0–2	Altay
Payasspor	1–1 (p 4–2)	Boluspor
1877 Alemdağspor	0–3	Sancaktepe
Edirnespor	3–4	BB Erzurum
Erokspor	1–0	Uşak Spor
Karacabey Belediyespor	2–0	Ümraniyespor
Muğlaspor	1–3	Bursaspor
Somaspor	1–2	Keçiörengücü
Altınordu	0–0 (p 4–2)	1922 Konyaspor
Şanlıurfaspor	0–1	24 Erzincanspor
Balıkesirspor	0–1	Vanspor
Adanaspor	3–1	Fethiyespor
Amed Sportif	4–1	Ağrı 1970 Spor
Osmanlıspor	1–1 (p 4–5)	İçel İdmanyurdu
Kocaelispor	0–1	Sivas Belediyespor
25 September
Afjet Afyonspor	0–1	Bayrampaşa
Ankara Demirpor	1–2	Başkent Akademi FK
Elazığspor	0–1	Tepecikspor
Fatsa Belediyespor	0–4	Samsunspor
Göztepe	3–0	Yozgatspor 1959
Hekimoğlu Trabzon	2–0	Adana Demirspor
Kahramanmaraşspor	1–4	Fatih Karagümrük
Kemerspor 2003	2–2 (p 4–2)	Sarıyer
Kırklarelispor	1–0	1954 Kelkit Belediyespor
Manisa FK	2–1	Elazığ Belediyespor FK
Menemenspor	2–1	Kırşehir Belediyespor
Pendikspor	0–3	Turgutluspor
Silivrispor	1–2	Kastamonuspor 1966
Ergene Velimeşespor	1–4	Eyüpspor
Zonguldak Kömürspor	2–2 (p 4–5)	Niğde Anadolu
İstanbulspor	3–2	Pazarspor
Bandırmaspor	2–1	Etimesgut Belediyespor
Diyarbekirspor	2–1	Eskişehirspor
Erzin Spor	1–4	İnegölspor
Tarsus İdman Yurdu	4–0	Darıca Gençlerbirliği
BB Bodrumspor	3–0	Erbaaspor
Görelespor	4–1	Giresunspor
Hacettepe	0–4	Denizlispor
Kardemir Karabükspor	1–1 (p 5–6)	Gümüşhanespor
Tuzlaspor	2–1	Nazilli Belediyespor
26 September
Kırıkkale Büyük Anadoluspor	0–4	Gaziantep F.K.
Gençlerbirliği	2–0	Osmaniye FK
Akhisarspor	0–0 (p 2–4)	Bayburt Özel İdare Spor
Hatayspor	0–1	Siirt İl Özel İdaresi Spor
Sakaryaspor	1–1 (p 3–4)	1074 Çankırıspor

== Fourth round ==
- Fourth round schedule was announced on 17 October 2019.

Team 1	Score	Team 2
Hekimoğlu Trabzon	3–0	Menemenspor
1074 Çankırıspor	1–3	Çaykur Rizespor
Altınordu	3–1	Amed
Niğde Anadolu	0–0 (2–3 p)	Antalyaspor
Eyüpspor	1–0 (a.e.t.)	Konyaspor
Altay	1–0	Görelespor
Adanaspor	3–0	Diyarbekirspor
Alanyaspor	3–0	İnegölspor
Vanspor FK	1–0	Sancaktepe
Gümüşhanespor	0–3	Samsunspor
Kastamonuspor 1966	1–1 (4–5 p)	24 Erzincanspor
Keçiörengücü	3–1	Siirt İl Özel İdaresi Spor
Payasspor	2–3	Manisa FK
Kemerspor 2003	2–3	Kasımpaşa
Karagümrük	4–1	Bandırmaspor
İstanbulspor	5–2 (a.e.t.)	Büyükçekmece Tepecikspor
Karacabey Belediyespor	1–3	Tuzlaspor
BB Erzurumspor	3–1	BB Bodrumspor
Gençlerbirliği	0–2	Esenler Erokspor
Göztepe	3–0	Sivas Belediyespor
Tarsus İdman Yurdu	1–3	Fenerbahçe
Bayburt Özel İdarespor	1–2	Bursaspor
Başkent Akademi	0–6	Sivasspor
Kırklarelispor	1–0	Ankaragücü
Kayserispor	2–0 (a.e.t.)	Bayrampaşa
Gaziantep F.K.	3–0	Turgutluspor
Denizlispor	4–1	İçel İdmanyurdu

== Bracket ==
Fifth round
Altay	1	1	2
Trabzonspor	2	4	6
Altınordu	3	2	5
Denizlispor	5	2	7
Bursaspor	2	2	4
BB Erzurumspor	4	1	5
Beşiktaş	3	0	3
24 Erzincanspor	0	2	2
Hekimoğlu Trabzon	0	0	0
İstanbul Başakşehir	1	2	3
Kırklarelispor (a)	2	2	4
Gaziantep F.K.	1	3	4
Kayserispor	3	3	6
Manisa FK	2	3	5
Fenerbahçe	4	2	6
İstanbulspor	0	0	0
Eyüpspor	0	2	2
Antalyaspor	3	2	5
Fatih Karagümrük	1	1	2
Göztepe	2	2	4
Esenler Erokspor	0	1	1
Sivasspor	2	0	2
Yeni Malatyaspor	3	2	5
Keçiörengücü	1	2	3
Alanyaspor	5	7	12
Adanaspor	1	1	2
Kasımpaşa	2	2	4
Vanspor	1	2	3
Çaykur Rizespor	3	1	4
Samsunspor	2	1	3
Galatasaray	0	4	4
Tuzlaspor	2	0	2

2nd Round
Trabzonspor (pen.)	2	0	2 (4)
Denizlispor	0	2	2 (2)
BB Erzurumspor	3	3	6
Beşiktaş	2	2	4
İstanbul Başakşehir	1	0	1
Kırklarelispor (a)	1	0	1
Kayserispor	0	0	0
Fenerbahçe	0	2	2
Antalyaspor	4	2	6
Göztepe	3	2	5
Sivasspor	4	1	5
Yeni Malatyaspor	0	2	2
Alanyaspor	3	2	5
Kasımpaşa	1	3	4
Çaykur Rizespor	1	1	2
Galatasaray	1	2	3

Quarterfinals
Trabzonspor	5	4	9
BB Erzurumspor	0	1	1
Kırklarelispor	0	0	0
Fenerbahçe	3	1	4
Antalyaspor (a)	0	1	1
Sivasspor	0	1	1
Alanyaspor (a)	2	1	3
Galatasaray	0	3	3

Semifinals
Trabzonspor	2	3	5
Fenerbahçe	1	1	2
Antalyaspor	0	0	0
Alanyaspor	1	4	5

Finals
Trabzonspor	2
Alanyaspor	0

== Fifth round ==
- Fifth round schedule was announced on 20 November 2019.

=== Teams ===
Seeded
Rank	Team	2019–20	2018–19	Pos.
1	Galatasaray	Süper Lig	Süper Lig	1
2	İstanbul Başakşehir	Süper Lig	Süper Lig	2
3	Beşiktaş	Süper Lig	Süper Lig	3
4	Trabzonspor	Süper Lig	Süper Lig	4
5	Yeni Malatyaspor	Süper Lig	Süper Lig	5
6	Fenerbahçe	Süper Lig	Süper Lig	6
7	Antalyaspor	Süper Lig	Süper Lig	7
8	Alanyaspor	Süper Lig	Süper Lig	9
9	Kayserispor	Süper Lig	Süper Lig	10
10	Çaykur Rizespor	Süper Lig	Süper Lig	11
11	Sivasspor	Süper Lig	Süper Lig	12
12	Kasımpaşa	Süper Lig	Süper Lig	14
13	Göztepe	Süper Lig	Süper Lig	15
14	Denizlispor	Süper Lig	First League	1
15	Gaziantep F.K.	Süper Lig	First League	5
16	Bursaspor	First League	Süper Lig	16

Unseeded
Rank	Team	2019–20	2018–19	Pos.
17	BB Erzurumspor	First League	Süper Lig	17
18	Altınordu	First League	First League	7
19	Altay	First League	First League	10
20	İstanbulspor	First League	First League	11
21	Adanaspor	First League	First League	12
22	Keçiörengücü	First League	Second League	1
23	Fatih Karagümrük	First League	Second League	2
24	Samsunspor	Second League	Second League	3 (73)
25	Manisa FK	Second League	Second League	3 (62)
26	Tuzlaspor	Second League	Second League	4
27	Kırklarelispor	Second League	Second League	8
28	Eyüpspor	Second League	Second League	9
29	Hekimoğlu Trabzon	Second League	Third League	1
30	Vanspor	Second League	Third League	3
31	Esenler Erokspor	Third League	Third League	2
32	24 Erzincanspor	Third League	Third League	7

=== Summary table ===
Team 1	Agg.	Team 2	1st leg	2nd leg
Kasımpaşa	4–3	Vanspor	2–1	2–2 (a.e.t.)
Eyüpspor	2–5	Antalyaspor	0–3	2–2
Çaykur Rizespor	4–3	Samsunspor	3–2	1–1
Alanyaspor	12–2	Adanaspor	5–1	7–1
Galatasaray	4–2	Tuzlaspor	0–2	4–0
Beşiktaş	3–2	24 Erzincanspor	3–0	2–0
Yeni Malatyaspor	5–3	Keçiörengücü	3–1	2–2
Kırklarelispor	4–4 (a)	Gaziantep F.K.	2–1	2–3
Esenler Erokspor	1–2	Sivasspor	0–2	1–0
Fatih Karagümrük	2–4	Göztepe	1–2	1–2
Fenerbahçe	6–0	İstanbulspor	4–0	2–0
Kayserispor	6–5	Manisa FK	3–2	3–3
Altınordu	5–7	Denizlispor	3–5	2–2
Hekimoğlu Trabzon	0–3	İstanbul Başakşehir	0–1	0–2
Bursaspor	4–5	BB Erzurumspor	4–2	2–1
Altay	1–6	Trabzonspor	1–2	1–4

=== First leg ===
3 December 2019	Fatih Karagümrük	1 – 2	Göztepe	Istanbul
13:00	Nukan 42'; Öztekin 55'		Sosseh 63'	Stadium: Vefa

3 December 2019	Yeni Malatyaspor	3 – 1	Keçiörengücü	Malatya
14:30	Tozlu 30' (pen.); Guilherme 35'; Can 54' (o.g.)		Bilal 52'	Stadium: Yeni Malatya

3 December 2019	Alanyaspor	5 – 1	Adanaspor	Antalya
16:30	Tzavellas 5'; Bammou 48'; Bammou 58'; Bingöl 66' (o.g.); Campos 87'		Roni 56'	Stadium: Bahçeşehir Okulları

3 December 2019	Esenler Erokspor	0 – 2	Sivasspor	Istanbul
18:30			Traore 3'; Fernando 73'	Stadium: Esenler

3 December 2019	Fenerbahçe	4 – 0	İstanbulspor	Istanbul
20:45	Türüç 15'; Kadıoğlu 16'; Muriqi 71'; Zajc 88'			Stadium: Ülker

4 December 2019	Hekimoğlu Trabzon	0 – 1	İstanbul Başakşehir	Trabzon
13:00			Ba 5'	Stadium: Vakfıkebir İlçe

4 December 2019	Eyüpspor	0 – 3	Antalyaspor	Istanbul
13:45			Blanco 33'; Fredy 40'; Alpsoy 63'	Stadium: Esenler

4 December 2019	Kasımpaşa	2 – 1	Van Spor	Istanbul
14:30	Heintz 31'; Kara 44'		Er 18'	Stadium: Recep Tayyip Erdoğan

4 December 2019	BB Erzurumspor	4 – 2	Bursaspor	Erzurum
16:30	Sunu 15'; Sunu 55'; Poté 67'; Poté 83'		Köz 17'; Seleznyov 89'	Stadium: Erzurum Kazım Karabekir

4 December 2019	Altay	1 – 2	Trabzonspor	Izmir
18:30	Leandrinho 55' (pen.)		Sturridge 45'; Sörloth 66'	Stadium: İzmir Atatürk

4 December 2019	Galatasaray	0 – 2	Tuzlaspor	Istanbul
20:45			Baş 53'; Sönmez 90'	Stadium: Türk Telekom

5 December 2019	Kırklarelispor	2 – 1	Gaziantep FK	Kirklareli
13:00	Sürmeli 45'; Koca 79'		Özer 87' (pen.)	Stadium: Kırklareli Atatürk

5 December 2019	Kayserispor	3 – 2	Manisa FK	Kayseri
14:30	Kula 22'; Alkurt 49'; Kravets 51'		Güçlü 66' (pen.); Fındık 75'	Stadium: Büyükşehir Belediyesi Kadir Has

5 December 2019	Altınordu	3 – 5	Denizlispor	Izmir
16:30	Gök 45'; Aslıyüksek 52'; Aktay 90+1'		Estupinan 33'; Akyüz 50'; Çalık 59'; Murawski 64' (pen.); Estupinan 68'	Stadium: Gazi Mustafa Kemal Atatürk

5 December 2019	Çaykur Rizespor	3 – 2	Samsunspor	Rize
18:30	Moroziuk 18'; Scepovic 28'; Scepovic 31'		Sulu 42'; Kubilay Yavuz 86' (pen.)	Stadium: Çaykur Didi

5 December 2019	Beşiktaş	3 – 0	24 Erzincanspor	Istanbul
20:45	Boyd 25'; Kaya 45'; Nayir 84'			Stadium: Vodafone Park

=== Second leg ===
17 December 2019	Van Spor	2 – 2 (a.e.t.)	Kasımpaşa	Van
13:00	Er 45' (pen.); Cansu 60'		Hajradinovic 34'; Depe 97'	Stadium: Van Atatürk

17 December 2019	Antalyaspor	2 – 2	Eyüpspor	Antalya
14:30	Dala 23'; Başar 77'		Mertöz 8'; Türkeri 64'	Stadium: Antalya

17 December 2019	Samsunspor	1 – 1	Çaykur Rizespor	Samsun
16:30	Köse 87'		Scepovic 55'	Stadium: Samsun Yeni 19 Mayıs

17 December 2019	Adanaspor	1 – 7	Alanyaspor	Adana
18:30	Akyol 59'		Güneş 14'; Büyüksakarya 21' (o.g.); Bulut 29'; Tzavellas 44'; Campos 53'; Bulut 74'; Bulut 83'	Stadium: 5 Ocak Fatih Terim

17 December 2019	Tuzlaspor	0 – 4	Galatasaray	Istanbul
20:45			Nagatomo 10'; Falcao 16'; Feghouli 45+1'; Belhanda 90+2'	Stadium: Esenyurt Necmi Kadıoğlu

18 December 2019	24 Erzincanspor	2 – 0	Beşiktaş	Erzincan
13:00	Çakır 45+1'; Şahin 89'			Stadium: Müstakil Atletizm Pisti Futbol Sahası

18 December 2019	Keçiörengücü	2 – 2	Yeni Malatyaspor	Ankara
13:45	Kuzey 50'; Kuzey 63'		Fofana 78'; Guilherme 87'	Stadium: Aktepe

18 December 2019	Gaziantep FK	3 – 2	Kırklarelispor	Gaziantep
14:30	Özer 12'; Demir 84'; Demir 90'		Pekesen 37'; Karaahmet 72'	Stadium: Kalyon

18 December 2019	Sivasspor	0 – 1	Esenler Erokspor	Sivas
16:30			Karaman 77'	Stadium: Yeni 4 Eylül

18 December 2019	Göztepe	2 – 1	Fatih Karagümrük	Izmir
18:30	Derdiyok 39'; Mossoro 77'		Yıldırım 42' (pen.)	Stadium: Bornova Aziz Kocaoğlu

18 December 2019	İstanbulspor	0 – 2	Fenerbahçe	Istanbul
20:45			Zanka 54'; Arslan 83'	Stadium: Esenyurt Necmi Kadıoğlu

19 December 2019	Manisa FK	3 – 3	Kayserispor	Manisa
13:00	Fındık 30'; Bulucu 83'; Kara 90+1'		Aktaş 63' (pen.); Uzun 73'; Uzun 87'	Stadium: Mümin Özkasap Spor Tesisleri

19 December 2019	Denizlispor	2 – 2	Altınordu	Denizli
14:30	Estupinan 6'; Estupinan 30'		Rüzgar 52'; Rüzgar 79'	Stadium: Denizli Atatürk

19 December 2019	İstanbul Başakşehir	2 – 0	Hekimoğlu Trabzon	Istanbul
16:30	Ba 54'; Arslantaş 88' (pen.)			Stadium: Başakşehir Fatih Terim

19 December 2019	Bursaspor	2 – 1	BB Erzurumspor	Bursa
18:30	Akman 64'; Latovlevici 87'		Hamroun 44'	Stadium: Bursa Büyükşehir Belediye

19 December 2019	Trabzonspor	4 – 1	Altay	Trabzon
20:45	Sturridge 51'; Ekuban 56'; Sturridge 64'; Fernandes 71'		Paixao 83'	Stadium: Şenol Güneş Spor Kompleksi

== Round of 16 ==
=== Teams ===
Seeded
1	Galatasaray
2	İstanbul Başakşehir
3	Beşiktaş
4	Trabzonspor
5	Yeni Malatyaspor
6	Fenerbahçe
7	Antalyaspor
8	Alanyaspor

Unseeded
9	Kayserispor
10	Çaykur Rizespor
11	Sivasspor
12	Kasımpaşa
13	Göztepe
14	Denizlispor
15	BB Erzurumspor
16	Kırklarelispor

=== Summary table ===
Team 1	Agg.	Team 2	1st leg	2nd leg
İstanbul Başakşehir	1–1 (a)	Kırklarelispor	1–1	0–0
Kayserispor	0–2	Fenerbahçe	0–0	0–2
Alanyaspor	5–4	Kasımpaşa	3–1	2–3
Antalyaspor	6–5	Göztepe	4–3	2–2
BB Erzurumspor	6–4	Beşiktaş	3–2	3–2
Sivasspor	5–2	Yeni Malatyaspor	4–0	1–2
Trabzonspor	2–2 (4–2 p)	Denizlispor	2–0	0–2 (a.e.t.)
Çaykur Rizespor	2–3	Galatasaray	1–1	1–2

== Quarter-finals ==
=== Teams ===
Seeded
1	Galatasaray
2	Trabzonspor
3	Fenerbahçe
4	Antalyaspor

Unseeded
5	Alanyaspor
6	Sivasspor
7	BB Erzurumspor
8	Kırklarelispor

=== Summary table ===
Team 1	Agg.	Team 2	1st leg	2nd leg
Trabzonspor	9–1	BB Erzurumspor	5–0	4–1
Kırklarelispor	0–4	Fenerbahçe	0–3	0–1
Alanyaspor	3–3 (a)	Galatasaray	2–0	1–3
Antalyaspor	1–1 (a)	Sivasspor	0–0	1–1

=== First leg ===
4 February 2020	Trabzonspor	5 – 0	BB Erzurumspor	Trabzon
20:30	Sørloth 16', 66'; Acer 26' (o.g.); Nwakaeme 43'; Açıl 60' (o.g.)	Report		Stadium: Medical Park Stadium; Referee: Abdulkadir Bitigen

5 February 2020	Kırklarelispor	0 – 3	Fenerbahçe	Kırklareli
14:30		Report	Erdinç 43', 52'; Sürgülü 57' (o.g.)	Stadium: Kırklareli Atatürk Stadium; Referee: Atilla Karaoglan

5 February 2020	Alanyaspor	2 – 0	Galatasaray	Antalya
20:30	Bakasetas 20'; Júnior Fernándes 55'	Report		Stadium: Bahçeşehir Okulları Stadium; Referee: Ali Şansalan

6 February 2020	Antalyaspor	0 – 0	Sivasspor	Antalya
20:30		Report		Stadium: Antalya Stadium; Referee: Yaşar Kemal Uğurlu

=== Second leg ===
11 February 2020	Fenerbahçe	1 – 0	Kırklarelispor	Istanbul
20:30	Erdinç 50'	Report		Stadium: Şükrü Saracoğlu Stadium; Referee: Suat Arslanboğa

12 February 2020	Galatasaray	3 – 1	Alanyaspor	Istanbul
20:30	Akbaba 9'; Büyük 55' (pen.), 85'	Report	Bammou 31'	Stadium: Türk Telekom Stadium; Referee: Yaşar Kemal Uğurlu

13 February 2020	BB Erzurumspor	1 – 4	Trabzonspor	Erzurum
17:30	Ayaroğlu 17'	Report	Guilherme 9', 46'; Parmak 68'; Kınalı 83'	Stadium: Kazım Karabekir Stadium; Referee: Erkan Özdamar

13 February 2020	Sivasspor	1 – 1	Antalyaspor	Sivas
20:30	Sinik 49'	Report	Öztekin 32'	Stadium: New Sivas 4 Eylül Stadium; Referee: Fırat Aydınus

== Semi-finals ==
Team 1	Agg.	Team 2	1st leg	2nd leg
Trabzonspor	5–2	Fenerbahçe	2–1	3–1
Alanyaspor	5–0	Antalyaspor	1–0	4–0

=== First leg ===
3 March 2020	Trabzonspor	2 – 1	Fenerbahçe	Trabzon
20:30	Sørloth 46'; Novák 66'	Report	Muriqi 82'	Stadium: Medical Park Stadium; Referee: Yaşar Kemal Uğurlu

4 March 2020	Antalyaspor	0 – 1	Alanyaspor	Antalya
20:30		Report	Junior Fernándes 90'	Stadium: Antalya Stadium; Referee: Alper Ulusoy

=== Second leg ===
16 June 2020	Fenerbahçe	1 – 3	Trabzonspor	Istanbul
20:45	Türüç 42'	Report	Sørloth 6', 83'; Novák 90+2'	Stadium: Şükrü Saracoğlu Stadium; Referee: Cüneyt Çakır

18 June 2020	Alanyaspor	4 – 0	Antalyaspor	Alanya, Antalya
20:45	Cissé 15', 46', 49'; Gülselam 25'	Report		Stadium: Bahçeşehir Okulları Stadium; Referee: Arda Kardeşler

== Final ==
29 July 2020
21:30 (19:30 UTC+1)

Trabzonspor	2 – 0	Alanyaspor
Ömür 25'; Sørloth 90+10'	Report

Atatürk Olympic Stadium, Istanbul
Referee: Ali Palabıyık

== Top Goalscorers ==
Note: Players and teams in bold are still active in the competition.

Rank	Player	Club	Goals
1	(Norway) Alexander Sørloth	Trabzonspor	7
1	(Colombia) Óscar Estupiñán	Denizlispor	7
1	(Turkey) Oltan Karakullukçu	BB Erzurumspor	7
4	(Turkey) Kenan Özer	Gaziantep F.K.	4
4	(Turkey) Abdulkadir Kuzey	Keçiörengücü	4
4	(Turkey) Ahmethan Köse	Samsunspor	4
4	(Turkey) Harun Özcan	Eyüpspor	4
4	(Serbia) Marko Šćepović	Çaykur Rizespor	4
4	(Turkey) Harun Alpsoy	Antalyaspor	4
4	(Turkey) Mert Hakan Yandaş	Sivasspor	4
4	(Greece) Anastasios Bakasetas	Alanyaspor	4
4	(Brazil) Guilherme	Yeni Malatyaspor; Trabzonspor	4
4	(Morocco) Yacine Bammou	Alanyaspor	4
4	(Senegal) Papiss Cissé	Alanyaspor	4
4	(Turkey) Mevlüt Erdinç	Fenerbahçe	4
16	(Switzerland) Eren Derdiyok	Göztepe	3
16	(France) Gilles Sunu	BB Erzurumspor	3
16	(Turkey) Hakkı Tosun	1074 Çankırıspor	3
16	(Ukraine) Yevhen Seleznyov	Bursaspor	3
16	(Turkey) Zahit Fındık	Manisa FK	3
16	(Turkey) Özgür Çek	Kasımpaşa	3
16	(Turkey) Berkay Günay	Görelespor	3
16	(Turkey) Onur Bulut	Alanyaspor	3
16	(England) Daniel Sturridge	Trabzonspor	3
16	(Sweden) Stefan Silva	Fatih Karagümrük	3
16	(Turkey) Ahmet Dereli	Adanaspor	3
16	(Turkey) Serhan Yılmaz	Elazığ Belediyespor	3
16	(Turkey) Yasin Öztekin	Göztepe; Sivasspor	3
16	(Turkey) Deniz Türüç	Fenerbahçe	3
16	(Turkey) Recep Niyaz	Çaykur Rizespor	3
16	(Chile) Júnior Fernándes	Alanyaspor	3
16	(Turkey) Aytaç Kara	Kasımpaşa	3
16	(Angola) Djalma	Alanyaspor	3
16	(Turkey) Adem Büyük	Galatasaray	3

As of 12 August 2020. Source:
