= 2018–19 VfL Bochum season =

VfL Bochum
2018–19 season
- Chairman: Hans-Peter Villis
- Manager: Robin Dutt
- Stadium: Vonovia-Ruhrstadion
- 2. Bundesliga: 11th
- DFB-Pokal: First Round
- Top goalscorer: League: Hinterseer (18); All: Hinterseer (18)
- Highest home attendance: 26,600 (vs 1. FC Köln, 4 August 2018; vs. Hamburger SV, 30 March 2019)
- Lowest home attendance: 12,022 (vs SV Darmstadt 98, 12 November 2018)
- Average home league attendance: 17,662
Home colours	Away colours

The 2018–19 VfL Bochum season is the 81st season in club history.

== Review and events ==
Anthony Losilla set a new record for the number of 2. Bundesliga appearances for Bochum. After Losilla tied Marcel Maltritz's old record of 156 appearances on 4 May 2019 against Magdeburg, he broke it on 12 May 2019 with his appearance against St. Pauli.

== Matches ==
=== Legend ===
Win Draw Loss

=== Friendly matches ===
27 June 2018 Friendly	DJK Adler Riemke	0–17	VfL Bochum	Bochum
19:00			Fabian 10'; Wurtz 12'; Weilandt 18', 37'; Janelt 23'; Ekincier 25', 36'; Sağlam 34', 41'; Sam 47'; Lorenz 55'; Hinterseer 65', 82'; Maier 68', 75'; 77' (o.g.); Pantović 89'	Stadium: Bezirkssportanlage Feenstraße

30 June 2018 Friendly	SG Linden-Dahlhausen	0–24	VfL Bochum	Bochum-Linden
18:00			Weilandt 7', 24', 26', 34', 44'; Hinterseer 22' (pen.), 38'; Soares 42'; Wurtz 46', 47', 51', 57', 69', 75', 79', 82'; Sam 58', 87', 89'; Losilla 65'; Pantović 73', 86'; Sağlam 77'; Lorenz 84'	Stadium: Sportanlage am Lewacker; Attendance: 1,500

4 July 2018 Friendly	VfL Bochum	2–2	FC Brünninghausen	Bochum
18:00	Wurtz 62'; Leitsch 90'		Et 1'; Sacher 31'	Stadium: Sportplatz Zur Burkuhle; Attendance: 1,400

9 July 2018 Friendly	FC Zürich	0–3	VfL Bochum	Durach
18:00			Maier 16'; Weilandt 19'; Soares 48'	Stadium: ABT Arena; Referee: Tobias Schultes

12 July 2018 Friendly	1. FC Kaiserslautern	2–2	VfL Bochum	Feldkirch, Austria
17:00	Gyamerah 43' (o.g.); Spalvis 75' (pen.)		Wurtz 68'; Hinterseer 70'	Stadium: Waldstadion; Referee: Robert Schörgenhofer (Austria)

18 July 2018 Friendly	Stoke City F.C.	0–2	VfL Bochum	Rheine
18:00			Janelt 24', 45'	Stadium: OBI Arena; Attendance: 687

22 July 2018 H-Hotels Cup Semi-final	VfL Bochum	0–0 (5–4 p)	Wolverhampton Wanderers F.C.	Bochum
15:00				Stadium: Vonovia-Ruhrstadion; Attendance: 7,120
	Penalties
	Hoogland (penalty scored); Tesche (penalty missed); Celozzi (penalty scored); Hinterseer (penalty missed); Soares (penalty scored); Sağlam (penalty scored); Weilandt (penalty scored)		(penalty scored) Neves; (penalty missed) Jiménez; (penalty missed) Coady; (penalty scored) Jota; (penalty scored) Gonçalves; (penalty scored) Enobakhare; (penalty missed) Giles
Note: One single 45-minute fixture with no half-time. As the match ended in a draw, a penalty shoot-out took place to determine a winner.

22 July 2018 H-Hotels Cup Final	VfL Bochum	0–0 (5–6 p)	Borussia Mönchengladbach	Bochum
17:00				Stadium: Vonovia-Ruhrstadion; Attendance: 7,120
	Penalties
	Losilla (penalty scored); Ganvoula (penalty missed); Tesche (penalty missed); Kruse (penalty scored); Wurtz (penalty scored); Gyamerah (penalty scored); Pantović (penalty scored); Fabian (penalty missed)		(penalty scored) Traoré; (penalty scored) Herzog; (penalty scored) Bennetts; (penalty missed) Egbo; (penalty missed) Pléa; (penalty scored) Pazurek; (penalty scored) Poulsen; (penalty scored) Hanraths
Note: One single 45-minute fixture with no half-time. As the match ended in a draw, a penalty shoot-out took place to determine a winner.

25 July 2018 Friendly	AS Monaco FC	2–2	VfL Bochum	Verl
18:00	Lopes (2.)		Ganvoula 40'; Hinterseer 69'	Stadium: Stadion an der Poststraße; Attendance: 536; Referee: Martin Thomsen (Kleve)

28 July 2018 Friendly	Millwall F.C.	1–0	VfL Bochum	Bermondsey, England
13:00	Wallace 43'			Stadium: The Den; Attendance: 2,614; Referee: Charles Breakspear

6 September 2018 Friendly	Borussia Mönchengladbach	2–1	VfL Bochum	Willingen
18:30	Strobl 5'; Raffael 33'		Hinterseer 50'	Stadium: Uplandstadion; Attendance: 2,400; Referee: Thorben Siewer (Drolshagen)

16 January 2019 Friendly	VfL Bochum	1–1	PFC CSKA Sofia	Marbella, Spain
15:00	Maier 63'		Malinov 75'	Stadium: La Dama de Noche

19 January 2019 Friendly	VfL Bochum	0–3	FC Dynamo Kyiv	Marbella, Spain
16:00			Tsygankov 29'; Rusyn 69', 78'	Stadium: Estadio Municipal

23 January 2019 Friendly	1. FC Köln	2–1	VfL Bochum	Cologne
18:30	Córdoba 5', 14'		Ganvoula 67'	Stadium: Franz-Kremer-Stadion; Referee: Sascha Stegemann (Niederkassel)

=== 2. Bundesliga ===
==== League table ====
Pos	Team	Pld	W	D	L	GF	GA	GD	Pts
9	FC St. Pauli	34	14	7	13	46	53	−7	49
10	Darmstadt 98	34	13	7	14	45	53	−8	46
11	VfL Bochum	34	11	11	12	49	50	−1	44
12	Dynamo Dresden	34	11	9	14	41	48	−7	42
13	Greuther Fürth	34	10	12	12	37	56	−19	42

Source: DFB
Rules for classification: 1) Points; 2) Goal difference; 3) Goals scored; 4) Head-to-head points; 5) Head-to-head goal difference; 6) Head-to-head goals scored; 7) Head-to-head away goals scored; 8) Away goals scored; 9) Play-off.

==== Results summary ====
Overall								Home						Away					
Pld	W	D	L	GF	GA	GD	Pts	W	D	L	GF	GA	GD	W	D	L	GF	GA	GD
34	11	11	12	49	50	−1	44	9	3	5	29	22	+7	2	8	7	20	28	−8

==== Results by round ====
Round	1	2	3	4	5	6	7	8	9	10	11	12	13	14	15	16	17	18	19	20	21	22	23	24	25	26	27	28	29	30	31	32	33	34
Ground	H	A	H	A	H	A	H	A	H	A	H	A	H	H	A	H	A	A	H	A	H	A	H	A	H	A	H	A	H	A	A	H	A	H
Result	L	W	W	D	W	D	L	L	W	D	D	D	W	W	D	L	L	W	W	L	L	L	L	D	W	L	D	L	W	D	L	W	D	D
Position	17	9	5	7	3	3	8	11	7	7	7	8	5	5	5	7	8	8	7	8	8	8	9	9	9	9	9	11	10	9	11	11	10	11

A = Away; H = Home; W = Win; D = Draw; L = Loss

==== Matches ====
4 August 2018 1	VfL Bochum	0–2	1. FC Köln	Bochum
13:00			Leitsch 44' (o.g.); Czichos 59'	Stadium: Vonovia-Ruhrstadion; Attendance: 26,600; Referee: Felix Zwayer (Berlin)

11 August 2018 2	MSV Duisburg	0–2	VfL Bochum	Duisburg
13:00			Sam 55'; Ganvoula 64'	Stadium: Schauinsland-Reisen-Arena; Attendance: 20,541; Referee: Christian Dingert (Gries)

24 August 2018 3	VfL Bochum	1–0	SV Sandhausen	Bochum
18.30	Tesche 54'			Stadium: Vonovia-Ruhrstadion; Attendance: 13,821; Referee: Patrick Alt (Heusweiler)

31 August 2018 4	SC Paderborn 07	2–2	VfL Bochum	Paderborn
18.30	Klement 52' (pen.); Michel 54'		Weilandt 45+1'; Ganvoula 79'	Stadium: Benteler-Arena; Attendance: 12,518; Referee: Florian Badstübner (Windsbach)

16 September 2018 5	VfL Bochum	6–0	FC Ingolstadt 04	Bochum
13.30	Hinterseer 4' (pen.), 62', 66' (pen.); Kruse 14'; Weilandt 19'; Losilla 79'			Stadium: Vonovia-Ruhrstadion; Attendance: 14,341; Referee: Robert Kempter (Stockach)

22 September 2018 6	Holstein Kiel	2–2	VfL Bochum	Kiel
13.00	Soares 57' (o.g.); Serra 90'		Hinterseer 38'; Weilandt 65'	Stadium: Holstein-Stadion; Attendance: 8,880; Referee: Tobias Reichel (Stuttgart)

25 September 2018 7	VfL Bochum	0–1	Dynamo Dresden	Bochum
18.30			Koné 39' (pen.)	Stadium: Vonovia-Ruhrstadion; Attendance: 15,511; Referee: Martin Petersen (Stuttgart)

29 September 2018 8	1. FC Heidenheim	3–2	VfL Bochum	Heidenheim an der Brenz
13.00	Dovedan 11'; Glatzel 77'; Schnatterer 84'		Hinterseer 21'; Hoogland 31'	Stadium: Voith-Arena; Attendance: 10,600; Referee: René Rohde (Rostock)

5 October 2018 9	VfL Bochum	1–0	Arminia Bielefeld	Bochum
18:30	Weilandt 8'			Stadium: Vonovia-Ruhrstadion; Attendance: 19,231; Referee: Lasse Koslowski (Berlin)

21 October 2018 10	Hamburger SV	0–0	VfL Bochum	Hamburg
13:30				Stadium: Volksparkstadion; Attendance: 51,953; Referee: Christof Günsch (Marburg)

29 October 2018 11	VfL Bochum	3–3	SSV Jahn Regensburg	Bochum
20:30	Tesche 45+1'; Hinterseer 54', 65'		Adamyan 11'; Lais 77' (pen.); Al Ghaddioui 90+3'	Stadium: Vonovia-Ruhrstadion; Attendance: 12,621; Referee: Martin Petersen (Stuttgart)

2 November 2018 12	SpVgg Greuther Fürth	2–2	VfL Bochum	Fürth
18:30	Gugganig 56'; Keita-Ruel 90+1'		Tesche 37'; Hinterseer 45+1'	Stadium: Sportpark Ronhof; Attendance: 8,750; Referee: Patrick Alt (Heusweiler)

12 November 2018 13	VfL Bochum	1–0	SV Darmstadt 98	Bochum
20:30	Weilandt 62'			Stadium: Vonovia-Ruhrstadion; Attendance: 12,022; Referee: Martin Thomsen (Kleve)

24 November 2018 14	VfL Bochum	2–1	FC Erzgebirge Aue	Bochum
13:00	Weilandt 73', 90+3'		Testroet 2'	Stadium: Vonovia-Ruhrstadion; Attendance: 17,012; Referee: Robert Kampka (Mainz)

2 December 2018 15	1. FC Magdeburg	0–0	VfL Bochum	Magdeburg
13:30				Stadium: MDCC-Arena; Attendance: 22,252; Referee: Robert Kempter (Stockach)

10 December 2018 16	VfL Bochum	1–3	FC St. Pauli	Bochum
20:30	Hinterseer 35'		Allagui 15'; Veerman 42'; Møller Dæhli 86'	Stadium: Vonovia-Ruhrstadion; Attendance: 22,916; Referee: Benedikt Kempkes (Thür)

15 December 2018 17	1. FC Union Berlin	2–0	VfL Bochum	Berlin
13:00	Polter 60' (pen.); Žulj 87'			Stadium: Stadion An der Alten Försterei; Attendance: 20,728; Referee: Matthias Jöllenbeck (Freiburg)

21 December 2018 18	1. FC Köln	2–3	VfL Bochum	Cologne
18:30	Terodde 24'; Risse 76'		Hinterseer 1', 58'; Sam 69'	Stadium: Müngersdorfer Stadion; Attendance: 50,000; Referee: Benjamin Cortus (Röthenbach)

29 January 2019 19	VfL Bochum	2–1	MSV Duisburg	Bochum
18:30	Zoller 13'; Fabian 21'		Nielsen 79'	Stadium: Vonovia-Ruhrstadion; Attendance: 17,810; Referee: Daniel Schlager (Hügelsheim)

3 February 2019 20	SV Sandhausen	3–0	VfL Bochum	Sandhausen
13:30	Knipping 54'; Wooten 75'; Schleusener 90'			Stadium: Hardtwaldstadion; Attendance: 5,524; Referee: Robert Schröder (Hannover)

9 February 2019 21	VfL Bochum	1–2	SC Paderborn 07	Bochum
13:00	Hinterseer 79'		Zolinski 1'; Michel 45+1'	Stadium: Vonovia-Ruhrstadion; Attendance: 16,033; Referee: Robert Kempter (Stockach)

16 February 2019 22	FC Ingolstadt 04	2–1	VfL Bochum	Ingolstadt
13:00	Kittel 31', 38'		Janelt 72'	Stadium: Audi Sportpark; Attendance: 7,464; Referee: Sven Jablonski (Bremen)

23 February 2019 23	VfL Bochum	1–3	Holstein Kiel	Bochum
13:00	Zoller 77'		Mühling 30'; Serra 32' (pen.); Okugawa 41'	Stadium: Vonovia-Ruhrstadion; Attendance: 13,398; Referee: Christof Günsch (Marburg)

3 March 2019 24	Dynamo Dresden	2–2	VfL Bochum	Dresden
13:30	Atik 33'; Nikolaou 59'		Hinterseer 10'; Pantović 14'	Stadium: Stadion Dresden; Attendance: 28,153; Referee: Michael Bacher (Amerang-Kirchensur)

8 March 2019 25	VfL Bochum	1–0	1. FC Heidenheim	Bochum
18:30	Lee 78'			Stadium: Vonovia-Ruhrstadion; Attendance: 13,157; Referee: René Rohde (Rostock)

17 March 2019 26	Arminia Bielefeld	3–1	VfL Bochum	Bielefeld
13:30	Voglsammer 68'; Klos 78' (pen.); Clauss 79'		Fabian 63'	Stadium: Alm; Attendance: 18,192; Referee: Pascal Müller (Löchgau)

30 March 2019 27	VfL Bochum	0–0	Hamburger SV	Bochum
13:00				Stadium: Vonovia-Ruhrstadion; Attendance: 26,600; Referee: Lasse Koslowski (Berlin)

5 April 2019 28	SSV Jahn Regensburg	2–1	VfL Bochum	Regensburg
18:30	George 54'; Grüttner 62'		Hinterseer 52' (pen.)	Stadium: Continental Arena; Attendance: 12,363; Referee: Christof Günsch (Marburg)

14 April 2019 29	VfL Bochum	3–2	SpVgg Greuther Fürth	Bochum
13:30	Hinterseer 13', 53', 90+1'		Ernst 6'; Seguin 36'	Stadium: Vonovia-Ruhrstadion; Attendance: 17,334; Referee: Johann Pfeifer (Hameln)

21 April 2019 30	SV Darmstadt 98	0–0	VfL Bochum	Darmstadt
13:30				Stadium: Stadion am Böllenfalltor; Attendance: 10,590; Referee: Sven Waschitzki (Essen)

28 April 2019 31	FC Erzgebirge Aue	3–2	VfL Bochum	Aue
13:30	Zulechner 6'; Testroet 38'; Nazarov 90+4' (pen.)		Hinterseer 44'; Ganvoula 76'	Stadium: Erzgebirgsstadion; Attendance: 10,150; Referee: Benedikt Kempkes (Thür)

4 May 2019 32	VfL Bochum	4–2	1. FC Magdeburg	Bochum
13:00	Ganvoula 42'; Baumgartner 51'; Weilandt 61', 84'		Bülter 65'; Beck 87'	Stadium: Vonovia-Ruhrstadion; Attendance: 17,339; Referee: Timo Gerach (Landau)

12 May 2019 33	FC St. Pauli	0–0	VfL Bochum	Hamburg
15:30				Stadium: Millerntor-Stadion; Attendance: 29,546; Referee: Daniel Siebert (Berlin)

19 May 2019 34	VfL Bochum	2–2	1. FC Union Berlin	Bochum
15:30	Losilla 24'; Ganvoula 49' (pen.)		Prömel 83'; Mees 86'	Stadium: Vonovia-Ruhrstadion; Attendance: 24,500; Referee: Harm Osmers (Hannover)

=== DFB-Pokal ===
19 August 2018 R1	SC Weiche Flensburg 08	1–0	VfL Bochum	Flensburg
15:30	Schulz 34'			Stadium: Manfred-Werner-Stadion; Attendance: 3,500; Referee: René Rohde (Rostock)

== Squad ==
=== Squad and statistics ===
==== Squad, appearances and goals scored ====
As of 19 May 2019

No.	Pos	Nat	Player	Total		2. Bundesliga		DFB-Pokal	
No.	Pos	Nat	Player	Apps	Goals	Apps	Goals	Apps	Goals
1	GK	(Germany) GER	Manuel Riemann	34	0	34	0	0	0
2	MF	(Germany) GER	Tim Hoogland	32	1	31	1	1	0
3	DF	(Brazil) BRA	Danilo Soares	24	0	23	0	1	0
4	DF	(Germany) GER	Simon Lorenz (until 9 July 2018)	0	0	0	0	0	0
7	MF	(Germany) GER	Sebastian Maier	10	0	10	0	0	0
8	MF	(France) FRA	Anthony Losilla	33	2	32	2	1	0
9	FW	(Germany) GER	Johannes Wurtz (until 23 August 2018)	2	0	1	0	1	0
9	FW	(Germany) GER	Simon Zoller (since 1 January 2019)	8	2	8	2	0	0
10	MF	(Germany) GER	Thomas Eisfeld	10	0	10	0	0	0
11	MF	(South Korea) KOR	Chung-yong Lee (since 6 September 2018)	23	1	23	1	0	0
13	FW	(Germany) GER	Sidney Sam	19	2	19	2	0	0
14	MF	(Germany) GER	Tom Weilandt	28	9	27	9	1	0
16	FW	(Austria) AUT	Lukas Hinterseer	32	18	31	18	1	0
17	FW	(Australia) AUS	Robbie Kruse	14	1	14	1	0	0
18	DF	(Germany) GER	Jan Gyamerah	25	0	25	0	0	0
19	DF	(Germany) GER	Patrick Fabian	18	2	18	2	0	0
20	MF	(Germany) GER	Vitaly Janelt	10	1	9	1	1	0
21	DF	(Germany) GER	Stefano Celozzi (captain)	23	0	22	0	1	0
22	DF	(Austria) AUT	Dominik Baumgartner (since 11 January 2019)	11	1	11	1	0	0
23	MF	(Germany) GER	Robert Tesche	31	3	31	3	0	0
24	DF	(Germany) GER	Timo Perthel (until 3 January 2019)	10	0	9	0	1	0
25	MF	(Germany) GER	Jannik Bandowski	3	0	3	0	0	0
26	MF	(Germany) GER	Görkem Sağlam	10	0	10	0	0	0
27	MF	(Serbia) SRB	Miloš Pantović	16	1	15	1	1	0
28	MF	(Germany) GER	Lars Holtkamp (since 2 December 2018)	0	0	0	0	0	0
29	DF	(Germany) GER	Maxim Leitsch	9	0	8	0	1	0
30	MF	(Azerbaijan) AZE	Baris Ekincier	2	0	1	0	1	0
31	DF	(Germany) GER	Tom Baack	4	0	4	0	0	0
32	GK	(Germany) GER	Felix Dornebusch	1	0	0	0	1	0
33	MF	(Germany) GER	Moritz Römling (since 6 September 2018)	3	0	3	0	0	0
34	GK	(Germany) GER	Paul Grave (since 28 July 2018)	0	0	0	0	0	0
35	FW	(Republic of the Congo) CGO	Silvère Ganvoula (since 20 July 2018)	22	5	21	5	1	0
36	MF	(Germany) GER	Jan Wellers (since 3 January 2019)	0	0	0	0	0	0
37	MF	(Germany) GER	Julian Tomas (until 2 July 2018)	0	0	0	0	0	0
37	DF	(Germany) GER	Armel Bella Kotchap (since 10 July 2018)	4	0	4	0	0	0
38	GK	(Germany) GER	Florian Kraft (until 29 January 2019)	0	0	0	0	0	0
38	DF	(Greece) GRE	Stylianos Kokovas (since 13 January 2019)	6	0	6	0	0	0
40	GK	(Germany) GER	Joshua Wehking	0	0	0	0	0	0
42	FW	(Turkey) TUR	Okan-Mete Yilmaz (since 6 September 2018)	0	0	0	0	0	0
43	FW	(Turkey) TUR	Ömer Uzun (since 23 August 2018)	0	0	0	0	0	0
46	MF	(Germany) GER	Michael Martin (since 6 September 2018)	0	0	0	0	0	0
—	DF	(Germany) GER	Phillip Aboagye (since 6 September 2018)	0	0	0	0	0	0
—	MF	(Germany) GER	Furkan Sağman (since 6 September 2018)	0	0	0	0	0	0

=== Transfers ===
As of 16 January 2019

==== Summer ====
In:

No.	Pos.	Nation	Player
7	MF	GER	Sebastian Maier (from Hannover 96)
11	MF	KOR	Chung-yong Lee (free agent)
14	MF	GER	Tom Weilandt (loan return from Holstein Kiel)
20	MF	GER	Vitaly Janelt (from RB Leipzig, previously on loan)
23	MF	GER	Robert Tesche (from (England) Birmingham City F.C., previously on loan)
27	MF	SRB	Miloš Pantović (from FC Bayern Munich II)
28	MF	GER	Lars Holtkamp (from VfL Bochum U19)
30	MF	AZE	Baris Ekincier (from VfL Bochum U19)
33	MF	GER	Moritz Römling (from VfL Bochum U19)
34	GK	GER	Paul Grave (from VfL Bochum U19)
35	FW	CGO	Silvère Ganvoula (on loan from (Belgium) R.S.C. Anderlecht)
37	DF	GER	Armel Bella Kotchap (from VfL Bochum U19)
40	GK	GER	Joshua Wehking (from RB Leipzig U19)
42	FW	TUR	Okan-Mete Yilmaz (from VfL Bochum U19)
43	FW	TUR	Ömer Uzun (from VfL Bochum U19)
46	MF	GER	Michael Martin (from VfL Bochum U19)
—	MF	GER	Furkan Sagman (from VfL Bochum U19)

Out:

No.	Pos.	Nation	Player
4	DF	GER	Simon Lorenz (on loan to TSV 1860 Munich)
6	DF	GER	Luke Hemmerich (loan return to FC Schalke 04)
7	FW	GER	Selim Gündüz (to SV Darmstadt 98)
9	FW	GER	Johannes Wurtz (to SV Darmstadt 98)
11	FW	GER	Janni Serra (loan return to Borussia Dortmund II)
14	MF	GER	Philipp Ochs (loan return to TSG 1899 Hoffenheim)
22	MF	AUT	Kevin Stöger (to Fortuna Düsseldorf)
28	MF	GER	Ulrich Bapoh (on loan to (Netherlands) FC Twente)
30	GK	POL	Martin Kompalla (released)
37	MF	GER	Julian Tomas (released)

==== Winter ====
In:

No.	Pos.	Nation	Player
9	FW	GER	Simon Zoller (from 1. FC Köln)
22	DF	AUT	Dominik Baumgartner (from (Austria) FC Wacker Innsbruck)
36	MF	GER	Jan Wellers (from VfL Bochum U19)
38	DF	GRE	Stylianos Kokovas (from VfL Bochum U19)

Out:

No.	Pos.	Nation	Player
24	DF	GER	Timo Perthel (to 1. FC Magdeburg)
38	GK	GER	Florian Kraft (to SC Fortuna Köln)
—	FW	GRE	Vangelis Pavlidis (on loan to (Netherlands) Willem II Tilburg, previously on loan at Borussia Dortmund II)
