= Citak =

Citak may refer to:

== People ==
- Hakan Çıtak (born 1999), Turkish footballer
- Yiğit Yalçın Çıtak (born 2001), Turkish Olympian sailor

== Places ==
- Çıtak, Bigadiç, a neighbourhood in Balıkesir Province, Turkey
- Çıtak, Çivril, a neighbourhood in Denizli Province, Turkey
- Çıtak, Güroymak, a village in Bitlis Province, Turkey
- Çıtak, Karakoçan, a village in Elazığ Province, Turkey

== Other uses ==
- Citak language, a Papuan language of Indonesia
- Çıtak (term), ethnonym used by 17th-century sources
