= Cenk Şahin =

Turkish footballer (born 1994)

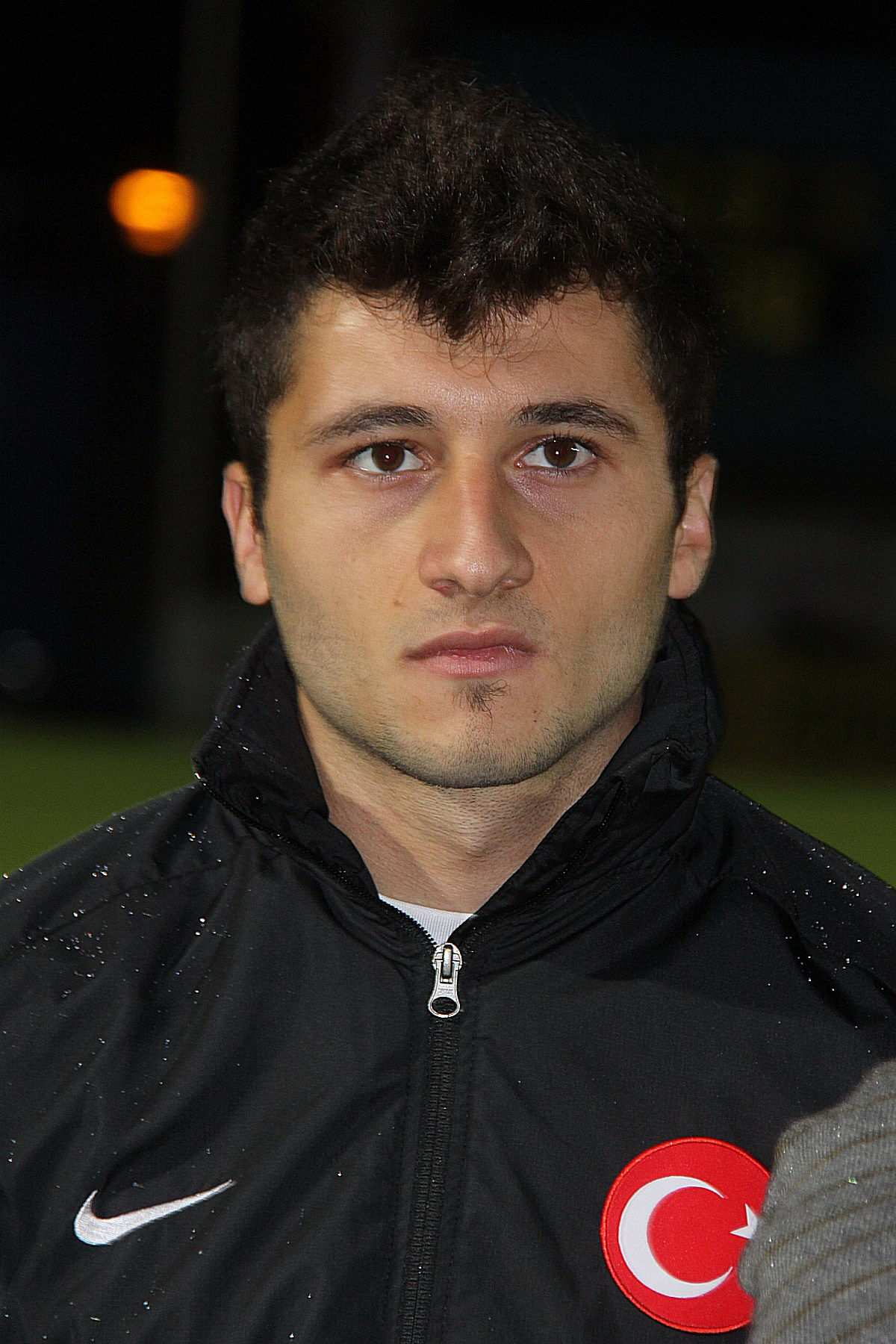
- Şahin in 2013

Personal information
- Full name: Enver Cenk Şahin
- Date of birth: 22 September 1994 (age 32)
- Place of birth: Zonguldak, Turkey
- Height: 1.79 m (5 ft 10 in)
- Positions: Winger; attacking midfielder

Team information
- Current team: Isparta 32 Spor
- Number: 10

Youth career
- 2005–2008: Zonguldak Belediyespor
- 2008–2010: Zonguldak Kömürspor
- 2010–2011: İstanbul Başakşehir

Senior career*
Years	Team	Apps	(Gls)
2011–2017	İstanbul Başakşehir	66	(5)
2016–2017	→ FC St. Pauli (loan)	27	(4)
2017–2019	FC St. Pauli	30	(2)
2018–2019	→ FC Ingolstadt 04 (loan)	9	(0)
2020	Kayserispor	11	(0)
2020–2022	Gaziantep	28	(1)
2022–2023	Bursaspor	37	(11)
2023–2024	Şanlıurfaspor	11	(0)
2024–2025	24 Erzincanspor	19	(2)
2025–2026	İstanbulspor	8	(0)
2026–	Isparta 32 Spor	4	(2)

International career
2010	Turkey U16	2	(0)
2010–2011	Turkey U17	13	(3)
2011–2012	Turkey U18	9	(3)
2011–2013	Turkey U19	18	(3)
2012–2014	Turkey U20	19	(5)
2013–2015	Turkey U21	7	(0)
- * Club domestic league appearances and goals as of 1 October 2026

Enver Cenk Şahin (born 22 September 1994) is a Turkish professional footballer who plays as a midfielder for TFF 2. Lig club Isparta 32 Spor.

== Club career ==
Şahin started his youth career at Zonguldak Kömürspor, before joining İstanbul Başakşehir in 2010. He made his debut as a substitute in a 4–2 victory against Samsunspor on 29 January 2012.

On 26 July 2016, Şahin joined FC St. Pauli for one year with an option to sign permanently. In May 2017, the club announced they had exercised the option to sign him permanently with Şahin agreeing to a contract until 2021. The transfer fee paid to İstanbul Başakşehir was reported as €2 million. On 25 January 2019, he joined Ingolstadt on loan until the end of the season. He was released by St Pauli in October 2019 after posting comments supporting Turkish soldiers in Syria.

After the release, he joined Turkish side Kayserispor on a free transfer until the end of the season.

On 6 August 2020, Şahin joined rival Gaziantep, on a 3-year deal.

On 17 February 2022, Şahin joined 1.Lig side Bursaspor.

On 13 September 2023, Şahin joined 1.Lig club Şanlıurfaspor.

== International career ==
Şahin represented Turkey at the 2013 FIFA U-20 World Cup.

== Career statistics ==
As of match played 29 November 2023

Appearances and goals by club, season and competition
Club	Season	League			National Cup		Other		Total	
Club	Season	Division	Apps	Goals	Apps	Goals	Apps	Goals	Apps	Goals
İstanbul Başakşehir	2011–12	Süper Lig	2	0	0	0	—		2	0
İstanbul Başakşehir	2012–13	Süper Lig	5	0	0	0	—		5	0
İstanbul Başakşehir	2013–14	TFF First League	25	4	1	1	—		26	5
İstanbul Başakşehir	2014–15	Süper Lig	18	1	8	1	—		26	2
İstanbul Başakşehir	2015–16	Süper Lig	16	0	7	0	—		23	0
İstanbul Başakşehir	Total		66	5	16	2	0	0	82	7
FC St. Pauli (loan)	2016–17	2. Bundesliga	27	4	2	0	—		29	4
FC St. Pauli	2017–18	2. Bundesliga	23	2	1	0	—		24	2
FC St. Pauli	2018–19	2. Bundesliga	7	0	1	0	—		8	0
FC St. Pauli	2019–20	2. Bundesliga	0	0	1	0	—		1	0
FC St. Pauli	Total		57	6	5	0	0	0	62	6
FC Ingolstadt 04 (loan)	2018–19	2. Bundesliga	9	0	0	0	—		9	0
Kayserispor	2019–20	Süper Lig	11	0	0	0	—		11	0
Gaziantep	2020–21	Süper Lig	26	1	3	0	—		29	1
Gaziantep	2021–22	Süper Lig	2	0	1	0	—		3	0
Gaziantep	Total		28	1	4	0	0	0	32	1
Bursaspor	2021–22	TFF First League	10	1	0	0	—		10	1
Bursaspor	2022–23	TFF Second League	27	10	0	0	—		27	10
Bursaspor	Total		37	11	0	0	0	0	37	11
Şanlıurfaspor	2023–24	TFF First League	6	0	0	0	—		6	0
Career total			214	23	25	2	0	0	239	25

== Controversy ==
In October 2019 Şahin stated open support for the Turkish operation in Northern Syria: "We stand on the side of our heroic military and the armies. Our prayers are with you!" This caused negative reactions among the fans of St. Pauli. Following the uproar, the club took the decision to release the player from the club even though his wages would be paid.
