= Osman Can Çötür =

Turkish footballer

Personal information
- Date of birth: 13 September 2001 (age 25)
- Place of birth: Sorgun, Turkey
- Height: 1.87 m (6 ft 2 in)
- Position: Defender

Youth career
- 2013–2016: Sorgun Belediyespor
- 2016–2019: Kayserispor

Senior career*
Years	Team	Apps	(Gls)
2019–2021	Kayserispor	1	(0)
2021	Antalya Kemerspor	3	(0)
2021–2022	Arhavispor		
2022–2023	Talasgücü Belediyespor		
- * Club domestic league appearances and goals as of 1 May 2021

Osman Can Çötür (born 13 September 2001) is a Turkish professional footballer who plays as a defender.

== Professional career ==
Çötür made his professional debut for Kayserispor in a 6–2 Süper Lig loss to Trabzonspor on 28 December 2019.
