= Berna Gözbaşı =

Turkish businesswoman and sports administrator

President of Kayserispor
- In office 6 October 2019 – 17 December 2022
- Preceded by: Erol Bedir

Personal details
- Born: 30 June 1974 (age 52) Gelibolu, Çanakkale, Turkey
- Children: 2
- Education: Dokuz Eylül University
- Occupation: Businesswoman

Berna Gözbaşı is a Turkish businesswoman and sports executive. She was the first female president of Kayserispor football club, which plays in Turkey's senior men's league.

== Biography ==
1974 – Berna Gözbaşı was born to a petty officer father and a schoolteacher mother in Gelibolu, Çanakkale Province, Turkey. She was educated in business administration in English at the Dokuz Eylül University in İzmir, and graduated in 1996.

She has two daughters.

== Business career ==
Gözbaşı started her professional career as the export manager at the zinc-lead metal industry "Çinkır" in Kayseri. In 2001, she founded her first business, BRN Consulting and Foreign Trade Ltd., after she studied international finance, Meta Trade, futures, and option at the London Metal Exchange. Between 2001 and 2006, she helped many small and medium-sized enterprises entering the export business in the Middle East, East Africa, and West Africa. In 2006, she established the BRN Bed company to produce mattresses and bed bases. She exported her products into more than 60 countries on five continents, and was cited as a role model for young entrepreneurs.

In 2011, Gözbaşı was named one of the ten "Most Successful Entrepreneurs" by the European Business Awards, and received the Ruban d'Honneur. Her company was listed in 2012 as one of the 25 "Fastest-Growing Companies" by the Union of Chambers and Commodity Exchanges of Turkey (TOBB) and Harvard University's "All World Network – Turkey".

She is the first female member of the Kayseri Chamber of Industry.

== Sports career ==
During her youth, Gözbaşı was an active basketball player. She was admitted to the board of directors at Kayserispor, and later became vice chairperson.

Erol Bedir, the club president of Kayserispor, which play in the Turkish top-level men's league of Süper Lig, resigned on 6 October 2019, following the request of the honorary club president Mehmet Özhaseki. After serving three years on the club board, Gözbaşı was elected president of the football club with the support of the local political leaders, former government ministers, leaders of non-governmental organizations, and the president of the TOBB M. Rifat Hisarcıklıoğlu. Gözbaşı commented on her presidency that "the chair would not have been offered to her if the team had not been at the bottom of the league table". She expressed her determination to improve the club's situation in the 2019–20 Süper Lig season by making decisions earlier. Upon the resignation of President Erol Bedir in 2019, she was elected president at the Extraordinary General Assembly and became the first women's football club president in the history of the Süper Lig. She was re-elected to this post in 2021.

Gözbaşı is the first female president of a Turkish men's football club playing in the country's top-level league.
