= Ümran Zambak =

Dutch footballer

Personal information
- Full name: Ümran Zambak
- Date of birth: November 27, 2000 (age 25)
- Place of birth: Almelo, Netherlands
- Position: Forward

Team information
- Current team: SV Schermbeck

Youth career
- Oranje Nassau (Almelo)
- HVV Tubantia
- Kayserispor U19

Senior career*
| Years | Team | Apps | (Gls) |
| 2019–2020 | Kayserispor | 4 | (1) |
| 2020– | Yalovaspor | 5 | (0) |
| 2021-2022 | Brandenburger SC Süd 05 | 23 | (9) |
| 2022-2023 | HHC Hardenberg U23 | 13 | (6) |
- * Club domestic league appearances and goals as of 7 March 2020

Ümran Zambak (born 27 November 2000) is a Dutch professional footballer who plays as a forward for SV Schermbeck. He has also Turkish nationality.

== Professional career ==
On 3 September 2019, Zambak signed his first professional contract with Kayserispor. He signed for five years. In his professional debut game in a Turkish Cup tie against Bayrampaşa he scored the 1–0. Zambak made his Süper Lig debut for Kayserispor in a 6–2 loss to Trabzonspor on 28 December 2019.
