= Hasan Hüseyin Acar =

Turkish footballer (born 1994)

Personal information
- Date of birth: 16 December 1994 (age 31)
- Place of birth: Eskişehir, Turkey
- Height: 1.83 m (6 ft 0 in)
- Position: Midfielder

Team information
- Current team: Şanlıurfaspor
- Number: 26

Youth career
- 2007–2011: Eskişehirspor

Senior career*
Years	Team	Apps	(Gls)
2011–2018	Eskişehirspor	66	(16)
2015	→ Göztepe (loan)	13	(1)
2016	→ Tokatspor (loan)	3	(0)
2018–2020	Kayserispor	48	(6)
2021	Alanyaspor	4	(0)
2021–2022	Ankaragücü	8	(0)
2022–2023	Altınordu	10	(0)
2023	İskenderunspor	15	(3)
2023–2024	Diyarbekirspor	43	(8)
2024–	Şanlıurfaspor	38	(4)

International career^{‡}
2013	Turkey U20	3	(0)
- * Club domestic league appearances and goals as of 30 November 2025 ‡ National team caps and goals as of 21:05, 19 January 2014 (UTC)

Hasan Hüseyin Acar (born 16 December 1994) is a Turkish footballer who plays as a midfielder for TFF 2. Lig club Şanlıurfaspor.

== Club career ==
He made his Süper Lig debut on 18 August 2013. On 11 June 2018, he signed a three-year contract with Kayserispor. On 31 August 2022, Acar signed a one-year deal with Altınordu.
