= Michael Martin (footballer, born 2000) =

German footballer (born 2000)

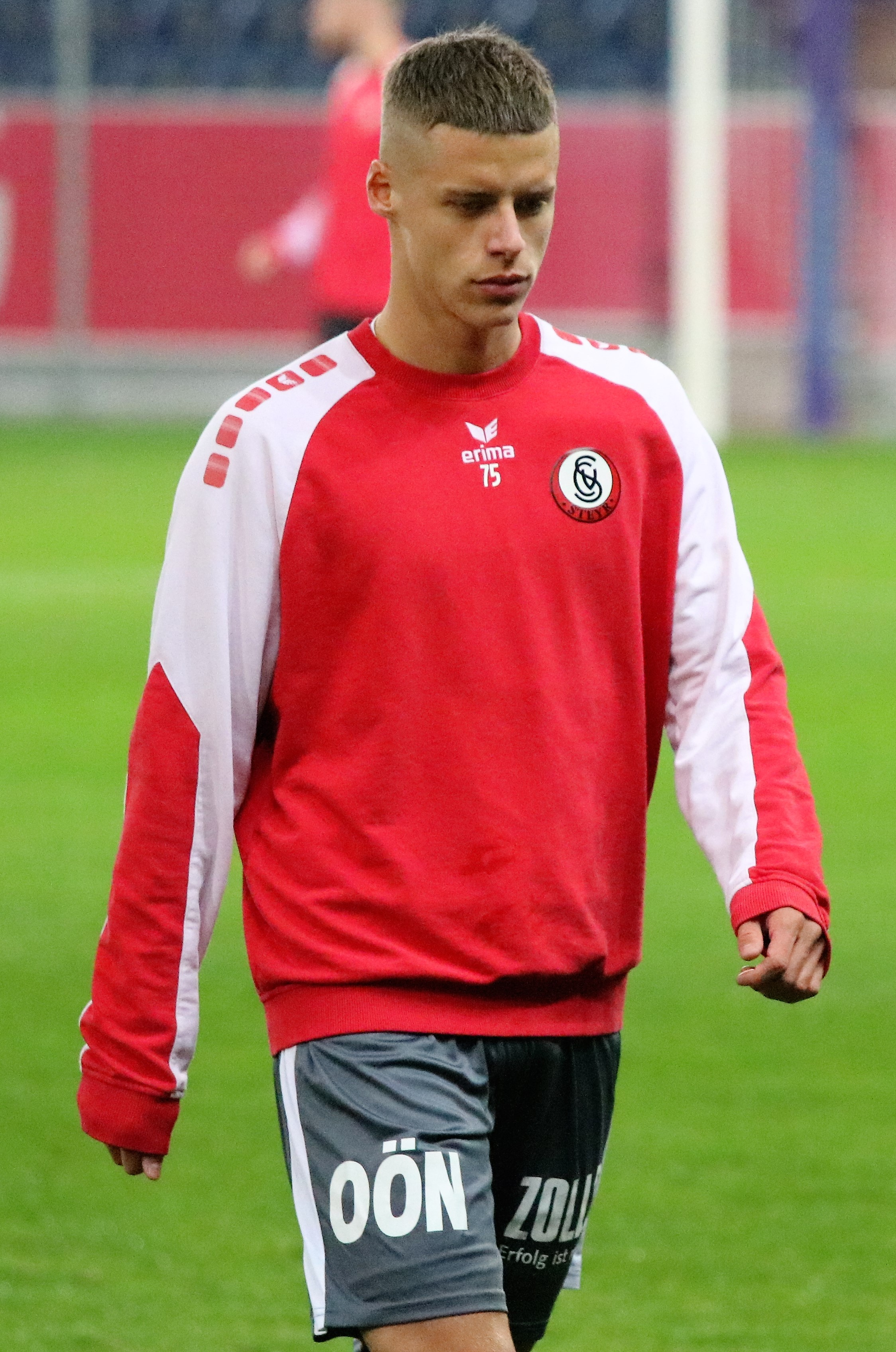
- Martin in 2021

Personal information
- Date of birth: 10 July 2000 (age 26)
- Place of birth: Crailsheim, Germany
- Height: 1.80 m (5 ft 11 in)
- Position: Midfielder

Youth career
- SpVgg Gröningen-Satteldorf
- VfB Stuttgart
- –2015: VfR Aalen
- 2015–2017: 1. FC Heidenheim
- 2017–2019: VfL Bochum

Senior career*
Years	Team	Apps	(Gls)
2020	Sportfreunde Schwäbisch Hall		
2021	FC Bayern Alzenau	19	(5)
2021–2022	SK Vorwärts Steyr	14	(4)
2022–2023	SV Ried	30	(0)
2023	SC Paderborn	4	(0)
2024–	IK Sirius	4	(0)
2024	→ Dynamo České Budějovice (loan)	3	(0)
2024–2025	→ FC Emmen (loan)	28	(1)
- * Club domestic league appearances and goals as of 30 August 2026

Michael Martin (born 10 July 2000) is a German professional footballer who plays as a midfielder.

== Early life ==
Martin was born on 10 July 2000. Born in Crailsheim, Germany, he is a native of the city. His parents are originally from Kyrgyzstan.

== Career ==
Martin started his career with German side Sportfreunde Schwäbisch Hall in 2020. Six months later, he signed for German side FC Bayern Alzenau, where he made nineteen league appearances and scored five goals before signing for Austrian side SK Vorwärts Steyr in 2021, where he made fourteen league appearances and scored four goals. Austrian news website Laola1 wrote in 2022 that he "immediately became a key player in the Steyr team" while playing for the club.

One year later, he signed for Austrian side SV Ried, where he made thirty league appearances and scored zero goals and suffered relegation from the top flight to the second tier. Following his stint there, he signed for German side SC Paderborn in 2023, where he made four league appearances and scored zero goals. Ahead of the 2024 season, he signed for Swedish side IK Sirius Fotboll. During the summer of 2024, he was sent on loan to Czech side Dynamo České Budějovice, where he made three league appearances and scored one goal. The same year, he was sent on loan to Dutch side FC Emmen, where he made twenty-eight league appearances and scored one goal. He returned to Sirius, only to be released in March 2026.
