= Selahattin Seyhun =

Turkish footballer

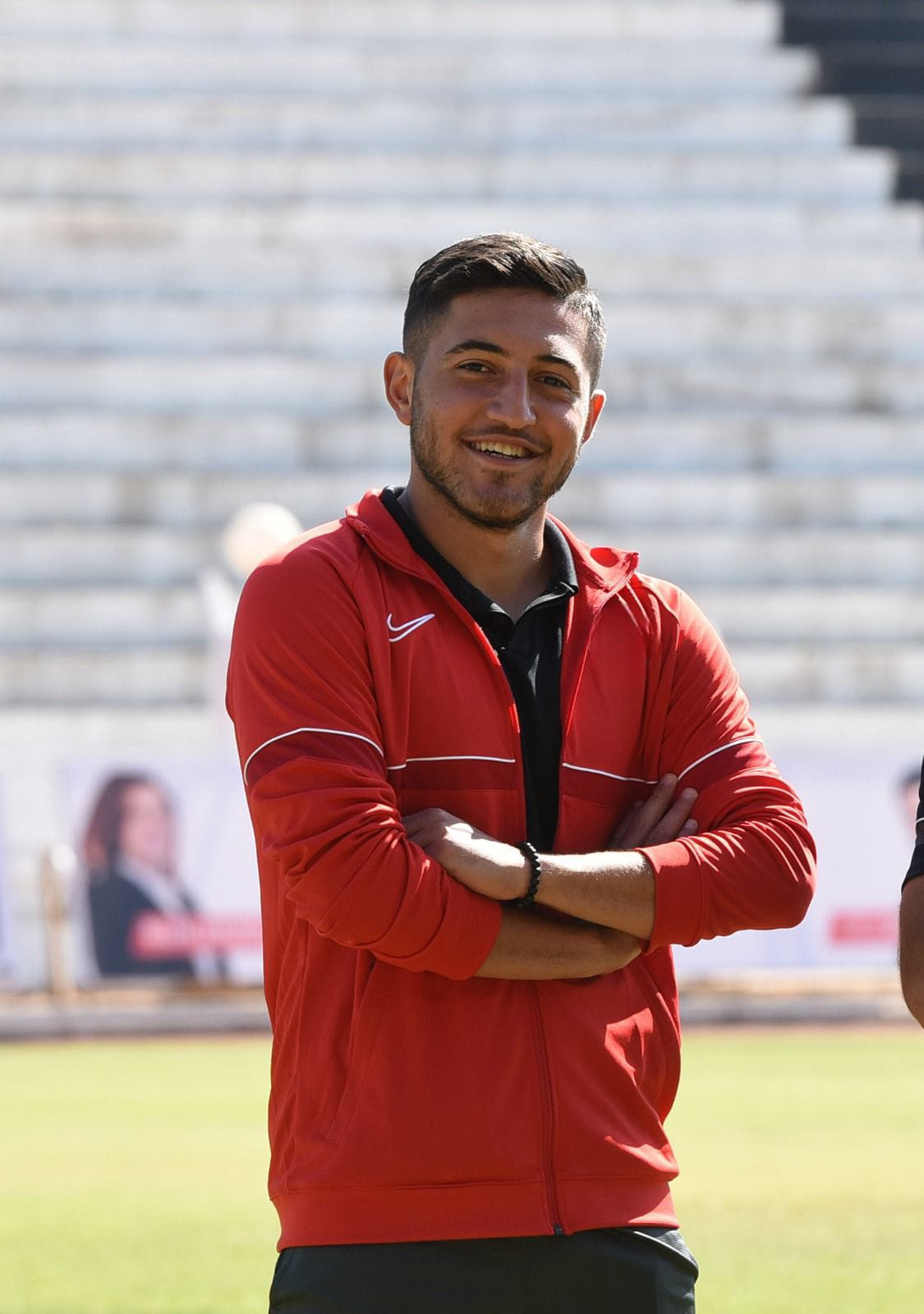
- Selahattin Seyhun'un in 2022

Personal information
- Date of birth: 28 June 1999 (age 27)
- Place of birth: Develi, Turkey
- Position: Forward

Team information
- Current team: Çatalcaspor
- Number: 99

Youth career
- 2011–2012: Fenerbahçe
- 2012–2014: Kasımpaşa
- 2014–2015: Beykozspor
- 2015–2017: Bağcılarspor
- 2017–2019: Kayserispor

Senior career*
Years	Team	Apps	(Gls)
2019–2020	Kayserispor	1	(0)
2020–	Bucaspor 1928	0	(0)
2020–2021	→ Çarşambaspor (loan)	21	(3)
2021–2022	→ Kuşadasıspor (loan)	15	(0)
2022	→ GAK (loan)	11	(2)
2022–	→ Çatalcaspor (loan)	3	(0)
- * Club domestic league appearances and goals as of 15 October 2022

Selahattin Seyhun (born 28 June 1999) is a Turkish professional footballer who plays as a forward for Çatalcaspor on loan from Bucaspor 1928.

== Professional career ==
On 5 December 2019, Seyhun signed his first professional contract with Kayserispor for 5 years. Seyhun made his professional debut for Kayserispor in a 6–2 Süper Lig loss to Trabzonspor on 28 December 2019.
