= Stelios Kokovas =

Greek footballer

Personal information
- Full name: Stylianos Kokovas
- Date of birth: 6 July 2001 (age 25)
- Place of birth: Larissa, Greece
- Height: 1.86 m (6 ft 1 in)
- Position: Centre-back

Team information
- Current team: Erzgebirge Aue
- Number: 29

Youth career
- –2017: Anagennisi Kalochoriou
- 2017–2020: VfL Bochum

Senior career*
Years	Team	Apps	(Gls)
2019–2021	VfL Bochum	6	(0)
2021–2023	Karviná	3	(0)
2021–2022	→ Pohronie (loan)	11	(0)
2024–2026	Phönix Lübeck	52	(12)
2026–	Erzgebirge Aue	9	(0)

International career^{‡}
2018–2019	Greece U18	6	(0)
2019	Greece U19	3	(0)
- * Club domestic league appearances and goals as of 23 September 2026 ‡ National team caps and goals as of 17:06, 1 April 2019 (UTC)

Stylianos "Stelios" Kokovas (Greek: Στυλιανός "Στέλιος" Κόκοβας; born 6 July 2001) is a Greek professional footballer who plays as a centre-back for German club Erzgebirge Aue.

== Club career ==
Kokovas made his professional debut for VfL Bochum in the 2. Bundesliga on 30 March 2019, starting in the home match against Hamburger SV, which finished as a 0–0 draw.

== International career ==
Kokovas was called up to the Greece national under-18 team in December 2018, appearing in a friendly match against Italy, which finished as a 4–1 away loss.
