= Marvin Sinan Büyüksakarya =

German footballer

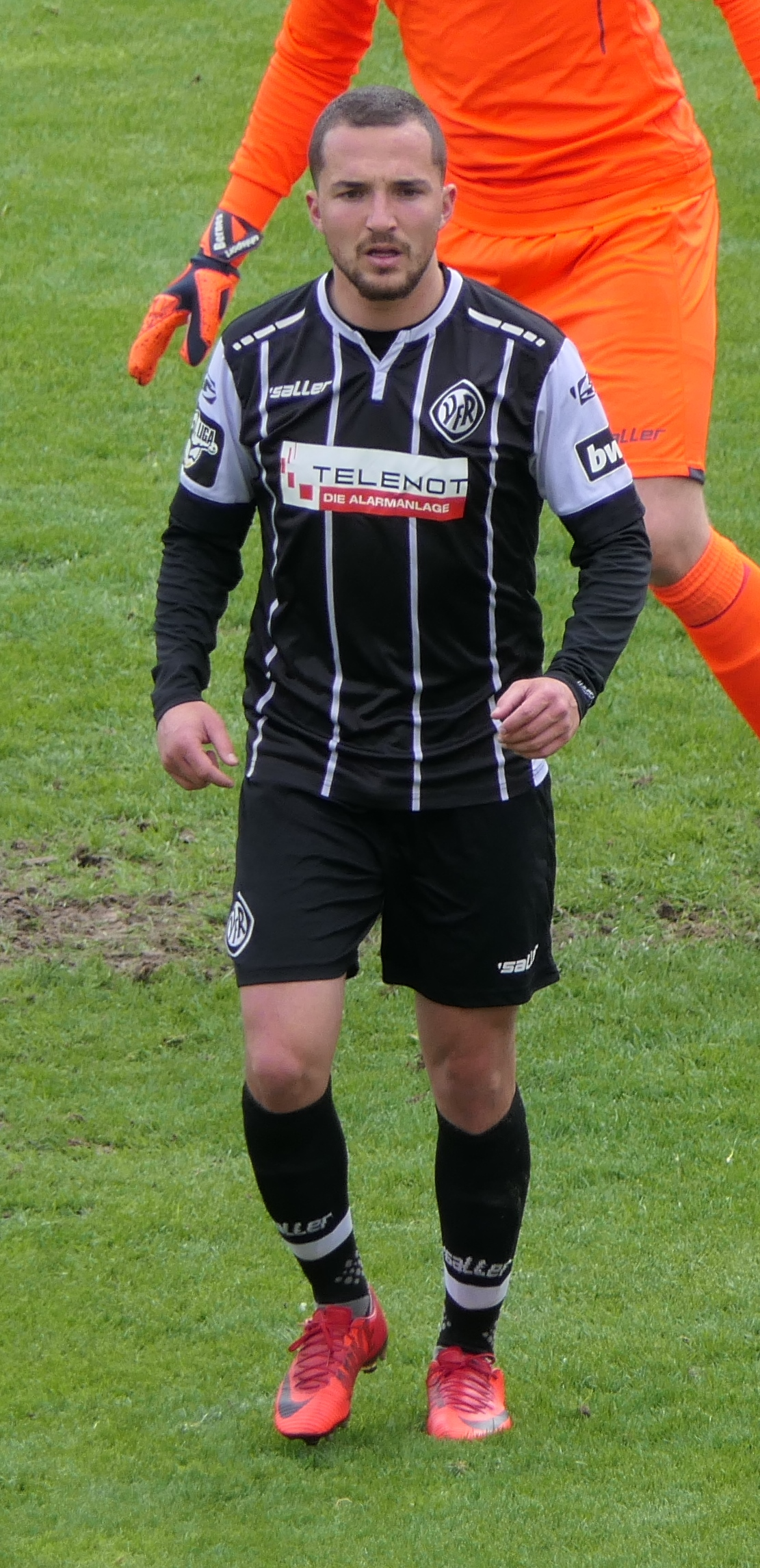

Personal information
- Date of birth: 11 April 1995 (age 31)
- Place of birth: Nürtingen, Germany
- Height: 1.72 m (5 ft 8 in)
- Position: Right back

Team information
- Current team: TuS Dassendorf
- Number: 4

Youth career
- FV SF Neuhausen
- VfB Stuttgart

Senior career*
Years	Team	Apps	(Gls)
2014–2015	VfB Stuttgart II	1	(0)
2016	SSV Reutlingen	9	(2)
2016–2018	SC Wiedenbrück	63	(6)
2018–2019	VfR Aalen	25	(0)
2019–2020	Adanaspor	13	(0)
2020–2022	Turgutluspor	59	(1)
2023	SC Wiedenbrück	6	(0)
2023–2024	Berliner AK 07	6	(0)
2024–	TuS Dassendorf	11	(0)

International career
2012	Turkey U18	2	(0)
2012–2013	Germany U18	7	(0)
2013–2014	Germany U19	5	(0)
- * Club domestic league appearances and goals as of 17 May 2024

Marvin Sinan Büyüksakarya (born 11 April 1995) is a German footballer who plays for TuS Dassendorf.

== Career ==
He made his 3. Liga debut on 14 March 2015.
