= Erman Bulucu =

Turkish footballer

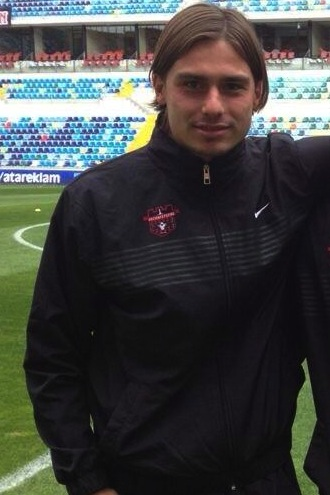

Personal information
- Date of birth: 9 March 1989 (age 37)
- Place of birth: Akhisar, Turkey
- Height: 1.86 m (6 ft 1 in)
- Position: Defender

Team information
- Current team: Belediye Derincespor
- Number: 21

Youth career
- –2006: Akhisarspor
- 2006–2008: Manisaspor
- 2008: → Aliaga Belediye (loan)
- 2008–2009: Alaçatıspor

Senior career*
Years	Team	Apps	(Gls)
2009–2012	Menemen Belediye	20	(1)
2012–2013	Sancaktepe Belediye	31	(2)
2013–2015	Gaziantepspor	1	(0)
2015	Alanyaspor	8	(0)
2015–2017	Manisaspor	48	(6)
2017–2018	Elazığspor	13	(2)
2018	BB Erzurumspor	5	(0)
2018	Altay	0	(0)
2018–2020	Manisa	33	(4)
2020–2021	Amed	31	(3)
2021–2022	Pendikspor	13	(0)
2022	Tarsus İdman Yurdu	15	(0)
2022–2023	Kastamonuspor 1966	15	(0)
2023	İnegölspor	17	(4)
2023–	Belediye Derincespor	5	(0)
- * Club domestic league appearances and goals as of 23 September 2023

Erman Bulucu (born 9 March 1989) is a Turkish footballer who plays as a center back for TFF Second League club Belediye Derincespor.
