= Umut Sönmez =

Azerbaijani footballer (born 1993)

Personal information
- Date of birth: 20 June 1993 (age 33)
- Place of birth: Varto, Muş, Turkey
- Height: 1.82 m (6 ft 0 in)
- Position: Midfielder

Team information
- Current team: VfR Aalen
- Number: 22

Youth career
- 2010–2013: FC Augsburg

Senior career*
Years	Team	Apps	(Gls)
2012–2013	FC Augsburg II	2	(0)
2013–2014	FC Memmingen	42	(12)
2014–2015	Orduspor	14	(1)
2015–2016	Gaziantep BB	38	(5)
2016–2017	Kayserispor	13	(0)
2017	Adana Demirspor	6	(0)
2018–2019	Manisa	7	(1)
2019–2020	Tuzlaspor	27	(3)
2020–2021	24 Erzincanspor	14	(1)
2021	Pendikspor	18	(5)
2021–2022	Sakaryaspor	21	(1)
2022–2023	İnegölspor	11	(0)
2023	Fethiyespor	11	(0)
2023–	VfR Aalen	0	(0)

International career
2014	Azerbaijan U21	1	(0)
- * Club domestic league appearances and goals as of 23 September 2023

Umut Sönmez (born 20 June 1993) is an Azerbaijani footballer who plays for German Regionalliga club VfR Aalen. He plays as a midfielder, and can work in both an offensive and creative role.

== Career ==
Sönmez is a youth product of the German side FC Augsburg, and made his senior debut with their reserves in 2013. He followed that up with a stint at FC Memmingen, before moving to Turkey with Orduspor and Gaziantep BB. In 2016, he made his professional debut with Süper Lig side Kayserispor, He followed that up with successive stints at Adana Demirspor, Manisa, Tuzlaspor, 24 Erzincanspor, Pendikspor, and Sakaryaspor.

On 15 September 2023, Sönmez signed with VfR Aalen in Regionalliga.

== International career ==
Sönmez was born in Turkey to parents of Azerbaijani descent, and was raised in Germany. He debuted for Azerbaijan U21 in a friendly 1–1 tie with Moldova U21 on 5 March 2014.
