= Hasan Bilal =

Turkish football player

Personal information
- Date of birth: 12 March 1998 (age 28)
- Place of birth: Istanbul, Turkey
- Height: 1.74 m (5 ft 9 in)
- Position: Midfielder

Team information
- Current team: Sakaryaspor
- Number: 18

Youth career
- 2009–2011: Rami S.K.
- 2011–2012: Galatasaray
- 2012–2017: Kasımpaşa

Senior career*
Years	Team	Apps	(Gls)
2017–2022	Kasımpaşa	18	(0)
2019–2020	→ Keçiörengücü (loan)	1	(0)
2020–2021	→ Sakaryaspor (loan)	28	(10)
2021–2022	→ Dıyarbakır Spor (loan)	12	(0)
2022	→ Serik Belediyespor (loan)	15	(1)
2022–2026	Vanspor FK	102	(29)
2026–	Sakaryaspor	4	(1)

International career
2015	Turkey U18	3	(0)
- * Club domestic league appearances and goals as of 1 October 2026

Hasan Bilal (born 12 March 1998) is a Turkish football player who plays as a midfielder for Sakaryaspor.

== Professional career ==
Bilal made his professional debut for Kasımpaşa in a 4-2 Süper Lig win over Çaykur Rizespor on 12 May 2017.
