= Aaron Herzog =

German footballer

Personal information
- Full name: Aaron Philipp Herzog
- Date of birth: 30 January 1998 (age 28)
- Place of birth: Cologne, Germany
- Height: 1.82 m (6 ft 0 in)
- Position: Midfielder

Team information
- Current team: SC Fliesteden 1931

Youth career
- –2009: SV Blau-Weiß Kerpen
- 2009–2017: Borussia Mönchengladbach

Senior career*
Years	Team	Apps	(Gls)
2017–2020	Borussia Mönchengladbach II	78	(7)
2020–2021	Hansa Rostock	13	(0)
2020	Hansa Rostock II	3	(0)
2021–2023	Hallescher FC	42	(1)
2023–2024	Alemannia Aachen	8	(0)
2024	VfB Lübeck	6	(2)
2024–	SC Fliesteden 1931		

International career^{‡}
2013–2014	Germany U16	4	(0)
2016	Germany U18	1	(0)
- * Club domestic league appearances and goals as of 22 May 2024 ‡ National team caps and goals as of 17:18, 14 September 2020 (UTC)

Aaron Philipp Herzog (born 30 January 1998) is a German professional footballer who plays as a midfielder for SC Fliesteden 1931.

== Career ==
Herzog made his professional debut for Hansa Rostock in the first round of the 2020–21 DFB-Pokal on 13 September 2020, coming on as a substitute in the 81st minute for Jan Löhmannsröben against Bundesliga club VfB Stuttgart. The home match finished as a 1–0 loss.

On 6 June 2023, Herzog signed with Alemannia Aachen in Regionalliga.

On 26 January 2024, Herzog joined 3. Liga club VfB Lübeck on a 1.5-year deal.
