= Hakan Çıtak =

Turkish association football player

Personal information
- Date of birth: 2 March 1999 (age 27)
- Place of birth: Istanbul, Turkey
- Position: Midfielder

Team information
- Current team: Develi Spor

Youth career
- 2010–2016: Kayseri Şekerspor
- 2016–2018: Kayserispor

Senior career*
Years	Team	Apps	(Gls)
2018–2020	Kayserispor	2	(0)
2021–2022	Emar Grup FK		
2022–	Develi Spor		
- * Club domestic league appearances and goals ‡ National team caps and goals as of 13 September 2020

Hakan Çıtak (born 2 March 1999) is a Turkish professional footballer who plays as a midfielder for the amateur club Develi Spor.

== Professional career ==
Çıtak made his professional debut with Kayserispor in a 3–0 Süper Lig loss to Galatasaray on 10 November 2018.
