= Mert Kula =

Turkish professional footballer (born 1995)

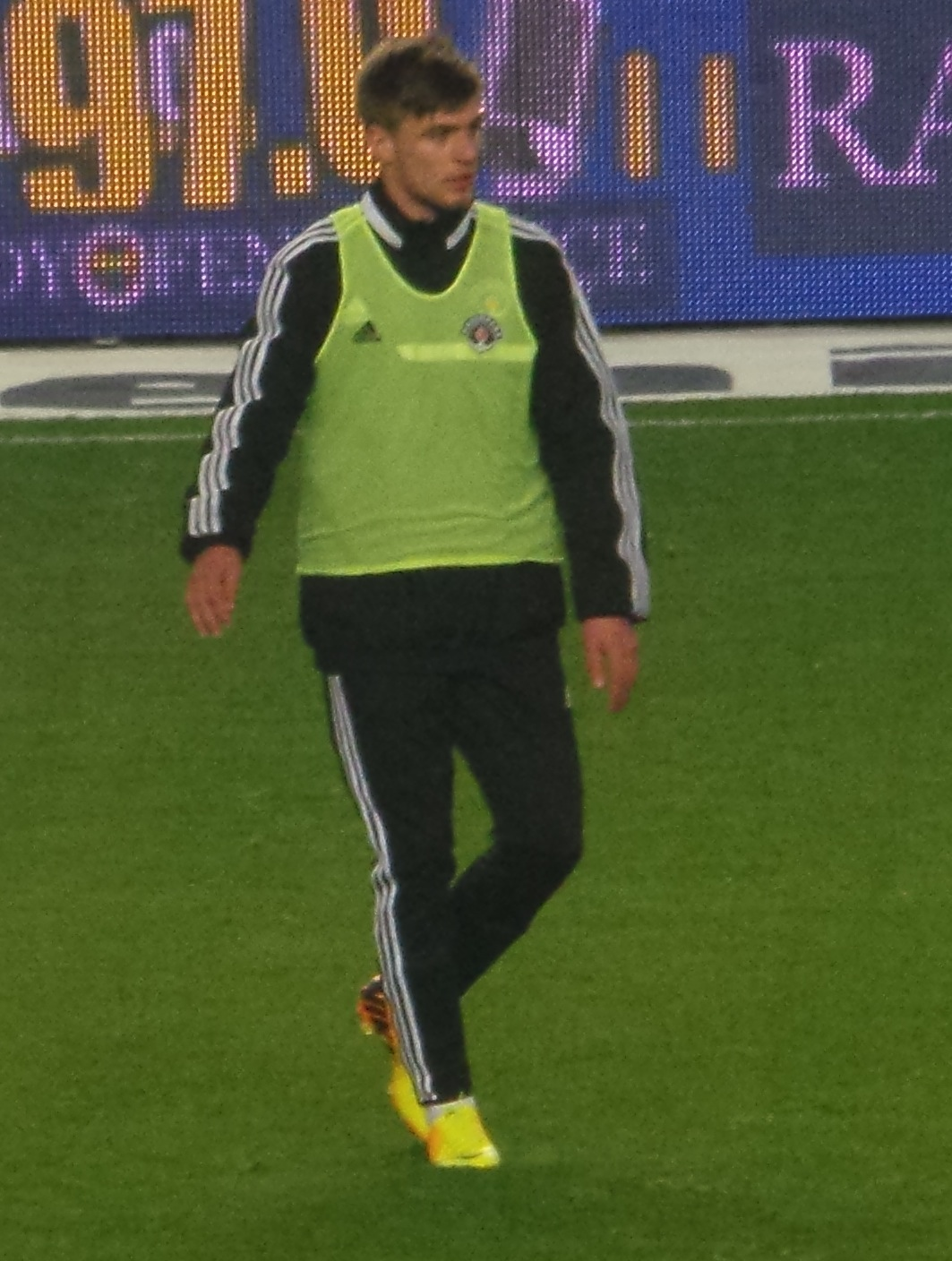

Personal information
- Date of birth: 1 January 1995 (age 31)
- Place of birth: Çatalca, Turkey
- Height: 1.85 m (6 ft 1 in)
- Position: Defender

Team information
- Current team: Muşspor
- Number: 5

Youth career
- 2008–2009: İstanbul Gençlerbirliği
- 2009–2014: Kasımpaşa

Senior career*
Years	Team	Apps	(Gls)
2014–2018	Kasımpaşa	2	(0)
2016–2017	→ Sarıyer (loan)	31	(1)
2018	Menemen Belediyespor	26	(2)
2019	Sarıyer	10	(1)
2019–2021	Kayserispor	7	(0)
2020–2021	→ Ankara Keçiörengücü (loan)	22	(0)
2021–2023	Gençlerbirliği	26	(0)
2023–2025	Ankara Keçiörengücü	18	(1)
2025–	Muşspor	8	(0)

International career^{‡}
2014	Turkey U19	1	(0)
- * Club domestic league appearances and goals as of 19 October 2025 ‡ National team caps and goals as of 20 January 2020

Mert Kula (born 1 January 1995) is a Turkish professional footballer who plays as a defender for TFF 2. Lig club Muşspor.

== Professional career ==
Mert made his professional debut for Kasımpaşa in a 2–0 Süper Lig loss to Beşiktaş J.K. on 23 November 2014. Kula made his Turkey U19 debut in a 5-2 loss against Hungary U19 on 23 April 2014.
