= Ömer Uzun =

Turkish football player

Personal information
- Date of birth: 23 February 2000 (age 26)
- Place of birth: Dortmund, Germany
- Height: 1.85 m (6 ft 1 in)
- Position: Forward

Team information
- Current team: Malatya Yeşilyurt SK
- Number: 13

Youth career
- –2014: FSV Witten
- 2014–2019: VfL Bochum

Senior career*
Years	Team	Apps	(Gls)
2019–2021	Kayserispor	5	(1)
2021–2022	Ankara Keçiörengücü	5	(0)
2022	→ Nazilli Belediyespor (loan)	11	(2)
2022–2023	Şanlıurfaspor	4	(0)
2023–2024	Rot Weiss Ahlen	26	(10)
2024–2026	Rot-Weiß Erfurt	38	(6)
2026-	Malatya Yeşilyurt SK	9	(2)

International career^{‡}
2018–2019	Turkey U19	8	(3)
- * Club domestic league appearances and goals as of 9 October 2025 ‡ National team caps and goals as of 26 March 2019

Ömer Uzun (born 23 February 2000) is a professional footballer who plays as a forward for Malatya Yeşilyurt SK in the TFF 3. Lig. Born in Germany, he has represented Turkey at youth level.

== Professional career ==
On 6 July 2019, Uzun signed a professional contract with Kayserispor. Uzun made his professional debut with Kayserispor in a 4-1 Süper Lig loss to İstanbul Başakşehir on 22 December 2019.
