= 2026–27 SC Freiburg season =

SC Freiburg
2026–27 season
- President: Eberhard Fugmann
- Head coach: Julian Schuster
- Stadium: Europa-Park Stadion
- Bundesliga: 1st
- DFB-Pokal: Second round
- UEFA Conference League: League phase
Home colours	Away colours	European colours

The 2026–27 season is the 123rd season in the history of SC Freiburg, and the club's eleventh consecutive season in the Bundesliga. In addition to the domestic league, the club is also participating in the DFB-Pokal and the UEFA Conference League.

== Players ==
As of 15 September 2026.

Note: Flags indicate national team as defined under FIFA eligibility rules; some limited exceptions apply. Players may hold more than one non-FIFA nationality.

No.	Pos.	Nation	Player
1	GK	GER	Noah Atubolu
3	DF	AUT	Philipp Lienhart
4	DF	GER	Kenneth Schmidt
5	DF	GER	Manuel Gulde
6	MF	GER	Patrick Osterhage
7	FW	GER	Derry Scherhant
8	MF	GER	Maximilian Eggestein
9	FW	GER	Lucas Höler
14	MF	JPN	Yuito Suzuki
16	MF	GER	Yannik Engelhardt
19	MF	GER	Jan-Niklas Beste
20	MF	JPN	Rihito Yamamoto
21	GK	GER	Florian Müller
22	FW	CIV	Cyriaque Irié

No.	Pos.	Nation	Player
23	MF	KOS	Florent Muslija
24	GK	GER	Jannik Huth
25	DF	FRA	Kiliann Sildillia
27	MF	GER	Nicolas Höfler
28	DF	GER	Matthias Ginter
30	DF	GER	Christian Günter (captain)
31	FW	CRO	Igor Matanović
32	MF	ITA	Vincenzo Grifo (captain)
33	DF	COD	Jordy Makengo
37	DF	GER	Max Rosenfelder
38	FW	GER	Michael Gregoritsch
39	MF	GER	Rouven Tarnutzer
42	FW	JPN	Keisuke Goto
44	GK	GER	Mio Backhaus

== Transfers ==
=== In ===
Pos.	Player	Transferred from	Fee	Date	Source
GK	(Germany) Mio Backhaus	(Germany) Werder Bremen	Undisclosed	12 July 2026	
DF	(Turkey) Berkay Yilmaz	(Germany) 1. FC Nürnberg	End of loan	1 July 2026	
MF	(Germany) Yannik Engelhardt	(Italy) Como	Undisclosed	18 July 2026	
FW	(Japan) Keisuke Goto	(Belgium) Anderlecht	Undisclosed	1 July 2026	
FW	(Tunisia) Louey Ben Farhat	(Germany) Karlsruher SC	Undisclosed	1 July 2026	

=== Out ===
Pos.	Player	Transferred to	Fee	Date	Source
FW	(Germany) Noah Weißhaupt	(Germany) Darmstadt 98	Undisclosed	15 June 2026	
MF	(Germany) Robert Wagner	(Germany) Dynamo Dresden	Undisclosed	23 June 2026	
MF	(Germany) Merlin Röhl	(England) Everton	Undisclosed	1 July 2026	
MF	(Switzerland) Johan Manzambi	(England) Aston Villa	Undisclosed	17 July 2026	
FW	(Germany) Eren Dinkçi	(Germany) Werder Bremen	Loan	17 August 2026	
DF	(Germany) Karl Steinmann	(Germany) Hannover 96	Loan	25 August 2026	
GK	(Germany) Noah Atubolu	(Germany) Eintracht Frankfurt	Loan	28 August 2026	
FW	(Tunisia) Louey Ben Farhat	(Germany) Karlsruher SC	Loan	1 September 2026	

== Pre-season and friendlies ==
Win Draw Loss

24 July 2026 Friendly	SC Freiburg (Germany)	3–1	(England) Derby County	Imst, Austria
16:00 CEST (UTC+2)	Irié 9'; Grifo; Catak	SC Freiburg		Stadium: Velly Arena; Attendance: 900

31 July 2026 Friendly	SC Freiburg (Germany)	0–3	(Germany) Greuther Fürth	Schruns, Austria
14:00 CEST (UTC+2)		SC Freiburg		Stadium: Sportanlage Golm

8 August 2026 Friendly	SC Freiburg (Germany)	1–0	(France) Strasbourg	Freiburg
12:30 CEST (UTC+2)				Stadium: Europa-Park Stadion; Referee: Martin Wilke

8 August 2026 Friendly	SC Freiburg (Germany)	2–0	(France) Strasbourg	Freiburg
15:30 CEST (UTC+2)	Höler; Höler	SC Freiburg		Stadium: Europa-Park Stadion; Referee: Martin Wilke

15 August 2026 Friendly	SC Freiburg (Germany)	3–0	(England) Crystal Palace	Freiburg
14:00 CEST (UTC+2)	Engelhardt; Höler; Scherhant	SC Freiburg		Stadium: Europa-Park Stadion; Attendance: 29,000

== Competitions ==
=== Bundesliga ===
==== League table ====
Pos	Team	Pld	W	D	L	GF	GA	GD	Pts	Qualification or relegation
1	Borussia Dortmund	10	7	3	0	17	7	+10	24	Qualification for the Champions League league phase
2	Bayern Munich	10	6	4	0	30	10	+20	22	Qualification for the Champions League league phase
3	SC Freiburg	10	7	1	2	21	10	+11	22	Qualification for the Champions League league phase
4	RB Leipzig	10	7	0	3	32	14	+18	21	Qualification for the Champions League league phase
5	Bayer Leverkusen	10	6	1	3	24	17	+7	19	Qualification for the Europa League league phase (Note: The 2026–27 DFB-Pokal winners also qualify for the Europa League league stage (or the sixth-placed team if the DFB-Pokal winners finish in the top five of the Bundesliga). If the DFB-Pokal winners finish in the top six of the Bundesliga, the Conference League spot will be passed to the seventh-placed team.)

Updated to match(es) played on 21 November 2026. Source: Bundesliga
Rules for classification: 1) Points; 2) Goal difference; 3) Goals scored; 4) Head-to-head aggregate results; 5) Head-to-head away goals scored; 6) Away goals scored; 7) Play-off at neutral site.
(Rules 4–6 only apply after all home-and-away matches have been played between the tied teams. Rule 7 only applies after the completion of the season.)

==== Results summary ====
Overall								Home						Away					
Pld	W	D	L	GF	GA	GD	Pts	W	D	L	GF	GA	GD	W	D	L	GF	GA	GD
8	5	1	2	18	10	+8	16	3	0	1	12	5	+7	2	1	1	6	5	+1

Last updated: 31 October 2026.
Source: DFB

==== Results by round ====
Round	1	2	3	4	5	6	7	8
Ground	H	A	H	A	H	A	H	A
Result	W	W	W	D	W	L	L	W
Position	2	2	1	2	1	3	3	

Updated to match(es) played on 31 October 2026. Source: DFB
A = Away; H = Home; W = Win; D = Draw; L = Loss

==== Matches ====
The league fixtures were unveiled on 2 July 2026.

30 August 2026 1	SC Freiburg	4–1	Werder Bremen	Freiburg
15:30 CEST (UTC+2)	Suzuki 29'; Matanović 45'; Suzuki 48'; Suzuki 55'	SC Freiburg	Stalmach 76'	Stadium: Europa-Park Stadion; Attendance: 34,700; Referee: Daniel Siebert

5 September 2026 2	Paderborn	0–1	SC Freiburg	Paderborn
15:30 CEST (UTC+2)		SC Freiburg	Eggestein 26'	Stadium: Home Deluxe Arena; Attendance: 15,000; Referee: Max Burda

12 September 2026 3	SC Freiburg	5–0	Borussia Mönchengladbach	Freiburg
15:30 CEST (UTC+2)	Engelhardt 23'; Matanović 29'; Matanović 77'; Engelhardt 79'; Eggestein 86'	SC Freiburg		Stadium: Europa-Park Stadion; Attendance: 34,700; Referee: Richard Hempel

19 September 2026 4	Eintracht Frankfurt	2–2	SC Freiburg	Frankfurt
15:30 CEST (UTC+2)	Onyedika (yellow card) 9'; Ebnoutalib 10'; Burkardt 36'; Højlund (yellow card) 56'		Scherhant 34'; Backhaus (yellow card) 37'; Suzuki 48'; Höler (yellow card) 88'	Stadium: Deutsche Bank Park; Referee: Sören Storks

11 October 2026 5	SC Freiburg	2–1	Schalke 04	Freiburg
17:30 CEST (UTC+2)	Eggestein 10'; Suzuki (yellow card) 49' (red card) 64'; Ginter (yellow card) 58'; Gotō 85'		Karaman 30'; Hwang Hee-chan (yellow card) 87'	Stadium: Europa-Park Stadion; Referee: Martin Petersen

18 October 2026 6	Bayer 04 Leverkusen	2–1	SC Freiburg	Leverkusen
15:30 CEST (UTC+2)	Maza 19'; Schick 76'	Report	Scherhant 14'; Treu (yellow card) 14'	Stadium: BayArena; Attendance: 30,210; Referee: Florian Badstübner

25 October 2026 7	SC Freiburg	1–3	FC Bayern Munich	Freiburg
17:30 CET (UTC+1)	Höler (yellow card) 25'; Beste (yellow card) 55'; Bischof 82' (o.g.); Eggestein (yellow card) 85'	Report	Upamecano 16'; Gnabry 42'; Tah (yellow card) 65'; Olise 90+5'	Stadium: Europa-Park Stadion; Referee: Felix Zwayer

31 October 2026 8	FC Augsburg	1–2	SC Freiburg	Augsburg
15:30 CET (UTC+1)	Gregoritsch 18'	Report	Eggestein (yellow card) 52'; Matanović 65'; Ginter (yellow card) 83'; Irié 85'; Grifo (yellow card) 90+1'	Stadium: WWK Arena; Referee: Christian Dingert

8 November 2026 9	SC Freiburg	2–0	Union Berlin	Freiburg
17:30 CET (UTC+1)	Matanović (yellow card) 2'; Engelhardt (yellow card) 27'; Suzuki 55'; Khedira 67'	Report	Van Den Bosch (yellow card) 20'; Jeong Woo-yeong (yellow card) 89'	Stadium: Europa-Park Stadion; Attendance: 33,400; Referee: Sascha Stegemann

21 November 2026 10	SV Elversberg	0–1	SC Freiburg	Spiesen-Elversberg
15:30 CET (UTC+1)			Beste (yellow card) 33'; Matanović 68', (yellow card) 70'; Lienhart (yellow card) 78'	Stadium: URSAPHARM-Arena an der Kaiserlinde; Attendance: 9,307; Referee: Richard Hempel

29 November 2026 11	SC Freiburg	v	RB Leipzig	Freiburg
15:30 CET (UTC+1)				Stadium: Europa-Park Stadion
