= Lukas Kübler =

German footballer

Personal information
- Date of birth: 30 August 1992 (age 34)
- Place of birth: Bonn, Germany
- Height: 1.81 m (5 ft 11 in)
- Position: Full-back

Team information
- Current team: SC Freiburg
- Number: 17

Youth career
- VfR Hangelar
- –2008: 1. FC Köln
- 2008–2009: Sportfreunde Troisdorf
- 2009–2010: Bonner SC

Senior career*
Years	Team	Apps	(Gls)
2010	Bonner SC	1	(0)
2011–2013	1. FC Köln II	54	(0)
2012–2013	1. FC Köln	1	(0)
2013–2015	SV Sandhausen	34	(0)
2015–	SC Freiburg	196	(12)
2019	SC Freiburg II	11	(1)
- * Club domestic league appearances and goals as of 31 October 2026

Lukas Kübler (born 30 August 1992) is a German professional footballer who plays as a full-back for Bundesliga club SC Freiburg.

== Club career ==
Kübler played for 1. FC Köln and SV Sandhausen before joining SC Freiburg in 2015. He scored his first Bundesliga goal in a 3–0 victory over FC Augsburg on 26 September 2021. A year later, on 13 October, he scored his first Europa League goal in a 4–0 away win over Nantes.

On 7 May 2026, he netted a brace in a 3–1 win over Braga in the Europa League semi-final second leg, securing his club's place in the final by winning 4–3 on aggregate.

== Career statistics ==
As of match played 31 October 2026

Appearances and goals by club, season and competition
Club	Season	League			DFB-Pokal		Europe		Total	
Club	Season	Division	Apps	Goals	Apps	Goals	Apps	Goals	Apps	Goals
Bonner SC	2009–10	Regionalliga West	1	0	—		—		1	0
1. FC Köln II	2011–12	Regionalliga West	27	0	—		—		27	0
1. FC Köln II	2012–13	Regionalliga West	27	0	—		—		27	0
1. FC Köln II	Total		54	0	—		0	0	54	0
1. FC Köln	2012–13	2. Bundesliga	1	0	0	0	—		1	0
SV Sandhausen	2013–14	2. Bundesliga	2	0	0	0	—		2	0
SV Sandhausen	2014–15	2. Bundesliga	32	0	1	1	—		33	1
SV Sandhausen	Total		34	0	1	1	0	0	35	1
SC Freiburg	2015–16	2. Bundesliga	0	0	0	0	—		0	0
SC Freiburg	2016–17	Bundesliga	16	0	0	0	—		16	0
SC Freiburg	2017–18	Bundesliga	15	0	1	0	0	0	16	0
SC Freiburg	2018–19	Bundesliga	16	0	0	0	—		16	0
SC Freiburg	2019–20	Bundesliga	5	0	0	0	—		5	0
SC Freiburg	2020–21	Bundesliga	19	0	1	0	—		20	0
SC Freiburg	2021–22	Bundesliga	29	2	4	0	—		33	2
SC Freiburg	2022–23	Bundesliga	22	2	4	0	7 (Note: Appearances in UEFA Europa League)	2	33	4
SC Freiburg	2023–24	Bundesliga	26	1	1	0	9	0	36	1
SC Freiburg	2024–25	Bundesliga	27	5	2	0	—		29	5
SC Freiburg	2025–26	Bundesliga	23	2	4	0	8	2	35	4
SC Freiburg	2026–27	Bundesliga	7	0	2	1	1 (Note: Appearances in UEFA Conference League)	0	10	1
SC Freiburg	Total		205	12	19	1	25	4	249	17
SC Freiburg II	2019–20	Regionalliga Südwest	2	1	—		—		2	1
SC Freiburg II	2020–21	Regionalliga Südwest	1	0	—		—		1	0
SC Freiburg II	2022–23	3. Liga	1	0	—		—		1	0
SC Freiburg II	Total		4	1	0	0	0	0	4	1
Career total			297	12	20	2	25	4	342	18

== Honours ==
SC Freiburg

- UEFA Europa League runner-up: 2025–26
