= 2023–24 SC Freiburg season =

SC Freiburg
2023–24 season
- President: Eberhard Fugmann
- Head coach: Christian Streich
- Stadium: Europa-Park Stadion
- Bundesliga: 10th
- DFB-Pokal: Second round
- UEFA Europa League: Round of 16
- Top goalscorer: League: Vincenzo Grifo (8); All: Michael Gregoritsch; Vincenzo Grifo (12 each)
- Average home league attendance: 34,196
Home colours	Away colours	Third colours

The 2023–24 season was SC Freiburg's 120th season in existence and eighth consecutive season in the Bundesliga. They also competed in the DFB-Pokal and the UEFA Europa League.

On 17 March 2024, Christian Streich announced that this would be his last season at the helm, ending an era that lasted twelve years.

== Players ==
As of 24 January 2024.

Note: Flags indicate national team as defined under FIFA eligibility rules; some limited exceptions apply. Players may hold more than one non-FIFA nationality.

No.	Pos.	Nation	Player
1	GK	GER	Noah Atubolu
3	DF	AUT	Philipp Lienhart
4	DF	GER	Kenneth Schmidt
5	DF	GER	Manuel Gulde
6	DF	HUN	Attila Szalai (on loan from TSG Hoffenheim)
7	MF	GER	Noah Weißhaupt
8	MF	GER	Maximilian Eggestein
9	FW	GER	Lucas Höler
11	MF	GHA	Daniel-Kofi Kyereh
14	MF	GER	Yannik Keitel
17	DF	GER	Lukas Kübler
20	FW	AUT	Junior Adamu
21	GK	GER	Florian Müller
22	MF	HUN	Roland Sallai

No.	Pos.	Nation	Player
23	MF	KOS	Florent Muslija
25	DF	FRA	Kiliann Sildillia
26	FW	GER	Maximilian Philipp (on loan from VfL Wolfsburg)
27	MF	GER	Nicolas Höfler
28	DF	GER	Matthias Ginter
30	DF	GER	Christian Günter (captain)
31	GK	GER	Benjamin Uphoff
32	MF	ITA	Vincenzo Grifo (vice-captain)
33	DF	FRA	Jordy Makengo
34	MF	GER	Merlin Röhl
37	DF	GER	Max Rosenfelder
38	FW	AUT	Michael Gregoritsch
42	MF	JPN	Ritsu Dōan

== Transfers ==
=== In ===
Pos.	Player	Transferred from	Fee	Date	Source
FW	(Austria) Junior Adamu	(Austria) Red Bull Salzburg	€6,000,000	1 July 2023	
GK	(Germany) Florian Müller	(Germany) VfB Stuttgart	€1,500,000	1 July 2023	
FW	(Germany) Maximilian Philipp	(Germany) VfL Wolfsburg	Loan	21 August 2023	
DF	(Hungary) Attila Szalai	(Germany) TSG Hoffenheim	Loan	21 January 2024	
FW	(Kosovo) Florent Muslija	(Germany) SC Paderborn	€1,000,000	24 January 2024	

=== Out ===
Pos.	Player	Transferred to	Fee	Date	Source
FW	(Switzerland) Nishan Burkart	(Switzerland) Winterthur	€300,000	1 July 2023	
MF	(Germany) Kimberly Ezekwem	(Germany) SC Paderborn	Loan	1 July 2023	
GK	(Netherlands) Mark Flekken	(England) Brentford	€13,100,000	1 July 2023	
FW	(Germany) Nils Petersen	Retired		1 July 2023	
MF	(Germany) Kevin Schade	(England) Brentford	€25,000,000	1 July 2023	
MF	(France) Jonathan Schmid		Free	1 July 2023	
MF	(Germany) Robert Wagner	(Germany) Greuther Fürth	Loan	1 July 2023	
MF	(South Korea) Jeong Woo-yeong	(Germany) VfB Stuttgart	€3,000,000	11 July 2023	
MF	(Germany) Lino Tempelmann	(Germany) Schalke 04	€400,000	14 July 2023	
DF	(Germany) Keven Schlotterbeck	(Germany) VfL Bochum	Loan	22 August 2023	

== Pre-season and friendlies ==
Win Draw Loss

15 July 2023 Friendly	SC Freiburg (Germany)	6–1	(Switzerland) Grasshopper	Freiburg
16:00 CEST (UTC+2)	Gulde (yellow card) 11'; Röhl 34'; Höfler 38'; Darvich (yellow card) 52', (goal) 90+2'; Knappe 53'; Breunig 66'; Lee Ji-han 69'; Rudlin (yellow card) 74'	Report	Ferreira 63'	Stadium: Europa-Park Stadion; Attendance: 9,500

22 July 2023 Friendly	SC Freiburg (Germany)	2–3	(Germany) VfL Wolfsburg	Zams, Austria
14:00 CEST (UTC+2)	Breunig 20'; Baur 65'	Report	Philipp 76'; Nmecha 78' (pen.); Tomás 86'	Stadium: Eurogast-Grissemann-Arena Zams; Attendance: 720; Referee: Olcay Bingol

29 July 2023 Friendly	SC Freiburg (Germany)	2–2	(France) Strasbourg	Freiburg
16:00 CEST (UTC+2)	Breunig 24'; Baur 41'	Report	Mothiba 10'; Diarra 21'	Stadium: Europa-Park Stadion

29 July 2023 Friendly	SC Freiburg (Germany)	2–2	(France) Strasbourg	Freiburg
18:00 CEST (UTC+2)	Nyamsi 21' (o.g.); Röhl 26'	Report	Perrin 4'; Nyamsi 80'	Stadium: Europa-Park Stadion

5 August 2023 Friendly	SC Freiburg (Germany)	2–0	(Italy) Empoli	Freiburg
15:30 CEST (UTC+2)	Sallai (penalty missed) 22'; Höler 34'; Gregoritsch 55'	Report		Stadium: Europa-Park Stadion; Attendance: 23,600

5 August 2023 Friendly	SC Freiburg (Germany)	1–2	(Italy) Empoli	Freiburg
17:30 CEST (UTC+2)	Gulde 27'	Report	Kaczmarski 30'; Piccoli 43'	Stadium: Europa-Park Stadion; Attendance: 23,600
Note: The match was played in one period of 45 minutes.

7 September 2023 Friendly	Karlsruher SC (Germany)	0–1	(Germany) SC Freiburg	Karlsruhe
14:00 CEST (UTC+2)	Wanitzek (yellow card) 30'	Report	Grifo 39'	Stadium: Grenke-Stadion; Attendance: 1,300; Referee: Daniel Schlager

12 October 2023 Friendly	SC Freiburg (Germany)	2–2	(Switzerland) Basel	Freiburg
14:00 CEST (UTC+2)	Ginter 62'; Avdullahu 90+2' (o.g.)	Report	Frei 9'; Gauto 19'; Barry (yellow card) 22'; Lang (yellow card) 24'; Xhaka (yellow card) 60'; Comas (yellow card) 76'; Senaya (yellow card) 90'	Stadium: Training pitch by the Europa-Park Stadion; Attendance: 0 Referee: Matthias Jöllenbeck (Germany)
Note: The match was played behind closed doors.

6 January 2024 Friendly	Eintracht Frankfurt (Germany)	2–5	(Germany) SC Freiburg	Frankfurt
13:00 CET (UTC+1)	Koch 24'; Buta 76'	Report	Sallai 29', 48'; Röhl 34'; Gregoritsch 55'; Grifo 64' (pen.)	Stadium: Deutsche Bank Park; Attendance: 0 Referee: Christian Ballweg
Note: The match was played behind closed doors.

21 March 2024 Friendly	SC Freiburg (Germany)	4–1	(Switzerland) St. Gallen	Freiburg
14:00 CET (UTC+1)	Breunig 3'; Adamu 39', 54' (pen.); Johansson 76'	Report	Witzig 5'	Stadium: Europa-Park Stadion; Attendance: 0
Note: The match will be played behind closed doors.

== Competitions ==
=== Overall record ===
Competition	First match	Last match	Starting round	Final position	Record							
Competition	First match	Last match	Starting round	Final position	Pld	W	D	L	GF	GA	GD	Win %
Bundesliga	19 August 2023	18 May 2024	Matchday 1	10th	34	11	9	14	45	58	−13	32.35
DFB-Pokal	13 August 2023	1 November 2023	First round	Second round	2	1	0	1	3	3	+0	50.00
UEFA Europa League	21 September 2023	14 March 2024	Group stage	Round of 16	10	6	1	3	21	14	+7	60.00
Total					46	18	10	18	69	75	−6	39.13

Source: Soccerway

=== Bundesliga ===
==== League table ====
Pos	Team	Pld	W	D	L	GF	GA	GD	Pts	Qualification or relegation
8	1. FC Heidenheim	34	10	12	12	50	55	−5	42	Qualification for the Conference League play-off round (Note: Since the 2023–24 DFB-Pokal winners, Bayer Leverkusen, qualified for the Champions League via league position, the spot reserved for the DFB-Pokal winners (Europa League league phase) was passed to the seventh-placed team, and the Conference League play-off round spot was passed to the eighth-placed team.)
9	Werder Bremen	34	11	9	14	48	54	−6	42	
10	SC Freiburg	34	11	9	14	45	58	−13	42	
11	FC Augsburg	34	10	9	15	50	60	−10	39	
12	VfL Wolfsburg	34	10	7	17	41	56	−15	37	

Source: DFB
Rules for classification: 1) Points; 2) Goal difference; 3) Goals scored; 4) Head-to-head results; 5) Head-to-head away goals scored; 6) Away goals scored; 7) Play-off.

==== Results summary ====
Overall								Home						Away					
Pld	W	D	L	GF	GA	GD	Pts	W	D	L	GF	GA	GD	W	D	L	GF	GA	GD
34	11	9	14	45	58	−13	42	5	7	5	28	30	−2	6	2	9	17	28	−11

Source: DFB

==== Results by round ====
Round	1	2	3	4	5	6	7	8	9	10	11	12	13	14	15	16	17	18	19	20	21	22	23	24	25	26	27	28	29	30	31	32	33	34
Ground	A	H	A	H	A	H	A	H	A	H	A	H	A	A	H	A	H	H	A	H	A	H	A	H	A	H	A	H	A	H	H	A	H	A
Result	W	W	L	L	D	W	L	W	L	D	L	D	W	W	W	L	D	W	L	L	L	D	L	D	W	L	W	L	W	D	L	D	D	L
Position	6	5	8	10	9	8	9	8	8	8	8	9	8	8	6	8	7	7	7	7	7	8	9	9	8	9	8	9	8	7	7	7	8	10

Source: DFB
A = Away; H = Home; W = Win; D = Draw; L = Loss

==== Matches ====
The league fixtures were unveiled on 30 June 2023.

19 August 2023 1	1899 Hoffenheim	1–2	SC Freiburg	Sinsheim
15:30 CEST (UTC+2)	Kabak 50'	Report	Lienhart (yellow card) 15'; Szalai 39' (o.g.); Sallai 45+3'	Stadium: PreZero-Arena; Attendance: 25,890; Referee: Sven Jablonski

26 August 2023 2	SC Freiburg	1–0	Werder Bremen	Freiburg
15:30 CEST (UTC+2)	Kübler (yellow card) 38'; Höfler (yellow card) 45'; Philipp 90+6'	Report	Schmid (yellow card) 6'; Friedl (yellow card) 55'	Stadium: Europa-Park Stadion; Attendance: 34,700; Referee: Benjamin Brand

2 September 2023 3	VfB Stuttgart	5–0	SC Freiburg	Stuttgart
15:30 CEST (UTC+2)	Führich 8', 62'; Guirassy 17', 19'; Itō (yellow card) 38'; Millot 75'	Report	Philipp (yellow card) 86'	Stadium: MHPArena; Attendance: 54,300; Referee: Felix Brych

16 September 2023 4	SC Freiburg	2–4	Borussia Dortmund	Freiburg
15:30 CEST (UTC+2)	Höler 45+2'; Höfler 45+6', (red card) 82'; Lienhart (yellow card) 86'; Eggestein (yellow card) 89'	Report	Hummels 11', 88'; Bensebaini (yellow card) 45+4'; Malen 60'; Wolf (yellow card) 68'; Can (yellow card) 78'; Reus 90+2'	Stadium: Europa-Park Stadion; Attendance: 34,700; Referee: Tobias Stieler

24 September 2023 5	Eintracht Frankfurt	0–0	SC Freiburg	Frankfurt
17:30 CEST (UTC+2)	Dina Ebimbe (yellow card) 45+2'; Pacho (yellow card) 52'; Koch (yellow card) 86'; Trapp (yellow card) 86'	Report	Ginter (yellow card) 33'; Eggestein (yellow card) 86'	Stadium: Deutsche Bank Park; Attendance: 55,800; Referee: Felix Zwayer

1 October 2023 6	SC Freiburg	2–0	FC Augsburg	Freiburg
17:30 CEST (UTC+2)	Grifo 5' (pen.); Röhl (yellow card) 50'; Lienhart 56'; Sildillia (yellow card) 75'	Report	Breithaupt (yellow card) 60'; Michel (yellow card) 84'	Stadium: Europa-Park Stadion; Attendance: 33,134; Referee: Harm Osmers

8 October 2023 7	Bayern Munich	3–0	SC Freiburg	Munich
17:30 CEST (UTC+2)	Coman 12', 85'; Mazraoui (yellow card) 17'; Sané 25'	Report		Stadium: Allianz Arena; Attendance: 75,000; Referee: Robert Schröder

21 October 2023 8	SC Freiburg	2–1	VfL Bochum	Freiburg
15:30 CEST (UTC+2)	Gulde (yellow card) 23'; Dōan 26'; Grifo (yellow card) 29', (goal) 45+2' (pen.); Eggestein (yellow card) 90+2'	Report	Paciência 15'; Antwi-Adjei (yellow card) 31'; Schlotterbeck (yellow card) 52'; Gamboa (yellow card) 63'; Riemann (yellow card) 65'	Stadium: Europa-Park Stadion; Attendance: 33,900; Referee: Tobias Reichel

29 October 2023 9	Bayer Leverkusen	2–1	SC Freiburg	Leverkusen
17:30 CET (UTC+1)	Wirtz 36'; Hofmann 60'	Report	Kübler (yellow card) 14'; Gulde 70'; Höler (yellow card) 90+4'	Stadium: BayArena; Attendance: 30,210; Referee: Daniel Siebert

4 November 2023 10	SC Freiburg	3–3	Borussia Mönchengladbach	Freiburg
15:30 CET (UTC+1)	Höler 7'; Lienhart (yellow card) 37'; Ginter (yellow card) 50'; Weißhaupt 70'; Grifo 90+6' (pen.)	Report	Pefok 25'; Pléa 29'; Weigl 39' (pen.), (yellow card) 90+1'; Netz (yellow card) 79'	Stadium: Europa-Park Stadion; Attendance: 34,700; Referee: Felix Brych

12 November 2023 11	RB Leipzig	3–1	SC Freiburg	Leipzig
19:30 CET (UTC+1)	Simons 6'; Haidara (yellow card) 62'; Openda (yellow card) 63', (goal) 79' (pen.); Baumgartner 80'	Report	Röhl 45+6'	Stadium: Red Bull Arena; Attendance: 41,117; Referee: Patrick Ittrich

25 November 2023 12	SC Freiburg	1–1	Darmstadt 98	Freiburg
15:30 CET (UTC+1)	Höler 35'; Weißhaupt (yellow card) 75'; Höfler (yellow card) 90+4'	Report	Honsak 18'	Stadium: Europa-Park Stadion; Attendance: 34,300; Referee: Sascha Stegemann

3 December 2023 13	Mainz 05	0–1	SC Freiburg	Mainz
15:30 CET (UTC+1)	Barreiro (yellow card) 29'	Report	Gregoritsch 70'; Sallai (yellow card) 87'	Stadium: Mewa Arena; Attendance: 30,300; Referee: Tobias Stieler

9 December 2023 14	VfL Wolfsburg	0–1	SC Freiburg	Wolfsburg
15:30 CET (UTC+1)	Arnold (yellow card) 85'	Report	Höfler (yellow card) 57'; Gregoritsch 74'; Sallai (yellow card) 77'; Röhl (yellow card) 85'; Höler (yellow card) 86'	Stadium: Volkswagen Arena; Attendance: 20,146; Referee: Marco Fritz

17 December 2023 15	SC Freiburg	2–0	1. FC Köln	Freiburg
15:30 CET (UTC+1)	Höfler (yellow card) 40'; Gregoritsch 72'; Sallai 90+5'	Report	Ljubičić (yellow card) 27'; Chabot (yellow card) 31' (yellow-red card) 62'; Kainz (yellow card) 57'	Stadium: Europa-Park Stadion; Attendance: 34,700; Referee: Harm Osmers

20 December 2023 16	1. FC Heidenheim	3–2	SC Freiburg	Heidenheim
20:30 CET (UTC+1)	Schöppner (yellow card) 33'; Föhrenbach (yellow card) 37'; Dinkçi 52'; Gimber (yellow card) 64'; Kleindienst 84'; Ginter 90+2' (o.g.)	Report	Gulde (yellow card) 5'; Höler 7', 64' (pen.); Sildillia (yellow card) 36'; Röhl (yellow card) 60'; Höfler (yellow card) 76'	Stadium: Voith-Arena; Attendance: 15,000; Referee: Benjamin Brand

13 January 2024 17	SC Freiburg	0–0	Union Berlin	Freiburg
15:30 CET (UTC+1)		Report	Aaronson (yellow card) 50'; Rönnow (yellow card) 90+5'	Stadium: Europa-Park Stadion; Attendance: 33,800; Referee: Christian Dingert

20 January 2024 18	SC Freiburg	3–2	1899 Hoffenheim	Freiburg
15:30 CET (UTC+1)	Höler 36'; Gulde (yellow card) 43' (yellow-red card) 82'; Grifo 55', (yellow card) 56'; Sallai 85'	Report	Kadeřábek (yellow card) 8'; Kabak (yellow card) 31'; Weghorst 57'; Beier 77'	Stadium: Europa-Park Stadion; Attendance: 33,600; Referee: Sascha Stegemann

27 January 2024 19	Werder Bremen	3–1	SC Freiburg	Bremen
15:30 CET (UTC+1)	Ducksch 9' (pen.); Stark (yellow card) 51'; Njinmah 53'; Lynen (yellow card) 89'; Malatini 90+3'	Report	Grifo 28' (pen.); Gregoritsch (yellow card) 90'	Stadium: Weserstadion; Attendance: 41,500; Referee: Robert Hartmann

3 February 2024 20	SC Freiburg	1–3	VfB Stuttgart	Freiburg
15:30 CET (UTC+1)	Röhl (red card) 18'; Ginter (yellow card) 41'; Eggestein (yellow card) 45+4'; Kübler 45+11', (yellow card) 90'; Philipp (yellow card) 90+9'	Report	Undav 3'; Führich 7'; Mittelstädt (yellow card) 72', (goal) 74'; Stiller (yellow card) 90+9'	Stadium: Europa-Park Stadion; Attendance: 34,700; Referee: Daniel Siebert

9 February 2024 21	Borussia Dortmund	3–0	SC Freiburg	Dortmund
20:30 CET (UTC+1)	Ryerson (yellow card) 14'; Malen 16', 45+7', (yellow card) 73'; Füllkrug 87'	Report		Stadium: Signal Iduna Park; Attendance: 81,365; Referee: Harm Osmers

18 February 2024 22	SC Freiburg	3–3	Eintracht Frankfurt	Freiburg
15:30 CET (UTC+1)	Dōan 30'; Grifo 45+5' (pen.); Gregoritsch 90'	Report	Marmoush 27'; Knauff 35', 72'	Stadium: Europa-Park Stadion; Attendance: 34,700; Referee: Tobias Stieler

25 February 2024 23	FC Augsburg	2–1	SC Freiburg	Augsburg
19:30 CET (UTC+1)	Vargas (yellow card) 23'; Uduokhai 72'; Bauer (yellow card) 79'; Engels 81'; Iago (yellow card) 89'	Report	Grifo 19' (pen.); Höfler (yellow card) 79'	Stadium: WWK Arena; Attendance: 28,894; Referee: Bastian Dankert

1 March 2024 24	SC Freiburg	2–2	Bayern Munich	Freiburg
20:30 CET (UTC+1)	Günter 12'; Höler 87', (yellow card) 90+4'	Report	Tel 35', (yellow card) 73'; Musiala 75'; Pavlović (yellow card) 79'	Stadium: Europa-Park Stadion; Attendance: 34,700; Referee: Sven Jablonski

10 March 2024 25	VfL Bochum	1–2	SC Freiburg	Bochum
15:30 CET (UTC+1)	Bernardo (yellow card) 33'; Mašović (yellow card) 45+4'; Ordets 62'; Losilla (yellow card) 82'	Report	Höfler (yellow card) 34'; Eggestein 36', (yellow card) 42'; Sallai (yellow card) 45+4'; Gregoritsch 53'; Gulde (yellow card) 59'; Höler (yellow card) 74'; Günter (yellow card) 83'; Kübler (yellow card) 90+2'	Stadium: Vonovia Ruhrstadion; Attendance: 25,594; Referee: Marco Fritz

17 March 2024 26	SC Freiburg	2–3	Bayer Leverkusen	Freiburg
15:30 CET (UTC+1)	Dōan 10'; Höfler (yellow card) 72'; Keitel 79'	Report	Wirtz 2'; Hložek 40'; Schick 53'	Stadium: Europa-Park Stadion; Attendance: 34,700; Referee: Harm Osmers

30 March 2024 27	Borussia Mönchengladbach	0–3	SC Freiburg	Mönchengladbach
15:30 CET (UTC+1)	Itakura (yellow card) 32'	Report	Gregoritsch 7'; Röhl 47'; Dōan 57'	Stadium: Borussia-Park; Attendance: 53,259; Referee: Christian Dingert

6 April 2024 28	SC Freiburg	1–4	RB Leipzig	Freiburg
15:30 CEST (UTC+2)	Höler (penalty missed) 41', (yellow card) 64'; Grifo 59'; Dōan (yellow card) 79'; Sallai (yellow card) 90+2'	Report	Haidara 2'; Openda 18', 44'; Šeško 54'; Schlager (yellow card) 65'; Raum (yellow card) 68'; Orbán (yellow card) 73'; Henrichs (yellow card) 75'	Stadium: Europa-Park Stadion; Attendance: 33,200; Referee: Daniel Siebert

14 April 2024 29	Darmstadt 98	0–1	SC Freiburg	Darmstadt
15:30 CEST (UTC+2)		Report	Sallai (yellow card) 4'; Dōan 36'	Stadium: Merck-Stadion am Böllenfalltor; Attendance: 17,810; Referee: Sascha Stegemann

21 April 2024 30	SC Freiburg	1–1	Mainz 05	Freiburg
19:30 CEST (UTC+2)	Gregoritsch 6'; Kübler (yellow card) 31'; Höfler (yellow card) 42'; Höler (yellow card) 70'	Report	Lee (yellow card) 35'; Burkardt 40'; Krauß (yellow card) 62'; Caci (yellow card) 71'; Van den Berg (yellow card) 85'	Stadium: Europa-Park Stadion; Attendance: 34,300; Referee: Marco Fritz

27 April 2024 31	SC Freiburg	1–2	VfL Wolfsburg	Freiburg
15:30 CEST (UTC+2)	Bornauw 42' (o.g.); Gregoritsch (yellow card) 55'; Sildillia (red card) 64'; Sallai (yellow card) 67', (penalty missed) 87'; Höfler (yellow card) 73'; Höler (yellow card) 90+2'	Report	Arnold (yellow card) 62', (goal) 82'; Lacroix 90'; Bornauw (yellow card) 90+3'	Stadium: Europa-Park Stadion; Attendance: 32,800; Referee: Frank Willenborg

4 May 2024 32	1. FC Köln	0–0	SC Freiburg	Cologne
18:30 CEST (UTC+2)	Finkgräfe (yellow card) 74'	Report	Kübler (yellow card) 51'	Stadium: RheinEnergieStadion; Attendance: 50,000; Referee: Sören Storks

11 May 2024 33	SC Freiburg	1–1	1. FC Heidenheim	Freiburg
15:30 CEST (UTC+2)	Dōan 29'; Grifo (yellow card) 64'	Report	Sessa (yellow card) 18', (goal) 38'	Stadium: Europa-Park Stadion; Attendance: 34,700; Referee: Daniel Siebert

18 May 2024 34	Union Berlin	2–1	SC Freiburg	Berlin
15:30 CEST (UTC+2)	Haberer (penalty missed) 38', (yellow card) 85', (goal) 90+2'; Knoche (yellow card) 52'; Trimmel (yellow card) 67'; Hollerbach 68'; Juranović (yellow card) 70'; Gosens (yellow card) 75'; Volland (penalty missed) 90+2', (yellow card) 90+8'; Laïdouni (yellow card) 90+7'	Report	Makengo (yellow card) 37'; Dōan (yellow card) 54', (goal) 85'; Kübler (yellow card) 75'; Eggestein (yellow card) 90+1'	Stadium: Stadion An der Alten Försterei; Attendance: 22,012; Referee: Christian Dingert

=== DFB-Pokal ===
13 August 2023 First round	SV Oberachern	0–2	SC Freiburg	Freiburg
15:30 CEST (UTC+2)	Fritz (yellow card) 45+1'; Zwick (yellow card) 65'; Gueddin (yellow card) 85'	Report	Günter 60'; Sallai 77'	Stadium: Dreisamstadion; Attendance: 24,500; Referee: Richard Hempel
Note: The match took place at the Dreisamstadion, instead of SV Oberachern's home stadium, the Sportplatz am Waldsee in Oberachern.

1 November 2023 Second round	SC Freiburg	1–3	SC Paderborn	Freiburg
18:00 CET (UTC+1)	Gulde (yellow card) 32'; Eggestein 69'	Report	Bilbija 4', 56', (yellow card) 82'; Muslija (yellow card) 18', (goal) 33'; Conteh (yellow card) 45+3'; Obermair (yellow card) 64'; Leipertz (yellow card) 73'; Boevink (yellow card) 77'; Nadj (yellow card) 90+7'	Stadium: Europa-Park Stadion; Attendance: 31,500; Referee: Christian Dingert

=== UEFA Europa League ===
==== Group stage ====
The draw for the group stage was held on 1 September 2023.

Pos	Team	Pld	W	D	L	GF	GA	GD	Pts	Qualification	WHU	FRE	OLY	TSC
1	(England) West Ham United	6	5	0	1	10	4	+6	15	Advance to round of 16	—	2–0	1–0	3–1
2	(Germany) SC Freiburg	6	4	0	2	17	7	+10	12	Advance to knockout round play-offs	1–2	—	5–0	5–0
3	(Greece) Olympiacos	6	2	1	3	11	14	−3	7	Transfer to Europa Conference League	2–1	2–3	—	5–2
4	(Serbia) TSC	6	0	1	5	6	19	−13	1		0–1	1–3	2–2	—

Source: UEFA
Rules for classification: Group stage tiebreakers

21 September 2023 1	Olympiacos (Greece)	2–3	(Germany) SC Freiburg	Piraeus, Greece
22:00 EEST (UTC+3)	El Kaabi (yellow card) 35', (goal) 40', 75'; Podence (yellow card) 86'	Report	Sallai 9', (yellow card) 68'; Höler (yellow card) 25'; Grifo 45+7' (pen.); Schmidt (yellow card) 52'; Philipp 86'	Stadium: Karaiskakis Stadium; Attendance: 30,056; Referee: Allard Lindhout (Netherlands)

5 October 2023 2	SC Freiburg (Germany)	1–2	(England) West Ham United	Freiburg
18:45 CEST (UTC+2)	Höfler (yellow card) 25'; Sallai 49'	Report	Paquetá 8'; Álvarez (yellow card) 48'; Aguerd 66'	Stadium: Europa-Park Stadion; Attendance: 34,100; Referee: Mohammed Al-Hakim (Sweden)

26 October 2023 3	TSC (Serbia)	1–3	(Germany) SC Freiburg	Bačka Topola, Serbia
22:00 CEST (UTC+2)	Petrović 13'; Cvetković (yellow card) 60'; Vlalukin (yellow card) 89'; Čalušić (yellow card) 90+2'	Report	Grifo 49' (pen.), 59', 73'; Lienhart (yellow card) 89'	Stadium: TSC Arena; Attendance: 3,400; Referee: Aliyar Aghayev (Azerbaijan)

9 November 2023 4	SC Freiburg (Germany)	5–0	(Serbia) TSC	Freiburg
21:00 CET (UTC+1)	Röhl 24'; Lienhart (yellow card) 39'; Eggestein 56'; Weißhaupt 69'; Adamu 80'; Dōan 90+2'	Report	Vlalukin (yellow card) 29'	Stadium: Europa-Park Stadion; Attendance: 31,700; Referee: Rohit Saggi (Norway)

30 November 2023 5	SC Freiburg (Germany)	5–0	(Greece) Olympiacos	Freiburg
18:45 CET (UTC+1)	Gregoritsch 3', 8', 36'; Sildillia 42'; Dōan 77'	Report	Hezze (yellow card) 35'; Retsos (yellow card) 57'; Iborra (yellow card) 83'	Stadium: Europa-Park Stadion; Attendance: 34,000; Referee: Irfan Peljto (Bosnia and Herzegovina)

14 December 2023 6	West Ham United (England)	2–0	(Germany) SC Freiburg	London, England
20:00 GMT (UTC+0)	Kudus 14'; Álvarez 42'	Report		Stadium: London Stadium; Attendance: 48,876; Referee: João Pinheiro (Portugal)

==== Knockout phase ====
===== Knockout round play-offs =====
The draw for the knockout round play-offs was held on 18 December 2023.

15 February 2024 First leg	Lens (France)	0–0	(Germany) SC Freiburg	Lens, France
21:00 CET (UTC+1)	Gradit (yellow card) 38'; Danso (yellow card) 42'; Saïd (yellow card) 81'	Report	Philipp (yellow card) 90'	Stadium: Stade Bollaert-Delelis; Attendance: 38,194; Referee: Bartosz Frankowski (Poland)

22 February 2024 Second leg	SC Freiburg (Germany)	3–2 (a.e.t.) (3–2 agg.)	(France) Lens	Freiburg
18:45 CET (UTC+1)	Höler (yellow card) 43'; Kübler (yellow card) 62'; Sallai 67', 90+2'; Gregoritsch 99'	Report	Costa 28'; Wahi 45+2'; Frankowski (yellow card) 65'; Sotoca (yellow card) 67'; Fulgini (yellow card) 95'; Medina (yellow card) 105+3'; Saïd (yellow card) 120+2'; Samba (yellow card) 120+2'	Stadium: Europa-Park Stadion; Attendance: 33,911; Referee: Rade Obrenovič (Slovenia)

===== Round of 16 =====
The draw for the round of 16 was held on 23 February 2024.

7 March 2024 First leg	SC Freiburg (Germany)	1–0	(England) West Ham United	Freiburg
21:00 CET (UTC+1)	Sildillia (yellow card) 40'; Sallai (yellow card) 50'; Gregoritsch 81'	Report	Paquetá (yellow card) 58'	Stadium: Europa-Park Stadion; Attendance: 34,700; Referee: Alejandro Hernández Hernández (Spain)

14 March 2024 Second leg	West Ham United (England)	5–0 (5–1 agg.)	(Germany) SC Freiburg	London, England
17:45 GMT (UTC+0)	Paquetá 9'; Bowen 32'; Cresswell 52', (yellow card) 66'; Álvarez (yellow card) 73'; Kudus 77', 85'	Report		Stadium: London Stadium; Attendance: 51,014; Referee: Marco Guida (Italy)

== Statistics ==
=== Appearances and goals ===
No.	Pos	Nat	Player	Total		Bundesliga		DFB-Pokal		Europa League	
No.	Pos	Nat	Player	Apps	Goals	Apps	Goals	Apps	Goals	Apps	Goals
Goalkeepers
1	GK	(Germany) GER	Noah Atubolu	33	0	24	0	1	0	8	0
21	GK	(Germany) GER	Florian Müller	1	0	0	0	1	0	0	0
31	GK	(Germany) GER	Benjamin Uphoff	0	0	0	0	0	0	0	0
Defenders
3	DF	(Austria) AUT	Philipp Lienhart	21	1	14	1	1+1	0	5	0
4	DF	(Germany) GER	Kenneth Schmidt	7	0	0+5	0	0+1	0	1	0
5	DF	(Germany) GER	Manuel Gulde	25	1	14+4	1	1	0	5+1	0
6	DF	(Hungary) HUN	Attila Szalai	2	0	0+2	0	0	0	0	0
17	DF	(Germany) GER	Lukas Kübler	26	1	15+3	1	0+1	0	4+3	0
25	DF	(France) FRA	Kiliann Sildillia	31	1	17+5	0	2	0	5+2	1
28	DF	(Germany) GER	Matthias Ginter	30	0	20+1	0	2	0	6+1	0
30	DF	(Germany) GER	Christian Günter	7	2	3+2	1	0+1	1	0+1	0
33	DF	(France) FRA	Jordy Makengo	17	0	9+3	0	0	0	4+1	0
37	DF	(Germany) GER	Max Rosenfelder	0	0	0	0	0	0	0	0
Midfielders
7	MF	(Germany) GER	Noah Weisshaupt	29	2	6+15	1	1	0	2+5	1
8	MF	(Germany) GER	Maximilian Eggestein	34	2	24	0	2	1	8	1
11	MF	(Ghana) GHA	Daniel-Kofi Kyereh	0	0	0	0	0	0	0	0
14	MF	(Germany) GER	Yannik Keitel	8	0	3+2	0	0+1	0	1+1	0
22	MF	(Hungary) HUN	Roland Sallai	27	8	15+4	3	1	1	6+1	4
23	MF	(Kosovo) KOS	Florent Muslija	4	0	0+3	0	0	0	0+1	0
26	MF	(Germany) GER	Maximilian Philipp	16	2	1+11	1	0	0	1+3	1
27	MF	(Germany) GER	Nicolas Höfler	29	1	17+2	1	1+1	0	8	0
32	MF	(Italy) ITA	Vincenzo Grifo	32	11	21+1	7	2	0	6+2	4
34	MF	(Germany) GER	Merlin Röhl	26	2	14+4	1	1+1	0	3+3	1
35	MF	(Germany) GER	Fabian Rüdlin	1	0	0+1	0	0	0	0	0
42	MF	(Japan) JPN	Ritsu Dōan	29	4	15+4	2	2	0	6+2	2
Forwards
9	FW	(Germany) GER	Lucas Höler	34	7	19+5	7	1+1	0	6+2	0
20	FW	(Austria) AUT	Junior Adamu	19	1	0+12	0	1	0	1+5	1
38	FW	(Austria) AUT	Michael Gregoritsch	30	8	11+11	4	2	0	2+4	4
44	FW	(Germany) GER	Maximilian Breunig	3	0	0+1	0	0+1	0	0+1	0
Players transferred out during the season
31	DF	(Germany) GER	Keven Schlotterbeck	0	0	0	0	0	0	0	0

Last updated: 1 March 2024
Source: Competitions

=== Goalscorers ===
As of 1 March 2024

Rank	Pos.	No.	Nat.	Player	Bundesliga	DFB-Pokal	Europa League	Total
1	MF	32	(Italy)	Vincenzo Grifo	7	0	4	11
2	MF	22	(Hungary)	Roland Sallai	3	1	4	8
2	FW	38	(Austria)	Michael Gregoritsch	4	0	4	8
4	FW	9	(Germany)	Lucas Höler	7	0	0	7
5	MF	42	(Japan)	Ritsu Dōan	2	0	2	4
6	MF	7	(Germany)	Noah Weißhaupt	1	0	1	2
6	MF	8	(Germany)	Maximilian Eggestein	0	1	1	2
6	MF	26	(Germany)	Maximilian Philipp	1	0	1	2
6	MF	34	(Germany)	Merlin Röhl	1	0	1	2
6	DF	30	(Germany)	Christian Günter	1	1	0	2
11	DF	3	(Austria)	Philipp Lienhart	1	0	0	1
11	DF	5	(Germany)	Manuel Gulde	1	0	0	1
11	FW	20	(Austria)	Junior Adamu	0	0	1	1
11	DF	25	(France)	Kiliann Sildillia	0	0	1	1
11	MF	27	(Germany)	Nicolas Höfler	1	0	0	1
11	DF	17	(Germany)	Lukas Kübler	1	0	0	1
Own goals					1	0	0	1
Totals					32	3	20	55
