= 2018–19 SC Freiburg season =

SC Freiburg
2018–19 season
- Chairman: Fritz Keller
- Manager: Christian Streich
- Stadium: Schwarzwald-Stadion
- Bundesliga: 13th
- DFB-Pokal: Second round
- Top goalscorer: League: Nils Petersen (10 goals); All: Nils Petersen (12 goals)
- Highest home attendance: 24,000
- Lowest home attendance: 23,500
- Average home league attendance: 23,894
- Biggest win: Freiburg 5–1 Augsburg; Freiburg 5–1 Nürnberg
- Biggest defeat: Mainz 5–0 Freiburg
Home colours	Away colours	Third colours
- All statistics correct as of 25 May 2019.

The 2018–19 SC Freiburg season was the 115th season in the football club's history and 3rd consecutive and 19th overall season in the top flight of German football, the Bundesliga, having been promoted from the 2. Bundesliga in 2016. In addition to the domestic league, SC Freiburg also participated in this season's edition of the domestic cup, the DFB-Pokal. This was the 64th season for Freiburg in the Schwarzwald-Stadion, located in Freiburg, Baden-Württemberg, Germany. The season covered a period from 1 July 2018 to 30 June 2019.

== Transfers ==
=== Transfers in ===
Date	Pos.	Player	From	Fee	Ref.
14 May 2018	GK	Mark Flekken	MSV Duisburg	Undisclosed	
23 May 2018	DF	Dominique Heintz	1. FC Köln	€3,000,000	
24 May 2018	FW	Luca Waldschmidt	Hamburger SV	€5,000,000	
5 June 2018	DF	Philipp Lienhart	Real Madrid	Undisclosed	
7 June 2018	MF	Jérôme Gondorf	Werder Bremen	€1,000,000	
23 July 2018	MF	Brandon Borrello	1. FC Kaiserslautern	Free transfer	
31 August 2018	FW	Roland Sallai	APOEL	Undisclosed	

=== Loans in ===
Date from	Pos.	Player	From	Date until	Ref.
6 January 2019	MF	Vincenzo Grifo	TSG 1899 Hoffenheim	End of season	

=== Transfers out ===
Date	Pos.	Player	To	Fee	Ref.
6 June 2018	MF	Mats Møller Dæhli	FC St. Pauli	Undisclosed	
16 June 2018	GK	Rafał Gikiewicz	Union Berlin	€200,000	
20 June 2018	MF	Aleksandar Ignjovski	1. FC Magdeburg	Undisclosed	
30 June 2018	MF	Julian Schuster		Retired	
30 June 2018	DF	Marc-Oliver Kempf	VfB Stuttgart	Free transfer	
30 June 2018	DF	Georg Niedermeier	Melbourne Victory	Free transfer	
30 June 2018	MF	Karim Guédé	SV Sandhausen	Free transfer	
30 June 2018	GK	Patric Klandt	1. FC Nürnberg	Free transfer	
2 July 2018	MF	Lucas Hufnagel	SpVgg Unterhaching	Undisclosed	
27 July 2018	MF	Jonas Meffert	Holstein Kiel	Undisclosed	
9 August 2018	DF	Çağlar Söyüncü	Leicester City	Undisclosed (reported £19,000,000)	
23 January 2019	MF	Caleb Stanko	FC Cincinnati	Undisclosed	

=== Loans out ===
Date from	Pos.	Player	To	Date until	Ref.
29 May 2018	FW	Fabian Schleusener	SV Sandhausen	End of season	
19 June 2018	DF	Jonas Föhrenbach	Jahn Regensburg	End of season	
21 June 2018	DF	Mohamed Dräger	SC Paderborn	End of 2019–20 season	
14 July 2018	MF	Vincent Sierro	FC St. Gallen	End of season	
29 January 2019	DF	Patrick Kammerbauer	Holstein Kiel	End of 2019–20 season	
7 February 2019	MF	Yoric Ravet	Grasshopper Zurich	End of season	

== Competitions ==
Win Draw Loss

=== Overview ===
Competition	First match	Last match	Starting round	Final position	Record							
Competition	First match	Last match	Starting round	Final position	Pld	W	D	L	GF	GA	GD	Win %
Bundesliga	25 August 2018	18 May 2019	Matchday 1		34	8	12	14	46	61	−15	23.53
DFB-Pokal	20 August 2018	31 October 2018	First round	Second round	2	0	1	1	3	4	−1	0.00
Total					36	8	13	15	49	65	−16	22.22

Last updated: 25 May 2019
Source: Competitions

=== Bundesliga ===
==== League table ====
Pos	Team	Pld	W	D	L	GF	GA	GD	Pts
11	Hertha BSC	34	11	10	13	49	57	−8	43
12	Mainz 05	34	12	7	15	46	57	−11	43
13	SC Freiburg	34	8	12	14	46	61	−15	36
14	Schalke 04	34	8	9	17	37	55	−18	33
15	FC Augsburg	34	8	8	18	51	71	−20	32

Source: DFB
Rules for classification: 1) Points; 2) Goal difference; 3) Goals scored; 4) Head-to-head results; 5) Head-to-head away goals scored; 6) Away goals scored; 7) Play-off

==== Results summary ====
Overall								Home						Away					
Pld	W	D	L	GF	GA	GD	Pts	W	D	L	GF	GA	GD	W	D	L	GF	GA	GD
34	8	12	14	46	61	−15	36	6	7	4	32	27	+5	2	5	10	14	34	−20

Last updated: 25 May 2019.
Source: Bundesliga

==== Results by round ====
Round	1	2	3	4	5	6	7	8	9	10	11	12	13	14	15	16	17	18	19	20	21	22	23	24	25	26	27	28	29	30	31	32	33	34
Ground	H	A	H	A	H	A	H	A	H	A	H	H	A	H	A	H	A	A	H	A	H	A	H	A	H	A	H	A	A	H	A	H	A	H
Result	L	L	D	W	W	L	D	D	W	D	L	D	L	W	L	D	W	L	L	D	D	D	W	L	W	D	D	L	L	L	L	D	L	W
Position	16	16	15	14	10	13	11	11	11	10	11	11	13	12	12	12	11	13	13	13	13	13	13	13	12	11	12	13	13	13	13	13	13	13

Updated to match(es) played on 25 May 2019. Source: DFB
A = Away; H = Home; W = Win; D = Draw; L = Loss

==== Matches ====
25 August 2018 1	SC Freiburg	0–2	Eintracht Frankfurt	Freiburg
15:30 CEST (UTC+2)		Report	Müller 10'; Haller 82'	Stadium: Schwarzwald-Stadion; Attendance: 24,000; Referee: Manuel Gräfe

1 September 2018 2	1899 Hoffenheim	3–1	SC Freiburg	Sinsheim
15:30 CEST (UTC+2)	Szalai 50', 63'; Kramarić 90+4'	Report	Heintz 36'	Stadium: Wirsol Rhein-Neckar-Arena; Attendance: 28,619; Referee: Robert Hartmann

16 September 2018 3	SC Freiburg	3–3	VfB Stuttgart	Freiburg
18:00 CEST (UTC+2)	Gondorf 1', 51'; Waldschmidt 81'	Report	Insúa 44'; Gómez 48', 56'	Stadium: Schwarzwald-Stadion; Attendance: 24,000; Referee: Deniz Aytekin

22 September 2018 4	VfL Wolfsburg	1–3	SC Freiburg	Wolfsburg
15:30 CEST (UTC+2)	Mehmedi 61'	Report	Sallai 7'; Petersen 21'; Frantz 50'	Stadium: Volkswagen Arena; Attendance: 23,011; Referee: Sascha Stegemann

25 September 2018 5	SC Freiburg	1–0	Schalke 04	Freiburg
20:30 CEST (UTC+2)	Niederlechner 52'	Report		Stadium: Schwarzwald-Stadion; Attendance: 24,000; Referee: Frank Willenborg

30 September 2018 6	FC Augsburg	4–1	SC Freiburg	Augsburg
18:00 CEST (UTC+2)	Caiuby 19'; Finnbogason 34', 68' (pen.), 83'	Report	Schmid 49' (o.g.)	Stadium: WWK Arena; Attendance: 26,488; Referee: Robert Kampka

7 October 2018 7	SC Freiburg	0–0	Bayer Leverkusen	Freiburg
13:30 CEST (UTC+2)		Report		Stadium: Schwarzwald-Stadion; Attendance: 23,800; Referee: Bastian Dankert

21 October 2018 8	Hertha BSC	1–1	SC Freiburg	Berlin
15:30 CEST (UTC+2)	Duda 7'	Report	Koch 36'	Stadium: Olympiastadion Berlin; Attendance: 53,716; Referee: Benjamin Cortus

26 October 2018 9	SC Freiburg	3–1	Borussia Mönchengladbach	Freiburg
20:30 CEST (UTC+2)	Petersen 1' (pen.); Waldschmidt 57'; Höler 90+4'	Report	Hazard 20' (pen.)	Stadium: Schwarzwald-Stadion; Attendance: 24,000; Referee: Robert Hartmann

3 November 2018 10	Bayern Munich	1–1	SC Freiburg	Munich
15:30 CET (UTC+1)	Gnabry 80'	Report	Höler 89'	Stadium: Allianz Arena; Attendance: 75,000; Referee: Felix Zwayer

10 November 2018 11	SC Freiburg	1–3	Mainz 05	Freiburg
15:30 CET (UTC+1)	Sallai 72'	Report	Gbamin 6'; Mateta 18'; Onisiwo 75'	Stadium: Schwarzwald-Stadion; Attendance: 24,000; Referee: Sascha Stegemann

25 November 2018 12	SC Freiburg	1–1	Werder Bremen	Freiburg
15:30 CET (UTC+1)	Waldschmidt 42' (pen.)	Report	Augustinsson 90+2'	Stadium: Schwarzwald-Stadion; Attendance: 24,000; Referee: Bastian Dankert

1 December 2018 13	Borussia Dortmund	2–0	SC Freiburg	Dortmund
15:30 CET (UTC+1)	Reus 40' (pen.); Alcácer 90+1'	Report		Stadium: Signal Iduna Park; Attendance: 81,365; Referee: Frank Willenborg

8 December 2018 14	SC Freiburg	3–0	RB Leipzig	Freiburg
15:30 CET (UTC+1)	Petersen 12'; Waldschmidt 45+1' (pen.); Frantz 52'	Report		Stadium: Schwarzwald-Stadion; Attendance: 23,800; Referee: Tobias Welz

15 December 2018 15	Fortuna Düsseldorf	2–0	SC Freiburg	Düsseldorf
15:30 CET (UTC+1)	Ayhan 55', 79'	Report		Stadium: Merkur Spiel-Arena; Attendance: 39,301; Referee: Harm Osmers

19 December 2018 16	SC Freiburg	1–1	Hannover 96	Freiburg
20:30 CET (UTC+1)	Waldschmidt 3' (pen.)	Report	Felipe 14'	Stadium: Schwarzwald-Stadion; Attendance: 23,500; Referee: Christian Dingert

22 December 2018 17	1. FC Nürnberg	0–1	SC Freiburg	Nuremberg
15:30 CET (UTC+1)		Report	Gulde 19'	Stadium: Max-Morlock-Stadion; Attendance: 36,190; Referee: Robert Kampka

19 January 2019 18	Eintracht Frankfurt	3–1	SC Freiburg	Frankfurt
15:30 CET (UTC+1)	Haller 36'; Rebić 40'; Jović 45'	Report	Petersen 69'	Stadium: Commerzbank-Arena; Attendance: 49,200; Referee: Sven Jablonski

26 January 2019 19	SC Freiburg	2–4	1899 Hoffenheim	Freiburg
15:30 CET (UTC+1)	Höler 42'; Niederlechner 77'	Report	Joelinton 19'; Kramarić 59' (pen.), 72'; Demirbay 85'	Stadium: Schwarzwald-Stadion; Attendance: 23,900; Referee: Bibiana Steinhaus

3 February 2019 20	VfB Stuttgart	2–2	SC Freiburg	Stuttgart
18:00 CET (UTC+1)	Insúa 75'; Didavi 83'	Report	Haberer 4'; Niederlechner 90+4'	Stadium: Mercedes-Benz Arena; Attendance: 51,009; Referee: Deniz Aytekin

9 February 2019 21	SC Freiburg	3–3	VfL Wolfsburg	Freiburg
15:30 CET (UTC+1)	Grifo 37'; Petersen 70'; Waldschmidt 87'	Report	Roussillon 11'; Weghorst 63' (pen.); Steffen 74'	Stadium: Schwarzwald-Stadion; Attendance: 23,600; Referee: Felix Brych

16 February 2019 22	Schalke 04	0–0	SC Freiburg	Gelsenkirchen
15:30 CET (UTC+1)		Report		Stadium: Veltins-Arena; Attendance: 58,271; Referee: Frank Willenborg

23 February 2019 23	SC Freiburg	5–1	FC Augsburg	Freiburg
15:30 CET (UTC+1)	Petersen 9', 43'; Grifo 30'; Waldschmidt 64'; Niederlechner 85'	Report	Khedira 52'	Stadium: Schwarzwald-Stadion; Attendance: 23,600; Referee: Tobias Welz

2 March 2019 24	Bayer Leverkusen	2–0	SC Freiburg	Leverkusen
15:30 CET (UTC+1)	Aránguiz 4'; Bailey 73'	Report		Stadium: BayArena; Attendance: 26,607; Referee: Guido Winkmann

9 March 2019 25	SC Freiburg	2–1	Hertha BSC	Freiburg
15:30 CET (UTC+1)	Petersen 27'; Ibišević 80' (o.g.)	Report	Ibišević 76'	Stadium: Schwarzwald-Stadion; Attendance: 24,000; Referee: Robert Schröder

15 March 2019 26	Borussia Mönchengladbach	1–1	SC Freiburg	Mönchengladbach
20:30 CET (UTC+1)	Pléa 16'	Report	Grifo 10'	Stadium: Borussia-Park; Attendance: 46,832; Referee: Robert Kampka

30 March 2019 27	SC Freiburg	1–1	Bayern Munich	Freiburg
15:30 CET (UTC+1)	Höler 3'	Report	Lewandowski 22'	Stadium: Schwarzwald-Stadion; Attendance: 24,000; Referee: Christian Dingert

5 April 2019 28	Mainz 05	5–0	SC Freiburg	Mainz
20:30 CEST (UTC+2)	Boëtius 20'; Mateta 25', 33', 77'; Onisiwo 73'	Report		Stadium: Opel Arena; Attendance: 27,305; Referee: Sven Jablonski

13 April 2019 29	Werder Bremen	2–1	SC Freiburg	Bremen
15:30 CEST (UTC+2)	Klaassen 76'; Gebre Selassie 84'	Report	Waldschmidt 90+3'	Stadium: Weser-Stadion; Attendance: 42,100; Referee: Bibiana Steinhaus

21 April 2019 30	SC Freiburg	0–4	Borussia Dortmund	Freiburg
15:30 CEST (UTC+2)		Report	Sancho 12'; Reus 54'; Götze 79'; Alcácer 87' (pen.)	Stadium: Schwarzwald-Stadion; Attendance: 24,000; Referee: Robert Hartmann

27 April 2019 31	RB Leipzig	2–1	SC Freiburg	Leipzig
15:30 CEST (UTC+2)	Werner 19'; Forsberg 78' (pen.)	Report	Grifo 66'	Stadium: Red Bull Arena; Attendance: 40,826; Referee: Robert Schröder

5 May 2019 32	SC Freiburg	1–1	Fortuna Düsseldorf	Freiburg
15:30 CEST (UTC+2)	Grifo 9' (pen.)	Report	Kownacki 31'	Stadium: Schwarzwald-Stadion; Attendance: 24,000; Referee: Tobias Welz

11 May 2019 33	Hannover 96	3–0	SC Freiburg	Hanover
15:30 CEST (UTC+2)	Anton 39'; Bebou 51'; Walace 81'	Report		Stadium: HDI-Arena; Attendance: 38,100; Referee: Robert Hartmann

18 May 2019 34	SC Freiburg	5–1	1. FC Nürnberg	Freiburg
15:30 CEST (UTC+2)	Marco Terazzino 7'; Waldschmidt 34'; Petersen 54', 56'; Grifo 61'	Report	Löwen 69'	Stadium: Schwarzwald-Stadion; Attendance: 24,000; Referee: Markus Schmidt

=== DFB-Pokal ===
20 August 2018 First round	Energie Cottbus	2–2 (a.e.t.) (3–5 p)	SC Freiburg	Cottbus
18:30 CEST (UTC+2)	Marcelo Freitas 47'; Viteritti 103'	Report	Frantz 90+1'; Petersen 99'	Stadium: Stadion der Freundschaft; Attendance: 15,245; Referee: Harm Osmers
	Penalties
	Stein (penalty scored); Marcelo Freitas (penalty scored); Schlüter (penalty scored); Kruse (penalty missed)		(penalty scored) Petersen; (penalty scored) Lienhart; (penalty scored) Höfler; (penalty scored) Frantz; (penalty scored) Heintz

31 October 2018 Second round	Holstein Kiel	2–1	SC Freiburg	Kiel
20:45 CET (UTC+1)	Serra 26'; Kinsombi 79'	Report	Petersen 1'	Stadium: Holstein-Stadion; Attendance: 9,361; Referee: Sören Storks

== Statistics ==
=== Appearances and goals ===
No.	Pos	Nat	Player	Total		Bundesliga		DFB-Pokal	
No.	Pos	Nat	Player	Apps	Goals	Apps	Goals	Apps	Goals
Goalkeepers
1	GK	(Germany) GER	Alexander Schwolow	35	0	33	0	2	0
26	GK	(Netherlands) NED	Mark Flekken	1	0	1	0	0	0
37	GK	(Germany) GER	Constantin Frommann	0	0	0	0	0	0
Defenders
3	DF	(Austria) AUT	Philipp Lienhart	16	0	7+7	0	1+1	0
5	DF	(Germany) GER	Manuel Gulde	22	1	20+1	1	1	0
15	DF	(Germany) GER	Pascal Stenzel	23	0	16+5	0	2	0
17	DF	(Germany) GER	Lukas Kübler	16	0	15+1	0	0	0
23	DF	(Germany) GER	Dominique Heintz	36	1	34	1	2	0
25	DF	(Germany) GER	Robin Koch	25	1	21+3	1	1	0
30	DF	(Germany) GER	Christian Günter	34	0	32	0	2	0
31	DF	(Germany) GER	Keven Schlotterbeck	9	0	8+1	0	0	0
36	DF	(Germany) GER	Chima Okoroji	2	0	1+1	0	0	0
49	DF	(Germany) GER	Nico Schlotterbeck	4	0	2+2	0	0	0
Midfielders
6	MF	(Albania) ALB	Amir Abrashi	10	0	9+1	0	0	0
8	MF	(Germany) GER	Mike Frantz	33	3	29+2	2	2	1
13	MF	(Germany) GER	Marco Terrazzino	14	1	7+6	1	0+1	0
19	MF	(Germany) GER	Janik Haberer	28	1	26+1	1	1	0
20	MF	(Germany) GER	Jérôme Gondorf	26	2	13+12	2	1	0
21	MF	(Australia) AUS	Brandon Borrello	0	0	0	0	0	0
22	MF	(Hungary) HUN	Roland Sallai	10	2	5+5	2	0	0
27	MF	(Germany) GER	Nicolas Höfler	20	0	18	0	2	0
32	MF	(Italy) ITA	Vincenzo Grifo	16	6	16	6	0	0
38	MF	(Germany) GER	Florian Kath	0	0	0	0	0	0
Forwards
7	FW	(Germany) GER	Florian Niederlechner	25	4	12+12	4	1	0
9	FW	(Germany) GER	Lucas Höler	28	4	11+15	4	0+2	0
11	FW	(Germany) GER	Luca Waldschmidt	32	9	16+14	9	2	0
18	FW	(Germany) GER	Nils Petersen	26	12	20+4	10	2	2
34	FW	(Germany) GER	Tim Kleindienst	6	0	2+2	0	0+2	0
39	FW	(Germany) GER	Christoph Daferner	1	0	0+1	0	0	0
Players transferred out during the season
14	MF	(Germany) GER	Patrick Kammerbauer	1	0	0+1	0	0	0
16	MF	(France) FRA	Yoric Ravet	5	0	0+4	0	0+1	0
33	MF	(United States) USA	Caleb Stanko	0	0	0	0	0	0

Last updated: 18 May 2019
Source: Competitions
