= Philipp Lienhart =

Austrian footballer (born 1996)

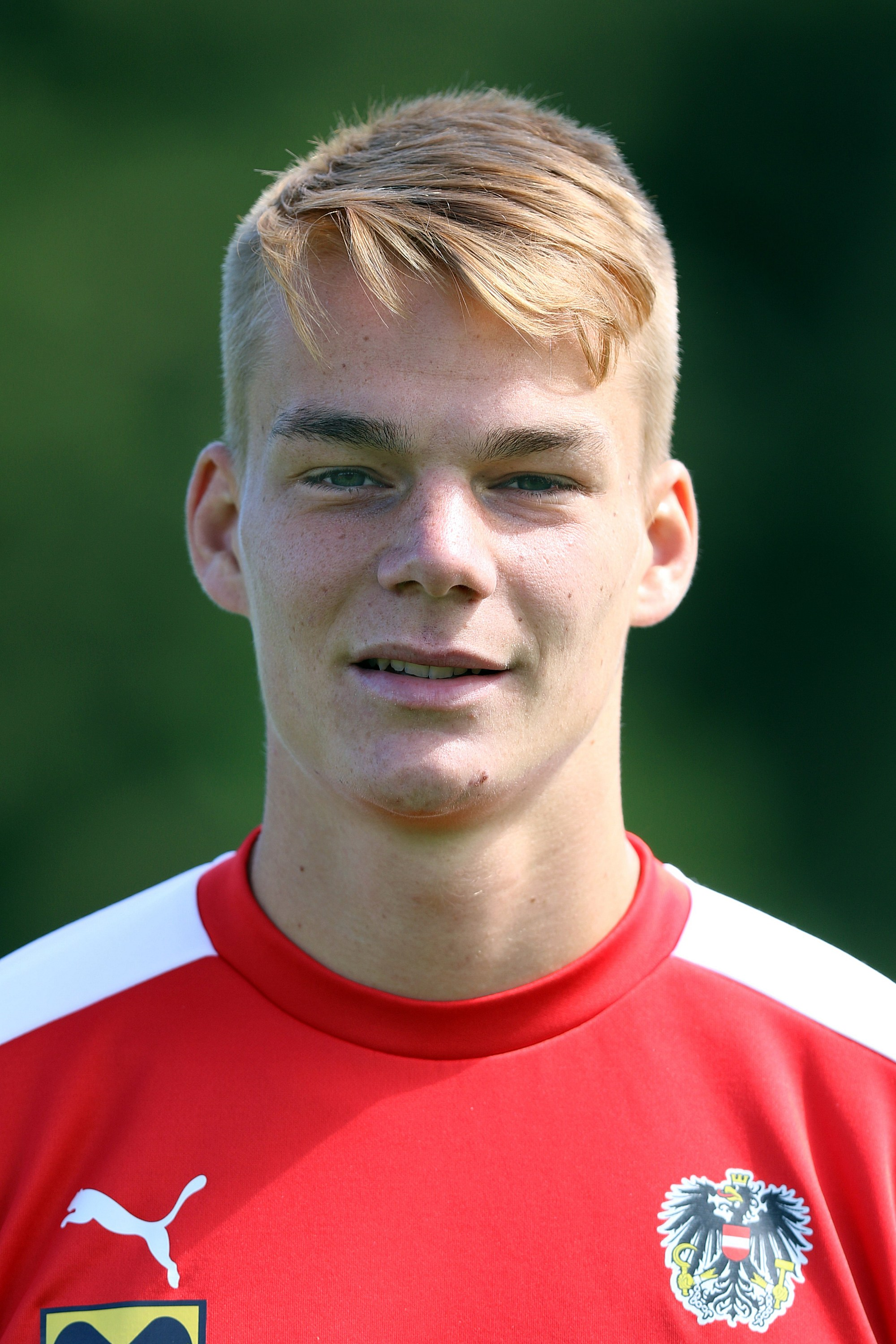
- Lienhart with Austria U21 in 2017

Personal information
- Date of birth: 11 July 1996 (age 30)
- Place of birth: Lilienfeld, Austria
- Height: 1.89 m (6 ft 2 in)
- Position: Centre-back

Team information
- Current team: SC Freiburg
- Number: 3

Youth career
- 2008–2015: Rapid Wien
- 2014–2015: → Real Madrid (loan)

Senior career*
Years	Team	Apps	(Gls)
2013–2014	Rapid Wien II	28	(1)
2014–2015	→ Real Madrid C (loan)	3	(0)
2015–2017	Real Madrid B	53	(1)
2015–2018	Real Madrid	0	(0)
2017–2018	→ SC Freiburg (loan)	11	(0)
2018–	SC Freiburg	206	(13)

International career^{‡}
2014	Austria U18	3	(0)
2014–2015	Austria U19	10	(0)
2015	Austria U20	4	(0)
2015–2019	Austria U21	30	(2)
2017–	Austria	46	(3)
- * Club domestic league appearances and goals as of 17:30, 31 October 2026 (UTC) ‡ National team caps and goals as of 23:00, 14 November 2026 (UTC)

Philipp Lienhart (born 11 July 1996) is an Austrian professional footballer who plays as a centre-back for Bundesliga club SC Freiburg and the Austria national team.

== Club career ==
=== Rapid Wien ===
Born in Lilienfeld, Lower Austria, Lienhart joined SK Rapid Wien's youth setup in 2008, aged 12. He made his senior debut for their reserve team on 16 April 2013, coming on as a late substitute in a 3–3 away draw against FC Admira Wacker Mödling Amateure for the Regionalliga championship.

=== Real Madrid ===
In August 2014, after being regularly used, Lienhart was loaned to Real Madrid. He competed with their youth team in the season's UEFA Youth League, playing seven matches and scoring in a 3–2 loss away to Liverpool in the group stage on 22 October, and also appeared with the C-side in Tercera División.

At the end of his first season, Lienhart was signed permanently for €800,000, and was subsequently promoted to the reserves by manager Zinedine Zidane. He made his debut for the B-team on 30 August 2015, playing the full 90 minutes of a 2–1 win at CF Rayo Majadahonda.

On 3 October 2015, Lienhart scored his first Castilla goal, equalising for a 1–1 draw at Sestao River Club by heading in Martin Ødegaard's corner kick. Two weeks later, amid an injury crisis, he was included in the main squad for the first time by manager Rafael Benítez, for a La Liga match against Levante UD; he was unused in the 3–0 win at the Santiago Bernabéu Stadium. He made his first team debut on 2 December 2015, replacing James Rodríguez in a 3–1 Copa del Rey away win against Cádiz CF.

=== SC Freiburg ===
On 5 July 2017, Lienhart was loaned to SC Freiburg for one year. In June 2018, the club announced they had signed him permanently from Real Madrid. The transfer fee was estimated at €2 million plus bonuses.

== International career ==
Lienhart represented Austria at the under-18, under-19, under-20 and under-21 levels.

Lienhart got his first call up to the senior Austria side after Sebastian Prödl withdrew through injury for 2018 FIFA World Cup qualifiers against Wales and Georgia in September 2017. He made his debut playing the full 90 minutes of the final match of the qualifying campaign, a 1–0 win against Moldova in October.

His first goal for Austria came during a UEFA Euro 2024 qualifying match against Estonia on 16 November 2023.

On 18 May 2026, Lienhart was selected in Ralf Rangnick’s 26-man squad for the 2026 FIFA World Cup, marking Austria’s first appearance in the tournament since 1998.

== Career statistics ==
=== Club ===
As of match played 31 October 2026

Appearances and goals by club, season and competition
Club	Season	League			National cup (Note: Includes Austrian Cup, Copa del Rey, DFB-Pokal)		Europe		Other		Total	
Club	Season	Division	Apps	Goals	Apps	Goals	Apps	Goals	Apps	Goals	Apps	Goals
Rapid Wien II	2012–13	Austrian Regionalliga East	2	0	—		—		—		2	0
Rapid Wien II	2013–14	Austrian Regionalliga East	22	0	—		—		—		22	0
Rapid Wien II	2014–15	Austrian Regionalliga East	4	1	—		—		—		4	1
Rapid Wien II	Total		28	1	0	0	0	0	0	0	28	1
Real Madrid C (loan)	2014–15	Tercera División	3	0	—		—		—		3	0
Real Madrid	2015–16	La Liga	0	0	1	0	0	0	0	0	1	0
Real Madrid B	2015–16	Segunda División B	27	1	—		—		3 (Note: Appearances in Segunda División B promotion play-offs)	0	30	1
Real Madrid B	2016–17	Segunda División B	26	0	—		—		—		26	0
Real Madrid B	Total		53	1	0	0	0	0	3	0	56	1
SC Freiburg (loan)	2017–18	Bundesliga	11	0	1	0	2 (Note: Appearances in UEFA Europa League)	0	—		14	0
SC Freiburg	2018–19	Bundesliga	14	0	2	0	—		—		16	0
SC Freiburg	2019–20	Bundesliga	22	0	2	0	—		—		24	0
SC Freiburg	2020–21	Bundesliga	34	4	2	0	—		—		36	4
SC Freiburg	2021–22	Bundesliga	32	5	6	0	—		—		38	5
SC Freiburg	2022–23	Bundesliga	29	1	4	1	6	0	—		39	2
SC Freiburg	2023–24	Bundesliga	15	1	2	0	5	0	—		22	1
SC Freiburg	2024–25	Bundesliga	32	1	3	0	—		—		35	1
SC Freiburg	2025–26	Bundesliga	20	1	3	0	11	1	—		34	2
SC Freiburg	2026–27	Bundesliga	8	0	2	0	3 (Note: Appearances in UEFA Conference League)	0	—		13	0
SC Freiburg	Total		206	13	26	1	25	1	0	0	257	15
Career total			301	15	28	1	27	1	3	0	359	17

=== International ===
As of match played 14 November 2026

Appearances and goals by national team and year
National team	Year	Apps	Goals
Austria	2017	1	0
Austria	2018	0	0
Austria	2019	0	0
Austria	2020	1	0
Austria	2021	7	0
Austria	2022	2	0
Austria	2023	8	1
Austria	2024	10	2
Austria	2025	9	0
Austria	2026	8	0
Total		46	3

Scores and results list Austria's goal tally first.

List of international goals scored by Philipp Lienhart
No.	Date	Venue	Opponent	Score	Result	Competition
1.	16 November 2023	Lilleküla Stadium, Tallinn, Estonia	Estonia	2–0	2–0	UEFA Euro 2024 qualifying
2.	10 October 2024	Raiffeisen Arena, Linz, Austria	Kazakhstan	2–0	4–0	2024–25 UEFA Nations League B
3.	13 October 2024	Raiffeisen Arena, Linz, Austria	Norway	3–1	5–1	2024–25 UEFA Nations League B

== Honours ==
SC Freiburg

- UEFA Europa League runner-up: 2025–26
