= Christian Günter =

German footballer (born 1993)

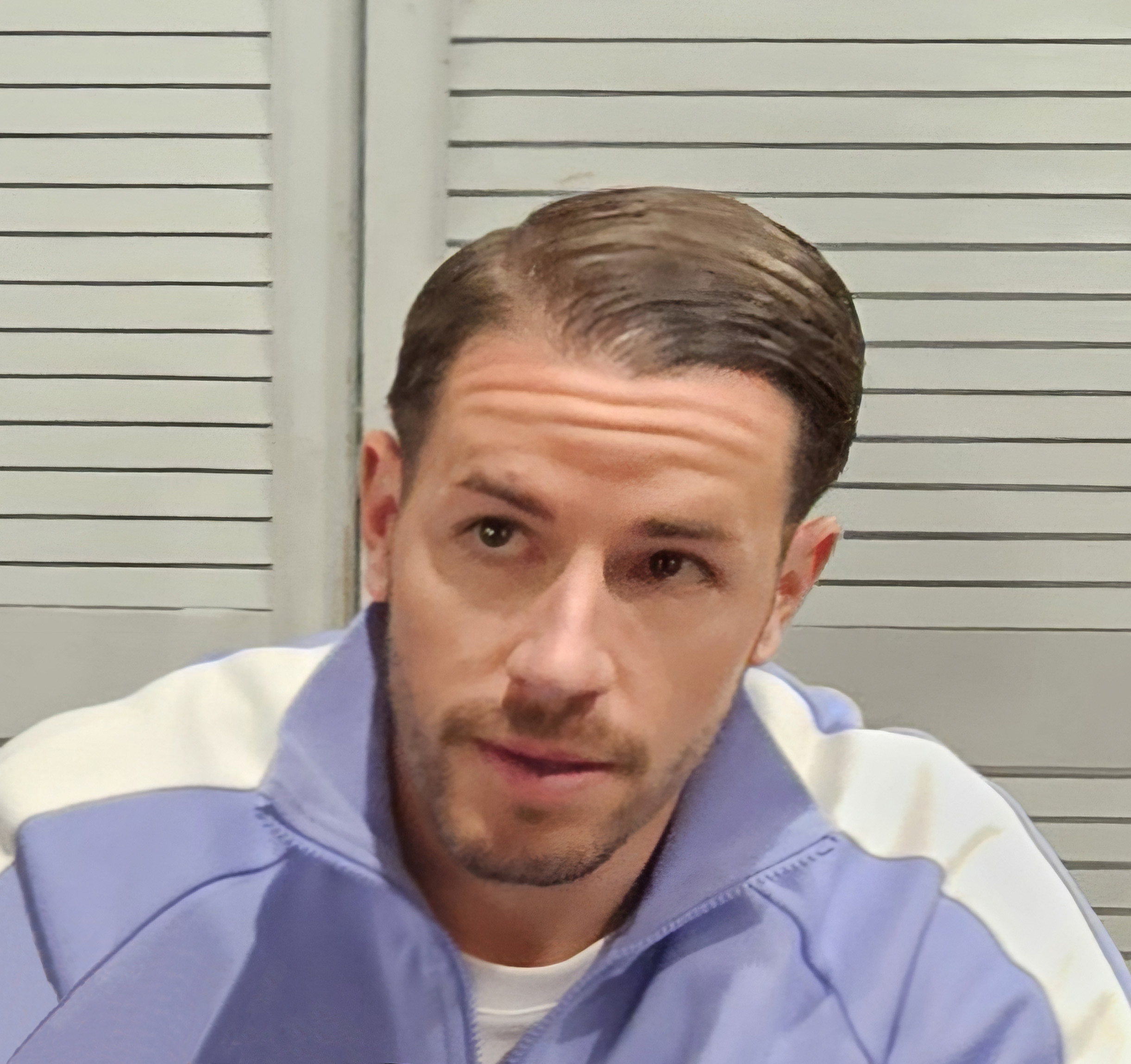
- Günter with SC Freiburg in 2025

Personal information
- Full name: Christian Günter
- Date of birth: 28 February 1993 (age 33)
- Place of birth: Villingen-Schwenningen, Germany
- Height: 1.84 m (6 ft 0 in)
- Position: Left-back

Team information
- Current team: SC Freiburg
- Number: 30

Youth career
- 1997–2006: FV Tennenbronn
- 2006–2012: SC Freiburg

Senior career*
Years	Team	Apps	(Gls)
2012–2014	SC Freiburg II	14	(0)
2012–	SC Freiburg	401	(13)

International career
2013–2014	Germany U20	5	(0)
2014–2015	Germany U21	9	(0)
2014–2023	Germany	8	(0)
- * Club domestic league appearances and goals as of 22:23, 3 May 2026 (UTC)

Christian Günter (born 28 February 1993) is a German professional footballer who plays as a left-back for and captains Bundesliga club SC Freiburg, where he has spent his entire career.

Having been a product of Freiburg's youth academy, Günter made his senior debut for the club in 2012, and has played for the club in nearly 400 league matches as of 2026, as well as being the current club captain for the side.

Internationally, Günter represented Germany at the UEFA Euro 2020, as well as the 2022 FIFA World Cup.

== Personal life ==
Günter originally comes from Tennenbronn, a district of the city of Schramberg. He was born in Villingen-Schwenningen, a neighbouring city. As a youth player for SC Freiburg, he commuted between Tennenbronn and Freiburg. He currently lives in Littenweiler, a district of Freiburg. Günter is married and has a daughter. After graduating from secondary school, he completed instruction and schooling as an industrial mechanic in St. Georgen.

== Club career ==
=== Youth career ===
At the age of four, Günter joined the football club FV Tennenbronn. As a 13-year-old, he was invited to trial training by SC Freiburg. From then on he went through the club's youth teams. In 2012, he won an important title as captain of the A-Juniors team, the DFB-Pokal der Junioren (youth DFB-Pokal).

=== Beginnings in professional football ===
Günter's professional career began in the 2012–13 season, when he was included in the SC Freiburg's professional squad; he became the new replacement for left-back Oliver Sorg. Günter was included in the professional team's squad for the first time on 17 November 2012. A few weeks later on 8 December, he finally made his debut for the first team in a 1–0 win against Greuther Fürth. As a substitute, he replaced Vegar Eggen Hedenstad in the 77th minute of the game. Günter played his second game again as a substitute in the DFB-Pokal on 18 December against Karlsruher SC. In total, he played eight competitive games in his first season.

The following season, SC Freiburg played in the Europa League. Günter made his first appearance of the new campaign in the DFB-Pokal against TSG Neustrelitz. In the following months, he was used more often by coach Christian Streich, as the two full-backs Hedenstad and Mensur Mujdža were temporarily unavailable. On 19 September 2013, Günter made his debut in European competition against Slovan Liberec. However, his team was eliminated after the group stage of the Europa League. In March 2014, Günter extended his contract at SC Freiburg early.

=== Regular player at SC Freiburg ===
On 8 November 2014, the 11th matchday of the 2014–15 league season, Günter scored his first goal in the Bundesliga, coming in the 22nd minute of a 2–0 win against Schalke 04. At the end of the season, in which Günter played in every Bundesliga match for the club, Freiburg were relegated to the second division. However, in the following season, The side would become 2. Bundesliga champions, earning immediate promotion back to the first league. Günter continued to be a regular player in the left-back position for Freiburg in the following season.

After only missing two matches in the following three Bundesliga seasons, Günter was elected team captain of the club in 2020. In addition, Günter also decided to wear a captain's armband in rainbow colours in order to set an example for more tolerance and against exclusion. In March 2021, he made a further contract extension at the club for an unknown term.

Günter became Freiburg's Bundesliga record player on matchday 2 of the 2021–22 season with his 237th appearance, breaking Andreas Zeyer's previous club record.

In July 2024, Günter was named as the club's captain ahead of the 2024–25 season. On 9 November 2025, he made his 441st appearance for the club in all competitions during a 2–1 victory over St. Pauli, becoming the club's all-time appearance record holder by surpassing Andreas Zeyer's previous mark.

== International career ==
Günter made his debut for the Germany under-20 national team on 12 October 2013, in a 4–0 win against the Netherlands. Günter was in the starting line-up before eventually being replaced by Tim Leibold of VfB Stuttgart.

In September 2014, Günter was nominated for the first time for two European Championship qualifiers by under-21 national coach Horst Hrubesch. He made his full 90-minute debut for the German U21 team on 5 September 2014, in a 2–0 win against Ireland. Günter was involved in three overall appearances as his team progressed to the main round.

Günter made his debut with the Germany national team on 13 May 2014 in a friendly against Poland, coming on as a substitute in the 81st minute for Oliver Sorg.

In July 2016, Günter represented Germany at the 2016 Summer Olympics in Rio de Janeiro. He and his team won the silver medal.

In May 2021, Günter was named to the squad for UEFA Euro 2020 by national coach Joachim Löw. He then made his second senior international appearance in a pre-tournament friendly against Denmark on 2 June 2021. Günter's side would go on to reach the round of 16 at Euro 2020, in which Germany lost against England. Despite expressing disappointment with the team's performance, he declared himself ready and willing to play for the national team again in the future.

In November 2022, Günter was named to the Germany squad for the 2022 FIFA World Cup by coach Hansi Flick.

== Career statistics ==
=== Club ===
As of match played 28 October 2026

Appearances and goals by club, season and competition
Club	Season	League			DFB-Pokal		Europe		Total	
Club	Season	Division	Apps	Goals	Apps	Goals	Apps	Goals	Apps	Goals
SC Freiburg II	2012–13	Regionalliga Südwest	10	0	—		—		10	0
SC Freiburg II	2013–14	Regionalliga Südwest	3	0	—		—		3	0
SC Freiburg II	2023–24	3. Liga	1	0	—		—		1	0
SC Freiburg II	Total		14	0	—		—		14	0
SC Freiburg	2012–13	Bundesliga	7	0	1	0	—		8	0
SC Freiburg	2013–14	Bundesliga	29	0	3	0	5 (Note: Appearances in UEFA Europa League)	0	37	0
SC Freiburg	2014–15	Bundesliga	34	1	3	0	—		37	1
SC Freiburg	2015–16	2. Bundesliga	31	0	2	0	—		33	0
SC Freiburg	2016–17	Bundesliga	31	0	2	0	—		33	0
SC Freiburg	2017–18	Bundesliga	34	1	3	0	2	0	39	1
SC Freiburg	2018–19	Bundesliga	32	0	2	0	—		34	0
SC Freiburg	2019–20	Bundesliga	34	2	2	0	—		36	2
SC Freiburg	2020–21	Bundesliga	34	3	2	0	—		36	3
SC Freiburg	2021–22	Bundesliga	34	2	6	0	—		40	2
SC Freiburg	2022–23	Bundesliga	33	1	5	0	8	0	46	1
SC Freiburg	2023–24	Bundesliga	15	1	1	1	3	0	19	2
SC Freiburg	2024–25	Bundesliga	29	2	3	0	0	0	32	2
SC Freiburg	2025–26	Bundesliga	24	0	5	0	9	0	38	0
SC Freiburg	2026–27	Bundesliga	0	0	2	0	2 (Note: Appearances in UEFA Conference League)	0	4	0
SC Freiburg	Total		401	13	42	1	29	0	472	14
Career total			415	13	42	1	29	0	486	14

=== International ===
As of match played 28 November 2023

Appearances and goals by national team and year
National team	Year	Apps	Goals
Germany	2014	1	0
Germany	2021	3	0
Germany	2022	3	0
Germany	2023	1	0
Total		8	0

== Honours ==
SC Freiburg

- 2. Bundesliga: 2015–16
- DFB-Pokal runner-up: 2021–22
- UEFA Europa League runner-up: 2025–26

Germany U23

- Olympic Silver Medal: 2016

Individual

- Bundesliga Team of the Season: 2019–20
- kicker Bundesliga Team of the Season: 2021–22
