= Jordy Makengo =

DR Congolese footballer (born 2001)

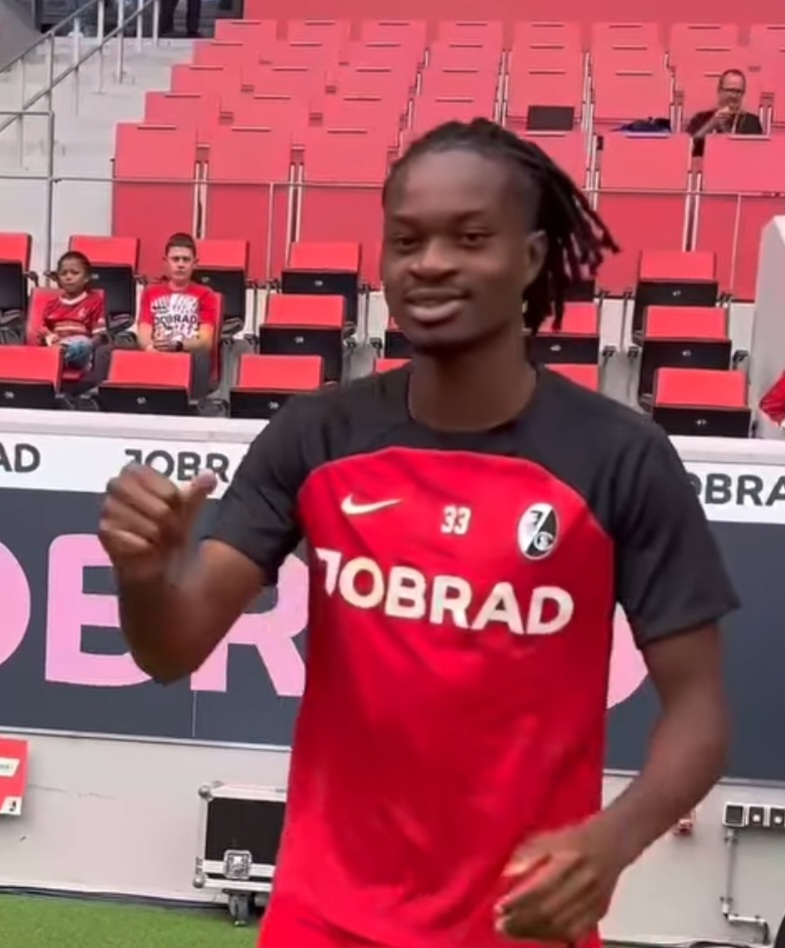
- Makengo with SC Freiburg in 2023

Personal information
- Full name: Jordy Makengo Basambundu
- Date of birth: 3 August 2001 (age 25)
- Place of birth: Saint-Denis, France
- Height: 1.91 m (6 ft 3 in)
- Positions: Left-back; centre-back

Team information
- Current team: SC Freiburg
- Number: 33

Youth career
- –2017: Gobelins
- 2017–2019: Auxerre

Senior career*
Years	Team	Apps	(Gls)
2019–2021	Auxerre B	4	(0)
2021–2024	SC Freiburg II	48	(0)
2023–	SC Freiburg	66	(0)

International career^{‡}
2026–	DR Congo	1	(0)
- * Club domestic league appearances and goals as of 17:30, 31 October 2026 (UTC) ‡ National team caps and goals as of 23:48, 2 October 2026 (UTC)

Jordy Makengo Basambundu (born 3 August 2001) is a professional footballer who plays as a left-back or centre-back for Bundesliga club SC Freiburg. Born in France, he represents the DR Congo national team.

== International career ==
Makengo was one of the players who were called up with the DR Congo national team by head coach Sébastien Desabre for the 2027 Africa Cup of Nations qualification matches against Equatorial Guinea (24 September 2026), Zimbabwe (28 September) and the 2 friendlies against Uganda (2 and 5 October). He made his international debut in their first friendly against Uganda, which they lost 2–0.

== Personal life ==
Born in France, Makengo is of DR Congolese descent.

== Career statistics ==
=== Club ===
As of match played 31 October 2026

Appearances and goals by club, season and competition
Club	Season	League			National cup (Note: Includes DFB-Pokal)		Continental		Other		Total	
Club	Season	Division	Apps	Goals	Apps	Goals	Apps	Goals	Apps	Goals	Apps	Goals
Auxerre B	2019–20	Championnat National 2	3	0	—		—		0	0	3	0
Auxerre B	2020–21	Championnat National 1	1	0	—		—		0	0	1	0
Auxerre B	Total		4	0	—		—		0	0	4	0
SC Freiburg II	2021–22	3. Liga	5	0	—		—		—		5	0
SC Freiburg II	2022–23	3. Liga	35	0	—		—		—		35	0
SC Freiburg II	2023–24	3. Liga	6	0	—		—		—		6	0
SC Freiburg II	2024–25	Regionalliga Südwest	1	0	—		—		—		1	0
SC Freiburg II	Total		47	0	—		—		—		47	0
SC Freiburg	2023–24	Bundesliga	20	0	0	0	5 (Note: Appearances in UEFA Europa League)	0	—		25	0
SC Freiburg	2024–25	Bundesliga	18	0	0	0	—		—		18	0
SC Freiburg	2025–26	Bundesliga	20	0	4	0	9	0	—		33	0
SC Freiburg	2026–27	Bundesliga	8	0	2	1	3 (Note: Appearances in UEFA Conference League)	0	—		13	1
SC Freiburg	Total		66	0	6	1	17	0	—		89	1
Career total			117	0	6	1	17	0	0	0	140	1

=== International ===
As of match played 2 October 2026

Appearances and goals by national team and year
National team	Year	Apps	Goals
DR Congo	2026	1	0
Total		1	0

== Honours ==
SC Freiburg

- UEFA Europa League runner-up: 2025–26
