= Yuito Suzuki =

Japanese footballer (born 2001)

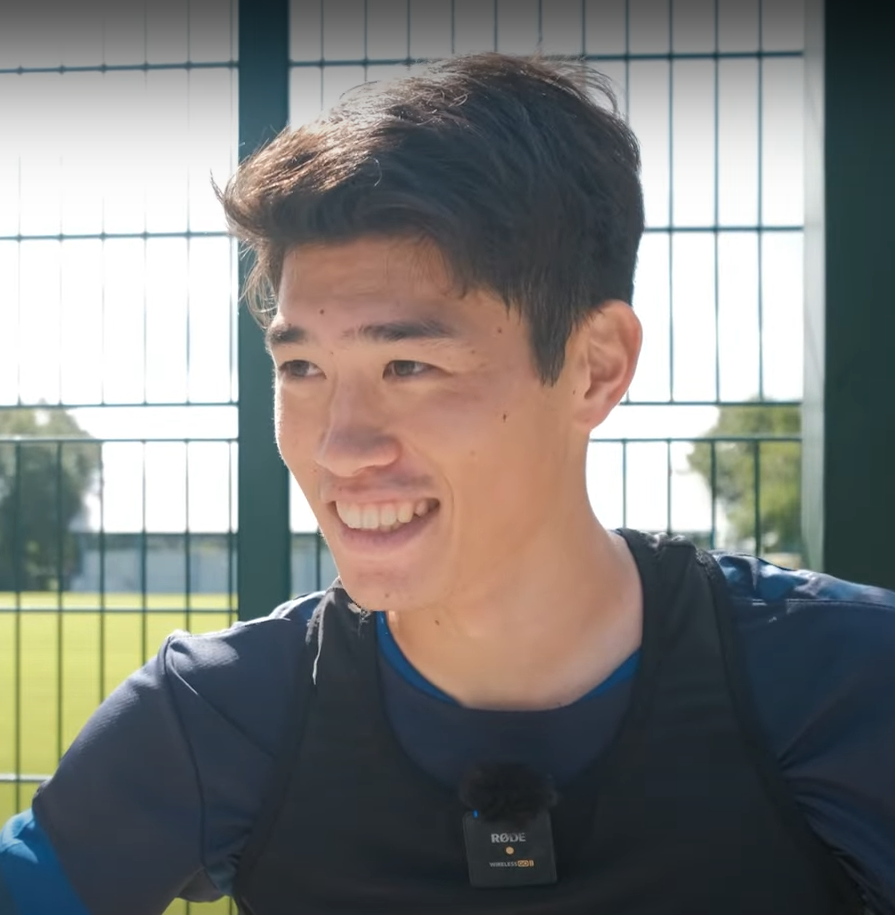
- Suzuki in 2023

Personal information
- Date of birth: 25 October 2001 (age 25)
- Place of birth: Hayama, Japan
- Height: 1.75 m (5 ft 9 in)
- Positions: Attacking midfielder; winger

Team information
- Current team: SC Freiburg
- Number: 14

Youth career
- –2013: Yokohama F. Marinos
- 2014–2016: Hayama Junior High School
- 2017–2019: Ichiritsu Funabashi High School

Senior career*
Years	Team	Apps	(Gls)
2020–2023	Shimizu S-Pulse	86	(6)
2023	→ Strasbourg (loan)	3	(1)
2023	→ Strasbourg II (loan)	1	(0)
2023–2025	Brøndby	58	(21)
2025–	SC Freiburg	32	(8)

International career^{‡}
2019	Japan U18	3	(1)
2022	Japan U20	1	(0)
2022–2023	Japan U21	6	(1)
2023	Japan U22	2	(0)
2021–2023	Japan U23	11	(5)
2024–	Japan	9	(0)
- * Club domestic league appearances and goals as of 17:31, 31 October 2026 (UTC) ‡ National team caps and goals as of 1 October 2026

Yuito Suzuki (鈴木 唯人, Suzuki Yuito; born 25 October 2001) is a Japanese professional footballer who plays as an attacking midfielder or a winger for Bundesliga club SC Freiburg and the Japan national team.

== Club career ==
=== Shimizu S-Pulse ===
After graduating from Ichiritsu Funabashi High School in 2019, Suzuki began his professional career with Shimizu S-Pulse, joining the club ahead of the 2020 season.

==== Loan to Strasbourg ====
On 28 January 2023, Suzuki moved abroad to France and officially joined Ligue 1 club RC Strasbourg Alsace on loan for 2022–23 season.

=== Brøndby ===
Suzuki moved to Danish Superliga club Brøndby on 12 August 2023, signing a four-year contract. He made his debut for the club on 28 August, replacing Mathias Kvistgaarden in the 67th minute of a 1–0 league victory away against Vejle Boldklub. On 27 September, he scored his first goal for the club in a 3–0 Danish Cup win over HIK. His first league goal followed four days later, on 1 October, contributing to a 3–0 away victory against Hvidovre. On 17 March 2024, Suzuki scored his first hat-trick, helping Brøndby to a 4–1 league win over Silkeborg. Throughout the season, he scored nine goals and eight assists for the club in the league, as well as two goals and two assists in the Danish Cup.

=== SC Freiburg ===
On 20 May 2025, it was announced that Suzuki would join German club SC Freiburg, with the transfer becoming effective on 1 July 2025. The terms of the agreement were not officially disclosed, though kicker reported the base transfer fee to be €8 million. In a statement announcing the signing, Freiburg board member Jochen Saier described Suzuki as "a player who can both score goals and set up his teammates," adding: "His pace, flexibility and technique will improve our overall attacking play as a team."

Suzuki made his competitive debut for Freiburg on 16 August 2025, coming on for Patrick Osterhage in the 62nd minute of a 2–0 DFB-Pokal first-round win away to Sportfreunde Lotte at the Stadion am Lotter Kreuz. He made his Bundesliga debut a week later, starting on the opening matchday of the 2025–26 season in a 3–1 home defeat to FC Augsburg at the Europa-Park Stadion, and was substituted after 70 minutes.

On 23 October 2025, Suzuki scored his first competitive goal for Freiburg, opening the scoring in a 2–0 home win over Utrecht in the UEFA Europa League group stage. His performance was praised by head coach Julian Schuster who highlighted Suzuki's way of fighting back after recently finding himself on the fringes of the team.

On 9 November 2025, Suzuki scored his first Bundesliga goal, his first-time finish setting Freiburg on their way to a 2–1 home win over FC St. Pauli. In a piece published on 14 November, kicker described him as a "marathon runner" with a steep learning curve, reporting that a recent omission from the Japan national team squad had helped drive his improvement as he added further goals and assists for Freiburg. On 22 November, he again opened the scoring, giving Freiburg a 1–0 lead away to Bayern Munich before the defending champions came back to win 6–2.

== International career ==
Suzuki made his debut for the Japan national team on 6 June 2024 in a 2026 FIFA World Cup qualifier against Myanmar at the Thuwunna Stadium. He substituted Ritsu Dōan at half-time as Japan won 5–0.

On 15 May 2026, Suzuki was selected in the 26-man squad for the 2026 FIFA World Cup.

== Career statistics ==
=== Club ===
As of match played 31 October 2026

Appearances and goals by club, season and competition
Club	Season	League			National cup (Note: Includes Emperor's Cup, Danish Cup, DFB-Pokal)		League cup (Note: Includes J.League Cup)		Other		Total	
Club	Season	Division	Apps	Goals	Apps	Goals	Apps	Goals	Apps	Goals	Apps	Goals
Shimizu S-Pulse	2020	J1 League	30	0	0	0	2	0	—		32	0
Shimizu S-Pulse	2021	J1 League	33	2	1	0	3	1	—		37	3
Shimizu S-Pulse	2022	J1 League	20	3	0	0	4	0	—		24	3
Shimizu S-Pulse	2023	J2 League	3	1	0	0	0	0	—		3	1
Shimizu S-Pulse	Total		86	6	1	0	9	1	—		96	7
Strasbourg II (loan)	2022–23	National 3	1	0	—		—		—		1	0
Strasbourg (loan)	2022–23	Ligue 1	3	1	0	0	—		—		3	1
Brøndby	2023–24	Danish Superliga	26	9	4	2	—		—		30	11
Brøndby	2024–25	Danish Superliga	32	12	5	0	—		3 (Note: Appearances in UEFA Conference League)	1	40	13
Brøndby	Total		58	21	9	2	—		3	1	70	24
SC Freiburg	2025–26	Bundesliga	25	4	5	1	—		11 (Note: Appearances in UEFA Europa League)	4	41	9
SC Freiburg	2026–27	Bundesliga	7	4	2	0	—		4 (Note: Appearances in UEFA Conference League)	0	13	4
SC Freiburg	Total		32	8	7	1	—		15	4	54	13
Career total			180	36	17	3	9	1	18	4	224	46

=== International ===
As of match played 1 October 2026

Appearances and goals by national team and year
National team	Year	Apps	Goals
Japan	2024	1	0
Japan	2025	3	0
Japan	2026	5	0
Total		9	0

== Honours ==
Individual

- Danish Superliga Fans' Team of the Season: 2023–24
