= Lucas Höler =

German footballer

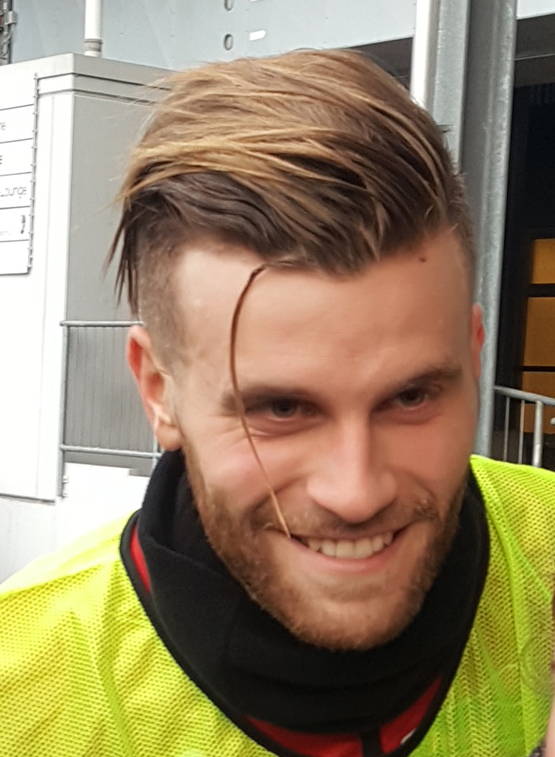
- Höler at SC Freiburg training in 2019

Personal information
- Date of birth: 10 July 1994 (age 32)
- Place of birth: Achim, Germany
- Height: 1.84 m (6 ft 0 in)
- Positions: Forward; attacking midfielder

Team information
- Current team: SC Freiburg
- Number: 9

Youth career
- 1998–2008: FC Hansa Schwanewede
- 2008–2011: VSK Osterholz-Scharmbeck
- 2011–2013: Blumenthaler SV

Senior career*
Years	Team	Apps	(Gls)
2013–2014	VfB Oldenburg	34	(9)
2014–2016	Mainz 05 II	63	(21)
2016–2018	SV Sandhausen	48	(13)
2018–	SC Freiburg	271	(45)
2022	SC Freiburg II	1	(0)
- * Club domestic league appearances and goals as of 31 October 2026

Lucas Höler (born 10 July 1994) is a German professional footballer who plays as a forward or attacking midfielder for Bundesliga club SC Freiburg.

== Career ==
In May 2016, SV Sandhausen announced the signing of Höler for the 2016–17 season, on a two-year contract with the option of a third year.

In December 2017, it was announced that Höler would join SC Freiburg for the second half of the 2017–18 season. He previously had half a season left on his Sandhausen contract.

On 4 April 2023, Höler scored a penalty in the stoppage time to be the winning goal for Freiburg in a 2–1 victory over Bayern Munich in the DFB Cup quarter-finals, to be his club's first ever away win against the latter in all competitions.

== Career statistics ==
As of match played 31 October 2026

Appearances and goals by club, season and competition
Club	Season	League			DFB-Pokal		Europe		Total	
Club	Season	Division	Apps	Goals	Apps	Goals	Apps	Goals	Apps	Goals
VfB Oldenburg	2013–14	Regionalliga Nord	34	9	—		—		34	9
Mainz 05 II	2014–15	3. Liga	26	10	—		—		26	10
Mainz 05 II	2015–16	3. Liga	37	11	—		—		37	11
Mainz 05 II	Total		63	21	—		—		63	21
SV Sandhausen	2016–17	2. Bundesliga	32	6	2	0	—		34	6
SV Sandhausen	2017–18	2. Bundesliga	16	7	1	1	—		17	8
SV Sandhausen	Total		48	13	3	1	0	0	51	14
SC Freiburg	2017–18	Bundesliga	14	1	0	0	—		14	1
SC Freiburg	2018–19	Bundesliga	26	4	2	0	—		28	4
SC Freiburg	2019–20	Bundesliga	34	8	2	0	—		36	8
SC Freiburg	2020–21	Bundesliga	33	4	2	0	—		35	4
SC Freiburg	2021–22	Bundesliga	34	7	6	0	—		40	7
SC Freiburg	2022–23	Bundesliga	26	5	3	1	3 (Note: Appearances in UEFA Europa League)	0	32	6
SC Freiburg	2023–24	Bundesliga	33	7	2	0	10	0	45	7
SC Freiburg	2024–25	Bundesliga	31	6	3	1	—		34	7
SC Freiburg	2025–26	Bundesliga	33	3	4	2	11	0	48	5
SC Freiburg	2026–27	Bundesliga	7	0	1	1	3 (Note: Appearances in UEFA Conference League)	0	11	1
SC Freiburg	Total		271	45	25	5	27	0	323	50
SC Freiburg II	2022–23	3. Liga	1	0	—		—		1	0
Career total			417	88	28	6	27	0	472	94

== Honours ==
SC Freiburg

- UEFA Europa League runner-up: 2025–26
