= 2017–18 SC Freiburg season =

SC Freiburg
2017–18 season
- Chairman: Fritz Keller
- Manager: Christian Streich
- Stadium: Schwarzwald-Stadion
- Bundesliga: 15th
- DFB-Pokal: Round of 16
- Europa League: Third qualifying round
- Top goalscorer: League: Nils Petersen (15 goals); All: Nils Petersen (19 goals)
- Highest home attendance: 24,000
- Lowest home attendance: 14,000
- Average home league attendance: 23,894
- Biggest win: Freiburg 3–1 Dresden; Freiburg 2–0 Augsburg
- Biggest defeat: Bayern 5–0 Freiburg
Home colours	Away colours	Third colours
- All statistics correct as of 21 May 2018.

The 2017–18 SC Freiburg season is the 114th season in the football club's history and 2nd consecutive and 18th overall season in the top flight of German football, the Bundesliga, having been promoted from the 2. Bundesliga in 2016. In addition to the domestic league, SC Freiburg also are participating in this season's edition of the domestic cup, the DFB-Pokal, and the second-tier continental cup, the UEFA Europa League. This is the 63rd season for Freiburg in the Schwarzwald-Stadion, located in Freiburg, Baden-Württemberg, Germany. The season covers a period from 1 July 2017 to 30 June 2018.

== Players ==
=== Squad information ===
As of 30 January 2018

Note: Flags indicate national team as defined under FIFA eligibility rules; some limited exceptions apply. Players may hold more than one non-FIFA nationality.

No.	Pos.	Nation	Player
1	GK	GER	Alexander Schwolow
2	DF	SRB	Aleksandar Ignjovski
3	DF	AUT	Philipp Lienhart (on loan from Real Madrid)
4	DF	TUR	Çağlar Söyüncü
5	DF	GER	Manuel Gulde
6	MF	ALB	Amir Abrashi
7	FW	GER	Florian Niederlechner
8	MF	GER	Mike Frantz
9	FW	GER	Lucas Höler
13	MF	GER	Marco Terrazzino
14	DF	GER	Patrick Kammerbauer
15	DF	GER	Pascal Stenzel
16	MF	FRA	Yoric Ravet
17	DF	GER	Lukas Kübler
18	FW	GER	Nils Petersen
19	MF	GER	Janik Haberer

No.	Pos.	Nation	Player
20	DF	GER	Marc-Oliver Kempf
21	GK	GER	Patric Klandt
22	MF	SUI	Vincent Sierro
23	MF	GER	Julian Schuster (captain)
24	DF	GER	Georg Niedermeier
25	DF	GER	Robin Koch
26	DF	FRA	Gaëtan Bussmann (on loan from Mainz 05)
27	MF	GER	Nicolas Höfler
28	MF	GER	Jonas Meffert
30	DF	GER	Christian Günter
31	MF	SVK	Karim Guédé
32	MF	POL	Bartosz Kapustka (on loan from Leicester City)
33	MF	USA	Caleb Stanko
34	FW	GER	Tim Kleindienst
38	DF	GER	Florian Kath
44	GK	POL	Rafał Gikiewicz

== Competitions ==
Win Draw Loss

=== Overview ===
Competition	First match	Last match	Starting round	Final position	Record							
Competition	First match	Last match	Starting round	Final position	Pld	W	D	L	GF	GA	GD	Win %
Bundesliga	20 August 2017	12 May 2018	Matchday 1		34	8	12	14	32	56	−24	23.53
DFB-Pokal	12 August 2017	20 December 2017	First round	Round of 16	3	2	0	1	7	5	+2	66.67
Europa League	27 July 2017	3 August 2017	Third qualifying round	Third qualifying round	2	1	0	1	1	2	−1	50.00
Total					39	11	12	16	40	63	−23	28.21

Last updated: 21 May 2018
Source: Competitions

=== Bundesliga ===
==== League table ====
Pos	Team	Pld	W	D	L	GF	GA	GD	Pts	Qualification or relegation
13	Hannover 96	34	10	9	15	44	54	−10	39	
14	Mainz 05	34	9	9	16	38	52	−14	36	
15	SC Freiburg	34	8	12	14	32	56	−24	36	
16	VfL Wolfsburg (O)	34	6	15	13	36	48	−12	33	Qualification for the relegation play-offs
17	Hamburger SV (R)	34	8	7	19	29	53	−24	31	Relegation to 2. Bundesliga

Source: DFB
Rules for classification: 1) Points; 2) Goal difference; 3) Goals scored; 4) Head-to-head results; 5) Head-to-head away goals scored; 6) Away goals scored; 7) Play-off.
(O) Play-off winners; (R) Relegated

==== Results summary ====
Overall								Home						Away					
Pld	W	D	L	GF	GA	GD	Pts	W	D	L	GF	GA	GD	W	D	L	GF	GA	GD
34	8	12	14	32	56	−24	36	7	6	4	17	17	0	1	6	10	15	39	−24

Last updated: 21 May 2018.
Source: Bundesliga

==== Results by round ====
Round	1	2	3	4	5	6	7	8	9	10	11	12	13	14	15	16	17	18	19	20	21	22	23	24	25	26	27	28	29	30	31	32	33	34
Ground	H	A	H	A	H	A	H	A	H	A	H	A	H	H	A	H	A	A	H	A	H	A	H	A	H	A	H	A	H	A	A	H	A	H
Result	D	L	D	L	D	D	W	L	D	L	L	L	W	D	W	W	D	D	W	D	D	L	W	D	L	D	L	L	L	L	L	W	L	W
Position	9	15	15	16	16	16	15	16	15	15	16	17	16	16	16	13	13	14	12	12	12	12	12	13	13	14	14	14	14	16	16	15	15	15

Updated to match(es) played on 21 May 2018. Source: Bundesliga
A = Away; H = Home; W = Win; D = Draw; L = Loss

==== Matches ====
20 August 2017 1	SC Freiburg	0–0	Eintracht Frankfurt	Freiburg
15:30 CEST (UTC+2)		Report		Stadium: Schwarzwald-Stadion; Attendance: 24,000; Referee: Manuel Gräfe

27 August 2017 2	RB Leipzig	4–1	SC Freiburg	Leipzig
15:30 CEST (UTC+2)	Werner 48', 71'; Orbán 55'; Bruma 80'	Report	Niederlechner 23'	Stadium: Red Bull Arena; Attendance: 39,265; Referee: Christian Dingert

9 September 2017 3	SC Freiburg	0–0	Borussia Dortmund	Freiburg
15:30 CEST (UTC+2)		Report		Stadium: Schwarzwald-Stadion; Attendance: 24,000; Referee: Benjamin Cortus

17 September 2017 4	Bayer Leverkusen	4–0	SC Freiburg	Leverkusen
15:30 CEST (UTC+2)	Volland 21', 34'; Aránguiz 29'; Brandt 86'	Report		Stadium: BayArena; Attendance: 26,232; Referee: Sven Jablonski

20 September 2017 5	SC Freiburg	1–1	Hannover 96	Freiburg
20:30 CEST (UTC+2)	Petersen 83'	Report	Harnik 65'	Stadium: Schwarzwald-Stadion; Attendance: 22,900; Referee: Tobias Stieler

23 September 2017 6	Werder Bremen	0–0	SC Freiburg	Bremen
15:30 CEST (UTC+2)		Report		Stadium: Weser-Stadion; Attendance: 41,000; Referee: Robert Hartmann

1 October 2017 7	SC Freiburg	3–2	1899 Hoffenheim	Freiburg
13:30 CEST (UTC+2)	Niederlechner 15'; Söyüncü 18'; Stenzel 87'	Report	Hack 14'; Schuster 90+1' (o.g.)	Stadium: Schwarzwald-Stadion; Attendance: 24,000; Referee: Daniel Siebert

14 October 2017 8	Bayern Munich	5–0	SC Freiburg	Munich
15:30 CEST (UTC+2)	Schuster 8' (o.g.); Coman 42'; Thiago 63'; Lewandowski 75'; Kimmich 90+3'	Report		Stadium: Allianz Arena; Attendance: 75,000; Referee: Frank Willenborg

22 October 2017 9	SC Freiburg	1–1	Hertha BSC	Freiburg
15:30 CEST (UTC+2)	Haberer 52' (pen.)	Report	Kalou 81' (pen.)	Stadium: Schwarzwald-Stadion; Attendance: 23,800; Referee: Guido Winkmann

29 October 2017 10	VfB Stuttgart	3–0	SC Freiburg	Stuttgart
18:00 CET (UTC+1)	Ginczek 38'; Pavard 45+4'; Terodde 82'	Report		Stadium: Mercedes-Benz Arena; Attendance: 58,872; Referee: Tobias Stieler

4 November 2017 11	SC Freiburg	0–1	Schalke 04	Freiburg
15:30 CET (UTC+1)		Report	Caligiuri 62'	Stadium: Schwarzwald-Stadion; Attendance: 24,000; Referee: Felix Brych

18 November 2017 12	VfL Wolfsburg	3–1	SC Freiburg	Wolfsburg
15:30 CET (UTC+1)	Gerhardt 3'; Mallı 29', 70'	Report	Kapustka 68'	Stadium: Volkswagen Arena; Attendance: 23,744; Referee: Manuel Gräfe

25 November 2017 13	SC Freiburg	2–1	Mainz 05	Freiburg
15:30 CET (UTC+1)	Petersen 51'; Kath 90+1'	Report	Berggreen 90+2'	Stadium: Schwarzwald-Stadion; Attendance: 24,000; Referee: Daniel Siebert

1 December 2017 14	SC Freiburg	0–0	Hamburger SV	Freiburg
20:30 CET (UTC+1)		Report		Stadium: Schwarzwald-Stadion; Attendance: 24,000; Referee: Benjamin Brand

10 December 2017 15	1. FC Köln	3–4	SC Freiburg	Cologne
13:30 CET (UTC+1)	Klünter 8'; Guirassy 16' (pen.); Stanko 29' (o.g.)	Report	Petersen 39', 90' (pen.), 90+6' (pen.); Haberer 65'	Stadium: RheinEnergieStadion; Attendance: 45,100; Referee: Robert Kampka

12 December 2017 16	SC Freiburg	1–0	Borussia Mönchengladbach	Freiburg
20:40 CET (UTC+1)	Petersen 20' (pen.)	Report		Stadium: Schwarzwald-Stadion; Attendance: 23,800; Referee: Deniz Aytekin

16 December 2017 17	FC Augsburg	3–3	SC Freiburg	Augsburg
15:30 CET (UTC+1)	Finnbogason 1', 90+1', 90+3'	Report	Günter 20'; Petersen 48', 65'	Stadium: WWK Arena; Attendance: 26,345; Referee: Christian Dingert

13 January 2018 18	Eintracht Frankfurt	1–1	SC Freiburg	Frankfurt
15:30 CET (UTC+1)	Haller 28'	Report	Koch 51'	Stadium: Commerzbank-Arena; Attendance: 45,300; Referee: Sascha Stegemann

20 January 2018 19	SC Freiburg	2–1	RB Leipzig	Freiburg
15:30 CET (UTC+1)	Haberer 72'; Koch 76'	Report	Werner 65'	Stadium: Schwarzwald-Stadion; Attendance: 23,700; Referee: Benjamin Brand

27 January 2018 20	Borussia Dortmund	2–2	SC Freiburg	Dortmund
15:30 CET (UTC+1)	Kagawa 9'; Toljan 90+3'	Report	Petersen 21', 68'	Stadium: Signal Iduna Park; Attendance: 81,360; Referee: Daniel Siebert

3 February 2018 21	SC Freiburg	0–0	Bayer Leverkusen	Freiburg
15:30 CET (UTC+1)		Report		Stadium: Schwarzwald-Stadion; Attendance: 24,000; Referee: Robert Kampka

10 February 2018 22	Hannover 96	2–1	SC Freiburg	Hanover
15:30 CET (UTC+1)	Anton 28'; Klaus 54'	Report	Gulde 88'	Stadium: HDI-Arena; Attendance: 37,800; Referee: Manuel Gräfe

17 February 2018 23	SC Freiburg	1–0	Werder Bremen	Freiburg
15:30 CET (UTC+1)	Petersen 24' (pen.)	Report		Stadium: Schwarzwald-Stadion; Attendance: 24,000; Referee: Robert Hartmann

24 February 2018 24	1899 Hoffenheim	1–1	SC Freiburg	Sinsheim
15:30 CET (UTC+1)	Kramarić 57'	Report	Petersen 66' (pen.)	Stadium: Wirsol Rhein-Neckar-Arena; Attendance: 30,150; Referee: Christian Dingert

4 March 2018 25	SC Freiburg	0–4	Bayern Munich	Freiburg
18:00 CET (UTC+1)		Report	Schwolow 25' (o.g.); Tolisso 28'; Wagner 54'; Müller 69'	Stadium: Schwarzwald-Stadion; Attendance: 24,000; Referee: Frank Willenborg

10 March 2018 26	Hertha BSC	0–0	SC Freiburg	Berlin
15:30 CET (UTC+1)		Report		Stadium: Olympiastadion Berlin; Attendance: 38,625; Referee: Sven Jablonski

16 March 2018 27	SC Freiburg	1–2	VfB Stuttgart	Freiburg
20:30 CET (UTC+1)	Petersen 53'	Report	Gómez 4', 75'	Stadium: Schwarzwald-Stadion; Attendance: 24,000; Referee: Benjamin Brand

31 March 2018 28	Schalke 04	2–0	SC Freiburg	Gelsenkirchen
15:30 CEST (UTC+2)	Caligiuri 63' (pen.); Burgstaller 73'	Report		Stadium: Veltins-Arena; Attendance: 61,688; Referee: Tobias Stieler

7 April 2018 29	SC Freiburg	0–2	VfL Wolfsburg	Freiburg
15:30 CEST (UTC+2)		Report	Didavi 2', 83'	Stadium: Schwarzwald-Stadion; Attendance: 24,000; Referee: Sascha Stegemann

16 April 2018 30	Mainz 05	2–0	SC Freiburg	Mainz
20:30 CEST (UTC+2)	de Blasis 45+7' (pen.), 78'	Report		Stadium: Opel Arena; Attendance: 26,407; Referee: Guido Winkmann

21 April 2018 31	Hamburger SV	1–0	SC Freiburg	Hamburg
15:30 CEST (UTC+2)	Holtby 54'	Report		Stadium: Volksparkstadion; Attendance: 54,847; Referee: Benjamin Cortus

28 April 2018 32	SC Freiburg	3–2	1. FC Köln	Freiburg
15:30 CEST (UTC+2)	Petersen 14', 52'; Höler 90+2'	Report	Bittencourt 82', 87'	Stadium: Schwarzwald-Stadion; Attendance: 24,000; Referee: Deniz Aytekin

5 May 2018 33	Borussia Mönchengladbach	3–1	SC Freiburg	Mönchengladbach
15:30 CEST (UTC+2)	Hazard 18'; Elvedi 57'; Drmić 64'	Report	Kleindienst 59'	Stadium: Borussia-Park; Attendance: 54,018; Referee: Manuel Gräfe

12 May 2018 34	SC Freiburg	2–0	FC Augsburg	Freiburg
15:30 CEST (UTC+2)	Höfler 49'; Kleindienst 65'	Report		Stadium: Schwarzwald-Stadion; Attendance: 24,000; Referee: Bastian Dankert

=== DFB-Pokal ===
12 August 2017 First round	Germania Halberstadt	1–2	SC Freiburg	Halberstadt
15:30 CEST (UTC+2)	Michel 87'	Report	Petersen 34'; Lachheb 42' (o.g.)	Stadium: Friedensstadion; Attendance: 5,037; Referee: Christof Günsch

25 October 2017 Second round	SC Freiburg	3–1	Dynamo Dresden	Freiburg
20:45 CEST (UTC+2)	Petersen 50'; Schuster 61'; Haberer 81'	Report	Benatelli 48'	Stadium: Schwarzwald-Stadion; Attendance: 17,800; Referee: Benjamin Brand

20 December 2017 Round of 16	Werder Bremen	3–2	SC Freiburg	Bremen
18:30 CET (UTC+1)	Belfodil 3'; Kainz 20'; Bargfrede 69'	Report	Petersen 28' (pen.); Ravet 86'	Stadium: Weser-Stadion; Attendance: 33,519; Referee: Guido Winkmann

=== UEFA Europa League ===
==== Third qualifying round ====
27 July 2017 First leg	SC Freiburg (Germany)	1–0	(Slovenia) Domžale	Freiburg, Germany
21:05 CEST (UTC+2)	Petersen 20'	Report		Stadium: Schwarzwald-Stadion; Attendance: 14,000; Referee: Anatoliy Zhabchenko (Ukraine)

3 August 2017 Second leg	Domžale (Slovenia)	2–0 (2–1 agg.)	(Germany) SC Freiburg	Ljubljana, Slovenia
21:05 CEST (UTC+2)	Ibričić 50' (pen.); Bizjak 59'	Report		Stadium: Stožice Stadium; Attendance: 5,136; Referee: Alexandre Boucaut (Belgium)
