= Manuel Gulde =

German footballer (born 1991)

Personal information
- Date of birth: 12 February 1991 (age 35)
- Place of birth: Mannheim, Germany
- Height: 1.84 m (6 ft 0 in)
- Position: Centre-back

Youth career
- SC Pfingstberg-Hochstätt
- –2007: VfL Neckarau
- 2007–2008: TSG Hoffenheim

Senior career*
Years	Team	Apps	(Gls)
2008–2012	TSG Hoffenheim II	22	(1)
2009–2012	TSG Hoffenheim	7	(0)
2012–2013	SC Paderborn	13	(1)
2013–2016	Karlsruher SC	66	(4)
2013	Karlsruher SC II	4	(0)
2016–2025	SC Freiburg	164	(7)
Total		276	(13)

International career
2006–2007	Germany U16	10	(1)
2009	Germany U18	2	(0)
2008	Germany U19	2	(1)
- * Club domestic league appearances and goals

Manuel Gulde (born 12 February 1991) is a German former professional footballer who played as a centre-back.

== Club career ==
For the 2012–13 campaign Gulde joined SC Paderborn 07 on a one-year contract with an option for another year.

In May 2016, Guide signed with SC Freiburg for the forthcoming 2016–17 season.

On 4 May 2025, Gulde announced his retirement from professional football.

== International career ==
Gulde is a youth international for Germany.

== Career statistics ==
As of match played 11 May 2024

Appearances and goals by club, season and competition
Club	Season	League			DFB-Pokal		Continental		Other		Total	
Club	Season	Division	Apps	Goals	Apps	Goals	Apps	Goals	Apps	Goals	Apps	Goals
1899 Hoffenheim	2009–10	Bundesliga	6	0	0	0	—		—		6	0
1899 Hoffenheim	2010–11	Bundesliga	1	0	0	0	—		—		1	0
1899 Hoffenheim	Total		7	0	0	0	0	0	0	0	7	0
1899 Hoffenheim II	2010–11	Regionalliga Südwest	7	0	—		—		—		7	0
1899 Hoffenheim II	2011–12	Regionalliga Südwest	15	1	—		—		—		15	1
1899 Hoffenheim II	Total		22	1	0	0	0	0	0	0	22	1
SC Paderborn	2012–13	2. Bundesliga	13	1	0	0	—		—		13	1
Karlsruher SC	2013–14	2. Bundesliga	7	0	0	0	—		—		7	0
Karlsruher SC	2014–15	2. Bundesliga	32	2	2	0	—		2 (Note: Appearances in the 2. Bundesliga promotion play-offs)	0	36	2
Karlsruher SC	2015–16	2. Bundesliga	27	2	1	0	—		—		28	2
Karlsruher SC	Total		66	4	3	0	0	0	2	0	71	4
SC Freiburg	2016–17	Bundesliga	20	0	1	0	—		—		21	0
SC Freiburg	2017–18	Bundesliga	17	1	0	0	0	0	—		17	1
SC Freiburg	2018–19	Bundesliga	21	1	1	0	—		—		22	1
SC Freiburg	2019–20	Bundesliga	17	1	0	0	—		—		17	1
SC Freiburg	2020–21	Bundesliga	27	2	0	0	—		—		27	2
SC Freiburg	2021–22	Bundesliga	20	0	5	0	—		—		25	0
SC Freiburg	2022–23	Bundesliga	15	1	1	0	2 (Note: Appearances in UEFA Europa League)	0	—		18	1
SC Freiburg	2023–24	Bundesliga	27	1	1	0	8	0	—		36	1
SC Freiburg	Total		164	7	9	0	10	0	0	0	183	7
Career total			272	13	12	0	10	0	2	0	296	13
