= Nicolas Höfler =

German footballer

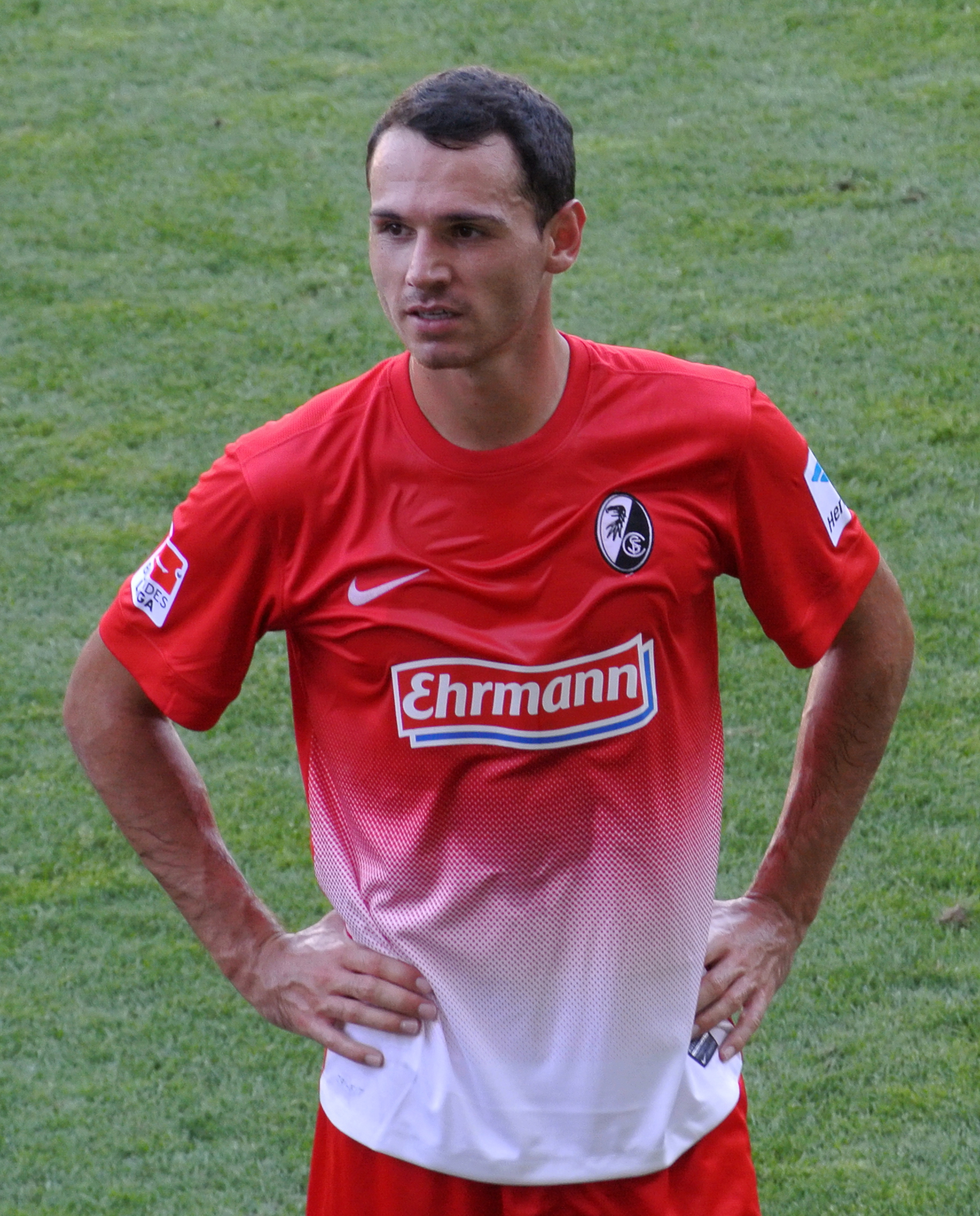
- Höfler with Freiburg in 2013

Personal information
- Date of birth: 9 March 1990 (age 36)
- Place of birth: Überlingen, West Germany
- Height: 1.81 m (5 ft 11 in)
- Position: Defensive midfielder

Team information
- Current team: SC Freiburg II
- Number: 27

Youth career
- Herdwanger SV
- 2001–2005: SC Pfullendorf
- 2005–2008: SC Freiburg

Senior career*
Years	Team	Apps	(Gls)
2008–2019	SC Freiburg II	79	(8)
2010–2026	SC Freiburg	325	(11)
2011–2012	→ Erzgebirge Aue II (loan)	4	(0)
2011–2013	→ Erzgebirge Aue (loan)	43	(1)
2026–	SC Freiburg II	6	(0)
- * Club domestic league appearances and goals as of 24 September 2026

Nicolas "Chicco" Höfler (born 9 March 1990) is a German former professional footballer who plays as a defensive midfielder for Regionalliga Südwest club SC Freiburg II. For most of his career, he played for SC Freiburg.

== Career ==
Born in Überlingen, Höfler joined SC Freiburg in 2005 and spent three years in the youth team and a further three in the reserves, before joining 2. Bundesliga side Erzgebirge Aue on a two-year loan in July 2011. He made his debut a month later, as a substitute for Guido Koçer in a 1–1 draw with Eintracht Braunschweig.

Höfler was part of Freiburg’s professional squad for 13 years. For many years, he was a regular starter in the defensive midfield position. His career at the club was seen as a positive example of the “Freiburg way”, which focuses on developing young players, integrating them into the first team, and continuously improving them there.

On 13 May 2026, Freiburg announced that Höfler would be retiring from professional football at the end of the 2025–26 season. On 20 May 2026, Höfler played his last professional match against Aston Villa at the 2025–26 Europa League final match. He will continue playing with the second team and set to serve as a senior squad member, passing on his experience to the younger players.

== Career statistics ==
As of match played 24 September 2026

Appearances and goals by club, season and competition
Club	Season	League			Cup		Continental		Other		Total	
Club	Season	Division	Apps	Goals	Apps	Goals	Apps	Goals	Apps	Goals	Apps	Goals
SC Freiburg II	2008–09	Regionalliga Süd	13	2	—		—		—		13	2
SC Freiburg II	2009–10	Regionalliga Süd	32	5	—		—		—		32	5
SC Freiburg II	2010–11	Regionalliga Süd	29	0	—		—		—		29	0
SC Freiburg II	2013–14	Regionalliga Südwest	4	1	—		—		—		4	1
SC Freiburg II	2018–19	Regionalliga Südwest	1	0	—		—		—		1	0
SC Freiburg II	Total		79	8	—		—		—		79	8
SC Freiburg	2010–11	Bundesliga	0	0	0	0	0	0	—		0	0
SC Freiburg	2013–14	Bundesliga	14	2	2	0	4 (Note: Appearances in UEFA Europa League)	0	0	0	20	2
SC Freiburg	2014–15	Bundesliga	20	0	2	0	—		0	0	22	0
SC Freiburg	2015–16	2. Bundesliga	33	2	2	0	—		—		35	2
SC Freiburg	2016–17	Bundesliga	28	1	1	0	—		—		29	1
SC Freiburg	2017–18	Bundesliga	27	1	2	0	2	0	0	0	31	1
SC Freiburg	2018–19	Bundesliga	18	0	2	0	—		—		20	0
SC Freiburg	2019–20	Bundesliga	32	1	1	0	—		—		33	1
SC Freiburg	2020–21	Bundesliga	31	1	2	0	—		—		33	1
SC Freiburg	2021–22	Bundesliga	30	2	5	1	—		—		35	3
SC Freiburg	2022–23	Bundesliga	32	0	5	1	7	1	—		44	2
SC Freiburg	2023–24	Bundesliga	28	1	2	0	10	0	—		39	1
SC Freiburg	2024–25	Bundesliga	19	0	2	0	—		—		21	0
SC Freiburg	2025–26	Bundesliga	13	0	0	0	6	0	—		19	0
SC Freiburg	Total		325	11	26	2	29	1	0	0	380	14
Erzgebirge Aue II (loan)	2011–12	Oberliga Süd	4	0	—		—		—		4	0
Erzgebirge Aue (loan)	2011–12	2. Bundesliga	13	1	1	0	—		0	0	14	1
Erzgebirge Aue (loan)	2012–13	2. Bundesliga	27	0	2	0	—		0	0	29	0
Erzgebirge Aue (loan)	Total		41	1	3	0	—		0	0	44	1
SC Freiburg II	2026–27	Regionalliga Südwest	6	0	—		—		0	0	6	0
Career total			454	20	31	2	29	1	0	0	513	23

== Honours ==
Freiburg

- Bundesliga U19: 2007–08
- DFB-Junior-Pokal: 2008–09
- 2. Bundesliga: 2015–16
- DFB-Pokal runner-up: 2021–22
- Europa League runner-up: 2025–26
