= Max Rosenfelder =

German footballer (born 2003)

Personal information
- Full name: Maximilian Rosenfelder
- Date of birth: 10 February 2003 (age 23)
- Height: 1.86 m (6 ft 1 in)
- Position: Centre-back

Team information
- Current team: SC Freiburg
- Number: 37

Youth career
- –2021: SC Freiburg

Senior career*
Years	Team	Apps	(Gls)
2021–2023	SC Freiburg II	43	(3)
2023–	SC Freiburg	40	(1)

International career^{‡}
2018–2019	Germany U16	4	(0)
2019	Germany U17	2	(0)
2020	Germany U18	1	(0)
2024–2025	Germany U21	11	(1)
Medal record
Men's football
Representing Germany
UEFA European Under-21 Championship
Runner-up	2025 Slovakia
- * Club domestic league appearances and goals as of 06:20, 1 November 2026 (UTC) ‡ National team caps and goals as of 11:51, 27 June 2025 (UTC)

Maximilian Rosenfelder (born 10 February 2003) is a German professional footballer who plays as a centre-back for SC Freiburg.

== Club career ==
Rosenfelder began his career in the youth team of SFE Freiburg before moving to the academy of SC Freiburg in 2014. In the summer of 2021, although still eligible to play for their under-19 side, Rosenfelder was promoted to the club's second team in the Third Division under his former youth coach Thomas Stamm. He made his professional league debut for SC Freiburg II in the following 2021–22 season and initially established himself as a first-choice centre-back before being sidelined with injury in autumn 2021. He only returned to action in the final stages of the season.

Rosenfelder spent most of the 2022–23 season as a regular starter in the Third Division, but he was once again plagued by several injuries.

For the 2023–24 season, Rosenfelder was officially promoted to the club's first team, but he missed the start of the season due to a Patellar tendinitis in his knee. After a break of several months, he made his comeback in March 2024, which also marked his debut for the senior side in a friendly match against Swiss club St. Gallen. In the Third Division, he was included in the squad again for the first time on matchday 35 in a game against SSV Ulm.

Under the new manager Julian Schuster he was part of the first squad in the 2024–25 preseason as well, participating in the training camp and multiple friendlies. He made his professional debut in the first match of the season, the DFB-Pokal match against VfL Osnabrück. A week later, he made his Bundesliga debut in the season opener against VfB Stuttgart, which Freiburg won 3–1. On matchday 31, Rosenfelder scored his first Bundesliga goal securing a 1–0 win in VfL Wolfsburg. After suffering an injury at the beginning of the 2025–26 season, he returned to the pitch on 20 May 2026, during the Europa League final against English Premier League club Aston Villa.

== International career ==
In 2017, he started playing in a special talents programme from the South Baden Football Association leading him towards the U16s of the German national team. Here he played under manager Christian Wück and later in the U18s he played a game under Manuel Baum. As of September 2021, he was also part of the German U19 national team squad under Hannes Wolf.

In August 2024, Rosenfelder was nominated by Antonio Di Salvo for the U21 national team and made his debut in a 5–1 win against Israel.

At the U-21 European Football Championship in Slovakia in June 2025, he started in four games and provided one assist. In the semi-final against France, he injured his already sore thigh and had to be substituted after just eleven minutes. Due to this muscle injury, he missed the final of the tournament.

In September 2026, Rosenfelder was one of players who were called up with the Germany national team by head coach Jürgen Klopp for the 2026–27 UEFA Nations League matches against Netherlands, Greece, Serbia and Greece between 24 September and 4 October 2026.

== Career statistics ==
As of match played 31 October 2026

Appearances and goals by club, season and competition
Club	Season	League			DFB-Pokal		Continental		Other		Total	
Club	Season	Division	Apps	Goals	Apps	Goals	Apps	Goals	Apps	Goals	Apps	Goals
SC Freiburg II	2021–22	3. Liga	19	1	—		—		—		19	1
SC Freiburg II	2022–23	3. Liga	21	2	—		—		—		21	2
SC Freiburg II	2023–24	3. Liga	3	0	—		—		—		3	0
SC Freiburg II	Total		43	3	—		—		—		43	3
SC Freiburg	2024–25	Bundesliga	24	2	3	0	—		—		27	2
SC Freiburg	2025–26	Bundesliga	12	0	2	0	4 (Note: Appearances in UEFA Europa League)	0	—		18	0
SC Freiburg	2026–27	Bundesliga	3	0	1	0	4 (Note: Appearances in UEFA Conference League)	0	—		8	0
SC Freiburg	Total		39	2	6	0	8	0	—		53	2
Career total			82	5	6	0	8	0	0	0	96	5

== Honours ==
SC Freiburg

- UEFA Europa League runner-up: 2025–26

Germany U21

- UEFA European Under-21 Championship runner-up: 2025
