= Merlin Röhl =

German footballer (born 2002)

Personal information
- Date of birth: 5 July 2002 (age 24)
- Place of birth: Potsdam, Germany
- Height: 1.91 m (6 ft 3 in)
- Positions: Right midfielder; central midfielder; right-back

Team information
- Current team: Everton
- Number: 34

Youth career
- –2018: SV Babelsberg 03
- 2018–2020: FC Ingolstadt

Senior career*
Years	Team	Apps	(Gls)
2020–2022	FC Ingolstadt	49	(4)
2019–2021	FC Ingolstadt II	1	(0)
2022–2023	SC Freiburg II	12	(0)
2022–2026	SC Freiburg	48	(2)
2025–2026	→ Everton (loan)	16	(1)
2026–	Everton	7	(0)

International career
2019	Germany U18	1	(0)
2020	Germany U19	1	(0)
2021–2023	Germany U20	9	(0)
2023–2025	Germany U21	13	(3)
Medal record
Men's football
Representing Germany
UEFA European Under-21 Championship
Runner-up	2025 Slovakia
- * Club domestic league appearances and goals as of 22:59, 6 November 2026 (UTC)

Merlin Röhl (born 5 July 2002) is a German professional footballer who plays as a right midfielder, central midfielder or right-back for Premier League club Everton.

== Early life ==
Röhl was born and grew up in Potsdam, Germany.

== Club career ==
=== Ingolstadt ===
Röhl started his youth career at SV Babelsberg 03, but moved to FC Ingolstadt in 2018 having had a trial spell at the club after sharing his performance data through the app Tonsser. He signed a long-term contract with the club in January 2020.

Röhl made his debut for FC Ingolstadt on 25 November 2020, starting in a 3–1 3. Liga win away to Bayern Munich II. He scored his first senior goal on 16 December 2020 with a right-footed volley in the 37th minute of a 1–0 league victory over Hansa Rostock.

=== Freiburg ===
On 17 August 2022, Röhl signed with Bundesliga side SC Freiburg. He initially played for the club's reserve side, SC Freiburg II, before making his Bundesliga debut as a substitute on 4 March 2023 in a 0-0 draw against Borussia Mönchengladbach. Röhl scored his first competitive goal for Freiburg on 9 November 2023 in a 5-0 win against FK TSC in the UEFA Europa League. His first Bundesliga goal came three days later in a 3-1 defeat to RB Leipzig. On 18 September 2024, Röhl signed a contract extension with the club. His 2024-25 season was disrupted by multiple injury spells, before he returned to the side towards the end of the campaign. Röhl made 60 competitive appearances for Freiburg, scoring three goals and providing 6 assists.

==== Loan to Everton ====
Röhl moved to Premier League side Everton on a season-long loan on 1 September 2025, the last day of the summer transfer window. The deal included an obligation to buy provided that Everton avoid relegation, with the reported fee being around €25 million including possible bonuses. On 17 May 2026, he scored his first goal for the club in a 3–1 defeat against Sunderland. Röhl made 16 Premier League appearances, starting six, with four of those starts coming in Everton's final four Premier league matches.

=== Everton ===
On 1 July 2026, Röhl signed permanently with Everton after the obligation to buy in his loan agreement was triggered by the club avoiding relegation from the Premier League the previous season. During pre-season, Röhl was tried in several positions, including right-back and central midfield. He subsequently began the 2026-27 Premier League season at right-back for Everton.

== International career ==
Röhl has represented Germany at both under-18, under-19, under-20 and under-21 levels as well.

== Style of play ==
Often considered a tall, versatile and technically gifted midfielder, Röhl has also played at left-back and further outfield on the right wing. His playing style and physical stature has earned him comparisons to Leon Goretzka.

== Career statistics ==
As of match played 6 September 2026

Appearances and goals by club, season and competition
Club	Season	League			National cup (Note: Includes DFB-Pokal, FA Cup)		League cup		Europe		Other		Total	
Club	Season	Division	Apps	Goals	Apps	Goals	Apps	Goals	Apps	Goals	Apps	Goals	Apps	Goals
FC Ingolstadt	2020–21	3. Liga	19	1	0	0	—		—		2 (Note: Appearances in 3. Liga promotion play-offs)	0	21	1
FC Ingolstadt	2021–22	2. Bundesliga	26	1	2	0	—		—		—		28	1
FC Ingolstadt	2022–23	3. Liga	4	2	2	0	—		—		—		6	2
FC Ingolstadt	Total		49	4	4	0	—		—		2	0	55	4
FC Ingolstadt II	2020–21	Bayernliga	1	0	—		—		—		—		1	0
SC Freiburg II	2022–23	3. Liga	12	0	—		—		—		—		12	0
SC Freiburg	2022–23	Bundesliga	3	0	0	0	—		0	0	—		3	0
SC Freiburg	2023–24	Bundesliga	24	2	2	0	—		8 (Note: Appearances in UEFA Europa League)	1	—		34	3
SC Freiburg	2024–25	Bundesliga	19	0	1	0	—		—		—		20	0
SC Freiburg	2025–26	Bundesliga	2	0	1	0	—		—		—		3	0
SC Freiburg	Total		48	2	4	0	—		8	1	—		60	3
Everton (loan)	2025–26	Premier League	16	1	1	0	0	0	—		—		17	1
Everton	2026–27	Premier League	3	0	0	0	1	0	—		—		4	0
Career total			129	7	9	0	1	0	8	1	2	0	149	8

== Honours ==
Germany U21

- UEFA European Under-21 Championship runner-up: 2025
