= 2024–25 SC Freiburg season =

SC Freiburg
2024–25 season
- President: Eberhard Fugmann
- Head coach: Julian Schuster
- Stadium: Europa-Park Stadion
- Bundesliga: 5th
- DFB-Pokal: Round of 16
- Top goalscorer: League: Ritsu Dōan (10); All: Ritsu Dōan; Vincenzo Grifo (10 each)
- Average home league attendance: 34,253
Home colours	Away colours	Third colours

The 2024–25 season was the 121st season in the history of SC Freiburg, and the club's ninth consecutive season in the Bundesliga. In addition to the domestic league, the club participated in the DFB-Pokal.

== Transfers ==
=== In ===
Pos.	Player	Transferred from	Fee	Date	Source
DF	(Belgium) Hugo Siquet	(Belgium) Cercle Brugge	Loan return	30 June 2024	
MF	(Germany) Patrick Osterhage	(Germany) VfL Bochum	€5,000,000	1 July 2024	
MF	(Germany) Eren Dinkçi	(Germany) Werder Bremen	€5,000,000	1 July 2024	
GK	(Germany) Jannik Huth	(Germany) SC Paderborn	Free	1 July 2024	
FW	(Germany) Maximilian Philipp	(Germany) VfL Wolfsburg	Undisclosed	1 July 2024	

=== Out ===
Pos.	Player	Transferred to	Fee	Date	Source
DF	(Hungary) Attila Szalai	(Germany) TSG Hoffenheim	Loan return	30 June 2024	
MF	(Germany) Yannik Keitel	(Germany) VfB Stuttgart	Free	1 July 2024	
MF	(Germany) Robert Wagner	(Germany) FC St. Pauli	Loan	1 July 2024	
DF	(Belgium) Hugo Siquet	(Belgium) Club Brugge	€3,000,000	23 July 2024	
DF	(Germany) Kenneth Schmidt	(Germany) Hannover 96	Loan	1 January 2025	
MF	(Germany) Noah Weißhaupt	(Germany) FC St. Pauli	Loan	2 January 2025	

== Friendlies ==
=== Pre-season ===
19 July 2024 Friendly	Rheindorf Altach (Austria)	1–1	(Germany) SC Freiburg	Altach, Austria
18:00 CEST (UTC+2)	Kronberger 85'	Report	Adamu 83'	Stadium: Stadion Schnabelholz; Attendance: 1,800; Referee: Matthias Gächter

26 July 2024 Friendly	SC Freiburg (Germany)	2–2	(Germany) Greuther Fürth	Schruns, Austria
14:00 CEST (UTC+2)	Adamu 41'; Dinkçi 108'	Report	Srbeny 45'; Çalhanoğlu 100' (pen.)	Stadium: Sportplatz Golm
Note: Match was played in two periods of 45 minutes and one period of 30 minutes.

3 August 2024 Friendly	Strasbourg (France)	2–2	(Germany) SC Freiburg	Colmar, France
15:30 CEST (UTC+2)	Doué 18'; Emegha 23'	Report	Grifo 38' (pen.); Adamu 67'	Stadium: Colmar Stadium

3 August 2024 Friendly	Strasbourg (France)	2–3	(Germany) SC Freiburg	Colmar, France
18:00 CEST (UTC+2)	Diong 15'; Fernandez 81'	Report	Muslija 12' (pen.); Höler 32'; Lienhart 56'	Stadium: Colmar Stadium

10 August 2024 Friendly	SC Freiburg (Germany)	2–2	(Italy) Fiorentina	Freiburg
15:30 CEST (UTC+2)	Gregoritsch 122' (pen.); Philipp 130'	Report	Kean 10'; Mandragora 72' (pen.)	Stadium: Europa-Park Stadion; Attendance: 33,300
Note: Match was played in three periods of 45 minutes each.

=== Mid-season ===
6 September 2024 Friendly	SC Freiburg (Germany)	6–0	(Switzerland) FC Basel	Freiburg
15:00 CEST (UTC+2)		Report		Stadium: Europa-Park Stadion

20 March 2025 Friendly	SC Freiburg (Germany)	1–2	(Germany) Karlsruher SC
13:00

== Competitions ==
=== Overall record ===
Competition	First match	Last match	Starting round	Final position	Record							
Competition	First match	Last match	Starting round	Final position	Pld	W	D	L	GF	GA	GD	Win %
Bundesliga	24 August 2024	17 May 2025	Matchday 1	5th	34	16	7	11	49	53	−4	47.06
DFB-Pokal	17 August 2024	3 December 2024	First round	Round of 16	3	2	0	1	7	4	+3	66.67
Total					37	18	7	12	56	57	−1	48.65

Source: Soccerway

=== Bundesliga ===
==== League table ====
Pos	Team	Pld	W	D	L	GF	GA	GD	Pts	Qualification or relegation
3	Eintracht Frankfurt	34	17	9	8	68	46	+22	60	Qualification for the Champions League league phase
4	Borussia Dortmund	34	17	6	11	71	51	+20	57	Qualification for the Champions League league phase
5	SC Freiburg	34	16	7	11	49	53	−4	55	Qualification for the Europa League league phase
6	Mainz 05	34	14	10	10	55	43	+12	52	Qualification for the Conference League play-off round
7	RB Leipzig	34	13	12	9	53	48	+5	51	

Source: Bundesliga
Rules for classification: 1) Points; 2) Goal difference; 3) Goals scored; 4) Head-to-head results; 5) Head-to-head away goals scored; 6) Away goals scored; 7) Play-off.
(Rules 4–6 only apply after home and away matches have been played between the tied teams.)

==== Results summary ====
Overall								Home						Away					
Pld	W	D	L	GF	GA	GD	Pts	W	D	L	GF	GA	GD	W	D	L	GF	GA	GD
34	16	7	11	49	53	−4	55	9	3	5	32	26	+6	7	4	6	17	27	−10

Last updated: 12 November 2025.
Source: DFB

==== Results by round ====
Round	1	2	3	4	5	6	7	8	9	10	11	12	13	14	15	16	17	18	19	20	21
Ground	H	A	H	A	H	A	H	A	H	A	A	H	A	H	A	H	A	A	H	A	H
Result	W	L	W	W	L	W	W	L	D	D	L	W	D	W	L	W	L	L	L	W	W
Position	1	9	6	3	7	4	3	5	6	5	7	6	7	5	9	8	7	7	10		

Updated to match(es) played on 8 February 2025. Source: DFB
A = Away; H = Home; W = Win; D = Draw; L = Loss

==== Matches ====
The league schedule was released on 4 July 2024.

24 August 2024 1	SC Freiburg	3–1	VfB Stuttgart	Freiburg
15:30 CEST (UTC+2)	Kübler 27', 61'; Adamu (yellow card) 41'; Dōan 54'; Lienhart (yellow card) 57'	Report	Demirović 2'; Mittelstädt (yellow card) 65'	Stadium: Europa-Park Stadion; Attendance: 34,700; Referee: Tobias Welz

1 September 2024 2	Bayern Munich	2–0	SC Freiburg	Munich
17:30 CEST (UTC+2)	Kane 38' (pen.); Müller 78'	Report		Stadium: Allianz Arena; Referee: Christian Dingert

14 September 2024 3	SC Freiburg	2–1	VfL Bochum	Freiburg
15:30 CEST (UTC+2)	Adamu 58', 61'	Report	Boadu 45'; Balde (yellow card) 81'; Kwarteng (yellow card) 82'; Wittek (yellow card) 90+5'	Stadium: Europa-Park Stadion; Attendance: 34,100; Referee: Daniel Siebert

21 September 2024 4	1. FC Heidenheim	0–3	SC Freiburg	Heidenheim
15:30 CEST (UTC+2)	Pieringer (yellow card) 74'	Report	Dōan 54'; Adamu (yellow card) 57'; Grifo 59', 65'	Stadium: Voith-Arena; Attendance: 15,000; Referee: Benjamin Brand

28 September 2024 5	SC Freiburg	0–3	FC St. Pauli	Freiburg
15:30 CEST (UTC+2)	Ginter (yellow card) 34'; Kübler (yellow card) 44'; Höfler (yellow card) 90+3'	Report	Saad 12', 72'; Afolayan 45'; Eggestein (yellow card) 53'; Saliakas (yellow card) 63'; Banks (yellow card) 90+5'	Stadium: Europa-Park Stadion; Attendance: 34,700; Referee: Timo Gerach

5 October 2024 6	Werder Bremen	0–1	SC Freiburg	Bremen
20:30	J.Malatini (yellow card) 90'	Report	E.Eggestein (yellow card) 36'; R.Doan 75'; P.Osterhage (yellow card) 83'	Stadium: Weserstadion; Referee: Tobias Welz

19 October 2024 7	SC Freiburg	3–1	FC Augsburg	Freiburg
20:30	Lienhart (yellow card) 24', (goal) 37'; Grifo 34'; Günter 45+1'	Report	Tietz 65'; M.Kömür (yellow card) 89'	Stadium: Europa-Park Stadion; Attendance: 33.500; Referee: Bastian Dankert

26 October 2024 8	RB Leipzig	3–1	SC Freiburg	Leipzig
15:30 CEST (UTC+2)	Orbán 47'; Geertruida 58'; Openda 79', (yellow card) 80'; Vermeeren (yellow card) 88'	Report	Dōan 15'; Adamu (yellow card) 38'; Lienhart (yellow card) 46'	Stadium: Red Bull Arena; Attendance: 45.918; Referee: Sven Jablonski

3 November 2024 9	SC Freiburg	0–0	Mainz 05	Freiburg
15:30	Sildillia (yellow card) 90+2'	Report	Lee Jae-sung (yellow card) 44'; Bell (yellow card) 70'	Stadium: Europa-Park Stadion; Attendance: 34.400; Referee: Benjamin Brand

8 November 2024 10	Union Berlin	0–0	SC Freiburg	Berlin
20:30 CET (UTC+1)	Khedira (yellow card) 19'; Keyhanfar (yellow card) 23'; Vogt (yellow card) 56'			Stadium: An der Alten Försterei; Attendance: 22,012; Referee: Tobias Reichel

23 November 2024 11	Borussia Dortmund	4–0	SC Freiburg	Dortmund
15:30 CET (UTC+1)	Beier 7'; Nmecha 40'; Brandt 66'; Gittens 77'; Couto (yellow card) 80'	Report	Osterhage (yellow card) 58' (yellow-red card) 63'; Adamu (red card) 90+3'	Stadium: Signal Iduna Park; Attendance: 81,365; Referee: Felix Brych

30 November 2024 12	SC Freiburg	3–1	Borussia Mönchengladbach	Freiburg
15:30	Höler 41', 63'; Doan 49'; Höfler (yellow card) 70'	Report	Hack (yellow card) 53'; Kleindienst 61'	Stadium: Europa-Park Stadion; Attendance: 34.700; Referee: Robert Hartmann

8 December 2024 13	TSG Hoffenheim	1–1	SC Freiburg	Sinsheim
17:30 CET (UTC+1)	Bischof 73'; Geiger (yellow card) 81'	Report	Osterhage (yellow card) 26'; Ginter 68'	Stadium: Rhein-Neckar-Arena; Attendance: 22,027; Referee: Sven Jablonski

14 December 2024 14	SC Freiburg	3–2	VfL Wolfsburg	Freiburg
20:30	Kübler (yellow card) 22', (goal) 42', 51'; Gregoritsch (yellow card) 31', (goal) 61'; Rosenfelder (yellow card) 76'; Eggestein (yellow card) 85'	Report	Wind 75'; Svanberg 83'; Vavro (yellow card) 88'	Stadium: Europa-Park Stadion; Attendance: 32,600; Referee: Sascha Stegemann

21 December 2025 15	Bayer Leverkusen	5–1	SC Freiburg	Leverkusen
18:30	Wirtz (penalty missed) 33', 51'; Schick 45+1', 67', 74', 77', (yellow card) 77'	Report	Kübler (yellow card) 24'; Grifo 55'; Röhl (yellow card) 90+1'	Stadium: BayArena; Referee: Tobias Stieler

11 January 2025 16	SC Freiburg	3–2	Holstein Kiel	Freiburg
15:30	Remberg 23' (o.g.); Kubler (yellow card) 58'; Günter 38'; Grifo 74'; Gregoritsch (yellow card) 90+5'	Report	Harres (yellow card) 37', (goal) 85', 90'; Gigović (yellow card) 45+3'; Javorček (yellow card) 90+5'	Stadium: Europa-Park Stadion; Referee: Sören Storks

14 January 2025 17	Eintracht Frankfurt	4–1	SC Freiburg	Frankfurt
20:30 CET (UTC+1)	Koch 43'; Marmoush 65'; Ekitike 71'; Collins 81'; Skhiri (yellow card) 84'	Report	Ginter (yellow card) 28'; Dōan 37'	Stadium: Deutsche Bank Park; Attendance: 56,500; Referee: Sven Jablonski

18 January 2025 18	VfB Stuttgart	4–0	SC Freiburg	Stuttgart
15:30 CET (UTC+1)	Rouault 2'; Vagnoman (yellow card) 11'; Demirović 17'; Woltemade 45+5' (pen.); Millot (yellow card) 45+5'; Karazor (yellow card) 53'; Undav 80', (yellow card) 84'; Bruun Larsen (yellow card) 82'	Report	Osterhage (yellow card) 15'; Lienhart (yellow card) 45+5'; Makengo (yellow card) 82'	Stadium: MHPArena; Attendance: 60,000; Referee: Felix Zwayer

25 January 2025 19	SC Freiburg	1–2	Bayern Munich	Freiburg
15:30	Kübler (yellow card) 52'; Atubolu (yellow card) 54'; Ginter 68'; Dōan (yellow card) 77'; Grifo (yellow card) 90+2'	Report	Kane 15', (yellow card) 63'; Kim 54'; Müller (yellow card) 90+3'	Stadium: Europa-Park Stadion; Referee: Daniel Siebert

1 February 2025 20	VfL Bochum	0–1	SC Freiburg	Bochum
15:30 CET (UTC+1)	Bero (yellow card) 42'; Bernardo (yellow card) 63'; Sissoko (yellow card) 84'	Report	Sildillia 34'; Atubolu (yellow card) 74'; Höfler (yellow card) 81'	Stadium: Ruhrstadion; Attendance: 25,900; Referee: Tobias Welz

8 February 2025 21	SC Freiburg	1–0	1. FC Heidenheim	Freiburg
15:30	Grifo 30', (yellow card) 76'; Eggestein (yellow card) 45+4'; Höler (yellow card) 55'	Report	Gimber (yellow card) 18'	Stadium: Europa-Park Stadion; Attendance: 34,000; Referee: Tobias Reichel

15 February 2025 22	FC St. Pauli	0–1	SC Freiburg	Hamburg

21 February 2025 23	SC Freiburg	5–0	Werder Bremen	Freiburg

2 March 2025 24	FC Augsburg	0–0	SC Freiburg	Augsburg

8 March 2025 25	SC Freiburg	0–0	RB Leipzig	Freiburg

15 March 2025 26	Mainz 05	2–2	SC Freiburg	Mainz

30 March 2025 27	SC Freiburg	1–2	Union Berlin	Freiburg

5 April 2025 28	SC Freiburg	1–4	Borussia Dortmund	Freiburg

12 April 2025 29	Borussia Mönchengladbach	1–2	SC Freiburg	Mönchengladbach

19 April 2025 30	SC Freiburg	3–2	TSG Hoffenheim	Freiburg

26 April 2025 31	VfL Wolfsburg	0–1	SC Freiburg	Wolfsburg

4 May 2025 32	SC Freiburg	2–2	Bayer Leverkusen	Freiburg

10 May 2025 33	Holstein Kiel	1–2	SC Freiburg	Kiel

17 May 2025 34	SC Freiburg	1–3	Eintracht Frankfurt	Freiburg

=== DFB-Pokal ===
17 August 2024 First round	VfL Osnabrück	0–4	SC Freiburg	Osnabrück
15:30 CEST (UTC+2)	Gyamfi (yellow card) 65'; Semić (yellow card) 89'	Report	Höler 30'; Grifo 33'; Adamu 73', 90+4'	Stadium: Stadion an der Bremer Brücke; Attendance: 15,500; Referee: Tobias Reichel

30 October 2024 Second round	SC Freiburg	2–1	Hamburger SV	Freiburg
18:00 CET (UTC+1)				Stadium: Europa-Park Stadion

3 December 2024 Round of 16	Arminia Bielefeld	3–1	SC Freiburg	Bielefeld
18:00 CET (UTC+1)	Lannert 28'; Kania 36' (pen.); Oppie 81'		Gregoritsch 63'	Stadium: Schüco-Arena; Attendance: 26,311; Referee: Frank Willenborg

== Statistics ==
=== Appearances and goals ===
No.	Pos	Nat	Player	Total		Bundesliga		DFB-Pokal	
No.	Pos	Nat	Player	Apps	Goals	Apps	Goals	Apps	Goals
Goalkeepers
1	GK	(Germany) GER	Noah Atubolu	27	0	26	0	1	0
21	GK	(Germany) GER	Florian Müller	12	0	8+1	0	3	0
31	GK	(Germany) GER	Jannik Huth	0	0	0	0	0	0
Defenders
3	DF	(Austria) AUT	Philipp Lienhart	35	1	31+1	1	2+1	0
5	DF	(Germany) GER	Manuel Gulde	0	0	0	0	0	0
17	DF	(Germany) GER	Lukas Kübler	30	5	22+6	5	1+1	0
19	DF	(Germany) GER	Jan-Niklas Beste	12	0	0+12	0	0	0
25	DF	(France) FRA	Kiliann Sildillia	22	2	8+13	2	1	0
28	DF	(Germany) GER	Matthias Ginter	34	3	28+4	2	2	1
30	DF	(Germany) GER	Christian Günter	32	2	27+2	2	3	0
33	DF	(France) FRA	Jordy Makengo	19	0	7+12	0	0	0
37	DF	(Germany) GER	Max Rosenfelder	28	1	13+12	1	2+1	0
43	DF	(Switzerland) SUI	Bruno Ogbus	3	0	0+2	0	1	0
Midfielders
6	MF	(Germany) GER	Patrick Osterhage	33	1	27+3	1	3	0
8	MF	(Germany) GER	Maximilian Eggestein	36	2	33	2	3	0
11	MF	(Ghana) GHA	Daniel-Kofi Kyereh	0	0	0	0	0	0
23	MF	(Kosovo) KOS	Florent Muslija	11	0	0+9	0	1+1	0
27	MF	(Germany) GER	Nicolas Höfler	22	0	7+13	0	0+2	0
32	MF	(Italy) ITA	Vincenzo Grifo	37	10	31+3	8	2+1	2
34	MF	(Germany) GER	Merlin Röhl	20	0	11+8	0	0+1	0
42	MF	(Japan) JPN	Ritsu Dōan	36	10	33+1	10	2	0
44	MF	(Switzerland) SUI	Johan Manzambi	11	2	4+7	2	0	0
Forwards
9	FW	(Germany) GER	Lucas Höler	34	7	21+10	6	2+1	1
18	FW	(Germany) GER	Eren Dinkçi	24	0	13+10	0	1	0
20	FW	(Austria) AUT	Junior Adamu	27	4	19+6	2	1+1	2
26	FW	(Germany) GER	Maximilian Philipp	3	0	0+2	0	1	0
38	FW	(Austria) AUT	Michael Gregoritsch	23	3	5+15	2	2+1	1
Players transferred out during the season
7	FW	(Germany) GER	Noah Weißhaupt	5	0	0+3	0	0+2	0

Last updated: 17 May 2025
Source: Competitions
