= 2022–23 SC Freiburg season =

SC Freiburg
2022–23 season
- President: Eberhard Fugmann
- Head coach: Christian Streich
- Stadium: Europa-Park Stadion
- Bundesliga: 5th
- DFB-Pokal: Semi-finals
- UEFA Europa League: Round of 16
- Top goalscorer: League: Vincenzo Grifo (15); All: Vincenzo Grifo (17)
Home colours	Away colours	Third colours

The 2022–23 season was the 124th season in the existence of SC Freiburg and the club's seventh consecutive season in the top flight of German football. In addition to the domestic league, SC Freiburg participated in this season's edition of the DFB-Pokal and the UEFA Europa League. The season covers the period from 1 July 2022 to 30 June 2023.

== Players ==
As of 14 January 2023.

Note: Flags indicate national team as defined under FIFA eligibility rules; some limited exceptions apply. Players may hold more than one non-FIFA nationality.

No.	Pos.	Nation	Player
1	GK	GER	Benjamin Uphoff
3	DF	AUT	Philipp Lienhart
5	DF	GER	Manuel Gulde
7	MF	FRA	Jonathan Schmid
8	MF	GER	Maximilian Eggestein
9	FW	GER	Lucas Höler
11	MF	GHA	Daniel-Kofi Kyereh
14	MF	GER	Yannik Keitel
17	DF	GER	Lukas Kübler
18	FW	GER	Nils Petersen (vice-captain)
21	GK	GER	Noah Atubolu
22	MF	HUN	Roland Sallai
23	MF	GER	Robert Wagner

No.	Pos.	Nation	Player
24	DF	GER	Kimberly Ezekwem
25	DF	FRA	Kiliann Sildillia
26	GK	NED	Mark Flekken
27	MF	GER	Nicolas Höfler
28	DF	GER	Matthias Ginter
29	MF	KOR	Jeong Woo-yeong
30	DF	GER	Christian Günter (captain)
32	MF	ITA	Vincenzo Grifo (3rd captain)
33	MF	GER	Noah Weißhaupt
34	MF	GER	Merlin Röhl
38	FW	AUT	Michael Gregoritsch
42	MF	JPN	Ritsu Dōan

=== Out on loan ===
Note: Flags indicate national team as defined under FIFA eligibility rules; some limited exceptions apply. Players may hold more than one non-FIFA nationality.

No.	Pos.	Nation	Player
2	DF	BEL	Hugo Siquet (at Cercle Brugge until 30 June 2023)
20	FW	GER	Kevin Schade (at Brentford until 30 June 2023)
31	DF	GER	Keven Schlotterbeck (at VfL Bochum until 30 June 2023)
45	FW	SUI	Nishan Burkart (at FC Winterthur until 30 June 2023)

== Transfers ==
=== In ===
Pos.	Player	Transferred from	Fee	Date	Source
DF	Matthias Ginter (GER)	Borussia Mönchengladbach (GER)	Free	1 July 2022	
FW	Daniel-Kofi Kyereh (GHA)	FC St. Pauli (GER)	€4,500,000	1 July 2022	
FW	Ritsu Dōan (JPN)	PSV Eindhoven (NED)	€8,500,000	5 July 2022	
FW	Michael Gregoritsch (AUT)	FC Augsburg (GER)	Free	8 July 2022	
MF	Merlin Röhl (GER)	FC Ingolstadt (GER)	€1,200,000	17 August 2022	

=== Out ===
Pos.	Player	Transferred to	Fee	Date	Source
MF	Janik Haberer (GER)	Union Berlin (GER)	Free	1 July 2022	
DF	Gian-Luca Itter (GER)	Greuther Fürth (GER)	€300,000	1 July 2022	
DF	Nico Schlotterbeck (GER)	Borussia Dortmund (GER)	€20,000,000	1 July 2022	
GK	Niclas Thiede (GER)	SC Verl (GER)	Free	1 July 2022	
FW	Ermedin Demirović (BIH)	FC Augsburg (GER)	Free	8 July 2022	
FW	Nishan Burkart (SUI)	FC Winterthur (SUI)	Loan	31 August 2022	
DF	Keven Schlotterbeck (GER)	VfL Bochum (GER)	Loan	2 January 2023	
FW	Kevin Schade (GER)	Brentford (ENG)	Loan	4 January 2023	
DF	Hugo Siquet (BEL)	Cercle Brugge (BEL)	Loan	14 January 2023	

== Pre-season and friendlies ==
Win Draw Loss

2 July 2022 Friendly	SC Freiburg (Germany)	0–0	(Germany) SV Elversberg	Freiburg
14:00 CEST (UTC+2)		Report	Dacaj (penalty missed) 20'	Stadium: Dreisamstadion; Attendance: 4,800

9 July 2022 Friendly	St. Gallen (Switzerland)	3–4	(Germany) SC Freiburg	Schruns, Austria
15:00 CEST (UTC+2)	Von Moos 12'; Guindo 27'; Schubert 63'	Report	Schmid 2'; Gulde 59'; Dōan 85'; Höler 109'	Stadium: Sportplatz Golm; Attendance: 1,000
Note: Match was played in two 60-minute halves.

16 July 2022 Friendly	SC Freiburg (Germany)	3–0	(Spain) Rayo Vallecano	Freiburg
15:00 CEST (UTC+2)	Sallai (yellow card) 8'; Siquet 17'; Petersen 43'; Ezekwem 55'	Report	F. García (yellow card) 69'	Stadium: Europa-Park Stadion

16 July 2022 Friendly	SC Freiburg (Germany)	1–0	(France) Rennes	Freiburg
17:30 CEST (UTC+2)	Gregoritsch 71'	Report		Stadium: Europa-Park Stadion; Attendance: 13,000

23 July 2022 Friendly	Strasbourg (France)	3–3	(Germany) SC Freiburg	Colmar, France
16:00 CEST (UTC+2)	Gameiro 68'; Sahi 87'; Aholou 105'		Dōan 14'; Grifo 40'; Kyereh 134'	Stadium: Colmar Stadium; Attendance: 3,500; Referee: Abdelatif Kherradji (France)
Note: Match was played in three 45-minute periods. Rémi Landry took over officiating the match.

9 December 2022 Friendly	SC Freiburg (Germany)	2–2	(Switzerland) Luzern	Freiburg
14:00 CET (UTC+1)	Höler 37'; Breunig 80'	Report	Max Meyer 20'; Beka 40'	Stadium: Europa-Park-Stadion, Trainingsplatz

16 December 2022 Friendly	SC Freiburg (Germany)	3–2	(Germany) Karlsruher SC	Freiburg
13:30 CET (UTC+1)	Gregoritsch 56'; Schade 89'; Höler 90'	Report	Gordon 73'; Mirković 115'	Stadium: Dreisamstadion
Note: Match was played in four 30-minute periods.

22 December 2022 Friendly	SC Freiburg (Germany)	1–1	(Switzerland) Young Boys	Freiburg
14:30 CET (UTC+1)	Kübler 43'		Rrudhani 28'	Stadium: Europa-Park Stadion; Referee: Daniel Schlager

7 January 2023 Friendly	SC Freiburg (Germany)	3–2	(Switzerland) Basel	La Línea de la Concepción, Spain
15:00 CET (UTC+1)	Xhaka 12' (o.g.); Gregoritsch 53'; Höler 104'	Report	Males 72'; Fink 76'	Stadium: Marbella Football Centre
Note: Match was played in four 30-minute periods.

13 January 2023 Friendly	SC Freiburg (Germany)	6–2	(Germany) Hamburger SV	Sotogrande, Spain
12:30 CET (UTC+1)	Grifo 7' (pen.); Gulde 10'; Kyereh 11', 13'; Gregoritsch (penalty missed) 58'; Jeong 86'; Petersen 107'	Report	Glatzel 4', 32'	Stadium: Santa Maria Polo Cancha 1
Note: Match was played in two 45-minute periods plus a 50-minute period.

== Competitions ==
=== Overall record ===
Competition	First match	Last match	Starting round	Final position	Record							
Competition	First match	Last match	Starting round	Final position	Pld	W	D	L	GF	GA	GD	Win %
Bundesliga	6 August 2022	27 May 2023	Matchday 1	5th	34	17	8	9	51	44	+7	50.00
DFB-Pokal	31 July 2022	2 May 2023	First round	Semi-finals	5	4	0	1	9	8	+1	80.00
UEFA Europa League	8 September 2022	16 March 2023	Group stage	Round of 16	8	4	2	2	13	6	+7	50.00
Total					47	25	10	12	73	58	+15	53.19

Source: Soccerway

=== Bundesliga ===
==== League table ====
Pos	Team	Pld	W	D	L	GF	GA	GD	Pts	Qualification or relegation
3	RB Leipzig	34	20	6	8	64	41	+23	66	Qualification for the Champions League group stage
4	Union Berlin	34	18	8	8	51	38	+13	62	Qualification for the Champions League group stage
5	SC Freiburg	34	17	8	9	51	44	+7	59	Qualification for the Europa League group stage (Note: Since the 2022–23 DFB-Pokal winners, RB Leipzig, qualified for the Champions League based on league position, the Europa League group stage spot was passed to the sixth-placed team, and the Europa Conference League play-off round spot was passed to the seventh-placed team.)
6	Bayer Leverkusen	34	14	8	12	57	49	+8	50	Qualification for the Europa League group stage
7	Eintracht Frankfurt	34	13	11	10	58	52	+6	50	Qualification for the Europa Conference League play-off round

Source: DFB
Rules for classification: 1) Points; 2) Goal difference; 3) Goals scored; 4) Head-to-head results; 5) Head-to-head away goals scored; 6) Away goals scored; 7) Play-off.

==== Results summary ====
Overall								Home						Away					
Pld	W	D	L	GF	GA	GD	Pts	W	D	L	GF	GA	GD	W	D	L	GF	GA	GD
34	17	8	9	51	44	+7	59	10	4	3	28	13	+15	7	4	6	23	31	−8

Source: DFB

==== Results by round ====
Round	1	2	3	4	5	6	7	8	9	10	11	12	13	14	15	16	17	18	19	20	21	22	23	24	25	26	27	28	29	30	31	32	33	34
Ground	A	H	A	H	A	H	A	H	A	A	H	A	H	A	H	A	H	H	A	H	A	H	A	H	A	H	H	A	H	A	H	A	H	A
Result	W	L	W	W	W	D	D	W	D	L	W	W	W	L	W	L	D	W	L	W	W	D	D	W	D	D	L	W	W	W	L	L	W	L
Position	2	7	5	3	1	2	3	2	2	3	3	3	2	3	2	4	6	5	6	4	4	5	5	5	4	4	5	5	4	4	5	5	5	5

Source: DFB
A = Away; H = Home; W = Win; D = Draw; L = Loss

==== Matches ====
The league fixtures were announced on 17 June 2022.

6 August 2022 1	FC Augsburg	0–4	SC Freiburg	Augsburg
15:30 CEST (UTC+2)		Report	Gregoritsch 46'; Grifo 48'; Ginter 61'; Dōan 78'	Stadium: WWK Arena; Attendance: 25,310; Referee: Bastian Dankert

12 August 2022 2	SC Freiburg	1–3	Borussia Dortmund	Freiburg
20:30 CEST (UTC+2)	Gregoritsch 35'; Kyereh (yellow card) 86'	Report	Meunier (yellow card) 33'; Bellingham (yellow card) 60'; Schlotterbeck (yellow card) 67'; Bynoe-Gittens 77'; Moukoko 84'; Wolf 88'	Stadium: Europa-Park Stadion; Attendance: 34,700; Referee: Tobias Welz

20 August 2022 3	VfB Stuttgart	0–1	SC Freiburg	Stuttgart
15:30 CEST (UTC+2)	Sosa (yellow card) 15'; Führich (yellow card) 28'; Ahamada (yellow card) 46'; Mavropanos (yellow card) 90+8'	Report	Grifo 11'; Sallai (yellow card) 28'; Keitel (yellow card) 84'	Stadium: Mercedes-Benz Arena; Attendance: 47,500; Referee: Felix Brych

26 August 2022 4	SC Freiburg	1–0	VfL Bochum	Freiburg
20:30 CEST (UTC+2)	Grifo (penalty missed) 48', 48'; Sallai (yellow card) 77'; Höfler (yellow card) 83'	Report	Stafylidis (yellow card) 42'; Riemann (yellow card) 48'	Stadium: Europa-Park Stadion; Attendance: 32,800; Referee: Marco Fritz

3 September 2022 5	Bayer Leverkusen	2–3	SC Freiburg	Leverkusen
15:30 CEST (UTC+2)	Tah (yellow card) 5'; Demirbay 16'; Schick 65'; Amiri (yellow card) 82'	Report	Höfler (yellow card) 34'; Ginter 48'; Gregoritsch 50', (yellow card) 53'; Dōan 71'	Stadium: BayArena; Attendance: 26,853; Referee: Sascha Stegemann

11 September 2022 6	SC Freiburg	0–0	Borussia Mönchengladbach	Freiburg
17:30 CEST (UTC+2)	Günter (yellow card) 54'	Report	Bensebaini (yellow card) 62'	Stadium: Europa-Park Stadion; Attendance: 33,000; Referee: Tobias Stieler

18 September 2022 7	1899 Hoffenheim	0–0	SC Freiburg	Hoffenheim
19:30 CEST (UTC+2)	Dabbur (yellow card) 80'	Report	Günter (yellow card) 56'; Ginter (yellow card) 80'	Stadium: Rhein-Neckar-Arena; Attendance: 24,233; Referee: Deniz Aytekin

1 October 2022 8	SC Freiburg	2–1	Mainz 05	Freiburg
15:30 CEST (UTC+2)	Gregoritsch 3'; Kyereh 37'; Höfler (yellow card) 70'; Keitel (yellow card) 90+4'	Report	Bell (yellow card) 33'; Martín 52'; Barreiro (yellow card) 53'; Stach (yellow card) 60'; Kohr (yellow card) 90'	Stadium: Europa-Park Stadion; Attendance: 34,700; Referee: Sven Jablonski

9 October 2022 9	Hertha BSC	2–2	SC Freiburg	Berlin
17:30 CEST (UTC+2)	Lukebakio 34' (pen.); Rogel (yellow card) 43'; Kenny (yellow card) 49'; Serdar 61'	Report	Kyereh 22'; Schade 78'; Dōan (yellow card) 83'	Stadium: Olympiastadion; Attendance: 40,481; Referee: Robert Schröder

16 October 2022 10	Bayern Munich	5–0	SC Freiburg	Munich
19:30 CEST (UTC+2)	Gnabry 13'; Choupo-Moting 33'; Sané 52'; Mané 55'; Sabitzer 80'	Report	Gregoritsch (yellow card) 50'; Sildillia (yellow card) 51'	Stadium: Allianz Arena; Attendance: 75,000; Referee: Sascha Stegemann

22 October 2022 11	SC Freiburg	2–0	Werder Bremen	Freiburg
15:30 CEST (UTC+2)	Höfler (yellow card) 42'; Kübler 56'; Grifo 80' (pen.); Eggestein (yellow card) 90'	Report	Friedl (red card) 14'; Füllkrug (yellow card) 60'; Buchanan (yellow card) 79'	Stadium: Europa-Park Stadion; Attendance: 34,700; Referee: Bastian Dankert

30 October 2022 12	Schalke 04	0–2	SC Freiburg	Gelsenkirchen
17:30 CEST (UTC+2)	Polter (yellow card) 18'; Krauß (yellow card) 73'; Yoshida (yellow card) 90'	Report	Ginter (yellow card) 41'; Grifo 45+1', 61' (pen.); Günter (yellow card) 88'	Stadium: Veltins-Arena; Attendance: 61,115; Referee: Christian Dingert

6 November 2022 13	SC Freiburg	2–0	1. FC Köln	Freiburg
17:30 CET (UTC+1)	Jeong 52'; Gregoritsch 64'	Report	Schindler (yellow card) 90'	Stadium: Europa-Park Stadion; Attendance: 33,800; Referee: Florian Badstübner

9 November 2022 14	RB Leipzig	3–1	SC Freiburg	Leipzig
20:30 CET (UTC+1)	Simakan 54'; Nkunku 56', (yellow card) 90'; Forsberg 78' (pen.)	Report	Dōan (yellow card) 41'; Jeong (yellow card) 43'; Sildillia (yellow card) 46'; Kübler 66'; Sallai (yellow card) 88'	Stadium: Red Bull Arena; Attendance: 41,240; Referee: Harm Osmers

13 November 2022 15	SC Freiburg	4–1	Union Berlin	Freiburg
17:30 CET (UTC+1)	Grifo 4' (pen.), 6', 20' (pen.); Gregoritsch 45+1'	Report	Knoche (penalty missed) 9'; Leite (red card) 19'; Pantović (yellow card) 79'; Michel 84' (pen.)	Stadium: Europa-Park Stadion; Attendance: 33,800; Referee: Deniz Aytekin

21 January 2023 16	VfL Wolfsburg	6–0	SC Freiburg	Wolfsburg
15:30 CET (UTC+1)	Wimmer 1'; Otávio (yellow card) 22'; Wind 28', 37'; Gerhardt 56'; Baku 80'; Waldschmidt 90+4' (pen.)	Report	Jeong (yellow card) 53'; Eggestein (yellow card) 72'	Stadium: Volkswagen Arena; Attendance: 25,849; Referee: Felix Zwayer

25 January 2023 17	SC Freiburg	1–1	Eintracht Frankfurt	Freiburg
20:30 CET (UTC+1)	Eggestein (yellow card) 22'; Ginter 47'; Höfler (yellow card) 58'; Keitel (yellow card) 90+3'	Report	Kamada (yellow card) 22'; Kolo Muani 42'; Ndicka (yellow card) 59'; Lindstrøm (yellow card) 67'	Stadium: Europa-Park Stadion; Attendance: 34,700; Referee: Deniz Aytekin

28 January 2023 18	SC Freiburg	3–1	FC Augsburg	Freiburg
15:30 CET (UTC+1)	Gregoritsch 13'; Höler 30'; Lienhart (yellow card) 37', (goal) 85'; Eggestein (yellow card) 75'; Wagner (yellow card) 79'	Report	Uduokhai (yellow card) 7'; Berisha 29' (pen.), (yellow card) 36'; Demirović (yellow card) 68'	Stadium: Europa-Park Stadion; Attendance: 33,500; Referee: Christian Dingert

4 February 2023 19	Borussia Dortmund	5–1	SC Freiburg	Dortmund
15:30 CET (UTC+1)	Guerreiro (yellow card) 23'; Schlotterbeck 26'; Adeyemi (yellow card) 27', (goal) 48'; Brandt (yellow card) 35'; Haller 51'; Brandt 69'; Reyna 82'	Report	Sildillia (yellow card) 15' (yellow-red card) 17'; Höler 45'; Kyereh (yellow card) 56'; Gregoritsch (yellow card) 78'	Stadium: Signal Iduna Park; Attendance: 81,365; Referee: Robert Schröder

11 February 2023 20	SC Freiburg	2–1	VfB Stuttgart	Freiburg
15:30 CET (UTC+1)	Grifo 60' (pen.), 84' (pen.), (yellow card) 85'; Höfler (yellow card) 63'; Günter (yellow card) 74'	Report	Führich 30'; Karazor (yellow card) 40'; Zagadou (yellow card) 59'; Ito (yellow card) 90+7'	Stadium: Europa-Park Stadion; Attendance: 34,700; Referee: Sascha Stegemann

18 February 2023 21	VfL Bochum	0–2	SC Freiburg	Bochum
15:30 CET (UTC+1)	Zoller (yellow card) 34'; Losilla (red card) 63'; Broschinski (yellow card) 79'; Osei-Tutu (yellow card) 90+5'	Report	Gregoritsch 39'; Lienhart (yellow card) 43'; Höler 51'; Günter (yellow card) 62'; Schlotterbeck (yellow card) 76'	Stadium: Vonovia Ruhrstadion; Attendance: 25,100; Referee: Felix Zwayer

26 February 2023 22	SC Freiburg	1–1	Bayer Leverkusen	Freiburg
15:30 CET (UTC+1)	Sallai (yellow card) 26'; Grifo 29'; Gregoritsch (yellow card) 33'	Report	Demirbay (yellow card) 27'; Azmoun 67'	Stadium: Europa-Park Stadion; Attendance: 34,000; Referee: Daniel Siebert

4 March 2023 23	Borussia Mönchengladbach	0–0	SC Freiburg	Mönchengladbach
15:30 CET (UTC+1)	Stindl (yellow card) 15'; Elvedi (yellow card) 40'; Thuram (yellow card) 84'; Bensebaini (yellow card) 87' (yellow-red card) 87'	Report	Lienhart (yellow card) 67'; Höfler (yellow card) 90+2'	Stadium: Borussia-Park; Attendance: 53,014; Referee: Benjamin Brand

12 March 2023 24	SC Freiburg	2–1	1899 Hoffenheim	Freiburg
15:30 CET (UTC+1)	Eggestein 5'; Höfler (yellow card) 67'; Dōan 89'; Petersen (yellow card) 90+1'	Report	Stiller 49'; Kabak (yellow card) 52' (yellow-red card) 83'; Geiger (yellow card) 73'; Brooks (yellow card) 84'; Akpoguma (yellow card) 90'	Stadium: Europa-Park Stadion; Attendance: 33,500; Referee: Harm Osmers

19 March 2023 25	Mainz 05	1–1	SC Freiburg	Mainz
19:30 CET (UTC+1)	Ajorque (yellow card) 57'; Caci (yellow card) 88'; Onisiwo 90+6'	Report	Ginter (yellow card) 35'; Gulde (yellow card) 51'; Dōan 55'	Stadium: Mewa Arena; Attendance: 26,800; Referee: Bastian Dankert

1 April 2023 26	SC Freiburg	1–1	Hertha BSC	Freiburg
15:30 CEST (UTC+2)	Gulde (yellow card) 28'; Grifo 52'	Report	Ngankam 77', (yellow card) 90+2'	Stadium: Europa-Park Stadion; Attendance: 34,700; Referee: Sven Jablonski

8 April 2023 27	SC Freiburg	0–1	Bayern Munich	Freiburg
15:30 CEST (UTC+2)	Kübler (yellow card) 90+1'; Höler (yellow card) 90+6'	Report	De Ligt 51'; Mané (yellow card) 74'; Kimmich (yellow card) 90+6'	Stadium: Europa-Park Stadion; Attendance: 34,700; Referee: Daniel Siebert

16 April 2023 28	Werder Bremen	1–2	SC Freiburg	Bremen
15:30 CEST (UTC+2)	Groß (yellow card) 11'; Philipp 46'; Stark (yellow card) 73'	Report	Dōan (yellow card) 13'; Eggestein (yellow card) 31'; Sallai (yellow card) 42', (goal) 66'; Höler 71'	Stadium: Wohninvest Weserstadion; Attendance: 42,100; Referee: Florian Badstübner

23 April 2023 29	SC Freiburg	4–0	Schalke 04	Freiburg
15:30 CEST (UTC+2)	Gregoritsch 7', 35'; Höler 52'; Ginter 82'; Keitel (yellow card) 87'	Report	Uronen (yellow card) 45'; Latza (yellow card) 90'	Stadium: Europa-Park Stadion; Attendance: 34,700; Referee: Robert Hartmann

29 April 2023 30	1. FC Köln	0–1	SC Freiburg	Cologne
15:30 CEST (UTC+2)	Martel (yellow card) 24'	Report	Dōan 54'; Höfler (yellow card) 61'	Stadium: RheinEnergieStadion; Attendance: 55,000; Referee: Tobias Reichel

6 May 2023 31	SC Freiburg	0–1	RB Leipzig	Freiburg
15:30 CEST (UTC+2)	Grifo (yellow card) 83'	Report	Haidara (yellow card) 21'; Nkunku (yellow card) 36'; Laimer (yellow card) 64'; Kampl 73', (yellow card) 90'	Stadium: Europa-Park Stadion; Attendance: 32,900; Referee: Tobias Welz

13 May 2023 32	Union Berlin	4–2	SC Freiburg	Berlin
15:30 CEST (UTC+2)	Behrens 5', (yellow card) 33'; Khedira (yellow card) 15'; Becker 36', 38', (yellow card) 37'; Laïdouni 80'	Report	Gulde 56'; Grifo 70' (pen.); Gregoritsch (yellow card) 90+5'	Stadium: Stadion An der Alten Försterei; Attendance: 22,012; Referee: Marco Fritz

19 May 2023 33	SC Freiburg	2–0	VfL Wolfsburg	Freiburg
20:30 CEST (UTC+2)	Sallai (yellow card) 31'; Günter 71'; Petersen 75'; Höfler (red card) 90+3'	Report	Wind (yellow card) 39'; Wimmer (yellow card) 54'; Gerhardt (yellow card) 67'	Stadium: Europa-Park Stadion; Attendance: 33,300; Referee: Bastian Dankert

27 May 2023 34	Eintracht Frankfurt	2–1	SC Freiburg	Frankfurt
15:30 CEST (UTC+2)	Sow (yellow card) 45+3'; Buta (yellow card) 65'; Kolo Muani 83'; Dina Ebimbe 90+1', (yellow card) 90+2'; Aaronson (yellow card) 90+6'	Report	Grifo 44'; Schmidt (yellow card) 34'; Eggestein (yellow card) 83'	Stadium: Deutsche Bank Park; Attendance: 50,500; Referee: Deniz Aytekin

=== DFB-Pokal ===
31 July 2022 First round	1. FC Kaiserslautern	1–2 (a.e.t.)	SC Freiburg	Kaiserslautern
15:31 CEST (UTC+2)	Niehues (yellow card) 1'; Ritter 33', (yellow card) 112'; Wunderlich (yellow card) 39'; Lobinger (yellow card) 90'; Zuck (yellow card) 95'	Report	Lienhart (yellow card) 58'; Sallai 82'; Höfler (yellow card) 101'; Kyereh (yellow card) 106'; Dōan 111'	Stadium: Fritz-Walter-Stadion; Attendance: 38,317; Referee: Jörg Jablonksi

19 October 2022 Second round	SC Freiburg	2–1 (a.e.t.)	FC St. Pauli	Freiburg
18:00 CEST (UTC+2)	Kübler (yellow card) 80'; Ginter 90+3'; Gregoritsch 119'	Report	Fazliji (yellow card) 41'; Daschner 42', (yellow card) 79'; Paqarada (yellow card) 44'; Aremu (yellow card) 79'; Wieckhoff (yellow card) 98'; Irvine (yellow card) 103'; Dźwigała (yellow card) 120+2'	Stadium: Europa-Park Stadion; Attendance: 33,000; Referee: Felix Brych

7 February 2023 Round of 16	SV Sandhausen	0–2	SC Freiburg	Sandhausen
18:00 CET (UTC+1)		Report	Lienhart (yellow card) 39', (goal) 87'; Petersen 90+5'	Stadium: BWT-Stadion am Hardtwald; Attendance: 11,782; Referee: Marco Fritz

4 April 2023 Quarter-finals	Bayern Munich	1–2	SC Freiburg	Munich
20:45 CEST (UTC+2)	Upamecano 19', (yellow card) 83'; Mané (yellow card) 90+2'; Musiala (yellow card) 90+3'; Pavard (yellow card) 90+3'	Report	Höfler 27'; Gregoritsch (yellow card) 36'; Sildillia (yellow card) 61'; Höler 90+5' (pen.)	Stadium: Allianz Arena; Attendance: 75,000; Referee: Harm Osmers

2 May 2023 Semi-finals	SC Freiburg	1–5	RB Leipzig	Freiburg
20:45 CEST (UTC+2)	Kübler (yellow card) 68'; Gregoritsch 75'; Sallai (yellow card) 90+4'	Report	Olmo 13'; Henrichs 14'; Szoboszlai 37', 90+7' (pen.); Nkunku 45+1', (yellow card) 60'; Gvardiol (red card) 58'; Blaswich (yellow card) 70'; Laimer (yellow card) 85'	Stadium: Europa-Park Stadion; Attendance: 34,700; Referee: Sven Jablonski

=== UEFA Europa League ===
==== Group stage ====
The draw for the group stage was held on 26 August 2022.

Pos	Team	Pld	W	D	L	GF	GA	GD	Pts	Qualification	FRE	NAN	QRB	OLY
1	(Germany) SC Freiburg	6	4	2	0	13	3	+10	14	Advance to round of 16	—	2–0	2–1	1–1
2	(France) Nantes	6	3	0	3	6	11	−5	9	Advance to knockout round play-offs	0–4	—	2–1	2–1
3	(Azerbaijan) Qarabağ	6	2	2	2	9	5	+4	8	Transfer to Europa Conference League	1–1	3–0	—	0–0
4	(Greece) Olympiacos	6	0	2	4	2	11	−9	2		0–3	0–2	0–3	—

Source: UEFA
Rules for classification: Group stage tiebreakers

8 September 2022 1	SC Freiburg (Germany)	2–1	(Azerbaijan) Qarabağ	Freiburg
21:00 CEST (UTC+2)	Grifo 7' (pen.), (yellow card) 45+2'; Dōan 15', (yellow card) 51'	Report	Bayramov (yellow card) 6'; Vešović 39'; Zoubir (yellow card) 81'; Owusu (yellow card) 90+4'	Stadium: Europa-Park Stadion; Attendance: 31,500; Referee: Erik Lambrechts (Belgium)

15 September 2022 2	Olympiacos (Greece)	0–3	(Germany) SC Freiburg	Piraeus, Greece
18:45 CEST (UTC+2)	Rodrigues (yellow card) 77'	Report	Höfler 5', (yellow card) 80'; Gregoritsch 25', 52'; Lienhart (yellow card) 60'	Stadium: Karaiskakis Stadium; Attendance: 23,104; Referee: Matej Jug (Slovenia)

6 October 2022 3	SC Freiburg (Germany)	2–0	(France) Nantes	Freiburg
21:00 CEST (UTC+2)	Kyereh 48'; Sildillia (yellow card) 66'; Grifo 72'; Günter (yellow card) 78'; Keitel (yellow card) 90'	Report	Mohamed (yellow card) 66'	Stadium: Europa-Park Stadion; Attendance: 33,200; Referee: Glenn Nyberg (Sweden)

13 October 2022 4	Nantes (France)	0–4	(Germany) SC Freiburg	Nantes, France
18:45 CEST (UTC+2)		Report	Kübler 25'; Höfler (yellow card) 66'; Gregoritsch 71'; Schade 82'; Jeong 87'	Stadium: Stade de la Beaujoire; Attendance: 31,845; Referee: Horațiu Feșnic (Romania)

27 October 2022 5	SC Freiburg (Germany)	1–1	(Greece) Olympiacos	Freiburg
21:00 CEST (UTC+2)	Kübler 90+3'; Ginter (yellow card) 90+7'	Report	El-Arabi 17', (yellow card) 82'; M'Vila (yellow card) 28'; Masouras (yellow card) 80'; Paschalakis (yellow card) 90+1'; Kunde (yellow card) 90+4'; Ba (yellow card) 90+5' (yellow-red card) 90+6'; Retsos (yellow card) 90+7'	Stadium: Europa-Park Stadion; Attendance: 33,000; Referee: Kristo Tohver (Estonia)

3 November 2022 6	Qarabağ (Azerbaijan)	1–1	(Germany) SC Freiburg	Baku, Azerbaijan
18:45 CET (UTC+1)	Mustafazade (yellow card) 24'; Janković (yellow card) 48'; Kady (yellow card) 55'; Medina (red card) 62'; Owusu 90+2'; Romão (yellow card) 90+3'	Report	Petersen 25' (pen.); Schade (yellow card) 34'; Keitel (yellow card) 64'; Schlotterbeck (yellow card) 74'	Stadium: Tofiq Bahramov Republican Stadium; Attendance: 30,430; Referee: Aleksei Kulbakov (Belarus)

==== Knockout phase ====
===== Round of 16 =====
The draw for the round of 16 was held on 24 February 2023.

9 March 2023 First leg	Juventus (Italy)	1–0	(Germany) SC Freiburg	Turin, Italy
21:00 CET (UTC+1)	Di María 53'; Bremer (yellow card) 72'; Bonucci (yellow card) 84'	Report	Ginter (yellow card) 24'; Höler (yellow card) 51'	Stadium: Juventus Stadium; Attendance: 37,474; Referee: Anastasios Sidiropoulos (Greece)

16 March 2023 Second leg	SC Freiburg (Germany)	0–2 (0–3 agg.)	(Italy) Juventus	Freiburg
18:45 CET (UTC+1)	Gulde (yellow card) 26' (yellow-red card) 44'; Höfler (yellow card) 44'; Sallai (yellow card) 87'	Report	Vlahović 45' (pen.), (yellow card) 56'; Iling-Junior (yellow card) 82'; Chiesa 90+5'	Stadium: Europa-Park Stadion; Attendance: 33,420; Referee: Serdar Gözübüyük (Netherlands)

== Statistics ==
=== Appearances and goals ===
No.	Pos	Nat	Player	Total		Bundesliga		DFB-Pokal		Europa League	
No.	Pos	Nat	Player	Apps	Goals	Apps	Goals	Apps	Goals	Apps	Goals
Goalkeepers
1	GK	(Germany) GER	Benjamin Uphoff	0	0	0	0	0	0	0	0
21	GK	(Germany) GER	Noah Atubolu	3	0	0	0	2	0	1	0
26	GK	(Netherlands) NED	Mark Flekken	44	0	34	0	3	0	7	0
Defenders
3	DF	(Austria) AUT	Philipp Lienhart	39	2	27+2	1	3+1	1	6	0
5	DF	(Germany) GER	Manuel Gulde	18	1	8+7	1	1	0	1+1	0
17	DF	(Germany) GER	Lukas Kübler	33	4	19+3	2	4	0	4+3	2
24	DF	(Germany) GER	Kimberly Ezekwem	1	0	0+1	0	0	0	0	0
25	DF	(France) FRA	Kiliann Sildillia	38	0	23+4	0	2+2	0	6+1	0
28	DF	(Germany) GER	Matthias Ginter	47	5	34	4	5	1	7+1	0
30	DF	(Germany) GER	Christian Günter	46	1	31+2	1	5	0	8	0
35	DF	(Germany) GER	Kenneth Schmidt	6	0	3+2	0	0	0	0+1	0
Midfielders
7	MF	(France) FRA	Jonathan Schmid	3	0	0+3	0	0	0	0	0
8	MF	(Germany) GER	Maximilian Eggestein	43	1	27+4	1	5	0	5+2	0
11	MF	(Ghana) GHA	Daniel-Kofi Kyereh	18	3	7+5	2	0+2	0	3+1	1
14	MF	(Germany) GER	Yannik Keitel	31	0	8+14	0	1+1	0	3+4	0
22	MF	(Hungary) HUN	Roland Sallai	26	2	10+9	1	1+3	1	1+2	0
23	MF	(Germany) GER	Robert Wagner	5	0	0+4	0	0	0	1	0
27	MF	(Germany) GER	Nicolas Höfler	44	2	32	0	4+1	1	7	1
29	MF	(South Korea) KOR	Jeong Woo-yeong	34	2	4+22	1	3	0	2+3	1
32	MF	(Italy) ITA	Vincenzo Grifo	46	17	30+3	15	3+2	0	6+2	2
33	MF	(Germany) GER	Noah Weisshaupt	27	0	3+15	0	1+2	0	1+5	0
34	MF	(Germany) GER	Merlin Röhl	3	0	0+3	0	0	0	0	0
42	MF	(Japan) JPN	Ritsu Dōan	45	7	30+3	5	4+1	1	6+1	1
Forwards
9	FW	(Germany) GER	Lucas Höler	32	6	16+10	5	2+1	1	3	0
18	FW	(Germany) GER	Nils Petersen	38	3	0+27	1	1+3	1	3+4	1
38	FW	(Austria) AUT	Michael Gregoritsch	42	15	27+3	10	4+1	2	4+3	3
Players transferred out during the season
2	DF	(Belgium) BEL	Hugo Siquet	3	0	0+2	0	0	0	1	0
20	FW	(Germany) GER	Kevin Schade	12	2	1+7	1	0	0	1+3	1
31	DF	(Germany) GER	Keven Schlotterbeck	5	0	0+2	0	1	0	1+1	0
45	FW	(Switzerland) SUI	Nishan Burkart	0	0	0	0	0	0	0	0

Last updated: 27 May 2023
Source: Competitions

=== Goalscorers ===
Rank	Pos.	No.	Nat.	Player	Bundesliga	DFB-Pokal	UEFA EL	Total
1	MF	32	(Italy)	Vincenzo Grifo	12	0	2	14
2	FW	38	(Austria)	Michael Gregoritsch	8	1	3	12
3	DF	17	(Germany)	Lukas Kübler	2	0	2	4
3	DF	28	(Germany)	Matthias Ginter	3	1	0	4
3	MF	42	(Japan)	Ritsu Dōan	2	1	1	4
6	FW	9	(Germany)	Lucas Höler	3	0	0	3
6	MF	11	(Ghana)	Daniel-Kofi Kyereh	2	0	1	3
8	DF	3	(Austria)	Philipp Lienhart	1	1	0	2
8	FW	18	(Germany)	Nils Petersen	0	1	1	2
8	FW	20	(Germany)	Kevin Schade	1	0	1	2
8	MF	29	(South Korea)	Jeong Woo-yeong	1	0	1	2
12	MF	22	(Hungary)	Roland Sallai	0	1	0	1
12	MF	27	(Germany)	Nicolas Höfler	0	0	1	1
Own goals					0	0	0	0
Totals					35	6	13	54

Last updated: 26 February 2023
