= 2021–22 SC Freiburg season =

SC Freiburg
2021–22 season
- President: Fritz Keller
- Head coach: Christian Streich
- Stadium: SC-Stadion
- Bundesliga: 6th
- DFB-Pokal: Runners-up
- Top goalscorer: League: Vincenzo Grifo (9); All: Vincenzo Grifo (13)
Home colours	Away colours	Third colours

The 2021–22 season was the 123rd season in the existence of SC Freiburg and the club's sixth consecutive season in the top flight of German football. In addition to the domestic league, SC Freiburg participated in this season's edition of the DFB-Pokal.

== Players ==
=== First-team squad ===
As of 1 January 2022.

Note: Flags indicate national team as defined under FIFA eligibility rules; some limited exceptions apply. Players may hold more than one non-FIFA nationality.

No.	Pos.	Nation	Player
1	GK	GER	Benjamin Uphoff
2	DF	BEL	Hugo Siquet
3	DF	AUT	Philipp Lienhart
4	DF	GER	Nico Schlotterbeck
5	DF	GER	Manuel Gulde
7	DF	FRA	Jonathan Schmid
8	MF	GER	Maximilian Eggestein
9	FW	GER	Lucas Höler
11	FW	BIH	Ermedin Demirović
14	MF	GER	Yannik Keitel
17	DF	GER	Lukas Kübler
18	FW	GER	Nils Petersen (vice-captain)
19	MF	GER	Janik Haberer

No.	Pos.	Nation	Player
20	FW	GER	Kevin Schade
21	GK	GER	Noah Atubolu
22	MF	HUN	Roland Sallai
24	DF	GER	Kimberly Ezekwem
25	DF	FRA	Kiliann Sildillia
26	GK	NED	Mark Flekken
27	MF	GER	Nicolas Höfler
29	FW	KOR	Jeong Woo-yeong
30	DF	GER	Christian Günter (captain)
31	DF	GER	Keven Schlotterbeck
32	MF	ITA	Vincenzo Grifo (3rd captain)
33	MF	GER	Noah Weißhaupt
45	FW	SUI	Nishan Burkart

=== Out on loan ===
Note: Flags indicate national team as defined under FIFA eligibility rules; some limited exceptions apply. Players may hold more than one non-FIFA nationality.

No.	Pos.	Nation	Player
—	GK	GER	Niclas Thiede (at (Germany) SC Verl until 30 June 2022)
—	DF	GER	Luca Itter (at (Germany) Greuther Fürth until 30 June 2022)
—	MF	GER	Lino Tempelmann (at (Germany) 1. FC Nürnberg until 30 June 2022)

No.	Pos.	Nation	Player
—	MF	GER	Carlo Boukhalfa (at (Germany) Jahn Regensburg until 30 June 2022)
—	FW	GER	Marvin Pieringer (at (Germany) Schalke 04 until 30 June 2022)

== Transfers ==
=== In ===
Pos	Player	Transferred from	Fee	Date	Source
MF	(Germany) Maximilian Eggestein	(Germany) Werder Bremen	€5,000,000	18 August 2021	
DF	(Belgium) Hugo Siquet	(Belgium) Standard Liège	€4,500,000	1 January 2022	

=== Out ===
Pos	Player	Transferred to	Fee	Date	Source
FW	(South Korea) Kwon Chang-hoon	(South Korea) Suwon Samsung Bluewings	Free	22 May 2021	
GK	(Germany) Florian Muller	(Germany) Mainz 05	Loan Return	22 May 2021	
MF	(Netherlands) Guus Til	(Russia) Spartak Moscow	Loan Return	22 May 2021	
MF	(Germany) Lino Tempelmann	(Germany) 1. FC Nürnberg	Loan	1 June 2021	
GK	(Germany) Niclas Thiede	(Germany) SC Verl	Loan	1 June 2021	
MF	(Albania) Amir Abrashi	(Switzerland) Grasshopper	Free	23 June 2021	
MF	(Germany) Florian Kath	(Germany) 1. FC Magdeburg	Free	24 June 2021	
MF	(Australia) Brandon Borrello	(Germany) Dynamo Dresden	Undisclosed	3 July 2021	
MF	(France) Baptiste Santamaria	(France) Rennes	€14,000,000	17 August 2021	
DF	(Germany) Dominique Heintz	(Germany) Union Berlin	Undisclosed	1 January 2022	

== Pre-season and friendlies ==
Win Draw Loss

10 July 2021 Friendly	SC Freiburg (Germany)	2–1	(Germany) 1. FC Saarbrücken	Freiburg, Germany
15:00 CEST (UTC+2)	Sildillia 47'; Weisshaupt 53'	Report	Grimaldi 9'	Stadium: Dreisamstadion; Attendance: 2,900; Referee: Matthias Jöllenbeck

16 July 2021 Friendly	SC Freiburg (Germany)	1–1	(Liechtenstein) Vaduz	Schruns, Austria
15:00 CEST (UTC+2)	Höfler 72' (pen.)	Report	Schmid 43'	Stadium: Schruns Stadium; Attendance: 400
Note: The match was played in two halves 60 minutes each.

23 July 2021 Friendly	Bayer Leverkusen (Germany)	0–0	(Germany) SC Freiburg	Wattens, Austria
14:00 CEST (UTC+2)		Report		Stadium: Gernot Langes Stadion; Attendance: 500

31 July 2021 Friendly	Strasbourg (France)	2–1	(Germany) SC Freiburg	Strasbourg, France
16:30 CEST (UTC+2)	Gameiro 39'; Waris 64'	Report	Keitel 89'	Stadium: Stade de la Meinau; Attendance: 10,000

31 July 2021 Friendly	Strasbourg (France)	1–2	(Germany) SC Freiburg	Strasbourg, France
18:30 CEST (UTC+2)	Chahiri 28'	Report	Furrer 2'; Heintz 88' (pen.)	Stadium: Stade de la Meinau; Attendance: 10,000

7 October 2021 Friendly	SC Freiburg (Germany)	3–0	(Germany) FC St. Pauli	Freiburg, Germany
18:15 CEST (UTC+2)	Grifo 17', 29'; Burkart 68'	Report		Stadium: SC-Stadion; Attendance: 15,000; Referee: Matthias Jöllenbeck

11 November 2021 Friendly	Karlsruher SC (Germany)	1–2	(Germany) SC Freiburg	Karlsruhe, Germany
13:00 CET (UTC+1)	Kother 53'	Report	Burkart 7'; Kübler 30'	Stadium: Platz 2 Wildparkstadion; Attendance: 300; Referee: Tobias Reichel

== Competitions ==
=== Overall record ===
Competition	First match	Last match	Starting round	Final position	Record							
Competition	First match	Last match	Starting round	Final position	Pld	W	D	L	GF	GA	GD	Win %
Bundesliga	14 August 2021	14 May 2022	Matchday 1	6th	34	15	10	9	58	46	+12	44.12
DFB-Pokal	8 August 2021	21 May 2022	First round	Runners-up	6	4	2	0	13	6	+7	66.67
Total					40	19	12	9	71	52	+19	47.50

Source: Soccerway

=== Bundesliga ===
==== League table ====
Pos	Team	Pld	W	D	L	GF	GA	GD	Pts	Qualification or relegation
4	RB Leipzig	34	17	7	10	72	37	+35	58	Qualification for the Champions League group stage
5	Union Berlin	34	16	9	9	50	44	+6	57	Qualification for the Europa League group stage (Note: Since the 2021–22 DFB-Pokal winners, RB Leipzig, qualified for the Champions League based on league position, the Europa League group stage spot was passed to the sixth-placed team, and the Europa Conference League play-off round spot was passed to the seventh-placed team.)
6	SC Freiburg	34	15	10	9	58	46	+12	55	Qualification for the Europa League group stage
7	1. FC Köln	34	14	10	10	52	49	+3	52	Qualification for the Europa Conference League play-off round
8	Mainz 05	34	13	7	14	50	45	+5	46	

Source: DFB
Rules for classification: 1) Points; 2) Goal difference; 3) Goals scored; 4) Head-to-head results; 5) Head-to-head away goals scored; 6) Away goals scored; 7) Play-off.

==== Results summary ====
Overall								Home						Away					
Pld	W	D	L	GF	GA	GD	Pts	W	D	L	GF	GA	GD	W	D	L	GF	GA	GD
34	15	10	9	58	46	+12	55	8	5	4	32	25	+7	7	5	5	26	21	+5

Source: DFB

==== Results by round ====
Round	1	2	3	4	5	6	7	8	9	10	11	12	13	14	15	16	17	18	19	20	21	22	23	24	25	26	27	28	29	30	31	32	33	34
Ground	A	H	A	H	A	H	A	H	A	H	A	H	A	A	H	A	H	H	A	H	A	H	A	H	A	H	A	H	A	H	H	A	H	A
Result	D	W	W	D	D	W	W	D	W	W	L	L	L	W	L	D	W	D	L	W	L	D	W	W	D	W	D	L	W	W	D	W	L	L
Position	11	5	4	5	6	5	4	4	3	3	3	3	4	4	5	5	3	4	6	5	5	6	6	5	6	5	5	5	5	5	5	4	5	6

Source: DFB
A = Away; H = Home; W = Win; D = Draw; L = Loss

==== Matches ====
The league fixtures were announced on 25 June 2021.

14 August 2021 1	Arminia Bielefeld	0–0	SC Freiburg	Bielefeld
15:30 CEST (UTC+2)	Prietl (yellow card) 17'; Laursen (yellow card) 30'; Klos (yellow card) 89'	Report	Keitel (yellow card) 34'; Gulde (yellow card) 37'; Höfler (yellow card) 75'; Demirović (yellow card) 90+3'	Stadium: Bielefelder Alm; Attendance: 13,750; Referee: Sven Jablonski

21 August 2021 2	SC Freiburg	2–1	Borussia Dortmund	Freiburg
15:30 CEST (UTC+2)	Grifo 6'; Sallai 53'; Demirović (yellow card) 86'	Report	Malen (yellow card) 19'; Dahoud (yellow card) 34'; Keitel 59' (o.g.); Akanji (yellow card) 61'; Guerreiro (yellow card) 76'	Stadium: Schwarzwald-Stadion; Attendance: 10,100; Referee: Robert Schröder

28 August 2021 3	VfB Stuttgart	2–3	SC Freiburg	Stuttgart
15:30 CEST (UTC+2)	Förster (yellow card) 13'; Mavropanos 45'; Al Ghaddioui 45+2'; Klimowicz (yellow card) 55'	Report	Jeong 3', 9'; Höler 28'; Schade (yellow card) 89'	Stadium: Mercedes-Benz Arena; Attendance: 25,000; Referee: Frank Willenborg

11 September 2021 4	SC Freiburg	1–1	1. FC Köln	Freiburg
15:30 CEST (UTC+2)	Schade (yellow card) 74'; Czichos 89' (o.g.)	Report	Modeste 34', (yellow card) 69'; Kainz (yellow card) 51' (yellow-red card) 74'	Stadium: Schwarzwald-Stadion; Attendance: 10,000; Referee: Harm Osmers

18 September 2021 5	Mainz 05	0–0	SC Freiburg	Mainz
15:30 CEST (UTC+2)	Hack (yellow card) 45'; Zentner (yellow card) 90+3'	Report	N. Schlotterbeck (yellow card) 64'	Stadium: Opel Arena; Attendance: 13,500; Referee: Benjamin Brand

26 September 2021 6	SC Freiburg	3–0	FC Augsburg	Freiburg
17:30 CEST (UTC+2)	Kübler 6'; Höler 25'; Grifo 33' (pen.)	Report	Gouweleeuw (yellow card) 73'	Stadium: Schwarzwald-Stadion; Attendance: 14,400; Referee: Daniel Schlager

2 October 2021 7	Hertha BSC	1–2	SC Freiburg	Berlin
15:30 CEST (UTC+2)	Boateng (yellow card) 29'; Serdar (yellow card) 69'; Piątek 70'; Jastrzembski (yellow card) 90+4'	Report	Lienhart 17'; Petersen 78'	Stadium: Olympiastadion; Attendance: 18,376; Referee: Patrick Ittrich

16 October 2021 8	SC Freiburg	1–1	RB Leipzig	Freiburg
15:30 CEST (UTC+2)	Jeong 64'	Report	Forsberg 32' (pen.); Haidara (yellow card) 44'; Gvardiol (yellow card) 57'; Simakan (yellow card) 85'; Mukiele (yellow card) 89'	Stadium: Europa-Park Stadion; Attendance: 20,000; Referee: Daniel Siebert

23 October 2021 9	VfL Wolfsburg	0–2	SC Freiburg	Wolfsburg
15:30 CEST (UTC+2)	Steffen (yellow card) 7'; Guilavogui (yellow card) 26'; Mbabu (yellow card) 71'	Report	Lienhart 27'; Höler 68'	Stadium: Volkswagen Arena; Attendance: 10,251; Referee: Tobias Welz

30 October 2021 10	SC Freiburg	3–1	Greuther Fürth	Freiburg
15:30 CEST (UTC+2)	Asta 20' (o.g.); Höfler 39'; Grifo 79' (pen.)	Report	Green (yellow card) 41'; Christiansen (yellow card) 50'; Leweling 74'	Stadium: Europa-Park Stadion; Attendance: 31,500; Referee: Felix Brych

6 November 2021 11	Bayern Munich	2–1	SC Freiburg	Munich
15:30 CET (UTC+1)	Goretzka 30'; Lewandowski 75'	Report	Haberer 90+2'	Stadium: Allianz Arena; Attendance: 75,000; Referee: Sascha Stegemann

21 November 2021 12	SC Freiburg	0–2	Eintracht Frankfurt	Freiburg
15:30 CET (UTC+1)		Report	Lindstrøm 34'; Kostić 43'; Chandler (yellow card) 49'; Tuta (yellow card) 53'; Touré (yellow card) 69'; Trapp (yellow card) 73'	Stadium: Europa-Park Stadion; Attendance: 32,500; Referee: Florian Badstübner

27 November 2021 13	VfL Bochum	2–1	SC Freiburg	Bochum
15:30 CET (UTC+1)	Losilla (yellow card) 32'; Polter 54'; Pantović 82'; Antwi-Adjei (yellow card) 90+1'	Report	Lienhart 51'; Kübler (yellow card) 58'	Stadium: Vonovia Ruhrstadion; Attendance: 19,700; Referee: Patrick Ittrich

5 December 2021 14	Borussia Mönchengladbach	0–6	SC Freiburg	Mönchengladbach
17:30 CET (UTC+1)	Bensebaini (yellow card) 15'; Koné (yellow card) 24'	Report	Eggestein 2'; Schade 5'; Lienhart 12'; Höfler 19'; Höler 25'; N. Schlotterbeck 37'; Demirović (yellow card) 44'	Stadium: Borussia-Park; Attendance: 10,025; Referee: Robert Hartmann

11 December 2021 15	SC Freiburg	1–2	1899 Hoffenheim	Freiburg
15:30 CET (UTC+1)	Lienhart (yellow card) 16'; N. Schlotterbeck 21'; Grifo (penalty missed) 62'; Kübler (yellow card) 87'; Höler (yellow card) 90'; Günter (yellow card) 90'	Report	Raum 3'; Posch (yellow card) 38'; Akpoguma (yellow card) 61'; Vogt (yellow card) 80'; Richards 90+4'	Stadium: Europa-Park Stadion; Referee: Frank Willenborg

15 December 2021 16	Union Berlin	0–0	SC Freiburg	Berlin
20:30 CET (UTC+1)	Becker (yellow card) 77'	Report	Höfler (yellow card) 35'	Stadium: Stadion An der Alten Försterei; Attendance: 5,000; Referee: Deniz Aytekin

19 December 2021 17	SC Freiburg	2–1	Bayer Leverkusen	Freiburg
15:30 CET (UTC+1)	N. Schlotterbeck (yellow card) 30'; Grifo 33' (pen.); Schade 84'; Höler (yellow card) 86'	Report	Frimpong (yellow card) 32'; Andrich (yellow card) 39'; Aránguiz 45+1'; Kossounou (yellow card) 82'	Stadium: Europa-Park Stadion; Attendance: 750; Referee: Benjamin Cortus

8 January 2022 18	SC Freiburg	2–2	Arminia Bielefeld	Freiburg
15:30 CET (UTC+1)	Haberer 6'; Joeng 46'; K. Schlotterbeck (yellow card) 53'; Gulde (yellow card) 76'	Report	Okugawa 60'; Hack (yellow card) 69'; Lasme 87'	Stadium: Europa-Park Stadion; Attendance: 500; Referee: Harm Osmers

14 January 2022 19	Borussia Dortmund	5–1	SC Freiburg	Dortmund
20:30 CET (UTC+1)	Meunier 14', 29'; Haaland 45+1', 75', (yellow card) 88'; Brandt (yellow card) 76'; Dahoud 86'	Report	Demirović 61'	Stadium: Signal Iduna Park; Attendance: 750; Referee: Florian Badstübner

22 January 2022 20	SC Freiburg	2–0	VfB Stuttgart	Freiburg
15:30 CET (UTC+1)	Höfler (yellow card) 24'; Ito 37' (o.g.); Schade 72'	Report	Sosa (yellow card) 90+4'	Stadium: Europa-Park Stadion; Attendance: 500; Referee: Tobias Stieler

5 February 2022 21	1. FC Köln	1–0	SC Freiburg	Cologne
15:30 CET (UTC+1)	Modeste 23'; Thielmann (yellow card) 65'; Ljubičić (yellow card) 68'	Report	Jeong (yellow card) 81'; Höfler (yellow card) 83'	Stadium: RheinEnergieStadion; Attendance: 10,000; Referee: Felix Brych

12 February 2022 22	SC Freiburg	1–1	Mainz 05	Freiburg
15:30 CET (UTC+1)	Petersen 69'	Report	Stach (yellow card) 7'; Hack 31'; Kohr (yellow card) 76'	Stadium: Europa-Park Stadion; Attendance: 10,000; Referee: Deniz Aytekin

19 February 2022 23	FC Augsburg	1–2	SC Freiburg	Augsburg
15:30 CET (UTC+1)	Gregoritsch 16'; Hahn (yellow card) 63'	Report	Petersen 4'; N. Schlotterbeck 26', (yellow card) 75'	Stadium: WWK Arena; Attendance: 15,000; Referee: Daniel Siebert

26 February 2022 24	SC Freiburg	3–0	Hertha BSC	Freiburg
15:30 CET (UTC+1)	Grifo 12' (pen.); Höfler (yellow card) 21'; Schade 83'; Höler 86'	Report	Jovetić (yellow card) 24'; Bjørkan (yellow card) 74'	Stadium: Europa-Park Stadion; Attendance: 25,000; Referee: Sven Jablonski

5 March 2022 25	RB Leipzig	1–1	SC Freiburg	Leipzig
15:30 CET (UTC+1)	Henrichs (yellow card) 68'; Angeliño 90'	Report	Demirović 38'	Stadium: Red Bull Arena; Attendance: 24,758; Referee: Felix Zwayer

12 March 2022 26	SC Freiburg	3–2	VfL Wolfsburg	Freiburg
15:30 CET (UTC+1)	Grifo 7', 44'; N. Schlotterbeck (yellow card) 55', (goal) 87'; Haberer (yellow card) 64'	Report	Kruse 52'; Arnold 84'	Stadium: Europa-Park Stadion; Attendance: 25,000; Referee: Martin Petersen

19 March 2022 27	Greuther Fürth	0–0	SC Freiburg	Fürth
15:30 CET (UTC+1)	Viergever (yellow card) 75'	Report		Stadium: Sportpark Ronhof; Attendance: 9,884; Referee: Tobias Reichel

2 April 2022 28	SC Freiburg	1–4	Bayern Munich	Freiburg
15:30 CEST (UTC+2)	Petersen 63'; Günter (yellow card) 70'	Report	Goretzka 58'; Gnabry 73'; Coman 82'; Upamecano (yellow card) 90+3'; Sabitzer 90+6'	Stadium: Europa-Park Stadion; Attendance: 34,700; Referee: Christian Dingert

10 April 2022 29	Eintracht Frankfurt	1–2	SC Freiburg	Frankfurt
17:30 CEST (UTC+2)	Hinteregger (yellow card) 45+4'; Kostić 54'	Report	Grifo 27'; Demirović (yellow card) 45+4'; Petersen 69'; Lienhart (yellow card) 83'	Stadium: Deutsche Bank Park; Attendance: 47,000; Referee: Felix Brych

16 April 2022 30	SC Freiburg	3–0	VfL Bochum	Freiburg
15:30 CEST (UTC+2)	Kübler 5'; Sallai 16', 53'	Report	Stafylidis (red card) 68'	Stadium: Europa-Park Stadion; Attendance: 34,000; Referee: Sascha Stegemann

23 April 2022 31	SC Freiburg	3–3	Borussia Mönchengladbach	Freiburg
15:30 CEST (UTC+2)	Grifo 49' (pen.); Günter 61'; Eggestein (yellow card) 73'; Lienhart 80'	Report	Bensebaini 3' (pen.), (yellow card) 88'; Embolo 13'; Pléa (yellow card) 59'; Koné (yellow card) 65'; Stindl (yellow card) 79', (goal) 90+3'	Stadium: Europa-Park Stadion; Attendance: 34,700; Referee: Benjamin Brand

30 April 2022 32	1899 Hoffenheim	3–4	SC Freiburg	Sinsheim
18:30 CEST (UTC+2)	Kramarić 32'; Samassékou (yellow card) 45'; Stiller 49'; Rudy 85'	Report	Sallai 23'; Günter 50'; Höler 70'; Jeong 73'	Stadium: Rhein-Neckar-Arena; Attendance: 23,627; Referee: Marco Fritz

7 May 2022 33	SC Freiburg	1–4	Union Berlin	Freiburg
15:30 CEST (UTC+2)	Höler 59'; Sallai (yellow card) 67'	Report	Prömel 11'; Trimmel 30'; Becker 41'; Oczipka (yellow card) 50'; Luthe (yellow card) 69'; Schäfer 90'	Stadium: Europa-Park Stadion; Attendance: 34,700; Referee: Felix Brych

14 May 2022 34	Bayer Leverkusen	2–1	SC Freiburg	Leverkusen
15:30 CEST (UTC+2)	Diaby (yellow card) 18'; Baumgartlinger (yellow card) 26'; Alario 54'; Palacios 90+7'	Report	Eggestein (yellow card) 3'; N. Schlotterbeck (yellow card) 43'; Sildillia (yellow card) 77'; Haberer 88'	Stadium: BayArena; Attendance: 30,210; Referee: Sven Jablonski

=== DFB-Pokal ===
8 August 2021 First round	Würzburger Kickers	0–1	SC Freiburg	Würzburg
18:30 CEST (UTC+2)	Hoffmann (yellow card) 75'; Përdedaj (yellow card) 85'	Report	Schmid 45'; Höler (yellow card) 50'; Günter (yellow card) 82'	Stadium: Flyeralarm Arena; Attendance: 2,820; Referee: Benjamin Brand

26 October 2021 Second round	VfL Osnabrück	2–2 (a.e.t.) (2–3 p)	SC Freiburg	Osnabrück
20:45 CEST (UTC+2)	Köhler (yellow card) 53'; Simakala (yellow card) 86'; Kleinhansl (yellow card) 90+3'; Gugganig 90+7'; Klaas 109'	Report	Grifo 33'; Eggestein (yellow card) 34'; Kübler (yellow card) 76'; Günter (yellow card) 86'; K. Schlotterbeck 120'	Stadium: Stadion an der Bremer Brücke; Attendance: 12,000; Referee: Robert Schröder
	Penalties
	Kleinhansl (penalty missed); Klaas (penalty scored); Gugganig (penalty scored); Itter (penalty missed); Wooten (penalty missed)		(penalty missed) Höler; (penalty scored) Günter; (penalty scored) Eggestein; (penalty scored) K. Schlotterbeck; (penalty missed) Jeong

19 January 2022 Round of 16	1899 Hoffenheim	1–4	SC Freiburg	Sinsheim
20:45 CET (UTC+1)	Richards (yellow card) 32'; N. Schlotterbeck 53' (o.g.); Geiger (yellow card) 79'	Report	Grifo 10', 36' (pen.); Schade (yellow card) 27', (goal) 55'; Demirović 68'	Stadium: PreZero Arena; Attendance: 500; Referee: Robert Schröder

2 March 2022 Quarter-finals	VfL Bochum	1–2 (a.e.t.)	SC Freiburg	Bochum
20:45 CET (UTC+1)	Polter 64', (yellow card) 117'	Report	Petersen 51'; Kübler (yellow card) 117'; Sallai 120'	Stadium: Vonovia Ruhrstadion; Attendance: 10,000; Referee: Robert Schröder

19 April 2022 Semi-finals	Hamburger SV	1–3	SC Freiburg	Hamburg
20:45 CEST (UTC+2)	Meffert (yellow card) 37'; Reis (yellow card) 48'; Kaufmann (yellow card) 75'; Glatzel 88'; Heyer (yellow card) 90+1'	Report	Petersen 11'; Höfler 17', (yellow card) 63'; Grifo 35' (pen.); Günter (yellow card) 57'; Schlotterbeck (yellow card) 71'; Weißhaupt (yellow card) 90+3'	Stadium: Volksparkstadion; Attendance: 57,000; Referee: Deniz Aytekin

21 May 2022 Final	SC Freiburg	1–1 (a.e.t.) (2–4 p)	RB Leipzig	Berlin
20:00 CEST (UTC+2)	Eggestein 19'; Kübler (yellow card) 81'; Lienhart (yellow card) 90'; Demirović (yellow card) 113'	Report	Halstenberg (red card) 57'; Simakan (yellow card) 58'; Kampl (yellow card) 60' (yellow-red card) 119'; Nkunku 76'; Forsberg (yellow card) 83'	Stadium: Olympiastadion; Attendance: 74,322; Referee: Sascha Stegemann
	Penalties
	Petersen (penalty scored); Günter (penalty missed); K. Schlotterbeck (penalty scored); Demirović (penalty missed)		(penalty scored) Nkunku; (penalty scored) Orbán; (penalty scored) Olmo; (penalty scored) Henrichs

== Statistics ==
=== Appearances and goals ===
No.	Pos	Nat	Player	Total		Bundesliga		DFB-Pokal	
No.	Pos	Nat	Player	Apps	Goals	Apps	Goals	Apps	Goals
Goalkeepers
1	GK	(Germany) GER	Benjamin Uphoff	3	0	2	0	1	0
21	GK	(Germany) GER	Noah Atubolu	0	0	0	0	0	0
26	GK	(Netherlands) NED	Mark Flekken	37	0	32	0	5	0
Defenders
2	DF	(Belgium) BEL	Hugo Siquet	1	0	0+1	0	0	0
3	DF	(Austria) AUT	Philipp Lienhart	38	5	32	5	6	0
4	DF	(Germany) GER	Nico Schlotterbeck	38	4	32	4	6	0
5	DF	(Germany) GER	Manuel Gulde	25	0	14+6	0	2+3	0
7	DF	(France) FRA	Jonathan Schmid	16	1	6+7	0	2+1	1
17	DF	(Germany) GER	Lukas Kübler	33	2	27+2	2	4	0
24	DF	(Germany) GER	Kimberly Ezekwem	0	0	0	0	0	0
25	DF	(France) FRA	Kiliann Sildillia	9	0	1+6	0	0+2	0
30	DF	(Germany) GER	Christian Günter	40	2	34	2	6	0
31	DF	(Germany) GER	Keven Schlotterbeck	14	1	3+9	0	1+1	1
Midfielders
8	MF	(Germany) GER	Maximilian Eggestein	36	2	26+5	1	5	1
14	MF	(Germany) GER	Yannik Keitel	14	0	5+7	0	1+1	0
19	MF	(Germany) GER	Janik Haberer	30	3	7+19	3	1+3	0
22	MF	(Hungary) HUN	Roland Sallai	36	5	18+13	4	2+3	1
27	MF	(Germany) GER	Nicolas Höfler	35	3	30	2	5	1
32	MF	(Italy) ITA	Vincenzo Grifo	40	13	33+1	9	6	4
33	MF	(Germany) GER	Noah Weisshaupt	13	0	0+10	0	0+3	0
Forwards
9	FW	(Germany) GER	Lucas Höler	40	7	30+4	7	4+2	0
11	FW	(Bosnia and Herzegovina) BIH	Ermedin Demirović	37	3	9+22	2	2+4	1
18	FW	(Germany) GER	Nils Petersen	26	7	3+19	5	2+2	2
20	FW	(Germany) GER	Kevin Schade	24	5	7+14	4	2+1	1
29	FW	(South Korea) KOR	Jeong Woo-yeong	37	5	23+9	5	3+2	0
45	FW	(Switzerland) SUI	Nishan Burkart	0	0	0	0	0	0
48	FW	(Netherlands) NED	Vincent Vermeij	1	0	0+1	0	0	0
Players transferred out during the season
8	MF	(France) FRA	Baptiste Santamaria	2	0	0+1	0	0+1	0
23	DF	(Germany) GER	Dominique Heintz	1	0	0+1	0	0	0

Last updated: 21 May 2022
Source: Competitions

=== Goalscorers ===
Rank	Pos	No.	Nat	Name	Bundesliga	DFB-Pokal	Total
1	MF	32	(Italy)	Vincenzo Grifo	9	4	13
2	FW	9	(Germany)	Lucas Höler	7	0	7
2	FW	18	(Germany)	Nils Petersen	5	2	7
4	DF	3	(Austria)	Philipp Lienhart	5	0	5
4	FW	20	(Germany)	Kevin Schade	4	1	5
4	MF	22	(Hungary)	Roland Sallai	4	1	5
4	FW	29	(South Korea)	Jeong Woo-yeong	5	0	5
8	DF	4	(Germany)	Nico Schlotterbeck	4	0	4
9	FW	11	(Bosnia and Herzegovina)	Ermedin Demirović	2	1	3
9	MF	19	(Germany)	Janik Haberer	3	0	3
9	MF	27	(Germany)	Nicolas Höfler	2	1	3
12	MF	8	(Germany)	Maximilian Eggestein	1	1	2
12	DF	17	(Germany)	Lukas Kübler	2	0	2
12	DF	30	(Germany)	Christian Günter	2	0	2
15	DF	7	(France)	Jonathan Schmid	0	1	1
15	DF	34	(Germany)	Keven Schlotterbeck	0	1	1
Own goals					3	0	3
Totals					58	13	71

Last updated: 21 May 2022
