= Robert Wagner (footballer) =

German footballer (born 2003)

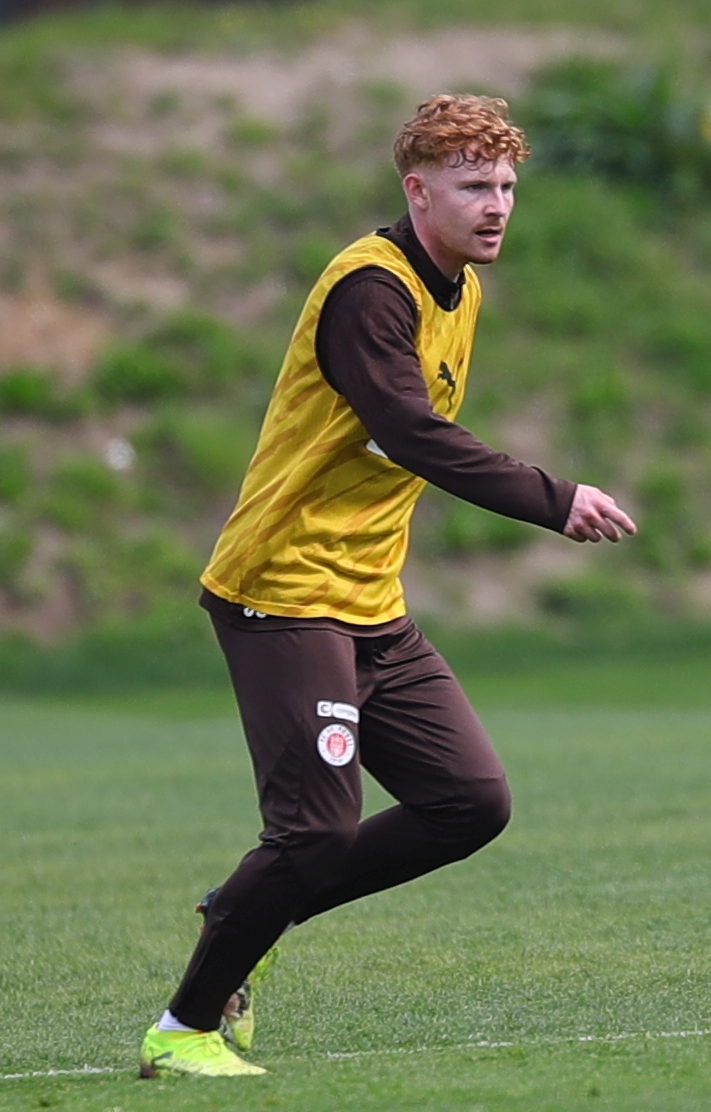
- Wagner in 2025

Personal information
- Date of birth: 14 July 2003 (age 23)
- Place of birth: Lahr, Germany
- Height: 1.81 m (5 ft 11 in)
- Position: Midfielder

Team information
- Current team: Dynamo Dresden
- Number: 18

Youth career
- 2009–2014: SC Lahr
- 2014–2015: SC Freiburg
- 2015–2017: SC Lahr
- 2017–2021: SC Freiburg

Senior career*
Years	Team	Apps	(Gls)
2021–2023	SC Freiburg II	48	(4)
2022–2026	SC Freiburg	4	(0)
2023–2024	→ Greuther Fürth (loan)	31	(4)
2024–2025	→ FC St. Pauli (loan)	12	(0)
2025	→ Holstein Kiel (loan)	14	(0)
2026	→ Dynamo Dresden (loan)	15	(0)
2026–	Dynamo Dresden	0	(0)

International career^{‡}
2021–2022	Germany U19	8	(2)
2022–2023	Germany U20	7	(1)
2023	Germany U21	3	(0)
- * Club domestic league appearances and goals as of 18 May 2026 ‡ National team caps and goals as of 13 October 2023

Robert Wagner (born 14 July 2003) is a German professional footballer who plays as a midfielder for 2. Bundesliga club Dynamo Dresden.

== Career ==
Born in Lahr, Wagner began playing football as a six-year-old with local club SC Lahr. A few years later, he briefly joined SC Freiburg before returning to SC Lahr. He re-signed with SC Freiburg at U15 level.

In the 2021–22 season Wagner made 26 appearances in the 3. Liga for SC Freiburg II, scoring twice and making two assists. In the first half of 2022 he made the first team's Bundesliga squad on four occasions. Ahead of the 2022–23 season, he trained with the first team in pre-season making his debut in a friendly against Rayo Vallecano. He was later loaned out to Greuther Fürth, FC St. Pauli and Holstein Kiel for the 2025–26 season. On 2 January 2026, he moved on a new loan to Dynamo Dresden.

== Career statistics ==
=== Club ===
As of match played 17 May 2026

Appearances and goals by club, season and competition
Club	Season	League			DFB-Pokal		Continental		Other		Total	
Club	Season	Division	Apps	Goals	Apps	Goals	Apps	Goals	Apps	Goals	Apps	Goals
SC Freiburg II	2021–22	3. Liga	27	2	—		—		—		27	2
SC Freiburg II	2022–23	3. Liga	21	2	—		—		—		21	2
SC Freiburg II	Total		48	4	—		—		—		48	4
SC Freiburg	2021–22	Bundesliga	0	0	0	0	—		—		0	0
SC Freiburg	2022–23	Bundesliga	4	0	0	0	1 (Note: Appearance(s) in UEFA Europa League)	0	—		5	0
SC Freiburg	Total		4	0	0	0	1	0	—		5	0
Greuther Fürth (loan)	2023–24	2. Bundesliga	31	4	1	0	—		—		32	4
FC St. Pauli (loan)	2024–25	Bundesliga	12	0	2	0	—		—		14	0
Holstein Kiel (loan)	2025–26	2. Bundesliga	14	0	2	0	—		—		16	0
Dynamo Dresden (loan)	2025–26	2. Bundesliga	15	0	—		—		—		15	0
Dynamo Dresden	2026–27	2. Bundesliga	0	0	0	0	—		—		0	0
Career total			124	8	5	0	1	0	—		130	8

== Honours ==
Individual

- Fritz Walter Medal U19 Bronze: 2022
