= Freiburg Airport =

Aerodrome in Germany

Freiburg Airport Flugplatz Freiburg
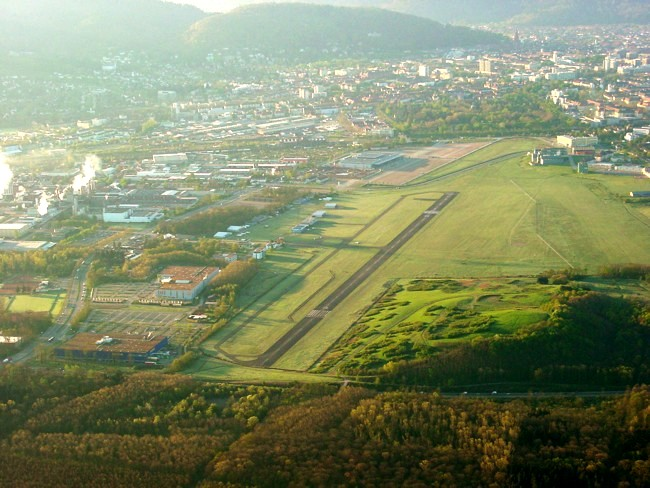
- IATA: none; ICAO: EDTF

Summary
- Operator: Flugplatz Freiburg-Breisgau GmbH
- Location: Freiburg, Germany
- Elevation AMSL: 243 m (797 ft)
- Coordinates: 48°01′21.55″N 7°49′57.30″E
- Website: freiburg-airport.de

Map
- Location of airport in Germany

Runways
Direction	Length		Surface
Direction	ft	m	Surface
16/34	4,590	1,400	Asphalt
- Source: Information for pilots

Freiburg Airport is an airport situated in the northwestern part of Freiburg, in the southwest of Germany. It is one of the oldest aerodromes in Germany. The airport is approved for powered aircraft, motor gliders, helicopters, gliders, hot air balloons, for parachuting and under certain restrictions also for ultralight aircraft and gyrocopters. In addition, it is the base of Christoph 54, the emergency rescue and intensive care helicopter of the DRF Luftrettung, which is part of the German air medical services.

It is used for private and commercial purposes. Among those are flights for exhibitors and visitors of the Messe Freiburg, for guests on TV-Shows or sporting events, and also for the transport of organs of the university hospital. The EuroAirport Basel Mulhouse Freiburg, which is situated 46 km away from Freiburg, is used for international commercial flights.

== History ==
The aerodrome was established on the site of a military parade ground in the northwest of the city, in the district of Brühl. A balloon flight over the soon-to-be aerodrome in 1907 can be referred to as the first instance of flight operations in Freiburg.

In the 1930s, as the airfield was predominantly used for military purposes, the airport reached its heyday. This was due in particular to the Lufthansa operating regular flights to Stuttgart as of 5 July 1926 and to Constance as of 2 July 1930.

After the end of WWII, the aerodrome was used by French occupation forces for several decades.

At the end of the 1960s the airport’s future was uncertain. Opponents of the airport wanted to use the area for housing development and denounced the noise of the French Army Aviation. In 1974 the city council unanimously voted in favour of the preservation and expansion of the airport.

After long discussions about closing the airport, its existence is no longer at risk. This is due in part to the strong support it received from the citizens of Freiburg during the local referendum of 1995 and to the aerodrome’s importance for the local economy and the Messe Freiburg. The decisive factor was and still is the importance of the airfield for the Heart and Lung Centers of the University Medical Center Freiburg. The airfield is situated in the immediate surroundings of the hospital and is used for the air transport of organs in the European catchment area. Freiburg Airport therefore has an unrestricted night flight permission for air transport of organs.

Due to new, stricter EU legislation (council ordinance (EEC) No. 3922/91 of 16 December 1991 on the harmonization of technical regulations and administrative procedures in civil aviation), only small or light aircraft were able to land on the existing runway as of 2005, which also affected organ transplant flights for the Freiburg-University-Hospital. In 2006 the city council of Freiburg decided to extend the runway in accordance with the ordinance. The runway was finally extended to 1400 meters in 2011 and PAPI approach aids were installed on the landing thresholds.

Two petitions opposing the expansion failed to halt the new development. As part of the Pope’s visit to Germany in 2011, Benedict XVI celebrated a large closing service with 100,000 people on the western area of the airfield on September 25, 2011.

In 2013 the airfield was brought up to discussion once again because of a planned football stadium — the new home of SC Freiburg; however, the location in question for the new stadium is further west from the hardsurfaced runway and does not affect flight operations, according to preliminary expert reports. In November 2014, the municipal council decided with a clear majority that the SC-Stadion should be built there, although more detailed reports on flight safety have not yet been completed. On February 1, 2015, the citizens of Freiburg voted in a referendum with 58.2 percent in favor of the new stadium in Wolfswinkel. Sports like skydiving and gliding would then lose their current operating areas. According to the preliminary report, despite the stadium’s location near the hardsurfaced runway, even in adverse wind conditions, there will be no significant restrictions on pure powered flight operations. The new stadium opened in October 2021.

In 2017, it became known that an application had been submitted to German Air Traffic Control for Freiburg Airport to also be approached by instrument approach, which had not yet been decided at the beginning of 2020. There are efforts to allow aircraft heavier than 10 tons to land, especially with regard to football teams for the to be opened SC-Stadion. Larger aircraft, however, belong to a higher fire protection category and this accordingly requires a certain number of fire trucks and personnel. The airfield company purchased a used fire truck in 2019. This is a swap-body truck equipped with a permanently mounted AB-Lösch, which allows it to be used as an airfield firefighting vehicle FLF 40/80-6. This had been approved by the supervisory board with numerous city councils. Therefore, with PPR, aircraft over 10 tons can land. In 2019, five aircraft over 5.7 tons were handled as well as two jets over 10 tons. The airport is used for business, private and organ flights. About 5400 aircraft take off annually, 96 percent are lighter than 2 tons. In early 2020, there was a push in the city council to close the airfield: By a narrow majority, the city council was asked to determine how expensive it would be to close it in 2031, when the lease expires.

== Operator and financing ==
The operator of the airfield is Flugplatz Freiburg-Breisgau GmbH, a 100% subsidiary of Stadtwerke Freiburg GmbH. The revenue of the airfield is inherited, among other things, from landing fees. Nevertheless, Flugplatz Freiburg-Breisgau GmbH makes an annual loss of a substantial five-digit amount, which is compensated by municipal funds. The only exception was the year 2012, when a profit of 33,000 euros was reported due to the reversal of provisions. In 2017, Flugplatz Freiburg-Breisgau GmbH employed 15 people, including three full-time flight controllers.
