= Bruno Ogbus =

Swiss footballer (born 2005)

Personal information
- Full name: Bruno Ifechukwu Ogbus
- Date of birth: 17 December 2005 (age 20)
- Place of birth: Neunkirch, Switzerland
- Height: 1.85 m (6 ft 1 in)
- Position: Right-back

Team information
- Current team: SC Freiburg
- Number: 43

Youth career
- Grasshopper
- 2022–2023: SC Freiburg

Senior career*
Years	Team	Apps	(Gls)
2023–	SC Freiburg II	26	(0)
2024–	SC Freiburg	20	(0)

International career^{‡}
2022	Switzerland U17	3	(0)
2023	Switzerland U18	5	(0)
2023–2024	Switzerland U19	8	(1)
2024	Switzerland U20	5	(0)
2024–	Switzerland U21	8	(0)
- * Club domestic league appearances and goals as of 16 May 2026 ‡ National team caps and goals as of 31 March 2026

Bruno Ifechukwu Ogbus (born 17 December 2005) is a Swiss professional footballer who plays as a right-back for Bundesliga club SC Freiburg

== Club career ==
Ogbus is a youth product of the Swiss club Grasshopper, before moving to the youth academy of SC Freiburg on 23 January 2022. He was promoted to SC Freiburg II in 2023, and started training with the first team. He made his senior and professional debut with Freiburg in a 4–0 DFB Pokal win over Osnabrück on 17 August 2024, and assisted his side's first goal.

== International career ==
Born in Switzerland, Ogbus is of Nigerian descent. He is a youth international for Switzerland, having played up to the Switzerland U20s.

== Career statistics ==
=== Club ===
As of match played 27 August 2026

Appearances and goals by club, season and competition
Club	Season	League			Cup		Europe		Total	
Club	Season	Division	Apps	Goals	Apps	Goals	Apps	Goals	Apps	Goals
SC Freiburg II	2023–24	3. Liga	9	0	—		—		9	0
SC Freiburg II	2024–25	Regionalliga Südwest	4	0	—		—		4	0
SC Freiburg II	2025–26	Regionalliga Südwest	13	0	—		—		13	0
SC Freiburg II	Total		26	0	—		—		26	0
SC Freiburg	2024–25	Bundesliga	2	0	1	0	0	0	3	0
SC Freiburg	2025–26	Bundesliga	18	0	1	0	5 (Note: Appearances in UEFA Europa League)	0	24	0
SC Freiburg	2026–27	Bundesliga	0	0	0	0	1 (Note: Appearances in UEFA Conference League)	0	1	0
SC Freiburg	Total		20	0	2	0	6	0	28	0
Career total			45	0	2	0	6	0	53	0

== Honours ==
SC Freiburg

- UEFA Europa League runner-up: 2025–26
