= Florian Kleinhansl =

German footballer

Personal information
- Date of birth: 11 August 2000 (age 26)
- Place of birth: Nürtingen, Germany
- Height: 1.80 m (5 ft 11 in)
- Position: Left-back

Team information
- Current team: Darmstadt 98
- Number: 3

Youth career
- TSG Reutlingen
- Stuttgarter Kickers
- 2018–2019: VfB Stuttgart

Senior career*
Years	Team	Apps	(Gls)
2019–2021	VfB Stuttgart II	47	(1)
2021–2024	VfL Osnabrück	106	(5)
2024–2026	1. FC Kaiserslautern	32	(0)
2026–	Darmstadt 98	0	(0)

International career^{‡}
2017	Germany U18	2	(0)
- * Club domestic league appearances and goals as of 18 May 2026 ‡ National team caps and goals as of 16:13, 6 August 2021 (UTC)

Florian Kleinhansl (born 11 August 2000) is a German professional footballer who plays as a left-back for 2. Bundesliga club Darmstadt 98.

== Club career ==
Born in Nürtingen, Kleinhansl played youth football for TSG Reutlingen, Stuttgarter Kickers and VfB Stuttgart before making his senior debut for VfB Stuttgart II in August 2019. In July 2021, Kleinhansl signed for 3. Liga club VfL Osnabrück, with both the transfer fee and the contract length remaining undisclosed.

Kleinhansl joined 1. FC Kaiserslautern on a free transfer in July 2024.

On 15 July 2026, Kleinhansl signed with Darmstadt 98.

== International career ==
Kleinhansl has represented Germany internationally at under-18 level.

== Career statistics ==
As of match played on 21 April 2023

Appearances and goals by club, season and competition
Club	Season	League			National cup		Other		Total	
Club	Season	Division	Apps	Goals	Apps	Goals	Apps	Goals	Apps	Goals
VfB Stuttgart II	2019–20	Oberliga Baden-Württemberg	20	1	—		4 (Note: Appearances in the Württemberg Cup)	1	24	2
VfB Stuttgart II	2020–21	Regionalliga Südwest	27	0	—		—		27	0
VfB Stuttgart II	Total		47	1	0	0	4	0	51	2
VfL Osnabrück	2021–22	3. Liga	36	1	2	0	2 (Note: Appearances in the Lower Saxony Cup)	0	40	1
VfL Osnabrück	2022–23	3. Liga	32	2	0	0	1	0	33	2
VfL Osnabrück	Total		68	3	2	0	3	0	73	3
Career total			115	4	2	0	7	1	124	5
