= Hugo Siquet =

Belgian footballer (born 2002)

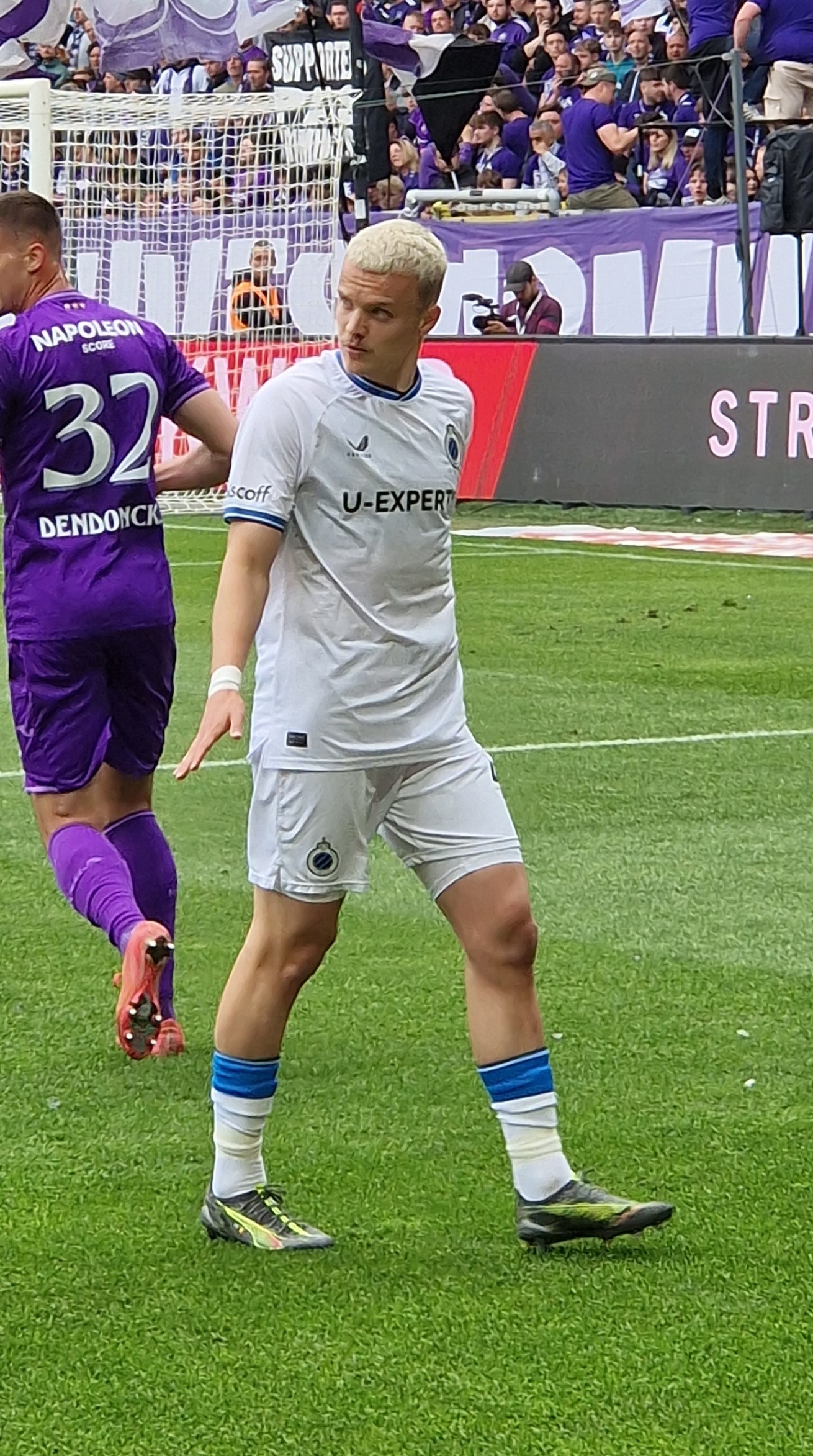
- Siquet for Club Brugge in 2025

Personal information
- Full name: Hugo Thierry Siquet
- Date of birth: 9 July 2002 (age 24)
- Place of birth: Marche-en-Famenne, Belgium
- Height: 1.80 m (5 ft 11 in)
- Position: Right-back

Team information
- Current team: Club Brugge
- Number: 41

Youth career
- 2009–2020: Standard Liège

Senior career*
| Years | Team | Apps | (Gls) |
| 2020–2022 | Standard Liège | 37 | (0) |
| 2022–2024 | SC Freiburg | 3 | (0) |
| 2022–2024 | SC Freiburg II | 6 | (1) |
| 2023–2024 | → Cercle Brugge (loan) | 50 | (2) |
| 2024– | Club Brugge | 56 | (2) |

International career^{‡}
| 2018–2019 | Belgium U17 | 10 | (1) |
| 2019 | Belgium U18 | 2 | (0) |
| 2022 | Belgium U20 | 1 | (0) |
| 2021–2024 | Belgium U21 | 24 | (0) |
| 2023– | Belgium | 1 | (0) |
- * Club domestic league appearances and goals as of 31 October 2026 ‡ National team caps and goals as of 18:29, 30 November 2024 (UTC)

Hugo Thierry Siquet (born 9 July 2002) is a Belgian professional footballer who plays as a right-back for Club Brugge and the Belgium national team.

== Club career ==
On 20 July 2020, Siquet signed his first professional contract with Standard Liège. He made his professional debut with Standard Liège in a 3–1 UEFA Europa League loss to Lech Poznań on 5 November 2020.

In early December 2021, it was announced that Siquet would join Bundesliga club SC Freiburg for the second half of the 2021–22 season. Standard Liège was reportedly paid €4.5 million as transfer fee.

On 14 January 2023, Siquet joined Belgian Pro League club Cercle Brugge on loan until the end of the 2022–23 season, with an option for the 2023–24 season.

On 23 July 2024, Siquet signed a four-year contract with Club Brugge.

== International career ==
In September 2023, Siquet received his first call-up to the Belgium senior national team by head coach Domenico Tedesco, for the UEFA Euro 2024 qualifying matches against Azerbaijan and Estonia.

== Personal life ==
Hugo is the nephew of former footballer Thierry Siquet.

== Career statistics ==
=== Club ===
As of match played 31 October 2026

Appearances and goals by club, season and competition
| Club | Season | League | | | Cup | | Europe | | Other | | Total | |
| Club | Season | Division | Apps | Goals | Apps | Goals | Apps | Goals | Apps | Goals | Apps | Goals |
|---|---|---|---|---|---|---|---|---|---|---|---|---|
| Standard Liège | 2020–21 | Belgian Pro League | 20 | 0 | 5 | 0 | 1 (Note: Appearances in UEFA Europa League) | 0 | 0 | 0 | 26 | 0 |
| Standard Liège | 2021–22 | Belgian Pro League | 17 | 0 | 0 | 0 | 0 | 0 | — | | 17 | 0 |
| Standard Liège | Total | | 37 | 0 | 5 | 0 | 1 | 0 | 0 | 0 | 43 | 0 |
| SC Freiburg II | 2021–22 | 3. Liga | 4 | 1 | — | | — | | — | | 4 | 1 |
| SC Freiburg II | 2022–23 | 3. Liga | 2 | 0 | — | | — | | — | | 2 | 0 |
| SC Freiburg II | Total | | 6 | 1 | — | | — | | — | | 6 | 1 |
| SC Freiburg | 2021–22 | Bundesliga | 1 | 0 | 0 | 0 | 0 | 0 | — | | 1 | 0 |
| SC Freiburg | 2022–23 | Bundesliga | 2 | 0 | 0 | 0 | 1 | 0 | — | | 3 | 0 |
| SC Freiburg | Total | | 3 | 0 | 0 | 0 | 1 | 0 | — | | 4 | 0 |
| Cercle Brugge | 2022–23 | Belgian Pro League | 20 | 2 | — | | — | | — | | 20 | 2 |
| Cercle Brugge | 2023–24 | Belgian Pro League | 30 | 0 | 1 | 0 | — | | — | | 31 | 0 |
| Cercle Brugge | Total | | 50 | 2 | 1 | 0 | — | | — | | 51 | 2 |
| Club Brugge | 2024–25 | Belgian Pro League | 21 | 2 | 3 | 0 | 4 (Note: Appearances in UEFA Champions League) | 0 | — | | 28 | 2 |
| Club Brugge | 2025–26 | Belgian Pro League | 29 | 0 | 2 | 0 | 9 | 0 | 0 | 0 | 40 | 0 |
| Club Brugge | 2026–27 | Belgian Pro League | 6 | 0 | 1 | 0 | 3 | 0 | 1 (Note: Appearance in Belgian Super Cup) | 0 | 11 | 0 |
| Club Brugge | Total | | 56 | 2 | 6 | 0 | 16 | 0 | 1 | 0 | 79 | 2 |
| Club NXT | 2024–25 | Challenger Pro League | 1 | 1 | — | | — | | — | | 1 | 1 |
| Career total | | | 136 | 6 | 12 | 0 | 18 | 0 | 1 | 0 | 167 | 6 |

=== International ===
As of match played 12 September 2023

Appearances and goals by national team and year
| National team | Year | Apps | Goals |
|---|---|---|---|
| Belgium | 2023 | 1 | 0 |
| Total | | 1 | 0 |

== Honours ==
Club Brugge

- Belgian Cup: 2024–25

Individual

- Dominique D'Onofrio Award: 2021
