= Kimberly Ezekwem =

German footballer

Personal information
- Full name: Kimberly Chiwetalu Akwaeze Ezekwem
- Date of birth: 19 June 2001 (age 25)
- Place of birth: Munich, Germany
- Height: 1.87 m (6 ft 2 in)
- Position: Centre-back

Team information
- Current team: Karlsruher SC II
- Number: 17

Youth career
- –2018: Bayern Munich
- 2018–: SC Freiburg

Senior career*
Years	Team	Apps	(Gls)
2020–2026	SC Freiburg II	68	(0)
2022–2026	SC Freiburg	1	(0)
2023–2024	→ SC Paderborn (loan)	7	(0)
2026–	Karlsruher SC II	7	(0)
- * Club domestic league appearances and goals as of 27 September 2026

Kimberly Ezekwem (born 19 June 2001) is a German professional footballer who plays as a centre-back for Oberliga Baden-Württemberg club Karlsruher SC II.

== Career ==
Ezekwem made his Bundesliga debut for SC Freiburg on 6 May 2023, coming on as a late substitute in a 1–0 defeat to RB Leipzig.

On 16 June 2023, Ezekwem signed for 2. Bundesliga club SC Paderborn on a season-long loan deal.

== Personal life ==
He is of Nigerian descent.

== Career statistics ==
As of 10 August 2021

Appearances and goals by club, season and competition
Club	Season	League			Cup		Continental		Other		Total	
Club	Season	Division	Apps	Goals	Apps	Goals	Apps	Goals	Apps	Goals	Apps	Goals
SC Freiburg II	2020–21	Regionalliga	37	0	–		–		0	0	37	0
SC Freiburg II	2021–22	3. Liga	2	0	–		–		0	0	2	0
Career total			39	0	0	0	0	0	0	0	39	0
