= Europa-Park Stadion =

Football stadium in Freiburg, Germany

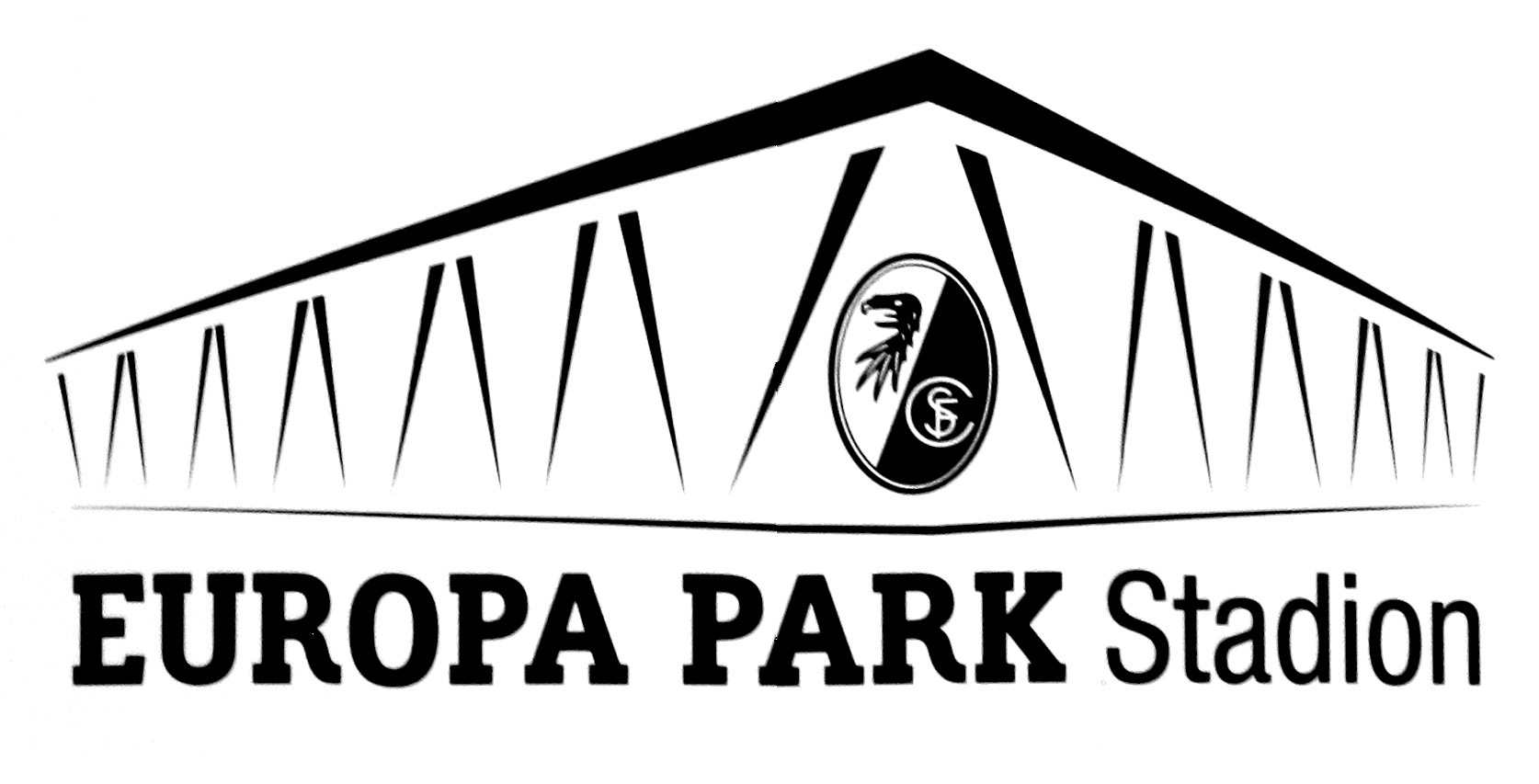

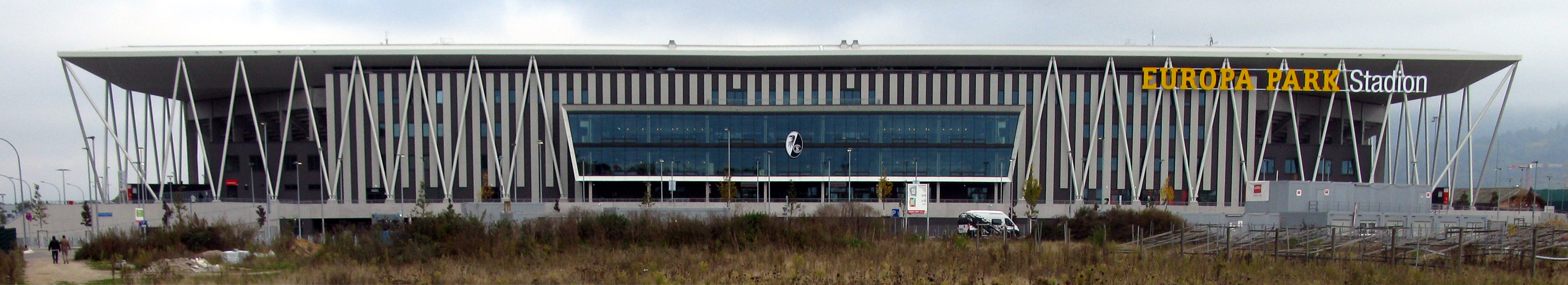
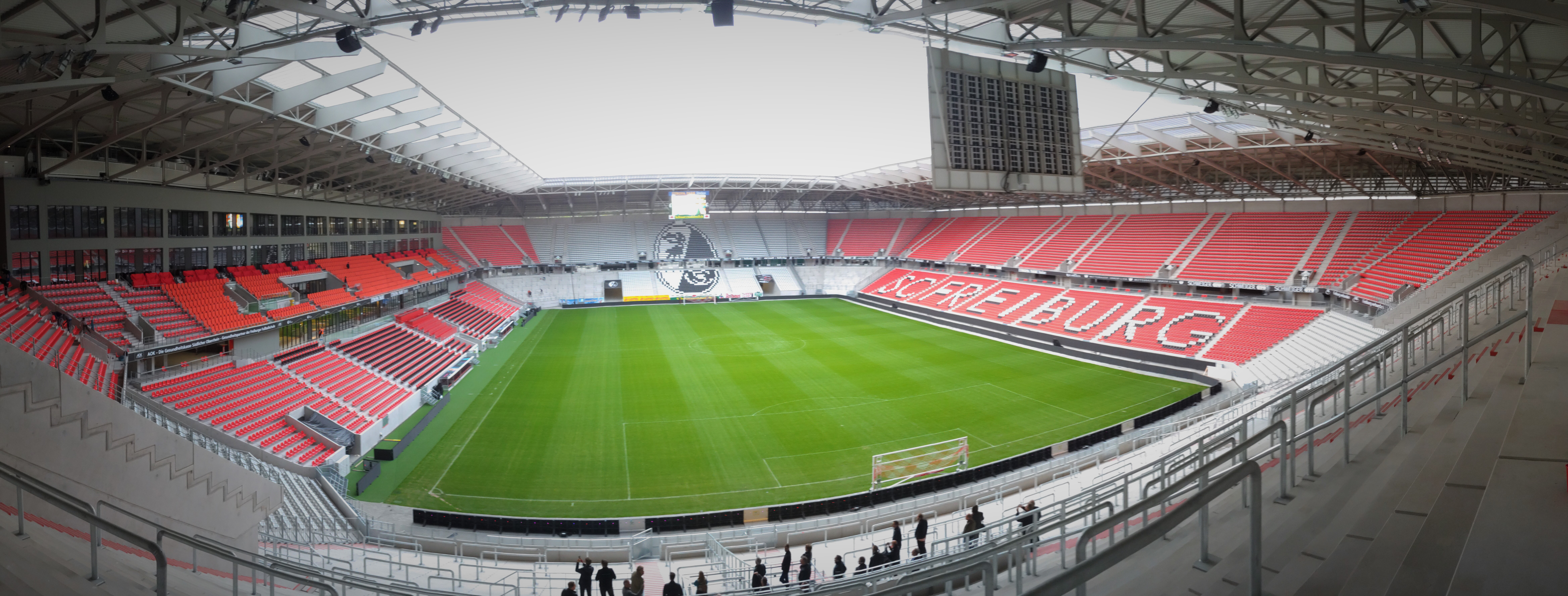
- Interactive map of Europa-Park Stadion
- Former names: SC-Stadion (2021)
- Location: Freiburg im Breisgau, Germany
- Coordinates: 48.0216°N 7.8297°E
- Owner: City of Freiburg
- Capacity: 34,700
- Surface: Grass

Construction
- Groundbreaking: November 2018
- Opened: 7 October 2021
- Architect: HPP Architekten

Tenants
- SC Freiburg (2021–present); Germany national football team (selected matches)

Europa-Park Stadion, also known as the Mooswald-Stadion (German pronunciation: [ˈmoːswaltˌʃtaːdi̯ɔn]), is a stadium in Freiburg im Breisgau, Germany, that serves mainly as the home of football club SC Freiburg, replacing the Dreisamstadion in this role. It lies in a part of the city called Brühl, just west of Freiburg Airport. The stadium is known as the Stadion am Wolfswinkel in UEFA competitions.

== Stadium characteristics ==
According to the building plans made by Düsseldorf-based architect group, HPP Architekten, the stadium has continuous upper and lower tiers, with the home stand behind the goal on the south side. It has a capacity of 34,700 seats, 36% (around 12,400) of them being standing only. The stadium is 25 metres high and is rectangular. In addition to the offices, function rooms for the first team and the U23s will be integrated.

== History ==
The stadium used by SC Freiburg up until 2021, the Dreisamstadion, opened in 1954, no longer meets the requirements of a modern stadium due to a pitch that is too small, 100.5 m × 68 m (330 ft × 223 ft), and also a gradient of 98 centimetres (39 in) from the goal in the south to the goal in the north towards the Dreisam. It is only allowed to be continuously used because of a special permit issued by the DFL. For some time now, there have been discussions about a rebuilding of the stadium or a new construction. In order to examine the economic viability of converting the Dreisamstadion, the club commissioned a study from Freyler, according to which a conversion would take eleven years and cost only slightly less than a new building.

The Freiburg local councils ordered an assessment report from the auditing company Ernst & Young in the spring of 2012. The report described a conversion time of only three years, but calculated far superior costs. According to the report, there was no viable solution on the old site. This led to the assessment and comparison of further locations. In December 2012, the Freiburg city council voted in favour of the construction of a new stadium and confirmed the assessment of three possible locations. The joint task force of club and city agreed on the Wolfswinkel location next to the airfield and the university engineering faculty building in the district of Brühl. The advantages of the site are the good transport connections and the possibility to set up training grounds in the surrounding area. With the exception of 200 m^{2} which belong to the university, the site belongs to the city. The Hettlinger allotment gardens near the Messe in the western part of Freiburg and the Hirschmatten plot of land near the motorway feeder road, which had been taken into consideration as possible alternative construction sites for the stadium, were deemed less suitable in a decision by the Freiburg city council on 25 January 2014.

On 1 February 2015, the residents of Freiburg voted in favour of the construction of the new stadium in Wolfswinkel with 58.2 percent of the votes. The budget amounts to €76 million. The club obtained the building permit for the construction of a new stadium on the Wolfswinkel site on 16 November 2018. The same month, preparatory construction work started.

The stadium was initially scheduled to be completed in August 2020 with the beginning of the 2020–21 season. In April 2020, SC CFO Oliver Leki disclosed in an interview with Kicker, a German sports magazine, that this original date would not be met due to the effects of the COVID-19 pandemic. For this reason the Dreisamstadion was specified as a venue in addition to the SC-Stadion for club licensing in the 2020–21 season. In July 2020, it was publicly announced that the stadium would probably not be ready until the end of 2020 and that the Sport-Club could possibly move to the new stadium after the winter break. Freiburg finally moved into the new stadium after playing the first three home games of the 2021–22 season in their old stadium, their first game in the stadium being against RB Leipzig.

At the end of 2019, the foot and bike path bridge over the new access road to the stadium (Suwonallee) on Granadaallee was opened. The remaining construction work is going according to schedule, but there is no time buffer anymore.

The construction of the roof structure began in early 2020. To ensure that everyday traffic would not be disturbed, all of the roof elements were transported to Freiburg at night by heavy load transport. On 5 March 2020, the topping out ceremony was held on the site. The SC team then made a quick tour of the construction site.

In the beginning of autumn in 2020, construction work was completed after about 18 months. On 2 October, the most important access road – Suwonallee (named after the South Korean twin town Suwon) – was opened to traffic. The road runs between the stadium's training area and the landing strip of the adjoining Freiburg Airport (EDTF). It connects Madisonallee and Granadaallee.

Furthermore, the works include foot and bike paths, a boulevard leading to the stadium, a parking space for bikes and cars, as well as a large bus station. The previously completed road surrounding the stadium is named after the long-time club president, Achim Stocker (1935–2009). It currently serves as an access road for the adjacent university construction works. It is to be officially opened to the public at a later stage. The stadium's turf was rolled out on 25 November 2020.

== Panorama photograph ==
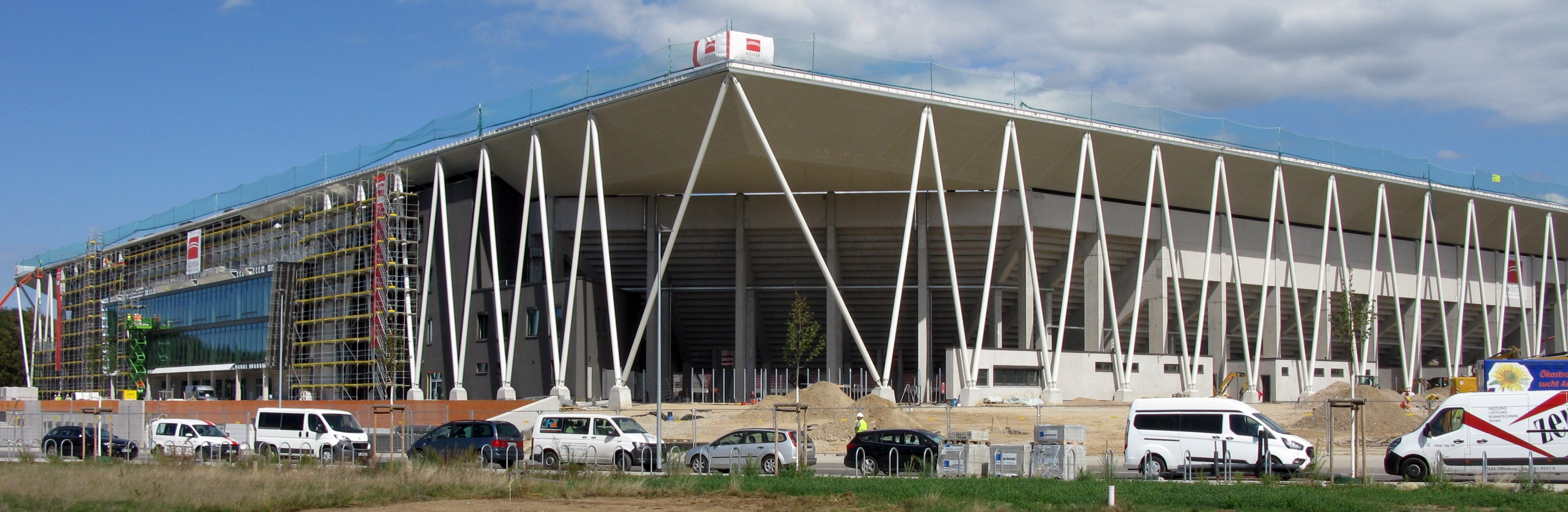
Building site of the stadium as of 7 September 2021

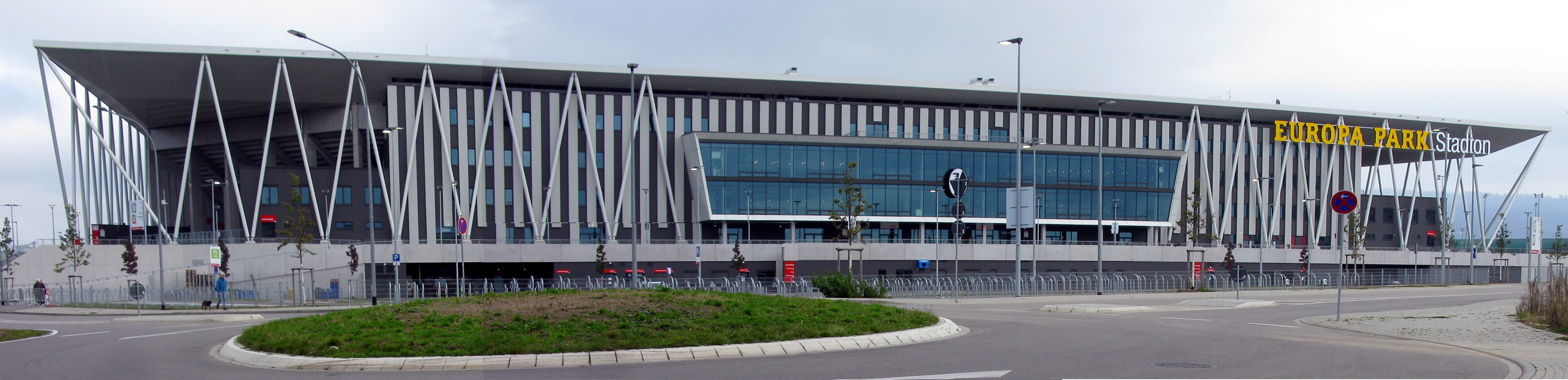
Finished stadium as of 17 October 2021

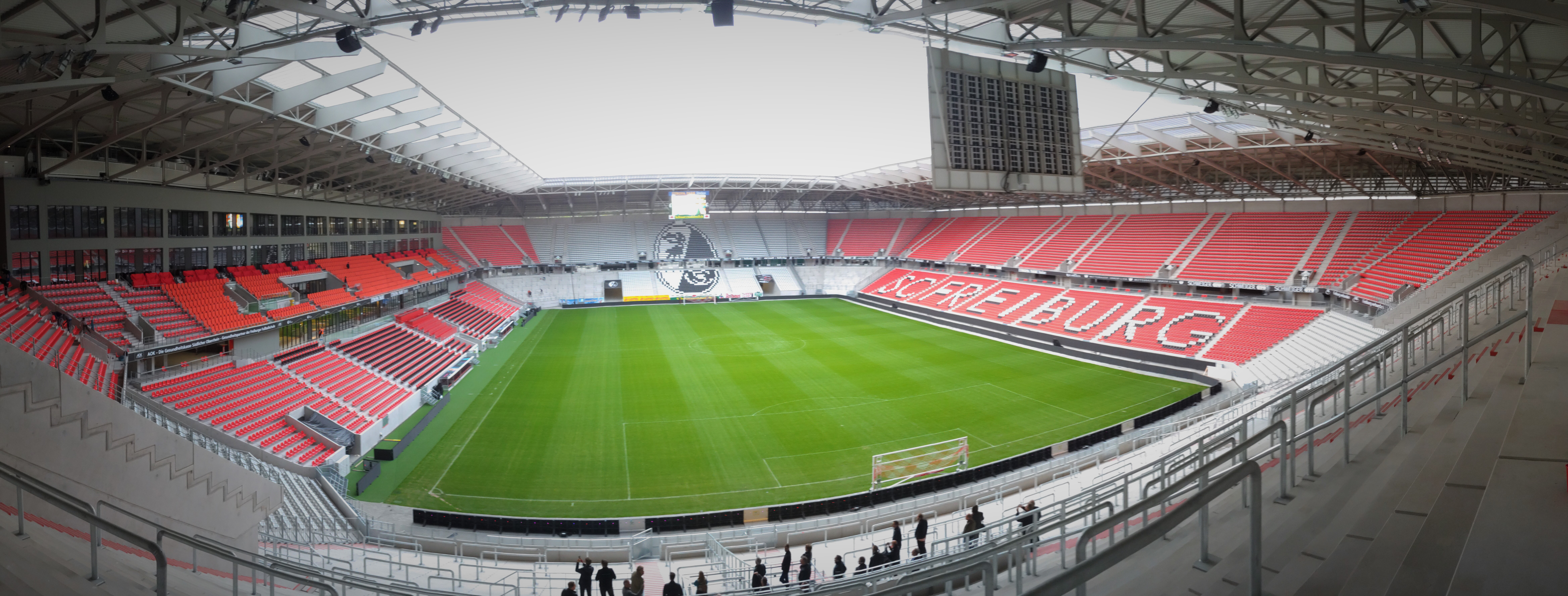
Inside view of the Stadium in October 2021

== Legal issues ==
In May 2019, the administrative court of Freiburg had rejected an appeal for construction to stop, in summary proceedings brought up by five women and one man (represented by a Karlsruhe law firm), who live between around 430 and 740 meters from the westernmost edge of the stadium. The six plaintiffs had filed an appeal against this decision in June. The Freiburg glider pilots, on the other hand, withdrew their complaint against the stadium because they received a new grass runway in 2019.

On 2 October 2019, the administrative court of Baden-Württemberg ruled that comparatively high noise protection standards must be met for the use of the stadium. This means that no match is allowed to last longer than 8 p.m. throughout the week and, in addition, no match may be played between 1 p.m. and 3 p.m. on Sundays. Different rules apply to non-sporting events. The ruling received attention nationwide and in the United Kingdom. A few hours after the ruling was published on 23 October 2019, it became known that the court had based the ruling on outdated noise limits, that had been valid only until the year of 2017.

On 20 May 2020, the administrative court fully granted the complaint issued by the state of Baden-Württemberg seeking remedy for a violation of the right to be heard. The complaint concerned the admission of matches in the new SC-Stadium. Thus, the decision from 23 October 2019 was rendered invalid and the issue will be discussed anew. In mid-September 2020, the administrative court ruled in summary proceedings that Bundesliga matches may not take place after 8 p.m. as well as not between 1 and 3 p.m. on Sundays. If the sports club were to make it to the Europa or Champions League, it would be allowed to play at night however, since the matches would be considered "rare events" for which different conditions apply. The same applies to matches of the DFB-Pokal. Even though the main proceedings are still to be held, SC Freiburg proceeds on the assumption that with the current limits in force they can use the ground without restrictions. Following a change in national sporting regulations in 2021, Freiburg are allowed to play up to 18 games a year at night.

== Ownership and financing ==
The stadium's proprietor is the "Stadion Freiburg Objektträger GmbH & Co. KG", whose shares are 100% holdings of the city of Freiburg. The city rendered the property as a contribution in kind to the company. The SC Freiburg, as an atypical silent partner, rendered a capital contribution of at least 15 million euros, which will be raised by one million euros with each year they spend in the Bundesliga with a limit of 20 million euros. As a third participator, the silent partnership of the state-owned brewery Rothaus, which was established at the Freiburg Trade Fair, was set to result in a contribution of 12.78 million euros. The Ministry of education, youth and sports of the state of Baden-Württemberg subsidized the stadium with an amount of 16.2 million euros. The remaining 32.7 million euros were to be financed externally through loans. In July 2018, it became public that Rothaus would back out of the financing and that the SC Freiburg would cover their share and finance it with a loan.

After completing the construction, the corporation will lease the stadium to the SC Freiburg who will pay an annual lease up to 3.8 million euros in the Bundesliga and an annual lease up to 2.8 million euros in the 2. Bundesliga.

On 31 August 2021, it was announced that the naming rights for the stadium were sold to Europa-Park for an undisclosed fee. The stadium was renamed from the placeholder's name SC-Stadion to Europa-Park Stadion when SC Freiburg moved in.

== Compensatory measures ==
Measures were taken to compensate for the space lost due to the construction of the arena, the areas constructed for traffic, and the training facilities. This includes a 70-hectare wide area for which the city pays around 10 million euros. About 10 hectares of calcareous grassland were lost because of the construction. Due to its high valency, the compensating area has to be 16 hectares. The following places were chosen for this compensation: 8 hectares at the former waste disposal site Eichelbuck, 5.3 hectare at the airfield Bremgarten, 1.5 hectare at the Tuniberg, and 1.2 hectare at the northern airfield. Planning these measures had already started partially when the referendum of 2015 took place. In July 2019, 4 hectares of calcareous grassland had already been established at the Eichelbuck. This measure is planned to be finished by 2021. Pieces of turf and seeds have been extracted from their former biotopes at the stadium site and were brought to the Eichelbuck and replanted there, so that the typical flora and fauna could resettle at the compensatory site. An investigation in 2018 showed that just a few months after the resettlement, the flora and fauna at the Eichelbuck started to show great similarities to the biotopes at the airfield.

In order to maintain this success, amongst other things, the grass needs to be mowed several times in the summer. The compensatory measures at the northern airfield and the airfield Bremgarten have already been completed. Parts of the former taxiway at the airfield Bremgarten have been removed.

Extensive grazing with cattle on a meadow near the renatured Elz river close to Köndringen is another measure which, at the same time, enhances the meadow for jackdaws.

== Connection to the airfield ==
In the future, larger aircraft will be able to land at the neighboring airfield. The operator is already working on getting an official approval. For this reason, a new fire engine has been purchased by the airfield's operators. If approval is given, the visiting teams' aircraft could land next to the stadium.

== See also ==
- List of football stadiums in Germany
- List of European stadiums by capacity
- Lists of stadiums
