= Switzerland national football team results (2020–present) =

- Win Draw Loss

This article provides details of international football games played by the Switzerland national football team from 2020 to present.

== Results ==
Key
Win
Draw
Defeat

=== 2020 ===
26 March 2020 Qatar Airways Tournament	Croatia	Cancelled	Switzerland	Al Rayyan, Qatar

30 March 2020 Qatar Airways Tournament	Belgium	Cancelled	Switzerland	Al Rayyan, Qatar

31 May 2020 Friendly	Switzerland	Cancelled	Germany

3 September 2020 2020–21 Nations League	Ukraine	2–1	Switzerland	Lviv, Ukraine
21:45 UTC+3	Yarmolenko 14'; Zinchenko 68'	Report	Seferovic 41'	Stadium: Arena Lviv; Attendance: 0 (Note: Due to the COVID-19 pandemic in Europe, all matches scheduled for September 2020 were played behind closed doors.); Referee: Andreas Ekberg (Sweden)

6 September 2020 2020–21 Nations League	Switzerland	1–1	Germany	Basel, Switzerland
20:45 UTC+2	Widmer 58'	Report	Gündoğan 14'	Stadium: St. Jakob-Park; Attendance: 0 Referee: Michael Oliver (England)

7 October 2020 Friendly	Switzerland	1–2	Croatia	St. Gallen, Switzerland
20:45 UTC+2	Gavranović 31'	Report	Brekalo 42'; Pašalić 67'	Stadium: Kybunpark; Attendance: 4,500; Referee: Tiago Martins (Portugal)

10 October 2020 2020–21 Nations League	Spain	1–0	Switzerland	Madrid, Spain
20:45 UTC+2	Oyarzabal 14'	Report		Stadium: Alfredo di Stéfano; Attendance: 0 (Note: Due to the COVID-19 pandemic in Spain, Spain played their home match behind closed doors.); Referee: Ali Palabıyık (Turkey)

13 October 2020 2020–21 Nations League	Germany	3–3	Switzerland	Cologne, Germany
20:45 UTC+2	Werner 28'; Havertz 55'; Gnabry 60'	Report	Gavranović 5', 57'; Freuler 26'	Stadium: RheinEnergieStadion; Attendance: 0 (Note: Due to the COVID-19 pandemic in Europe, the match was played behind closed doors.); Referee: Ruddy Buquet (France)

11 November 2020 Friendly	Belgium	2–1	Switzerland	Leuven, Belgium
20:45 UTC+1	Batshuayi 49', 70'	Report	Mehmedi 12'	Stadium: Den Dreef; Attendance: 0 Referee: Jérôme Brisard (France)

14 November 2020 2020–21 Nations League	Switzerland	1–1	Spain	Basel, Switzerland
20:45 UTC+1	Freuler 26'	Report	Gerard 89'	Stadium: St. Jakob-Park; Attendance: 0 Referee: Willie Collum (Scotland)

17 November 2020 2020–21 Nations League	Switzerland	3–0 (Awarded)	Ukraine	Lucerne, Switzerland
20:45 UTC+1		Report		Stadium: Swissporarena; Referee: Anastasios Sidiropoulos (Greece)
Note: The Switzerland v Ukraine match was cancelled and awarded as a 3–0 win to Switzerland after the Ukraine national team were placed in quarantine by the local government due to positive SARS-CoV-2 tests in the squad.

=== 2021 ===
25 March 2021 2022 World Cup qualification	Bulgaria	1–3	Switzerland	Sofia, Bulgaria
19:00 UTC+2	Despodov 46'	Report	Embolo 7'; Seferovic 10'; Zuber 13'	Stadium: Vasil Levski National Stadium; Attendance: 0 Referee: Nikola Dabanović (Montenegro)

28 March 2021 2022 World Cup qualification	Switzerland	1–0	Lithuania	St. Gallen, Switzerland
21:00 UTC+2 (Note: The match, originally to be played at 20:45 UTC+2, was delayed by 15 minutes because a wrong-sized goal had to be replaced.)	Shaqiri 2'	Report		Stadium: Kybunpark; Attendance: 0 Referee: Mattias Gestranius (Finland)

31 March 2021 Friendly	Switzerland	3–2	Finland	St. Gallen, Switzerland
20:45 UTC+2	Gavranović 22'; Vargas 57'; Seferovic 86'	Report	Pohjanpalo 30', 40' (pen.)	Stadium: Kybunpark; Attendance: 0 Referee: Manuel Schüttengruber (Austria)

30 May 2021 Friendly	Switzerland	2–1	United States	St. Gallen, Switzerland
20:15 UTC+2	Rodríguez 10'; Zuber 63'	Report	Lletget 5'	Stadium: Kybunpark; Attendance: 0 Referee: Harm Osmers (Germany)

3 June 2021 Friendly	Switzerland	7–0	Liechtenstein	St. Gallen, Switzerland
18:00 UTC+2	Gavranović 19', 75', 79'; Fassnacht 46', 70'; Frick 57' (o.g.); Fernandes 85'	Report		Stadium: Kybunpark; Attendance: 0 Referee: Nejc Kajtazović (Slovenia)
Note: The match was originally scheduled for 4 June 2020, but postponed due to the COVID-19 pandemic in Switzerland.

12 June 2021 Euro 2020 Group A	Wales	1–1	Switzerland	Baku, Azerbaijan
17:00 UTC+4	Moore 74'	Report	Embolo 49'	Stadium: Baku Olympic Stadium; Attendance: 8,782; Referee: Clément Turpin (France)

16 June 2021 Euro 2020 Group A	Italy	3–0	Switzerland	Rome, Italy
21:00 UTC+2	Locatelli 26', 52'; Immobile 89'	Report		Stadium: Stadio Olimpico; Attendance: 12,445; Referee: Sergei Karasev (Russia)

20 June 2021 Euro 2020 Group A	Switzerland	3–1	Turkey	Baku, Azerbaijan
20:00 UTC+4	Seferovic 6'; Shaqiri 26', 68'	Report	Kahveci 62'	Stadium: Baku Olympic Stadium; Attendance: 17,138; Referee: Slavko Vinčić (Slovenia)

28 June 2021 Euro 2020 R16	France	3–3 (a.e.t.) (4–5 p)	Switzerland	Bucharest, Romania
22:00 UTC+3	Benzema 57', 59'; Pogba 75'	Report	Seferovic 15', 81'; Gavranović 90'	Stadium: Arena Națională; Attendance: 22,642; Referee: Fernando Rapallini (Argentina)
	Penalties
	Pogba (penalty scored); Giroud (penalty scored); Thuram (penalty scored); Kimpembe (penalty scored); Mbappé (penalty missed)		(penalty scored) Gavranović; (penalty scored) Schär; (penalty scored) Akanji; (penalty scored) Vargas; (penalty scored) Mehmedi

2 July 2021 Euro 2020 QF	Switzerland	1–1 (a.e.t.) (1–3 p)	Spain	Saint Petersburg, Russia
19:00 UTC+3	Shaqiri 68'	Report	Zakaria 8' (o.g.)	Stadium: Krestovsky Stadium; Attendance: 24,764; Referee: Michael Oliver (England)
	Penalties
	Gavranović (penalty scored); Schär (penalty missed); Akanji (penalty missed); Vargas (penalty missed)		(penalty missed) Busquets; (penalty scored) Olmo; (penalty missed) Rodri; (penalty scored) Gerard; (penalty scored) Oyarzabal

1 September 2021 Friendly	Switzerland	2–1	Greece	Basel, Switzerland
20:45 UTC+2	Zuber 7'; Vargas 51'	Report	Pavlidis 34'	Stadium: St. Jakob-Park; Attendance: 3,500; Referee: Antti Munukka (Finland)

5 September 2021 2022 World Cup qualification	Switzerland	0–0	Italy	Basel, Switzerland
20:45 UTC+2		Report		Stadium: St. Jakob-Park; Attendance: 31,500; Referee: Carlos del Cerro Grande (Spain)

8 September 2021 2022 World Cup qualification	Northern Ireland	0–0	Switzerland	Belfast, Northern Ireland
19:45 UTC+1		Report		Stadium: Windsor Park; Attendance: 15,660; Referee: Harald Lechner (Austria)

9 October 2021 2022 World Cup qualification	Switzerland	2–0	Northern Ireland	Geneva, Switzerland
20:45 UTC+2	Zuber 45+3'; Fassnacht 90+1'	Report		Stadium: Stade de Genève; Attendance: 19,129; Referee: Slavko Vinčić (Slovenia)

12 October 2021 2022 World Cup qualification	Lithuania	0–4	Switzerland	Vilnius, Lithuania
21:45 UTC+3		Report	Embolo 31', 45'; Steffen 42'; Gavranović 90+4'	Stadium: LFF Stadium; Attendance: 1,806; Referee: Tiago Martins (Portugal)

12 November 2021 2022 World Cup qualification	Italy	1–1	Switzerland	Rome, Italy
20:45 UTC+1	Di Lorenzo 36'	Report	Widmer 11'	Stadium: Stadio Olimpico; Attendance: 45,699; Referee: Anthony Taylor (England)

15 November 2021 2022 World Cup qualification	Switzerland	4–0	Bulgaria	Lucerne, Switzerland
20:45 UTC+1	Okafor 48'; Vargas 57'; Itten 72'; Freuler 90+1'	Report		Stadium: Swissporarena; Attendance: 14,300; Referee: Benoît Bastien (France)

=== 2022 ===
26 March 2022 Friendly	England	2–1	Switzerland	London, England
17:30 UTC+0	Shaw 45+1'; Kane 78' (pen.)	Report	Embolo 22'	Stadium: Wembley Stadium; Attendance: 78,881; Referee: Andreas Ekberg (Sweden)

29 March 2022 Friendly	Switzerland	1–1	Kosovo	Zürich, Switzerland
18:00 UTC+2	Lotomba 61'	Report	Rashica 52'	Stadium: Letzigrund; Attendance: 20,000; Referee: Ruddy Buquet (France)

2 June 2022 2022–23 Nations League	Czech Republic	2–1	Switzerland	Prague, Czech Republic
20:45 UTC+2	Kuchta 11'; Sow 58' (o.g.)	Report	Okafor 44'	Stadium: Sinobo Stadium; Attendance: 12,236; Referee: Daniel Siebert (Germany)

5 June 2022 2022–23 Nations League	Portugal	4–0	Switzerland	Lisbon, Portugal
19:45 UTC+1	Carvalho 15'; Ronaldo 35', 39'; Cancelo 68'	Report		Stadium: Estádio José Alvalade; Attendance: 42,325; Referee: Orel Grinfeeld (Israel)

9 June 2022 2022–23 Nations League	Switzerland	0–1	Spain	Geneva, Switzerland
20:45 UTC+2		Report	Sarabia 13'	Stadium: Stade de Genève; Attendance: 25,875; Referee: Serdar Gözübüyük (Netherlands)

12 June 2022 2022–23 Nations League	Switzerland	1–0	Portugal	Geneva, Switzerland
20:45 UTC+2	Seferovic 1'	Report		Stadium: Stade de Genève; Attendance: 26,300; Referee: Fran Jović (Croatia)

24 September 2022 2022–23 Nations League	Spain	1–2	Switzerland	Zaragoza, Spain
20:45 UTC+2	Alba 55'	Report	Akanji 21'; Embolo 58'	Stadium: La Romareda; Attendance: 31,809; Referee: Clément Turpin (France)

27 September 2022 2022–23 Nations League	Switzerland	2–1	Czech Republic	St. Gallen, Switzerland
20:45 UTC+2	Freuler 29'; Embolo 30'	Report	Schick 45'	Stadium: Kybunpark; Attendance: 13,353; Referee: Irfan Peljto (Bosnia and Herzegovina)

17 November 2022 Friendly	Ghana	2–0	Switzerland	Abu Dhabi, United Arab Emirates
14:00 UTC+4	Salisu 70'; Semenyo 74'	Report		Stadium: Zayed Sports City Stadium; Attendance: 650; Referee: Ahmed Eisa Darwish (United Arab Emirates)

24 November 2022 2022 World Cup Group G	Switzerland	1–0	Cameroon	Al Wakrah, Qatar
13:00 UTC+3	Embolo 48'	Report		Stadium: Al Janoub Stadium; Attendance: 39,089; Referee: Facundo Tello (Argentina)

28 November 2022 2022 World Cup Group G	Brazil	1–0	Switzerland	Doha, Qatar
19:00 UTC+3	Casemiro 83'	Report		Stadium: Stadium 974; Attendance: 43,649; Referee: Iván Barton (El Salvador)

2 December 2022 2022 World Cup Group G	Serbia	2–3	Switzerland	Doha, Qatar
22:00 UTC+3	A. Mitrović 26'; Vlahović 35'	Report	Shaqiri 20'; Embolo 44'; Freuler 48'	Stadium: Stadium 974; Attendance: 41,378; Referee: Fernando Rapallini (Argentina)

6 December 2022 2022 World Cup R16	Portugal	6–1	Switzerland	Lusail, Qatar
22:00 UTC+3	Ramos 17', 51', 67'; Pepe 33'; Guerreiro 55'; Leão 90+2'	Report	Akanji 58'	Stadium: Lusail Iconic Stadium; Attendance: 83,720; Referee: César Arturo Ramos (Mexico)

=== 2023 ===
25 March 2023 Euro 2024 qualifying	Belarus	0–5	Switzerland	Novi Sad, Serbia
18:00 UTC+1		Report	Steffen 4', 17', 29'; Xhaka 62'; Amdouni 65'	Stadium: Karađorđe Stadium; Attendance: 0 (Note: Due to the Belarusian country's involvement in the Russian invasion of Ukraine, Belarus are required to play their home matches at neutral venues and behind closed doors until further notice.); Referee: Alejandro Hernández Hernández (Spain)

28 March 2023 Euro 2024 qualifying	Switzerland	3–0	Israel	Geneva, Switzerland
20:45 UTC+1	Vargas 39'; Amdouni 48'; Widmer 52'	Report		Stadium: Stade de Genève; Attendance: 14,819; Referee: Nikola Dabanović (Montenegro)

16 June 2023 Euro 2024 qualifying	Andorra	1–2	Switzerland	Andorra la Vella, Andorra
20:45 UTC+2	Vieira 67'	Report	Freuler 7'; Amdouni 33'	Stadium: Estadi Nacional; Attendance: 2,490; Referee: Balázs Berke (Hungary)

19 June 2023 Euro 2024 qualifying	Switzerland	2–2	Romania	Lucerne, Switzerland
20:45 UTC+2	Amdouni 28', 41'	Report	Mihăilă 89', 90+2'	Stadium: Swissporarena; Attendance: 14,400; Referee: Daniele Orsato (Italy)

9 September 2023 Euro 2024 qualifying	Kosovo	2–2	Switzerland	Pristina, Kosovo
20:45 UTC+2	Muriqi 65', 90+4'	Report	Freuler 14', 79'	Stadium: Fadil Vokrri Stadium; Attendance: 12,700; Referee: Jakob Kehlet (Denmark)

12 September 2023 Euro 2024 qualifying	Switzerland	3–0	Andorra	Sion, Switzerland
20:45 UTC+2	Itten 49'; Xhaka 84'; Shaqiri 90+3' (pen.)	Report		Stadium: Stade Tourbillon; Attendance: 9,000; Referee: Elchin Masiyev (Azerbaijan)

15 October 2023 Euro 2024 qualifying	Switzerland	3–3	Belarus	St. Gallen, Switzerland
18:00 UTC+2	Shaqiri 28'; Akanji 89'; Amdouni 90'	Report	Ebong 61'; Polyakov 69'; Antilevsky 84'	Stadium: Kybunpark; Attendance: 17,000; Referee: João Pinheiro (Portugal)

15 November 2023 (Note: The Israel v Switzerland match, originally scheduled to be played at Bloomfield Stadium in Tel Aviv on 12 October 2023, was postponed to 15 November 2023 and relocated to a neutral site due to the Gaza war.) Euro 2024 qualifying	Israel	1–1	Switzerland	Felcsút, Hungary (Note: Due to the Gaza war, Israel play their remaining home matches at a neutral venue.)
20:45 UTC+1	Weissman 88'	Report	Vargas 36'	Stadium: Pancho Aréna; Attendance: 2,024; Referee: Anthony Taylor (England)

18 November 2023 Euro 2024 qualifying	Switzerland	1–1	Kosovo	Basel, Switzerland
20:45 UTC+1	Vargas 47'	Report	Hyseni 82'	Stadium: St. Jakob-Park; Attendance: 33,000; Referee: António Nobre (Portugal)

21 November 2023 Euro 2024 qualifying	Romania	1–0	Switzerland	Bucharest, Romania
21:45 UTC+2	Alibec 50'	Report		Stadium: Arena Națională; Attendance: 50,224; Referee: Davide Massa (Italy)

=== 2024 ===
23 March 2024 Friendly	Denmark	0–0	Switzerland	Copenhagen, Denmark
20:00 UTC+1		Report		Stadium: Parken Stadium; Attendance: 30,731; Referee: Allard Lindhout (Netherlands)

26 March 2024 Friendly	Republic of Ireland	0–1	Switzerland	Dublin, Ireland
19:45 UTC+0		Report	Shaqiri 23'	Stadium: Aviva Stadium; Attendance: 35,742; Referee: Paweł Raczkowski (Poland)

4 June 2024 Friendly	Switzerland	4–0	Estonia	Lucerne, Switzerland
20:15 UTC+2	Zuber 20'; Amdouni 47'; Elvedi 63'; Shaqiri 70' (pen.)	Report		Stadium: Swissporarena; Attendance: 14,473; Referee: Kyriakos Athanasiou (Cyprus)

8 June 2024 Friendly	Switzerland	1–1	Austria	St. Gallen, Switzerland
18:00 UTC+2	Widmer 23'	Report	Baumgartner 5'	Stadium: Kybunpark; Attendance: 18,731; Referee: Maria Sole Ferrieri Caputi (Italy)

15 June 2024 Euro 2024 Group A	Hungary	1–3	Switzerland	Cologne, Germany
15:00 UTC+2	Varga 66'	Report	Duah 12'; Aebischer 45'; Embolo 90+3'	Stadium: RheinEnergieStadion; Attendance: 41,676; Referee: Slavko Vinčić (Slovenia)

19 June 2024 Euro 2024 Group A	Scotland	1–1	Switzerland	Cologne, Germany
21:00 UTC+2	McTominay 13'	Report	Shaqiri 26'	Stadium: RheinEnergieStadion; Attendance: 42,711; Referee: Ivan Kružliak (Slovakia)

23 June 2024 Euro 2024 Group A	Switzerland	1–1	Germany	Frankfurt, Germany
21:00 UTC+2	Ndoye 28'	Report	Füllkrug 90+2'	Stadium: Waldstadion; Attendance: 46,685; Referee: Daniele Orsato (Italy)

29 June 2024 Euro 2024 R16	Switzerland	2–0	Italy	Berlin, Germany
18:00 UTC+2	Freuler 37'; Vargas 46'	Report		Stadium: Olympiastadion; Attendance: 68,172; Referee: Szymon Marciniak (Poland)

6 July 2024 Euro 2024 QF	England	1–1 (a.e.t.) (5–3 p)	Switzerland	Düsseldorf, Germany
18:00 UTC+2	Saka 80'	Report	Embolo 75'	Stadium: Merkur Spiel-Arena; Attendance: 46,907; Referee: Daniele Orsato (Italy)
	Penalties
	Palmer (penalty scored); Bellingham (penalty scored); Saka (penalty scored); Toney (penalty scored); Alexader-Arnold (penalty scored)		(penalty missed) Akanji; (penalty scored) Schär; (penalty scored) Shaqiri; (penalty scored) Amdouni

5 September 2024 2024–25 Nations League	Denmark	2–0	Switzerland	Copenhagen, Denmark
20:45 UTC+2	Dorgu 82'; Højbjerg 90+2'	Report		Stadium: Parken Stadium; Attendance: 26,024; Referee: Daniel Siebert (Germany)

8 September 2024 2024–25 Nations League	Switzerland	1–4	Spain	Geneva, Switzerland
20:45 UTC+2	Amdouni 41'	Report	Joselu 4'; Fabián 13', 77'; F. Torres 80'	Stadium: Stade de Genève; Attendance: 26,265; Referee: Irfan Peljto (Bosnia and Herzegovina)

12 October 2024 2024–25 Nations League	Serbia	2–0	Switzerland	Leskovac, Serbia
20:45 UTC+2	Elvedi 45+1' (o.g.); Mitrović 61'	Report		Stadium: Dubočica Stadium; Attendance: 6,383; Referee: Simone Sozza (Italy)

15 October 2024 2024–25 Nations League	Switzerland	2–2	Denmark	St. Gallen, Switzerland
20:45 UTC+2	Freuler 26'; Amdouni 45+1' (pen.)	Report	Isaksen 27'; Eriksen 69'	Stadium: Kybunpark; Attendance: 16,182; Referee: Halil Umut Meler (Turkey)

15 November 2024 2024–25 Nations League	Switzerland	1–1	Serbia	Zürich, Switzerland
20:45 UTC+1	Amdouni 78'	Report	Terzić 88'	Stadium: Stadion Letzigrund; Attendance: 21,115; Referee: Clément Turpin (France)

18 November 2024 2024–25 Nations League	Spain	3–2	Switzerland	Santa Cruz de Tenerife, Spain
20:45 UTC+1	Pino 32'; Gil 68'; Zaragoza 90+3' (pen.)	Report	Monteiro 63'; Zeqiri 85' (pen.)	Stadium: Heliodoro Rodríguez López; Attendance: 21,204; Referee: Bastian Dankert (Germany)

=== 2025 ===
21 March 2025 Friendly	Northern Ireland	1–1	Switzerland	Belfast, Northern Ireland
19:45 UTC+0	Price 16'	Report	Sierro 29'	Stadium: Windsor Park; Attendance: 17,862; Referee: Mohammed Al-Hakim (Sweden)

25 March 2025 Friendly	Switzerland	3–1	Luxembourg	St. Gallen, Switzerland
20:45 UTC+1	Vargas 9', 29'; Embolo 12' (pen.)	Report	Sinani 89' (pen.)	Stadium: Kybunpark; Attendance: 8,363; Referee: Enea Jorgji (Albania)

7 June 2025 Friendly	Mexico	2–4	Switzerland	Salt Lake City, United States
14:00 UTC−6	Giménez 51'; Sepúlveda 75'	Report	Embolo 20'; Amdouni 64'; Ndoye 71'; Rieder 90'	Stadium: Rice–Eccles Stadium; Attendance: 41,508; Referee: Victor Rivas (United States)

10 June 2025 Friendly	United States	0–4	Switzerland	Nashville, United States
19:00 UTC−5		Report	Ndoye 13'; Aebischer 23'; Embolo 33'; Manzambi 36'	Stadium: Geodis Park; Attendance: 20,602; Referee: Andrew Samuel (Trinidad and Tobago)

5 September 2025 2026 World Cup qualification	Switzerland	4–0	Kosovo	Basel, Switzerland
20:45 UTC+2	Akanji 22'; Embolo 25', 45'; Widmer 39'	Report		Stadium: St. Jakob-Park; Attendance: 33,996; Referee: Szymon Marciniak (Poland)

8 September 2025 2026 World Cup qualification	Switzerland	3–0	Slovenia	Basel, Switzerland
20:45 UTC+2	Elvedi 18'; Embolo 33'; Ndoye 38'	Report		Stadium: St. Jakob-Park; Attendance: 12,757; Referee: François Letexier (France)

10 October 2025 2026 World Cup qualification	Sweden	0–2	Switzerland	Solna, Sweden
20:45 UTC+2		Report	Xhaka 65' (pen.); Manzambi 90+4'	Stadium: Friends Arena; Attendance: 50,151; Referee: Anthony Taylor (England)

13 October 2025 2026 World Cup qualification	Slovenia	0–0	Switzerland	Ljubljana, Slovenia
20:45 UTC+2		Report		Stadium: Stožice Stadium; Attendance: 14,637; Referee: Felix Zwayer (Germany)

15 November 2025 2026 World Cup qualification	Switzerland	4–1	Sweden	Geneva, Switzerland
20:45 UTC+1	Embolo 13'; Xhaka 60' (pen.); Ndoye 75'; Manzambi 90+4'	Report	Nygren 33'	Stadium: Stade de Genève; Attendance: 26,458; Referee: Erik Lambrechts (Belgium)

18 November 2025 2026 World Cup qualification	Kosovo	1–1	Switzerland	Pristina, Kosovo
20:45 UTC+1	Muslija 74'	Report	Vargas 47'	Stadium: Fadil Vokrri Stadium; Attendance: 11,215; Referee: Davide Massa (Italy)

=== 2026 ===
27 March 2026 Friendly	Switzerland	3–4	Germany	Basel, Switzerland
20:45 UTC+1	Ndoye 17'; Embolo 41'; Monteiro 79'	Report	Tah 26'; Gnabry 45+2'; Wirtz 61', 85'	Stadium: St. Jakob-Park; Attendance: 34,316; Referee: Chris Kavanagh (England)

31 March 2026 Friendly	Norway	0–0	Switzerland	Oslo, Norway
18:00 UTC+2		Report		Stadium: Ullevaal Stadion; Attendance: 23,913; Referee: Jasper Vergoote (Belgium)

31 May 2026 Friendly	Switzerland	4–1	Jordan	St. Gallen, Switzerland
15:00 UTC+2	Embolo 28' (pen.); Ndoye 33'; Xhaka 45+9' (pen.); Fassnacht 79'	Report	Al-Fakhouri 52'	Stadium: Kybunpark; Attendance: 13,380; Referee: Rohit Saggi (Norway)

6 June 2026 Friendly	Switzerland	1–1	Australia	San Diego, United States
12:00 UTC−7	Ndoye 14'	Report	Yengi 56'	Stadium: Snapdragon Stadium; Attendance: 6,107; Referee: Katja Koroleva (United States)

13 June 2026 2026 World Cup Group B	Qatar	1–1	Switzerland	Santa Clara, United States
12:00 UTC−7	Khoukhi 90+4'	Report	Embolo 17' (pen.)	Stadium: Levi's Stadium; Attendance: 67,966; Referee: Saíd Martínez (Honduras)

18 June 2026 2026 World Cup Group B	Switzerland	4–1	Bosnia and Herzegovina	Inglewood, United States
12:00 UTC−7	Manzambi 74', 90'; Vargas 84'; Xhaka 90+7' (pen.)	Report	Mahmić 90+3'	Stadium: SoFi Stadium; Attendance: 70,026; Referee: João Pinheiro (Portugal)

24 June 2026 2026 World Cup Group B	Switzerland	2–1	Canada	Vancouver, Canada
12:00 UTC−7	Vargas 46'; Manzambi 57'	Report	P. David 76'	Stadium: BC Place; Attendance: 52,497; Referee: Ramon Abatti (Brazil)

2 July 2026 2026 World Cup R32	Switzerland	2–0	Algeria	Vancouver, Canada
20:00 UTC−7	Embolo 10'; Ndoye 46'	Report		Stadium: BC Place; Attendance: 52,497; Referee: Yael Falcón (Argentina)

7 July 2026 2026 World Cup R16	Switzerland	0–0 (a.e.t.) (4–3 p)	Colombia	Vancouver, Canada
13:00 UTC−7		Report		Stadium: BC Place; Attendance: 52,497; Referee: Iván Barton (El Salvador)
	Penalties
	Xhaka (penalty scored); Amdouni (penalty scored); Akanji (penalty missed); Itten (penalty scored); Vargas (penalty scored)		(penalty scored) Quintero; (penalty missed) Sánchez; (penalty scored) Campaz; (penalty missed) Hernández; (penalty scored) Díaz

11 July 2026 2026 World Cup QF	Argentina	3–1 (a.e.t.)	Switzerland	Kansas City, United States
20:00 UTC−5	Mac Allister 10'; Alvarez 112'; La. Martínez 120+1'	Report	Ndoye 67'	Stadium: Arrowhead Stadium; Attendance: 69,045; Referee: João Pinheiro (Portugal)

26 September 2026 2026–27 Nations League	North Macedonia	0–3	Switzerland	Skopje, North Macedonia
20:45 UTC+2		Report	Freuler 22'; Amdouni 41', 74'	Stadium: Toše Proeski Arena; Attendance: 11,474; Referee: Daniel Schlager (Germany)

29 September 2026 2026–27 Nations League	Scotland	0–3	Switzerland	Glasgow, Scotland
19:45 UTC+1		Report	Rodriguez 12'; Elvedi 55'; Amdouni 82'	Stadium: Hampden Park; Attendance: 41,028; Referee: Nenad Minaković (Serbia)

3 October 2026 2026–27 Nations League	Switzerland	2–1	Slovenia	Lucerne, Switzerland
20:45 UTC+2	Janža 10' (o.g.); Ndoye 38'	Report	Vipotnik 2'	Stadium: Thermoplan Arena; Attendance: 15,240; Referee: Ivan Kružliak (Slovakia)

6 October 2026 2026–27 Nations League	Switzerland	3–0	North Macedonia	Lucerne, Switzerland
20:45 UTC+2	Rieder 43'; Manzambi 73'; Ndoye 81'	Report		Stadium: Thermoplan Arena; Attendance: 15,730; Referee: Edgars Maļcevs (Latvia)

13 November 2026 2026–27 Nations League	Slovenia	0–0	Switzerland	Maribor, Slovenia
20:45 UTC+1		Report		Stadium: Ljudski vrt Attendance: 10,500; Referee: Jasper Vergoote (Belgium)

16 November 2026 2026–27 Nations League	Switzerland	4–0	Scotland	St.Gallen, Switzerland
20:45 UTC+1	Ferguson 22' (o.g.); Boteli 47'; Sanches 51'; Amdouni 89'	Report		Stadium: Kybunpark; Attendance: 17,742; Referee: Danny Makkelie (Netherlands)

== Head to head record ==
As of match played 16 November 2026

Head to head records
Opponent	P	W	D	L	GF	GA	W%	D%	L%
Andorra	2	2	0	0	5	1	100	0	0
Algeria	1	1	0	0	2	0	100	0	0
Argentina	1	0	0	1	1	3	0	0	100
Austria	1	0	1	0	1	1	0	100	0
Australia	1	0	1	0	1	1	0	100	0
Belarus	2	1	1	0	8	3	50	50	0
Belgium	1	0	0	1	1	2	0	0	100
Bosnia and Herzegovina	1	1	0	0	4	1	100	0	0
Brazil	1	0	0	1	0	1	0	0	100
Bulgaria	2	2	0	0	7	1	100	0	0
Cameroon	1	1	0	0	1	0	100	0	0
Canada	1	1	0	0	2	1	100	0	0
Colombia	1	0	1	0	0	0	0	100	0
Croatia	1	0	0	1	1	2	0	0	100
Czech Republic	2	1	0	1	3	3	50	0	50
Denmark	3	0	2	1	2	4	0	66.67	33.33
England	2	0	1	1	2	3	0	50	50
Estonia	1	1	0	0	4	0	100	0	0
Finland	1	1	0	0	3	2	0	0	0
France	1	0	1	0	3	3	0	100	0
Germany	4	0	3	1	8	9	0	75	25
Ghana	1	0	0	1	0	2	0	0	100
Greece	1	1	0	0	2	1	100	0	0
Hungary	1	1	0	0	3	1	100	0	0
Israel	2	1	1	0	4	1	50	50	0
Italy	4	1	2	1	3	4	25	50	25
Jordan	1	1	0	0	4	1	100	0	0
Kosovo	5	1	4	0	9	5	20	80	0
Liechtenstein	1	1	0	0	7	0	100	0	0
Lithuania	2	2	0	0	5	0	100	0	0
Luxembourg	1	1	0	0	3	1	100	0	0
Mexico	1	1	0	0	4	2	100	0	0
North Macedonia	2	2	0	0	6	0	100	0	0
Northern Ireland	3	1	2	0	3	1	33.33	66.67	0
Norway	1	0	1	0	0	0	0	100	0
Portugal	3	1	0	2	2	10	33.33	0	66.67
Qatar	1	0	1	0	1	1	0	100	0
Republic of Ireland	1	1	0	0	1	0	100	0	0
Romania	2	0	1	1	2	3	0	50	50
Scotland	3	2	1	0	8	1	66.67	33.33	0
Serbia	3	1	1	1	4	5	33.33	33.33	33.33
Slovenia	4	2	2	0	5	1	50	50	0
Spain	7	1	2	4	7	12	14.29	28.57	57.14
Sweden	2	2	0	0	6	1	100	0	0
Turkey	1	1	0	0	3	1	100	0	0
Ukraine	2	1	0	1	4	2	50	0	50
United States	2	2	0	0	6	1	100	0	0
Wales	1	0	1	0	1	1	0	100	0
Total	89	40	30	19	158	99	44.94	33.71	21.35
