= Sweden men's national football team results (2020–present) =

- Win Draw Loss

This article provides details of international football games played by the Sweden men's national football team from 2020 to present.

== Results ==
Key
Win
Draw
Defeat

=== 2020 ===
9 January 2020 Friendly	Sweden	1–0	Moldova	Doha, Qatar
20:00 UTC+3	Larsson 32'	Report		Stadium: Hamad bin Khalifa Stadium; Attendance: 100; Referee: Saoud Al-Athba (Qatar)

12 January 2020 Friendly	Sweden	1–0	Kosovo	Doha, Qatar
17:45 UTC+3	Hedlund 75'	Report		Stadium: Hamad bin Khalifa Stadium; Attendance: 75; Referee: Mohammed Al-Shammari (Qatar)

31 March 2020 Friendly	Cyprus	Cancelled	Sweden

5 September 2020 2020–21 Nations League	Sweden	0–1	France	Solna, Sweden
20:45 UTC+2		Report	Mbappé 42'	Stadium: Friends Arena; Attendance: 0 (Note: Due to the COVID-19 pandemic in Europe, all matches scheduled for September 2020 were played behind closed doors.); Referee: Szymon Marciniak (Poland)

8 September 2020 2020–21 Nations League	Sweden	0–2	Portugal	Solna, Sweden
20:45 UTC+2		Report	Ronaldo 45+1', 72'	Stadium: Friends Arena; Attendance: 0 Referee: Danny Makkelie (Netherlands)

8 October 2020 Friendly	Russia	1–2	Sweden	Moscow, Russia
19:15 UTC+3	Sobolev 90+1'	Report	Isak 21'; Johansson 72'	Stadium: VEB Arena; Attendance: 5,000; Referee: Halis Özkahya (Turkey)
Note: The match was originally scheduled for 28 March 2020 at the Friends Arena, Solna, but postponed due to the COVID-19 pandemic in Sweden.

11 October 2020 2020–21 Nations League	Croatia	2–1	Sweden	Zagreb, Croatia
18:00 UTC+2	Vlašić 32'; Kramarić 84'	Report	Berg 66'	Stadium: Stadion Maksimir; Attendance: 2,020; Referee: John Beaton (Scotland)

14 October 2020 2020–21 Nations League	Portugal	3–0	Sweden	Lisbon, Portugal
19:45 UTC+1	B. Silva 21'; Jota 44', 72'	Report		Stadium: Estádio José Alvalade; Attendance: 5,000; Referee: Srđan Jovanović (Serbia)

11 November 2020 Friendly	Denmark	2–0	Sweden	Brøndby, Denmark
19:30 UTC+2	Wind 61'; Bah 74'	Report		Stadium: Brøndby Stadium; Attendance: 141; Referee: Espen Eskås (Norway)
Note: The match was originally scheduled for 7 June 2020, but postponed due to the COVID-19 pandemic in Denmark.

14 November 2020 2020–21 Nations League	Sweden	2–1	Croatia	Solna, Sweden
20:45 UTC+1	Kulusevski 36'; Danielson 45+2'	Report	Danielson 82' (o.g.)	Stadium: Friends Arena; Attendance: 0 (Note: Due to the COVID-19 pandemic in Europe, the match was played behind closed doors.); Referee: Daniel Siebert (Germany)

17 November 2020 2020–21 Nations League	France	4–2	Sweden	Saint-Denis, France
20:45 UTC+1	Giroud 16', 59'; Pavard 36'; Coman 90+5'	Report	Claesson 5'; Quaison 88'	Stadium: Stade de France; Attendance: 0 Referee: Aleksei Kulbakov (Belarus)

=== 2021 ===
25 March 2021 2022 World Cup qualification	Sweden	1–0	Georgia	Solna, Sweden
20:45	Claesson 35'	Report		Stadium: Friends Arena; Attendance: 0 Referee: Benoît Bastien (France)

28 March 2021 2022 World Cup qualification	Kosovo	0–3	Sweden	Pristina, Kosovo
20:45 UTC+2		Report	Augustinsson 12'; Isak 35'; Larsson 70' (pen.)	Stadium: Fadil Vokrri Stadium; Attendance: 0 Referee: Tamás Bognár (Hungary)

31 March 2021 Friendly	Sweden	1–0	Estonia	Solna, Sweden
17:45 UTC+2	Berg 3'	Report		Stadium: Friends Arena; Attendance: 0 Referee: Marco Fritz (Germany)

29 May 2021 Friendly	Sweden	2–0	Finland	Solna, Sweden
18:00 UTC+2	Quaison 23'; Larsson 58' (pen.)	Report		Stadium: Friends Arena; Attendance: 0 Referee: Jakob Kehlet (Denmark)
Note: The match was originally scheduled for 4 June 2020 at the Friends Arena, Solna, but postponed due to the COVID-19 pandemic in Sweden.

5 June 2021 Friendly	Sweden	3–1	Armenia	Solna, Sweden
20:45 UTC+2	Forsberg 16'; Danielson 34'; Berg 85'	Report	Bichakhchyan 64'	Stadium: Friends Arena; Attendance: 500; Referee: Mattias Gestranius (Finland)

14 June 2021 Euro 2020 Group E	Spain	0–0	Sweden	Seville, Spain
21:00 UTC+2		Report	Lustig (yellow card) 55'	Stadium: La Cartuja; Attendance: 10,559; Referee: Slavko Vinčić (Slovenia)

18 June 2021 Euro 2020 Group E	Sweden	1–0	Slovakia	Saint Petersburg, Russia
16:00 UTC+3	Olsson (yellow card) 23'; Forsberg 77' (pen.)	Report	Dúbravka (yellow card) 76'; Duda (yellow card) 80'; Weiss (yellow card) 87'	Stadium: Krestovsky Stadium; Attendance: 11,525; Referee: Daniel Siebert (Germany)

23 June 2021 Euro 2020 Group E	Sweden	3–2	Poland	Saint Petersburg, Russia
19:00 UTC+3	Forsberg 2', 59'; Claesson 90+4'	Report	Lewandowski 61', 84'	Stadium: Krestovsky Stadium; Attendance: 14,252; Referee: Michael Oliver (England)

29 June 2021 Euro 2020 Round of 16	Sweden	1–2 (a.e.t.)	Ukraine	Glasgow, Scotland
20:00 UTC+1	Forsberg 43'	Report	Zinchenko 27'; Dovbyk 120+1'	Stadium: Hampden Park; Attendance: 9,221; Referee: Daniele Orsato (Italy)

2 September 2021 2022 World Cup qualification	Sweden	2–1	Spain	Solna, Sweden
20:45 UTC+2	Isak 6'; Claesson 57'	Report	Soler 5'	Stadium: Friends Arena; Attendance: 16,901; Referee: Anthony Taylor (England)

5 September 2021 Friendly	Sweden	2–1	Uzbekistan	Solna, Sweden
15:00 UTC+2	Abdullaev 6' (o.g.); Kiese Thelin 35'	Report	Shomurodov 71'	Stadium: Friends Arena; Attendance: 12,974; Referee: Kai Erik Steen (Norway)

8 September 2021 2022 World Cup qualification	Greece	2–1	Sweden	Athens, Greece
21:45 UTC+3	Bakasetas 62'; Pavlidis 78'	Report	Quaison 80'	Stadium: Olympic Stadium; Attendance: 3,475; Referee: Sergei Karasev (Russia)

9 October 2021 2022 World Cup qualification	Sweden	3–0	Kosovo	Solna, Sweden
20:45 UTC+2	Forsberg 29' (pen.); Isak 62'; Quaison 79'	Report		Stadium: Friends Arena; Attendance: 44,213; Referee: Marco Di Bello (Italy)

12 October 2021 2022 World Cup qualification	Sweden	2–0	Greece	Solna, Sweden
20:45 UTC+2	Forsberg 59' (pen.); Isak 69'	Report		Stadium: Friends Arena; Attendance: 47,314; Referee: Tobias Stieler (Germany)

11 November 2021 2022 World Cup qualification	Georgia	2–0	Sweden	Batumi, Georgia
21:00 UTC+4	Kvaratskhelia 61', 77'	Report		Stadium: Batumi Stadium; Attendance: 6,800; Referee: Serdar Gözübüyük (Netherlands)

14 November 2021 2022 World Cup qualification	Spain	1–0	Sweden	Seville, Spain
20:45 UTC+1	Morata 86'	Report		Stadium: La Cartuja; Attendance: 51,844; Referee: Felix Brych (Germany)

=== 2022 ===
24 March 2022 2022 World Cup qualification play-offs	Sweden	1–0 (a.e.t.)	Czech Republic	Solna, Sweden
20:45 UTC+1	Quaison 110'	Report		Stadium: Friends Arena; Attendance: 48,628; Referee: Michael Oliver (England)

29 March 2022 2022 World Cup qualification play-offs	Poland	2–0	Sweden	Chorzów, Poland
20:45 UTC+2	Lewandowski 50' (pen.); Zieliński 72'	Report		Stadium: Stadion Śląski (Note: The potential final match hosted by Poland, originally scheduled to be played at Stadion Narodowy, Warsaw, was later moved on 19 January 2022 to Stadion Śląski, Chorzów, due to the presence of a temporary hospital at the Stadion Narodowy.); Attendance: 54,078; Referee: Daniele Orsato (Italy)

2 June 2022 2022–23 Nations League	Slovenia	0–2	Sweden	Ljubljana, Slovenia
20:45 UTC+2		Report	Forsberg 39' (pen.); Kulusevski 88'	Stadium: Stožice Stadium; Attendance: 5,123; Referee: Ruddy Buquet (France)

5 June 2022 2022–23 Nations League	Sweden	1–2	Norway	Solna, Sweden
20:45 UTC+2	Elanga 90+2'	Report	Haaland 20' (pen.), 69'	Stadium: Friends Arena; Attendance: 42,320; Referee: Anthony Taylor (England)

9 June 2022 2022–23 Nations League	Sweden	0–1	Serbia	Solna, Sweden
20:45 UTC+2		Report	Jović 45+3'	Stadium: Friends Arena; Attendance: 24,123; Referee: Lawrence Visser (Belgium)

12 June 2022 2022–23 Nations League	Norway	3–2	Sweden	Oslo, Norway
18:00 UTC+2	Haaland 10', 54' (pen.); Sørloth 77'	Report	Forsberg 62'; Gyökeres 90+5'	Stadium: Ullevaal Stadion; Attendance: 24,273; Referee: Harm Osmers (Germany)

24 September 2022 2022–23 Nations League	Serbia	4–1	Sweden	Belgrade, Serbia
20:45 UTC+2	A. Mitrović 18', 45+1', 50'; Lukić 70'	Report	Claesson 15'	Stadium: Red Star Stadium; Attendance: 0 Referee: Georgi Kabakov (Bulgaria)

27 September 2022 2022–23 Nations League	Sweden	1–1	Slovenia	Solna, Sweden
20:45 UTC+2	Forsberg 42'	Report	Šeško 28'	Stadium: Friends Arena; Attendance: 22,895; Referee: Felix Zwayer (Germany)

16 November 2022 Friendly	Mexico	1–2	Sweden	Girona, Spain
20:30 UTC+1	Vega 60'	Report	Rohdén 54'; Svanberg 84'	Stadium: Estadi Montilivi; Attendance: 5,395; Referee: César Soto Grado (Spain)

19 November 2022 Friendly	Sweden	2–0	Algeria	Malmö, Sweden
20:30 UTC+1	Forsberg 45+3' (pen.); Claesson 47'	Report		Stadium: Eleda Stadion; Attendance: 13,486; Referee: Espen Eskås (Norway)

=== 2023 ===
9 January 2023 Friendly	Sweden	2–0	Finland	Faro/Loulé, Portugal
18:45 UTC+0	Nyman 38'; Asoro 90+3'	Report		Stadium: Estádio Algarve; Attendance: 300; Referee: Vítor Ferreira (Portugal)

12 January 2023 Friendly	Sweden	2–1	Iceland	Faro/Loulé, Portugal
18:00 UTC+0	Andersson 85'; Ondrejka 90+4'	Report	Guðjohnsen 30'	Stadium: Estádio Algarve; Attendance: 212; Referee: Luís Godinho (Portugal)

24 March 2023 Euro 2024 qualifying	Sweden	0–3	Belgium	Solna, Sweden
20:45 UTC+1		Report	Lukaku 35', 49', 83'	Stadium: Friends Arena; Attendance: 49,296; Referee: Orel Grinfeld (Israel)

27 March 2023 Euro 2024 qualifying	Sweden	5–0	Azerbaijan	Solna, Sweden
20:45 UTC+2	Forsberg 38'; Mustafazade 65' (o.g.); Gyökeres 79'; Karlsson 88'; Elanga 89'	Report		Stadium: Friends Arena; Attendance: 23,674; Referee: Stéphanie Frappart (France)

16 June 2023 Friendly	Sweden	4–1	New Zealand	Solna, Sweden
19:00 UTC+1	Karlsson 39', 45'; Quaison 44'; Elanga 90+2'	Report	McCowatt 7'	Stadium: Friends Arena; Attendance: 20,528; Referee: Craig Pawson (England)

20 June 2023 Euro 2024 qualifying	Austria	2–0	Sweden	Vienna, Austria
20:45 UTC+2	Baumgartner 81', 89'	Report		Stadium: Ernst-Happel-Stadion; Attendance: 46,300; Referee: Marco Guida (Italia)

9 September 2023 Euro 2024 qualifying	Estonia	0–5	Sweden	Tallinn, Estonia
19:00 UTC+3		Report	Gyökeres 18'; Kulusevski 24'; Isak 39'; Quaison 75'; Claesson 90+2'	Stadium: Lilleküla Stadium; Attendance: 11,411; Referee: Horațiu Feșnic (Romania)

12 September 2023 Euro 2024 qualifying	Sweden	1–3	Austria	Solna, Sweden
20:45 UTC+2	Holm 90'	Report	Gregoritsch 53'; Arnautović 56', 69' (pen.)	Stadium: Friends Arena; Attendance: 43,228; Referee: Serdar Gözübüyük (Netherlands)

12 October 2023 Friendly	Sweden	3–1	Moldova	Solna, Sweden
19:00 UTC+2	Karlsson 9', 74'; Lagerbielke 18'	Report	Nicolaescu 39'	Stadium: Friends Arena; Attendance: 10,097; Referee: Antti Munukka (Finland)

16 October 2023 Euro 2024 qualifying	Belgium	1–1 (Note: The Belgium v Sweden match was abandoned at half-time with the score 1–1 due to security reasons, after two Swedish supporters were killed in a terrorist shooting in Brussels. On 19 October 2023, UEFA decided that the half-time score would be considered final and the match would not be resumed.)	Sweden	Brussels, Belgium
20:45 UTC+2	Lukaku 31' (pen.)	Report	Gyökeres 15'	Stadium: King Baudouin Stadium; Attendance: 35,000; Referee: Maurizio Mariani (Italy)
Note: The match was abandoned at half-time with the score 1–1 due to security reasons, after two Swedish supporters were killed in a terrorist shooting in Brussels. On 19 October 2023, UEFA decided that the half-time score would be considered final and the match would not be resumed.

16 November 2023 Euro 2024 qualifying	Azerbaijan	3–0	Sweden	Baku, Azerbaijan
21:00 UTC+4	Mahmudov 3', 89'; Dadashov 6'	Report		Stadium: Tofiq Bahramov Republican Stadium; Attendance: 5,570; Referee: Esther Staubli (Switzerland)

19 November 2023 Euro 2024 qualifying	Sweden	2–0	Estonia	Solna, Sweden
18:00 UTC+1	Claesson 22'; Forsberg 55'	Report		Stadium: Friends Arena; Attendance: 11,201; Referee: Fabio Maresca (Italy)

=== 2024 ===
12 January 2024 Friendly	Sweden	2–1	Estonia	Paphos, Cyprus
20:00 UTC+2	Nanasi 30'; Kiese Thelin 54'	Report	Palumets 19'	Stadium: Stelios Kyriakides Stadium; Attendance: 100; Referee: Kyriakos Athanasiou (Cyprus)

21 March 2024 Friendly	Portugal	5–2	Sweden	Guimarães, Portugal
19:45	Leão 24'; Nunes 33'; Fernandes 45'; Bruma 57'; Ramos 61'	Report	Gyökeres 58'; Nilsson 90'	Stadium: Estádio D. Afonso Henriques; Attendance: 27,532; Referee: Ricardo de Burgos Bengoetxea (Spain)

25 March 2024 Friendly	Sweden	1–0	Albania	Solna, Sweden
18:00 CET	Nilsson 62'	Report		Stadium: Friends Arena; Attendance: 25,342; Referee: Marcel Bîrsan (Romania)

5 June 2024 Friendly	Denmark	2–1	Sweden	Copenhagen, Denmark
19:00 UTC+2	Højbjerg 2'; Eriksen 86'	Report	Isak 9'	Stadium: Parken Stadium; Attendance: 35,522; Referee: Kristoffer Hagenes (Norway)

8 June 2024 Friendly	Sweden	0–3	Serbia	Solna, Sweden
18:00 UTC+2		Report	Milinković-Savić 18'; Mitrović 60'; Tadić 70'	Stadium: Friends Arena; Attendance: 46,956; Referee: Jasper Vergoote (Belgium)

5 September 2024 2024–25 Nations League	Azerbaijan	1–3	Sweden	Baku, Azerbaijan
20:00 UTC+4	Dadashov 82'	Report	Isak 65', 71'; Gyökeres 80' (pen.)	Stadium: Tofiq Bahramov Republican Stadium; Attendance: 9,450; Referee: Balázs Berke (Hungary)

8 September 2024 2024–25 Nations League	Sweden	3–0	Estonia	Solna, Sweden
20:45 UTC+2	Gyökeres 30', 44'; Isak 40'	Report		Stadium: Strawberry Arena; Attendance: 14,858; Referee: Sven Jablonski (Germany)

11 October 2024 2024–25 Nations League	Slovakia	2–2	Sweden	Bratislava, Slovakia
20:45 UTC+2	Strelec 45', 72'	Report	Ayari 26'; Sema 32'	Stadium: Tehelné pole Attendance: 15,381; Referee: Maurizio Mariani (Italy)

14 October 2024 2024–25 Nations League	Estonia	0–3	Sweden	Tallinn, Estonia
21:45 UTC+3		Report	Nanasi 29', 37'; Gyökeres 66'	Stadium: Lilleküla Stadium; Attendance: 4,706; Referee: Juxhin Xhaja (Albania)

16 November 2024 2024–25 Nations League	Sweden	2–1	Slovakia	Solna, Sweden
20:45 UTC+1	Gyökeres 3'; Isak 48'	Report	Hancko 19'	Stadium: Strawberry Arena; Attendance: 36,417; Referee: Mykola Balakin (Ukraine)

19 November 2024 2024–25 Nations League	Sweden	6–0	Azerbaijan	Solna, Sweden
20:45 UTC+1	Kulusevski 10', 57'; Gyökeres 26', 37', 58', 70'	Report		Stadium: Strawberry Arena; Attendance: 10,127; Referee: Paweł Raczkowski (Poland)

=== 2025 ===
22 March 2025 Friendly	Luxembourg	1–0	Sweden	Luxembourg City, Luxembourg
18:00 UTC+1	Korać 24'	Report		Stadium: Stade de Luxembourg; Attendance: 9,214; Referee: Luca Cibelli (Switzerland)

25 March 2025 Friendly	Sweden	5–1	Northern Ireland	Solna, Sweden
19:00 UTC+1	Holm 7'; Nygren 33'; Sema 59'; Isak 64'; Elanga 77'	Report	Price 90'	Stadium: Nationalarenan; Attendance: 14,147; Referee: Matthew MacDermid (Scotland)

6 June 2025 Friendly	Hungary	0–2	Sweden	Budapest, Hungary
19:30 UTC+2		Report	Nygren 49'; Ayari 66'	Stadium: Puskás Aréna; Attendance: 53,865; Referee: Atilla Karaoğlan (Turkey)

10 June 2025 Friendly	Sweden	4–3	Algeria	Solna, Sweden
19:00 UTC+2	Sema 14', 39', 50' (pen.); Salétros 56'	Report	Bennacer 64'; Benzia 71'; Bentaleb 86' (pen.)	Stadium: Nationalarenan; Attendance: 15,148; Referee: Rob Harvey (Ireland)

5 September 2025 2026 World Cup qualification	Slovenia	2–2	Sweden	Ljubljana, Slovenia
20:45 UTC+2	Lovrić 46'; Vipotnik 90'	Report	Elanga 18'; Ayari 73'	Stadium: Stožice Stadium; Attendance: 15,679; Referee: José María Sánchez Martínez (Spain)

8 September 2025 2026 World Cup qualification	Kosovo	2–0	Sweden	Pristina, Kosovo
20:45 UTC+2	Rexhbeçaj 26'; Muriqi 42'	Report		Stadium: Fadil Vokrri Stadium; Attendance: 12,887; Referee: Allard Lindhout (Netherlands)

10 October 2025 2026 World Cup qualification	Sweden	0–2	Switzerland	Solna, Sweden
20:45 UTC+2		Report	Xhaka 65' (pen.); Manzambi 90+4'	Stadium: Nationalarenan; Attendance: 50,151; Referee: Anthony Taylor (England)

13 October 2025 2026 World Cup qualification	Sweden	0–1	Kosovo	Gothenburg, Sweden
20:45 UTC+2		Report	Asllani 32'	Stadium: Ullevi; Attendance: 36,571; Referee: Danny Makkelie (Netherlands)

15 November 2025 2026 World Cup qualification	Switzerland	4–1	Sweden	Geneva, Switzerland
20:45 UTC+1	Embolo 13'; Xhaka 60' (pen.); Ndoye 75'; Manzambi 90+4'	Report	Nygren 33'	Stadium: Stade de Genève; Attendance: 26,458; Referee: Erik Lambrechts (Belgium)

18 November 2025 2026 World Cup qualification	Sweden	1–1	Slovenia	Solna, Sweden
20:45 UTC+1	Lundgren 87'	Report	Elšnik 64'	Stadium: Nationalarenan; Attendance: 25,724; Referee: Maurizio Mariani (Italy)

=== 2026 ===
26 March 2026 2026 World Cup qualification play-offs	Ukraine	1–3	Sweden	Valencia, Spain
20:45 UTC+1	Ponomarenko 90'	Report	Gyökeres 6', 51', 73' (pen.)	Stadium: Estadio Ciutat de València; Attendance: 18,846; Referee: João Pinheiro (Portugal)

31 March 2026 2026 World Cup qualification play-offs	Sweden	3–2	Poland	Solna, Sweden
20:45 UTC+1	Elanga 20'; Lagerbielke 44'; Gyökeres 88'	Report	Zalewski 33'; Świderski 55'	Stadium: Nationalarenan; Attendance: 49,627; Referee: Slavko Vinčić (Slovenia)

1 June 2026 Friendly	Norway	3–1	Sweden	Oslo, Norway
19:00 UTC+2	Larsen 8', 37'; Nusa 18'	Report	Isak 76'	Stadium: Ullevaal Stadion; Attendance: 25,178; Referee: Balazs Berke (Slovenia)

4 June 2026 Friendly	Sweden	2–2	Greece	Solna, Sweden
19:00 UTC+2	Gyökeres 53'; Nilsson 69'	Report	Tsimikas 10'; Masouras 90+5'	Stadium: Nationalarenan; Attendance: 39,139; Referee: Aaron Wyn Jones (Wales)

14 June 2026 2026 World Cup Group F	Sweden	5–1	Tunisia	Guadalupe, Mexico
20:00 UTC−6	Ayari 7', 90+6'; Isak 30'; Gyökeres 59'; Svanberg 84'	Report	Rekik 43'	Stadium: Estadio BBVA; Attendance: 50,987; Referee: Yael Falcón (Argentina)

20 June 2026 2026 World Cup Group F	Netherlands	5–1	Sweden	Houston, United States
12:00 UTC−5	Brobbey 5', 17'; Gakpo 47', 54'; Summerville 89'	Report	Elanga 59'	Stadium: NRG Stadium; Attendance: 68,777; Referee: Michael Oliver (England)

25 June 2026 2026 World Cup Group F	Japan	1–1	Sweden	Arlington, United States
18:00 UTC−5	Maeda 56'	Report	Elanga 62'	Stadium: AT&T Stadium; Attendance: 70,137; Referee: Iván Barton (El Salvador)

30 June 2026 2026 World Cup Round of 32	France	3–0	Sweden	East Rutherford, United States
17:00 UTC−4	Mbappé 45', 74'; Barcola 53'	Report		Stadium: MetLife Stadium; Attendance: 80,663; Referee: Danny Makkelie (Netherlands)

25 September 2026 2026–27 Nations League	Sweden	2–1	Romania	Solna, Sweden
20:45 UTC+2	Isak 20'; Gyökeres 43'	Report	Man 29'	Stadium: Nationalarenan; Attendance: 31,882; Referee: Ondřej Berka (Czech Republic)

28 September 2026 2026–27 Nations League	Sweden	3–1	Poland	Solna, Sweden
20:45 UTC+2	Nygren 8'; Ayari 64'; Gyökeres 72'	Report	Szymański 43'	Stadium: Nationalarenan; Attendance: 24,637; Referee: Javier Alberola Rojas (Spain)

2 October 2026 2026–27 Nations League	Bosnia and Herzegovina	1–1	Sweden	Zenica, Bosnia and Herzegovina
20:45 UTC+2	Alajbegović 80'	Report	Gyökeres 61'	Stadium: Bilino Polje Stadium; Attendance: 11,700; Referee: Oleksii Derevinskyi (Ukraine)

5 October 2026 2026–27 Nations League	Romania	0–1	Sweden	Bucharest, Romania
21:45 UTC+3		Report	Gyökeres 13'	Stadium: Arena Națională; Attendance: 49,426; Referee: Elchin Masiyev (Azerbaijan)

14 November 2026 2026–27 Nations League	Sweden	3–2	Bosnia and Herzegovina	Solna, Sweden
20:45 UTC+1	Svensson 5'; Gyökeres 11' (pen.), 45+2' (pen.)	Report	Gigović 47'; Kolašinac 62'	Stadium: Nationalarenan; Attendance: 51,049; Referee: Simone Sozza (Italy)

17 November 2026 2026–27 Nations League	Poland	1–1	Sweden	Wrocław, Poland
20:45 UTC+1	Benedyczak 16'	Report	Larsson 24'	Stadium: Wrocław Stadium; Attendance: 38,516; Referee: Felix Zwayer (Germany)
