= 2025–26 SC Freiburg season =

SC Freiburg
2025–26 season
- President: Eberhard Fugmann
- Head coach: Julian Schuster
- Stadium: Europa-Park Stadion
- Bundesliga: 7th
- DFB-Pokal: Semi-finals
- UEFA Europa League: Runners-up
- Top goalscorer: League: Igor Matanović (11); All: Igor Matanović (15)
- Average home league attendance: 34,118
Home colours	Away colours	European colours

The 2025–26 season was the 122nd season in the history of SC Freiburg, and the club's tenth consecutive season in the Bundesliga. In addition to the domestic league, the club also participated in the DFB-Pokal and the UEFA Europa League, reaching the final of the latter.

== Background and pre-season ==
In March 2024, it was announced that Julian Schuster would take over from Christian Streich, who managed the club for 12 years, as head coach for the 2024–25 season. Freiburg finished the 2024–25 season in fifth, qualifying for the UEFA Europa League.

== Competitions ==
=== Bundesliga ===
==== League table ====
Pos	Team	Pld	W	D	L	GF	GA	GD	Pts	Qualification or relegation
5	TSG Hoffenheim	34	18	7	9	65	52	+13	61	Qualification for the Europa League league phase (Note: The 2025–26 DFB-Pokal winners qualified for the Europa League league phase. Since the DFB-Pokal winners, Bayern Munich, qualified for the Champions League, the Europa League spot passed to the sixth-placed team, and the Conference League spot passed to the seventh-placed team.)
6	Bayer Leverkusen	34	17	8	9	68	47	+21	59	Qualification for the Europa League league phase
7	SC Freiburg	34	13	8	13	51	57	−6	47	Qualification for the Conference League play-off round
8	Eintracht Frankfurt	34	11	11	12	61	65	−4	44	
9	FC Augsburg	34	12	7	15	45	61	−16	43	

Source: Bundesliga
Rules for classification: 1) Points; 2) Goal difference; 3) Goals scored; 4) Head-to-head results; 5) Head-to-head away goals scored; 6) Away goals scored; 7) Play-off.
(Rules 4–6 only apply after home and away matches have been played between the tied teams.)

==== Match details ====
Bundesliga match details
Round	Date	Time	Opponent	Venue	Result F–A	Freiburg scorers	Attendance	League position	Ref.
1	23 August 2025	15:30	FC Augsburg	Home	1–3	Grifo 58' pen.	33,600	15th	
2	31 August 2025	19:30	1. FC Köln	Away	1–4	Eggestein 84'	50,000	18th	
3	13 September 2025	15:30	VfB Stuttgart	Home	3–1	Matanović 81', 90+2' pen., Scherhant 86'	34,700	13th	
4	20 September 2025	15:30	Werder Bremen	Away	3–0	Grifo 33' pen., Adamu 54', Coulibaly 75' o.g.	40,500	7th	
5	28 September 2025	15:30	TSG Hoffenheim	Home	1–1	Kübler 3'	33,700	8th	
6	5 October 2025	19:30	Borussia Mönchengladbach	Away	0–0		44,709	8th	
7	19 October 2025	15:30	Eintracht Frankfurt	Home	2–2	Scherhant 2', Grifo 87'	34,700	10th	
8	26 October 2025	15:30	Bayer Leverkusen	Away	0–2		30,210	11th	
9	1 November 2025	15:30	Union Berlin	Away	0–0		22,012	11th	
10	9 November 2025	15:30	FC St. Pauli	Home	2–1	Suzuki 40', Eggestein 50'	34,700	10th	
11	22 November 2025	15:30	Bayern Munich	Away	2–6	Suzuki 12', Manzambi 18'	75,000	11th	
12	30 November 2025	19:30	Mainz 05	Home	4–0	Kübler 12', Grifo 26', Manzambi 50', Osterhage 90'	33,200	8th	
13	6 December 2025	15:30	1. FC Heidenheim	Away	1–2	Manzambi 40'	15,000	9th	
14	14 December 2025	15:30	Borussia Dortmund	Home	1–1	Höler 75'	34,700	9th	
15	20 December 2025	15:30	VfL Wolfsburg	Away	4–3	Treu 5', Grifo 56' pen., Seelt 71' o.g., Scherhant 78'	22,045	9th	
16	10 January 2026	15:30	Hamburger SV	Home	2–1	Grifo 53' pen., Matanović 83'	34,700	8th	
17	14 January 2026	20:30	RB Leipzig	Away	0–2		30,902	8th	
18	18 January 2026	17:30	FC Augsburg	Away	2–2	Suzuki 60', Matanović 62'	29,160	8th	
19	25 January 2026	17:30	1. FC Köln	Home	2–1	Scherhant 11', Matanović 44'	34,700	7th	
20	1 February 2026	15:30	VfB Stuttgart	Away	0–1		60,000	7th	
21	7 February 2026	15:30	Werder Bremen	Home	1–0	Beste 13'	34,700	7th	
22	14 February 2026	15:30	TSG Hoffenheim	Away	0–3		22,679	8th	
23	22 February 2026	15:30	Borussia Mönchengladbach	Home	2–1	Ginter 38', Matanović 74'	34,700	7th	
24	1 March 2026	17:30	Eintracht Frankfurt	Away	0–2		59,000	8th	
25	7 March 2026	15:30	Bayer Leverkusen	Home	3–3	Grifo 34', Suzuki 43', Ginter 86'	34,100	8th	
26	15 March 2026	17:30	Union Berlin	Home	0–1		33,200	8th	
27	22 March 2026	17:30	FC St. Pauli	Away	2–1	Matanović 65', 78'	29,546	8th	
28	4 April 2026	15:30	Bayern Munich	Home	2–3	Manzambi 46', Höler 71'	34,700	8th	
29	12 April 2026	19:30	Mainz 05	Away	1–0	Höler 47'	30,000	8th	
30	19 April 2026	15:30	1. FC Heidenheim	Home	2–1	Manzambi 24', Eggestein 83'	33,800	7th	
31	26 April 2026	17:30	Borussia Dortmund	Away	0–4		81,365	8th	
32	3 May 2026	19:30	VfL Wolfsburg	Home	1–1	Lienhart 75'	32,500	7th	
33	10 May 2026	15:30	Hamburger SV	Away	2–3	Matanović 16', 87'	57,000	7th	
34	16 May 2026	15:30	RB Leipzig	Home	4–1	Beste 24', Matanović 26', Ginter 47', Scherhant 75'	33,600	7th	

=== DFB-Pokal ===
DFB-Pokal match details
Round	Date	Time	Opponent	Venue	Result F–A	Scorers	Attendance	Ref.
First round	16 August 2025	18:00	Sportfreunde Lotte	Away	2–0	Dinkçi 43', Höler 69'	6,000	
Second round	29 October 2025	20:45	Fortuna Düsseldorf	Away	3–1	Matanović 1', Grifo 6', Scherhant 90+3'	36,112	
Round of 16	3 December 2025	18:00	Darmstadt 98	Home	2–0	Grifo 42' pen., Höler 69'	30,000	
Quarter-final	10 February 2025	20:45	Hertha BSC	Away	1–1 (a.e.t.) (5–4 p)	Suzuki 96'	56,743	
Semi-final	23 April 2025	20:45	VfB Stuttgart	Away	2–1 (a.e.t.)	Eggestein 28'	60,000	

=== UEFA Europa League ===
==== League phase ====
Pos	Team	Pld	W	D	L	GF	GA	GD	Pts	Qualification
5	(Portuguese Football Federation) Porto	8	5	2	1	13	7	+6	17 (Note: Away goals scored: Real Betis 5, Porto 3.)	Advance to round of 16 (seeded)
6	(Portuguese Football Federation) Braga	8	5	2	1	11	5	+6	17	Advance to round of 16 (seeded)
7	(German Football Association) SC Freiburg	8	5	2	1	10	4	+6	17	Advance to round of 16 (seeded)
8	(Italian Football Federation) Roma	8	5	1	2	13	6	+7	16	Advance to round of 16 (seeded)
9	(Royal Belgian Football Association) Genk	8	5	1	2	11	7	+4	16	Advance to knockout phase play-offs (seeded)

Source: UEFA
Rules for classification: League phase tiebreakers
Notes:

Europa League league phase match details
Round	Date	Time	Opponent	Venue	Result F–A	Scorers	Attendance	Ref.
1	24 September 2025	21:00	FC Basel	Home	2–1	Osterhage 31', Eggestein 56'	34,300	
2	2 October 2025	18:45	Bologna	Away	1–1	Adamu 57' pen.	24,428	
3	23 October 2025	21:00	FC Utrecht	Home	2–0	Suzuki 20', Grifo 45'	34,700	
4	6 November 2025	18:45	OGC Nice	Away	3–1	Manzambi 29', Grifo 39' pen., Scherhant 42'	15,274	
5	27 November 2025	18:45	Viktoria Plzeň	Away	0–0		10,182	
6	11 December 2025	21:00	RB Salzburg	Home	1–0	Lienhart 50'	31,100	
7	22 January 2026	18:45	Maccabi Tel Aviv	Home	1–0	Matanović 82'	27,600	
8	29 January 2026	21:00	Lille OSC	Away	0–1		22,500	

==== Knockout stage ====
Europa League knockout stage match details
Round	Date	Time	Opponent	Venue	Result F–A	Scorers	Attendance	Ref.
Round of 16 (first leg)	12 March 2026	21:00	Genk	Away	0–1		15,550	
Round of 16 (second leg)	19 March 2026	18:45	Genk	Home	5–1	Ginter 19', Matanović 25', Grifo 53', Suzuki 56', Eggestein 79'	33,000	
Quarter-final (first leg)	9 April 2026	21:00	Celta Vigo	Home	3–0	Grifo 10', Beste 32', Ginter 78'	32,600	
Quarter-final (second leg)	16 April 2026	18:45	Celta Vigo	Away	3–1	Matanović 33', Suzuki 39', 50'	21,981	
Semi-final (first leg)	30 April 2026	21:00	Braga	Away	1–2	Grifo 16'	27,161	
Semi-final (second leg)	7 May 2026	21:00	Braga	Home	3–1	Kübler 19', 72', Manzambi 41'	33,700	
Final	20 May 2026	21:00	Aston Villa	Neutral	0–3		37,324	

== Players ==
=== Transfers ===
==== In ====
Date	Pos.	Player	From	Fee	Ref.
1 July 2025	FW	Cyriaque Irié (CIV)	Troyes	€8,500,000	
1 July 2025	MF	Yuito Suzuki (JPN)	Brøndby IF	€8,000,000	
1 July 2025	FW	Derry Scherhant (GER)	Hertha BSC	€2,000,000	
1 July 2025	DF	Anthony Jung (GER)	Werder Bremen	Free transfer	
1 July 2025	DF	Philipp Treu (GER)	FC St. Pauli	€5,500,000	
9 July 2025	FW	Igor Matanović (CRO)	Eintracht Frankfurt	€6,700,000	

==== Out ====
Date	Pos.	Player	To	Fee	Ref.
30 June 2025	DF	Manuel Gulde (GER)		Retired	
1 July 2025	DF	Kenneth Schmidt (GER)	Fortuna Düsseldorf	Undisclosed	
16 July 2025	DF	Kiliann Sildillia (FRA)	PSV Eindhoven	€5,800,000	
6 August 2025	FW	Ritsu Doan (JPN)	Eintracht Frankfurt	€21,000,000	
20 August 2025	FW	Michael Gregoritsch (AUT)	Brøndby IF	Undisclosed	

==== Loans out ====
Date from	Pos.	Player	To	Date until	Ref.
1 July 2025	MF	Robert Wagner (GER)	Holstein Kiel	End of season	
8 August 2025	FW	Florent Muslija (KOS)	Fortuna Düsseldorf	End of season	
1 September 2025	MF	Merlin Röhl (GER)	Everton	End of season	
1 September 2025	MF	Noah Weißhaupt (GER)	Legia Warsaw	End of season	
