= 2026 FIFA World Cup Group B =

FIFA World Cup group

Group B of the 2026 FIFA World Cup took place from June 12 to 24, 2026. The group consisted of Canada (co-host), Bosnia and Herzegovina, Qatar, and Switzerland. This also marked the return of Bosnia and Herzegovina to the World Cup finals, with the Bosnians making their first appearance since 2014.

Switzerland began their World Cup campaign with a draw, and would go on to top the group after winning their next two group games. Canada finished as runners-up, thanks to their first ever World Cup win against Qatar, and both teams advanced to the round of 32.

Bosnia and Herzegovina finished in third based on goal difference, and their performance secured them as one of the eight best third-place teams, allowing them to progress to the round of 32. Qatar finished fourth after losing their second and third group games, which resulted in their elimination.

== Teams ==
Draw position	Team	Pot	Confederation	Method of qualification	Date of qualification	Finals appearance	Last appearance	Previous best performance	FIFA Rankings	
Draw position	Team	Pot	Confederation	Method of qualification	Date of qualification	Finals appearance	Last appearance	Previous best performance	November 2025 (Note: The rankings of November 2025 were used for seeding for the final draw.)	June 2026
B1	Canada	1	CONCACAF	Co-host	February 14, 2023 (Note: Although the United bid was selected on June 13, 2018, the automatic berths allocated to the hosts were not confirmed until a decision by the FIFA Council on February 14, 2023.)	3rd	2022	Group stage (1986, 2022)	27	30
B2	Bosnia and Herzegovina	4 (Note: As the identity of the UEFA second round Path A winner was not known at the time of the final draw, positions in the FIFA Rankings were not taken into account, and the placeholder in the draw was automatically seeded into pot 4.)	UEFA	UEFA second round Path A winner	March 31, 2026	2nd	2014	Group stage (2014)	71	64
B3	Qatar	3	AFC	AFC fourth round Group A winner	October 14, 2025	2nd	2022	Group stage (2022)	51	56
B4	Switzerland	2	UEFA	UEFA Group B winner	November 18, 2025	13th	2022	Quarterfinals (1934, 1938, 1954)	17	19

== Standings ==
Pos	Team	Pld	W	D	L	GF	GA	GD	Pts	Qualification
1	Switzerland	3	2	1	0	7	3	+4	7	Advance to knockout stage
2	Canada (H)	3	1	1	1	8	3	+5	4 (Note: Tied on head-to-head result (Canada 1–1 Bosnia and Herzegovina). Overall goal difference was used as the tiebreaker.)	Advance to knockout stage
3	Bosnia and Herzegovina	3	1	1	1	5	6	−1	4	Advance to knockout stage
4	Qatar	3	0	1	2	2	10	−8	1	

Source: FIFA
Rules for classification: Group stage tiebreakers
(H) Hosts
Notes:

In the round of 32:

- The winner of Group B, Switzerland, advanced to play the third-place team of Group J, Algeria.
- The runner-up of Group B, Canada, advanced to play the runner-up of Group A, South Africa.
- The third-place team of Group B, Bosnia and Herzegovina, advanced to play the winner of Group D, the United States, as one of the eight best third-place teams from the group stage.

== Matches ==
All times listed are local.

=== Canada vs Bosnia and Herzegovina ===
The two teams had never met before. This was the first senior men's World Cup match played in Canada.

Bosnia took the lead in the 21st minute when Jovo Lukić headed into the net from close range after Sead Kolašinac had flicked on Ivan Bašić's corner from the right. In the 78th minute it was 1–1 when substitute Cyle Larin scored with a deflected shot to the right of the net.

With a 1–1 draw, this marked the first time that Canada won a point at a World Cup, after they had been beaten in all three games in 1986 and then again in 2022.

June 12, 2026
3:00 p.m. UTC−4

Canada	1–1	Bosnia and Herzegovina
Larin 78'	(Note: "Canada vs Bosnia and Herzegovina | First Stage | FIFA World Cup 2026". FIFA. Retrieved June 12, 2026.; "Match Report – Group B – Canada v. Bosnia and Herzegovina". FIFA. June 12, 2026. Retrieved June 12, 2026.; "Post match summary report – Group B – Canada v. Bosnia and Herzegovina". FIFA. June 13, 2026. Retrieved June 28, 2026.)	Lukić 21'

BMO Field, Toronto
Attendance: 43,002
Referee: Facundo Tello (Argentina)

Canada	Bosnia and Herzegovina

GK	16	Maxime Crépeau
RB	2	Alistair Johnston	(yellow card) 11'
CB	4	Luc de Fougerolles	(yellow card) 53'
CB	13	Derek Cornelius
LB	22	Richie Laryea
RM	17	Tajon Buchanan		(substituted off) 61'
CM	7	Stephen Eustáquio (c)		(substituted off) 90+1'
CM	8	Ismaël Koné
LM	11	Liam Millar		(substituted off) 61'
CF	10	Jonathan David		(substituted off) 61'
CF	12	Tani Oluwaseyi		(substituted off) 76'
Substitutions:
FW	20	Ali Ahmed		(substituted on) 61'
FW	24	Promise David		(substituted on) 61'
MF	14	Jacob Shaffelburg		(substituted on) 61'
FW	9	Cyle Larin		(substituted on) 76'
MF	21	Jonathan Osorio		(substituted on) 90+1'
Manager:
(United States) Jesse Marsch

GK	1	Nikola Vasilj
RB	7	Amar Dedić
CB	18	Nikola Katić	(yellow card) 90+3'
CB	4	Tarik Muharemović
LB	5	Sead Kolašinac (c)		(substituted off) 83'
RM	20	Esmir Bajraktarević		(substituted off) 74'
CM	13	Ivan Bašić		(substituted off) 62'
CM	6	Benjamin Tahirović
LM	15	Amar Memić		(substituted off) 74'
CF	10	Ermedin Demirović	(yellow card) 44'
CF	25	Jovo Lukić	(yellow card) 45+1'	(substituted off) 62'
Substitutions:
MF	8	Armin Gigović		(substituted on) 62'
FW	9	Samed Baždar		(substituted on) 62'
MF	14	Ivan Šunjić		(substituted on) 74'
FW	19	Kerim Alajbegović		(substituted on) 74'
MF	17	Dženis Burnić		(substituted on) 83'
Manager:
Sergej Barbarez

Man of the Match:
Ismaël Koné (Canada)

Assistant referees:
Juan Pablo Belatti (Argentina)
Gabriel Chade (Argentina)
Fourth official:
Khalid Al-Turais (Saudi Arabia)
Reserve assistant referee:
Mohammed Al-Bakry (Saudi Arabia)
Video assistant referee:
Hernán Mastrángelo (Argentina)
Assistant video assistant referee:
Antonio García (Uruguay)
Support video assistant referee:
Tatiana Guzmán (Nicaragua)

=== Qatar vs Switzerland ===
The teams previously met in a 2018 friendly, which ended in a 1–0 win for Qatar.

In the 17th minute, Switzerland were awarded a penalty when Remo Freuler was fouled by the diving Qatar goalkeeper Mahmud Abunada. Television replays appeared to show Freuler had strayed marginally offside in the build-up but the penalty was awarded and was scored by Breel Embolo with a low finish to the left. In the 94th minute, Qatar scored an equalizer when Switzerland defender Miro Muheim under pressure from Boualem Khoukhi, headed a Homam Ahmed cross from the left past his own goalkeeper to the right of the net with the match finishing 1–1.

This was the first time Qatar earned a point at the World Cup, after losing three consecutive matches as the host nation in 2022.

June 13, 2026
12:00 p.m. UTC−7

Qatar	1–1	Switzerland
Muheim 90+4' (o.g.)	(Note: "Qatar vs Switzerland | First Stage | FIFA World Cup 2026". FIFA. Retrieved June 13, 2026.; "Match Report – Group B – Qatar v. Switzerland". FIFA. June 13, 2026. Retrieved June 13, 2026.; "Post match summary report – Group B – Qatar v. Switzerland". FIFA. June 13, 2026. Retrieved June 14, 2026.)	Embolo 17' (pen.)

Levi's Stadium, Santa Clara
Attendance: 67,966
Referee: Saíd Martínez (Honduras)

Qatar	Switzerland

GK	1	Mahmud Abunada	(yellow card) 14'
RB	13	Ayoub Al-Oui		(substituted off) 60'
CB	2	Pedro Miguel
CB	16	Boualem Khoukhi (c)
LB	14	Homam Ahmed
CM	5	Jassem Gaber	(yellow card) 23'	(substituted off) 60'
CM	4	Issa Laye
RW	8	Edmilson Junior		(substituted off) 88'
AM	23	Assim Madibo		(substituted off) 79'
LW	11	Akram Afif
CF	15	Yusuf Abdurisag		(substituted off) 60'
Substitutions:
MF	20	Ahmed Fathy		(substituted on) 60'
MF	12	Karim Boudiaf		(substituted on) 60'
FW	7	Ahmed Alaaeldin		(substituted on) 60'
MF	26	Mohamed Manai		(substituted on) 79'
FW	10	Hassan Al-Haydos		(substituted on) 88'
Manager:
(Spain) Julen Lopetegui

GK	1	Gregor Kobel
RB	6	Denis Zakaria	(yellow card) 42'
CB	5	Manuel Akanji
CB	4	Nico Elvedi
LB	13	Ricardo Rodriguez		(substituted off) 89'
CM	20	Michel Aebischer		(substituted off) 66'
CM	10	Granit Xhaka (c)
CM	8	Remo Freuler		(substituted off) 89'
RF	11	Dan Ndoye		(substituted off) 66'
CF	7	Breel Embolo
LF	17	Rubén Vargas		(substituted off) 79'
Substitutions:
MF	22	Fabian Rieder		(substituted on) 66'
MF	9	Johan Manzambi		(substituted on) 66'
FW	23	Zeki Amdouni		(substituted on) 79'
MF	14	Ardon Jashari		(substituted on) 89'
DF	2	Miro Muheim		(substituted on) 89'
Manager:
Murat Yakin

Man of the Match:
Mahmud Abunada (Qatar)

Assistant referees:
Walter López (Honduras)
Christian Ramírez (Honduras)
Fourth official:
Oshane Nation (Jamaica)
Reserve assistant referee:
Caleb Wales (Trinidad and Tobago)
Video assistant referee:
Guillermo Pacheco (Mexico)
Assistant video assistant referee:
Erick Miranda (Mexico)
Support video assistant referee:
Leodán González (Uruguay)

=== Switzerland vs Bosnia and Herzegovina ===
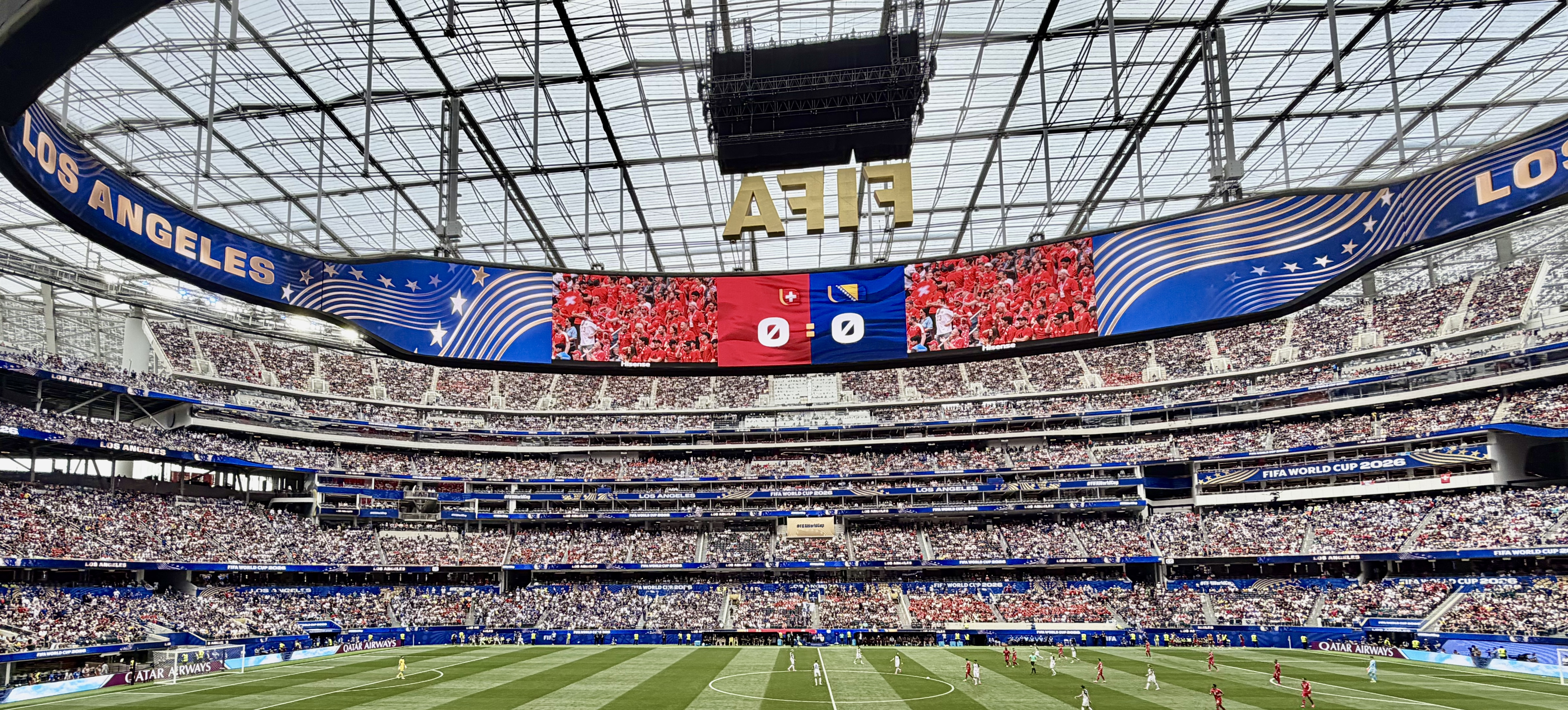
Midway in the Switzerland vs Bosnia and Herzegovina match

The teams had only met in a 2016 friendly, which ended in a 2–0 win for Bosnia.

As for Bosnia, this was their biggest defeat in a World Cup match since their debut in 2014.

June 18, 2026
12:00 p.m. UTC−7

Switzerland	4–1	Bosnia and Herzegovina
Manzambi 74', 90'; Vargas 84'; Xhaka 90+7' (pen.)	(Note: "Switzerland vs Bosnia and Herzegovina | First Stage | FIFA World Cup 2026". FIFA. Retrieved June 18, 2026.; "Match Report – Group B – Switzerland v. Bosnia and Herzegovina". FIFA. June 18, 2026. Retrieved June 18, 2026.; "Post match summary report – Group B – Switzerland v. Bosnia and Herzegovina". FIFA. June 18, 2026. Retrieved June 19, 2026.)	Mahmić 90+3'

SoFi Stadium, Inglewood
Attendance: 70,026
Referee: João Pinheiro (Portugal)

Switzerland	Bosnia and Herzegovina

GK	1	Gregor Kobel
RB	3	Silvan Widmer		(substituted off) 86'
CB	4	Nico Elvedi	(yellow card) 65'
CB	5	Manuel Akanji
LB	13	Ricardo Rodriguez
CM	20	Michel Aebischer		(substituted off) 72'
CM	10	Granit Xhaka (c)
CM	8	Remo Freuler
RF	11	Dan Ndoye		(substituted off) 72'
CF	7	Breel Embolo		(substituted off) 89'
LF	22	Fabian Rieder		(substituted off) 72'
Substitutions:
MF	15	Djibril Sow		(substituted on) 72'
FW	17	Rubén Vargas		(substituted on) 72'
MF	9	Johan Manzambi		(substituted on) 72'
DF	25	Luca Jaquez		(substituted on) 86'
FW	26	Cedric Itten		(substituted on) 89'
Manager:
Murat Yakin

GK	1	Nikola Vasilj
RB	7	Amar Dedić	(yellow card) 59'
CB	18	Nikola Katić
CB	4	Tarik Muharemović	(red card) 80'
LB	5	Sead Kolašinac
RM	15	Amar Memić
CM	14	Ivan Šunjić		(substituted off) 85'
CM	6	Benjamin Tahirović		(substituted off) 63'
LM	19	Kerim Alajbegović		(substituted off) 90+1'
CF	10	Ermedin Demirović		(substituted off) 85'
CF	11	Edin Džeko (c)	(yellow card) 61'	(substituted off) 63'
Substitutions:
MF	13	Ivan Bašić		(substituted on) 63'
MF	20	Esmir Bajraktarević		(substituted on) 63'
FW	25	Jovo Lukić		(substituted on) 85'
MF	16	Amir Hadžiahmetović		(substituted on) 85'
MF	26	Ermin Mahmić		(substituted on) 90+1'
Manager:
Sergej Barbarez

Man of the Match:
Johan Manzambi (Switzerland)

Assistant referees:
Bruno Jesus (Portugal)
Luciano Maia (Portugal)
Fourth official:
Yusuke Araki (Japan)
Reserve assistant referee:
Jun Mihara (Japan)
Video assistant referee:
Dennis Higler (Netherlands)
Assistant video assistant referee:
Tomasz Kwiatkowski (Poland)
Support video assistant referee:
Fu Ming (China)

=== Canada vs Qatar ===
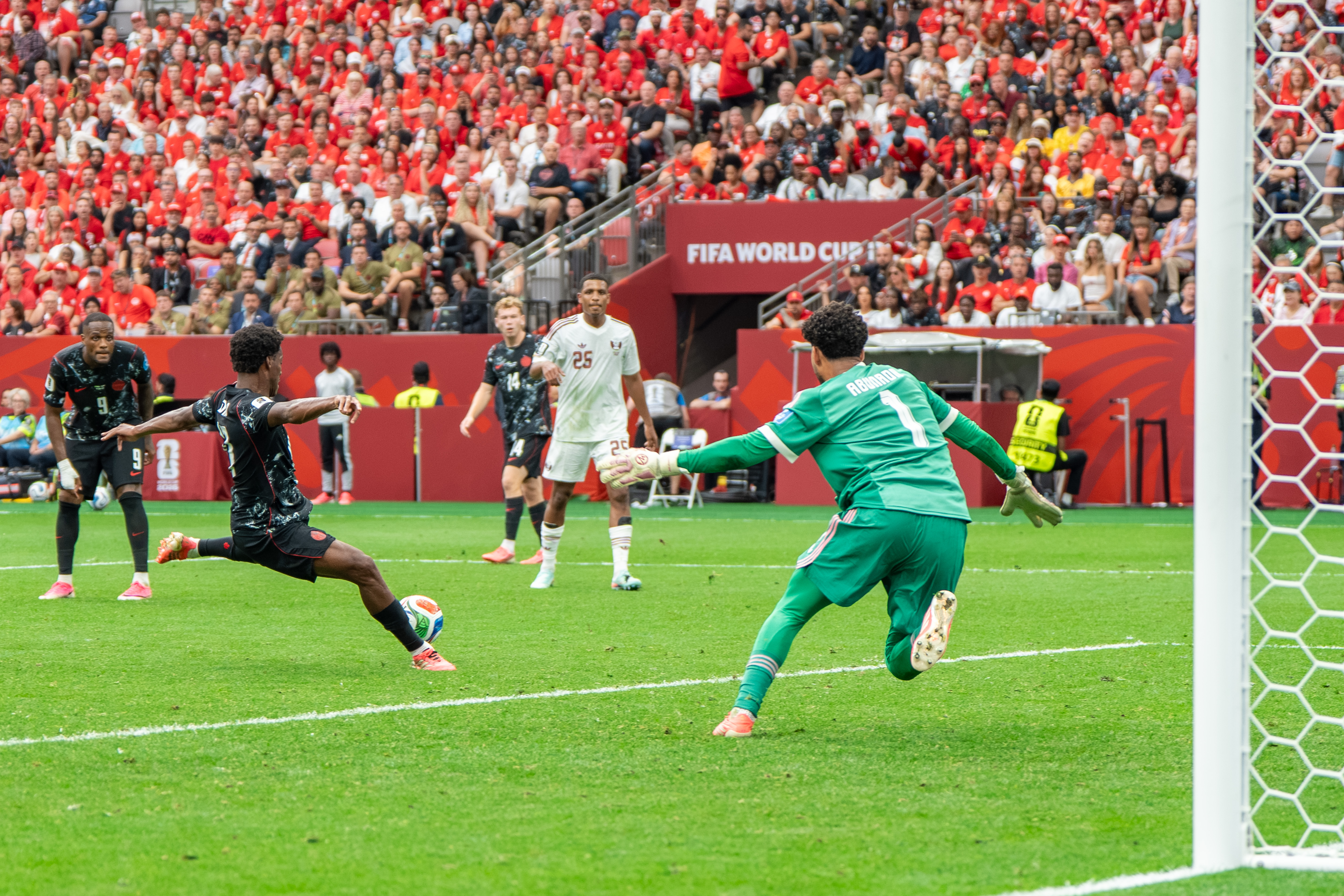
Jonathan David scoring one of his three goals, becoming the second North American player to score a World Cup hat-trick.

The teams previously faced each other once in 2022, a friendly won 2–0 by Canada.

This was the first World Cup match won by Canada in its history, and the biggest winning margin by a nation outside of UEFA or CONMEBOL in World Cup history.

Additionally, Jonathan David became the first North American player to score a World Cup hat-trick since Bert Patenaude did so for the United States against Paraguay in 1930, and the first player to score a World Cup hat-trick on home soil since Geoff Hurst did so for England against West Germany in the 1966 final. He also became the second player to score a hat-trick in the tournament, after Lionel Messi did so in Argentina's opening match against Algeria.

June 18, 2026
3:00 p.m. UTC−7

Canada	6–0	Qatar
Larin 16'; J. David 29', 45+3', 90+2'; Saliba 64'; Manai 75' (o.g.)	(Note: "Canada vs Qatar | First Stage | FIFA World Cup 2026". FIFA. Retrieved June 19, 2026.; "Match Report – Group B – Canada v. Qatar". FIFA. June 19, 2026. Retrieved June 19, 2026.; "Post match summary report – Group B – Canada v. Qatar". FIFA. June 18, 2026. Retrieved June 19, 2026.)

BC Place, Vancouver
Attendance: 52,497
Referee: Cristián Garay (Chile)

Canada	Qatar

GK	16	Maxime Crépeau
RB	2	Alistair Johnston
CB	4	Luc de Fougerolles		(substituted off) 71'
CB	13	Derek Cornelius	(yellow card) 9'	(substituted off) 46'
LB	22	Richie Laryea
RM	17	Tajon Buchanan		(substituted off) 83'
CM	8	Ismaël Koné		(substituted off) 56'
CM	7	Stephen Eustáquio (c)
LM	20	Ali Ahmed		(substituted off) 71'
CF	10	Jonathan David
CF	9	Cyle Larin
Substitutions:
DF	15	Moïse Bombito		(substituted on) 46'
MF	25	Nathan Saliba		(substituted on) 56'
MF	14	Jacob Shaffelburg		(substituted on) 71'
FW	12	Tani Oluwaseyi		(substituted on) 71'
DF	23	Niko Sigur		(substituted on) 83'
Manager:
(United States) Jesse Marsch

GK	1	Mahmud Abunada
RB	13	Ayoub Al-Oui
CB	2	Pedro Miguel
CB	16	Boualem Khoukhi (c)
LB	14	Homam Ahmed	(red card) 33'
CM	5	Jassem Gaber		(substituted off) 46'
CM	23	Assim Madibo	(red card) 51'
CM	4	Issa Laye
RF	8	Edmilson Junior		(substituted off) 46'
CF	15	Yusuf Abdurisag		(substituted off) 40'
LF	11	Akram Afif		(substituted off) 59'
Substitutions:
DF	18	Sultan Al-Brake		(substituted on) 40'
MF	26	Mohamed Manai		(substituted on) 46'
MF	20	Ahmed Fathy	(yellow card) 62'	(substituted on) 46' (substituted off) 87'
DF	25	Al-Hashmi Al-Hussain		(substituted on) 59'
DF	3	Lucas Mendes		(substituted on) 87'
Manager:
(Spain) Julen Lopetegui

Man of the Match:
Jonathan David (Canada)

Assistant referees:
José Retamal (Chile)
Miguel Rocha (Chile)
Fourth official:
Kevin Ortega (Peru)
Reserve assistant referee:
Michael Orué (Peru)
Video assistant referee:
Juan Lara (Chile)
Assistant video assistant referee:
Rodolpho Toski (Brazil)
Support video assistant referee:
Nicolás Gallo (Colombia)

=== Switzerland vs Canada ===
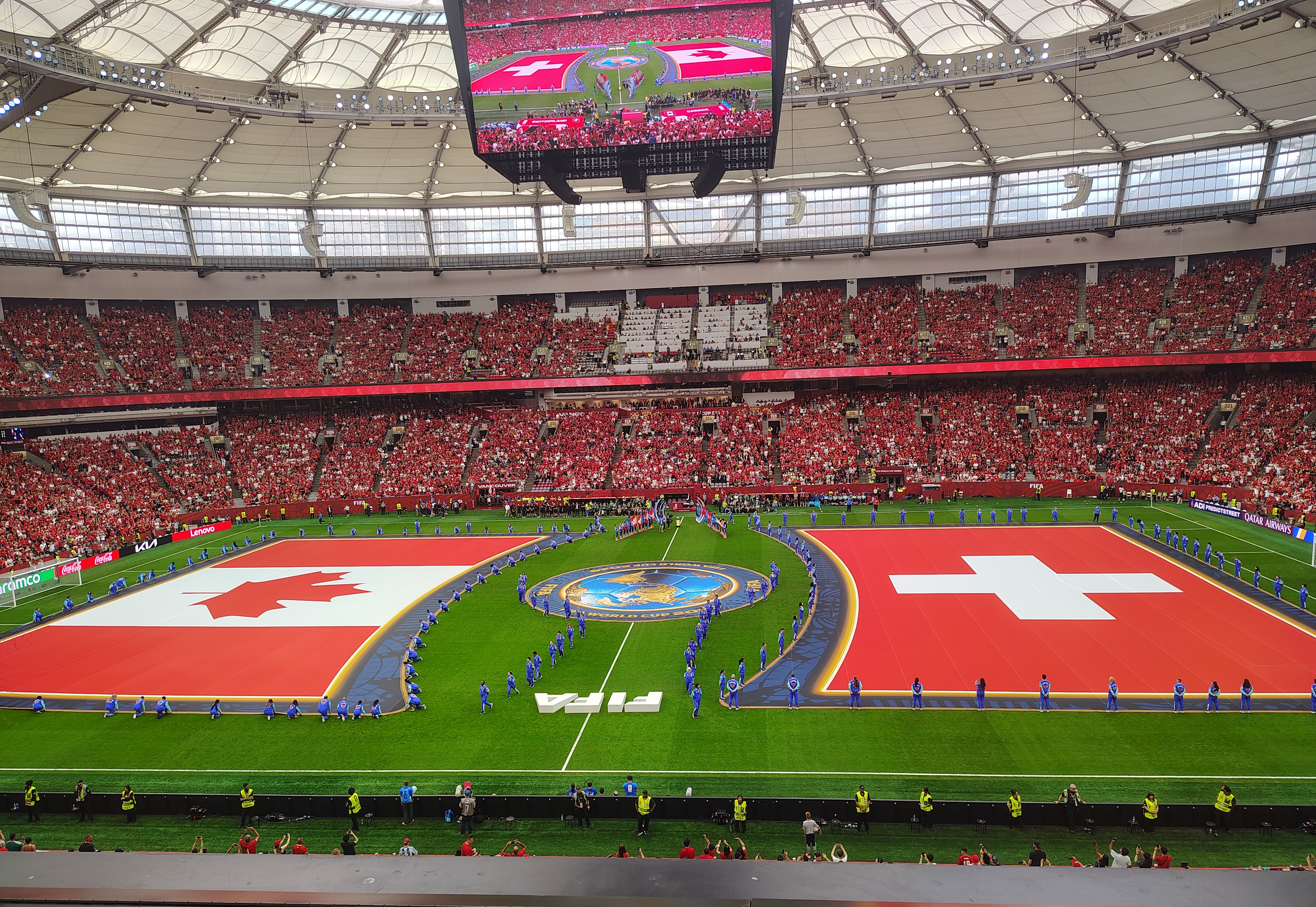
Pre-match ceremony between Switzerland and Canada.

The teams' only meeting took place in 2002, a friendly won 3–1 by Canada.

With this fixture, co-hosts Canada finished as Group B runners-up behind Switzerland, who secured the top spot after handing the Canadians their only defeat. A day later, fellow co-hosts the United States also suffered a setback, losing 3–2 to already-eliminated Turkey in Group D in Los Angeles. This leaves Mexico as the only co-host to remain undefeated, having won all of their group stage matches.

The loss forced Canada to play against Group A runners-up South Africa outside of its borders for the round of 32 in Los Angeles, as failing to top the group cost them a guaranteed spot on home soil, a match which was also played in Vancouver.

June 24, 2026
12:00 p.m. UTC−7

Switzerland	2–1	Canada
Vargas 46'; Manzambi 57'	(Note: "Switzerland vs Canada | First Stage | FIFA World Cup 2026". FIFA. Retrieved June 24, 2026.; "Match Report – Group B – Switzerland v. Canada". FIFA. June 24, 2026. Retrieved June 24, 2026.; "Post match summary report – Group B – Switzerland v. Canada". FIFA. June 25, 2026. Retrieved June 25, 2026.)	P. David 76'

BC Place, Vancouver
Attendance: 52,497
Referee: Ramon Abatti (Brazil)

Switzerland	Canada

GK	1	Gregor Kobel
RB	25	Luca Jaquez		(substituted off) 74'
CB	4	Nico Elvedi
CB	5	Manuel Akanji
LB	13	Ricardo Rodriguez
RM	15	Djibril Sow		(substituted off) 74'
CM	8	Remo Freuler
CM	10	Granit Xhaka (c)	(yellow card) 32'
LM	17	Rubén Vargas		(substituted off) 80'
CF	7	Breel Embolo		(substituted off) 85'
CF	9	Johan Manzambi		(substituted off) 85'
Substitutions:
DF	3	Silvan Widmer		(substituted on) 74'
MF	20	Michel Aebischer		(substituted on) 74'
FW	11	Dan Ndoye		(substituted on) 80'
MF	16	Christian Fassnacht		(substituted on) 85'
FW	26	Cedric Itten		(substituted on) 85'
Manager:
Murat Yakin

GK	16	Maxime Crépeau
RB	2	Alistair Johnston
CB	4	Luc de Fougerolles
CB	13	Derek Cornelius
LB	22	Richie Laryea		(substituted off) 83'
RM	17	Tajon Buchanan		(substituted off) 74'
CM	25	Nathan Saliba
CM	6	Mathieu Choinière		(substituted off) 58'
LM	20	Ali Ahmed		(substituted off) 58'
CF	10	Jonathan David (c)
CF	9	Cyle Larin	(yellow card) 32'	(substituted off) 58'
Substitutions:
MF	7	Stephen Eustáquio		(substituted on) 58'
MF	11	Liam Millar	(yellow card) 87'	(substituted on) 58'
FW	12	Tani Oluwaseyi		(substituted on) 58'
FW	24	Promise David		(substituted on) 74'
MF	14	Jacob Shaffelburg		(substituted on) 83'
Manager:
(United States) Jesse Marsch

Man of the Match:
Johan Manzambi (Switzerland)

Assistant referees:
Danilo Manis (Brazil)
Rafael Alves (Brazil)
Fourth official:
Kevin Ortega (Peru)
Reserve assistant referee:
Michael Orué (Peru)
Video assistant referee:
Juan Soto (Venezuela)
Assistant video assistant referee:
Antonio García (Uruguay)
Support video assistant referee:
Jarred Gillett (England)

=== Bosnia and Herzegovina vs Qatar ===
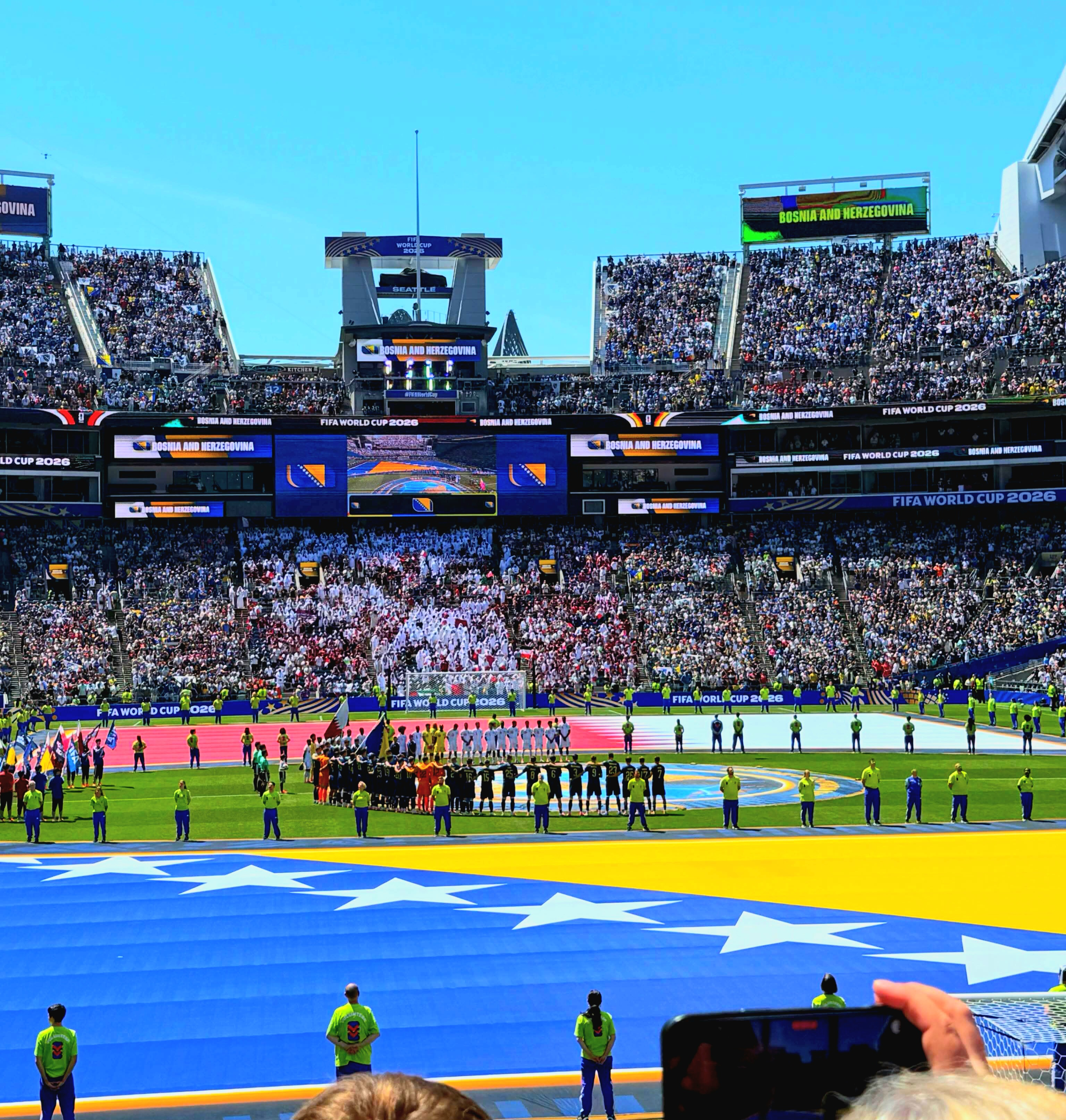
Pre-match ceremony between Bosnia and Herzegovina and Qatar

The teams had met twice: Qatar won 2–0 in 2000, and their most recent meeting was a 1–1 draw in 2010.

Bosnia and Herzegovina's three-goal victory secured their first-ever spot in the round of 32. Meanwhile, Qatar was eliminated from the group stage for the second consecutive World Cup, following their 2022 exit as hosts.

June 24, 2026
12:00 p.m. UTC−7

Bosnia and Herzegovina	3–1	Qatar
Alajbegović 29'; Abunada 34' (o.g.); Mahmić 80'	(Note: "Bosnia and Herzegovina vs Qatar | First Stage | FIFA World Cup 2026". FIFA. Retrieved June 24, 2026.; "Match Report – Group B – Bosnia and Herzegovina v. Qatar". FIFA. June 24, 2026. Retrieved June 24, 2026.; "Post match summary report – Group B – Bosnia and Herzegovina v. Qatar". FIFA. June 25, 2026. Retrieved June 25, 2026.)	Al-Haydos 42'

Lumen Field, Seattle
Attendance: 66,925
Referee: Jesús Valenzuela (Venezuela)

Bosnia and Herzegovina	Qatar

GK	1	Nikola Vasilj
RB	24	Arjan Malić		(substituted off) 46'
CB	18	Nikola Katić		(substituted off) 63'
CB	21	Stjepan Radeljić
LB	5	Sead Kolašinac
RM	20	Esmir Bajraktarević
CM	14	Ivan Šunjić		(substituted off) 46'
CM	13	Ivan Bašić
LM	19	Kerim Alajbegović		(substituted off) 82'
CF	10	Ermedin Demirović
CF	11	Edin Džeko (c)		(substituted off) 63'
Substitutions:
MF	15	Amar Memić		(substituted on) 46'
MF	6	Benjamin Tahirović		(substituted on) 46'
DF	3	Dennis Hadžikadunić		(substituted on) 63'
MF	26	Ermin Mahmić	(yellow card) 82'	(substituted on) 63'
MF	17	Dženis Burnić		(substituted on) 82'
Manager:
Sergej Barbarez

GK	1	Mahmud Abunada
RB	2	Pedro Miguel
CB	16	Boualem Khoukhi
CB	4	Issa Laye
LB	18	Sultan Al-Brake
DM	20	Ahmed Fathy	(yellow card) 78'	(substituted off) 79'
CM	5	Jassem Gaber		(substituted off) 46'
CM	12	Karim Boudiaf		(substituted off) 72'
RF	8	Edmilson Junior		(substituted off) 79'
CF	11	Akram Afif
LF	10	Hassan Al-Haydos (c)		(substituted off) 55'
Substitutions:
MF	6	Abdulaziz Hatem		(substituted on) 46'
FW	17	Ahmed Al-Ganehi		(substituted on) 55'
FW	19	Almoez Ali		(substituted on) 72'
FW	7	Ahmed Alaaeldin		(substituted on) 79'
MF	26	Mohamed Manai		(substituted on) 79'
Manager:
(Spain) Julen Lopetegui

Man of the Match:
Kerim Alajbegović (Bosnia and Herzegovina)

Assistant referees:
Jorge Urrego (Venezuela)
Tulio Moreno (Venezuela)
Fourth official:
Yusuke Araki (Japan)
Reserve assistant referee:
Jun Mihara (Japan)
Video assistant referee:
Tatiana Guzmán (Nicaragua)
Assistant video assistant referee:
Leodán González (Uruguay)
Support video assistant referee:
Shaun Evans (Australia)

== Discipline ==
The team conduct ("fair play") score would have been used as a tiebreaker if the head-to-head and overall records of teams were tied. It would also be used as a tiebreaker for the third-place ranking between groups if the overall records of teams were tied. The score was calculated based on yellow and red cards received by players and team officials in all group matches as follows:

- yellow card: −1 point;
- indirect red card (second yellow card): −3 points;
- direct red card: −4 points;
- yellow card and direct red card: −5 points;

Only one of the above deductions could be applied to a player or team official in a single match.

Team	Match 1				Match 2				Match 3				Score
Team	Booked	(yellow card) (yellow-red card)	Sent off (straight red)	(yellow card) (red card)	Booked	(yellow card) (yellow-red card)	Sent off (straight red)	(yellow card) (red card)	Booked	(yellow card) (yellow-red card)	Sent off (straight red)	(yellow card) (red card)	Score
Switzerland	1				1				1				−3
Canada	2				1				2				−5
Bosnia and Herzegovina	3				2		1		1				−10
Qatar	2				1		2		1				−12
