= Rubén Vargas =

Swiss footballer (born 1998)

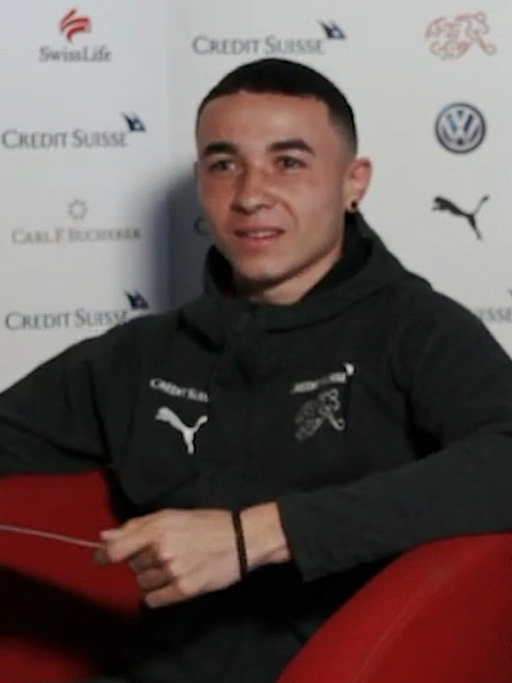
- Vargas with Switzerland in 2019

Personal information
- Full name: Rubén Estephan Vargas Martínez
- Date of birth: 5 August 1998 (age 28)
- Place of birth: Adligenswil, Switzerland
- Height: 1.77 m (5 ft 10 in)
- Positions: Winger; attacking midfielder

Team information
- Current team: Sevilla
- Number: 11

Youth career
- 2007–2008: FC Adligenswil
- 2008–2014: Luzern
- 2014–2015: Kriens
- 2015–2017: Luzern

Senior career*
Years	Team	Apps	(Gls)
2016–2017	Luzern II	25	(17)
2017–2019	Luzern	50	(9)
2019–2025	FC Augsburg	154	(20)
2025–	Sevilla	41	(5)

International career^{‡}
2018–2019	Switzerland U20	4	(2)
2018–2019	Switzerland U21	6	(2)
2019–	Switzerland	67	(13)
- * Club domestic league appearances and goals as of 23:15, 21 November 2026 (UTC) ‡ National team caps and goals as of 11:45, 12 July 2026 (UTC)

Rubén Estephan Vargas Martínez (born 5 August 1998) is a Swiss professional footballer who plays as a winger or attacking midfielder for La Liga club Sevilla and the Switzerland national team.

== Club career ==
Vargas made his professional debut for FC Luzern in a 1–1 tie with FC Zürich on 27 August 2017.

He signed a five-year contract with FC Augsburg in June 2019, becoming the first Bundesliga player of Dominican descent. He scored his first goal in his second match, against Union Berlin on 24 August. On 25 July 2021, he signed a four-year contract extension with Augsburg, running until June 2025.

On 9 January 2025, Vargas signed a contract with Spanish club Sevilla until 2029.

== International career ==
Vargas made his Switzerland senior team debut on 8 September 2019, in a UEFA Euro 2020 qualifier against Gibraltar. He replaced Granit Xhaka in the 74th minute. On 18 November, he scored his first senior international goal against the same opposition in a 6–1 win.

In 2021, Vargas scored a crucial penalty for Switzerland during UEFA Euro 2020 in a shootout against France on 28 June in the round of 16, helping Switzerland qualify for the quarter-final. However, Vargas, later missed a penalty for Switzerland during the shoot-out against Spain on 2 July in the quarter-final, which they would end up losing.

Vargas started all four of Switzerland's matches at the 2022 FIFA World Cup, assisting Remo Freuler's winning goal in the Group G decider against Serbia on 2 December.

On 7 June 2024, Vargas was named in Switzerland's squad for UEFA Euro 2024. He started the team's opening match, playing 74 minutes of a 3–1 win over Hungary in Cologne. He was awarded player of the match for Switzerland's round of 16 game against defending champions Italy, both scoring and assisting a goal in a 2–0 victory.

On 20 May 2026, Vargas was selected in the 26-man squad for the 2026 FIFA World Cup. He scored his first World Cup goals against Bosnia and Herzegovina and Canada in the group stage. He scored the winning penalty during the shootout against Colombia in the round of 16, securing his nation's place in the quarter-finals for the first time since 1954.

== Personal life ==
Vargas was born in Adligenswil, Switzerland, to a Dominican father named Victor Vargas alias "Filete", and a Swiss mother, and holds citizenship of both nations. He is a Christian.

== Career statistics ==
=== Club ===
As of match played 21 November 2026

Appearances and goals by club, season and competition
Club	Season	League			National cup (Note: Includes Swiss Cup, DFB-Pokal, Copa del Rey)		Europe		Total	
Club	Season	Division	Apps	Goals	Apps	Goals	Apps	Goals	Apps	Goals
Luzern II	2015–16	Swiss 1. Liga	6	3	—		—		6	3
Luzern II	2016–17	Swiss 1. Liga	10	9	—		—		10	9
Luzern II	2017–18	Swiss 1. Liga	9	5	—		—		9	5
Luzern II	Total		25	17	—		—		25	17
Luzern	2017–18	Swiss Super League	19	1	1	1	0	0	20	2
Luzern	2018–19	Swiss Super League	31	8	4	1	2 (Note: Appearances in UEFA Europa League)	0	37	9
Luzern	Total		50	9	5	2	2	0	57	11
FC Augsburg	2019–20	Bundesliga	33	6	0	0	—		33	6
FC Augsburg	2020–21	Bundesliga	30	6	2	1	—		32	7
FC Augsburg	2021–22	Bundesliga	29	1	1	1	—		30	2
FC Augsburg	2022–23	Bundesliga	23	3	1	0	—		24	3
FC Augsburg	2023–24	Bundesliga	31	4	1	0	—		32	4
FC Augsburg	2024–25	Bundesliga	8	0	2	0	—		10	0
FC Augsburg	Total		154	20	7	2	—		161	22
Sevilla	2024–25	La Liga	11	2	—		—		11	2
Sevilla	2025–26	La Liga	24	3	1	0	—		25	3
Sevilla	2026–27	La Liga	6	0	1	1	—		7	1
Sevilla	Total		41	5	2	1	—		43	6
Career total			270	51	14	5	2	0	286	56

=== International ===
As of match played 11 July 2026

Appearances and goals by national team and year
National team	Year	Apps	Goals
Switzerland	2019	3	1
Switzerland	2020	5	0
Switzerland	2021	14	3
Switzerland	2022	9	0
Switzerland	2023	9	3
Switzerland	2024	10	1
Switzerland	2025	8	3
Switzerland	2026	9	2
Total		67	13

Scores and results list Switzerland's goal tally first.

List of international goals scored by Rubén Vargas
No.	Date	Venue	Cap	Opponent	Score	Result	Competition
1	18 November 2019	Victoria Stadium, Gibraltar	3	Gibraltar	2–0	6–1	UEFA Euro 2020 qualifying
2	31 March 2021	Kybunpark, St. Gallen, Switzerland	11	Finland	2–2	3–2	Friendly
3	1 September 2021	St. Jakob-Park, Basel, Switzerland	17	Greece	2–1	2–1	Friendly
4	15 November 2021	Swissporarena, Lucerne, Switzerland	22	Bulgaria	2–0	4–0	2022 FIFA World Cup qualification
5	28 March 2023	Stade de Genève, Geneva, Switzerland	33	Israel	1–0	3–0	UEFA Euro 2024 qualifying
6	15 November 2023	Pancho Arena, Felcsút, Hungary	38	Israel	1–0	1–1	UEFA Euro 2024 qualifying
7	18 November 2023	St. Jakob-Park, Basel, Switzerland	39	Kosovo	1–0	1–1	UEFA Euro 2024 qualifying
8	29 June 2024	Olympiastadion, Berlin, Germany	47	Italy	2–0	2–0	UEFA Euro 2024
9	25 March 2025	Kybunpark, St. Gallen, Switzerland	52	Luxembourg	1–0	3–1	Friendly
10	25 March 2025	Kybunpark, St. Gallen, Switzerland	52	Luxembourg	3–0	3–1	Friendly
11	18 November 2025	Fadil Vokrri Stadium, Pristina, Kosovo	58	Kosovo	1–0	1–1	2026 FIFA World Cup qualification
12	18 June 2026	SoFi Stadium, Inglewood, United States	63	Bosnia and Herzegovina	2–0	4–1	2026 FIFA World Cup
13	24 June 2026	BC Place, Vancouver, Canada	64	Canada	1–0	2–1	2026 FIFA World Cup
