= Johan Manzambi =

Swiss footballer (born 2005)

Personal information
- Full name: Johan Kula Manzambi
- Date of birth: 14 October 2005 (age 21)
- Place of birth: Geneva, Switzerland
- Height: 1.82 m (6 ft 0 in)
- Position: Midfielder

Team information
- Current team: Aston Villa
- Number: 44

Youth career
- –2023: Servette
- 2023–2024: SC Freiburg

Senior career*
Years	Team	Apps	(Gls)
2024–2025	SC Freiburg II	20	(3)
2024–2026	SC Freiburg	38	(7)
2026–	Aston Villa	8	(2)

International career^{‡}
2023	Switzerland U18	7	(0)
2023–2024	Switzerland U19	11	(0)
2024	Switzerland U20	5	(0)
2025	Switzerland U21	2	(1)
2025–	Switzerland	20	(7)
- * Club domestic league appearances and goals as of 21 November 2026 ‡ National team caps and goals as of 6 October 2026

Johan Kula Manzambi (born 14 October 2005) is a Swiss professional footballer who plays as a midfielder for Premier League club Aston Villa and the Switzerland national team.

Manzambi is a product of the Servette and SC Freiburg academies. He was a key player in Freiburg's run to the 2026 UEFA Europa League final and was named Europa League Young Player of the Season. He transferred to Aston Villa in July 2026.

Manzambi was ever-present in Switzerland's 2026 FIFA World Cup qualifiers, and played a key role in their run to the quarter-finals of the final tournament, becoming the youngest player in over 60 years to record five goal contributions (three goals and two assists) in a single World Cup campaign.

== Early life ==
Manzambi was born on 14 October 2005 in Geneva, Switzerland. He started playing football at the age of four. His parents are from Angola and the Democratic Republic of the Congo.

== Club career ==
=== Freiburg ===
As a youth player, Manzambi joined the youth academy of Swiss side Servette. In 2023, he joined the youth academy of German Bundesliga side SC Freiburg and was promoted to the club's reserve team in 2024 before being promoted to the first team the same year. On 21 August 2024, he debuted for them during a 3–0 away loss to 1. FC Heidenheim in the league. He scored his first goal for the club in a 2–1 away win over Borussia Mönchengladbach on 12 April 2025.

Manzambi became a regular starting player for Freiburg in the 2025–26 season, making 47 appearances and recording 16 goal involvements in all competitions.

On 7 May 2026, he scored the second goal for Freiburg in a 3–1 win over Braga in the Europa League semi-final second leg, helping his club reach the final by winning 4–3 on aggregate. He was eventually named the Europa League Young Player of the Season after the team finished runner-up to Aston Villa.

=== Aston Villa ===
On 17 July 2026, Manzambi signed for Premier League club Aston Villa, for an undisclosed fee. It was reported to be a club record transfer fee of £59.5 million, add-ons included. Manzambi missed the start of the Premier League season due to an injury suffered at the World Cup and didn't make his debut until 12 September, in a 2–1 defeat to Nottingham Forest. Manzambi scored his first goal for Aston Villa on his first start, a 2–3 league victory over Tottenham Hotspur on 19 September.

== International career ==
After being capped for Switzerland at every level from under-18 to under-21, Manzambi made his debut for the for Switzerland senior team in a 4–2 win over Mexico on 7 June 2025. Three days later, he scored his first senior international goal for in a 4–0 friendly win over the United States. He went on to appear in all six of the team's 2026 FIFA World Cup qualifiers, scoring in both the home and away fixtures against Sweden.

In May 2026, Manzambi was named to Switzerland's squad for the 2026 FIFA World Cup. He made his World Cup debut as a substitute for Dan Ndoye in the team's opening Group B fixture against Qatar. On 18 June, he scored his first two World Cup goals in a 4–1 win against Bosnia and Herzegovina, becoming the youngest Swiss player to score a brace at a FIFA World Cup at 20 years and 247 days and the only Swiss player to score multiple goals coming off the bench as a substitute. In addition, he became the youngest substitute ever to score a brace in a World Cup match, surpassing the previous record set by Nelson Cuevas. A week later, on 24 June, he scored a goal, provided an assist and earned Man of the Match award in a 2–1 win over hosts Canada, helping his team finish top of their group. He later provided an assist in a 2–0 Round of 32 victory over Algeria, becoming the youngest player in over 60 years to record five goal contributions (three goals and two assists) in a single World Cup tournament, at 20 years and 261 days old. He sustained a knee injury during a training session before the Round of 16 match against Colombia, which ruled him out for the remainder of the tournament.

== Style of play ==
Manzambi plays as a midfielder and is right-footed. Swiss newspaper Blick wrote in 2024 that he is a "fast box-to-box player who is dynamic and energetic".

== Career statistics ==
=== Club ===
As of match played 21 November 2026

Appearances and goals by club, season and competition
Club	Season	League			National cup (Note: Includes DFB-Pokal, FA Cup)		League cup (Note: Includes EFL Cup)		Europe		Other		Total	
Club	Season	Division	Apps	Goals	Apps	Goals	Apps	Goals	Apps	Goals	Apps	Goals	Apps	Goals
SC Freiburg II	2023–24	3. Liga	10	2	—		—		—		—		10	2
SC Freiburg II	2024–25	Regionalliga Südwest	10	1	—		—		—		—		10	1
SC Freiburg II	Total		20	3	—		—		—		—		20	3
SC Freiburg	2024–25	Bundesliga	11	2	0	0	—		—		—		11	2
SC Freiburg	2025–26	Bundesliga	27	5	5	0	—		15 (Note: Appearances in UEFA Europa League)	2	—		47	7
SC Freiburg	Total		38	7	5	0	—		15	2	—		58	9
Aston Villa	2026–27	Premier League	8	2	0	0	1	0	2 (Note: Appearances in UEFA Champions League)	1	0	0	11	3
Career total			66	12	5	0	1	0	17	3	0	0	89	15

=== International ===
As of match played 6 October 2026

Appearances and goals by national team and year
National team	Year	Apps	Goals
Switzerland	2025	8	3
Switzerland	2026	12	4
Total		20	7

Scores and results list Switzerland goal tally first, score column indicates score after each Manzambi goal.

List of international goals scored by Johan Manzambi
No.	Date	Venue	Cap	Opponent	Score	Result	Competition
1	10 June 2025	Geodis Park, Nashville, United States	2	United States	4–0	4–0	Friendly
2	10 October 2025	Strawberry Arena, Solna, Sweden	5	Sweden	2–0	2–0	2026 FIFA World Cup qualification
3	15 November 2025	Stade de Genève, Geneva, Switzerland	7	Sweden	4–1	4–1	2026 FIFA World Cup qualification
4	18 June 2026	SoFi Stadium, Inglewood, United States	14	Bosnia and Herzegovina	1–0	4–1	2026 FIFA World Cup
5	18 June 2026	SoFi Stadium, Inglewood, United States	14	Bosnia and Herzegovina	3–0	4–1	2026 FIFA World Cup
6	24 June 2026	BC Place, Vancouver, Canada	15	Canada	2–0	2–1	2026 FIFA World Cup
7	6 October 2026	Thermoplan Arena, Lucerne, Switzerland	20	North Macedonia	2–0	3–0	2026–27 UEFA Nations League

== Honours ==
SC Freiburg

- UEFA Europa League runner-up: 2025–26

Individual

- UEFA Europa League Young Player of the Season: 2025–26
