= 2026 FIFA World Cup qualification – UEFA Group B =

Association football tournament group

The 2026 FIFA World Cup qualification UEFA Group B was one of the twelve UEFA groups in the World Cup qualification tournament to decide which teams would qualify for the 2026 FIFA World Cup final tournament in Canada, Mexico and the United States. Group B consisted of four teams: Kosovo, Slovenia, Sweden and Switzerland. The teams played against each other home-and-away in a round-robin format from September to November 2025.

The group winners, Switzerland, qualified directly for the World Cup finals, while the runners-up, Kosovo, advanced to the second round (play-offs). In addition, Sweden advanced to the play-offs via their Nations League ranking.

== Standings ==
Pos	Team	Pld	W	D	L	GF	GA	GD	Pts	Qualification	(Switzerland)	(Kosovo)	(Slovenia)	(Sweden)
1	Switzerland	6	4	2	0	14	2	+12	14	Qualification for 2026 FIFA World Cup	—	4–0	3–0	4–1
2	Kosovo	6	3	2	1	6	5	+1	11	Advance to play-offs	1–1	—	0–0	2–0
3	Slovenia	6	0	4	2	3	8	−5	4		0–0	0–2	—	2–2
4	Sweden	6	0	2	4	4	12	−8	2	Advance to play-offs via Nations League	0–2	0–1	1–1	—

Source: FIFA, UEFA
Rules for classification: Tiebreakers

== Matches ==
The fixture list was confirmed by UEFA on 13 December 2024 following the draw. Times are CET/CEST, (Note: CEST (UTC+2) for matches until 26 October 2025 (matchdays 1–4), and CET (UTC+1) for matches thereafter (matchdays 5–6).) as listed by UEFA (local times, if different, are in parentheses).

5 September 2025
20:45

Slovenia	2–2	Sweden
Lovrić 46'; Vipotnik 90'	Report (FIFA); Report (UEFA)	Elanga 18'; Ayari 73'

Stožice Stadium, Ljubljana
Attendance: 15,679
Referee: José María Sánchez Martínez (Spain)
5 September 2025
20:45

Switzerland	4–0	Kosovo
Akanji 22'; Embolo 25', 45'; Widmer 39'	Report (FIFA); Report (UEFA)

St. Jakob-Park, Basel
Attendance: 33,996
Referee: Szymon Marciniak (Poland)

8 September 2025
20:45

Kosovo	2–0	Sweden
Rexhbeçaj 26'; Muriqi 42'	Report (FIFA); Report (UEFA)

Fadil Vokrri Stadium, Pristina
Attendance: 12,887
Referee: Allard Lindhout (Netherlands)
8 September 2025
20:45

Switzerland	3–0	Slovenia
Elvedi 18'; Embolo 33'; Ndoye 38'	Report (FIFA); Report (UEFA)

St. Jakob-Park, Basel
Attendance: 12,757
Referee: François Letexier (France)

10 October 2025
20:45

Kosovo	0–0	Slovenia
	Report (FIFA); Report (UEFA)

Fadil Vokrri Stadium, Pristina
Attendance: 12,268
Referee: Marco Guida (Italy)
10 October 2025
20:45

Sweden	0–2	Switzerland
	Report (FIFA); Report (UEFA)	Xhaka 65' (pen.); Manzambi 90+4'

Nationalarenan, Solna
Attendance: 50,151
Referee: Anthony Taylor (England)

13 October 2025
20:45

Slovenia	0–0	Switzerland
	Report (FIFA); Report (UEFA)

Stožice Stadium, Ljubljana
Attendance: 14,637
Referee: Felix Zwayer (Germany)
13 October 2025
20:45

Sweden	0–1	Kosovo
	Report (FIFA); Report (UEFA)	Asllani 32'

Ullevi, Gothenburg
Attendance: 36,571
Referee: Danny Makkelie (Netherlands)

15 November 2025
20:45

Slovenia	0–2	Kosovo
	Report (FIFA); Report (UEFA)	Asllani 6'; Karničnik 64' (o.g.)

Stožice Stadium, Ljubljana
Attendance: 15,382
Referee: Clément Turpin (France)
15 November 2025
20:45

Switzerland	4–1	Sweden
Embolo 12'; Xhaka 60' (pen.); Ndoye 75'; Manzambi 90+4'	Report (FIFA); Report (UEFA)	Nygren 33'

Stade de Genève, Geneva
Attendance: 26,458
Referee: Erik Lambrechts (Belgium)

18 November 2025
20:45

Kosovo	1–1	Switzerland
Muslija 74'	Report (FIFA); Report (UEFA)	Vargas 47'

Fadil Vokrri Stadium, Pristina
Attendance: 11,215
Referee: Davide Massa (Italy)
18 November 2025
20:45

Sweden	1–1	Slovenia
Lundgren 87'	Report (FIFA); Report (UEFA)	Elšnik 64'

Nationalarenan, Solna
Attendance: 25,724
Referee: Maurizio Mariani (Italy)

== Goalscorers ==
There were 27 goals scored in 12 matches, for an average of 2.25 goals per match.

4 goals

- (Switzerland) Breel Embolo

2 goals

- (Kosovo) Fisnik Asllani
- (Switzerland) Johan Manzambi
- (Switzerland) Dan Ndoye
- (Switzerland) Granit Xhaka

1 goal

- (Kosovo) Vedat Muriqi
- (Kosovo) Florent Muslija
- (Kosovo) Elvis Rexhbeçaj
- (Slovenia) Timi Max Elšnik
- (Slovenia) Sandi Lovrić
- (Slovenia) Žan Vipotnik
- (Sweden) Yasin Ayari
- (Sweden) Anthony Elanga
- (Sweden) Gustav Lundgren
- (Sweden) Benjamin Nygren
- (Switzerland) Manuel Akanji
- (Switzerland) Nico Elvedi
- (Switzerland) Rubén Vargas
- (Switzerland) Silvan Widmer

1 own goal

- (Slovenia) Žan Karničnik (against Kosovo)

== Discipline ==
A player or team official was automatically suspended for the next match for the following offences:

- Receiving a red card (red card suspensions could be extended for serious offences)
- Receiving two yellow cards in two different matches (yellow card suspensions were carried forward to the play-offs, but not the finals or any other future international matches)

The following suspensions were served during the qualifying matches:

Team	Player	Offence(s)	Suspended for match(es)
Kosovo	Lindon Emërllahu	(yellow card) (yellow-red card) vs Sweden (8 September 2025)	vs Slovenia (10 October 2025)
Kosovo	Fidan Aliti	(yellow card) vs Sweden (8 September 2025); (yellow card) vs Slovenia (10 October 2025)	vs Sweden (13 October 2025)
Kosovo	Arijanet Muric	(yellow card) vs Sweden (8 September 2025); (yellow card) vs Sweden (13 October 2025)	vs Slovenia (15 November 2025)
Slovenia	Adam Gnezda Čerin	(yellow card) vs Sweden (5 September 2025); (yellow card) vs Switzerland (13 October 2025)	vs Kosovo (15 November 2025)
Slovenia	Petar Stojanović	(yellow card) (yellow-red card) vs Kosovo (15 November 2025)	vs Sweden (18 November 2025)
