= 2016–17 SC Freiburg season =

SC Freiburg
2016–17 season
- Chairman: Fritz Keller
- Manager: Christian Streich
- Stadium: Schwarzwald-Stadion
- Bundesliga: 7th
- DFB-Pokal: Second round
- Top goalscorer: League: Florian Niederlechner (11 goals); All: Florian Niederlechner (12 goals)
- Highest home attendance: 24,000
- Lowest home attendance: 14,600
- Average home league attendance: 23,959
- Biggest win: Babelsberg 0–4 Freiburg
- Biggest defeat: Leipzig 4–0 Freiburg
Home colours	Away colours	Third colours
- All statistics correct as of 27 May 2017.

The 2016–17 SC Freiburg season is the 113th season in the football club's history and 17th overall season in the top flight of German football, the Bundesliga, having won the 2. Bundesliga in the previous season, therefore earning promotion. SC Freiburg will also participate in this season's edition of the domestic cup, the DFB-Pokal. It is the 62nd season for SC Freiburg in the Schwarzwald-Stadion, located in Freiburg im Breisgau, Germany. It covers a period from 1 July 2016 to 30 June 2017.

== Players ==
=== Squad ===
Note: Flags indicate national team as defined under FIFA eligibility rules; some limited exceptions apply. Players may hold more than one non-FIFA nationality.

No.	Pos.	Nation	Player
1	GK	GER	Alexander Schwolow
2	DF	SRB	Aleksandar Ignjovski
3	DF	ESP	Marc Torrejón
4	DF	TUR	Çağlar Söyüncü
5	DF	GER	Manuel Gulde
6	MF	ALB	Amir Abrashi
7	FW	GER	Florian Niederlechner (on loan from Mainz 05)
8	MF	GER	Mike Frantz
11	MF	TUR	Onur Bulut
14	FW	NOR	Håvard Nielsen
15	DF	GER	Pascal Stenzel (on loan from Borussia Dortmund)
17	DF	GER	Lukas Kübler
18	FW	GER	Nils Petersen
19	MF	GER	Janik Haberer

No.	Pos.	Nation	Player
20	DF	GER	Marc-Oliver Kempf
21	GK	GER	Patric Klandt
23	MF	GER	Julian Schuster (Captain)
24	DF	GER	Georg Niedermeier
25	DF	GER	Jonas Föhrenbach
26	MF	GER	Maximilian Philipp
27	MF	GER	Nicolas Höfler
30	DF	GER	Christian Günter
31	MF	SVK	Karim Guédé
32	MF	ITA	Vincenzo Grifo
34	FW	PLE	Amir Falahen
44	GK	POL	Rafał Gikiewicz
--	MF	SUI	Vincent Sierro

=== Transfers ===
==== In ====
No.	Pos.	Nation	Player
—	MF	FRA	Charles-Elie Laprévotte (loan return from Preußen Münster)
—	MF	TUR	Onur Bulut (from VfL Bochum)
—	DF	GER	Manuel Gulde (from Karlsruher SC)
—	DF	TUR	Çağlar Söyüncü (from Altınordu)
—	MF	GER	Jonas Meffert (from Bayer Leverkusen)
—	FW	AUT	Philipp Zulechner (loan return from Young Boys)
—	MF	GER	Sebastian Kerk (loan return from 1. FC Nürnberg)
—	MF	SRB	Aleksandar Ignjovski (from Eintracht Frankfurt)
—	FW	GER	Janik Haberer (from 1899 Hoffenheim, previously on loan at VfL Bochum)

==== Out ====
No.	Pos.	Nation	Player
2	DF	NOR	Vegar Eggen Hedenstad (to FC St. Pauli)
4	DF	GER	Immanuel Höhn (to Darmstadt 98)
9	FW	GER	Tim Kleindienst (on loan to 1. FC Heidenheim)
11	FW	GER	Joshua Mees (loan return to 1899 Hoffenheim)
19	MF	GER	Florian Kath (to 1. FC Magdeburg)
28	MF	GER	Marco Hingerl (to Bayern Munich II)
29	GK	GER	Konstantin Fuhry (to SV Elversberg)
44	MF	GER	Fabian Schleusener (on loan to FSV Frankfurt)
—	DF	SRB	Stefan Mitrović (to Gent, previously on loan)
—	DF	FRA	Christopher Jullien (to Toulouse, previously on loan at Dijon)

== Friendly matches ==
Win Draw Loss

7 July 2016 Friendly	Regio-Auswahl Ottersweier (Germany)	0–4	(Germany) SC Freiburg	Ottersweier, Germany
17:00 CEST (UTC+2)		Report	Niederlechner 25', 44' (pen.); Stanko 41'; Grifo 51'	Stadium: Sportgelände Ottersweier; Attendance: 1,200

10 July 2016 Friendly	SC March (Germany)	1–9	(Germany) SC Freiburg	March, Germany
16:30 CEST (UTC+2)	Groehn 41'	Report	Niederlechner 8'; Bulut 36'; Møller Dæhli 50'; Petersen 52'; Grifo 67'; Schuster 72', 76'; Frantz 80'; Torrejón 90'	Stadium: Waldstadion Neuershausen; Attendance: 2,500

12 July 2016 Friendly	Regio-Auswahl Kippenheim (Germany)	0–2	(Germany) SC Freiburg	Kippenheim, Germany
18:30 CEST (UTC+2)		Report	Grifo 3'; Petersen 53'	Stadium: Sportgelände Kippenheim; Attendance: 2,250

15 July 2016 Friendly	SV Oberschopfheim (Germany)	0–7	(Germany) SC Freiburg	Oberschopfheim, Germany
18:00 CEST (UTC+2)		Report	Niederlechner 16', 23', 45'; Stenzel 36'; Bantle 62' (o.g.); Philipp 81' (pen.); Guédé 89'	Stadium: Sportgelände Oberschopfheim; Attendance: 3,400; Referee: Christine Baitinger

22 July 2016 Friendly	SV Zimmern (Germany)	0–9	(Germany) SC Freiburg	Zimmern ob Rottweil, Germany
17:00 CEST (UTC+2)		Report	Niederlechner 12', 27', 41', 42'; Møller Dæhli 35'; Philipp 52'; Gulde 53'; Grifo 63'; Guédé 78'	Stadium: Sportgelände Zimmern
Note: The match paused in the 20th minute due to a thunderstorm, but resumed shortly after.

27 July 2016 Friendly	SC Freiburg (Germany)	2–1	(Turkey) Çaykur Rizespor	Schruns, Austria
18:00 CEST (UTC+2)	Kempf 21'; Niederlechner 90+7'	Report	Rezaeian 82'	Stadium: Stadion Schruns

30 July 2016 Friendly	SC Freiburg (Germany)	0–0	(Germany) 1860 Munich	Ravensburg, Germany
16:30 CEST (UTC+2)		Report		Stadium: EBRA Stadion; Attendance: 2,000; Referee: Robert Kempter

14 August 2016 Friendly	SC Freiburg (Germany)	0–2	(Italy) Milan	Freiburg im Breisgau, Germany
16:30 CEST (UTC+2)		Report	Luiz Adriano 39', 45'	Stadium: Schwarzwald-Stadion; Attendance: 24,000; Referee: Matthias Jöllenbeck

=== Kaiserstuhl-Cup ===
Pos	Team	Pld	W	L	GF	GA	GD	Pts	Final result
1	(Germany) SC Freiburg	2	2	0	5	2	+3	6	2016 Kaiserstuhl-Cup Champions
2	(Germany) SV Endingen	1	1	0	4	2	+2	3	
3	(Germany) Bahlinger SC (H)	2	1	1	5	4	+1	3	
4	(Germany) Darmstadt 98	1	0	1	1	3	−2	0	
5	(Germany) Offenburger FV	2	0	2	4	8	−4	0	

Source: Bahlinger SC
Rules for classification: 1) Points; 2) Goal difference; 3) Head to head result
(H) Hosts

6 August 2016 1	SC Freiburg (Germany)	3–1	(Germany) Darmstadt 98	Bahlingen, Germany
16:00 CEST (UTC+2)	Niederlechner 22', 40' (pen.), 75'	Report	Vrančić 28'	Stadium: Kaiserstuhlstadion; Attendance: 3,420

7 August 2016 2	Bahlinger SC (Germany)	1–2	(Germany) SC Freiburg	Bahlingen, Germany
17:00 CEST (UTC+2)	Häringer 43'	Report	Schuster 8'; Møller Dæhli 24'	Stadium: Kaiserstuhlstadion; Attendance: 1,710

== Competitions ==
Win Draw Loss

=== Overview ===
Competition	First match	Last match	Starting round	Final position	Record							
Competition	First match	Last match	Starting round	Final position	Pld	W	D	L	GF	GA	GD	Win %
Bundesliga	28 August 2016	20 May 2017	Matchday 1	7th	34	14	6	14	42	60	−18	41.18
DFB-Pokal	20 August 2016	25 October 2016	First round	Second round	2	1	1	0	7	3	+4	50.00
Total					36	15	7	14	49	63	−14	41.67

Last updated: 27 May 2017
Source: Competitions

=== Bundesliga ===
==== League table ====
Pos	Team	Pld	W	D	L	GF	GA	GD	Pts	Qualification or relegation
5	1. FC Köln	34	12	13	9	51	42	+9	49	Qualification for the Europa League group stage (Note: Since the winners of the 2016–17 DFB-Pokal, Borussia Dortmund, qualified for the Champions League based on league position, the Europa League group stage spot was passed to the sixth-placed team, Hertha BSC; and the Europa League third qualifying round spot was passed to the seventh-placed team, SC Freiburg.)
6	Hertha BSC	34	15	4	15	43	47	−4	49	Qualification for the Europa League group stage
7	SC Freiburg	34	14	6	14	42	60	−18	48	Qualification for the Europa League third qualifying round
8	Werder Bremen	34	13	6	15	61	64	−3	45	
9	Borussia Mönchengladbach	34	12	9	13	45	49	−4	45	

Source: DFB
Rules for classification: 1) Points; 2) Goal difference; 3) Goals scored; 4) Head-to-head points; 5) Head-to-head goal difference; 6) Head-to-head away goals scored; 7) Away goals scored; 8) Play-off.

==== Results summary ====
Overall								Home						Away					
Pld	W	D	L	GF	GA	GD	Pts	W	D	L	GF	GA	GD	W	D	L	GF	GA	GD
34	14	6	14	42	60	−18	48	10	2	5	23	24	−1	4	4	9	19	36	−17

Last updated: 27 May 2017.
Source: Bundesliga

==== Results by round ====
Round	1	2	3	4	5	6	7	8	9	10	11	12	13	14	15	16	17	18	19	20	21	22	23	24	25	26	27	28	29	30	31	32	33	34
Ground	A	H	A	H	A	H	A	H	A	H	A	H	A	H	A	A	H	H	A	H	A	H	A	H	A	H	A	H	A	H	A	H	H	A
Result	L	W	L	W	L	W	L	W	W	L	L	L	D	W	D	W	L	W	L	W	D	L	W	D	D	L	W	W	L	W	L	W	D	L
Position	12	6	12	9	12	10	11	8	8	9	10	11	11	9	10	8	9	8	8	8	9	9	8	8	8	8	7	6	6	6	7	5	6	7

Updated to match(es) played on 27 May 2017. Source: Bundesliga
A = Away; H = Home; W = Win; D = Draw; L = Loss

==== Matches ====
28 August 2016 1	Hertha BSC	2–1	SC Freiburg	Berlin
15:30 CEST (UTC+2)	Darida 62'; Schieber 90+5'	Report	Gulde (yellow card) 34'; Niederlechner (yellow card) 83'; Höfler 90+3', (yellow card) 90+7'	Stadium: Olympiastadion Berlin; Attendance: 41,648; Referee: Benjamin Brand

10 September 2016 2	SC Freiburg	3–1	Borussia Mönchengladbach	Freiburg im Breisgau
15:30 CEST (UTC+2)	Philipp 54', 85', (yellow card) 86'; Haberer (yellow card) 76'; Petersen 88' (pen.)	Report	Hazard 35'; Raffael (yellow card) 51'; Sommer (yellow card) 87'	Stadium: Schwarzwald-Stadion; Attendance: 24,000; Referee: Harm Osmers

16 September 2016 3	1. FC Köln	3–0	SC Freiburg	Cologne
20:30 CEST (UTC+2)	Modeste 29', 43'; Bittencourt 31'; Risse (yellow card) 83'	Report	Höfler (yellow card) 39'	Stadium: RheinEnergieSTADION; Attendance: 47,200; Referee: Felix Zwayer

20 September 2016 4	SC Freiburg	1–0	Hamburger SV	Freiburg im Breisgau
20:00 CEST (UTC+2)	Frantz (yellow card) 33'; Petersen 70'	Report		Stadium: Schwarzwald-Stadion; Attendance: 24,000; Referee: Markus Schmidt

23 September 2016 5	Borussia Dortmund	3–1	SC Freiburg	Dortmund
20:30 CEST (UTC+2)	Dembélé (yellow card) 38'; Aubameyang 45'; Piszczek 53'; Papastathopoulos (yellow card) 70'; Guerreiro 90+1'	Report	Philipp 60'; Günter (yellow card) 62'; Höfler (yellow card) 65'; Söyüncü (yellow card) 76'	Stadium: SIGNAL IDUNA PARK; Attendance: 80,800; Referee: Christian Dingert

1 October 2016 6	SC Freiburg	1–0	Eintracht Frankfurt	Freiburg im Breisgau
15:30 CEST (UTC+2)	Grifo 4'; Niederlechner (yellow card) 46'; Bulut (yellow card) 61'; Abrashi (yellow card) 67'; Philipp (yellow card) 84'	Report	Vallejo (yellow card) 4'; Fabián (yellow card) 45+1'; Mascarell (yellow card) 67'	Stadium: Schwarzwald-Stadion; Attendance: 24,000; Referee: Marco Fritz

15 October 2016 7	1899 Hoffenheim	2–1	SC Freiburg	Sinsheim
15:30 CEST (UTC+2)	Wagner 34'; Vogt (yellow card) 54'; Rudy (yellow card) 70'; Kramarić 81' (pen.)	Report	Torrejón (yellow card) 65'; Niederlechner 77'; Haberer (yellow card) 90+3'; Söyüncü (yellow card) 90+4'	Stadium: WIRSOL Rhein-Neckar-Arena; Attendance: 28,540; Referee: Deniz Aytekin

22 October 2016 8	SC Freiburg	2–1	FC Augsburg	Freiburg im Breisgau
15:30 CEST (UTC+2)	Bulut (yellow card) 54'; Philipp 66'; Petersen 78'	Report	Altıntop 84'	Stadium: Schwarzwald-Stadion; Attendance: 24,000; Referee: Manuel Gräfe

29 October 2016 9	Werder Bremen	1–3	SC Freiburg	Bremen
15:30 CEST (UTC+2)	S. García (yellow card) 9', (goal) 67'	Report	Frantz (yellow card) 24'; Philipp 29', (yellow card) 68'; Grifo 39' (pen.); Abrashi 75'; Höfler (yellow card) 83'	Stadium: Weser-Stadion; Attendance: 41,500; Referee: Guido Winkmann

5 November 2016 10	SC Freiburg	0–3	VfL Wolfsburg	Freiburg im Breisgau
15:30 CET (UTC+1)	Abrashi (yellow card) 24'; Günter (yellow card) 42' (red card) 85'; Söyüncü (yellow card) 65'	Report	Gómez 41', 53', (yellow card) 80'; Arnold (yellow card) 73'; Rodríguez 86' (pen.)	Stadium: Schwarzwald-Stadion; Attendance: 23,500; Referee: Felix Brych

19 November 2016 11	Mainz 05	4–2	SC Freiburg	Mainz
15:30 CET (UTC+1)	Bungert 15'; Mallı 20' (pen.); Bell (yellow card) 37', (goal) 82'; Frei (yellow card) 57'; Onisiwo (yellow card) 65', (goal) 90+5'; Brosinski (yellow card) 88'	Report	Niederlechner (yellow card) 1'; Söyüncü (yellow card) 19'; Grifo 67', (yellow card) 88'; Petersen 85'	Stadium: OPEL ARENA; Attendance: 26,573; Referee: Patrick Ittrich

25 November 2016 12	SC Freiburg	1–4	RB Leipzig	Freiburg im Breisgau
20:30 CET (UTC+1)	Niederlechner 15'; Stenzel (yellow card) 18'; Höfler (yellow card) 63'	Report	Keïta 2'; Werner 21', 35'; Orban (yellow card) 32'; Schmitz (yellow card) 42'; Poulsen (yellow card) 49'; Sabitzer 79'	Stadium: Schwarzwald-Stadion; Attendance: 24,000; Referee: Benjamin Brand

3 December 2016 13	Bayer Leverkusen	1–1	SC Freiburg	Leverkusen
15:30 CET (UTC+1)	Çalhanoğlu 60'	Report	Haberer 30'; Schuster (yellow card) 41'	Stadium: BayArena; Attendance: 27,111; Referee: Benjamin Cortus

10 December 2016 14	SC Freiburg	1–0	Darmstadt 98	Freiburg im Breisgau
15:30 CET (UTC+1)	Schuster (yellow card) 10'; Stenzel (yellow card) 38'; Höfler (yellow card) 61'; Petersen 86' (pen.)	Report	Vrančić (yellow card) 23'; Schipplock (yellow card) 42'; Gondorf (yellow card) 84'; Esser (yellow card) 85'	Stadium: Schwarzwald-Stadion; Attendance: 24,000; Referee: Wolfgang Stark

17 December 2016 15	Schalke 04	1–1	SC Freiburg	Gelsenkirchen
15:30 CET (UTC+1)	Geis (yellow card) 42'; Konoplyanka 74'	Report	Niederlechner 64'	Stadium: VELTINS-Arena; Attendance: 60,445; Referee: Manuel Gräfe

21 December 2016 16	FC Ingolstadt	1–2	SC Freiburg	Ingolstadt
20:00 CET (UTC+1)	Morales (yellow card) 20'; Roger (yellow card) 42'; Suttner 53'; Tisserand (yellow card) 67'; Matip (yellow card) 85'	Report	Niederlechner 34' (pen.), 41'; Stenzel (yellow card) 88'; Bulut (yellow card) 89'	Stadium: Audi Sportpark; Attendance: 13,904; Referee: Sascha Stegemann

20 January 2017 17	SC Freiburg	1–2	Bayern Munich	Freiburg im Breisgau
20:30 CET (UTC+1)	Haberer 4', (yellow card) 74'; Schwolow (yellow card) 84'	Report	Alonso (yellow card) 31'; Lewandowski 35', 90+1'; Douglas Costa (yellow card) 48'	Stadium: Schwarzwald-Stadion; Attendance: 24,000; Referee: Manuel Gräfe

29 January 2017 18	SC Freiburg	2–1	Hertha BSC	Freiburg im Breisgau
15:30 CET (UTC+1)	Haberer 39'; Petersen 87'	Report	Stark (yellow card) 10'; Kalou (yellow card) 34'; Schieber 88'	Stadium: Schwarzwald-Stadion; Attendance: 23,800; Referee: Günter Perl

4 February 2017 19	Borussia Mönchengladbach	3–0	SC Freiburg	Mönchengladbach
15:30 CET (UTC+1)	Stindl (yellow card) 56', (goal) 73'; Raffael 78'; Herrmann 90+2'	Report	Günter (yellow card) 56'	Stadium: BORUSSIA-PARK; Attendance: 47,194; Referee: Felix Brych

12 February 2017 20	SC Freiburg	2–1	1. FC Köln	Freiburg im Breisgau
17:30 CET (UTC+1)	Grifo 32'; Haberer (yellow card) 53'; Philipp 77'	Report	Modeste 39'; Hector (yellow card) 84'	Stadium: Schwarzwald-Stadion; Attendance: 24,000; Referee: Robert Hartmann

18 February 2017 21	Hamburger SV	2–2	SC Freiburg	Hamburg
18:30 CET (UTC+1)	Hunt 15', (yellow card) 68'; Gregoritsch 57'; Kostić (yellow card) 62'; Djourou (yellow card) 74'	Report	Philipp 23', (yellow card) 36'; Haberer (yellow card) 56'; Grifo 72'	Stadium: Volksparkstadion; Attendance: 49,405; Referee: Christian Dingert

25 February 2017 22	SC Freiburg	0–3	Borussia Dortmund	Freiburg im Breisgau
15:30 CET (UTC+1)	Philipp (yellow card) 67'	Report	Papastathopoulos 13'; Aubameyang 55', 70'	Stadium: Schwarzwald-Stadion; Attendance: 24,000; Referee: Daniel Siebert

5 March 2017 23	Eintracht Frankfurt	1–2	SC Freiburg	Frankfurt
15:30 CET (UTC+1)	Hrgota 11'; Gaćinović (yellow card) 37'; Oczipka (yellow card) 75'	Report	Niederlechner 25', 59'; Günter (yellow card) 38'	Stadium: Commerzbank-Arena; Attendance: 51,500; Referee: Günter Perl

11 March 2017 24	SC Freiburg	1–1	1899 Hoffenheim	Freiburg im Breisgau
15:30 CET (UTC+1)	Höfler (yellow card) 5'; Philipp 56'; Haberer (yellow card) 61'	Report	Vogt (yellow card) 56'; Kramarić 60'; Hübner (yellow card) 62'	Stadium: Schwarzwald-Stadion; Attendance: 24,000; Referee: Wolfgang Stark

18 March 2017 25	FC Augsburg	1–1	SC Freiburg	Augsburg
15:30 CET (UTC+1)	Hitz (yellow card) 29'; Stafylidis 38'; Koo (yellow card) 41'	Report	Niederlechner 30' (pen.); Günter (yellow card) 33'; Ignjovski (yellow card) 90'	Stadium: WWK ARENA; Attendance: 28,843; Referee: Sascha Stegemann

1 April 2017 26	SC Freiburg	2–5	Werder Bremen	Freiburg im Breisgau
15:30 CEST (UTC+2)	Kempf (yellow card) 27'; Petersen 64'; Grifo 77'; Schuster (yellow card) 81'	Report	Kruse 21'; Delaney 45+2', 47', 85'; Bartels 71'; Caldirola (yellow card) 81'	Stadium: Schwarzwald-Stadion; Attendance: 24,000; Referee: Wolfgang Stark

5 April 2017 27	VfL Wolfsburg	0–1	SC Freiburg	Wolfsburg
20:00 CEST (UTC+2)		Report	Niederlechner (yellow card) 72', (goal) 78'	Stadium: VOLKSWAGEN ARENA; Attendance: 24,179; Referee: Guido Winkmann

8 April 2017 28	SC Freiburg	1–0	Mainz 05	Freiburg im Breisgau
15:30 CEST (UTC+2)	Petersen 70'	Report	Bell (yellow card) 39'; Ramalho (yellow card) 59'; Latza (yellow card) 89'	Stadium: Schwarzwald-Stadion; Attendance: 24,000; Referee: Harm Osmers

15 April 2017 29	RB Leipzig	4–0	SC Freiburg	Leipzig
15:30 CEST (UTC+2)	Keïta (yellow card) 27', (goal) 51'; Poulsen 36'; Werner 42'; Demme 90'	Report	Haberer (yellow card) 68'; Kübler (yellow card) 75'	Stadium: Red Bull Arena; Attendance: 41,446; Referee: Manuel Gräfe

23 April 2017 30	SC Freiburg	2–1	Bayer Leverkusen	Freiburg im Breisgau
15:30 CEST (UTC+2)	Petersen 11'; Kempf (yellow card) 39'; Stenzel 88'; Ignjovski (yellow card) 90'	Report	Hilbert (yellow card) 55'; Volland 60' (pen.); Bailey (yellow card) 90'	Stadium: Schwarzwald-Stadion; Attendance: 24,000; Referee: Felix Brych

29 April 2017 31	Darmstadt 98	3–0	SC Freiburg	Darmstadt
15:30 CEST (UTC+2)	Platte 22'; Gondorf (yellow card) 25', (goal) 45'; Banggaard (yellow card) 42'; Schipplock 65'	Report		Stadium: Jonathan-Heimes-Stadion am Böllenfalltor; Attendance: 17,400; Referee: Benjamin Cortus

7 May 2017 32	SC Freiburg	2–0	Schalke 04	Freiburg im Breisgau
17:30 CEST (UTC+2)	Niederlechner 22', 31' (pen.)	Report	Höwedes (yellow card) 46'; Avdijaj (yellow card) 63'	Stadium: Schwarzwald-Stadion; Attendance: 24,000; Referee: Robert Kampka

13 May 2017 33	SC Freiburg	1–1	FC Ingolstadt	Freiburg im Breisgau
15:30 CEST (UTC+2)	Philipp 31'; Gulde (yellow card) 71'; Abrashi (yellow card) 90+2'	Report	Lezcano 43', (yellow card) 69'; Hadergjonaj (yellow card) 45'; Roger (yellow card) 61'	Stadium: Schwarzwald-Stadion; Attendance: 24,000; Referee: Bastian Dankert

20 May 2017 34	Bayern Munich	4–1	SC Freiburg	Munich
15:30 CEST (UTC+2)	Robben 4'; Vidal (yellow card) 53', (goal) 73'; Ribéry 90+1'; Kimmich 90+4'	Report	Petersen 76'	Stadium: Allianz Arena; Attendance: 75,000; Referee: Jochen Drees

=== DFB-Pokal ===
20 August 2016 First round	SV Babelsberg	0–4	SC Freiburg	Potsdam
15:30 CEST (UTC+2)	Akdarı (yellow card) 14'; Otremba (yellow card) 19'; Saalbach (yellow card) 29'; Çepni (yellow card) 36'; Steinborn (yellow card) 65'	Report	Grifo 20' (pen.), 63'; Ignjovski (yellow card) 33'; Haberer 40'; Niederlechner 69'	Stadium: Karl-Liebknecht-Stadion; Attendance: 6,341; Referee: René Rohde

25 October 2016 Second round	SC Freiburg	3–3 (a.e.t.) (3–4 p)	SV Sandhausen	Freiburg im Breisgau
18:30 CEST (UTC+2)	Møller Dæhli 21'; Philipp (yellow card) 36'; Grifo 76'; Haberer (yellow card) 78'; Petersen 82' (pen.); Gulde (yellow card) 90+2'	Report	Kister 39', (yellow card) 82'; Wooten 53', (yellow card) 72'; Sukuta-Pasu 64'; Kulovits (yellow card) 97'	Stadium: Schwarzwald-Stadion; Attendance: 14,600; Referee: Tobias Stieler
	Penalties
	Petersen (penalty missed); Günter (penalty scored); Torrejón (penalty missed); Grifo (penalty scored); Philipp (penalty scored); Haberer (penalty missed)		(penalty missed) Roßbach; (penalty scored) Sukuta-Pasu; (penalty scored) Kister; (penalty missed) Pledl; (penalty scored) Karl; (penalty scored) Vunguidica

== Statistics ==
=== Appearances and goals ===
No.	Pos	Nat	Player	Total		Bundesliga		DFB-Pokal	
No.	Pos	Nat	Player	Apps	Goals	Apps	Goals	Apps	Goals
Goalkeepers
1	GK	(Germany) GER	Alexander Schwolow	35	0	34	0	1	0
21	GK	(Germany) GER	Patric Klandt	0	0	0	0	0	0
44	GK	(Poland) POL	Rafal Gikiewicz	1	0	0	0	1	0
Defenders
2	DF	(Serbia) SRB	Aleksandar Ignjovski	21	0	12+7	0	2	0
3	DF	(Spain) ESP	Marc Torrejón	13	0	10+2	0	0+1	0
4	DF	(Turkey) TUR	Çağlar Söyüncü	25	0	24	0	1	0
5	DF	(Germany) GER	Manuel Gulde	21	0	19+1	0	1	0
15	DF	(Germany) GER	Pascal Stenzel	19	1	14+5	1	0	0
17	DF	(Germany) GER	Lukas Kübler	16	0	14+2	0	0	0
20	DF	(Germany) GER	Marc-Oliver Kempf	13	0	12+1	0	0	0
24	DF	(Germany) GER	Georg Niedermeier	7	0	0+6	0	1	0
25	DF	(Germany) GER	Jonas Föhrenbach	3	0	1+2	0	0	0
30	DF	(Germany) GER	Christian Günter	33	0	30+1	0	2	0
Midfielders
6	MF	(Albania) ALB	Amir Abrashi	21	1	16+4	1	1	0
8	MF	(Germany) GER	Mike Frantz	30	0	29+1	0	0	0
11	MF	(Turkey) TUR	Onur Bulut	23	0	12+9	0	1+1	0
19	MF	(Germany) GER	Janik Haberer	34	4	22+10	3	2	1
22	MF	(Switzerland) SUI	Vincent Sierro	0	0	0	0	0	0
23	MF	(Germany) GER	Julian Schuster	14	0	9+4	0	0+1	0
26	MF	(Germany) GER	Maximilian Philipp	27	9	23+2	9	1+1	0
27	MF	(Germany) GER	Nicolas Höfler	29	1	26+2	1	1	0
31	MF	(Slovakia) SVK	Karim Guédé	5	0	3+2	0	0	0
32	MF	(Italy) ITA	Vincenzo Grifo	32	9	27+3	6	1+1	3
Forwards
7	FW	(Germany) GER	Florian Niederlechner	36	12	29+5	11	2	1
14	FW	(Norway) NOR	Håvard Nielsen	4	0	0+4	0	0	0
18	FW	(Germany) GER	Nils Petersen	34	11	7+26	10	1	1
34	FW	(Palestine) PLE	Amir Falahen	0	0	0	0	0	0
Players transferred out during the season
16	MF	(Norway) NOR	Mats Møller Dæhli	4	1	0+2	0	1+1	1
22	MF	(Germany) GER	Jonas Meffert	3	0	1	0	2	0
29	MF	(France) FRA	Charles-Elie Laprévotte	0	0	0	0	0	0
35	MF	(Georgia (country)) GEO	Lucas Hufnagel	0	0	0	0	0	0

Last updated: 20 May 2017
Source: Competitions

=== Goalscorers ===
Rank	No.	Pos	Nat	Name	Bundesliga	DFB-Pokal	Total
1	7	FW	(Germany)	Florian Niederlechner	11	1	12
2	18	FW	(Germany)	Nils Petersen	10	1	11
3	26	MF	(Germany)	Maximilian Philipp	9	0	9
3	32	MF	(Italy)	Vincenzo Grifo	6	3	9
5	19	MF	(Germany)	Janik Haberer	3	1	4
6	6	MF	(Albania)	Amir Abrashi	1	0	1
6	15	DF	(Germany)	Pascal Stenzel	1	0	1
6	16	MF	(Norway)	Mats Møller Dæhli	0	1	1
6	27	MF	(Germany)	Nicolas Höfler	1	0	1
Own goal					0	0	0
Totals					42	7	49

Last updated: 20 May 2017

=== Clean sheets ===
Rank	No.	Pos	Nat	Name	Bundesliga	DFB-Pokal	Total
1	1	GK	(Germany)	Alexander Schwolow	6	1	7
Totals					6	1	7

Last updated: 7 May 2017

=== Disciplinary record ===
No.	Pos	Nat	Player	Bundesliga			DFB-Pokal			Total		
No.	Pos	Nat	Player	Yellow card	(yellow card) (yellow-red card)	Red card	Yellow card	(yellow card) (yellow-red card)	Red card	Yellow card	(yellow card) (yellow-red card)	Red card
1	GK	(Germany)	Alexander Schwolow	1	0	0	0	0	0	1	0	0
2	DF	(Serbia)	Aleksandar Ignjovski	2	0	0	1	0	0	3	0	0
3	DF	(Spain)	Marc Torrejón	1	0	0	0	0	0	1	0	0
4	DF	(Turkey)	Çağlar Söyüncü	4	0	0	0	0	0	4	0	0
5	DF	(Germany)	Manuel Gulde	2	0	0	1	0	0	3	0	0
6	MF	(Albania)	Amir Abrashi	3	0	0	0	0	0	3	0	0
7	FW	(Germany)	Florian Niederlechner	4	0	0	0	0	0	4	0	0
8	MF	(Germany)	Mike Frantz	2	0	0	0	0	0	2	0	0
11	MF	(Turkey)	Onur Bulut	3	0	0	0	0	0	3	0	0
15	DF	(Germany)	Pascal Stenzel	3	0	0	0	0	0	3	0	0
17	DF	(Germany)	Lukas Kübler	1	0	0	0	0	0	1	0	0
19	MF	(Germany)	Janik Haberer	7	0	0	1	0	0	8	0	0
20	DF	(Germany)	Marc-Oliver Kempf	2	0	0	0	0	0	2	0	0
23	MF	(Germany)	Julian Schuster	3	0	0	0	0	0	3	0	0
26	MF	(Germany)	Maximilian Philipp	5	0	0	1	0	0	6	0	0
27	MF	(Germany)	Nicolas Höfler	6	0	0	0	0	0	6	0	0
30	DF	(Germany)	Christian Günter	5	0	1	0	0	0	5	0	1
32	MF	(Italy)	Vincenzo Grifo	1	0	0	0	0	0	1	0	0
Totals				55	0	1	4	0	0	59	0	1

Last updated: 13 May 2017
