= Sarmaturbo superbus =

Scientific classification
- Kingdom: Animalia
- Phylum: Mollusca
- Class: Gastropoda
- Subclass: Vetigastropoda
- Order: Trochida
- Superfamily: Trochoidea
- Family: Turbinidae
- Genus: †Sarmaturbo
- Species: †S. superbus

Binomial name
- †Sarmaturbo superbus (Zittel, 1865)

Synonyms
- Turbo superbus Zittel, 1865

Extinct species of gastropod

Sarmaturbo superbus is an extinct species of sea snail, a marine gastropod mollusk, in the family Turbinidae, the turban snails.

== Distribution ==
This species occurs in New Zealand.
