= 2016 Kaiserstuhl-Cup =

Tournament details
- Host country: Germany
- Dates: 6–7 August 2016
- Teams: 4 (from 1 confederation)
- Venue: 1 (in 1 host city)

Final positions
- Champions: SC Freiburg

Tournament statistics
- Matches played: 4
- Goals scored: 19 (4.75 per match)
- Top scorer(s): (Germany) Florian Niederlechner (3 goals)

The 2016 Kaiserstuhl-Cup (known as the AXA Kaiserstuhl-Cup for sponsorship reasons) was the 32nd edition of the summer football friendly tournament, organised by German club Bahlinger SC. It was hosted at the Kaiserstuhlstadion in Bahlingen, from 6 to 7 August 2016. Besides the hosts, four other German teams took part: SC Freiburg, Darmstadt 98, Offenburger FV, and SV Endingen. SC Freiburg won the Kaiserstuhl-Cup after winning both of their matches.

== Overview ==
=== Participants ===
Nation	Team	Location	League
Germany	SC Freiburg	Freiburg im Breisgau	Bundesliga
Germany	Darmstadt 98	Darmstadt	Bundesliga
Germany	Offenburger FV	Offenburg	Oberliga Baden-Württemberg
Germany	Bahlinger SC	Bahlingen	Oberliga Baden-Württemberg
Germany	SV Endingen	Endingen am Kaiserstuhl	Verbandsliga Südbaden

=== Standings ===
Freiburg, Bahlingen, and Offenburg played two matches, while Darmstadt and Endingen played one.

Pos	Team	Pld	W	L	GF	GA	GD	Pts	Final result
1	(Germany) SC Freiburg	2	2	0	5	2	+3	6	2016 Kaiserstuhl-Cup Champions
2	(Germany) SV Endingen	1	1	0	4	2	+2	3	
3	(Germany) Bahlinger SC (H)	2	1	1	5	4	+1	3	
4	(Germany) Darmstadt 98	1	0	1	1	3	−2	0	
5	(Germany) Offenburger FV	2	0	2	4	8	−4	0	

Source: Bahlinger SC
Rules for classification: 1) Points; 2) Goal difference; 3) Head to head result
(H) Hosts

=== Matches ===
6 August 2016
16:00 CEST

SC Freiburg (Germany)	3–1	(Germany) Darmstadt 98
Niederlechner 22', 40' (pen.), 75'	Report	Vrančić 28'

Kaiserstuhlstadion, Bahlingen
Attendance: 3,420

6 August 2016
18:00 CEST

Bahlinger SC (Germany)	4–2	(Germany) Offenburger FV
Bührer 11' (pen.), 16'; Keller 60'; Metzinger 75'	Report	Feger 38'; Schillinger 80'

Kaiserstuhlstadion, Bahlingen

7 August 2016
15:00 CEST

SV Endingen (Germany)	4–2	(Germany) Offenburger FV
Fischer 14', 35'; Sommer 21'; Futterer 55'	Report	Schätzle 60'; Petereit 78'

Kaiserstuhlstadion, Bahlingen

7 August 2016
17:00 CEST

Bahlinger SC (Germany)	1–2	(Germany) SC Freiburg
Häringer 43'	Report	Schuster 8'; Møller Dæhli 24'

Kaiserstuhlstadion, Bahlingen
Attendance: 1,710
