= Sarmaturbo =

Scientific classification
- Kingdom: Animalia
- Phylum: Mollusca
- Class: Gastropoda
- Subclass: Vetigastropoda
- Order: Trochida
- Superfamily: Trochoidea
- Family: Turbinidae
- Genus: †Sarmaturbo; Powell, 1938

Extinct genus of gastropods

Sarmaturbo is an extinct genus of sea snails, marine gastropod mollusks, in the family Turbinidae, the turban snails.

== Species ==
Species within the genus Sarmaturbo include:

- † Sarmaturbo colini (L. C. King, 1931)
- † Sarmaturbo superbus (Zittel, 1865)
