= Karl Alfred von Zittel =

German palaeontologist (1839–1904)

Karl Alfred Ritter von Zittel
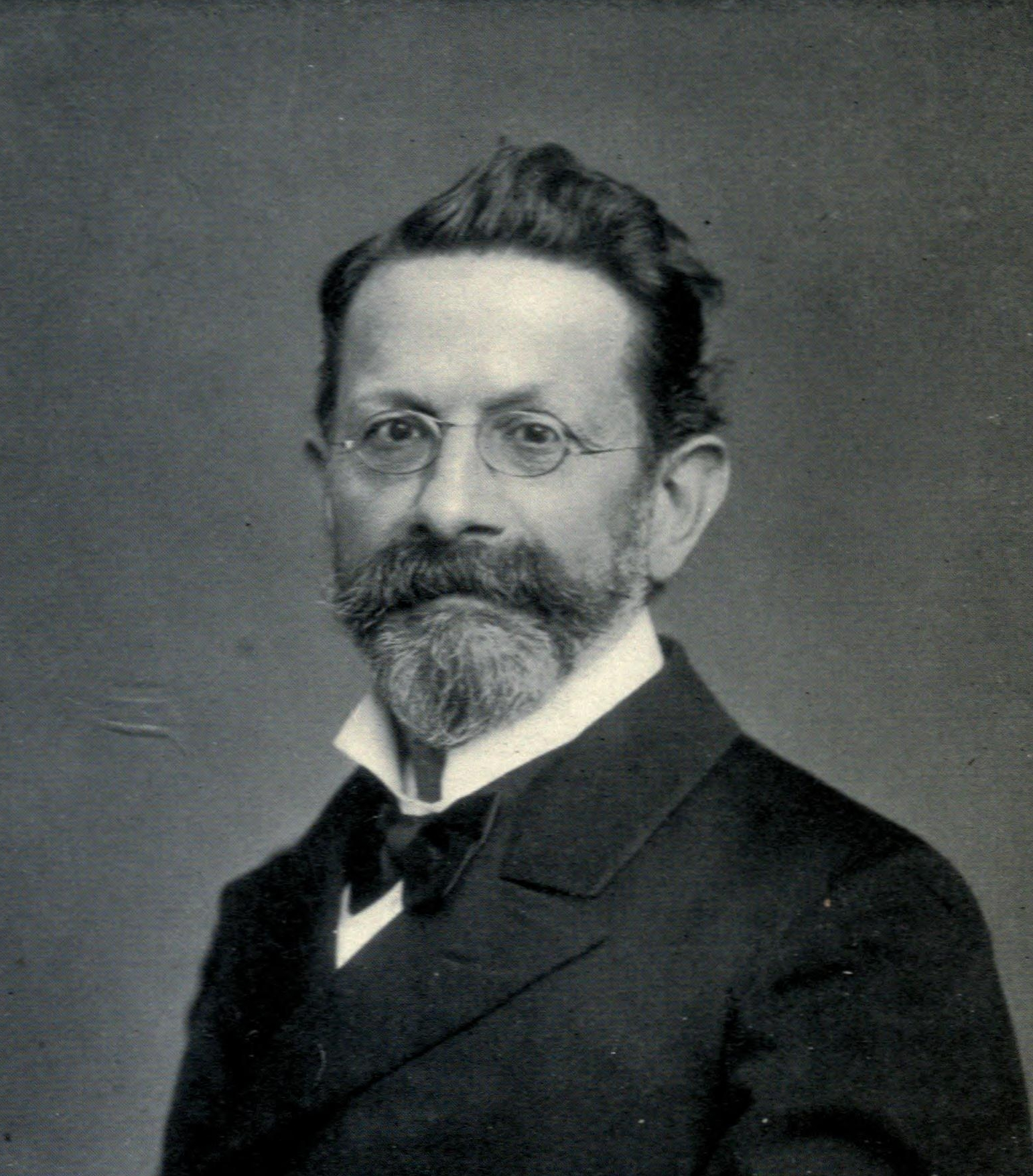
- Zittel around 1890
- Born: 25 September 1839; Bahlingen
- Died: 5 January 1904 (aged 64); Munich
- Scientific career
- Fields: Paleontology

Karl Alfred Ritter von Zittel (25 September 1839 – 5 January 1904) was a German palaeontologist best known for his Handbuch der Palaeontologie (1876–1893).

== Biography ==
Karl Alfred von Zittel was born in Bahlingen in the Grand Duchy of Baden. His father, Karl was a leading liberal cleric in Baden. He was educated at Heidelberg University, the University of Paris and the University of Vienna. For a short period, he served on the Geological Survey of Austria, and as assistant in the mineralogical museum at Vienna. In 1863, he became teacher of geology and mineralogy at the Polytechnical School Karlsruhe, and three years later he succeeded Albert Oppel as professor of palaeontology at the Ludwig-Maximilians-Universität München (LMU), with the charge of the state collection of fossils.

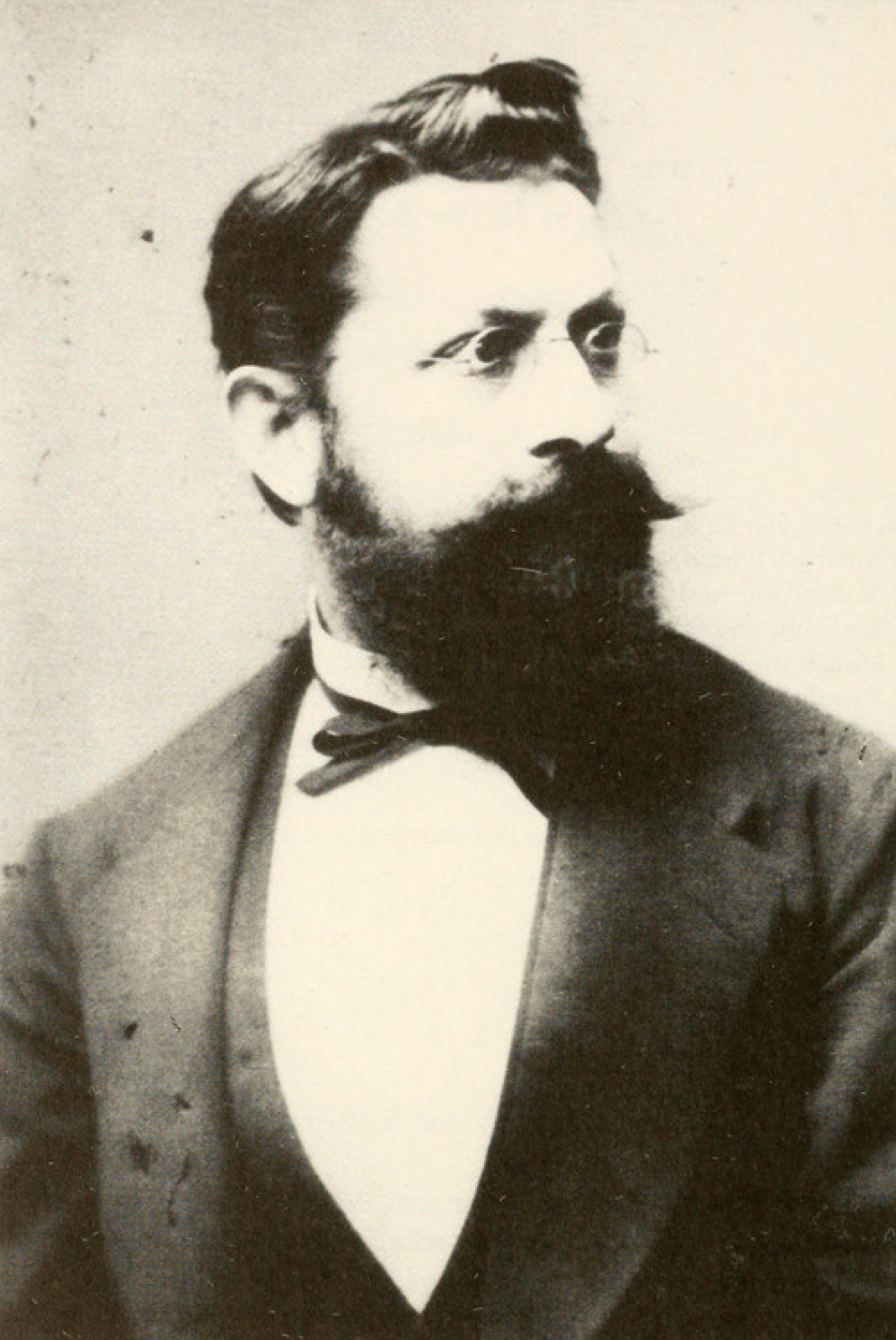
Karl Alfred von Zittel, c. 1870

In 1873–1874, he accompanied the Friedrich Gerhard Rohlfs's expedition to the Libyan Desert, the primary results of which were published in Über den geologischen Bau der libyschen Wuste (1880), and further details in the Palaeontographica (1883). Zittel was distinguished for his palaeontological researches. From 1869 until the close of his life he was the chief editor of the Palaeontographica.

In 1876, he commenced the publication of his great work, Handbuch der Palaeontologie, which was completed in 1893 in five volumes, the fifth volume on palaeobotany being prepared by W. P. Schimper and A. Schenk. To make his work as trustworthy as possible Zittel made special studies of each great group, commencing with the fossil sponges, on which he published a monograph (1877–1879). In 1895, he issued a summary of his larger work entitled Grundzüge der Palaeontologie.

In 1880, Zittel was appointed to the geological professorship, and eventually to the directorship of the natural history museum of Munich. His earlier work comprised a monograph on the Cretaceous bivalve mollusca of Gosau (1863–1866); and an essay on the Tithonian stage (1870), regarded as equivalent to the Purbeck Group and Wealden formations.

== Publications and honours ==
Zittel published Aus der Urzeit and Die Sahara (1883). In 1899, he published Geschichte der Geologie und Palaeontologie bis Ende des 19 Jahrhunderts, a monumental history of the progress of geological science. Zittel was president of the Royal Bavarian Academy of Sciences from 1899, and in 1894 he was awarded the Wollaston medal by the Geological Society of London. He was elected an international honorary member of the American Academy of Arts and Sciences in 1903.

== Sources ==
- This article incorporates text from a publication now in the public domain: Chisholm, Hugh, ed. (1911). "Zittel, Karl Alfred von". Encyclopædia Britannica. Vol. 28 (11th ed.). Cambridge University Press. p. 991.
- A. S. W. (1904). "Prof. Karl Alfred Von Zittel". Nature. 69 (1785): 253–255. doi:10.1038/069253b0.
- Hölder, Helmut (1976). "ZITTEL, KARL ALFRED VON". In Gillispie, Charles Coulston (ed.). Dictionary of Scientific Biography. Vol. XIV (ADDISON EMERY VERRILL - JOHANN ZWELFER). New York: Charles Scribner's Sons. pp. 626 - 627 – via Internet Archive.
- Reich, Mike; Gert Wörheide (2018). "MÜNCHEN: The Fossil Collections of the Bavarian State Collections at Munich". In Beck, Lothar A.; Urlich Joger (eds.). Paleontological Collections of Germany, Austria and Switzerland: The History of Life of Fossils Organisms at Museums and Universities. Springer International Publishing AG. pp. 431–436. doi:10.1007/978-3-319-77401-5. ISBN 978-3-319-77400-8. S2CID 53947731.
