= Porte du Ried =

Commune in Grand Est, France

- Commune
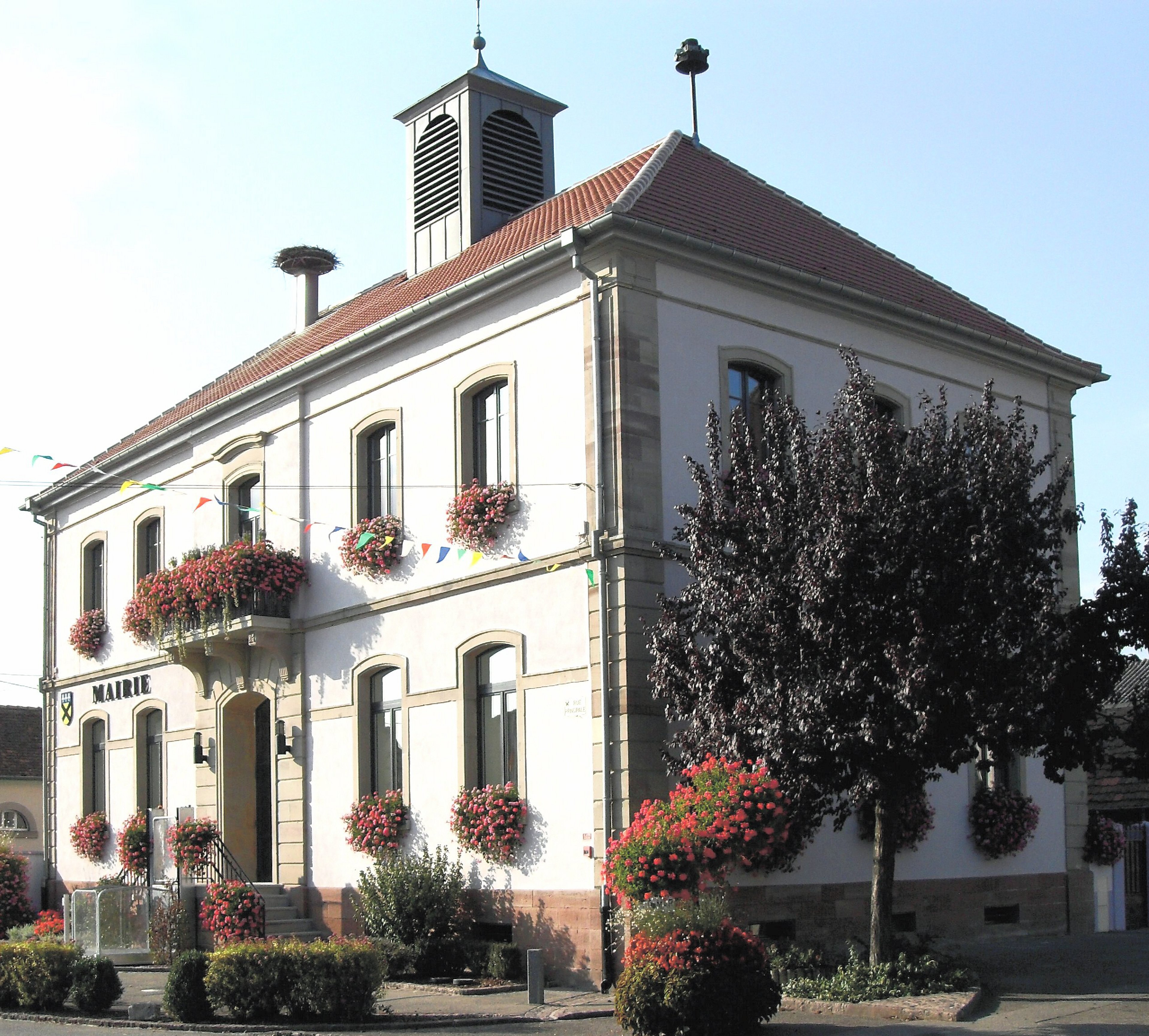
- The town hall in Holtzwihr
- Location of Porte du Ried
- Location within France Location within Grand Est
- Coordinates: 48°06′50″N 7°25′12″E
- Country: France
- Region: Grand Est
- Department: Haut-Rhin
- Arrondissement: Colmar-Ribeauvillé
- Canton: Colmar-2
- Intercommunality: Colmar Agglomération

Government
  - Mayor (2020–2026): Christian Durr
- Area^{1}: 9.49 km^{2} (3.66 sq mi)
- Population (2023): 1,971
  - Density: 208/km^{2} (538/sq mi)
- Time zone: UTC+01:00 (CET)
  - Summer (DST): UTC+02:00 (CEST)
- INSEE/Postal code: 68143 /68320
- ^{1} French Land Register data, which excludes lakes, ponds, glaciers > 1 km^{2} (0.386 sq mi or 247 acres) and river estuaries.

Porte du Ried (French pronunciation: [pɔʁt dy ʁid], literally Gate of the Ried) is a commune in the Haut-Rhin department of northeastern France. The municipality was established on 1 January 2016 and consists of the former communes of Holtzwihr and Riedwihr.

== See also ==
- Communes of the Haut-Rhin department
