= Maximilian Philipp =

German footballer (born 1994)

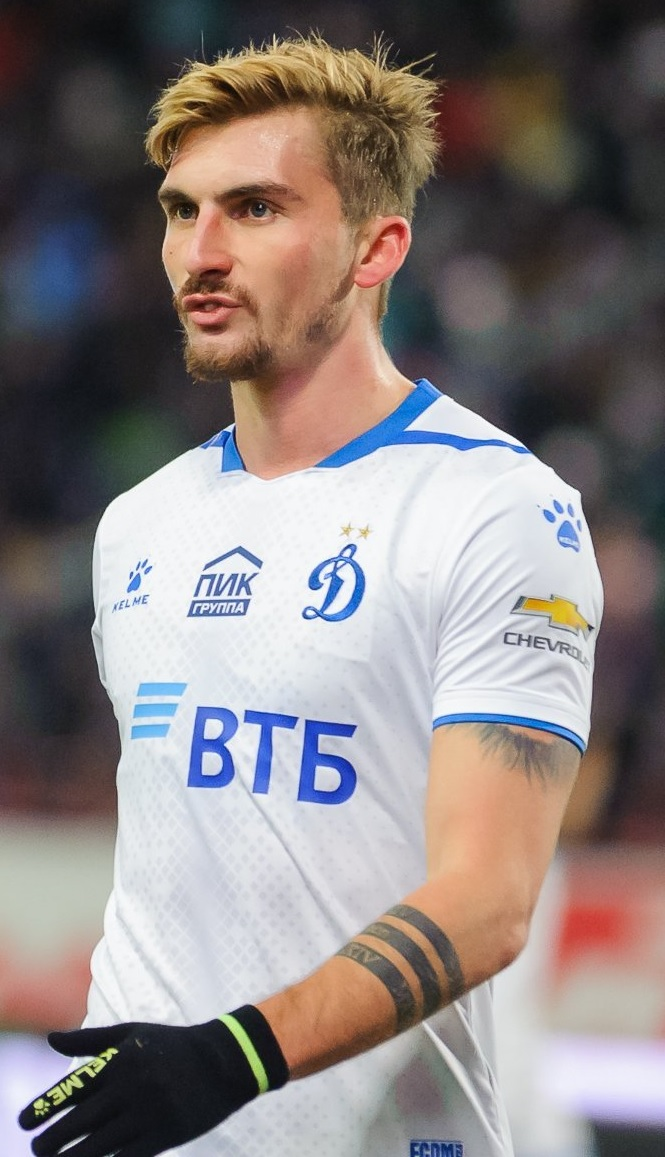
- Philipp with Dynamo Moscow in 2019.

Personal information
- Full name: Maximilian Marcus Philipp
- Date of birth: 1 March 1994 (age 32)
- Place of birth: Berlin, Germany
- Height: 1.83 m (6 ft 0 in)
- Position: Forward

Youth career
- Hertha BSC
- 2008–2011: Tennis Borussia Berlin
- 2011–2012: Energie Cottbus
- 2013: SC Freiburg

Senior career*
Years	Team	Apps	(Gls)
2011–2012	Energie Cottbus II	3	(0)
2013–2014	SC Freiburg II	31	(12)
2014–2017	SC Freiburg	81	(18)
2017–2019	Borussia Dortmund	38	(10)
2019–2021	Dynamo Moscow	27	(9)
2020–2021	→ VfL Wolfsburg (loan)	24	(6)
2021–2024	VfL Wolfsburg	25	(1)
2023	→ Werder Bremen (loan)	15	(1)
2023–2024	→ SC Freiburg (loan)	17	(1)
2024–2026	SC Freiburg	4	(0)

International career^{‡}
2014	Germany U20	2	(0)
2016–2017	Germany U21	10	(0)
Medal record
UEFA European Under-21 Championship
Winner	2017
- * Club domestic league appearances and goals as of 16 May 2026 (UTC) ‡ National team caps and goals as of 30 June 2017

Maximilian Marcus Philipp (born 1 March 1994) is a German professional footballer who plays as a forward. He represented Germany internationally at youth levels U20 and U21.

== Club career ==
Philipp started his career in his hometown club, Hertha BSC. In 2008, he joined Tennis Borussia Berlin.

=== SC Freiburg ===
In 2012, Philipp signed with SC Freiburg. On 5 April 2014, he made his first-team debut at SC Freiburg, in a Bundesliga match against VfB Stuttgart replacing Felix Klaus in the 90th minute.

=== Borussia Dortmund ===
On 7 June 2017, Philipp signed a five-year contract with Borussia Dortmund until 2022. The transfer fee paid to Freiburg was reported as €20 million plus bonuses. BVB's sporting director Michael Zorc described Philipp as "versatile" and "has a good shot and he has a fantastic future ahead of him." Philipp made his debut for BVB on 6 August 2017 in the team's 2–2 draw (6–7 on penalty) against Bayern Munich in DFL Super Cup, substituting for Christian Pulisic at 90' and netting BVB's second penalty. He started for Dortmund for the first time on 19 August 2017 in BVB's 3–0 away victory in Wolfsburg. On 18 September 2017, Philipp scored his first goal for BVB in the team's 5–0 home victory against 1. FC Köln. He went on to net his second goal in the same game. He made his UEFA Champions League debut on 26 September 2017 as Dortmund suffered home defeat against Real Madrid.

=== Dynamo Moscow ===
On 9 August 2019, Philipp signed a four-year contract with the Russian club Dynamo Moscow. He scored his first goal for Dynamo three minutes into his debut game against Lokomotiv Moscow on 18 August 2019, from a direct free-kick. In his second game against FC Tambov on 24 August, he scored again as Dynamo won 2–0 away. On 23 November 2019, he scored twice from the penalty spot to secure a 2–1 victory over FC Rostov. In the next game on 1 December 2019 he scored twice again in a 2–1 defeat of Lokomotiv Moscow. He was voted player of the month for December 2019 by Dynamo fans.

=== VfL Wolfsburg ===
On 2 October 2020, he returned to Bundesliga, joining VfL Wolfsburg on a season-long loan. In the spring of 2021, the club announced that it intends to keep Philipp in its lineup, "if the opportunity arises." However, the repayment period for a fixed amount of 11 million euros has already expired and the Germans had to negotiate with Dynamo on a new one.

On 16 June 2021, Wolfsburg agreed on a permanent transfer with Dynamo and Philipp signed a four-year contract with the club.

==== Werder Bremen ====
Philipp joined league rivals Werder Bremen on loan in January 2023. He signed as a replacement for Oliver Burke, who went on loan to Millwall. In 11 February 2023, Philipp made his debut against his former club Borussia Dortmund as a substitute for Christian Groß.

=== Return to SC Freiburg ===
On 21 August 2023, Philipp returned to SC Freiburg on loan. The loan contract contained a conditional purchase obligation option, the conditions for which were triggered in February 2024, making the transfer permanent.

== Career statistics ==
=== Club ===
As of match played 16 May 2026

Appearances and goals by club, season and competition
Club	Season	League			Cup		Continental (Note: Includes UEFA Champions League and UEFA Europa League)		Other (Note: Includes Relegation playoff and DFL-Supercup.)		Total	
Club	Season	League	Apps	Goals	Apps	Goals	Apps	Goals	Apps	Goals	Apps	Goals
Energie Cottbus	2011–12	Regionalliga Nordost	1	0	—		—		—		1	0
Energie Cottbus	2012–13	Regionalliga Nordost	2	0	—		—		—		2	0
Energie Cottbus	Total		3	0	0	0	0	0	0	0	3	0
SC Freiburg II	2012–13	Regionalliga Südwest	1	0	—		—		—		1	0
SC Freiburg II	2013–14	Regionalliga Südwest	29	12	—		—		—		29	12
SC Freiburg II	2014–15	Regionalliga Südwest	1	0	—		—		—		1	0
SC Freiburg II	Total		31	12	0	0	0	0	0	0	31	12
SC Freiburg	2013–14	Bundesliga	1	0	0	0	—		—		1	0
SC Freiburg	2014–15	Bundesliga	24	1	3	0	—		—		25	1
SC Freiburg	2015–16	2. Bundesliga	31	8	2	0	—		—		33	8
SC Freiburg	2016–17	Bundesliga	25	9	2	0	—		—		27	9
SC Freiburg	Total		81	18	7	0	—		—		88	18
Borussia Dortmund	2017–18	Bundesliga	20	9	2	0	5	0	1	0	28	9
Borussia Dortmund	2018–19	Bundesliga	18	1	3	1	2	0	—		23	2
Borussia Dortmund	Total		38	10	5	1	7	0	1	0	51	11
Dynamo Moscow	2019–20	Russian Premier League	20	8	1	0	—		—		21	8
Dynamo Moscow	2020–21	Russian Premier League	7	1	0	0	1	0	—		8	1
Dynamo Moscow	Total		27	9	1	0	1	0	0	0	29	9
VfL Wolfsburg (loan)	2020–21	Bundesliga	24	6	2	0	0	0	—		26	6
VfL Wolfsburg	2021–22	Bundesliga	22	1	1	0	2	0	—		25	1
VfL Wolfsburg	2022–23	Bundesliga	3	0	0	0	0	0	—		3	0
VfL Wolfsburg	Total		25	1	1	0	2	0	0	0	28	1
Werder Bremen (loan)	2022–23	Bundesliga	15	1	0	0	0	0	—		15	1
SC Freiburg (loan)	2023–24	Bundesliga	17	1	0	0	5 (Note: Appearances in UEFA Europa League)	1	—		22	2
SC Freiburg	2024–25	Bundesliga	2	0	1	0	—		—		3	0
SC Freiburg	2025–26	Bundesliga	2	0	0	0	—		—		2	0
SC Freiburg	Total		21	1	1	0	5	1	—		27	2
Career total			265	58	17	1	15	1	1	0	298	60

== Honours ==
SC Freiburg

- 2. Bundesliga: 2015–16
- UEFA Europa League runner-up: 2025–26

Germany U21

- UEFA European Under-21 Championship: 2017
