= Patric Klandt =

German footballer

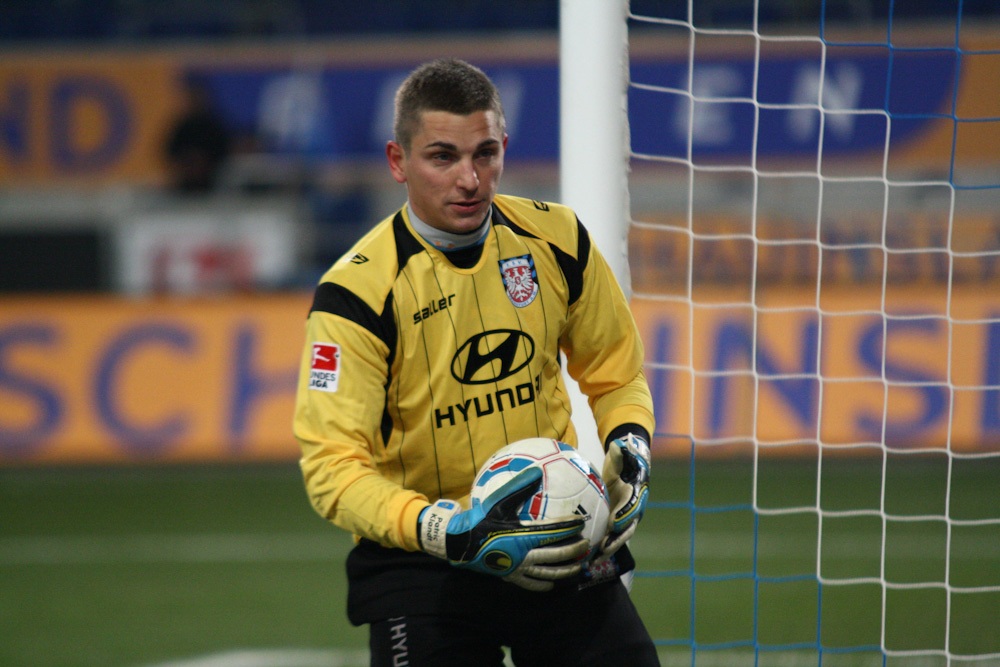
- Klandt playing for FSV Frankfurt in 2012

Personal information
- Date of birth: 29 September 1983 (age 43)
- Place of birth: Frankfurt, West Germany
- Height: 1.85 m (6 ft 1 in)
- Position: Goalkeeper

Team information
- Current team: Eintracht Frankfurt (U19 GK coach)

Youth career
- FV Sportfreunde 04 Frankfurt
- –2000: VfR Kesselstadt
- 2000–2002: Eintracht Frankfurt

Senior career*
Years	Team	Apps	(Gls)
2002–2004	Eintracht Frankfurt II	36	(0)
2004–2006	SV Wehen Wiesbaden	50	(0)
2006–2007	Hansa Rostock II	37	(0)
2006–2007	Hansa Rostock	0	(0)
2008–2015	FSV Frankfurt	244	(0)
2015–2018	SC Freiburg	1	(0)
2016–2018	SC Freiburg II	4	(0)
2018–2022	1. FC Nürnberg	0	(0)
2018–2022	1. FC Nürnberg II	10	(0)
Total		382	(0)

Managerial career
- 2022–: Eintracht Frankfurt (U19 GK coach)
- * Club domestic league appearances and goals

Patric Klandt (born 29 September 1983) is a German professional football coach and a former goalkeeper. He works as the goalkeeping coach with the Under-19 squad of Eintracht Frankfurt.

== Coaching career ==
Klandt retired from playing in the summer of 2022 and was hired by Eintracht Frankfurt as goalkeepers' coach for their Under-19 squad.

== Career statistics ==
As of match played 23 April 2022

Appearances and goals by club, season and competition
Club	Season	League			National cup		Europe		Other		Total	
Club	Season	Division	Apps	Goals	Apps	Goals	Apps	Goals	Apps	Goals	Apps	Goals
Hansa Rostock II	2002–03	Regionalliga Süd	2	0	—		—		—		2	0
Hansa Rostock II	2003–04	Oberliga Hessen	34	0	—		—		—		34	0
Hansa Rostock II	Total		36	0	—		—		—		36	0
SV Wehen Wiesbaden	2004–05	Regionalliga Süd	28	0	—		—		—		28	0
SV Wehen Wiesbaden	2005–06	Regionalliga Süd	22	0	—		—		—		22	0
SV Wehen Wiesbaden	Total		50	0	—		—		—		50	0
Hansa Rostock II	2006–07	NOFV-Oberliga	24	0	1	0	—		—		25	0
Hansa Rostock II	2007–08	NOFV-Oberliga	13	0	—		—		—		13	0
Hansa Rostock II	Total		37	0	—		—		—		38	0
Hansa Rostock	2006–07	2. Bundesliga	0	0	—		—		—		0	0
Hansa Rostock	2007–08	2. Bundesliga	0	0	0	0	—		—		0	0
Hansa Rostock	Total		0	0	0	0	—		—		0	0
FSV Frankfurt	2007–08	Regionalliga Süd	15	0	—		—		—		15	0
FSV Frankfurt	2008–09	2. Bundesliga	33	0	2	0	—		—		35	0
FSV Frankfurt	2009–10	2. Bundesliga	33	0	1	0	—		—		34	0
FSV Frankfurt	2010–11	2. Bundesliga	29	0	2	0	—		—		31	0
FSV Frankfurt	2011–12	2. Bundesliga	34	0	0	0	—		—		34	0
FSV Frankfurt	2012–13	2. Bundesliga	33	0	2	0	—		—		35	0
FSV Frankfurt	2013–14	2. Bundesliga	33	0	2	0	—		—		35	0
FSV Frankfurt	2014–15	2. Bundesliga	34	0	2	0	—		—		36	0
FSV Frankfurt	Total		244	0	11	0	—		—		255	0
SC Freiburg	2015–16	2. Bundesliga	1	0	2	0	—		—		3	0
SC Freiburg	2016–17	Bundesliga	0	0	0	0	—		—		0	0
SC Freiburg	2017–18	Bundesliga	0	0	0	0	0	0	—		0	0
SC Freiburg	Total		1	0	2	0	0	0	—		3	0
SC Freiburg II	2015–16	Regionalliga Südwest	1	0	—		—		—		1	0
SC Freiburg II	2016–17	Regionalliga Südwest	3	0	—		—		—		3	0
SC Freiburg II	Total		4	0	—		—		—		4	0
1. FC Nürnberg	2017–18	Bundesliga	0	0	0	0	—		—		0	0
1. FC Nürnberg	2018–19	2. Bundesliga	0	0	0	0	—		—		0	0
1. FC Nürnberg	2019–20	2. Bundesliga	0	0	1	0	—		0	0	1	0
1. FC Nürnberg	2020–21	2. Bundesliga	0	0	0	0	—		—		0	0
1. FC Nürnberg	Total		0	0	1	0	—		—		1	0
1. FC Nürnberg II	2018–19	Regionalliga Bayern	4	0	—		—		—		4	0
1. FC Nürnberg II	2019–20	Regionalliga Bayern	1	0	—		—		—		1	0
1. FC Nürnberg II	2021–22	Regionalliga Bayern	5	0	—		—		—		5	0
1. FC Nürnberg II	Total		10	0	—		—		—		10	0
Career total			382	0	15	0	0	0	0	0	397	0
