= Sarmaturbo colini =

Scientific classification
- Kingdom: Animalia
- Phylum: Mollusca
- Class: Gastropoda
- Subclass: Vetigastropoda
- Order: Trochida
- Superfamily: Trochoidea
- Family: Turbinidae
- Genus: †Sarmaturbo
- Species: †S. colini

Binomial name
- †Sarmaturbo colini (L. C. King, 1931)

Synonyms
- Bolma colini L. C. King, 1931

Extinct species of gastropod

Sarmaturbo colini is an extinct species of sea snail, a marine gastropod mollusk, in the family Turbinidae, the turban snails.

== Distribution ==
This species occurs in New Zealand.
