= Holtzwihr =

Part of Porte du Ried in Grand Est, France

- Part of Porte du Ried
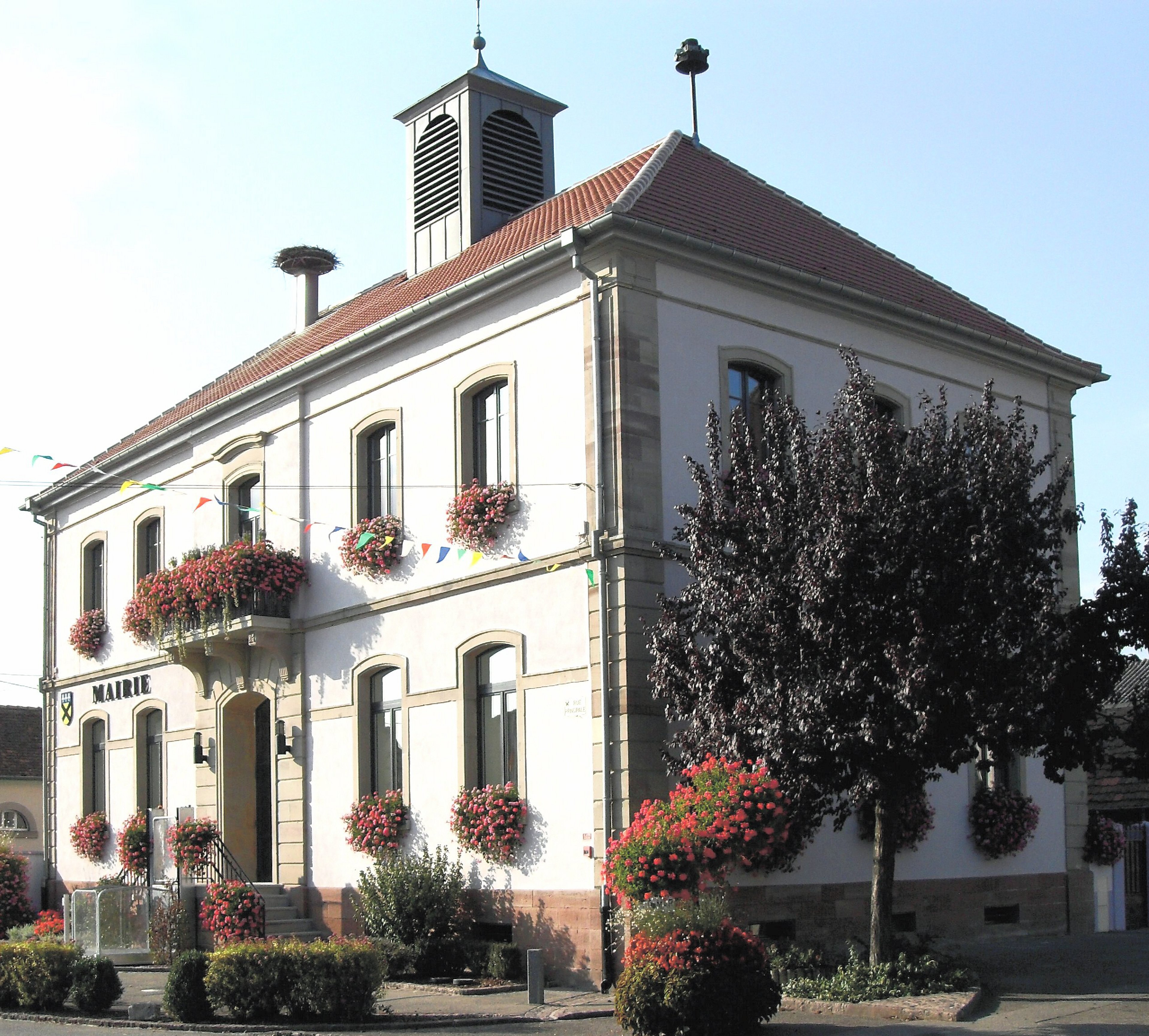
- Town hall

- Coat of arms
- Location of Holtzwihr
- Location within France Location within Grand Est
- Coordinates: 48°06′47″N 7°25′17″E
- Country: France
- Region: Grand Est
- Department: Haut-Rhin
- Arrondissement: Colmar-Ribeauvillé
- Canton: Colmar-2
- Commune: Porte du Ried
- Area^{1}: 6.45 km^{2} (2.49 sq mi)
- Elevation: 182 m (597 ft)
- Highest elevation: 186 m (610 ft)
- Lowest elevation: 180 m (590 ft)
- Population (2022): 1,508
  - Density: 234/km^{2} (606/sq mi)
- Time zone: UTC+01:00 (CET)
  - Summer (DST): UTC+02:00 (CEST)
- Postal code: 68320
- ^{1} French Land Register data, which excludes lakes, ponds, glaciers > 1 km^{2} (0.386 sq mi or 247 acres) and river estuaries.

Holtzwihr (French pronunciation: [ɔltsviʁ]; German: Holzweier; Alsatian: Holzwihr) is a former commune in the Haut-Rhin department in north-eastern France. On 1 January 2016, it was merged into the new commune Porte du Ried. It was also the location of the World War II Battle of Holtzwihr on January 26, 1945, during which US Army Second Lieutenant Audie Murphy of the 3rd Infantry Division, almost single-handedly cut down an advancing German unit, earning the Medal of Honor.

It also has a road named after Audie Murphy, Rue Audie Murphy (see Google Maps).

== See also ==
- Communes of the Haut-Rhin département
