= Riedwihr =

Part of Porte du Ried in Grand Est, France

- Part of Porte du Ried
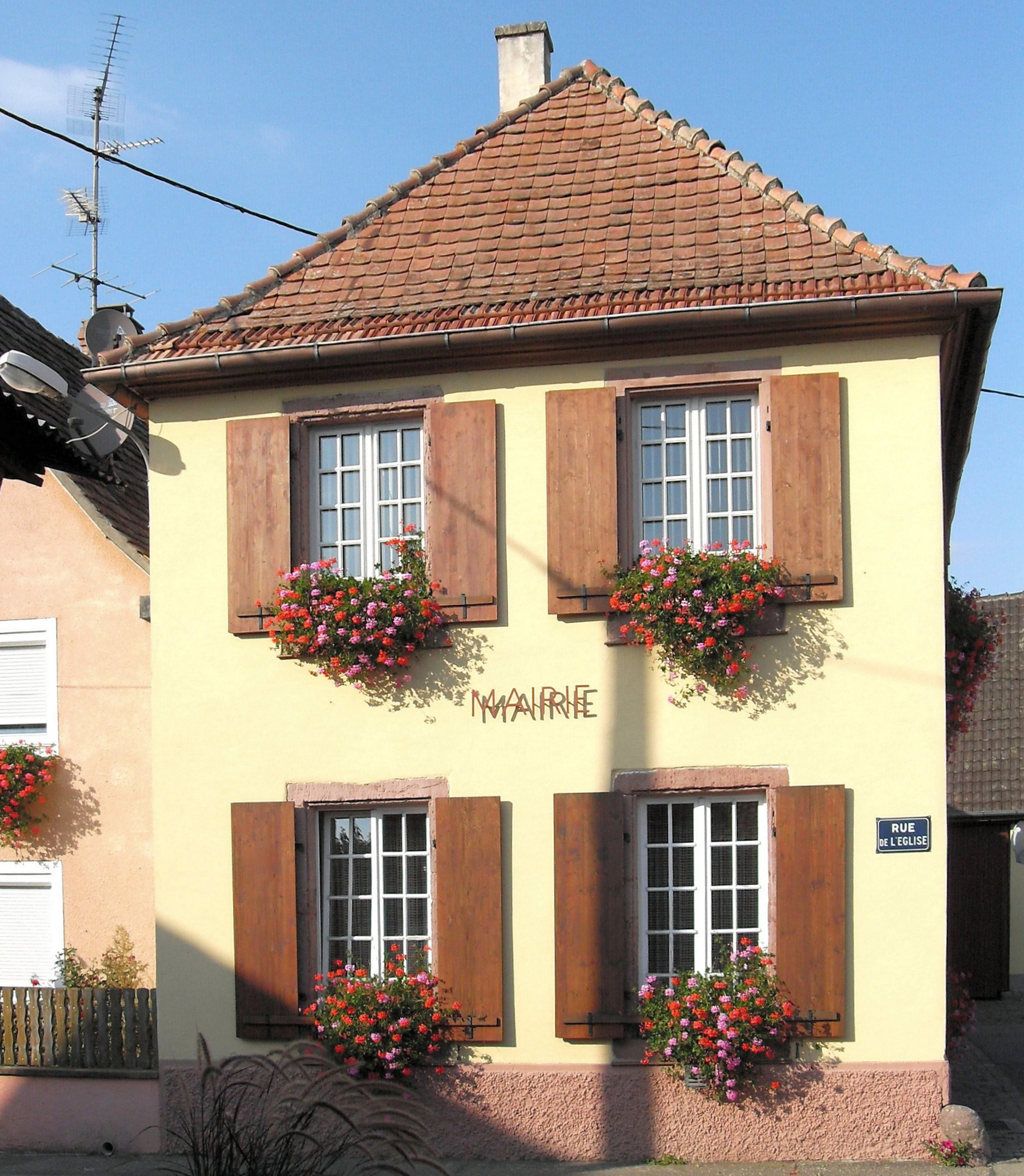
- Town hall

- Coat of arms
- Location of Riedwihr
- Location within France Location within Grand Est
- Coordinates: 48°07′39″N 7°26′45″E
- Country: France
- Region: Grand Est
- Department: Haut-Rhin
- Arrondissement: Colmar-Ribeauvillé
- Canton: Colmar-2
- Commune: Porte du Ried
- Area^{1}: 3.04 km^{2} (1.17 sq mi)
- Elevation: 181 m (594 ft)
- Highest elevation: 184 m (604 ft)
- Lowest elevation: 177 m (581 ft)
- Population (2022): 406
  - Density: 134/km^{2} (346/sq mi)
- Time zone: UTC+01:00 (CET)
  - Summer (DST): UTC+02:00 (CEST)
- Postal code: 68320
- ^{1} French Land Register data, which excludes lakes, ponds, glaciers > 1 km^{2} (0.386 sq mi or 247 acres) and river estuaries.

Riedwihr (French pronunciation: [ʁidviʁ]; German: Riedweier) is a former commune in the Haut-Rhin department in Grand Est in north-eastern France. On 1 January 2016, it was merged into the new commune Porte du Ried.

== See also ==
- Communes of the Haut-Rhin department
