= Bahlingen =

- Municipality
- Coat of arms

- Location of Bahlingen within Emmendingen district
- Interactive map of Bahlingen
- Location within Germany Location within Baden-Württemberg
- Coordinates: 48°7′19″N 7°44′12″E
- Country: Germany
- State: Baden-Württemberg
- Admin. region: Freiburg
- District: Emmendingen

Government
  - Mayor (2018–26): Harald Lotis

Area
  - Total: 12.66 km^{2} (4.89 sq mi)
- Elevation: 217 m (712 ft)

Population (2025-12-31)
  - Total: 4,556
  - Density: 359.9/km^{2} (932.1/sq mi)
- Time zone: UTC+01:00 (CET)
  - Summer (DST): UTC+02:00 (CEST)
- Postal codes: 79353
- Dialling codes: 07663
- Vehicle registration: EM
- Website: www.bahlingen.de

Bahlingen am Kaiserstuhl (German pronunciation: [ˈbaːlɪŋən ʔam ˈkaɪzɐʃtuːl], lit. 'Bahlingen on the Kaiserstuhl') is a municipality in the district of Emmendingen, Baden-Württemberg, southwestern Germany.

== Geography ==
Bahlingen am Kaiserstuhl is situated on the edge of the volcanic region Kaiserstuhl, on the banks of the river "Alte Dreisam", about 20 km north-west of Freiburg im Breisgau,

The Kaiserstuhl, where Bahlingen is situated, is one of the warmest regions in Germany. This Mediterranean climate produces quality wines.

== History ==
The name of the village presumably originates from 'Baldinga', which means roughly "among Baldo's people". It was first mentioned in a document in 762. However, it is likely that Alemannic tribes had settled on the territory as early as the 3rd - 5th century. From 1415 on, Bahlingen belonged to the Markgrafschaft Baden (Margraviate Baden) and therefore it became Protestant during the Reformation. During the Thirty Year's War and again in the wars waged by the French King Louis XIV, the place was almost completely destroyed. During both World Wars, however, Bahlingen came through widely undamaged.

== Coat of arms ==
The design of the shield is split in two parts: On the left side, the image shows a read bend on a golden background. On the right side, there is a vine knife with a black handle over a tilted silver ploughshare.

== Twinning Arrangement ==
Since 1996, Bahlingen has been twinned with several French villages in the Alsace region:

Bischwihr, Holtzwihr, Riedwihr and Wickerschwihr.

== Economy and Infrastructure ==
For a long time in history, Bahlingen was characterized by agriculture and wine growing. In the last hundred years, however, the village has been modernized. In 1896, the place was connected to the railway net Kaiserstuhlbahn (Kaiserstuhl Railway). In the following years, the infrastructure was constantly enlarged. Since the 1970s, trade and industry increasingly settled in Bahlingen. Currently, there are about 1000 jobs available.

=== Viticulture ===
Wine-growing in this region reaches back to the Roman Age. Currently, Bahlingen cultivates about 280 hectares of vines. Wineries and the cooperative 'Winzer vom Silberberg' (The Vintners of the Silver Mountain) cultivate and sell the wine. The vintners farm a grape variety of Müller-Thurgau (a white grape variety), Pinot Noir, Pinot Blanc and Pinot Gris.

== Architecture ==
The mountain church with stained glass windows by Valentin Peter Feuerstein towers over the village. Some historical Fachwerkhäuser (half-timbered houses) are characteristic for the overall appearance of the locality. The town hall with its rich half-timbered structure dates back to the 17th century.

== Sports ==
Bahlingen's soccer team Bahlinger SC plays in the Regionalliga Südwest (regional league south-west), which ranks fourth in Germany's soccer leagues.

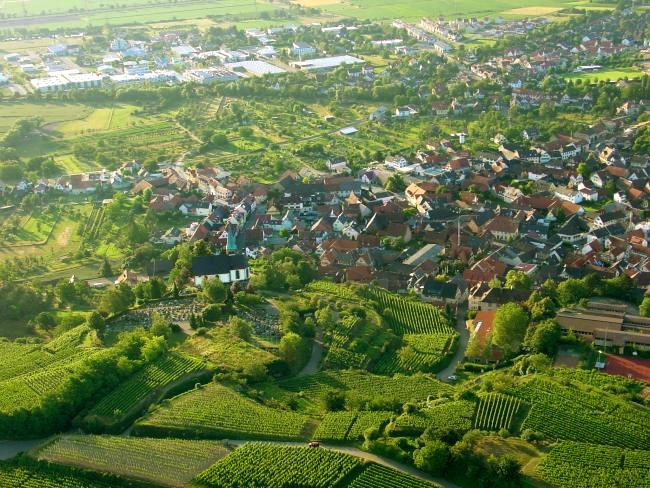
Bahlingen
