= Amir Falahen =

German footballer

Personal information
- Date of birth: 15 March 1993 (age 33)
- Place of birth: Freiburg im Breisgau, Germany
- Height: 1.93 m (6 ft 4 in)
- Position: Forward

Youth career
- –2008: SV Hochdorf
- 2008–2009: PTSV Jahn Freiburg
- 2009–2012: SC Freiburg

Senior career*
Years	Team	Apps	(Gls)
2012–2017	SC Freiburg II	82	(32)
2015–2016	SC Freiburg	3	(0)
2017–2018	Fortuna Köln	15	(1)
2018–2019	Fortuna Düsseldorf II	15	(3)
2019–2022	Bahlinger SC	71	(14)
- * Club domestic league appearances and goals as of 14 May 2022

Amir Falahen (born 15 March 1993) is a German professional footballer who plays as a forward.

== Career ==
Falahen came to Freiburg in 2009 after playing for SV Hochdorf and PTSV Jahn Freiburg in his youth. With the Freiburg junior team he the DFB-Junioren-Vereinspokal in 2011 and 2012. In the 2012–13 season he moved up into Freiburg's second team and scored 18 goals in the 2013–14 season, when the team finished as runners-up. In July 2014, Falahen picked up a cruciate ligament injury during a friendly match with the first team and was sidelined for more than half a year. After his return in March 2015, he scored five goals in 11 matches. In the 2015–16 season Falahen received a professional contract with SC Freiburg, and on 5 February 2016, during a 0–2 defeat to VfL Bochum, Falahen made his debut in the 2. Bundesliga as a substitute. This made Falahen the first Palestinian who ever played in the 2. Bundesliga.

== Personal life ==
Born in Germany, Falahen is of Palestinian descent.
