= Florian Niederlechner =

German footballer

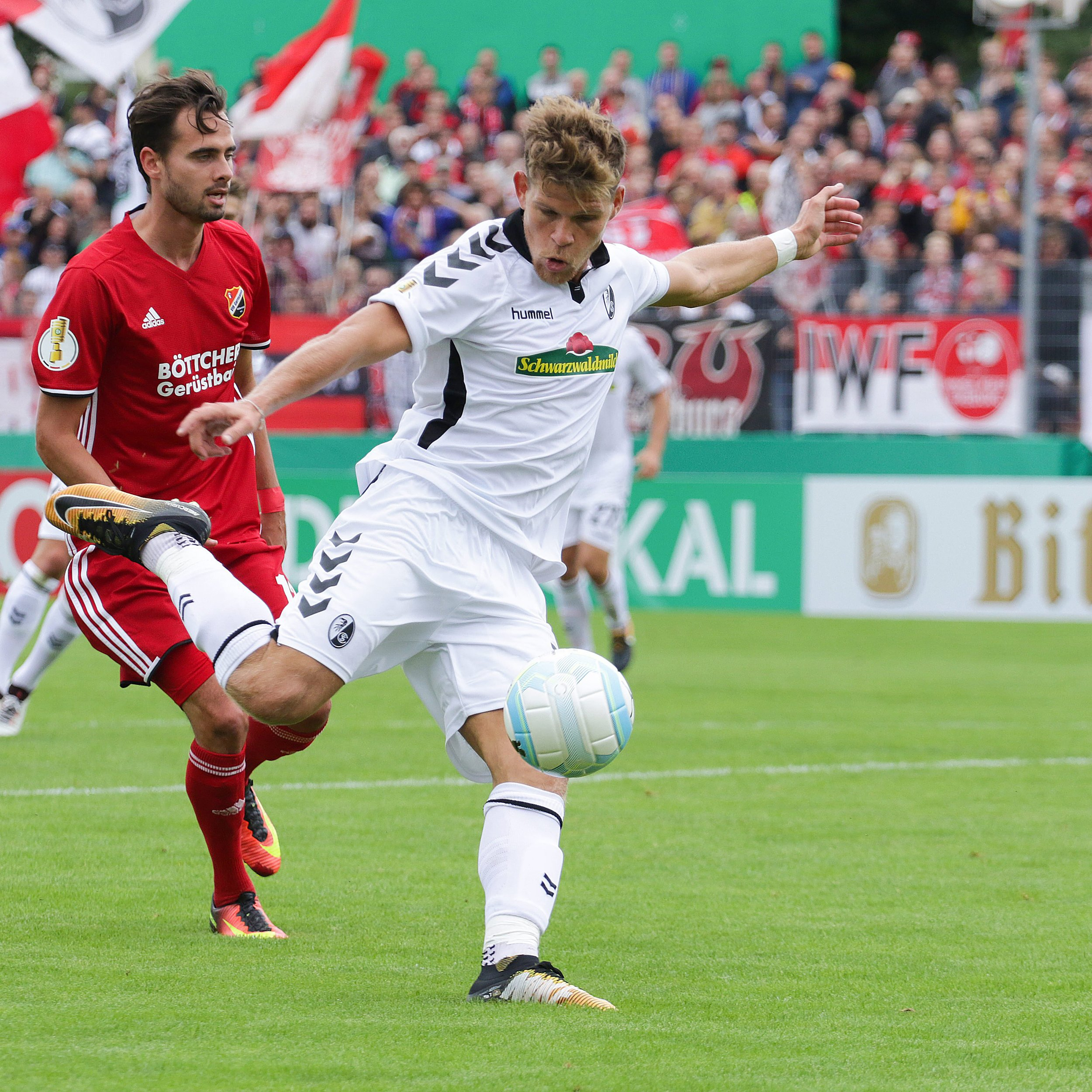
- Niederlechner with SC Freiburg in 2017

Personal information
- Date of birth: 24 October 1990 (age 36)
- Place of birth: Ebersberg, Germany
- Height: 1.87 m (6 ft 2 in)
- Position: Forward

Team information
- Current team: TSV 1860 Munich
- Number: 7

Youth career
- SV Hohenlinden
- 1860 Munich
- –2008: TSV Ebersberg

Senior career*
Years	Team	Apps	(Gls)
2008–2010	FC Falke Markt Schwaben		
2010–2011	FC Ismaning	34	(19)
2011–2013	SpVgg Unterhaching	56	(16)
2013–2015	1. FC Heidenheim	79	(27)
2015–2017	Mainz 05	12	(0)
2016–2017	→ SC Freiburg (loan)	48	(19)
2017–2019	SC Freiburg	34	(6)
2019–2023	FC Augsburg	101	(27)
2023–2025	Hertha BSC	70	(14)
2025–	TSV 1860 Munich	37	(6)
- * Club domestic league appearances and goals as of 27 September 2026

Florian Niederlechner (born 24 October 1990) is a German professional footballer who plays as a forward for club TSV 1860 Munich.

== Career ==
Niederlechner's career is considered atypical since he became a Bundesliga player without passing through the youth ranks of a professional club. At the age of twelve, after a single year with the club, he was forced to leave the under-13 team of 1860 Munich being deemed too small and too slow. He moved to the local Kreisliga club TSV Ebersberg, starting playing senior football for Landesliga side FC Falke Markt Schwaben in 2008. At the time he completed his vocational training as industrial management assistant.

In 2010, he joined fifth tier Bayernliga side FC Ismaning. There he created a stir by scoring 19 goals in the 2010–11 season, eventually receiving and accepting an offer from 3. Liga's SpVgg Unterhaching, which was forced to bet on young talents due to its financial difficulties. For Unterhaching, Niederlechner continued to be a successful striker, scoring eight goals in the 2011–12 season and another eight in the first leg of the next campaign. During the winter break 2012–13, he made the next move, this time to ambitious fellow 3. Liga side 1. FC Heidenheim, with whom he achieved promotion to the 2. Bundesliga in 2014. After 15 goals and ten assists in 33 league matches, and Heidenheim finishing 8th after promotion to 2. Bundesliga, he finally made the step to the Bundesliga, joining Mainz 05. This move was reportedly worth a transfer fee of €2 million.

He was loaned to SC Freiburg on 31 January 2016.

On 29 May 2019, FC Augsburg announced that Niederlechner would join the club from the upcoming season. He penned a three-year contract.

On 18 January 2023, Niederlechner joined Hertha BSC on a contract valid until 2025. On 28 January 2023, Niederlechner made his Hertha debut as a substitute for Wilfried Kanga, against Union Berlin.

In the summer of 2025, Niederlechner returned to his youth club TSV 1860 Munich.

== Personal life ==
He shares a flat with one of his best friends, Michael Vitzthum, who had been his team mate at Heidenheim, and now plays for SV Wehen Wiesbaden.
